= A. V. Anoop =

Indian entrepreneur, social worker and film producer

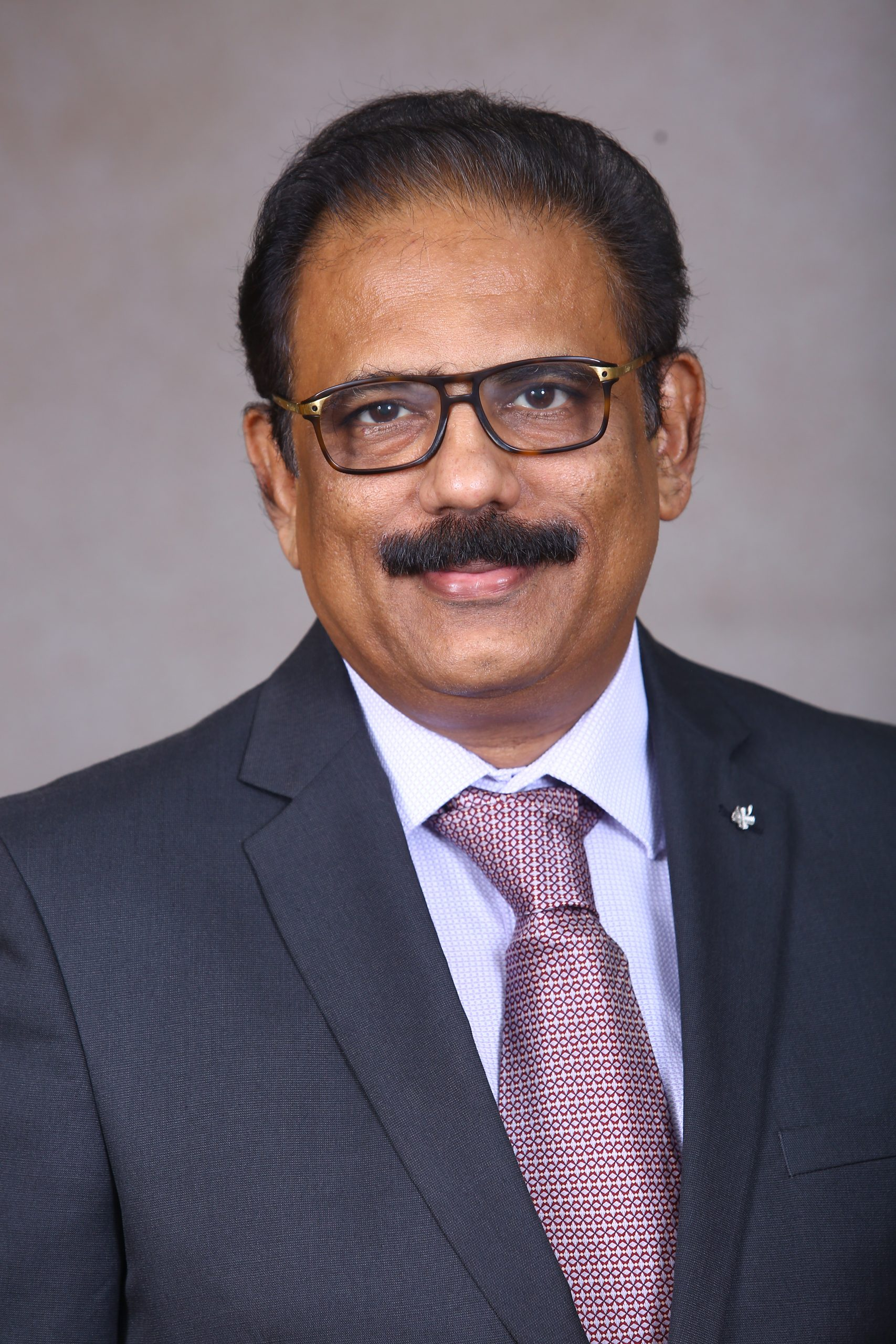
- Born: 30 April 1962 (age 64); Thrissur, Kerala, India
- Known for: AVA Group; AVA Productions
- Spouse: Priya Anoop
- Children: 2
- Website: avanoop.com

Arayamparambil Vasavan Anoop, better known as A V Anoop (born 30 April 1962), is an Indian entrepreneur, social worker, actor, author and film producer. He is the Managing Director of AVA Group of Companies, a consortium of ayurvedic, herbal and food products. AVA group is known for the iconic brand, "MEDIMIX", world largest selling ayurvedic soap in South India. The group also owns the most popular household Kerala brands in spices and condiments "Melam", Kaytra in personal care and a multi-speciality most modern ayurvedic hospital under the name "Sanjeevanam" in Kochi, Kerala.

In December 2023, he was appointed as the Chairman of India Eurasia Trade Council by the Ambassador of Kyrgyzstan to India.

In 2007, he started producing movies under the banner of AVA Productions that includes feature films, documentaries & short films. The banner has bagged various awards regionally, nationally, and internationally.

In 2007, he won the Kerala State Film Award under the category of ‘Best Documentary Film’ for producing the documentary titled ‘Before the Brush Dropped’. In 2008, he won the 56th National Film Award for the Best Film on Family Values- Non-feature section for the short film ‘Appuvin Nayagan-Spotty (My Hero).

’The movies Paleri Manikyam: Oru Pathirakolapathakathinte Katha, won the 2009 Kerala State Film Award for Best Film and Vishwaguru, a film that was made and released in 51 hours and 2 minutes following a "script to screen" rule, created a new Guinness World Record in the year 2017.

The banner has also produced the first-ever Science Sanskrit documentary titled "YAANAM" which was officially selected for screening at the Indian Panorama 2022.

Currently, the banner has produced over 35 projects, with the latest being Sookshmadarshini. Mr. Anoop won Kerala Film critics award 2023,

In the year 2023, he penned a book named "You Turn", a memoir which was published by DC Books. The book was officially released at the Sharjah International Book Festival on 5 November 2023.The Tamil version of the memoir published by Sixthsense Publications was released at the Sharjah International Book Festival on 7 November 2024. The English version of the memoir was published by Penguin Random House India Ltd on 2025.

== Film Production ==
Year	Film	Language	Role	Notes	Ref
2007	Pranayakalam	Malayalam	Producer	Feature Film	
2007	Before the Brush Dropped	English	Producer	Documentary film based on Raja Ravi Varma; Won Kerala State Film Award for Best Documentary	
2008	De Ingottu Nokkiye	Malayalam	Producer	Feature Film	
2008	Appuvin Nayagan- Spotty (My Hero)	Tamil	Producer	Short film Won 56th National Film Awards for 'Best Film on Family Values'; Non-feature section for the year 2008	
2009	Paleri Manikyam Oru Pathira Kolapathakathinte Katha	Malayalam	Co-producer	Won 2009 Kerala State Film Awards Best film	
2010	Yugapurushan	Malayalam	Producer	Feature Film	
2011	Chaaya (The Image)	Malayalam	Producer	Short film	
2010	Kadaksham	Malayalam	Producer	Feature Film	
2011	Christian Brothers	Malayalam	Co-producer	Feature Film	
2012	Aarohanam	Tamil	Producer	Feature Film	
2013	Aaru Sundarimaarude Katha	Malayalam	Producer	Feature Film	
2013	Agnaye (For the Fire)	Malayalam	Producer	Documentary	
2014	Mr. Fraud	Malayalam	Producer	Feature Film	
2014	Enna Satham Indha Neram	Tamil	Producer	Feature Film, Limca Book of Records for being the "first ever film in the world arena, to cast real life quadruplets – four children born of the same pregnancy – in the same plot"	
2014	Nerungi Vaa Muthamidathe	Tamil	Producer	Feature Film	
2016	School Bus	Malayalam	Producer	Feature Film	
2016	Guppy	Malayalam	Co-producer	Feature Film, Won Kerala State Film Award for Best Child Artist - Chethan Jayalal; Won Kerala State Film Award for Best Background Music - Vishnu Vijay; Won Kerala State Film Award for Best Singer - Sooraj Santhosh; Won Kerala State Film Award for Best Costume Designer - Stephy Zaviour; Won Kerala State Film Award – Special Mention - Girish Gangadharan	
2017	Ezra	Malayalam	Co-producer	Feature Film	
2017	Godha	Malayalam	Co-producer	Feature Film	
2017	Vishwaguru	Malayalam	Co-producer	Feature Film, Won Guinness record for fastest film produced (script to screen)	
2018	Oolu	Malayalam	Producer	Feature Film, Won National Film Award for Best Cinematography - M. J. Radhakrishnan	
2019	Ishq	Malayalam	Co-producer	Feature Film	
2019	Vishrutham	Malayalam	Producer	Short Film	
2019	Appuvinte sathyanveshanam	Malayalam	Co-producer, Actor	Feature Film	
2019	Ambili	Malayalam	Co-producer	Feature Film	
2020	Anveshanam	Malayalam	Co-producer	Feature Film	
2020	Randaam Naal	Malayalam	Producer, Actor	Feature Film	
2022	Political Correctness	Malayalam	Producer, Actor	Short Film	
2022	Pada	Malayalam	Co-producer	Feature Film	
2022	Yaanam	Sanskrit	Producer	Documentary, Portrays India's dream project Mars Orbiter Mission (Mangalyaan). It is the 1st science documentary in Sanskrit language in the history of world cinema	
2022	The Green Man	English	Producer	Documentary	
2023	Achan Oru Vaazha Vachu	Malayalam	Producer	Feature Film	
2024	Sookshmadarshini	Malayalam	Co-producer	Feature Film	
2025	Ayurveda – The double helix of life	English	Producer	Documentary	
2025	Vilayath Buddha	Malayalam	Co-producer	Feature Film	
2025	Alien Brihaspati	Malayalam	Producer,Actor	Short Film	
2026	A Duck Tale	Malayalam	Producer	Feature Film	
2026	Ananthathayilekk	Malayalam	Producer,Actor	Short Film	
2026	Showcause	Malayalam	Producer,Actor	Short Film	
2026	Namit Malhotra's Ramayana-Rise of a legend	Keralam	Distributor	Feature Film	

== Filmography ==
Year	Title	Language	Character
2010	Kadaksham	Malayalam	Dr.Harisankar
2014	Enna Satham Indha Neram	Tamil	Minister
2014	Mr.Fraud	Malayalam	ADGP Joseph
2014	Nerugi Vaa Muthamidathe	Tamil	ADGP Askok Pillai
2016	School bus	Malayalam	Father. Vakkachan uncle of Jayasurya
2017	The Kamasutra Garden	English	Father
2019	Appuvinte sathyanveshanam	Malayalam	Gandhi Jotsyan
2019	Devakottai Kadhal	Tamil	Pannaiyaar
2020	Shyamaragam(TBR)	Malayalam	Father
2020	Randaam Naal	Malayalam	Janardhanan
2022	Swapnangal Pookkunna Kaadu	Malayalam	Dr.Pavithran
2023	Achanoru Vazha Vechu	Malayalam	Sachi
2024	Vettaiyan	Tamil	Judge
2024	Daya Bharathi	Malayalam	Circle Inspector-Kerala Police
2024	Recap(TBR)	Malayalam	Retd. judge
2024	Sookshmadarshini	Malayalam	Managing Direrctor
2025	Sirai (2025 film)Sirai	Tamil	Court Judge
2025	Alien Brihaspati(Short Film)	Malayalam	Joseph
2026	Ananthathayilekk(Short Film)	Malayalam	Adv.J K Damodaran
2026	Show Cause(Short Film)	Malayalam	S I Peeter John

== Personal life ==
A. V. Anoop is the son of A. G. Vasavan and Lilly Bai. He had his schooling with St. Joseph's Higher Secondary School, Thiruvananthapuram and graduated in commerce from Mahatma Gandhi College, Thiruvananthapuram. He stays at Chennai with his family.
