= Vishvaguru (disambiguation) =

Vishvaguru or Vishwaguru is a Sanskrit phrase and idea which translates to world or global teacher, world guru, tutors of the world, world leader, or teacher to the world or universe.

Vishwaguru may also refer to:

- Vishwaguru (2017 film)
- Vishwaguru (2025 film)
