= Page 3 (disambiguation) =

Page 3 was a British newspaper convention of printing a large photograph of a topless woman on the third page of several tabloid newspapers.

Page 3 may also refer to:

- Page 3 culture, a culture related to page 3 of Indian tabloids, which feature gossip about high society
- Page 3 (film), a Bollywood film by Madhur Bhandarkar
- Page Three (band), a 1970s British girl group

== See also ==
- Sunshine Girl
