= Vishwaguru (2017 film) =

- Directed by: Vijeesh Mani
- Written by: Pramod Payyannur
- Produced by: A. V. Anoop; Vijeesh Mani
- Starring: Purushothaman Kainakkari; Gandhiyan Chacha Sivarajan; Swamy Sachithananda; Kaladharan; Kalanilayam Ramachandran; Harikrishnan; K. P. A. C. Leelakrishnan; Roji P, Kurian
- Cinematography: Loganathan Srinivasan
- Edited by: Vijeesh Mani
- Music by: Kilimanoor Ramavarma (BGM)
- Production companies: Anashwara Charitable Trust; AVA Productions
- Release date: 29 December 2017 (India)
- Country: India
- Language: Malayalam

Vishwaguru (lit. 'Universal guru') is a 2017 Malayalam-language Indian biographical film directed by Vijeesh Mani and co-produced with A. V. Anoop. It is based on the life of Narayana Guru, the film features Purushothaman Kainakkari, Gandhiyan Chacha Sivarajan, Kaladharan and Kalanilayam Ramachandran in lead roles.

The film was made and released in 51 hours and 2 minutes following a "script to screen" rule.

== Summary ==
Vishwaguru is based on the life of Narayana Guru, a social reformer of India who led a reform movement in Kerala, rejected casteism, and promoted new values of spiritual freedom and social equality.

== Cast ==
- Purushothaman Kainakkari - Sree Narayana Guru
- Gandhiyan Chacha Sivarajan - Mahatma Gandhi
- K.Kaladharan - Rabindranath Tagore
- Kalanilayam Ramachandran - Kumaran Asan
- Swamy Sachithananda - Swamy Sachithananda
- Harikrishnan - Dr.Palpu
- K.P.A.C. Leelakrishnan - Grand father
- Baby Pavithra - Grand daughter Pavithra
- Roji P. Kurian - Foreign Devotee

== Script to screen time ==
The film was scripted, created, and released in 51 hours and two minutes, which was recorded in Guinness World Records as the fastest film produced.
