= Middle-market newspaper =

Newspaper with both entertainment and important news events

A middle-market newspaper caters to a readership base inclined to be informed on entertainment trends as well as coverage of major news events. Such newspapers are the middle segment of a continuum of journalistic seriousness: upper-market or "quality" newspapers generally cover hard news, and down-market newspapers favour sensationalist stories.

The United Kingdom's two national middle-market papers are the Daily Mail and the Daily Express, distinguishable by their black-top masthead (both use the tabloid paper size), as opposed to the red-top mastheads of down-market tabloids. There was also formerly Today, published from 1986 to 1995.

USA Today and the Times of India are other typical middle-market broadsheet newspapers, headquartered in the United States and India, respectively. A daily supplement devoted to coverage of Page 3 events is a salient feature of such newspapers in India.
