= Vijeesh Mani =

Indian film producer

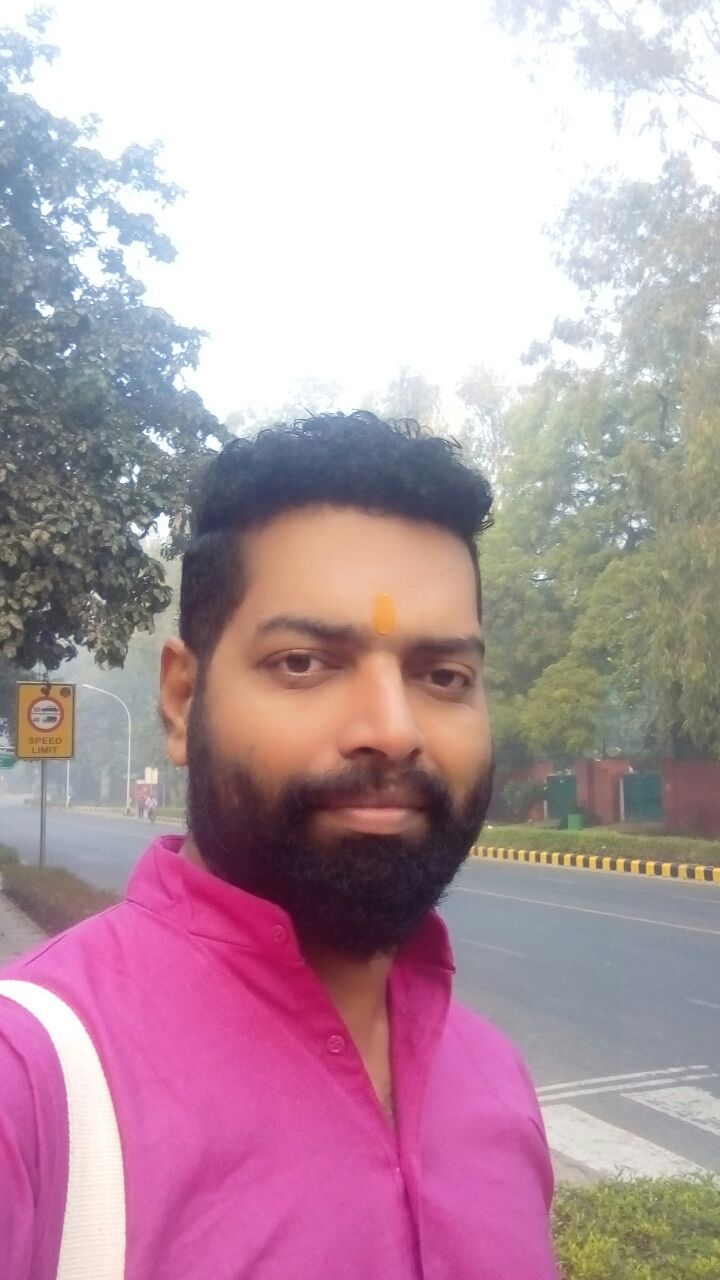
- Born: 24 April 1977 (age 49); Guruvayur, Kerala, India
- Occupations: Producer; Director
- Years active: 1995 – present
- Known for: Bhagavan; Vishwaguru
- Spouse: separated
- Children: Virat Vijeesh

Vijeesh Mani is a producer and director of Malayalam language films. He is best known as the director of Vishwaguru, a film that was made and released in 51 hours and 2 minutes following a "script to screen" rule, which was recorded in Guinness World Records.

The environmental film Puzhayamma starring Baby Meenakshi and Linda Arsenio in lead roles and the Irula language film Netaji with Gokulam Gopalan as lead actor that won Guinness award for the first tribal language film are getting ready for theatrical release.

Mani's Sanskrit film Namo starring Jayaram has been completed. His Mmmmm starring I.M.Vijayan, produced by Sohan Roy won several accolades. Sohan Roy teamed with Mani again for Aadhivaasi, the film based on the death of a youth named Madhu at Attappadi.

== Filmography ==
Year	Film	Language	Role	Notes
2024	Velichappad	Malayalam	Director, Story	Docu fiction
2022	Aadhivaasi	Muduga	Director, Story	
2021	Mmmmm	Kurumba	Director, Story	Shortlisted for 2021 Oscars; Won the Best film award at 2021 Paris Film Festival.
2020	Namo	Sanskrit	Director, Story, Producer	Selected in the Indian Panorama section of IFFI Goa, 2020
2019	Netaji	Irula	Director, Story	Guinness record for Tribal language film Selected in the Indian Panorama section of IFFI Goa, 2019.
2021	Puzhayamma	Malayalam	Director, Story	
2017	Vishwaguru	Malayalam	Director, Story	Guinness record for fastest film produced (script to screen)
2017	Kathrikka Vendakka	Tamil	Producer	
2014	Thamara	Malayalam	Producer	Kerala Film Critics Association Award 2014 - Best Environmental film
2014	Paedithondan	Malayalam	Producer	
2009	Bhagavan	Malayalam	Producer	
2004	Quotation	Malayalam	Producer	
