= Manoj Tyagi =

Indian film director

- Occupations: Screenwriter; film director
- Years active: 2003–present

Manoj Tyagi is an Indian screenwriter and film director who works in Hindi films. He won the National Film Award for Best Screenplay for Page 3 (2005) and Apaharan (2006), along with the Filmfare Award for Best Screenplay for Page 3, which won the National Film Award for Best Feature Film. He made his directorial debut with Mumbai Salsa (2007) produced by Vikram Bhatt's ASA Films.

== Career ==
Tyagi worked for the companies, Xerox, Canon and ABN AMRO before relocating to Mumbai in 2002. He co-wrote Satta in 2003, with director Madhur Bhandarkar, which received critical acclaim. He went on to work with Bhandarkar for the films Aan: Men at Work (2004), Page 3 (2005), Corporate (2006) and Jail (2009).

== Filmography ==
=== As screenwriter ===
Year	Title	Notes
2003	Satta	
2004	Agnipankh	
2004	Aan: Men at Work	
2005	Page 3	
2005	Apaharan	
2005	Ek Ajnabee	
2005	Pehchaan	
2006	Taxi No. 9211	
2006	Corporate	
2007	Red: The Dark Side	
2007	Life Mein Kabhie Kabhiee	
2007	Victoria No. 203	
2007	Mumbai Salsa	Also director
2009	Jail	
2012	Heroine	
2013	Inkaar	
