= AVA Productions =

Indian film production company

- Type: Private
- Industry: Entertainment
- Founded: 2007; 19 years ago
- Founder: A. V. Anoop
- Headquarters: Chennai, India
- Products: Feature films; Documentaries; Short Film
- Website: ava-productions.com

AVA Productions is an Indian film production company based in Chennai. The company was established in 2007 by A. V. Anoop, who is presently the Managing Director of the AVA Group. The company predominantly produces Malayalam films.

== Films ==
Year	Title	Notes
2007	Pranayakalam	Feature Film
2007	Before The Brush Dropped	Kerala State Film Award for Best Documentary
2008	De Ingottu Nokkiye	Feature Film
2008	Appuvin Nayagan	56th National Film Awards for the Best Film on Family Values
2009	Paleri Manikyam: Oru Pathirakolapathakathinte Katha	Kerala State Film Award for Best Film
2010	Yugapurushan	Screened at 15th International Film Festival of Kerala
2010	Kadaksham	Feature Film
2011	Christian Brothers	Feature Film
2011	Chaaya	Screened at the 42nd IFFI Goa
2012	Aarohanam	Special Jury Award during Vijay TV Annual Film Award
2013	Aaru Sundarimaarude Katha	Feature Film
2013	Agnaye	NACT Short Film Award 2012–2014 for Best Documentary.
2014	Mr. Fraud	Feature Film
2014	Enna Satham Intha Neram	Feature Film
2014	Nerungi Vaa Muthamidathe	Feature Film
2016	School Bus	Feature Film
2016	Guppy	Feature Film
2016	Oru Muthassi Gadha	Feature Film, Screened at the Prague International Film Festival 2016
2017	Ezra	Feature Film
2017	Godha	Feature Film
2017	Where The Trees Sing	Documentary
2017	Vishwaguru	Feature Film, Karmarakthna Puraskar from South Indian Movie Awards
2019	Ishq	Feature Film
2019	Ambili	Feature Film
2019	Olu	Feature Film, National film Award for best Cinematography
2019	Neermizhipeelikal	Short Film
2019	Vishrutham	Short Film
2019	Appuvinte Sathyanweshanam	Feature Film, Kerala State Film Award for Best Child Artist
2020	Anveshanam	Feature Film
2020	Randaam Naal	Feature Film
2022	Political Correctness	Short Film
2022	Pada	Feature Film
2022	Yaanam	Documentary, Portrays India's dream project Mars Orbiter Mission (Mangalyaan). It is the 1st science documentary in Sanskrit language in the history of world cinema.
2022	The Green Man	Documentary
2023	Achan Oru Vaazha Vachu	Feature Film
2024	Sookshmadarshini	Feature Film
2025	Ayurveda-The double helix of life	Documentary
2025	Vilayath Buddha	Feature Film
2025	Alien Brihaspati	Short Film
2026	A Duck Tale	TBR
2026	Ananthathayilekk	Short Film
2026	Show Cause	Short Film
