= Khushboo (2008 film) =

- Directed by: Rajesh Ram Singh
- Written by: Dhiraj Gaikwad
- Produced by: Pahlaj Nihalani
- Starring: Rishi Rehan, Avantikka
- Cinematography: C Vijayasri
- Edited by: Sanjay Sankla
- Music by: Adnan Sami; Lyrics: Javed Akhtar
- Release date: 20 June 2008
- Country: India
- Language: Hindi

Khushboo (English: Aroma) is a 2008 Hindi romantic movie directed by Rajesh Ram Singh. The lead actors, Rishi Rehan and Avantikka, both made their Bollywood debuts with this film. The film was released in theaters on 20 June 2008. It is similar in theme as Fools Rush In, a 1997 romantic comedy directed by Andy Tennant and starring Matthew Perry and Salma Hayek.

== Plot ==
A young, ambitious and successful professional like Raghu needs to go to Chandigarh before his posting to New York as his last assignment. For Raghu career takes top priority in his life.

In Chandigarh, he seems to be destined to cross path with a girl to whom he is inadvertently drawn. But each time Pinky flits away even before he can approach her. When they do meet and get to know each other they realize that they share a very strong bonding. And as usual Pinky once again vanishes from Raghu’s life. When they accidentally bump into each other months later, Pinky has one request...that he meet her family just once. For Pinki family takes top priority in her life.

Raghu meets the big, boisterous Punjabi family only to be drawn into the warmth of the large family. Will Raghu be able to turn his back on a loving family? Will Raghu marry Pinky? Will Pinky change her mind about letting him go? Is career more important than a loving family? Raghu is in a dilemma but not Pinky... Khusboo is a love story that spreads the fragrance of love amidst strong family values...

== Cast ==
- Rishi Rehan as Raghu
- Avantikka as Pinky
- Ninad Kamat as Jaswinder Singh
- Himani Shivpuri as Satwant Kaur
- Prem Chopra as Subedar Harmeet Singh
- Raj Babbar as Subedar Harmeet Singh
- Shakti Kapoor as Chugh
- Vivek Marwah
- Aastha Rathore
- Dolly Bindra
- Vindu Dara Singh
- Bikramjeet Kanwarpal
- Naseer Abdullah as Captain R. Aiyar

== Soundtrack ==
The music was composed by Adnan Sami. The lyrics were written by Javed Akhtar.

- Paake Tujhe - KK
- Kyon Hai Mujhe Lagta - Adnan Sami, Shreya Ghoshal
- Tum Jo Mile Humko - Adnan Sami, Mahalakshmi Iyer
- Kyon Hai Mujhe Lagta - Remix
- Dil Yeh Kahe - Shaan, Sunidhi Chauhan
- Kya Hai Sochti Tu - Shankar Mahadevan, Shreya Ghoshal
- Badi Albeli Hai Tu - Udit Narayan, Sunidhi Chauhan
- Badi Albeli Hai Tu - Remix
- Dil Yeh Kahe - Remix
