= Jubair Muhammed =

Indian music composer and playback singer (b. 1994)

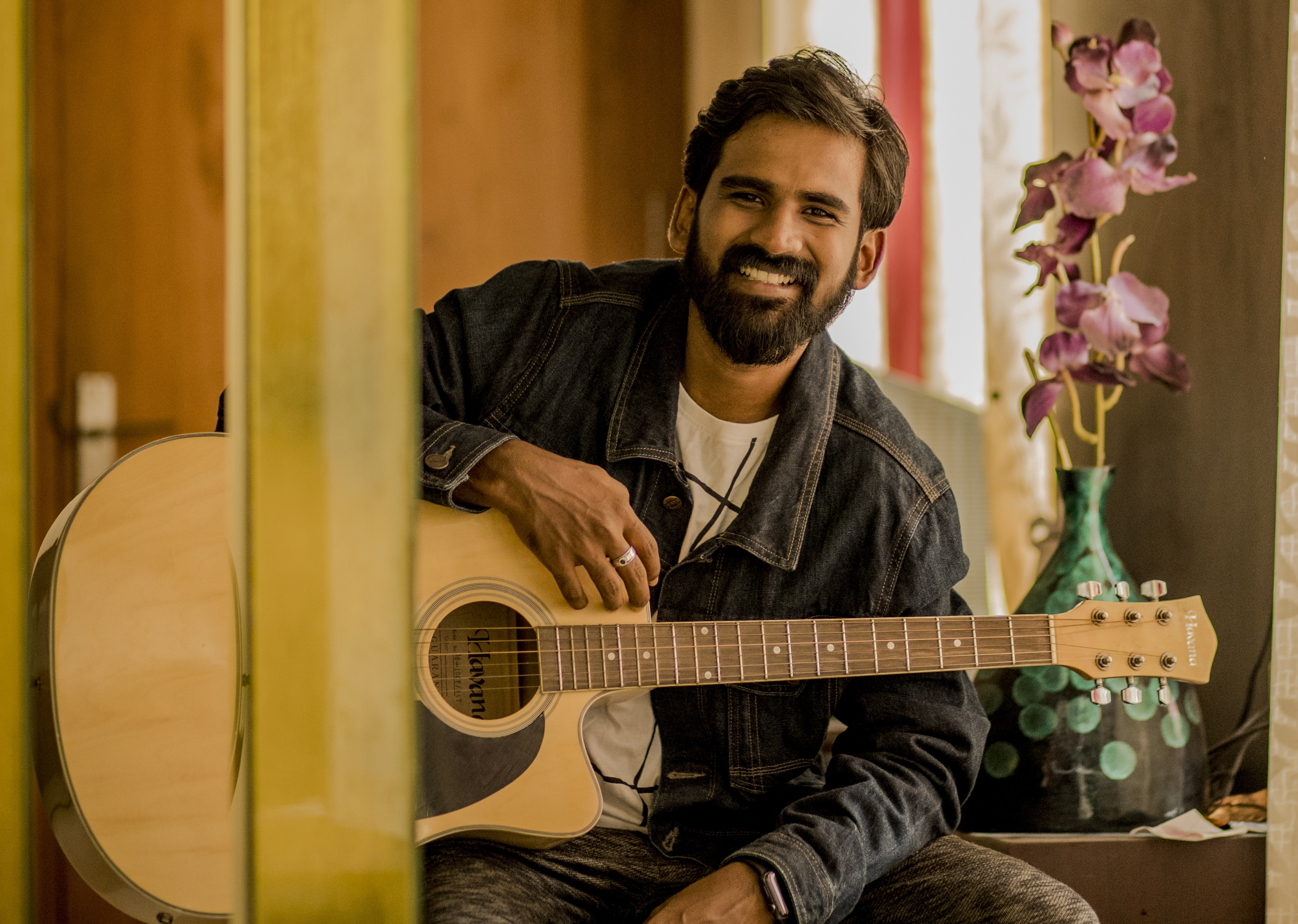

Background information
- Born: Thiruvananthapuram
- Genres: Film score
- Occupations: Music director; Singer; Record Producer; Songwriter
- Years active: 2015–present

Jubair Muhammed is an Indian music composer and playback singer who works in Malayalam cinema. Jubair has worked on Malayalam, Tamil, Kannada, Telugu and Hindi language films, Music Videos and Short Films.

== Early life ==
Jubair Muhammed was born to Abdul Shukkoor and Haseena Beevi in the town of Attingal, located within the Thiruvananthapuram district of Kerala, India. He did his schooling at the Government Higher Secondary School, Navaikulam, Kallambalam, and completed his bachelor's degree in Arabic literature from the University College Thiruvananthapuram. After the completion of his bachelor's degree, he started an interior design firm in his hometown.

== Career ==
Jubair entered the music industry by working on Short Films and television advertisements in Malayalam. His first film as a music director was an unreleased film in Tamil. His next work, which marked his entry to Malayalam cinema, was for the Malayalam film Chunkzz, directed by Omar Lulu. His guest appearance in Oru Adaar Love as a musician increased his popularity.

== Discography ==
=== Acting Credits ===
Year	Film	Role
2018	Oru Adaar Love	Stage Performer

=== Films ===
Year	Film	Language	Remarks
2017	Chunkzz	Malayalam	Music Director – Promo Song
2019	Netaji	Irula	Music Director
2019	Thamara	Thulu	Background Score
2019	Jeem Boom Bhaa	Malayalam	Music Director
2019	Old Is Gold	Malayalam	Music Director
2020	Sound of Pain	English	Music Director
	Peace	Malayalam	Music Director
2021	Ente Maavum Pookkum	Malayalam	Background Score
2022	Vichithram	Malayalam	Music Director

=== Albums ===
Year	Album	Language	Remarks
2016	Uyire Neeye En Kadhal	Tamil	Music Director
2017	Eighties	Malayalam	Music Director
2018	Raave	Malayalam	Music Director
2020	Last Seen	Kannada, Tamil, Telugu, Hindi	Music Director
2021	Tu Hi Hai Meri Zindagi	Hindi	Music Director
2021	Jaana Mere Jaana	Malayalam	Music Director
2021	Manasinte Ullil Ninnoliyunna	Malayalam	Music Director
2021	Neeyam Nizhalil	Malayalam	Music Director

=== Short films ===
Year	Short Film	Language	Remarks
2016	Orupad Thamasikum Orupad	Malayalam	Music Director
2018	Oh Thenju	Malayalam	Music Director
2018	Theeppetti Padam	Malayalam	Music Director
2018	Bridge	Malayalam	Music Director
2018	Countdown	Malayalam	Music Director
2018	Jeevanum Nidhiyum	Malayalam	Music Director
2018	Chaos Theory	Malayalam	Music Director
2018	Naahe	Malayalam	Music Director
2020	The Send Of Day	Malayalam	Background Score
2020	420 Fare's Fair	Malayalam	Music Director
2020	Vyakhyana	Kannada	Music Director

== Honours and awards ==
Jubair Muhammed made an entry into the Guinness World Records for the movie Netaji as a Music Director.

Guinness World Records

- Guinness Book of Records – Music Director for the movie Netaji

=== Others ===
- Official Theme song of Kerala University Festivals 2018
