= Adnan Sami =

Indian musician (born 1971)

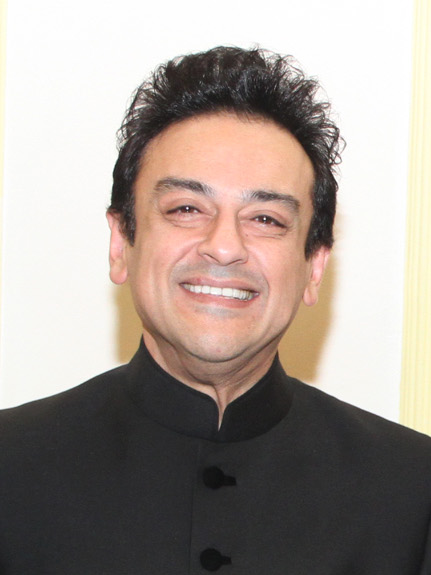
- Sami in 2016

Background information
- Born: Adnan Sami Khan; 15 August 1971 (age 55); London, England
- Origin: England
- Genres: Filmi, jazz, pop rock, fusion
- Occupations: Musician; Singer; Music Composer; Concert Pianist; Television presenter; Actor
- Instruments: Piano, keyboard, guitar, accordion, saxophone, violin, drums, bongos, congas, bass guitar, electric guitar, tabla, dholak, harmonium, harpsichord, santoor, sitar, sarod, percussion
- Years active: 1986–present
- Spouses: Zeba Bakhtiar (m. 1993; div. 1996) Sabah Galadari (m. 2001; div. 2003) (m. 2008; div. 2009) Roya Sami Khan (m. 2010)
- Award: Padma Shri

Adnan Sami Khan (born 15 August 1971) is an Indian singer, musician, composer, actor and pianist. He has performed Indian and Pakistani music in many languages, such as Hindi, Urdu, English, Telugu, Tamil, Kannada and Malayalam. He has been awarded with Padma Shri (India's fourth highest civilian award) for his contributions to music.

He was raised and educated in the United Kingdom. He renounced his Canadian citizenship and became a naturalised Indian citizen in 2016. He was born to Arshad Sami Khan, a Pakistani Air Force veteran and diplomat of Pashtun origin, and Naureen, who was originally from the Indian union territory of Jammu and Kashmir.

Able to play 32 musical instruments, his most notable instrument is the piano. He has been credited as "the first musician to have played the santoor and Indian classical music on the piano". A review in the US-based Keyboard magazine described him as the fastest keyboard player in the world and called him the keyboard discovery of the nineties. The Times of India has called him the "Sultan of Music".

== Early life and education ==
Sami was born in London, England on 15 August 1971. (Note: Though a PTI news report lists his birthplace as Lahore in Pakistan.) He was raised and educated in the United Kingdom. His father, Arshad Sami Khan, was a Pakistani Pashtun with roots in Afghanistan while his mother Naureen Khan was an Indian from Jammu. Actor Dilip Kumar (born Yusuf Khan) was his father's first cousin. Adnan's father served as a Pakistan Air Force pilot, before becoming a senior bureaucrat and serving as Pakistan's ambassador to 14 countries. His paternal great-great-grandfather, General Ahmed Jan, was from Afghanistan and a military advisor to king Abdur Rahman Khan. His paternal great-grandfather Agha Mehfooz Jan was the governor of four Afghan provinces under King Amanullah Khan's reign and was also the King's first cousin, while his paternal grandfather Abdul Sami Khan served as the Deputy Inspector General of Police. Agha Mehfooz Jan was assassinated by Habibullah Kalakani and therefore Sami's father's family migrated to Peshawar, then in British India. His younger brother Junaid Sami Khan is also a musician.

Sami attended Rugby School in Rugby, West Midlands, UK. Adnan followed his bachelor's degree with a law degree (LLB) from King's College London. He went on to qualify as a barrister from Lincoln's Inn, England.

He had played the piano since the age of five and composed his first piece of music when he was nine years old. Sami began taking lessons in Indian classical music from the santoor maestro Pandit Shivkumar Sharma when visiting India during his school vacations. Indian singer Asha Bhosle saw him at age ten at an R. D. Burman concert in London, and encouraged him to take up music as a career. He is an accomplished concert pianist, music composer and singer with a command of Indian and Western classical/semi-classical music, jazz, rock and pop music; he also did a rap song in 1991. As a teenager, Adnan, when performing on the piano on a TV program in Stockholm, was described by the US-based Keyboard magazine as the fastest man on keyboard in the world and the keyboard discovery of the nineties. Sami went on to learn Indian classical music from Pandit Shivkumar Sharma, the Santoor maestro in India. At the age of sixteen, Sami was approached to write a song for famine-hit Ethiopia, for which he won a special award from UNICEF.

In his career of 32 years, Sami has won many international awards including the Nigar Award, Bolan Academy Award and Graduate Award. Adnan is the youngest recipient of the Naushad Music Award for Excellence in Music. Previous recipients of this award include Lata Mangeshkar and Music Maestro Khayam. Sami was invited as a member of the jury of the music festival Voice of Asia competition held annually at Almaty, Kazakhstan.

== Career ==
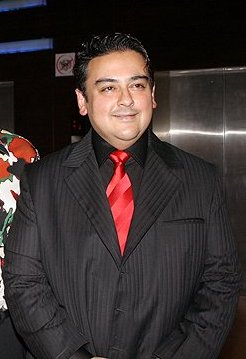
Adnan Sami at the release party for his album Kisi Din

=== Albums and notable singles ===
His first single, "Run for His Life", was released in 1986. It was in English, and recorded for UNICEF. It went to No. 1 in the music charts in the Middle East. This was followed by three more No. 1s: "Talk to Me", "Hot Summer Day" and "You're My Best Kept Secret".

His first formal album, The One & Only (1989), was a classical album on the piano accompanied by tabla maestro Zakir Hussain. He released his first vocal solo album Raag Time in 1991.

In 2000, Asha Bhosle collaborated with Sami on a collection of love songs named Kabhi to Nazar Milao in India. The music was also composed by Adnan. The album became an instant success and topped the Indipop charts for most of 2001 and 2002. According to Business Week magazine, the album sold 4 million copies in India alone.

His second studio album, Tera Chehra, was released in October 2002 to critical acclaim. The music videos for this album were shot by Binod Pradhan, who had shot the popular 2002 Hindi film Devdas. The album features Bollywood stars Rani Mukerji in the title track and Amitabh Bachchan in the track "Kabhi Nahi", who also sang the duet with Sami. Actress Mahima Chaudhry was also seen in another song. The title track was written by well-known Hindi movie lyricist Sameer. According to Screen Magazine, it was the only successful pop album of the year. Sami's Tera Chehra broke sales records by becoming India's best-selling album of 2002 (including film soundtracks), continuing its No. 1 position in 2003, and by becoming the best-selling Indian album of all time (including film soundtracks) in the US and Canada. The album stayed in the No. 1 position in all the music charts of India from the time of its release in September 2002 for over a year, beating his debut album's No. 1 record. His most successful albums have been Kabhi To Nazar Milao (with Asha Bhosle) and Tera Chehra, and his music videos usually have had Bollywood stars in them, including Namrata Shirodkar ("Bheegi Bheegi Raat"), Mahima Chaudhry, Raveena Tandon, Rani Mukerji ("Tera Chehra"), Govinda, Fardeen Khan, Amisha Patel ("O Meri Jaan"), Bhumika Chawla ("Maahiya"), Dia Mirza ("Pal Do Pal") and Amitabh Bachchan (Kabhi Nahi). He has composed film music for several other Hindi films, including Lucky: No Time for Love, Yeh Raaste Hain Pyar Ke, Dhamaal, 1920, Chance Pe Dance, Mumbai Salsa, Khubsoorat, Sadiyaan, Shaurya and several others.

=== Film composer ===
In 1994, he composed music for a film for the first time. The 1995 Pakistani film Sargam, in which he was the lead actor and Indian playback singer Asha Bhosle did the playback Sargam, was a box office success. It was also the first time that an Indian playback singer was featured in an album in Pakistan. To date Sargam is the only film Sami has acted in, and the score is the best-selling album of all time in Pakistan. Later, he would say that Sanjay Leela Bhansali's Hum Dil De Chuke Sanam, released in 1999, was a "copy" of Sargam.

He soon became popular, which led Hindi filmmaker Boney Kapoor to invite him to provide music for his film. This was the beginning for him to compose and sing for Hindi films and for the top Hindi film producers of the time like Yash Chopra and Subhash Ghai. Due to the popularity of his music videos and live performances, he started getting acting offers at the same time.

The song "Tu Sirf Mera Mehboob" from the Hindi film Ajnabee, sung by Adnan, became popular and was declared a "superhit" by Screen Magazine, who called him the pop personality of the year in 2001.

Saathiya (2002) brought him the opportunity to work with A. R. Rahman in the form of "Aye Udi Udi". According to Screen Magazine, the song was "the highlight of the album". Rediff.com called him the "Reigning King of Indipop" in early 2003 based on the sales of his albums in the previous two years.

In 2015, he sung the qawwali song "Bhar Do Jholi Meri", composed by Pritam for Salman Khan starred film Bajrangi Bhaijaain, he appeared in the movie as well.

=== Illness and weight loss ===
In 2005, he suffered from lymphoedema and developed an abscess in the knee, which interrupted his career.

In 2006, he took a sabbatical and reportedly lost 130 kg.

=== As a concert pianist ===
As a classical concert pianist, Sami has given solo performances before royalty such as the King of Sweden and King Hussein of Jordan. He has performed before heads of state and governments such as President Mitterrand of France, the President of the United Arab Emirates, the President and Prime Minister of India, the President and Prime Minister of Pakistan, the President and Prime Minister of Kazakhstan, the Prime Minister of Kyrgyzstan, the Prime Minister of Sweden and Princess Christina of Sweden. Adnan has performed for music festivals to sold-out stadiums of his solo concert tours all over the world in over forty countries.

=== Composing for events ===
Sami wrote a song for India during the 2003 Cricket World Cup. The video of this song captures the nationalistic spirit of competition, depicting Adnan performing with the Indian cricket team with guest appearances from Indian film stars like Amitabh Bachchan, Abhishek Bachchan, Fardeen Khan and Kareena Kapoor.

=== Television ===
He hosted the Indian version of the American music game show Don't Forget the Lyrics! called Bol Baby Bol on the Star TV network in 2008. Prior to that in 2005, he was the sole jury for the singing competition program on Channel [V] called Super Singer. In 2011, Adnan returned as a judge on the singing reality show Sa Re Ga Ma Pa L'il Champs, which became popular worldwide.

== Awards and recognition ==
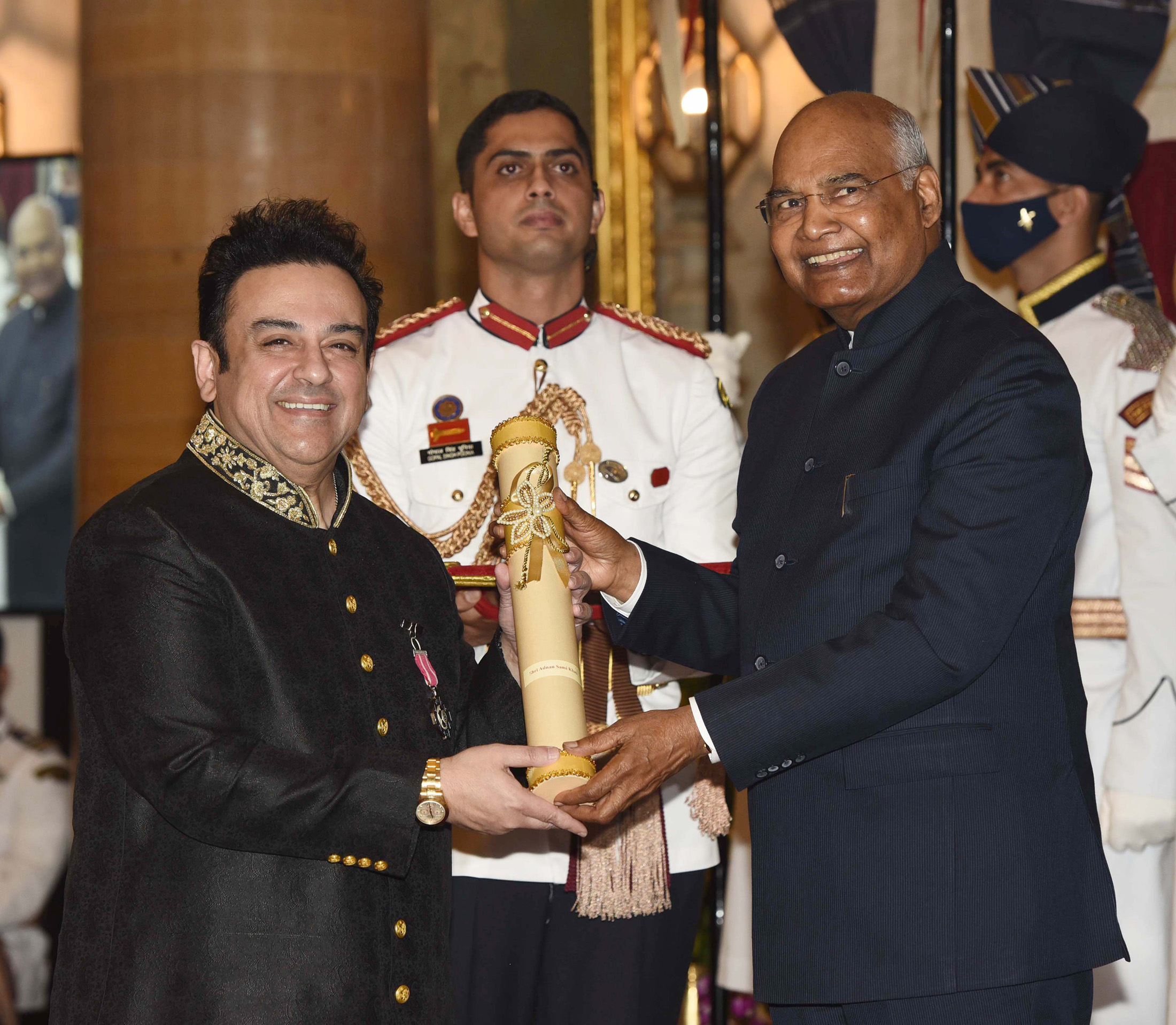
Sami being awarded Padma Shri, c. 2021

Sami has won a number of international awards, including the Nigar Award, the Bolan Academy Award, and the Graduate Award. He was given a special award by UNICEF for the song he wrote for famine-hit Ethiopia as a teenager and a United Nations Peace Medal for a song he wrote and performed for Africa.

A review of his piano solo performance on British TV Channel 4 in Keyboard magazine called him the "Keyboard Discovery of the 90s".

In 2001, he was awarded the Breakthrough Artist of the Year by MTV.

Swedish and British radio and television have often referred to him as the fastest keyboard player in the world. Adnan has performed for prestigious music festivals to sold-out stadiums of his solo concert tours all over the world in over forty countries. In summer 2003, he became the only Asian artist to have sold out Wembley Stadium, London, for two consecutive nights, which won him a place in the Limca Book of Records.

In 2008, he was presented the "Naushad Music Award" by Andhra Pradesh Department of Culture, in Hyderabad.

In 2008 he also won "Best International Act" at the UK Asian Music Awards.

In 2013, he was given the BrandLaureate International Brand Personality award by the President of The BrandLaureate, Dr KK Johan, in Kuala Lumpur, Malaysia.

In April 2017, Sami became the first South Asian to have performed at London's Wembley Stadium 8 times; tickets were sold out on all 8 occasions. The Mayor of London, Sadiq Khan, attended the concert.

In January 2020, he was awarded the Padma Shri, India's fourth highest civilian honour in the field of Arts, by Government of India. He received the award from President of India on 8 November 2021 In 2010, Sami received the "Lifetime Achievement Award" from the Prime Minister of Pakistan at a ceremony by Pakistan Television.

In 2011, Sami was given the "Glory of India Award" by the India International Friendship Society. This was the 350th anniversary of the completion of the Taj Mahal, and Sami gave a solo concert performance in front of the Taj Mahal on the final night of the celebrations. After this performance, the Indian media dubbed him the "Sultan of Music".

== Business endorsements ==
In 2002, Pepsi Foods made Sami its brand ambassador in India, a contract which involved hosting a series of live music concerts across cities as well as featuring in ads for Pepsi products. He is the only artist in all of Asia and Europe to have endorsed Pepsi Cola and Coca-Cola together.

== Personal life ==
Sami first married to actress Zeba Bakhtiar in 1993, with whom he had a son named Azaan Sami Khan. They divorced after three years.

Sami began living in India since 13 March 2001, on a visitor's visa which was extended from time to time.

In 2001, Sami married Dubai-based Arab Sabah Galadari. This was his second marriage and Sabah's second marriage as well; she had a son from her previous marriage. This relationship also ended in divorce, a year-and-a-half later.

In June 2006, he weighed 230 kilograms (506 lb); he claimed his doctor had given him just six months to live. By diet and exercise, he lost 120 kilograms (260 lb) in 16 months.

In 2008, his wife Sabah returned to Mumbai, remarried him and began living with him, but the marriage only lasted one year, after which Sabah filed for divorce again.

In 2009, his father died of pancreatic cancer, which he described as the "biggest blow" of his life, saying that he had been extremely close to his father.

On 29 January 2010 Sami married Roya Sami Khan (born Faryabi), an Afghan engineer who has worked in the telecom industry in Germany, and the daughter of a retired diplomat and army general. He first met Roya in India during her visit in 2010 and proposed to her after some time. On 10 May 2017, he became a father to a daughter, Medina Sami Khan.

On 26 May 2015, he submitted a request for Indian citizenship to the Ministry of Home Affairs, when his Pakistani passport expired (he also held Canadian citizenship at the time), as the Government of Pakistan declined to renew his passport; he had lived an adequate number of years in India that made him eligible for Indian citizenship hence he naturalised as an Indian citizen. In late December 2015, the Indian Home Ministry approved his request for legal status as a citizen of India, effective as of 1 January 2016.

In an interview with Rajat Sharma on Aap Ki Adalat, which aired on 31 May 2025, Sami shared about his experiences about being denied Pakistani visa to visit his mother's funeral, which he watched on video call, and criticised the Pakistan Army and intelligence agency ISI for brainwashing youths into committing acts of terror across India while referring to the Pahalgam terror attack and the November 2008 Mumbai terror attack, besides looting the nation and begging for donations to fund their objectives. Sami also labelled Pakistani politician Fawad Chaudhry a joker for the latter's lack of credibility. Additionally, Sami expressed gratitude to the Government of India and the audience for giving him recognition, and credits Asha Bhosle for supporting his career and hosting him when he moved to India. Furthermore, Sami also expressed about being a foodie and showing himself as a hopeless romantic through his music.

== Filmography ==
=== As an actor ===
- Sargam (1995), Urdu movie, lead role.
- Bajrangi Bhaijaan (2015), Hindi movie, special appearance in the qawwali song "Bhar Do Jholi Meri".

=== As a playback singer ===
==== Urdu songs ====
Year	Film	Songs	Co-singers
1995	Sargam	"Aae Khuda, Aae Khuda, Jis Nay Ki Justuju"	
1995	Sargam	"Suhani Rutt Ayi, Mann Jhoomay"	Hamid Ali Khan, Hadiqa Kiyani
1995	Sargam	"Pall Do Pall Kay Hayn Andheray"	
1995	Sargam	"Bheega Hua Mousam Pyara"	
1995	Sargam	"Chamki Kiran, Khilay Purwa"	Hamid Ali Khan
1995	Sargam	"Kab Sey Khili Ho" (Classic music vs Pop music)	Maharaj Ghulam Hussain Kathak, Hadiqa
1995	Sargam	"Kya Hay, Yeh Uljhan Kya Hay...?"	Hadiqa Kiyani
1995	Sargam	"Zara Dholki Bajao Gorio"	Asha Bhosle
1995	Sargam	"Pyar Bina Jeena Nahin Jeena"	Hadiqa Kiyani
1995	Sargam	"Barse Badal, Dil Mein Halchal"	Hadiqa Kiyani

==== Hindi songs ====
Year	Film	Songs	Co-singers
2001	Ajnabee	"Tu Sirf Mera Mehboob"	Sunidhi Chauhan
2001	Yeh Teraa Ghar Yeh Meraa Ghar	"Kuch Pyar Bhi Kar"	
2001	Deewaanapan	"Nach Nach Nach"	Falguni Pathak, Sukhwinder Singh
2002	Junoon	"Aankhon Ne Kiya Ishara" – (Duet)	Kavita Subramaniam
2002	Junoon	"Aankhon Ne Kiya Ishara" – (Male)	
2002	Ab Ke Baras	"Mujhe Rab Se Pyaar"	Anuradha Sriram
2002	Awara Paagal Deewana	"Ya Habibi"	Shaan, Sunidhi Chauhan
2002	Chor Machaaye Shor	"Ishqan Ishqan"	Karsan Sargathiya
2002	Shakti: The Power	"Dil Ne Pukara"	Alka Yagnik, Ravindre Sathe, Prakash
2002	Shakti: The Power	"Hum Tum Mile"	
2002	Pyaasa	"Tere Pyaar Ka Chhaya"	Sunidhi Chauhan
2002	Annarth	"Bewafa Bar Mein"	Pinky, Preeti
2002	Kehtaa Hai Dil Baar Baar	"Indian Se Aaia"	
2002	Karz: The Burden of Truth	"Aashiqui Ban Ke"	Kavita Subramaniam
2002	Saathiya	"Aye Udi Udi Udi"	
2003	Love at Times Square	"Aaja Aaja"	
2003	Love at Times Square	"Raat Hai Jawan"	
2003	Calcutta Mail	"Kahan Pe Meri Jaan"	Pamela Jain
2003	Chori Chori	"Ruthe Yaar Nu"	Sabri Brothers
2003	Koi... Mil Gaya	"Jadoo Jadoo"	Alka Yagnik
2003	Boys	"Boom Boom"	Sadhana Sargam
2003	Joggers' Park	"Ishq Hota Nahin Sabke Liye"	Zameer Kazmi
2003	Janasheen	"Nashe Nashe Mein Yaar"	Sunidhi Chauhan
2003	Sssshhh...	"Dheere Dheere Hua"	Alka Yagnik
2004	Plan	"Kaise Kaise"	Sunidhi Chauhan
2004	Tum – A Dangerous Obsession	"Kyun Mera Dil Tujhko Chaahe"	
2004	Muskaan	"Yaad Aayee"	
2004	Yuva	"Baadal"	Alka Yagnik
2004	Chot Aaj Isko, Kal Tere Ko	"Pani Re Pani"	Sunidhi Chauhan
2004	Naach	"Ishq Da Tadka"	Sonu Kakkar
2004	Aitraaz	"Gela Gela Gela"	Sunidhi Chauhan
2005	Sehar	"Palken Jhukaao Na"	Alka Yagnik
2005	Page 3	"Mere Wajood"	
2005	Jurm	"Nazrein Teri Nazrein"	
2005	Lucky: No Time for Love	"Shayad Yahi To Pyar Hai"	Lata Mangeshkar
2005	Lucky: No Time for Love	"Sun Zara"	
2005	Waqt: The Race Against Time	"Apne Jahanke"	Sonu Nigam
2005	Koi Mere Dil Mein Hai	"Bahon Mein Nahin Rehna"	Asha Bhosle
2005	Garam Masala	"Kiss Me Baby"	
2006	Rehguzar	"Allah Hu"	
2006	Taxi No. 9211	"Meter Down"	
2006	Taxi No. 9211	"Meter Down" (Rock N Roll Mix)	Guru Sharma (Remix)
2006	Kachchi Sadak	"Khwaja Mere Khwaja"	
2006	Khosla Ka Ghosla	"Sayane Hai Janaab"	
2006	Khosla Ka Ghosla	"Ab Kya Karenge Bhaiya"	
2006	Jaan-E-Mann	"Udh Jaana ?"	Kunal Ganjawala, Sunidhi Chauhan
2006	Jaan-E-Mann	"Udh Jaana ?" – Club Mix	Kunal Ganjawala, Sunidhi Chauhan
2007	Salaam-e-Ishq: A Tribute to Love	"Dil Kya Kare"	
2007	Life in a... Metro	"Baatein Kuch Ankahein Si"	
2007	Darling	"Saathiya"	Tulsi Kumar
2007	Darling	"Saathiya" (Remix)	Tulsi Kumar
2007	Dhamaal	"Chal Na Che Shor Machlein"	Shaan
2007	Dhamaal	"Dekho Dekho Dil Ye Bole"	Shaan
2007	Dhamaal	"Miss India Martee Mujhpe"	Amit Kumar
2007	No Smoking	"Jab Bhi Ciggaret" (Jazz)	
2007	Taare Zameen Par	"Mera Jahan"	Auriel Cordo, Ananya Wadkar
2007	Return of Hanuman	"Blackhole"	
2008	Shaurya	"Dheere Dheere"	Sunidhi Chauhan
2008	Superstar	"Don't I Love Or Do I Love U"	Sunidhi Chauhan
2008	U Me Aur Hum	"Jee Le"	Shreya Ghoshal
2008	U Me Aur Hum	"Phatte"	Sunidhi Chauhan
2008	U Me Aur Hum	"Dil Dhakda Hai"	Shreya Ghoshal
2008	Mumbai Salsa	"Choti Si Iltija"	
2008	Tahaan	"Jee Lo"	
2008	Khushboo	"Kyon Hai Mujhe Lagta"	
2008	Khushboo	"Tum Jo Mile Humko"	
2008	Khushboo	"Kyon Hai Mujhe Lagta" – (Remix)	
2008	Money Hai Toh Honey Hai	"Awaara Dil"	
2008	Kidnap	"Haan Ji"	
2008	Gumnaam – The Mystery	"Ishq Ne Kitna"	Shreya Ghoshal
2010	Dulha Mil Gaya	"Akela Dil"	Anushka Manchanda
2010	Dulha Mil Gaya	"Akela Dil" (Remix)	Anushka Manchanda
2010	My Name Is Khan	"Noor E Khuda"	Shreya Ghoshal, Shankar Mahadevan
2010	Click	"Click Click Click Click"	Shamir Tandon
2010	Sadiyaan	"Taron Bhari Hai Ye Raat Sajaan"	Sunidhi Chauhan
2010	Ek Second... Jo Zindagi Badal De?	"Hota Hai Har Faisala Ek Second Mein"	
2010	Ek Second... Jo Zindagi Badal De?	"Hota Hai Har Faisala Ek Second Mein" – (Remix)	
2012	Rush	"O Re Khuda"	Javed Bashir
2013	3G	"Bulbulliya"	
2014	Kill Dil	"Sweeta"	
2015	Bajrangi Bhaijaan	"Bhar Do Jholi Meri"	
2023	I Love You	"Yeh Nazar"	
2025	Param Sundari	"Bheegi Saree"	Shreya Ghoshal

==== Telugu songs ====
Year	Film	Songs	Composer(s)	Co-singers
2004	Shankar Dada MBBS	"Ye Jilla"	Devi Sri Prasad	Kalpana
2004	Varsham	"Nizam Pori"	Devi Sri Prasad	Suneeta Rao
2004	Yuva	"Vachindha Megham"	A. R. Rahman	Sujatha Mohan
2005	Mahanandi	"Katthilaanti Ammayi"	Kamalakar	Sujatha Mohan
2007	Yogi	"Gana Gana Gana"	Ramana Gogula	Sudha
2007	Aadavari Matalaku Arthale Verule	"Cheli Chamaku"	Yuvan Shankar Raja	Anushka Manchanda, Swetha
2007	Shankar Dada Zindabad	"Bhoogolamantha"	Shankar Mahadevan	Gopika Poornima
2009	Jayeebhava	"Zindhagi"	S. Thaman	Andriya
2010	Love To Love	"Kanulo"	Colonial Cousins	
2011	100% Love	"Infatuation"	Devi Sri Prasad	
2011	Oosaravelli	"Nenante"	Devi Sri Prasad	
2012	Ishq	"Oh Priya Priya"	Anup Rubens	Nithya Menen
2012	Julai	"Oh Madhu"	Devi Sri Prasad	
2012	Devudu Chesina Manushulu	"Nuvvantey Chala"	Raghu Kunche	
2012	Dhenikaina Ready	"Ninnu Chooda Kunda"	Chakri	
2012	Naa Ishtam	"Jillele Jillele"	Chakri	
2013	Gunde Jaari Gallanthayyinde	"Neeve Neeve"	Anup Rubens	
2014	Galipatam	"Hey Paaru"	Bheems Ceciroleo	
2014	Pandavulu Pandavulu Tummeda	"Guchi Guchi"	Bappa Lahiri	
2014	Power	"Devuda Devuda"	S. Thaman	
2014	Oka Laila Kosam	"O Cheli Nuvve Naa Cheli"	Anup Rubens	
2015	Bengal Tiger	"Banchan"	Bheems Ceciroleo	
2015	Dynamite	"Char Sou Chalees"	Achu Rajamani	
2015	Temper	"Choolenge Aasma"	Anup Rubens	Ramya Behara
2016	Krishnashtami	"Love Is True"	Dinesh	Solo
2017	Luckunnodu	"What Da F"	Praveen Lakkaraju	Praveen Lakkaraju
2018	Ishtanga	"Arerey Maaye"	Yelender Mahaveer	
2019	90ML	"Natho Nuvvunte Chalu"	Anup Rubens	Solo
2023	Rules Ranjann	"Dekho Mumbai"	Amresh Ganesh	Payal Dev

==== Tamil songs ====
Year	Film	Songs	Co-singers
2003	Boys	"Boom Boom"	Sadhana Sargam
2004	Aaytha Ezhuthu	"Nenjam Ellam"	Sujatha Mohan
2004	Sullan	"Kilu Kiluppana"	Premji Amaran, Pop Shalini
2007	Satham Podathey	"O Indha Kaadhal"	Yuvan Shankar Raja
2009	Siva Manasula Sakthi	"Oru Kal"	
2010	Chikku Bukku	"Vizhi Oru Paadhi"	Sujatha Mohan
2014	Veeram	"Thangame Thangame"	Priyadharshini
2023	Farhana	"Or Kadhal Kanaa"	Goldie Sohel, Harini Ivaturi

==== Kannada songs ====
Year	Film	Songs	Co-singers
2002	Super Star	"Bittaku Bittaku"	Shweta Malviya
2007	Soundarya	"Sneha Preethi"	
2008	Dheemaku	"Suryaane"	

==== Other languages ====
Year	Film	Songs	Co-singers
2005	Makalkku (Malayalam)	"Chanjadiyaadi"	
2011	Poley Poley Urey Mon (Assamese)	"Bor Bor Manuhor"	
2013	Hridayanath (Marathi)	"Aika Re Aika Re"	

=== As a music director and composer ===
- Sargam (1995)
- Yeh Raaste Hain Pyaar Ke (2001)
- Love at Times Square (2003)
- Lucky: No Time for Love (2005)
- Dhamaal (2007)
- Mumbai Salsa (2007)
- Khushboo (2008)
- 1920 (2008)
- Shaurya (2008)
- Daddy Cool (2009)
- Sadiyaan (2010)
- Chance Pe Dance (2010)

== Discography ==
Year	Album	Songs	Co-singers	Notes
1986	Live in Karachi	1. "Durga"		Music composed by Zakir Hussain
1986	Live in Karachi	2. "Folk Tune"		Music composed by Zakir Hussain
1986	Live in Karachi	3. "Jazz Piece"		Music composed by Zakir Hussain
1986	Live in Karachi	4. "Bageshri"		Music composed by Zakir Hussain
1989	Ecstasy	1. "Raag Bairagi"		Music composed by Zakir Hussain
1989	Ecstasy	2. "Folk Tune from N.W.F.P"		Music composed by Zakir Hussain
1989	Ecstasy	3. "Dhun in Mishr Khamaj"		Music composed by Zakir Hussain
1989	Ecstasy	4. "Dhun in Pillu"		Music composed by Zakir Hussain
1991	Raag Time	1. "Wahin Kahin Paao Gi"		
1991	Raag Time	2. Teri Yaad Aati Hay		
1991	Raag Time	3. "Raag Time"		
1991	Raag Time	4. "Kahan Bas Gay Ho"		
1991	Raag Time	5. "I Can Never"		
1991	Raag Time	6. "Feel Your Soul"		
1991	Raag Time	7. "Burning for You"		
1992	Behta Darya	1. "Durga"		
1995	Sargam	1. "Aae Khuda, aae Khuda"		
1995	Sargam	2. "Suhani rutt ayi"	Hamid Ali Khan, Hadiqa Kiyani	
1995	Sargam	3. "Pall do pall kay"		
1995	Sargam	4. "Bheega hua mousam"		
1995	Sargam	5. "Chamki kiran"	Hamid Ali Khan	
1995	Sargam	6. "Kab sey khili ho"	Maharaj Ghulam Hussain Kathak, Hadiqa Kiyani	
1995	Sargam	7. "Kya hay, yeh uljhan"	Hadiqa Kiyani	
1995	Sargam	8. "Zara Dholki bajao"	Asha Bhosle	
1995	Sargam	9. "Pyar bina jeena nahin"	Hadiqa Kiyani	
1995	Sargam	10. "Barse Badal"	Hadiqa Kiyani	
1995	Sargam	11. "Woh mujhay yaad"	Hadiqa Kiyani	
1997	Badaltey Mausam	1. "Badaltay Mausam"		
1997	Badaltey Mausam	2. "Kabhi to Nazar Milao"	Asha Bhosle	Featuring Salil Ankola & Aditi Govitrikar in music video.
1997	Badaltey Mausam	3. "Bahoon Kay Gheray"		
1997	Badaltey Mausam	4. "Pehli Wari"		
1997	Badaltey Mausam	5. "Hum Phir Milengay"		
1997	Badaltey Mausam	6. "Dil to Mera"		
1997	Badaltey Mausam	7. "Koi Rehta Hai"		
1997	Badaltey Mausam	8. "Aao Na"		
1997	Badaltey Mausam	9. "Nakhra Us Ka"		
2000	Always Yours	1. "Bheega Mausam"		
2000	Always Yours	2. "Bheegi Bheegi Raaton Mein"		
2000	Always Yours	3. "Bheegi Bheegi Raaton Mein (Unplugged)"		
2000	Always Yours	4. "Lift Karadey"		Featuring Govinda in music video.
2000	Always Yours	5. "Mehndi Masala"	Asha Bhosle	
2000	Always Yours	6. "Pyar Bina"	Asha Bhosle	
2002	Tera Chehra	1. "Kabhi Nahin"	Amitabh Bachchan	
2002	Tera Chehra	2. "Meri Yaad"		
2002	Tera Chehra	3. "Nain Se Nain"		Featuring Raveena Tandon in music video.
2002	Tera Chehra	4. "Roothey Hue"	Ft. Aarti Chhabria	
2002	Tera Chehra	5. "Sanson Mein"		
2002	Tera Chehra	6. "Tera Chehra"		Featuring Rani Mukherjee in music video.
2002	Tera Chehra	7. "Teri Baahon Mein"		Featuring Namrata Shirodkar in music video.
2002	Tera Chehra	8. "Tera Bina"		Featuring Mahima Chaudhry in music video.
2003	Kabhi To Nazar Milao	1. "Kabhi To Nazar Milao"	Asha Bhosle	Featuring Salil Ankola, Aditi Govitrikar
2003	Kabhi To Nazar Milao	2. "Pyar Hai"	Asha Bhosle	
2003	Kabhi To Nazar Milao	3. "Dholki"	Asha Bhosle	
2004	Teri Kasam	1. "Kasam"		Featuring Amisha Patel in music video.
2004	Teri Kasam	2. "Mahiya"		Featuring Bhoomika Chawla in music video.
2004	Teri Kasam	3. "Kabhi Aisa Lage"		Featuring Shonali Nagrani in music video.
2004	Teri Kasam	4. "Pal Do Pal"		Featuring Dia Mirza in music video.
2004	Teri Kasam	5. "Chand Nikla"		
2004	Teri Kasam	6. "Tauba!"		
2004	Teri Kasam	7. "Poocho..."		
2004	Teri Kasam	8. "Best Friend!"		
2007	Kisi Din	1. Asalaam Walekum		
2007	Kisi Din	2. Baarish		
2007	Kisi Din	3. Baarish (Unplugged)		
2007	Kisi Din	4. "Dekho Jaaneman"		
2007	Kisi Din	5. "Jharonkha"		
2007	Kisi Din	6. "Kisi Din"		
2007	Kisi Din	7. "Kisi Din (Remix)"		
2007	Kisi Din	8. "Koi Rehta Hai"		
2007	Kisi Din	9. "Sargaroshi"		
2007	Kisi Din	10. "Teri Yaad"		
2007	Kisi Din	11. "Teri Yaad (Remix)"		
2007	Kisi Din	12. "Best Friend"		
2009	Ek Ladki Deewani Si	1. "Chalo"		
2009	Ek Ladki Deewani Si	2. "Dekha Tujhe"	Tulsi Kumar	
2009	Ek Ladki Deewani Si	3. "Ek Ladki"		
2009	Ek Ladki Deewani Si	4. "Laila"		
2009	Ek Ladki Deewani Si	5. "Let's Go Mumbai City"	Jermaine Jackson	
2009	Ek Ladki Deewani Si	6. "Let's Go Mumbai City (Remix)"		
2009	Ek Ladki Deewani Si	7. "Mehfooz"		
2009	Ek Ladki Deewani Si	8. "Sharmili"		
2009	Ek Ladki Deewani Si	9. "Tu Salaamat Rahe"		
2013	Press Play	1. "Ali Ali"		
2013	Press Play	2. "Roya"		
2013	Press Play	3. "Mere Baap"		
2013	Press Play	4. "Kudi Tight"		
2013	Press Play	5. "Mein Tere Saath Hun"		
2013	Press Play	6. "Karun Na Yaad"		
2013	Press Play	7. "Baba"		
2013	Press Play	8. "Dua De"		
2013	Press Play	9. "Ali Ali (Remix)"		
2013	Press Play	10. "Roya (Remix)"		
2013	Press Play	11. "The Azaan (Call To Prayer)"		

Badaltay Mausam (1997) was re-released in India as Kabhi To Nazar Milao (2000).
