= Arshad Sami Khan =

Pakistani diplomat, civil servant and fighter pilot

Squadron leader Arshad Sami Khan Sitara-e-Jurat
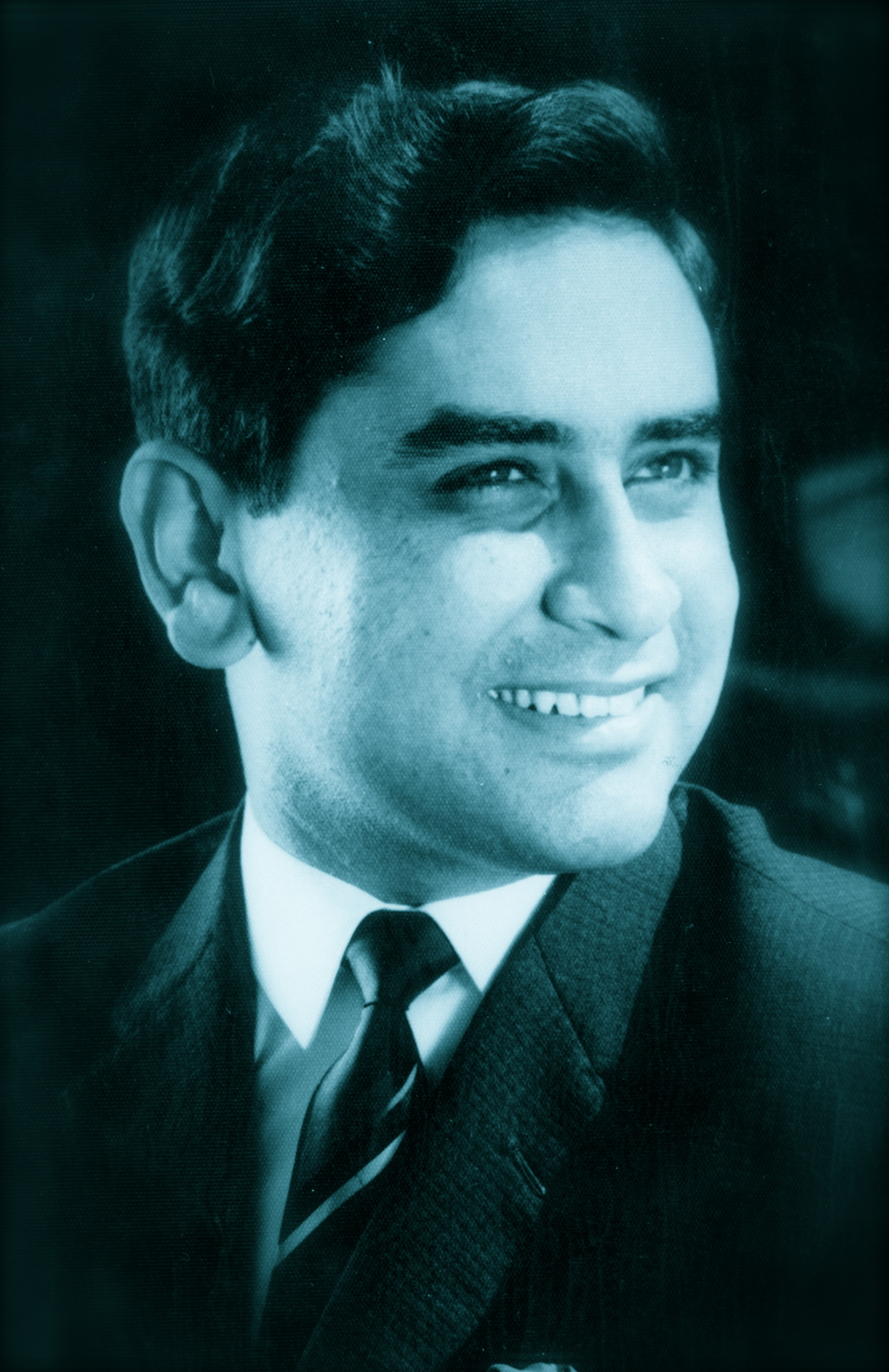
- Ambassador Arshad Sami Khan
- Born: 8 January 1942; Jalandhar, British India
- Died: 22 June 2009 (aged 67); Kokilaben Dhirubhai Ambani Hospital, Mumbai, India
- Spouse: Naureen Sami Khan
- Children: 2, including Adnan Sami
- Relatives: Dilip Kumar (cousin)
- Military career
- Allegiance: Pakistan
- Branch: Pakistan Air Force
- Rank: Squadron leader
- Conflicts: Indo-Pakistani War of 1965; Pathankot airstrikes
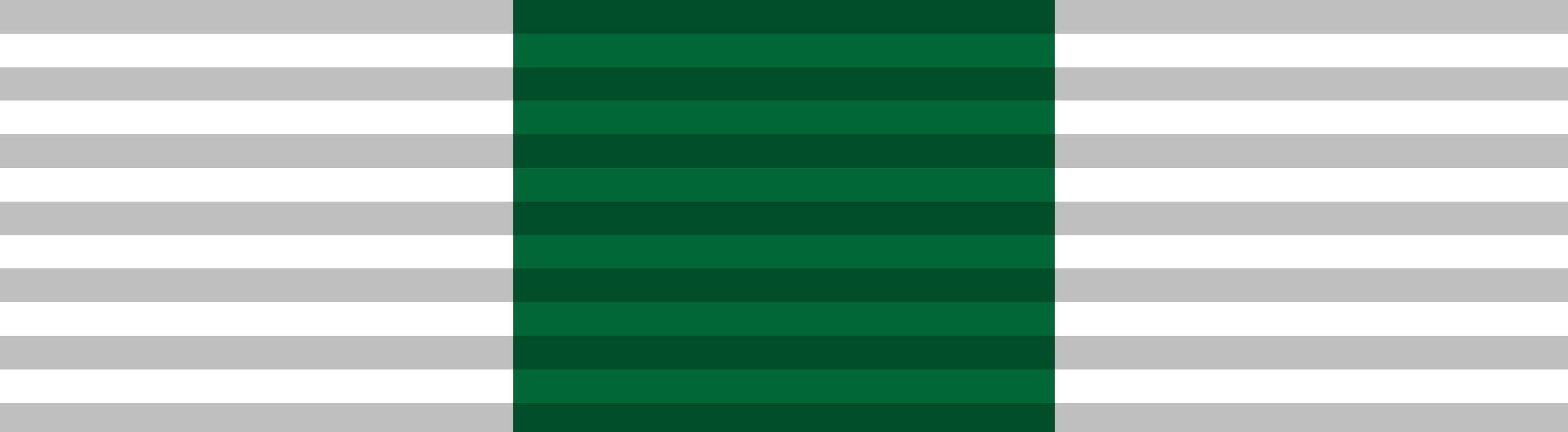
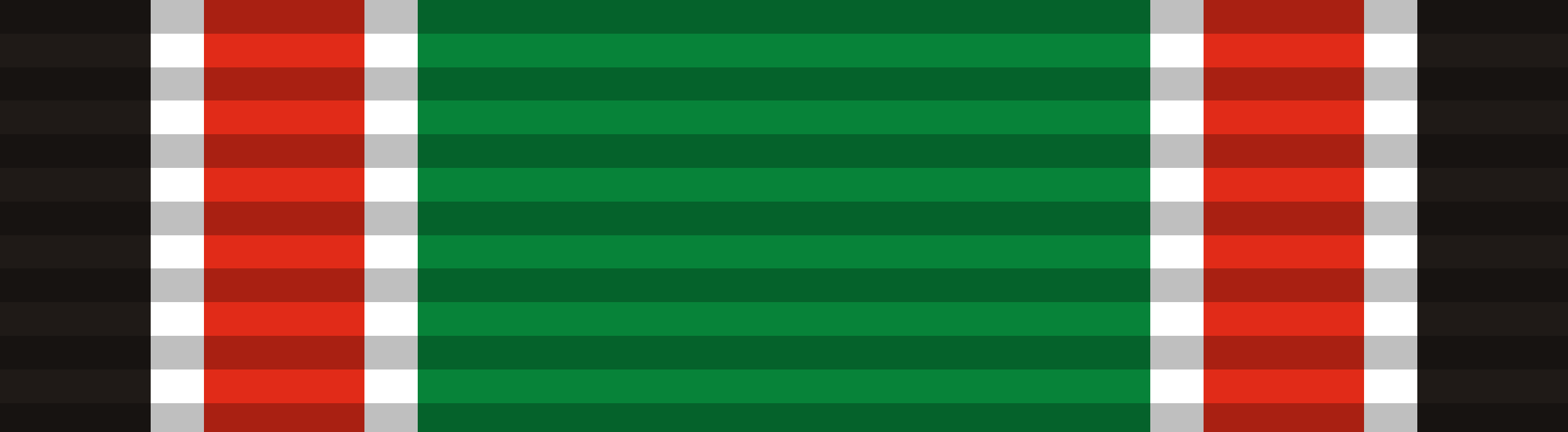
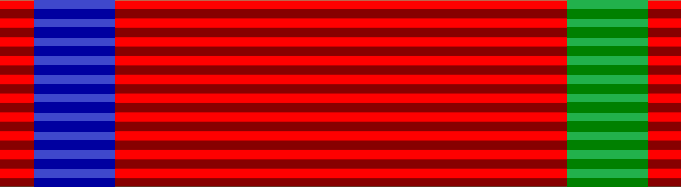
- Awards: Sitara-e-Jurat Sitara-i-Imtiaz Military Medal of Honour (Jordan) Military Medal of Honour (Pahlavi Iran) Military Medal of Honour (Turkey) Special Medal for Services to Humanity (United Nations)
- Other work: Diplomat, bureaucrat, author

Arshad Sami Khan (Urdu: ارشد سمیع خان; 8 January 1942 – 22 June 2009) was a Pakistani diplomat, civil servant and fighter pilot who attained the rank of Federal Secretary, the highest-ranking position in the Government of Pakistan. He started his career as a Pakistan Air Force fighter pilot and later served three presidents of Pakistan as their aide-de-camp (ADC) and later went on to the Ministry of Foreign Affairs where he served three presidents and four prime ministers as chief of protocol. He was later appointed a diplomatic ambassador of Pakistan to 14 countries. This was followed by his appointment as the first commissioner general of Pakistan. He was also Federal Secretary of Culture and retired as a top BPS-22 grade bureaucratic officer. He was also the father of singer and music composer Adnan Sami.

== Personal life ==
Arshad Sami Khan was born in January 1942 into an ethnic Pashtun family that had migrated from Afghanistan. His paternal grandfather, General Mehfooz Jan hailed from Herat, Afghanistan and was the governor of 4 provinces in Afghanistan, namely Herat, Kabul, Jalalabad and Balkh, during the reign of King Amanullah Khan. Khan's paternal great-grandfather General Ahmed Jan was the civil and military adviser as well as physician to Emir (king) Abdur Rahman Khan. General Ahmed Jan, the father of Gen. Mafooz Jan, was the conqueror of Kafiristan and named it Nuristan. However, at the time of the revolution during which Habibullah Kalakani became the first ruler of Persian descent in Afghanistan since Ahmad shah Abdali. Habibullah Kalakani with the support of the General Afghan population removed King Amanullah for his failure to bring any positive or foundational changes in Afghanistan that Khan's paternal grandfather, General Mehfooz Jan was executed, and as a result the family had to migrate to Peshawar which was a part of British India at that time.

He was a first cousin to Indian actor Dilip Kumar, born Yusuf Khan. Apart from Adnan Sami, his younger son Junaid Sami Khan is also a musician.

== Pakistan Air Force ==
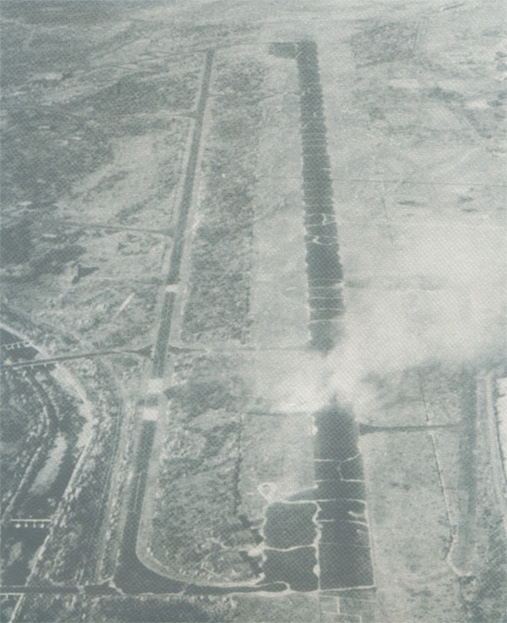
Smoke rises from Pathankot airbase during the airstrikes by the PAF's No. 19 Squadron.

Khan decided in his early years to follow the military traditions of his forefathers and joined the Pakistan Air Force. He participated in the Pakistan Air Force raid that destroyed the Pathankot air base during the Indo-Pakistani War of 1965. He became a national hero and was awarded the Sitara-e-Jurat, Pakistan's third highest military medal of honour for bravery. His name is honoured at the Pakistan Air Force Museum in Karachi. He was also the youngest recipient of the prestigious "Best Fighter Pilot's Trophy".

Khan also had the distinction of serving three presidents of Pakistan as their aide-de-camp (ADC); namely presidents Ayub Khan, Yahya Khan and Zulfiqar Ali Bhutto.

He retired from the Air Force in 1972 and joined the Foreign Service on the behest of President Zulfiqar Ali Bhutto.

== Ambassador ==
Arshad Sami Khan was appointed Pakistan's first ambassador to Estonia in August 1993 along with serving as ambassador to three other Scandinavian countries simultaneously: Sweden, Denmark and Norway. He served as Ambassador of Pakistan to ten other countries.

He was the chief of protocol to presidents Ghulam Ishaq Khan, Wasim Sajjad and Farooq A. Leghari and also served as Chief of Protocol to Prime Ministers Benazir Bhutto, Ghulam Mustafa Jatoi and Nawaz Sharif. Khan went on to become the first Commissioner General of Pakistan (appointed by Benazir Bhutto) and then a Federal Secretary to the Government of Pakistan. On the occasion of Independence Day on 14 August 2012, the President of Pakistan posthumously conferred Khan the third highest Civilian Award of Sitara-i-Imtiaz to honour his services to Pakistan.

== Author ==
Khan wrote a book about his experience as an aide-de-camp entitled Three Presidents and an Aide, which was released in March 2008 and went on to become a best-seller in South Asia. The book is a candid eyewitness account of historical events, seen from within the 'ring-side' that occurred during the reign of three presidents: Ayub Khan, Yahya Khan and Zulfiqar Ali Bhutto. No publisher in Pakistan was willing to publish the book. It was therefore published and released in India, launched by former Indian prime minister I.K. Gujral to rave reviews and sales.

== Illness ==
Khan was diagnosed with pancreatic cancer in 1989. Prime Minister Benazir Bhutto had him flown to London, where he was operated at Cromwell Hospital. However, within three months of the operation thereafter, he resumed working in the Foreign Office, continuing his ambassadorial assignments around the world while battling cancer for 20 years. He died on 22 June 2009 at 'Kokilaben Dhirubhai Ambani' Hospital in Mumbai. His burial ceremony took place in Islamabad with military honours, including a 21-gun salute.

== Awards ==
- Best Fighter Pilot's Trophy
- Military Medal of Honour from King Hussain of Jordan
- Military Medal of Honour from the Shah of Iran
- Military Medal of Honour from Turkey
- Special Medal for Services to Humanity from the United Nations
- Sitara-i-Imtiaz (posthumous; 2012)
- Sitara-e-Jurat

=== Sitara-e-Jurat citation ===
For his actions during the Indo-Pakistani War of 1965, Sami was awarded the Sitara-e-Jurat, the third highest award of Pakistan.

His Sitara-e-Jur'at citation read as follows:

CITATION

Flight Lieutenant Arshad Sami Khan

19 SQUADRON PAK/4127

Flight Lieutenant Arshad Sami Khan flew the maximum combat missions during the war with India. His enthusiasm and aggressive spirit was of the highest order and was responsible to ignite the spirit of competition amongst other pilots in its most effective form. He led formations in the battle area with exemplary determination and brought back excellent results. He has been credited with one aircraft,15 tanks and 22 vehicles destroyed and 8 tanks and 19 vehicles damaged and 2 heavy guns destroyed. He never looked tired or apprehensive in the face of heavy odds but kept on inflicting maximum damage to the enemy as his only objective. For his outstanding devotion to duty and bravery, Flight Lieutenant Arshad Sami Khan was awarded Sitara-i-Juraat.
