= Peace (2022 film) =

- Promotional poster
- Directed by: Sanfeer K
- Screenplay by: Safar Sanal; Ramesh Girija
- Story by: Sanfeer K
- Produced by: Thayaparan A.C
- Starring: Joju George; Asha Sharath
- Cinematography: Shameer Gibran
- Edited by: Noufal Abdullah
- Music by: Jubair Muhammed
- Production company: Script Doctor Pictures
- Release date: 26 August 2022
- Country: India
- Language: Malayalam

Peace is a 2022 Indian Malayalam-language black comedy film directed by Sanfeer K. The film stars Joju George, Asha Sharath and Mamukkoya in important roles. “The film tracks the chain of unprecedented events following an hyperlink narrative,” said the director. The Malayalam language version was released on 26 August, while Tamil, Telugu, Kannada and Hindi language versions are awaiting its release.

== Summary ==
Peace revolves around a string of events happening in Carlos's life.

== Cast ==
- Joju George as Carlos
- Asha Sharath as Jalaja
- Siddhique as Kajaji
- Remya Nambeesan as Dr.Angel
- Aditi Ravi as Renuka
- Shalu Rahim as Gibran
- Vijilesh Karayad as Jomon
- Mamukkoya as Sukumaran
- Anil Nedumangad as Dixon
- Kottayam Pradeep as Pathrose
- Arjun Singh as Melvin
- Unni Nair as Veerankutty

== Production ==
The principal photography of the film began on 15 November 2020. Sanfeer K, a scientist, launched himself as the director with 'Peace', following a narrative structure similar films like Super Deluxe, Andhadhun and Ludo. The production team of 'Script Doctor Pictures', signed actors Joju George, Asha Sharath, Siddhique, Aditi Ravi, Anil Nedumangad and Mamukkoya for major roles. The major locations of the film are Ernakulam and Thodupuzha, where actor Anil Nedumangad drowned while bathing near the Malankara Dam site. The actor had gone to bath with friends during a break when the mishap occurred on Christmas Day. Actress Asha Sharath plays a self made entrepreneur, who runs a local restaurant and works as an Auto rickshaw driver in the film and the character teaser revealed her name as Jalaja.Remya Nambeesan was signed to play Dr.Angel, a character with grey shades. Actors Mohanlal, Rakshith Shetty, Vijay Sethupathi and Bharat launched the film's official title poster through their social media pages. Singer Shahabaz Aman recorded a satirical song, written by Sanfeer K and composed by Jubair Muhammed. The trailer of the film was released on 4 August 2022, with The Times of India saying that, "the movie promises to offer thrills and chills".

== Soundtrack ==
The songs were tuned by Jubair Muhammed for the lyrics written by Sanfeer K and Dinu Mohan. 'Kallatharam..' song has Sanfeer K also, as composer. Shahabaz Aman and Joju George are among the playback singers of the film.

No.	Title	Artist(s)	Length
1.	"Kallatharam annumuthalinnu vare..."	Joju George	02:57
2.	"Mama Chayel Urumbu..."	Shahabaz Aman	02:49

== Release ==
Peace had a theatrical release on 26 August 2022. The film was released through the SunNXT OTT platform on 5 October 2022.

== Critical response ==
Princy Alexander of Onmanorama mentioned that "The film scores well in the climax, and the movie ends with a promise of a second part". Aparna Prasanthi of Malayalam Indian Express appreciated the movie as a "Non-linear experimental film", but also stated that it's not everyone's cup of tea. Tony of ManoramaOnline stated that the film is an enjoyable black humour fun ride and appreciated the director for showing maturity in his debut film itself. A reviewer of Asianet News called the movie as a thrilling and enjoyable film, appreciating the entire cast, the twist in climax and the debutant director.
