= Aan: Men at Work =

- Theatrical release poster
- Directed by: Madhur Bhandarkar
- Written by: Sanjeev Puri; Manoj Tyagi; Hriday Lani
- Produced by: Firoz A. Nadiadwala
- Starring: Shatrughan Sinha; Akshay Kumar; Suniel Shetty; Paresh Rawal; Jackie Shroff; Irrfan Khan; Raveena Tandon; Lara Dutta; Om Puri; Rahul Dev; Manoj Joshi; Rajpal Yadav; Ravi Kishan
- Cinematography: Madhu Rao
- Edited by: Diwakar P. Bhonsle
- Music by: Songs: Anu Malik; Background Score: Franco Vaz
- Production company: Base Industries Group
- Release date: 4 June 2004
- Running time: 165 minutes
- Country: India
- Language: Hindi

Aan: Men at Work (translation: Pride: Men at Work) is a 2004 Indian Hindi-language action drama film directed by Madhur Bhandarkar. It stars an ensemble cast consisting of Shatrughan Sinha, Akshay Kumar, Suniel Shetty and Paresh Rawal in the leading roles, with Jackie Shroff, Irrfan Khan, Raveena Tandon, Lara Dutta, Om Puri, Rahul Dev, Manoj Joshi, Rajpal Yadav, Preeti Jhangiani and Ravi Kishan in supporting roles. It was released on 4 June 2004.

== Plot ==
Crime is at its highest peak in Mumbai, with it split in three ways. Gautam Walia, a ruthless businessman, has one-third, Manik Rao, the Home Minister, has one-third, and Yusuf Pathan, a big-time goon, has a third of the territory. The trio warns Raghu Shetty not to interfere with their business. Raghu pays no heed to their warning and ambushes Walia at a horse derby. Walia is alive, but Pathan kills Shetty's man, who carried on the hit. Shetty is then jailed. The crime rate rises with more smuggling, trading, and illegal activities soaring. Meanwhile, the detection unit cops of the Mumbai Crime Branch work constantly to stop this.

Senior Inspector Vikram Singh, who was a hero once upon a time in the crime department, now prefers to handle the easy jobs. Sub-Inspector Appa Kadam Naik is an encounter specialist who goes after the henchmen instead of the bosses; he is married to Janki, and they have a son named Rahul. Head Constable Khaled Ansari is a happy-go-lucky cop and chews Paan all the time. Kelkar is another cop who talks on the phone all the time. The four men's fate changes with the arrival of their new boss.

Deputy Commissioner of Police Officer Hari Om Pattnaik arrives and realizes that the other cops are not serious and that no one is following the rules and regulations. Hari has a girlfriend, Kiran, whom he intends to marry. He is hesitant about his promotion, as he thinks that this promotion is done deliberately to kick him out, but he learns to accept it. He witnesses the way the others treat the henchmen and orders them to be released. Meanwhile, tensions between a businessman named Ajit Pradhan and the trio of Pathans, Walia and Manik Rao, force Pradhan to be on their side and is killed by Yusuf Pathan's younger brother, Baba "Yeda" Pathan, when the former refuses. But during an encounter at a dance bar where Yeda is found with his gang, a shootout ensues, and Khaled is killed during the shootout, making the policemen seek revenge.

Vikram and Appa decide to join Hari and help him clear the city, starting by killing Yeda. After that, they arrest Yusuf Pathan, which puts a halt to small-time criminal activities in Mumbai. Simultaneously, Raghu Shetty replaces Pathan to run the illegal businesses which Pathan was handling. During the climax, Appa dies in a trap set by Kelkar. Vikram and Hari track Raghu Shetty and a hawala trader named Hirachand Mehta at the Flying Club with the help of a tip given to Vikram by Roshni Varma, Walia's keep. The police try to block the plane at the runway, but to no use. Finally, Hari damages the left wing and the back engine of the plane with a helicopter. The plane crashes into a hangar. Shetty and his goons try to escape but are killed. Vikram kills Shetty. Hirachand is arrested, and Kelkar's corrupt actions are caught by Vikram and Hari. If left alive, he will be bailed out by the lawyers, so Vikram kills Kelkar.

The arguments in the court are in the favour of Walia and his men. During the break, Vikram and Hari threaten the corrupt judge to change his judgement. The judgement is in the acceptance of the police, and the case is closed. Commissioner Khurrana, DCP Om, and Vikram walk out of the courtroom happily. Hari says that Mumbai is crime-free. Vikram then shows a list of gangsters that had to be encountered by Appa, to which Hari agrees. He then meets Kiran, who says that she is proud of him.

== Cast ==
- Shatrughan Sinha as Senior Inspector Vikram Singh
- Jackie Shroff as Gautam Walia, a renowned and corrupt businessman
- Akshay Kumar as DCP Hari Om Patnaik
- Suniel Shetty as Sub-Inspector Appa Kadam Naik, an encounter specialist
- Raveena Tandon as Roshni Varma
- Lara Dutta as Kiran Kumar, Hari's girlfriend
- Preeti Jhangiani as Janki Naik, Appa's wife
- Paresh Rawal as Head Constable Khalid Ansari
- Irrfan Khan as Yusuf Pathan, the leader of the Pathan gang
- Om Puri as Police Commissioner Khurana
- Rahul Dev as Baba "Yeda" Pathan, Yusuf's short-tempered younger brother
- Rajpal Yadav as Apte, Manik Rao's personal assistant
- Vijay Raaz as Vaaman
- Hemant Pandey as Gautam Walia's assistant
- Manoj Joshi as Home Minister Manik Rao
- Milind Gunaji as Ajit Pradhan
- Ravi Kishan as Raghu Shetty, a gangster and rival of the Pathan gang
- Ajinkya Deo as Kelkar, a police officer in the Crime Branch who secretly works for Gautam Walia and Manik Rao
- Nawab Shah (actor) as Gangster in Raghu Shetty's bar
- Aanjjan Srivastav as Judge Sahani
- Xing Yu as Raghu Shetty's goon
- Shri Vallabh Vyas as Hirachand Mehta, a stockbroker and hawala trader
- Rajeev Mehta as Tawde (special appearance)
- Gauahar Khan in a special appearance in the song "Nasha"
- Reema Sen in a special appearance in the song "Jungi Ke Payal Bandhi Hai"

== Music ==
Aan: Men at Work

Soundtrack album by Anu Malik
- Released: 16 April 2004
- Genre: Feature film soundtrack
- Label: T-Series

All lyrics were written by Sameer.

1. "Dil Se Dilbar" - Kumar Sanu, Anuradha Paudwal
2. "Hamare Baad" - Shabbir Kumar, Udit Narayan, Ujwala, Sarika Kapoor
3. "Jab Tak Rahega" - Abhijeet, Anuradha Paudwal (Deleted Song)
4. "Hum Aapse" - Sonu Nigam, Alka Yagnik
5. "Koi Pyar Na Kare" - Shreya Ghoshal, Sonu Nigam
6. "Jugnu Ki Payal Bandhi Hai" - Zubeen Garg, Shaswati
7. "Nasha Nasha" - Sunidhi Chauhan
8. "Koi Pyar Na Kare" - Sonu Nigam

== Reception ==
Taran Adarsh of IndiaFM gave the film two stars out of five, writing, ″On the whole, those who prefer hardcore masala flicks [with loads of action] to feel-good entertainers will like AAN. At the box-office, the film has better chances at mass-oriented theatres [single screens], not multiplexes. While the masses will love the action scenes, the critics, gentry and family audiences, especially ladies, may not really go for it. Business in circuits like Uttar Pradesh, Bihar, Madhya Pradesh and Punjab should prove to be the best.″ H S Bunty of Rediff.com wrote, ″The action is ripped off every Hollywood film you know and is relentless. The tuneless songs, mercifully only three, are played just partially in the first half. The script is like a train that keeps going on and off the track after being late for 40 minutes.″
