= Netaji (film) =

Upcoming Irula-language film

- poster
- Directed by: Vijeesh Mani
- Written by: Vijeesh Mani (Story); U.PrasannaKumar (Screen play)
- Produced by: Johny Kuruvilla Padickamyalil; Vijeesh Mani
- Starring: Gokulam Gopalan; Master Alok; Felix Johnny Kuruvilla; Roji P. Kurian; RajeshB; Ashly Boban; Issac Pattanipparambil
- Cinematography: M. J. Radhakrishnan
- Edited by: Raahul ClubDe
- Music by: Jubair Muhammed
- Production companies: Johny International Group of Companies; Anaswara Charitable Trust
- Release date: 26 April 2019
- Running time: 91 minutes
- Country: India
- Language: Irula

Netaji (/neɪθɑːdʒɪ/) is a 2019 Indian film made in Irula language directed by Vijeesh Mani and produced by Johny Kuruvilla. The film stars Gokulam Gopalan in his first title role along with Master Alok and others. The film has M. J. Radhakrishnan as cinematographer and Harikumar Madhavan Nair as sound designer. The film was shot at Attappadi.

Netaji is officially India's first Irula language film, and the film won Guinness award for the first tribal language film. The film was also selected in the Indian Panorama section of IFFI Goa, 2019 as well as Bengaluru International Film Festival 2020.

== Summary ==
Netaji is the story of Virat (Master Alok) and his Grandfather Netaji Gopalakrishnan, who was with Subhas Chandra Bose's Indian National Army. Virat, a city based kid comes to stay with his grandfather, now staying with Irula tribe.

== Cast ==
- Gokulam Gopalan - Netaji Gopalakrishnan
- Master Alok - Virat
- Roji P. Kurian - Roji
- RajeshB - Maari
- Ashly Boban - Sarayu
- Baby Siyamol - Valli
- Issac Pattanipparambil - Gandhiyan Kumaran
- Prasannan Pillai - IB Officer
- Felix Johnny Kuruvilla - Rahul
- Murali Mattummal - Vaidhyar
- Aakash Boban - Aakash
- Sharafudeen - Siddharth
- Asmin - Meena

== Soundtrack ==
The music was composed by Jubair Muhammed and the lyrics were written by Dr. Prashanth Krishna.

- Namath Naadu Solai Naadu... - Jubair Mohammed (Singer)
- Va......Vayi.....Ya...Vai aggae.. - Adv. Gayathri R Nair (Singer)
- Swaelae...... Swaelae... - Varsha Renjith (Singer)

== Accolades ==
Year	Festival	Notes
2019	Guinness Record for First Tribal Language Film	

=== Screenings ===
Year	Festival	Notes
2019	International Film Festival of India, Goa	
2019	Siliguri International Film Festival	
2019	Chennai International Film Festival	
2020	Bengaluru International Film Festival	
2020	Kolhapur International Film Festival	
