= Puzhayamma =

2021 film directed by Vijeesh Mani

- Directed by: Vijeesh Mani
- Written by: Screenplay & Dialogues; Prakash Vadikkal
- Story by: Writer; Vijeesh Mani
- Produced by: Gokulam Gopalan
- Starring: Baby Meenakshi; Linda Arsenio; Thampi Antony; Master Virat Vijeesh; Prakash Chengal; Unni Raja; Ashly Boban; KPAC Leelakrishnan; Roji P. Kurian; Sanil Paingadan
- Cinematography: Loganathan Srinivasan
- Edited by: Raahul Clubde; Vijeesh Mani
- Music by: Kilimanoor Ramavarma
- Production companies: Sree Gokulam Movies; Anashwara Charitable Trust
- Release date: 1 July 2021
- Country: India
- Language: Malayalam

Puzhayamma (transl. Mother River) is a 2021 Indian Malayalam-language film produced by Gokulam Gopalan and directed by Vijeesh Mani. The film is completely shot in a river. Puzhayamma, based on River pollution, is an environmental film. The movie was released through JioCinema on July 1, 2021

The calamitous 2018 Kerala floods play a major role in this film.

== Plot ==
Puzhayamma is based on the friendship between a 13-year-old girl Baby Meenakshi and an American tourist Linda Arsenio and the hurdles they had to face, when they tried to save a polluted river.

== Cast ==
- Baby Meenakshi
- Linda Arsenio
- Thampi Antony
- Prakash Chengal
- Unni Raja
- Ashly Boban
- KPAC Leelakrishnan
- Roji P. Kurian
- Sanil Paingadan
- Master Virat Vijeesh
- Fatima Al Mansoori
- Acharya Praveen Chauhan
