= Mumbai Salsa =

- Directed by: Manoj Tyagi
- Written by: Manoj Tyagi
- Produced by: Surendra Sharma, Amita Bishnoi
- Starring: Vir Das; Linda Arsenio; Manjari Phadnis; Dilip Thadeshwar
- Cinematography: Kalpesh Bhandarkar
- Edited by: Kuldip K. Mehan
- Music by: Adnan Sami
- Distributed by: BVG Films; ASA Productions and Enterprises Pvt. Ltd.
- Release date: 26 October 2007
- Country: India
- Language: Hindi

Mumbai Salsa is a 2007 Indian Hindi-language film directed by Manoj Tyagi, starring Vir Das, Linda Arsenio, Manjari Fadnis and Dilip Thadeshwar.

== Plot ==
Four pairs meet accidentally in a Mumbai bar called Mumbai Salsa and get hooked on each other for life. The film captures the urban qualities of life and love.

Maya Chandhok lives a wealthy lifestyle in Delhi along with her parents. Refusing to buckle down to her mother's demands to get married, she re-locates to Kolkata, obtains her MBA, and then goes to reside in Mumbai, where she gets a job in a bank and shares a flat with two roommates, Zenobia and Neha. She meets with Sanjay, and both fall in love. Then one day he dramatically and publicly dumps her. A few days later she meets with Rajeev Sharma, who is heartbroken after his fiancée, Pooja, dumped him to relocate to America, and both are attracted to each other. She is delighted when he proposes to her, but her delight turns sour when he asks her to relocate with him to Singapore, drop her career, and be a homemaker for the rest of her life. Maya must now make up her mind amidst chaos and heartbreak that also threaten to tear apart the lives of both Neha and Zenobia, who are also dating Rajeev's friends, Karan Kapoor and Shaji, while conservative Tyagraj, Rajeev's pal, struggles with his feelings about a much liberated Caucasian co-worker, Pamela.

== Cast ==
- Vir Das as Rajeev 'Raj' Dhupia
- Linda Arsenio as Pamella
- Manjari Phadnis as Maya
- Amruta Khanvilkar as Neha
- Denzil Smith as Kay Kay
- Dilip Thadeshwar as Subbu
- Indraneil Sengupta as Karan
- Ray Irani as Shaji
- Neelam Chauhan as Xenobia
- Alisha Chinai

== Music ==
- "Akeli Hai Zindagi" - Shaan
- "Friday" - Gayatri Iyer
- "Friday (Female)" - Gayatri Iyer
- "Lets Do The Mumbai Saalsa" - Adnan Sami, Alisha Chinai
- "Pyar Se" (Male) - Amit Kumar
- "Choti Si Iltaza" - Adnan Sami
- "Mumbai Salsa (Female)" - Alisha Chinai
- "Pyaar Se" - Shaan, Shreya Ghoshal
- "Saalsa Instrumental" - Instrumental

== Reception ==
Taran Adarsh of Bollywood Hungama rated the film two out of five and wrote that "On the whole, MUMBAI SALSA is targeted at the youth living in Mumbai mainly". A critic from The Times of India rated the film three-and-a-half out of five stars and wrote that "EASY to label this one as Metro, part two. But Mumbai Salsa has a freshness and an innovative feel that makes it watchable despite the fact that it follows Metro's tale of sizing up the cosmosexual lifestyle in New Age yuppie India".
