= Kabul Express =

2006 Indian film by Kabir Khan

- Theatrical release poster
- Directed by: Kabir Khan
- Written by: Kabir Khan
- Produced by: Aditya Chopra
- Starring: John Abraham; Arshad Warsi; Salman Shahid; Hanif Humgaam; Linda Arsenio
- Cinematography: Anshuman Mahaley
- Edited by: Amitabh Shukla
- Music by: Songs: Raghav Sachar; Score: Julius Packiam
- Production company: Yash Raj Films
- Distributed by: Yash Raj Films
- Release dates: 11 September 2006 (Toronto); 15 December 2006 (India)
- Running time: 106 minutes
- Country: India
- Language: Hindi

Kabul Express is a 2006 Indian Hindi-language adventure thriller film directed by Kabir Khan and produced by Aditya Chopra under the banner of Yash Raj Films. The film stars John Abraham, Arshad Warsi, Salman Shahid, Hanif Humgaam, and Linda Arsenio. Set in post-Taliban Afghanistan, the narrative follows two Indian journalists who, while reporting from Kabul, are taken hostage by a former Taliban soldier, leading to a perilous journey across the war-torn country.

The film marked Khan's transition from documentary to feature filmmaking and was based in part on his and fellow journalist Rajan Kapoor's real-life experiences in Afghanistan. Kabul Express was shot entirely on location in Afghanistan, making it one of the first Indian films to be filmed there after the fall of the Taliban regime. The cinematography was handled by Anshuman Mahaley, with editing by Amitabh Shukla and music composed by Raghav Sachar.

Premiering at the 2006 Toronto International Film Festival, Kabul Express received praise for its visuals, themes, and performances, though it also generated controversy for its depiction of Afghan ethnic groups. It was released theatrically on 15 December 2006 and became a moderate commercial success, earning approximately ₹110 million (US$2.5 million) worldwide.

== Plot ==
Indian journalists Suhel Khan and Jai Kapoor arrive in post-Taliban Afghanistan to document the condition of the country following the 2001 U.S.-led invasion. Based in Kabul and working for Star News, they begin their journey through the country accompanied by Khyber, a local taxi driver who has witnessed decades of conflict. During their travels, they encounter Jessica Beckham, an American photojournalist working for Reuters, who joins them in covering the aftermath of the war.

While leaving the village of Ishtar, the group is held at gunpoint by Imran Khan Afridi, a former Taliban fighter who has disguised himself as a woman and hidden in the back of their vehicle. Imran forces them to drive him toward the Pakistan border, threatening violence if they do not comply. Along the way, the group travels through war-ravaged towns and observes the devastation left behind by years of conflict.

Jessica discovers that Imran is actually Jan Mohammed, a Pakistani non-commissioned officer who had infiltrated Afghanistan during the Soviet–Afghan War and later aligned with the Taliban. The group becomes increasingly tense as Imran's past and motives are revealed. At one point, the journalists attempt to escape, but Imran regains control. They are eventually stopped by American soldiers, leading to a brief standoff in which Suhel forces Imran to grant them an interview.

The group continues to the border, making a stop at Imran's former village, where he briefly reunites with his wife and daughter. Soon after, they are ambushed by Mujahideen fighters. Imran urges the others to escape while he stays behind to fight. He later reaches the Pakistan border alone and pleads with the Pakistani soldiers to let him in. They refuse, and Imran is shot and killed while trying to cross into Pakistan.

== Cast ==
- John Abraham as Suhel Khan
- Arshad Warsi as Jai Kapoor
- Salman Shahid as Imran Khan Afridi / Subedar Major Jaan Mohammad
- Hanif Humgaam as Khyber
- Linda Arsenio as Jessica Beckham
- Roshan Seth as Narrator (voiceover)

== Production ==
=== Development ===
Kabul Express was the feature film debut of Kabir Khan, who had previously directed documentaries in Afghanistan. The story was loosely based on his own experiences and those of his colleague Rajan Kapoor in post-Taliban Afghanistan. After several production houses declined to back the project, Yash Raj Films agreed to produce the film under Aditya Chopra.

=== Casting ===
John Abraham and Arshad Warsi were cast as the two Indian journalists. Pakistani actor Salman Shahid was selected to play Imran Khan Afridi, while Hanif Humgaam portrayed the Afghan taxi driver, Khyber. American actress Linda Arsenio played Jessica Beckham, a photojournalist. The casting brought together talent from India, Pakistan, Afghanistan, and the United States to reflect the film's international scope.

=== Filming ===
Filming began in September 2005 and lasted for 45 days in and around Kabul. Kabul Express was the first international film to be shot in Afghanistan following the fall of the Taliban and the first Hindi film in the country since Khuda Gawah (1992). The production coincided with a rise in Taliban activity, and the crew received death threats from insurgents. The Afghan government responded by assigning 60 armed commandos to protect the unit during the shoot.

== Reception ==
=== Box office ===
Kabul Express opened to a positive response at multiplexes. According to Box Office India, the film grossed approximately ₹12.25 crore (US$1.4 million) in India, making it a moderate commercial success.

== Soundtrack ==
Kabul Express

Soundtrack album by Raghav Sachar
- Released: 17 November 2006
- Recorded: YRF Studios; Mumbai, India
- Genre: Film soundtrack
- Length: 34:19
- Label: YRF Music
- Producer: Aditya Chopra

Raghav Sachar chronology
Kabul Express (2006)	Sunday (2008)

The album featuring 9 tracks including three remix and two instrumental. All tracks were composed by Raghav Sachar, one instrumental was composed by Julius Packiam. The lyrics were written by Aditya Dhar.

The film score was composed by Julius Packiam.

Track listing
No.	Title	Singer(s)	Length
1.	"Kabul Fiza"	Raghav Sachar	4:00
2.	"Banjar"	Shubha Mudgal	4:15
3.	"Keh Raha Mera Dil"	Raghav Sachar	4:11
4.	"Yeh Main Aaya Kahaan Hoon"	Raghav Sachar	4:07
5.	"Kabul Fiza" (Remix)	Raghav Sachar	3:24
6.	"Banjar" (Lounge Mix)	Sunidhi Chauhan	4:08
7.	"Banjar" (Revisited)	KK	4:17
8.	"Kabul Express Theme" (Composed By: Julius Packiam)	Instrumental	4:29
9.	"Kabul Fiza Theme"	Instrumental	2:08
Total length:			34:19

=== Critical response ===
==== India ====
In India, Kabul Express received mixed reviews. Taran Adarsh of IndiaFM rated the film 2.5 out of 5 stars, calling it "a well-crafted thriller" and writing that it was "aimed at the elite and the thinking audience," though he noted that the use of English and Afghani languages might limit its reach beyond urban centers. Khalid Mohamed of Hindustan Times gave it 2 out of 5 stars, stating, "You expected far more spleen and substance from this fact-inspired adventure thriller," and criticized its pacing despite praising the editing.

==== International ====
Kabul Express was screened as a Special Presentation at the 2006 Toronto International Film Festival, where it received mixed international reviews. Phelim O'Neill of The Guardian rated it 3 out of 5 stars and noted that while the film's message was handled simplistically, the war-ravaged landscape conveyed a stronger impact than the script. Robert Koehler of Variety described it as "a lame revival of buddy road pics" and felt that it "trivializes global politics," though he acknowledged the international appeal of its casting. Anil Sinanan of Time Out criticized the film's tone and performances, noting that "only the cinematography of a stunningly beautiful landscape ravaged by war" lent it any lasting impression.

== Accolades ==
Award	Date of the ceremony	Category	Recipients	Result	Ref.
Asian Festival of First Films	29 November–6 December 2006	Swarvoski Trophy for Best Director	Kabir Khan	Won	
Asian Festival of First Films	29 November–6 December 2006	Foreign Correspondents Association Purple Orchid Award	Kabul Express	Won	
Filmfare Awards	17 February 2007	Best Background Score	Julius Packiam	Nominated	
National Film Awards	2 September 2008	Best Debut Film of a Director	Kabir Khan	Won	

== Controversy ==
On 6 January 2007, the Government of Afghanistan banned Kabul Express, despite having supported its production and permitted its filming in the country. The ban, issued by the Afghan Ministry of Culture, followed public protests over the film's alleged portrayal of the Hazara community, an ethnic Shia minority that has historically faced persecution under Taliban rule.

In the film, the Hazaras are referred to by characters—including an Afghan crew member and a former Taliban fighter—as "worse than the Taliban," "bandits," "dangerous," and "savages." These characterizations led to widespread criticism from Hazara civil society groups, who described the depictions as offensive and racist. The Ministry cited these concerns in its decision to prohibit the film's screening in Afghanistan.

== See also ==
- List of cultural references to the September 11 attacks
