= Page 3 (film) =

2005 film by Madhur Bhandarkar

- Theatrical release poster
- Directed by: Madhur Bhandarkar; Jay Dev Banerjee
- Screenplay by: Manoj Tyagi; Nina Arora
- Produced by: Bobby Pushkarna; Kavita Pushkarna
- Starring: Konkona Sen Sharma; Atul Kulkarni; Boman Irani
- Cinematography: Madhu Rao
- Edited by: Suresh Pai
- Music by: Songs: Virgin Emi; Shamir Tandon; Background Score: Raju Singh
- Distributed by: Lighthouse Films Pvt. Ltd. Sahara One Motion Pictures
- Release date: 21 January 2005
- Running time: 139 minutes
- Country: India
- Language: Hindi

Page 3 is a 2005 Indian Hindi-language drama film directed by Madhur Bhandarkar and produced by Bobby Pushkarna and Kavita Pushkarna. The film revolves around the Page 3 culture and media in the city of Mumbai. It stars Konkona Sen Sharma, Atul Kulkarni, Sandhya Mridul, Tara Sharma, Anju Mahendru, and Boman Irani. The film won three National Film Awards, including the Golden Lotus Award for Best Film.

== Plot ==
Madhavi Sharma is a young journalist who arrives in Mumbai looking for a job. She is hired by newspaper editor Deepak Suri to report on celebrity news and writing articles for Page 3. Her roommate Pearl Sequiera is an air hostess who seeking to marry a rich man so that she can have a lavish lifestyle. Gayatri Sachdeva, an aspiring actress, also moves into the apartment. Gayatri enters into a relationship with Rohit Kumar, a leading actor and soon becomes pregnant. Rohit, seeking to protect his career, pressures her to seek an abortion. Depressed and shattered, Gayatri attempts suicide, causing a miscarriage. Pearl marries a wealthy old man and moves to the United States, where she lives an extravagant but loveless life. Madhavi plans to expose Rohit by writing an article on his relationship with Gayatri, but her editor blocks the story, and she is forced to apologize to Rohit.

Madhavi discovers that her boyfriend is bisexual when she finds him in bed with her best friend, Abhijeet. She becomes disillusioned with celebrity lifestyle. She requests to be transferred to a different beat and lands on the crime reporting with Vinayak Mane. She accompanies Vinayak as they search the city for crime-related stories. They witness a bomb blast in the city, which charges Madhavi to investigate the story, but is tasked with to covering a high-profile Bollywood party by Deepak. At the party, she meets the ACP officer in charge of the bomb blast she witnessed, insensitively discussing the incident. Madhavi learns that the officer was attending a film shoot while he was on duty, which delayed his reaction to the blast.

Vinayak goes to cover another news story in Nashik, and Madhavi is left to take charge of crime news. She follows a case of missing boys from a rehabilitation home owned by Anjali Thapar, despite numerous searches. The police learn that a group of boys are being held at the Thapar's private bungalow in Mud Island. Despite not having a search warrant and in Vinayak's absence, they conduct a raid, finding that Ramesh Thapar has been molesting children from the rehabilitation home. Ramesh is arrested, and police also find connections to other influential figures involved in the scandal. Madhavi records the events on camera and develops a breaking exposé story. Deepak promises to run the story as the headline article for the next day's news edition. However, during a meeting with Mr. Agarwal, the owner of the newspaper, Deepak learns that the newspaper receives significant revenue and other sponsorship from Ramesh. Fearing major loss to his business, Agarwal declines to publish the story and asks Deepak to fire Madhavi from the company.

After she is fired, Madhavi meets Vinayak and learns that it was Vinayak's informant who had tipped her off about the boys being picked up. Vinayak consoles her, advising her that submitting all the evidence was a mistake. Madhavi also learns that Thapar's wife committed suicide when she learned that Thapar was molesting boys. After great difficulty, Madhavi reluctantly accepts a job handling Page 3 of another publication.

Covering a party for her new employer, she is shocked to see her former roommate Gayathri, still with Rohit, and her ex-boyfriend with Abhijeet. She also meets Charu Mohanty, a predatory filmmaker who molested Gayathri during her audition. He tells her that everything in the world of celebrities, politics and the film industry is false, and that there are no permanent friends or enemies. Madhavi wordlessly nods and leaves the party.

== Cast ==
- Konkona Sen Sharma as Madhavi Sharma
- Atul Kulkarni as Vinayak Mane
- Sandhya Mridul as Pearl Sequeira
- Tara Sharma as Gayatri Sachdeva
- Anju Mahendru as Ritu Bajaj
- Boman Irani as Deepak Suri
- Bikram Saluja as Rohit Kumar
- Nassar Abdullah as Romesh Thapar, Industrialist
- Rehaan Engineer as Abhijeet Patnaik
- Soni Razdan as Anjali Thapar, Romesh's wife
- Kunika Lal as Monaz Modi
- Kurush Deboo as Hiren Sanghvi
- Madan Jain as ACP Uday Yadav
- Bobby Darling as Fashion Designer Zulfi Khan
- Manoj Joshi as Bosco, Chauffeur
- Suhasini Mulay as Pratima Bhave
- Maya Alagh as Pushpa Bhargav
- Upendra Limaye as Inspector Arun Bhonsle
- Dolly Thakore as Vijaya Agarwal, wife of Pramod Agarwal
- Yusuf Hussian as Pramod Agarwal, chairman of Agarwal Publications
- Suchitra Pillai as Fashion Designer Sonal Roy
- Darshan Jariwala as Mr. Tejani
- Navni Parihar as Sheetal Tejani
- Kishen Mulchandani as Page 3 Socialite in guest appearance
- Mukesh Tyagi as Member of Parliament
- Jai Kalra as Tarun Sanyal
- Parmita Katkar as Dancer (in the song Kuwa Maa) in guest appearance
- Gopal K Singh as Gomes, Drug Supplier
- Samir Modi as Page 3 socialite
- Major Bikramjeet Kanwarpal as Page 3 socialite
- Tony Singh as Page 3 socialite
- Madan Joshi as Page 3 socialite
- Sunil Shetty as himself (cameo appearance)
- Palak Shukla as Fauziya Journalist
- Pradeep Velankar as Charu Mohanty, Filmmaker

== Soundtracks ==
Page 3

Soundtrack album by Shamir Tandon
- Released: Standard Edition; 11 September 2004 (Audio Cassette); 24 September 2004 (Audio CD); Complete Edition; October 2004 (Copy Control CD)
- Genre: Feature film soundtrack
- Length: 53:28
- Label: Virgin Records

All songs of this film were composed by Shamir Tandon. The soundtrack album was released on 11 September 2004 and contains 8 tracks in Standard Edition and 12 tracks in Complete Edition. Zubeen Garg and Mahalakshmi Iyer were supposed to sing a song for the film, but, both were opted out because Zubeen had returned to his hometown in Assam from Mumbai to shoot for the film Mon Jaai and also to promote his next Assamese album Jantra.

Page 3 was the only Bollywood film soundtrack album to implement copy protection on compact disc. Most CD and DVD players won't read this disc and won't treat it as a CD-DA; however, it is possible to insert the disc into a personal computer and play the music via. propiretory software, but it can't be ripped the tracks from Copy Control CDs because it includes DRM, making it harder to rip the tracks to computer.

All tracks are written by Sandeep Nath.

Page 3 (Standard Edition)
No.	Title	Singer(s)	Length
1.	"Kitni Ajeeb" (Female Version)	Lata Mangeshkar
2.	"Meri Wajood"	Adnan Sami
3.	"Kuan Ma"	Sapna Awasthi, Blazze
4.	"Yahaan Zindagi"	Shaan, Sagarika, Shabab Sahri
5.	"Filmy Very Filmy"	Amit Kumar, Blazze
6.	"Kitni Ajeeb" (Male Version)	Suresh Wadkar
7.	"Mere Wajood"	Sadhana Sargam
8.	"Kitni Ajeeb" (Sad Version)	Lata Mangeshkar

Note

- Tracks 6 and 8 did not appear in the film.

Page 3 (A Complete Edition)
No.	Title	Singer(s)	Length
1.	"Kitni Ajeeb" (Female Version)	Lata Mangeshkar
2.	"Meri Wajood"	Adnan Sami
3.	"Kuan Ma"	Sapna Awasthi, Blazze
4.	"Yahaan Zindagi"	Shaan, Sagarika, Shabab Sahri
5.	"Filmy Very Filmy"	Amit Kumar, Blazze
6.	"Kitni Ajeeb" (Male Version)	Suresh Wadkar
7.	"Let's Dance" (Club Bolly Radio Mix)	David Bowie
8.	"Jhoot Boliyan" (Dhol Mix)	Shabab Sabri
9.	"Red Blood Women" (Celestrial Bhangra Mix)	Kylie Minogue
10.	"Mere Wajood"	Sadhana Sargam
11.	"Kitni Ajeeb" (Sad Version)	Lata Mangeshkar
12.	"Huzzor-E-Ala" (Bonus Track)	Asha Bhosle, Abhijeet Bhattacharya

Note

- Tracks 6, 10 and 12 did not appear in the film.

== Box office ==
The film opened to average opening but with positive word of mouth and raving reviews, it went on to do good business later and emerged a semi hit.

== Awards ==
2005 National Film Awards (India)

- Golden Lotus Award - Best Film - Bobby Pushkarna and Kavita Pushkarna
- Silver Lotus Award - Best Screenplay - Nina Arora, Manoj Tyagi
- Silver Lotus Award - Best Editing - Suresh Pai

2005 Zee Cine Awards (India)

- Best Female Debut - Konkona Sen Sharma

51st Filmfare Awards:

Won

- Best Screenplay – Nina Arora & Manoj Tyagi

Nominated

- Best Film – Bobby Pushkarna and Kavita Pushkarna
- Best Director – Madhur Bhandarkar
- Best Supporting Actress – Sandhya Mridul
