= Madhur Bhandarkar =

Indian film director and producer

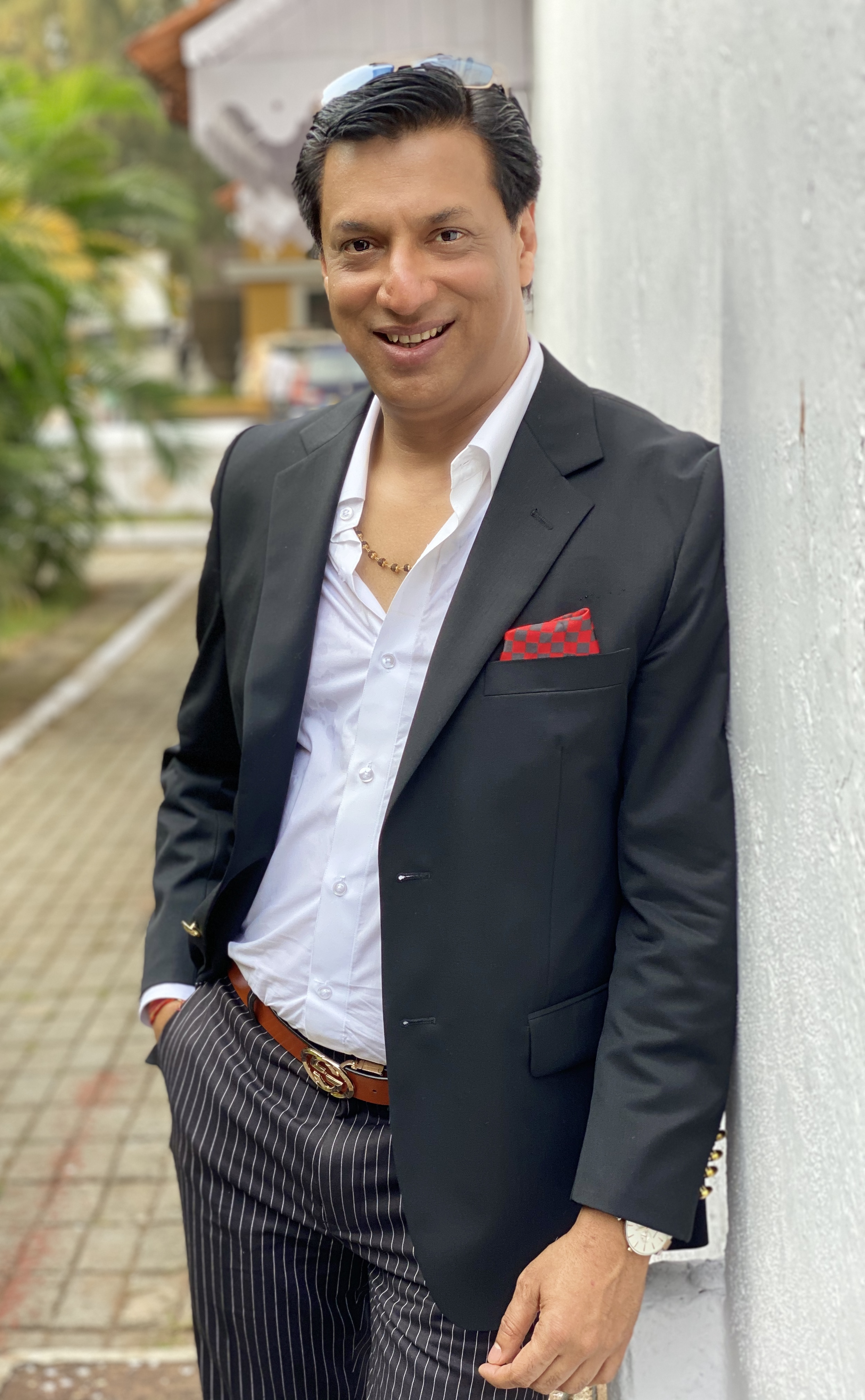
- Bhandarkar in 2013
- Born: 26 August 1968 (age 58); Mumbai, Maharashtra, India
- Occupations: Writer and film maker
- Years active: 1995–present
- Spouse: Renu Namboodiri (m. 2003)
- Children: 1
- Honours: Padma Shri (2016)
- Website: www.madhurbhandarkar.in

Madhur Bhandarkar (born 26 August 1968) is an Indian film director, screenwriter, and producer. In 2016, Bhandarkar was honoured with the Padma Shri, the fourth highest civilian honour, by the Government of India.

He is known for directing the critically acclaimed crime drama Chandni Bar (2001), won him the National Film Award for Best Film on Social Issues, the dramas Page 3 (2005), Traffic Signal (2007), and Fashion (2008), winning the National Film Award for Best Feature Film for the first, and the National Film Award for Best Direction for the second, whilst earning Filmfare Award nominations for Best Director and Best Screenplay for the lattermost.

Bhandarkar also co-produced a Bengali film Avijatrik (2021) based on the novel Aparajito by Bibhutibhushan Bandyopadhyay, which won the National Film Award for Best Feature Film in Bengali. He has also been nominated as society member of the Satyajit Ray Film and Television Institute by the Information and Broadcasting Ministry.

== Career ==
Bhandarkar worked in a video cassette library in Khar, a suburb of Mumbai. This gave him access to a large collection of movies and he studied filmmaking through it.

After trying his skills with small-time filmmakers as an assistant, Bhandarkar landed up as an assistant to Ram Gopal Varma. He even played his first cameo in Varma's romantic comedy Rangeela (1995), where he was the associate director to Varma.

A couple of years later he made his directorial debut with Trishakti (1999) which took more than three years to make. The film had a relatively low key cast and was largely ignored at the box office.

In 2001, he directed the crime drama Chandni Bar starring Tabu and Atul Kulkarni in lead roles. The film depicted the gritty life of the Mumbai underworld, including prostitution, dance bars and gun crime. It received high critical acclaim upon release, and emerged as a commercial success, elevating Bhandarkar into the top league of filmmakers of Bollywood. The film earned him the National Film Award for Best Film on Social Issues.

In 2005, Bhandarkar directed the drama Page 3 starring Konkona Sen Sharma, which revolved around the Page 3 culture and media in the city of Mumbai. Upon release, the film received high critical acclaim and emerged as a commercial success at the box office. It also earned Bhandarkar the National Film Award for Best Feature Film and the Filmfare Award for Best Screenplay, in addition to his first nomination for the Filmfare Award for Best Director.

After helming the corporate drama Corporate (2006) starring Bipasha Basu and Kay Kay Menon, he directed the social drama Traffic Signal (2007) starring Kunal Khemu and Konkona Sen Sharma. The film depicted the lives and travails of people living around a fictitious traffic signal in Mumbai. Upon release, it received high critical acclaim, but emerged as a middling commercial success at the box office. It earned Bhandarkar the National Film Award for Best Direction.

Bhandarkar's next directorial venture, the drama Fashion (2008) starring Priyanka Chopra, Kangana Ranaut and Mugdha Godse in lead roles, emerged as his biggest commercial success to date. The film, which explored feminism and female power in the world of Indian fashion, received widespread critical acclaim upon release. Fashion has widely been regarded as one of the best women-centric films in Bollywood.

He next directed the prison drama Jail (2009), starring Neil Nitin Mukesh and Mugdha Godse, which depicted the lives of wrongful convicts in Indian jails. The film received mixed reviews from critics and emerged as a below average commercial success at the box office.

His next directorial venture, the drama film Heroine (2012), was based on the glamorous world of the Hindi film industry (Bollywood). Initially set to star Aishwarya Rai in the lead role, the film starred Kareena Kapoor as a once successful film actress whose career is on the decline. Upon release, the film received mixed to positive reviews, with Kapoor's performance and Bhandarkar's direction receiving high praise; it also emerged as a commercial success at the box office.

Madhur was conferred PL Deshpande Award a.k.a. Zenith Asia Award for significantly shaping the film making culture in his unique works and he has been described as 'the Film Maker of the First Decade of the 21st Century'. On the Silver Jubilee Year of Aashay Film Club, award ceremony took place on 16 Nov at National Film Archive Theatre during the eighth Pulotsav – An Art Festival in Pune. PL Deshpande was a renowned writer, stage and film actor and his literary works are still revered in Maharashtra and others parts of the world. In his honour, Zenith Asia Award was given to Madhur Bhandarkar and his film Chandni Bar was also screened during the fest amongst landmark 25 films from world cinema.

In Nov, 2010 National Film Archive of India (NFAI) announced to preserve all the films of Madhur Bhandarkar. Chandni Bar, Page 3, Corporate, Traffic Signal, Fashion and Jail found space in Government's Archival data for Indian films.

== Personal life ==
Bhandarkar hails from a Marathi and Konkani speaking Gaud Saraswat Brahmin family. He is a school drop out. He came from a middle class family. As a result, Madhur had to take up various jobs. He worked at a video store as an errand boy and dropped off cassettes to people from many walks of life including dance bar girls and film stars. He also sold chewing gum at traffic signals and worked as an assistant to small time directors for a salary of ₹ 1000.

He is a great devotee of the Hindu God Siddhivinayak and has been walking from his house in Khar, Mumbai to the temple for the past 18 years on every Tuesday. Madhur also regularly visits Vaishno Devi temple in Jammu & Kashmir and the Golden Temple in Amritsar. According to him, the film Corporate (2006) was his most difficult film as people in corporate world would shun him after he bared Page 3 culture in his earlier film. He took inspiration for Corporate from the Coke-Pepsi controversy. He has been invited to deliver lectures on corporate issues to management students after the release of Corporate. (Interview to TV channel IBN Lokmat on 26 November 2008) Bhandarkar married his girlfriend Renu Namboodiri on 15 December 2003 in Mumbai. They have a daughter named Siddhi.

== Directorial style ==
In most of his films, Bhandarkar's protagonist are females. Some examples include Tabu in Chandni Bar, Raveena Tandon in Satta, Konkona Sen Sharma in Page 3, Bipasha Basu in Corporate, Neetu Chandra in Traffic Signal, Priyanka Chopra in Fashion and Kareena Kapoor in Heroine. The exception here being Neil Nitin Mukesh, who was cast as the protagonist in Jail. He has also depicted various gay characters in his films like Page 3, Traffic Signal and Fashion.

In an interview, he said: "My movies are not exposes, maybe they just hold up a mirror to society. My movies are not judgmental; I just show what happens in our society, sometimes there could be a solution and sometimes there may be none. Life goes on.". Madhur is known for his hard hitting and realistic films.

== Filmography ==
Year	Film	Director	Screenwriter	Producer	Notes
1999	Trishakti	Yes	Story	No	
2001	Chandni Bar	Yes	Story	No	Won - National Film Award for Best Film on Other Social Issues
2003	Satta	Yes	Yes	No	
2004	Aan: Men at Work	Yes	No	No	
2005	Page 3	Yes	No	No	Won - National Film Award for Best Feature Film; Nominated – Filmfare Award for Best Director
2006	Corporate	Yes	Story	No	
2007	Traffic Signal	Yes	Yes	Yes	Won - National Film Award for Best Director
2008	Fashion	Yes	Yes	Yes	Nominated – Filmfare Award for Best Director; Nominated – Filmfare Award for Best Screenplay; Nominated – Screen Award for Best Story; Nominated – IIFA Award for Best Director; Nominated – IIFA Award for Best Story; Nominated – Stardust Award for Best Film; Nominated – Stardust Award for Best Director
2009	Specials @ 10	Yes	No	No	Television series
2009	Jail	Yes	Yes	Yes	
2011	Dil Toh Baccha Hai Ji	Yes	Yes	Yes	
2012	Heroine	Yes	Yes	Yes	
2015	Calendar Girls	Yes	Yes	Yes	
2017	Indu Sarkar	Yes	Yes	Yes	Oslo Film Festival Award for Best Director
2021	Avijatrik	No	No	Yes	Bengali film
2022	India Lockdown	Yes	No	Yes	Released on ZEE5
2022	Babli Bouncer	Yes	Yes	No	Released on Disney+ Hotstar
2023	Circuitt	No	No	Yes	Marathi film

== Awards ==
- 2016: Padma Shri, the fourth highest civilian award, by the Government of India.
- National Film Awards
  - 2007: Best Direction: Traffic Signal
- Sophia Awards at Syracuse International Film Festival 2014.
- Conferred with the prestigious British honour – the Creative Spirit and Visionary Director's Award for 2013 – 14 – at the House of Commons, London, UK
- State of Maharashtra conferred Bhandarkar with the Raj Kapoor Smriti Award for contribution to Indian cinema.
