= Linda Arsenio =

American actress and model

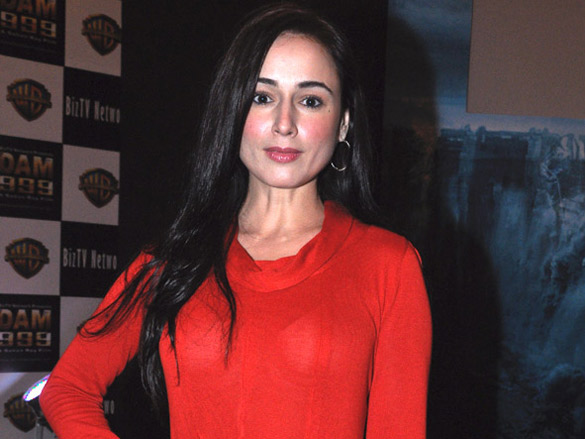
- Linda Arsenio
- Born: June 20, 1978 (age 48); Galveston Island, Texas, U.S.
- Other name: Linda
- Occupations: Actress, model
- Years active: 2001–present

Linda Arsenio is an American actress and model, who has predominantly appeared in Indian films and is best known for her role in the 2006 Hindi film Kabul Express.

== Early life ==
Arsenio was born on Galveston Island, Texas, the daughter of a Salvadoran mother and a Yugoslavian father.

== Career ==
She made her acting début in a British independent film, called The Process of Creative Deception, before stepping into the Hindi film industry. She has acted in Tamil and Telugu films mostly as an item number in films such as Sachein, Bhadra, Kana Kandaen, and Thotti Jaya.

Her first Hindi film is Kabul Express. This movie was entirely shot in Afghanistan. She also appeared in other movies Mumbai Salsa, and Aloo Chaat.

In early 2007, she had acted in two cross-cultural Tamil telefilms, titled My Dear Father (En Iniya Thanthai) and Self Defence (Aththu Meera Aasai), both directed by 'Atlanta' Ganesh.

In 2009, she acted in the Malayalam film Pazhassi Raja alongside popular South Indian actors Mammootty and Sarath Kumar. However, she received much criticism for her role in the film (as Malabar District Sub-Collector's young wife Dora Baber).

== Filmography ==
Year	Film	Role	Language	Notes
2001	The Process of Creative Deception	Randy Kyle	English	
2004	Avenue X	Bar Fly # 1	American Sign Language	Short film
2005	Sachein	Peter Akka	Tamil	Special appearance in the song "Vaadi Vaadi"
2005	Bhadra		Telugu	Special appearance in the song "Yeh Oore Chinadana"
2005	Kana Kandaen		Tamil	Special appearance in the song "Chinna Ponnu"
2005	Thotti Jaya		Tamil	Special appearance in the song "Yaari Singari"
2006	Kabul Express	Jessica Beckham	Hindi	
2007	My Dear Father	Jennifer	English; Tamil	Telefilm; Tamil title: En Iniya Thanthai
2007	Self Defence	Melissa Johnson	English; Tamil	Telefilm; Tamil title: Aththu Meera Aasai
2007	Mumbai Salsa	Pamela Nicole Adamsmith	Hindi	credited as Linda
2009	Aloo Chaat	Nikki	Hindi	
2009	Pazhassi Raja	Dora Baber	Malayalam	
2010	Kedi	Nadia	Telugu	
2010	Help	Natasha	Hindi	
2011	Dam 999	Sandra	English	Indian English movie
2021	Puzhayamma	Roza Linda	Malayalam	
