= Godha (film) =

- Theatrical release poster
- Directed by: Basil Joseph
- Written by: Rakesh Mantodi
- Produced by: Anoop; Mukesh R. Mehta; C. V. Sarathi
- Starring: Tovino Thomas; Wamiqa; Renji Panicker
- Narrated by: Vineeth Sreenivasan
- Cinematography: Vishnu Sarma
- Edited by: Abhinav Sunder Nayak
- Music by: Shaan Rahman
- Production companies: AVA Productions; E4 Entertainment
- Distributed by: E4 Entertainment
- Release date: 19 May 2017
- Running time: 120 minutes
- Country: India
- Language: Malayalam
- Box office: ₹20 crore

Godha (transl. Arena) is a 2017 Indian Malayalam-language sports comedy film directed by Basil Joseph and written by Rakesh Mantodi, and jointly produced by AVA Productions and E4 Entertainment. The film stars Tovino Thomas, Wamiqa Gabbi, Aju Varghese and Renji Panicker. The plot follows Aanjaneya Das, son of Captain Bharathan a gatta gusthi coach, who brings home Aditi Singh, a Punjabi wrestler. Godha was released on 19 May 2017.

== Plot ==
In Punjab, Aditi Singh is a Punjab University wrestling champion. Her late father had encouraged her to take up wrestling from a young age but her older brother restricts her, sometimes through violent means.

In a small village in Kerala, gatta gusthi wrestling used to be a passion for the old generations but the younger generation has moved on to cricket. They frequently clash over Manayathuvayal, a large field where wrestling competitions used to happen years earlier. Aanjaneya Das is one of the youth of the village that play cricket and is generally aimless in life. Captain, who used to be the wrestling champion of the village and his father, sends him to Punjab University against his wishes to enroll him in Master's. There he meets and befriends Aditi and he falls in love with her.

However, her brother fixes her marriage against her wishes and while he takes her home by force, Das interferes and assaults her brother who is a Punjab police officer. Upon Aditi's insistence, he returns to Kerala temporarily until things cool off. But a few days later, he gets a call from Aditi informing him that she ran away to escape from marriage and has landed in his village.

Das lodges her in his home without his parents' knowledge but news soon spreads to his family and later, the village. They reluctantly let her stay there while Das' friends try to woo her. During a temple festival, Aditi takes down two drunkards who misbehave with her. Impressed by her wrestling moves, Captain decides to train her at his gym while Das' friends leave cricket and take up wrestling to get closer to her which irritates Das.

During training, Captain pushes her to work hard and enroll in national wrestling championships while Aditi's mingling and friendship with Das' friends enrages him. One night, he scolds Aditi for her behavior while she reminds him that he has no right to control her actions. Hurt, he proposes her but they are overheard by Captain. Captain tells Das that she aims to become a wrestling champion and encourages him to find his own aim in order to become her equal. A flashback shows that Das was a junior wrestling champion under his father's tutelage but he quit due to his strict and tough training which soured their relationship ever since.

Das realizes that his aim and desire was always to be a wrestling champion and vows to be one, no matter what hardships he faces. He joins his dad's gym while Aditi trains to represent Kerala in National Games. During National Games, the officials inform them that Aditi is ineligible as she is from Punjab. Hurt, she sees her nemesis, Pinto, winning gold. After the match, they exchange heated words and Aditi challenges her to a wrestling competition in Manayathuvayal which she accepts.

The entire village prepares for the competition and the young generation takes initiative in preparing Manayathuvayal for the same. Aditi's brother tracks her to the village and reaches the venue as the competition starts. After fighting hard, Aditi wins the competition earning her brother's approval and inspiring Das while the entire village celebrates her victory and later on, Das goes onto participate in the 5th Asian Indoor Games representing India along with Captain and Aditi by his side.

== Cast ==
- Tovino Thomas as Aanjaneya Das. B
- Wamiqa as Adithi Singh
- Renji Panicker as Captain Bharathan, Aanjaneya Das's Father
- Aju Varghese as Balan aka Balettan
- Hareesh Peradi as Ravi, Bharathan's best friend
- Mamukoya as Pokkarikka
- Sreejith Ravi as Vijayan
- Bijukuttan as Kolamachan
- Hareesh Kanaran as Chellappan
- Dharmajan Bolgatty as Danger
- Pradeep Kottayam as Janappan, Captain Bharathan 's brother and their cook
- Bala Saravanan as Pandi/Muthu Pandiyan
- Parvathi T as Nandana, Aanjaneya Das's mother
- Shine Tom Chacko as Kidilan Firoz (Guest Appearance)
- Basil Joseph as a Manoj, a villager
- Lukman Avaran as Jabir
- Dinesh Nair
- Gokulan
- Gawrie Sankarie as Appu, Aanjaneya Das's sister
- Vineeth Sharma as Aditi's brother
- Jithan V Soubhagom as Youthism Club Member
- Tansen Paul as Aditi's father
- Monisha Sabu as Aditi's friend
- Aarushi Vedikha as Pinto Fernandez

== Production ==
Basil Joseph announced 'Godha' as his next movie, with Tovino Thomas and Punjabi actress Wamiqa Gabbi through his Facebook page on March 5, 2016.

=== Filming ===
Principal photography of the film began in October 2016. Wamiqa Gabbi sustained a lot of injuries in the making of the film. For the film, the actors underwent rigorous training in wrestling. The movie was shot in Chandigarh, Patiala, Ludhiana, Ottapalam and Pazhani. The shooting was completed by December 2016.

== Reception ==
=== Critical response ===
Film critic Veeyen lauded the movie and stated that "Basil Joseph's tweaking of the sport movie recipe in ‘Godha’ works wonders and lifts it up straight on to a prized zone occupied by some of its triumphant predecessors. Strikingly directed and deftly written, ‘Godha’ steps up the rules of the game and wins the combat in a superb take-down."

Amrutha Menon P of Manorama Online praised Adithi's charisma, and described the film as "a simple sports story that will not disappoint you".

Baradwaj Rangan of Film Companion South wrote "Godha may not be as prickly as Dangal, and crises may get resolved a tad too conveniently, but it shares with that film an unwavering eye on what's really the story, what's important...this is a moving, forceful testament to the assimilations that make our country what it is."

=== Box office ===
The film grossed ₹16 crore in 11 days from worldwide box office of which ₹6.41 crore from UAE and GCC box office (first weekend). The film collected $297,800 in its four weekends from UAE box office and $3,647 in its first weekend from UK box office. The film grossed more than ₹20 crore from worldwide box office.

== Soundtrack ==
Godha

Soundtrack album by Shaan Rahman
- Released: 28 April 2017
- Recorded: 2016–2017
- Studio: Shaanz Eternal Ray, Kochi
- Genre: Feature film soundtrack
- Length: 33:09
- Language: Malayalam
- Label: Satyam Audios
- Producer: Shaan Rahman

Shaan Rahman chronology
Take Off (2017)	Godha (2017)	Puthan Panam (2017)
External audio
- Audio Jukebox on YouTube

All lyrics are written by Manu Manjith except where noted; all music is composed by Shaan Rahman.

No.	Title	Lyrics	Artist(s)	Length
1.	"Aaro Nenjil"		Gowry Lekshmi	4:28
2.	"Aaro Nenjil" (Desi Mix)		Gowry Lekshmi	4:10
3.	"Captain's Honor" (Humming)		Radhika Sethumadhavan	2:16
4.	"Innalekalil"		Niranj Suresh	3:13
5.	"Innalekalil" (Treadmill Mix)		Niranj Suresh	3:23
6.	"Kannanjunnoru"		Shaan Rahman	1:57
7.	"Kannethaa Dooratholam"		Sachin Warrier	4:03
8.	"Manayathu Vayalum"		Vineeth Sreenivasan	1:46
9.	"Oh Rabba"	Vinayak Sasikumar	Zia Ul Haq	3:03
10.	"Naadanunarune"		Shaan Rahman	2:39
11.	"Ponnin Kanikkonna" (Wow Song)		Sithara Krishnakumar	4:03
