= Kadaksham =

- Directed by: Sasi Paravoor
- Produced by: A.V. Anoop
- Starring: Suresh Gopi; Shweta Menon
- Cinematography: Ramachandra Babu
- Music by: M. Jayachandran
- Release date: 26 March 2010
- Country: India
- Language: Malayalam

Kadaksham is a 2010 Malayalam film directed by Sasi Paravoor, starring Suresh Gopi, Shwetha Menon and Shwetha Vijay.

== Plot ==
Kadaksham is a women-oriented movie that tells the story of how women must survive against all odds, in a society that still has a conservative outlook.

== Cast ==
- Shwetha Vijay
- Suresh Gopi
- Shweta Menon
- Vijaya Raghavan
- Jagathy Sreekumar
- Indrans
- Manasa Radhakrishnan Malu(child artist)
- Jijoy Rajagopal
- Sreedhanya as Nirmala
- Madhupal as Padmanabhan Thampi

== Soundtrack ==
- "Prananathan" - K. S. Chithra
- "Omanapennallayo" - Sharreth
- "Parayathevayya" - M. Jayachandra
- "Khalchowdvi" - Fiaz Khan
