= Page 3 culture =

Term about tabloid culture in India

Page 3 culture is the name given to tabloid culture in India covering India's partying, high society or upper class, and metropolitan culture, specifically Mumbai's, Delhi's and Bengaluru's, which are all a feature of page three tabloid newspapers.

== Description ==
The term originates from India's colourful daily newspaper supplements appearing usually on the third page that document parties. Page 3 features colour photo spreads of celebrities and the nouveau riche at parties. Those featured on page 3 often include fashion designers, socialites, models, remix music divas and the glamorous and rich.

Page 3 has become a phenomenon which arose from sensationalism.

== In popular culture ==
The "Page 3" culture has been the theme of a Hindi film by Madhur Bhandarkar, Page 3 (2005), which won the National Film Award for Best Feature Film amongst other awards.
