= Vishvaguru =

Sanskrit phrase

Vishvaguru (Sanskrit: विश्वगुरु, romanized: Viśvaguru) or Vishwaguru is a Sanskrit phrase and idea which translates to world or global teacher, world guru, tutors of the world, world leader, or teacher to the world or universe. (Note: Vishwa Hindu Parishad is translated as Universal Hindu Council)

== Translation ==
Viśvaguru (Sanskrit: विश्व गुरु) consists of two words: vishva (transl. 'to pervade' – transl. 'universe') and guru (lit. transl. 'teacher').

== Contemporary references ==
In 1999, Rajendra Singh, the fourth Sarsanghchalak, or leader, of the Hindu nationalist volunteer organisation, Rashtriya Swayamsevak Sangh (RSS), wrote "people have to forego and limit their personal pleasure and work for the realisation of the dream of making Bharat the Vishwaguru again. Great men such as Swami Vivekananda, Savarkar, Hedgewar, Subhas Chandra Bose, Aurobindo Ghose, saw this dream and did wonderful work towards its realisation." The phrase has also been used by the sixth RSS head Mohan Bhagwat.

The word has been used during the premiership of Narendra Modi as a political catchphrase, as a long-term strategy, and to remind Indians of past glory. The Vice-President of India, M. Venkaiah Naidu, used the phrase with reference the India's National Education Policy of 2020. M.S. Swaminathan, widely known as the Father of the Green Revolution in India, has been called a "Vishwa Guru in Agriculture, a teacher and a scholar who continues to leave his inspirational, ideational thought prints on the world" by Naidu.

Shivshankar Menon, India's fourth National Security Advisor, has commented on the usage of the phrase under Modi, saying that India is not now, or anywhere near, being a net exporter of knowledge and ideas. On a more practical level, Menon says that it is not clear "how vishwaguru status would address the immediate problems of livelihood and security that the Indian people and nation face".

== See also ==
- Vishvamitra
- Hindu mythology
