= 7th IIFA Awards =

2006 Indian film awards

- The official logo of the 2006 IIFA Awards
- Date: 15 June 2006– 17 June 2006
- Site: Dubai International Convention Centre; Dubai, UAE
- Hosted by: Fardeen Khan; Lara Dutta

Highlights
- Best Picture: Black
- Best Direction: Sanjay Leela Bhansali (Black)
- Best Actor: Amitabh Bachchan (Black)
- Best Actress: Rani Mukerji (Black)
- Most awards: Black (9)
- Most nominations: Parineeta (17)

Television coverage
- Channel: Star Plus
- Network: STAR TV

The 2006 IIFA Awards, officially known as the 7th International Indian Film Academy Awards ceremony, presented by the International Indian Film Academy honoured the best films of 2005 and took place between 15 and 17 June 2006.

The official ceremony took place on 17 June 2006, at the Dubai International Convention Centre, in Dubai, UAE. During the ceremony, IIFA Awards were awarded in 29 competitive categories. The ceremony was televised in India and internationally on Star Plus. Actors Fardeen Khan and Lara Dutta co-hosted the ceremony. Fardeen had also co-hosted the 2005 IIFA awards while Lara had hosted the 2002 awards

The weekend began with the IIFA Inaugural Press Conference. This was followed by the IIFA World Premiere of Jagmohan Mundra's 'Provoked'. The world premiere also featured south Indian films viz., Chandramukhi, Kannathil Muthamittal, Nayakan, Pokiri, Autograph, Anniyan and Ayutha Ezhuthu. A unique IIFA Foundation Fashion Extravaganza was also hosted to raise funds for the IIFA Foundation.

Parineeta led the ceremony with 11 nominations, followed by Black with 7 nominations, Bunty Aur Babli with 6 nominations, and Iqbal with 5 nominations.

Black won 9 awards, including Best Film, Best Director (for Sanjay Leela Bhansali), Best Actor (for Amitabh Bachchan), Best Actress (for Rani Mukherji) and Best Supporting Actress (for Ayesha Kapur), thus becoming the most-awarded film at the ceremony.

Other multiple awards winners included Parineeta with 6 awards, Bunty Aur Babli with 4 awards and Aashiq Banaya Aapne, Apaharan and Dus receiving 2 awards each. In addition movies receiving a single award included, Sarkar for (Best Supporting Actor), Salaam Namaste for (Best Comedian), Hazaaron Khwaishein Aisi for (Best Male Debut) and Iqbal for (Best Story).

Saif Ali Khan received dual nominations for Best Actor for his performances in Parineeta and Salaam Namaste, but lost to Amitabh Bachchan, who himself received dual nominations in the category for his performances in Black and Sarkar, winning for the former.

Rani Mukherji received dual nominations for Best Actress for her performances in Black and Bunty Aur Babli, winning for the former,

== Background ==
The awards began in 2000 and the first ceremony was held in London at The Millennium Dome. From then on, the awards were held at locations around the world signifying the international success of Bollywood. The next award ceremony was announced to be held in Sheffield, England in 2007.

== Winners and nominees ==
Winners are listed first and highlighted in boldface.

=== Popular awards ===
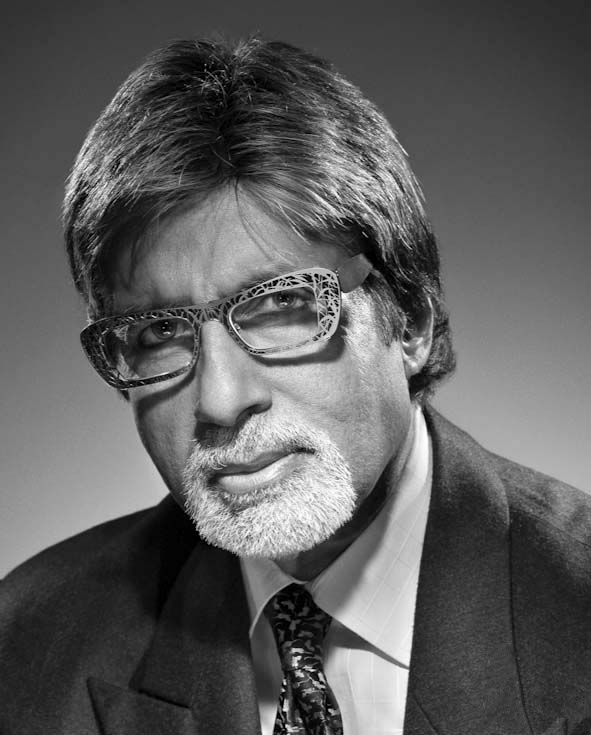
Amitabh Bachchan (Best Actor)

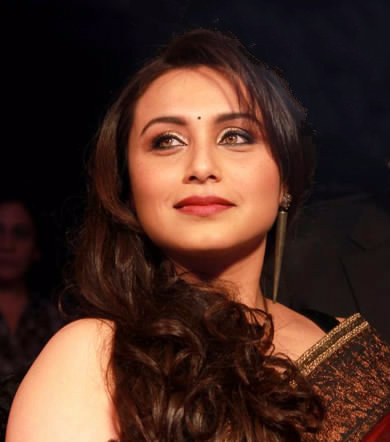
Rani Mukerji (Best Actress)

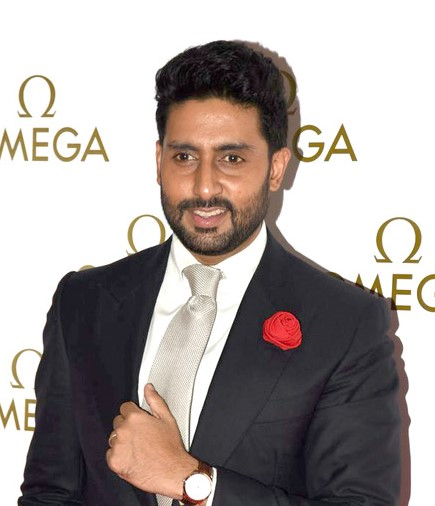
Abhishek Bachchan (Best Supporting Actor)

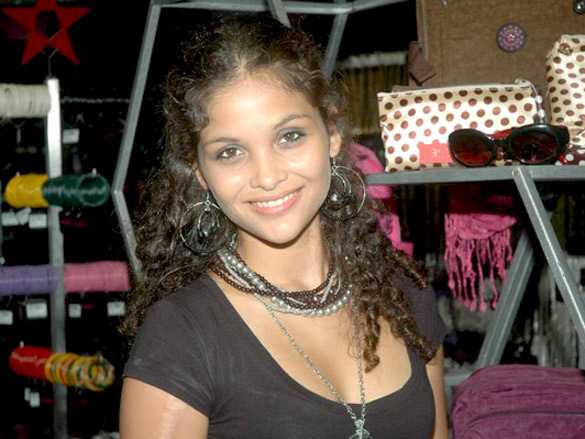
Ayesha Kapur (Best Supporting Actress)

Best Picture	Best Director
**Black – Applause Entertainment**; Bunty Aur Babli – Yash Raj Films; Iqbal – Mukta Arts; No Entry – Sahara One and S K Films Enterprises; Page 3 – Sahara One and Light House Films Pvt. Ltd.; Parineeta – Vinod Chopra Productions	**Sanjay Leela Bhansali – Black**; Madhur Bhandarkar – Page 3; Nagesh Kukunoor – Iqbal; Pradeep Sarkar – Parineeta; Prakash Jha – Apaharan
Best Performance In A Leading Role Male	Best Performance In A Leading Role Female
**Amitabh Bachchan – Black as Debraj Sahai**; Amitabh Bachchan – Sarkar as Subhash Nagre (Sarkar); Saif Ali Khan – Parineeta as Shekhar Rai; Saif Ali Khan – Salaam Namaste as Nikhil "Nick" Arora; Shah Rukh Khan – Paheli as Kishanlal/The Ghost as Prem	**Rani Mukerji – Black as Michelle McNally**; Konkona Sen Sharma – Page 3 as Madhvi Sharma; Rani Mukerji – Bunty Aur Babli as Vimmi Saluja / Babli; Preity Zinta – Salaam Namaste as Ambar "Amby" Malhotra / Hambar; Vidya Balan – Parineeta as Lalita
Best Performance In A Supporting Role Male	Best Performance In A Supporting Role Female
**Abhishek Bachchan – Sarkar as Shankar Nagre**; Amitabh Bachchan – Bunty Aur Babli as Dashrath Singh; John Abraham – Garam Masala as Shyam "Sam"; Naseeruddin Shah – Iqbal as Mohit; Sanjay Dutt – Parineeta as Girish	**Ayesha Kapur – Black as Young Michelle McNally**; Juhi Chawla – My Brother...Nikhil as Anamika; Lara Dutta – No Entry as Kaajal (Kishan's wife); Shernaz Patel – Black as Catherine McNally; Shweta Prasad – Iqbal as Khadija
Best Performance In A Comic Role	Best Performance In A Negative Role
**Javed Jaffrey – Salaam Namaste as Jaggu Yadav aka Crocodile Dundee**; Akshay Kumar – Garam Masala as Makrand 'Mac' Godpure; Boman Irani – Waqt: The Race Against Time as Nattu, Pooja's father; Eesha Koppikhar – Kyaa Kool Hai Hum as Sub-Inspector Urmila Martodkar; Ritesh Deshmukh – Bluffmaster! as Aditya Srivastav aka Dittu	**Nana Patekar – Apaharan as Tabrez Alam**; Ajay Devgn – Kaal as Kaali Pratap Singh; Amrita Singh – Kalyug as Simi Roy; Nana Patekar – Bluffmaster! as Chandrakant Parekh aka Chandru; Pankaj Kapoor – Dus as Himmat Mehendi/Jamwaal
Male Debutant Star	Female Debutant Star
**Shiney Ahuja – Hazaaron Khwaishein Aisi as Vikram Malhotra**	**Vidya Balan – Parineeta as Lalita**

=== Musical awards ===
Best Music Director	Best Lyrics
**Shankar–Ehsaan–Loy – Bunty Aur Babli**; Himesh Reshammiya – Aashiq Banaya Aapne; Shantanu Moitra – Parineeta; Vishal–Shekhar – Bluffmaster!; Vishal–Shekhar – Dus	**"Kajra Re" from Bunty Aur Babli – Gulzar**; "Naam Ada Likhna" from Yahaan – Gulzar; "Piya Bole" from Parineeta – Swanand Kirkire; "Dheere Jalna" from Paheli – Gulzar; "Aashiq Banaya Apne" from Aashiq Banaya Apne – Sameer
Best Male Playback Singer	Best Female Playback Singer
**Himesh Reshammiya for "Aashiq Banaya Apne" – Aashiq Banaya Apne**; Atif Aslam for "Woh Lamhe" – Zeher; Rahat Fateh Ali Khan for "Jiya Dhadak" – Kalyug; Shaan and KK for "Dus Bahane" – Dus; Sonu Nigam for "Piya Bole" – Parineeta	**Alisha Chinai for "Kajra Re" – Bunty Aur Babli**; Kavita Krishnamurthy for "Main Vaari Vaari" – Mangal Pandey: The Rising; Shreya Ghoshal for "Piya Bole" – Parineeta; Sunidhi Chauhan for "Deedar De" – Dus; Sunidhi Chauhan for "Kaisi Paheli" – Parineeta
Best Song Recording	Best Background score
**Parineeta – Bishwadeep Chatterjee**	**Black – Monty Sharma**

=== Backstage awards ===
Best Story	Best Screenplay
**Iqbal – Nagesh Kukunoor**; Page 3 – Madhur Bhandarkar; Black – Sanjay Leela Bhansali; Hazaaron Khwaishein Aisi – Sudhir Mishra; Parineeta – Pradeep Sarkar and Vidhu Vinod Chopra	**Parineeta – Pradeep Sarkar and Vidhu Vinod Chopra**
Best Dialogue
**Prakash Jha for Apaharan**

=== Technical awards ===
Best Art Direction	Best Action
**Parineeta – Keshto Mondol and Elridge Rodrigues**	**Dus – Allan Amin**
Best Cinematographer	Best Choreography
**Black – Ravi K. Chandran**	**Kajra Re from Bunty Aur Babli – Vaibhavi Merchant**
Best Costume Design	Best Editing
**Parineeta – Subarna Ray Chaudhari**	**Black – Bela Segal**
Best Makeup	Best Sound Recording
**Parineeta – Vidyadhar Bhatte**	**Black – Anup Dev**
Best Sound Re-Recording	Best Special Effects
**Aashiq Banaya Aapne – P. Balaraman**	**Dus – Prime Focus Group**

=== Special awards ===
==== Most Glamorous Star of the Year ====
- Preity Zinta

==== Outstanding Achievement In Indian Cinema ====
- Asha Parekh

== Superlatives ==
Films with multiple nominations
Nominations	Film
11	Parineeta
7	Black
6	Bunty Aur Babli
5	Iqbal
4	Dus
4	Page 3
3	Aashiq Banaya Aapne
3	Bluffmaster!
3	Salaam Namaste
2	Apaharan
2	Garam Masala
2	Kalyug
2	No Entry
2	Paheli
2	Sarkar

Films with multiple awards
Awards	Film
9	Black
6	Parineeta
4	Bunty Aur Babli
2	Aashiq Banaya Aapne
2	Apaharan
2	Dus
