= List of accolades received by Black (2005 film) =

Black awards and nominations
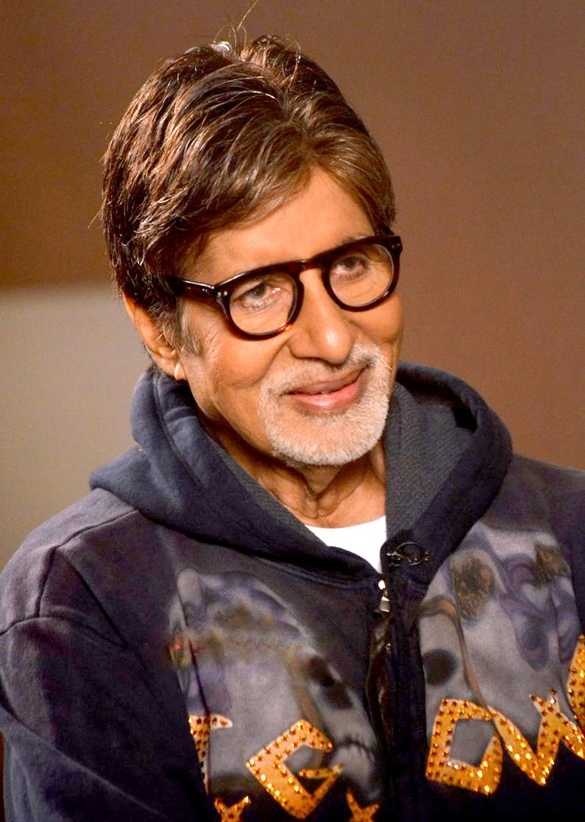
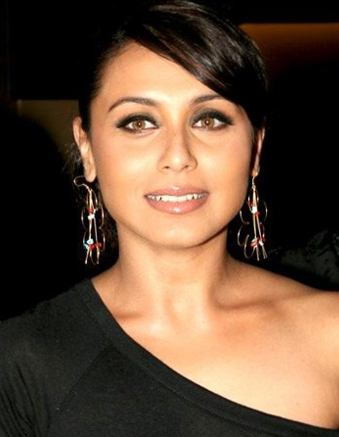
- Amitabh Bachchan and Rani Mukerji garnered several accolades for their roles
Awards and nominations
Award	Wins	Nominations
Anandalok Puraskar	2	2
Bollywood Movie Awards	5	10
Filmfare Awards	11	11
International Indian Film Academy Awards	9	11
National Film Awards	3	3
Producers Guild Film Awards	11	13
Screen Awards	10	13
Stardust Awards	6	6
Zee Cine Awards	10	15

Totals (Note: Certain award groups do not simply award one winner. They acknowledge several different recipients, have runners-up, and have third place. Since this is a specific recognition and is different from losing an award, runner-up mentions are considered wins in this award tally. For simplification and to avoid errors, each award in this list has been presumed to have had a prior nomination.)
- Wins: 68
- Nominations: 85

Black is a 2005 Indian English- and Hindi-language drama film directed by Sanjay Leela Bhansali. It stars Amitabh Bachchan and Rani Mukerji, with Shernaz Patel and Dhritiman Chatterjee playing supporting roles. The film tells the story of Michelle McNally (Mukerji), a young woman who becomes deaf and blind after recovering from an illness when she was an infant, and follows her meeting with an elderly alcoholic teacher, Debraj Sahai (Bachchan). Bhansali, who wrote the story, co-produced Black under SLB Films with Anshuman Swami of Applause Entertainment and co-wrote the screenplay with Bhavani Iyer and Prakash Kapadia. The soundtrack was composed by Monty Sharma, with lyrics from Prasoon Joshi. It was shot by Ravi K. Chandran on sets built by Omung Kumar, while the editing was done by Bela Sehgal.

Made on a budget of between ₹200 million (US$2.1 million) and ₹220 million (US$2.3 million), the film opened on 4 February 2005 and received positive feedback from critics, who mostly praised the leading cast's performances. Black was declared a moderate success with a total gross of ₹409.4 million (US$4.3 million), but ranked among the highest-grossing Indian films of the year. The film won 67 awards out of 84 nominations; the direction, performances of the entire cast, art direction, and background score garnered the most attention from various award groups.

Black won three trophies at the 53rd National Film Awards, including Best Feature Film in Hindi and Best Actor (Bachchan). The film received eleven awards, including those for Best Film, Best Director (Bhansali), Best Actor (Bachchan), and Best Actress (Mukerji), at the 51st Filmfare Awards. At the 7th IIFA Awards, it was nominated in ten categories and won nine awards, including Best Film, Best Director for Bhansali, Best Actor for Bachchan, and Best Actress for Mukerji. Among other wins, it also received two Anandalok Puraskar, five Bollywood Movie Awards, eleven Producers Guild Film Awards, ten Screen Awards, six Stardust Awards, and ten Zee Cine Awards.

== Awards and nominations ==
List of accolades received by Black
Award	Date of ceremony (Note: The date is linked to the article about the awards held that year, wherever possible)	Category	Recipient(s)	Result	Ref(s)
Anandalok Puraskar	20 December 2005	Best Film – Hindi	Black	Won	
Anandalok Puraskar	20 December 2005	Best Actress – Hindi	Rani Mukerji	Won	
Bollywood Movie Awards	10 June 2006	Best Film	Black	Won	
Bollywood Movie Awards	10 June 2006	Best Director	Sanjay Leela Bhansali	Won	
Bollywood Movie Awards	10 June 2006	Best Actor	Amitabh Bachchan	Won	
Bollywood Movie Awards	10 June 2006	Best Actress	Rani Mukerji	Nominated	
Bollywood Movie Awards	10 June 2006	Best Supporting Actress	Ayesha Kapur	Won	
Bollywood Movie Awards	10 June 2006	Best Costume Designer	Sabyasachi Mukherjee	Nominated	
Bollywood Movie Awards	10 June 2006	Best Editing	Bela Sehgal	Nominated	
Bollywood Movie Awards	10 June 2006	Best Lyricist	Prasoon Joshi	Nominated	
Bollywood Movie Awards	10 June 2006	Best Screenplay	Sanjay Leela Bhansali, Bhavani Iyer, Prakash Kapadia	Nominated	
Bollywood Movie Awards	10 June 2006	Best Art Direction	Omung Kumar	Won	
Filmfare Awards	25 February 2006	Best Film	Black	Won	
Filmfare Awards	25 February 2006	Best Film	Black	Won	
Filmfare Awards	25 February 2006	Best Director	Sanjay Leela Bhansali	Won	
Filmfare Awards	25 February 2006	Best Actor	Amitabh Bachchan	Won	
Filmfare Awards	25 February 2006	Best Actor	Amitabh Bachchan	Won	
Filmfare Awards	25 February 2006	Best Actress	Rani Mukerji	Won	
Filmfare Awards	25 February 2006	Best Actress	Rani Mukerji	Won	
Filmfare Awards	25 February 2006	Best Supporting Actress	Ayesha Kapur	Won	
Filmfare Awards	25 February 2006	Best Background Score	Monty Sharma	Won	
Filmfare Awards	25 February 2006	Best Cinematography	Ravi K. Chandran	Won	
Filmfare Awards	25 February 2006	Best Editing	Bela Sehgal	Won	
International Indian Film Academy Awards	15–17 June 2006	Best Film	Black	Won	
International Indian Film Academy Awards	15–17 June 2006	Best Director	Sanjay Leela Bhansali	Won	
International Indian Film Academy Awards	15–17 June 2006	Best Actor	Amitabh Bachchan	Won	
International Indian Film Academy Awards	15–17 June 2006	Best Actress	Rani Mukerji	Won	
International Indian Film Academy Awards	15–17 June 2006	Best Supporting Actress	Ayesha Kapur	Won	
International Indian Film Academy Awards	15–17 June 2006	Best Supporting Actress	Shernaz Patel	Nominated	
International Indian Film Academy Awards	15–17 June 2006	Best Story	Sanjay Leela Bhansali	Nominated	
International Indian Film Academy Awards	15–17 June 2006	Best Background Score	Monty Sharma	Won	
International Indian Film Academy Awards	15–17 June 2006	Best Cinematography	Ravi K. Chandran	Won	
International Indian Film Academy Awards	15–17 June 2006	Best Editing	Bela Sehgal	Won	
International Indian Film Academy Awards	15–17 June 2006	Best Sound Recording	Anup Dev	Won	
National Film Awards	14 September 2007	Best Feature Film in Hindi	Black	Won	
National Film Awards	14 September 2007	Best Actor	Amitabh Bachchan	Won	
National Film Awards	14 September 2007	Best Costume Design	Sabyasachi Mukherjee	Won	
Producers Guild Film Awards	21 January 2006	Best Film	Black	Won	
Producers Guild Film Awards	21 January 2006	Reliance Customers' Choice Award for Best Film	Black	Won	
Producers Guild Film Awards	21 January 2006	Best Director	Sanjay Leela Bhansali	Won	
Producers Guild Film Awards	21 January 2006	Best Actor in a Leading Role	Amitabh Bachchan	Won	
Producers Guild Film Awards	21 January 2006	Best Actress in a Leading Role	Rani Mukerji	Won	
Producers Guild Film Awards	21 January 2006	Best Actress in a Supporting Role	Ayesha Kapur	Won	
Producers Guild Film Awards	21 January 2006	Best Screenplay	Sanjay Leela Bhansali, Bhavani Iyer, Prakash Kapadia	Won	
Producers Guild Film Awards	21 January 2006	Best Costume Design	Sabyasachi Mukherjee	Nominated	
Producers Guild Film Awards	21 January 2006	Best Cinematography	Ravi K. Chandran	Won	
Producers Guild Film Awards	21 January 2006	Best Editing	Bela Sehgal	Nominated	
Producers Guild Film Awards	21 January 2006	Best Sound Recording	Resul Pookutty	Won	
Producers Guild Film Awards	21 January 2006	Best Re-recording	Anup Dev	Won	
Producers Guild Film Awards	21 January 2006	Best Art Design	Omung Kumar	Won	
Screen Awards	11 January 2006	Best Film	Black	Won	
Screen Awards	11 January 2006	Best Director	Sanjay Leela Bhansali	Won	
Screen Awards	11 January 2006	Best Actor	Amitabh Bachchan	Won	
Screen Awards	11 January 2006	Best Actress	Rani Mukerji	Won	
Screen Awards	11 January 2006	Best Supporting Actress	Shernaz Patel	Nominated	
Screen Awards	11 January 2006	Best Child Artist	Ayesha Kapur	Won	
Screen Awards	11 January 2006	Best Screenplay	Sanjay Leela Bhansali, Bhavani Iyer, Prakash Kapadia	Won	
Screen Awards	11 January 2006	Best Dialogue	Bhavani Iyer, Prakash Kapadia	Nominated	
Screen Awards	11 January 2006	Best Cinematography	Ravi K. Chandran	Won	
Screen Awards	11 January 2006	Best Background Score	Monty Sharma	Won	
Screen Awards	11 January 2006	Best Editing	Bela Sehgal	Won	
Screen Awards	11 January 2006	Best Art Direction	Omung Kumar	Nominated	
Screen Awards	11 January 2006	Best Sound Design	Resul Pookutty	Won	
Stardust Awards	20 February 2005	Special Award	Amitabh Bachchan, Sanjay Leela Bhansali	Won	
Stardust Awards	15 January 2006	Hottest Film of the Year	Black	Won	
Stardust Awards	15 January 2006	Best Director of the Year	Sanjay Leela Bhansali	Won	
Stardust Awards	15 January 2006	Actor of the Year – Male	Amitabh Bachchan	Won	
Stardust Awards	15 January 2006	Actor of the Year – Female	Rani Mukerji	Won	
Stardust Awards	15 January 2006	Exciting New Face of the Year	Ayesha Kapur	Won	
Zee Cine Awards	4 March 2006	Best Film	Black	Won	
Zee Cine Awards	4 March 2006	Best Director	Sanjay Leela Bhansali	Won	
Zee Cine Awards	4 March 2006	Best Actor – Male	Amitabh Bachchan	Won	
Zee Cine Awards	4 March 2006	Best Actor – Female	Rani Mukerji	Won	
Zee Cine Awards	4 March 2006	Best Actor in a Supporting Role – Female	Ayesha Kapur	Won	
Zee Cine Awards	4 March 2006	Best Actor in a Supporting Role – Female	Shernaz Patel	Nominated	
Zee Cine Awards	4 March 2006	Best Background Score	Monty Sharma	Won	
Zee Cine Awards	4 March 2006	Best Screenplay	Sanjay Leela Bhansali, Bhavani Iyer, Prakash Kapadia	Nominated	
Zee Cine Awards	4 March 2006	Best Editing	Bela Sehgal	Won	
Zee Cine Awards	4 March 2006	Best Cinematography	Ravi K. Chandran	Won	
Zee Cine Awards	4 March 2006	Best Art Direction	Omung Kumar	Nominated	
Zee Cine Awards	4 March 2006	Best Publicity Design	HR Enterprises	Won	
Zee Cine Awards	4 March 2006	Best Film Processing	Rahul Nanda, Himanshu Nanda	Nominated	
Zee Cine Awards	4 March 2006	Best Audiography	Resul Pookutty	Won	
Zee Cine Awards	4 March 2006	Best Re-recording	Anup Dev	Nominated	
