= List of Hindi films of 2005 =

This is a list of films produced by the Bollywood film industry based in Mumbai in 2005.

== Top-earning films ==
The top 10 highest worldwide grossing Bollywood films of 2005 are as follows:

Highest-grossing Bollywood films of 2005
Rank	Title	Production company	Worldwide gross
1	No Entry	SK Film Entertainment; Sahara One Motion Pictures	₹74,13,50,000 (equivalent to ₹2.7 billion or US$29 million in 2026)
2	Bunty Aur Babli	Yash Raj Films	₹63,74,05,000 (equivalent to ₹2.4 billion or US$25 million in 2026)
3	Salaam Namaste	Yash Raj Films	₹57,23,00,000 (equivalent to ₹2.1 billion or US$22 million in 2026)
4	Garam Masala	Venus Records & Tapes	₹54,65,17,500 (equivalent to ₹2.0 billion or US$21 million in 2026)
5	Mangal Pandey: The Rising	Kaleidoscope Entertainment	₹52,57,85,000 (equivalent to ₹1.9 billion or US$20 million in 2026)
6	Maine Pyaar Kyun Kiya?	Shree Ashtavinayak Cinevision; Sohail Khan Productions	₹47,22,25,000 (equivalent to ₹1.8 billion or US$18 million in 2026)
7	Waqt: The Race Against Time	Eros International Blockbuster Movie Entertainers	₹42,48,62,500 (equivalent to ₹1.6 billion or US$16 million in 2026)
8	Black	Applause Entertainment; Sanjay Leela Bhansali Films	₹40,93,70,000 (equivalent to ₹1.5 billion or US$16 million in 2026)
9	Sarkar	RGV Film Company	₹39,30,47,500 (equivalent to ₹1.5 billion or US$15 million in 2026)
10	Dus	Karma Entertainment	₹38,83,70,000 (equivalent to ₹1.4 billion or US$15 million in 2026)

== Released films ==
=== January–March ===
Opening		Title	Director	Cast	Genre	Studio
J A N	7	Rog	Himanshu Brahmbhatt	Irrfan Khan, Himanshu Malik, Ilene Hamann	Drama, thriller	
J A N	7	Vaada	Satish Kaushik	Arjun Rampal, Ameesha Patel, Zayed Khan	Thriller	
J A N	14	Elaan	Vikram Bhatt	Arjun Rampal, Ameesha Patel, Mithun Chakraborty, John Abraham, Lara Dutta	Action, drama	
J A N	14	Insan	K. Subash	Akshay Kumar, Ajay Devgn, Lara Dutta, Esha Deol, Tusshar Kapoor, Koena Mitra, Rahul Dev	Action, thriller	
J A N	21	Kisna: The Warrior Poet	Subhash Ghai	Vivek Oberoi, Isha Sharvani, Ronit Roy, Amrish Puri, Sushmita Sen, Rajat Kapoor	Drama	
J A N	21	Page 3	Madhur Bhandarkar	Konkona Sen Sharma, Atul Kulkarni, Tara Sharma, Sandhya Mridul	Drama, social	
J A N	28	Blackmail	Anil Devgan	Suniel Shetty, Ajay Devgn, Priyanka Chopra, Dia Mirza	Thriller	Siddhi Vinayak Creations
J A N	28	Padmashree Laloo Prasad Yadav	Mahesh Manjrekar	Sunil Shetty, Mahesh Manjrekar, Kim Sharma, Gulshan Grover, Johnny Lever	Comedy	
F E B	4	Black	Sanjay Leela Bhansali	Amitabh Bachchan, Rani Mukherji, Ayesha Kapur, Shernaz Patel, Nandana Sen, Dhritiman Chaterji	Drama	Applause Entertainment, SLB Films
F E B	4	Bullet: Ek Dhamaka	Irfan Khan	Iqbal Khan, Asseem Merchant, Asad Sikandar, Saadhika	Action	
F E B	4	Shabd	Leena Yadav	Sanjay Dutt, Aishwarya Rai, Zayed Khan	Drama	
F E B	4	Tezaab – The Acid of Love	Shakeel Noorani	Mighty Khan, Parvin Dabas, Shruti Sharma	Erotic	
F E B	11	Chaahat – Ek Nasha	Jai Prakash	Manisha Koirala, Aryan Vaid, Preeti Jhangiani	Romance	
F E B	11	Hum Dum	Kushan Nandy	Anjana Sukhani, Romit Raj, Ranvir Shorey	Romance	
F E B	11	Sheesha	Ashu Trikha	Neha Dhupia, Sonu Sood	Thriller	
F E B	18	Chehraa	Saurabh Shukla	Bipasha Basu, Dino Morea, Preeti Jhangiani, Irrfan Khan	Thriller	
F E B	18	Jurm	Vikram Bhatt	Bobby Deol, Milind Soman, Lara Dutta	Thriller	
F E B	25	Bewafaa	Dharmesh Darshan	Akshay Kumar, Sushmita Sen, Kareena Kapoor, Shamita Shetty, Anil Kapoor, Manoj Bajpai	Drama	
F E B	25	Fun – Can Be Dangerous Sometimes	Sunjay Zaveri	Aryan Vaid, Hina Rehman, Siddharth Koirala, Payal Rohatgi	Erotic drama	
F E B	25	Nigehbaan: The Third Eye	Dilip Shankar	Sameer Dharmadhikari, Sandali Sinha, Sayaji Shinde, Govind Namdev		
M A R	4	Chand Sa Roshan Chehra	Shabah Shamsi	Samir Aftab, Tamanna Bhatia, Talat Aziz, Kiran Kumar	Romance	
M A R	4	Socha Na Tha	Imtiaz Ali	Ayesha Takia, Abhay Deol, Ayesha Jhulka	Romance, comedy	Vijayta Films
M A R	4	Zameer: The Fire Within	Kamal	Ajay Devgn, Ameesha Patel, Mahima Chaudhry	Drama	
M A R	11	Karam	Sanjay F. Gupta	John Abraham, Priyanka Chopra, Murli Sharma, Shiney Ahuja	Thriller	
M A R	18	Classic – Dance of Love	Babbar Subhash	Mithun Chakraborty, Meghna Naidu, Vikas Bhardwaj	Erotic thriller	
M A R	25	My Brother... Nikhil	Onir	Purab Kohli, Juhi Chawla, Sanjay Suri	Drama, social	
M A R	25	Tango Charlie	Mani Shankar	Ajay Devgn, Bobby Deol, Tanisha, Nandana Sen, Sanjay Dutt, Sunil Shetty	War, drama	Neha Arts
M A R	25	Zeher	Mohit Suri	Shamita Shetty, Emraan Hashmi, Udita Goswami	Drama, thriller	

=== April–June ===
Opening		Title	Director	Cast	Genre	Studio
A P R	1	Jackpot	Samit Baadkar	Meghna Naidu, Himanshu Malik	Crime	
A P R	8	Lucky: No Time for Love	Radhika Rao; Vinay Sapru	Salman Khan, Mithun Chakraborty, Sneha Ullal	Romance	
A P R	10	Naam Gum Jaayega	Amol Shetge	Aryan Vaid, Rakesh Bapat, Dia Mirza, Divya Dutta	Romance	
A P R	15	Hazaaron Khwaishein Aisi	Sudhir Mishra	Shiney Ahuja, Chitrangada Singh, Saurabh Shukla, Kay Kay Menon, Ram Kapoor, Gajraj Rao, Arif Zakaria, Yusuf Hussain	Drama	
A P R	15	Khamoshh... Khauff Ki Raat	Deepak Tijori	Shilpa Shetty, Juhi Chawla	Thriller	
A P R	15	Kuchh Meetha Ho Jaye	Samar Khan	Arshad Warsi, Mahima Chaudhry, Shah Rukh Khan, Ashwin Mushran, Parvin Dabas, Sandhya Mridul	Comedy, drama, romance	
A P R	15	Mumbai Xpress	Singeetam Srinivasa Rao	Kamal Haasan, Manisha Koirala, Om Puri, Vijay Raaz	Comedy	
A P R	22	Dreams	Ashish Chanana	Aashish Chanana, Neha Pendse, Arzoo Govitrikar, Manoj Bidwani		
A P R	22	Waqt: The Race Against Time	Vipul Shah	Amitabh Bachchan, Akshay Kumar, Shefali Shah, Priyanka Chopra, Boman Irani, Rajpal Yadav, Asawari Joshi, Rajeev Mehta	Drama	Entertainment One, Eros International
A P R	28	Khullam Khulla Pyaar Karen	Harmesh Malhotra	Govinda, Preity Zinta	Comedy	
A P R	29	Kaal	Soham Shah	Ajay Devgn, John Abraham, Vivek Oberoi, Lara Dutta, Vishal Malhotra, Esha Deol, Shahrukh Khan, Kushal Punjabi, Malaika Arora, Parmeet Sethi	Horror, thriller	Red Chillies Entertainment, Dharma Productions
A P R	29	Revati	Farogh Siddique	Kashmera Shah, Kiran, Ayub Khan, Shreyas Talpade, Alok Nath	Drama	
M A Y	6	Kyaa Kool Hai Hum	Sangeeth Sivan	Tusshar Kapoor, Riteish Deshmukh, Isha Koppikar, Neha Dhupia, Rajpal Yadav, Anupam Kher	Comedy	UTV Motion Pictures, Balaji Motion Pictures
M A Y	6	Main Aisa Hi Hoon	Harry Baweja	Ajay Devgn, Sushmita Sen, Esha Deol	Drama	
M A Y	13	Jo Bole So Nihaal	Rahul Rawail	Sunny Deol, Thomas Tevana, Kamaal Khan, Shillpi Sharma	Action, comedy	
M A Y	20	Naina	Shripal Morakhia	Anuj Sawhney, Urmila Matondkar, Dinesh Lamba	Horror, thriller	
M A Y	20	Shabnam Mausi		Ashutosh Rana	Biographical	
M A Y	27	Bunty Aur Babli	Shaad Ali	Amitabh Bachchan, Abhishek Bachchan, Rani Mukerji, Raj Babbar, Prem Chopra, Kunal Kumar, Tania Zaetta, Pankaj Tripathi	Comedy, crime, romance, musical	Yash Raj Films
J U N	3	D	Ram Gopal Varma	Randeep Hooda, Chunky Pandey, Isha Koppikar	Crime, drama	UTV Motion Pictures, Sahara One Motion Pictures, RGV Film Company, K Sera Sera
J U N	3	Koi Mere Dil Mein Hai	Deepak Ramsay	Priyanshu Chatterjee, Dia Mirza, Rakesh Bapat, Neha	Drama	
J U N	3	Time Pass		Arjun Punj, Sherlyn Chopra		
J U N	10	Parineeta	Pradeep Sarkar	Sanjay Dutt, Saif Ali Khan, Vidya Balan, Dia Mirza, Raima Sen	Drama	UTV Motion Pictures, Vinod Chopra Films
J U N	17	99.9 FM	Sanjay Bhatia	Shawar Ali, Raima Sen, Dipannita Sharma	Crime thriller	
J U N	17	Bachke Rehna Re Baba	Govind Menon	Rekha, Mallika Sherawat, Paresh Rawal, Karan Khanna, Satish Shah	Comedy	
J U N	17	Silsiilay	Khalid Mohamed	Tabu, Bhumika Chawla, Riya Sen, Rahul Bose, Jimmy Shergill, Divya Dutta, Kay Kay Menon, Celina Jaitly, Natassha, Ashmit Patel	Romance	
J U N	17	Ssukh	Kirti Ahuja	Govinda, Preeti Jhangiani	Comedy	
J U N	24	Chetna: The Excitement	Partho Ghosh	Jatin Grewal, Payal Rohatgi, Navneet Kaur	Erotic drama	
J U N	24	Pehchaan: The Face of Truth	Shrabani Deodhar	Vinod Khanna, Raveena Tandon, Rati Agnihotri	Drama	
J U N	24	Paheli	Amol Palekar	Shah Rukh Khan, Rani Mukerji, Anupam Kher, Juhi Chawla, Sunil Shetty, Amitabh Bachchan, Rajpal Yadav, Naseeruddin Shah, Ratna Pathak Shah	Fantasy, romance, musical	Red Chillies Entertainment

=== July–September ===
Opening		Title	Director	Cast	Genre	Studio
J U L	1	Amavas	Sidharth Srinivasan	Konkona Sen Sharma, Victor Banerjee	Drama	
J U L	1	Sarkar	Ram Gopal Varma	Amitabh Bachchan, Abhishek Bachchan, Katrina Kaif, Tanisha	Crime, drama	Sahara One Motion Pictures, RGV Film Company, K Sera Sera
J U L	1	Yakeen	Girish Dhamija	Arjun Rampal, Priyanka Chopra, Anang Desai, Ankur Nayyar, Kim Sharma	Drama	
J U L	8	Dus	Anubhav Sinha	Suniel Shetty, Sanjay Dutt, Shilpa Shetty, Esha Deol, Zayed Khan, Abhishek Bachchan, Javed Sheikh, Dia Mirza, Raima Sen, Gulshan Grover. Pankaj Kapur	Action, thriller	Venky's Rock, Bala Entertainment International, Karma Entertainment Production
J U L	8	Fareb	Deepak Tijori	Shilpa Shetty, Manoj Bajpai, Shamita Shetty	Thriller	
J U L	12	Double Cross - Ek Dhoka	Vicky Tejwani	Sahil Khan, Negar Khan, Ayesha Jhulka		
J U L	15	Maine Pyaar Kyun Kiya?	David Dhawan	Salman Khan, Sushmita Sen, Katrina Kaif, Sohail Khan, Arshad Warsi, Isha Koppikar, Arbaaz Khan, Rajpal Yadav	Comedy	Shree Ashtavinayak Cine Vision, Sohail Khan Productions
J U L	15	Mashooka	Afzal Ahmed	Aditya Bal, Meghna Naidu	Erotic thriller	
J U L	15	Mazaa Mazaa	T. L. V. Prasad	Payal Rohatgi, Farid Amiri, Shivani Singh, Pankaj Beri	Comedy, drama	
J U L	22	Hum Tum Aur Mom	Ashok Nanda	Mohnish Bahl, Sonali Goswami, Mushtaq Khan, Tiku Talsania, Reema Lagoo, Krishna Abhishek	Drama	
J U L	22	Kasak	Rajiv Babbar	Lucky Ali, Meera	Drama	
J U L	22	Viruddh... Family Comes First	Mahesh Manjrekar	Amitabh Bachchan, Sharmila Tagore, Prem Chopra, John Abraham, Anusha Dandekar, Sanjay Dutt, Tanvi Hegde, Tom Alter	Drama	UTV Motion Pictures, AB Corp, Satyajeet Movies
J U L	29	7½ Phere	Ishaan Trvedi	Manoj Pahwa, Juhi Chawla, Irrfan Khan, Chahat Khanna, Anang Desai	Comedy	
J U L	29	Sehar	Kabeer Kaushik	Arshad Warsi, Mahima Chaudhry, Rajendra Gupta, Sushant Singh, Suhasini Mulay, Naved Aslam	Crime, drama	
J U L	29	Yahaan	Shoojit Sircar	Jimmy Shergill, Minissha Lamba	Romance	
A U G	5	Film Star	Tanuja Chandra	Mahima Chaudhry, Priyanshu Chatterjee, Vasundhara Das Anup Shukla	Drama	
A U G	5	White Rainbow	Dharan Mandrayar	Sonali Kulkarni, Amardeep Jha, Shameen Shaikh, Amruta Subhash		
A U G	12	Mangal Pandey: The Rising	Ketan Mehta	Aamir Khan, Rani Mukherji, Ameesha Patel, Murali Sharma	Drama, historical	Kaleidoscope Entertainment
A U G	19	Barsaat	Suneel Darshan	Bobby Deol, Bipasha Basu, Priyanka Chopra, Shakti Kapoor	Drama	
A U G	19	My Wife's Murder	Jijy Philip	Anil Kapoor, Suchitra Krishnamoorthi, Nandana Sen, Boman Irani	Drama, thriller	
A U G	26	Bhagmati	Ashok Kaul	Milind Soman, Mahima Chaudhry, Tabu, Ashok Kaul	Romance	
A U G	26	Iqbal	Nagesh Kukunoor	Shreyas Talpade, Naseeruddin Shah	Sports, drama, social	Mukta Searchlight Films
A U G	26	No Entry	Anees Bazmee	Anil Kapoor, Salman Khan, Fardeen Khan, Bipasha Basu, Lara Dutta, Sameera Reddy, Esha Deol, Celina Jaitly	Comedy	Sahara One Motion Pictures, BSK Network & Entertainment, S.K. Films Enterprises
S E P	2	Aashiq Banaya Aapne	Aditya Datt	Emraan Hashmi, Tanushree Dutta, Navin Nischol, Sonu Sood	Thriller	
S E P	2	Dansh	Kanika Verma	Kay Kay Menon, Sonali Kulkarni	Drama	
S E P	2	Pyaar Mein Twist	Hriday Shetty	Rishi Kapoor, Dimple Kapadia, Vikas Bhalla, Sameer Dattani, Soha Ali Khan	Drama, romance	
S E P	2	Ramji Londonwale	Sanjay Dayma	Madhavan, Samita Bangargi	Comedy, drama	
S E P	9	Jalwa - Fun in Love	Rajiv S. Ruia	Kiran Janjani, Monalisa, Viraaj, Neha Bhatt	Erotic drama	
S E P	9	Salaam Namaste	Siddharth Anand	Saif Ali Khan, Preity Zinta, Abhishek Bachchan, Arshad Warsi, Tania Zaetta, Jugal Hansraj, Javed Jaffrey, Kunal Vijaykar	Romance, comedy, drama, social	Yash Raj Films
S E P	9	Topless		Shweta Menon, Tarun Khanna, Sardar Sohi		
S E P	9	Water	Deepa Mehta	Seema Biswas, Lisa Ray, John Abraham, Sarala Kariyawasam, Manorama	Drama	Fox Searchlight Pictures, B.R. Films, Mongrel Media, Hamilton/Mehta Productions, Telefilm Canada, Noble Nomad Pictures, Echo Lake Entertainment
S E P	16	Chocolate	Vivek Agnihotri	Anil Kapoor, Sunil Shetty, Irrfan Khan, Emraan Hashmi, Arshad Warsi, Tanushree Dutta, Sushama Reddy, Murali Sharma	Action, thriller, suspense	
S E P	16	James	Rohit Jugraj	Mohit Ahlawat, Nisha Kothari, Zakir Hussain, Mohan Agashe, Rajpal Yadav, Riya Sen	Action	
S E P	16	Sau Jhooth Ek Sach	Bappaditya Roy	Mammootty, Vikram Gokhale	Thriller	
S E P	22	Mumbai Godfather	Deepak Balraj Vij	Seema Biswas, Vikram Singh	Drama	
S E P	23	Dil Jo Bhi Kahey...	Romesh Sharma	Amitabh Bachchan, Bhumika Chawla, Karan Sharma, Revathi	Family drama	
S E P	30	Maine Gandhi Ko Nahin Mara	Jahnu Barua	Prem Chopra, Urmila Matondkar, Anupam Kher, Parvin Dabas, Rajit Kapur, Waheeda Rehman	Drama, social	
S E P	30	Sauda - The Deal	Jay Prakash	Aryan Vaid, Preeti Jhangiani		

=== October–December ===
Opening		Title	Director	Cast	Genre	Studio
O C T	7	Main, Meri Patni Aur Woh	Chandan Arora	Rajpal Yadav, Rituparna Sen	Romance, comedy	UTV Motion Pictures, Makefilms
O C T	7	Saathi: The Companion	Faaiz Anwar	Rupa Dutta, Divvij Kak, Anchal Anand, Sameer Ali Khan		
O C T	14	Koi Aap Sa	Partho Mitra	Aftab Shivdasani, Natassha, Himanshu Malik	Drama, romance	
O C T	21	Hanuman	V. G. Samant		Animated	Sahara One Motion Pictures, Percept Picture Company
O C T	21	U, Bomsi n Me	Jairaj Padmanabhan	Gautam Rode, Sonal Sehgal, Vivek Madan, Vidya Malvade	Drama	
N O V	2	Garam Masala	Priyadarshan	Akshay Kumar, John Abraham, Rimi Sen, Neha Dhupia, Paresh Rawal. Rajpal Yadav, Daisy Bopanna, Asrani	Comedy	Venus Records & Tapes
N O V	3	Kyon Ki	Priyadarshan	Salman Khan, Kareena Kapoor, Jackie Shroff, Suniel Shetty	Drama, romance	Orion Pictures, MAD Entertainment
N O V	3	Shaadi No. 1	David Dhawan	Fardeen Khan, Zayed Khan, Sharman Joshi, Esha Deol, Ayesha Takia, Soha Ali Khan, Sanjay Dutt, Rajpal Yadav, Riya Sen, Sophie Choudry, Aarti Chhabria	Comedy, romance	UTV Motion Pictures, Puja Films
N O V	18	Ek Khiladi Ek Haseena	Suparn Verma	Sharad Kapoor, Rakhi Sawant, Fardeen Khan, Feroz Khan, Koena Mitra, Murali Sharma, Kay Kay Menon, Gulshan Grover, Rohit Roy, Mukul Dev, Kurush Deboo	Thriller	
N O V	18	Sitam		Kiran Janjani, Tara Sharma, Navneet Kaur, Avtar Gill, Suhasini Mulay		
N O V	18	Taj Mahal: An Eternal Love Story	Akbar Khan	Arbaaz Khan, Kabir Bedi, Manisha Koirala, Pooja Batra	History, epic, romance	
N O V	25	Deewane Huye Paagal	Vikram Bhatt	Akshay Kumar, Shahid Kapoor, Sunil Shetty, Paresh Rawal, Rimi Sen, Vijay Raaz, Johnny Lever, Asrani, Aftab Shivdasani, Vivek Oberoi, Baljeet Singh, Om Puri, Supriya Pilgaonkar, Suresh Menon	Romantic comedy	UTV Motion Pictures, Base Industries Group
N O V	25	The Film	Junaid Memon	Mahima Chaudhry, Khalid Siddiqui, Ananya Khare, Chahat Khanna, Ravi Gossain, Vaibhav Jhalani, Vivek Madan	Thriller	
D E C	2	Apaharan	Prakash Jha	Ajay Devgn, Bipasha Basu, Nana Patekar, Murli Sharma, Ayub Khan, Mrinalini Sharma, Pankaj Tripathi, Mukesh Tiwari	Drama	
D E C	2	Home Delivery	Sujoy Ghosh	Vivek Oberoi, Mahima Chaudhry, Karan Johar, Ayesha Takia, Sanjay Suri, Juhi Chawla, Boman Irani, Sunil Shetty	Comedy	
D E C	2	Mr Ya Miss	Antara Mali	Rushad Rana, Antara Mali, Aftab Shivdasani, Riteish Deshmukh	Comedy	
D E C	9	Ek Ajnabee	Apoorva Lakhia	Amitabh Bachchan, Arjun Rampal, Perizaad Zorabian, Vikram Chatwal, Abhishek Bachchan, Akhilendra Mishra	Thriller	
D E C	9	Kalyug	Mohit Suri	Kunal Khemu, Amrita Singh, Emraan Hashmi, Deepal Shaw, Smilie Suri, Ashutosh Rana, Atul Parchure, Sheena Bajaj	Drama	
D E C	9	Neal 'n' Nikki	Arjun Sablok	Uday Chopra, Tanisha, Abhishek Bachchan, Gaurav Gera, Richa Pallod	Comedy, romance	
D E C	16	Bluffmaster!	Rohan Sippy	Abhishek Bachchan, Priyanka Chopra, Mahesh Thakur, Nana Patekar, Riteish Deshmukh, Boman Irani, Tinnu Anand, Sanjay Mishra	Comedy	UTV Motion Pictures, Entertainment One, Ramesh Sippy Entertainment
D E C	23	Dosti: Friends Forever	Suneel Darshan	Akshay Kumar, Bobby Deol, Lara Dutta, Kareena Kapoor, Juhi Chawla, Shakti Kapoor, Lillete Dubey, Aman Verma, Sherlyn Chopra, Karishma Tanna, Kiran Kumar	Drama, romance	
D E C	23	Vaah! Life Ho Toh Aisi!	Mahesh Manjrekar	Sanjay Dutt, Shahid Kapoor, Amrita Rao, Arshad Warsi, Mohnish Bahl, Radhika Apte, Rajat Bedi, Upasna Singh	Fantasy, comedy	
D E C	30	Anjaane	Harry W. Fernandes	Manisha Koirala, Sanjay Kapoor	Thriller	
D E C	30	Mr Prime Minister	Dev Anand	Dev Anand, Prem Chopra, Milind Gunaji, A.K. Hangal	Drama	
D E C	30	Shikhar	John Matthew Matthan	Ajay Devgn, Bipasha Basu, Shahid Kapoor, Javed Sheikh, Amrita Rao, John Abraham	Drama	Cinematt Pictures

== See also ==
- List of Hindi films of 2006
- List of Hindi films of 2004
