= List of awards and nominations received by Himesh Reshammiya =

Himesh Reshammiya awards and nominations
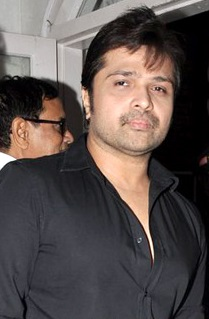
- Reshammiya at Sonu Nigam's mother's prayer meet
Awards and nominations
Award	Wins	Nominations
Bollywood Movie Awards	1	4
Filmfare Awards	1	8
IIFA Awards	1	4
Screen Awards	1	3
Star Guild Awards	1	4
Stardust Awards	1	3
Zee Cine Awards	4	10
BIG Star Entertainment Awards	3	6
MTV Immies	2	2
Mirchi Music Awards	0	2
Vijay Awards	0	1
Golden Kela Awards	2	5
The Ghanta Awards	2	5

Totals (Note: Certain award groups do not simply award one winner. They acknowledge several different recipients, have runners-up, and have third place. Since this is a specific recognition and is different from losing an award, runner-up mentions are considered wins in this award tally. For simplification and to avoid errors, each award in this list has been presumed to have had a prior nomination.)
- Wins: 16
- Nominations: 47

This is a list of awards and nominations received by Himesh Reshammiya.

== Filmfare Awards ==
Year	Category	Film/Songs	Status
2003	Best Music Director	Humraaz	Nominated
2004	Best Music Director	Tere Naam	Nominated
2006	Best Male Playback	"Aashiq Banaya Aapne" (Aashiq Banaya Aapne)	Won
2006	Best Music Director	Aashiq Banaya Aapne	Nominated
2007	Best Male Playback	"Jhalak Dikhlaja" (Aksar)	Nominated
2007	Best Music Director	Aksar	Nominated
2008	Best Male Debut	Aap Kaa Surroor	Nominated
2015	Best Music Director	Kick	Nominated

== Star Screen Awards ==
Year	Category	Films/Songs	Status
2004	Best Music Director	Tere Naam	Won
2006	Best Music Director	Aashiq Banaya Aapne	Nominated
2015	Best Music Director	Kick	Nominated

== Zee Cine Awards ==
Year	Category	Films/Songs	Status
2004	Best Music Director	Tere Naam	Won
2005	Best Music Director	Aitraaz	Nominated
2006	Best Playback (Male)	"Aashiq Banaya Aapne" (Aashiq Banaya Aapne)	Won
2006	Best Music Director	Maine Pyaar Kyun Kiya?	Nominated
2006	Best Music Director	Aashiq Banaya Aapne	Nominated
2007	Best Playback (Male)	"Jhalak Dikhlaja" (Aksar)	Nominated
2007	Best Music Director	Aksar	Nominated
2008	Best Promising Newcomer	Aap Kaa Surroor	Nominated
2012	Best Music Director	Bodyguard	Won
2016	Best Song of the Year	"Prem Ratan Dhan Payo" (Prem Ratan Dhan Payo)	Won

== IIFA Awards ==
Year	Category	Films/Songs	Status
2003	Best Music Director	Tere Naam	Nominated
2005	Best Music Director	Aitraaz	Nominated
2006	Best Male Playback	"Aashiq Banaya Aapne" (Aashiq Banaya Aapne)	Won
2006	Best Music Director	Aashiq Banaya Aapne	Nominated

== Star Guild Awards ==
Year	Category	Films/Songs	Status
2004	Best Music Director	Tere Naam	Nominated
2006	Best Music Director	Aashiq Banaya Aapne	Nominated
2011	Best Music Director	Bodyguard	Won
2015	Best Music Director	"Jumme Ki Raat" (Kick)	Nominated

== BIG Star Entertainment Awards ==
Year	Category	Films/Songs	Status
2011	Best Music Director	Bodyguard	Won
2011	Best Song of The Year	"Teri Meri" (Bodyguard)	Won
2014	Best Music Director	Kick	Nominated
2014	Best Music Director	The Xposé	Nominated
2015	Best Music Director	Prem Ratan Dhan Payo	Won
2015	Best Song	Prem Ratan Dhan Payo (Title Track)	Nominated

== Bollywood Movie Awards ==
Year	Category	Films/Songs	Status
2006	Best Music Director	Aashiq Banaya Aapne	Won
2007	Best Music Director	Aksar	Nominated
2007	Best Song of the Year	"Jhalak Dikhlaja" (Aksar)	Nominated
2007	Best Male Playback	"Yeh Tera Mera Milna" (Aap Kaa Surroor)	Nominated

== MTV Immies ==
Year	Category	Films/Songs	Status
2006	Best Composer	Aashiq Banaya Aapne	Won
2005	Best New Film Music Talent	Aashiq Banaya Aapne	Won

== Stardust Awards ==
Year	Category	Films/Songs	Status
2008	Superstar of Tomorrow (Male)	Aap Kaa Surroor	Nominated
2013	Breakthrough Supporting Performance (Male)	Khiladi 786	Won
2015	Best Music Director	Prem Ratan Dhan Payo	Nominated

== Mirchi Music Awards ==
Year	Category	Films/Songs	Status
2011	Album of the Year	Bodyguard	Nominated
2011	Music Composer of the Year	"Teri Meri" (Bodyguard)	Nominated

== Vijay Awards ==
Year	Category	Films/Songs	Status
2008	Favourite Song	Kallai Mattum (Dasavathaaram)	Nominated

== Pinkvilla Screen and Style Icons Awards ==
Year	Category	Films/Songs	Result	Ref.
27 March 2025	Most Iconic Entertainer	Badass Ravikumar	Won	
