= 51st Filmfare Awards =

2006 awards for Hindi cinema

- Date: 25 February 2006
- Site: Bandra-Kurla Complex, Mumbai
- Hosted by: Javed Jaffrey
- Official website: www.filmfare.com

Highlights
- Best Film: Black
- Critics Award for Best Film: Black
- Most awards: Black (11)
- Most nominations: Parineeta (13)

Television coverage
- Network: Sony Entertainment Television (India)

The 51st Filmfare Awards honoring Indian films took place on 25 February 2006 at the Bandra-Kurla Complex in Mumbai. The show was hosted by Javed Jaffrey.

Parineeta led the ceremony with 13 nominations, followed by Black with 11 nominations.

Black received 11 awards at the ceremony – tying the record set by Bhansali's previous directorial Devdas (2002) – including Best Film, Best Film (Critics), Best Director (Sanjay Leela Bhansali), Best Actor, Best Actor (Critics) (both for Amitabh Bachchan), Best Actress, Best Actress (Critics) (both for Rani Mukherji) and Best Supporting Actress (Ayesha Kapur, thus becoming the youngest nominee and eventual winner of an acting Filmfare Award).

Amitabh Bachchan received two nominations for Best Actor for his performances in Black and Sarkar, winning for the former.

Rani Mukerji also received dual nominations for Best Actress for her performances in Black and Bunty Aur Babli, winning for the former.

== Winners and Nominees ==
=== Main awards ===
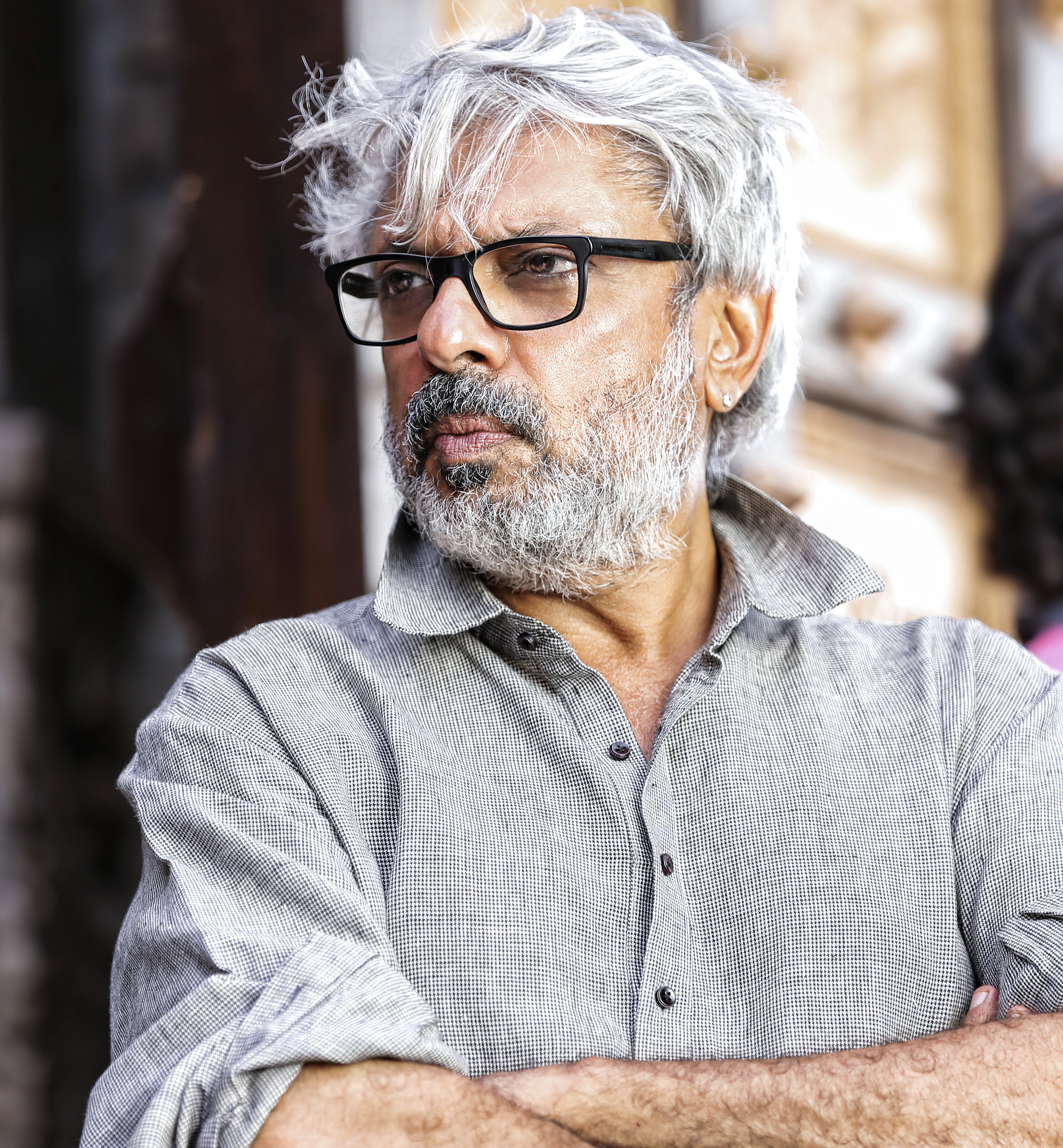
Sanjay Leela Bhansali, Best Director winner

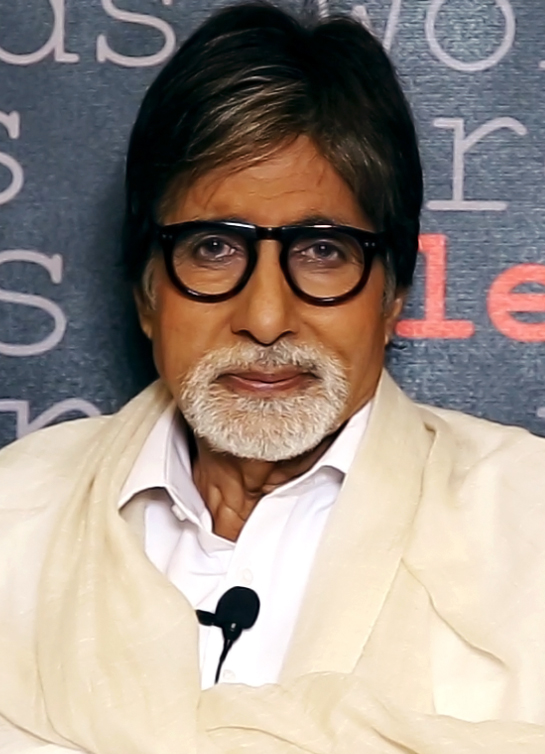
Amitabh Bachchan, Best Actor winner

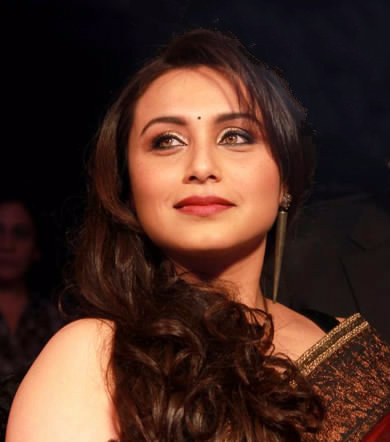
Rani Mukerji, Best Actress winner

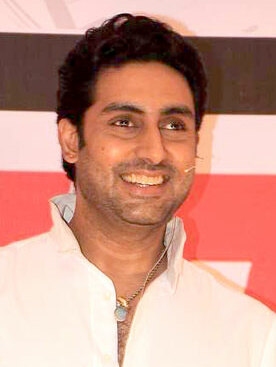
Abhishek Bachchan, Best Supporting Actor winner

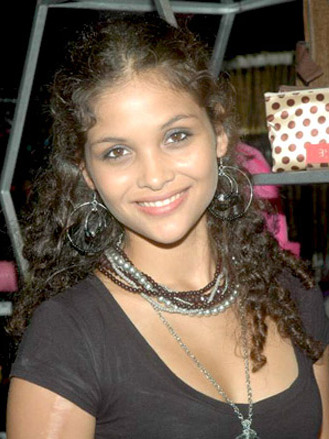
Ayesha Kapur, Best Supporting Actor winner

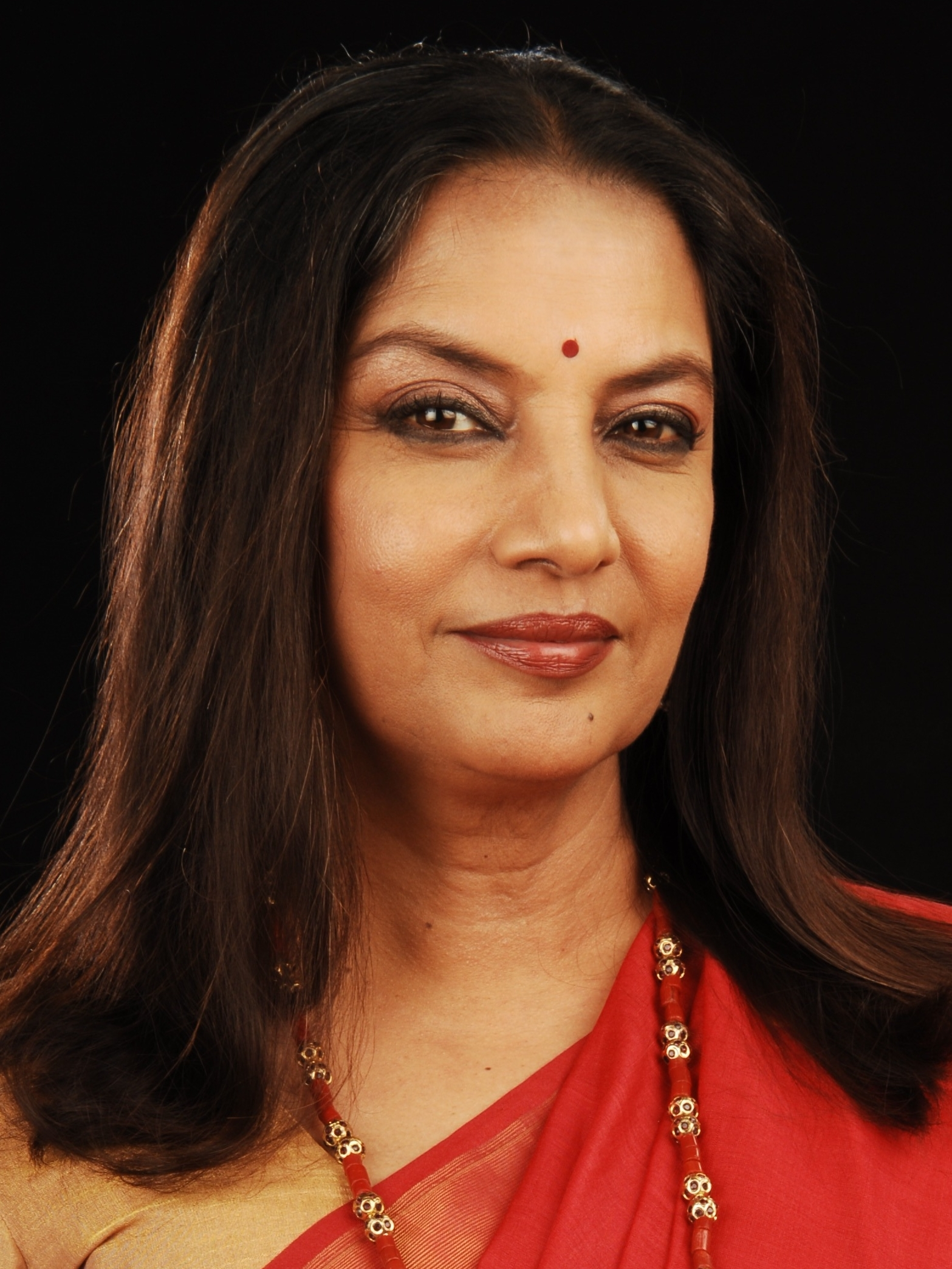
Shabana Azmi, Lifetime Achievement Awardee

Best Film	Best Director
Black – Applause Entertainment and SLB Films; Bunty Aur Babli – Yash Raj Films; No Entry – Sahara One Motion Pictures and SK Film Entertainment; Page 3 – Sahara One Motion Pictures and Lighthouse Films Pvt. Ltd.; Parineeta – Vidhu Vinod Chopra	Sanjay Leela Bhansali – Black; Madhur Bhandarkar – Page 3; Nagesh Kukunoor – Iqbal; Pradeep Sarkar – Parineeta; Ram Gopal Verma – Sarkar
Best Actor	Best Actress
Amitabh Bachchan – Black as Debraj Sahai; Aamir Khan – Mangal Pandey: The Rising as Mangal Pandey; Amitabh Bachchan – Sarkar as Subhash Nagre (Sarkar); Abhishek Bachchan – Bunty Aur Babli as Bunty (Rakesh Trivedi); Saif Ali Khan – Parineeta as Shekhar Roy	Rani Mukerji – Black as Michelle McNally; Preity Zinta – Salaam Namaste as Ambar "Amby" Malhotra; Rani Mukerji – Bunty Aur Babli as Babli (Vimmi Saluja); Sharmila Tagore – Viruddh as Sumitra Patwardhan; Vidya Balan – Parineeta as Lalita Roy
Best Supporting Actor	Best Supporting Actress
Abhishek Bachchan – Sarkar as Shankar Nagre; Amitabh Bachchan – Bunty Aur Babli as DCP Dashrath Singh; Arshad Warsi – Salaam Namaste as Ranjan "Ron" Mathur; Naseeruddin Shah – Iqbal as Mohit Mishra; Sanjay Dutt – Parineeta as Girish Sharma	Ayesha Kapur – Black as Young Michelle McNally; Bipasha Basu – No Entry as Bobby Saluja; Sandhya Mridul – Page 3 as Pearl Sequeira; Shefali Shah – Waqt: The Race Against Time as Sumitra Thakur; Shweta Prasad – Iqbal as Khadija
Best Male Debut	Best Female Debut
Shiney Ahuja – Hazaaron Khwaishein Aisi	Vidya Balan – Parineeta
Best Villain	Best Comedian
Nana Patekar – Apaharan as Tabrez Alam; Ajay Devgan – Kaal as Kaali Pratap Singh; Amrita Singh – Kalyug as Simi Roy; Kay Kay Menon – Sarkar as Vishnu Nagre; Pankaj Kapoor – Dus as Himmat Mehndi / JD / Jamwal	Akshay Kumar – Garam Masala as Makrand "Mac" Deendayal Chatpatiya; Anil Kapoor – No Entry as Kishan Singhania; Javed Jaffrey – Salaam Namaste as Jaggu Yadav aka Crocodile Dundee; Rajpal Yadav – Waqt: The Race Against Time as Laxman Singh; Salman Khan – No Entry as Prem Khanna
Best Music Director	Best Lyricist
Shankar–Ehsaan–Loy – Bunty Aur Babli; Adnan Sami – Lucky: No Time for Love; Himesh Reshammiya – Aashiq Banaya Aapne; Shantanu Moitra – Parineeta; Vishal–Shekhar – Dus	Gulzar – "Kajra Re" from Bunty Aur Babli; Gulzar – "Chup Chup Ke" from Bunty Aur Babli; Gulzar – "Dheere Jalna" from Paheli; Sameer – "Aashiq Banaya Aapne" from Aashiq Banaya Aapne; Swanand Kirkire – "Piyu Bole" from Parineeta
Best Playback Singer – Male	Best Playback Singer – Female
Himesh Reshamiya – "Aashiq Banaya Aapne" from Aashiq Banaya Aapne; Atif Aslam – "Woh Lamhe" from Zeher; Shaan and KK – "Dus Bahane" from Dus; Sonu Nigam – "Piyu Bole" from Parineeta; Sonu Nigam – "Dheere Jalna" from Paheli	Alisha Chinai – "Kajra Re" from Bunty Aur Babli; Shreya Ghoshal – "Agar Tum Mil Jao" from Zeher; Shreya Ghoshal – "Piyu Bole" from Parineeta; Sunidhi Chauhan – "Kaisi Paheli" from Parineeta; Sunidhi Chauhan – "Deedar De" from Dus

=== Critics' awards ===
Best Film
Black (Sanjay Leela Bhansali)
Best Performance
Best Actor	Best Actress
Amitabh Bachchan – Black	Rani Mukerji – Black

=== Technical Awards ===
Best Story	Best Screenplay
Sudhir Mishra, Ruchi Narain, Shiv Kumar Subramaniam – Hazaaron Khwaishein Aisi	Nina Arora, Manoj Tyagi – Page 3
Best Dialogue	Best Editing
Prakash Jha – Apharan	Bela Sehgal – Black
Best Choreography	Best Cinematography
Howard Rosemeyer – "Kaisi Paheli" from Parineeta	Ravi K. Chandran – Black
Best Production Design	Best Sound Design
Keshto Mondal, Tanushree Sarkar and Pradeep Sarkar – Parineeta	Bishwadeep Chatterjee – Parineeta
Best Action	Best Background Score
Allan Amin – Dus	Monty Sharma – Black

=== Special awards ===
Lifetime Achievement Award
Shabana Azmi
R. D. Burman Award
Shantanu Moitra
Power Award
Yash Chopra	Aditya Chopra

== See also ==
- Filmfare Awards
- 52nd Filmfare Awards
- List of highest-grossing Bollywood films
