= Aashiq Banaya Aapne (song) =

2005 song by Himesh Reshammiya and Shreya Ghoshal

Song by Himesh Reshammiya and Shreya Ghoshal

from the album Aashiq Banaya Aapne
- Language: Hindi
- Released: 29 July 2005
- Genre: Filmi, romantic
- Length: 4:50
- Label: T-Series
- Composer: Himesh Reshammiya
- Lyricist: Sameer

"Aashiq Banaya Aapne" is a Hindi-language song from the 2005 Indian film Aashiq Banaya Aapne. Composed by Himesh Reshammiya with lyrics by Sameer Anjaan, it is performed by Reshammiya and Shreya Ghoshal. The song emerged as a commercially successful Hindi film song in the mid-2000s and marked a turning point in Reshammiya's career as a playback singer.

The song was released on 29 July 2005 as part of the film's soundtrack album by T-Series. It marked one of composer Himesh Reshammiya's earliest major songs as a playback singer and became a breakthrough success, earning him the Filmfare Award for Best Male Playback Singer.

== Background and development ==
Composer Himesh Reshammiya initially created "Aashiq Banaya Aapne" for a film directed by Abbas–Mustan, but the composition was later incorporated into Aashiq Banaya Aapne. According to director Aditya Datt, the popularity of the song during production also led to the film being retitled after the track. Datt stated that Reshammiya had initially wanted a fresh male playback singer for the song. However, after hearing Reshammiya during rehearsals, Datt encouraged him to record the track himself. Datt also said that Shreya Ghoshal was selected for the female portions because he wanted a relatively new voice that could bring the “seduction” required by both the composition and the visual treatment.

The song was composed during a transitional phase in Reshammiya's career, when he began performing his own compositions. His work during this period combined electronic arrangements with melodic frameworks rooted in Hindi film music traditions.

Musicologist Sangita Gopal has noted that the increasing prominence of composer-singers during this period reflected broader shifts in Bollywood music production practices.

The song was composed by Himesh Reshammiya for the soundtrack of Aashiq Banaya Aapne, directed by Aditya Datt. According to Reshammiya, the song was conceived as a sensual romantic ballad with a hook-driven melody intended to appeal to younger audiences.

The commercial success of the song marked a turning point in Reshammiya's career as a playback singer and contributed significantly to his emergence as a leading singer-composer in Hindi cinema during the mid-2000s.

=== Composition ===
The song combines synthesised beats with orchestral textures, reflecting early 21st-century trends in Hindi film music.

== Credits and personnel ==
- Himesh Reshammiya – Composer, Vocals
- Shreya Ghoshal – Vocals
- Sameer – Lyrics
- T-Series – Label

== Release and promotion ==
The song was released on 29 July 2005 as part of the soundtrack album through T-Series.

== Music video ==
The music video features Emraan Hashmi and Tanushree Dutta, presenting a narrative centered on romantic and physical attraction. In the remix version of the music video, composer-singer Reshammiya also appears, and lead actress Dutta enjoys watching him perform on the television.

Scholars have identified such representations as part of a broader shift toward more explicit visual storytelling in Hindi cinema during the 2000s.

== Reception ==
The song received positive responses from critics. A review by Rediff described the soundtrack as catchy and commercially appealing, with the title track standing out for its memorable hook.

=== Controversy ===
The song and its music video generated discussion due to their sensual imagery. Academic analyses have linked this to changing aesthetic norms in Hindi film music videos during the early 2000s.

=== Impact ===
The success of the song significantly contributed to Reshammiya's rise as a playback singer.

=== Commercial performance and legacy ===
The song remains one of Reshammiya's signature tracks. Gregory D. Booth identifies such compositions as reflective of increasing globalisation in Indian film music production.

== Remake ==
A recreated version of the song was released for the 2018 film Hate Story 4. The remake was composed by Tanishk Bagchi, and the lyrics were penned by Manoj Muntashir and sung by Neha Kakkar and Reshammiya himself. Such recreations form part of a broader trend of remixing earlier Bollywood songs for contemporary audiences.

== Accolades ==
| Year | Awards | Category | Recipient | Results | Ref(s) |
|---|---|---|---|---|---|
| 2006 | Filmfare Awards | Best Male Playback Singer | Himesh Reshammiya | Won | |
| 2006 | Filmfare Awards | Best Lyricist | Sameer | Nominated | |
| 2006 | Filmfare Awards | Best Music Director | Himesh Reshammiya | Nominated | |
| 2006 | IIFA Awards | Best Male Playback Singer | Himesh Reshammiya | Won | |
| 2006 | IIFA Awards | Best Lyrics | Sameer | Nominated | |
| 2006 | IIFA Awards | Best Music Director | Himesh Reshammiya | Nominated | |
