= Black (2005 film) =

2005 film directed by Sanjay Leela Bhansali

- Theatrical release poster
- Directed by: Sanjay Leela Bhansali
- Screenplay by: Sanjay Leela Bhansali; Bhavani Iyer; Prakash Kapadia
- Story by: Adapted Story: Sanjay Leela Bhansali; Original Story: Helen Keller
- Based on: The Story of My Life by Helen Keller
- Produced by: Sanjay Leela Bhansali; Anshuman Swami
- Starring: Amitabh Bachchan; Rani Mukerji
- Narrated by: Rani Mukerji
- Cinematography: Ravi K. Chandran
- Edited by: Bela Segal
- Music by: Monty Sharma
- Production companies: Applause Entertainment; SLB Films
- Distributed by: Zee Motion Pictures (India) Yash Raj Films (Overseas)
- Release date: 4 February 2005
- Running time: 124 minutes
- Country: India
- Languages: Hindi; English
- Budget: ₹20–22 crore (Note: Sources inconsistently reported the total budget of Black; Lata Khubchandani of Outlook wrote ₹200 million (US$4.54 million), Surajeet Das Gupta of Business Standard said ₹210 million (US$4.76 million), Kaveree Bamzai of India Today mentioned ₹215 million (US$4.88 million) and The Financial Express stated that the number was ₹220 million (US$4.99 million).)
- Box office: ₹40.9 crore

Black is a 2005 Indian drama film co-written, directed, and co-produced by Sanjay Leela Bhansali. It stars Amitabh Bachchan and Rani Mukerji in lead roles, with Ayesha Kapur, Shernaz Patel, and Dhritiman Chatterjee in supporting parts. The film narrates the story of Michelle (Mukerji), a deafblind woman, and her relationship with her teacher Debraj (Bachchan), an elderly alcoholic teacher who himself later develops Alzheimer's disease. The film, primarily in Hindi, also contains significant English dialogue.

In 2003, Bhansali announced the production of his new project, Black. Its idea first came up when Bhansali met several disabled children during the making of Khamoshi: The Musical (1996). The screenplay was influenced by Keller's 1903 autobiography, The Story of My Life. Principal photography was done by Ravi K. Chandran in 100 days from mid-January to April 2004, taking place in Shimla and Film City. Omung Kumar was the production designer, while Sham Kaushal was the action director. After filming, it was edited by Bela Sehgal. The soundtrack and score were composed by Monty Sharma.

Black released worldwide on 4 February 2005, and received widespread critical acclaim upon release, with praise for its direction, story, screenplay, dialogues, cinematography, production design, costumes, and the performances of the cast, with major praise directed towards Bachchan and Mukherji's performances, and Bhansali's direction and screenplay. The film grossed ₹409 million (US$9.27 million), and became the eighth highest-grossing Hindi film of the year.

At the 53rd National Film Awards, Black won three awards, including Best Feature Film in Hindi and Best Actor in a Leading Role (Bachchan). At the 51st Filmfare Awards, it won all eleven of its nominations, including Best Film, Best Film (Critics), Best Director (Bhansali), Best Actor and Best Actor (Critics) (both for Bachchan), and Best Actress and Best Actress (Critics) (both for Mukerji), becoming the most-awarded film in the history of the ceremony at that time. It was also the fifth film to win the four major Filmfare categories: Best Film, Best Director, Best Actor, and Best Actress.

== Plot ==
Michelle McNally, a 42-year-old, Anglo-Indian woman living in Shimla, is "special" in more ways than one for being deafblind and mute. She inhabits a suffocating world of infinite Black—where she is isolated in the darkness of her own existence, trapped by her inability to see, hear and speak. Michelle, her younger sister, Sara, and their mother, Catherine, find Michelle's long-lost former teacher, Debraj Sahai, near the fountain outside their house. Debraj is admitted to a mental hospital, where the doctor diagnoses him as the patient of incurable Alzheimer's disease, who has near-inability to remember his past and even how to speak. However, Michelle denies the statement and vows to help Debraj in regaining his normal mental health, in return for Debraj's kindness to help her discover her identity, which makes her feel human rather than someone inferior with a disability. The film then flashbacks to the past to Michelle's childhood. Michelle was a girl who tragically lost her eyesight, hearing and speech after recovering from an illness at the age of two. On the sheer will of her ferocious rage against destiny, Michelle grows up prone to violent outbursts for becoming more and more frustrated by the seamless, endless void in her life, where nothing reaches her and she reaches nothing. As a result, Michelle becomes a violent, uncontrollable 8-year-old child and her parents, Paul and Catherine, are at their wits' end trying to control her, especially after Catherine gives birth to Sara.

However, the light shines through the end of the tunnel one day. Debraj, an elderly alcoholic teacher for the blind and deaf in Dehradun, enters their lives and becomes a ray of hope for Michelle. Debraj sees himself as a magician and is a disillusioned eccentric man. He takes it upon himself to bring the young Michelle into the light and build her into someone who can express and communicate. Debraj even gives up salary, allowance and alcohol and only requests for time and trust to complete his mission. He uses harsh methods, although always for Michelle's long-term benefit, but Paul initially disapproves of the methods and orders Debraj to leave. Although Paul believes him to be gone, Debraj stays as the teacher while Paul is away on a business trip for 20 days. Catherine grudgingly approves of his continuation, given her fear of Michelle being sent to a mental hospital. By the 20th day, Debraj manages to teach Michelle some words and better manners, but he still has difficulty teaching her the meaning of words. When Paul returns, Debraj packs his bags and begins to leave, but at the very last moment, he gets frustrated with Michelle's continuing insolent behaviour, as he is walking towards the door with suitcase in hand. As a result, Debraj immediately takes Michelle out in the courtyard and throws her into a fountain full of water. At that moment, Michelle suddenly takes to Debraj's lessons and begins to understand the meaning of water. She is also able to identify her parents and can vocalise the first syllables of small words, causing Paul and Catherine to retain Debraj as Michelle's teacher.

22 years later, 30-year-old Michelle has learned a great deal, becoming a relaxed and expressive woman, who is even able to dance and expertly sign. Debraj convinces the principal of a university to grant her an interview, which Michelle successfully passes with assistance from Debraj's friend, Mrs. Nair, and receives admission to pursue a degree of Bachelor of Arts, the first blind-deaf person to do so at that university. Michelle moves away from home and lives with Debraj and one of her servants. Over the next two years, she struggles to gain her degree, failing year after year, but she still maintains her spirit. One reason is that she must rely on Debraj completely for interpretation of the material and studying. This problem is overcome by the principal of the college, who prepares the whole first-year Arts course of study in braille for Michelle. Another reason for the continuing failure of Michelle is that her typing skills are lacking and typing is her only way to write down what she knows during exams. However, she also soon overcomes this deficiency through another flash of increased competence when Michelle almost quits the university and gets into an argument with Debraj. At the same time as Michelle faces all her challenges with resilience, numerous other changes are also witnessed. Debraj begins to succumb to Alzheimer's disease, first forgetting the way out of the principal's office, and then forgetting Michelle and leaving her stranded during an ice-cream celebration for her improved typing.

Meanwhile, Michelle also reconciles with Sara, who turns out was always jealous of her parents' affection for Michelle throughout her life. After attending Sara's marriage, Michelle begins to wonder about love, which she has never experienced, and she even requests Debraj to kiss her on the lips. Debraj reluctantly does so but decides to leave Michelle himself because of this demand and the position she has put him in. In the present, which is twelve years after Michelle's enrollment into the college, she successfully manages to gain her BA degree, and with her proud parents looking on her, Michelle even gives a speech to the graduating class. Wearing no black graduation robe, she expresses gratitude to everyone and announces that she will only wear the robe so that her teacher may see her first. At the mental hospital, Michelle visits Debraj wearing her robe and glimmers of memory are seen returning as Debraj realises that she has graduated and even performs a victory dance. As the window opens to the rain outside, Debraj's hand is seen in Michelle's reaching into the rain, and the teacher-student pair is heard vocalising the first syllable of the word "water", with echoes of the scene in which Michelle first began understanding the meaning of words, when Debraj threw her into her fountain earlier in the film. However, this time, it is Debraj who is beginning to learn to speak and understand. The film ends with a scene of Michelle among a crowd of people, all dressed in black, carrying candles while walking towards a church. There is a voiceover of a letter that Michelle has written to Mrs. Nair, explaining that today was her teacher's first day of school, and that just like hers, his alphabet began with the letters "B L A C K", implying that Debraj had finally succumbed to his illness and died.

== Cast ==
The cast is listed below:

- Amitabh Bachchan as Debraj Sahai
- Rani Mukerji as Michelle McNally
  - Ayesha Kapur as young Michelle
- Shernaz Patel as Catherine "Kathy" McNally
- Dhritiman Chatterjee as Paul McNally
- Nandana Sen as Sarah McNally
- Sillo Mahava as Mrs. Gomes
- Mahabanoo Mody-Kotwal as Mrs. Nair
- Kenny Desai as Dr. Mehta
- Khursheed Khurody as a pianist at Sarah's wedding
- Shehnaz Anand as a teacher
- Zul Vellani and Kamal Adip as trustees

== Production ==
=== Development ===
The production of Black started when Sanjay Leela Bhansali came up with the idea for the film while the shooting of his directorial debut, the musical Khamoshi: The Musical, between 1993 and 1994 when he interacted with physically disabled children. After the successes of the romance Hum Dil De Chuke Sanam (1999) and the historical epic Devdas (2002)—one of the most expensive Hindi films ever made at the time—he had made a plan to make another film in the romantic genre. Still, the actress Jaya Bachchan criticized his work from Devdas and encouraged him to "attempt something different"; in later years, he would say that it motivated him to make Black. Bhansali chose to address a subject that no other director had done before: "I didn't want to stop making a film straight from my heart because of the fear of losing my audiences." He described it as "a step towards a more complex kind of film than what we get in mainstream cinema", adding, "It is an uplifting tale on the triumph of the human spirit." He announced the film in July 2003, along with his other project, Bajirao Mastani, which would be released in 2015. The media declared it as his "most personal film".

Bhansali revealed that he was inspired by American activist Helen Keller's life story. However, he stated that he only used it as a reference and the film was "a completely original piece of work". Additionally, Bhansali also read Keller's autobiography The Story of My Life and other related books, including Geraldine Lawhorn's On the Crossroads (about a deafblind musician). In an interview with The Hindu, he said, "I was fascinated by the ways in which teachers and parents struggled to reach out to the [deaf] children. How do you start the communication? How do you keep it going? What takes other children a year to learn takes 10 years for them to absorb." In addition, some sources claimed that it served as a remake of Arthur Penn's The Miracle Worker (1962), but Bhansali denied the reports. Others claimed that the film was based on Prakash Kapadia's Gujarati play Aatam Vinjhe Paankh, which was inspired by The Miracle Worker.

Bhansali chose the word black for the film's title; according to him, black is his favorite color and he felt it has a "universal resonance". He explained how the color's monotones and shades were "very attractive if used intelligently", and it was "the best element ... that ... doesn't overshadow the characters or narrative". He added that it was "a powerful striking colour which describes the film's sensitivities", and defined his mood and temperament. "I wear black clothes most of the time. The colour calms me. When I decided to make a film about the world of the [blind], Black was the title that came to mind immediately", he said when interviewed by Sify. The same title had been registered by the actor Kumar Gaurav before, and Bhansali asked him to relinquish and gave the title for his next project. According to an article published by Screen in November 2005, Gaurav saw that the film was "bold and path-breaking"; consequently, he finally gave up the title. As gratitude, Bhansali credited Gaurav's name in the opening credits of Black.

Bhansali told The Telegraph that Keller's life was an "exemplary to all of us", believing that he had "personally learned so much from her"; he stated that he learned "the value of a teacher in any student's life". Journalists asserted that his involvement in both Black and Bajirao Mastani (a period film about the Peshwa Baji Rao I and his second wife Mastani) proved his ability in two opposite film genres; he expressed: "It is a conscious process of rejuvenation as a filmmaker. I have to reinvent myself as a creative person." He then described the former film as "an uplifting tale on the triumph of the human spirit", and it was "about feeling, not speaking". Furthermore, he added, "Black is about the love between a girl and her teacher. They teach each other the dignity of living. To call Black a love story is a true compliment. Black is a pure love story."

=== Casting ===
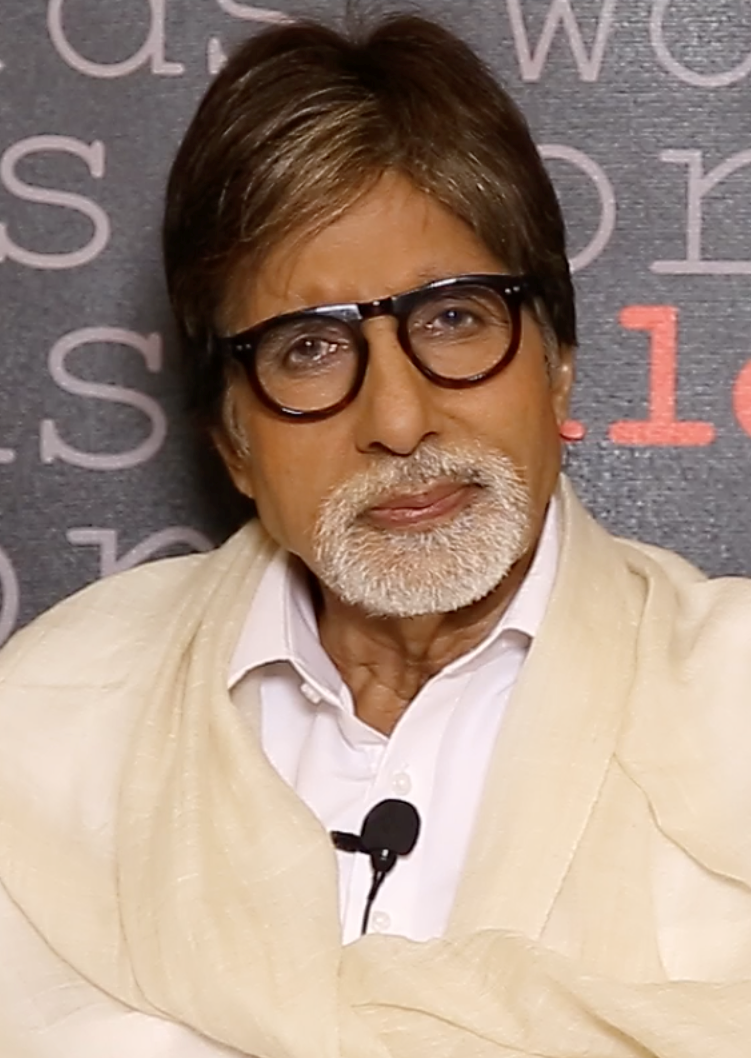
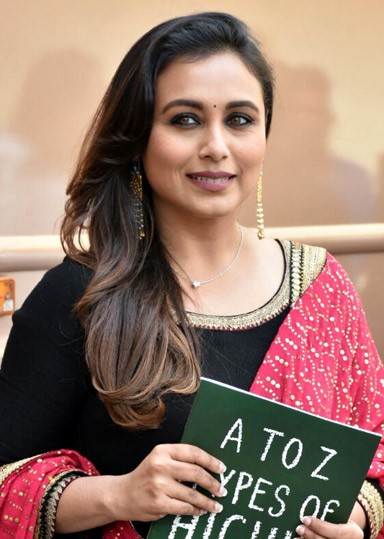
The lead actors of Black: Amitabh Bachchan (left) and Rani Mukerji

On the same day of the film's announcement, Amitabh Bachchan and Rani Mukerji were officially cast in the lead roles. Bachchan featured as Debraj Sahai, a role which he described as a "brilliant teacher but an alcoholic", and he took it as an attempt to avoid typecasting. Bhansali, who is a "diehard fan" of him, said that he actually wanted to cast him (and his wife Jaya) in Khamoshi: The Musical. However, that was the time when Bachchan took a hiatus from his acting career. Bhansali eventually cast Bachchan in Black, after the actor watched his previous work, Hum Dil De Chuke Sanam (1999). Bachchan had big expectations with Black, as he said in an interview with the Deccan Herald, "I feel the Indian audience should like this film." He praised the "fascinating" and "unusual" screenplay of the film, stating, "To be very frank, I would have said 'Yes' even without listening to the script."

To prepare for his part, Bachchan underwent special training before the shooting. He visited schools for physically disabled children and learned haptic communication, which he found to be "very weird because we can not see, hear or talk", from them for six to seven months; he read some books related on it. Also, he did extensive research about Alzheimer's disease and what happens after a person being affected by it. He thought that it "was the most-challenging role... It is a first-time experience because there is not even a single scene in this film that I felt I have done before."

Meanwhile, Mukerji got the role of Michelle McNally and confirmed her involvement in the film in July 2003. She spoke positively of her rapport with Bachchan, and stated that she felt "humbled" with the actor, describing him as "a very modest person, very sweet, a father figure". Same as Bachchan, she accepted it to avoid the typecasting in romantic roles. Mukerji revealed that she was initially reluctant to play the part, when Bhansali read the story Black to her in June that year, because of the "challenging" subject and she had no reference to do it. She confessed, "I was scared when I heard the script. I wondered how I will play this character." In preparation, she also met children with physical disabilities, this time, at the Helen Keller Institute in Mumbai and practiced a sign language there for six months. According to Mukerji, her interaction with them helped her to "gain sensitivity towards their reactions, aspirations and hopes". Moreover, she had to learn braille and found the experience was "like speaking with my hands and my fingers." In spite of that, she said that the film "has made me realize that those who are physically or mentally [disabled] are actually much stronger than [abled] human beings."

The child artist Ayesha Kapur made her debut with Black, playing the version of Michelle. She learned a sign language for prepared her brief role as well as Mukerji. Media reports stated that it was "the most difficult character ever written for a child", but Kapur refused that by saying, "I don't know how I played Michelle. I just did it. It wasn't that difficult, really." Shernaz Patel, who had only one film experience in Mahesh Bhatt's drama Janam (1985), portrayed Michelle's mother Catherine "Kathy"; she was cast by casting director Amita Sehgal on the basis of her work as a theatre actress. Nandana Sen played Michelle's younger sister Sarah, a role she described as "an emotional experience". She observed of her part, "... she's a typical 16 year old ... You see her evolving in the film, from this oversensitive, moody teenager who is constantly hungry for more affection to a nurturing, loving, caregiver who deals with her sister's circumstances with a lot of love and understanding." She found Black to be "a pathbreaking film, both in terms of content and style", and called her role "a breakthrough" in her acting career. For it, she learned how to communicate with a sign language, four months before the shooting.

=== Pre-production ===
"Here the look was so intense and understated that I couldn't bring anything that I usually do. It was never the play of colours and that special juxtaposition and rhythm that colours bring. It was particularly fascinating for me because the look was so monochromatic, so minimalist. It was pure ... and I seriously feel that I evolved to a new plane while doing that look."

— Costume designer Sabyasachi Mukherjee on his work in Black in 2005

Bhansali—with his production company SLB Films—produced, financed, and distributed the film alongside Anshuman Swami of Applause Entertainment; another company, Yash Raj Films, also served as a distributor. Bhansali wrote the screenplay in three months, and the story with Bhavani Iyer and Kapadia; the latter two also wrote the dialogues in English and Hindi, respectively. When asked by Rediff.com's Subhash K. Jha, Bhansali found the English dialogues to be "too lucid to be left behind in translation". Omung Kumar was the art director for Black. In a party sequence featuring all of the lead cast from the film, he used 200 lamps on the ceiling. According to India Today, Bhansali was not sure about it, but he allowed Kumar to do that as an "experiment". He used black as the main color to be in tune with the film's themes.

Clothes for all actors from Black were done by the costume designer Sabyasachi Mukherjee for eight months. He spoke of excitement involved in the project: "Black was a brilliant experience, literally a once in a lifetime experience." He added that "the film is about you and me and, therefore, it called for serious clothes." In preparation, Mukherjee saw many black-and-white photographs. He used a lot of monochromatic colors—including beige, black, brown, gray, khaki, and indigo—for the film, as it is set between the 1950s and 1960s. For her role, Mukerji (who has brown eyes) was required to use dark-tinted contact lenses. After the release of Black, Sabyasachi Mukherjee talked about his experiment with the film's two leads; he found working with Bachchan to be "amazing", as the latter "is so down-to-earth", and similarly to Mukerji, saying that she was the "girl-next-door".

Ranbir Kapoor and Sonam Kapoor were chosen as assistant directors for Bhansali; the newcomers confessed that their motives were to get Bhansali to offer them acting jobs. They later made their debut as actors in Bhansali's next directorial venture, Saawariya (2007), an adaptation of Fyodor Dostoevsky's 1848 short story "White Nights", which was commercially and critically failed. Kapoor would go on to become one of the highest-paid actors in Bollywood while establishing himself as a leading actor of Indian cinema. Ahuja has a good career in Bollywood as well.

=== Filming ===
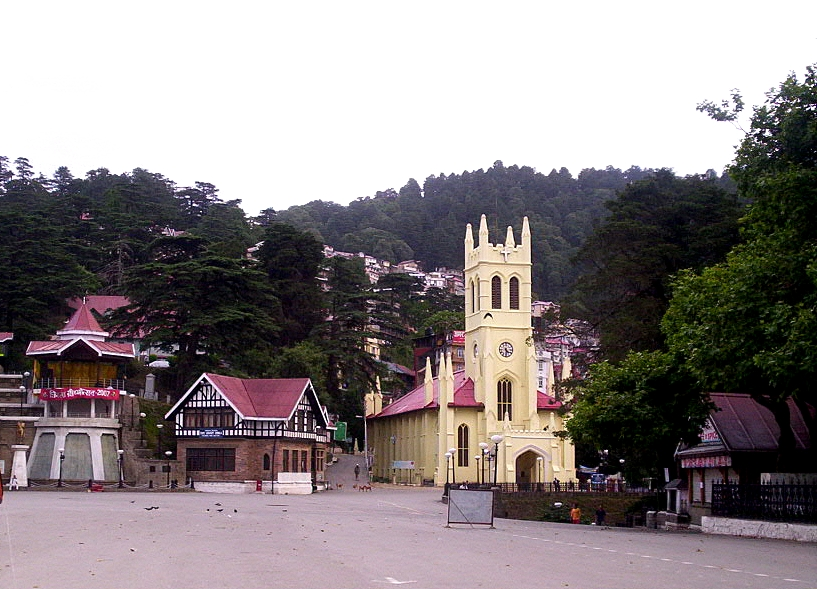
The first schedule of Black took place in Shimla

Black was filmed in 100 days by Ravi K. Chandran. In an interview with Rediff.com, Chandran called it one of the most "important" films in his career and considered it as his favorite project; this also marked the first time he shot a film without songs. He revealed that he had previously rejected Bhansali's offers to shoots Devdas as he had busy schedules at that time. However, Chandran promised to collaborate with Bhansali in his next venture, which would be Black. When Bhansali narrated the film's story to him, Chandran decided to use the cinematography style same with that of Guru Dutt's 1959 drama Kaagaz Ke Phool. Sham Kaushal was the action director. Kapoor served as a body-double for Bachchan in several scenes.

In mid-January 2004, the entire cast and crew of Black went to Shimla to begin the first schedule. The first sequence filmed was the film's opening scene, featuring Mukerji stretching out her hand when snow begins to fall. Shimla was very cold at the time, but it did not show any signs that snow would fall. Therefore, the crew bought kilos of salt and snow-making machines from Mumbai's local markets. The media reported that the shooting would end at 04:00.

Filming moved to the film studio complex Film City the next month and India Today said that seventy percent of Black was shot there. The studio, which has a 15,000-square-foot (1,400 m^{2}) area, was rented by Bhansali in January 2004 for 45 days, but on 18 February, a fire burned most of the set, resulting in a shooting delay. Bhansali recalled, "It was a torturous exercise and I couldn't sleep, but we needed continuity. I would not shoot if the cottage looked different." In June 2005, the Maharashtra Film, Stage and Cultural Development Corporation fined Bhansali ₹60 million (US$1.36 million), with ₹20 million (US$453,514.74) for its reconstruction and ₹40 million (US$907,029.48) for its rental cost. A month later, the art dealer Farida Hoosenwally also accused him for not return 390 artifacts she lent, and she sent a complaint letter to the Deputy Chief Minister of Maharashtra R. R. Patil. According to the media reports, the incidents made the initial budget of the film—estimated ₹135 million (US$3.06 million)—increased to more than ₹200 million (US$4.54 million). The schedule was continued on 28 February 2004. The filming was done two months later, and Bhansali's sister Bela Sehgal edited it. Canadian composer Mychael Danna completed its background score.

== Soundtrack ==
In October 2003, an article written by Savita Gautham of The Hindu reported that A. R. Rahman would work as the composer for Black. However, Monty Sharma (who previously collaborated with Bhansali in Devdas) replaced him for an unknown reason. Unlike Bhansali's previous ventures, it has only one lyrics-contained song, titled "Haan Maine Chukar Dekha Hai", written by Prasoon Joshi and performed by Gayatri Iyer.

The entire soundtrack album, which has thirty-three songs, was released on iTunes on 10 February 2005 by Yash Raj Films' subsidiary YRF Music. The music was positively reviewed by several critics. For his work, Monty Sharma won the Best Background Score trophy at the 51st Filmfare Awards. Additionally, he also won IIFA Award, Screen Award, and Zee Cine Award in the same category.

== Release ==
Black garnered attention before its release. In The Hindu Internet poll of "The Most Awaited Movie of 2005", the film peaked the first position with 66 percent. The trade analyst Amod Mehra felt that the film had good word-of-mouth publicity, though he believed that it would attract a restricted audience, especially in rural and semi-rural markets because of the extensive English dialogue. A similar sentiment was shared by the exhibitor Manoj Desai, saying that the film's subject was "very sensitive" and its first show would "decide the final outcome". The critic and journalist Taran Adarsh, however, stated: "It will be a great film. I am eagerly awaiting the premiere. Considering the technical brilliance of Bhansali, I pray that Black breaks the 2005 jinx. No film has succeeded this year so far."

"It was an experience I'll never forget... not only because it was my first retrospective at any festival, but also because of the interaction that I had to undergo with the audience after my film was screened. A lot of them were cinema students and their curiosity about our films and culture and their insightful questions made me very proud to represent our country and cinema."

— Mukerji, Casablanca Film Festival, 2005

On 24 January 2005, Bhansali organized a special screening of Black to Bachchan's and Mukerji's family, his mother and himself, and his close friends. Bachchan's wife Jaya was amazed with the film. She stated that it was "something we've never experience before. Black just ends all discussion", describing it as "the kind of movie experience that raises the scale of our cinema so high that you cannot classify its merits". The film's theatrical release was originally scheduled on 10 December 2004, but Bhansali decided to postpone it, as the date coincided with the new moon week, which he considered to be "inauspicious". It was opened in 170 different towns in India on 4 February 2005, the same day as the release of Leena Yadav's Shabd and Irfan Khan's Bullet: Ek Dhamaka. The film was released in South Korea on 28 August 2009 on 180 screens, a big number for a non-Korean film, with its distribution handled by Yash Raj Films. It clashed with two other Korean films, including Take Off and Tidal Wave.

Black has been screened at a number of events. On 21 January 2005, the film and a retrospective of Mukerji's films—Saathiya (2002), Chalte Chalte (2003), Hum Tum (2004) and Veer-Zaara (2004)—were screened with Arabic subtitles at the Casablanca Film Festival. It was showcased at the Indian Film Festival of Los Angeles on 20 April. The next month, the film was screened in the section of Marché du Film at the 2005 Cannes Film Festival. It was selected for the Indian Panorama section of the 36th International Film Festival of India in November. In 2012, the film was screened at the London Asian Film Festival. The latest was at the Seoul International Film Festival in 2017.

The world television premiere of the film took place on 25 September 2005 on Star Gold. Distributed by Dancing Dolphin, it was released on DVD on 20 November 2007 in all regions in a single-disc pack. A VCD version was released at the same time. The film was available for streaming on Amazon Prime Video in May 2017.

== Reception ==
=== Critical reception ===
Black received positive reviews, with most critics praising its story, Bhansali's direction, and the performances—mostly that from Bachchan and Mukerji. It received a rating of 87 percent on the review aggregator website Rotten Tomatoes based on six reviews, with an average rating of 8.5 out of 10.

The entertainment portal Bollywood Hungama gave the film two stars, finding it to be "relies heavily on performances". The critic observed of Mukerji, "With no dialogues in her lap, the actress conveys through expressions solely and what a terrific impact she makes! Here's a performance that should act as a reference guide for all aspiring actors. And yes, she's bound to walk away with all major awards next year as well!" Baradwaj Rangan of The New Sunday Express felt that the actress was "outstanding" in the part, which Rediff.com's Sita Menon described as "a pure, performance-driven role". Ziya Us Salam hailed her for "[pleasing] the [audience] eyes" despite her "minimal make-up". Khalid Mohammed of Mid-Day added, "Rani Mukherjee is a revelation, belting out a multi-nuanced performance which compels you to reach out for that hyperbolic adjective, awesome. Lock up all the awards already, they're hers." Devesh Sharma from Screen said that Bachchan and Mukerji have given "the performance of a lifetime", noting that with the film, "Bhansali has proved that we don't lack raw materials or the talent—all it takes is guts and a determined belief in oneself to make a world class film."

Jaspreet Pandohar of BBC opined that "Bhansali proves that neither he, nor the never better Bachchan, need a Hollywood film to produce an Oscar-worthy film [with Black]." She also took note of its production aspects; she lauded that the screenplay and cinematography were "carefully crafted" and "beautiful", respectively. In The Hindu, Gautaman Bhaskaran claimed that the film was the best among Bhansali's other directorial ventures. Namrata Joshi of Outlook wrote of how it "provides a redefining moment in commercial Hindi cinema, pushing its frontiers of narration and style". Sunny Dua of The Telegraph said, "Black is beautiful, for it is real. What is unreal is the way multicoloured, multilateral mainstream Hindi cinema has been suddenly rendered colourless. It will be hard to rate staple Bollywood fare from now, for the bar has been set way too bright by a stark, dark colour." Hindustan Times's reviewer Vinayak Chakravorty rated Black three out of five stars, appreciating Kapur's portrayal of young Michelle and described her as "the anchor of the film's first half". Similar thoughts was given by Nikhat Kazmi, who felt that Kapur was "absolutely brilliant".

India Today called the film "a world-class Hindi film" and "a landmark", and found both Bachchan and Mukerji to be "brutally unattractive but always heart wrenching"; Shruti Gupta of NDTV added that they "score yet again with their performance". Writing for another Telegraph review, Anil Grover complimented the "fantastic" chemistry between the two actors. Shubhra Gupta of The Indian Express, also positively reviewed the chemistry, hailing it was "mesmeric". Gupta, however, believed that Mukerji "who really lights up" the film, concluding, "The tilt of the head, the face, alternating between animation and vacuousness, the slightly open mouth, the bewildered lost look, the jerky gait—any or all of it could have turned Michelle into a caricature. But Rani overcomes the handicap of being 'normal', and nails all of it down with an unsparing, unsentimental starkness." The Times of India's critic Jhoomur Bose Malik praised Mukerji's costume, elaborating that "she did cut a diminutive yet striking picture with the cap, the structured black outfits and of course the no make-up look." Reviewing Bachchan's role, Subhash K. Jha saw that it resembled "Shakespearean tragic-hero" character.

Sushma Mohan of the Deccan Herald compared the film's story with Khamoshi: The Musical, and argued that it was "more complex and sensitive" but "better and finer" than the latter. The director and critic Raja Sen from Rediff.com also did a comparative review of Black with Paheli (2005), also starring Bachchan (in a guest appearance) and Mukerji (in a lead role opposite Shah Rukh Khan). He termed the former "a half-baked, often derivative and crucially flawed film", while called the latter "leads to a languorously unhurried fairytale, a unique love story told without fuss". In Black, Sen felt that its script "keeps [Mukerji's performance] from being an immortal [one]". Conversely, in Paheli, he believed that she had delivered "a powerful, sensuous, emotive performance". Derek Elley of Variety called Mukerji "seems to be hitting her stride as a serious actress". A reviewer of Empire said that Bhansali "expertly draws engaging, convincing [p]erformances" from the leads of Black despite his "unsentimental" direction. Pakistani magazine Newsline concluded, "[It] is an inspirational film and a must-see, even if only for its beautiful direction and acting."

=== Box office ===
Black was successful at the box office in India and overseas; trade analysts believed that it was influenced by its positive critical reviews. In India, the film had a theatrical run of nine weeks. It earned ₹10.3 million (US$233,560.09) on its opening day. It collected ₹34.3 million (US$370,000) on its first weekend and ₹64.7 million (US$1.47 million) at the end of its first week. The film earned ₹330 million (US$7.48 million) in India, making it the year's ninth highest-grossing film in the country. In North America, Black grossed $560,000 in four weeks. In the United Kingdom, it grossed $600,000 in four weeks. The film-trade website Box Office India estimated the Hindi language version's total collections to be ₹409.4 million (US$9.28 million), concluding its commercial performance to be "average".

In South Korea, the Korean language version was a major success upon release there in 2009. The newspaper Kyunghyang Shinmun reported that it sold 560,000 tickets and collected ₩3.8 billion ($2.98 million) within two weeks of its release. It went on to sell 877,408 tickets and gross ₩6,241,612,000, equivalent to US$5.88 million (₹256.6 million). It became the eighth highest-grossing 2005 Indian film worldwide with ₹409 million (US$9.27 million).

== Accolades ==
Black was the fifth film to win all 4 major awards (Best Film, Best Director, Best Actor, and Best Actress) at the Filmfare Awards, after Guide (1965), Dilwale Dulhania Le Jayenge (1995), Kuch Kuch Hota Hai (1998) and Devdas. The film won a total of 11 awards at the ceremony, setting a record at the time for the most trophies for a single film. However, when the 65th Filmfare Awards was held in 2019, Gully Boy broke the record with 13 awards. Black won 3 awards at the 53rd National Film Awards, including those for Best Feature Film in Hindi and Best Actor (Bachchan). It also received 2 Anandalok Puraskar, 5 Bollywood Movie Awards, 9 International Indian Film Academy Awards, 11 Producers Guild Film Awards, 10 Screen Awards, 6 Stardust Awards, and 10 Zee Cine Awards.

== Legacy ==
Black has featured in several listings. In 2005, Richard Corliss of Time included it in "Best Movies of 2005", peaking at #5. He wrote, "In so many Indian films the deepest searches are for romantic ecstasy and for reconciliation with the father figure. By addressing both these needs, Black is more than a noble weepie; it is the ultimate Bollywood love story." The same year, it ranked #1 in Rachna Kanwar's The Times of India's "25 Must See Bollywood Movies", who stated that it was "made with astounding sensitivity and enthralling quest for perfection". In 2017, cultural professor Rachel Dwyer featured it in "70 Iconic Movies of Independent India", and in 2018, Lata Jha of Mint featured it in "10 Unusual Indian Film Takes on Disability". Time Out placed the film at 80th position in its "The 100 best Bollywood movies" list.

Mukerji's performance has been noted as one of her notable works, and it was referenced in several films. In Golmaal: Fun Unlimited, a 2006 comedy by Rohit Shetty, actor Arshad Warsi dressed up as Mukerji's character. In 2010, Filmfare included her work in their listing of Indian cinema's "80 Iconic Performances", and wrote, "... Mukerji sure filled the silences with her stupendous presence and how. Mukerji has left an indelible mark with this role that usually comes once in a lifetime for most." In its March 2016 issue, New Woman magazine asserted: "It is hard to forget Mukerji ... essaying the role of a speech-impaired, deaf and blind girl with little or no make-up ... This was once when her action spoke louder than words."

Black was remade in Turkish as Benim Dünyam (2013), which generated controversy in the media. On 5 September, when TMC Films released its trailer, Bhansali sent e-mails to the production company as no remake rights had been purchased, but they did not provide any response. The remake opened on 25 October 2013 to positive reviews from critics.

In February 2024, Black was made available for streaming on Netflix, to mark its 19th anniversary.

== See also ==
- List of films featuring the deaf and hard of hearing
