= Parineeta (2005 film) =

2005 Indian film by Pradeep Sarkar

- Theatrical release poster
- Directed by: Pradeep Sarkar
- Written by: Story Adaptation & Screenplay: Vidhu Vinod Chopra; Pradeep Sarkar; Arnav Chakravarti; Dialogues: Rekha Nigam
- Story by: Sarat Chandra Chattopadhyay
- Based on: Parineeta by Sarat Chandra Chattopadhyay
- Produced by: Vidhu Vinod Chopra
- Starring: Sanjay Dutt; Saif Ali Khan; Vidya Balan; Dia Mirza; Raima Sen; Sabyasachi Chakrabarty
- Cinematography: Natty Subramaniam
- Edited by: Hemanti Sarkar; Nitish Sharma
- Music by: Shantanu Moitra
- Production companies: UTV Motion Pictures; Vinod Chopra Films
- Release date: 10 June 2005
- Running time: 130 minutes
- Country: India
- Language: Hindi
- Box office: ₹32.63 crore

Parineeta (transl. The Married Woman) is a 2005 Indian Hindi-language musical romance film adaptation of Sarat Chandra Chattopadhyay's 1914 Bengali novel of the same name. Directed by debutant Pradeep Sarkar, it was based on a screenplay by the film's producer, Vidhu Vinod Chopra. The film stars Sanjay Dutt, Saif Ali Khan, and Vidya Balan (in her Bollywood debut) in lead roles, with Raima Sen, Sabyasachi Chakrabarty and Dia Mirza in supporting roles. The film has several notable allusions to Indian literature and cinema.

Parineeta primarily revolves around the lead characters, Lalita and Shekhar. Since childhood, Shekhar and Lalita have been friends and slowly this friendship blossoms into love. A series of misunderstandings surface and they are separated due to the conniving schemes of Shekhar's father. The plot deepens with the arrival of Girish, who supports Lalita's family. Eventually, Shekhar's love defies his father's greed and he seeks out Lalita.

Parineeta was released on 10 June 2005, and despite pre-release inhibitions, it proved to be a commercial success at the box office, grossing ₹32.63 crore worldwide. It received positive reviews upon release, with praise for its screenplay, soundtrack, production design, costumes and performances of the cast; however its pacing and climax received criticism. It was showcased at several international film festivals.

At the 53rd National Film Awards, Parineeta won Best Debut Film of a Director (Sarkar). At the 51st Filmfare Awards, the film received a leading 13 nominations, including Best Film, Best Director (Sarkar), Best Actor (Khan), Best Actress (Balan), and Best Supporting Actor (Dutt), and won 4 awards, including Best Female Debut (Balan).

== Plot ==
The story takes place in 1962 in Kolkata. As the credits roll, scenes from erstwhile Calcutta are displayed along with the narrator's (Amitabh Bachchan) introduction to the era. On the night of his arranged marriage to Gayatri Tantiya, (the daughter of one of his father Navinchandra Rai's business connections), Shekhar has images of his childhood friend, Lalita, calling him by his name flashing through his mind.

Meanwhile, downstairs, musical celebrations begin as Shekhar meets Vasundhara, a widow from his neighbourhood, who is thankful to her son-in-law, Girish (Sanjay Dutt), for supporting their family after the death of her husband, Gurcharan. Lalita, who is present there, playfully confronts Shekhar as to why he is being indifferent to her. Shekhar, believing she is married to Girish, admonishes her for speaking so in spite of being married.

An angry Shekhar comes back home to play a favourite tune from the past on his piano. The flashback shows a young Shekhar playing Rabindranath Tagore’s tune on his piano while young Lalita and Koel are around. Lalita, with her parents having died in a car accident, lives with Gurcharan’s family. Koel is her cousin whereas Charu is her neighbour. As this scene flashes across Shekhar’s mind, he sings a song full of sadness and loss. As time flies, they grow up to become close friends. The rebellious and musically inclined Shekhar spends his days playing the music of Rabindranath Tagore or Elvis Presley and composing his own songs with Lalita rather than becoming part of his shrewd father's business. Part of this rebellion involves resistance to meeting Gayatri Tantiya, the beautiful but devious daughter of a wealthy industrialist, whom his father would like Shekhar to marry. Meanwhile, Girish, a steel tycoon from London, makes a dramatic entry into Charu’s house. Girish seems smitten by Lalita while Koel is by Girish. Shekhar is visibly jealous of Lalita’s close friendship with Girish.

One day, a shocked Lalita, who is employed at the office of Navinchandra Rai, stumbles upon a project to refurbish and sell Gurcharan’s ancestral haveli (palatial house) as a hotel. On an earlier occasion, Gurcharan had borrowed money from Rai after leaving his haveli as collateral to him. She understands that if the money is not repaid in a few months, Rai would take over the property. She immediately thinks of asking Shekhar for monetary help. Circumstances prevent this, and Girish, upon realising this, alleviates their problem by making Gurcharan his business partner. Gurcharan repays the debt and the turn of events prompts Shekhar to think why Lalita chose to ask Girish for money instead of him. On one auspicious night, Shekhar and Lalita exchange garlands and consummate their "marriage" unbeknownst to anyone else.

While Shekhar is off to Darjeeling on a business trip, Rai violently thunders at Lalita about the loss of his hotel project, embarrassing and humiliating her. Rai gets a wall built between his and Gurcharan's house symbolising the end of their association. Unable to digest this, Gurcharan suffers a heart attack while Shekhar's mother, Rajeshwari, also falls ill. Upon Shekhar's return, Rai informs him of the ill-health of Rajeshwari and Gurcharan and then viciously poisons his mind about Lalita and indicates that Lalita married Girish for his money. Shekhar is disgusted to hear of the marriage and in his anger he hits Lalita, while humiliating her like his father had done. Meanwhile, Girish assists Gurcharan's family and takes them to London to allow for better care and treatment for Gurcharan’s heart. Gurcharan eventually dies anyway and upon the family's return from London, Shekhar assumes that Girish and Lalita are married and agrees to marry Gayatri.

The film returns to the night of Shekhar's marriage when Girish hands him the ownership papers of Gurcharan's haveli. He shocks Shekhar by telling him that he married Koel because Lalita rejected his marriage proposal. Shekhar confronts Rai over the ownership papers and for poisoning his mind against Lalita, while revealing he is already "married" to her. He then symbolically breaks down the wall separating the two families and brings Lalita to his home as his bride, so much to the delight of Rajeshwari.

== Cast ==
- Sanjay Dutt as Girish Sharma. A simple and straightforward businessman who plays Lalita's moral support with warmth and compassion.
- Saif Ali Khan as Shekhar Rai. Shows a balance of love for Lalita and jealousy towards Girish. He is a passionate musician. Towards the end his utter hatred for himself transforms him into a cold and bitter person.
- Vidya Balan as Lalita. A woman of dignity with unflinching love for Shekhar. A lovely singer, who resigned to circumstances, upholding her respect when she faces insult.
  - Tina Datta as Lalita in her teens.
- Raima Sen as Koel. Lalita's cheerful cousin.
- Dia Mirza as Gayatri Tantiya. A socialite who lures Shekhar with her charm and beauty.
- Achyut Potdar as Gurcharan.
- Sabyasachi Chakrabarty as Navinchandra Rai. Sshrewd and a conniving businessman.
- Surinder Kaur as Rajeshwari Rai. The mother of Shekhar.
- Kumkum Bhattacharya as Vasundhara Roy.
- Oindrila Saha as Vasundhara's granddaughter.
- Suman Banerjee as Lalita's sister's husband
- Boni Mukherjee as Vasundhara's daughter
- Supriya Shukla as Sunita
- Gita Dey as Shekhar's grandmother.
- Ninad Kamat as Ajit
- Haradhan Banerjee as Chatterjee
- Rekha in a special appearance in the song "Kaisi Paheli Zindagaani"
- Rita Ganguly in a special appearance in the song "Dhinak Dhinak Dha"
- George Baker as Sir William Eckhart
- Kharaj Mukherjee as Singer in Recording Studio
- Ratan Sarkhel
- Ratri Ghatak

== Production ==
=== The key elements ===
Before Parineeta, Pradeep Sarkar was a well-known personality in the area of advertisements. With 17 years in mainstream advertising and 7 years of advertisement film-making and commercial cinema, he completed about 1000 commercials and 15 music videos. Vidhu Vinod Chopra, the producer, took notice of his music videos and contacted Sarkar to direct some of the music videos of the film Mission Kashmir (2000). After carving a niche in filming music videos, Sarkar gave the thought of filming Parineeta to Chopra. There began the making of the film.

About the film's comparison with the novel, Chopra said in an interview that, as compared to its 1953 namesake film by Bimal Roy, the story was based in the year 1962. He said that it took them one and a half years to script the film, with them adding new characters and emphasizing under-represented characters from the novel. In a separate interview, Chopra admitted that he was actively involved with the screenplay because the film was an adaptation of the novel. When speaking about cinematic adaptation, Chopra gave due credit to Sarkar, and Natty Subramaniam (the film's cinematographer), for providing the vintage visuals. Saif Ali Khan once said that the film was initially attempted to be made in a contemporary way. When the film's crew did not find the depiction appealing, the filming began with the 60s look.

Chopra once cited an interesting anecdote about his belief in Sarkar's film-making abilities. He said that he never personally signed the cheques for the film's expenditure. He transferred money into Sarkar's bank account and the cheques were eventually signed by Sarkar and his spouse.

=== Casting ===
Chopra said in an interview that Saif Ali Khan and Vidya Balan were not the first choices for the lead roles in Parineeta. In fact, Abhishek Bachchan was being cast as Shekhar and Saif Ali Khan as Girish. However Abhishek walked out of the project and Saif readily was accepted as a replacement. This fact was corroborated by Saif in an interview when he said that even though Sarkar had faith in his abilities, Chopra was not too keen on having him. Akshaye Khanna was also offered Shekhar Rai's role, but he refused—a decision he later regretted.^{[38]}

The choice of Vidya Balan came with Sarkar's prior work experience with her in three music videos. Chopra said that Vidya was screen-tested for six months and only then they were sure of her acting abilities. Saif once said that he was not convinced of Vidya's abilities, since Parineeta was to be her first film. He instead hoped to work with established actresses like Aishwarya Rai or Rani Mukherjee. However, after seeing Vidya portray the character of Lalita, he was thoroughly appreciative of her performance. Getting an opportunity to debut with big names from the industry along with a lovely character to portray made Vidya accept the role of Lalita.

The choice of Sanjay Dutt was because of his versatility, said Chopra in an interview. He also said that the affable nature of Sanjay was a plus during film making.

Sreelekha Mitra was approached to portray the role of Gayatri but she refused due to her pregnancy. The role then went to Dia Mirza who liked the script so well that she chose to play the role in spite of it being small. Raima Sen had a similar story with her want to work with the duo of Chopra and Sarkar. The cameo of the veteran actress, Rekha was purely out of her interest in the song, "Kaisi Paheli Zindgani".

=== Filming and music ===
Since Sarkar knew the city of Kolkata very well, the film was primarily shot there. While most of the film was made in Kolkata, a small portion was shot in Darjeeling.

To re-create the 60s era, lot of efforts were made by the producers. For instance, Chopra said that it cost them money and difficulty to procure the green coloured car which was driven by Shekhar in the film. Chopra confirmed the authenticity of the piano used in the song "Piyu Bole", and of the toy train used in the song "Kasto Mazza". About the look of the characters, Mirza said that the 60s look was well captured by the make-up artist, Vidyadar. The song "Kaisi Paheli Zindagani" was based on the tune to Louis Armstrong's "A Kiss to Build a Dream on".

Critics had high expectations from Parineeta's music because of the award-winning music that was provided in some of Chopra's previous films, such as 1942: A Love Story (1994) and Mission Kashmir (2000). Shantanu Moitra, Parineeta's music director composed hundreds of tunes before six of them got finalised after a year's effort. After finalizing the soundtrack, Chopra was appreciative of the musician's abilities when he said that Moitra has the potential to become another R. D. Burman, a yesteryear Bollywood music director.

== Reception ==
=== Box-office and ratings ===
Parineeta collected over Rs 170 million in India at the end of 2005. Its overseas success was notable as well with gross collections of Rs. 36 million in the United Kingdom, Rs. 35 million in North America, and Rs 15 million in the rest of the overseas.

=== Reviews, critiques and controversies ===
Before its release on 10 June 2005, Subhash K. Jha in a preview wondered how the film would fare at the box office. Citing comparisons with the 1953 version, the preview suggested that debutant director, Sarkar's inexperience in film-making, the probable inability of debutant actress, Balan to portray Lalita's character appropriately, suitable 1960s depiction by contemporary actors and musician, Shantanu Moitra's until-then unimpressive soundtracks, could be impediments to a successful adaptation.

Post-release, the same critic said, "Vidhu Vinod Chopra's "Parineeta" – a remake of an old classic of the same name...(had) the love story (which) was received well by the younger generation and it went on to become the biggest hit of the year." Dinesh Raheja of Rediff.com termed the film as "...a beautiful story, beautifully told. It approximates what most of us expect, and increasingly yearn for, in vain, our cinematic experience."

3000 copies of the novella were sold within weeks of the film's release, owing to the film's good reception.

Derek Elley of Variety wrote, "A character-driven meller that's a treat for the eyes, with performances to match, "Parineeta" is high-end Bollywood near its best". He also says that, "though the climax is still emotionally powerful, it comes over as overcooked." A mixed review from Mid-Day says "Pradeep Sarkar weaves the story like magic, especially in the first half ... excelling in the detailing ... the vintage look of the film (that stood out) with authentic costumes, props and the roads of Kolkata". However, the review criticised the film's climax terming it as amateur, thereby diluting the whole film's impact. Another such review came from The Hindu which begins by saying "A simple enough story, but Sarkar tells it well, with some great shots of Shekhar and Lalita together." The review eventually says "Except for the end ... where it is too much to bear."

The issue of piracy cropped up when a news article published in The Indian Express exposed the dark side of the film market. Hardly into weeks of the film's release, CDs were being sold at as low as Rs. 40. Another blemish was that Soumitra Dasgupta, a writer and close associate of Sarkar alleged that the film's story had a striking resemblance to his parallel work on the novella.

== Screenings ==
In 2005, Parineeta's cast got a red carpet walk when it was the "World Premiere Film" at the International Indian Film Awards (IIFA) weekend in Amsterdam. Owing to this European premiere, Sarkar said that the film had a great opening in the American and English box-offices. The film was on the UK Top Ten films for four consecutive weeks.

The film was chosen among 15 debut works for the 2006 Berlin Film Festival. It received enthusiastic reception from the audience as it ran to packed houses to the Chopra's surprise. Expecting an audience of about 100 Westerners, a critic visiting the festival was surprised to see the cinema hall full and people jostling for seats even on the steps.

At the 24th Annual Minneapolis-St. Paul International Film Festival held in April 2006, Parineeta was the only Indian mainstream cinema to feature among 135 films from 40 countries.

In 2006, the film featured in the Palm Springs International Film Festival, 24th San Francisco International Asian American Film Festival, Indian Film Festival of Los Angeles, Helsinki Film Festival and the International Film Festival of Marrakech.

== Awards ==
At the 53rd National Film Awards, Sarkar won the Indira Gandhi Award for Best Debut Film of a Director.

51st Filmfare Awards:

Won

- Best Female Debut – Vidya Balan
- R. D. Burman Award – Shantanu Moitra
- Best Choreography – Howard Rosemeyer for "Kaisi Paheli"
- Best Art Direction – Keshto Mandal, Pradeep Sarkar and Tanushree Sarkar
- Best Sound Design – Bishwadeep Chatterjee

Nominated

- Best Film – Vidhu Vinod Chopra
- Best Director – Pradeep Sarkar
- Best Actor – Saif Ali Khan
- Best Actress – Vidya Balan
- Best Supporting Actor – Sanjay Dutt
- Best Music Director – Shantanu Moitra
- Best Lyricist – Swanand Kirkire for "Piyu Bole"
- Best Male Playback Singer – Sonu Nigam for "Piyu Bole"
- Best Female Playback Singer – Shreya Ghoshal for "Piyu Bole"
- Best Female Playback Singer – Sunidhi Chauhan for "Kaisi Paheli"

== Home media ==
The first version of the DVD version of Parineeta was released by UTV Motion Pictures on 30 October 2006. It has subtitle options in English, Arabic, Spanish, German, Italian, Malay, and French. An additional disc includes interviews with the actors and a behind the scenes look at the making of the film. It is available in 16:9 Anamorphic widescreen, Dolby Digital 5.1 Surround, progressive 24 FPS, widescreen and NTSC format.

== Soundtrack ==
Parineeta

Soundtrack album by Shantanu Moitra
- Released: 10 April 2005
- Genre: Feature film soundtrack
- Length: 7:29
- Language: Hindi
- Labels: Tips Music (2005-2018); Zee Music Company (2018-present)
- Producer: Shantanu Moitra

Shantanu Moitra chronology
Hazaaron Khwaishein Aisi (2005)	Parineeta (2005)	Yahaan (2005)

The soundtrack to Parineeta was released by Tips Music in 10 April 2005. It received positive reviews, with a reviewer stating, "praising the soundtrack of Parineeta leaves you at a loss for superlatives. In each song, the trend was great singing, great composition, and great lyrics". It was later re-released by Zee Music Company in 2018. Shantanu Moitra composed the music and Lyrics were penned by Swanand Kirkire.

Vocals were supplied by Sonu Nigam (for Khan), Shreya Ghoshal (for Balan) and Sunidhi Chauhan (for Rekha), with Rita Ganguly and K. S. Chithra.

No.	Title	Singer(s)	Length
1.	"Piyu Bole"	Sonu Nigam, Shreya Ghoshal	4:21
2.	"Kasto Mazza"	Sonu Nigam, Shreya Ghoshal	4:43
3.	"Kaisi Paheli Zindagani"	Sunidhi Chauhan	4:03
4.	"Soona Man Ka Aangan"	Sonu Nigam, Shreya Ghoshal	4:20
5.	"Raat Hamari Toh"	K. S. Chithra, Swanand Kirkire	5:19
6.	"Dhinak Dhinak Dha"	Rita Ganguly	3:53
7.	"Hui Main Parineeta"	Sonu Nigam, Shreya Ghoshal	2:23
