= Amod Mehra =

Indian trade analyst and film journalist

Amod Mehra is an Indian trade analyst and film journalist. His work and commentary on Bollywood movies has been featured in such Indian news outlets and newspapers as The Times of India, Hindustan Times, NDTV, and MiD DAY. Some major foreign media outlets, such as BBC News and The New York Times, have also quoted Mehra.
