= Ayesha Kapur =

Indian-German actress (born 1994)

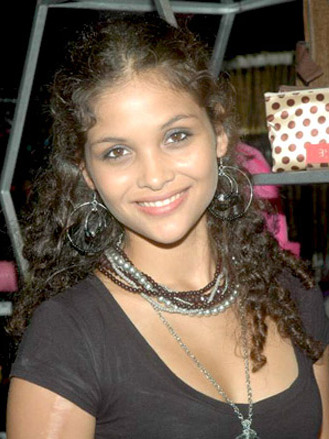
- Kapur in 2012
- Born: Ayesha Giulia Kapur; 13 September 1994 (age 32); Düsseldorf, Germany
- Occupation: Actress
- Years active: 2005–2009, 2023–present

Ayesha Giulia Kapur (born 13 September 1994) is an Indian-German actress, who is best known from the Bollywood movie Black. Kapur became the recipient of many awards in the "Best Supporting Actress" category. In doing so, she became the second youngest (behind Darsheel Safary) to be both nominated and win a Filmfare Award and is currently the youngest person ever to win a Zee Cine Award and an IIFA Award.

== Personal life ==
Kapur grew up and resides in Auroville, Puducherry. Her mother Jacqueline is German, and her father is Punjabi businessman Dilip Kapur, owner of the Hidesign chain of leather goods stores. She has one brother, Milan, and two half-brothers from her father's first marriage, Akash and Vikas. She grew up speaking English, German and Tamil, and also speaks Hindi. Kapur finished her schooling at Deerfield Academy and graduated from Columbia University in 2020.

== Career ==
Kapur starred in her first major role in Bollywood in the 2005 movie Black, as the young Michelle McNally opposite Rani Mukerji and Amitabh Bachchan. She received praises and critical acclaim for her role. For her role, Kapur won the Filmfare Award for Best Supporting Actress (2006) at the 51st Filmfare Awards and she holds the record for the youngest nominee and winner of the award in the female category. Kapur's second movie was Sikandar in 2009 where she played the role of a young Kashmiri Muslim girl, Nasreen opposite the lead Parzan Dastur, with whom she develops a bond and becomes his conscience keeper.

Since 2010, Kapur along with her mother Jacqueline, also runs her own brand of accessories, Ayesha Accessories.

== Filmography ==
=== Films ===
Key
†	Denotes films that have not yet been released

Year	Title	Role	Notes	Ref
2005	Black	Young Michelle McNally	Bollywood Debut	
2009	Sikandar	Nasreen Banu		
2025	Hari Ka Om	Priya		

=== Web series ===
Year	Title	Role	Notes	Ref
2023	Sweet Kaaram Coffee	Julia	Tamil	

== Awards ==
Year	Award	Category	Film	Result	Ref.
2006	7th IIFA Awards	Best Supporting Actress	Black	Won	
2006	51st Filmfare Awards	Best Supporting Actress	Black	Won	
2006	9th Zee Cine Awards	Best Actor in a Supporting Role – Female	Black	Won	
2006	Bollywood Movie Awards	Best Supporting Actress	Black	Won	
2006	Producers Guild Film Awards	Best Actress in a Supporting Role	Black	Won	
2006	Screen Awards	Best Child Artist	Black	Won	
2006	Stardust Awards	Exciting New Face of the Year	Black	Won	
