= Aashiq Banaya Aapne =

2005 Indian film by Aditya Datt

- Theatrical release poster
- Directed by: Aditya Datt
- Written by: Anjaan Sagri
- Produced by: Balabhai Patel
- Starring: Emraan Hashmi; Sonu Sood; Tanushree Dutta; Navin Nischol
- Cinematography: A. K. N. Sebastian
- Edited by: Irfan Shaikh
- Music by: Himesh Reshammiya
- Distributed by: Shagun Film Creations
- Release date: 2 September 2005
- Running time: 121 minutes
- Country: India
- Language: Hindi
- Budget: ₹45 million
- Box office: ₹93 million

Aashiq Banaya Aapne (English: You Made me a Lover) is a 2005 Indian Hindi-language romantic thriller film directed by Aditya Datt. It stars Emraan Hashmi, Sonu Sood, and Tanushree Dutta (in her debut), and follows a love triangle between their characters.

The film was released on 2 September 2005 and was successful at the box office, with publications like Rediff.com considering it a surprise hit. It received praise for its soundtrack but criticism for the writing.

== Plot ==
Karan loves Sneha but is too shy to ever express his feelings to her. Although Karan's feelings are evident to many, he is content in just seeing Sneha smile and never gathers the courage to tell her how he feels. On one occasion, Karan invites Sneha to a party, where she meets the charming and mischievous Vikram ("Vicky").

Vikram, aka Vicky is Karan's childhood friend. The exact opposite of Karan, Vicky is an extrovert and a notorious flirt. All three lives change when Vicky joins Karan and Sneha in college, and Sneha begins feeling drawn towards Vicky. However, Vicky is not convinced of Sneha's feelings. To prove her love towards Vicky, Sneha decides to seduce him, and they have sex. The next morning, Sneha confesses to Vicky that she loves him, and the previous night should end Vicky's doubts once and for all.

Fearing Vicky's intentions, Karan tries to talk him out of his relationship with Sneha, but Vicky assures him that this time he really is in love and not flirting. Karan feels he has lost the only woman he has ever loved but knows he cannot do anything about it. However, life goes on and the three of them share a special bond of friendship. Vicky also tries to help Karan with his love life by setting him up with another college friend, Chandni.

Everything seems to be going well between the two, but one night's incident, where Vicky is caught cheating with Chandni, leads to Karan breaking up with her. Things change, trust is broken, obsession and confusion ensue, and Sneha is heartbroken and taken aback. Vicky tries to talk to Sneha but Karan intervenes and fights with him. Sneha breaks them apart but takes Karan's side. Vicky parts from them but claims Sneha will always be his. One night, Sneha is left in a paranoid state after Vicky appears to call and maliciously text her, and subsequently pounds at her door and throws a rock through her window, with a message claiming Sneha as his own. Sneha then turns towards Karan for support. Vicky is later shown getting thrown in jail for possession of drugs. Over time, Karan finally musters the courage to propose to Sneha, with the approval of her father.

The night Sneha and Karan get engaged, Vicky is bailed out of jail and re-enters their lives, bringing Chandni along with him. Vicky gets Karan to confess the truth to Sneha of what really happened. It turns out that Karan could never get over liking Sneha, nor his jealousy towards Vicky. After walking in on them, Karan decides to have Vicky entirely removed from both their lives and begins to frame him in order to win Sneha's trust. It is revealed that Vicky was drugged and then seduced by Chandni at a time when Sneha would catch them together. Karan later steals Vicky's phone and harasses Sneha with it, and goes on to pound on her door and throw a rock through her window, in a similar way as Vicky had done before. Knowing that Vicky kept drugs for a friend, Karan tips off the police to have him arrested.

Sneha is shocked and horrified at Karan's misdeeds, saying that she now hates him. Karan then attempts suicide by holding a gun to his head. As Vicky and Sneha try to stop him, Karan fires a shot in Vicky's direction but instead kills Chandni. Vicky and Karan engage in a bloody fight which ends with the two and Sneha severely wounded and unconscious. All three are hospitalized as authorities investigate all the incidents. In the end, Karan is arrested for Chandni's murder but apologizes to Sneha and wishes her all the best. Sneha later reconciles with Vicky and they both profess their love for each other.

== Cast ==
- Emraan Hashmi as Vikram "Vicky" Mathur
- Sonu Sood as Karan Oberoi
- Tanushree Dutta as Sneha Pariyar
- Ashwini Kalsekar as Detective Nethra
- Vivek Vaswani as Karan's uncle
- Zabyn Khan as Chandni
- Preeti Ganguly as Karan's aunt
- Navin Nischol as Sneha's father
- Himesh Reshammiya in special appearance in the song "Aashiq Banaya Aapne (Remix)" in end credits

== Soundtrack ==
Aashiq Banaya Aapne

Soundtrack album by Himesh Reshammiya
- Released: 29 July 2005
- Recorded: 2005
- Genre: Feature film soundtrack
- Language: Hindi
- Producer: Himesh Reshammiya

Himesh Reshammiya chronology
Iqbal (2005)	Aashiq Banaya Aapne (2005)	Koi Aap Sa (2005)

The soundtrack album marked the debut for Himesh Reshammiya as a singer in Bollywood. According to the Indian trade website Box Office India, the album sold approximately 2,000,000 units. The song "Aashiq Banaya Aapne" was later re-composed for the film Hate Story 4, sung by Reshammiya and Neha Kakkar.

All lyrics are written by Sameer Anjaan; all music is composed by Himesh Reshammiya.

Track listing
No.	Title	Singer(s)	Length
1.	"Aashiq Banaya Aapne"	Himesh Reshammiya and Shreya Ghoshal	6:04
2.	"Mar Jaawan Mit Jaawan"	Abhijeet Sawant and Sunidhi Chauhan	4:28
3.	"Aap Ki Kashish"	Himesh Reshammiya, Krishna Beura and Ahir	5:33
4.	"Dil Nashin Dil Nashin"	KK	6:32
5.	"Dillagi Mein Jo Beet Jaaye"	Sonu Nigam, Shaan, Himesh Reshammiya, Jayesh Gandhi and Vasundhara Das	4:14
6.	"Aashiq Banaya Aapne" (Remix)	Himesh Reshammiya	4:32
7.	"Dil Nashin Dil Nashin" (remix)	KK	4:32
8.	"Aap Ki Kashish" (remix)	Himesh Reshammiya and Ahir	4:41

== Reception ==
Ziya Us Salam, reviewing for The Hindu, wrote that Emraan Hashmi performs "with such mechanical ease that one would be forgiven for believing that a robot was at work". Rediff.com termed the story as being 'as old as the hills'. Giving it one star out of five, Taran Adarsh for Bollywood Hungama wrote that the film "looks like a collage of scenes, assembled in a film that abounds in mediocrity".
