= Hazaaron Khwaishein Aisi =

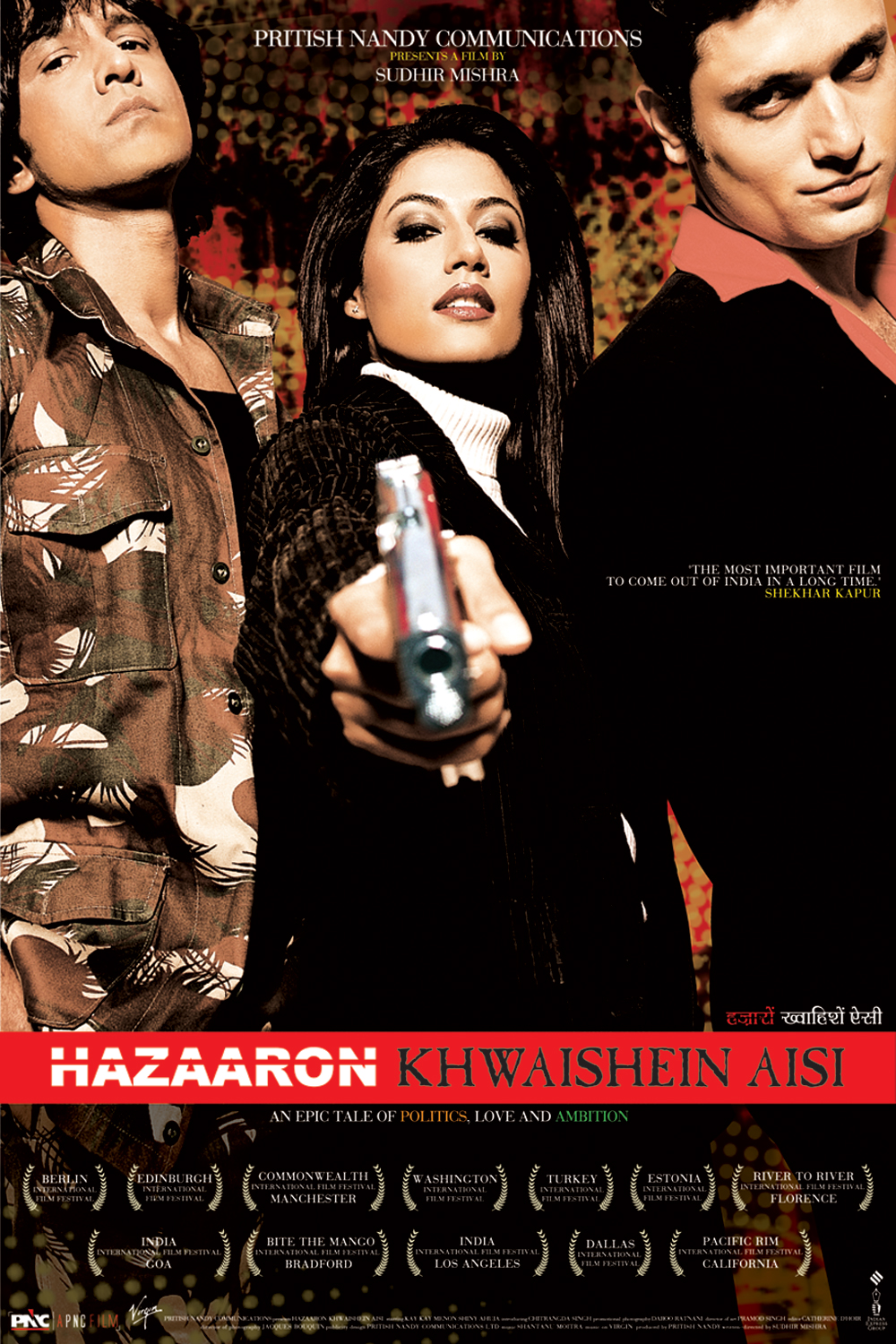
- Theatrical release poster
- Directed by: Sudhir Mishra
- Written by: Ruchi Narain; Sudhir Mishra; Shiv Kumar Subramaniam; Sanjay Chauhan (Hindi dialogues)
- Produced by: Rangita Pritish Nandy
- Starring: Kay Kay Menon; Chitrangada Singh; Shiney Ahuja; Saurabh Shukla; Ram Kapoor
- Cinematography: Ravi K. Chandran
- Edited by: Catherine D'Hoir
- Music by: Shantanu Moitra
- Release dates: December 2003 (Florence River to River Festival); 15 April 2005
- Country: India
- Languages: Hindi; English

Hazaaron Khwaishein Aisi (transl. A Thousand Wishes Like This) is a 2003 Indian political drama film directed by Sudhir Mishra. The film was shot in 2003 but wasn't released until 2005. Set against the backdrop of the Indian Emergency, the movie tells the story of three young people in the 1970s, when India was undergoing massive social and political changes. The title is taken from a poem by Urdu poet Mirza Ghalib.

It went to 12 film festivals in 6 months in various locations including Turkey, Estonia, River to River (Florence), Berlin, Edinburgh, Washington, Goa, Bite The Mango (Bradford), Commonwealth (Manchester), India (Los Angeles), Dallas, and Pacific Rim (California).

== Plot ==
The film opens at Hindu College, Delhi, with the story of three students, Siddharth Tyabji, Geeta Rao, and Vikram Malhotra.

Siddharth is a driven revolutionary who dreams of bringing a revolution in the state of Bihar that will end the caste-based discrimination there, bringing social justice, and improving society. Geeta is a London-returned South Indian in love with the firebrand Siddharth. She has led a very sheltered life and is yet to explore the terrain of the Indian socio-political landscape. While she finds Siddharth's Naxalite rhetoric attractive, she is not sure if she can wholeheartedly subscribe to it. Every time they come to a choice, Siddharth chooses his ideology over his love for her, breaking her heart time and again. Vikram is a middle-class boy who dreams of making it big, whatever the cost. He is particularly afflicted by his father's Gandhian ideas but irritated and frustrated at the same time, seeing his father's way of life as ineffective in bringing about change.

Siddharth leaves for Bihar to bring about a revolution; Geeta leaves for Oxford to get a degree; and Vikram sets up an office in Delhi.

A few years later, Vikram is a fixer in the power corridors of government, Geeta is married to promising IAS Officer Arun Mehta, who, as Geeta says, "has it all," and Siddharth is still trying to foment a revolution. But all is not as it seems. Below the mask of happiness, each person is quite unhappy. Vikram has'made it' but he cannot get Geeta, the love of his life. Geeta is married, but she meets Siddharth on the sly, cheating on her husband.

Geeta gets a divorce from her husband because of her love for Siddharth, even though she does not want to hurt her husband's feelings. Geeta joins Siddharth in the village and starts to teach the children, while the police repeatedly try to hunt down her now husband, Siddharth. She bears a child with Siddharth, whom she sends to her parents in London since she believes he deserves more than to grow up in the remote village.

Eventually the police round up the entire village, capturing Siddharth and Geeta for intent to cause unrest and brutally assaulting them – fabricating a story of a villagers' riot to explain their injuries. Geeta is bailed out of prison by her now influential ex-husband. Siddharth, on the run, is shot by the police, admitted to a local hospital, and placed under arrest while Geeta believes him to have been killed.

Vikram, who has been consoling Geeta and taking care of her during the absences of her ex-husband and of Siddharth, is informed that Siddharth is alive. Vikram travels to meet Siddharth and release him using his influential contacts. However, he has an accident on the way and is admitted to the same hospital as Siddharth. During the night, local Naxalites break into the crude hospital and free Siddharth while Vikram lays there. The next morning, the policemen in charge of guarding Siddharth, frustrated, accused Vikram of conspiring to free Siddharth and beat him up. After discovering that he is a man of influence, they resolve to kill him and dump his body to make it unrecognisable. Vikram, terrified and injured, attempts to escape but is chased down. The policemen find that the Naxalites have emptied their revolver, and they beat Vikram. Soon, the police chief and a local politician come looking for Vikram and are able to stop the policemen from killing him.

Vikram suffers severe brain damage and is rendered mentally challenged, while Siddharth tells Geeta that he intends to leave. Geeta refuses to accompany him. Siddharth has moved beyond simply trying to foment a revolution. He is prepared to delay it because he feels that the people are not ready in spite of their saying otherwise. He goes to London to study medicine and, through a letter, voices his anguish and disillusion with the idea of revolution, writing "I hope the mysteries of the human body will be less confusing" (in reference to his studying medicine and quitting the revolution).

The last scene shows Geeta working in the village and taking care of the handicapped Vikram, who can no longer speak. The movie ends with Vikram writing, "I love you, Geeta," on a rock as they sit by a placid lake and watch the sunset.

== Cast ==
- Kay Kay Menon as Siddharth Tyabji
- Chitrangada Singh as Geeta Rao
- Shiney Ahuja as Vikram Malhotra
- Ram Kapoor as Arun Mehta
- Yashpal Sharma as Randhir Singh
- Akhil Mishra as Vikram's father
- Saurabh Shukla as Bihari constable
- Gajraj Rao as Bihari constable
- Anupam Shyam as Jhanda Singh
- Shilpa Shukla as Neeti
- Satyajit Sharma as Maharaja's elder son
- Sanjay Singh as Sanjay Singh
- Arif Zakaria as Daryll
- V K Sharma as Maharaja's Secretary
- Yusuf Hussain as Senior Politician

== Music ==
1. "Baawra Mann Dekhne Chala Ek Sapna" – Swanand Kirkire
2. "Bor Bayi Na Aaye Piya" – Shobha Joshi
3. "Hey Sajni" – Bhikhari Thakur
4. "Banvara Mann Dekhne Chala Ek Sapna" – Shubha Mudgal
5. "Hajaro Khwahishe Aisee Ke" – Shubha Mudgal
6. "Hazaaro Khwaishe Aisi (2)" – Shubha Mudgal
7. "He Sajni The (Club Mix)" – Bhikhari Thakur
8. "Mann Yeh Baavra" – Swanand Kirkire, Ajay Jhingran

== Critical reception ==
The film received positive reviews. The Hindu described it as a real reel from India. Avijit Ghosh of The Telegraph called it a "post-dated love letter to that lost generation." Sukanya Verma of Rediff said, "Sudhir Mishra's drama is overwhelming, memorable." Anupama Chopra of India Today called it a "finely crafted, textured film."
