= List of Bhojpuri songs recorded by Shreya Ghoshal =

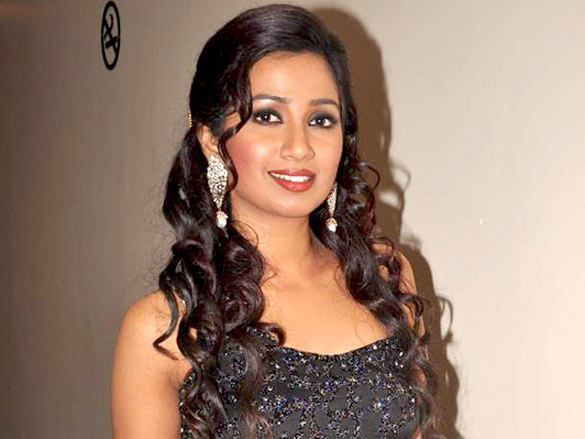
Ghoshal on the sets of X Factor India, 2011

Shreya Ghoshal (born 12 March 1984) is an Indian playback singer. She sings in Hindi, Tamil, Telugu, Malayalam, Kannada, Marathi, Gujarati, Bengali, Assamese, Nepali, Oriya, Bhojpuri, Punjabi and Tulu languages. She sang more than 81 songs in Bhojpuri.

Here is the list of songs recorded by Shreya Ghoshal in the Bhojpuri language :-

== List of Bhojpuri film songs ==
She sang more than 81 songs in Bhojpuri .

=== 2003 ===
Film	Song	Composer(s)	Writer(s)	Co-singer(s)
Bhaiyaa Hamaar	"Baitha Aa Gachhiyaa Ke Chaav"	Dhananjay Mishra	Vinay Bihari	Vinod Rathod
Bhaiyaa Hamaar	"Mohabbat Ke Aisan Asar Ho Gaiil"	Dhananjay Mishra	Vinay Bihari	Manoj Tiwari
Chhaila Babu	"Humke Tohra Pe Ba Aitbar Babua"	Shekhar Sharma	Rakesh, Krishna Pandey	Udit Narayan
Chhaila Babu	"Rahi-Rahi Maske Dono Jobanva"	Shekhar Sharma	Rakesh, Krishna Pandey	Udit Narayan
Daamaad Ji	"Bhola Baba Aaiil Teej Tyohar"	Lal Sinha	Vinay Bihari	
Daamaad Ji	"Pavan Purvaiyya Peeritiya Ke Arjee"	Lal Sinha	Vinay Bihari	Manoj Tiwari
Daamaad Ji	"Tohra Se Door Rahlee Dukhwa Hazaar"	Lal Sinha	Vinay Bihari	Udit Narayan
Gaon Aaja Pardesi	"Humse Door Door Jaye Ke Na"	Ravindra Jain	Ravindra Jain	Shaan
Gaon Aaja Pardesi	"Unko Puj Puj Ke Devta"	Ravindra Jain	Ravindra Jain	
Sasur Bada Payisawala	"Bhola Hamse Imtihan Le Lee"	Lal Sinha	Vinay Bihari	Pradeep Pandit
Sasur Bada Payisawala	"Jaan Se Badke Hum Tohra Ke Jaanile"	Lal Sinha	Vinay Bihari	Udit Narayan
Sasur Bada Payisawala	"Tohra Bin Jee Naa Sakilen"	Lal Sinha	Vinay Bihari	Manoj Tiwari
Maai Re Kar De Bidaai Hamaar	"Khali Dehiya Rahiil"	Rajesh Prasad	S. Kumar, Poonam Bhatia	
Tu Hamaar Hau	"Pyar Mein Har Baar Dil" (Version 1)	Nikhil-Vinay	Fanindra Rao	Udit Narayan
Tu Hamaar Hau	"Pyar Mein Har Baar Dil" (Version 2)	Nikhil-Vinay	Fanindra Rao	Udit Narayan
Tu Hamaar Hau	"Tohara Mathe Ki Bindiya"	Nikhil-Vinay	Fanindra Rao	Udit Narayan
Dharti Putra	"Kehu Aai Pardesi Hamse Pyar Karela"	Lal Sinha	Vinay Bihari	
Bandhan Toote Naa	"Kahela Bagwala"	Dhananjay Mishra	Vinay Bihari	Udit Narayan
Dulha Babu	"Ankhiya Se Lor Bahe"	Durga-Natraj	Vinay Bihari	Soham Chakraborty
Dulha Babu	"Jay Jay Gharwali" (Aarti)	Durga-Natraj	Vinay Bihari	Udit Narayan
Humri Bhi Aavegi Barat	"Tala Khol De Ho"	Nikhil-Vinay	Vinay Bihari	Udit Narayan
Kanhaiya	"Asha Ke Bhor Aayl"	Ashok Ghayal	Ashok Ghayal	Udit Narayan
Kanhaiya	"Saiyan Dharkela Di"	Ashok Ghayal	Ashok Ghayal	Udit Narayan
Kab Hoi Gavna Hamaar	"Sagar Biche Swarg Se Sunder"	Nikhil-Vinay	Vinay Bihari	Khushboo Jain, Anuradha Paudwal
Zulmi Sung Akhiyan Lari	"Jiyera Khushi Se"	Vinay Panwari	Kukku Prakash	Udit Narayan
Ssggs	"Sath Humra Chod Ke" (Sad Version)	Vinay Panwari	Kukku Prakash	Himakshi
	"Chan Dekhi Ke"	Vinay Panwari	Kukku Prakash	Vardan

=== 2004 ===
Film	Song	Composer(s)	Writer(s)	Co-singer(s)
Panditji Batai Na Biyaah Kab Hoi	"Panditji Batai Na Biyaah Kab Hoi"	Rajesh Gupta	Vinay Bihari	Poornima, Anand Mohan
Panditji Batai Na Biyaah Kab Hoi	"Chumma Sae Chali Na Kaam"	Rajesh Gupta	Vinay Bihari	Poornima, Manoj Tiwari, Ravi Kishan
Naihar Ke Mado Piya Ki Chunari	"Naihar Ke Mado" (Version 1)	Saleem–Bapi	Anmol Panday	Udit Narayan
Naihar Ke Mado Piya Ki Chunari	"Chumay La Ho"	Saleem–Bapi	Anmol Panday	Kalpana Patowary, Satyendra V., Vardhan
Naihar Ke Mado Piya Ki Chunari	"Chup Chaap Hamaro"	Saleem–Bapi	Anmol Panday	Udit Narayan
Naihar Ke Mado Piya Ki Chunari	"Naihar Ke Mado" (Version 2)	Saleem–Bapi	Anmol Panday	Udit Narayan
Daroga Babu I Love You	"Daroga Babu I Love You"	Lal Sinha	Vinay Bihari	
Daroga Babu I Love You	"Bhojpuri Filmi Antakshri"	Lal Sinha	Vinay Bihari	Udit Narayan
Sasura Bada Paisawala	Sasura Bada Paisawala (Title song)	Lal Sinha		Manoj Tiwari
Sasura Bada Paisawala	Bhola Hamse Imtihan Le Lee"	Lal Sinha		Pradeep Pandit
Sasura Bada Paisawala	Jaan Se Badke Hum Tohra Ke Jaanile"	Lal Sinha		Udit Narayan

=== 2005 ===
Film	Song	Composer(s)	Writer(s)	Co-singer(s)
Dehati Babu	"Pyar Ke Har Baat Ho Gail"	Lal Sinha	Vinay Bihari, Manoj Tiwari	Udit Narayan
Firangi Dulhaniya	"Tata Safari Leke"	Chandra Bhushan Pradhan	Satish-Ajay	Ajay
Mangalsutra	"Driver Piyava Brake Mare Hachahach"	Lal Sinha	Vinay Bihari	Manoj Tiwari, Radheshyam Rasiya
Mangalsutra	"Ab Na Judai Sehle Sahai"	Lal Sinha	Vinay Bihari	Manoj Tiwari

=== 2006 ===
Film	Song	Composer(s)	Writer(s)	Co-singer(s)
Tulsi	"Pyar Ketna Kareele Hum"	Baba Jahangirdar	Vinay Bihari	Udit Narayan
Ab Ta Banja Sajanwa Hamaar	"Chori Chori Ankhiyan Milake"	Bhushan Dua	Bhushan Dua	Udit Narayan
Dulha Aesan Chaahi	"Aeeli Tohre Duari"	R. K. Arun	S. Kumar, Vinod Swapnil	
Maati Hamre Gaon Ki	"Phulwa Ke Mol"	Satish Kumar	Rajesh Mishra	Ajay
Sakhi Hum Na Jaibe Sasur Ghar Mein	"Chham Chham Baaje Mori Payaliya"	Palash Chaudhari, Nirmal Agastya	Fanindra Rao	
Raja Thakur	"Payaliya Pyar Ke Dhoon Mein Baaje"	Lal Sinha	Vinay Bihari	
Maiya Rakhihe Senurwa Abaad	"Tani Dheere Dheere Bola"	Durga-Natraj	Nawab Arzoo	Udit Narayan
Babul Pyare	"Ashiyana Preet Ke"	Gunwant Sen-Raj Sen	Mehmood Ali	Kumar Sanu
Babul Pyare	"Jabse Dilwa Ma Tohke"	Gunwant Sen-Raj Sen	Mehmood Ali	Udit Narayan
Dlihaniya Le Ke Jaib Hum	"Ankhiya Milte Hi Tohra Se"	Rajesh Gupta	Vinay Bihari	Udit Narayan
Pappu Ke Pyar Ho Gail	"Chal Kabootari"	Lal Sinha	Vipin Bahar	Manoj Tiwari

=== 2007 ===
Film	Song	Composer(s)	Writer(s)	Co-singer(s)
Deva	"Jaan Marelu Tu Hamari Ja"	Lal Sinha	Shabbir Ahmed	Manoj Tiwari
Janam Janam Ke Saath	"Suna Sajanwa Ho"	Chandra Bhushan Pradhan	Dhananjay Mishra	Udit Narayan
Janam Janam Ke Saath	"Humri Ankhiyan Mein Pyar Lahraye"	Chandra Bhushan Pradhan	Dhananjay Mishra	
Janam Janam Ke Saath	"Deepak Se Jyoti Juda Na Rahe"	Chandra Bhushan Pradhan	Dhananjay Mishra	Manoj Mishra
Shraddha	"Aankho Ko Aankho Se"	Dinesh Arjuna	Daur Saifee	Udit Narayan
Shraddha	"Tanha Tanha"	Dinesh Arjuna	Daur Saifee	
De Da Piritiya Udhaar	"Patra Dekhi Ae Baba"	Chandra Bhushan Pradhan	Pappu Srivastav	
Chhotki Dulhin	"Jaun Kehbad T Taane Maanav"	Chandra Bhushan Pradhan	Ganesh S. Pathak	
Purab	"Pyar Ke Pahila Sawan"	Lal Sinha	Vipin Bahar	
Munna Pandey Berojgaar	"Kahe Nahi Kehlu Pahile"	Chandra Bhushan Pradhan	Lal Sinha	Manoj Tiwari
Rasik Balma	"Rasik Balma"	Rajesh Gupta	Vinay Bihari	Kalpana Patowary
Rasik Balma	"Pyar Se Badhke"	Rajesh Gupta	Vinay Bihari	Udit Narayan

=== 2008 ===
Film	Song	Composer(s)	Writer(s)	Co-singer(s)
Ego Chhuma De Da Rajaji	"Ego Chhuma De Da"	Jatin Pandit	Vinay Bihari	Manoj Tiwari
Ego Chhuma De Da Rajaji	"Haath Ghumvalu"	Jatin Pandit	Vinay Bihari	Manoj Tiwari
Sab Gol Maal Ha	"Pinjada Mein Fasi Gail Bulbul"	Nikhil	Phanindar Rav	Udit Narayan
Toh Se Pyar Ba	"Dil Ki Batiya Kare"	Rajdhar-Suresh	Rajdhar-Suresh	
Toh Se Pyar Ba	"Main Jaan Gayi"	Rajdhar-Suresh	Rajdhar-Suresh	
Toh Se Pyar Ba	"Toh Se Pyar Ba"	Rajdhar-Suresh	Rajdhar-Suresh	Udit Narayan
Hum Haeen Khalnayak	"Thahre Na Dehiya Pa Dhaani Chunariya"	Dhananjay Mishra	Vinay Bihari	
Hum Haeen Khalnayak	"Kuchh Baat Ba Tohara Pyar Mein"	Dhananjay Mishra	Vinay Bihari	Udit Narayan

=== 2010 ===
Film	Song	Composer(s)	Writer(s)	Co-singer(s)
Bindaas Lageli	"Kuhu Kuhu Koyaliya"	Gunwant Sen	Mehmood Ali	Vinod Rathod

=== 2011 ===
Film	Song	Composer(s)	Writer(s)	Co-singer(s)
Deswa	"Suna Suna Tanika Sa Pyaar"	Ashutosh Singh	Ashutosh Singh	Sonu Nigam

=== 2012 ===
Film	Song	Composer(s)	Writer(s)	Co-singer(s)
Kanhaiya	"Tanik Manwa Ke Aapan Manawa"	Ashok Ghayal	Ashok Ghayal	Udit Narayan
Munna Pandey Berozgar	"Kaahe Nahin Kehlu Pahile"	Lal Sinha	Vipin Bahar	Manoj Tiwari

=== 2013 ===
Film	Song	Composer(s)	Writer(s)	Co-singer(s)
Saugandh	"Unka Se Pyar Ho Gayil"	Rajesh Gupta	Rajesh Mishra	Kalpana Patowary
Saugandh	"Meethi Meethi Chubhan"	Rajesh Gupta	Rajesh Mishra	
Tohar Kiriya	"Tohar kiriya"	Satish-Ajay	Bhushan Dua	Udit Narayan

=== 2017 ===
2017 And 2018

Film	Song	Composer(s)	Writer(s)	Co-singer(s)
Marad Hum Haeen Palang Tod	"Panditji Batai Na Biyaah Kab Hoi"	Rajesh Gupta	Vinay Bihari	Poornima, Anand Mohan

== See also ==
- List of songs recorded by Shreya Ghoshal
