= Deepfake =

Realistic artificially generated media

A video deepfake of Kim Jong Un created in 2020 by a nonpartisan advocacy group RepresentUs

Deepfakes (a portmanteau of 'deep learning' and 'fake') are images, videos, or audio that have been edited or generated using artificial intelligence, AI-based tools or audio-video editing software. They may depict real or fictional people and are considered a form of synthetic media, that is media that is usually created by artificial intelligence systems by combining various media elements into a new media artifact.

While the act of creating fake content is not new, deepfakes uniquely leverage machine learning and artificial intelligence techniques, including facial recognition algorithms and artificial neural networks such as variational autoencoders and generative adversarial networks (GANs). In turn, the field of image forensics has worked to develop techniques to detect manipulated images. Deepfakes have garnered widespread attention for their potential use in creating child sexual abuse material, celebrity pornographic videos, revenge porn, fake news, hoaxes, bullying, and financial fraud.

Academics have raised concerns about the potential for deepfakes to promote disinformation and hate speech, as well as interfere with elections. In response, the information technology industry and governments have proposed recommendations and methods to detect and mitigate their use. Academic research has also delved deeper into the factors driving deepfake engagement online as well as potential countermeasures to malicious application of deepfakes.

From traditional entertainment to gaming, deepfake technology has evolved to be increasingly convincing and available to the public, allowing for the disruption of the entertainment and media industries.

== History ==
Photo manipulation was developed in the 19th century and soon applied to motion pictures. Technology steadily improved during the 20th century, and more quickly with the advent of digital video.

Deepfake technology has been developed by researchers at academic institutions beginning in the 1990s, and later by amateurs in online communities. More recently, the methods have been adopted by industry.

The development of generative adversarial networks (GANs) in the mid-2010s represented a key technical turning point in the evolution of deepfakes. GANs allowed for the creation of highly realistic fake images and videos by training competing neural networks, achieving a much improved visual fidelity over previous methods of creating the content using rules or by using autoencoders, and formed the basis for modern deepfake methods.

=== Academic research ===
Academic research related to deepfakes is split between the field of computer vision, a sub-field of computer science, which develops techniques for creating and identifying deepfakes, and humanities and social science approaches that study the social, ethical, aesthetic implications as well as journalistic and informational implications of deepfakes. As deepfakes have become more sophisticated and more common, with innovations provided by AI tools, significant research has gone into developing detection methods and defining the factors driving engagement with deepfakes on the internet. Deepfakes have been shown to appear on social media platforms and other parts of the internet for purposes including entertainment, education related to deepfakes, and misinformation intended to elicit strong reactions. There are gaps in research related to the propagation of deepfakes on social media. Negativity and emotional response are the primary driving factors for users sharing deepfakes.

=== Social science and humanities approaches to deepfakes ===
In cinema studies, deepfakes illustrate how "the human face is emerging as a central object of ambivalence in the digital age". Video artists have used deepfakes to "playfully rewrite film history by retrofitting canonical cinema with new star performers". Film scholar Christopher Holliday analyses how altering the gender and race of performers in familiar movie scenes destabilizes gender classifications and categories. The concept of "queering" deepfakes is also discussed in Oliver M. Gingrich's discussion of media artworks that use deepfakes to reframe gender, including British artist Jake Elwes' Zizi: Queering the Dataset, an artwork that uses deepfakes of drag queens to intentionally play with gender. The aesthetic potentials of deepfakes are also beginning to be explored. Theatre historian John Fletcher notes that early demonstrations of deepfakes are presented as performances, and situates these in the context of theatre, discussing "some of the more troubling paradigm shifts" that deepfakes represent as a performance genre.

While most English-language academic studies of deepfakes focus on the Western anxieties about disinformation and pornography, digital anthropologist Gabriele de Seta has analysed the Chinese reception of deepfakes, which are known as huanlian, meaning "changing faces". The Chinese term does not contain the "fake" of the English deepfake, and de Seta argues that this cultural context may explain why the Chinese response has centered on practical regulatory measures to "fraud risks, image rights, economic profit, and ethical imbalances".

=== Computer science research on deepfakes ===
A landmark early project was the "Video Rewrite" system by principal architect Christoph Bregler, published in 1997. The system modified existing video footage of a person speaking to depict that person mouthing the words from a different audio track. It was the first system to fully automate this kind of facial reanimation, and it did so using machine learning techniques to make connections between the sounds produced by a video's subject and the shape of the subject's face.

Contemporary academic projects have focused on creating more realistic videos and improving deepfake techniques. The "Synthesizing Obama" program, published in 2017, modifies video footage of former president Barack Obama to depict him mouthing the words contained in a separate audio track. The project lists as a main research contribution to its photorealistic technique for synthesizing mouth shapes from audio. The "Face2Face" program, published in 2016, modifies video footage of a person's face to depict them mimicking another person's facial expressions. The project highlights its primary research contribution as the development of the first method for re-enacting facial expressions in real time using a camera that does not capture depth, enabling the technique to work with common consumer cameras.

Researchers have shown that deepfakes are expanding into other domains such as medical imagery. In this work, it was shown how an attacker can automatically inject or remove lung cancer in a patient's 3D CT scan. The result was so convincing that it fooled three radiologists and a state-of-the-art lung cancer detection AI. To demonstrate the threat, the authors successfully performed the attack on a hospital in a White hat penetration test.

A survey of deepfakes, published in May 2020, provides a timeline of how the creation and detection of deepfakes have advanced over the last few years. The survey identifies that researchers have been focusing on resolving the following challenges of deepfake creation:

- Generalization. High-quality deepfakes are often achieved by training on hours of footage of the target. This challenge is to minimize the amount of training data and the time to train the model required to produce quality images and to enable the execution of trained models on new identities (unseen during training).
- Paired Training. Training a supervised model can produce high-quality results, but requires data pairing. This is the process of finding examples of inputs and their desired outputs for the model to learn from. Data pairing is laborious and impractical when training on multiple identities and facial behaviors. Some solutions include self-supervised training (using frames from the same video), the use of unpaired networks such as Cycle-GAN, or the manipulation of network embeddings.
- Identity leakage. This is where the identity of the driver (i.e., the actor controlling the face in a reenactment) is partially transferred to the generated face. Some solutions proposed include attention mechanisms, few-shot learning, disentanglement, boundary conversions, and skip connections.
- Occlusions. When part of the face is obstructed with a hand, hair, glasses, or any other item then artifacts can occur. A common occlusion is a closed mouth which hides the inside of the mouth and the teeth. Some solutions include image segmentation during training and in-painting.
- Temporal coherence. In videos containing deepfakes, artifacts such as flickering and jitter can occur because the network has no context of the preceding frames. Some researchers provide this context or use novel temporal coherence losses to help improve realism. As the technology improves, the interference is diminishing.

Overall, deepfakes are expected to have several implications in media and society, media production, media representations, media audiences, gender, law, and regulation, and politics.

=== Amateur development ===
The term deepfake originated in late 2017 from a Reddit user named "deepfakes". He, along with other members of Reddit's "r/deepfakes", shared deepfakes they created; many videos involved celebrities' faces swapped onto the bodies of actors in pornographic videos, while non-pornographic content included many videos with actor Nicolas Cage's face swapped into various movies.

After this first introduction, amateur development grew at a quick rate because of the presence of open-source software and tutorials on the Internet. The freely available tools like FakeApp, FaceSwap, and DeepFaceLab allowed users who did not have any formal education in computer science to assemble deepfake videos with consumer hardware. Online forums such as Reddit, GitHub and YouTube were important to the distribution of software, instructions, and sample content, and helped to spread and perfect amateur creation of deepfakes quicker.

Other online communities continue to share pornography on platforms that have not banned deepfake pornography.

=== Commercial development ===
In January 2018, a proprietary desktop application called "FakeApp" was launched. This app allows users to easily create and share videos with their faces swapped with each other. As of 2019, "FakeApp" had been largely replaced by open-source alternatives such as "Faceswap", command line-based "DeepFaceLab", and web-based apps such as DeepfakesWeb.

Larger companies started to use deepfakes. Corporate training videos can be created using deepfaked avatars and their voices, for example Synthesia, which uses deepfake technology with avatars to create personalized videos. The mobile app Momo created the application Zao which allows users to superimpose their face on television and movie clips with a single picture. As of 2019 the Japanese AI company DataGrid made a full body deepfake that could create a person from scratch.

By 2020, audio deepfakes and AI software capable of cloning human voices based on a few seconds of speech exist. Tools for deepfake detection also emerge. A mobile deepfake app, Impressions, was launched in March 2020. It was the first app for the creation of celebrity deepfake videos from mobile phones.

=== Resurrection ===
Deepfake technology's ability to fabricate messages and actions of others can extend to the deceased, such as in grief therapy that allows seeming communication with a deceased loved one. In October 2020, Kim Kardashian posted a video featuring a hologram of her late father, Robert Kardashian, created by the company Kaleida, which used a combination of performance, motion tracking, SFX, VFX and DeepFake technologies to create the illusion.

In 2020, a deepfake video of Joaquin Oliver, a victim of the Parkland shooting, was created as part of a gun safety campaign. Oliver's parents partnered with nonprofit Change the Ref and McCann Health to produce a video in which Oliver to encourage people to support gun safety legislation and politicians who back do so as well.

In 2022, a deepfake video of Elvis Presley was used on the program America's Got Talent 17.

== Techniques ==
Deepfakes rely on a type of neural network called an autoencoder. These consist of an encoder, which reduces an image to a lower dimensional latent space, and a decoder, which reconstructs the image from the latent representation. Deepfakes utilize this architecture by having a universal encoder which encodes a person in to the latent space. The latent representation contains key features about their facial features and body posture. This can then be decoded with a model trained specifically for the target. This means the target's detailed information will be superimposed on the underlying facial and body features of the original video, represented in the latent space.

A popular upgrade to this architecture attaches a generative adversarial network to the decoder. A GAN trains a generator, in this case the decoder, and a discriminator in an adversarial relationship. The first network, known as the generator, attempts to craft fabricated images, while the second network, the discriminator, distinguishes between real and fake images using a legitimate data set to guide its judgment. This causes the generator to create images that mimic reality extremely well as any defects would be caught by the discriminator. Both algorithms improve constantly in a zero sum game. This makes deepfakes difficult to combat as they are constantly evolving; any time a defect is determined, it can be corrected.

== Applications ==
=== Acting ===
Digital clones of professional actors have appeared in films before, and progress in deepfake technology is expected to further the accessibility and effectiveness of such clones. The use of AI technology was a major issue in the 2023 SAG-AFTRA strike, as new techniques enabled the capability of generating and storing a digital likeness to use in place of actors.

Disney has improved their visual effects using high-resolution deepfake face swapping technology. Disney improved their technology through progressive training programmed to identify facial expressions, implementing a face-swapping feature, and iterating in order to stabilize and refine the output. This high-resolution deepfake technology saves significant operational and production costs. Disney's deepfake generation model can produce AI-generated media at a 1024 x 1024 resolution, as opposed to common models that produce media at a 256 x 256 resolution. The technology allows Disney to de-age characters or revive deceased actors. Similar technology was initially used by fans to unofficially insert faces into existing media, such as overlaying Harrison Ford's young face onto Han Solo's face in Solo: A Star Wars Story. Disney used deepfakes for the characters of Princess Leia in Rogue One and Luke Skywalker in both The Mandalorian and The Book of Boba Fett.

In the 2024 Indian Tamil science fiction action thriller The Greatest of All Time, the teenage version of Vijay's character Jeevan is portrayed by Ayaz Khan. Vijay's teenage face was then attained by AI deepfake. In May 2025, an AI-generated actress called Tilly Norwood was developed by the Dutch company Xicoia, a division of the existing production company Particle6 that was founded by actor and comedian Eline Van der Velden.

=== Art ===
Deepfakes are also being used in education and media to create realistic videos and interactive content, which offer new ways to engage audiences.

In March 2018 the multidisciplinary artist Joseph Ayerle published the video artwork Un'emozione per sempre 2.0 (English title: The Italian Game). The artist worked with Deepfake technology to create an AI actor, a synthetic version of 80s movie star Ornella Muti, travelling in time from 1978 to 2018. The Massachusetts Institute of Technology referred this artwork in the study "Collective Wisdom". The artist used Ornella Muti's time travel to explore generational reflections, while also investigating questions about the role of provocation in the world of art. For the technical realization Ayerle used scenes of photo model Kendall Jenner. The program replaced Jenner's face by an AI calculated face of Ornella Muti. As a result, the AI actor has the face of the Italian actor Ornella Muti and the body of Kendall Jenner.

Deepfakes have been widely used in satire or to parody celebrities and politicians. The 2020 webseries Sassy Justice, created by Trey Parker and Matt Stone, heavily features the use of deepfaked public figures to satirize current events and raise awareness of deepfake technology.

=== Blackmail ===
Deepfakes can be used to generate blackmail materials that falsely incriminate a victim. A report by the American Congressional Research Service warned that deepfakes could be used to blackmail elected officials or those with access to classified information for espionage or influence purposes.

When or if fakes cannot reliably be distinguished from genuine evidence, victims who are blackmailed over digital evidence might claim that true artifacts are fakes, thereby seeking plausible deniability by relying on an argument of indistinguishability between fake and genuine evidence. The hoped-for effect is to void credibility of certain existing blackmail materials, which, if they were the sole evidence retained by a blackmailer and could not be distinguished by a jury from fake evidence under this argument, could in theory erode loyalty to blackmailers and limit their control over the blackmailed. This phenomenon has been termed "blackmail inflation", since in theory it "devalues" authentic blackmail material. It is possible to utilize commodity GPU hardware with a small software program to generate fake content intended to blackmail anyone for whom an adversary has ample training data. However, even carefully manipulated fakes may still be detected.

The existence of efficient techniques for fabricating false evidence certainly suggests that any combination of video, audio, photographic or other generable evidence alone as the basis for conviction of a crime is by now a perilous and tenuous standard owing to the possibility of maliciously fabricated evidence, raising the importance of multiple firsthand witnesses to a crime, especially for more serious allegations.

=== Entertainment ===
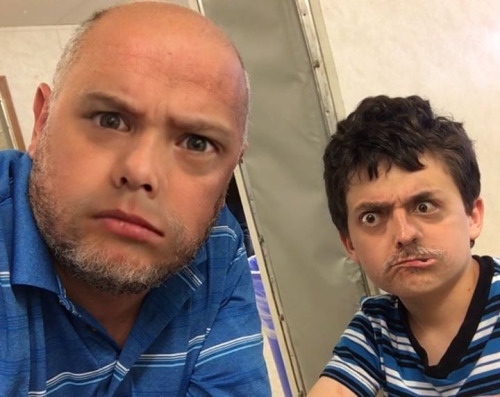
A man and a child using a face swapping app in 2016, to switch their faces

On 8 June 2022, Daniel Emmet, a former AGT contestant, teamed up with the AI startup Metaphysic AI, to create a hyperrealistic deepfake to make it appear as Simon Cowell. Cowell, notoriously known for severely critiquing contestants, was on stage interpreting "You're The Inspiration" by Chicago. Emmet sang on stage as an image of Simon Cowell emerged on the screen behind him in flawless synchronicity.

On 30 August 2022, Metaphysic AI had 'deep-fake' Simon Cowell, Howie Mandel and Terry Crews singing opera on stage.

On 13 September 2022, Metaphysic AI performed with a synthetic version of Elvis Presley for the finals of America's Got Talent.

The MIT artificial intelligence project 15.ai has been used for content creation for multiple Internet fandoms, particularly on social media.

In 2023 the bands ABBA and Kiss partnered with Industrial Light & Magic and Pophouse Entertainment to develop deepfake avatars capable of performing virtual concerts.

=== Fraud and scams ===
Fraudsters and scammers make use of deepfakes to trick people into fake investment schemes, financial fraud, cryptocurrencies, sending money, and following endorsements. The likenesses of celebrities and politicians have been used for large-scale scams, as well as those of private individuals, which are used in spearphishing attacks. According to the Better Business Bureau, deepfake scams are becoming more prevalent. These scams are responsible for an estimated $12 billion in fraud losses globally. According to a recent report these numbers are expected to reach $40 Billion over the next three years. By 2030, the global financial impact of deepfake fraud is projected to reach $58.3 billion, driven by the emergence of "Fraud-as-a-Service". The average loss per criminal deepfake incident now exceeds $500,000, and composite "Frankenstein" synthetic identities are expected to cost the UK economy £4.2 billion by 2027.

Fake endorsements have misused the identities of celebrities like Taylor Swift, Tom Hanks, Oprah Winfrey, and Elon Musk; news anchors like Gayle King and Sally Bundock; and politicians like Lee Hsien Loong and Jim Chalmers. Videos of them have appeared in online advertisements on YouTube, Facebook, and TikTok, who have policies against synthetic and manipulated media. Ads running these videos are seen by millions of people. A single Medicare fraud campaign had been viewed more than 195 million times across thousands of videos. Deepfakes have been used for: a fake giveaway of Le Creuset cookware for a "shipping fee" without receiving the products, except for hidden monthly charges; weight-loss gummies that charge significantly more than what was said; a fake iPhone giveaway; and fraudulent get-rich-quick, investment, and cryptocurrency schemes. Beyond consumer scams, industrialized deepfake operations increasingly target corporate infrastructure, bypassing virtual camera and liveness checks to execute high-profile institutional heists that result in single-event losses of up to $50 million. On 13 November 2024 the Financial Crimes Enforcement Network (FinCEN), part of the U.S. Department of the Treasury, issued an alert (FIN-2024-Alert004) noting that financial institutions were filing more suspicious activity reports that described suspected deepfake media. These often involved fraudulent identity documents used to get past identity verification checks.

Audio deepfakes have been used as part of social engineering scams, fooling people into thinking they are receiving instructions from a trusted individual. In 2019, a U.K.-based energy firm's CEO was scammed over the phone when he was ordered to transfer €220,000 into a Hungarian bank account by an individual who reportedly used audio deepfake technology to impersonate the voice of the firm's parent company's chief executive. As of 2023, the combination advances in deepfake technology, which could clone an individual's voice from a recording of a few seconds to a minute, and new text generation tools, enabled automated impersonation scams, targeting victims using a convincing digital clone of a friend or relative. These sophisticated "vishing" (voice phishing) attacks can accurately clone a target's voice from as little as three seconds of audio, resulting in financial losses for 77% of targeted victims. Furthermore, threat actors are increasingly deploying autonomous "agentic AI" that can reason and adapt in real-time during live social engineering scenarios. The FBI has warned that since April 2025 malicious actors have been impersonating senior US officials through text messages and AI-generated voice messages. Their aim was to gain access to the personal accounts of targets, many of whom were current or former government officials.

=== Politics ===
Deepfakes have been used to misrepresent well-known politicians in videos.

- In February 2018, in separate videos, the face of the Argentine President Mauricio Macri had been replaced by the face of Adolf Hitler, and Angela Merkel's face has been replaced with Donald Trump's.
- In April 2018, Jordan Peele collaborated with BuzzFeed to create a deepfake of Barack Obama with Peele's voice; it served as a public service announcement to increase awareness of deepfakes.
- In January 2019, Fox affiliate KCPQ aired a deepfake of Trump during his Oval Office address, mocking his appearance and skin colour. The employee found responsible for the video was subsequently fired.
- In June 2019, the United States House Intelligence Committee held hearings on the potential malicious use of deepfakes to sway elections.
- In April 2020, the Belgian branch of Extinction Rebellion published a deepfake video of Belgian Prime Minister Sophie Wilmès on Facebook. The video promoted a possible link between deforestation and COVID-19. It had more than 100,000 views within 24 hours and received many comments. On the Facebook page where the video appeared, many users interpreted the deepfake video as genuine.
- During the 2020 US presidential campaign, many deepfakes surfaced purporting Joe Biden in cognitive decline—falling asleep during an interview, getting lost, and misspeaking—all bolstering rumours of his decline.
- During the 2020 Delhi Legislative Assembly election campaign, the Delhi Bharatiya Janata Party used similar technology to distribute a version of an English-language campaign advertisement by its leader, Manoj Tiwari, translated into Haryanvi to target Haryana voters. A voiceover was provided by an actor, and AI trained using video of Tiwari speeches was used to lip-sync the video to the new voiceover. A party staff member described it as a "positive" use of deepfake technology, which allowed them to "convincingly approach the target audience even if the candidate didn't speak the language of the voter."
- In 2020, Bruno Sartori produced deepfakes parodying politicians like Jair Bolsonaro and Donald Trump.
- In April 2021, politicians in a number of European countries were approached by pranksters Vovan and Lexus, who are accused by critics of working for the Russian state. They impersonated Leonid Volkov, a Russian opposition politician and chief of staff of the Russian opposition leader Alexei Navalny's campaign, allegedly through deepfake technology. However, the pair told The Verge that they did not use deepfakes, and just used a look-alike.
- In May 2023, a deepfake video of Vice President Kamala Harris supposedly slurring her words and speaking nonsensically about today, tomorrow and yesterday went viral on social media.
- In June 2023, in the United States, Ron DeSantis's presidential campaign used a deepfake to misrepresent Donald Trump.
- In November 2023, a deepfake video of the German Chancellor Olaf Scholz announcing a plan to ban the political activities of the AfD was uploaded to YouTube by the Zentrum für Politische Schönheit (Center of Political Beauty).
- In March 2024, during India's state assembly elections, deepfake technology was widely employed by political candidates to reach out to voters. Many politicians used AI-generated deepfakes created by startup The Indian Deepfaker, founded by Divyendra Singh Jadoun, to translate their speeches into multiple regional languages, allowing them to engage with diverse linguistic communities across the country. This surge in the use of deepfakes for political campaigns marked a significant shift in electioneering tactics in India.
- In June 2025, Javier Milei's government backed a smear campaign against journalist Mengolini, which was partly based on explicit deepfakes.
- In July 2025, Donald Trump posted a deepfake on his Truth Social account, depicting former president Barack Obama getting arrested at the White House and put in prison.

=== Pornography ===
In 2017, Deepfake pornography prominently surfaced on the Internet, particularly on Reddit. As of 2019, many deepfakes on the internet feature pornography of female celebrities whose likeness is typically used without their consent. A report published in October 2019 by Dutch cybersecurity startup Deeptrace estimated that 96% of all deepfakes online were pornographic. As of 2018, a Daisy Ridley deepfake first captured attention, among others. As of October 2019, most of the deepfake subjects on the internet were British and American actors. However, around a quarter of the subjects are South Korean, the majority of which are K-pop stars.

In June 2019, a downloadable Windows and Linux application called DeepNude was released that used neural networks, specifically generative adversarial networks, to remove clothing from images of women. The app had both a paid and unpaid version, the paid version costing $50. On 27 June the creators removed the application and refunded consumers.

Female celebrities are often a main target when it comes to deepfake pornography. In 2023, deepfake porn videos appeared online of Emma Watson and Scarlett Johansson in a face swapping app. In 2024, deepfake porn images circulated online of Taylor Swift.

Academic studies have reported that women, LGBT people and people of colour (particularly activists, politicians and those questioning power) are at higher risk of being targets of promulgation of deepfake pornography. Deepfake technology has become a tool for gender-based harassment and violence, proportionally targeting women and marginalized groups. There is an increasing ethical and equity concerns of intimidation and reputational harm intentions behind this specific media.

=== Social media ===
Deepfakes have begun to see use in popular social media platforms, notably through Zao, a Chinese deepfake app that allows users to substitute their own faces onto those of characters in scenes from films and television shows such as Romeo + Juliet and Game of Thrones. The app originally faced scrutiny over its invasive user data and privacy policy, after which the company put out a statement claiming it would revise the policy. In January 2020 Facebook announced that it was introducing new measures to counter this on its platforms.

The Congressional Research Service cited unspecified evidence as showing that foreign intelligence operatives used deepfakes to create social media accounts with the purposes of recruiting individuals with access to classified information.

In 2021, realistic deepfake videos of actor Tom Cruise were released on TikTok, which went viral and garnered more than tens of millions of views. The deepfake videos featured an "artificial intelligence-generated doppelganger" of Cruise doing various activities such as teeing off at the golf course, showing off a coin trick, and biting into a lollipop. The creator of the clips, Belgian VFX Artist Chris Umé, said he first got interested in deepfakes in 2018 and saw the "creative potential" of them.

=== Sockpuppets ===
Deepfake photographs can be used to create sockpuppets, non-existent people, who are active both online and in traditional media. A deepfake photograph appears to have been generated together with a legend for an apparently non-existent person named Oliver Taylor, whose identity was described as a university student in the United Kingdom. The Oliver Taylor persona submitted opinion pieces in several newspapers and was active in online media attacking a British legal academic and his wife, as "terrorist sympathizers". The academic had drawn international attention in 2018 when he commenced a lawsuit in Israel against NSO, a surveillance company, on behalf of people in Mexico who alleged they were victims of NSO's phone hacking technology. Reuters could find only scant records for Oliver Taylor and "his" university had no records for him. Many experts agreed that the profile photo is a deepfake. Several newspapers have not retracted articles attributed to him or removed them from their websites. It is feared that such techniques are a new battleground in disinformation.

== Concerns and countermeasures ==
Though fake photos have long been plentiful, faking motion pictures has been more difficult, and the presence of deepfakes increases the difficulty of classifying videos as genuine or not. AI researcher Alex Champandard has said people should know how fast things can be corrupted with deepfake technology, and that the problem is not a technical one, but rather one to be solved by trust in information and journalism. Computer science associate professor Hao Li of the University of Southern California states that deepfakes created for malicious use, such as fake news, will be even more harmful if nothing is done to spread awareness of deepfake technology. Li predicted that genuine videos and deepfakes would become indistinguishable in as soon as six months, as of October 2019, due to rapid advancement in artificial intelligence and computer graphics. Former Google fraud czar Shuman Ghosemajumder has called deepfakes an area of "societal concern" and said that they will inevitably evolve to a point at which they can be generated automatically, and an individual could use that technology to produce millions of deepfake videos.

=== Credibility of information ===
A primary pitfall is that humanity could fall into an age in which it can no longer be determined whether a medium's content corresponds to the truth. Deepfakes are one of a number of tools for disinformation attack, creating doubt, and undermining trust. They have a potential to interfere with democratic functions in societies, such as identifying collective agendas, debating issues, informing decisions, and solving problems through the exercise of political will. People may also start to dismiss real events as fake.

=== Defamation ===
Deepfakes possess the ability to damage individual entities tremendously. This is because deepfakes are often targeted at one individual, and/or their relations to others in hopes to create a narrative powerful enough to influence public opinion or beliefs. This can be done through deepfake voice phishing, which manipulates audio to create fake phone calls or conversations. Another method of deepfake use is fabricated private remarks, which manipulate media to convey individuals voicing damaging comments. The quality of a negative video or audio does not need to be that high. As long as someone's likeness and actions are recognizable, a deepfake can hurt their reputation.

In September 2020, Microsoft made public that they were developing a Deepfake detection software tool.

=== Detection ===
==== Audio ====
Detecting fake audio is a highly complex task that requires careful attention to the audio signal in order to achieve good performance. Using deep learning, preprocessing of feature design and masking augmentation have been proven effective in improving performance.

==== Video ====
Most of the academic research surrounding deepfakes focuses on the detection of deepfake videos. One approach to deepfake detection is to use algorithms to recognize patterns and pick up subtle inconsistencies that arise in deepfake videos. For example, researchers have developed automatic systems that examine videos for errors such as irregular blinking patterns of lighting. This approach has been criticized because deepfake detection is characterized by a "moving goal post" where the production of deepfakes continues to change and improve as algorithms to detect deepfakes improve. In order to assess the most effective algorithms for detecting deepfakes, a coalition of leading technology companies hosted the Deepfake Detection Challenge to accelerate the technology for identifying manipulated content. The winning model of the Deepfake Detection Challenge was 65% accurate on the holdout set of 4,000 videos. A team at Massachusetts Institute of Technology published a paper in December 2021 demonstrating that ordinary humans are 69–72% accurate at identifying a random sample of 50 of these videos.

Beyond automated detection, viewers can rely on context and perceptual cues to identify deep fake content. Studies have found that viewers can note inconsistencies with body language, facial features, lighting and audio to mouth movement. These are some ways to identify inauthentic content, but these are not always the most reliable ways to determine whether or not the content is real. Evidence suggests that in natural viewing conditions, viewers are not more likely to recognize deep fake videos over authentic videos. Using content warnings has shown mixed results, where the warnings did not improve the accuracy of detection and also resulted in some individuals incorrectly judging videos as deep fake.

Another team led by Wael AbdAlmageed with Visual Intelligence and Multimedia Analytics Laboratory (VIMAL) of the Information Sciences Institute at the University Of Southern California developed two generations of deepfake detectors based on convolutional neural networks. The first generation used recurrent neural networks to spot spatio-temporal inconsistencies to identify visual artifacts left by the deepfake generation process. The algorithm achieved 96% accuracy on FaceForensics++, the only large-scale deepfake benchmark available at that time. The second generation used end-to-end deep networks to differentiate between artifacts and high-level semantic facial information using two-branch networks. The first branch propagates colour information while the other branch suppresses facial content and amplifies low-level frequencies using Laplacian of Gaussian (LoG).

Other techniques suggest that blockchain could be used to verify the source of the media. For instance, a video might have to be verified through the ledger before it is shown on social media platforms. With this technology, only videos from trusted sources would be approved, decreasing the spread of possibly harmful deepfake media.

Digitally signing of all video and imagery by cameras and video cameras, including smartphone cameras, was suggested to fight deepfakes. That allows tracing every photograph or video back to its original owner that can be used to pursue dissidents.

One easy way to uncover deepfake video calls consists in asking the caller to turn sideways.

In April 2026, Zoom partnered with Tools for Humanity to introduce "World ID Deep Face," a real-time verification feature that confirms whether a video call participant is human by cross-referencing an Orb-captured biometric signature, an on-device Face Auth selfie, and live video frames. Verified participants display a "Verified Human" badge during the call. The feature was aimed at regulated industries such as finance and healthcare, where confirming a caller's identity in real time helps guard against deepfake-based impersonation.

=== Deepfake detection and regulation ===
Legal experts are actively questioning whether current and emerging regulatory frameworks adequately balance the advancements in deepfake detection with the protection of individual rights. Relevant legislation being scrutinized includes the EU AI Act, the General Data Protection Regulation (GDPR), the Digital Services Act in the European Union, as well as the fragmented state and federal laws in the United States, the Online Safety Act 2023 in the United Kingdom, and China's Administrative Provisions on Deep Synthesis in Internet-Based Information Services (commonly known as the Deep Synthesis Provisions). Scholars are evaluating if these frameworks effectively address the complex interplay between technology, rights, and responsibilities in the context of deepfakes.

In 2024, researchers led by computer scientist V. S. Subrahmanian at Northwestern University published the Global Online Deepfake Detection System, which is designed to help verified journalists determine whether certain audio, images, and videos artifacts are authentic or manipulated by AI. The platform combines automated deepfake-detection models with human analysis and contextual information about the subject and circumstances depicted in the media.

=== Prevention ===
Henry Ajder who works for Deeptrace, a company that detects deepfakes, says there are several ways to protect against deepfakes in the workplace. Semantic passwords or secret questions can be used when holding important conversations. Voice authentication and other biometric security features should be up to date. Educate employees about deepfakes.

=== Media literacy and deepfakes ===
Due to the capability of deepfakes to fool viewers and believably mimic a person, research has indicated that the concept of truth through observation cannot be fully relied on. Additionally, literacy of the technology among populations could be called into question due to the relatively new success of convincing deepfakes. When combined with increasing ease of access to the technology, this has led to the concern among some experts that some societies are not prepared to interact with deepfakes organically without potential consequences from sharing misinformation and disinformation. Media literacy has been considered as a potential counter to "prime" a viewer to identify a deepfake when they encounter one organically by encouraging critical thinking. While media literacy education can have conflicting results in the overall success in detecting deepfakes, research has indicated that critical thinking and a sceptical outlook toward a presented piece of media are effective at assisting an individual in determining a deepfake. Media literacy frameworks promote critical analysis of media and the motivations behind the presentation of the associated content and can reduce vulnerability of disinformation. Media literacy shows promise as a potential cognitive countermeasure when interacting with malicious deepfakes.

=== Controversies ===
In March 2024, a video clip was released by Buckingham Palace announcing that Kate Middleton had cancer and was undergoing chemotherapy. The appearance of a ring worn by Middleton in the clip fuelled rumours that the clip was a deepfake. Johnathan Perkins, UCLA's Director of Race and Equity, doubted Middleton had cancer, and further speculated that she could be in critical condition or dead.

=== Politics ===
Researchers have studied the capabilities and effects of deepfakes when used in disinformation campaigns, including the potential for deepfakes to circumvent a person's scepticism and influence their views on an issue. Unlike crude misinformation, political propaganda via generative AI often co-opts cultural tropes, visual media, and satire to craft emotionally resonant messages that are difficult to fact-check without losing nuance. Due to the continued advancement in technology that improves deceptive capabilities of deepfakes, some scholars believe that deepfakes could pose a significant threat to democratic societies. Studies have investigated the effects of political deepfakes. In two separate studies focusing on Dutch participants, it was found that deepfakes have varying effects on an audience. As a tool of disinformation, deepfakes did not necessarily produce stronger reactions or shifts in viewpoints than traditional textual disinformation. However, deepfakes did produce a reassuring effect on individuals who held preconceived notions that aligned with the viewpoint promoted by the deepfake disinformation in the study. Additionally, deepfakes are effective when designed to target a specific demographic segment related to a particular issue. "Microtargeting" involves understanding nuanced political issues of a specific demographic to create a targeted deepfake. The targeted deepfake is then used to connect with and influence the viewpoint of that demographic. Targeted deepfakes were found to be notably effective by some researchers. Other researchers in the United Kingdom found that deepfake political disinformation does not have a guaranteed effect on populations beyond indications that it may sow distrust or uncertainty in a source that provides the deepfake. The implications of distrust in sources led those researchers to conclude that deepfakes may have outsized effect in a "low-trust" information environment where public institutions are not trusted by the public.

Across the world, there are key instances where deepfakes have been used to misrepresent well-known politicians and other public figures.

=== Liar's dividend ===
The liar's dividend is a political and social phenomenon in which, when faced with incriminating or embarrassing authentic video or audio recordings of themselves, individuals will claim that the recordings are AI in order to dismiss the claims and gain sympathy.

== Example events ==
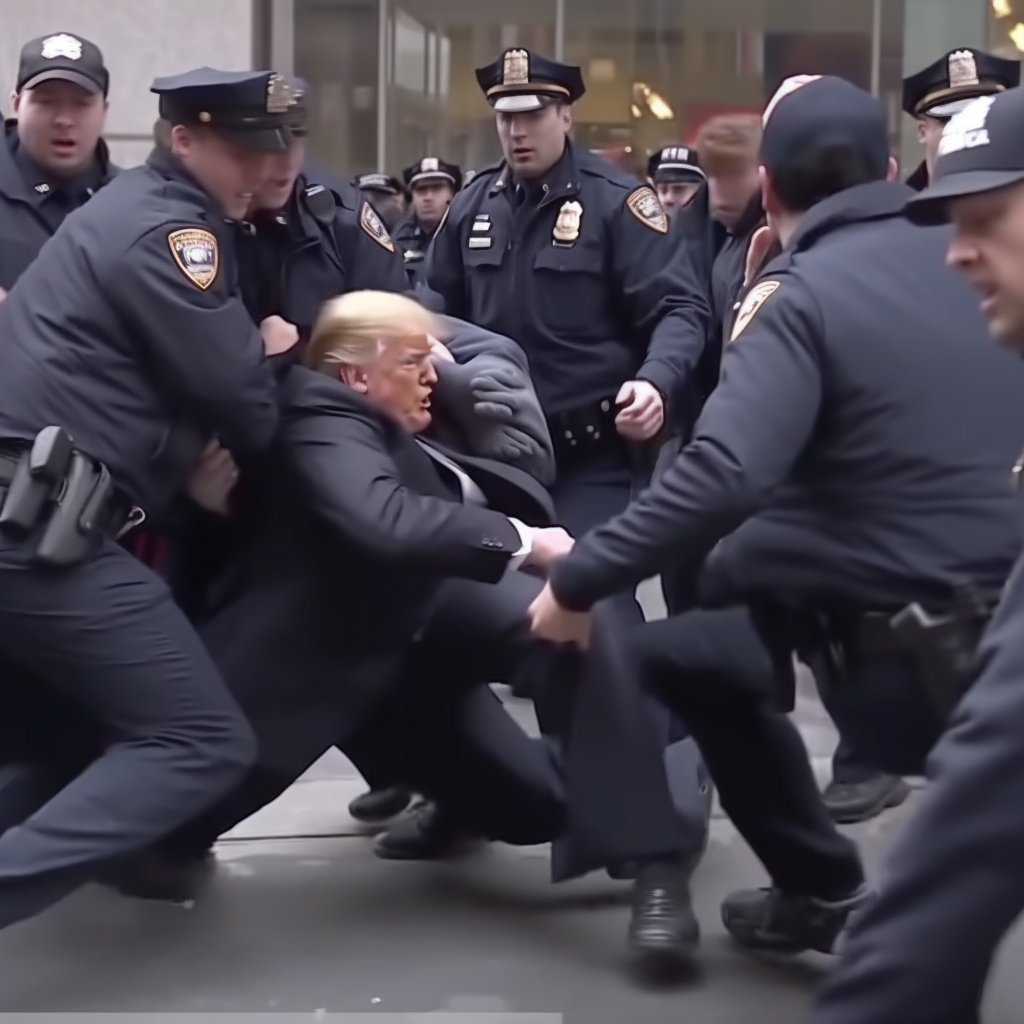
A fake Midjourney-created image of Donald Trump being arrested

Deepfake video: Vladimir Putin warning Americans on election interference and increasing political divide

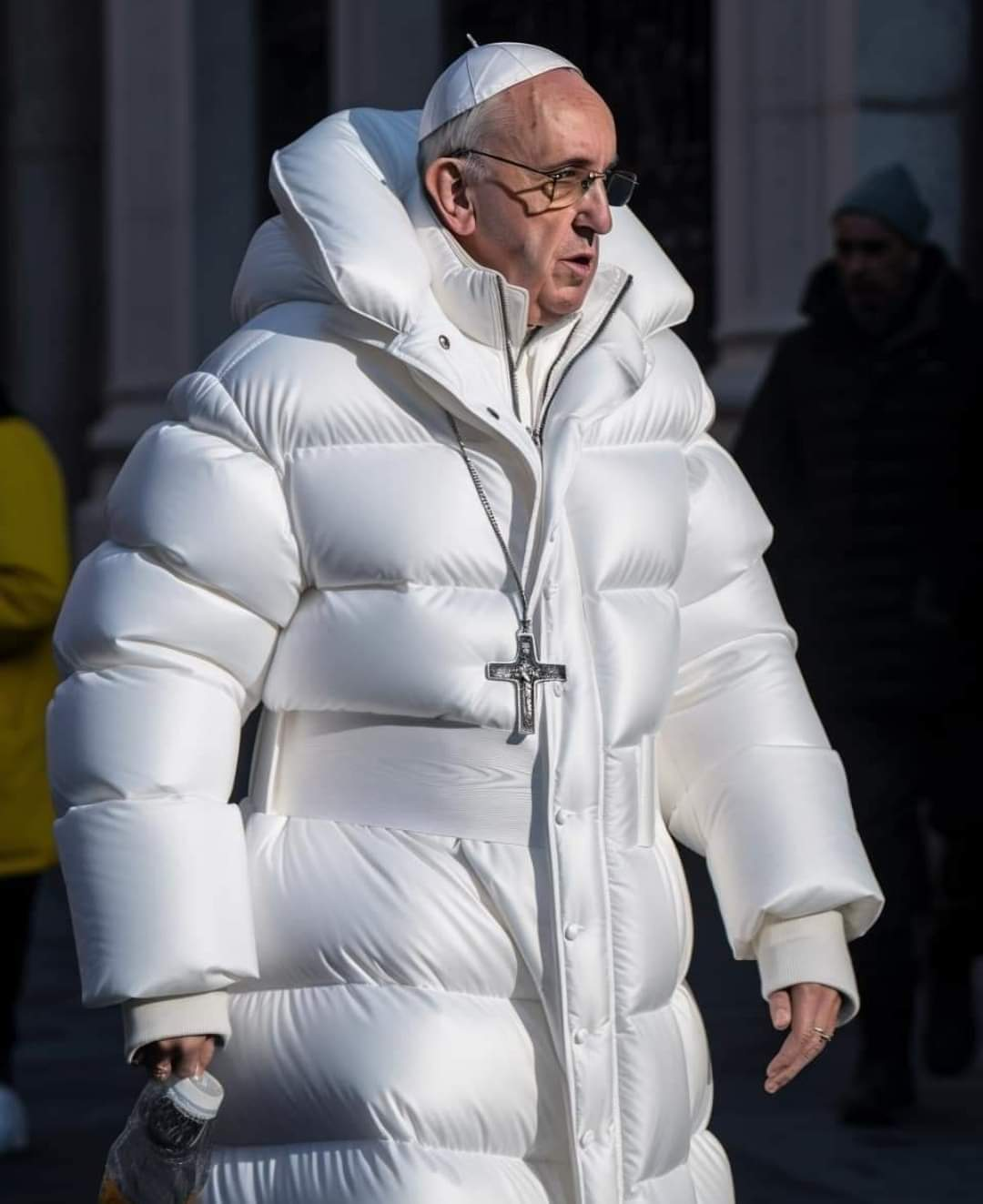
The fake Midjourney-created image of Pope Francis wearing a puffer jacket

Barack Obama
On 17 April 2018, American actor Jordan Peele, BuzzFeed, and Monkeypaw Productions posted a deepfake of Barack Obama to YouTube, which depicted Barack Obama cursing and calling Donald Trump names. In this deepfake, Peele's voice and face were transformed and manipulated into those of Obama. The intent of this video was to portray the dangerous consequences and power of deepfakes, and how deepfakes can make anyone say anything.
Donald Trump
On 5 May 2019, Derpfakes posted a deepfake of Donald Trump to YouTube, based on a skit Jimmy Fallon performed on The Tonight Show. In the original skit (aired 4 May 2016), Jimmy Fallon dressed as Donald Trump and pretended to participate in a phone call with Barack Obama, conversing in a manner that presented him to be bragging about his primary win in Indiana. In the deepfake, Jimmy Fallon's face was transformed into Donald Trump's face, with the audio remaining the same. This deepfake video was produced by Derpfakes with a comedic intent. In March 2023, a series of images appeared to show New York Police Department officers restraining Trump. The images, created using Midjourney, were initially posted on Twitter by Eliot Higgins but were later re-shared without context, leading some viewers to believe they were real photographs.
Nancy Pelosi
In 2019, a clip from Nancy Pelosi's speech at the Center for American Progress (given on 22 May 2019) in which the video was slowed down, in addition to the pitch of the audio being altered, to make it seem as if she were drunk, was widely distributed on social media. Critics argue that this was not a deepfake, but a shallowfake—a less sophisticated form of video manipulation.
Mark Zuckerberg
In May 2019, two artists collaborating with the company CannyAI created a deepfake video of Facebook founder Mark Zuckerberg talking about harvesting and controlling data from billions of people. The video was part of an exhibit to educate the public about the dangers of artificial intelligence.
Kim Jong-un and Vladimir Putin
On 29 September 2020, deepfakes of North Korean leader Kim Jong-un and Russian President Vladimir Putin were uploaded to YouTube, created by a nonpartisan advocacy group RepresentUs. The deepfakes of Kim and Putin were meant to air publicly as commercials to relay the notion that interference by these leaders in US elections would be detrimental to the United States' democracy. The commercials also aimed to shock Americans to realize how fragile democracy is, and how media and news can significantly influence the country's path regardless of credibility. However, while the commercials included an ending comment detailing that the footage was not real, they ultimately did not air due to fears and sensitivity regarding how Americans may react. On 5 June 2023, an unknown source broadcast a reported deepfake of Vladimir Putin on multiple radio and television networks. In the clip, Putin appears to deliver a speech announcing the invasion of Russia and calling for a general mobilization of the army.
Volodymyr Zelenskyy
On 16 March 2022, a one-minute long deepfake video depicting Ukraine's president Volodymyr Zelenskyy seemingly telling his soldiers to lay down their arms and surrender during the 2022 Russian invasion of Ukraine was circulated on social media. Russian social media boosted it, but after it was debunked, Facebook and YouTube removed it. Twitter allowed the video in tweets where it was exposed as a fake, but said it would be taken down if posted to deceive people. Hackers inserted the disinformation into a live scrolling-text news crawl on TV station Ukraine 24, and the video appeared briefly on the station's website in addition to false claims that Zelenskyy had fled his country's capital, Kyiv. It was not immediately clear who created the deepfake, to which Zelenskyy responded with his own video, saying, "We don't plan to lay down any arms. Until our victory."
Wolf News
In late 2022, pro-China propagandists started spreading deepfake videos purporting to be from "Wolf News" that used synthetic actors. The technology was developed by a London company called Synthesia, which markets it as a cheap alternative to live actors for training and HR videos.
Pope Francis
In March 2023, an anonymous construction worker from Chicago used Midjourney to create a fake image of Pope Francis in a white Balenciaga puffer jacket. The image went viral, receiving over twenty million views. Writer Ryan Broderick dubbed it "the first real mass-level AI misinformation case". Experts consulted by Slate characterized the image as unsophisticated: "you could have made it on Photoshop five years ago".
Keir Starmer
In October 2023, a deepfake audio clip of the UK Labour Party leader Keir Starmer abusing staffers was released on the first day of a Labour Party conference. The clip purported to be an audio tape of Starmer abusing his staffers.
Rashmika Mandanna
In early November 2023, a famous South Indian actor, Rashmika Mandanna fell prey to DeepFake when a morphed video of a famous British-Indian influencer, Zara Patel, with Rashmika's face started to float on social media. Zara Patel claims to not be involved in its creation.
Bongbong Marcos
In April 2024, a deepfake video misrepresenting Philippine President Bongbong Marcos was released. It is a slideshow accompanied by a deepfake audio of Marcos purportedly ordering the Armed Forces of the Philippines and special task force to act "however appropriate" should China attack the Philippines. The video was released amidst tensions related to the South China Sea dispute. The Presidential Communications Office has said that there is no such directive from the president and said a foreign actor might be behind the fabricated media. Criminal charges has been filed by the Kapisanan ng mga Brodkaster ng Pilipinas in relation to the deepfake media. On 22 July 2024, a video of Marcos purportedly snorting illegal drugs was released by Claire Contreras, a former supporter of Marcos. Dubbed as the polvoron video, the media noted its consistency with the insinuation of Marcos' predecessor—Rodrigo Duterte—that Marcos is a drug addict; the video was also shown at a Hakbang ng Maisug rally organized by people aligned with Duterte. Two days later, the Philippine National Police and the National Bureau of Investigation, based on their own findings, concluded that the video was created using AI; they further pointed out inconsistencies with the person on the video with Marcos, such as details on the two people's ears.
Joe Biden
Prior to the 2024 United States presidential election, phone calls imitating the voice of the incumbent Joe Biden were made to dissuade people from voting for him. The person responsible for the calls was charged with voter suppression and impersonating a candidate. The FCC proposed to fine him US$6 million and Lingo Telecom, the company that allegedly relayed the calls, $2 million.
Arup Group
The firm Arup Group lost $25 million in 2024 from a deepfake scam.
Sara Duterte
Philippine Senator Ronald dela Rosa on 14 June 2025 shared a 40-second Deepfake video created via Veo where two students on the street testified on why the impeachment proceedings against Vice President Sara Duterte is selective and politically motivated. Dela Rosa lauded the supposed youth for their opinions. When informed it was an AI video, he says that if that was the case the video creator had a point. Duterte herself defended Dela Rosa, insisting that sharing an AI video is not wrong as long as its "not for profit".

Catherine Connolly
In October 2025, Irish presidential candidate Catherine Connolly condemned an AI-generated deepfake video that mimicked an RTÉ News report and falsely claimed she was withdrawing from the presidential election; her campaign reported the video to the social media platforms it appeared on.

== Responses ==
=== Social media platforms ===
Chat site Discord took action against deepfake pornography in 2018, and has taken a general stance against deepfakes. Gfycat began removing all deepfakes from its site on 31 January 2018.

Reddit banned the r/deepfakes subreddit on 7 February 2018, due to the policy violation of "involuntary pornography". Also in February 2018, Pornhub said that it would ban deepfake videos on its website because it is considered "non consensual content" which violates their terms of service. They had also stated previously that they will take down content flagged as deepfakes. Writers from Motherboard reported that searching "deepfakes" on Pornhub still returned multiple recent deepfake videos.

Google added "involuntary synthetic pornographic imagery" to its ban list in September 2018, allowing anyone to request the block of results showing their fake nudes. In May 2022, Google officially changed the terms of service for their Jupyter Notebook colabs, banning the use of their colab service for the purpose of creating deepfakes. This came a few days after the publication of a VICE article in which its author, Emanuel Maiberg, reported "Most deepfakes are non-consensual porn", and that the main use of popular deepfake software DeepFaceLab (DFL), "the most important technology powering the vast majority of this generation of deepfakes", which often was used in combination with Google colabs, was to create non-consensual pornography. Maiberg pointed to the fact that among many other well-known examples of third-party DFL implementations – such as deepfakes commissioned by The Walt Disney Company, official music videos, and web series Sassy Justice by the creators of South Park and DFL's GitHub page – also linked to deepfake porn website MrDeepFakes, on which members of the DFL Discord server also participate.

Facebook has previously stated that they would not remove deepfakes from their platforms. The videos will instead be flagged as fake by third-parties and then have a lessened priority in user's feeds. This response was prompted in June 2019 after a deepfake featuring a 2016 video of Mark Zuckerberg circulated on Facebook and Instagram. Subsequently, Facebook has taken efforts towards encouraging the creation of deepfakes in order to develop state of the art deepfake detection software. Facebook was the prominent partner in hosting the Deepfake Detection Challenge (DFDC), held December 2019, to 2114 participants who generated more than 35,000 models. The top performing models with the highest detection accuracy were analysed for similarities and differences; these findings are areas of interest in further research to improve and refine deepfake detection models. Facebook has also detailed that the platform will be taking down media generated with artificial intelligence used to alter an individual's speech. However, media that has been edited to alter the order or context of words in one's message would remain on the site but be labelled as false, since it was not generated by artificial intelligence.

In February 2018, representatives from Twitter (now X) stated that they would suspend accounts suspected of posting non-consensual deepfake content. In 2019, Twitter announced it was seeking public feedback on a prospective policy for its handling of "synthetic and manipulated media". Under the draft policy, TechCrunch reported that Twitter "would label and warn, but not always remove, manipulated media".

=== Legislation ===
In the United States, there have been some responses to the problems posed by deepfakes. In 2018, the Malicious Deep Fake Prohibition Act was introduced to the US Senate; in 2019, the Deepfakes Accountability Act was introduced in the 116th United States Congress by U.S. representative for New York's 9th congressional district Yvette Clarke.

In 2024, over half of documented identity fraud involved AI-created forgeries, leading several states to introduce legislation regarding deepfakes, including Virginia, Texas, California, and New York; charges as varied as identity theft, cyberstalking, and revenge porn have been pursued, while more comprehensive statutes are urged.

Among U.S. legislative efforts, on 3 October 2019, California governor Gavin Newsom signed into law Assembly Bills No. 602 and No. 730. Assembly Bill No. 602 provides individuals targeted by sexually explicit deepfake content made without their consent with a cause of action against the content's creator. Assembly Bill No. 730 prohibits the distribution of malicious deepfake audio or visual media targeting a candidate running for public office within 60 days of their election. U.S. representative Yvette Clarke introduced H.R. 5586: Deepfakes Accountability Act into the 118th United States Congress on 20 September 2023 in an effort to protect national security from threats posed by deepfake technology. U.S. representative María Salazar introduced H.R. 6943: No AI Fraud Act into the 118th United States Congress on 10 January 2024, to establish specific property rights of individual physicality, including voice.

=== Response from DARPA ===
In 2016, the Defense Advanced Research Projects Agency (DARPA) launched the Media Forensics (MediFor) program which was funded through 2020. MediFor aimed at automatically spotting digital manipulation in images and videos, including Deepfakes. In the summer of 2018, MediFor held an event where individuals competed to create AI-generated videos, audio, and images as well as automated tools to detect these deepfakes. According to the MediFor program, it established a framework of three tiers of information—digital integrity, physical integrity and semantic integrity—to generate one integrity score in an effort to enable accurate detection of manipulated media.

In 2019, DARPA hosted a "proposers day" for the Semantic Forensics (SemaFor) program where researchers were driven to prevent viral spread of AI-manipulated media. DARPA and the Semantic Forensics Program were also working together to detect AI-manipulated media through efforts in training computers to utilize common sense, logical reasoning. Built on the MediFor's technologies, SemaFor's attribution algorithms infer if digital media originates from a particular organization or individual, while characterization algorithms determine whether media was generated or manipulated for malicious purposes. In March 2024, SemaFor published an analytic catalog that offers the public access to open-source resources developed under SemaFor.

=== International Panel on the Information Environment ===
The International Panel on the Information Environment was launched in 2023 as a consortium of over 250 scientists working to develop effective countermeasures to deepfakes and other problems created by perverse incentives in organizations disseminating information via the Internet.

== See also ==
- Artificial intelligence and elections
- Artificial intelligence art
- Celebrity impersonation scams on social media
- Computer facial animation
- Dead Internet theory
- Digital cloning
- Digital face replacement
- Facial motion capture
- Fake nude photography
- Fifth-generation warfare
- Generative AI
- Hyperreality
- Identity replacement technology
- Interactive online characters
- Regulation of artificial intelligence
- StyleGAN
- Synthetic media
- Uncanny valley
- Virtual actor
