= My Country Mobile =

- Company type: Private company
- Industry: Telecommunications service provider
- Founded: 2010; 16 years ago
- Headquarters: Dubai, United Arab Emirates
- Website: mycountrymobile.com

My Country Mobile General Trading is a private Dubai based telecommunications service provider, that offers VoIP-based telecommunication products and services. It has additional offices in Singapore, Hong Kong and United Kingdom.

== History ==
My Country Mobile was established in 2010 with its headquarter in Dubai, UAE. It operates in 6 countries across USA, UK, Singapore, Hong Kong, and UAE. The company has over 500,000 retail outlets around the world. It launched Callmama app, where customers can make voip calls from their mobile phones. Shawar Ali, Bollywood Actor was named as the brand ambassador for Callmama app.

== Products and services ==
It offers wholesale carrier services, intentional Top up, API, DID's, MVNO operations, retail Telecom products, distributors of domestic and international calling cards and other telephony products across the globe. It also offer mobile application, Callmama that allows users to make voip calls from their mobile phones.
