= Rani Chatterjee =

Indian actress (born 1989)

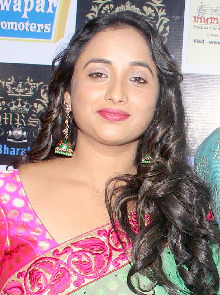
- Chatterjee in 2020
- Born: Sabiha Shaikh; 3 November 1989 (age 37); Bombay, Maharashtra, India
- Occupations: Actress; television presenter; dancer
- Years active: 2003–present

Sabiha Shaikh (born 3 November 1989), known professionally as Rani Chatterjee, is an Indian actress who primarily works in Bhojpuri films. Considered as one of the highest paid Bhojpuri actress, Chatterjee made her acting debut with Sasura Bada Paisawala (2004), which is still ranked as the highest-grossing Bhojpuri film. She has won several awards including five Bhojpuri Film Awards and three International Bhojpuri Film Awards.

Chatterjee went onto establish herself as a leading actress with successful films such as Sita (2007), Devra Bada Satawela (2010), Ganga Yamuna Saraswati (2012), Nagin (2013), Rani No. 786 (2013), Dariya Dil (2014), Rani Banal Jwala (2015), Gharwali Baharwali (2016), Real Indian Mother (2016), Rani Weds Raja (2019) and Lady Singham (2022). She made her web debut with Mastram (2020) and television debut with Mast Mauli (2023).

== Early life ==
Chatterjee was born as Sabiha Shaikh in a Muslim family on 3 November 1989. She was born and brought up in Mumbai. Chatterjee did her schooling from Tungareshwar Academy High school, Vasai. Rani, who is originally Sabiha Shaikh on her documents, shares an interesting reason behind it. Talking to a section of media recently Rani said, "In 2004 I was shooting for a Bhojpuri film titled Sasura Bada Paisawala and one day we were shooting a sequence in a temple where I have to bang my head on the floor. And while the shoot was on a few media people had come to interview me also there was a lot of crowd was also watching the shoot. So my director thought revealing my original name might create a scene as I am a Muslim. So when someone people asked my name he said Rani and when they asked about my surname so he couldn't think of anything and said Chatterjee as Rani Mukerji was very famous at that point of time. And she also became famous with this name".

Rani also adds, "My family was definitely angry on me for keeping that name as my identity but she convinced them as she really found that name lucky. Manoj Tiwari was opposite me in the film and it became a huge hit on box office. In fact, made many records. Due to which I was offered a lot of work and I became the highest-paid actress in Bhojpuri cinema".

== Career ==
Chatterjee made her film debut in the 2003 Bhojpuri family drama Sasura Bada Paisawala featuring Manoj Tiwari. The film released in 2004 and was a success and won several awards. She followed it up with major hits like Bandhan Tute Na (2005), Damaad Ji (2006) and Munna Pandey Berozgar (2007). She earned a lot of critical acclaim for her titular role in Munnibai Nautanki Wali (2009). She won her first Best Actress Award for Devra Bada Satawela (2010).

The sixth Bhojpuri Awards in 2013 declared Chatterjee as the Best Actress of the year for her performance in Nagin. Rani has acted in a Punjabi film Aasra. In 2020, Chatterjee acted in MX player web series Mastram. She later acted in Kooku App web series Rani Ka Raja.

== Media image ==
Chatterjee is considered in the media as one of the most popular and highest paid Bhojpuri actress. She is also one of the most followed Bhojpuri actress on Instagram with over 2 million followers.

== Filmography ==
=== Films ===
Key
†	Denotes films that have not yet been released

- Note: The list does not include all the films featuring Rani Chatterjee.

Year	Title	Role	Notes	Ref.
2004	Sasura Bada Paisawala	Rani		
2005	Bandhan Tute Na			
2006	Damaad Ji			
2007	Sita	Sita		
2007	Munna Pandey Berozgaar	Suman		
2007	London Wali Se Neha Lagavli	Preeti		
2009	Tohar Naikhe Kavno Jod Tu Bejod Badu Ho			
2010	Devra Bada Satawela	Rani		
2010	Saat Saheliyan			
2010	Satyamev Jayate			
2011	Diljale			
2011	Chaila Babu			
2011	Phool Banal Angar			
2012	Ganga Yamuna Saraswati			
2012	Dhadkela Tohre Name Karejwa			
2012	Satyamev Jayate			
2013	Nagin			
2013	Rani No. 786	Rani		
2014	Inspector Chandni	Chandni		
2014	Bitiya Sada Suhaghan Rah			
2014	Rani Chali Sasural			
2014	Rowdy Rani	Rani		
2014	Sherni			
2014	Prem Deewani			
2014	Chandni			
2014	Ek Laila Teen Chaila			
2014	Dariya Dil			
2014	Bhagjogani			
2015	Dil Deewan Maane Na			
2015	Chhotki Dulhin			
2015	Dil Aur Deewar			
2015	Maai Ke Karz			
2015	Dulaara	Rani		
2015	Jaanam			
2015	Paayal	Paayal		
2015	Durga	Durga		
2015	Rani Banal Jwala	Jyoti		
2015	Don	Rani		
2016	Karz			
2016	Shiv Rakshak			
2016	Waqalat			
2016	Gharwali Baharwali			
2016	Main Rani Himmat Wali	Rani		
2016	Jodi No 1			
2016	Parshasan			
2016	Real Indian Mother			
2016	Devra Ishaqbaaz			
2016	Love aur Rajniti 2			
2016	Hum Hai Jodi No 1			
2017	Rangbaaj			
2017	Icchadhaari			
2017	Gundey			
2017	Rani Dilwar Jani			
2018	Yeh Ishq Bada Bedardi Hai			
2018	Sakhi Ke Biyah	Saloni		
2019	Aasra	Channi	Punjabi film	
2019	Kasam Durga Ki			
2019	Rani Weds Raja	Rani	Also playback singer	
2020	Chotki Thakurain			
2022	Babul Ki Galiyan			
2022	Lady Singham	Inspector		
2022	Goa Trip	Rani	Hindi film	
2023	Aangan ka Lakshmi			
2024	Badki Bahu Chotki Bahu	Sapna		
2025	Amma			
2025	Priya Beauty Parlour			
TBA	A Bad Man Babu †	TBA	Filming	
TBA	Pariwar Ke Babu †	TBA	Filming	
TBA	Bhabhi Maa †	TBA	Filming	
TBA	Naache Dulha Gali Gali †	TBA	Post-production	
TBA	Mera Pati Mera Devta Hai †	TBA	Completed	
TBA	Didi No. 1 †	TBA	Filming	
TBA	Saas Bahu Chali Swarg Lok †	TBA	Completed	
TBA	Chugalkhor Bahuriya		Trailer released	

=== Television ===
Year	Title	Role	Notes	Ref.
2013	Comedy Nights with Kapil	Herself	Guest	
2020	Khatron Ke Khiladi 10	Contestant	10th place	
2021	Crime Alert	Episodic role	Season 2	
2022	Sindoor Ki Keemat	Herself	Guest	
2022	The Kapil Sharma Show	Herself	Guest	
2023	Mast Mauli	Rajkumari Mahendra Singh		
2023–2024	Beti Hamari Anmol	Tatawali		

=== Web series ===
Year	Title	Role	Notes	Ref.
2020	Mastram	Raani		
2020	Virgin Bhasskar 2	Naika Patel		
2022	Gaachi	Gulab Jaan		
2022	Woh Pehla Pyar	Reema		

== Award and nominations ==
Year	Award	Category	Film	Result	Ref.
2010	Bhojpuri Film Awards	Best Actress	Umariya Kaili Tohre Naam	Nominated	
2011	Bhojpuri Film Awards	Best Actress	Devra Bada Satawela	Won	
2013	Bhojpuri Film Awards	Best Actress	Nagin	Won	
2014	Bhojpuri Film Awards	Best Actress	Prem Deewani	Won	
2015	Bhojpuri Film Awards	Best Actress	Dariya Dil	Nominated	
2015	Bhojpuri Film Awards	Best Popular Actress	—N/a	Won	
2016	Bhojpuri Film Awards	Best Popular Actress	—N/a	Won	
2016	Bhojpuri Film Awards	Best Actress	Real Indian Mother	Nominated	
2019	Bhojpuri Film Awards	Best Actress	Sakhi	Nominated	
2015	International Bhojpuri Film Awards	Best Popular Actress	—N/a	Won	
2017	International Bhojpuri Film Awards	Best Popular Actress	—N/a	Won	
2023	International Bhojpuri Film Awards	Social Media Queen	—N/a	Won	

== See also ==
- List of Bhojpuri actresses
