= 99.9 FM (film) =

- Poster
- Directed by: Sanjay Bhatia
- Written by: Umesh Patel (dialogues)
- Starring: Shawar Ali; Raima Sen; Dipannita Sharma
- Narrated by: Shawar Ali
- Cinematography: Nitin Sagar
- Edited by: Shekhar
- Production companies: 2 Gram Films; P.R Films
- Release date: 17 June 2005
- Running time: 90 minutes
- Country: India
- Language: Hindi
- Box office: ₹44,588 (US$470)

99.9 FM is a 2005 Indian film directed by Sanjay Bhatia and produced under the banners of 2 Gram Films and P.R. Films. The film stars Shawar Ali, Raima Sen, and Dipannita Sharma in lead roles. The film follows the plot of a radio jockey (Shawar), despite being married, who gets entangled in a love triangle with an air hostess.

== Plot ==
Gautam Singh (Shawar Ali) meets Sonali (Dipannita Sharma), an air hostess, and gradually he develops feelings for her. However, Sonali breaks up with Gautam, leaving him distressed and heartbroken. However, he meets Kim (Raima Sen) and marries her. Gautam is a radio jockey at a radio station named "99.9 FM" based in Mumbai. The couple's lives go well until Gautam meets Sonali again, re-awakening his love for her. Sonali proposes to Gautam to marry her and asks him to divorce Kim. However, a reluctant Gautam has no reason to divorce his wife, which makes Sonali upset, and she leaves Gautam. A devastated and helpless Gautam has no other option till the point where he makes up his mind to live with Sonali. He conspires against Kim and kills her with a revolver. Before killing Kim, Gautam had planned to elope with Sonali. But the guilt of killing his wife hurts his conscience, and he confesses it to Sonali. Sonali, who was waiting for Gautam, gets broken after the confession made by him. She walks away, and Gautam tries to evade the law by escaping from Mumbai and the police. However, the police arrest him on the highway, and he is sentenced to death for killing his wife. The next night shows Sonali being the new host of the channel in the place of Gautam.

== Cast ==
- Shawar Ali as Gautam Singh
- Raima Sen as Kim Singh
- Dipannita Sharma as Sonali
- Rajkumar Kanojia
- Jaipreet Nagra

== Soundtrack ==
99.9 FM

Soundtrack album by Various Artists
- Released: June 2004
- Recorded: 1998–2004
- Genre: Feature film soundtrack
- Language: Hindi
- Label: EMI Records

Track list
No.	Title	Music	Singer(s)	Length
1.	"Kate Nahin Raat"	Salim-Sulaiman	Ustad Sultan Khan	5:28
2.	"Nirvana"	Biddu	Biddu	5:11
3.	"Kesariya"		Zila Khan	5:34
4.	"Intezaar"		Shubha Mudgal	4:09
5.	"Tanha Dil"		Shaan	4:53
6.	"Sau Feesadi"		Usha Uthup	4:00
7.	"Raindance"		Sum	4:47
8.	"Sanoon Ek Pal"		Nusrat Fateh Ali Khan	5:21
9.	"Muskurayee Jaa"		Zoheb Hassan	5:41
10.	"Movement"		Sum	5:03
11.	"Is Pal"	Shantanu Moitra	Shubha Mudgal	5:47
12.	"Tum Na Aaye To Har Cheez"		Zia Mohyeddin	2:22
13.	"Gumsum Ho Kyun"	Shaan	Shaan	4:41
14.	"Yeh Mujhe Azzez Bhi Aur Napasand"		Zia Mohyeddin	2:08
15.	"Chori Chori"		Shubha Mudgal	4:37
16.	"Jo Bhaje Hari Ko Sada"		Bhimsen Joshi	6:27
17.	"Theme"		Instrumental	2:56

== Review ==
Taran Adarsh from Bollywood Hungama rated the film 1 out of 5 and criticised the film for having a "lifeless script" and stated "99.9 FM is a poor show all the way."
