= Polvoron video =

2024 video of Bongbong Marcos

- Screencap of the video
- Date: July 22, 2024
- Type: Video
- Target: Bongbong Marcos
- First reporter: Claire Contreras ("Maharlika") in Boldyakan Facebook page
- Filmed by: Unknown
- Outcome: Found to be a deepfake by government and independent fact checking bodies; Contreras alias "Maharlika" insists without evidence that the video was supported by a California-based forensic expert.
- Accused: Maharlika; Harry Roque
- Charges: see below

The polvoron video is a video published on July 22, 2024, purportedly depicting Philippine President Bongbong Marcos snorting cocaine. The video has been found to be deepfake by both Philippine government law agencies and independent fact checking bodies.

== Background ==
The polvoron video depicts a man, allegedly President Bongbong Marcos sniffing a white powdery substance. This substance is suggested to be cocaine, or euphemistically polvoron.

== History ==
Claire Contreras, a vlogger who goes by the alias "Maharlika" first teased the existence of the polvoron video during a livestream on the Facebook page Boldyakan during the evening of July 21, 2024. Harry Roque in Canada asserted to the Hakbang ng Maisug supporters that the upcoming video is "not AI" and "underwent authentication".

Maharlika published the video abroad on July 22, 2024, at the Hakbang ng Maisug event in Los Angeles, California on the same date the 2024 State of the Nation Address was set to be held in Quezon City. The event was attended by allies of former president Rodrigo Duterte such as Roque himself and former candidate for senator, Glenn Chong.

On August 25, Maharlika published a higher quality version of the video on her vlog.

== Verification ==
=== Government agencies ===
Interior Secretary Benhur Abalos ordered the creation of a special task force to investigate the video. He chided the release of the video's release in the United States questioning the video's propagators' credibility viewing it as a way to avoid liability in Philippine law.

On July 23, 2024, the Cybercrime Offices of the National Bureau of Investigation (NBI) and the Philippine National Police released their findings that the man of the video is "definitely not" President Marcos, noting the discrepancies of the facial features of the man in the video and Marcos.

=== News organizations ===
Rappler ran a copy of the video under a tool called SensityAI which gave a result that there is 81.8% confidence that a face swap was done on the video, publishing a fact checking article on July 25, 2024.

Vera Files published their own fact checking on September 16. The organization had the video verified, including the higher quality version published on August 25, with the Deepfakes Analysis Unit (DAU) of the India-based Misinformation Combat Alliance which analyzed the video, highly suspecting it to have been manipulated through artificial intelligence. DAU says that there are indications that a face swap manipulation was done.

The Presidential Communications Office released a statement reaffirming the statement that the video is fake citing the Vera Files report.

=== Maharlika ===
Maharlika discussed the verification process she made on the video on August 12 on her vlog. She did not specify any specific program or mention the identities of the forensic experts she consulted with. Maharlika disputed the findings of Philippine government agents. In an appearance at Apollo Quiboloy-owned Sonshine Media Network International (SMNI) she said she sought evidence the video was "untampered" showing a printed report confirming such from five tests from an unknown source.

== Legal actions ==
In September 2024, Harry Roque has been reported to face a pending disbarment petition filed by former TransCo head, Melvin Matibag. Matibag refused to divulge any details but cited Roque's social media posts that included a polvoron video of President Bongbong Marcos allegedly snorting drugs. Roque stated his social media post of the video "is protected by free speech under the privilege doctrine" and added that Marcos has not admitted nor denied the allegations in the video.

The NBI filed charges against Roque and Maharlika for the polvoron video in April 2025. The following are the charges:

- Maharlika – Unlawful use of means of publication and unlawful utterances, inciting to sedition, cyber libel, and computer-related forgery
- Harry Roque – Inciting to sedition

This followed vlogger Pebbles Cunanan's appearance in a House of Representatives Tri Committee inquiry on fake news, where the internet personality said she is convinced that Roque spread the video.
