= Ann Matibag =

Filipina politician

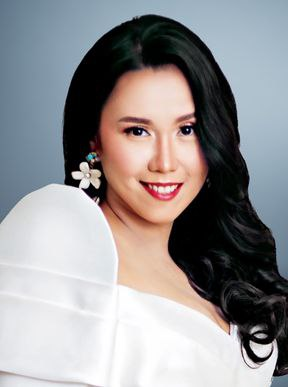
- Official portrait, 2025

Member of the Philippine House of Representatives from Laguna's 1st congressional district
- Incumbent
- Assumed office June 30, 2022
- Preceded by: Danilo Fernandez

Member of the Laguna Provincial Board from the 1st District
- In office June 30, 2019 – June 30, 2022

Personal details
- Born: Ma. Rene Ann Lourdes Garcia; January 26, 1984 (age 42) Quezon City, Philippines
- Party: PFP (2026–present)
- Other political affiliations: Lakas (2023–2026); PDP–Laban (2018–2023)
- Spouse: Melvin Matibag
- Children: 3
- Education: San Beda College Alabang (JD)
- Occupation: Politician

Maria Rene Ann Lourdes Garcia Matibag (born January 26, 1984) is a Filipino politician who has served as the representative from Laguna's first district since 2022. She previously represented the district on the Laguna Provincial Board from 2019 until 2022.

Matibag is married to Melvin Matibag, a lawyer who became a faction leader in the PDP–Laban during an intraparty dispute in 2021 and later became director of the National Bureau of Investigation.
