= Lingo (VoIP Service operator) =

American telecommunications company

Lingo Management, LLC
- Company type: Limited Liability Company (LLC)
- Industry: Telecommunications
- Founded: 2018
- Headquarters: Southfield, Michigan
- Key people: Ananth Veluppillai (President & CEO)
- Products: Voice & broadband services
- Revenue: Projected $135 million
- Number of employees: 150–200
- Website: www.lingo.com

Lingo Management, LLC "Lingo" was founded by Vincent M. Oddo, and partners, in 2018 as a voice and broadband provider based in Macon, Georgia and headquartered in Atlanta, Georgia. Lingo is a global Cloud/UC and managed service provider providing IP-based voice and data, mobile services, and other managed services to the Business, Carrier, and Consumer markets. The Lingo name originates from the Lingo VoIP product line which operated under the Primus Telecommunications brand and later transitioned into a product line of Birch Communications with the acquisition of Primus Telecommunications in 2013. In May 2018, Birch Communications divided into two completely separate companies led by Fusion Telecommunications International, Inc. acquiring the Birch enterprise customer sectors. The remaining customer base formed what is now Lingo Communications, LLC or simply Lingo.

In December 2018, Lingo finalized the acquisition of Impact Telecom, LLC "Impact" based out of Irving, TX. The Impact acquisition included its customers, operations, and network infrastructure. The merger of Lingo and Impact creates a leading global telecom and managed service provider, with approximately 250,000 SMB, Carrier, and Consumer customers.

On November 30, 2020, Lingo closed on the acquisition of Lingo of Kentucky, LLC and Tempo Telecom, LLC. Lingo also announced a recapitalization transaction sponsored by B. Riley Principal Investments, LLC (a subsidiary of financial services company B. Riley Financial, Inc.).

== Product Offering ==
Cloud PBX
Call Center Solutions
Broadband
Traditional Voice (POTS)
VoIP
Long Distance
Toll-Free
SIP/PRI/T1
Video Conferencing
Web Collaboration
Managed Services

== Controversies ==
=== Deepfakes ===
Prior to the 2024 New Hampshire Democratic presidential primary election, a Lingo user transmitted deepfake robocalls spoofing the voice of President Joe Biden, encouraging voters to not cast a ballot in the primary.
