= Bruno Sartori =

Brazilian comedian and influencer

- Born: Bruno Donizeti Sartori; May 16, 1989 (age 37); Iturama, Minas Gerais, Brazil

Comedy career
- Genres: humour; deepfake; parody; political satire; artificial intelligence

Bruno Donizati Sartori (Iturama, May 16, 1989), also known as Bruxo dos Vídeos (Wizard of Videos), is a Brazilian journalist, comedian and influencer marketing considered one of the pioneers in creating satires through the deepfake technique in Brazil. Sartori has gained notoriety with videos that satirize public entities such as Jair Bolsonaro, Sergio Moro, and Lula.

== History ==
Bruno Sartori was born in Iturama, in the state of Minas Gerais, on May 16, 1989. At the age of four, he moved to the city of Unaí, where he spent his childhood. In this same city, he started working as a videomaker at the age of 15 with the production of humoristic content such as parodies and materials focused on the city's politics. After finishing high school in Unaí, at the age of 19, he moved to São José do Rio Preto in search of higher education, where he has an incomplete degree in Journalism and Law.

Sartori learned about the deepfake technology on the Reddit forum in late 2017 and subsequently added the technique to his work to improve the confection of the humorous content produced, where he became popular for his satires involving national politics, which gained notoriety after his video "Chapolin Bolsonaro" went viral on the social networks in May 2019. In the video that had millions of views, the president of Brazil, Jair Bolsonaro, appears characterized with the classic costume of the El Chapulín Colorado character and saying some wrong phrases that were said by the political entity in Dallas, in the United States.

In 2020, he was quoted by The Economist newspaper because of another video that also went viral on social networks. In the video, Jair Bolsonaro appears singing the song I Will Always Love You, in Whitney Houston's version, where he serenades former US President Donald Trump (a satire alluding to the Brazilian president's excessive affection for Trump).

In 2021, Sartori participated in the third edition of the Marte Festival alongside well-known names in the arts.

== Pioneering with Deepfake ==
Bruno Sartori is a videomaker and has become a pioneer with deepfakes technology through parodies and humor videos. Some of his most famous work using the technique of synthesizing human images or sounds with artificial intelligence involves rendering videos from famous TV series such as El Chavo del Ocho and El Chapulín Colorado; of classic scenes from Brazilian telenovelas such as Tieta and Avenida Brasil; and music clips from Whitney Houston's and Mariah Carey's works in the making of satires. Sartori claims to have already been sought out by representatives of political parties to demoralize some public figures. By the result of the montages with deepfakes, he was quoted in The Economist newspaper in 2020:

"What Brazilians are watching: A video showing Jair Bolsonaro, Brazil’s president, serenading Donald Trump with the classic ballad “I Will Always Love You” has been viewed hundreds of thousands of times online. But the footage isn’t real. It was made by Bruno Sartori, a self-described “deepfaker” and journalist who uses artificial intelligence to superimpose one person’s face and voice onto another's to mock Brazil’s political elite. Sartori has targeted other politicians too. To those who think deepfakes erode trust in the media and civil society, Sartori responds that he is trying to puncture politician's pomposity and power with one of democracy's oldest weapons: satire." — The Economist.
