= Mast Mauli =

Indian drama television series

- Genre: Drama
- Created by: Vikas Seth; Alind Srivastava; Nisar Parvez; Mahesh Pandey
- Written by: Shivendra (Dialogue)
- Screenplay by: Mahesh Pandey; Vikram Khurana
- Story by: Mahesh Pandey
- Directed by: Sangeetha Rao; Ismail Umar Khan; Yogesh Kumar Ojha
- Creative directors: Ishan Rana; Ishika Sahani
- Starring: Shagun Singh; Rani Chatterjee; Mohit Sonkar; Shawar Ali
- Theme music composer: Yesha Gaur; Punit Dixit
- Opening theme: "Hey, Mast Mauli Re... Mast Mauli"
- Country of origin: India
- Original language: Hindi
- No. of seasons: 1
- No. of episodes: 90

Production
- Cinematography: Shahid Khan; Vedu Prasad Pandey
- Editor: Ganga Kaachrla
- Camera setup: Multi-camera
- Running time: 22-24 minutes
- Production company: Mandala Talkies Production

Original release
- Network: Dangal TV
- Release: 23 January – 6 May 2023

Mast Mauli (transl. Cool Mauli) is an Indian Hindi soap opera starring Shagun Singh, Shawar Ali and Mohit Sonkar. The show was premiered 23 January 2023, and it was aired on Dangal TV under the banner of Mandala Talkies production. The final episode was broadcast on 6 May 2023.

== Plot ==
Mahendra Pratap Singh, a famous Thakur lives with his wife Sudha and his family in Varanasi. Sudha dies during their child's birth. So Mahendra blames their daughter for his wife's death. But her aunt raised the child and named her Mauli.

=== 18 years later ===
Mauli, grows into a beautiful, well raised woman. But till now her father still hates her. Mauli lives with her grandmother, stepmother, who try their best to reunite Mauli and father. Mauli desires her father's love.

== Cast ==
- Shagun Singh as Mauli Mahendra Singh: Mahendra and Sudha's daughter, Rajkumari's adoptive daughter, Bihaan's love interest (2023)
- Shawar Ali as Mahendra Pratap Singh: Sudha's widower, Rajkumari second husband, Mauli's father (2023)
- Rani Chatterjee as Rajkumari Mahendra Singh: Mahendra's second wife; Mauli's adoptive mother (2023)
- Mohit Sonkar as Bihaan: Mauli's love interest (2023)
- Prachi Pathak as Mauli's aunt (later mother-in-law) (2023)
- Hardika Joshi as Naina: wife of Deepak, elder brother of Bihan
- Akshita Arora as Daadi: Mahendra's mother, Mauli's grandmother, Sudha and Rajkumari's mother-in-law (2023)
- Navneet Srivastava as Deepak: Vihaan's brother (2023)
- Krishna Kant Singh Bundela as Panditji (2023)
- Aashish Singh as Rohan (2023)
- Omkar Machindra Shingare as Chandan
- Neetu Sangla as Preeti
- Shivanshi Das as Bharkha: Bihan's friend
- Shefali rana as Rohan's mother (2023)
- Ravi Yadav as Kedar Pandey: father of Bihan

=== Cameo appearances ===
- Sonal Khilwani as Bindiya Abhay Bharadwaj from Bindiya Sarkar (2023)

Ayaz khan as negative

== Production ==
The series was announced by Mandala Talkies for Dangal TV in December 2022. Shagun Singh and Mohit Sonkar were signed as the lead. Rani Chatterjee is cast to portray a negative role. The promos featuring the leads was released in January 2023. The show was released in January 23. The show went off air on 6 May 2023 without an ending.

== See also ==
- List of programmes broadcast by Dangal TV
