= Melvin Matibag =

Filipino lawyer and Director of the National Bureau of Investigation since 2025

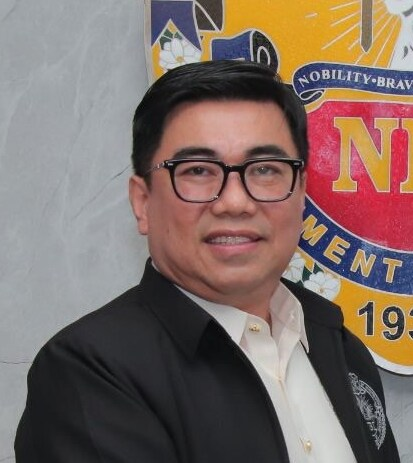
- Matibag in 2026

29th Director of the National Bureau of Investigation
- Incumbent
- Assumed office April 20, 2026
- President: Bongbong Marcos
- Preceded by: Jaime Santiago

Cabinet Secretary of the Philippines
- Acting
- In office March 8, 2022 – June 30, 2022
- President: Rodrigo Duterte
- Preceded by: Karlo Nograles
- Succeeded by: Office abolished (next held by Benhur Abalos)

President and CEO of National Transmission Corporation
- In office January 2017 – March 9, 2022
- Preceded by: Generoso M. Senal (OIC)
- Succeeded by: Jainal Abidin Y. Bahjin II

Personal details
- Born: Melvin Alvarez Matibag
- Party: Independent (2023–present)
- Other political affiliations: PDP (2017–2023); NPC (2012–2013); Lakas (2003–2004)
- Spouse: Ann Garcia
- Education: University of Santo Tomas (BA); Ateneo de Manila University (LLB); Wayne State University (LL.M)
- Profession: Lawyer

Melvin Alvarez Matibag is a Filipino lawyer who currently serves as Director of the National Bureau of Investigation (NBI) since April 2026. A former cabinet secretary of President Rodrigo Duterte, he was previously instrumental in the ouster of Senator Koko Pimentel as chairman of Duterte's PDP-Laban, of which he served as secretary general from 2021 to 2023.

== Early life and education ==
Matibag graduated in Ateneo de Manila University College of Law in 1996, and passed Bar Exam in 1997.

== Duterte administration and PDP–Laban leadership (2017-2023) ==
Being a PDP–Laban stalwart, he was appointed president and CEO of National Transmission Corporation (TransCo) under the Duterte administration in 2017, with Matibag remembering president Duterte's instructions to him and other appointees as encapsulating his main principle in governance: when faced with "contentious issues", always do the right thing and strive to make people's lives comfortable. Matibag later became acting Cabinet Secretary in 2022. As president of TransCo, he led the Public Education Network-Communications Infrastructure for Learning (PEN-CIL) project that would address the challenges of Department of Education (DepEd) in ensuring the continuity of learning amid the pandemic and the expected transition to the New Normal by providing Internet connectivity in all public schools, with improving power line infrastructure.

He also served as PDP–Laban's secretary general from 2021 until 2023.

== Return to private practice (2023-2026) ==
Matibag resigned as the secretary-general of PDP–Laban in 2023, citing a divergence between his personal principles and the party's direction. He further stated that his departure was intended to prevent potential conflicts of interest arising from his wife's affiliation with a separate political party.

Following his departure from government and party politics in late 2023, he returned to private legal practice and academia, serving as the inaugural Dean of the newly established College of Law at the Lyceum of Alabang.

Matibag subsequently became an opinion columnist for the Daily Tribune, frequently writing commentaries regarding Vice President Sara Duterte. In an October 2023 column, he voiced opposition to the allocation of Confidential and Intelligence Funds (CIF) to the Office of the Vice President, arguing that the Constitution does not mandate duties to the office that justify such expenditures. At the time, Matibag clarified that his arguments focused strictly on institutional policy rather than a personal critique of Duterte.

However, his tone shifted in subsequent pieces; in a September 2024 column, Matibag openly criticized the Vice President, referring to her as a "bratinella" (spoiled brat). Following Duterte’s controversial livestreamed press conference in November of that year, which eventually formed a key component of her impeachment proceedings, Matibag published another opinion piece addressing her conduct. a key component of her impeachment proceedings—Matibag published another opinion piece addressing her conduct.

He filed a disbarment case against Harry Roque due to the latter's accusation against President Bongbong Marcos of having a video in which Marcos is using illegal drugs.

== National Bureau of Investigation (since 2026) ==
In April 2026, he was appointed as the new director of National Bureau of Investigation taking over from Angelito Magno who was the Officer-in-Charge (OIC) after the resignation of the previous appointee, Jaime Santiago. As director, he led the arrest of former journalist Jay Sonza due to allegations of spreading fake news on President Marcos' health status. Matibag also stated that Vice President Sara Duterte attempted to visit Ramil Madriaga, the former's security aide and alleged "bagman".

After the Senate changed its leadership in May 11, 2026, the NBI led the operation that resulted to failed arrest of Ronald dela Rosa, as International Criminal Court (ICC) issued an arrest warrant against dela Rosa. But the NBI agents who are in the said operations were cited in contempt by the Senate after the surveillance footages were presented at the plenary.

In July 2026, Matibag served as the final witness for the House prosecution panel during the Senate impeachment trial of Vice President Sara Duterte, specifically testifying on Article IV of the Articles of Impeachment. This article centered on allegations that Duterte made grave threats and participated in an active plot against the lives of President Bongbong Marcos, First Lady Liza Araneta Marcos, and former Speaker Martin Romualdez. Taking the stand as the Director of the National Bureau of Investigation (NBI), Matibag presented findings from an NBI special task force, stating that the bureau viewed Duterte's remarks as a matter of national security and identified potential persons of interest linked to a plot. He maintained that the Vice President's statements constituted a direct threat rather than mere rhetoric and suggested a possible conspiracy involving other political figures. During cross-examination, defense counsel challenged Matibag's testimony as hearsay due to his lack of personal involvement in the initial 2024 investigation, while also citing potential bias given his wife's endorsement of the impeachment resolution and his past critical opinion columns; Matibag rejected these claims, asserting that his official duties remained strictly independent of his spouse's legislative role.

In September 2026, Matibag announced that the bureau had filed a complaint for qualified human trafficking before the Department of Justice against Batangas 1st District Representative Leandro Leviste, former lawmaker Jacinto Paras, and five others. The charges stemmed from an alleged "honey trap" operation intended to set up Executive Secretary Ralph Recto through coerced sexual services and drug allegations to induce a character assassination. Following an NBI entrapment operation that rescued female entertainment talents and led to the arrest of a talent manager, the NBI concluded that the scheme involved a plan to fabricate criminal accusations against Recto. Matibag stated that the NBI had compiled complete evidence against the seven individuals and was also considering initiating an ethics complaint against Leviste in the House of Representatives as well as disbarment proceedings against the involved attorneys.

== Personal life ==
His wife is Ann Matibag, who serves as the representative for the 1st district of Laguna in the Philippine House of Representatives.
