= Shawar Ali =

Indian film actor and model

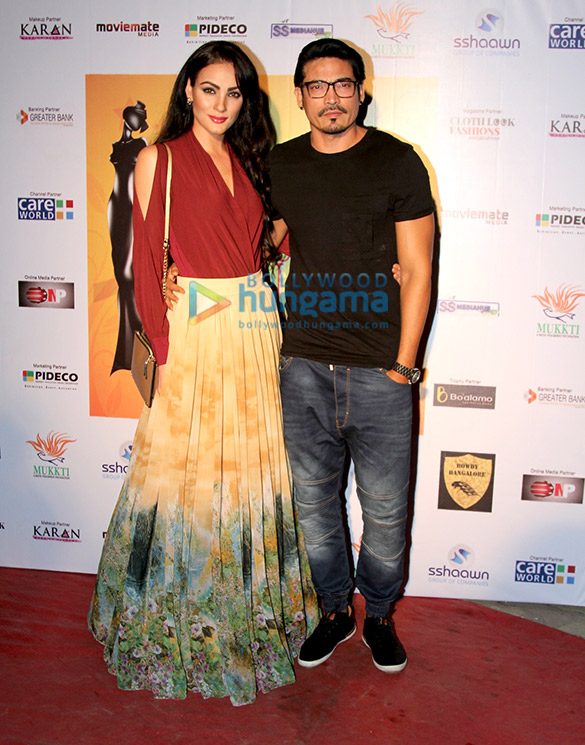
- Shawar Ali (right) and his then wife Marcela in 2016
- Born: Bhopal, Madhya Pradesh, India
- Occupation(s): Actor, model
- Years active: 2004 — present
- Spouse: Marcela Ayesha (m. 2015; div. 2018)

Shahwar Ali is an Indian actor and model who appears primarily in Bollywood, Tollywood and Sandalwood films.

== Early life and career ==
Sarwar Ali was born and raised in Bhopal, Madhya Pradesh. His father was a farmer in Bhopal. He shifted to Mumbai in 2000. He worked as a ramp model for the fashion brand Calvin Klein for three months in 2002 before joining the film industry. His debut film was Asambhav released in 2004, where he acted alongside Arjun Rampal and Priyanka Chopra.

In 1998, he won an award in Mr. India under "Best Physique category".

== Filmography ==
=== Films ===
| Year | Film | Role | Language |
|---|---|---|---|
| 2004 | Hawas | Raj Mittal | Hindi |
| 2004 | Asambhav | Rafiq Mabroz | Hindi |
| 2004 | Ab... Bas! | Karan Malhotra | Hindi |
| 2005 | 99.9 FM | Gautam Singh | Hindi |
| 2005 | Khamoshh... Khauff Ki Raat | Senior Inspector Jatin | Hindi |
| 2005 | Fareb | Undercover officer | Hindi |
| 2007 | Om Shanti Om | Himself (cameo) | Hindi |
| 2009 | Runway | David | Hindi |
| 2009 | Rechipo | Shakur Ahmed | Telugu |
| 2010 | Golimaar | Talwar | Telugu |
| 2011 | Bbuddah... Hoga Terra Baap | Anju | Hindi |
| 2012 | Naa Ishtam | Salim Bhai | Telugu |
| 2012 | Mere Dost Picture Abhi Baki Hai | Hero | Hindi |
| 2012 | Paanch Ghantey Mien Paanch Crore | Vikram | Hindi |
| 2012 | Department | Gangster | Hindi |
| 2013 | Iddarammayilatho | Shawar | Telugu |
| 2014 | Action Jackson | Nawab | Hindi |
| 2015 | Monsoon | — | Hindi |
| 2015 | Four Pillars of Basement | Jiju | Hindi |
| 2015 | Rebel | Shawar Ali | Kannada |
| 2016 | Dictator | | Telugu |
| 2016 | Fattu Saala | | Hindi |
| 2017 | Chakravarthy | Bombay Diwan | Kannada |
| 2021 | Wild Dog | Bomzan | Telugu |
| 2023 | Bhola Shankar | Charles (Alexander's brother) | Telugu |

=== Television ===
- Power Couple
- Amma
- Mast Mauli
