= Sasura Bada Paisawala =

2003 Indian Bhojpuri-language film

- Directed by: Ajay Sinha
- Written by: Vinay Bihari (song lyrics)
- Produced by: Sudhakar Pandey
- Starring: Manoj Tiwari; Rani Chatterjee
- Music by: Lal Sinha
- Distributed by: Balaji Cinevision Pvt Ltd
- Release date: 2003
- Running time: 164 minutes
- Country: India
- Language: Bhojpuri
- Budget: ₹35−40 lakh
- Box office: ₹4.5−9 crore

Sasura Bada Paisawala (transl. "My father-in-law, the rich guy") is a 2003 Indian Bhojpuri-language romance-drama film directed by Ajay Sinha, starring Manoj Tiwari and Rani Chatterjee. The film, released in 2003, cost about ₹30 lakhs to make, and was the highest grossing Bhojpuri film at that time. This film is considered a landmark that helped in the revival of Bhojpuri cinema in the mid-2000s.

As of June 2022, the film is still the highest-grossing Bhojpuri film of history.

== Plot ==
A boy meets a girl, and they fall in love, they decide to marry against opposition, leading to fighting and reconciliation.

== Cast ==
- Manoj Tiwari as Raja
- Rani Chatterjee as Rani
- Balkar Singh Bali as Chhedi

== Soundtrack ==
The soundtrack of the movie is directed by Lal Sinha. This was the first movie of Sinha. Lal Sinha, from Gaya, Bihar, came to Mumbai in 2001 and started struggling as music director. Sinha had a very good relation with singer Shreya Ghoshal. When Sinha got the film, he requested Ghoshal to sing in his film. In the beginning, Shreya was not ready to sing Bhojpuri songs. But when she heard the compositions of music director Sinha, she immediately agreed to sing for Sinha. And this became the first Bhojpuri film of Ghoshal. The lyrics were penned by Vinay Bihari, and is labelled by T-Series.

Songs	Singer(s)
"Bhola Hamse Imtihan Le Lee"	Shreya Ghoshal, Pradeep Pandit
"Chali Gayil Dumraanv Balmuva"	Kalpana Patowary
"Chumma Na Debu Je Sarkar"	Udit Narayan, Deepa Narayan Jha
"Dilwa Mangele Gamcha Bichayiae"	Kalpana Patowary
"Hum Hayin Gaanv Ke Chora"	Priya Bhattacharya, Manoj Tiwari
"Jaan Se Badke Hum Tohra Ke Jaanile"	Udit Narayan, Shreya Ghoshal
"Jabse Chadal Bayisaakhiya"	Vinay Bihari, Radheshyam Rasiya
"Ladki Hay Haayi Bholtejwali"	Manoj Tiwari, Laal Sinha
"Mehri Aayi Rob Chalayi"	Priya Bhattacharya, Khushboo Jain, Manoj Tiwari, Shweta Sharma
"Sasura Bada Paisawala"	Priya Bhattacharya, Soham, Vinay Bihari, Monu
"Tohra Bin Jee Naa Sakilen"	Shreya Ghoshal, Manoj Tiwari

== Box office ==
The film was successful at the box office, grossing an estimated ₹4.5−9 crore (US$−930,000) against a budget of ₹35−40 lakh (US$−42,000). According to some reports, this film got screens for four to five months continuously, and all are houseful.

== Sequel ==
A sequel of film, named "Sasura Bada Paisawala 2", was released on 21 February 2020.
