= Tanha Dil =

2000 single by Shaan

Single by Shaan

from the album Tanha Dil
- Language: Hindi
- Released: 2 January 2000 (original version)
- Recorded: 1999
- Genre: Pop
- Length: 4:55
- Label: Virgin
- Composers: Ram Sampath, Shaan
- Lyricist: Shaan

Music video
- Tanha Dil on YouTube

"Tanha Dil" (transl. Lonely heart) is a song by Indian singer Shaan, the first track on his 2000 album Tanha Dil. The song was written and sung by Shaan, and composed by Ram Sampath. It was originally released as a single on 2 January 2000. In 2019, Shaan stated that "Tanha Dil will remain my all-time greatest hit" The song was sampled by British singer Melanie C for her song "Yeh Yeh Yeh".

== "Tanha Dil Tanha Safar" ==
A reworked version of "Tanha Dil" was released on 19 November 2021. This version of the song was "completely different" from the original, with a focus on mental health.
