= MrDeepFakes =

Defunct deepfake pornography website

Logo

MrDeepFakes was a deepfake pornography website which was active between 2018 and 2025. It became one of the biggest websites in this category before its closure in May 2025 following an investigative journalism operation by multiple publications.

== History ==
MrDeepFakes was established in 2018 following the forced closure of a Reddit discussion board dedicated to sharing deepfaked sexual content of public figures. The website was one of the most popular providers of deepfake pornography, with 12 million monthly active users as of November 2023. It started blocking traffic from the United Kingdom in April 2024 following proposed legislation which aimed to outlaw production of deepfake material without the consent of those featured.

=== Investigations and closure ===
In March 2024, the open-source intelligence investigation company Sidenty identified the owner of the website as David Do, who reduced his social media presence after the Dutch newspaper Algemeen Dagblad contacted him regarding an article about MrDeepFakes and the investigation.

It closed on May 4, 2025, blaming an unspecified "critical service provider" which stopped working with the website. following an investigative journalism operation which involved CBC News, Bellingcat, Politiken and TjekDet. Do was later placed on leave from his role as a pharmacist and had reportedly left the organization shortly after.

In May 2025, Søren Søndergaard, a member of the Danish Folketing, sent a request to the Minister of Justice Peter Hummelgaard for Do to be extradited to Denmark. In August 2025, members of the Dutch House of Representatives urged for his extradition to the Netherlands, with Caroline van der Plas describing material on the site featuring her likeness as "like [being] digitally raped".

In September 2025, Antonio Rotondo, a prolific former user based in Australia, was fined A$343,500 in addition to legal fees by the eSafety Commissioner.

== Features ==
In addition to images and videos of deepfake pornography, the website had a forum where users could order custom-made videos to be generated by other members in exchange for money. While many were of public figures, the British edition of GQ reported on the creation of deepfake material containing the likeness of an individual known to a user.
