= Manoj Tiwari (Delhi politician) =

Indian politician, singer and actor (born 1971)

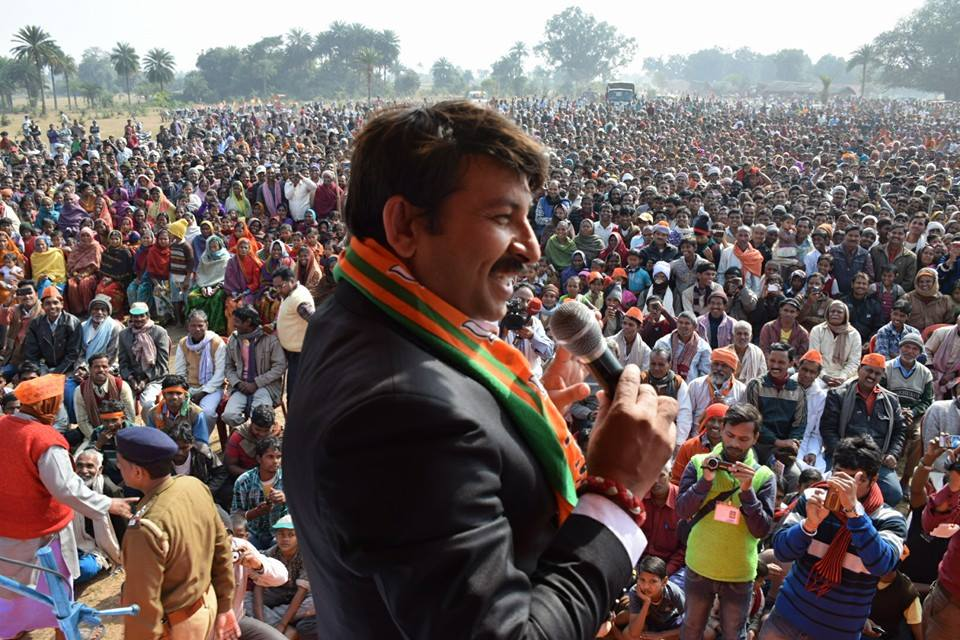
- Tiwari campaigning in 2019

Member of Parliament, Lok Sabha
- Incumbent
- Assumed office 16 May 2014
- Preceded by: Jai Prakash Agarwal
- Constituency: North East Delhi, Delhi

President of Bharatiya Janata Party, Delhi
- In office 30 November 2016 – 2 June 2020
- President: Amit Shah
- Preceded by: Satish Upadhyay
- Succeeded by: Adesh Kumar Gupta

Personal details
- Born: Manoj Kumar Tiwari; 1 February 1971 (age 55) Varanasi, Uttar Pradesh, India
- Party: Bharatiya Janata Party (since 2014)
- Other political affiliations: Samajwadi Party (till 2011)
- Spouses: Rani Tiwari (m. 1999; div. 2012) Surbhi Tiwari (m. 2020)
- Children: 3
- Education: Banaras Hindu University (MPEd)
- Occupation: Actor; singer; director; television presenter; politician

Manoj Kumar Tiwari (born 1 February 1971) is an Indian politician, singer and actor. He is serving as a Member of Parliament from North East Delhi since 2014. Tiwari contested the 2009 general election as a Samajwadi Party candidate from Gorakhpur Lok Sabha but lost to Yogi Adityanath. In 2014, he joined Bharatiya Janata Party and contested in 2014 Indian general elections and won. He was appointed as Delhi BJP president in 2016. He was the head of the BJP organisation in Delhi when the party recorded a record victory in 2017 MCD elections.

== Early life ==
Born on 1 February 1971 in Kabir Chaura locality of Varanasi in Uttar Pradesh, Tiwari is one of the six children of Chandradev Tiwari and Lalita Devi. He is from Atarwalia, a small village in Kaimur district of Bihar. Tiwari completed his M.P.Ed. degree from Banaras Hindu University.

== Career ==
Prior to his involvement in politics, he had spent years as a singer and an actor in the Bhojpuri film industry.

In 2003, he took a role in the film Sasura Bada Paisawala. He followed this with the films Daroga Babu I Love You and Bandhan Toote Na.

The BBC reported in 2005 that Tiwari and Ravi Kishan were the biggest male stars in the Bhojpuri cinema market and that Tiwari charged around US$ 90,000 per film.

Manoj Tiwari also sang "Jiya Ho Bihar Ke Lala Jiya Tu Haazar Sala" in Gangs of Wasseypur.

== Politics ==
In 2009, Tiwari contested elections for the 15th Lok Sabha as a candidate for the Samajwadi Party in the Gorakhpur constituency. He had been offered a choice of three constituencies and Zee News reported him as saying that he was not "a political person but was concerned for the development of Purvanchal region of Uttar Pradesh." He lost to Yogi Adityanath.

His house in Mumbai was allegedly attacked in November 2009 by an irate mob about remarks that they claimed he had made about Shiv Sena. Tiwari denied the allegations.

In January 2011 Mid-Day reported that the BJP might invite him to join their party and that the association with him would assist their electoral efforts among North Indians. Tiwari dismissed the story as being hypothetical, although he would consider his options should an invitation emerge. He had been seen with BJP leaders at an event and had expressed admiration for Shatrughan Sinha, the BJP MP for Patna Sahib.

Tiwari was active in the 2011 Indian anti-corruption movement and supported Ramdev's hunger strike at the Ramlila Ground protests and protested the arrest of Anna Hazare.

He went on to win the North East Delhi (Lok Sabha constituency) in the 2014 Indian general elections from BJP. He defeated the AAP candidate with a margin of 1,44,084 votes.

In 2019 general elections, Tiwari, a BJP candidate won against Indian National Congress candidate Sheila Dikshit in the North East Delhi constituency of Delhi by a margin of 3.63 lakh votes.

The Delhi government had decided to stop the production, storage, sale, and use of all types of firecrackers to reduce the rising levels of pollution in Delhi. In September 2022, Tiwari moved to the Supreme Court against the Delhi government. Tiwari said that that freedom of religion cannot be taken away under the pretext of the right to life. The Supreme Court refused to provide an early hearing for the petition and dismissed the plea saying, "Let people breathe clean air". The Supreme Court also asked the public to use the money on sweets instead of crackers.

In the 2024 General Elections, Manoj Tiwari retained the North East Delhi Lok Sabha seat, defeating former JNU Student Union President and Congress candidate Kanhaiya Kumar by a margin of 138,778 votes.

== Personal life ==
Manoj Tiwari married his first wife Rani Tiwari in 1999. They have a daughter together named Rhiti. In 2011, Manoj and Rani were involved in divorce proceedings, after 11 years of marriage. They divorced in 2012.

He later married Surbhi, with whom he has two daughters. The first daughter born on 30 December 2020 and second on 12 December 2022.

== Discography ==
Year	Song(s)	Title (Movie/Album/TV shows)
2002	"Chat Deni Maar Deli"	Non-album single
2006	"Choda Marda Sehar Ki Baat"	Dehati Babu
2012	"Jiya Tu Bihar Ke Lala"	Gangs of Wasseypur
2024	"Hind Ke Sitara"	Panchayat

== Filmography ==
Year	Title	Role	Ref
2003	Sasura Bada Paisawala	Raja	
2004	Daroga Babu I Love You		
2004	Humke Maafi Dei Da		
2005	Bandhan Toote Na	Kishan	
2005	Dharti Putra		
2006	Raja Thakur		
2006	Dharti Kahe Pukar Ke	Arjun	
2006	Damadji		
2006	Dehati Babu	Mangru	
2006	Ganga	Bajrangi	
2007	Naihar Ke Maado Piya Ke Chunari		
2007	Munna Pandey Berojgaar		
2007	Tu Hamaar Hau		
2007	Janam Janam Ke Saath		
2007	Gangotri: Ganga 2	Bajrangi	
2008	Bhole Shankar	Bhole	
2008	International Daroga		
2008	Deshdrohi	Shekhar	
2008	Ae Bhouji Ke Sister		
2011	Elaan		
2013	Gobar Singh		
2014	Devra Bhail Deewana		
2018	Yadav Pan Bhandar		

== Television ==
Year	Name	Role	Channel	Notes	Ref
2010	Bigg Boss 4	Contestant	Colors TV	Evicted Day 63 (9th place)	
2012	Bharat Ki Shaan: Singing Star (Season 2)	Host	DD National		
2012	Sur Sangram (Season 1 and 2)	Host			
2013	Welcome – Baazi Mehmaan Nawazi Ki	Contestant	Life OK	Along with Sanaya Irani, Andy Kumar	
2018	Nehle Pe Dehla	Host			
2026	Dhammal with Pati Patni Aur Panga – Jodiyon Ka Reality Check	Contestant	Colors TV	Season 2	

== See also ==
- Bharatiya Janata Party, Delhi
