= List of roles and awards of Arshad Warsi =

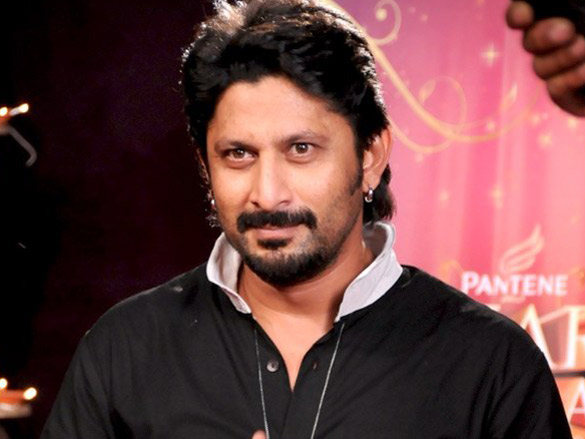
Warsi in 2010

Arshad Warsi started his career as an assistant director to Mahesh Bhatt in Kaash (1987). Warsi choreographed the title song of Roop Ki Rani Choron Ka Raja (1993), before making his acting debut in the Amitabh Bachchan-produced Tere Mere Sapne (1996). It was followed by Betaabi (1997), Hero Hindustani (1998), Hogi Pyaar Ki Jeet and Trishakti (both 1999), among others, but most of these films failed to do well at the box office. In 2003, he had his breakthrough by playing the comic sidekick Circuit in Rajkumar Hirani's comedy-drama Munna Bhai M.B.B.S. His performance garnered him the Zee Cine Award for Best Actor in a Comic Role and received nominations for the Filmfare, IIFA, Screen and Apsara Film Producers Guild Award for Best Supporting Actor. Warsi won the GIFA Best Comedian Award for his role in the comedy Hulchul (2004), and garnered critical acclaim for portraying a police officer in the crime drama Sehar (2005). He received his second Filmfare Award for Best Supporting Actor nomination for his role in the romantic comedy Salaam Namaste (2005).

In 2006, Warsi starred in the Rohit Shetty-directed comedy Golmaal: Fun Unlimited, and reprised his role of Circuit in the sequel Lage Raho Munna Bhai. His performance in the latter won him the Filmfare Award for Best Performance in a Comic Role, among other awards. That same year, he played lead roles in the mystery Anthony Kaun Hai? and the counter-terrorism drama Kabul Express. Warsi also hosted the first season of the reality television show Bigg Boss for which he earned the Indian Television Academy Award for Best Anchor – Game/Quiz Show. In 2007, he played a footballer in the sports film Dhan Dhana Dhan Goal. The following year, he reteamed with Shetty for Golmaal Returns (2008), and played an intermittent explosive disorder patient in the comedy Krazzy 4 (2008). He won the Screen Award for Best Supporting Actor and received several nominations for playing a con man in the black comedy Ishqiya (2010). Also in 2010, Warsi co-produced and starred in the supernatural comedy-drama Hum Tum Aur Ghost, which performed poorly at the box office. Golmaal 3, the year's second-highest grossing Hindi film also featured him in a primary role. His first negative role came in 2013 with the action thriller Zila Ghaziabad, a critical and commercial failure. Warsi's portrayal of a lawyer in the comedy-drama Jolly LLB (2013), directed by Subhash Kapoor, garnered him several awards, including the IIFA Award for Best Performance in a Comic Role. His portrayal of a thief in Dedh Ishqiya (2014) attracted critical praise.

== Films ==
Key
†	Denotes films / dramas that are not yet released

Year	Title	Role	Notes	Ref(s)
1993	Roop Ki Rani Choron Ka Raja	—	Choreographer for song "Roop Ki Rani Choron Ka Raja"	
1996	Tere Mere Sapne	Balu		
1997	Betaabi	Vicky/Chetan (Note: Warsi's character in the film had two names.)		
1998	Mere Do Anmol Ratan	Narinder (Naren)		
1998	Hero Hindustani	Romi	Credited as Arshad Warsi Khan	
1999	Hogi Pyaar Ki Jeet	Kishan		
1999	Trishakti	Sagar Malhotra		
2000	Ghaath	Diwakar		
2001	Mujhe Meri Biwi Se Bachaao	Rocky		
2002	Jaani Dushman: Ek Anokhi Kahani	Abdul		
2003	Waisa Bhi Hota Hai Part II	Puneet Syal		
2003	Munna Bhai M.B.B.S.	Circuit		
2004	Hulchul	Lucky		
2005	Kuchh Meetha Ho Jaye	Manager S.R. Khan		
2005	Maine Pyaar Kyun Kiya?	Vicky		
2005	Sehar	SSP Ajay Kumar		
2005	Salaam Namaste	Ranjan Mathur		
2005	Chocolate	Tubby		
2005	Vaah! Life Ho Toh Aisi!	Fakira B.P.C.M.		
2006	Golmaal: Fun Unlimited	Madhav Singh Ghai		
2006	Anthony Kaun Hai?	Champak 'Champ' Chaudhari		
2006	Lage Raho Munna Bhai	Circuit		
2006	Kabul Express	Jai		
2007	Dhamaal	Aditya 'Adi' Shrivastava		
2007	Dhan Dhana Dhan Goal	Shaan		
2008	Halla Bol	Himself	Cameo appearances	
2008	Sunday	Ballu		
2008	Krazzy 4	Raja		
2008	Mr. Black Mr. White	Kishen		
2008	Golmaal Returns	ACP Madhav		
2009	Kisse Pyaar Karoon	Siddharth		
2009	Ek Se Bure Do	Toti		
2009	Shortkut	Raju		
2010	Ishqiya	Razzak Hussain/Babban		
2010	Hum Tum Aur Ghost	Armaan Suri	Also screenwriter and producer	
2010	Golmaal 3	Madhav		
2011	F.A.L.T.U	Google		
2011	Double Dhamaal	Adi		
2011	Love Breakups Zindagi	—	Cameo appearances	
2012	Ajab Gazabb Love	Businessman	Cameo appearances	
2013	Zila Ghaziabad	Mahender Fauji Bainsla Gujjar		
2013	Jolly LLB	Advocate Jagdish "Jolly" Tyagi		
2013	Rabba Main Kya Karoon	Shravan		
2014	Mr Joe B. Carvalho	Joe B. Carvalho		
2014	Dedh Ishqiya	Babban		
2015	Welcome 2 Karachi	Shammi Thakur		
2015	Guddu Rangeela	Rangeela		
2016	The Legend of Michael Mishra	Michael Mishra		
2017	Irada	Arjun Mishra		
2017	Golmaal Again	Madhav		
2018	Bhaiaji Superhit	Goldie Kapoor		
2019	Fraud Saiyaan	Bhola Prasad Tripathi		
2019	Total Dhamaal	Adi		
2019	Pagalpanti	Junky		
2020	Durgamati	Ishwar Prasad		
2022	Bachchhan Paandey	Vishu Kant Mhatre		
2024	Bandaa Singh Chaudhary	Bandaa Singh Chaudhary		
2025	Jolly LLB 3	Advocate Jagdish "Jolly" Tyagi		
2025	Bhagwat: Chapter One – Raakshas	Vishwas Bhagwat		
2025	Mastiii 4	Kamraj		
2026	Welcome to the Jungle	Romeo		
2026	Dhamaal 4	Aditya "Adi" Srivastav		
2026	Jeevan Ya Bheema Con?	Jeevan & Bheema	Double role	
2026	Ghamasaan	Maharaj		
2026	King †	TBA		
2027	Golmaal 5 †	Madhav		

== Television ==
Year	Title	Role	Notes	Ref.
2001	Razzmatazz	Host		
2003	Karishma – The Miracles of Destiny	Pakiya		
2004	Sabse Favourite Kaun	Host		
2006	Bigg Boss Season 1	Host		
2010	Zara Nachke Dikha	Judge		
2010	Ishaan	Himself		
2015	Comedy Nights with Kapil	Host		
2020–2023	Asur	Dhananjay Rajpoot "DJ"		
2022	Modern Love: Mumbai	Daniel		
2023	Choona	Narrator		
2023–2024	Jhalak Dikhhla Jaa season 11	Judge		
2025	The Ba***ds of Bollywood	Gafoor Bhai	Cameo	
2026	Pritam and Pedro	Pedro Gonsalves		

== Awards and nominations ==
Award	Year	Nominated work	Result	Ref(s)
Zee Cine Award for Best Actor in a Comic Role	2004	Munna Bhai M.B.B.S.	Won	
Filmfare Award for Best Supporting Actor	2004	Munna Bhai M.B.B.S.	Nominated	
IIFA Award for Best Supporting Actor	2004	Munna Bhai M.B.B.S.	Nominated	
Screen Award for Best Supporting Actor	2004	Munna Bhai M.B.B.S.	Nominated	
Apsara Film Producers Guild Award for Best Actor in a Supporting Role	2004	Munna Bhai M.B.B.S.	Nominated	
GIFA Award for Best Comedian	2005	Hulchul	Won	
Filmfare Award for Best Performance in a Comic Role	2005	Hulchul	Nominated	
IIFA Award for Best Performance in a Comic Role	2005	Hulchul	Nominated	
Screen Award for Best Comedian	2005	Hulchul	Nominated	
Filmfare Award for Best Supporting Actor	2006	Salaam Namaste	Nominated	
GIFA Award for Best Supporting Actor	2006	Lage Raho Munna Bhai	Nominated	
Filmfare Award for Best Performance in a Comic Role	2007	Lage Raho Munna Bhai	Won	
IIFA Award for Best Supporting Actor	2007	Lage Raho Munna Bhai	Won	
Zee Cine Award for Best Actor in a Comic Role	2007	Lage Raho Munna Bhai	Won	
Screen Award for Best Supporting Actor	2007	Lage Raho Munna Bhai	Won	
Indian Television Academy Award for Best Anchor—Game/Quiz Show	2007	Bigg Boss	Won	
Screen Award for Best Supporting Actor	2011	Ishqiya	Won	
Filmfare Award for Best Supporting Actor	2011	Ishqiya	Nominated	
IIFA Award for Best Supporting Actor	2011	Ishqiya	Nominated	
Stardust Award for Best Actor in a Thriller or Action	2011	Ishqiya	Nominated	
BIG Star Entertainment Award for Most Entertaining Actor in a Social–Drama Film (Male)	2013	Jolly LLB	Nominated	
BIG Star Entertainment Award for Most Entertaining Actor in a Comedy Film (Male)	2013	Jolly LLB	Won	
IIFA Award for Best Performance in a Comic Role	2014	Jolly LLB	Won	
Apsara Film Producers Guild Award for Best Performance in a Comic Role	2014	Jolly LLB	Won	
BIG Star Entertainment Award for Most Entertaining Actor in a Thriller Film (Male)	2014	Dedh Ishqiya	Nominated	

== See also ==
- List of accolades received by Lage Raho Munna Bhai
