= Shwetha Menon =

Indian actress, model and television anchor

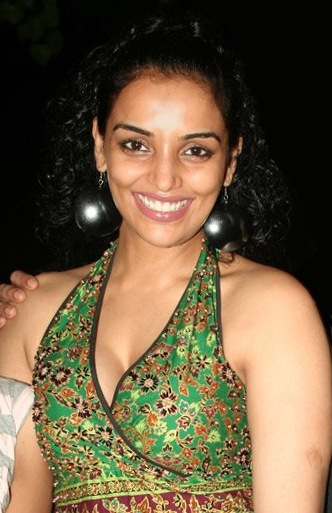
- Menon at an event
- Born: 23 April 1974 (age 52); Chandigarh, India
- Occupations: Actor; model; television anchor
- Years active: 1991–present
- Title: Femina Miss India Asia Pacific 1994; Femina Miss India 1994 (3rd Runner up)
- Spouses: Bobby Bhonsle (m. 2004; div. 2007); Sreevalsan Menon (m. 2011)
- Children: 1
- Relatives: Anoop Menon (cousin)
- Awards: Kerala State Film Awards
- Website: www.shwetha-menon.com

Shwetha Menon (born 23 April 1974), is an Indian actress, model, television anchor and beauty pageant titleholder. She has won Femina Miss India Asia Pacific 1994. She has predominantly acted in Malayalam, Tamil, Telugu and Hindi films. She has won two Kerala State Film Awards for Best Actress and two Filmfare Award South. She participated in Bigg Boss Malayalam Season 1.

Starting her career as an actress in Malayalam feature films in the early 1990s, she ventured into modeling and became noted, after participating in and winning several beauty pageants, which led to her debut in Hindi cinema. It was the film Ishq (1997) and also Bandhan (1998). Following appearances in over 30 Hindi films, in which she generally conveyed a glamorous image, her acting career took a turn by the mid-2000s, with her returning to Malayalam cinema and accepting substantial roles. She received critical praise and several accolades including the Kerala State Film Award for Best Actress for her performances in Paleri Manikyam: Oru Pathirakolapathakathinte Katha (2009) and Salt N' Pepper (2011). In 2018, she contestant in the Malayalam reality TV series Bigg Boss and was eliminated after 36 episodes aired on Asianet, hosted by the veteran actor Mohanlal. She simultaneously appeared in commercial films, television reality shows and parallel films.

Shwetha Menon was elected as president of Association of Malayalam Movie Artists (AMMA) in 2025 and becomes 1st woman president of AMMA. She along with 17 other executive committee members resigned on 21 June 2026 due to amid controversy and internal disputes in AMMA.

== Early life ==
Shwetha Menon was born on 23 April 1974 in Chandigarh to Malayali parents T. V. Naranankutty and Sarada Menon who hail from Valanchery in Malappuram district in Kerala. Her father served in the Indian Air Force while her mother remained a housewife. She studied in Kendriya Vidyalaya No. 1, East Hill, Kozhikode.

== Career ==
=== Films ===
She started her career as an actress in the Malayalam film Anaswaram (1991), directed by Jomon, playing the female lead opposite Mammootty, after which she focused on modeling. She competed in the Miss India contest in 1994 and finished third runner-up behind Sushmita Sen, Aishwarya Rai and Fransesca Hart. She became the first Gladrags female super model in 1994 (Kelly Dorjee was the male super model) and then, Miss Asia Pacific semi-finalist in 1994 in Manila Cebu Island, Philippines. She subsequently made her debut in Hindi cinema and appeared in over 30 films; some of her Bollywood films include Asoka (2001), Maqbool (2003) and Corporate (2006).

Menon returned to Malayalam in 2006 with Thantra and then went on to do famous Malayalam films such as Keerthi Chakra (2006) and the award-winning Paradesi. Her performance as Sarojini, a middle-class woman who fights against extreme odds, in Madhya Venal earned her a special mention by jury chairman Bahman Ghobadi, a famous Iranian director at the International Film Festival of Kerala. In 2010, she won the Kerala State Government's Best Actress for her portrayal of Cheeru, a village woman in the film Paleri Manikyam: Oru Pathirakolapathakathinte Katha directed by Ranjith. She won the Mathrubhumi-Amrita TV Special Jury Award and the Asianet Film Award for Best Supporting Actress for the same film. In 2011, Shweta Menon starred in the remake of Rathinirvedam an Erotic Movie, playing the titular character, originally played by Jayabharathi. In the same year, she got the Kerala State Award for Salt N' Pepper. For her next movie, Naval Enna Jewel, Shweta Menon has undergone a remarkable makeover as an elderly man.

In 2010, Menon approached a local court and the Women's Commission in Kerala after the distributor of her movie tied up with Musli Power, a sex stimulant drug, to jointly promote the movie. "Met with Women's Commission regarding the Kayam ad and they offered me full backing. Thank you all and I hope justice will be done," she tweeted.

=== Television ===
Besides working in films, she has anchored several TV, stage and film awards shows. Menon rose to popularity after presenting the musical programme, Star Wars on Kairali TV in 2008. She won the Asian Television Award for Best Anchor for the same program. In Hindi, she hosted the group band based show, Razzmatazz on Zee TV with actor Arshad Warsi. The next television show she did was Dancing Queen in 2008 on Colors. In 2010, she anchored the Malayalam reality show, Honeymoon Travels on Surya TV. The show became an instant hit for Shwetha's accented Malayalam and her attempts to read from the original script without a formal learning in the language. Recently, she appeared as a contestant with her father in the game show, Deal or No Deal on Surya TV. She was the anchor of the family-based reality show Veruthe Alla Bharya on Mazhavil Manorama. She has participated in the popular game show Ningalkkum Aakaam Kodeeshwaran on Asianet. She was running popular comedy reality show Minto Goal Comedy Stars on Asianet in 2015. She has acted in many advertisements. She was a contestant in the season 1 of the reality TV show Bigg Boss aired on Asianet, from which she was eliminated after 36 episodes. In 2019 she made her TV comeback as the host for a family talent hunt show on Mazhavil Manorama titled Kusurthi Kudumbam.

== Personal life ==
Shwetha was married to Bollywood model, Bobby Bhonsle, but it ended up in divorce. On 18 June 2011, she married Sreevalsan Menon, a native of Thrissur. The ceremony took place at the Neythalappurath Sastha Ayappa temple, Valanchery, Kerala. She has a daughter, whose delivery was recorded on camera as part of the film Kalimannu.

== Controversies ==
Shwetha Menon was charged with insulting the Indian flag at a fashion show on 5 January 2004. The show was organized by NIFD at a resort, where Menon walked the ramp allegedly with the tricolour wrapped around her body.

In 2011, she filed a case against Kunnath Pharmaceuticals' managing director K. C. Abraham for misusing stills from her film Kayam (2011) for promoting their Ayurvedic aphrodisiac Musli Power Extra. The Ernakulam Central Police arrested Abraham.

Shwetha allowed her delivery to be recorded for Blessy's film Kalimannu (2013). The act was condemned for commercializing the most private affair of a woman by the Kerala Film Exhibitors.

On 4 November 2013, she filed a case against N. Peethambara Kurup of the Indian National Congress in a groping incident. Shweta later dropped her complaint against Kurup, saying the 71-year-old leader tendered a "personal apology" to her hours after she lodged the FIR against him.

== Awards ==
Kerala State Film Awards

- 2009 – Best Actress – Paleri Manikyam: Oru Pathirakolapathakathinte Katha
- 2011 – Best Actress – Salt N' Pepper

Filmfare Awards South

- 2009 – Best Actress – Malayalam – Paleri Manikyam: Oru Pathirakolapathakathinte Katha

South Indian International Movie Awards

- 2012 – SIIMA Award for Actress – Special Appreciation – Rathinirvedam
- 2013 – SIIMA Award for Best Supporting Actress – Ozhimuri

Other Awards

- 2009 – Asian Television Award for Best TV Anchor
- 2009 – Special Mention at International Film Festival of Kerala by Jury Chairman, Bahman Ghobadi about performance in Madhyavenal
- 2010 – Amrita TV – Mathrubhumi Special Jury Award – Paleri Manikyam: Oru Pathirakolapathakathinte Katha
- 2010 – Asianet Film Award for Best Supporting Actress – Paleri Manikyam: Oru Pathirakolapathakathinte Katha
- 2013 – Asianet Film Awards for Best Character Actress – Ozhimuri
- 2013 – Asiavision Awards – Outstanding Performance – Kalimannu
- 2018 : Milan Film Festival 2018 – Best Supporting Actress -Naval Enna Jewel

== Filmography ==
=== Films ===
Key
†	Denotes films that have not yet been released

List of Shwetha Menon film credits
Year	Title	Role	Language	Notes
1991	Anaswaram	Catherine	Malayalam	
1992	Welcome to Kodaikanal	Kavitha	Malayalam	
1992	Nakshthrakoodaram	Nirmala S. Menon	Malayalam	
1993	Koushalam	Sashikala	Malayalam	
1995	Desa Drohulu	Anu	Telugu	
1997	Prithvi	Lucky	Hindi	
1997	Ishq	Dancer	Hindi	Special appearance
1998	Bandhan	Vaishali	Hindi	
2000	Shikari	Tania Jacobs	Hindi	
2000	Snegithiye	Police Inspector, Jayashree	Tamil	
2000	Sandhitha Velai	Dancer	Tamil	Special appearance
2001	Asoka	Nandaneshwari	Hindi	
2001	Anandam	Dancer in song	Telugu	Special appearance
2001	Khatron Ke Khiladi	Dancer	Hindi	
2001	Kakkakuyil	Dancer	Malayalam	Special appearance
2001	Dubai	Dancer	Malayalam	Item Dance
2002	Kaaboo	Dancer/Singer	Hindi	Special appearance
2002	Haan Maine Bhi Pyaar Kiya		Hindi	
2002	Vadh		Hindi	Cameo
2002	Annarth	Khatun	Hindi	Cameo
2002	Ab Ke Baras	Chembakam	Hindi	
2002	Anokha Bandhan		Hindi	
2003	Koi Hai...	Liza	Hindi	
2003	Tu Bal Bramhachari Main Hoon Kanya Kunwari	Rani	Hindi	
2003	Dhund: The Fog	Tanya Khurana	Hindi	
2003	Pran Jaye Par Shaan Na Jaye	Sheela	Hindi	
2003	88 Antop Hill	Teesta	Hindi	
2003	Kahan Ho Tum	Santhali	Hindi	
2003	Maqbool	Mohini	Hindi	
2003	Gokarna	item dancer	Kannada	
2003	Market	Isha	Hindi	
2003	Mission Mumbai		Hindi	
2003	Juniors		Telugu	Cameo
2003	Hungama		Hindi	
2004	The Killer – Ek Qatil		Hindi	
2004	Omkara		Kannada	Cameo
2004	Run	Ganpat's wife	Hindi	
2004	30 Days	Paro/Shalu	Hindi	
2004	Bazaar: Market of Love, Lust and Desire		Hindi	
2004	Shikaar	Rama Sahay	Hindi	
2005	Mera Yudh		Hindi	
2005	Bad Friend		Hindi	
2005	Vardi		Hindi	
2005	Topless		Hindi	
2005	Fresh Lime		Hindi	
2005	Dhamkee	Chandni	Hindi	
2006	Corporate	Archana	Hindi	
2006	Sandwich	Maggie	Hindi	
2006	Keerthi Chakra	Aathira	Malayalam	
2006	Pakal	Latha Mohankumar	Malayalam	
2006	Thanthra	Swethamukhi	Malayalam	
2007	Raakilipattu	Jayasree	Malayalam	
2007	Nehlle Pe Dehlla	dancer/singer	Hindi	Cameo
2007	Aur Phir Ek Din		Hindi	
2007	Paradesi	Aamina	Malayalam	
2007	Rock n' Roll	Meenakshi	Malayalam	
2007	Abraham & Lincoln	Lulu	Malayalam	
2008	Summer 2007	D.S.P Keerti	Hindi	Special appearance
2008	Laptop	Mother	Malayalam	
2008	Aakasha Gopuram	Alice	Malayalam	
2008	Samayam	Manikyam	Malayalam	
2009	Kisse Pyaar Karoon	Chameli / Julie	Hindi	
2009	Naan Avanillai 2	Nisha	Tamil	
2009	Madhya Venal	Sarojini	Malayalam	
2009	Paleri Manikyam: Oru Pathirakolapathakathinte Katha	Cheeru	Malayalam	Kerala State Film Award for Best Actress; Filmfare Award for Best Actress – Malayalam
2009	Kerala Cafe	Devi	Malayalam	segment "Aviraamam"
2010	Chase	Kareena Chopra	Hindi	Cameo
2010	Pokkiri Raja	Dancer	Malayalam	Special appearance
2010	Penpattanam	Suhara	Malayalam	
2010	Sadgamaya	Jyothi	Malayalam	
2010	T. D. Dasan Std. VI B	Chandrika	Malayalam	
2010	Valiyangadi	Lakshmi	Malayalam	
2010	Kadaksham	Revathy	Malayalam	
2011	Kayam	Thamara	Malayalam	
2011	August 15	Dr. Farida	Malayalam	
2011	City of God	Liji Punnose	Malayalam	
2011	Rathinirvedam	Rathi	Malayalam	
2011	Salt N' Pepper	Maya Krishnan	Malayalam	Kerala State Film Award for Best Actress; Nominated – Filmfare Award for Best Actress – Malayalam
2011	Rajanna	Dorasanni	Telugu	
2012	Unnam	Sereena	Malayalam	
2012	Aravaan	Rajaambaal	Tamil	Special appearance
2012	Thalsamayam Oru Penkutty	Sareena	Malayalam	
2012	No. 66 Madhura Bus	Rita Mammen	Malayalam	
2012	Ivan Megharoopan	Maya Maheswari	Malayalam	
2012	Ithra Mathram	Sumithra	Malayalam	
2012	Ozhimuri	Kaliamma	Malayalam	
2012	Parudeesa	Thresia	Malayalam	
2012	Aakasmikam	Anitha	Malayalam	
2013	Mumbai Police	Dr. Tanuja Nair	Malayalam	
2013	Kalimannu	Meera	Malayalam	
2013	Careebeyans	Catherine	Malayalam	
2014	100 Degree Celsius	Nila	Malayalam	Also playback singer
2015	Thunai Mudhalvar	Thangamani	Tamil	
2015	Appavum Veenjum	Dr.Nayana	Malayalam	
2015	Rudrasimhasanam	Umayamma	Malayalam	
2015	Akeldamayile Pennu	Agnes	Malayalam	
2015	Maayamalika	Manikyam	Malayalam	
2015	Haram	Herself	Malayalam	
2016	Dhanayathra	Vijila	Malayalam	
2017	Inayathalam	Helen	Tamil	
2017	Naval Enna Jewel	Chachu	Malayalam	
2018	Kammara Sambhavam	Malayil Maheshwari	Malayalam	
2018	Premanjali	Subhadra	Malayalam	
2018	Oru Kuprasidha Payyan	Dr. Renuka Subramanian	Malayalam	
2019	Fancy Dress	Priya	Malayalam	
2021	Black Coffee	Maya Krishnan	Malayalam	
2023	Pallimani	Lillykutty	Malayalam	
2023	Queen Elizabeth	Dr. Shanti Krishna	Malayalam	
2024	Badal	Naxalite Reena	Malayalam	
2025	Jangar	Malli	Malayalam	
2025	Karam	Dr. Nandita Bose	Malayalam	

=== Web series ===
List of Shwetha Menon web series credits
Year	Title	Role	Language	Notes
2024	Nagendran's Honeymoons	Laila Sulthana	Malayalam	Disney+ Hotstar

=== Television ===
List of television credits
Year	Show	Role	Channel	Language	Notes
90's	Manasi	Actress		Malayalam	TV series
90's	Ladies Hostel	Actress		Malayalam	TV series
2001	Razzmatazz	Co-host	Zee TV	Hindi	with Arshad Warsi
2007	Star Wars	Host		Malayalam	Won, Asian Television Award for Best Anchor
2008–2009	Dancing Queen	Contestant	Colors TV	Hindi	
2009	Honeymoon Travels	Host		Malayalam	Replacing Lalu Alex
2010	Deal or No Deal	Participant	Surya TV	Malayalam	
2010	Idea Star Singer	Celebrity Judge	Asianet	Malayalam	
2010	Super Jodi	Judge		Malayalam	
2011–2012	Veruthe Alla Bharya	Host	Mazhavil Manorama	Malayalam	
2012	Veruthe Alla Bharya Season 2	Host	Mazhavil Manorama	Malayalam	Replaced by Rimi Tomy
2013	Ningalkkum Aakaam Kodeeshwaran	Participant	Asianet	Malayalam	
2015	Veruthe Alla Bharya Season 3	Host	Mazhavil Manorama	Malayalam	
2015–2016	Comedy Stars Season 2	Judge	Asianet	Malayalam	
2015	Star Challenge	Participant		Malayalam	
2015	Page 3	Model		Malayalam	
2016–2017	Katturumbu	Judge	Flowers TV	Malayalam	
2016	Aluvayum Mathikariyum	Herself	Asianet Plus	Malayalam	Cameo in promo
2016	Onachithrangal	Special host		Malayalam	
2017	Manasaveera	Promo anchor	Asianet Plus	Malayalam	Promotion of the show
2017	Comedy Circus	Judge	Mazhavil Manorama	Malayalam	
2017	Tharodayam new face hunt	Judge		Malayalam	
2017	Laughing Villa Season 2	Judge		Malayalam	
2017	Asianet Comedy Awards	Promo anchor	Asianet	Malayalam	
2018	Super Jodi	Judge		Malayalam	Replaced by Annie
2018	Bigg Boss (Malayalam season 1)	Contestant	Asianet	Malayalam	Evicted on day 35
2019	Kusruthi Kudumbam	Host		Malayalam	
2020	Suryajodi No.1	Judge	Surya TV	Malayalam	Replacing Ineya
2020–2021	Comedy Stars Season 2	Judge	Asianet	Malayalam	
2020–2021	Funny Nights	Judge/Host	Zee Keralam	Malayalam	
2020	Red Carpet	Mentor	Amrita TV	Malayalam	
2021	Udan Panam	Contestant	Mazhavil Manorama	Malayalam	
2021–2022, 2024	Star Magic	Mentor	Flowers TV	Malayalam	
2021	Super Power	Mentor		Malayalam	
2021	Aram + Aram = Kinnaram	Host	Surya TV	Malayalam	
2021	Manjil Virinja Poovu	Actress Shweta (Guest Role)	Mazhavil Manorama	Malayalam	TV Serial
2021–2022	Comedy Stars Season 3	Judge	Asianet	Malayalam	
2021	Oru Chiri Iru Chiri Bumper Chiri	Judge	Mazhavil Manorama	Malayalam	
2021	Asianet Big B Dhamaka	Contestant	Asianet	Malayalam	
2022	Mounaragam	Actress Shweta (Guest Role)	Asianet	Malayalam	TV Serial
2022–present	Comedy Masters	Judge	Amrita TV	Malayalam	
2022	Oru Kodi	Contestant	Flowers TV	Malayalam	
2023	Dancing Stars	Judge	Asianet	Malayalam	replacing Durga Krishna
2023–2024	Ammayum Makalum	Judge	Amrita TV	Malayalam	
2023–2024	Kidilam	Judge	Mazhavil Manorama	Malayalam	
2024	Bigg Boss (Malayalam season 6)	Guest	Asianet	Malayalam	Day 59–61 as Challenger
2024-2025	Enkile Ennodu Para	Host	Asianet	Malayalam	

=== Dubbing artist ===
In 2017, she lent her voice for the role of a police officer played by Raashii Khanna in Malayalam film Villain.
