= Astana Siraj-Ul-Aashqeen =

Sufi shrine in Lahore, Pakistan

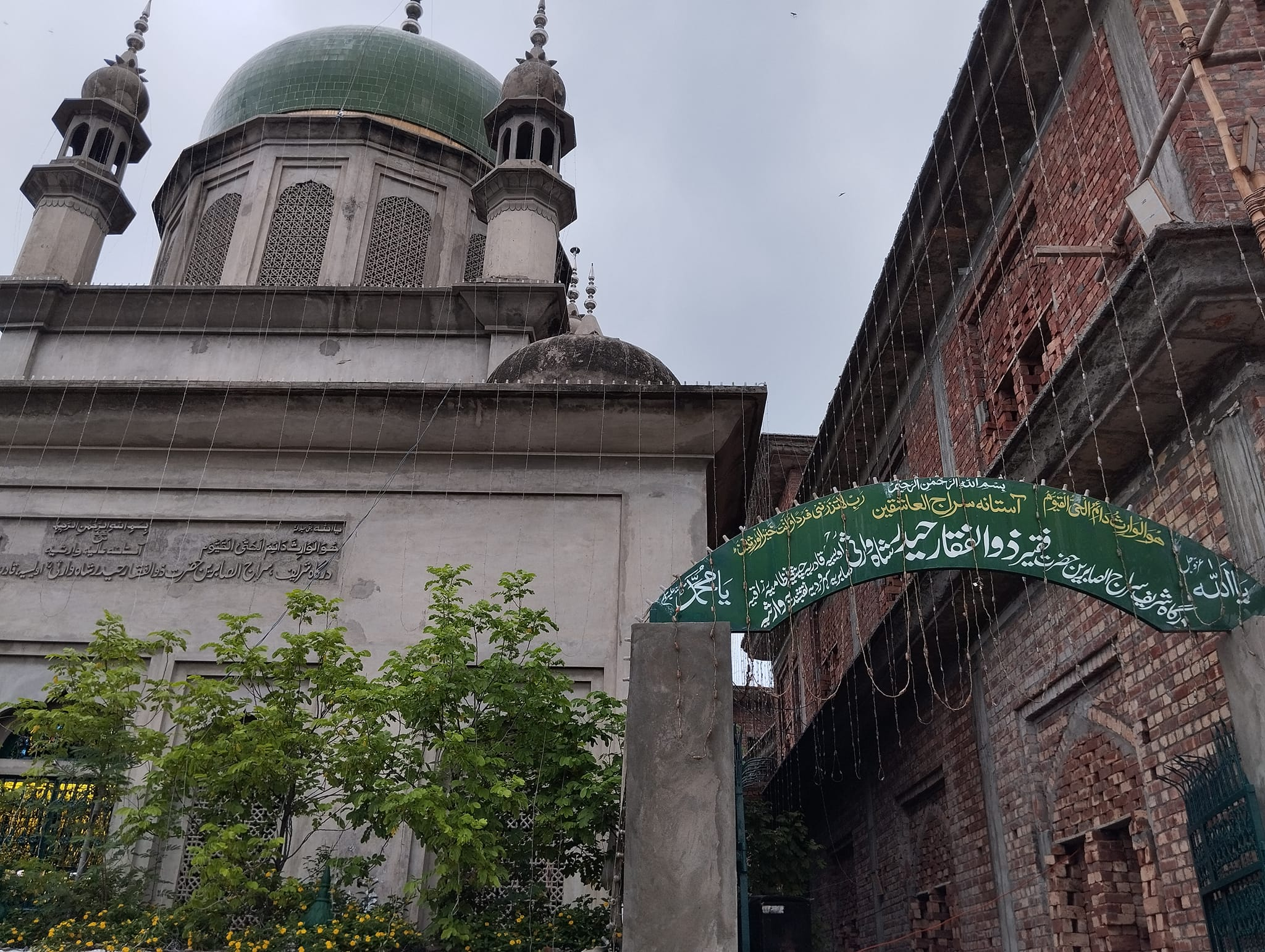

Religion
- Affiliation: Islam

Astana Siraj-Ul-Aashqeen is a Sufi shrine to Hazrat Zulfiqar Haider Shah Warsi in Lahore, Pakistan, associated with the Silsila-e-Warsi and Sayed Waris Ali Shah from Dewa Shareef, India. Astana Siraj-Ul-Aashqeen is located in Lahore (Punjab, Pakistan), and is the Sufi shrine belonging to Hazrat Zulfiqar Haider Ali Shah Warsi. Astana Siraj-Ul-Aashqeen is a mystic body of religious and Sufi practices the remains of Sayed Waris Ali Shah, a Sufi saint from India. The Warsi spiritual genealogy is the practitioner of Islamic spirituality, asceticism, esotericism, and Sufism for all humankind. It has defined the mystical Islamic expression to manifest the dimension of Islamic practices. The Warsi spirituality and congregation as a Sufiism center was formed by Faqeer Zulfiqar Ali Shah Warsi who is the administrator of the Astana Siraj-Ul-Aashqeen.

== Waris Ali Shah ==
Sayed Waris Ali Shah (1817–1905) was a 26th generation descendant of Husayn ibn Ali, the grandson of Muhammad. He was a follower of the Qadriyyah Order. He was orphaned at a young age and attached himself to Hazrat Khadim Ali Shah, a dervish from Lucknow, Uttar Pradesh, India.

=== History ===
The Sufi shrine of Hazrat Faqeer Zulfiqar Haider Shah Warsi was established as a grave next to the mosque in 2010.
