= Raghu Romeo =

- Movie poster
- Directed by: Rajat Kapoor
- Written by: Rajat Kapoor; Saurabh Shukla
- Produced by: Naseeruddin Shah; Narayan Hosmane
- Starring: Vijay Raaz; Nishikant Dixit; Sadiya Siddiqui; Maria Goretti; Saurabh Shukla
- Cinematography: Rafey Mehmood
- Edited by: Suresh Pai
- Music by: Pritam
- Release dates: 15 August 2003 (Locarno Film Festival); 18 June 2004 (India)
- Running time: 100 minutes
- Country: India
- Language: Hindi

Raghu Romeo is a 2003 Indian Hindi-language comedy drama film directed by Rajat Kapoor, starring Vijay Raaz, Sadiya Siddiqui, Maria Goretti, Manu Rishi and Saurabh Shukla. The film was released on 15 August 2003 to critical acclaim and success at the box office. Set in modern-day Mumbai, the film focuses on the life of a waiter working in a dance bar. The film won the National Film Award for Best Feature Film in Hindi.

== Plot ==
Raghu Romeo (Vijay Raaz) is a guileless man from a lower-middle-class family. He is a 30-year-old waiter henpecked by his mother and by the boss who seldom pays him. In his naivete, Raghu thinks he must protect the virtue of the bar's female staff from clients, especially Sweety (Sadiya Siddiqui), who is a hitman's girl whose cynical surface masks a soft spot for the clueless hero. But Raghu only has eyes for Neeta, a quintessential TV-soap suffering-heroine character played by (Maria Goretti). Unable to distinguish between fantasy and real life, Raghu kidnaps the terrified actress and takes her to the countryside house of Sweety. It turns out she is on the hit-list for failing to pay off the entertainment industry's mob "protectors".

== Cast ==
- Vijay Raaz as Raghu
- Sadiya Siddiqui as Sweety
- Saurabh Shukla as Mario
- Maria Goretti as Reshma / Neetaji
- Manu Rishi as Zahid
- Veerendra Saxena as Yadav
- Vijay Patkar as Hari
- Surekha Sikri as Mother
- Ikhlaq Khan as Vermaji
- Anjali Nadig as Mother in law
- Neha Sharma as Sister in law
- Dhruv Singh as Brother in law
- Ayesha Raza as News reader

== Music ==
Raghu Romeo

Soundtrack album by Pritam
- Released: 18 June 2004
- Recorded: Mumbai
- Studios: Trinity; Spectral Harmony; Junk and Genius; Joshua
- Genre: Filmi
- Length: 40:32
- Label: Crescendo

Pritam chronology
Agnipankh (2004)	Raghu Romeo (2004)	Dhoom (2004)

All tracks are written by Pritam.

No.	Title	Length
1.	"Main Hero Raghu Romeo" (Performed by Kunal Ganjawala, Lyrics by Sanjeev Sharma)	4:23
2.	"Strawberry Hoon Main" (Part 1) Performed by Sunidhi Chauhan, Lyrics by Sanjeev Sharma)	3:44
3.	"Sweety Ke Koftey"	3:07
4.	"Jaake Khuda Ke Ghar Pe" (Qawwali) Performed by Kunal Ganjawala & Gayatri Iyer, Lyrics by Sanjeev Sharma)	2:58
5.	"Raghus Theme - The Party"	4:22
6.	"Murder Attempt"	1:00
7.	"Rain"	0:54
8.	"Raghu In The City"	1:12
9.	"Main Mamooli Admi" (Performed by Kunal Ganjawala & Kavita Krishnamurthy, Lyrics by Sanjeev Sharma)	5:25
10.	"Raghu In The Studio"	0:55
11.	"Sweetys Theme"	0:56
12.	"Purab-Paschim"	1:09
13.	"Strawberry Hoon Main" (Part 2) Performed by Sunidhi Chauhan, Lyrics by Sanjeev Sharma)	2:38
14.	"Mario Comes In"	0:23
15.	"Happy New Year"	2:43
16.	"Main Kaise Samjhaoon" (Performed by Kunal Ganjawala & Gayatri Iyer, Lyrics by Sanjeev Sharma)	1:43
Total length:		40:32

== Awards ==
- 2004 National Film Award for Best Feature Film in Hindi (Silver Lotus Award)
- 2003 Best feature film - MAMI International film festival
