= Hum Tum Aur Ghost =

2010 film by Kabeer Kaushik

Hum Tum aur Ghost
- Theatrical release poster
- Directed by: Kabeer Kaushik
- Screenplay by: Arshad Warsi
- Story by: Arshad Warsi; Anand Kumar
- Produced by: Arshad Warsi; Maria Goretti
- Starring: Arshad Warsi; Dia Mirza; Boman Irani; Sandhya Mridul
- Cinematography: Ashok Mehta
- Edited by: Steven H. Bernard
- Music by: Songs: Shankar–Ehsaan–Loy; Background Score: Julius Packiam
- Production company: Shooting Star Films
- Distributed by: Indian Films; Studio 18
- Release date: 26 March 2010
- Running time: 135 minutes
- Country: India
- Language: Hindi
- Budget: ₹21 crore
- Box office: ₹8.01 crore

Hum Tum Aur Ghost (transl. You, Me and the Ghost; earlier titled as Kaun Bola?! ) is a 2010 Indian Hindi supernatural comedy-drama film directed by Kabeer Kaushik and produced by Arshad Warsi, starring Arshad Warsi and Dia Mirza in the lead roles. This unofficial remake of Ghost Town was filmed in Newcastle upon Tyne, England. The film was released on 26 March 2010.

== Plot ==
In the world of Armaan (Arshad Warsi) and his girlfriend Gehna (Dia Mirza), life is truly beautiful, yet it's like walking on a tightrope. For Armaan, a debonair fashion photographer who is a charmer to the core and loved by all around him, life only gets better when he dates Gehna, a high-profile fashion magazine editor. Life is picture perfect and mash; a doting girlfriend and a job where his expertise makes him the most-wanted photographer in the London fashion world! Armaan has learnt that his chronic insomnia is, however, not a function of any sleeping disorder. The truth is that he hears voices; voices that torture him; voices that are disturbing him. More importantly, voices that nobody else can hear! Life is less than picture perfect now!

While his friends sympathize with his problems, his girlfriend Gehna is irritated with his weird behavior. Add to that her father Sinha (Javed Sheikh) constantly berates him for his fondness for the bottle. No one seems to understand his predicament. What puzzles them is that he talks to himself-or, rather, he talks to people who no one can see simply because they don't live. Soon, Armaan becomes aware of his special ability to connect with the souls that haven't crossed over. Equipped with a will to fulfill the wishes of these spirits who hound him, Armaan sets out on a mission to help out two souls: an old man, Mr. Virender Kapoor (Boman Irani), and a young woman, Carol (Zehra Naqvi). In this ensuing journey, Armaan discovers the lives of his two special companions and ends up frustrating Gehna. Yet, Armaan is on a journey where he discovers a lot about himself and his own life.

After he fulfils Kapoor's wish, he goes to find Carol's son Danny. He realizes that he is Danny but, when he tries to explain this to Gehna, she gets fed up and leaves him. She is then involved in a car crash and almost dies and becomes a ghost. Carol urges Gehna to help Armaan/Danny, and she comes back. After eight months, they get married, and Armaan stops seeing ghosts.

== Cast ==
- Arshad Warsi as Armaan Suri / Daniel "Danny" Fernandes
- Dia Mirza as Gehna Sinha
- Sandhya Mridul as Mini
- Boman Irani as Virendra Kapoor
- Zehra Naqvi as Carol Fernandes, Arman's mother
- Shernaz Patel as Doctor Taniyah
- Ashwin Mushran as Aditya "Adi" Kapoor, Virendra's son
- Asawari Joshi as Pooja Kapoor, Virendra's wife
- Javed Sheikh as Mr. Vikas Sinha, Gehna's father
- Tinnu Anand as Banker

== Reception ==
=== Critical response ===
Mayank Shekhar of the Hindustan Times rated the film 1.5 out of 5, writing, "Playing a girl-magnet, designer-wear, slick hair NRI hero in an artificial, romantic setup, just pales his coolness no end. But then again, ambition is such a b****." Taran Adarsh of the Bollywood Hungama website, who rated it 2.5/5, wrote that "Hum Tum Aur Ghost is a terrible waste of a terrific idea. Disappointing!"

=== Box office ===
Hum Tum Aur Ghost had a below average opening and collected only Rs. 4.90 crore during its theatrical run. Eventually, it was elevated to disaster status by Box Office India.

== Soundtrack ==
Hum Tum Aur Ghost

Soundtrack album by Shankar–Ehsaan–Loy
- Released: 10 March 2010
- Genre: Film soundtrack
- Label: T-Series
- Producer: Shankar–Ehsaan–Loy

Shankar–Ehsaan–Loy chronology
Karthik Calling Karthik (2009)	Hum Tum Aur Ghost (2010)	Housefull (2010)

The music was composed by Shankar–Ehsaan–Loy and Julius Packiam, with the former composing the songs and the latter composing the film score. The lyrics for the songs were written by Javed Akhtar.

Song	Singer(s)	Duration
"Dekho Raste Mein"	KK & Shreya Ghoshal	5:09
"Kal Tum The Yahan"	Caralisa Monteiro, Shankar Mahadevan, Dominique Cerejo, Clinton Cerejo	4:44
"Hum Tum Aur Ghost"	Vishal Dadlani & Arun Ingle	4:09
"Banware Se Pooche Banwariya"	Shaan, Sunidhi Chauhan, Maria Goretti, Loy Mendonsa, Raman Mahadevan, Anusha Mani & Rahul Saxena	4:38
"Dekho Raste Mein (Remix)"	KK & Shreya Ghoshal	4:46
"Hum Tum Aur Ghost (Remix)"	Shankar Mahadevan, Vishal Dadlani & Arun Ingle	2:52
"Kal Tum The Yahan (Remix)"	Caralisa Monteiro & Shankar Mahadevan	4:43
