= Tahira Kochhar =

Indian actress and former model (born 1990)

Tahira Kochhar (born Tahira Kochar, 31 January 1990) is an Indian actress and former model. She made her Bollywood Debut in the film Rabba Main Kya Karoon.

== Early life ==
Tahira Kochhar was born on 31 January 1990 in New Delhi to Komal Kochhar who was a teacher for 18 years and Gopal Kochhar who owns an advertising, marketing, and real estate agency. Her parents originate from Delhi. Tahira was brought up in Delhi attending Vasant Valley School and graduated from The British School with an I.B. diploma.

== Career ==
Modelling : Tahira started her career as a model during her college days. She started off with many editorial, ad film and magazine product shoots in Delhi. She is also been the face of J.J. Vallaya's Grand Finale Poster and Press Ads and walked the ramp for the same at WIFW. She made her mark as a Delhi Ramp Model and was soon after chosen as one of the finalist for Femina Miss India, 2010.

== Debut in Bollywood ==
Tahira always wanted to be an actor since her childhood. However, during her later school days she felt that being a Delhi girl and looking at all the talent the industry possessed, she felt her dream was a bit far-fetched. However, in September 2011, her films Director Amrit Sagar Chopra asked her to audition for her role in Rabba Main Kya Karoon female lead. Amrit Sagar Chopra came across Tahira's photographs after he was fed up auditioning almost up to 400 girls for the part in the movie. Tahira auditioned for the same in Delhi.Sure enough, she won the role as a leading heroine in Rabba Main Kya Karoon starring Arshad Warsi and introducing Akash Chopra along with Paresh Rawal, Raj Babbar.
