= Salaam Namaste =

- Movie poster
- Directed by: Siddharth Anand
- Written by: Siddharth Anand
- Dialogues by: Abbas Tyrewala
- Produced by: Aditya Chopra
- Starring: Saif Ali Khan; Preity Zinta
- Narrated by: Abhishek Bachchan
- Cinematography: Sunil Patel
- Edited by: Ritesh Soni
- Music by: Songs: Vishal–Shekhar; Background Score: Salim–Sulaiman
- Production company: Yash Raj Films
- Distributed by: Yash Raj Films
- Release date: 9 September 2005
- Running time: 159 minutes
- Country: India
- Language: Hindi
- Budget: ₹11 crore (US$1.1 million)
- Box office: ₹57.23 crore (equivalent to ₹212 crore or US$22 million in 2026)

Salaam Namaste (transl. Hello Greetings) is a 2005 Indian Hindi-language romantic comedy film written and directed by Siddharth Anand in his directorial debut, and produced by Aditya Chopra under the Yash Raj Films banner. Set in Melbourne, Australia, the film stars Saif Ali Khan and Preity Zinta as Nick and Ambar, two young Indian expatriates who navigate the challenges of cohabitation, career, and unexpected parenthood after choosing to live together without marriage. Arshad Warsi, Tania Zaetta, Jaaved Jaaferi, and Jugal Hansraj appear in supporting roles. The film was the first Indian film to be shot entirely in Australia. Principal photography took place across various locations in and around Melbourne. The music was composed by Vishal–Shekhar, with lyrics by Jaideep Sahni.

Released theatrically on 9 September 2005, Salaam Namaste received mostly positive reviews from critics. The performances, direction, and contemporary treatment of relationships were praised, though some criticism was directed at its narrative length. The film became the third highest-grossing Indian film of the year and the top overseas performer for an Indian release in 2005, with notable success in markets such as Australia, the United Kingdom, and North America.

On 24 September 2005, the screenplay was invited to the permanent script collection of the Margaret Herrick Library, maintained by the Academy of Motion Picture Arts and Sciences. Zinta's performance received acclaim, earning her nominations for Best Actress at the Filmfare Awards, IIFA Awards, Star Screen Awards, and Zee Cine Awards.

== Plot ==
Nikhil "Nick" Arora, an Indian architect-turned-chef, and Ambar "Amby" Malhotra, a medical student and radio jockey, are two independent, modern Indians living in Melbourne, Australia. Nick was sent abroad to study architecture but pursues his passion for cooking, eventually becoming head chef of his own restaurant. Ambar, having declined several arranged marriage proposals in India, chooses to remain in Australia after a student exchange program and is financially supporting herself by working at the local radio station Salaam Namaste, after being disowned by her parents.

Nick is scheduled for an interview on Ambar's radio show but misses it twice, prompting Ambar to insult him on-air. The two meet at a wedding, unaware of each other's identities, and begin to connect. Nick's friend Ron falls for Ambar's friend Cathy, and the two couples grow closer. Nick eventually appears on the radio show and publicly confesses his feelings for Ambar. The two fall in love and decide to move in together without getting married.

Although they initially try to maintain personal boundaries, their relationship becomes physical. When Ambar discovers she is pregnant, the couple initially plan to terminate the pregnancy, but she changes her mind. This decision leads to conflict and ultimately a breakup. Over the next several months, the pair continue to clash while cohabiting, leading to several comedic situations. During one argument, Ambar feels the baby kick, prompting Nick to realise he still loves her.

Ambar later asks Nick to undergo a thalassemia test, due to her being a carrier. At the clinic, he learns she is expecting twins. On his way home, he reflects on his absence during her pregnancy and resolves to take responsibility. He goes to buy an engagement ring but sees Ambar trying on rings with a friend, Jignesh, and mistakenly assumes she is getting engaged to him.

Distraught, Nick drinks heavily and brings home a woman named Stella. The next morning, Stella reveals that Nick spent the night crying over Ambar. Meanwhile, Ambar sees Stella leaving and misinterprets the situation. Nick later learns that Ambar was helping Jignesh shop for his girlfriend's engagement ring. With help from the radio station's listeners, Nick finds Ambar and apologises, but her water breaks and they rush to the hospital.

At the hospital, Ron and Cathy are also expecting a child, and Stella reappears as a nurse. She assures Ambar of Nick's fidelity. The couple is assisted by a humorous obstetrician, Dr. Vijay, who manages the delivery despite his eccentricity. Before the birth, Nick proposes, and Ambar accepts. The film concludes with the couple welcoming twin children.

== Cast ==
- Saif Ali Khan as Nikhil "Nick" Arora
- Preity Zinta as Ambar "Amby" Malhotra
- Arshad Warsi as Ranjan "Ron" Mathur
- Jaaved Jaaferi as Jaggu Yadav aka Crocodile Dundee
- Jugal Hansraj as Jignesh “Jerry” Pandya
- Tania Zaetta as Cathy R. Mathur
- Kunal Vijaykar as Deepan Nair / Debonair
- Kavita Kapoor as Dr. Reema Desai
- Ravi Khote as Aslam Dheka (Nick of Time Restaurant owner)
- Siddharth Anand as the taxi driver (cameo appearance)
- Ness Wadia as the man reading the newspaper on the bus (cameo appearance)
- Maria Goretti as the lady at the bookstore (cameo appearance)
- Abhishek Bachchan as Dr. Vijay Kumar MDGGO (cameo appearance)

== Production ==
=== Development ===
Salaam Namaste marked the directorial debut of Siddharth Anand. In addition to directing, Anand made a cameo appearance in the film as a taxi driver in the climax.

=== Casting ===
The film featured several cameo appearances. Abhishek Bachchan served as the narrator and appeared in the final act as Dr. Vijay Kumar, an eccentric obstetrician. Arshad Warsi's wife, Maria Goretti, and their son, Zeke, appeared in a bookstore scene alongside Saif Ali Khan's character. Preity Zinta’s then-partner, Ness Wadia, made a brief appearance as a man reading a newspaper on a bus.

=== Filming ===
Salaam Namaste was the first Indian film to be shot entirely in Australia, primarily in and around Melbourne and regional Victoria. The production used several locations, including the Great Ocean Road and Rye Beach on the Mornington Peninsula. Tourism Australia reported a significant rise in Indian tourism, attributed in part to the film’s popularity.

== Themes ==
Salaam Namaste explores a number of contemporary themes such as cohabitation, premarital sex, and unplanned pregnancy, situating them within the context of modern Indian identity and diaspora life. The film addresses the tension between domesticity and individual freedom, particularly among young urban professionals navigating life outside traditional Indian social frameworks.

In their academic study, Snachari De and Amit Sarwal noted that the film presents the "Australian Dream" as an alternative to the traditionally valorised "American Dream" in diaspora narratives. They further observed that premarital pregnancy, while potentially taboo in Indian society, is normalised within the film’s narrative, reflecting shifting attitudes among globalised Indian youth.

Film critic Subhash K. Jha commented on the film’s portrayal of commitment-phobia, particularly among career-driven men, writing that “beneath the vibrant veneer, the film makes a very telling and serious comment on commitment-phobia, especially among the ambitious urban males who would rather have their cake and sleep with it too.”

== Soundtrack ==
Salaam Namaste

Soundtrack album by Vishal–Shekhar
- Released: 3 August 2005 (India)
- Genre: Feature film soundtrack
- Label: Yash Raj Music
- Producer: Vishal–Shekhar

Vishal–Shekhar chronology
Dus (2005)	Salaam Namaste (2005)	Ek Ajnabee (2005)

The soundtrack of Salaam Namaste features seven tracks, including four original songs and two remixes, composed by the duo Vishal–Shekhar, with lyrics by Jaideep Sahni. The album was released on 3 August 2005 by YRF Music.

The music was commercially successful. According to Box Office India, the album sold approximately 1.4 million units, making it the thirteenth highest-selling Bollywood soundtrack of the year.

Track list
No.	Title	Singer(s)	Length
1.	"Salaam Namaste (Title Track)"	Kunal Ganjawala, Vasundhara Das	04.37
2.	"Tu Jahan"	Sonu Nigam, Mahalakshmi Iyer	05.15
3.	"My Dil Goes Mmmm"	Shaan, Gayatri Iyer	07.34
4.	"What's Going On?"	Kunal Ganjawala, Sunidhi Chauhan	04.41
5.	"My Dil Goes Mmmm (English Club Mix)"	Shaan, Caralisa Monteiro (mix by DJ Aqeel Ali)	04.08
6.	"Salaam Namaste (Title Track - Dhol Mix)"	Kunal Ganjawala, Vasundhara Das, DJ Nikhil Chinapa, DJ Naved Khan	03.54
7.	"My Dil Goes Mmmm (English Club Mix - Instrumental)"	Instrumental (mix by DJ Aqeel Ali)	04.08

== Release ==
Salaam Namaste had a notable cultural impact in Australia, where it was entirely shot. Fran Bailey, then Australia's Minister for Small Business and Tourism, credited the film with contributing to a 21% rise in Indian tourism to Australia. She stated, "Australia is receiving enormous exposure through Salaam Namaste, the latest Bollywood hit filmed entirely on location in Victoria."

== Reception ==
=== Box office ===
Salaam Namaste emerged as a commercial success, becoming the third highest-grossing Indian film of the year and the highest-grossing Indian film in the overseas market that year. The film grossed approximately ₹572 million (US$6.8 million) worldwide.

=== Critical reception ===
Salaam Namaste received generally positive reviews from critics, with praise directed at its contemporary themes, performances, and fresh approach to urban relationships. Particular acclaim was given to Preity Zinta's portrayal of Ambar, which was considered among her finest performances. Taran Adarsh of Bollywood Hungama rated the film 4 out of 5 stars, calling it "an immensely likeable film that should appeal to all ages, mainly its target audience—the youth." He praised Saif Ali Khan's "spirited performance" and described Zinta's work as "her most accomplished performance to date." The Hindu highlighted the film's emotional relatability, especially in the second half, noting Zinta's "good job with the hysterics." Dominic Ferrao of Filmfare wrote that both leads "come off with flying colors," and called the film an example of how "Indian cinema is evolving." Pratim D. Gupta of The Telegraph called it "the film of the year," citing Khan's comic timing and Zinta's screen presence as key strengths.

Several critics emphasized the film's nuanced take on adult relationships. Devyani Srivastava of Mid-Day wrote that the film's "substance lies in the pensive questions it poses," and described Zinta's character Ambar as "a rare Bollywood heroine" for her independence and assertiveness. Subhash K. Jha argued that the performances compensated for what he considered a "mediocre story," while Screen praised the visual appeal and the "confident debut" of director Siddharth Anand. Sarita Tanwar of Mid-Day called the subject "bold, refreshing, and unique" but felt the screenplay required "fine-tuning." Lindsay Perreira of Rediff.com appreciated the humor and the chemistry between the leads, noting that it offered "an afternoon of laughs" and a "well-shot tour of Melbourne." Rama Sharma of The Tribune described the film as worth watching despite what she felt was an "inadequate" ending.

Some critics were more reserved. Namrata Joshi of Outlook praised the film's progressive portrayal of its characters but found the treatment of the pregnancy subplot unconvincing. Khalid Mohamed of DNA India noted the film was "polarized between the terrific and the tedious," though he acknowledged the strength of the lead performances. Anubha Sawhney pointed out similarities to the 1995 Hollywood film Nine Months, suggesting that certain scenes were directly inspired by it.

Internationally, Salaam Namaste also received attention. Derek Elley of Variety described it as "a bonny 2.5 hours of dialogue-driven entertainment," commending the leads for their ability to move between comedy and drama without sentimentality. Ethan Alter of Film Journal International remarked that the Melbourne setting and performances were standouts in an otherwise conventional Bollywood film. Manish Gajjar of the BBC praised the film as "a great entertainer," citing the "perfect" comic timing of Khan and Zinta. Anita Gates of The New York Times gave the film a mixed review, calling Zinta "cheerleader-homecoming queen-fraternity sweetheart pretty," but critiquing the overall narrative structure.

== Accolades ==
Award	Date of the ceremony	Category	Recipients	Result	Ref.
Screen Awards	11 January 2006	Best Actress	Preity Zinta	Nominated	
Stardust Awards	15 February 2006	Actor of the Year – Female	Preity Zinta	Nominated	
Filmfare Awards	25 February 2006	Best Actress	Preity Zinta	Nominated	
Filmfare Awards	25 February 2006	Best Supporting Actor	Arshad Warsi	Nominated	
Filmfare Awards	25 February 2006	Best Performance in a Comic Role	Jaaved Jaaferi	Nominated	
Zee Cine Awards	4 March 2006	Best Actor – Male	Saif Ali Khan	Nominated	
Zee Cine Awards	4 March 2006	Best Actor – Female	Preity Zinta	Nominated	
Zee Cine Awards	4 March 2006	Best Debut Director	Siddharth Anand	Won	
Bollywood Movie Awards	10 June 2006	Best Actress	Preity Zinta	Nominated	
IIFA Awards	15–17 June 2006	Best Actor	Saif Ali Khan	Nominated	
IIFA Awards	15–17 June 2006	Best Actress	Preity Zinta	Nominated	
IIFA Awards	15–17 June 2006	Best Performance in a Comic Role	Jaaved Jaaferi	Won	

== See also ==
- List of movies set in Australia
