= Gayatri Iyer =

Indian playback singer

- Also known as: Gayatri Ganjawala
- Born: Lucknow, Uttar Pradesh, India
- Genres: playback singing
- Occupation: Singer
- Years active: 1995–present

Gayatri Ganjawala (née Iyer) is an Indian playback singer, primarily in Bollywood. She landed up with the part of Princess Anjuli in the West End of London musical production of M. M. Kaye's The Far Pavilions, which opened in the summer of 2007.

Iyer is married to Kunal Ganjawala.. She graduated from the Indian Institute of Management Lucknow (IIML) in 2001.

== Discography ==
- Gulabi (May 1995)
- Loafer (9 June 1996)
- Muqaddar (12 July 1996)
- Daanveer (20 September 1996)
- Insaaf (30 May 1997)
- Mohabbat Kar Le (4 December 1997)
- Tanha Dil (29 January 2000)
- Yeh Kya Ho Raha Hai? (11 October 2002)
- Chura Liyaa Hai Tumne (21 March 2003)
- Ek Aur Ek Gyarah (28 March 2003)
- Bhoot (30 May 2003)
- Chupke Se (12 September 2003)
- Raghu Romeo (2004)
- Rudraksh (13 February 2004)
- Kismat (20 February 2004)
- Silence Please – The Dressing Room (9 April 2004)
- Masti (9 April 2004)
- Dhoom (27 August 2004)
- Dil Ne Jise Apna Kahaa (10 September 2004)
- Bride and Prejudice (8 October 2004)
- Naach (12 November 2004)
- Hulchul (26 November 2004)
- Elaan (14 January 2005)
- Jurm (18 February 2005)
- Kyaa Kool Hai Hum (6 May 2005)
- Black (2005)
- Salaam Namaste (9 September 2005)
- Dil Jo Bhi Kahey... (23 September 2005)
- Kasak (30 September 2005)
- Tumar Moromere (11 April 2006)
- Ladies Tailor (7 July 2006)
- Alag (16 June 2006)
- Anthony Kaun Hai? (4 August 2006)
- Meri Awaz Ko Mil Gayi Roshni (TV Serial {Same Name} Title Track 2007)
- Honeymoon Travels Pvt. Ltd. (23 February 2007)
- Aadavari Matalaku Arthale Verule (2007)
- Raqeeb (2007)
- Fear (2007)
- Roadside Romeo (2008)
- Tum Hi To Ho (2011)
- Ammaa Ki Boli (2012)
- Gandhi the Hero (2016)
- Nach Baliye Title Song
- India Calling Title Song
- Jodi Kamaal Ki Title song
