= Arshad Warsi =

Indian actor (born 1968)

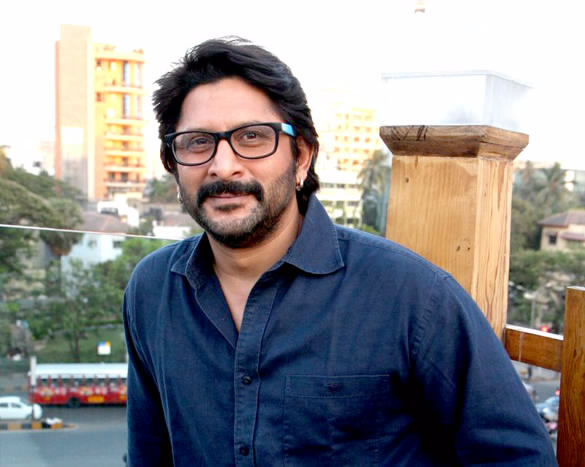
- Warsi in 2013
- Born: Arshad Hussain; 19 April 1968 (age 58); Bombay (now Mumbai), Maharashtra, India
- Occupation: Actor
- Years active: 1993–present
- Works: Full list
- Spouse: Maria Goretti (m. 1996)
- Children: 2
- Relatives: Anwar (half-brother); Asha Sachdev (half-sister)

Arshad Warsi (born 19 April 1968) is an Indian actor who appears in Hindi films. He is the recipient of several awards including a Filmfare Award from five nominations and is noted for acting in varied film genres.

Before making his acting debut, Warsi served as an assistant director to Mahesh Bhatt in Kaash (1987) and also choreographed a song in Roop Ki Rani Choron Ka Raja (1993). Warsi made his acting debut in 1996 with Tere Mere Sapne, which was a box office success. His portrayal of Circuit in the comedy film Munna Bhai M.B.B.S. (2003), and its sequel Lage Raho Munna Bhai (2006) for which he won the Filmfare Award for Best Performance in a Comic Role marked a turning point in his career. He featured in several commercially successful comedy films, including Hogi Pyaar Ki Jeet (1999), Hulchul (2004), Maine Pyaar Kyun Kiya? (2005), Salaam Namaste (2005), Golmaal: Fun Unlimited (2006), Dhamaal (2007), Krazzy 4 (2008), Golmaal Returns (2008), Ishqiya (2010), Golmaal 3 (2010), F.A.L.T.U (2011), Double Dhamaal (2011), Jolly LLB (2013), Golmaal Again (2017) and Total Dhamaal (2019), and received critical recognition for his work in films including Sehar (2005), Kabul Express (2006), Dedh Ishqiya (2014) and Guddu Rangeela (2015). He is widely regarded by many as one of the most underrated actors in the Hindi film industry.

In addition to acting in films, Warsi has hosted the dance show Razzmatazz in 2001, Sabse Favourite Kaun in 2004 and the first season of the reality television show Bigg Boss for which he was awarded the Indian Television Academy Award for Best Anchor – Game/Quiz Show. He starred opposite Karisma Kapoor in the TV serial Karishma – The Miracles of Destiny (2003) and featured as a judge for Zara Nachke Dikha in 2010. Warsi is married to Maria Goretti since 1999 with whom he has two children.

== Early life and education ==
Warsi was born in Mumbai. His father, Ahmed Ali Khan (Ashiq Hussain), was an Urdu poet who had also worked as a musician in Hindi films and adopted the name Warsi after he became a follower of the Sufi saint Waris Ali Shah. Arshad is the half-brother of singer Anwar Hussain and actress Asha Sachdev from his father's first marriage to actress Ranjana Sachdev.

His father being a Punjabi from Lahore, Warsi used to speak both Punjabi and Urdu while growing up. He did his schooling at a boarding school, Barnes School, in Deolali, Nashik district, Maharashtra. He was orphaned at the age of 14 and struggled for a living in Bombay during his early days. He left school after 10th standard.

Financial circumstances forced Warsi to start work as a door-to-door cosmetics salesman at age 17. Later he worked in a photo-lab. Meanwhile, he developed a keen interest in dancing and received an offer to join Akbar Sami's Dance group in Mumbai, which started his dancing and choreographing in Thikana (1987) and Kaash (1987).

Then in 1991, he won the Indian dance competition, followed by the fourth prize in the Modern Jazz category in the 1992 World Dance championship, London, at the age of 21. Soon, he started his own dance studio, "Awesome" with that money and also formed a dance troupe. It was here that his future wife, Maria Goretti, a St. Andrew's College student, joined him before she became a VJ. He was also associated with English theatre group in Mumbai, choreographing shows for Bharat Dabholkar and got an opportunity to choreograph the title track for the film Roop Ki Rani Choron Ka Raja (1993). During this time he was offered a role by Jaya Bachchan for Tere Mere Sapne.

== Film career ==
He got his first offer to act in Amitabh Bachchan's production company, Amitabh Bachchan Corporation's first production Tere Mere Sapne in 1996. Before that he had made a small appearance as a dancer in a song in Aag Se Khelenge. He followed this by roles in films such as Betaabi (1997), Mere Do Anmol Ratan and Hero Hindustani (both 1998). His performance in P Vasu's Hogi Pyaar Ki Jeet (1999) was praised by Rediff.com's Suparn Verma. Warsi's next release was Madhur Bhandarkar's directorial debut Trishakti (1999). Completed in 3 years, the film performed poorly at the box office. His only film appearances of 2001 were in Ghaath, followed by Mujhe Meri Biwi Se Bachaao (2001) and Jaani Dushman: Ek Anokhi Kahani (2002). Most of these failed to do well at the box office. In Shashanka Ghosh's Waisa Bhi Hota Hai Part II, he played a common man who saves the life of a goon who is fatally shot. Ronjita Kulkarni wrote that he gave a "winning performance".

In 2003, he rose to fame when he starred as Circuit to Munna Bhai (Sanjay Dutt) in Rajkumar Hirani's comedy Munna Bhai M.B.B.S. which turned out to be a huge box office success and gained him much critical acclaim and a nomination at the Filmfare Award for Best Supporting Actor. He won the Zee Cine Award for Best Actor in a Comic Role for the same. Warsi said in an interview that had the film not worked, his career would have finished. His only release in 2004 was the comedy Hulchul which earned him the GIFA Best Comedian Award and nominations for the Screen Award for Best Actor, Filmfare Award for Best Performance in a Comic Role and IIFA Award for Best Performance in a Comic Role. Warsi played an airport manager opposite Mahima Chaudhry in Samar Khan's Kuchh Meetha Ho Jaye (2005). His performance in Sehar was positively received by critics and Sanhita Paradkar of Rediff.com wrote that: "finally [he is] in a much-deserved lead role". In the same year he appeared as a supporting actor in the romantic comedies Maine Pyaar Kyun Kiya? and Salaam Namaste. For the latter, he was nominated for the Filmfare Award for Best Supporting Actor. He played a computer hacker in the Vivek Agnihotri-directed suspense thriller film Chocolate. Indrani Roy Mitra of Rediff.com said that Warsi gave a "commendable [performance]" in Vaah! Life Ho Toh Aisi! (2005).

Warsi collaborated with Rohit Shetty forGolmaal: Fun Unlimited (2006), which was the first installment of the Golmaal series. His next release was the comic thriller Anthony Kaun Hai?, directed by Raj Kaushal. The film drew from many Hollywood and Bollywood films and Warsi won praise from critics for his role of a conman. Raj Lalwani opined that the film "belongs to [him]" and that he was "one of the most underrated actors around". He once again teamed up with Rajkumar Hirani and Sanjay Dutt for Lage Raho Munna Bhai (2006), which won him his first Filmfare Award for Best Performance in a Comic Role, IIFA Award for Best Supporting Actor, Zee Cine Award for Best Actor in a Comic Role and Screen Award for Best Supporting Actor. His portrayal of a cameraman kidnapped by the Taliban in the counter-terrorism drama Kabul Express (2006), from Kabir Khan, won appreciation. H S Bunty wrote that Warsi "steals the show". Warsi appeared in the box office success comedy Dhamaal (2007). He played the role of a Pakistani footballer living in London in the sports drama Dhan Dhana Dhan Goal (2007). In director Jaideep Sen's comedy Krazzy 4, Warsi a person suffering from intermittent explosive disorder. The film failed to generate favourable reviews. Ameeta Gupta praised Warsi's performance in Deepak Shivdasani's comedy Mr. Black Mr. White (2008). He reteamed with Rohit Shetty for the comedy Golmaal Returns (2008). His first release of 2009 was Kisse Pyaar Karoon, followed by Ek Se Bure Do. He played lead role in Neeraj Vora-directed comedy Shortkut, a remake of the Malayalam film Udayananu Tharam (2005).

In 2010, Warsi won the Screen Award for Best Supporting Actor and was nominated for the Filmfare Award for Best Supporting Actor and the IIFA Award for Best Supporting Actor for the black-comedy Ishqiya. He appeared alongside Naseeruddin Shah and Vidya Balan. He produced and acted in Hum Tum Aur Ghost. The film received negative reviews and performed poorly financially. He once again collaborated with Rohit Shetty for the comedy Golmaal 3. It was a commercial success. Raja Sen opined that "Warsi [was] killing all the streetside-cred he's built up with bhai-sidekick roles by overdoing it." His 2011 releases include the comedies F.A.L.T.U and Double Dhamaal, which were both above-average grossers. The former was directed by Remo D'Souza and was inspired by the 2006 American comedy film Accepted, directed by Steve Pink. Preeti Arora called the latter a "huge disappointment".

His only film role in 2012 was in a guest appearance in Ajab Gazabb Love. CNN-IBN wrote that Warsi was "good and effective". His first release of 2013 was the action-thriller Zila Ghaziabad in which he played the role of a gangster. Charu Thakur criticised the film but praised Warsi's performance. He played a lawyer in the Subhash Kapoor-directed Jolly LLB, his first solo hit. Raja Sen wrote that he was "earnest to a fault". He was awarded the BIG Star Entertainment Award for Most Entertaining Actor in a Comedy Film (Male) and the IIFA Award for Best Performance in a Comic Role and Apsara Film Producers Guild Award for Best Performance in a Comic Role for his performance in the comedy drama. The film won the National Film Award for Best Feature Film in Hindi. Warsi played an important role in the Amrit Sagar Chopra-directed sex comedy Rabba Main Kya Karoon (2013). He starred as the titular detective in Samir Tewari's comedy Mr Joe B. Carvalho opposite Soha Ali Khan. Panned by critics, the film failed to perform well at the box office. He starred in Abhishek Chaubey's Dedh Ishqiya (2014). He suffered a head injury while shooting an action scene for Manish Jha's comedy film The Legend of Michael Mishra. Ashish R Mohan's comedy Welcome to Karachi (2015) featured Warsi alongside Jackky Bhagnani and Lauren Gottlieb. Rohit Vats and Shubha Shetty-Saha lauded Warsi's acting and comic timing. Warsi's next superhit was Golmaal Again in 2017, in which he reprised the role of Madhav from previous Golmaal films, starring alongside Ajay Devgn, Tabu, Parineeti Chopra, Shreyas Talpade, Kunal Khemu and Tusshar Kapoor. It went on to become one of the year's highest grossers and was a blockbuster at the box office. After Golmaal Again, he went on to star in Bhaiyyaji Superhitt, Fraud Saiyaan, Total Dhamaal, Pagalpanti while film Zamaanat, a courtroom drama directed by S Ramanathan, is still unreleased. Arshad Warsi's last release was in March 2022, the Akshay Kumar and Kriti Sanon starrer 'Bachchan Pandey'. He was seen in Jolly LLB 3 with Akshay Kumar, released on 19th September, 2025.

== Television career ==
Warsi was the co-host of the dance show Razzmatazz (2001) on Zee TV. He starred opposite Karisma Kapoor in the TV serial Karishma – The Miracles of Destiny from 2003 to 2004. It aired on Sahara One. He hosted a popular award show Sabse Favourite Kaun (2004) for STAR Gold. He was the host of Bigg Boss 1 (2006), the Indian version of the reality television series Big Brother which was aired on Sony Entertainment. Warsi won the Indian Television Academy Award for Best Anchor—Game/Quiz Show for this. He has also done a small cameo on Disney Channel's television show Ishaan: Sapno Ko Awaaz De (2010).

== Stock market ==
In March 2023, Arshad Warsi was accused by India's securities regulator SEBI to have engaged in stock market manipulation.

In May 2025, he was banned by SEBI from participating in Indian stock market for 5 years.

== Personal life ==
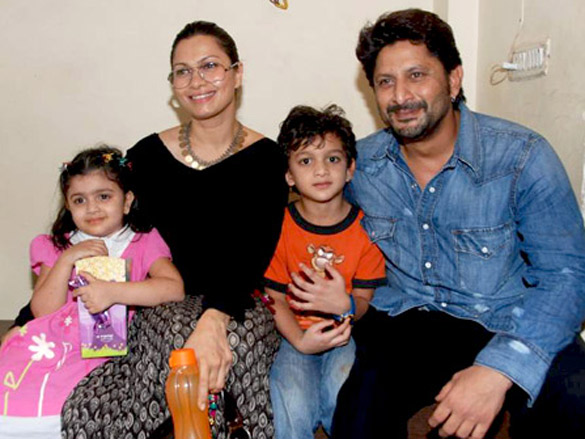
Warsi with wife Maria Goretti and children in 2010

Arshad Warsi married Maria Goretti on 15 February 1996. They have two kids, son named Zeke Warsi, born in 2005 and daughter Zene Zoe Warsi, born in 2007. Zeke also, made a special appearance in Salaam Namaste. During his school days, Warsi was a national level gymnast.

== Reception and artistry ==
Warsi considers himself a better serious actor than a comic one. He's also an avid biker and was part of a bikers' gang in school. Actor Naseeruddin Shah said that: "He is easily the best all-round actor in this generation", while Vidya Balan said of Warsi: "He reminds me of the great European actors who can fit into any role. But he is completely under-utilised". In his book Hero Vol.2, Ashok Raj has called him "one of the most talented actors among today's breed". A well known actor, Warsi does not prefer giving auditions. Bhawana Somaaya has called him "one of the best three dancers of the Hindi film industry". Director Samir Tewari called him "the most underrated and un-utilised actor." Boman Irani also feels the same and called him a "natural and unique performer".

== Work and accolades ==
Warsi won the Filmfare Award for Best Performance in a Comic Role in 2007. He has been awarded the Zee Cine Award for Best Actor in a Comic Role twice (in 2004 and 2007).
