= Khuda Bakhsh Sheikh =

Khuda Bakhsh (or Bux) Sheikh (Urdu: خُدا بخش شیخ, Hindi: ख़ुदा बख़्श शेख़) was an Urdu writer and poet from the Barabanki district of Uttar Pradesh, India. He published poetry in Arabic, Urdu and Persian.

He followed a Sufi master, Waris Ali Shah, and wrote a book Tohmat-ul-Asfiya about him. In 1877 he published Shah's sayings as a book entitled Malfuzat-i-Haji Waris 'Ali Shah.

== See also ==
- Waris Ali Shah
- Bedam Shah Warsi
