= Waisa Bhi Hota Hai Part II =

- Theatrical release poster
- Directed by: Shashanka Ghosh
- Written by: Shashanka Ghosh; Javed Ahmed; Junaid Memon
- Produced by: Rahul Misra; Samir Gupta
- Starring: Arshad Warsi; Prashant Narayanan; Sandhya Mridul; Anant Jog
- Cinematography: Andre Menezes
- Edited by: Neerav Ghosh
- Music by: Vishal–Shekhar; Shibani Kashyap; Saibal Basu; Abhinav Dhar
- Release date: 14 November 2003
- Running time: 138 minutes
- Country: India
- Language: Hindi

Waisa Bhi Hota Hai Part II (transl. It Happens That Way Too, Part II ; stylized as : ~~aisa~~ waisa bhi hota hai part II) is a 2003 Indian Hindi-language black comedy crime film starring Arshad Warsi. The film is Shashanka Ghosh in his directorial debut.

== Plot ==
Puneet Sayal is a copywriter who dreams of earning enough money to leave his job and settle in Nainital. Until then, he lives in Bombay with his girlfriend, Agni.

His life begins to unravel when he learns that his estranged brother has been shot dead. After Agni discovers the news, an argument between them leads her to throw him out of the house. Distraught, Puneet goes on a drinking binge and eventually passes out on a park bench, where he witnesses a man being shot. Unaware of it at the time, the incident marks a turning point in his life.

Puneet rescues the injured man, a gangster named Vishnu, and in doing so becomes entangled in Bombay's notorious gang wars.

Running parallel to Puneet's story is the power struggle between rival ganglords Ganpat and Gangu. Ganpat is the city’s dominant kingpin, while Gangu remains perpetually second in command, determined to overthrow him and become the top don.

== Cast ==
- Arshad Warsi as Puneet Sayal
- Prashant Narayanan as Vishnu
- Sandhya Mridul as ACP Agni Sinha
- Anant Jog as Ganpat
- Pratima Kazmi as Gangu Tai
- Suchitra Pillai as Shalu
- Manini De as Sumi
- Skand Mishra as Chandu
- Kurush Deboo as Cyrus

Singers Kailash Kher, Shibani Kashyap and Rabbi Shergill make a cameo in the film and sing their songs on-screen. Mahima Chaudhry and Maria Goretti also make special appearances. The barista trio in the film comprises Channel V VJs Ranvir Shorey and Shruti Seth, and John Owen.

== Reception ==
Ronjita Kulkarni of Rediff.com wrote, "Debutant director Shashanka Ghosh deserves a lot of the credit. Besides great dialogues and subtle comedy (a rarity these days), Ghosh has made the story believable. It's not the regular gangster flick. Nor is it another Satya." Anupama Chopra of India Today praised the performances and music but criticised the tone of the film.

Taran Adarsh of IndiaFM gave the film 2 out of 5, writing, "On the whole, WAISA BHI HOTA HAI: PART II is a good attempt from a first-timer, but the treatment of the film is such, it caters to a niche audience i.e the multiplex-going cinegoers."

== Awards ==
Kailash Kher won the Best Male Playback Singer award at the 2004 Star Screen Awards. The film was nominated for Best Performance in a Negative Role (Pratima Kazmi), Best Dialogues, Best Editing, Best Lyrics and Best Screenplay at the Star Screen Awards but failed to win any.

== Soundtrack ==
Waisa Bhi Hota Hai Part II

Soundtrack album by Vishal–Shekhar, Shibani Kashyap, Saibal Basu, Abhinav Dhar
- Released: October 2003
- Recorded: Unknown
- Genre: Film soundtrack
- Label: Zee Music Company / Zee Records

The soundtrack features seven songs by composers including Vishal–Shekhar, Shibani Kashyap, Saibal Basu and Abhinav Dhar and written by Sadaquat Hussain, Vishal Dadlani, Abhinav Dhar and Virag.

No.	Title	Lyrics	Music	Singer(s)	Length
1.	"Sajna"	Sadaquat Hussain	Shibani Kashyap	Shibani Kashyap	4:26
2.	"Allah Ke Bande"	Vishal Dadlani	Vishal–Shekhar	Kailash Kher	4:06
3.	"Laundiya"	Abhinav Dhar	Abhinav Dhar, Saibal Basu	Rabbi Shergill	4:51
4.	"Prem Dunk"	Virag	Abhinav Dhar, Saibal Basu	Shibani Kashyap	3:40
5.	"Tum Bas Tum"	Virag, Abhinav Dhar	Abhinav Dhar, Saibal Basu	Shibani Kashyap	3:57
6.	"My Name Is Gurdeepa"	Abhinav Dhar	Abhinav Dhar, Saibal Basu	Bali Brahmabhatt	3:53
7.	"Jism"	Vishal Dadlani	Vishal–Shekhar	Sunidhi Chauhan	4:48
