= Kayam (2011 film) =

- Directed by: Anil K. Nair
- Written by: Viju Ramachandran
- Starring: Bala; Manoj K. Jayan; Shweta Menon
- Cinematography: Sadath
- Edited by: P C Mohanan
- Music by: Mohan Sithara
- Release date: 7 January 2011
- Country: India
- Language: Malayalam

Kayam is a 2011 Malayalam-language film directed by Anil K. Nair starring Bala, Manoj K. Jayan and Shwetha Menon in the lead roles.

== Plot ==
The fisherman Choonda is the leader of the Kabaddi Team of the village. Thamara is a native of the neighboring village. She saw her mother's brutal rape and murder. Tired of the men in her village vying for her body, she flees with Choonda to his village.

Sasikuttan, the leader of another Kabaddi team, vies with Choonda and both realize they are long lost-brothers. Sasikuttan stays in the village. He has also fallen in love with a local girl, Muthu.

== Cast ==
- Bala as Sasikuttan
- Manoj.K.Jayan as Choonda/Divakaran
- Shwetha Menon as Thamara
- Aparna Nair as Muthu
- Seema G. Nair as Chinnammu
- Anil Murali
- EA Rajendran
- Chembil Ashokan

== Controversy ==
Shwetha Menon, who played the lead role in the film has filed a complaint to take legal action against the producer for using the stills from the film for an ad of a sexual steroid pill. Swetha alleges that the scenes shot for the movie has been used to market the product without her knowledge and consent. Shwetha has also filed a complaint to the Vanitha Commission.
