= Abhi To Main Jawan Hoon =

- Directed by: Amjad Khan
- Starring: Sachin; Shehzad Khan; Bharat Bhushan
- Release date: 1989
- Country: India
- Language: Hindi

Abhi To Main Jawan Hoon (Devnagari: अभी ताे मैॱ जवान हॅू) is a Hindi comedy film directed by Amjad Khan released in 1989. Sachin, Anjan Srivastav and Bharat Bhushan played the pivotal roles in the film.

== Plot ==
Amar (Sachin) falls in love with a man hater Geeta (Sohani), who lives with her retired Major uncle (Anjan Srivastav) and is also fed up with her bad cousin (Shehzad Khan). In order to win Geeta's heart, her uncle and Amar make a plan. Geeta needs some money to get rid of her cousin. Amar disguises himself as a dying sixty-year-old man Dilfekh, who has enough money. At first Geeta doesn't want to marry him but her teacher explains that the marriage will be a short one because Dilfekh will not live long. Geeta marries him and then finds out the truth.

== Cast ==
- Sachin as Amar
- Anjan Srivastav
- Shehzad Khan
- Bharat Bhushan
- Viju Khote
- Kalpana Iyer

== Music ==
1. "Eena Meena Deeka" - Kumar Sanu
2. "Jane Kaha Kab De Jaye Dhokha" - Anuradha Paudwal, Mohammed Aziz
3. "Jawani Me Budhapa Hai" - Amit Kumar
4. "Mai To Aarti Utaru Re Maharani Geeta Ki" - Hariharan
