= Mujhe Meri Biwi Se Bachaao =

2001 film by Harry Baweja

- Directed by: Harry Baweja
- Written by: Harry Baweja; Anees Bazmee
- Screenplay by: Anees Bazmee
- Story by: Harry Baweja
- Produced by: Prakash Mehra
- Starring: Rekha; Naseeruddin Shah; Arshad Warsi
- Cinematography: Damodar Naidu
- Edited by: Kuldeep Mehan
- Music by: Rajesh Roshan
- Release date: 29 June 2001
- Running time: 120 minutes
- Country: India
- Language: Hindi

Mujhe Meri Biwi Se Bachaao (translation:Save me from my wife) is a 2001 Indian film directed by Harry Baweja. It stars Rekha and Naseeruddin Shah.

== Plot ==
Anand, a middle-class sybarite marries an obese middle-aged Kamini Mathur, the sole daughter of a rich father. When her father dies, she gets all his property shocking Anand. Then he start his affair with Anuradha, another sybarite, whom he tries to please with gifts which he manages to get by various tricks.

== Cast ==
- Rekha as Kamini Mathur
- Naseeruddin Shah as Anand Mathur
- Arshad Warsi as Rocky
- Suman Ranganathan as Anuradha
- Suresh Chatwal as Vakharia
- Mukul Dev as Monty
- Mushtaq Khan as Natwarlal
- Tiku Talsania as Malkani
- Priyanka Trivedi as Sonia Malkani
- Dinesh Hingoo as Mr. Ghotala
- Shakti Kapoor as cameo appearance

== Production ==
Rekha was to portray an obese woman and used padding for her role. Some of her scenes had Reshma Pathan as her body double. It also marked the first time in twenty years that Rekha was doing a comedy film. She had previously done one in Khubsoorat (1980). Producer Mehra commented that she had done a "wonderful job of losing and gaining weight".

This film is a remake of the 1986 American comedy Ruthless People starring Danny DeVito and Bette Midler, but had a different climax. It also marked the first time Shah and Arshad Warsi appeared in the same film and the last film produced by Prakash Mehra.

== Soundtrack ==
No.	Title	Singer(s)	Length
1.	"Nach Meri Jaan Nach Nach"	Hema Sardesai, Sukhwinder Singh
2.	"Tere Ishq Ka Jadu"	Sukhwinder Singh, Jaspinder Narula
3.	"Kahoji Tumse Acha Kaun Hai"	Sonu Nigam, Anaida
4.	"Diwane Yu Hi Nahi Aa Gaye"	Sunidhi Chauhan, Sukhwinder Singh
5.	"Zara Thehro"	Alka Yagnik, Udit Narayan

== Reception ==
Taran Adarsh of IndiaFM gave the film a one-star rating out of a maximum five while calling it an "absolute letdown". India Today described it as a "B-grade slapstick".

According to the Indian film trade website Box Office India, the film was made on an estimated budget of ₹4 crore (US$470,000) but had a worldwide gross of ₹73.34 lakh (US$87,000), thus earning the label "disaster".
