= Rabba Main Kya Karoon =

2013 Indian film by Amrit Sagar

- Theatrical release poster
- Directed by: Amrit Sagar Chopra
- Written by: Aakash Kaushik; Amrit Sagar Chopra
- Story by: Moti Sagar
- Produced by: Moti Sagar; Sheela Sagar; Meenakshi Sagar; Amrit Sagar Chopra
- Starring: Akash Sagar Chopra; Arshad Warsi; Paresh Rawal; Raj Babbar; Shakti Kapoor; Riya Sen; Himani Shivpuri; Tinu Anand
- Cinematography: Aseem Bajaj
- Edited by: Satyajeet Gazmer
- Music by: Songs: Salim–Sulaiman; Score: Akash Chopra
- Production company: Sagar Pictures Entertainment
- Distributed by: R.R.Films
- Release date: 2 August 2013
- Country: India
- Language: Hindi

Rabba Main Kya Karoon (transl. Oh god, what do I do?) is a 2013 Indian Hindi-language romantic comedy film directed by Amrit Sagar Chopra and produced by Moti Sagar. The film features Akash Sagar Chopra, Arshad Warsi, Paresh Rawal, Tahira Kochhar, and Riya Sen as main characters.

== Plot ==
Rabba Main Kya Karoon revolves around two brothers Shrawan (Arshad Warsi) and his younger brother Sahil (Akash Sagar Chopra) who are getting married lavishly in a typical Indian style in Delhi.

Sahil is eager to marry his childhood sweetheart Sneha (Tahira Kochhar), until his older brother Shrawan joins the celebration, encouraging Sahil to do what men do by cheating on his wife. Shrawan is only teaching Sahil what he learnt from their uncles (Paresh Rawal, Tinnu Anand, and Shakti Kapoor), whose mantra for a successful married life is "In order to live a happy married life, one must cheat on his wife!"

== Cast ==
- Akash Sagar Chopra as Sahil
- Tahira Kochhar as Sneha
- Arshad Warsi as Shrawan Singh Choudhary
- Riya Sen as Namrata/Nammo
- Raj Babbar as Choudhary Shebaar Karan Singh/Tauji
- Anuradha Patel as Gunjan
- Varun Sharma as Gagan
- Paresh Rawal as Popat Mama
- Sushmita Mukherjee as Babita Mami
- Shakti Kapoor as Narendra Suri/Harry
- Supriya Karnik as Bubble
- Rakesh Bedi as Sneha's Father
- Navni Parihar as Sneha's Mother
- Tinnu Anand as Gujral Mama
- Himani Shivpuri as Dolly Mama
- Tonisha Pawar as Megha
- Anmol Karnik as Bass Guitarist
- Dhruvee Haldankar as Sneha's friend

== Soundtrack ==
Rabba Main Kya Karoon

Soundtrack album
- Released: 18 July 2013
- Length: 26:34
- Label: Super Cassettes Industries
- Producer: Salim–Sulaiman

chronology
Satyagraha (2013)	Rabba Main Kya Karoon (2013)	Kaanchi: The Unbreakable (2014)

The official soundtrack was composed by duo Salim–Sulaiman and consists of 6 tracks.

No.	Title	Lyrics	Singer(s)	Length
1.	"Khulla Saand"	Amitabh Bhattacharya	Salim Merchant	03:47
2.	"Muh Meetha Kara De"	Amitabh Bhattacharya	Benny Dayal & Monali Thakur	04:23
3.	"Rabba Main Kya Karoon"	Amitabh Bhattacharya	Benny Dayal, Raj Pandit & Vidhi Sharma	04:33
4.	"Dua"	Zaheer Anwar	Akash Sagar Chopra	05:18
5.	"Bari Barsi"	Sham Balkar	Labh Janjua	05:16
6.	"Brandy"	Akash Sagar Chopra & Satyadev Singh	Akash Sagar Chopra & Satyadev Singh	03:17
Total length:				26:34
