= Hero Hindustani =

1998 Indian Hindi-language comedy-drama film

- Directed by: Aziz Sejawal
- Written by: Kader Khan (dialogues)
- Screenplay by: Yunus Sajawal
- Story by: Yunus Sajawal
- Starring: Arshad Warsi; Namrata Shirodkar; Kader Khan; Paresh Rawal
- Cinematography: Nazeeb Khan
- Edited by: Waman Bhosle
- Music by: Anu Malik
- Release date: 23 October 1998
- Language: Hindi

Hero Hindustani is a 1998 Indian Hindi-language romantic comedy film directed by Aziz Sejawal. It stars Arshad Warsi and Namrata Shirodkar in lead roles. It has screenplay by Yunus Sajawal and was written by Kader Khan.

== Plot ==
Purushottam Agarwal (Paresh Rawal) shifts to London for a better life. He wants his granddaughter Nikki (Namrata Shirodkar) to respect Indian culture and marry an Indian man. Initially, Nikki rejects it because she is already in love with Rohit. But, pressured by her grandfather's stubborn attitude, she plans to move to India. In India, she meets a tourist guide, named Rommie (Arshad Warsi). She hatches a plan to fool her grandfather by faking her marriage to Rommie. Then she plans to allow Rommie to act as a villainous person in front of Purushottam so that he changes his views about Indian grooms. She presents Rommie as a wealthy man to Purushottam. Nikki and Rommie both initially hate each other. As per the plan, Rommie makes every attempt to act negative but destiny does not seem to support him. Every attempt takes him closer to Purushottam's heart. Will Purushottam ever come to know about the plan?

== Cast ==
- Arshad Warsi as Rommie
- Namrata Shirodkar as Namrata 'Nikki' Agarwal
- Kader Khan as Topi
- Paresh Rawal as Dadaji / Purshotam Harnam Agarwal
- Parmeet Sethi as Rohit
- Shakti Kapoor as Cadbury
- Asrani as Cameroon
- Bharat Kapoor as Ranveer Singh
- Pramod Muthu as Rashid
- Shehzad Khan as The Police Officer
- Pappu Polyester
- Amitabh Bachchan as Narrator

== Soundtrack ==
Hero Hindustani

Soundtrack album by Anu Malik
- Released: 1998
- Genre: Feature film soundtrack
- Label: T-Series

All music is composed by Anu Malik.

Songs
No.	Title	Lyrics	Playback	Length
1.	"Aadha Ticket Mera Full Ho Gaya"	Prayag Raj	Abhijeet
2.	"Aisi Waisi Baat Nahin"	Rahat Indori	Roop Kumar Rathod, Alka Yagnik, Ila Arun
3.	"Chaand Nazar Aa Gaya"	Gauhar Kanpuri	Sonu Nigam, Alka Yagnik, Iqbal, Afzal
4.	"Deewana Deewana Main Tera"	Zameer Qazmi	Kumar Sanu, Sadhana Sargam
5.	"Hero Hindustani"	Rahat Indori	Kumar Sanu, Alka Yagnik
6.	"Hero Hindustani" (Sad)	Rahat Indori	Alka Yagnik
7.	"Maahe Ramzan"	Gauhar Kanpuri	Sonu Nigam, Alka Yagnik, Iqbal, Afzal
8.	"Saawal Saawal"	Dev Kohli	Ataullah Khan
