= Hulchul (2004 film) =

2004 Indian film by Priyadarshan

- Theatrical release poster
- Directed by: Priyadarshan
- Written by: Neeraj Vora
- Dialogues by: K. P. Saxena
- Story by: Siddique–Lal
- Based on: Godfather by Siddique–Lal
- Produced by: Ganesh Jain; Ratan Jain
- Starring: Akshaye Khanna; Kareena Kapoor; Suniel Shetty; Paresh Rawal; Jackie Shroff; Arshad Warsi; Arbaaz Khan; Amrish Puri; Laxmi
- Cinematography: Jeeva
- Edited by: Arun Kumar
- Music by: Vidyasagar
- Production company: Venus Films
- Distributed by: Venus Films
- Release date: 26 November 2004
- Running time: 149 minutes
- Country: India
- Language: Hindi
- Budget: ₹10 crore
- Box office: ₹32.86 crore

Hulchul (transl. Commotion) is a 2004 Indian Hindi-language romantic comedy film directed by Priyadarshan. A remake of the 1991 Malayalam film Godfather, the film stars an ensemble cast starring Akshaye Khanna, Kareena Kapoor, Suniel Shetty, Paresh Rawal, Jackie Shroff, Arshad Warsi, Arbaaz Khan, Amrish Puri, Laxmi, Farha Naaz, Shakti Kapoor, Manoj Joshi, and Asrani.

== Plot ==
Angar Chand lives a rich lifestyle in a small Indian town with his wife and four sons Balram, Kishan, Shakti, and baby Jai. The eldest son, Balram falls for Dhamini, who reciprocates his feelings. Though her mother Laxmi opposes this, Angar wants their wedding.

Dhamini is forcefully married off to Justice Kashinath Pathak by Laxmi. Dhamini's father, Sanjeev, accidentally kills Angar's wife Parvati. Enraged, Angar kills Sanjeev and is jailed for 14 years. After being released from jail, Angar returns home to declare that women will not be allowed on his property, posting a sign on the front gate and forbidding his sons to ever marry. 6 years later, Dhamini's daughter Anjali is in college with Jai, Angar's youngest son. Angar learns Anjali will marry the state's Home Minister. Having kept a grudge against women, he breaks the wedding by political pressure.

Laxmi instigates Anjali and asks her to pretend be in love with Jai for revenge so that they can defeat Angar. Seeing Anjali's interest in him, Jai also pretends to be in love with her for revenge, so that Laxmi gets defeated. However, things take a turn when they really fall in love and start a relationship. It is revealed that Angar's second son, Kishan, is married to a dance teacher named Gopi for seven years and has two children. Angar finds out about this and kicks Kishan out as well as Jai, as Jai supports Kishan. Jai goes to Anjali's house and reveals their relationship. Laxmi believes that Anjali has not yet told Jai about her plan for revenge, but is shocked when Anjali reciprocates his feelings. Laxmi fixes Anjali's marriage with her lawyer's son, Satyendra. She asks Angar Chand to keep a watch on the wedding venue, so that Jai will not enter the wedding. Angar, in a bid to defeat his son, agrees to safeguard it.

On the wedding day, Jai enters the venue with the help of Veeru (Laxmi's son). He knocks Satyendra unconscious and dresses as the groom. He goes through marriage rituals but reveals himself at end of the ceremony, finally marrying Anjali. She asks Laxmi to end the feud. Jai asks Angar to forgive him, who leaves and contemplates all his sons' actions. Anjali and Gopi are finally welcomed into the family, with the four sons.

== Cast ==
- Akshaye Khanna as Jai Chand
- Kareena Kapoor as Anjali Pathak
- Amrish Puri as Angar Chand
- Laxme as Laxmi Devi Anpara, Anjali's maternal grandmother
- Suniel Shetty as Veer
- Jackie Shroff as Balram "Balli" Chand
- Paresh Rawal as Kishan Chand / "Murari"
- Arbaaz Khan as Shakti Chand
- Arshad Warsi as Lucky Bhalla, Jai's best friend
- Farah Naaz as Gopi Kishan Chand, Kishan's wife
- Shakti Kapoor as Kashinath Pathak, Anjali's father and Laxmi's son-in-law
- Manoj Joshi as Advocate Namdev Mishra, Laxmi's advocate
- Asrani as Advocate Milind Sharma, Angar's advocate
- Akhilendra Mishra as Surya Anpara, Anjali's maternal uncle
- Deep Dhillon as Pratap Anpara, Anjali's maternal uncle
- Upasana Singh as Ramila Surya Anpara, Surya's wife
- Ada Puri as Raakhi Pratap Anpara, Pratap's wife
- Sharad Kelkar as Dr. Satyendra "Sattu" Mishra, Advocate Mishra's son
- Baburaj as a rowdy

== Soundtrack ==
According to the Indian trade website Box Office India, with around 10,00,000 units sold, this film's soundtrack album was the year's fourteenth highest-selling. Vidyasagar reused four tunes from his previous compositions with slight changes: "Rafta Rafta" is based on "Aasai Aasai" from the 2003 Tamil film Dhool and "Karimizhi Kuruviye" from the 2002 Malayalam film Meesa Madhavan, "Ishq Mein Pyaar Mein" is based on "Thaamara Poovukku" from the 1995 Tamil film Pasumpon, and "Hum Dil Ke" is based on the Tamil song "Panikaatrey" from the 2002 Tamil film Run, respectively. The lyrics are penned by Sameer.

All music is composed by Vidyasagar.

Songs
No.	Title	Playback	Length
1.	"Dekho Zara Dekho"	Udit Narayan, Kunal Ganjawala	5:47
2.	"Hum Dil Ke"	Shaan, Sadhana Sargam	4:56
3.	"Lut Gayee"	Gayatri, Sayonara Philip, Poornima	5:19
4.	"Ishq Mein Pyar Mein"	Shaan, Alka Yagnik	4:57
5.	"Lee Humne Thi Kasam"	Hariharan	4:49
6.	"Rafta Rafta"	Udit Narayan, Sujatha Mohan	5:17

== Reception ==
Taran Adarsh of IndiaFM gave the film 3 out if 5, writing, "On the whole, HULCHUL works two ways. It'll appeal to those who enjoy light entertainers and also those who like family drama kind of situations." Anupama Chopra of India Today praised the "humour" of first half of the film but criticised the second half of the film, writing, "Then, for reasons unknown, the director decides to get heavy-handed. The humour is diluted by melodrama, an item number and violence. The change in tracks derails the film. Which is a pity."

Conversely, Raja Sen of Rediff.com called the film a "painful watch", writing, "Hulchul, as a film, is worse than that glue-bowl: equally extraneous and redundant, but much more irritating."

== Awards and nominations ==
=== 50th Filmfare Awards ===
Nominations

- Best Comedian – Arshad Warsi
- Best Comedian – Paresh Rawal
