= Shehzad Khan =

Indian actor (born 1966)

Shahzad Khan
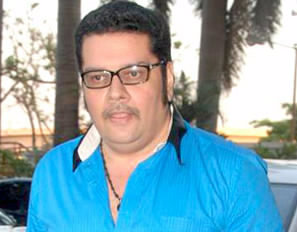
- Shahzad Khan in 2012
- Born: Shahzad Ali Khan; 25 October 1966 (age 59)
- Occupation: Actor
- Years active: 1988 – present
- Parent: Ajit Khan
- Family: Arbaaz Ali Khan (brother)

Shehzad Khan is an Indian actor who appeared in Bollywood films and TV serials.

== Early life ==
He is the son of actor Ajit Khan, best known for his roles as villain, and Sarah, who was half-Canadian, and alongside his two brothers, Arbaaz (who has also acted in few films) and Abid, he grew up in Hyderabad.

== Career ==
Khan made his acting debut in 1988 film Qayamat Se Qayamat Tak. He is better known for his role of "Bhalla" in 1994 film Andaz Apna Apna. He is also popularly known for his character Tiger in the hit TV serial Shaka Laka Boom Boom. He also sang and wrote an album called Asli Loin Mix along with Sony BMG. He also tried his luck in production by producing a film titled Funda Apna Apna (2010), which never saw the light of release. He has mostly played henchmen or sidekicks to villains, but is known for his comic style of acting.

== Filmography ==
Year	Film	Role	Notes
1988	Som Mangal Shani		
1988	Qayamat Se Qayamat Tak	Shahid Khan	
1988	Sala Ghudda		
1989	Abhi To Main Jawan Hoon		
1989	Purani Haveli	Anand	
1989	Khooni Murda		
1992	Kizhakkan Pathrose	Chandy Muthalali's Son	Malayalam film
1993	Dhartiputra	Mahipal Singh	
1993	Tirangaa	Police Inspector	Special appearance
1993	Teri Payal Mere Geet		
1994	Andaaz Apna Apna	Vinod Bhalla	
1995	Barsaat	Khan Bhai	
1996	Hum Hain Khalnayak		
1997	Vishwa Vidhaata		
1998	Tirchhi Topiwale		
1998	Haste Hasate	Prince	
1998	Gharwali Baharwali		
1998	Bade Miyan Chote Miyan	Inspector	
1998	Hero Hindustani	Police Officer	
1999	Sikandar Sadak Ka		
1999	Shera	Munna	
1999	Chudail No. 1		
1999	Trishakti	Inspector Tiwari	
1999	Sindu - The Knowledge River		
2000	Jwalamukhi	Private Police Rana Jung Bahadur	
2000	Woh Bewafa Thi		
2000	The Naked Truth		
2000	Mera Saaya		
2000	The Revenge: Geeta Mera Naam	Phatak Singh	
2000	Kabrastan		
2001	Shaheed-E-Kargil		
2001	Officer		
2001	Ek Lootere		
2001	Ittefaq	Santa	
2001	Arjun Devaa	Kishanlal	
2002	Onnaman	City Police Commissioner Karunakaran	Malayalam film
2002	The Legend of Bhagat Singh	Khairu	as Shahzad Khan
2002	Kitne Door Kitne Paas	Police Inspector K.K. Limbachia	
2003	Khanjar: The Knife	Shaji	
2003	Mumbai Matinee	Don	
2004	Dil Bechara Pyaar Ka Maara		
2006	Jawani Diwani	Mannu Malik	
2006	Tom, Dick and Harry		
2006	Bhoot Unkle	Robert	as Shezad Khan
2008	Mr. Black Mr. White		
2008	Humsey Hai Jahaan	Gyaneshwar Singh	
2009	Kirkit		
2011	Chargesheet	Marian	
2011	Loot	Lala's brother	
2012	Daal Mein Kuch Kaala Hai		
2014	Chal Bhaag		
2018	Jawani Phir Nahi Ani 2	Sher Ali's father	
2019	Bharat	Surahil Azim: National Employment Exchange Officer	
2020	Kaamyaab	Himself	
2024	Naam	Mansoor Khan	

=== Television ===
Year	Serial	Role	Notes
1994	Hello Bollywood		
1995	Captain House		
1996–1998	Yug	Son of Thakur	
1997–1998	Betaal Pachisi	Shahdie	
1997–1998	Ghar Jamai	Various characters	2 episodes
1998–1999	Hudd Kar Di	Pathan	
1999–2000	Hello Friends		
2000-2003	Gharwali Uparwali	fraud Godman	
2000–2004	Shaka Laka Boom Boom	Tiger	
2005	Fooltoo Pagal Hai	Tiger	
2006	F.I.R	Terrorist	Guest
2016	Best of Luck Nikki	Firoz Umang Sonawala	
2023	Taarak Mehta Ka Ooltah Chashmah	Danger Mani Bhai	
