= Trishakti =

- Directed by: Madhur Bhandarkar
- Screenplay by: Latesh Shah; Manish Mehta
- Story by: Madhur Bhandarkar
- Produced by: Hina Dilip Dhanwani; Rafiq Latiwala
- Starring: Arshad Warsi; Sharad Kapoor; Milind Gunaji; Radhika
- Edited by: Deepak Y. Virkud; Vilas Ranade
- Music by: Rajesh Roshan
- Production company: Bombino Video
- Release date: 6 August 1999 (India)
- Running time: 168 minutes
- Country: India
- Language: Hindi

Trishakti is a 1999 Indian Hindi-language crime film directed by Madhur Bhandarkar. It stars Arshad Warsi, Sharad Kapoor, Milind Gunaji and Radhika in pivotal roles.

== Plot ==
Rajeshwar Raja is the uncrowned don of the criminal world in Bombay, India. Working under his directions are Hasan Lalla and Hamid Pathan. Then Hasan Lalla decides to separate, and forms his own gang, which does not augur well with Raja. Things get worse between the two, resulting in a gang war resulting in many casualties on both sides, with the police stepping in and taking advantage of this situation. Then one day while Hamid is being attacked by Hasan's men, three men, Bajrang, Sagar Malhotra, and Mahesh alias Munnabhai, come to his rescue, and ensure that he is admitted in hospital for his injuries. A grateful Raja recruits the three in his gang, and asks them to attempt to bring Hasan down, which they agree to do. When the underworld finds out about the daring deeds of these three, and the manner in which Hasan has been subdued and forced to retreat, they start believing that Raja is no longer in control, resulting in Raja feeling threatened, and deciding to end his relationship with these three. He plots to create misunderstandings, and enlists a devious scheme in which Mahesh and Sagar are arrested by the police, and Bajrang becomes the one who is responsible. A visibly upset Bajrang tries to clarify things to his two friends, but to no avail. It looks like Raja has once again succeeded in his overtures to be the sole and unchallenged don of the criminal underworld.

== Cast ==
- Arshad Warsi as Sagar Malhotra
- Sharad Kapoor as Mahesh
- Milind Gunaji as Bajrang
- Keerthi Chawla as Priyanka
- Sadashiv Amrapurkar as Inspector Dayal
- Jatin Kanakia as Home Minister Vishwanath Pradhan
- Shehzad Khan as Inspector Tiwari
- Govind Namdeo as Hasan Lalla
- Ashish Vidyarthi as Rajeshwar Raja
- Tiku Talsania as Laxmiprasad
- Himani Shivpuri as Mrs. Razia Laxmiprasad
- Anil Nagrath as Minister Raj Narain
- Tej Sapru as Hamid Pathan

== Soundtrack ==
Music composed by Rajesh Roshan, while Mehboob wrote the songs for the soundtrack.

#	Title	Singer(s)
1	"Doston Ke Liye Aaj"	Kumar Sanu, Udit Narayan & Sonu Nigam
2	"Kabhi Na Kabhi"	Udit Narayan
3	"Kaho To Kuch Kaise"	Aditi Sahani & Vickey J
4	"Paisa Paisa Paisa"	Sonu Nigam, Altaf Raja & Preeti Uttam
5	"Yeh Sara Jahan Pagal Pagal"	Udit Narayan, Vinod Rathod & Sonu Nigam
