= Razzmatazz (Indian TV series) =

- Created by: Urban Brew Studios
- Directed by: Sabbas Joseph
- Presented by: Arshad Warsi & Shweta Menon
- Country of origin: India
- No. of seasons: 1
- No. of episodes: 15

Production
- Running time: 52 minutes

Original release
- Network: Zee TV
- Release: 2 September 2001

Razzmatazz is an Indian dance reality show and competition that was broadcast on Zee TV in 2001. It The show was hosted by Arshad Warsi and Shweta Menon.

== Show format ==
The contestants' are divided into two separate groups, where the contestants' from each of the group perform their dancing skills to obtain points.
