= Ek Se Bure Do =

Ek Se Bure Dono
- Directed by: Tariq Khan
- Written by: Nisar Akhtar
- Produced by: Suresh Bhagat
- Starring: Arshad Warsi; Anita Hassanandani Rajpal Yadav
- Music by: Ravi Pawar
- Production company: Filmsland Entertainment
- Release date: 10 April 2009
- Running time: 172 minutes
- Country: India
- Language: Hindi

Ek Se Bure Do is a 2009 Bollywood black comedy film directed by Tarique Khan and starring Arshad Warsi, Anita Hassanandani and Rajpal Yadav. The film was shot in 2007 but released in 2009.

== Plot ==
Tito (Arshad Warsi) and Tony (Rajpal Yadav) are two conmen who run into and fall in love with two sisters, Payal (Anita Hassanandani) and Gehna (Tusha). The girls have run away from their home and uncle, Vikramaditya (Govind Namdeo). Meanwhile, small-time don Jagat Dada (also played by Govind Namdeo) enlists the help of Tito-Tony to steal a treasure map from a police station. Tito-Tony accomplishes the task but, instead of giving Jagat the real map, they hand him a fake copy forged by Mamu (Razak Khan), So, while Jagat and his men so, in a futile search for the treasure, Tito-Tony go after the real one, which is in Vikramaditya's house. Soon, Jagat realizes that he has been conned and also becomes aware that he looks like Vikramaditya. Since Vikramaditya is away from home, Jagat Dada goes into his house pretending to be Vikramaditya. The chase for the fortune begins in earnest and after the mandatory mix-ups; the police come and arrest Jagat Dada and his men.

== Cast ==
- Arshad Warsi as Tito
- Anita Hassanandani as Payal
- Rajpal Yadav as Tony
- Tusha as Gehna
- Govind Namdeo as Vikramaditya / Jagat Dada
- Lankesh Bhardwaj as Deva
- Yashpal Sharma
- Jagdeep

== Soundtrack ==
No.	Title	Singer(s)	Length
1.	"Ishq Ki Zaat"	Daler Mehndi, Kalpana Patowary
2.	"Aaisa Pehli Bar"	Sunidhi Chauhan, Suzanne D'Mello
3.	"Jaana Jaana"	Harshdeep Kaur, Hema Sardesai, Shaan
4.	"Ek Se Bure Do"	Sonu Nigam, Vinod Rathod
5.	"Meri Har Ada Ke Charche"	Sonu Kakkar

== Reception ==
The film received negative reviews. The Hindustan Times gave it a rating of 0, saying "this is a movie that sends you home somewhat worried — about your own well-being and that of Hindi cinema", while The Indian Express found the film difficult to sit through and watch. Bollywood Hungama gave the film two and a half out of five, calling it "a classic example of been there, seen that, moved on. There has been a barrage of nonsensical comedies. Now add one more name to the list."
