= Shashanka Ghosh =

Indian filmmaker and writer

- Occupations: Film director, writer

Shashanka Ghosh is an Indian filmmaker and writer. As a director, his notable works include the commercially successful films like Khoobsurat and Veere Di Wedding. As a writer, he penned the story for Waisa Bhi Hota Hai Part II, he was also the director of the film. Ghosh was the Creative Director of Channel V in the late 90s.

== Filmography ==
=== Director ===
Movie	Year	Notes
Waisa Bhi Hota Hai Part II	2003	
Quick Gun Murugun	2009	English film
Mumbai Cutting	2010	Anthology film; Segment: 10 Minutes
Khoobsurat	2014	
Veere Di Wedding	2018	
House Arrest	2019	Netflix film
Hey Prabhu!	2019-2021	Television series on MX Player
Plan A Plan B	2022	Netflix film
Freddy	2022	Released on Disney+ Hotstar

=== Writer ===
- Waisa Bhi Hota Hai Part II (2003)
- What the Fish (2013)

=== Actor ===
Year	Title	Role	Notes
2008	Aamir	Goon	
