= Kisse Pyaar Karoon =

Kisse Pyaar Karon
- Directed by: Ajay Chandhok
- Written by: Yunus Sajawal
- Screenplay by: Yunus Sajawal
- Produced by: Bala Kumar
- Starring: Arshad Warsi; Aashish Chaudhary; Yash Tonk; Udita Goswami; Aarti Chhabria
- Cinematography: Najeeb Khan
- Music by: Daboo Malik
- Release date: 27 February 2009
- Country: India
- Language: Hindi

Kisse Pyaar Karoon (transl. Who should I love?) is a 2009 Indian comedy film directed by Ajay Chandok. The film stars Arshad Warsi, Aashish Chaudhary and Yash Tonk.

== Plot ==
The movie revolves around John, Sid, and Amit, who are three college students nearing graduation. The three of them have been friends since childhood and now live together in Sid's dilapidated bungalow. John has been in love with his classmate Natasha for a long time but has never able to express his love. After graduation, Amit and Sid visit Munna, a gangster who treats the two of them like his sons. Munna Bhai gives them a job as a three-man Punjabi band for hire at weddings.

John decides to visit Natasha to express his feelings but is too late as she had left for a world tour. Subsequently, John becomes extremely sad and cannot stop thinking of Natasha. At a wedding performance, John's sadness brings down the vibe of a wedding where they were performing at, resulting in the three of them getting beaten up by the wedding guests. The doctor treating them suggests to Sid and Amit that they should get John's mind off Natasha to bring back his happiness. Thus, they decide to hire a prostitute for John.

Consequently, Amit finds Chameli, who instantly falls in love with Amit and is willing to marry him. Amit hesitantly rejects her offer and pays her money to go to John. John bores Chameli by only talking about Natasha, which meant Sid and Amit's plan to cheer up John failed. Later, while the three were at a pool, John looks at Sheetal and is immediately attracted to her. To Sid and Amit's surprise, the two of them hit it off well.

As John and Sheetal get closer, he invites her to Sid's bungalow. Sheetal is disgusted by the unhygienic and uncivilised ways in which the three of them live. She puts forth an ultimatum to John to choose between her or his friends. He chooses Sheetal over his friends, and she starts driving Sid and Amit away from John by not letting them meet him. This concerned Sid and Amit, who felt she was extremely controlling. Thus, they started looking for ways to drive them apart. First, Sid and Amit tried to bribe Sheetal with Sid's bungalow to leave John, which she unequivocally declined. After that failed, they decided to Photoshop John onto intimate pictures with Chameli (who now called herself Julie) and mail it to Sheetal. This plan also failed, as Sheetal immediately recognised the photos were morphed.

John approaches his father as he decides to marry Sheetal, despite his father's approval. His father, Albert D'Monto, is a rich businessman running a toy manufacturing company. He disowns John, as he does not approve of the marriage. It is revealed that Sheetal is actually working for a weapons smuggler named AK 47. He wants Sheetal to enter John's home and take control of Albert D'Monto's business, which they will use as a front to smuggle weapons. Since Albert D'Monto disapproved of the marriage, AK 47 decides to kill him. He uses Inspector Jadhav;to stage the murder as the work of a runaway criminal. At Albert's funeral, John confronts Sid and Amit for all the things they did to drive a wedge between him and Sheetal and warns them to stay away.

Even though John's disdain hurt Sid and Amit, they were still determined to save him from Sheetal. During this time, they encounter Natasha, who was back from her tour. They tell her all about John and Sheetal, which is when Natasha reveals she was also in love with John all this while. They decide to introduce Natasha into John's life again so that he may leave Sheetal. Contrary to their hopes, Natasha's reappearance does not affect John much. So, Sid and Amit decide to kidnap Sheetal. They leave a car to blow up in the forest to make it look like Sheetal died, when in fact she was held hostage at Sid's place. With John thinking Sheetal died, Natasha comes forth to support him, and they start dating.

Sid and Sheetal start developing feelings for each other during the time she was held hostage at his house. It creates a rift between Sid and Amit. A dejected Amit goes to Munna Bhai and tells him about the entire kidnapping plan and how Sheetal is creating problems between him and Sid. Munna Bhai suggests that Amit have her killed. He tells Amit to contact AK 47 to do the job. When he contacts AK 47, he gets shot at since Sheetal worked for AK 47. Luckily, Sid manages to rescue Amit, and they immediately go to the police station to report the shooting. Unfortunately, Inspector Jadhav was present at the station, who locked them up for kidnapping. AK 47 rescues Sheetal and tells her to go back to John and marry him.

John is now forced to choose between Natasha and Sheetal. He also thinks Natasha was involved in Sheetal's kidnapping, which hurt Natasha. She decides to leave for America for good. John informs Sid and Amit that he will marry Sheetal. Munna Bhai and Julie ram their car through the walls of the lockup and escape with Sid and Amit.

At John's wedding, high security is placed by AK 47 and Inspector Jadhav. Sid, Munna Bhai, and Amit disguise themselves as Amar, Akbar, and Anthony, respectively, and enter the wedding. Their disguise is soon uncovered as AK 47's goons start attacking them. Meanwhile, John finds out Natasha is with him at the pedestal and not Sheetal. Natasha tells John about Sheetal's truth. Sheetal also comes forward and reveals to John that she worked for AK 47 because he trapped her brother in the drug trade so that he could use her for his ulterior motives. When she tells him that AK 47 killed his father, he joins Sid and Amit in beating up AK 47 and his goons. Soon, Julie brings the police with her and gets AK 47 and his men arrested.

In the end, John and Natasha, Sid and Sheetal, and Amit and Julie get married together at the same ceremony.

== Cast ==
- Arshad Warsi as Siddharth "Sid"
- Ashish Chaudhary as John D'Monto
- Yash Tonk as Amit
- Udita Goswami as Sheetal
- Aarti Chhabria as Natasha
- Ashish Vidyarthi as Munna Bhai
- Shakti Kapoor as AK 47
- Vindu Dara Singh as Inspector Jadhav
- Adi Irani as Albert D'Monto

== Soundtrack ==
The soundtrack for Kisse Pyaar Karoon was composed by Daboo Malik and the lyrics were written by Shabbir Ahmed.

#	Title	Singer(s)	Length
1	"Kisse Pyaar Karoon"	Shaan, Daboo Malik	05:07
2	"Aahoon Aahoon"	Sonu Nigam, Sunidhi Chauhan	05:16
3	"Sanam Sanam"	Shaan, Shreya Ghoshal	05:07
4	"Chunar Chunar"	Shreya Ghoshal, Rahul Vaidya	04:48
5	"Jahan Tak Ye Meri Nazar"	Shaan, Shreya Ghoshal	04:34
6	"Kisse Pyaar Karoon (DJ Aqeel Remix)"	Shaan, Sunidhi Chauhan	04:31
7	"Aahoon Aahoon (Remix)"	Sonu Nigam, Sunidhi Chauhan	03:02

== Reception ==
The film was a box-office disaster, according to Box Office India. Taran Adarsh of Bollywood Hungama rated the film one out of five stars, calling the writing "archaic and outdated" and concluding it as a "masala film may've struck a chord a few years ago, not today". Shashi Baliga of Hindustan Times gave the film zero stars.
