= Warsi =

Warsi or Warisi (pronounced [ˈʋaːrsiː]) is a surname found among South Asian Muslims. Numerous disciples of Waris Ali Shah, both Muslims and Hindus, add Warisi or Warsi to their names. Notable people with the name include:

- Waris Ali Shah (1817–1905), Indian Sufi saint, founder of Warsi Sufi order
- Syed Imran Ali Warsi, Pakistani field hockey player
- Anil Shukla Warsi (born 1957), Indian politician
- Arshad Warsi (born 1966), Indian actor
- Sayeeda Warsi, Baroness Warsi (born 1971), British politician
- Kamal Warsi, Pakistani leftist activist
- Muzaffar Warsi (1933–2011), Pakistani Urdu poet
- Nisha Warsi (born 1995), Indian field hockey player
- Perween Warsi (born 1956), British-Indian entrepreneur
- Raees Warsi (born 1963), Pakistani-American Urdu poet
- Ram Ekbal Singh Warsi (1922–2016), Indian freedom fighter and politician
- M J Warsi, Indian linguist, researcher and author
- Warsi Brothers, Indian qawwali musical group

== See also ==
- Warisi (king), 11th-century Hausa king in what is now northern Nigeria
