= Screen Award for Best Supporting Actor =

Award for best supporting actor

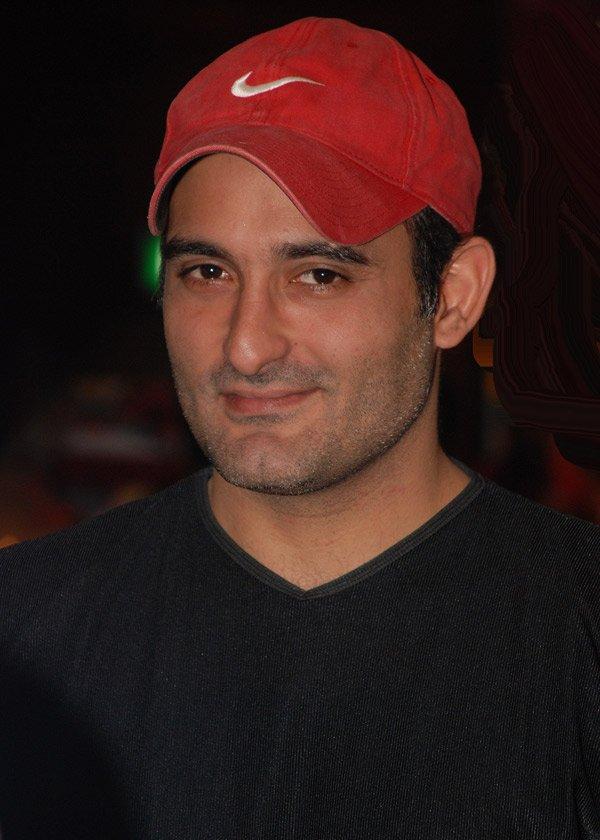
- The 2026 recipient: Akshaye Khanna
- Awarded for: Best Performance by an Actor in a Supporting Role
- Country: India
- Presented by: Screen India
- First award: Anupam Kher, 1942: A Love Story (1995)
- Currently held by: Akshaye Khanna, Dhurandhar (2025)

The Screen Award for Best Supporting Actor is chosen by a distinguished panel of judges from the Indian "Bollywood" film industry and the winners are announced in January. The first award was given to Anupam Kher. Saif Ali Khan, having won the award thrice, has more awards than any other actor in this category.

== Multiple wins ==
Wins	Recipient
3	Saif Ali Khan
2	Amrish Puri, Arshad Warsi, Rishi Kapoor

== Winners ==
Year	Winner	Film	Character
1995	Anupam Kher	1942: A Love Story	Raghuvir Pathak
1996	Paresh Rawal	Raja	Brijnath Patangwala
1997	Amrish Puri	Ghatak: Lethal	Shambhu Nath
1998	Amrish Puri	Virasat	Raja Thakur
1999	Manoj Bajpayee	Satya	Bhiku Mhatre
2000	Anil Kapoor	Taal	Vikrant Kapoor
2001	Sanjay Dutt	Mission Kashmir	SSP Inayat Khan
2002	Saif Ali Khan	Dil Chahta Hai	Sameer Mulchandni
2003	Mohanlal	Company	Veerappalli Srinivasan
2004	Saif Ali Khan	Kal Ho Naa Ho	Rohit Patel
2005	Abhishek Bachchan	Yuva	Lallan Singh
2006	Naseeruddin Shah	Iqbal	Mohit
2007	Arshad Warsi	Lage Raho Munnabhai	Sarkeshwar "Circuit"
2008	Aamir Khan	Taare Zameen Par (Like Stars on Earth)	Ram Shankar Nikumbh
2009	Arjun Rampal	Rock On!!	Joe
2010	Rishi Kapoor	Luck by Chance	Rommy Rolly
2011	Arshad Warsi	Ishqiya	Razzak Hussain "Babban"
2012	Saif Ali Khan	Aarakshan	Deepak Kumar
2013	Nawazuddin Siddiqui	Talaash	Tehmur Hussain
2014	Saurabh Shukla	Jolly LLB	Justice Sunderlal Tripathi
2015	Inaamulhaq	Filmistaan	Aftaab
2016	Deepak Dobriyal	Tanu Weds Manu: Returns	Pappi
2017	Rishi Kapoor	Kapoor & Sons	Amarjeet Kapoor
2018	Rajkummar Rao	Bareilly Ki Barfi	Pritam Vidrohi
2019	Pankaj Tripathi	Stree	Rudra
2020	Gulshan Devaiah	Mard Ko Dard Nahi Hota	Karate Mani / Jimmy
2026	Akshaye Khanna	Dhurandhar	Rehman Dakait

== See also ==
- Screen Awards
- Bollywood
- Cinema of India
