= Roop Ki Rani Choron Ka Raja =

- Theatrical release poster
- Directed by: Satish Kaushik
- Written by: Javed Akhtar
- Produced by: Boney Kapoor
- Starring: Anil Kapoor; Sridevi; Anupam Kher; Jackie Shroff
- Cinematography: Baba Azmi
- Edited by: Waman Bhonsle; Gurudutt Shirali
- Music by: Laxmikant–Pyarelal
- Release date: 1993
- Running time: 177 minutes
- Country: India
- Language: Hindi

Roop ki Rani Choron Ka Raja (transl. The Queen of Beauty and the King of Thieves) is a 1993 Indian Hindi-language action comedy film starring Anil Kapoor, Sridevi, Anupam Kher, Johnny Lever and Jackie Shroff. It was the highest-budget Hindi film at that time. The film was directed by Satish Kaushik and written by Javed Akhtar. The project, announced in 1987, was initially directed by Shekhar Kapur, who left the project halfway through; he was subsequently replaced by Satish Kaushik.

== Plot ==
Jagmohan Laal, aka Jugran, is a crime lord who wants to climb up the crime ladder. When Customs Officer Verma tries to arrest him, he escapes. To save his skin, Jugran kills his twin brother Manmohan and takes his identity. The world is led to believe that Jugran is still on the run. Jugran kills Verma and Dr. Ashok, destroying both their families in the process. While Verma's orphaned sons, Ramesh and Ravi, are separated from each other, Dr. Ashok's daughter, Seema, is left with her distraught mother, who has lost her sanity.

Many years later, Jugran has become a big name in the criminal underworld. He lives a double life, acting also as his twin brother Manmohan, who is highly respected in society. Ravi Verma, meanwhile, has become an Inspector and Ramesh has become a crook – a safecracker by the name of Romeo. The brothers are unaware of each other's identities, but there is one thing that binds them together: one has a lock, the other has the only key that can open the lock. Seema too has become a crook, called Simmi, and her path starts crossing with Romeo's. Romeo is now working for Seth Girdharilal, who mentors many thieves and thugs like him.

Only Ravi knows that Jugran killed his father. One day, Seema runs into "Manmohan", and realizes that it was he who had killed her father. Jugran himself needs somebody to pull a Rs 100 crore robbery. He meets her (as Jugran) and tells her that he will need her help to involve Romeo in the operation. Simmi hesitates, until Jugran reveals that he knows the identity of her father's murderer. She meets Romeo and tries to seduce him, but Romeo berates her. Simmi reveals her story to him. Romeo is surprised to see Simmi's mother, since it means that Simmi is actually his childhood sweetheart, Seema.

He reveals his true identity to Seema, and the two pair up. Meanwhile, Ravi too gets an inkling that Jugran is planning something big with the help of Simmi and Romeo. Ravi and Romeo run into each other, only to learn that they are brothers. After many twists and turns, Simmi and Romeo finally succeed in turning over the loot to Jugran. After this, he binds and gags them after telling Simmi the truth, leaving the pair to die by falling into a container of boiling acid. They are saved by Romeo's pet pigeon.

Romeo and Simmi escape, but they get separated from each other. Romeo runs into Ravi, whereupon the latter tries to arrest him. After Romeo tells him the truth, an enraged Ravi reveals to Ramesh that Jugran killed their father too. Ramesh escapes and rejoins Simmi. When he sees "Manmohan" on TV, Ramesh tells Seema that Manmohan and Jugran are the same person. Meanwhile, Ravi gets a tip-off, upon which he turns up at a party almost simultaneously with Ramesh and Seema. Ramesh reveals that when his pigeon perched on Jugran's left hand, it left claw marks, just as seen on Manmohan's left hand. Therefore, Manmohan and Jugran are same person.

Ravi scoffs at the claim and tells them that Manmohan's fingerprints are available and it won't be difficult to find out that Manmohan and Jugran are indeed two different people. Seeing that his charade is about to come to an abrupt end, Jugran tries to run away. It is revealed that Ramesh had given the tip-off about Jugran to Ravi. Jugran succeeds in escaping, while his men try to kill Ravi, Ramesh, and Seema. The three manage to fight their way to Jugran, who himself tries to shoot them. The trio quickly retaliates, killing him on spot.

== Cast ==
- Anil Kapoor as Ramesh Verma/Romeo
- Sridevi as Seema Soni/Simmi
- Jackie Shroff as Ravi Verma
- Anupam Kher as Jagmohan "Jugran" Laal / Manmohan Laal
- Akash Khurana as Uncle D'Souza
- Paresh Rawal as Seth Girdharilal
- Bindu as Yashudhara Devi
- Ajit Vachani as S. P. Pathak
- Dalip Tahil as Mr. Verma (Guest Appearance)
- Johnny Lever as Sub-Inspector Rang Birangi Lal Chauhan
- Anjan Srivastav as Mr. Naran
- Razak Khan as Keshav
- Ram Sethi as Dr. Ashok (Guest Appearance)

== Reception ==
Despite high expectations, the film failed badly at the box office. Arun Katiyar of India Today wrote, "In the end, however, it is Kaushik's determination to make a commercial film that tells a tale of revenge and lost-love with startling dignity that wins-and gravity be damned."

== Music ==
The music was performed by Laxmikant–Pyarelal, with the lyrics being penned by Javed Akhtar.

1. "Roop Ki Rani Choron Ka Raja" (Rap) - Bali Bhramabhatt, Suneeta Rao
2. "Romeo Naam Mera, Chori Hain Kaam Mera" - Vinod Rathod
3. "Main Hoon Roop Ki Rani" - Kavita Krishnamurthy
4. "Parda Utha" - Kavita Krishnamurthy, Amit Kumar
5. "Chai Mein Chini" - Kavita Krishnamurthy, Amit Kumar
6. "Main Ek Sone Ki Moorat Hoon" - Kavita Krishnamurthy, Amit Kumar
7. "Jaanewale Zara Ruk Ja" - Kavita Krishnamurthy, Vinod Rathod
8. "Dushman Dil Ka Jo Hain Mere - Kavita Krishnamurthy
9. "Tu Roop Ki Rani Main Choron Ka Raja" - Kavita Krishnamurthy, Amit Kumar
