= Waris Ali Shah =

Indian Sufi saint (1817–1905)

Sayyid Waris Ali Shah Kazmi Al-Musavi
- Title: Imam-ul-Aulia, Ashraful Alameen, Waris-e-Panjtan, Aalam Panaah Waris

Personal life
- Born: Mitthan Miya. 16 July 1817 AD / 1 Ramzan ul Mubarak, 1232 Hijri Dewa, Barabanki, India
- Died: 7 April 1905 AD /1 safar, 1323 Hijri Dewa, Barabanki, India
- Resting place: Dewa, Barabanki, India
- Era: Early 19th century
- Region: India

Religious life
- Religion: Islam
- Denomination: Sunni
- Jurisprudence: Hanafi
- Tariqa: Warsi

Sayed Waris Ali Shah (1817–1905) was a Sufi saint from Dewa, Barabanki, India, and the founder of the Warsi Sufi order. He traveled to many places especially Europe and the west and admitted people to his spiritual order. He is claimed to belong to the 26th generation of Hazrat Imam Hussain Via Musa al-Kazim His shrine is at Dewa, India.

== Life ==
In the book "Islamic Review and Muslim India", (Kraus Reprint, 1971) it was mentioned that Waris Ali Shah was alleged to have lived his life as the Christ lived.

=== Father ===
His father's name is Sayed Qurban Ali Shah, whose tomb is in Dewa.

At an early age Shah showed an inclination for a religious life.

=== Social engagements ===
He went to Makkah for pilgrimage many times. During his travels in Europe, he visited the Sultan of Turkey and Otto von Bismarck in Berlin. He may also traveled to England and had an audience with Queen Victoria.

He was a friend of Abdul Bari.

=== Death ===
He died on 7 April 1905 (1st Safar 1323 AH).

== Sufi order ==
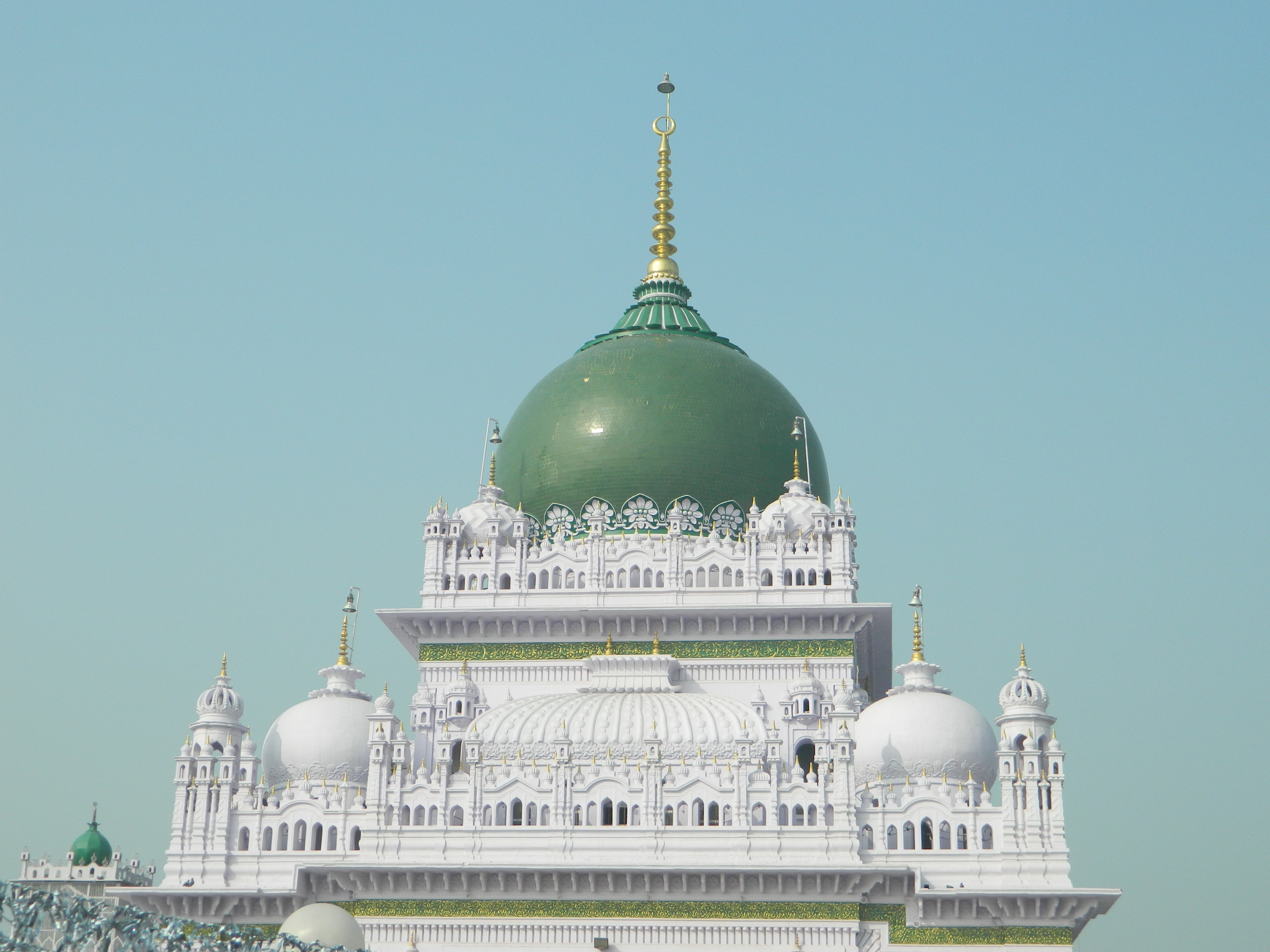
Dargah of Haji Waris Ali Shah in Dewa Shareef, Barabanki, India.

Like all other Kazmi Nishapuri Syeds of the area Waris Ali Shah belonged to the Sufi tradition tied to the awadh region which was considered Sufi educational centre of the whole indian subcontinent influenced by Kazmi Nishapuri Syeds who had lineage connection with Waris Ali Shah.

He had a liberal view and permitted his followers to follow Sufism and names may not be changed in case of one has accepted Islam. As a boy, Shah attached himself to Khadim Ali Shah, a Dervish of Golaganj, Lucknow, in the state of Uttar Pradesh, India, and remained with the latter until his death in 1832–33 when Shah was 16 years old.

== His disciples ==
He was said to have followers from several faiths, though usually he was not in constant contact with most of them.

- Bedam Shah Warsi
- Sultan Abdul Hamid II
- Ghulam Muhammad (governor general of Pakistan)
- Hakeem Safdar Ali Warisi (Mahajan Title given by Haji Saheb) writer of Jalwaye Waris (Migrate from Gadia to Bahraich on Haji Saheb's order. His Grand Son Izhar Warsi is prominent poet of Urdu.)
- Thakur Pancham Singh.
- Zamindar Dt. Mainpuri.
- Raja Udyat Narayan Sing (Suratgunj, Oudh).
- Baboo Moti Misser (Bhagalpur).
- Thakur Grur Mohan Singh, Zamindar (Bhagalpur).
- Baba Sufi Syed Diwana Shah Warsi first khalifa (roohani) and nephew (Jagatdal, West Bengal).
- Sadaf Jabbar Fazihat.
- Shah Abdul Ad Shah.
- Maulana Mohammad Shah.
- Mustaqim Shah.
- Faizu Shah
- Rahim Shah
- Hafiz Pyaari
- Shakir Shah
- Avghat Shah
- Maroof Shah
- NoorKarim Shah
- Siddiq Shah (Amethi Sultanpur U.P India
- Sai Baba of Shirdi
- Bangali Shah(Kolkata India)
- Sandal Shah (Kolkata India)
- Mushir Husain Qidwai of Gadia, a zamindar, barrister and pan-Islamist politician from Barabanki.
- Badnam Shah
- Khuda Bakhsh Sheikh was a follower of Waris Ali Shah. He collected the sayings of his spiritual guide Malfūzāt-i-Hāji Wāris 'Ali Shāh. His book, Tohmat-ul-Asfiya, is the biography of Waris Ali Shah.
- Haseen Shah warsi
- Qazi Bakhshish Ali Ansari (Yusufpur)
- Bekarar Shah Warsi
- Warsi Ghulam Mohammad Mallah
- Nizam Shah Warsi.
- Nafisullah Shah Warsi.
- Nizamuddin Shah Warsi.

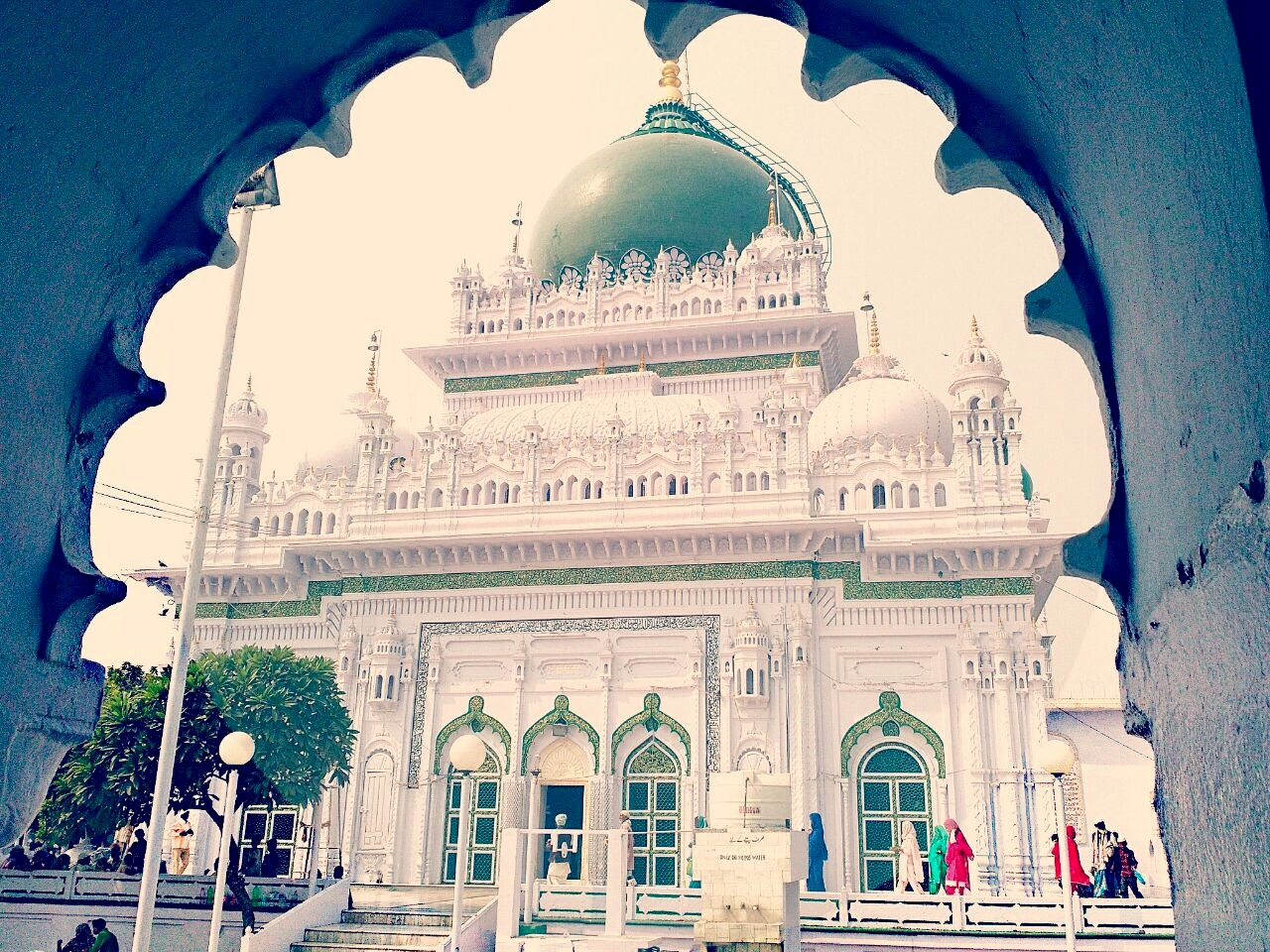
Tomb of Haji Waris Ali Shah in Dewa, barabanki Lucknow (India)

== Death anniversary ==
Shah's father's death anniversary, locally known as Dewa Mela, is observed in October–November and is attended by nearly a million Muslims and Hindus.

Shah reportedly started this event in memory of his own father, Qurban Ali Shah. Another annual fair is held in Shah's tomb on 1 Safar.

== See also ==
- Islam in India
- Sufism in India
