= Maria Goretti (actress) =

Indian actor (born 1972)

Maria Goretti Warsi
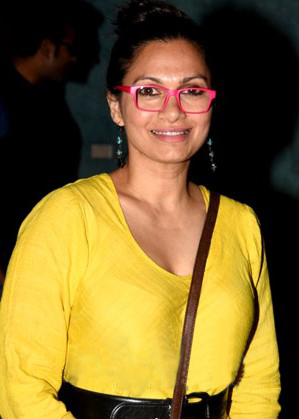
- Goretti at the screening of Sonata
- Born: 26 January 1972 (age 54); Mumbai, India
- Occupations: Actress, Model
- Years active: 1995-present
- Spouse: Arshad Warsi (m. 1996)

Maria Goretti Warsi is an Indian MTV VJ. She has hosted several TV shows including Do It Sweet on the NDTV Good Times channel and I Love Cooking on Living Foodz.

== Career ==
Goretti was a popular MTV VJ and hosted the TV show Do It Sweet on the NDTV Good Times channel. Goretti made a special appearance in the movie Salaam Namaste along with her son Zeke Warsi. She did a small role in the movie Raghu Romeo directed by Rajat kapoor and a sci-fi movie Jaane Hoga Kya. She performed the famous song of Harbhajan Mann in album Oye-Hoye "Kudi Kad Ke Kalja Leigi, Gallan Goriyan Harbhajan Mann".

== Personal life ==
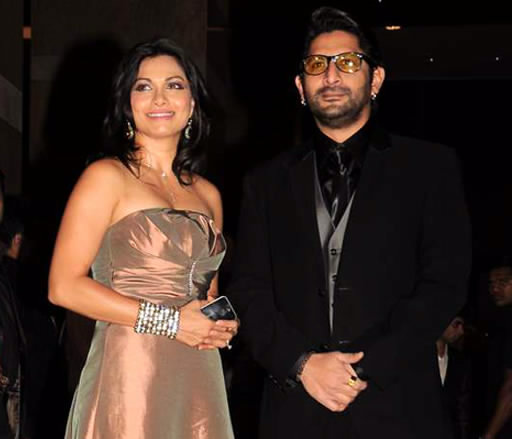
Goretti with husband Arshad Warsi in 2012

Goretti married Hindi Film actor Arshad Warsi on 14 February 1996/1999, whom she met in 1991, when he was invited to judge a dance competition in college, in which she was participating. She completed the Mumbai Marathon in 2016.
