= Taran Adarsh =

Indian film critic, trade analyst (born 1965)

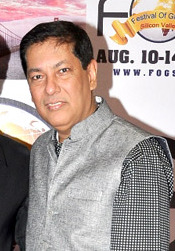
- Adarsh in 2016
- Born: 13 June 1965 (age 60); Bombay, Maharashtra, India
- Occupations: Film critic; trade analyst
- Years active: 1980–present
- Relatives: Komal Nahta (cousin)

Taran Adarsh (born 13 June 1965) is an Indian film critic and trade analyst. The son of director-producer B.K. Adarsh and actress Jaymala Adarsh, he is best known for giving trade figures and box office updates on social media, as well as his reviews for Bollywood Hungama.

== Career ==
Taran Adarsh started his journalism career at the age of 15 with Trade Guide, a weekly box office magazine. In 1994, Adarsh produced and wrote the Bollywood film-based TV serial Hello Bollywood, starring Shehzad Khan and Kashmera Shah. He continued his work on Trade Guide alongside. He is currently an active film critic, journalist and trade analyst on Bollywood Hungama, a Bollywood entertainment website.
