= Akshaye Khanna filmography =

Filmography of Indian actor Akshaye Khanna

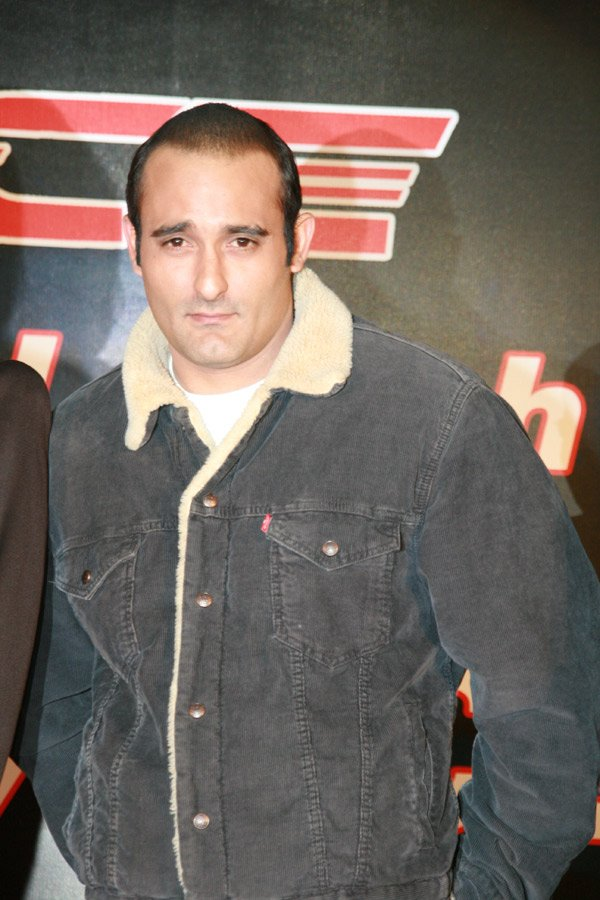
Khanna at Race promotional event

Akshaye Khanna is an Indian actor known for his work in Hindi films. Khanna made his debut in Himalay Putra (1997). His next release, J. P. Dutta's war drama Border (1997) emerged as a critical and commercial success, earning him the Filmfare Award for Best Male Debut.

Khanna had further commercial successes in the romantic drama Taal (1999), the comedy drama Dil Chahta Hai (2001) which won him the Filmfare Award for Best Supporting Actor, the romantic thriller Humraaz (2002), the comedies Hungama (2003) and Hulchul (2004), the murder mystery 36 China Town (2006), the action thriller Race (2008), and the heist comedy Tees Maar Khan (2010). He drew critical praise for his performances in the psychological thriller Deewangee (2002), the biographical drama Gandhi, My Father (2007) and the action thriller Aakrosh (2010).

Following a four-year hiatus in 2012, Khanna took on supporting roles in the action-comedy film Dishoom (2016) and as an investigative cop in two 2017 thrillers, Mom and Ittefaq. Khanna received renewed acclaim for portraying a defence lawyer in the legal drama Section 375 (2019), a cop in the crime thriller Drishyam 2 (2022), Mughal emperor Aurangzeb in the historical action Chhaava (2025) and gangster Rehman Dakait in spy action thriller Dhurandhar (2025), which is his highest-grossing film.

== Filmography ==
Key
†	Denotes films that have not yet been released

=== Films ===
Year	Title	Role	Notes	Ref.
1997	Himalay Putra	Abhay Khanna		
1997	Border	2nd Lt Dharamvir Singh Bhan		
1997	Mohabbat	Rohit Malhotra / Tony Braganza		
1997	Bhai Bhai	Dancer	Special appearance in the song "Tera Naam Loonga"	
1998	Doli Saja Ke Rakhna	Inderjit Bansal		
1998	Kudrat	Vijay		
1999	Aa Ab Laut Chalen	Rohan Khanna		
1999	Laawaris	Vijay / Captain Dada		
1999	Taal	Manav Mehta		
1999	Dahek	Sameer B. Roshan		
2001	Dil Chahta Hai	Siddharth "Sid" Sinha		
2002	Humraaz	Karan Malhotra		
2002	Deewangee	Raj Goyal		
2002	Bollywood/Hollywood	Himself	Special appearance	
2003	Hungama	Jitender "Jeetu" Sahai		
2003	LOC Kargil	Lt. Balwan Singh		
2003	Border Hindustan Ka	Mobarak	Cameo appearance	
2004	Deewaar	Gaurav Kaul		
2004	Hulchul	Jai A. Chand		
2006	Shaadi Se Pehle	Ashish Khanna		
2006	36 China Town	Chief Inspector Karan		
2006	Aap Ki Khatir	Aman Mehra		
2007	Salaam-e-Ishq	Shiven Dungarpur		
2007	Naqaab	Vikram "Vicky" Malhotra		
2007	Gandhi, My Father	Harilal Gandhi		
2007	Aaja Nachle	MP Raja Uday Singh		
2008	Race	Rajiv Singh		
2008	Mere Baap Pehle Aap	Gaurav J. Rane		
2009	Luck by Chance	Himself	Cameo appearance	
2009	Shortkut	Shekhar Giriraj		
2010	Aakrosh	Siddhant Chaturvedi		
2010	No Problem	Raj Ambani		
2010	Tees Maar Khan	Aatish Kapoor		
2012	Delhi Safari	Alex	Voiceover	
2012	Gali Gali Chor Hai	Bharat Narayan		
2016	Dishoom	Rahul "Wagah" Kabiraj		
2017	Mom	Matthew Francis		
2017	Ittefaq	Dev Verma		
2019	The Accidental Prime Minister	Sanjaya Baru		
2019	Section 375	Tarun Saluja		
2020	Sab Kushal Mangal	Baba Bhandari		
2021	State of Siege: Temple Attack	Major Hanut Singh	ZEE5 film; released in theatres under the title Akshardham: Operation Vajra Shakti	
2021	Hungama 2	Premnath Pannu	Cameo appearance	
2022	Love You Hamesha	Shaurat	Delayed release, filmed in 1999	
2022	Drishyam 2	IG Tarun Ahlawat IPS		
2025	Chhaava	Aurangzeb		
2025	Dhurandhar	Rehman Dakait		
2026	Border 2	2nd Lt Dharamvir Bhakhri	Cameo appearance	
2026	Dhurandhar: The Revenge	Rehman Dakait	Archival footage	
2026	Ikka	Shauryaman Gaur	Netflix film	
2027	Mahakāli †	Shukracharya	Telugu film; Filming	

== See also ==
- List of awards and nominations received by Akshaye Khanna
