= List of awards and nominations received by Akshaye Khanna =

Akshaye Khanna awards and nominations
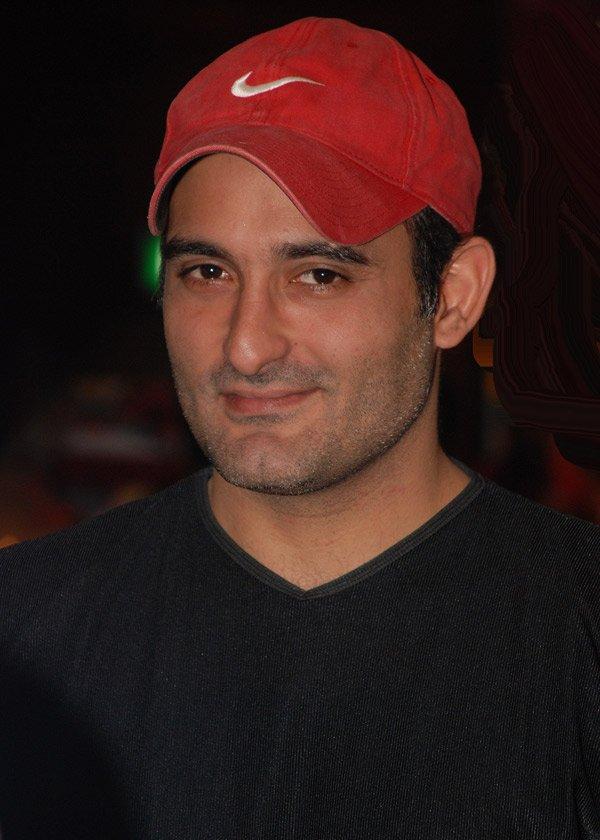
- Khanna at a film launch event in 2007
Awards and nominations
Award	Wins	Nominations

Totals (Note: Certain award groups do not simply award one winner. They acknowledge several different recipients, have runners-up, and have third place. Since this is a specific recognition and is different from losing an award, runner-up mentions are considered wins in this award tally. For simplification and to avoid errors, each award in this list has been presumed to have had a prior nomination.)
- Wins: 17
- Nominations: 36

This is a list of awards and nominations received by Akshaye Khanna. Khanna is an Indian actor who primarily works in Hindi films, and is a recipient of numerous accolades including two Filmfare Awards.

== Awards and nominations ==
Year	Award	Category	Work	Result	Ref.
1998	Sansui Viewers' Choice Movie Awards	Best Debut Actor	Himalay Putra	Won	
1998	Screen Awards	Most Promising Newcomer – Male	Himalay Putra & Border	Won	
1998	Screen Awards	Best Supporting Actor	Border	Nominated	
1998	43rd Filmfare Awards	Best Male Debut	Border	Won	
1998	43rd Filmfare Awards	Best Supporting Actor	Border	Nominated	
1998	Zee Cine Awards	Best Male Debut	Border	Won	
1998	Zee Cine Awards	Best Supporting Actor	Border	Won	
2002	47th Filmfare Awards	Best Supporting Actor	Dil Chahta Hai	Won	
2002	3rd IIFA Awards	Best Supporting Actor	Dil Chahta Hai	Nominated	
2002	Screen Awards	Best Supporting Actor	Dil Chahta Hai	Nominated	
2002	Screen Awards	Special Jury Award	Dil Chahta Hai	Won	
2002	Zee Cine Awards	Best Actor in a Supporting Role – Male	Dil Chahta Hai	Nominated	
2002	Bengal Film Journalists' Association Awards	Best Supporting Actor - Hindi	Dil Chahta Hai	Won	
2002	Sansui Viewers' Choice Movie Awards	Best Supporting Actor	Dil Chahta Hai	Won	
2003	48th Filmfare Awards	Best Performance in a Negative Role	Humraaz	Nominated	
2003	4th IIFA Awards	Best Villain	Humraaz	Won	
2003	Zee Cine Awards	Best Actor in a Negative Role	Humraaz	Nominated	
2003	Sansui Viewers' Choice Movie Awards	Best Actor in a Negative Role	Humraaz	Won	
2003	Screen Awards	Best Villain	Humraaz	Nominated	
2003	Screen Awards	Best Actor	Deewangee	Nominated	
2008	Screen Awards	Best Actor	Gandhi, My Father	Nominated	
2008	Producers Guild Film Awards	Best Actor in a Leading Role	Gandhi, My Father	Nominated	
2009	10th IIFA Awards	Best Villain	Race	Won	
2009	Screen Awards	Best Villain	Race	Won	
2011	Zee Cine Awards	Best Actor in a Supporting Role – Male	Tees Maar Khan	Nominated	
2011	Stardust Awards	Best Actor in a Comedy or Romance	Tees Maar Khan	Nominated	
2011	Stardust Awards	Star of the Year - Actor	Tees Maar Khan	Won	
2017	Zee Cine Awards	Best Actor in a Negative Role	Dishoom	Nominated	
2017	Stardust Awards	Best Actor in a Negative Role	Dishoom	Nominated	
2018	Zee Cine Awards	Best Actor in a Supporting Role – Male	Ittefaq	Nominated	
2020	65th Filmfare Awards	Best Actor – Critics	Section 375	Nominated	
2020	Screen Awards	Best Actor – Critics	Section 375	Nominated	
2022	Indian Television Academy Awards	Best Actor in an Original Film	State of Siege: Temple Attack	Nominated	
2026	Pinkvilla Screen and Style Icons Awards	Best Villain	Dhurandhar	Won	
2026	Screen Awards	Best Supporting Actor	Dhurandhar	Won	
2026	International Indian Film Academy Awards	Best Performance in a Negative Role	Dhurandhar	Won	

== See also ==
- Akshaye Khanna filmography
