= Karamchand =

- Written by: Pankaj Prakash: Anil Chaudhary
- Directed by: Pankaj Parashar
- Starring: See below
- Composer: Anand–Milind
- Country of origin: India
- Original language: Hindi
- No. of seasons: 2
- No. of episodes: 72

Production
- Running time: 25 minutes (season 1); 45 minutes (season 2)

Original release
- Network: DD National
- Release: June 1985 – 1988
- Network: Sony Entertainment Television
- Release: 10 February 2007 – 2007

Karamchand is an Indian detective-comedy television series that first aired in June 1985 on DD1 and was one of India's first detective series. The title character was played by Pankaj Kapur while the role of his assistant Kitty was played by Sushmita Mukherjee. The show was produced by Pankaj Parashar and Alyque Padamsee, and written by Sudhir Mishra. Music director duo Anand–Milind composed the theme music and title track for the series.

== Plot ==
The series revolves around Karamchand, a private detective who helps the local police solve murders and other crimes in his inimitable style. Unlike most other detective series, he does not rely on high-tech gadgets or forensics; instead, his approach consists of quirky deductions, sharp observation, and logic. He is always seen munching on carrots and often plays chess with Inspector Khan. He has a comedic assistant, Kitty, and whenever she asks a silly question or nearly reveals a secret, Karamchand says, "Shut up, Kitty." The exchange — Kitty declaring "Sir, you are a genius" and Karamchand replying "Shut up, Kitty" became one of the most quoted catchphrases in Indian television.

== Cast ==
=== Season 1 (1985) ===
- Pankaj Kapur as Karamchand
- Sushmita Mukherjee as Kitty
- Archana Puran Singh as various characters
- Deepak Qazir as Inspector Khan

=== Season 2 (2006) ===
- Pankaj Kapur as Karamchand
- Sucheta Khanna as Kitty
- Atul Parchure as Inspector Khan
- Rakesh Shrivastav as Constable Shrivastav
- Naseeruddin Shah as Mr. Roy (Guest)

== Production ==
=== Development and casting ===
The show was conceived by director Pankaj Parashar and produced in collaboration with theatre and advertising veteran Alyque Padamsee. It was written by Sudhir Mishra, who would later become a noted Hindi film director.

Pankaj Kapur was not the original choice for the title role. Actor Alok Nath played Karamchand in the pilot episode, which was created to pitch the show to Doordarshan. However, a falling out between Parashar and Nath led to Kapur's entry. Kapur, who had trained at the National School of Drama in Delhi, was initially reluctant to work in television but came on board seeing it as a means to achieve financial stability in Bombay. He was around 31 years old at the time.

=== Filming ===
The original series was filmed at Filmistan Studios in Bombay. Director Parashar kept production deliberately simple — using a single camera with no high-end gadgetry or computers, an approach that suited Kapur's own sensibility as a performer.

=== Initial reception and turnaround ===
The first few episodes were poorly received. Audiences found the unconventional style involving fast cuts, unusual camera angles, and an eccentric detective protagonist, difficult to accept. In an interview with Forbes India, Parashar recalled that Kapur had broken down during this period and questioned whether joining the show had been the right decision.

Audiences, however, soon warmed to the show. Prominent figures from the Hindi film industry offered their praise. As Parashar later recounted to Forbes India: "The likes of Dev Anand and Dilip Kumar appreciated our efforts. Manoj Kumar was very supportive, Kamal Haasan would call, and Kishore Kumar said he wanted to work with me. Saeed Mirza said you have created history." Parashar went on to direct the Bollywood films Jalwa (1987) and Chaalbaaz (1989).

== Cultural impact ==
The show quickly became a cultural phenomenon. Pankaj Kapur recalled in an interview with the Hindustan Times that merchandise inspired by the character — including "Karamchand halwa," carrots, and dark glasses bearing the character's name — sold widely during the show's run. Kapur later reflected that he had "experienced the popularity of a big star for those six months." The character's trademark dark sunglasses and carrot-munching became widely imitated, and carrot sales reportedly rose in a manner comparable to the effect the character Popeye had on spinach consumption among children.

The show aired during a pivotal era for Indian broadcasting. Doordarshan held a near-monopoly on Indian television until 1991, and the mid-1980s saw the rise of privately produced serialised fiction that attracted mass audiences and advertisers alike. Karamchand was part of a wave of landmark Doordarshan serials from this period that included Hum Log (1984–85) and Rajani (1985).

== Revival ==
Sony Entertainment Television revived the serial in 2007. Pankaj Kapur reprised his role as the carrot-chewing Karamchand while Kitty was played by Sucheta Khanna. However, the revival failed to match audience expectations. The second season was discontinued after only a few initial episodes and did not complete its planned run. Director Parashar, who no longer had tapes from the original season, drew on his memories of filming at Filmistan Studios to revive the show.

== In other media ==
In response to Leonard's detective novel, Rajesh Koothrapali mentioned Karamchand in Season 11, Episode 15 of The Big Bang Theory, the episode titled "The Novelization Correlation."
