= Rajkumar (1996 film) =

1996 film by Pankaj Parashar

- Directed by: Pankaj Parashar
- Written by: Vinay Shukla, Kamlesh Pandey
- Produced by: Tutu Sharma
- Starring: Naseeruddin Shah; Anil Kapoor; Madhuri Dixit; Danny Denzongpa; Reena Roy; Farida Jalal; Sanjai Mishra
- Cinematography: Kabir Lal
- Edited by: Afaque Hussain
- Music by: Laxmikant-Pyarelal
- Production company: Tutu films
- Release date: 22 March 1996
- Country: India
- Language: Hindi

Rajkumar (transl. Prince) is a 1996 Indian Hindi historical fantasy film directed by Pankaj Parashar. The film stars Anil Kapoor, Madhuri Dixit, Naseeruddin Shah and Sanjay Mishra. The film was a disaster at the box office.

== Plot ==
Rani Maa's husband is killed by the neighbouring kingdom's evil Prime Minister Man Singh. The Prime Minister absolves himself from this killing and blames it on the king, the father of Rajkumari Vishaka. Rani Maa swears to avenge the death of the Rajkumari. Man Singh also has a twin brother, Surjan Singh, who is not evil at all, albeit a little naive. Rani Maa is shocked and aghast when she finds out that her only son, Rajkumar, is in love with Rajkumari. She sets out to oppose this marriage, while Rajkumar will leave no stone unturned to marry Rajkumari. The stage is set for mother and son to decide whether it is in their best interest to include someone in the family who has killed a husband and a father, respectively.

== Cast ==
- Anil Kapoor as Rajkumar
- Madhuri Dixit as Rajkumari Vishaka
- Naseeruddin Shah as Man Singh/Surjan Singh
- Danny Denzongpa as Ali
- Saeed Jaffrey as Bhanuwala
- Reena Roy as Rani Maa
- Farida Jalal as Panna (Dai maa)
- Sanjay Mishra
- Vijayendra Ghatge
- Aruna Irani
- Arun Bali
- Pradeep Rawat

== Soundtrack ==
The soundtrack was composed by Laxmikant-Pyarelal, and the lyrics were penned by Anand Bakshi. "Payal Meri" is based on "Faith" by George Michael.

- "Payal Meri" [5:55] - Alka Yagnik, Udit Narayan
- "Yeh Khubsoorat Badan" [7:01] - Alka Yagnik
- "Aankhon Ke Aage Peeche" [7:40] - Kavita Krishnamurthy
- "Aaja Aaja Tu Aanewale" [6:30] - Iqbal Afzai, Sabri, Sukhwinder Singh, Jayshree Shivram
- "Bechain Hoon Main" [5:12] - Alka Yagnik, Udit Narayan
- "O Mere Rajkumar" [04:47] - Alka Yagnik
- "Tu Bijli Hai" [05:51] - Alka Yagnik, Udit Narayan

== Reception ==
India Today wrote, "The film meanders through witch lairs and palaces but accomplishes little. Madhuri Dixit's dances seem repetitive and even the director's occasional flashes of brilliance are not enough to prop up the threadbare script."
