= Swapnil =

Swapnil is a given name. Notable people with the name include:

- Swapnil Asnodkar (born 1984), Indian cricketer
- Swapnil Kotriwar (born 1988), Indian actor
