= Akshaye Khanna =

Indian actor (born 1975)

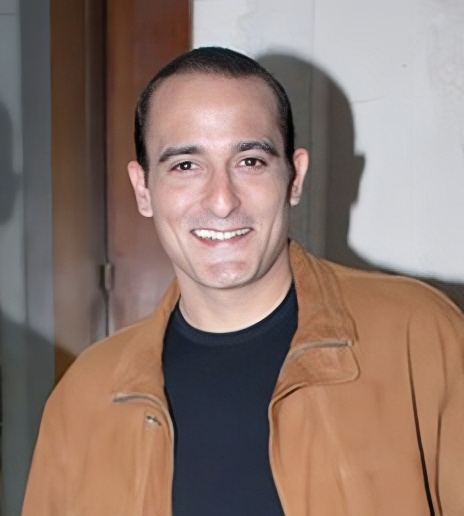
- Khanna in 2016
- Born: Akshaye Vinod Khanna; 28 March 1975 (age 51); Bombay (now Mumbai), Maharashtra, India
- Occupation: Actor
- Years active: 1997–present
- Works: Filmography
- Father: Vinod Khanna
- Relatives: Rahul Khanna (brother); A. F. S. Talyarkhan (maternal grandfather)
- Awards: Full list

Akshaye Khanna (born 28 March 1975) is an Indian actor who predominantly works in Hindi films. Known for his versatility, he is often regarded as one of the greatest actors in Indian cinema. Khanna is a recipient of numerous accolades, including two Filmfare Awards.

Born to actor Vinod Khanna, he made his acting debut with Himalay Putra (1997). His next release, J. P. Dutta's war drama Border (1997) emerged as a critical and commercial success, which earned him the Filmfare Award for Best Male Debut. Khanna replicated this success with the romance Taal (1999), the comedy-drama Dil Chahta Hai (2001) which won him the Filmfare Award for Best Supporting Actor, the comedies Hungama (2003) and Hulchul (2004), the murder mystery 36 China Town (2006) and the heist comedy Tees Maar Khan (2010). He drew critical praise for featuring in the thrillers Humraaz (2002) and Deewangee (2002), the biopic Gandhi, My Father (2007) and the action thrillers Race (2008) and Aakrosh (2010).

Following a four-year hiatus, Khanna returned to films with the action-comedy Dishoom (2016) and played an investigating officer in the 2017 thrillers Mom and Ittefaq, receiving further praise for playing a defence lawyer in the legal drama Section 375 (2019), a cop in the crime thriller Drishyam 2 (2022), and a spoilt son of a politician in Ikka (2026). He received widespread acclaim and achieved his biggest commercial successes portraying Aurangzeb in the historical action film Chhaava (2025) and Rehman Dakait in the Dhurandhar Duology.

== Early life and family ==
Akshaye Vinod Khanna was born on 28 March 1975 in Mumbai to actor and politician Vinod Khanna and his wife Geetanjali Talyarkhan. Khanna's father, a Punjabi Hindu, was an actor in Hindi cinema who died in 2017, while his mother was born into a Parsi family of lawyers and businessmen–she died in 2018. Actor Rahul Khanna is his elder brother and cricket commentator Bobby A. F. S. Talyarkhan was his maternal grandfather.

Khanna attended Bombay International School, Babulnath. He then did his 11th & 12th from Lawrence School, Lovedale, Ooty. In an interview, he said that he was better at sports than studies. He never married.

== Career ==
=== Breakthrough and early struggle (1997–2000) ===
Khanna made his acting debut with Pankaj Parashar's romantic drama Himalay Putra (1997), co-starring his father Vinod, Hema Malini, Satish Shah, Johny Lever, Danny Denzongpa, and Amrish Puri. His performance earned him a Screen Award for Best Male Debut, but the film underperformed at the box office despite mostly positive reviews.

Later that year, Khanna starred in J. P. Dutta's war drama Border alongside Sunny Deol, Suniel Shetty and Jackie Shroff. Set during the Indo-Pakistani war of 1971, the film was about the events of the Battle of Longewala and saw Khanna play the real-life role of Dharamvir Singh Bhan. The film generated positive reviews, becoming the second highest-grossing Bollywood film of 1997. Border won him the Filmfare Award for Best Male Debut in addition to his first nomination for Filmfare Award for Best Supporting Actor. News18 noted, "Akshay Khanna excels in a role that was not only multilayered but also asked him to show the mood transitions with facial gestures only."

Khanna's final release of 1997 was the romance Mohabbat, in which he starred alongside Madhuri Dixit. The film received negative critical reception and was commercially unsuccessful. The following year, Khanna starred opposite Jyothika in Priyadarshan's romantic drama Doli Saja Ke Rakhna (1998), in which he portrayed a rich person. Rediff.com stated, "Akshaye produces a good performance again. He's not a conventional looker but still appears charming." In the same year, Khanna starred opposite Urmila Matondkar in Raj N. Sippy's drama Kudrat.

Khanna's first release of 1999 came opposite Aishwarya Rai in Rishi Kapoor's directorial debut—the musical romance Aa Ab Laut Chalen. It was a below average in India but performed well at the overseas. His next film appearance was in Shrikant Sharma's romance Laawaris opposite Manisha Koirala. The film received positive reviews, but fared poorly at the box office. Khanna next starred opposite Aishwarya Rai in Subhash Ghai's musical romantic drama Taal, in which he played Manav Mehta. The film was highly anticipated by critics and proved to be the third highest-earning feature film of 1999, becoming his first commercial success since Border. Rediff.com wrote, "Akshaye is his usual self. Here he is endearing as a young and besotted lover who won't take no for an answer." Khanna's final film that year was Lateef Binnu's star-crossed romance Dahek in which he featured opposite Sonali Bendre as a Hindu boy who falls in love with a Muslim girl. The film proved to be a box office disappointment. Khanna had no film release in 2000.

=== Established actor (2001–2008) ===
Khanna returned to films in 2001 with Farhan Akhtar's coming-of-age comedy-drama Dil Chahta Hai, alongside Aamir Khan, Saif Ali Khan and Dimple Kapadia. Khanna featured as one of the three friends named Siddharth Sinha, a quiet and reticent boy. It generated highly positive reviews, with critical acclaim, and emerged as a major commercial success. Dil Chahta Hai won seven Filmfare Awards, including a Best Supporting Actor trophy for Khanna. Taran Adarsh noted, "Akshaye Khanna conveys a lot through his expressions and that's where he triumphs. An actor par excellence, he essays this complex character with flourish. Sita Menon from Rediff.com wrote, "With the character's depth, Akshaye uses his voice and expression to optimum effect. He's a surprise. A pleasant one."

Abbas–Mustan's romantic thriller Humraaz (2002), co-starring Ameesha Patel, was Khanna's next film release. He played the main antagonist Karan Malhotra, a convincing con-artist. It proved to be a major commercial success, and Khanna's performance drew critical praise. He won the IIFA Award for Best Performance in a Negative Role and earned nomination for Filmfare Award for Best Performance in a Negative Role. Idlebrain stated, "Akshaye Khanna excels in his villainous role." That year, he also starred as a lawyer in Anees Bazmee's thriller Deewangee alongside Urmila Matondkar, another successful film at the box-office for which Khanna was nominated for the Screen Award for Best Actor.

In 2003, Khanna starred as an electronic salesman in Priyadarshan's romantic comedy Hungama, co-starring Rimi Sen. The feature became a box office hit with earnings of ₹202 million (US$2.2 million) despite a mixed critical reception. He next reunited with J. P. Dutta to film LOC: Kargil, a war drama based on the events of the Kargil War fought between India and Pakistan. Khanna played the real-life character of Balwan Singh, an Indian army officer who is a part of the war alongside Preeti Jhangiani.

Khanna's first release of 2004 was Milan Luthria's action thriller Deewaar, in which he played Gaurav Kaul, the son of an Indian army officer who sets out to find his missing father. Co-starring Amitabh Bachchan and Amrita Rao, it received critical acclaim but failed to fare well at the box office. In the same year, Khanna reteamed with Priyadarshan in the romantic comedy Hulchul, in which he was paired opposite Kareena Kapoor. The film proved to be a box-office hit. India Today wrote, "Khanna, one of the most underrated actors in Bollywood, keep the film moving with bang-on performances."

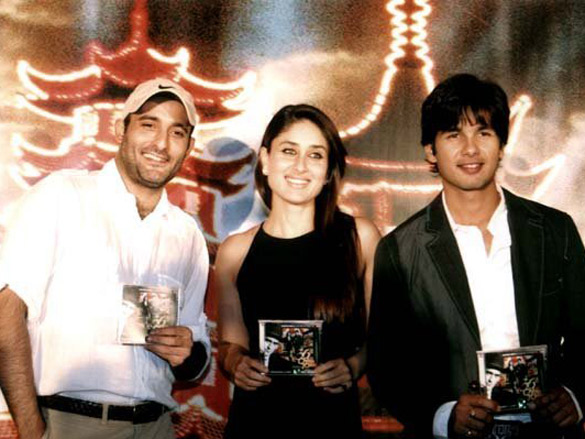
Khanna pictured with Kareena Kapoor and Shahid Kapoor at the audio release of 36 China Town in 2006

After an absence in 2005, Khanna appeared in three films in 2006 — the first of which was Satish Kaushik's comedy-drama Shaadi Se Pehle, co-starring Ayesha Takia and Mallika Sherawat. Khanna's next role was in 36 China Town, a murder-mystery comedy co-starring Kareena Kapoor and Shahid Kapoor. The film featured him as a police officer, and proved to be a financial success with earnings of over ₹369 million (US$3.9 million) worldwide. Khanna's final film release that year was Dharmesh Darshan's romantic comedy Aap Ki Khatir alongside Priyanka Chopra. It proved to be one of the year's biggest flops.

In 2007, Khanna acted in Nikkhil Advani's ensemble drama Salaam-e-Ishq: A Tribute to Love, a romantic comedy, where he was featured opposite Ayesha Takia. The film received mixed reviews from critics and emerged as a major commercial disappointment. Rajeev Masand noted, "Akshaye Khanna as the groom-to-be who gets cold feet at the eleventh hour delivers a commendable performance." His next was Abbas–Mustan's love-saga Naqaab, in which he starred alongside Urvashi Sharma. The feature received positive reviews from audiences but turned out to be an average grosser. Khanna then took a leading role in Feroz Abbas Khan's Gandhi, My Father. The feature explores the relationship between Mahatma Gandhi and his eldest son Harilal Gandhi. The film underperformed at the box office, but was positively received by critics. Hindustan Times noted, "Khanna is absolutely inspired and gives the complex part all his conviction and intelligence. His breakdown scenes are especially heart-wrenching." In his final release of that year, Khanna teamed with Anil Mehta for the dance film Aaja Nachle, co-starring Madhuri Dixit, which underperformed at the box office.

Khanna's performance in the Abbas–Mustan-directed the 2008 action thriller Race, marked a turning point in his career. He starred alongside Katrina Kaif and Bipasha Basu. He played the main antagonist Rajiv Singh, an alcoholic person. The film became one of the highest-grossing films of that year with over ₹1 billion (US$11 million), becoming Khanna's highest-grossing release to that point, and earned him Best Performance in a Negative Role awards at IIFA and Screen. Bollywood Hungama noted, "Akshaye is so perfect. To carry off a difficult character like this is a Herculean task and the supremely talented actor handles it with aplomb." Rajeev Masand wrote, "Akshaye Khanna delivers an amateurish performance by hamming through his scenes." He then reunited with Priyadarshan in the comedy Mere Baap Pehle Aap, co-starring Paresh Rawal and Genelia D'Souza.

=== Limited success and sabbatical (2009–2012) ===
Khanna's only film release in 2009 was Neeraj Vora's romantic comedy Shortkut, in which he appeared opposite Amrita Rao, portraying an assistant director named Shekhar. In 2010, he appeared in three films that failed to achieve significant commercial or critical success. The first was Priyadarshan's action thriller Aakrosh, in which he played a Central Bureau of Investigation officer. This was followed by Anees Bazmee's comedy No Problem, co-starring Kangana Ranaut.

Later that year, Khanna appeared in the slapstick comedy Tees Maar Khan, co-starring Akshay Kumar and Katrina Kaif, in which he portrayed a successful but self-serving film actor. The film was classified as a semi-hit at the box office. A review published by Rediff.com commented on his performance positively, noting his controlled portrayal of the character.

In 2012, Khanna starred in the ensemble romantic comedy Gali Gali Chor Hai, directed by Rumi Jaffrey and co-starring Shriya Saran and Mugdha Godse. The film received mixed to negative reviews and performed poorly at the box office.

Following this period, Khanna took a hiatus from film acting that lasted several years. In later interviews, he stated that his absence from acting had a negative impact on his mental health, describing the period as personally difficult due to his long-standing association with performance work.

=== Resurgence (2016–2024) ===
Khanna made his return to films in 2016 with the action cop comedy Dishoom, playing the role of the main antagonist Wagah, a bookie who targets a top batsman. The feature received mixed reviews from critics, but emerged successful, earning over ₹1.20 billion (US$13 million) worldwide. Anna M. M. Vetticad wrote, "Akshaye Khanna manages to lend notable touches to his part, but remains a victim of an under-written role."

Ravi Udayawar's crime thriller Mom was Khanna's first release of 2017, co-starring with Sridevi, he received critical appreciation for his performance as Matthew, a CBI officer. With a global revenue of over ₹1.75 billion (US$19 million), it emerged as a financial success. Kunal Guha from Mumbai Mirror wrote, "Akshaye Khanna as the intuitive crime branch inspector sticks to his lopsided expressions and is unobjectionable." Later that year, he starred as an investigative cop in Abhay Chopra's murder-mystery Ittefaq. Co-starring Sonakshi Sinha and Sidharth Malhotra, it proved to be an average grosser. Samrudhi Ghosh of India Today noted, "Akshaye Khanna is the star of the film. Whether it's his no-nonsense demeanour or smart-aleck one-liners, Akshaye is a delight to watch on screen."

Khanna had two films in 2019. He played Sanjay Baru, Indian policy analyst in The Accidental Prime Minister. It was a moderate success. Ronak Kotecha of The Times of India stated, "Khanna ensures there's never a dull moment. Often talking directly into the camera, Khanna is quick to strike a chord with the audience, also playing the narrator." He next starred as the defence lawyer in Section 375 alongside Richa Chadda. His performance gained him a nomination for Filmfare Critics Award for Best Actor. The film was declared average at the box office. Rajeev Masand noted, "Akshaye Khanna brings a wily charm to his role as the defence lawyer. The film gives him some of the best lines and the grandstanding moments, and he makes a meal of it." Monika Rawal Kukreja states, "Khanna impresses with his intense and gritty performance in every frame, though he could have worked a bit more on his flat facial expressions."

His only release in 2020, was Sab Kushal Mangal. Nandini Ramnath from Scroll.in wrote, "Khanna's Babu enlivens the movie whenever he appears, which isn't as often as it needed to be, and his absence is sorely felt." In 2021, Khanna, played NSG officer in State of Siege: Temple Attack. Saibal Chatterjee noted, "Akshaye Khanna is doubtless a talented actor. One sees flashes of his class all through the film. But he is trapped in a script that has little room for vivid character development." The film had a theatrical release in 2025, under the title title Akshardham: Operation Vajra Shakti.

Khanna's much delayed film Love You Hamesha, became his first film of 2022, co-starring Sonali Bendre. He then played a police officer in Drishyam 2. The film emerged as a critical and commercial success with Khanna receiving praise for his performance in the film. A critic from Bollywood Hungama noted, "Akshaye Khanna is a great addition to the franchise. He is a scene-stealer thanks to his characterization and performance." While, Sonil Dedhia of News18 wrote, "Akshaye Khanna is at his usual best. He shines in every scene and leaves behind a big impression. Khanna as usual is the scene stealer."

=== Further acclaim (2025–present) ===
Following another two-year hiatus, Khanna portrayed Mughal emperor Aurangzeb in his first release of 2025, Chhaava, based on the life of Chhatrapati Sambhaji Maharaj, starring Vicky Kaushal. To enhance the intensity of their on-screen rivalry, Khanna and Kaushal avoided interacting with each other during filming. Hindustan Times's Rishab Suri termed his performance "menacing" and was appreciative of his expressive eyes. A box office success, it emerged as one of the highest-grossing Indian films of all time.

In his other release of 2025, Khanna portrayed a Pakistani gangster Rehman Dakait in Dhurandhar, inspired by the geopolitical conflicts, and covert operations of India's Research and Analysis Wing (R&AW) with local gangs and crime syndicates in the Lyari area of Karachi, Pakistan. Anuj Kumar of The Hindu felt Akshaye "steals the thunder" with "[his] chilling presence and a piercing gaze that fills you with the fear of the devil". A spontaneous dance sequence performed by Khanna in his entry scene (set to the song "Fa9la") went viral on social media. The film achieved significant box-office success, grossing over ₹1,000 crore and became the fifth-highest-grossing Indian film. This success led several critics to declare the year as "Khanna's year."

He next starred in the Netflix original legal drama Ikka alongside Sunny Deol. While Tanisha Bhattacharya of NDTV praised Khanna's ability to evoke audience animosity alongside vulnerable moments shared with Dia Mirza, Renuka Vyavahare of The Times of India found his performance repetitive, noting its similarity to his earlier portrayal of Rehman Dakait. Despite mixed reception, the film achieved the third-largest opening for a Netflix original in India in 2026. Debuting at number one, it accumulated 10.1 million hours watched and ranked second on the global films chart.

== Public image and artistry ==
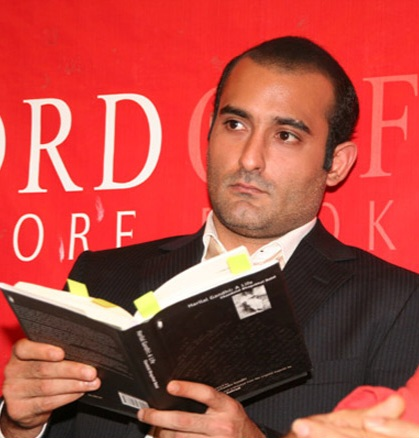
Khanna at the script reading session of Gandhi, My Father

Khanna is regarded as one of the finest actors of his generation. Rajeev Masand termed Khanna to be "one of Bollywood's most reclusive actors". Komal Panchal of The Indian Express termed him the "most nuanced, subtle actor" and noted, "Akshaye is someone who doesn't force himself onto his characters, but becomes one with every character he portrays on-screen." Rohini Iyer of Rediff.com stated, "Akshaye has the knack of coming up with one powerhouse performance after another." Khaleej Times's Khalid Mohamed noted, "From being a reluctant actor to being more forthcoming - the formidably talented Akshaye Khanna has turned the wheel." Roshmila Bhattacharya of Mumbai Mirror praised the actor for being "very punctual". V S Srinivasan of Rediff.com termed Khanna as the "star of the future", after his film Border's release.

Critics noted that the film Dil Chahta Hai marked a major turning point for Khanna. Sneha Bengani of Firstpost termed his role to be "written and performed with much care and control". She added that the role would have been different "without Akshaye Khanna's able performance". Aakriti Anand of Filmfare feels that his "performance in the film is the one that put him on the map." Following his portrayal of a variety of characters in Humraaz, Deewangee (both 2002), Hungama (2003), Gandhi, My Father (2007), Race (2008) and Drishyam 2 (2022), Khanna was noted for his versatility. In an interview with Nirtika Pandita of The Asian Age, Khanna termed himself to be "a director's actor". He further added that he likes to keep "his life private and stays away from social life". The New Indian Express named Khanna's performance in Drishyam 2 among the best of the year 2022.

Members of the Indian film industry have often praised Khanna. Shah Rukh Khan said, "I've always been extremely fond of Akshaye and his acting abilities. I'm a big fan of his work. There's a strange mystique about him that reflects in his acting." Kareena Kapoor admitted to have a "huge crush" on the actor. His Section 375 co-star Richa Chadda termed him an "underrated actor" and said, "I have admired Akshaye Khanna's work in offbeat films like Gandhi, My Father and the cult film Dil Chahta Hai. I am really delighted that I can team up with him. He is brilliant, so underrated and intelligent." Khanna has participated in several concert tours. His first concert tour, "Magnificent Five", was in 1999 in which he performed alongside actors Aamir Khan, Aishwarya Rai, Rani Mukerji and Twinkle Khanna. In 2006, he provided voice-over in the unplugged version of the title song of his film Aap Ki Khatir.

Khanna is known for avoiding media attention and extensive public relations, which has led to him being described as a mysterious figure. The actor has openly spoken about his preference for solitude, stating that his alone time is "sacrosanct". He has also expressed being commitment phobic and "not marriage material," citing his reluctance to compromise his independent lifestyle. At a promotional event for the film Ittefaq, Karan Johar remarked that Khanna possesses a "scary voice" due to its flat, toneless quality. During the same event, Shah Rukh Khan jokingly referred to Khanna as "strange," sharing an anecdote about meeting him backstage. Khan recalled that after brief small talk, he declined a staff member's request to further interact with the actor, knowing that Khanna is notoriously quiet. During an interview with Anurradha Prasad, when questioned about his stardom, Khanna expressed gratitude for his 15-year career, noting that very few actors have the opportunity to work so consistently in the industry. He compared film stardom to the business world, questioning whether a businessman with a net worth of ₹500 crore should be considered unsuccessful simply because he isn't as wealthy as Ratan Tata or Dhirubhai Ambani. He concluded by stating that he is content with his current standing.

== Awards and nominations ==
Khanna is a recipient of two Filmfare Awards — Best Male Debut for Border and Best Supporting Actor for Dil Chahta Hai.

== See also ==
- List of Indian film actors
- List of Hindi film actors
