= Court Martial (2020 film) =

2020 Indian television drama film directed by Sourabh Srivastava

- Film poster
- Directed by: Sourabh Srivastava
- Written by: Swadesh Deepak
- Starring: Rajeev Khandelwal; Saksham Dayma; Swapnil Kotriwar
- Production company: Zee Theatre
- Distributed by: ZEE5
- Release date: 6 May 2020
- Running time: 96 minutes
- Country: India
- Language: Hindi

Court Martial is a 2020 Indian Hindi-language web drama film directed by Sourabh Srivastava. The film stars Rajeev Khandelwal, Saksham Dayma and Swapnil Kotriwar in the main lead roles. The film script was based on the teleplay written by Swadesh Deepak in the 1980s. The film follows the role of Bikash Roy who is an extremely sharp minded defensive lawyer goes into deep ideology to bring the shocking revelation and truth behind the brutal assault of a senior army officer by a junior ranked army personnel. The film is set on the backdrop of military court. The film was released on ZEE5 on 6 May 2020.

== Plot ==
Sawar Ramchander is being court martialed for killing his senior officer and injuring another officer, Captain B. D. Kapoor. The story is about the truth of why Ramchander did this, and defence lawyer Captain Bikash Roy proves it slowly and steadily.

Captain Kapoor belongs to an upper caste while Ramchander belongs to a lower class. All army complaints from ordinary soldiers to the commanding officer is done to a subedar, who passes on the complaint. In this case, Subedar Balwaan Singh knew that Captain Kapoor used to call Ramchander filthy names and dishonor him with being the servant of Mr. Kapoor's house. On the day the killing, Ramchander is insulted again, being told "your mother must be sleeping with a high class person". He lost his temper and the incident happened. In between the hearing at the court Captain Kapoor has many times lost control and has shown a lot of hatred towards the guard at the duty, who he thinks is inferior to him. Also, while being questioned by Roy, he raises his hand to hit him and Kapoor's wife has called him an animal/beast, as he has beaten her up. Captain Kapoor loses control once again and gets into a scuffle with the guard on duty; during the scuffle Kapoor is shot in the chest.

== Cast ==
- Rajeev Khandelwal as Defence Lawyer Captain Bikash Roy
- Saksham Dayma as Captain B. D. Kapoor aka Bhikari Das Kapoor
- Govind Pandey as Col. Suraj Singh, Chief of Judges for this Court Martial
- Swapnil Kotriwar as Sawar Ramchander
- Bhagwan Tiwari as Prosecution Lawyer Major Ajay Puri
- Navin Tyagi as Lt Col Rajendra Rawat, Commanding Officer
- Saroj Parida as Capt Dr. Gupta
- Ram Ashish Mishra as Subedar Balwaan Singh
