= Rakta Charitra 2 =

2010 film directed by Ram Gopal Varma

- Theatrical release poster in Telugu
- Directed by: Ram Gopal Varma
- Written by: Prashant Pandey
- Produced by: Madhu Mantena; Chinna Vasudeva Reddy; Sheetal Vinod Talwar
- Starring: Vivek Oberoi; Suriya; Sudeep; Shatrughan Sinha; Priyamani; Radhika Apte
- Narrated by: Chetan Sashital (Hindi) Ram Gopal Varma (Telugu)
- Cinematography: Amol Rathod
- Edited by: Nipun Ashok Gupta
- Music by: Dharam–Sandeep; Imran–Vikram; Sukhwinder Singh
- Production companies: RGV Film factory Cinergy
- Release date: 3 December 2010
- Running time: 111-116 minutes
- Country: India
- Languages: Telugu; Hindi

Rakta Charitra 2 (transl. History of Blood 2) is a 2010 Indian biographical political action thriller film directed by Ram Gopal Varma and written by Prashant Pandey. Based on the life of Paritala Ravindra, the film is a direct sequel to Rakta Charitra which released two months earlier. The film features an ensemble cast of Vivek Oberoi, Suriya, Sudeep, Shatrughan Sinha, Priyamani, Radhika Apte, Zarina Wahab, Sushmita Mukherjee, Ajaz Khan, Tanikella Bharani and Subhalekha Sudhakar.

Shot simultaneously in Telugu and Hindi, with the latter titled Rakht Charitra 2, the film was released on 3 December 2010 and received mixed-to-positive reviews from critics, with lukewarm comparisons with the original film as well as the repetitive narrative being the common points of criticism. Despite emerging as a flop during its theatrical run, the film has gained cult status and is regarded as one of Varma's best works with Suriya receiving praise for his memorable debut in both Hindi and Telugu industries through this film. The two-part epic was later dubbed and released in Tamil as Raththa Sarithiram in March 2011, with the entire first part being condensed into an half-an-hour prologue and some scenes rearranged.

== Plot ==
The film opens with a recap recounting how Pratap Ravi (Vivek Oberoi) avenged the brutal murders of his father Veerbhadra and brother Shankar, obliterating his rivals before rising to political power as a minister with the patronage of Chief Minister Shivaji Rao (Shatrughan Sinha).

In the present, an ambush unfolds on a secluded roadway fringed by dense woodland. A vengeful operative lies in wait alongside his armed unit for Pratap’s high-security motorcade and hurls a devastating bomb straight at the convoy. The resulting blast tears through the vehicles, killing scores of Pratap's escorts. Pratap miraculously survives with catastrophic injuries. Pratap’s remaining security detail retaliates violently, gunning down several ambushers, but the ringleader and his surviving comrades slip away into the wilderness.

Convalescing in hospital, a heavily bandaged Pratap lapses into severe paranoia, kicking himself for having shown mercy to Puru Reddy (Vishwajeet Pradhan). Concurrently, DCP Mohan Prasad (Sudeep), tasked with cracking the assassination plot, detains Puru and subjects him to a cold, ruthless interrogation. Broken, Puru confesses the mastermind's identity: Suryabhan "Surya" Reddy (Suriya), the estranged eldest son of late MLA Narsimha Deva Reddy (Raja Krishnamoorthy). Surya has emerged from the shadows to avenge not only his father's demise, but the slaughter of his entire household, who were wiped out by a television bomb during Pratap’s bloody election purge. When confronted by press reporters over the television blast, Pratap flatly denies culpability. Surya meets his wife Bhavani (Priyamani), bitterly lamenting that his strike missed its mark.

When Prasad interrogates Pratap at his estate, an icy hostility flares between the cynical policeman and the vengeful minister. Refusing to wait, Pratap mobilizes his clandestine death squads, ordering a district-wide liquidation of Surya’s associates. Their first victim is Puru, who is cornered and pumped full of lead as retribution for concealing Surya's vendetta. With dead bodies mounting across the district, Prasad raids Bhavani's hideout as she attempts to flee with her infant child, Arya. Prasad delivers an ultimatum to Surya: surrender immediately or face severe harm coming to his wife and child. Realizing that a second ambush is impossible amidst the lockdown and that voluntary custody offers strategic protection to regroup, Surya surrenders after verifying Bhavani's safety.

Terrified by Surya's tenacity, Pratap pleads with Shivaji to authorize an extrajudicial execution, but the seasoned Chief Minister refuses to jeopardize his government's stability and orders absolute neutrality. Defying his mentor, Pratap enlists Murari, an untraceable contract killer, to assassinate Surya inside the courtroom. Disguised as an elderly woman, Murari lunges at Surya during a hearing, but the attempt botches, inciting pandemonium. Despite being bound in handcuffs, Surya overpowers Murari and brutally decapitates him right before the petrified judge before Prasad and armed marshals pin him down. The bloody spectacle lands Surya in high-security central prison. Acting on advice from his lieutenant AK (Subrat Dutta), Pratap coordinates with the Jailor (Ragesh Asthana) to bribe seasoned inmates to lynch Surya behind bars.

Incarcerated, Surya earns the awe of an influential inmate, Bhondu (Ajaz Khan), who is captivated by his fearless demeanor. Surya confides his past, initiating an extensive flashback:

Disillusioned by Anantapur’s ceaseless factional warfare, Surya had detached himself from his father's syndicate, establishing a legitimate construction enterprise in Bangalore. He was celebrating a lucrative contract and bantering with his then-fiancée Bhavani about their nuptials when news arrived that Pratap had hacked Narsimha to death. Rushing home, Surya had confronted his volatile younger brother, Chandrabhan "Chandu" Reddy (Swapnil Kotriwar), who was desperate to slaughter Pratap. Discovering that their late father's fortune had been seized by Nagmani Reddy (Kota Srinivasa Rao), Surya confronted Nagmani to demand their inheritance. Nagmani arrogantly dismissed him, falsely alleging unpaid business debts. Resisting Chandu’s demands for bloodshed, Surya urged patience to shield his mother Gomthi (Sushmita Mukherjee) and his sister (Ruchi) from reprisals. On the day Bhavani agreed to marry Surya and relocate permanently to Bangalore, Pratap gunned down Nagmani. When Pratap entered electoral politics and his hit squads commenced systematic purges, Surya attempted to counter the onslaught through legal petitions, to no avail. During a festive family gathering, Surya and Bhavani visited Narsimha's ancestral home just after Pratap's strike team delivered an ostensibly gifted television set. The moment Chandu switched on the appliance, the hidden explosive detonated, incinerating the residence and instantaneously slaughtering Chandu, Gomthi, Surya's sister, and visiting guests. Surya and Bhavani survived with severe trauma and shrapnel wounds. Confronted by the blackened, mutilated remains of his loved ones, Surya abandoned all civilian ambitions, swearing to butcher Pratap.

Moved to tears by the tragedy, Bhondu pledges absolute loyalty to assist Surya’s vendetta.

Meanwhile, a remorseful Pratap berates AK and Omkar (Anupam Shyam) for disobeying his core mandate by bombing the residence and slaughtering women and children instead of isolating Chandu. Shortly thereafter, the hitmen inside the prison strike while Surya is bathing, but Surya turns into a whirlwind of violence, brutally massacring every assailant in the bathhouse. A humiliated Pratap faces harsh censure from Shivaji, who orders him to halt the factional bloodshed. Realizing the conflict is spiraling out of control, Pratap visits the prison to negotiate directly. Standing outside the iron bars, Pratap coldly urges Surya to call a truce, arguing that mutual destruction yields nothing. Surya unblinkingly retorts that the bloodshed will end only once Pratap is dead. Pratap departs, confident that stone walls render his rival powerless.

Seeking to wrest control of Anantapur, political strategist Swami (Subhalekha Sudhakar), a key ally of opposition heavyweight Naidu Sir ji, visits Surya in prison. Swami argues that to defeat Pratap, Surya must build an overwhelming political profile and persuades Surya to field Bhavani as an opposition candidate in the upcoming assembly elections. Recognizing that Bhavani’s electoral victory will destroy his empire, Pratap instructs AK and Omkar to execute her on the campaign trail. However, Pratap’s pregnant wife, Nandini (Radhika Apte), defies her husband for the first time, tearfully imploring him not to murder an innocent mother. Shaken, Pratap calls AK to abort the hit. The order comes seconds too late: Bhondu, newly released on bail and monitoring Bhavani under Surya's directives, intercepts the assassins and guns down Omkar, escorting Bhavani to safety.

A triumphant Swami visits Surya to express gratitude for shifting Anantapur's political tide. An incandescent Surya, learning of the botched attempt on Bhavani's life, demands that Swami facilitate his ultimate request in return: orchestrating Pratap's assassination.

Sensing his grip slipping, an increasingly cornered Pratap convenes a high-profile conclave of state politicians and regional leaders. Surya devises an infiltration plan: knowing every visiting minister will arrive flanked by personal commandos, he instructs Bhondu and his cohorts to don standard bodyguard uniforms, exploiting the security crowd to move undetected. As the summit concludes, Pratap walks toward his escort. Through the moving throng, he suddenly comes face-to-face with a lone figure in civilian clothes and freezes in terror—it is Surya, smuggled out of custody. Surya raises his weapon and relentlessly pumps bullets into Pratap’s body, leaving him bleeding out on the stone pavement. Surya’s men immediately deploy tear gas canisters; amidst the blinding fumes and ensuing stampede, Surya slips away and surreptitiously re-enters his prison cell before roll call. A devastated Nandini arrives to mourn her husband's corpse alongside Harita (Pragathi) and surviving loyalists.

Bhondu, intercepted at the perimeter, willingly claims sole responsibility for the assassination. Swami celebrates the outcome, having acquired a disposable scapegoat while keeping Surya and Bhavani indebted to his political machinery.

In the aftermath, DCP Mohan Prasad visits Surya in his cell. Prasad acknowledges Surya's iron will, yet somberly reflects on the cyclical curse of the region. He observes that Pratap himself was forged into a monster entirely by circumstances, noting the bitter irony that Pratap may not even have ordered the television bombing that triggered Surya's rage. Prasad warns that Pratap had gradually transformed into the very tyrants he once hunted down—and that if conditions persist, Surya will inevitably become another Pratap. Surya stands unmoved, declaring with cold conviction that Pratap was indeed the architect of his family's ruin, and that he will never mirror his dead rival.

The tragedy closes on Nari (Zarina Wahab) praying silently before family portraits of her butchered husband and two sons, while a widowed Nandini cradles her newborn infant, surrounded by the haunting silence of Anantapur.

== Cast ==
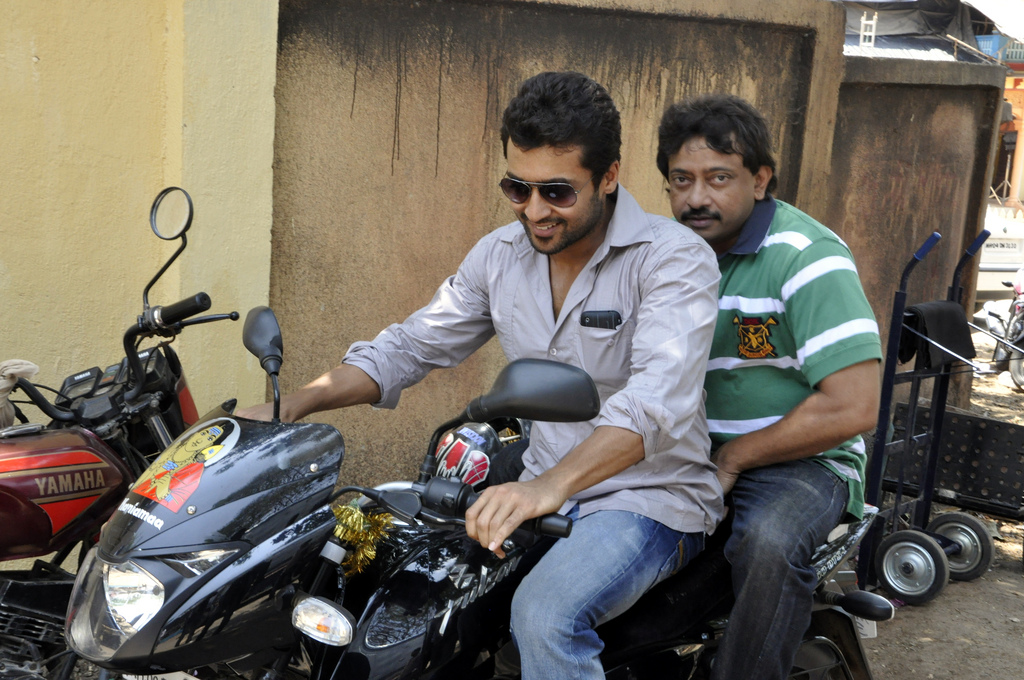
Suriya with Ram Gopal Varma on the set of Rakta Charitra 2

- Vivek Oberoi as Pratap Ravi (Based on Paritala Ravindra)
- Suriya as Suryabhan "Surya" Reddy (Based on Gangula Suryanarayana Reddy alias Maddelacheruvu Suri)
- Sudeep as DCP Mohan Prasad
- Shatrughan Sinha as Chief Minister Shivaji Rao (Based on Nandamuri Taraka Rama Rao)
- Priyamani as Bhavani (Based on Gangula Bhanumati Reddy)
- Radhika Apte as Nandini (Based on Paritala Sunitha)
- Zarina Wahab as Nari (Based on Paritala Narayanamma)
- Sushmita Mukherjee as Gomthi
- Tanikella Bharani as Ram Moorthy
- Subrat Dutta as AK
- Ajaz Khan as Bhondu
- Vishwajeet Pradhan as Puru Reddy
- Anupam Shyam as Omkar
- Subhalekha Sudhakar as Swami
- Pragathi as Harita
- Ragesh Asthana as Jailor
- Ruchi as Surya's sister
- Swapnil Kotriwar as Chandrabhan
- Raja Krishnamoorthy as Narsimha Deva Reddy (cameo appearance)
- Kota Srinivasa Rao as Nagmani Reddy (cameo appearance)
- Abhimanyu Singh as Bukka Reddy (cameo appearance)

== Soundtrack ==
Rakta Charitra 2

Soundtrack album by Imran-Vikram, Dharam-Sandeep, Sukhwinder Singh, and Amar Desai
- Released: 11 November 2010
- Recorded: 2010
- Genre: Film soundtrack
- Length: 23:11
- Label: T-Series

Hindi tracklist
No.	Title	Lyrics	Music	Singer(s)	Length
1.	"Patthar Ko"	Sandeep Singh	Sukhwinder Singh	Sukhwinder Singh	3:09
2.	"Khel Shuroo"	Vayu	Dharam-Sandeep	Armaan Malik, Shreekumar Vakkiyil	4:03
3.	"Nagendra Haraya"	Prashant Pandey	Sukhwinder Singh	Sukhwinder Singh, Viveka	4:02
4.	"Maar De" (Remix)	Shabeer Ahmed	Imran-Vikram	Jojo	6:04
5.	"Mila Toh" (Electro Mix)	Shyamraj Dutta	Dharam-Sandeep	Sandeep Patil, Ravindra Upadhay, Vishvesh Parmar	3:48
6.	"Patthar Ko" (Theme Music)		Sukhwinder Singh	Instrumental	2:05
Total length:					23:11

Tamil tracklist
No.	Title	Singer(s)	Length
1.	"Sathathin Soodhattam"	Tippu	4:29
2.	"Thuninju Vettiven"	Abishek Nailwal	3:42
3.	"Manidham Yendra"	Ravi	4:20
4.	"Kollada"	Tippu	5:48
5.	"Kathigalin"	Krishnaraj	4:17
6.	"Karma Dharma"	Vardhan, Aditi Paul	3:08
7.	"Aattam Arrambam"	Armaan Malik, Sreekumar	3:33
8.	"Nagendra Haraya"	Manikka Vinayagam	4:00
9.	"Thottale Unnai"	Manikka Vinayagam	2:09
10.	"Kollada" (Remix)	Tippu	6:02
11.	"Thuninju Vettuven" (Remix)	Tippu	6:02
Total length:			46:10

== Reception ==
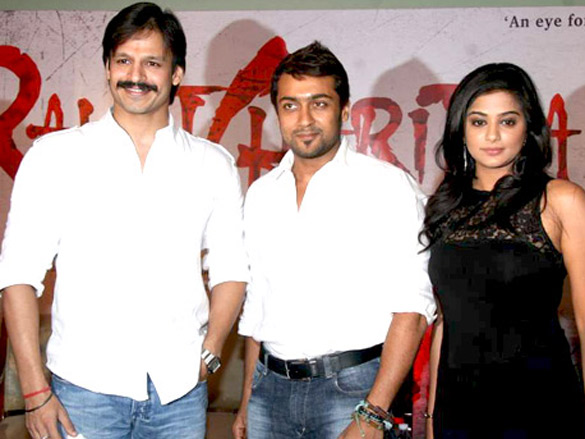
From left to right: Vivek Oberoi, Suriya, and Priyamani during the press meet of Rakta Charitra 2.

Taran Adarsh of Bollywood Hungama gave 3.5 out of 5, praising the film as a powerful, fast-paced, and intensely violent sequel directed by Ram Gopal Varma. Renuka Rao of DNA India gave 3 stars in a scale of 5, concluding that "Watch it if you had watched the first part, but don't be surprised if you don't like this as much". Nikhat Kazmi of Times of India gave 3 stars out of 5, stating that "Rakht Charitra doesn't break new ground like Satya and Company, nevertheless it remains a must-see film for Ramu fans." Shubhra Gupta of Indian Express gave 2.5 stars out of 5, and wrote that "Like in the first part, RGV's intention is not so much to delve into the complexities of Andhra politics, which stay firmly in the backdrop, but to create sequences where death is choreographed in varying ways. After a point, you are oblivious to the gore. But you cannot, at any point, bypass Suriya : he has eyes that speak. Bollywood is ready for him".

NDTV gave 2 out of 5 stars writing "Suriya saves the film from being a total loss. His expressive eyes have a quiet strength and his presence sears the screen". The Economic Times gave 3 out of 5 stars stating "The sequel carries forward the tale of power and revenge which exploded in Rakht Charitra 1". Rediff gave 1.5 out of 5 stars stating "RGV doesn't have anything new to offer in Rakht Charitra 2. The film does have some high points but they are too few to keep you engaged".

== Accolades ==
Year	Award	Category	Recipient	Notes
2011	Screen Awards	Screen Award for Most Promising Newcomer – Male	Suriya	
2011	Stardust Awards	Stardust Award for Superstar of Tomorrow – Male	Suriya	
