= Urvashi Sharma =

Indian actress

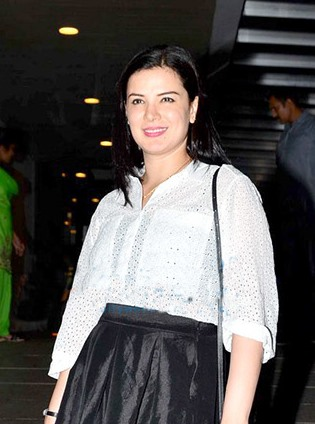
- Urvashi Sharma in 2016
- Born: Urvashi Sharma; 13 july, 1984; Delhi, India
- Other name: Raina Joshi
- Occupations: Film and TV Actress, Model
- Years active: 2007-2016
- Spouse: Sachiin J. Joshi (m. 2012)
- Modeling information
- Hair color: Black
- Eye color: Brown

Urvashi Sharma (born 13 July,1984), also known as Raina Joshi, is an Indian actress and model who works in Bollywood.

== Personal life ==
Urvashi Sharma born on 13 July 1984. married in February 2012. She changed her name to Raina Joshi.

On 21 January 2014, she gave birth to a baby girl named Samaira. and on 26 November 2017, she gave birth to a boy.

== Filmography ==
Year	Title	Role	Language	Notes
2007	Naqaab	Sophia D'Costa Oberoi	Hindi	Nominated—Filmfare Award for Best Female Debut
2008	Three	Nisha	Telugu	
2009	Baabarr	Ziya	Hindi	
2010	Khatta Meetha	Anjali Tichkule (Sachin's sister)	Hindi	
2010	Aakrosh		Hindi	Guest Appearance
2012	Chakradhaar	Madira	Hindi	
2013	The Attacks Of 26/11	Jasmine/Receptionist Of Taj Mahal Palace and Tower Hotel	Hindi	

== Television ==
- 2008: Fear Factor: Khatron Ke Khiladi 1 as Contestant/Finalist
- 2016: Amma as Amma
