= ChaalBaaz =

- Theatrical release poster
- Directed by: Pankaj Parashar
- Screenplay by: Pankaj Parashar; Kamlesh Pandey
- Dialogues by: Kamlesh Pandey
- Story by: Rajesh Majumdar
- Based on: Seeta Aur Geeta (by Ramesh Sippy)
- Produced by: A. Poorna Chandra Rao
- Starring: Sunny Deol; Sridevi; Rajinikanth; Anupam Kher
- Cinematography: Manmohan Singh
- Edited by: Afaque Husain
- Music by: Laxmikant–Pyarelal
- Production company: Lakshmi Productions
- Release date: 8 December 1989
- Running time: 160 minutes
- Country: India
- Language: Hindi
- Box office: est. ₹15 crore (equivalent to ₹160 crore or US$17 million in 2023)

ChaalBaaz (Hindi pronunciation: [tʃaːlbaːz], transl. Trickster) is a 1989 Indian Hindi-language slapstick film directed by Pankaj Parashar and written by Rajesh Mazumdar and Kamlesh Pandey. It stars Sunny Deol, Sridevi and Rajinikanth with Anupam Kher as the main antagonist. The film revolves around identical twin sisters Manju and Anju, who get separated at birth. Anju lives with her malicious uncle, who plans to seize her property and traumatizes her by beating her. On the other hand, Manju grows up amidst a slum environment and is a tomboy.

The film was an adaptation of the film Seeta Aur Geeta and had its story written by Rajesh Mazumdar. It was produced by A. Poorna Chandra Rao under the Lakshmi Productions banner. The duo Laxmikant–Pyarelal composed the soundtrack with lyrics penned by Anand Bakshi. Manmohan Singh handled the cinematography while Afaque Hussain served as the editor.

Upon its release, ChaalBaaz was well received by critics and audiences alike, and emerged as a commercial success, eventually becoming the fifth-highest-grossing film of 1989. It had a net gross of about ₹8 crore (US$830,000). Among the elements of the movie that were highly appreciated were the film's story, music, and Sridevi's performance in the dual role, which is considered to be one of her best. At the 35th Filmfare Awards, the film received three nominations and won two awards: Best Actress (Sridevi) and Best Choreographer (Saroj Khan). It was remade twice in Kannada as Rani Maharani (1990) and Naa Rani Nee Maharani (2010).

== Plot ==
Identical twin sisters Anju and Manju are separated immediately after birth, thanks to their mentally handicapped nanny. Anju ends up with her uncle Tribhuvan and aunt Amba, while Manju is raised in a slum environment. Their parents were killed in a car accident orchestrated by Tribhuvan. However, in their will, they declare that their daughters will inherit their wealth once the twins turn 21. This results in Tribhuvan and Amba bringing Anju up as a coy, conservative, and easily frightened girl, merely keeping her alive so she can sign off the property in their name. The house servant Daddu, Anju's younger brother Raja, and their pet dog sympathize with her plight.

Anju likes classical dance and is unable to resist the urge to dance whenever she hears Indian classical music. On his birthday, Tribhuvan hosts a grand party. Among the several guests attending is his friend Vishwanath, who is very kind towards Anju. When Indian classical music plays at the party, Anju is unable to resist and bursts out dancing, but ends up accidentally slapping Tribhuvan. Although calm at the party, he beats Anju mercilessly with a whip the next day.

Manju is a modern, happy-go-lucky, and street-smart stage dancer. She spends her days tricking people in the village to forego her loans and is friends with her neighbour and taxi driver Jaggu. One night, she crashes into a bar to drink beer, where she meets and flirts with Suraj, Viswanath's son. Suraj soon falls for her. Vishwanath has been pestering Suraj to get married for a while now, and one day, when he shows him Anju's photo as a prospective marriage offer, he agrees, despite not knowing her name. When they visit Tribhuvan's place with their offer, Anju doesn't recognize Suraj and has a panic attack (courtesy of the injections given to her by Amba), which scares Suraj and Vishwanath away.

The reason Tribhuvan and Amba refuse to attend to marriage offers for Anju is that they want to get her married to Amba's brother Batuknath Lallanprasad Maalpani a.k.a. Balma. They call Balma to live with them, who soon begins harassing Anju and kills her pet dog when he leaps to her defense. Terrified at the turn of events, Anju runs away from home. On her way, she is harassed by strangers until Suraj saves her. That same day, Manju fights with Jaggu, and she sets off on her own path. In a twist of fate, their paths end up crossing, and while the sisters meet, they end up exchanging places. Thus, an injured Suraj is brought to Anju's house by Manju, while Anju ends up at Manju's slum. Manju also falls in love with Suraj.

Manju is easily able to assert control over Tribhuvan, Amba, and Balma. While the trio mistakes her for Anju and assumes her to be weak, Manju surprises them by displaying strength and aggression. Meanwhile, Anju starts getting close to Jaggu, who starts falling for the new "Manju". He proposes marriage to her, to which she agrees. Suraj sees Anju with Jaggu and thinks Manju is cheating on him, and breaks up with Manju.

The two sisters live their lives comfortably until one day, Balma spots Anju at Manju's place and correctly deduces that the one in their house is her identical-twin sister Manju. He hatches a plan and kidnaps Anju, taking her to a bungalow at Alibaug. One of Jaggu's friends overhears Balma speaking to Tribhuvan on the phone and informs Manju, Suraj, and Jaggu, who finally understand what's going on. They arrive at the bungalow, where Tribhuvan forces Anju to drink poison by holding her nanny captive. Suraj, Manju, and Jaggu fight off Tribhuvan's goons and save Anju, who properly meets and shares a tender moment with her twin, Manju. She is taken to the hospital and survives.

Finally, Suraj marries Manju while Jaggu marries Anju, and they live happily ever after. Both couples are blessed with twin girls that are born on the same day.

== Cast ==
- Sunny Deol as Suraj Prajapati – Manju’s boyfriend, later husband
- Sridevi in a dual role of identical twin sisters as
  - Manju Prajapati – Suraj’s girlfriend, later wife
  - Anju Pandyekar – Jackie’s girlfriend, later wife
- Rajinikanth as Jackie "Jaggu" Pandyekar – Anju’s boyfriend, later husband
- Anupam Kher as Tribhuvan Kushwaha
- Shakti Kapoor as Batuknath Lalanprasad Maalpani (Balma)
- Annu Kapoor as Dayal "Dadda" Sharma
- Saeed Jaffrey as Vishwanath Prajapati
- Aruna Irani as Madhumati
- Rohini Hattangadi as Amba Kushwaha
- Master Aftab as Raju Manju’s and Anju’s younger brother
- Kader Khan (special appearance) as Blind Beggar
- Johnny Lever (special appearance) as Tantrik Johnny Baba
- Ajay Wadhavkar (uncredited) as Bank Manager

== Production ==
=== Development ===
During the processing of Jalwa (1987) at Prasad studios in Chennai, eminent producer and director L. V. Prasad happened to see the film and liked it. He told producer A. Poorna Chandra Rao to get Pankuj Parashar to make a stylish film for him. When Rao approached Pankuj, he expressed his desire to make a film with Sridevi, who was popular at that time, owing to the success of Mr. India (1987). To this, Rao readily agreed. Rao enquired of Pankuj if he had a subject in mind, to which Pankuj promptly said that they would remake Seeta Aur Geeta (1972). He was given an immediate signing amount of ₹11,000 by Rao. When Pankuj met Sridevi and she asked for the script, he narrated to her the plot of Seeta Aur Geeta which she liked and communicated her willingness to be a part of the film to Rao in Telugu. According to Pankuj, while writing the screenplay, along with Kamlesh Pandey, he used to call Kamal Haasan everyday for tips, since they were friends. Haasan acted as a guide on ChaalBaaz, and advised Pankuj not to deviate from the plot of Seeta Aur Geeta. He also assured Pankuj that Sridevi would perform differently from Hema Malini.

=== Casting ===
Sunny Deol was cast to play the role of Suraj, one of the two male leads. Sunny Deol had accepted this role as his father, Dharmendra, had done the similar role in Seeta Aur Geeta (1972) and he wanted people to remember them for that. Anil Kapoor was initially approached for the role of the second male lead - Jaggu. But he turned down the offer, fearing that Sridevi's performance in a dual role would overshadow his part. Later, Rajinikanth was selected for the role of Jaggu. Rohini Hattangadi, who had previously played a character inspired by Sridevi in Jalwa, was cast as Anju's cruel aunt. Anupam Kher was cast as Tribhuvan, one of his memorable works as an antagonist. Annu Kapoor was cast in the role of the servant Daddu, a character double of his age at that time while Aftab Shivdasani appeared as a child artist. ChaalBaaz marked Sridevi's first dual role film in Hindi cinema, the others being Lamhe and Khuda Gawah. Speaking about her role, she said that she loved enacting Manju's character as a prankster, while also revealing that she had the greatest time shooting for ChaalBaaz and further she loved the song "Na Jaane Kahan Se Aayi Hai".

=== Filming ===
Principal photography took place primarily in Mumbai, being handled by Manmohan Singh. Sridevi herself was very closely related with the production. Acting upon her suggestion, Pankuj decided to change the costumes every four lines, and accordingly, separate sets were prepared for the song "Mera Bemar Tera Dil".

== Reception and legacy ==
Filmfare ranked Sridevi's performance in Chaalbaaz 4th in its list of "80 Iconic Performances of Hindi Cinema" stating that "Sridevi's penchant for giggles and her ability to look distinctly tearful when required polishes these performances to perfection. Hell". The Times of India article "Bollywood's Hit Double Roles" stated: "Sridevi's performance rocked the box office". Rediff featured the film in its countdown of "25 Best Double Roles in Bollywood" saying: "What you don't realize until you have seen ChaalBaaz is just how incredible Sridevi is at depicting both ends of the spectrum" and that the film "cemented her position as an actress with a killer comic timing". Speaking to The Indian Express about Sridevi's act in ChaalBaaz, the director Pankaj Parashar said "She proved her range with the movie and after that she got lots of offers which saw her in a double role". Her slapstick rain dance "Na jaane kahan se aayi hai" became a big hit with The Times of India describing it as a "Sridevi classic where she simply looked wow with her chirpy expressions and rain drops kissing her cheeks". The song ultimately led to choreographer Saroj Khan's winning the Filmfare Award for Best Choreography.

== Reboot ==
In 2021, a reboot titled ChaalBaaz in London was announced by T-Series with the same director and Shraddha Kapoor in the lead dual role; the film was later put on hold.

== Music ==
Music composer duo Laxmikant–Pyarelal composed the film's score with lyrics penned by Anand Bakshi. The music was produced by Zee Music Company. The film's songs were very well received, with some, such as "Na Jaane Kahan Se Aayi Hai" and "Tera Bimar Mera Dil" going on to become huge hits and classics. The music of "Na Jaane Kahan Se Aayi Hai" is copied from Stevie Wonder's Part-Time Lover.

=== Soundtrack ===
#	Title	Singer(s)	Notes
1	"Tera Bimar Mera Dil"	Kavita Krishnamurthy, Mohammad Aziz	OST album contains an extra verse edited out in the final cut of the film
2	"Na Jaane Kahan Se Aayi Hai"	Kavita Krishnamurthy, Amit Kumar	Appears twice in the soundtrack album
3	"Gadbad Ho Gayee"	Kavita Krishnamurthy, Jolly Mukherjee, Amit Kumar	Comedy sequence featuring in film
4	"Raste Mein Wo Khada Tha"	Kavita Krishnamurthy	Shot in "Bubbles" nightclub, Mumbai.
5	"Bhoot Raja"	Kavita Krishnamurthy, Sudesh Bhosle, Johnny Lever	Features the vocals of Bollywood comedian Johnny Lever
6	"Tandav" (Instrumental)		
7	"Dance Music" (Instrumental)		Used many times in various Indian films and drama serials.

== Awards ==
35th Filmfare Awards
Category	Recipients and Winners	Results
Best Actress	Sridevi	Won
Best Choreographer	Saroj Khan for "Na Jaane Kahan Se Aayi Hai"	Won
Best Female Playback Singer	Kavita Krishnamurthy for "Na Jaane Kahan Se Aayi Hai"	Nominated
