= Bhagyawan =

- Poster
- Directed by: S. K. Subash
- Screenplay by: Keshav Rathod
- Produced by: Upendra Jha
- Starring: Govinda; Juhi Chawla
- Cinematography: Russi Billimoria
- Edited by: A. R. Rajendran
- Music by: Anand–Milind
- Release date: 10 December 1993
- Country: India
- Language: Hindi

Bhagyawan (transl. : So Lucky) is a 1993 Indian Bollywood drama film directed by S. K. Subash and produced by Upendra Jha. It stars Govinda and Juhi Chawla in pivotal roles. Dialogues were written by Kamlesh Pandey. Lyricists were Sameer Anjaan, Hasrat Jaipuri and M. G. Hashmat. It was released on 10 December 1993. The film didn't perform well at the box office, and was declared as flop.

== Plot ==
Dhanraj, a hardworking man, finds out that Hira Seth, the man he works for, has impregnated his sister, whom he had sent to work as domestic help to the businessman's home. He tries to confront Hira, who refuses to accept the child as his own. As a result, Dhanraj's sister dies by suicide. When Dhanraj confronts Hira again, the latter fires him and says he will ensure the former will never get a job in town.

Some time later, unable to feed his wife, two sons and a daughter, he takes them to a beach to poison them and end his life. However, as he is about to serve them the poison-laced food, a young boy snatches it and runs. Dhanraj gives chase and catches the boy, but the food is spilt in the process. However, at that very spot, Dhanraj finds a wallet containing a lottery ticket and a newspaper cutout that says this ticket has a huge winning attached to it. Dhanraj takes this as a good omen, and returns with the boy to his family, introducing him to the kids as their new brother, Amar.

Years later, Dhanraj is a successful medicine manufacturer whose eldest son Vishwas works in his company, younger son Kishen is in college and secretly in love with Radha, Hira's daughter, and daughter Renu — the widow of an Air Force pilot killed in action — lives with them with her daughter because she does not want to go back to her in-laws for fear of being chided. Amar, meanwhile, has become a police inspector.

Circumstances lead to Amar leaving the household with his wife Geeta, a thief with a golden heart he has reformed, and Dhanraj's luck seems to leave with him. Will he and Dhanraj's luck ever return? What will befall the family till then?

== Cast ==
- Govinda as Police Inspector Amar
- Juhi Chawla as Geeta
- Pran as Dhanraj
- Asha Parekh as Savitri
- Aruna Irani as Renu
- Ranjeet as Hira
- Johnny Lever as Johnny
- Kirti Kumar as Vishwas
- Sripradha as Alka
- Suraj Chaddha as Kishen
- Shobha Singh as Radha
- Gurbachan Singh as Rana

== Soundtrack ==
#	Title	Singer(s)
1	"Dil Le Liya"	Amit Kumar, Sapna Mukherjee
2	"Gaadi Chali Baroda Se"	Kavita Krishnamurthy
3	"Mummy To Maan Gayi"	Udit Narayan, Sadhana Sargam
4	"Akkad Bakkad Timbaktu"	Abhijeet
5	"Sabka Saath Nibhaya Tune"	Abhijeet
6	"Ladke Ne Ladki Ko Dekha"	Sadhana Sargam
