= Banaras (2006 film) =

2006 film by Pankaj Parashar

- Poster
- Directed by: Pankaj Parashar
- Written by: Javed Siddiqui; L.C. Singh
- Produced by: L.C. Singh
- Starring: Urmila Matondkar; Dimple Kapadia; Raj Babbar; Ashmit Patel; Naseeruddin Shah
- Cinematography: Nirav Shah
- Edited by: Aseem Sinha
- Music by: Himesh Reshammiya
- Production company: Setu Creations
- Release date: 7 April 2006
- Running time: 122 minutes
- Country: India
- Language: Hindi

Banaras: A Mystic Love Story is a 2006 Indian Hindi-language musical drama film directed by Pankaj Parashar. The film takes place in the Hindu holy city of Varanasi (the city, once known as Banaras, serves as a destination for the pilgrimage of millions of Hindu worshippers annually) and is centered on the relationship of a young woman with her parents and her lover. It is the journey of a woman seeking answers to the mysteries of the human psyche, love, fear, life and death.

== Plot ==
A young woman, Shwetambari is the daughter of wealthy parents, Mahendranath and Gayatri Devi, respectively, studies at a university in the city. She falls in love with a low-caste mystic named Soham. Soham, after one meditative session, is illumined by Babaji, his mentor, and decides there is no harm in falling in love with the girl from the high-caste Brahmin family. This creates a citywide scandal. Shwetambari's parents initially object but eventually support the relationship, despite the objections of orthodox elements. The orthodox elements of society discourage the relationship actively, driving Shwetambari to depression. She eventually finds salvation in her religious beliefs. Eventually, when she discovers her own mother caused the murder of her fiancé, a disheartened Shwetambari leaves the city.

17 years later, Shwetambari, now a philosopher and religious scholar, is torn between returning to her beloved city of Varanasi to see her dying father and avoiding all the unpleasantness associated with her inter-caste liaison of the past. She returns, which creates turbulence in the mindscape of her so-called self-realized being.

== Cast ==
- Urmila Matondkar as Shwetambari
- Ashmit Patel as Soham
- Dimple Kapadia as Gayatri
- Raj Babbar as Mahendra Nath
- Naseeruddin Shah as Babaji
- Akash Khurana as Dr. Gopal Bhattacharya
- Arif Zakaria as Inspector Satpal Shukla
- Javed Khan as Gunjan Juari
- Chetana Das

== Soundtrack ==
Banaras

Soundtrack album by Himesh Reshammiya
- Released: 2006
- Recorded: 2006
- Venue: Mumbai
- Genre: Feature film soundtrack
- Language: Hindi
- Producer: Himesh Reshammiya

Himesh Reshammiya chronology
Humko Deewana Kar Gaye (2006)	Banaras (2006)	Shaadi Se Pehle (2006)

The music was composed by Himesh Reshammiya with lyrics by Sameer.

1. Rang Daalo - Shreya Ghoshal and Sonu Nigam
2. Yeh Hai Shaan Banaras Ki - Pt. Sanjeev Abhyankar.
3. Kitna Pyar Kartein Hain - Alka Yagnik
4. Ishq Mein Dilko - Sunidhi Chauhan and Sonu Nigam (Part 1)
5. Baajuband Khul Khul Jaaye - Pranab Kumar Biswas
6. Purab Se - Shreya Ghoshal
7. Ishq Mein Dilko - Sunidhi Chauhan and Sonu Nigam (Part 2)
8. Kitna Pyar Kartein Hain - Himesh Reshammiya
