= Betaal =

Indian television series

- Official promotional poster
- Genre: Horror; Action thriller; Zombie
- Created by: Patrick Graham
- Written by: Patrick Graham; Suhani Kanwar
- Directed by: Patrick Graham; Nikhil Mahajan
- Starring: Vineet Kumar Singh; Aahana Kumra
- Composers: Naren Chandavarkar; Benedict Taylor
- Country of origin: India
- Original language: Hindi
- No. of seasons: 1
- No. of episodes: 4

Production
- Executive producers: Patrick Graham; Jason Blum; Jeremy Gold; Marci Wiseman; Kilian Kerwin; John Penotti; Michael Hogan
- Producers: Gauri Khan; Gaurav Verma
- Cinematography: Shrinivas Achary; Tanay Satam
- Editors: Abhijit Deshpande; Sangeeth Varghese
- Camera setup: Single-camera
- Running time: 45-49 Minutes
- Production companies: Blumhouse Television; Red Chillies Entertainment; SK Global Entertainment

Original release
- Network: Netflix
- Release: 24 May 2020

Betaal, Betāl or Betāla (transl. "Demon") is an Indian zombie action horror television series set in a remote village that serves as the battleground between East India Company Army officer Lt. Col John Lynedoch, his battalion of zombie redcoats from the Indian Rebellion of 1857, and the fictional CIPD force. The series is written and directed by Patrick Graham and co-directed by National Award winner, Nikhil Mahajan. Produced by Blumhouse Productions and Red Chillies Entertainment, the series stars Vineet Kumar Singh and Aahana Kumra. The series received generally negative reviews, with praise for its performances and the use of mythology and zombies, but criticism for its editing and lack of thrill.

== Synopsis ==
Lieutenant Vikram Sirohi leads the Baaz Squad, an elite unit tasked with clearing land for development projects in remote Indian regions. Commandant Tyagi, the unit's senior commanding officer, is complicit with corrupt tycoon Ajay Mudhalvan. Under pressure from the commandments and harboring personal doubts about this ethics of his mission, Vikram follows orders to forcibly relocate villagers, unaware of the dark secrets lurking beneath the surface. When a tunnel clearing operation unleashes an undead army led by a British colonel bent on domination, Vikram and survivors must confront their past sins and battle for survival against the supernatural onslaught.

As chaos ensues, Vikram and his team uncover the sinister origins of the undead horde and the colonel's quest for power. Trapped in a remote barracks, they face internal strife as Tyagi falls under the colonel's control and Mudhalvan betrays them for his own survival. Vikram, haunted by past atrocities, finds redemption in protecting Saanvi, Mudhalvan's daughter, who holds a crucial key to stopping the colonel's rampage. Amidst the onslaught, sacrifices are made, and Vikram's ultimate act of selflessness triggers a cataclysmic showdown, leading to the destruction of the colonel's shrine and the release of Saanvi.

== Cast ==
- Vineet Kumar Singh as Vikram Sirohi
- Aahana Kumra as DC 'Ahlu' Ahluwalia
- Suchitra Pillai as Commandant Tyagi
- Jatin Goswami as Assad Akbar
- Jitendra Joshi as Ajay Mudhalvan
- Siddharth Menon as Nadir Haq
- Manjiri Pupala as Puniya
- Swapnil Kotriwar as Kanji
- Meenal Kapoor as Shakuntala Mudhalvan
- Yashwant Wasnik as Sarpanch
- Savita Bajaj as Mausi
- Ankur Vikal as Bhunnu
- Pankaj Upadhyay as Inspector Khurrana
- Richard Dillane as Colonel Lynedoch
- Krishna Singh Bisht as Kaushal
- Pawan Singh as Yadav
- Akhilesh Unnithan as Chandran
- Ratan Nag as Tripathi
- Shrishti Fadtare as Leila
- Tanmay Khemani as Drummer Boy
- Syna Anand as Saanvi Mudhalvan
- Harshvardhan Singh as pretas

== Episodes ==
No.	Title	Directed by	Written by	Original release date
1	"The Tunnel"	Patrick Graham; Nikhil Mahajan	Patrick Graham; Suhani Kanwar	24 May 2020
2	"The Barracks"	Patrick Graham; Nikhil Mahajan	Patrick Graham; Suhani Kanwar	24 May 2020
3	"The Battle"	Patrick Graham; Nikhil Mahajan	Patrick Graham; Suhani Kanwar	24 May 2020
4	"The Colonel"	Patrick Graham; Nikhil Mahajan	Patrick Graham; Suhani Kanwar	24 May 2020

== Production ==
On 15 June 2019, it was announced that Netflix had given the production a series order. The series is written and directed by Patrick Graham, co-written by Suhani Kanwar and co-directed by Nikhil Mahajan and Casting by Paragg Mehta. The show was produced by Red Chillies Entertainment. The shooting was wrapped up in August 2019. It was released on Netflix, making it the second collaboration between the production house and Netflix.

== Promotion and release ==
The trailer was released by Netflix India on 8 May 2020. The series started streaming on Netflix from 24 May 2020.

== Critical reception ==
Rahul Desai from Film Companion said that, "Betaal, for much of its four episodes, is a brilliant homegrown spoof on the zombie-folk horror genre. The zombies are utterly useless, spending their time knocking on closed doors and being butter-fingered flesh eaters." Poulomi Das on Silver Screen India provide another scathingly negative review for the show's opening season saying, "...the zombie thriller – another Netflix misfire in a series of misfires – somehow manages to be too long, repetitive and needlessly convoluted, stretching its one-line plot, glaringly under-written, way too thin." In contrast to these negative reviews, postcolonial scholar Johan Höglund's academic study of the series notes its political content and argues that the "zombie pandemic that erupts in Betaal is an attempt to render the apocalyptic violence and death that unregulated capitalism performs on ecology and precarious communities"
