= Chakradhaar =

- Theatrical release poster
- Directed by: Dharam Prakash; Shakur Sir
- Written by: Arsh
- Screenplay by: Arsh
- Story by: Arsh
- Produced by: Bharat Anand
- Starring: Abhishek Anand; Urvashi Sharma; Vidya Malvade; Darshan Jariwala; Zakir Hussain
- Edited by: Deepak Raju Gowda
- Music by: Songs; Anand Raj Anand; Background Score: Sanjoy Chowdhury
- Production company: Sir JVM Films Pvt.ltd
- Release date: 15 June 2012
- Country: India
- Language: Hindi

Chakradhaar is a 2012 Indian Hindi-language action film directed by Dharam Prakash, starring Abhishek Anand, Urvashi Sharma, Vidya Malvade, Zakir Hussain, Darshan Jariwala and Yashpal Sharma in the lead roles. The film has been produced by Bharat Anand. The music has been provided by Anand Raj Anand and Jatin Pandit, while the lyrics have been penned by Sameer. The song choreography has been done by Saroj Khan and Jeet Singh, while Abbas Ali Moghul handled the action choreography. The film is set in Banaras in the time of politics and corruption. This is the debut film of Abhishek Anand, and features him as a student who becomes a vigilante after facing corruption and violence in Varanasi.

The film released on 15 June 2012 to negative reviews from critics, with most critics panning Abhishek Anand's performance and eventually, the film ended up as a commercial failure.

== Plot ==
The story begins with a reporter, Avantika (Vidya Malvade), coming to take the interview of Shravan/Pandit (Abhishek Anand), who tells him how he, the gentle man, ended up becoming a killer.

In the past: Shravan joins Banaras University on his father's insistence, where he falls in love with Mandira (Urvashi Sharma), along with winning her father, Principal Shrivastav (Darshan Jariwala)'s belief. Soon, he realizes that he is caught in the fight against corruption and politics, running on the evil ideas of MLA Dharamraj (Akhilendra Mishra) and Yogiraj Choudhary (Yashpal Sharma) and his evil family members. They are responsible for all the crimes taking place in Banaras.

In the meanwhile, Shravan gets into many brawls with Dharamraj's son, Dev. Dev impregnates a girl and asks his father for marriage. But later on, he kills the girl in the college, and the blame comes on Principal Shrivastav, who is later killed, and the blame now comes on Shravan. He is arrested, but his life is saved by an honest Muslim police officer, after which he decides to change his ways. Even Mandira loses trust on him, and he tells her never to meet him again. He turns into Pandit, a killer with the aim of wiping out entire corruption and crime. Professor Ahuja also joins him. Together, they kill Dev and Dharamraj. After that, Sikandar (Zakir Hussain), a student of Professor Ahuja and Principal Shrivastav, asks Shravan to go to jail for some time, to which he agrees.

The story now comes to the present. Professor Ahuja, who thought Sikandar was supporting them, gets killed by Sikandar. Now, Shravan releases out of jail and finds that Avantika has got Mandira's mind changed, and she is ready to accept him. But Shravan goes to meet Sikandar, and promises to come back. Upon reaching the location, his friend Bhanu gets killed. A lot of goons arrive to kill Shravan, who takes on every goon and finishes them off. This fight is soon joined by Yogiraj, who, too, does not escape from Shravan's torment. He burns the mouth and to guess of Yogiraj, the way he had done to him when he fought against Dev. He hangs and kills him, after which Sikandar arrives with the police officers, and to Shravan's shock, tells that he had killed Principal Shrivastav, after which he and the police officers shoot Shravan, who now falls and is about to die.

Shravan's mind then gets filled with the past memories, and suddenly he gains consciousness. He then finds his own "Best Student of the Year" medal lying on a sack. This was the medal he had sold to buy a gun. He then gets up, and in the presence of everyone, strangles Sikandar with the medal, saying, "Your turn's over. Now it's my turn". Everyone watches as Sikandar and Shravan both fall to death, and the medal itself falls into Shravan's neck, showing him once again as the "Best Student of the Year."

The film ends as Mandira and Avantika cry, holding the medal.

== Cast ==
- Abhishek Anand as Shravan AKA Pandit
- Urvashi Sharma as Mandira
- Vidya Malvade as Avantika
- Akhilendra Mishra as Dharamraj Choudhary
- Kamlesh Sawant as Inspector Yadav
- Yashpal Sharma as Yogiraj Choudhary
- Zakir Hussain as Sikandar Hyatt
- Darshan Jariwala as Principal Shrivastav
- Maryam Zakaria as an item number "Billori"

== Production ==
The film has been produced by Bharat Anand under the banner Sir JVM films pvt.ltd. The movie was shot in 58 days in Mumbai and Banaras. The story of the film has been written by Arsh Rana, and the action department has been handled by Abbas Ali Moghul. The music has been provided by Anand Raj Anand and Jatin Pandit, along with the lyrics being provided by Sameer. The songs are choreographed by Jeet Singh and Saroj Khan.

== Soundtrack ==
Chakradhaar

Soundtrack album by Anand Raj Anand
- Released: 11 June 2012
- Recorded: 2012
- Genres: Feature film soundtrack, Soundtrack
- Length: 14:20
- Language: Hindi
- Label: T-Series

Track list
No.	Title	Lyrics	Singer(s)	Length
1.	"Har Mod Pe"	Sameer	Shaan	04:38
2.	"Bin Tere"	Sameer, Anand Raj Anand	Anand Raj Anand	04:10
3.	"Billori"	Sameer, Anand Raj Anand	Mamta Sharma, Anand Raj Anand	04:32
4.	"Chakradhaar (Theme)"	Sameer, Anand Raj Anand	Sukhwinder Singh	01:40
Total length:				14:20

=== Music review ===
The soundtrack of the film was released by T-Series. The music of the film received negative reviews. Joginder Tuteja from Bollywood Hungama rated the soundtrack 1.5/5, writing that "If not for fairly decent tracks like 'Bin Tere' and 'Har Mod Pe', Chakradhaar would have been a total downer."

== Release ==
Chakradhaar released on 15 June 2012. The film was passed with a U/A certificate by the Indian Censor Board with 2 cuts.

== Reception ==
The film received mostly negative reviews. The Times of India rated it 2.5/5. Fullyhyd rated it 1.5/5, writing "A fresh angle to the same story could have worked better, but unfortunately, the makers got it all wrong, and there goes another attempt at independent movie-making down the drain." Desimartini rated an average user rating of 1.8/5 for the film. Bollywood MDB rated it 1.5/5 and wrote "Not a bad film but not a watchable film too. A boring film! Better skip it and go for FERRARI KI SAWAARI!" Mid Day rated the film 1/5, writing "Filmed in Benares, the makers may have had the hinterland in mind as their audience. There is also an item number thrown in. But if only the Pandit had taken a good look at himself before embarking on saving other people’s lives. He needed help first. And the only way the audience can do it is by steering clear of this nonsense." Indiancinemareviews rated the film 3/5, calling it an "entertaining action film". In.com rated the film 1.4/10. Movietalkies rated the film 1.5/5, writing "Chakradhaar' Stuns, Shocks And Disappoints!". Fakir Hassen rated the film 2/5, writing "CHAKRADHAAR can be safely missed". Mouthshut.com rated the film 2/5.

== Box office ==
Due to big releases like Rowdy Rathore and Shanghai, the film was unable to get the attention of audiences. The film failed badly, as it made on Rs. 27 lakhs in its first week, and only 49 lakhs rupees in its total run at the box office of India.

== Home media ==
The satellite rights of the film were secured by Star Gold. The film was released on DVD, VCD and Blu-ray by T-Series.
