= Kamlesh Pandey =

Indian screenwriter

- Occupation: Screenwriter

Kamlesh Pandey is an Indian screenwriter and dialogue writer. He has won the Filmfare Awards for Tezaab, Star Screen Awards for Saudagar and IIFA Award for Rang De Basanti. He is from Ballia, Uttar Pradesh, and lives in Mumbai.

== Career ==
=== Film ===
Pandey started writing films since 1987 and went on to write various blockbusters; till date he has written over 40 films. He is a member of Film Writers Association, Mumbai, Indian Documentary Producers Association and Uttar Pradesh Film Development Council. He Has been visiting faculty for teaching screenplay at Subhash Ghai's Whistlingwoods.

=== Television ===
Pandey wrote cult investigative thriller Karamchand for Pankaj Parashar and social teleplays Kachchi Dhoop and Naqab for Amol Palekar.

In 1992, Pandey joined Zee TV as head of programming. He revived traditional Indian game shows like Antakshari and introduced new programs such as Tara, Campus, Banegi Apni Baat, Phillips Top Ten, Zee Horror Show, Shakti, Mere Ghar Aana Zindagi, and Filmi Chakkar. He left Zee TV in 1995.

Pandey won the Indian Television Academy Award 2007 for the Best Dialogue and Indian Telly Awards 2007 for the Best Screenplay and the Best Dialogue for Virrudh.

Pandey wrote Kuch Toh Log Kahenge aired on Sony TV since October 2011.

== Filmography ==
- Jalwa (1987)
- Tezaab (1988)
- ChaalBaaz (1989)
- Dil (1990)
- Saudagar (1991)
- Khalnayak (1993)
- Bhagyawan (1993)
- Shreemaan Aashique (1993)
- Jaan (1996)
- Itihaas (1997)
- Hameshaa (1998)
- Wajood (1998)
- Laawaris (1999)
- Shikari (2000)
- Farz (2001)
- Aks (2001)
- Janasheen (2003)
- Rang De Basanti (2006)
- Yuvvraaj (2008)
- Jazbaa (2015)
