= Himalay Putra =

- Cassette front cover for Himalay putra
- Directed by: Pankaj Parashar
- Written by: Honey Irani
- Dialogues by: Kamlesh Pandey
- Produced by: Vinod Khanna
- Starring: Vinod Khanna; Hema Malini; Akshaye Khanna; Anjala Zaveri; Shazia Malik; Danny Dengzongpa
- Cinematography: Dharam Gulati
- Edited by: Afaque Hussain
- Music by: Songs: Anu Malik; Score: Vanraj Bhatia
- Production company: Vinod Khanna Productions
- Release date: 4 April 1997
- Country: India
- Language: Hindi
- Budget: ₹4.25 crore
- Box office: ₹7.19 crore

Himalay Putra (transl. Son of the Himalayas) is a 1997 Indian Hindi-language romantic drama film directed by Pankaj Parashar and produced by Vinod Khanna. The film stars Vinod Khanna, Hema Malini, Akshaye Khanna (in his acting debut), Anjala Zaveri, Shazia Malik, and Danny Denzongpa.

== Plot ==
Himalay Putra (the son of the Himalayas) starts with the love story of Suraj and Seema and the immortal wall of disparity of status standing between themselves and their union. Seema being the daughter of a rich businessman and Suraj being a police inspector with a modest income, are destined to face the objection of Seema's father to their marriage. Amrish creates misunderstanding in Seema's heart for Suraj and she starts looking upon him as a greedy person who discarded her love for the sake of money. But the problem is that she has already got pregnant through him and after the demise of her father, she moves to the region of the Himalayas, giving birth to Abhay.

Abhay grows up misunderstanding his father by learning his mother's version of the past events. He is a devotee of Lord Shiva and Seema, instead of telling him (and the world) about his father, prefers to call him as Himalay Putra (the son of the Himalayas). He falls in love with Esha who is the daughter of their neighbour — Major Mathur but love is less important for him. What is more important for him is to locate his father and settle scores with him for his mother's sorrows.

And then one day, he comes across him. Suraj has now become the Assistant Commissioner of Police and is on the trail of a gang of smugglers headed by Rana. He saves the life of Suraj and both come on good terms accordingly. When Abhay brings Suraj to his home and introduces him to his mother, both of his parents are stunned to see each other after a long time gap of two decades. However, they prefer not to disclose their relationship to Abhay. But as the destiny has it, the activities of the smugglers' gang create such a situation that Abhay learns that Suraj is his father. The film ends with the removal of misunderstanding in the hearts of Seema and Abhay about Suraj and the happy union of all.

== Cast ==
- Vinod Khanna as ACP Suraj Khanna, Abhay's father.
- Hema Malini as Seema Malhotra, Abhay's mother.
- Akshaye Khanna as Abhay Khanna
- Anjala Zaveri as Esha Mathur
- Shazia Malik as Ruby
- Danny Denzongpa as Narsingh Rana, the main antagonist.
- Johnny Lever as Joe
- Satish Shah as Major Mathur, Esha's father
- Amrish Puri as Mr. Malhotra, Seema's father (special appearance)
- Rocky Grover as Vicky
- Nandita Thakur as Doctor
- Puneet Vashisht as Abhay's friend

== Music ==
Himalay Putra

Soundtrack album by Anu Malik and Vanraj Bhatia
- Released: 10 October 1996
- Genre: Feature film soundtrack

The music of the film was composed by Anu Malik, with lyrics penned by Dev Kohli, Rahat Indori and Nida Fazli.

No.	Title	Lyrics	Singer(s)	Length
1.	"Bam Bam Bhole"	Dev Kohli	Kavita Krishnamurthy, Udit Narayan, Shankar Mahadevan
2.	"I Am A Bachelor"	Dev Kohli	Vinod Rathod
3.	"Ishq Hua Tujhse Janam"	Rahat Indori	Alka Yagnik, Udit Narayan
4.	"Kaga Sab Tan Khaiyo"	Dev Kohli	Alka Yagnik, Sonu Nigam
5.	"Na Who Inkar Karti Hai"	Nida Fazli	Alka Yagnik, Udit Narayan
6.	"Tune Kaisa Jadoo Kiya"	Rahat Indori	Alka Yagnik, Udit Narayan
7.	"Kithe Nain Na Jodi"	Dev Kohli	Alka Yagnik, Sonu Nigam

== Awards and nominations ==
- Screen Awards for Best Male Debut - Akshaye Khanna

== Reception ==
A critic wrote "Any sensible, discerning cine buff can see the 'Himalayan" effort, energy, enterprise that's gone into the making of this magnificent movie-including the megabucks! An overwhelming, ostentatious offering, both in terms of production and technical values. Scripted by Honey Irani imaginatively, the direction of Pankaj Parasher carried quite a punch. He has ensured that all the highlights of the screenplay are intact in the visual narrative for all to see. Gripping stuff, really!".
