= Hungama (2003 film) =

2003 Indian film by Priyadarshan

- Theatrical release poster
- Directed by: Priyadarshan
- Written by: Priyadarshan
- Dialogues by: Neeraj Vora
- Based on: Poochakkoru Mookkuthi by Priyadarshan
- Produced by: Ganesh Jain; Vijay Galani; Pooja Galani
- Starring: Akshaye Khanna; Aftab Shivdasani; Rimi Sen; Paresh Rawal
- Cinematography: Tirru
- Edited by: N. Gopalakrishnan
- Music by: Songs: Nadeem-Shravan; Score: S. P. Venkatesh
- Production company: Venus Records & Tapes
- Distributed by: Venus Entertainment
- Release date: 1 August 2003
- Running time: 146 minutes
- Country: India
- Language: Hindi
- Budget: ₹6.4 crore
- Box office: ₹21.25 crore

Hungama (transl. Mayhem) is a 2003 Indian Hindi-language comedy film co-written and directed by Priyadarshan and produced by Venus Records & Tapes. The film stars Akshaye Khanna, Aftab Shivdasani, Rimi Sen, and Paresh Rawal while Shakti Kapoor, Rajpal Yadav, Tiku Talsania, and Shoma Anand appear in supporting roles. It is a remake of Priyadarshan's own 1984 Malayalam film Poochakkoru Mookkuthi, which itself is inspired by Charles Dickens' play The Strange Gentleman. The film was released on 1 August 2003 and was a commercial success.

== Plot ==
Anjali Patekar arrives in Mumbai looking for a job. To secure cheap lodging from a paranoid landlord Popat, who only rents to married couples, she fakes a marriage to Nandu Apte, an aspiring musician who has run away from home. Jeetu Sahai starts an electronics business after robbing his miserly father. His friend Anil woos Madhuri, the daughter of criminal Teja, by pretending to be millionaire businessman Radhe Shyam Tiwari's son, and conspires with Tiwari's servant Pandu to secure a marriage with her. Meanwhile, Radhe Shyam Tiwari and his wife, also named Anjali, decide to leave their village and shift to Mumbai, prompting Anil to flee. Teja approaches Tiwari to discuss the marriage, and accuses him of lying when he claims to have no knowledge of his supposed son. Anjali Tiwari also accuses her husband of having an extramarital affair.

Anjali visits Tiwari's mansion looking for a job, while Jeetu goes there to fix equipment and mistakes her for Tiwari's daughter. Later on, she applies for a position at Jeetu's store, who hires her in an attempt to woo her. Anjali continues the pretense, and Jeetu starts dropping her off at Tiwari's mansion every day. Radhe Shyam spots Jeetu outside his house as he does so, with his wife spotting the other Anjali at the same time. The couple becomes convinced that their spouses are having an affair with the younger counterparts.

Nandu falls for Anjali, while the landlord Popat's wife Dulari falls for him and asks him to elope. When Anjali reveals her proposed marriage to Raja, the son of her village's zamindar, Nandu scares him away when he arrives in Mumbai. Raja hides at Welcome Lodge, where Anil too is hiding. Teja learns of Anil's location and arrives at the lodge, but in confusion, beats up Raja instead. Meanwhile, Anjali, unable to keep up with her lies, skips work. A worried Jeetu storms up to Tiwari and demands that he let him marry Anjali, while Tiwari, believing that he is talking about his wife, starts a feud with both him and his wife.

Nandu lies to Dulari about eloping, and tells her that he will be at Welcome Lodge. She recruits a corrupt policeman, Waghmare, to pick him up, but he mistakenly picks up a now insane and paranoid Raja, who fights back and leads Waghmare and the lodge staff into a chase. Jeetu arrives at Tiwari's house, and to clear up the misunderstanding about the affair, he calls Anjali, who tells them the truth. Teja reappears, still furious about the marriage, and takes them all to his warehouse. Nandu's family offers a reward to return him home, prompting Popat to chase him. They both end up at Teja's warehouse, along with Raja and his pursuers, where a fight ensues until the police arrives. In the aftermath, Jeetu and Nandu confront Anjali and profess their love, making her choose. She chooses Nandu, and Jeetu quietly agrees.

== Cast ==
- Akshaye Khanna as Jeetendra Sahai, a.k.a. Jeetu from Videocon
- Aftab Shivdasani as Nandan "Nandu" Apte
- Paresh Rawal as Radheshyam Tiwari
- Rimi Sen as Anjali Patekar
- Shoma Anand as Anjali Pandey Tiwari, Radheshyam's wife
- Shakti Kapoor as "Raddiwala" Teja Bhai / a.k.a. Kachra Seth
- Rajpal Yadav as Raja / Tulsi Das Khan
- Tiku Talsania as Popat Seth, Nandu and Anjali's landlord
- Neena Kulkarni as Renuka Sahai, Jeetendra's mother
- Amit Divetia as Advocate Chandra Kanth Sahai, Jeetendra's miserly father and Radhe's legal advisor
- Upasna Singh as Dulari Seth, Popat's wife
- Manoj Joshi as Sub-Inspector Anand Waghmare
- Sanjay Narvekar as Anil Singh / Munna Tiwari, Radhe's fake son
- Razak Khan as Babu Bisleri, a worker at Welcome Lodge
- Amin Gazi as Bholu Singh
- Jagadish as Pandu Rajan, Radhe's servant
- Nandu as Tejas Iyer, Welcome Lodge Manager
- V. B. K. Menon as Kachra Seth's henchman
- Jyothi Joshi as Madhavi K. Seth, Teja Bhai's daughter
- Varun Seth as Babban
- Donny Kapoor as Anjali's friend
- Anu Ansari as Nurse
- Jaydutt Vyas as Nandu's manager
- Shaan as himself in the song "Chain Aapko Mila"
- Sadhana Sargam as herself in the song "Chain Aapko Mila"

== Production ==
The first day of shooting took place in Chennai, where the climax was filmed right on the first day.

== Soundtrack ==
Hungama

Soundtrack album by Nadeem–Shravan
- Released: 22 May 2003
- Genre: Film soundtrack
- Length: 30:45
- Label: Venus Records & Tapes

Nadeem–Shravan chronology
Qayamat: City Under Threat (2003)	Hungama (2003)	Footpath (2003 film) (2003)

The music of Hungama was composed by Nadeem–Shravan with lyrics written by Sameer. All the songs were instant hits. Songs like "Tera Dil", "Pari Pari", "Hum Nahin" are still popular among the listeners.

=== Track listing ===
No.	Title	Singer(s)	Length
1.	"Pari Pari"	Babul Supriyo	04:48
2.	"Tera Dil"	Udit Narayan, Alka Yagnik	04:51
3.	"Ishq Jab" (Female Version)	Richa Sharma	04:51
4.	"Hungama" (Title Song)	Shaan	02:09
5.	"Hum Nahin"	Abhijeet Bhattacharya, Alka Yagnik, Sonu Nigam	05:57
6.	"Chain Aap Ko"	Sadhana Sargam, Shaan	05:00
7.	"Ishq Jab" (Male Version)	Kumar Sanu	04:51

== Reception ==
=== Box office ===
The film grossed ₹21.25 crore worldwide, against a budget of ₹6 crore.

=== Critical response ===
Taran Adarsh of IndiaFM gave the film 2 out of 5, writing, "On the whole, HUNGAMA is a light entertainer with several hilarious moments." Ronjita Kulkarni of Rediff.com called it a "confusing comedy," writing, "The film has too many sub-plots and too many characters. The result is that all the characters are half-baked and shallow."

== Sequel ==
In November 2019, Priyadarshan announced Hungama 2 with Paresh Rawal, Shilpa Shetty, Meezaan Jafri and Pranitha Subhash in lead roles. The filming started on 6 January 2020 in Mumbai. The film was scheduled to be released on 14 August 2020 but delayed due to COVID-19 pandemic. The film was released on Disney+ Hotstar on 23 July 2021 owing to closure of cinemas due to COVID-19 pandemic.
