= Kudrat (1998 film) =

- Directed by: Raj N. Sippy
- Written by: Kader Khan (dialogues)
- Screenplay by: Anil Kalelkar
- Story by: Raju Saigal
- Produced by: Romu N. Sippy
- Starring: Akshaye Khanna; Urmila Matondkar
- Cinematography: Akram Khan
- Edited by: Prashanth Khedekar; Vinod Nayak
- Music by: Rajesh Roshan
- Production company: Film Enterprises
- Release date: 11 December 1998
- Running time: 151 minutes
- Country: India
- Language: Hindi

Kudrat (transl. Nature) is a 1998 Indian Hindi-language romantic action film directed by Raj N. Sippy. The film stars Akshaye Khanna and Urmila Matondkar in the lead roles.

== Plot ==
Vijay Varma learns a few lessons about love and life. Wooing his sweetheart proves an arduous task as poor Vijay faces constant rejection by the woman who has captured his heart as well as by her family. But when both do a startling volte-face, which is followed by further indecision, Vijay's life seems caught in a perpetual state of bewilderment.

== Cast ==
- Akshaye Khanna in a dual role as
  - Vijay Verma
  - Ajay Verma (Before Plastic Surgery): Vijay's father
- Urmila Matondkar as Madhu
- Aruna Irani as Shanti
- Paresh Rawal as Sukhiram
- Kader Khan as Vijay's Grandfather
- Anant Mahadevan as Corrupt Police Inspector
- Ravi Kishan as Ravi
- Nawab Shah as Sukhiram's Brother
- Shalini Kapoor as Meena
- Ashish Nagpal as Ajay Verma (After Plastic Surgery)
- Kiran Kumar as Karan Verma
- Gavin Packard as Ravi's Goon

== Soundtrack ==
The soundtrack was composed by Rajesh Roshan. In November 1998, former vice-president of political party Bharatiya Janata Yava Morcha, Rakesh Sethi filed a case against Dev Kohli and singer Poornima for using vulgar language in the song "Ab Tak Hai Poori Azaadi". A local court issued a non-bailable warrant against both on 1 April 2003.

All music is composed by Rajesh Roshan.

No.	Title	Lyrics	Singer(s)	Length
1.	"Ab Tak Hai Puri Azadi"	Dev Kohli	Abhijeet, Poornima	5:36
2.	"Aaj Hoke Rahe Apna Milan"	Indeevar	Udit Narayan, Preeti Uttam	6:25
3.	"Ishq Bhala Kya Hai"	Indeevar	Alka Yagnik, Vinod Rathod	5:59
4.	"Humse Mohabbat Mein"	Indeevar	Kumar Sanu, Sadhana Sargam	5:56
5.	"Deewane Do Dil Mile"	Dev Kohli	Alka Yagnik, Udit Narayan	6:43
6.	"Main Hoon Albeli"	Indeevar	Shweta Shetty	6:25
7.	"Deewane Do Dil Mile (Instrumental)"			3:01
8.	"Tujhe Dene Ko"	Indeevar	Kavita Krishnamurthy, Abhijeet	6:23
