= Swapnil Kotriwar =

Indian Actor

- Born: 8 October 1988 (age 38); Raigarh, Chhattisgarh, India
- Occupations: Actor, Writer, Director, Producer
- Years active: 2008–present
- Known for: Paan Singh Tomar, Aakrosh, Rakta Charitra 2, and Betaal
- Notable work: Paan Singh Tomar and Court Martial

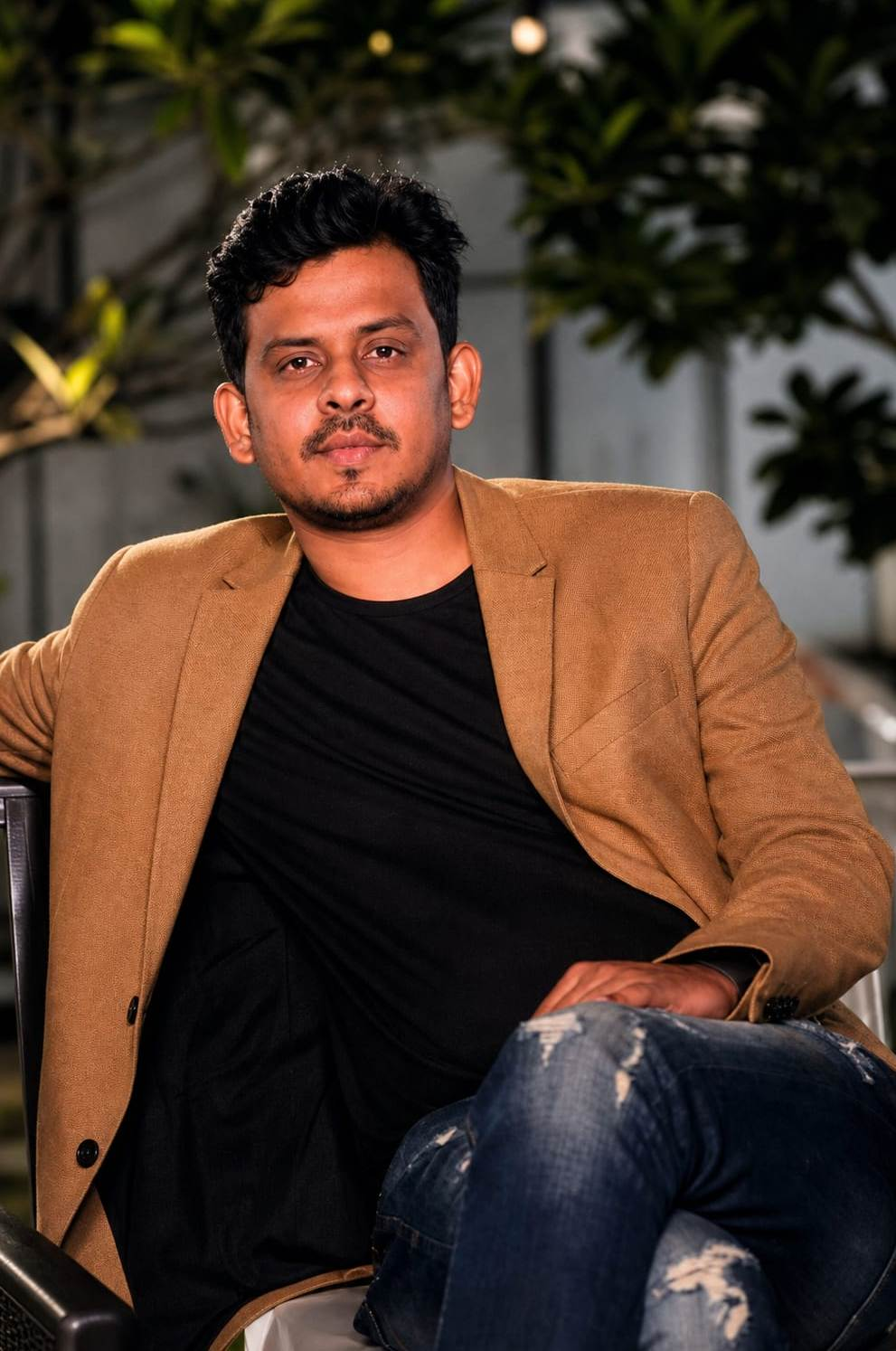
Swapnil Kotriwar 2026 image

Swapnil Kotriwar (Born October 8, 1988) is an Indian actor known for his work in Hindi films and television series. He is recognized for his role in the movie Paan Singh Tomar, Court Martial and web series like Betaal in (2020). His film Paan Singh Tomar won two National Film Awards. He graduated from the National School of Drama (NSD). Kotriwar is the Founder of Crazymoon Moving Pictures Pvt Ltd, a production house involved in film production. He served as the writer director, and co-producer of the film "Machhli Jal Ki.." which was officially released on the Jar Picture Youtube channel.

== Early life ==
Swapnil was born in the city of Raigarh, Chhattisgarh, India. After completing his education at the National School of Drama (NSD), he began his career in the film industry and later moved to Mumbai, Maharashtra, where he currently continues his work in the entertainment industry.

== Filmography ==
List of films and television shows by Swapnil Kotriwar
Year	Title	Role	Notes
2008	Sunday	Journalist	Film
2010-18	Crime Patrol		Television series
2010	Aakrosh	Dinu	Film
2012	Paan Singh Tomar	Hanumanta Singh	Film
2010	Rakta Charitra 2	Chandu	Film
2020	Betaal	Kanji	Web series
2020	Court Martial	Ramchandra	Film
2022	Chatrapathi		Remake
