= Naqaab (2007 film) =

- Movie poster
- Directed by: Abbas–Mustan
- Written by: Shiraz Ahmed
- Dialogues by: Jitendra Parmar; Anurag Prapanna
- Produced by: Kumar S Taurani; Ramesh Taurani
- Starring: Bobby Deol; Akshaye Khanna; Urvashi Sharma
- Cinematography: Ravi Yadav
- Edited by: Hussain A. Burmawalla
- Music by: Pritam
- Production company: Tips Industries
- Distributed by: Eros International
- Release date: 13 July 2007
- Running time: 115 minutes
- Country: India
- Language: Hindi
- Budget: ₹190 million
- Box office: ₹212 million

Naqaab (transl. Mask) is a 2007 Indian Hindi-language romantic thriller film directed by Abbas–Mustan. The film stars Bobby Deol, Akshaye Khanna, and debutant Urvashi Sharma. Inspired by the film Dot the I, Naqaab was released on 13 July 2007 and bombed at the box office.

== Plot ==
The story revolves around the life of Sophia, who lives in Goa. When she is stalked and then attacked by a rapist named Rakesh, Sophia relocates to Dubai. Here she rents a room in a villa near Jumeirah Beach, owned by wealthy star Karan Oberoi. Six months later, he proposes to her, and she accepts. Shortly before the marriage, she meets with an unemployed actor, Vikram "Vicky" Malhotra, and is attracted to him, but decides to go ahead and marry Karan. At the altar, she changes her mind, ditches him, and decides to move in with Vicky. But things take a turn for the worse.

When Karan is embarrassed in front of everyone by being dumped at the altar, he commits suicide, and when Sophia finds out about this, she realises it was her fault that Karan is dead. Soon enough, it is revealed that it was actually Vicky's fault Karan died because Vicky was hired by a film director named Rohit Shroff, who decided to make a film on Karan's life and therefore was hired to enter Sophia's life. Sophia gets mad at Vicky and then Rohit arrives at Vicky's flat, and it turns out that Karan is Rohit Shroff.

It is revealed that Rohit, aka Karan decided to make a film showcasing real life, so he hired Vicky to enter Sophia's life and make her fall in love with him. Then he faked his suicide, and that would be the ending of the film. It turns out he had hidden cameras in Vicky's home and recorded all the intimate scenes between him and Sophia. Rohit then convinces Vicky and Sophia that if they do not go along with the film, he would upload the intimate scenes of them on the internet and turn them into porn stars. Therefore, Vicky and Sophia let the movie be released. After 3 months, at the premiere, Rohit plans a publicity stunt by getting shot by Vicky (with fake bullets), then getting up and revealing he is still alive.

However, nothing goes as planned. Vicky shoots Rohit with the fake gun multiple times, but it turns out that the gun had real bullets, and Rohit brutally dies. All the movie's staff are arrested. In custody, Vicky explains to the police officers that it was all supposed to be a publicity stunt, and they let him go. Vicky escapes from the police station, and all the blame goes on the film's associate producers, as they had planned the stunt in the first place. Vicky arrives at the hospital and meets Sophia, where it is revealed that Sophia and Vicky have actually murdered Rohit. Sophia shot with a real gun when Vicky was shooting with the fake gun to avoid detection and then dropped the gun in the associate producer's pocket to frame him.

In the end, the associate producers are trapped in jail. Sophia received Rohit's wealth and property and lives a rich lifestyle as she marries Vicky, who is now a famous superstar due to the film Rohit made, which turned out to be a blockbuster.

== Cast ==
- Bobby Deol as Karan Oberoi / Rohit Shroff
- Akshaye Khanna as Vicky Malhotra
- Urvashi Sharma as Sophia D'Costa / Sophie
- Vikas Kalantri as Siddharth Mishra (executive producer 1)
- Vishal Malhotra as Ronnie Chaturvedi (executive producer 2)
- Rajendranath Zutshi as Detective Sam
- Archana Puran Singh as TV Reporter
- Ganesh Yadav as ACP Mhatre, Goa Police

== Response ==
Taran Adarsh of IndiaFM wrote, "Naqaab belongs to Akshaye, who delivers yet another powerful performance. He's splendid, the real scene stealer, the soul of the enterprise. Bobby is relegated to the backseat in the first hour, but manages to make his presence felt in the second half. Urvashi Sharma gets a dream launch and she utilizes the golden opportunity completely."

== Soundtrack ==
The soundtrack of Naqaab was composed by Pritam, with lyrics were by Sameer. The song "Ek Din Teri Raahon", sung by Javed Ali and Zubeen Garg was a major success in 2007 and its popularity has endured with time.

Track No	Song	Singer(s)	Music
1	"Ek Din Teri Raahon"	Javed Ali	Pritam
2	"Aye Dil Pagal Mere" (Remix by DJ Suketu)	Sonu Nigam	Pritam
3	"Aa Dil Se Dil Mila Le"	Alisha Chinoy & Krishna	Pritam
4	"Ae Dil Pagal Mere" (Reprise)	Sunidhi Chauhan	Pritam
5	"Ek Din Teri Raahon" (Remix by DJ A-Myth & Jatin Sharma)	Zubeen Garg	Pritam
6	"Aa Dil Se Dil Mila Le" (Remix by DJ Akbar Sami)	Alisha Chinoy & Krishna	Pritam
7	"Aye Dil Pagal Mere"	Sonu Nigam	Pritam
8	"Disguised Intentions" (Instrumental)	Instrumental	Pritam
