= Pankaj Parashar =

Indian film and television director

- Born: India
- Occupation: Film director
- Years active: 1984–present
- Known for: Jalwa (1987)
- Spouse: Asmita Parashar

Pankaj Parashar is an Indian film and television director. Among his most-known are police-thriller Jalwa (1987) starring Naseeruddin Shah, ChaalBaaz (1989), and television detective series Karamchand (1985). He also makes television commercials, corporate films and documentaries.

== Career ==
Parashar debuted with the Hindi comedy Ab Ayega Mazaa (1984). This was followed by the next year with the television series Karamchand (1985), starring Pankaj Kapoor as lead detective Karamchand with Sushmita Mukherjee as assistant Kitti and Sanjay Gupta as the assistant director. It was broadcast on India's national television channel DD National, and it was one of India's first detective series. Sony Entertainment Television revived this serial in February 2007.

He became the first director to cast a then-art film actor Naseeruddin Shah in a commercial film, Jalwa (1987) (a remake of Beverly Hills Cop) and in his 1989 film, ChaalBaaz (a remake of Seeta Aur Geeta) got lead actress Sridevi, the Filmfare Best Actress Award. Both were big hits. Parashar's Malfunction was awarded the 1980 Filmfare Award for Best Documentary.

In the 1990s he directed the big budget film Rajkumar which had the first major computer graphic effects in a Hindi film. BBC's Tomorrows World programme interviewed Parashar for it, stating he had brought Indian graphics to the level of the west. Himalay Putra which was produced by Vinod Khanna and marked the debut of his son Akshaye Khanna. His venture Banaras (2006), was set in Benaras city, starring Urmila Matondkar and Naseeruddin Shah as leads, and was selected for the International film festival in Goa.

Mazaa Films has been producing and directing feature films, TV serials, documentaries, corporate films and computer graphics for the last 25 years. Headed by Pankuj Parashar, Gold medalist Direction course FTII 1980, the company has won all the major awards in the country starting with the Filmfare award for the best short in 1980.

He is the life member of International Film and Television Club & International Film and Television Research Centre of Asian Academy of Film & Television.

== Education ==
Film & Television Institute of India (FTII), Pune Diploma in Film Direction & Screenplay Writing. Jai Hind College, Mumbai Bachelor of Commerce (Economics, Mathematics and Statistics)

== Filmography ==
=== As film director ===
- Ab Ayega Mazaa (1984)
- Jalwa (1987)
- Peechha Karo (1986)
- ChaalBaaz (1989)
- Rajkumar (1996)
- Himalayputra (1997)
- Tumko Na Bhool Paayenge (2002)
- Meri Biwi Ka Jawab Nahin (2004)
- Inteqam: The Perfect Game (2004)
- Banaras (2006)
- Banarasi Jasoos (2016) (short film)
- Skin Of marble (2017) (short film)

=== Television ===
- Karamchand (1985)

=== As writer ===
- It Was Raining That Night (2005)
