= Ittefaq (2017 film) =

2017 Indian film by Abhay Chopra

- Theatrical release poster
- Directed by: Abhay Chopra
- Written by: Abhay Chopra; Shreyas Jain; Nikhil Mehrotra
- Based on: Signpost to Murder (English) by George Englund
- Produced by: Renu Ravi Chopra; Gauri Khan; Hiroo Yash Johar; Karan Johar
- Starring: Akshaye Khanna; Siddharth Malhotra; Sonakshi Sinha
- Cinematography: Michal Luka
- Edited by: Nitin Baid
- Music by: Score: Brian Wayne Transeau; Theme Song: Tanishk Bagchi
- Production companies: Red Chillies Entertainment; B. R. Studios; Dharma Productions
- Distributed by: AA Films (India); Yash Raj Films (Overseas)
- Release date: 3 November 2017
- Running time: 105 minutes
- Country: India
- Language: Hindi
- Budget: ₹29 crore
- Box office: est. ₹56.26 crore

Ittefaq (transl. Coincidence) is a 2017 Indian Hindi-language neo-noir mystery thriller film directed by Abhay Chopra, written by Chopra, Shreyas Jain and Nikhil Mehrotra, and produced by Gauri Khan and Shah Rukh Khan under Red Chillies Entertainment in association with Renu Ravi Chopra under B. R. Studios and Hiroo Yash Johar and Karan Johar under Dharma Productions. An adaptation of the eponymous 1969 film by Yash Chopra, the film stars Akshaye Khanna, Sidharth Malhotra and Sonakshi Sinha, and has a Rashomon effect storytelling style.

The film was released on 3 November 2017. It was a moderate commercial success at the box office and received positive reviews from critics.

== Plot ==
Vikram Sethi is an acclaimed British writer of Indian descent. On the launch of his third book in Mumbai, he finds his publisher wife Katherine dead in their hotel room. The police suspect him, so he flees by car. As the police give chase, his car overturns and he escapes with injuries, taking shelter in a nearby apartment. Maya, a young housewife who lives there, spots a police car outside and rushes there for help. The police find Vikram next to the body of her murdered lawyer husband, Shekhar. They also find burnt photographs in the trash. Dev Verma, an officer investigating the double murder, interrogates Vikram and Maya.

According to Vikram's account, he fled the police because he feared he would be framed for his wife's murder. He found Maya at her door and asked for help. He adds that his wife did not attend the book launch, as she was unwell and took medicines for a heart ailment. Vikram entered Maya's flat and claims that she attempted to seduce him. Maya introduced Chirag, who entered her house, as her husband to Vikram. When Vikram saw a wallpaper photo on her PC and realised Chirag is not Maya's husband, Chirag struck him with a candle-holder and Vikram lost consciousness. Upon waking, he found Shekhar's body next to him. While in custody Vikram was shown removing his shoe as if his foot is sore or shoe is pinching him.

According to Maya's account, she found an injured Vikram at her door, asking for help. She lets him in only to find out from the news that the police are looking for him for the murder of his wife. Vikram whipped out a knife and overpowered her, and began searching for documents at Shekhar's desk when she turned a visiting Chirag away, with whom she confessed of having an extramarital affair. Around midnight, her husband returned and struggled to free her from Vikram. Maya rushed outside to a police vehicle for help. By the time she returned, Vikram had killed her husband with a candle-holder.

Meanwhile, the police find that a gang rape victim named Sandhya recently killed herself because Vikram had written his third book about that incident and, hoping to prevent his third book from being a failure, he had leaked her identity to generate buzz. Examination of Katherine's body reveals that she had died of a heart attack.

The forensic team informs Dev that Shekhar was attacked on the head by someone who was at least 6 feet tall. The police initially suspect Vikram as he is 6’1". However, it is found that the burnt photographs were those of Maya and Chirag, who is also about 6 feet tall. The photographs had been taken by a detective hired by Shekhar. The police eventually conclude that Vikram's account is true and Maya and Chirag had killed Shekhar when he confronted them with the photos. Moreover, there was no mud on Shekhar's shoes at the time of his death. It had rained at 11 pm and there was mud on the streets. Vikram had stated that Shekhar had come home at 7:30, hence his account was believed to be true whereas Maya's account of her husband returning home at 12 am was labelled false as a result. Vikram is deemed innocent and released from custody. He cremates his wife's body, and Maya and Chirag are arrested and charged with Shekhar's murder.

At home, Dev is reading Vikram's second book when his wife Meera spoils that the protagonist dies of drug overdose. Dev rushes to the forensic doctor to check if Vikram's wife could have died from an overdose of the medicine she had been taking for her heart. They discover that the capsules had been tampered with and the dose was made three times higher than normal, which caused Katherine's fatal heart attack.

Dev calls Vikram while the latter is about to catch a flight back to London. On the phone, Vikram confesses to having killed Katherine and Shekhar. He killed Katherine because she was threatening to charge him for Sandhya's suicide. Shekhar was the lawyer working with her to file a case against him. He fled to Shekhar's house to destroy the legal documents of the case. When Maya went out to seek help, he killed her husband and stumbled across the photographs with her lover. He partially burnt them and threw them in the trash, banking on the conviction that the police would find the ominously burnt, adulterous pictures, creating a convincing story to dupe the police, which would then insinuate the inquisitory suspicion that it was Maya, in conjunction with Chirag who had orchestrated the murder of her husband Shekhar in order to conceal her affair. He also switched Shekar's muddy shoes with his own. He tells Dev that he has already cremated his wife's body; thus there is no evidence left.

Dev decides to catch Vikram and punish him even if he has to take an illegal action to do so. However, Vikram leaves for London on his flight as Dev watches helplessly.

== Cast ==
- Akshaye Khanna as Dev Verma
- Siddharth Malhotra as Vikram Sethi
- Sonakshi Sinha as Maya Sinha
- Pavail Gulati as Chirag
- Mandira Bedi as Meera Verma
- Sameer Sharma as Shekhar Sinha
- Kimberly Louisa McBeath as Katherine Sethi

== Production ==
=== Development ===
The film was announced in April 2016. Ittefaq is an adaptation of a 1969 film with the same name, produced by B. R. Chopra and directed by Yash Chopra. The film starred Rajesh Khanna, Iftekhar and Nanda in lead roles. Sidharth Malhotra reprises Khanna's character, Sonakshi Sinha reprises Nanda's character, while Akshaye Khanna reprises Iftekhar's character. The film is directed by Abhay Chopra, the grandson of B. R. Chopra, the producer of the original film.

=== Casting ===
Akshaye Khanna, Sidharth Malhotra and Sonakshi Sinha were cast in the lead roles.

=== Filming ===
The film was shot on a fifty-day non-stop schedule. Principal photography commenced in February 2017. The film was shot entirely in Mumbai.

== Marketing ==
Before the release of the film, the created a digital media campaign, requesting viewers not to disclose the culprit after watching the film. Rather than using traditional and costly marketing techniques (reality show promotion, media interviews and city tours), the producers decided to focus on television, radio and print advertising.

== Reception ==
=== Critical response ===
On the review aggregator website Rotten Tomatoes, 91% of 11 critics' reviews are positive, with an average rating of 5.8/10. India Today reviewed "Sidharth-Sonakshi's murder mystery will keep you on your toes". The Indian Express stated the movie was "a smart, gripping whodunit". Deccan Chronicle called the movie "A crackling whodunnit".

=== Box office ===
The film, which was released on 1100 screens throughout India, had a moderate opening of ₹ 40 million. Ittefaq was in competition with Golmaal Again, which released on Diwali, and had been in a strong position even after its third week. Hollywood's Thor: Ragnarok of the popular Marvel Cinematic Universe, which recorded strong opening collection, was released concurrently with the film thus affecting its business. Despite the tough competition from Golmaal Again and Thor: Ragnarok, Ittefaq was able to earn as much as ₹40 million.

== Music ==
Track listing
No.	Title	Lyrics	Music	Singer(s)	Length
1.	"Ittefaq Se (Raat Baaki)"	Tanishk Bagchi, Groot	Tanishk Bagchi	Jubin Nautiyal, Nikhita Gandhi	3:20

The theme song ''Ittefaq Se'' was recreated by Tanishk Bagchi from the song "Raat Baaki Baat Baaki" from the film Namak Halal (1982), originally composed by Bappi Lahiri and sung by Asha Bhosle, Shashi Kapoor and Lahiri. Unlike most mainstream Bollywood films, which are musicals, the film does not contain any songs like the original 1969 film.

== See also ==
- List of Indian films without songs
