= Jalwa =

- Movie poster
- Directed by: Pankaj Parashar
- Written by: Kamlesh Pandey
- Produced by: Gul Anand
- Starring: Naseeruddin Shah; Archana Puran Singh; Saeed Jaffery; Johnny Lever
- Music by: Anand–Milind; Remo Fernandes
- Release date: 23 January 1987
- Country: India
- Language: Hindi

Jalwa is a 1987 Indian Hindi-language action film directed by Pankaj Parashar and produced by Gul Anand. The film stars Naseeruddin Shah and Archana Puran Singh. The film is set in Goa, where it was mostly shot. It is an unofficial remake of the 1984 American film Beverly Hills Cop. It was remade in Telugu as Trinetrudu (1988) by A. Kodandarami Reddy, starring Chiranjeevi.

== Plot ==
Kapil's younger brother, Buntu, dies as a result of a drug overdose. Kapil vows to put an end to drugs and drug-dealers, by joining the police. He soon attains the title of C. I. D. Inspector. He lives in Bombay with his mom.

One day, his friend from Goa, Albert Pinto, is killed in front of him. He vows to avenge his death, but the local police will not permit him to do so. They assign this incident to another inspector. Frustrated, Kapil travels to Goa. Once there, he finds out that he has no powers as a policeman, and the Goa Police regard him as a nuisance. He attempts to uncover Albert's death, with the help of Jojo, but instead gets into brawls, is arrested, and is escorted by the local police, back to Bombay.

Kapil escapes from police custody, and soon he is on the run, not only from the police, but local goons also, who will not hesitate to kill him.

== Cast ==
- Naseeruddin Shah as Inspector Kapil
- Archana Puran Singh as Jyothi/Jojo
- Pankaj Kapur as Albert Pinto
- Tejeshwar Singh as DD
- Dalip Tahil as Champ
- Rohini Hattangadi as Sribaby
- Saeed Jaffrey as Yakub Saeed
- Johny Lever as Murty
- Cyrus Broacha as Jyothi's younger brother Suresh
- A K Hangal as Jyothi's dad
- Akash Khurana as Sub-Inspector Hosi Wadia
- Satish Kaushik as Sub-Inspector Ramu Ghadiali
- Javed Khan Amrohi as Taxi driver
- Kamini Kaushal as Kapil's mother
- Rajesh Puri as DD's Pandit Om Sharan
- Farah Khan as a dancer in the "Feeling Hot Hot" song
- Brahmchari as Mohan Joshi
- Viju Khote as Bombay Police Escort
- Amitabh Bachchan as Himself (Guest appearance)
- Remo Fernandes as Himself

== Soundtrack ==
The music was composed by Anand–Milind and Remo Fernandes and lyrics were penned by Sameer.

#	Title	Singer(s)
1	"Feeling Hot Hot Hot"	Sharon Prabhakar, Chorus
2	"Let's Do It"	Alisha Chinai, Chorus
3	"Didi Mere Karde Kshama"	Alka Yagnik
4	"Iss Jadu Ke Dande Main"	Remo, Alka Yagnik & Chorus
5	"Pack That Smack"	Remo
6	"Teda Meda Main"	Remo
7	"Dekho Dekho Yeh Hai Jalwa"	Remo
