= Section 375 =

2019 Indian film directed by Ajay Bahl

- Theatrical release poster
- Directed by: Ajay Bahl
- Written by: Manish Gupta; Ajay Bahl
- Produced by: Kumar Mangat Pathak; Abhishek Pathak
- Starring: Akshaye Khanna; Richa Chadha; Meera Chopra
- Cinematography: Sudhir K. Chaudhary
- Edited by: Praveen Angre
- Music by: Clinton Cerejo
- Production companies: Panorama Studios; SCIPL
- Distributed by: Panorama Studios International; PVR Pictures; Anand Pandit Motion Pictures
- Release date: 13 September 2019
- Running time: 124 minutes
- Country: India
- Language: Hindi
- Box office: est. ₹12.35 crore

Section 375: Marzi Ya Zabardasti? (transl. Section 375: Will or Force?), better known simply as Section 375, is a 2019 Indian Hindi-language courtroom drama film directed by Ajay Bahl, written by Manish Gupta and produced by Kumar Mangat Pathak and Abhishek Pathak. It is based on Section 375 of the Indian Penal Code. The film stars Akshaye Khanna, Richa Chadha, Meera Chopra, and Rahul Bhat. Principal photography began in January 2019.

The film was theatrically released in India on 13 September 2019.

== Plot ==
Notable film director Rohan Khurana is arrested and convicted by a sessions court after assistant costume designer Anjali Dangle accuses him of rape. In the High Court, senior criminal barrister Tarun Saluja works to punch holes in the accuser's claims. Hiral Gandhi, a fervent lawyer fighting her first major case and a former trainee of Saluja, serves as the prosecutor representing the victim. Tarun operates by the principle that "law is a fact, justice is abstract," believing that a lawyer should remain emotionally detached from a case. In a flashback to a seminar attended by Hiral, Tarun surmises that the pursuit of justice is merely a career opportunity for the defense, prosecution, and judges alike, summarizing his worldview with the line, "We're in the business of law, not of justice." This stands completely contrary to Hiral's passionate desire to deliver absolute justice, an ideological difference that had previously forced her to quit Tarun's law firm.

During his cross-examinations, Tarun exposes tampered evidence, fabrications, and hidden facts among the key witnesses. He proposes that Anjali and Rohan engaged in a consensual relationship that initially began under the pressure of retaining her job but evolved into an emotional involvement for her. When Anjali realized that Rohan was only interested in a physical relationship and had no intention of marrying her, a major argument ensued. Rohan belittled her, threatened her career, and threw her out of his secondary apartment where they conducted the affair. Tarun notes that after a couple of days, Anjali apologized to Rohan, they rekindled their relationship, and later that same day, she reported the encounter to the police as a rape.

Insisting the case is simply an affair gone sour, Tarun points out that the law does not classify consensual physical relations as rape. Hiral counters that even if a couple shared prior consensual intimacy, any subsequent sexual encounter without explicit consent constitutes rape. The case directly disputes the legal provisions of Section 375 of the Indian Penal Code, which defines the strict conditions of the offense.

The two presiding judges find themselves in a difficult position; the circumstantial evidence strongly indicates that Anjali filed the case to avenge her personal humiliation, yet there is a powerful public perception that rich, influential citizens are exploiting the underprivileged. Deliberating in their chambers, the judges realize that ruling in favor of Rohan would damage their professional credentials. Observing furious anti-Rohan protests escalating outside the courthouse, the bench ultimately delivers a verdict heavily influenced by public sentiment.

While the bench acknowledges the legal merit of Tarun's defense, popular opinion forces them to strictly adhere to the letter of the law. The judges uphold the sessions court conviction, ruling that in the absence of definitive physical evidence regarding consent or force for this specific incident, the statement of the victim remains paramount evidence. Following the verdict, Rohan's wife, Kainaz, abandons him, refusing to support him any further. While Tarun promises a devastated Rohan that they will immediately appeal the conviction in the Supreme Court of India, Rohan is taken into custody. In the aftermath, a triumphant Anjali privately confesses to Hiral that Tarun's courtroom timeline was entirely accurate and that she fabricated the rape charge purely for revenge. Stunned by the revelation, Hiral later attends a dinner hosted by Tarun's family, where Tarun reminds her once more that they are in the business of law, not of justice—a principle she now fully understands.

== Cast ==
- Akshaye Khanna as Advocate Tarun Saluja, defence barrister of the accused
- Richa Chadha as Advocate Hiral Gandhi, the public prosecutor
- Meera Chopra as Anjali Vasudev Dangle
- Rahul Bhat as Rohan Ravi Khurana
- Shriswara as Kainaz Khurana, Rohan's wife
- Sandhya Mridul as Shilpa Saluja, Tarun's wife
- Kruttika Desai as Justice Indrani
- Kishor Kadam as Justice Madgaonkar
- Annuup Choudhari as Pramod Dangle, Anjali's brother
- Tanuka Laghate as Meera Singh
- Kshama Ninave as Mrs. Dangle, Anjali's mother
- Nishank Verma as Shekhar
- Karran Jeet as Hiral's husband
- Riva Arora as Roshini, Tarun's daughter

== Marketing and release ==
The first poster of the film was released by its makers on 7 August 2019. On 5 September, a dialogue promo presenting Khanna was released.

The film was premiered at Singapore South Asian International Film Festival (SgSAIFF) on 7 September 2019. It was closing film of the festival and received appreciation. The film was theatrically released in India on 13 September 2019.

== Reception ==
=== Critical response ===
On review aggregator website Rotten Tomatoes, the film holds a rating of 64% based on 11 reviews, with an average rating of 7/10.

Sreeparna Sengupta of The Times of India gave the film four stars out of five, praising screenplay, dialogues and performance of Akshaye Khanna, Richa Chadha, Rahul Bhat and Kishor Kadam, noted that the film made for a 'gripping watch with a crisp runtime and top-notch performances'. Concluding she wrote, "Overall, Section 375 is an audacious effort. It is a relevant film that tackles a complex issue and one that will engage, inform and open up debates." Trade analyst and critic Taran Adarsh gave the film four stars out of five, tagged it as "Powerful" and praised the performance of Akshaye Khanna, Richa Chadha, writing and direction. He opined, "A relevant film that raises pertinent points... Recommended!" Udita Jhunjhunwala of Firstpost gave three and half stars out of five and opined that it was the cinematography and editing that kept the film moving at desirable pace and in mood. Praising Manish Gupta's writing, she concluded that the film neither took a shrill, moralistic stand, nor caved to 'Bollywood-ised courtroom hysteria', rather it stuck to a highly charged narrative that deftly examined both sides of the case and deferred to the rule of law.

Devesh Sharma reviewing for Filmfare rates the film with three stars out of five. He wrote that the film was a 'well-crafted', 'well-acted' film with pithy and witty dialogues. He praised performance of Khanna and Chadha, but criticising the climax, concluded, "This criminal twist at the very end undoes all the good done by the film and leaves you with a bitter taste in the mouth. The director is trying to be too clever here but this cleverness eats away into the nobility of the film." Manjusha Radhakrishnan of Gulf News gave three and half stars out of five, concurring in praising lead cast she wrote, "Both Khanna and Chadha are in top form as warring legal counsels". She also praised the editing of the film and noted that film was off-beat, but concurring with Sharma she felt that the second half was made 'frustratingly convenient'. Concluding she opined, "While you may not be thrilled at where the film is headed, the right thing to do is to give the searing Section 375 a fair trial." Writing for News18, Rajeev Masand termed the film as an 'unmistakably compelling courtroom drama' and rated it with three and half stars out of five. He noted that director Ajay Bahl and writer Manish Gupta have made a 'sharp, thought-provoking drama' which is topical and conscious of the situation prevailing. Concluding, he opined, "It’s a well-made film with a persuasive argument that is nevertheless disturbing."

=== Box office ===
Section 375 collected ₹14.5 million (US$150,000) on the opening day, and ₹30.7 million (US$320,000) on the second day, whereas the third day collection was ₹35.2 million (US$370,000), taking its total opening weekend collection to ₹80.4 million (US$830,000).

As of 19 September 2019, the film has a collection of ₹153 million (US$1.6 million) in India.

== See also ==
- False accusation of rape
- Shiney Ahuja
- Dafaa 302
- Article 15
- Aligarh (film)
- Vaashi (2022 Film)
- Primal Fear (1996 film)
