= Aakrosh (2010 film) =

2010 Indian film by Priyadarshan

- Theatrical release poster
- Directed by: Priyadarshan
- Screenplay by: Robin Bhatt; Akash Khurana
- Dialogues by: Aditya Dhar
- Produced by: Kumar Mangat Pathak
- Starring: Ajay Devgn; Akshaye Khanna; Bipasha Basu; Paresh Rawal; Reema Sen
- Cinematography: Tirru
- Edited by: Arun Kumar
- Music by: Songs: Pritam; Score: Ouseppachan
- Production companies: Big Screen Entertainment; Zee Motion Pictures
- Distributed by: Zee Motion Pictures; Eros International
- Release date: 15 October 2010
- Running time: 146 minutes
- Country: India
- Language: Hindi
- Budget: ₹380 million
- Box office: ₹194 million

Aakrosh (transl. Outrage) is a 2010 Indian Hindi-language crime thriller film directed by Priyadarshan and produced by Kumar Mangat Pathak under the banner of Big Screen Entertainment. It stars Ajay Devgn, Akshaye Khanna, Bipasha Basu, Paresh Rawal and Reema Sen. The film was based on news reports of honour killings in India, and has also been described as a remake of the 1988 American film Mississippi Burning by Alan Parker (based on the 1964 Murders of Chaney, Goodman, and Schwerner). It was released on 15 October 2010, and performed poorly at the box office.

== Plot ==
The film opens during the Dussehra celebration in Jhanjhar village. Amidst the festivities, three young boys—Dinu, Gautam, and Dhiresh—escape in a car, pursued by another vehicle. The chase is abruptly halted when a police jeep blocks their path.

Two months later, the three friends from Delhi, all medical students, are officially reported missing from Jhanjhar village, with no leads on their disappearance. Following intense media scrutiny and student protests, the government orders a Central Bureau of Investigation (CBI) inquiry. CBI officers Siddhant Chaturvedi and Pratap Kumar are assigned to the case. They immediately face institutional resistance, discovering that the local police and authorities are deeply embedded in Shool Sena, a powerful, government-backed organization supported by the Home Minister and involved in illicit activities. The officers must also contend with Superintendent of Police (SP) Ajatshatru Singh IPS, a ruthless and powerful officer who misuses his authority. The investigation is further hampered by the lack of cooperation from the fearful local populace.

Siddhant and Pratap first investigate Rukamal, Dinu's brother-in-law. The next day, Rukamal is kidnapped by the goons, and no one in the village dares to speak out. Soon after, the CBI officers' rented room is attacked by Shool Sena goons. Days later, Rukamal is thrown, severely injured, from a moving van in the main market area.

The case gets a break when the water level of the local dam gets lowered, revealing a dumped car in the riverbed. Further investigation leads the officers to Kishore (alias "Nasbandhi"), a local wood seller and known hitman. They also recover a mobile phone, which is traced to Roshni, the daughter of local don (Bahubali) Thakur Omkar Sukul. During interrogation, Roshni reveals she was in love with Dinu. She confirms that she was with the three friends on the Dussehra night and tried to escape with them in their car to Delhi as her family was against her relationship. She states that SP Ajatshatru took the boys into custody, and her father took her away.

Meanwhile, Pratap motivates the village's lower-caste community to protest against the atrocities committed against them and demand answers about Dinu's disappearance. In response, SP Ajatshatru uses the local administration to incite chaos and riots. Under the cover of darkness, the goons burn down the homes of the protesting villagers, forcing many to flee. The court reprimands the CBI officers and orders them to close the investigation.

In a flashback, it is revealed that SP Ajatshatru's wife, Geeta, was Pratap's former girlfriend. Her father, who was also Pratap's teacher, forced them to end their relationship due to caste differences. In the present, Pratap emotionally and morally persuades Geeta to help the CBI fight against the injustice. She discloses that the three friends were taken to SP Ajatshatru's house that night, where they were murdered by the Bahubali and his associates. Following her lead, the officers recover the three bodies from the jungle.

When Ajatshatru discovers that his wife Geeta has been cooperating with the CBI, he brutally assaults her with a belt behind closed doors, leaving her hospitalized. Enraged, Pratap attempts to confront Ajatshatru, but Siddhant intervenes, arguing that Pratap's personal vendetta would jeopardize the investigation. The confrontation escalates into a physical fight, during which Siddhant initially restrains himself before overpowering Pratap and ultimately pointing a gun at him. He threatens to shoot if Pratap compromises the case, while promising that Pratap will get his chance for revenge. Acknowledging that his own by-the-book investigative approach has failed, Siddhant hands over the lead to Pratap. Afterward, Pratap asks a fellow officer whether Siddhant would actually have pulled the trigger, to which the officer replies that he certainly would have. The CBI then hacks the gang members' phones by luring one of them with a fake lucky-draw prize and covertly records their conversations using CCTV surveillance, allowing them to identify the weakest link among the accomplices. They subsequently stage a fake attack to rescue Kishore, one of the men involved in burying the victims' bodies, earning his trust and persuading him to become a government witness.

All the accused, including Ajatshatru and his associates, are arrested. When it is Ajatshatru's turn, Pratap tracks him down at a barber shop, locks the doors, and brutally beats him in revenge for Geeta's assault.

At trial, all the accused are convicted and sentenced to prison terms ranging from three to ten years. As they emerge from the courthouse to a crowd welcoming them with garlands and celebratory slogans, Siddhant discreetly slips a revolver to Jamunia, Dinu's sister. She uses it to shoot and kill all of the convicted men.

In the final scene, Siddhant and Pratap bid each other farewell at a railway station. As Pratap boards his train, Geeta runs onto the platform after him while Siddhant watches from a distance.

== Cast ==
- Ajay Devgan as Major Pratap Kumar
- Akshaye Khanna as CBI Officer Siddhant Chaturvedi
- Bipasha Basu as Geeta Singh, Pratap's former lover and Ajatshatru's wife.
- Reema Sen as Jamunia, Geeta's domestic help
- Paresh Rawal as Superintendent of Police Ajatshatru Singh Patel, Geeta's husband.
- Jaideep Ahlawat as Pappu Tiwari
- Pankaj Tripathi as Kishore
- Ashraful Haq as Hukum Lal
- Sameera Reddy in a special appearance in the song "Isak Se Meetha Kuch Bhi"
- Swapnil Kotriwar as Dinu
- Kanchan Pagare as Hawaldar Ramkhelavan Tripathi "Natey"
- Vineet Sharma as CBI Officer

== Music ==
Aakrosh

Soundtrack album by Pritam Chakraborty
- Released: 19 September 2010
- Genre: Feature film soundtrack
- Length: 41:27
- Label: T-Series
- Producer: Bhushan Kumar

Pritam Chakraborty chronology
Crook: It's Good To Be Bad (2010)	Aakrosh (2010)	Golmaal 3 (2010)

The music is composed by Pritam. The background score is composed by Malayalam composer Ouseppachan.

All lyrics are written by Irshad Kamil.

Aakrosh (Original Motion Picture Soundtrack)
No.	Title	Singer(s)	Length
1.	"Isak Se Meetha Kuch Bhi"	Ajay Jhingran, Kalpana Patowary	5:21
2.	"Saude Baazi"	Anupam Amod	5:56
3.	"Man Ki Mat Pe Mat Chaliyo"	Rahat Fateh Ali Khan	4:15
4.	"Isak Se Meetha Kuch Bhi" (Dhol Mix)	Ajay Jhingran, Kalpana Patowary	5:19
5.	"Sasural Munia Rato Ko Piya"	Shreya Ghoshal	5:09
6.	"Ramkatha Ye Harlegi Sakal"	Sukhwinder Singh	5:00
7.	"Isak Se Meetha Kuch Bhi" (Remix Version)	Ajay Jhingran, Kalpana Patowary	4:33
8.	"Saude Baazi" (Encore)	Javed Ali, Anupam Amod	5:54
Total length:			41:27

== Reception ==
Preeti Arora from Rediff.com gave the film 3.5 stars out of 5, praising the performances, cinematography and the unpredictability, while also feeling the action sequences, although important, could have been a little less exaggerated to retain the realistic air of the film.

== Awards and nominations ==
Award	Category	Recipients and nominees	Result
Stardust Awards	Best Actress in a Thriller or Action	Bipasha Basu	Nominated
Zee Cine Awards	Best Actor in a Negative Role	Paresh Rawal	Nominated
