= List of Sahitya Akademi Translation Prize winners for Tamil =

List of winners of a literary honor in India

Part of a series on

Sahitya Akademi Awards
Category
Sahitya Akademi Award winners by language
- Assamese
- Bengali
- Bodo
- Dogri
- English
- Gujarati
- Hindi
- Kannada
- Kashmiri
- Konkani
- Maithili
- Malayalam
- Marathi
- Meitei (Manipuri)
- Nepali
- Odia
- Punjabi
- Rajasthani
- Sanskrit
- Santali
- Sindhi
- Tamil
- Telugu
- Urdu
Sahitya Akademi Translation Prizes
- Assamese
- Bengali
- Bodo
- Dogri
- English
- Gujarati
- Hindi
- Kannada
- Kashmiri
- Konkani
- Maithili
- Malayalam
- Marathi
- Meitei (Manipuri)
- Nepali
- Odia
- Punjabi
- Rajasthani
- Sanskrit
- Santali
- Sindhi
- Tamil
- Telugu
- Urdu
Sahitya Akademi Yuva Puraskar
- Assamese
- Bengali
- Bodo
- Dogri
- English
- Gujarati
- Hindi
- Kannada
- Kashmiri
- Konkani
- Maithili
- Malayalam
- Meitei (Manipuri)
- Marathi
- Nepali
- Odia
- Punjabi
- Rajasthani
- Sanskrit
- Santali
- Sindhi
- Tamil
- Telugu
- Urdu
Sahitya Akademi Bal Sahitya Puraskar
- Assamese
- Bengali
- Bodo
- Dogri
- English
- Gujarati
- Hindi
- Kannada
- Kashmiri
- Konkani
- Maithili
- Malayalam
- Meitei (Manipuri)
- Marathi
- Nepali
- Odia
- Punjabi
- Rajasthani
- Sanskrit
- Santali
- Sindhi
- Tamil
- Telugu
- Urdu
Related
- Eighth Schedule to the Constitution of India
- Official Languages Commission
- List of languages by number of native speakers in India

Sahitya Akademi Translation Prizes are given each year to writers for their outstanding translations work in the 24 languages, since 1989.

== Recipients ==
Following is the list of recipients of Sahitya Akademi translation prizes for their works written in Tamil. The award, as of 2019, consisted of ₹50,000.

Year	Translator	Title of the translation	Original Title	Original Language	Genre	Original Author	References
1989	M.G. Jagannatharaja	Aamukta Malyada	Amuktamalyada	Telugu	Poetic Prose	Krishnadevaraya	
1990	T. B. Siddalingaiah	Mannum Manitharum	Marali Mannige	Kannada	Novel	Shivaram Karanth	
1991	K. S. Srinivasacharya	Yayathi	Yayathi	Marathi	Novel	V. S. Khandekar	
1992	K. Venkatachalam	Mouna Olam	Vaisakha	Kannada	Novel	Chaduranga	
1993	Saraswathi Ramnath	Indhiya Mozhi Natakangal	Collection	Different languages	Collection	Various authors	
1994	Kurinjivelan	Vishakanni	Visha Kanya	Malayalam	Novel	S. K. Pottekkatt	
1995	P. Bhanumathi	Meethi Charithram	Baaki Itihas	Bengali	Play	Badal Sircar	
1996	T. S. Raju	Mangiyathor Nilavinile	Adh Chanini Raat	Punjabi	Novel	Gurdial Singh	
1997	T. S. Sadasivam	Chandragiri Attrangaraiyil	Chandragiriya Threeradalli	Kannada	Novel	Sara Abubakkar	
1998	Rudra. Thulasidas (A) Ilambharati	Mayyazhi Karaiyoram	Mayazipuzhaiyade Theerangalil	Malayalam	Novel	M. Mukundan	
1999	Tamilnadan	Ezhu Cartoonugalum Oru Vanna Oviyamum	Collection	Oria	Short stories	Hrushikesh Panda	
2000	Sirpi Balasubramaniam	Agnisakshi	Agnisakshi	Malayalam	Novel	Lalithambika Antharjanam	
2001	Lakshmi Narayan Sona Ropa Warq	Enathu Ninaivalaikal	Muhinji Hayati-a-Ja Hiranandani	Sindhi	Autobiography	Popati R.	
2002	H. Balasubramaniam	Phaniswaranath Renu Kathaikal	Phaniswaranath Renu Ki Shreshtha Kahaniyan	Hindi	Short stories	Phanishwar Nath Renu	
2003	Neela Padmanabhan	Ayyappa Panikkarin Kavithaigal	Ayyappa Panikkerude Krithikal	Malayalam	Poetry	Ayyappa Paniker	
2004	Paavannan	Paruvam	Parva	Kannada	Novel	S. L. Bhyrappa	
2005	Pa. Krishnaswamy	Chidambara Rahasiyam	Chidambara Rahasya	Kannada	Novel	Poornachandra Tejaswi	
2006	Puviarasu	Puratchikaran	Selection	Bengali	Poetry	Kazi Nazrul Islam	
2007	A.I. Ravi Armugam	Savitir: Idayathai Allum Irava Kaaviyam (2 Vols.)	Savitri	English	Poetry	Sri Aurobindo	
2008	Pa. Anandakumar	lyandiram	Yantram	Malayalam	Novel	Malayattur Ramakrishnan	
2009	Bhuvana Natarajan	Muthal Sabatham	Prothom Protishruti	Bengali	Novel	Ashapurna Devi	
2010	Nirmaiya	Umar: Sengol Illamal Kreedam Illamal	Chenkol Illathe Kreedam Illathe	Malayalam	Novel	Nooranad Haneef	
2011	lndiran	Paravaigal Oruvelai Thoongi Poyierukkalam	Thare Khali Daki Dela	Oria	Play	Manorama Biswal Mahapatra	
2012	G. Nanjundan	Akkaa	Akkaa	Kannada	Short stories	Various Kannada Women Writers	
2013	Iraiyadiyan (Dass)	Avadeshwari	Avadeshwari	Kannada	Novel	Shankar Mokashi Punekar	
2014	S. Devadoss	Ladakkilirundu Kavizhum Nizhal	Shadow from Ladakh	English	Novel	Bhabani Bhattacharya	
2015	Gowri Kirubanandan	Meetchi	Vimuktha	Telugu	Short stories	Volga	
2016	Poornachandran	Poruppumikka Manitharkal	Serious Men	English	Novel	Manu Joseph	
2017	Yuma Vasuki	Kacaakkin Itikaacam	Khasakkinte Itihasam	Malayalam	Novel	O. V. Vijayan	
2018	Colachel Mu. Yoosuf	Tirutan Maniyanpillai	Manian Pillaiyuda Athma Katha	Malayalam	Autobiography	G. R. Indugopan	
2019	K. V. Jeyasri	Nilam Poothu Malarntha Naal	Nilam Poothu Malarnna Naal	Malayalam	Novel	Manoj Kuroor	
2020	K. Chellappan	Gora	Gora	Bengali	Novel	Rabindranath Tagore	
2021	Maalan (V. Narayanan)	Oru Pinanthookkiyin Varalaatru Kurippugal	Chronicle of a Corpse Bearer	English	Novel	Cyrus Mistry	
2022	K. Nallathambi	Yaad Vashem	Yaad Vashem	Kannada	Novel	Nemichandra	
2023	Kannaiyan Daksnamurthy	Karunkundram	The Black Hill	English	Novel	Mamang Dai	

== See also ==
- List of Sahitya Akademi Award winners for Tamil
