= Baala Bandana =

1971 film

- VCD cover
- Directed by: Peketi Sivaram
- Screenplay by: Peketi Sivaram
- Based on: Jog Biyog by Ashapurna Devi
- Produced by: A. L. Srinivasan
- Starring: Rajkumar; Jayanthi
- Cinematography: V. Selvaraj
- Edited by: V. P. Krishnan, R. Shanmugham
- Music by: G. K. Venkatesh
- Production company: ALS Productions
- Release date: 1971
- Running time: 164 minutes
- Country: India
- Language: Kannada

Baala Bandhana ( transl. Bonding of a life time) is a 1971 Indian Kannada language drama film, directed by Peketi Sivaram. Starring Rajkumar and Jayanthi, the film was a remake of 1953 Bengali film Jog Biyog, which was based on the novel of the same name by Ashapurna Devi.

Jog Biyog was earlier remade in Tamil as Padikkadha Medhai, in Telugu as Aatma Bandhuvu and in Hindi as Mehrban. Though the Kannada version was hit, it could not meet the success of the Tamil and Telugu remake versions of the same Bengali movie.

== Plot ==
Orphaned as an infant, Ranga (played by Rajkumar) is brought up by his distant relative Chandrashekhar Rao Bahadur (Sampath) and his compassionate wife Parvathi (M Jayashree).

Chandrashekhar Rao heads a large family of three sons Ramnatha (Vajramuni), Somanatha (Bengaluru Nagesh) and Vishwantha (Dwarakish), two daughters, the widowed Rajamma (Lakshmi Devi), their young children and Rajamma’ son. Parvathi promises her childhood friend Mayakka that she will take her daughter Lakshmi (Jayanthi) as her third daughter-in-law but ends up giving her in marriage to Ranga when her third son (he is in love with Lepakshi (B Jaya) refuses to marry her.

Life takes a cruel turn for Chandrashekhar Rao when he loses all his wealth in share market. His daughter's marriage is called off, his sons attitude change and he is forced to send Ranga and Lakshmi out. He dies heartbroken. Ranga with the help of Kotaiah (Balakrishna) finds a job in a factory owned by Rachappa (Mahadevappa) whose son is to have married Geetha. How Ranga sets right the turmoil in the family and reunites them forms rest of the story.

== Cast ==
- Rajkumar as Ranga
- Jayanthi
- Sampath as Chandrashekhar Rao
- Dwarakish
- T. N. Balakrishna
- Vajramuni
- Ganapathi Bhat
- M. Jayashree
- M. N. Lakshmi Devi
- Bangalore Nagesh
- B. Jaya

== Soundtrack ==
The music of the film was composed by G. K. Venkatesh and lyrics for the soundtrack written by Ku.Ra.Sitaramashashtry and Vijaya Narasimha. All the songs were received very well. The duet "Chinnadanta Naadige" became hugely popular upon release.

=== Track list ===
Title	Singer(s)
"Chinnadanta Naadige"	P. Susheela, P. B. Sreenivas
"Nijavanne Heluve Naanu"	P. B. Sreenivas
"Baachi Baithale"	P. B. Sreenivas
"Namma Mane"	P. Susheela
"Kalikeye Jaana"	P. Susheela
"Aapath Bandhava"	K. J. Yesudas
