= Ke Apon Ke Por (film) =

Bangladeshi film

- Ke Apon Ke Por (Film) poster
- Bengali: কে আপন কে পর
- Directed by: Shahin Sumon
- Produced by: Amit Hasan
- Starring: Amit Hasan; Apu Biswas; Alamgir; Farida Akhtar Babita
- Music by: Alam Khan
- Production company: Tele View
- Distributed by: RTV; Furti Entertainment (Digital Rights)
- Release date: 2 December 2011
- Country: Bangladesh
- Language: Bengali

Ke Apon Ke Por is a Bangladeshi film directed by Shahin-Sumon and produced by Amit Hasan under his Tele View Productions. It features Amit Hasan, Apu Biswas, Alamgir, Farida Akhtar Babita and Misha Sawdagor. Superstar Shakib Khan makes a special appearance. The film was a remake of 1990 Hindi film Swarg which was loosely based on 1967 movie Mehrban, which itself was a remake of the 1960 Tamil movie Padikkadha Medhai, which in turn was a remake of 1953 Bengali film Jog Biyog based on the novel of same name by Ashapoorna Devi.

Alamgir and Farida Akhtar Babita earned National Film Awards for their role in the film at the 36th Bangladesh National Film Awards.

== Cast ==
- Amit Hasan
- Apu Biswas
- Alamgir
- Farida Akhtar Babita
- Mizu Ahmed
- Misha Sawdagor
- Shakib Khan as (special appearance)

== Awards ==
National Film Awards (Bangladesh)

- Best Supporting Actor - Alamgir
- Best Supporting Actress - Babita
