= Swarg =

- Poster
- Directed by: David Dhawan
- Written by: Anees Bazmee
- Based on: Jog Biyog by Ashapurna Devi
- Produced by: Nandu G Tolani
- Starring: Rajesh Khanna; Govinda; Juhi Chawla; Madhavi
- Edited by: David Dhawan
- Music by: Songs: Anand–Milind; Lyrics: Sameer
- Distributed by: Paras Films International
- Release date: 18 May 1990
- Country: India
- Language: Hindi

Swarg (transl. Heaven) is a 1990 Indian Hindi-language drama film directed by David Dhawan, released in 1990. It stars Rajesh Khanna, Govinda, Juhi Chawla, Madhavi in lead roles. The film is loosely based on the 1967 film Mehrban starring Ashok Kumar and Sunil Dutt, which itself was a remake of the 1960 Tamil film Padikkadha Medhai which in turn was a remake of 1953 Bengali film Jog Biyog. based on the novel of same name by Ashapoorna Devi. Swarg was remade in Telugu as Indra Bhavanam, in Odia as Bhai Hela Bhagari, in Bengali as Annadata and in Nepali as Izzatadar, twice in Bangladesh as Sneher Protidhan and Ke Apon Ke Por (2011).

== Plot ==
Living in a luxurious mansion named Swarg, this is the story of Mr. Kumar, or Sahabji(a Hindi word for 'lord' or 'master'), a rich businessman and landowner. His family consists of his wife, sister Jyoti, two brothers, Vicky and Ravi, and a sister-in-law. He also has a loyal servant, Krishna, who considers the former akin to a father.

Sahabji has a clash of ideals with Dhanraj, an immoral businessman, regarding a business matter, and Sahabji dissolves the venture. In vengeance, Dhanraj schemes with Sahabji's two brothers to usurp Sahabji's wealth and businesses. He sets fire to Sahabji's factory, citing a short circuit as the reason, and takes over the luxurious mansion and vast business empire, leaving Sahabji virtually penniless and devastated by the death of his wife. His brothers have now taken over the money, the mansion, and his business. When Krishna confronted the brothers of his master, he was instead brutally fired by Sahabji himself because he was charged with stealing Jyoti's necklace by Sahabji's brothers and sister-in-law. Later, he learns that Sahabji intentionally banished him so that he can do something better in life and not be held down by Sahabji's own misfortunes. Krishna moves to Bombay and meets a man called Chadda, or Airport, and they become friends. His hard work in the city makes him a popular film star, which enables him to accumulate enough wealth to make him a rich man on the scale of his former master, and he returns to his town after several years as a mysterious but wealthy businessman.

In the guise of a golden offer, Krishna sends Chadda to buy Sahabji's mansion, which is now owned by Dhanraj, for the price of 90 lakh INR (USD529,000), to which the greedy Dhanraj readily agrees and signs over the deeds of ownership of the land and the mansion, unaware of the buyer's actual identity. In the process of storing the cash payment in his personal vault, he is informed his own factory has mysteriously caught fire, causing him to hurry to the site in time to see his factory crumble to ashes. At this point, Krishna confronts him and reveals himself to be the mystery buyer, and also implicitly confesses to being responsible for the "accidental" fire, similar to the scheme Dhanraj perpetrated against Sahabji. Krishna then reminds Dhanraj of him selling the mansion for 90 lakh INR (USD529,000) and then rhetorically wonders what if Dhanraj were to lose that 90 lakh INR (USD529,000) as well. True enough, Dhanraj finds his safe empty of cash upon rushing back, effectively rendering him homeless and ruined.

Krishna then targets Sahabji's brothers by using their greed against them. Without revealing himself, he enters into a business deal with them and later cheats them out of their investments - similar to how they cheated their older brother out of his finances - that renders them penniless and desperate. At this point, Krishna reveals himself to them and informs them that it was all part of his plan to restore the lost wealth, glory, and fortune of his former master.

Krishna goes to a temple and prays to God so that he meets Sahabji very soon. Incidentally, he finds Sahabji in the same temple and gets to know that both Sahabji and Jyoti are in a pitiable condition. He brings them back to the mansion. Sahabji then witnesses his brothers inside the mansion and demands to know why they are there. Krishna reveals that they've paid for much more than they bid and were now totally homeless and ruined, and they had also realized their mistake, so he forgave them and brought them back to the mansion. Jyoti, Krishna, and the brothers ask for forgiveness of them (brothers) from Sahabji, which Sahabji outright refuses, after which their late mother's portrait falls from above, and Sahabji is reminded of the promise he made to her regarding taking care of his brothers no matter what. At this point, Sahabji suffers a cardiac arrest, caused by years of financial, physical, and emotional stress. He forgives his brothers. He also approves Jyoti and Krishna's relationship and gives his blessings to a marriage. With that, the patriarch dies, leaving all his inheritance to Krishna and Jyoti.

== Cast ==
- Rajesh Khanna as Kumar
- Govinda as Krishna
- Juhi Chawla as Jyoti
- Madhavi as Janki
- Paresh Rawal as Dhanraj
- Satish Kaushik as Chadda "Airport"
- Bharat Kapoor as Nagpal
- Raja Bundela as Vikram "Vicky"
- Dilip Dhawan as Ravi
- Neena Gupta as Naina
- Arun Bakshi as Film Director
- Mahesh Anand as Guru
- Yunus Parvez as Gardener
- Lilliput as Crippled Beggar on the Street
- Om Shivpuri as Himself
- N. Chandra as "Papaji" Director N. Chandra

== Music ==
Swarg

Studio album by Anand–Milind
- Released: 1990
- Genre: Feature film soundtrack
- Label: Venus Records & Tapes
- Producer: Anand–Milind

Anand–Milind chronology
Zahreelay (1990)	Swarg (1990)	Tum Mere Ho (1990)

The soundtrack of the film contains 5 songs. Lyrics were by Sameer and music was conducted by the duo Anand–Milind.

Song	Singer
"Bambai Humko Jam Gayi"	Amit Kumar
"Filmon Ke Sare Hero Mere Aage Hain Zero"	Amit Kumar, Nitin Mukesh
"Tum Sajna Ke Ghar Jaogi, Hamen Yaad Bahut Aaogi, Is Ghar, Is Angna Mein"	Amit Kumar, Mohammed Aziz, Anupama Deshpande
"Kaise Kate Din, Kaise Kate Raaten"	Mohammed Aziz, Anuradha Paudwal
"Ae Mere Dost Lautke Aaja"	Mohammed Aziz
