= Indra Bhavanam =

1991 Telugu film by Krishna

- Directed by: Krishna
- Written by: D. V. Narasa Raju (Dialogues)
- Screenplay by: Krishna
- Based on: Swarg (1990)
- Produced by: G. Narasimha Rao
- Starring: Krishna; Krishnam Raju; Meena; Kota Srinivasa Rao; Jyothi
- Cinematography: K. S. Hari
- Edited by: Krishna
- Music by: Bappi Lahiri
- Release date: 3 May 1991
- Country: India
- Language: Telugu

Indra Bhavanam is a 1991 Indian Telugu drama film written, edited and directed by Krishna who also enacted the lead character alongside Krishnam Raju, Meena, Jyothi and Kota Srinivasa Rao. Bappi Lahiri scored and composed the film's soundtrack album. The film is a remake of the 1990 Bollywood film Swarg which was loosely based on the 1967 film, Mehrban which was a remake of the 1960 Tamizh film Padikkadha Medhai which itself was a remake of the 1953 Bengali film Jog Biyog, the film adaptation of a novel named Jog Biyog by Ashapoorna Devi.

Krishna plays the role of a loyal and faithful servant who is treated as a younger brother by his master, enacted by Krishnam Raju. However, a set of unfortunate incidents triggered by some conniving relatives and a business rival forces Krishna to be thrown out and in due course, a downward spiral in the life and career of his master. How the servant proves his innocence and set things right forms the crux of the story.

== Cast ==
- Krishna as Krishna
- Krishnam Raju
- Meena
- Jyothi
- Lathashri
- Kota Srinivasa Rao
- Ahuti Prasad
- Sivaji Raja
- Dharmavarapu Subrahmanyam
- Subbaraya Sharma
- Prabhakar Reddy (Guest role)
- Peketi Sivaram (Guest role)

== Music ==
Bappi Lahiri scored and composed the film's soundtrack album.

- "Love Love" — Mano, Anuradha Paudwal
- "Tala Vakita" — Mano, Anuradha Paudwal
- "Pranamlo Pranama" — Mano, Anuradha Paudwal
- "Etu Choosina" — Mano, Anuradha Paudwal
- "Chikkali Chikkali" — Mano, Anuradha Paudwal
