= Annadata (2002 film) =

2002 Indian Bengali-language film

Annadaata
- Annadaata
- Directed by: Ravi Kinagi
- Written by: N. K. Salil (Dialogues)
- Screenplay by: Ravi Kinagi
- Story by: Ravi Kinagi
- Based on: Jog Biyog by Ashapurna Devi
- Produced by: Kusum Dhanuka
- Starring: Prosenjit Chatterjee; Sreelekha Mitra
- Cinematography: Dilip Roy
- Edited by: Biswanath Roy
- Music by: Babul Bose
- Distributed by: Eskay Movies
- Release date: 12 April 2002
- Country: India
- Language: Bengali

Annadaata (English: My Father) is a 2002 Bengali-language action drama film directed by Ravi Kinagi. It was produced by Ashok Dhanuka under the banner of Eskay Movies. The film stars Prosenjit Chatterjee, Abdur Razzak and Sreelekha Mitra in the lead roles. Music of the film was composed by Babul Bose. The film was a remake of 1990 Hindi film Swarg which was loosely based on the 1967 film Mehrban. The 1967 film itself was a remake of the Tamil movie Padikkadha Medhai (1960) which in turn was a remake of 1953 Bengali film Jog Biyog based on the novel of same name by Ashapoorna Devi.

== Cast ==
- Prasenjit Chatterjee as Shankar
- Sreelekha Mitra as Barsha
- Abdur Razzak as Amar Chowdhury
- Anuradha Ray as Shanti Dev
- Dulal Lahiri as Rudraprasad Sen
- Bharat Kaul as Vikram
- Rajesh Sharma as Film Director
- Siddhanta Mahapatra as Special appearance in an item song named "Dhekhi joto soundoro"

== Production ==
Initially Rituparna Sengupta was offered to play the role of Barsha. After she refused, Mouli Ganguly and then Rachna Banerjee were considered for the role. After both of them eschewed the role, it went to Sreelekha Mitra.

== Soundtrack ==
Annadata

Soundtrack album by Babul Bose
- Genre: Feature film soundtrack
- Length: 30:51
- Language: Bengali
- Label: Eskay Music
- Producer: Ashok Dhanuka

Official audio
- Annadata - Full Album on YouTube

The music of the film has been composed by Babul Bose.

No.	Song	Singer	Length
1	"Din Aase Din Jaye"	Kumar Sanu; Sadhana Sargam	5:10
2	"Hate Chabi Niye Bose"	Babul Supriyo	4:38
3	"Aaj Ami Eka"	Kumar Sanu	6:01
4	"Dekhi Jodi Sundari"	Udit Narayan	4:06
5	"Amader Katha Sudhu Mane Rekho"	Babul Supriyo; Sadhana Sargam; Deepa Narayan	5:38
6	"Cinemaye Ache Jato Hero"	Vinod Rathod	5:08
