= Bhuvana Natarajan =

Indian translator and short story writer

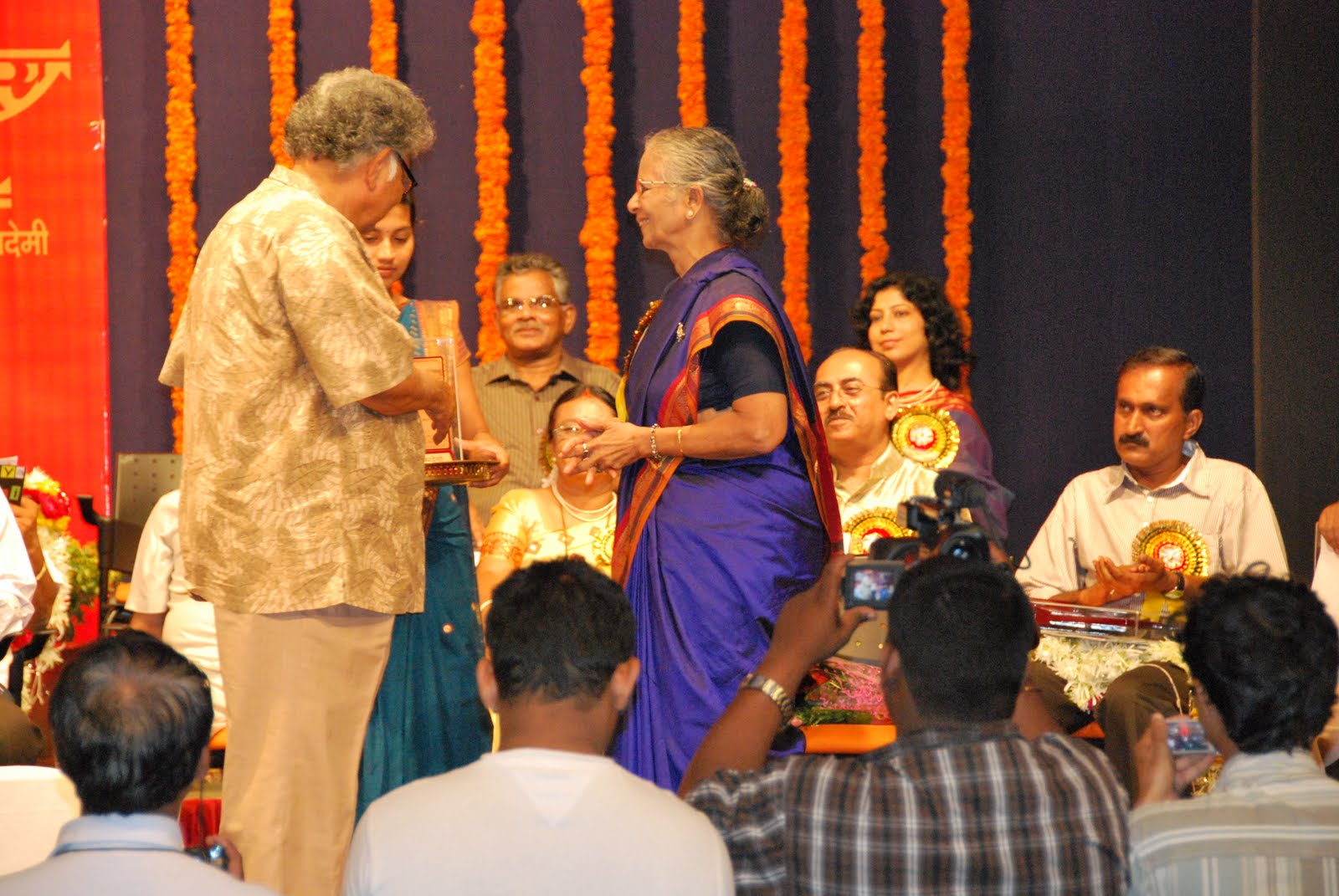
- Sahitya Academy

Bhuvana Natarajan was an Indian translator and short story writer. She published over 20 books and in 2009 was awarded the Sahitya Akademi Translation Prize for translation from Bengali to Tamil. Many of her short stories have appeared in Kalki, Mangaiyar Malar, Saavi, Sumangali, Jnana Bhoomi, Idhayam Pesugiraday and Gokulam. She was able to read, write and converse in Tamil, Bengali, Hindi, English and had working knowledge of Sanskrit. She lived in Calcutta for over 43 years and later in Chennai.

She attended the World Tamil Conference held in Tanjavur in 1995 as an observer representing Bharathi Tamizh Sangam, Calcutta.

== Awards ==
- Nalli Thisai Ettum Virudu for best translation from Bengali to Tamil for the year 2007;
- Tirupur Tamizh Sangam Award for best translation for the year 2007;
- Sahitya Akademi Translation Prize – for translation from Bengali to Tamil (Mudhal Sabadham) for 2009 (original work by Ashapoorna Devi).

== Works ==
Mudhal Sabadam or Prothom Protishruti (in Bengali), was written in Bengali by Ashapoorna Devi which was awarded the Jnanpith Award. This novel was later made into a movie.

=== Original works ===
- Mother Teresa
- Raja Ram Mohan Roy
- Netaji Subhas Chandra Bose

=== Translations ===
- Vangaala Sirukadhaigal – short stories of Ashapoorna Devi
- Sondha Mannai Thedi – Taslima Nasreen
- Gana Devatha – Tarashankar Bandopadhyay (Jnanpith award winner)
- Devadas – Sharat Chandra Chatterji
- Andhakkaalam – Sunil Gangopadhyay
- Jagmohanin Maranam – Mahasweta Devi
- Karuppu Sooriyan - Ashapoorna Devi
- Dharmamum Adharmam - Various (short story collection)
- En Thaikku En Kadaisi Namaskarangal - Santosh Kumar Ghosh
- Porattam - Sunil Gangopadhyay
- Vanga Mozhi Siru Kadhai Toguppu - Bibhutibhushan Bandopadhyay
- Oru Oliyin Maranam - Various (short story collection)
- Magizhamnu Manam - Various (short story collection)
- Ganadevata - Tarashankar Bandopadhyay
