= Kishore Namit Kapoor =

Indian actor, author and acting teacher (born 1949)

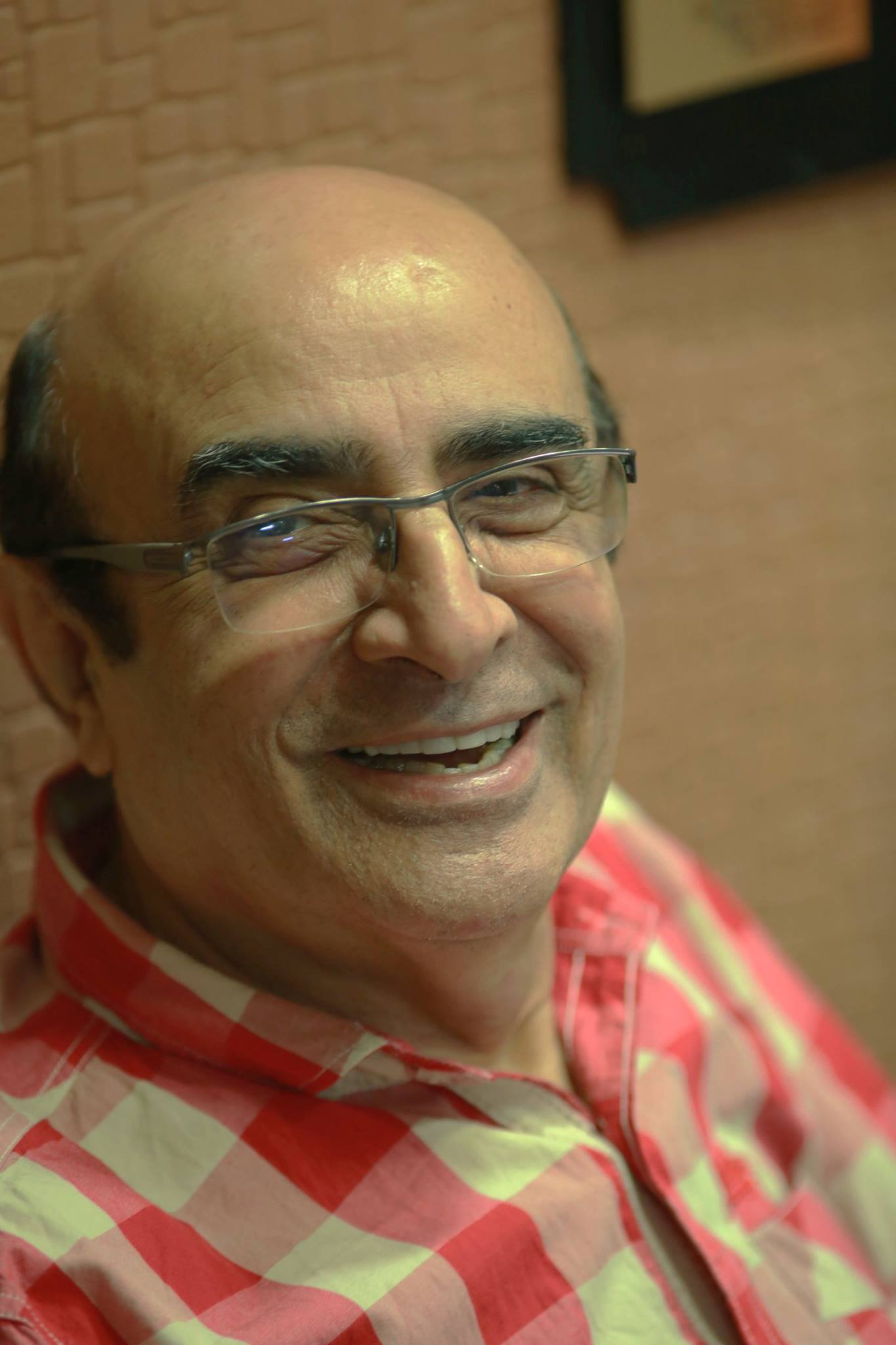
- Kishore Namit Kapoor, actor and acting trainer based in Mumbai, India
- Born: 28 July 1949 (age 77); Delhi, India
- Occupations: Actor, author, acting trainer

Kishore Namit Kapoor (born 1949) is an Indian actor, author and acting teacher. He has trained some of the most prominent film and television actors of the Indian industry including Allu Arjun, Ravi Mohan ,Hrithik Roshan, Priyanka Chopra, Kareena Kapoor, Ranveer Singh and Vicky Kaushal.

His books on acting, "You Are The Instrument, You Are The Player" and "Acting in Everyday Life" were published in 2003 and 2012 respectively.

== Early life and education ==
Kishore Namit Kapoor was born in Delhi in post-independence India. In 1958, he joined All India Radio (AIR) as a child artist. When Doordarshan, India's first public service broadcaster, began telecasting live plays in 1962, Kapoor was one of the first child actors to feature in their weekly plays.

He joined K.M. College in 1964, which was prominent in Delhi as the alumni institute of Amitabh Bachchan, Kulbushan Kharbanda and Dinesh Thakur. At Abhyaan, a Delhi theatre group of the time, Kapoor acted in various plays with director Rajendra Nath.

After completing a Masters in Philosophy from Hindu College, Delhi, Kapoor joined the Film and Television Institute of India (FTII) in 1970. After completing the course, he moved to Mumbai.

== Career ==
Kapoor acted in several films between 1972 and 1991. Aakrant and Sweekar released in 1973. He acted with Amitabh Bachchan and Sanjeev Kumar in Farar (1975) and with Manoj Kumar in Kranti (1981). He also acted in the first full-length television feature film made in India – P. Kumar Vasudev's Guru (1975).

In television, he was the lead in Pratham Pratishruti, telecast on Doordarashan in 1990 and based on the book by Ashapurna Devi. With Sharukh Khan, he acted in Umeed (1989).

He briefly returned to acting in a short film A Trip to Egypt (2014).

In 1983, he founded his own training academy for film and television actors. Over the last three decades, he has trained some of the most prominent actors of this industry.

== Personal life ==
Kapoor has four children. His eldest son, Kabira Namit, acted with him in A Trip To Egypt. His younger son, Bahaish Kapoor, is a short film director, cinematographer and composer.

== Filmography ==
- 1992: Nishchaiy
- 1991: Sajan
- 1990: Sailaab
- 1989: Paap Ka Ant
- 1989: Taaqatwar
- 1987: Vishaal
- 1986: Love 86
- 1985: Sarfarosh
- 1984: Phulwari
- 1983: Sun Meri Laila
- 1982: Ashanti
- 1982: Sun Sajna
- 1981: Commander
- 1981: Armaan
- 1981: Kranti
- 1980: Sitara
- 1979: Zulm Ki Pukaar
- 1976: Sajjo Rani
- 1976: Aarambh
- 1975: Faraar
- 1973: Sweekar
- 1973: Aakrant
