= Odakkuzhal =

Odakkuzhal may refer to:

- Odakkuzhal (film), a 1975 Indian Malayalam-language film
- Odakkuzhal (poetry collection), a collection of poems by G. Sankara Kurup
- Odakkuzhal Award, an Indian literary award
