= Poornachandran =

G. Poornachandran
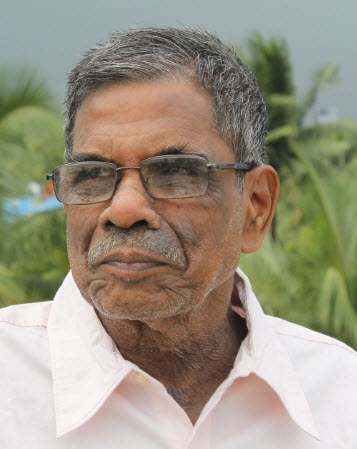
- Born: 1949 (age 76–77); Arcot, Tamil Nadu, India
- Occupations: Writer, critic, translator, professor
- Spouse: Selvanayagi
- Writing career
- Language: Tamil
- Subjects: Literature, translation, criticism
- Notable awards: Sahitya Akademi Translation Prize (2016); Anantha Vikatan Award (2011 & 2016); Ilakkiya Mamani Award (2022)
- Website: poornachandran.com

G. Poornachandran is a Tamil writer from India. He was born in Arcot in 1949, worked as a Tamil professor in Bishop Heber College, Tiruchirappalli and an emeritus professor in Pondicherry University. He is currently living in Chennai. He has written many books on the subjects of Tamil literary criticism and has translated several books from English to Tamil. He won the Sahitya Akademi Translation Prize in 2016 for his translation of the fiction Serious Men by Manu Joseph into Tamil as "Poruppumikka Manidargal" (பொறுப்புமிக்க மனிதர்கள்). He is also a recipient of Anantha Vikatan awards for translation in 2011 and 2016. He also received the Ilakkiya Mamani Award for 2022 from the Chief Minister of Tamil Nadu, M.K. Stalin.
He has written 11 books, majorly based on literary criticism and western contemporary theories, and has translated 37 books on variety of subjects and genres from English to Tamil. He has also published 4 books and has written a lot of essays in the little magazines such as Kalachuvadu, Nigazh, Tamil Neyam. He is one of the first persons to conduct Badal Sircar Theatrical Workshop in Tiruchirappalli in 1989. He had been an influential person in Tiruchi Cine-forum and Tiruchi Readers-forum and had developed an interest on art films and serious book reading in many of his students. He is actively writing essays and articles in his website www.poornachandran.com which shall help the students on their academics and the others to think on the contemporary issues faced by the society on various fields. He is also running an endowment on his name through which he has been conducting regular workshops for the students on the subjects of literature and criticism.

== Books he has written ==
1. அமைப்புமைய வாதமும், பின்னமைப்புவாதமும் (An Introduction to Structuralism and Post-structuralism, Published by Adaiyaalam)
2. பத்திரிகை, தலையங்கம், கருத்துரை (How to write Editorials and Opinions in Newspapers and Journals. published by Tamil Literary Society, Tiruchirappalli)
3. தொடர்பியல் கொள்கைகள் (Contemporary Communication Theories, his own publication)
4. தமிழிலக்கியத் திறனாய்வு வரலாறு (1980வரை) - (History of Tamil Literary Criticism from 1900 to 1980, published by the Tamil University, Thanjavur)
5. இந்திய மொழிகள் ஓர் அறிமுகம் (An Introduction to Indian Languages and Literatures, published by Agaram Pathippagam, Thanjavur)
6. நவீன மொழிபெயர்ப்புக் கோட்பாடுகள் (Modern Theories of Translation, published by Agaram pathippagam, Thanjavur)
7. இலக்கியப் பயணத்தில் சில எதிர்ப்பாடுகள் (A few Encounters in Tamil Literary Journey, published by Agaram Pathippagam, Thanjavur)
8. கவிதையியல் (Modern Tamil Poetic Theories, published by the International Institute of Tamil Studies, Chennai)
9. கதையியல் (Theories on Fictional Writing, Published by Adaiyaalam)
10. கவிதைமொழி தகர்ப்பும் அமைப்பும் (Construction and Deconstruction in Tamil poetry, Author's own publication)
11. தமிழ் இலக்கியத்தில் மேற்கத்தியக் கொள்கைகளின் தாக்கம் (Impact of Western Literary Theories in Tamil, published by Kaavya, Chennai)
12. பொருள்கோள் நோக்கில் தொல்காப்பியம் (Study of Tholkappiyam based on the approach of hermeneutics, published by the International Institute of Tamil Studies, Chennai)
13. பொருள்கோள் ஓர் அறிமுகம் (An Introduction to Hermeneutics, published by Adaiyaalam)
14. தமிழுக்கு அப்பால் (published by Uyirmai)

== Books he has translated (From English to Tamil) ==
1. குழந்தையின் வாழ்க்கையில் முதல் 365 நாட்கள் (The first 365 days in a baby's life)
2. மனித உரிமைகள் பற்றிய ஐ.நா. அறிக்கை (Universal Declaration of Human Rights by the U.N.O)
3. சிறார் உரிமை பற்றிய ஐ.நா. அறிக்கை (U.N.O manifesto of Children's Rights)
4. விஷன்ஸ் கையேடு-மனித உரிமைகளும் குடியுரிமையும் (Vision Handbook on Human Rights and Citizen Rights)
5. விஷன்ஸ் கையேடு-உள்ளூர் மற்றும் உலகளாவிய பிரச்சினைகள் (Vision Handbook on Local and Global Problems)
6. உலகமயமாக்கல் (Globalization - Very Short Introduction Series published by the Oxford University Press)
7. நீட்சே (Nietzsche - Very Short Introduction Series published by the Oxford University Press)
8. இறையியல் (Theology - Very Short Introduction Series published by the Oxford University Press)
9. பயங்கரவாதம் (Terrorism - Very Short Introduction Series published by the Oxford University Press)
10. சமூகவியல் (Sociology - Very Short Introduction Series published by the Oxford University Press)
11. இசை (Music - Very Short Introduction Series published by the Oxford University Press)
12. சிறைப்பட்ட கற்பனை (Captive Imagination by Varavara Rao, Telugu poet)
13. பொறுப்புமிக்க மனிதர்கள் (Serious Men by Manu Joseph)
14. நள்ளிரவின் குழந்தைகள் (Midnight's Children by Salman Rushdie)
15. காந்தியைக் கொன்றவர்கள் (The men who killed Gandhi by Manohar Malgonkar)
16. இந்துக்கள் – ஒரு மாற்று வரலாறு (The Hindus: An Alternative History by Wendy Doniger)
17. நொறுங்கிய குடியரசு (The Broken Republic by Arundhati Roy)
18. ஊரடங்கு இரவு (Curfewed Night by Basharat Peer)
19. டாக்டர் இல்லாத இடத்தில் பெண்கள் (Where there is no Doctor for Women, by Hesperian Foundation)
20. பேற்றுச்செவிலியர் கையேடு (A Hand Book for Midwives, Hesperian Health guides)
21. இணை மருத்துவம், மாற்றுமருத்துவம், உங்கள் உடல்நலம் (Parallel Medicine, Alternative Medicine, Your Health- Mayo Foundation)
22. தலைமுடி இழப்பு-மருத்துவம் (Hair Loss Treatment - Mayo Clinic)
23. மூல வியாதி (Hemorrhoids - Mayo Clinic)
24. ஐம்பது உடல்நலக் குறிப்புகள் (Fifty Health Tips - Mayo Clinic)
25. இயற்கை ஞானம் (Natural Wisdom)
26. மரபணு மாற்றிய உணவுகள் (Genetically Modified Foods)
27. இரண்டாம் சரபோஜி ஆட்சியின்கீழ் தஞ்சாவூர் (Thanjavur under the ruling of Serfoji)
28. கீழையியல் தத்துவம் (Eastern Philosophy)
29. பின்நவீனத்துவம் (Postmodernism)
30. புவி வெப்பமயமாதல் (Global Warming)
31. நிலத்தோற்றமும் கவிதையும் (Landscape and Poetry by Xavier S. Thaninayagam)
32. மவுலானா அபுல்கலாம் ஆசாத் (Maulana Abul Kalam Azad)
33. சமூகவியலின் அடிப்படைகள் (Fundamentals of Sociology by Fr. Gisbert)
34. கடவுள் சந்தை (God Market by Meera Nanda)
35. அரசியலுக்கோர் இலக்கணம் (A Grammar of Politics by Prof. Harold Laski)
36. நாகரிகங்களின் மோதல் (The Clash of Civilizations by Samuel Huntington)
37. வியத்தகு இந்தியா (The Wonder That Was India by Prof. Arthur Llewellyn Basham)
38. வரலாற்றில் பார்ப்பன நீக்கம் (Debrahmanization of History, by Braj Ranjan Mani)
39. உன் தோலுக்கு அடியில் நீ (You Beneath Your Skin, by Damyanti Biswas)

== Books he has published ==
1. தமிழிலக்கியத்தில் ஒடுக்கப்பட்டோர் நிலையும் மேம்பாடும் 2006 (The Condition of the Oppressed and their Empowerment in Tamil Literature, published by Bishop Heber College, Tiruchi)
2. அமுதம் 1999 (A Memoire on the Contribution of Fr. Amudhan, Secretary of Tamil Literature Society, Tiruchi. It contains several critical articles on Tamil Literature.)
3. உரசல்கள் 1985 (Essays on Comparative Literature in Tamil, published by the Tamil Department, Bishop Heber College)
4. நாற்றுகள் 1990 (A collection of Literary Articles in Tamil, published by the Tamil Department, Bishop Heber College)
