= Serious Men (film) =

2020 Indian satirical comedy-drama film

- Netflix release poster
- Directed by: Sudhir Mishra
- Written by: Bhavesh Mandalia; Abhijeet Khuman; Niren Bhatt; Nikhil Nair
- Based on: Serious Men by Manu Joseph
- Produced by: Sudhir Mishra; Bhavesh Mandalia; Sejal Shah
- Starring: Nawazuddin Siddiqui; Indira Tiwari; Nassar; Aakshath Das; Sanjay Narvekar; Shweta Basu Prasad; Yogesh Yadav
- Cinematography: Alexander Sukala
- Edited by: Atanu Mukherjee
- Music by: Karel Antonin
- Production companies: Bombay Fables; Cineraas Entertainment
- Distributed by: Netflix
- Release date: 2 October 2020
- Running time: 114 minutes
- Country: India
- Language: Hindi

Serious Men is an Indian Hindi-language satirical comedy-drama film directed by Sudhir Mishra. It is based on the book of the same name by Manu Joseph and features Nawazuddin Siddiqui in the lead role. The film is produced by Bombay Fables and Cineraas Entertainment. It was released on Netflix on 2 October 2020. Exploring the themes of class, caste, and prejudice, the film is a reminder of the challenges that Dalit people face in India.

At the 2021 Filmfare OTT Awards, Serious Men received three nominations, including Best Supporting Actor in a Web Original Film for Aakshath Das, and won two awards: Best Web Original Film and Best Actor in a Web Original Film (Siddiqui).

== Plot ==
The film follows Ayyan Mani, a middle-aged man working as a personal assistant to Dr. Arvind Acharya, an astronomer at the National Institute of Fundamental Research in Mumbai. He lives in a slum with his wife Oja and their ten-year-old son Adi. Furious at his situation in life, Ayyan develops the outrageous story that Adi is a science genius. Adi, though a bright boy, is no genius. Ayyan coaches him on what to say and do in public, and he uses a Bluetooth hearing aid to provide the boy with answers. He also manages to procure exam question papers and helps his son get good grades in school. Ayyan's scheme works, and Adi soon becomes a local celebrity. He is invited to give talks at schools and universities and is even featured on national television.

Ayyan's success attracts the attention of local politician Keshav Dhavre and his daughter Anuja, who sees Adi as a potential asset for their party. They offer Ayyan a large sum of money if he can get Adi to endorse the politician's campaign in the upcoming election and convince the slum dwellers to relocate so a new housing project can be built. Ayyan agrees, but things soon begin to go awry when Adi innocently reveals to his classmate Savali that his father provides him test answers. Ayyan subsequently threatens Savali that he will get her father, who also works at the institute, dismissed from work if she reveals the secret. Dr. Acharya's job is jeopardized when the results of one of his studies prove dubious, and Ayyan, already dissatisfied with the way he is treated at work, reveals this to Acharya's rival, Dr. Namboodiri, who gets Acharya fired.

Ayyan's subterfuge is revealed, however, when Dr. Acharya visits Adi at school and finds out the truth. He subsequently threatens Ayyan, who promises to get him his job back. He pleads with Anuja and her father, who assure him this will be done. Namboodiri threatens to reveal Acharya's fraud to the public if he is reinstated, and Acharya counter-threatens to sue him for spying on him. To save face, Namboodiri confesses that it was Ayyan who leaked the botched study, and Acharya reveals the truth about Adi to Anuja and Keshav. They confront Ayyan but tell him to maintain the facade until Adi completes one final speech and their goals are achieved. Oja eventually learns the truth, and she despises Ayyan for his deception.

Ayyan then turns to Dr. Acharya for help, explaining why he pulled the stunt and giving him the letters authorising his reinstatement. Acharya suggests they leave Mumbai, and he publicly endorses Adi. Ayyan tells Adi to give the final speech, but this time, Adi speaks honestly and reveals that he is no genius.

In the final scene, the family is shown living in a seaside village in Kerala.

== Cast ==
- Nawazuddin Siddiqui as Ayyan Mani
- Indira Tiwari as Oja Mani
- Aakshath Das as Adi Mani
- Nassar as Dr. Arvind Acharya
- Sanjay Narvekar as Keshav Dhavre
- Shweta Basu Prasad as Anuja Dhavre
- Vidhi Chitalia as Oparna
- Pathy Aiyar as Udayan
- Sameer Khakhar as Ganesh Tawde
- Uday Mahesh as Dr. Namboodri
- Manu Joseph as Journalist at press conference

== Production ==
The film is based on the book Serious Men by Manu Joseph. The makers of the film decided to cast Nawazuddin Siddiqui as the lead in June 2019. Principal photography commenced in September 2019.

== Release ==
The film was released on Netflix on 2 October 2020.

On the review aggregator website Rotten Tomatoes, 90% of 10 critics' reviews are positive, with an average rating of 6.5/10.

== Accolades ==
Year	Award	Category	Recipient(s)	Result	Ref.
2021	Asian Academy Creative Awards	Best Editing	Atanu Mukherjee	Won	
2021	Asian Academy Creative Awards	Best Cinematography	Alexander Surkala	Won	
2021	International Emmy Awards	Best Actor	Nawazuddin Siddiqui	Nominated	
2021	Filmfare OTT Awards	Best Web Original Film	Serious Men	Won	
2021	Filmfare OTT Awards	Best Actor in a Web Original Film	Nawazuddin Siddiqui	Won	
2021	Filmfare OTT Awards	Best Supporting Actor in a Web Original Film	Aakshath Das	Nominated	
