= Gaj Ukiler Hatya Rahasya =

2010 Bengali film

Gaj Ukiler Hatya Rahasya is a Bengali comedy thriller film directed by Kingshuk Dey with Jagannath Chatterjee and produced by Ranjan Das based on the same name novel of Ashapurna Devi. The film was released on 3 June 2010 under the banner of Channel-B Entertainment.

== Plot ==
Lawyer Gajapati, alias Gaj Ukil, is found strangled to death. His best friend Gupi Moktar discovers that his own Gamcha (towel) is missing, which has been used as murder weapon. Being shocked and fearing Gupi disappears from his flat but he realizes that he is being continuously followed by two mysterious and peculiar youngmen Tapa and Madna.

== Cast ==
- Biplab Chatterjee
- Arun Bandopadhyay
- Ashok Banerjee
- Premangshu
- Kanchan Banerjee
- Pradip Dhar
