= Bed Stories =

Indian anthology television series

- Genre: Romance; Drama; Anthology
- Written by: Arpita Pattanayak; Sufi Khan (Dialogues)
- Directed by: Arpita Pattanayak
- Starring: Sanjay Mishra; Rajendra Gupta; Indira Tiwari; Natasha Rashtogi; Saharsh Kumar Shukla; Paritosh Tripathi; Aparajita Dey
- Composer: Semal–Nikhil
- Original language: Hindi
- No. of seasons: 1
- No. of episodes: 7

Production
- Executive producer: Rohit Ranjan
- Producers: Sooraj Khanna; Puneet Shukla
- Cinematography: Shuv Sanket Mahapatra
- Editor: Arpita Pattanayak
- Production companies: Films by Filmbluffs; Rids Entertainment

Original release
- Network: Disney+ Hotstar
- Release: 7 July 2022

Bed Stories is an Indian Hindi-language romantic anthology streaming television series produced by Sooraj Khanna and Puneet Shukla. Written and directed by Arpita Pattanayak. It stars Sanjay Mishra, Rajendra Gupta, Indira Tiwari, Aparajita Dey, Natasha Rashtogi, Saharsh Kumar Shukla, Taneea Rajawat with an ensemble cast of actors. All seven episodes released on Disney+ Hotstar on 7 July 2022.

== Cast ==
- Sanjay Mishra as The Bed
- Rajendra Gupta as Ramdas Haridas Chudasama (Episode 2)
- Indira Tiwari as Jaweda
- Saharsh Kumar Shukla as Avtar
- Taneea Rajawat as Rama (Episode 1)
- Paritosh Tripathi as Dayavaan
- Priyanshu Singh as Aditya (Episode 1)
- Gazal Sood as Karishma (Episode 3)
- Natasha Rastogi as Sushma (Episode 2)
- Chetan Sharma as Shahid
- Vikas Shukla as Ayub
- Prageet Pandit as Karan (Episode 3)
- Aparajita Dey as Rani
- Altaf Khan
- Jiya Solanki as Rinki
- Harveer Singh
- Junaid Khan
- Tripurari Yadav
- Samridhi Chandola
