= Oral Koodi Kallanayi =

Oraal Koodi Kallanaayi
- Directed by: P. A. Thomas
- Written by: S. L. Puram Sadanandan
- Screenplay by: J. Sasikumar
- Produced by: P. A. Thomas
- Starring: Prem Nazir; Sheela; Adoor Bhasi; Thikkurissy Sukumaran Nair
- Cinematography: P. B. Maniyam
- Edited by: K. D. George
- Music by: K. V. Job
- Production company: Thomas Pictures
- Distributed by: Thomas Pictures
- Release date: 7 May 1964
- Country: India
- Language: Malayalam

Oraal Koodi Kallanaayi (transl. One More Person Became a Thief) is a 1964 Indian Malayalam-language film, directed and produced by P. A. Thomas and Manneth David. The film stars Prem Nazir, Sheela, Adoor Bhasi and Thikkurissy Sukumaran Nair. The film had musical score by K. V. Job.

== Cast ==
- Prem Nazir as Prabhakaran
- V.C Ahammadunni (Ex MP)
- Sheela as Aysha
- Adoor Bhasi as Panikkar
- Thikkurissy Sukumaran Nair
- Jeevan Prakash
- Pappukutty Bhagavathar
- P. J. Antony
- P. A. Thomas as Beeran
- J. Sasikumar
- T. S. Muthaiah as Govindhan
- Prathapachandran
- Alleppey Vincent
- Ambika as Devaki Teacher
- Devaki
- Gemini Chandra
- K.S Parvathi
- Ravi
- Master Jithendran
- Gemini Ganesan
- J. A. R. Anand
- Kushalakumari
- Manikyam
- Murali as Shekaran Master
- Panjabi
- Pankajavalli
- S. P. Pillai as Manak Kammath
- V. S. Achari
- Govind Paliyat
- Jose
- Hariram
- Hashim
- Aravindan
- Krishnan
- Gopi
- Kipson
- Raman
- Madhavan

== Soundtrack ==
The music was composed by K. V. Job with lyrics by Sreemoolanagaram Vijayan, Abhayadev and G. Sankara Kurup.

No.	Song	Singers	Lyrics	Length (m:ss)
1	"Chaaykkadakkaaran Beeraankaakkede"	K. J. Yesudas, P. Leela	Sreemoolanagaram Vijayan	
2	"Enthinum Meethe Muzhangatte"	P. Leela	Abhayadev	
3	"Kaarunyam Kolunna"	P. Leela, Chorus	G. Sankara Kurup	
4	"Kannuneer Pozhikkoo"	K. J. Yesudas	Abhayadev	
5	"Karivala Vikkana"	P. Leela	Abhayadev	
6	"Kinaavilennum Vannene"	K. J. Yesudas, P. Leela	Abhayadev	
7	"Maanam Karuthaalum"	K. J. Yesudas	Abhayadev	
8	"Poovukal Thendum"	P. Leela, Chorus	G. Sankara Kurup	
9	"Unnanam Uranganam"	C. O. Anto	Abhayadev	
10	"Veeshuka Nee Kodumkatte"	Jayalakshmi	Abhayadev	
