= Aatma Bandhuvu =

1962 film

- Theatrical release poster
- Directed by: P. S. Ramakrishna Rao
- Written by: Samudrala Jr. (dialogues)
- Screenplay by: P. S. Ramakrishna Rao
- Story by: Ashapurna Devi
- Produced by: Y. Rama Krishna Prasad; C. V. R. Prasad
- Starring: N. T. Rama Rao; Savitri
- Cinematography: K. S. Prasad
- Edited by: B. Harinarayana
- Music by: K. V. Mahadevan
- Production company: Saradhi Studios
- Release date: 14 December 1962
- Running time: 158 minutes
- Country: India
- Language: Telugu

Aathma Bandhuvu (transl. Soul Relative) is a 1962 Indian Telugu-language drama film, produced by Sarathi Studios and directed by P. S. Ramakrishna Rao. The film stars N. T. Rama Rao and Savitri, with music composed by K. V. Mahadevan. It is a remake of the Tamil-language film Padikkadha Medhai (1960), which itself was a remake of 1953 Bengali-language film Jog Biyog, based on Jog Biyog, a novel of Ashapurna Devi.

== Plot ==
Rao Bahadur Chandrasekharam is a successful businessman and has a loving family with a compassionate wife, Parvathi, and three sons, Prasad, Sridhar, and Raghu; two daughters, the widowed Mangalamba and Geetha; two daughters-in-law Lalitha, Kamala, and their children. Along with them, they adopt an orphan Ranga, an innocent man who is utterly devoted to the family. Parvathi has promised to make her childhood friend's (Prabhavathi) daughter Lakshmi her third daughter-in-law. However, Raghu refuses to marry her because he is already in love with a girl, Janaki. To ensure that Parvathi's promise is honoured, Ranga marries Lakshmi. Everything moves happily; Geetha also gets engaged to Madhu, the son of a rich man named Rajarao. Life suddenly takes a U-turn, and Chandrasekharam becomes bankrupt, which leads to Geetha's marriage being called off. From there, his family members' attitudes change entirely, and they start seeing Chandrasekharam in a low profile. Ranga cannot tolerate that and reacts to their behavior, so they blame a theft on him. Seeing this, Chandrasekharam asks Ranga and Lakshmi to leave the house. Ranga gets acquainted with a person named Kotaiah and finds a job in a factory owned by Rajarao. Afterward, a broken-hearted Chandrasekharam dies, leaving his wife and youngest daughter to be in their children's merciless care. Ranga, with his simplicity and pure-heartedness, proves in the end that love and affection are the most incredible wealth.

== Cast ==
- N. T. Rama Rao as Ranga
- Savitri as Lakshmi
- S. V. Ranga Rao as Rao Bahadur Chandrasekharam
- Relangi as Kotaiah
- Haranath as Madhu
- Padmanabham as Raghu
- Raja Babu as Mohan
- Dr. Sivaramakrishnaiah as Retired Army officer Damodaram
- A. V. Subba Rao as Raja Rao
- Vallam Narasimha Rao as Prasad
- Edida Nageswara Rao as Sridhar
- Kannamba as Parvathi
- Suryakantham as Mangalamba
- Girija as Geeta
- Surabhi Balasaraswathi as Anjamma
- Sarada as Janaki
- Meena Kumari as Lalitha
- Mohana as Kamala

== Soundtrack ==
Music composed by K. V. Mahadevan.

Song title	Lyrics	Singers	length
"Anaganaga Oka Raju"	C. Narayana Reddy	Ghantasala, P. Susheela	3:38
"Chaduvurani"	C. Narayana Reddy	P. Susheela	3:26
"Yevaro Ye Ooro"	Samudrala Sr.	Ghantasala	4:13
"Cheerakatte"	Kosaraju	Ghantasala	3:19
"Theeyani Oohalu"	C. Narayana Reddy	P. Susheela, K. Jamuna Rani	4:15
"Maradu Maradu"	Kosaraju	P. Susheela	4:26
"Dhakkenule"	Sri Sri	P. B. Srinivas, K. Jamuna Rani	3:06
