= The Illicit Happiness of Other People =

2012 novel by Manu Joseph

- First edition
- Author: Manu Joseph
- Language: English
- Genre: Fiction; Drama
- Publisher: HarperCollins
- Publication date: 2012
- Publication place: India
- Media type: Print (paperback, hardback)
- Pages: 352
- ISBN: 9781443416375

The Illicit Happiness of Other People is a 2012 novel by Manu Joseph. Described by the author as semi-autobiographical, the novel explores the interplay of human psychology, existential nihilism and misanthropy, as well as the complexities of adolescence and sexual repression, among other things.

== Plot ==
The narrative revolves around a Malayali Christian family living in Madras during the early 1990s. Ousep Chacko is a brooding journalist who routinely wakes the neighbors after drinking sprees and then threatens to hang himself with his lungi. His eccentric wife, Mariamma, talks to walls; Thoma, their son, is smitten with his older, next-door neighbor Mythili. The family, though disintegrating, is united in its grief, for three years ago Thoma's 17-year-old brother, Unni, fell to his death from the balcony. A desperate Ousep sets out to solve the mystery of his son's supposed suicide.

== Characters ==
- Ousep Chacko: an alcoholic journalist who is obsessively pursuing the mystery behind his son Unni's suicide.
- Mariamma Chacko: Ousep's eccentric, self-talking wife and mother of Unni and Thoma.
- Unni Chacko: late son of Ousep and Mariamma who committed suicide.
- Thoma Chacko: Unni's younger brother, who has a simpler approach to life.
- Mythili Balasubramanium: next-door neighbor and friend of both Unni and Thoma.

== Reception ==
Malcolm Forbes of Star Tribune wrote: "What could have been another standard tale of a dysfunctional family coming apart at the seams turns out to be something far more complex and clever." Martin Patriquin of Maclean's reviewed, "Visceral and at times hilarious, Illicit is an indictment of a society that has surrendered to the baser instincts of its men." Sam Sacks of The Wall Street Journal said that the novel "injects dark, rueful laughter into an immensely touching story of loss."

Arminta Wallace of The Irish Times called it a "blend of philosophical inquiry and tart social commentary" which is "smartly written and consistently entertaining". Deepanjana Pal of Daily News and Analysis wrote that the novel is "fun, despite all the unhappiness that riddles the novel, and Joseph avoids the curse of the second novel with panache." Christy Edwall of The Daily Telegraph wrote: "Joseph twists what I feared would be a book for people wanting a second White Tiger (that is, local son makes good in a shady world) into a cocktail of character, culture and religion."
