= Indira Tiwari =

Indian actress

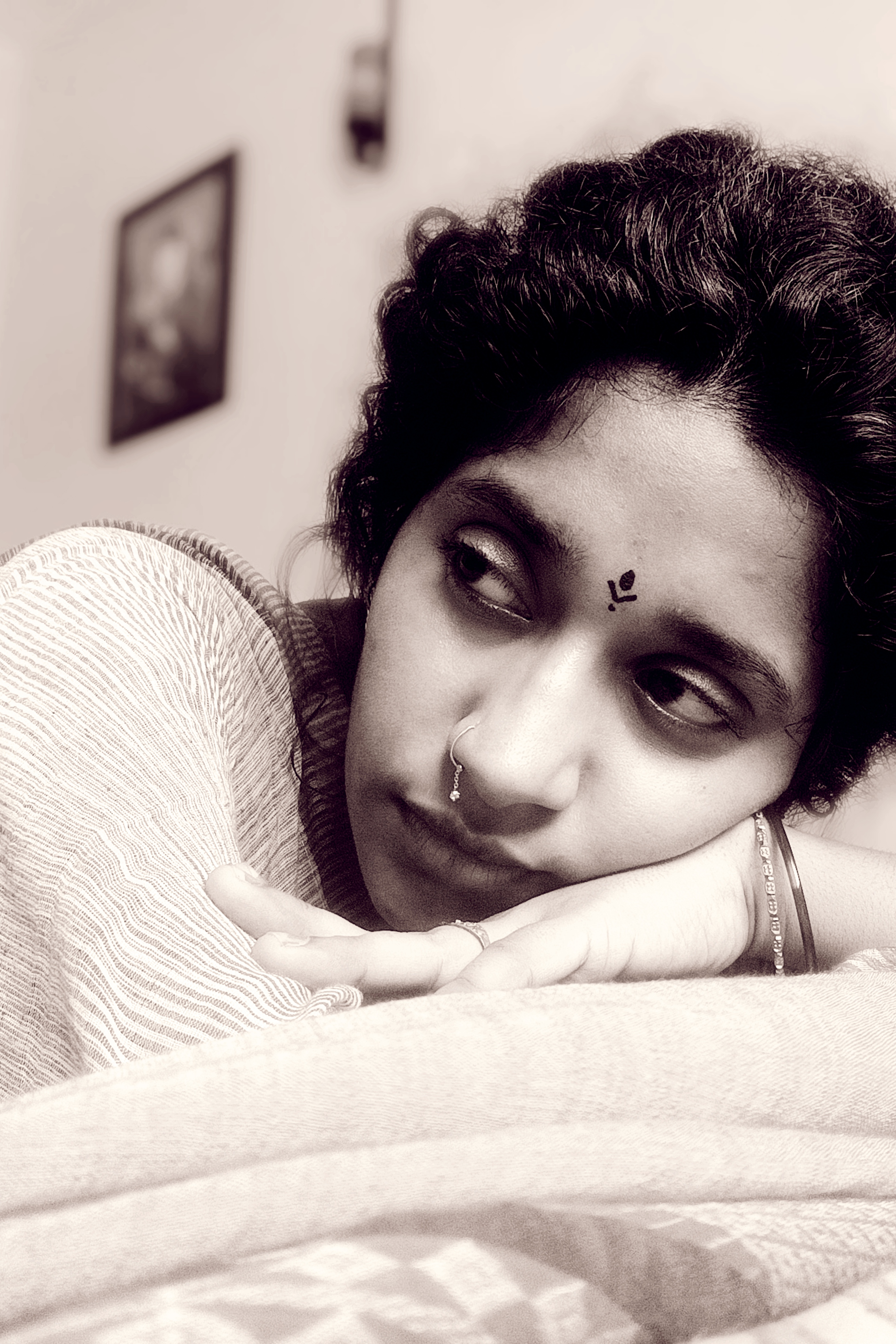
- Tiwari in 2020
- Born: Bhopal, India
- Occupation: Actress
- Years active: 2011–present

Indira Tiwari is an Indian actress. She has appeared in the films Aarakshan (2011), Nazarband (2020), Serious Men (2020), and Gangubai Kathiawadi (2022).

== Career ==
Tiwari began her acting career by portraying a student in Prakash Jha's 2011 Bollywood movie Aarakshan. She later appeared in four short films: Ekanth, The Manliest Man, Unfair, and Return to Cinder.

In 2020, she starred in Nazarband, directed by Suman Mukhopadhyay and based on a short story by Ashapurna Devi. The same year, she played the female lead alongside Nawazuddin Siddiqui in director Sudhir Mishra's Netflix original Serious Men.

Tiwari has a prominent role in the 2022 film Gangubai Kathiawadi, directed by Sanjay Leela Bhansali and based on the book Mafia Queens of Mumbai by Hussain Zaidi.

== Filmography ==
List of appearances, with year, title, and role shown
Year	Title	Role	Notes
2011	Aarakshan	Tabela topper student	
2014	Ekanth	Reena	Short
2016	The Manliest Man	Sarla (Karia's wife)	Short
2017	Unfair	Ayesha	Short
2019	Return to Cinder	Ann	Short
2020	Serious Men	Oja Mani	
2020	Nazarband	Vasanti	
2022	Gangubai Kathiawadi	Kamli	
2022	Bed Stories	Jaweda	Web series
2024	Bastar: The Naxal Story	Ratna	
2025	Spying Stars	Anandi	
2026	Azad Bharath	Saraswati Rajamani	
