= G. Sankara Kurup =

Indian Malayali poet and literary critic (1901–1978)

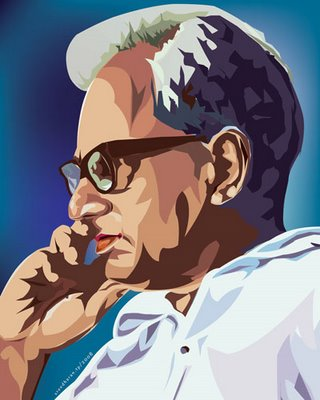
- Depiction of Shankarakurup in 1968
- Born: 3 June 1901; Nayathode, Kingdom of Cochin
- Died: 2 February 1978 (aged 76); Thiruvananthapuram, Kerala, India
- Occupations: Teacher; poet; essayist; translator; lyricist; parliamentarian
- Spouse: Subhadra Amma
- Children: Raveendranathan (Son); Radha (Daughter)
- Parents: Nellikkappilli Variayath Sankara Warrier; Vadakkani Mararth Lakshmikutty Marasyar
- Writing career
- Notable work: Odakkuzhal (Poetry) (1950)
- Notable awards: Padma Bhushan; Jnanpith Award; Kendra Sahitya Akademi Award; Kerala Sahitya Akademi Award

Govinda Kurup Sankara Kurup (3 June 1901 – 2 February 1978), also referred to as Mahakavi G (The Great Poet G), was an Indian poet, essayist and literary critic of Malayalam literature. Known as one of the greats of Malayalam poetry, he was the first recipient of the Jnanpith Award―the highest Indian literary honor. He served as a nominated member of the Rajya Sabha from 1968 to 1972 and received the Padma Bhushan, the third highest Indian civilian award, in 1967. He was also a recipient of Sahitya Akademi Award, Kerala Sahitya Akademi Award and Soviet Land Nehru Award.

== Life and career ==
Sankara Kurup was born on June 3, 1901, at Nayathode, a hamlet in the erstwhile Kingdom of Cochin (now in Ernakulam district of the south Indian state of Kerala) to Nellikkappilli Variyath Sankara Warrier and Vadakkani Marath Lakshmikutty maarasyar His early education was at the local schools in Nayathode and Perumbavoor after passing his 7th standard examination, he passed the Vernacular Higher Examination from a school in Muvattupuzha. Subsequently, he started his career as the headmaster of Kottamam Convent School when he was only 16 and during his tenure there, continued his studies to pass the Malayalam Pandit and Vidwan examinations. In 1927, he moved to Thiruvilluamala High School as the Malayalam Pandit and to Thrissur training school in 1927 as a teacher. In 1931, he joined Maharaja's College, Ernakulam as a lecturer where he stayed until his retirement from service as a professor in 1956. He also served as a producer at the Thiruvananthapuram station of the All India Radio.

Sankara Kurup served Kerala Sahitya Akademi as its fourth president. n He was also the president of the Kerala Sasthra Sahithya Parishad and served as the chief editor of its official magazine; it was during his tenure that the magazine became a tri-monthly. He edited another magazine, too, titled Thilakam. In 1968, he was nominated as a member of the Rajya Sabha, the upper house of the Parliament of India.

Sankara Kurup married Subhadra Amma in 1931 and the couple had two children, a son, Ravindranath and a daughter, Radha. Radha was married to M. Achuthan, an academic and a prominent literary critic. He died on February 2, 1979, aged 76, at Thiruvananthapuram Medical college following post surgical complications,

== Legacy ==
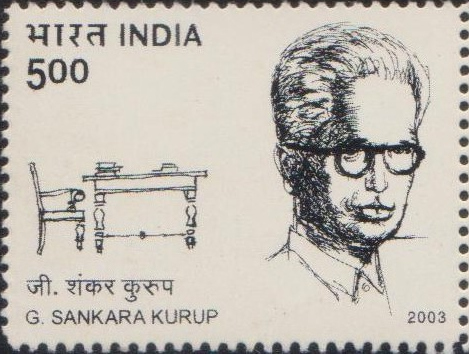
Kurup on a 2003 stamp of India

Kurup published his first poem, called Salutation to Nature in 1918, while still a student and his first poetry anthology, Sahitya Kouthukam, was published in 1923. By the time he published Sooryakanthi in 1935, he had already established his place among Malayalam poets. Overall, he published over 40 books which included 25 poetry anthologies, short stories, memoirs, play and prose. He translated the Rubáiyát (1932) of Omar Khayyám, the Sanskrit Meghadūta (1944) of Kalidas, and the collection of poems Gitanjali (1959) of Rabindranath Tagore into Malayalam. He also wrote the lyrics for P. J. Cherian's Nirmala, (1948), the first Malayalam film to incorporate music and songs. Besides Nirmala, he wrote the lyrics for such movies as Oral Koodi Kallanayi, Abhayam, Aduthaduthu and Olipporu. His poems have been translated into English by A. K. Ramanujan under the title, Selected poems of G. Sankara Kurup. Along with his masterpiece, Odakuzhal, Poojapushpam, Nimisham, Navathidhi, Ithalukal, Pathikante Paattu, Muthukal, Anthardaham, Chenkathirukal, Vishwadarshanam, Madhuram Soumyam Deeptham, and Sandhya Ragam are considered as his major works. His autobiography was titled Ormmayude Olangalil, and was published by National Book Stall.

== Awards and honors ==
Sankara Kurup received the Kerala Sahitya Akademi Award for Poetry in 1961 for his anthology, Viswadarshanam. The Central Sahitya Akademi honored him with their annual award for poetry in 1963. He was the first winner of the Jnanpith Award, India's highest literary award, when the award was instituted in 1965. He received the prize for his anthology, Odakkuzhal (The Bamboo Flute) which was published in 1950; He set apart a part of the prize money to establish Odakkuzhal Award in 1968 and the work was later translated into Hindi, titled, Bansuri. In 1967, he received the Soviet Land Nehru Award and a year later, the Government of India awarded him he third highest civilian honor of the Padma Bhushan. The India Post issued a commemorative postal stamp on Kurup in 2003, under the series, Jnanpith Award Winners.

== Work ==
=== Poetry ===
- Sankara Kurup, G. (1955). "Ithalukal". find.uoc.ac.in (in Malayalam). Archived from the original on 28 January 2019.
- G. Sankara Kurup (11 November 2016). Odakkuzhal. DC Books. ASIN B01MXOODZD.
- G Sankara Kurup (1972). G-yude Theranjedutha Kavithakal. Sāhityapr̲avarttaka Sahakaraṇasaṅghaṃ.
- G Sankara Kurup. G-yude Kuttikavithakal. Mambazham. ISBN 9789386680174. Archived from the original on 28 January 2019.
- G Sankara Kurup (1964). Jeevana Sangeetham. Sāhityapr̲avarttaka Sahakaraṇasaṅghaṃ.
- G Sankara Kurup. Pathikante Paattu. DC Books. Archived from the original on 27 April 2015.
- G Sankara Kurup (1966). Maduram, Saumyam, Deeptham. Sāhityapr̲avarttaka Sahakaraṇasaṅghaṃ.
- G Sankara Kurup (1963). Moonnaruviyum Oru Puzhayum. Sāhityapr̲avarttaka Sahakaraṇasaṅghaṃ.
- G Sankara Kurup (1979). Velichathinte Dhoothan - Kavithakal. Sāhityapr̲avarttaka Sahakaraṇasaṅghaṃ.
- G Sankara Kurup (1971). Sandhyaragam: Kavithakaḷ. Sāhityapr̲avarttaka Sahakaraṇasaṅghaṃ.
- G. Sankara Kurup. Sooryakanthiyum Mattu Pradhana Kavithakalum. DC Books. Archived from the original on 28 January 2019.
- G Sankara Kurup (1966). Odakkuzhal Therenjadeutha 60 Ghandakruthikal. Mathrubhumi Books.
- G Sankara Kurup (1953). Antardhahaṃ: Kavitakaḷ. Sāhityapr̲avarttaka Sahakaraṇasaṅghaṃ : National Book Stall.
- G Sankara Kuru (January 2007). Kavitha Parvam. DC Books. ISBN 9788126416141. Archived from the original on 28 January 2019.
- Sankara Kurup, G. (1973). "Malayala Kavya Sangraham". find.uoc.ac.in (in Malayalam).
- G, Sankara Kurup. "Ratnavali". find.uoc.ac.in (in Malayalam).
- G, Sankarakuruppu (1964). "Katte Vaa Kadale Vaa". find.uoc.ac.in (in Malayalam).
- G. Sankara Kurup (28 January 2019). "Oalappeeppi". Kerala State Central Library Catalogue.
- Sankara Kurup, G., Govindan Nair, Edasserry, Kurup, O. N. V, Krishna Pillai, Changampuzha. (2007). "Kavithaparvam". Kerala State Central Library Catalogue. DC Books.
- G. Sankara Kurup. "Ilamchundukal". Kerala State Central Library Catalogue.
- G. Sankara Kurup (1975). "Chenkathirukal". Kerala State Central Library Catalogue. Vidyarthimithram.
- G. Sankara Kurup (1976). "Viswadarsanam". Kerala State Central Library Catalogue. Sahitya Pravarthaka Co-operative Society.
- G. Sankara Kurup. "Vilasalahari". Kerala State Central Library Catalogue.
- G. Sankara Kurup (1945). "Nimisham". Kerala State Central Library Catalogue. Sahitya Pravarthaka Co-operative Society.
- G. Sankara Kurup. "Meghachaya". Kerala State Central Library Catalogue. Poorna Publications.
- G. Sankara Kurup (1951). "Navathithi". Kerala State Central Library Catalogue.
- G. Sankara Kurup. "Vanagayakan". Kerala State Central Library Catalogue. Venus.
- G. Sankara Kurup. "Swapna Saudham". Kerala State Central Library Catalogue.
- G. Sankara Kurup (1961). Patheyam. Sahitya Pravarthaka Co-operative Society.
- G. Sankara Kurup (1955). "Vellilparavakal". National Library. Mangalodayam.
- Kavanakalika (Poetic Buds)
- Dharmarashmi (The Rays of Justice)
- Muthukal (Pearls)
- Swathanthryodhayam (Sunrise of Freedom)
- Poojapushpam (Flowers for Offering)
- Ente Veyil (My Sunlight)

=== Short Story anthologies ===
- G. Sankara Kurup (1948). "Rajanandini". Kerala State Central Library Catalogue.
- Sankara Kurup, G. (1949). "Harischandran". Kerala State Central Library Catalogue. S Sundar Iyer & Sons.
- Sankara Kurup, G. (1962). "Radharaani". find.uoc.ac.in (in Malayalam).
- Kathakauthukam

=== Essays ===
- Sankara Kurup, G. (1969). "Ummar Ghayamum mattu kavithakalum". find.uoc.ac.in (in Malayalam).
- G Sankara Kurup (1967). G-yude Note Book. Vidhyarthimithram Press & Book Depot.
- G. Sankara Kurup. G-yude Gadyalekhanangal. DC Books. Archived from the original on 29 November 2021.
- Kurup.G, Sankara. "Madhyama Vyayogam". find.uoc.ac.in (in Malayalam).
- G, Sankara Kurup. "Sahithya Ratnam". find.uoc.ac.in (in Malayalam).
- G. Sankara Kurup (1986). "Sahithya Parichayam". Kerala State Central Library Catalogue. Mathrubhumi.
- G. Sankara Kurup. "Dharmaputhrar". Kerala State Central Library Catalogue. Poorna Publications.
- G. Sankara Kurup (1944). "Gadyopaharam". Kerala State Central Library Catalogue.
- G. Sankara Kurup. "Lekhamala". Kerala State Central Library Catalogue.
- Mutthum Chippiyum (Pearl and Oyster) (1958)
- * G. Sankara Kurup (1923). "Sahithya Kauthukam". Kerala State Central Library Catalogue. Raman Menon.
- G. Sankara Kurup (1956). "Rakkuyilukal". National Library. Mangalodayam.
- Bhashadeepika
- Bhasha Praveshika (2 volumes)

=== Plays ===
- Sankara Kurup, G. (1954). "Iruttinu Munpu". Kerala State Central Library Catalogue.
- G. Sankara Kurup (1955). "Sandhya". Kerala State Central Library Catalogue.
- G. Sankara Kurup (1956). "August 15". Kerala State Central Library Catalogue. P. K. Brothers.

=== Translations ===
- Rabindranath Tagore (2010). Gitanjali. Translated by G. Sankara Kurup. DC Books. Archived from the original on 28 January 2019.
- Meghadūta of Kalidasa
- Rubaiyat of Omar Khayam

=== Biography, autobiography ===
- Sankara Kurup, G (1984). Ormmayude Olangalil (in Malayalam). Kōṭṭayaṃ: Sāhityapr̲avarttaka Sahakaraṇasaṅghaṃ : National Book Stall. ISBN 9788126465958. OCLC 13822261.
- Sankara Kurup, G. (1977). "Haidarali". find.uoc.ac.in (in Malayalam).
- G. Sankara Kurup (28 January 2019). "Tippu Sultan". Kerala State Central Library Catalogue.

=== Letters ===
- Sanaka Kurup, G; Krishna Varrier, N. V. (1987). Hr̥udayathint̲e Vātāyanaṅṅaḷ: Mahākavi Ji. Śaṅkarakkur̲uppint̲e 131 kathukaḷ (in Malayalam). Kōṭṭayaṃ: Sāhityapr̲avarttaka Sahakaraṇasaṅghaṃ : National Book Stall. OCLC 20823619.
- Sankara Kurup, G; Maulavi, Vakkaṃ; Tāha, Muttāna; State Institute of Languages, Kerala (2007). Vakkam Abdul Khaderinu Gyude Kathukal. Thiruvanthapuraṃ: Kēraḷa Bhāṣhā Institute. ISBN 9788176385992. OCLC 262737709.

=== Translations into other languages ===
- Sankara Kurup, G; Ramanujan, A. K (1969). Selected poems of G. Sankara Kurup. Dialogue Calcutta; distributors: Stechert-Hafner, New York. OCLC 139455.
- G Sankara Kurup (2001). Sweet, Gentle, Radiant: Selected Poems of G. Sankara Kurup. Sahitya Akademi. ISBN 978-81-260-1341-8.
- G Sankara Kurup (1966). Eka aura Naciketā tathā anya kavitāem̐: Oṭakkuzhalakī paravartī racanāem̐. Bhāratīya Jñānapīṭha. ISBN 978-81-263-0620-6.

=== Books and articles on G. Sankara Kurup ===
- Sethukumari, K (1990). Sooryakanthiyude Kavi - Jeevacharithram. Thiruvananthapuraṃ: Samsthana Balasahithya Institute. OCLC 33967260.
- Lilavati, M (1990). Mahakavi G. Sankara Kurup. New Delhi: Sahitya Akademi. OCLC 556532458.
- Madhusūdanan, G (2014). Pr̲aṇāmaṃ: Mahākavi G. : Vāyana, Punarvāyana, Smaraṇa. Kar̲ant̲ Buks. ISBN 9788124019634. OCLC 881280508.
- University of Delhi; Department of Modern Indian Languages (1966). G. Sankara Kurup. Delhi. OCLC 663758102.
- Chandraśekharan Nāir, N (1979). Hindī aur Malayālama ke do simbôlik (pratīkavādī) kavi. Trivandrum. OCLC 705602183.
- Jyoti Kalash: A series on Jnanpith Award winners. Chennai, India. 1998. OCLC 63585792. "Interviews"
- John, Idamaruku (1978). Mahākavi G.: Niroopaṇaṃ (in Malayalam). Kōṭṭayaṃ: National Book Stall. OCLC 5834780.
- S. Guptan Nair (2001). "G. Sankara Kurup and His Poetry". Indian Literature. 45 (6): 10–15. JSTOR 23345754.
- G-yude Kāvyasādhana: Niroopanam (in Malayalam). Kōṭṭayaṃ: Vidyārthimitr̲aṃ Press & Book Depot. 1975. OCLC 6864082.
- Sukumar Azhikode (1997). Śaṅkarakkur̲upp Vimarśhikkappedunnu. Kollam: Imprint Books. ISBN 9788185546940. OCLC 39516244.
- Nārāyaṇan, Thonnaykkal (1987). G. Śaṅkara Kur̲uppint̲e Sāhityapr̲apañchaṃ (in Malayalam). Kōṭṭayaṃ: National Book Stall. OCLC 21484256.
- K. Satchidanandan (2001). "REFLECTIONS: Remembering a Poet: A Note on G. Sankara Kurup". Indian Literature. 45 (6). Sahitya Akademi: 7–9. JSTOR 23345753.
- Kurup, G. Sankara (1972). "Interview with G. Sankara Kurup". Mahfil. 8 (1): 97–108. JSTOR 40874486.

=== Filmography ===
- Nirmala
- Oral Koodi Kallanayi
- Abhayam
- Aduthaduthu
- Olipporu
