= Serious Men =

2010 novel by Manu Joseph

- Author: Manu Joseph
- Language: English
- Genre: Fiction; Humour
- Publisher: HarperCollins
- Publication date: 2010
- Publication place: India
- Media type: Print (paperback, hardback)
- Pages: 310
- ISBN: 8172238525

Serious Men is a 2010 drama fiction novel written by journalist Manu Joseph. The story follows Ayyan Mani, a middle-aged Dalit working as an assistant to a Brahmin astronomer at the Institute of Theory and Research in Mumbai. He lives in a slum with his wife and a son. Furious at his situation in life, Ayyan develops an outrageous story that his 10-year-old son is a mathematical genius – a lie which later gets out of control.

It won the inaugural The Hindu Literary Prize and the 2011 PEN Open Book Award. It was also shortlisted for Man Asian Literary Prize and Bollinger Everyman Wodehouse Prize.

== Development ==
Joseph said that Indian English writers "usually take a very sympathetic and compassionate view of the poor, and I find that fake and condescending." He felt that the poor in India are "increasingly very empowered, and the time has come when the novel can portray them in a more realistic way."

== Reception ==
Tobin Hershaw of The New York Times called the novel "smart and funny". Peter Carty of The Independent felt that the novel "elegantly describes collisions with an unyielding status quo, ably counterpointing the frustrations of the powerless with the unfulfilling realities of power." Bhavana Sharma of The Hindu wrote: "Manu Joseph's novel hammers in the hopelessness, boredom and desperate ambitions of suburban Dalit community in Bombay, and he weaves an interesting and funny satire on the academia of science, love and revenge." Nick Rennison of The Times called it a "bitter, comic novel". Further saying that the novel "skewers a society where new ambitions and older class divisions co-exist."

== Adaptions ==
Serious Men has been adapted into a play by Nikhila Kesavan in Chennai.

In September 2017, it was announced that Sudhir Mishra will be adapting the novel into a feature film with Bhavesh Mandalia writing the screenplay. In 2018, Netflix announced that it will be backing the screen adaptation by Mishra. The eponymous film directed by Mishra and starring Nawazuddin Siddiqui, playing the role of Ayyan Mani opposite actress Indira Tiwari was produced by Bombay Fables and Cineraas Entertainment. It premiered on Netflix on 2 October, 2020 with same title.
