= Jog Biyog =

1953 Bengali novel

Jog Biyog (transl. Addition and Subtraction) is a Bengali language novel of Indian writer Ashapurna Devi. The story, initially named as Baje Khoroch, was published by Calcutta Book Club in 1953 and the plot has been adapted into a number of Indian films.

== Plot ==
The story revolves with the last life crisis of Jamini Mohan and his wife. After the retirement Jamini Mohan and his wife Santoshini continued to be despised in the family of their earning sons. At this time, Gobinda, an orphan of the distant relative, became their mental hope. After facing various humiliation from their blood relationship, Jamini Mohan died and as the mother of three sons, Santoshini became a burden to this family. Eventually Gobinda became Santoshini's absolute refuge.

== Adaptations ==
- Jog Biyog (1953)
- Padikkadha Medhai (1960)
- Aatma Bandhuvu (1962)
- Mehrban (1967)
- Baala Bandana (1971)
- Jog Biyog (1984)
- Swarg (1990)
- Indra Bhavanam (1991)
- Bhai Hela Bhagari (1994)
- Annadata (2002)
