= Jnanpith Award =

Indian literary award

Jnyanapeeth Award
- Award for individual contributions to Literature; Instituted in 1961
- Citation plaque
- Awarded for: Literary award in India
- Sponsored by: Bharatiya Jnanpith
- Reward: ₹11 lakh (equivalent to ₹18 lakh or US$19,000 in 2026)
- First award: 1965
- Final award: 2025
- Most recent winner: Vairamuthu

Highlights
- Total awarded: 65
- First winner: G. Sankara Kurup
- Website: jnanpith.net

The Jnanpith Award is the oldest and the highest Indian literary award presented annually by the Bharatiya Jnanpith to an author for their "outstanding contribution towards literature". Instituted in 1961, the award is bestowed only on Indian writers writing in Indian languages included in the Eighth Schedule of the Constitution of India and English, (Note: The Eighth Schedule to the Constitution of India consists of twenty-two languages viz. Assamese, Bengali, Bodo, Dogri, Gujarati, Hindi, Kannada, Kashmiri, Konkani, Maithili, Malayalam, Manipuri, Marathi, Nepali, Odia, Punjabi, Sanskrit, Santhali, Sindhi, Tamil, Telugu, and Urdu.) with no posthumous conferral.

From 1965 till 1981, the award was given to the authors for their "most outstanding work" and consisted of a citation plaque, a cash prize and a bronze replica of Saraswati, the Hindu goddess of knowledge and wisdom. The first recipient was the Malayalam writer G. Sankara Kurup who received the award in 1965 for his collection of poems, Odakkuzhal (The Bamboo Flute), published in 1950. The rules were revised in subsequent years to consider only works published during the preceding twenty years, excluding the year for which the award was to be given. In 1981, the cash prize was increased to ₹1.5 lakh (equivalent to ₹33 lakh or US$36,000 in 2026).

As of 2015, the cash prize has been revised to ₹11 lakh (equivalent to ₹18 lakh or US$19,000 in 2026). The award has been conferred upon 65 writers including eight women authors. In 1976, Bengali novelist Ashapoorna Devi became the first woman to win the award, for the 1965 novel Prothom Protishruti (The First Promise), the first in a trilogy. (Note: The trilogy consists of Prothom Protishruti, Subarnalata, and Bakul Katha.)

== Background ==
The Bharatiya Jnanpith, a research and cultural institute founded in 1944 by industrialist Sahu Shanti Prasad Jain of the Sahu Jain family, conceived an idea in May 1961 to start a scheme "commanding national prestige and of international standard" to "select the best book out of the publications in Indian languages". Later in November, Rama Jain, the founder President of the Bharatiya Jnanpith, invited a few literary experts to discuss various aspects of the scheme. Jain along with Kaka Kalelkar, Harivansh Rai Bachchan, Ramdhari Singh Dinkar, Jainendra Kumar, Jagdish Chandra Mathur, Prabhakar Machwe, Akshaya Kumar Jain, and Lakshmi Chandra Jain presented the initial draft to the then President of India Rajendra Prasad who had shown interest in the scheme's implementation. The idea was also discussed at the 1962 annual sessions of the All India Gujarati Sahitya Parishad and the Bharatiya Bhasha Parishad.

On 2 April 1962, around 300 writers of various Indian languages were invited to Delhi for the two sessions conducted by Dharamvir Bharati in which the draft was finalised and later presented to Prasad. The first award selection committee meeting was scheduled for 16 March 1963 and Prasad was appointed as its president. However, Prasad died on 28 February 1963 and thus the scheduled meeting was chaired by Kalelkar and Sampurnanand acted as president of the committee.

The first Selection Board consisted of Kalelkar, Niharranjan Ray, Karan Singh, R. R. Diwakar, V. Raghavan, B. Gopal Reddy, Harekrushna Mahatab, Rama Jain, and Lakshmi Chandra Jain and was headed by Sampurnanand. Works that were published between 1921 and 1951 were considered for the first award. The nine language committees that were formed were to submit to the board nominations along with translations of the work into Hindi or English. The final round had four authors; Kazi Nazrul Islam (Bengali), D. V. Gundappa (Kannada), Viswanatha Satyanarayana (Telugu), and G. Sankara Kurup (Malayalam). On 19 November 1966, Kurup was presented with the citation, statue of Saraswati, and a cheque for prize of ₹1 lakh (equivalent to ₹66 lakh or US$70,000 in 2026) at a ceremony held at Vigyan Bhavan, Delhi. (Note: The Malayalam language committee headed by N. V. Krishna Warrier submitted an undisputed nomination of Kurup's work Odakkuzhal although the Kerala Sahitya Akademi opined that no work in Malayalam language was worthy of the inaugural prize.) In his acceptance speech, Kurup appreciated the concept of the new award and thanked it for bringing "integration of the diverse people of this land on a spiritual plane".

== Rules and selection process ==
The nominations for the award are received from various literary experts, teachers, critics, universities, and numerous literary and language associations. Every three years, an advisory committee is constituted for each of the languages. The language of the most recent recipient's work is not eligible for consideration for the next two years. Each committee consists of three literary critics and scholars of their respective languages. All the nominations are scrutinised by the committee and their recommendations are submitted to the Jnanpith Award Selection Board.

The Selection Board consists of between seven and eleven members of "high repute and integrity". Each member is part of the committee for a term of three years which can also be extended further for two more terms. The recommendations of all language advisory committees are evaluated by the board based on complete or partial translations of the selected writings of the proposed writers into Hindi or English. The recipient for a particular year is announced by the Selection Board, which has final authority in selection.

== List of recipients ==
Key
†	Indicates a joint award for the given year

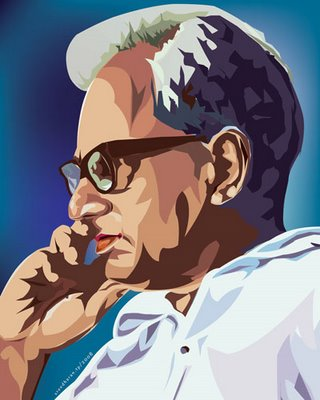
G. Sankara Kurup was the first recipient of the award.

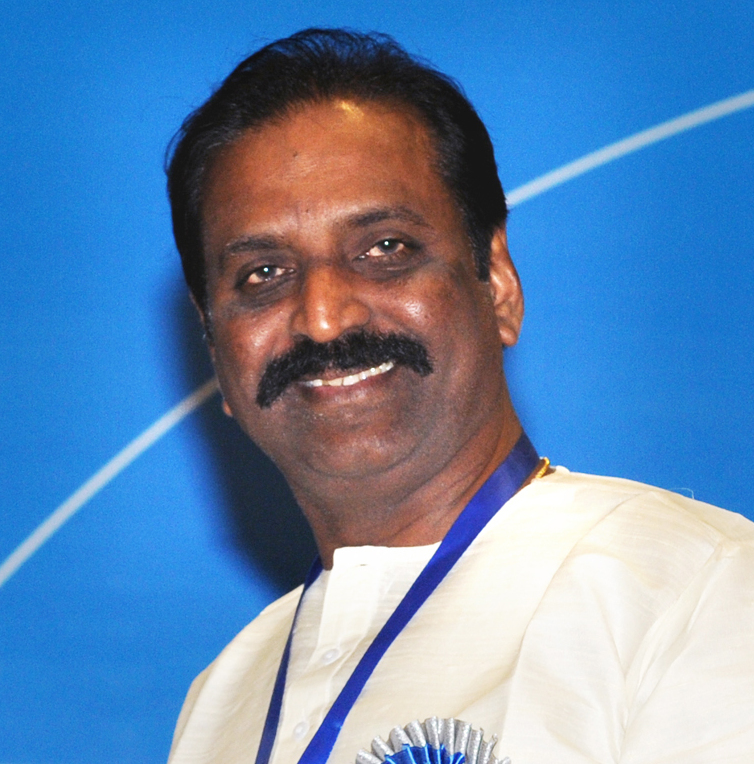
Vairamuthu is the most recent recipient of the award.

List of award recipients, showing the year, and language(s)
Year	Recipient(s)	Language(s)	Works	Genre	Refs./Notes
1965 (1st)	G. Sankara Kurup	Malayalam	Odakkuzhal (The Bamboo Flute)	Poetry	(Note: Awarded for Odakkuzhal.)
1966 (2nd)	Tarasankar Bandyopadhyay	Bengali	Ganadevata	Novel	(Note: Awarded for Ganadevta.)
1967 (3rd) †	Umashankar Joshi	Gujarati	Nishita	Poetry	(Note: Awarded for Nishitha.)
1967 (3rd) †	Kuppali Venkatappa Puttappa 'Kuvempu'	Kannada	Sri Ramayana Darshanam	Epic	(Note: Awarded for Sri Ramayana Darshanam.)
1968 (4th)	Sumitranandan Pant	Hindi	Chidambara	Poetry	(Note: Awarded for Chidambara.)
1969 (5th)	Firaq Gorakhpuri	Urdu	Gul-e-Naghma	Poetry	(Note: Awarded for Gul-e-Naghma.)
1970 (6th)	Viswanatha Satyanarayana	Telugu	Ramayana Kalpavruksham	Epic	(Note: Awarded for Ramayana Kalpavrukshamu.)
1971 (7th)	Bishnu Dey	Bengali	Smriti Satta Bhabishyat	Poetry	(Note: Awarded for Smriti Satta Bhavishyat.)
1972 (8th)	Ramdhari Singh 'Dinkar'	Hindi	Urvashi	Poetry	(Note: Awarded for Urvashi.)
1973 (9th) †	D. R. Bendre	Kannada	Naaku Tanti	Poetry	(Note: Awarded for Nakutanti.)
1973 (9th) †	Gopinath Mohanty	Odia	Mati Matala (The Fertile Soil)	Novel	(Note: Awarded for Matimatal.)
1974 (10th)	Vishnu Sakharam Khandekar	Marathi	Yayati	Novel	(Note: Awarded for Yayati.)
1975 (11th)	Akilan	Tamil	Chitrai Pavai	Novel	(Note: Awarded for Chitttrappavai.)
1976 (12th)	Ashapoorna Devi	Bengali	Prothom Protishruti (The First Promise)	Novel	(Note: Awarded for Pratham Pratisruti.)
1977 (13th)	K. Shivaram Karanth	Kannada	Mookajjiya Kanasugalu (Dreams of Mookajji)	Novel	(Note: Awarded for Mookajjiya Kanasugalu.)
1978 (14th)	Sachchidananda Vatsyayan 'Agyeya'	Hindi	Kitni Navon Men Kitni Bar	Poetry	(Note: Awarded for Kitni Navon Men Kitni Bar.)
1979 (15th)	Birendra Kumar Bhattacharya	Assamese	Mrityunjay	Novel	(Note: Awarded for Mrityunjay.)
1980 (16th)	S. K. Pottekkatt	Malayalam	Oru Desathinte Katha (The Story of a Locale)	Novel	(Note: Awarded for Oru Desathinte Katha.)
1981 (17th)	Amrita Pritam	Punjabi	Kagaj te Canvas	Poetry	(Note: Awarded for Kagaj te Canvas.)
1982 (18th)	Mahadevi Varma	Hindi	Yāmā	Poetry	(Note: Awarded for Yāmā. In 1982, when Mahadevi Varma received it for her poetry collection Yāmā it did not adhere to the earlier criterion of recognizing a single work. Instead, it represented a collection of selected poems highlighting her overall contribution rather than a singular creation.)
1983 (19th)	Masti Venkatesha Iyengar	Kannada	Lifetime contribution		
1984 (20th)	Thakazhi Sivasankara Pillai	Malayalam	Lifetime contribution		
1985 (21st)	Pannalal Patel	Gujarati	Lifetime contribution		
1986 (22nd)	Sachidananda Routray	Odia	Lifetime contribution		
1987 (23rd)	Vishnu Vaman Shirwadkar 'Kusumagraj'	Marathi	Lifetime contribution		
1988 (24th)	C. Narayana Reddy	Telugu	Lifetime contribution		
1989 (25th)	Qurratulain Hyder	Urdu	Lifetime contribution		
1990 (26th)	Vinayaka Krishna Gokak	Kannada	Lifetime contribution		
1991 (27th)	Subhash Mukhopadhyay	Bengali	Lifetime contribution		
1992 (28th)	Naresh Mehta	Hindi	Lifetime contribution		
1993 (29th)	Sitakant Mahapatra	Odia	Lifetime contribution		
1994 (30th)	U. R. Ananthamurthy	Kannada	Lifetime contribution		
1995 (31st)	M. T. Vasudevan Nair	Malayalam	Lifetime contribution		
1996 (32nd)	Mahasweta Devi	Bengali	Lifetime contribution		
1997 (33rd)	Ali Sardar Jafri	Urdu	Lifetime contribution		
1998 (34th)	Girish Karnad	Kannada	Lifetime contribution		
1999 (35th) †	Nirmal Verma	Hindi	Lifetime contribution		
1999 (35th) †	Gurdial Singh	Punjabi	Lifetime contribution		
2000 (36th)	Mamoni Raisom Goswami	Assamese	Lifetime contribution		
2001 (37th)	Rajendra Shah	Gujarati	Lifetime contribution		
2002 (38th)	Jayakanthan	Tamil	Lifetime contribution		
2003 (39th)	Vinda Karandikar	Marathi	Lifetime contribution		
2004 (40th)	Rehman Rahi	Kashmiri	Lifetime contribution		
2005 (41st)	Kunwar Narayan	Hindi	Lifetime contribution		
2006 (42nd) †	Ravindra Kelekar	Konkani	Lifetime contribution		
2006 (42nd) †	Satya Vrat Shastri	Sanskrit	Lifetime contribution		
2007 (43rd)	O. N. V. Kurup	Malayalam	Lifetime contribution		
2008 (44th)	Akhlaq Mohammed Khan 'Shahryar'	Urdu	Lifetime contribution		
2009 (45th) †	Amarkant	Hindi	Lifetime contribution		
2009 (45th) †	Shrilal Shukla	Hindi	Lifetime contribution		
2010 (46th)	Chandrashekhara Kambara	Kannada	Lifetime contribution		
2011 (47th)	Pratibha Ray	Odia	Lifetime contribution		
2012 (48th)	Ravuri Bharadhwaja	Telugu	Lifetime contribution		
2013 (49th)	Kedarnath Singh	Hindi	Lifetime contribution		
2014 (50th)	Bhalchandra Nemade	Marathi	Lifetime contribution		
2015 (51st)	Raghuveer Chaudhari	Gujarati	Lifetime contribution		
2016 (52nd)	Shankha Ghosh	Bengali	Lifetime contribution		
2017 (53rd)	Krishna Sobti	Hindi	Lifetime contribution		
2018 (54th)	Amitav Ghosh	English	Lifetime contribution		
2019 (55th)	Akkitham Achuthan Namboothiri	Malayalam	Lifetime contribution		
2020 (56th)	Nilamani Phookan	Assamese	Lifetime contribution		
2022 (57th)	Damodar Mauzo	Konkani	Lifetime contribution		
2023 (58th) †	Rambhadracharya	Sanskrit	Lifetime contribution		
2023 (58th) †	Gulzar	Urdu	Lifetime contribution		
2024 (59th)	Vinod Kumar Shukla	Hindi	Lifetime contribution		
2025 (60th)	Vairamuthu	Tamil	Lifetime contribution		

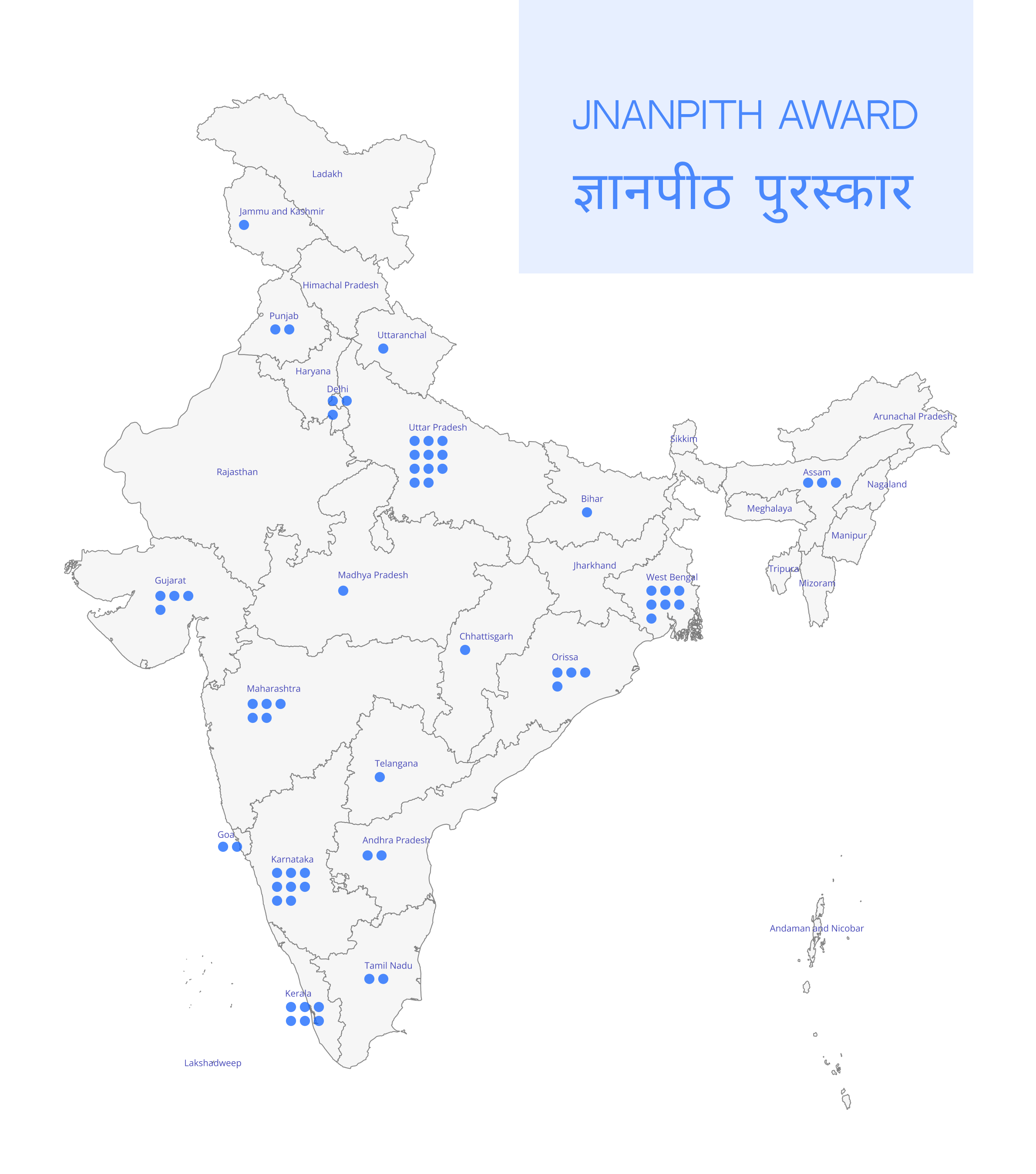
Jnanpith Award visualization on map

== Jnanpith recipients by language ==
Out of twenty-three eligible languages, the award has been presented for works in sixteen languages. The 66 Jnanpith awardees from 1965 to 2025 wrote in the following languages:

Language	Number
Hindi	12
Kannada	8
Bengali	6
Malayalam	6
Urdu	5
Gujarati	4
Marathi	4
Odia	4
Assamese	3
Tamil	3
Telugu	3
Konkani	2
Punjabi	2
Sanskrit	2
English	1
Kashmiri	1

By language family and branch:

Family	Branch	Number
Indo-European	Indo-Aryan	45
Indo-European	Germanic	1
Dravidian	South	17
Dravidian	South-Central	3

== See also ==
- Moortidevi Award, another annual literary honor, regarded as the second highest, and also awarded by the Bharatiya Jnanpith.
- Saraswati Samman, a similar literary award in Indian languages conferred by the K. K. Birla Foundation.

== Bibliography ==
- Sabharwal, Gopa (2007). India Since 1947: The Independent Years. Penguin Books India. p. 392. ISBN 978-0-14-310274-8.
