= Odakkuzhal (poetry collection) =

1950 collection of poems written by G. Sankara Kurup

- Author: G. Sankara Kurup
- Language: Malayalam
- Subjects: Symbolist lyrics
- Publisher: Mathrubhumi
- Publication date: 1950
- Publication place: India
- Media type: Print (Hardcover and Paperback), e-book at ReadWhere
- Pages: 211 pp.

Odakkuzhal is a collection of poems written by G. Sankara Kurup in Malayalam. It was published by Mathrubhumi in 1950. It won the first prestigious Jnanpith Award in 1965. The book consists of 60 symbolist lyrics.
