= H. Balasubramaniam =

Indian translator and multilingual scholar (1932–2021)

Prof. Dr. H. Balasubramaniam
- Born: 10 April 1932
- Died: 2 April 2021 (aged 88); Delhi

Harihara Iyer Balasubramaniam (10 April 1932 – 2 April 2021) was an Indian translator and multilingual scholar in Hindi, Tamil, Malayalam, Sanskrit and English. Balasubramaniam translated Tolkaappiyam and the poems of Subramania Bharati into Hindi.

He died from COVID-19 during the COVID-19 pandemic in India.

== Early life ==
Balasubramaniam was born on 10 April 1932, in Kayamkulam municipal village of Alappuzha district in present day Kerala. Father S.Harihara Iyer and mother P.Sivakami Ammal migrated to Thiruvananthapuram from Azhvarkurichchi of Tenkasi district, Tamil Nadu. Balasubramaniam’s younger brothers are H. Parameswaran and H. Padmanabhan were also multilingual scholars and were involved in Translation works. Younger sister Alamelu Krishnan is also a multilingual scholar and involved in translation works. He was also awarded Sahitya Akademi Award.

== Contributions to Hindi and Tamil literature ==
- ‘Jaag Utha Hai Kalbhairav (Hindi)’, a collection of poetry, Neeraj Book Centre, Delhi. (2000)
- ‘Kamyabi Ki Dastaan: Nalli, (Biography of Nalli Kuppusamy Chettiar in Hindi) Brain Bank, Chennai. (2008)
- Chinnappa Bharati Varga chetanaa ke jujhaaroo sahityakar - Compilation, (2011)
- Inthiya Mozhi Ilakkiya katturaikal (Tamil), Collection of 9 essays published in various books and magazines), New Century Book House, Chennai. (2014)

== Translation works ==
=== Tamil to Hindi ===
1. Kumari Nilacantan’s ‘August 15’ as ‘agast 15’, Notion Press, Chennai (2019)
2. Stalin Gunasekaran’s ‘Viduthalai velviyil tamizhagam’ as ‘Swatantrata yagya men Tamil Nadu’, Manitam pathippakam, Erode (2020)

=== Hindi to Tamil ===
1. Chandrasekhar Rath’s Novel ‘Yantrarudh’ as ‘Yanthira Vahanan’ Sahitya Akademi, New Delhi. (2007)
2. Amritlaal Naagar (Monograph by Shrilaal Shukla) Sahitya Academi, (2016)

=== Edited Tamil to Hindi ===
1. Uttar aur Dakshin: Sanskritik Samanvay (study) NCBH, Chennai (2017)
2. Bindu mein Sindhu, Vairamuthu’s poem, Sahitya Sahakar, Delhi. (2017)
3. Vairamuhtu hone ka matalab, Abhivyakti Prakashan, Delhi (2017)

=== Notable awards ===
1. Translation Prize for Tamil, Sahitya Akademi, New Delhi. (2002)
2. Kendriya Hindi Sansthan, Hindi Seva Samman conferred by the President of India (2011)
