= Manu Joseph =

Indian journalist and writer

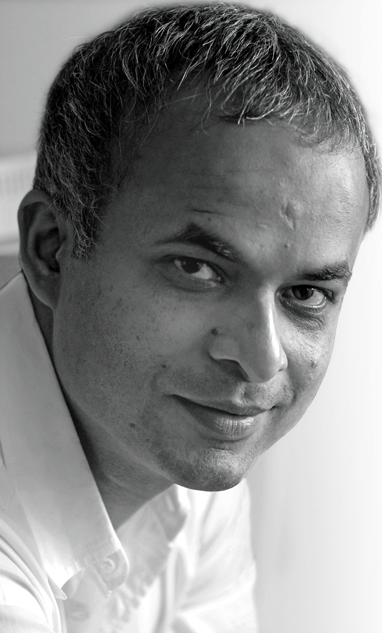
- Born: 22 July 1974 (age 52); Kottayam, Kerala, India
- Education: Loyola College, Chennai
- Occupations: Journalist; Writer; Author
- Children: 1

Manu Joseph (born 22 July 1974) is an Indian journalist and writer. He is the former editor of Open magazine. His debut novel Serious Men (2010) won The Hindu Literary Prize and the PEN Open Book Award and was later adapted as a film of the same name. His second novel, The Illicit Happiness of Other People (2012) was shortlisted for The Hindu Literary Prize in 2013.

== Life and career ==
Manu was born in Kottayam, Kerala, and grew up in Chennai. His father, Joseph Madappally, is a film-maker who directed the Malayalam film Thoranam (1987). He is a graduate of Loyola College, Chennai, and dropped out of Madras Christian College to become a staff writer at Society magazine. He is a former editor of Open magazine, and a columnist for The International New York Times and The Hindustan Times. In 2007, he was a Chevening Scholar. He currently lives in Delhi.

His debut novel Serious Men (2010) won The Hindu Literary Prize and the PEN Open Book Award. It has been adapted by Sudhir Mishra as a feature film of the same name.

His second novel, The Illicit Happiness of Other People, was published in September 2012. He also wrote the screenplay for the film Love Khichdi (2009).

In January 2014, Manu resigned as editor of Open magazine.

Manu is the creator and writer of Decoupled, an Indian English-language comedy web series, which was released on Netflix on 17 December 2021.

== Awards and honours ==
- 2010: The Hindu Literary Prize won for Serious Men
- 2010: Man Asian Literary Prize shortlisted for Serious Men
- 2010: Huffington Post′s 10 best books of the year for Serious Men
- 2011: Bollinger Everyman Wodehouse Prize shortlisted for Serious Men
- 2011: PEN Open Book Award won for Serious Men
- 2013: The Hindu Literary Prize shortlisted for The Illicit Happiness of Other People

== Works ==
- Joseph, Manu (2010). Serious Men (hardcover 1st ed.). HarperCollins India. ISBN 9788172238520.
- —— (2012). The Illicit Happiness of Other People (hardcover 1st ed.). Fourth Estate. ISBN 9789350293645.
- —— (2017). Miss Laila, Armed and Dangerous (hardcover 1st ed.). Myriad Editions. ISBN 9789352770441.
- —— (2025). Why the Poor Don’t Kill Us: The Psychology of Indians (hardcover 1st ed.). Aleph Book Company (published 5 August 2025). ISBN 9789365234572.
