= Prothom Protishruti =

1964 Bengali novel by Ashapurna Devi

Prothom Protisruti
- Cover page of English translation
- Author: Ashapurna Devi
- Original title: প্রথম প্রতিশ্রুতি
- Translator: Indira Chowdhury
- Language: Bengali
- Genre: Feminist novel
- Publication date: 1964
- Publication place: India
- English publication date: 2004
- Awards: Rabindra Puraskar (1965); Jnanpith Award (1976)
- OCLC: 56904843
- Dewey Decimal: 891.44371
- LC Class: PK1718.A8

Prothom Protishruti (pronounced [prɒθɒm prɒtɪʃrʊtɪ]; transl. The First Promise), also spelled Pratham Pratishruti, is a 1964 Bengali novel by Ashapurna Devi. Considered to be Devi's magnum opus, it tells a story of Satyabati who was given away in marriage at the age of eight to maintain the social norms, and was kept under strict surveillance of brahmanical regulations. The novel narrates Satyabati's struggle to fight against family control, mental violence of the polygamy system, and social prejudices in patriarchal society. It won Rabindra Puraskar in 1965 and Jnanpith Award in 1976.

== Background ==
I have thought and written mostly about women because I have seen their helplessness and that is what I know best. Over the years, great clouds of protest have accumulated, unexpressed in my mind, and Satyabati, the heroine of my novel is the expression of that protest.

— Ashapurna Devi

The title Prothom Protishruti (First Promise) refers to the promise Satyabati, the protagonist, has made to educate her daughter Subarna and in which she failed. Critic Madhuri Chatterjee noted that the title also can be interpreted in positive terms — it could be the promise with which Satyabati leaves her household to demand answers regarding the position of women.

== Characters ==
Spanning 48 chapters, the novel has about 50 characters. Principle characters are:

- Ramkali Chatterjee – a priest and an Ayurveda doctor
- Satyabati – Ramkali's daughter
- Nabakumar – Satyabati's husband
- Subarna – Satyabati's daughter
- Sadhan and Saral – Satyabati's sons
- Shankari – one of the widow members in the family
- Nagen – Shankari's paramour
- Suhasini – Shankari's illegitimate daughter
- Bhabatosh – teacher of Nabakumar, turned 'Brahmo'
- Sarada – wife of Rashbehari, Ramkali's nephew

== Plot ==
The novel is set in a remote village of undivided Bengal and thereafter Kolkata. Its theme focuses on a social structure that is based on superstition, prejudice and injustice to women. Satyabati, the housewife protagonist, rebels against the patriarchal world in which she and many of the women lived, taking an active role in standing up to the people whose behavior is one of keeping women in their traditional place of inferiority. From childhood Satya is outspoken. She points out the unfairness of the society in a very facile way.

The protagonist of the story is the handsome Ramkali Chatterjee, who, sometime towards the final decades of the 19th century, combines the functions of priest and physician of the traditional Ayurveda system of medicine in an isolated Bengali village, Five of the women of his extended family — Dinatarini, Kashiswari, Shankari, Shibjaya and Mokshada are widows. It is on them that the burden falls, from dawn to dusk, of attending to all the practical problems of running a home. They are obliged to adhere strictly to the rules governing widowhood, rules which however they reinforce by insisting other female members of the family learn to observe in a society dominated by men. Of the other women, just one, the young Satyabati, defies custom, and though her father treats her manner of bucking the system indulgently, the other women rebuke her. Ramkali takes her on as a student.

Meanwhile, one of Ramkali's nephews, Rashbehari, following the obligations imposed on a kulin Brahmin, is obliged to undertake a second marriage, which his first wife, Sarada vigorously protests by threatening to kill herself. A s a result, her husband refrains from sleeping with the second wife. The other, jealous women of the house resent Sarada's success in blackmail her spouse, and manage to persuade Rashbehari to sleep with the second wife. Things are even more complicated after one of the five widows, Shankari elopes with the man who was wooing her, Nagen, something which brings the whole family into disgrace. To top the sequence off, Ramnkali's own house is partially destroyed by fire.

On her reaching puberty, Satyabati, now married to Nabakumar, is transferred to the home of her parents-in-law where she is treated mercilessly by the mother-in-law. Her husband, who has enlightened views thanks to his teacher Bhabatosh, asks Ramkali to take her away in order to avoid her dying by torture. But, Satyabati prefers to stay on a fight for her rights, no matter how much abuse and maltreatment is handed out to her. When her husband falls ill, she manages, now the mother of two children, to have him treated by a European doctor who manages to pull him through his illness. She then manoeuvers a job for Nabakumar in Calcutta, determined by the move out of the village to secure a good modern education for her sons, while she too begins a secret life as teacher in a girls' school where she encounters Shankari and her illegitimate daughter. Suhasini, working as a cook for a wealthy family, is shocked by being recognized, commits suicide, leaving her daughter Suhasini an orphan. The men of that wealthy household customarily rape their servants, being abetted in this by the other women in their group, and Satyabati manages to save her by taking her away and putting her in a school where she too develops a strong personality.

Nabakumar dislikes his wife's philanthropic assistance to people outside their closed family, however. This outlook is shared by their sons. Now somewhat late in life, Satyabati becomes pregnant and falls seriously ill. Soudamini, a woman who had been abandoned by her husband Mukanda, is brought in to nurse her, though at the same time she speaks hostilely of Suhasini. Mukanda, meeting up with Soudamini there, desires to take her back, a proposal she accepts with alacrity. Suhasini, upset by the smears, seeks refuge with Nabakumar's teacher Bhabatosh, and when the latter asks Satyabati, is advised to marry her, which he does. Under his care and tutelage, Suhasini becomes a teacher. Satyabati gives birth to her daughter Subarnalata who, eight years later, is sent to study at the school where Suhasini teaches, while the two sons become, respectively a doctor and a lawyer and Satyabati tries to have the eldest married to an educated woman. Her husband opposes this, and has him married off in the traditional manner, while getting his own daughter Subarnalata betrothed, even while she is still a young girl. Satyabati refuses to attend the son's marriage, abandons the village and plans to go to Ramkali to discuss important questions about what has happened.

== Reception ==
Prothom Protishruti is the most acclaimed work of Ashapurna Devi, and is considered to be one of the foremost novels in Bengali literature.

Critic Mukul Guha praised the novel for its 'realistic dialogue' and 'charming narration'. Critic Madhuri Chatterjee called it 'a feminist text', as its protagonist Satyabati always has a growing awareness of women's position and she does not always accept society's valuation of them.

Prothom Protishruti was translated into English from Bengali as The First Promise (2004) by Indira Chowdhury. It was adapted into Hindi television series by the same name in 1987.

== Awards ==
It was selected for Rabindra Puraskar for 1965 and Jnanpith Award for 1976.

== Sources ==
- Datta, Dipannita (2015). Ashapurna Devi and Feminist Consciousness in Bengal: A Bio-critical Reading. Oxford University Press. ISBN 978-0-19-809999-4. (subscription required)
