= Padikkadha Medhai =

1960 film by A. Bhimsingh

- Theatrical release poster
- Directed by: A. Bhimsingh
- Screenplay by: A. Bhimsingh; K. S. Gopalakrishnan (dialogues)
- Story by: Ashapurna Devi
- Produced by: N. Krishnaswamy
- Starring: Sivaji Ganesan; S. V. Ranga Rao; Kannamba; Sowcar Janaki
- Cinematography: G. Vittal Rao
- Edited by: A. Bhimsingh
- Music by: K. V. Mahadevan
- Production company: Bala Movies
- Release date: 25 June 1960
- Running time: 164 minutes
- Country: India
- Language: Tamil

Padikkadha Medhai (transl. The uneducated genius) is a 1960 Indian Tamil-language drama film directed and co-written by A. Bhimsingh. The film stars Sivaji Ganesan, S. V. Ranga Rao, Kannamba and Sowcar Janaki. It is a remake of the 1953 Bengali film Jog Biyog, itself based on the novel of the same name by Ashapurna Devi. The film was released on 25 June 1960 and became a commercial success. It was remade in Telugu as Aatma Bandhuvu (1962), with Ranga Rao and Kannamba reprising their roles, and in Hindi by A. Bhimsingh as Mehrban (1967).

== Plot ==
Rao Bahadur Chandrasekar, a wealthy stockbroker, lives with his wife Parvathi, three sons (Thyagu, Sridhar and Raghu), their wives and two daughters (one widowed and another unmarried). Rangan, an uneducated and naïve orphan, is raised as a family member and he in return is very dedicated to this family, especially his adopters – Chandrasekar and Parvathi. Parvathi promises her dying poor friend that her friend's daughter Lakshmi would be married to Parvathi's son. But since her son loves another woman, Rangan agrees to marry Lakshmi to keep up Parvathi's word. On the day of his younger daughter's betrothal, Chandrasekar loses heavily in the stock market. The engagement is cancelled by the groom's greedy father after he sees the sudden change in the family's fortunes. The fate of the house changes dramatically as the creditors storm the house, demanding repayment of their money. The sons' behaviour also changes drastically.

Though Raghu and Lakshmi take good care of Chandrasekar and Parvathi, the other family members insult them now and falsely accuse Lakshmi of stealing valuables. Lakshmi pleads with Rangan to leave the household, but he refuses. Understanding the situation, Chandrasekar and Parvathi forcibly send Rangan and Lakshmi away to enable them to live in peace, away from the turmoil. The naïve Rangan leaves and obtains work in a factory. He saves money to gift Chandrasekar his favourite cigars which he could not live without. When Rangan presents the cigars, he is reprimanded for being a spendthrift by Chandrasekar's family. Rangan leaves with a broken heart.

Rangan misses Chandrasekar's family and tries to come to their help on every occasion. Chandrasekar gets entangled in more litigation, and soon dies on account of the stress. Parvathi is neglected by her children; when she falls ill, Rangan gets her treated. The creditors announce a public auction of Chandrasekar's house to recover their dues, and the sons do nothing to save their house. Rangan saves the factory owner's son (whose engagement to Chandrasekar's daughter had been cancelled) from an accident. The owner offers Rangan money, but he makes him realise that money is not everything; with Lakshmi, he convinces him to have his son marry Chandrasekar's younger daughter. The owner buys Chandrasekar's house in the auction and gifts it to Rangan for saving his son, who in turn gives it to Chandrasekar's family. Rangan unites everyone and gets appreciation for his unconditional love for the family.

== Cast ==
Male cast

- Sivaji Ganesan as Rangan
- S. V. Ranga Rao as Rao Bahadur Chandrasekar
- T. S. Durairaj as Kundupillai
- T. R. Ramachandran as Raghu
- T. K. Balachandran as Geetha's husband
- S. A. Ashokan as Thyagu
- Muthuraman as Sridhar

Female cast

- Kannamba as Parvathi
- Sowcar Janaki as Lakshmi
- E. V. Saroja as Geetha
- Sandhya as Thyagu's wife
- Sundari Bai as Rajamma
- T. P. Muthulakshmi as Ranjitham
- Sivakami as Sridhar's wife
- C. I. D. Sakunthala

== Production ==
Padikkadha Medhai is a remake of the 1953 Bengali film Jog Biyog, based on the novel of the same name by Ashapurna Devi. After producer N. Krishnasamy bought the rights to remake the film in Tamil, he approached C. V. Sridhar to write the dialogues. Sridhar, after watching Jog Biyog, declined Krishnasamy's offer, citing scheduling conflicts and concealing his dislike of the film, and instead recommended his then assistant K. S. Gopalakrishnan. Sivaji Ganesan agreed to star in the remake after being impressed by Jog Biyog. He also recommended A. Bhimsingh as director. The producer initially wanted a glamorous actress to play the female lead, but Gopalakrishnan suggested Sowcar Janaki and threatened to leave if she was not signed. Bhimsingh gave Gopalakrishnan complete freedom while writing the dialogues.

== Soundtrack ==
The music was composed by K. V. Mahadevan. The song "Engiruntho Vanthan", set in Madhyamavati raga, is based on Subramania Bharati's poem of the same name.

Song	Singers	Lyrics	Length
"Aadi Pizhaithaalum Paadi Pizhaithaalum"	P. Leela	A. Maruthakasi	04:20
"Engiruntho Vanthan"	Sirkazhi Govindarajan	Mahakavi Bharathiyar	03:16
"Inba Malargal Poothu"	P. Susheela; L. R. Eswari	A. Maruthakasi	03:25
"Ore Oru Oorile"	T. M. Soundararajan; Soolamangalam Rajalakshmi	Kannadasan	04:09
"Padithathanal Arivu"	M. S. Rajeswari	Kannadasan	02:52
"Seevi Mudichu Singarichu"	T. M. Soundararajan	A. Maruthakasi	03:58
"Pakkathile Kanni Pen"	A. L. Raghavan; K. Jamuna Rani	A. Maruthakasi	03:00
"Ulladhai Solven"	T. M. Soundararajan	Kannadasan	03:09
"Vindhaiyinum Periya Vindhaiyadi"	P. Leela	A. Maruthakasi	03:20
"Ore Oru Oorile"	T. M. Soundararajan	Kannadasan	01:23

== Release and reception ==
Padikkadha Medhai was released on 25 June 1960. The Indian Express positively reviewed the film, particularly for Ganesan's performance. Kanthan of Kalki appreciated Gopalakrishnan's dialogues and the performances of the various cast members, including Ganesan's, but criticised the music, saying "Ore Oru Oorile" was the only memorable song. Ananda Vikatan said that though everyone did a good job, it was Ganesan's acting which stays in their eyes even after the reviewer left the theatre. C. V. Sridhar appreciated Gopalakrishnan for learning the art of converting a script into success. The film was a commercial success, running for over 100 days in theatres.

== Legacy ==
Padikkadha Medhai is considered a trendsetter in Tamil cinema for films where a faithful uneducated servant helps the family in times of dire need and thus brings a change in their fortunes, demonstrating that education is not needed for a good character. Films which followed the trend include Muthu Engal Sothu (1983), Vaazhkai (1984), Per Sollum Pillai (1987) and Ponmana Selvan (1989).

== Bibliography ==
- Dhananjayan, G. (2011). The Best of Tamil Cinema, 1931 to 2010: 1931–1976. Galatta Media. OCLC 733724281.
- Saravanan, M. (2013) [2005]. AVM 60 Cinema (in Tamil) (3rd ed.). Rajarajan Pathippagam. OCLC 1158347612.
