= Mehrban =

1967 film by A. Bhimsingh

- Poster
- Directed by: A. Bhimsingh
- Screenplay by: A. Bhimsingh; Rajendra Krishan (dialogues)
- Story by: Ashapurna Devi
- Produced by: A. V. Meiyappan
- Starring: Ashok Kumar; Sunil Dutt; Nutan; Mehmood; Shashikala
- Cinematography: A. Vincent
- Edited by: A. Paul Duraisingam
- Music by: Ravi
- Production company: AVM Productions
- Distributed by: Vidyut
- Release date: 21 April 1967
- Running time: 164 minutes
- Country: India
- Language: Hindi

Mehrban (transl. The Merciful) is a 1967 Indian Hindi-language drama film written and directed by A. Bhimsingh, and produced by A. V. Meiyappan. It is a remake of the 1953 Bengali film Jog Biyog, based on the novel of the same name by Ashapurna Devi. The film stars Ashok Kumar, Sunil Dutt, Nutan, Mehmood, Shashikala and Sulochana Latkar. It was released on 21 April 1967.

== Plot ==
Shanti Swarup, a wealthy businessman, lives with his three sons Ram, Shyam, and Sunder; his wife Parvati; widowed daughter Devki; unmarried daughter Geeta; and adopted orphan Kanhaiya. Kanhaiya is raised as Shanti Swarup's family member and he in return is very dedicated to this family, especially his adopters – Shanti and Parvati. They come across Laxmi whose parents, known to the Swarups, died and so they also bring Laxmi into their family. Parvati wants Sunder to marry Laxmi, but Sunder wants to marry his lover Rachna. Eventually, Kanhaiya marries Laxmi and Sundar marries Rachna.

Shanti arranges for Geeta to marry Ramesh, the son of his friend Lala Karamchand. Financial losses cause Shanti to lose all his wealth. Ram and Shyam refuse to help him at all, and Karamchand cancels the impending marriage. Kanhaiya and Laxmi leave the house due to the insistence of Shanti to make him self-dependent and also ill-treatment by his sons. But they are given shelter by Laxmis long-lost brother Madhu who doesn't reveal his identity to Laxmi. Disheartened, depressed and unable to face anyone, Shanti dies. Even as his palatial house is to be auctioned by Karamchand, who is voracious, a devastated Parvati is on her deathbed as she cannot think of living anywhere else, and only a miracle can save the now ruined family.

Kanhaiya saves Karamchand's son Ramesh from a car accident. Thus Karamchand gives the palatial house in favour of Kanhaiya and on turn reunites with the family and fulfils the wishes of Shanti Swaroop.

== Cast ==
- Ashok Kumar as Shanti Swaroop
- Sunil Dutt as Kanhaiya
- Nutan as Laxmi
- Mehmood as Madhu
- Shashikala as Devki
- Sulochana Latkar as Parvati

== Production ==
Mehrban was written and directed by A. Bhimsingh and produced by A. V. Meiyappan under AVM Productions. It was remade from Bhimsingh's own Tamil film Padikkadha Medhai (1960), which itself was a remake of the Bengali film Jog Biyog, based on the novel of the same name by Ashapurna Devi. The dialogues were written by Rajendra Krishan. A. K. Sekhar was the art director, A. Paul Duraisingam was the editor, and A. Vincent was cinematographer.

== Soundtrack ==
The soundtrack was composed by Ravi and the lyrics by Rajinder Krishan.

No.	Title	Singers	Length
1.	"Aye Mere Dost"	Mohammed Rafi	5:56
2.	"Saari Duniyamen"	Lata Mangeshkar	3:26
3.	"Aayega Aayega"	Mohammed Rafi	3:56
4.	"Title Music" (Instrumental)		2:14
5.	"Ek Raja Ki"	Lata Mangeshkar; Mohammed Rafi	6:27
6.	"Mera Gadha"	Mohammed Rafi	4:25
7.	"Sawan Ki Raat"	Asha Bhosle	3:27
8.	"Theme Music" (Instrumental)

== Release ==
Mehrban was released on 21 April 1967, and was distributed by Vidyut.

== Bibliography ==
- Elley, Derek (1977). World Filmography: 1967. Fairleigh Dickinson University Press. ISBN 978-0-498-01565-6.
- Saravanan, M. (2013) [2005]. AVM 60 Cinema (in Tamil) (3rd ed.). Rajarajan Pathippagam. OCLC 1158347612.
