= Ashapurna Devi =

Indian writer (8 January 1909)

- Born: 8 January 1909; Potoldanga, Calcutta, Bengal Presidency, British India
- Died: 12 July 1995 (aged 86); Calcutta, West Bengal, India
- Occupations: Novelist, poet
- Writing career
- Language: Bengali
- Period: 1939–1995
- Genre: Fiction
- Notable works: Prothom Protishruti; Subarnolata; Bakul Katha
- Notable awards: Jnanpith Award; Padma Shri; Sahitya Akademi Fellowship

Ashapurna Devi (Bengali pronunciation: [aʃapurna debi]; 8 January 1909 – 12 July 1995), also Ashapoorna Devi or Ashapurna Debi, was a prominent Indian novelist and poet in Bengali. In 1976, she was awarded the Jnanpith Award and Padma Shri by the Government of India, D.Litt. by the Universities of Jabalpur, Rabindra Bharati, Burdwan and Jadavpur. Vishwa Bharati University honoured her with Deshikottam in 1989. For her contribution as a novelist and short story writer, the Sahitya Akademi conferred its highest honour, the Sahitya Akademi Fellowship, in 1994.

== Biography ==
Ashapurna Devi was born in a Baidya family on 8 January 1909 in North Calcutta. Her ancestral house is Gupta Bari, Begampur, in Hooghly district of West Bengal. Her birth name was Asha Purna Devi (Gupta). Her early childhood was spent in a traditional and extremely conservative family. Female children of the house were not allowed to go to school. Private tutors were employed only for the boys. It is said that as a baby Ashapurna used to listen to the readings of her brothers sitting opposite to them and that was how she learnt the alphabets. Though Ashapurna had no formal education as such, she was self-educated.

Ashapurna's father Harendra Nath Gupta was a famous artist of the time who worked for furniture makers C. Lazarus & Co. as a designer. Ashapurna's mother Sarola Sundari was a great lover of books. It was her "intensive thirst" for reading classics and story books which was transmitted to Ashapurna and her sisters in their early age.

Due to shortage of space, Harendra Nath shifted his family to a new house at 157/1B Acharya Prafulla Chandra Road (beside the Khanna Cinema Hall), which provided freedom to Sarola Sundari and her daughters to read according to their heart's desires. To satisfy Sarola Sundari's tremendous urge of reading there had been a continuous flow of books and magazines from the libraries of the time. As there was no dearth of leisure for the daughters and no bar to reading adult books from a very early age, Ashapurna and her sisters built a love-relationship with books. The period in which Ashapurna was raised was socially and politically restless, a time of nationalist agitation and awakening. Though the children of Harendra Nath did not have direct contact with the outside world, they were quite sensitive to the restlessness going on throughout the country led by Mahatma Gandhi and other political leaders who were ready to sacrifice their lives to bring independence. Thus different factors were responsible for nourishing the specific culture which guided Ashapurna from her early childhood to youth, and carried her to a definite platform through various experiences and ideals of life.

According to Ashapurna, she and her sisters used to compete with each other by composing and reciting poems. This inspired Ashapurna to secretly send a poem to Sishu Sathi in 1922. Ashapurna was thirteen and her poem "Bairer Dak" (The Call from the Outside) was published. She also received a request from editor Rajkumar Chakravorty to send more poems and stories. That was the beginning which developed into a never-ending flourish for Ashapurna, culminating into a permanent place for her into the realm of Bengali literature.

Ashapurna was sent to be married in 1924 when she was 15, leaving Calcutta for her betrothed's family residence in Krishnanagar. She was married to Kalidas Gupta, and the couple moved frequently as they established themselves. In 1927 they settled in Calcutta where they lived until 1960. They then had to shift to a separate flat near Golpark with their only son Sushanta, daughter-in-law Nupur, and a granddaughter Shatarupa. Later, in 1967, another granddaughter, Shatadeepa, was added to the family. In 1970, Kalidas Gupta and Ashapurna built their own house in Garia at 17 Kanungo Park. Ashapurna lived there until she died on 13 July 1995.

In the beginning of her writing career, Ashapurna wrote only for children – Chhoto Thakurdar Kashi Yatra (Great Uncle Goes to Varanasi) was the first printed edition published in 1938, followed by others throughout her literary career.

In 1936, she first wrote a story for adults, "Patni O Preyoshi", published in the Puja issue of Ananda Bazar Patrika. Prem O Prayojan was her first novel for adults, published in 1944. Her magnum opus, the trilogy Pratham Pratishruti (1964), Subarnolata (1967) and Bakul Katha (1974), symbolises an endless struggle for women to achieve equal rights. According to Somak Ghoshal, writing for Mint, "Ashapurna Devi wrote about women and men whose lives were claustrophobically restricted by social, economic and psychological conditions."

Upon her death, she had been widely honoured with a number of prizes and awards. In January 2009, Doordarshan broadcast a documentary about her, and a two-day event was organized to celebrate what would have been her 101st birthday.

== Accolades ==
- The Lila Prize from the University of Calcutta (1954)
- The Bhuban Mohini Das Gold Medal (1966)
- The Rabindra Award from the Government of West Bengal (1966)
- The Jnanpith Award (1976) from the Government of India, for the novel Prothom Protishruti
- The Haranath Ghosh Medal from the Bangiya Sahitya Parishad (1988)
- The Jagattarini Gold Medal from the University of Calcutta (1993)

== Publications ==
=== Novels ===
1. Aar Ek Ashapurna (Mitra O Ghosh)
2. Agniparikha (Mitra O Ghosh)
3. Asha Purna Devir Rachanaboli [in 10 volumes] (Mitra O Ghosh)
4. Asha Purna Bithika (Nirmal Sahityam)
5. Anamaniyaa (Karuna Prakashani)
6. Biswas Abiswas (Deb Sahitya Kutir)
7. Chabibandha Sinduk (Mitra O Ghosh)
8. Chitrakalpa (Mitra O Ghosh)
9. Chosma Palte Jai (Deb Sahitya Kutir)
10. Dibyahasini'r Dinolipi (Mitra O Ghosh)
11. Drishya Theke Drishyantore (Mitra O Ghosh)
12. Dwitiyo Adwitiyo (Nirmal Sahityam)
13. Ei To Sedin (Ananda Publishers)
14. Kalyani (Nirmal Sahityam)
15. Ka(n)ta Pukur Lane'r Komola (Deb Sahitya Kutir)
16. Laghu Tripodi (Puspo)
17. Lila Chirontan (Mitra O Ghosh)
18. Nakhyatrer Akash (Nirmal Sahityam)
19. Noksha Kata Ghor (Karuna Prakashoni)
20. Pancha Nodir Teere (Pal Publishers)
21. Prem O Proyojon (Punascha, Nirmal Sahityam)
22. Priyo Galpo (Nirmal Sahityam)
23. Sashi Babu'r Sangsar (Punascha)
24. Siri Bhanga Anka (Mitra O Ghosh)
25. Shrimti Sat(m)a Jibon (Karuna Prakashani)
26. Sthan Kaal Patra (Karuna Prakashani)
27. Tin Prohor (Baluchori, Sunglass, Srinkholita) (Nirmal Sahityam)
28. Trimatrik (Nirmal Sahityam)
29. V.I.P Bari'r Lok (Karuna Prakashani)

==== Shottoboti Trilogy ====
1. Prothom Protisruti (Mitra O Ghosh, 1964)
2. Shubornolawta (Mitra O Ghosh, 1967)
3. Bokul Kawtha (Mitra O Ghosh, 1974)

=== Rochonaboli ===
Her rochonaboli (collected works) are published in 10 volumes from publisher Mitra O Ghosh.

==== Rochonaboli, Vol. 1 ====
1. "Boloygras" (1952)
2. "Jog Biyog" (1953)
3. "Nirjon Prithibi" (1956)
4. "Charpotra" (1960)
5. "Prothom Lagna"
6. "Samudra Neel Akash Neel" (1960)
7. "Uttorlipi" (1960)
8. "Teenchanda"
9. "Mukhor Ratri" (1961)

==== Rochonaboli, Vol. 2 ====
1. "Agni Parikha" (1952)
2. "Alor Sakhor"
3. "Jibon Swad"
4. "Aaar Ek Jhor"
5. "Nodi Deek Hara"
6. "Ekti Sondhya Ekti Sokal"
7. "Uttoron"
8. "Johuri"
9. "Mayajaal"
10. unpublished short stories
11. unpublished non-fiction

==== Rochonaboli, Vol. 3 ====
1. Prem O Prayojan (1944)
2. "Nabajonma" (1960)
3. Sashi Babu'r Sangsar (1956)
4. "Unmochon" (1957)
5. "Bahironga"
6. "Begboti"
7. "Abohosangeet"
8. unpublished short stories
9. unpublished poetries

==== Rochonaboli, Vol. 4 ====
1. "Nepothyo Nayika"
2. "Jonom Jonom ke Sathi"
3. Laghu Tripodi
4. "Du ye Mile Ek" (Srinkholita and Sunglass)
5. "Suktisagar"
6. "Sukherchabi"
7. "Suyoranir Sadh"
8. "Surobhi Sopno"
9. unpublished short stories
10. unpublished non-fiction

==== Rochonaboli, Vol. 5 ====
1. "Mayadarpan"
2. "Brittopoth"
3. "Mittirbari"
4. "Atikranto"
5. "Sonar Horin"
6. "Uro Pakhi"
7. "Jugal Bondi"
8. "Sesh Raai"

==== Rochonaboli, Vol. 6 ====
1. Kokhono Deen Kokhono Raat
2. Baluchori
3. Anobogunthita
4. unpublished short stories

==== Rochonaboli, Vol. 7 ====
1. "Bijoyi Basanta"
2. "Ditio Adhyay"
3. "Neel Porda"
4. "Durer Janla"
5. "Juganter Jobonika Pare"
6. "Dui Meru"
7. unpublished short stories

==== Rochonaboli, Vol. 8 ====
1. Prothom Pratisruti (First Part)
2. "Polatok Sainik"
3. "Pratikhar Bagan"
4. "Jhinuk e Sei Tara"
5. unpublished short stories

==== Rochonaboli, Vol. 9 ====
1. Prothom Pratishruti (Last Part) (1964)
2. Subarnalata (1967)

==== Rochonaboli, Vol. 10 ====
1. Bakul Katha (1974)
2. "Balir Niche Dhew"
3. unpublished short stories

=== Works for younger readers ===
1. Aloy Adityer IcchaPatra Rahosyo (Ananda Publishers, 1995)
2. Amorabatir Antorale (1994)
3. Byaparta Ki Holo (1993)
4. Bhaggi Juddho Bedhechilo (1986)
5. Bhagyolakhi Lotarry (1990)
6. Bhitore Ki Chilo (1985)
7. Bhuture Kukur (1982)
8. Bolber Moto Noi (1987)
9. Cha(j)jone Mile (1979)
10. Chutite Chotachuti (1982)
11. Chotoder Srestho Golpo (1955)
12. Chotoder Shresto Golpo (1981)
13. Chotto Thakurdar Kashijatra (1938)
14. Chotoder Bhalo Bhalo Golpo (1962)
15. Dakaat r Kobole Ami (1972)
16. Dibbosundarer Dibbogayan luv (1988)
17. Doshti Kishore Uponyas (Ananda Publishers)
18. Durer Basi (1978)
19. Ek Kuri Golpo (1988)
20. Ek Samudra onek Dheu (1963)
21. Eker Modhe Teen (1991)
22. Gaja Ukil Er Hatya Rahasya (Ananda Publishers, 1979)
23. Golpo Bhalo Aber Bolo (1958)
24. Golpo Holo Suru (1955)
25. Golper Moto Golpo (1961)
26. Half-Holiday (1941)
27. Hasir Golpo (1967)
28. Jibon Kalir Pakka Hiseb (1985)
29. Jugalratno Tiktiki Office (1992)
30. Kanakdeep (1962)
31. Karapaker Pakchakra (Karuna Prakashani, 1997)
32. Kato Kando Railgarite (1985)
33. Kishore Amonibaas (1986)
34. Kishore Bachai Golpo (1999)
35. Kisor Sahityo Samagro (1983)
36. Kishore Sahitya Samagro (1–3) (Mitra O Ghosh)
37. Kisor Sahityo Samvar (1980)
38. Kopal Khule Gelo Naki (1992)
39. Majarumama (1992)
40. Manikchand O Aro Choddo (1992)
41. Manuser Mato Manus (1986)
42. Mon Thaklei Mon Kamon (1996)
43. Nije Bujhe Nin (1987)
44. Nikharchai Amod (1982)
45. Onara Thakbeni (1982)
46. Pa(n)ch Bhuter Goppo (Punascha, 1990)
47. Panchasti Kishore Galpo (Nirmal Sahityam)
48. Pakhi Theke Hati (1983)
49. Planchet (Karuna Prakashani, 1999)
50. Poyela Doshra (1992)
51. Rajkumarer Poshake (Ananda Publishers, 1975)
52. Rahasyer Sandhaane (Nirmal Sahityam, 1981)
53. Raja Noi Rani Noi (1959)
54. Rajai Golpo (1976)
55. Rani Mayabatir Antardhyan Rahosyo (1993)
56. Ro(n)gin Molat (1941)
57. Sakaler Sapno (1994)
58. Sarojanter Nayak (1992)
59. Satyi Amod (1992)
60. Sei Sob Golpo (1967)
61. Sera Baro (1988)
62. Sera Rahasyo Samvar (1984)
63. Shanirbachito Chotoder Shesto Golpo (1996)
64. Shono Shono Golpo Shono (Deb Sahitya Kutir, 1956)

=== Stories published in children's magazines ===
- "Anko Sir o Mozart" (Sarodiya Anondomela, 1995)
- "Bhagye Thakle Kina Hoi" (Uponyas)
- "Bishe Bishkhay"
- "Bhut Namaibar Sahoj Podhdhoti" (Sarodiya Anondomela, 1986)
- "Chutite Chotachuti" (Uponyas, Sarodiya Anondomela, 1981)
- "Ghya(N)ch Kore"
- "Kagaj To Paro Na" (Sarodiya Anondomela, 1985)
- "Kichhu Korena Kichhu Korbe Na" (Agomoni, Deb Sahitya Kutir)
- "Matra Ekkhana Than Eet"
- "Muskil Asan er Kolkathi" (Sarodiya Anondomela, 1989)
- "Parar chhele" (Sarodiya Anondomela, 1987)
- "Swapner Railgari" (Boro Golpo, Sarodiya Anondomela, 1983)
- "Tibboti Lamar Coffin" (Sarodiya Anondomela, 1993)

=== Pakhik Anondomela Golpo Sankalan ===
- "Tiktiki, Ateendriyo Shakti o Bedanto Bardhan" (11 January 1989, illustration – Krishnendu Chaki)
- "Kopaal'er Naam Gopaal" (9 June 1993, illustration – Debashish Deb)
- "Mojaru-Mama" (17 October 1984, illustration – Anup Roy)
- "Ninkhonj Niruddesh Hote Gele" (7 January 1987, illustration – Krishnendu Chaki)

=== PujaBarshiki Anondomela Golpo Sankalan ===
- Bahadur (Sarodiya Anondomela, 1971)
- Hoito Eirokomi (Sarodiya Anondomela, 1992)
- Char Buror Adda (Sarodiya Anondomela, 1996)

=== Kishore Uponyas (preteen novels) ===
- Raajkumar Er Poshake (Anandomela)
- Gaja Ukil Er Hotya Rohosya (Anandomela)
- Bhuture Kukur (Anandomela)
- Lonka Morich O Ek Mohamanab (Pakhyik Anandamela, March 1983)
- Manusher Moto Manush (Sharodiya Kishormon)
- Chara Pute Gelen Nantu Pise (Pakhyik Anandamela, 1987)
- Bomar Cheye Bisham (Sharodiya Kishor Bharati)
- Somuddur Dekha (Sharodiya Kishor Bharati, 1988)
- Aloy Adityer Iccha Potro Rohosyo (Anandomela)
- Harano Theke Prapti (Anandamela)

=== Works translated to English ===
- Matchbox (short story collection, translated by Prasenjit Gupta 2016)
- Shake the Bottle (short story collection, translated by Arunava Sinha)

== Television and film adaptions ==
Her novel Baluchori was adapted as a TV serial on Deepto TV named Aparajita. Subarnalata (TV series) on Zee Bangla and Prothom Protisshruti on Colors Bangla were adaptations of her novels by the same name. Devi's 1953 novel Jog Biyog inspired a number of films in various Indian languages. The 1954 Bengali film Agni Pariksha was based on her novel by the same name. The movie was simultaneously made into a 1959 Telugu - Tamil bilingual titled Mangalya Balam in Telugu and Manjal Mahimai in Tamil. Later it was remade in Hindi in 1967 as Chhoti Si Mulaqat. In 1963, Chhaya Surya was released based on her story.

The 1976 film Tapasya, produced by Tarachand Barjatya, was based on one of her stories. In 2010 Gaj Ukiler Hatya Rahasya was released based on the same name novel of Devi. Director Suman Mukhopadhyay adapted her story Chuti Nakoch into the Hindi feature film Nazarband, which premiered at the New York Indian Film Festival in 2021.

== Sources ==
- Ghosh, Upasana (2004). Ashapurna Debi (A biography). Kolkata: Paschimbanga Bangla Akademi. ISBN 978-81-7751-208-3.
