= Anjum Rajabali =

Indian screenwriter

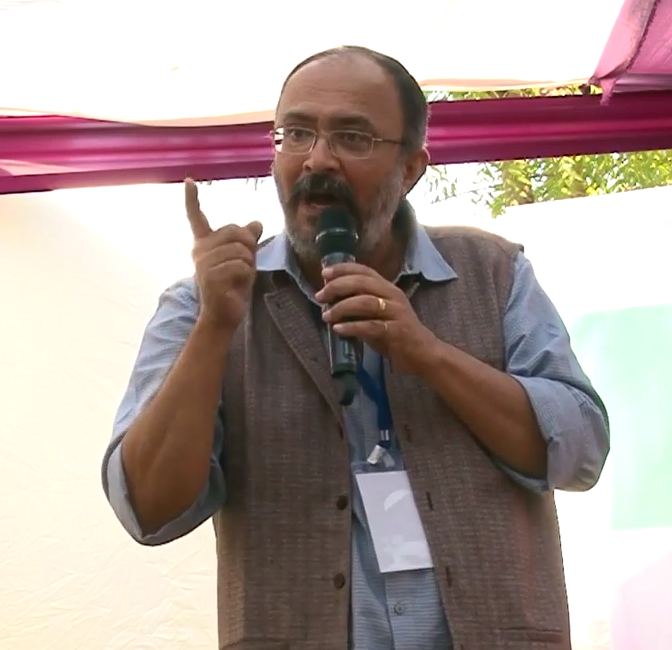
- Rajabali at Gujarat Literature Festival in Ahmedabad, December 2016.
- Born: 7 August 1958 (age 68); Talaja, Gujarat, India
- Education: Rashtriya Military School Belgaum University of Pune
- Occupations: Screenwriter, actor
- Years active: 1994–present

Anjum Rajabali is a veteran Indian screenwriter and teacher. He has written films like Drohkaal (1994), Ghulam (1998), The Legend of Bhagat Singh (2002) and Raajneeti (2010). He is also known for his leadership and lobbying for the rights of Indian screenwriters, as a senior activist of the Screenwriters Association, India.

== Career ==
He did his schooling from Rashtriya Military School Belgaum and began his career in the film industry as an associate scriptwriter for the critically acclaimed Drohkaal (1994). In 1998, Anjum wrote the screenplay for the film China Gate along with writing the story and screenplay for the hit crime-thriller Ghulam, starring Aamir Khan and Rani Mukherji. In the following years, Anjum is credited with writing for films across a variety of genres, including the action film Kachche Dhaage (1999), the drama Pukar (2000), the biographical film The Legend of Bhagat Singh (2002) and the horror Naina (2005). He was the script consultant on Prakash Jha's crime-drama Apaharan (2005) and Anjum's association with him extended for the next four successive films that Prakash Jha directed, with Anjum writing for Raajneeti (2010), Aarakshan (2011), Chakravyuh and his latest release Satyagraha (2013).

He is the Head of Screenwriting at Whistling Woods as well as the Honorary Head of Screenplay Writing at the Film and Television Institute of India (FTII), a course that he founded in 2004. Apart from being a script consultant on several films, he also conducts workshops, seminars and conferences on screenwriting. In mid-2014, he joined with Mumbai Mantra as Convenor for their new initiative, the Mumbai Mantra CineRise Screenwriting Programme - 100 Storytellers A Year - a process of nurturing screenwriting talent, planned with 8 defined stages of creative intervention, which invited applications from Indian screenwriters from any part of the world, including non-resident Indians and even those with mixed Indian parentage.

== Filmography ==
=== Writer ===
Year	Film	Notes
2021	Toofan	Story / Screenplay writer
2013	Satyagraha	Screenplay writer
2012	Chakravyuh	Screenplay writer
2011	Aarakshan	Screenplay writer
2010	Raajneeti	Screenplay writer
2005	Apaharan	Script consultant
2002	The Legend of Bhagat Singh	English Dialogue / Screenplay writer
2000	Pukar	Dialogue / Screenplay writer
1999	Kachche Dhaage	Screenplay / Story writer
1998	Ghulam	
1998	China Gate	Screenplay writer
1994	Drohkaal	Associate script writer

=== Script Consultant ===
Year	Film	Notes
2022	Anek	Script Advisor
2020	Thappad	Script Advisor
2019	Article 15	Script Advisor
2018	Mulk	Script Advisor
2005	Apharan	Script Advisor
2003	Gangaajal	Script Advisor

=== Actor ===
Year	Film	Role
2018	Veere Di Wedding	Kishan Puri
2014	Time Machine	Chetan Kanodia (Older)
2011	Turning 30	David- Publisher
2008	Ghajini	Dr. Debkumar Mitra
1996	Kama Sutra: A Tale of Love	Madho singh

=== Producer ===
- Private Detective: Two Plus Two Plus One (2010) (executive producer)

=== Thanks ===
- Int. Cafe Night (2014) (Special thanks)
- Hrid Majharey (2014) (Special thanks)
- Rab Da Vaasta... (2013) (Thanks)
- Dum Maaro Dum (2011) (Acknowledgment)
- Turning 30 (2011) (Acknowledgment)
- Der Andher (2011) (Very special thanks)
- Read My Silence (2011) (Special thanks)
- Via Kargil (2011) (Special thanks)
- Khakee (2004) (Acknowledgment - as Mr. Anjum Rajabali)
- Sarfarosh (1999) (Grateful thanks - as Shri. Anjum Rajaballi)
- Godmother (1999) (Acknowledgment)

=== Miscellaneous crew ===
- Valmiki Ki Bandook (2010) (Script supervisor)
- Mulk (2018) (Script supervisor)
