= Hip Hip Hurray (1984 film) =

- Directed by: Prakash Jha
- Screenplay by: Gulzar
- Produced by: Manmohan Shetty; Pradeep Uppoor, Neo Films
- Starring: Raj Kiran; Deepti Naval; Shafi Inamdar
- Cinematography: Rajen Kothari
- Edited by: Prakash Jha
- Music by: Vanraj Bhatia
- Production company: Prakash Jha Productions
- Release date: 1 January 1984 (India)
- Country: India
- Language: Hindi
- Budget: ₹12 lakh

Hip Hip Hurray is a 1984 Hindi sports drama film directed by Prakash Jha with screenplay by Gulzar. It had Raj Kiran and Deepti Naval as leads and debutant Nikhil Bhagat. The film was the directorial debut of Prakash Jha.

== Plot ==
A computer engineer named Sandeep Chowdhary (Raj Kiran) is waiting to start his first job, so he takes up a temporary job as a sports instructor in a school in Ranchi, where he encounters an apathetic school principal (Ram Gopal Bajaj) and develops a relationship with a history teacher named Anuradha Roy (Deepti Naval). Eventually, he leads the football team to victory.

== Cast ==
- Raj Kiran as Sandeep Chowdhary
- Deepti Naval as Anuradha Roy
- Satish Anand
- Ram Gopal Bajaj as School Principal
- Nikhil Bhagat as Raghu
- Shafi Inamdar

== Soundtrack ==
The film had music by Vanraj Bhatia and lyrics by Gulzar.

- "Ek Subah Ek Mod Par" - K. J. Yesudas
- "Jab Kabhi Mudh Ke Dekhta Hoon" - Bhupinder and Asha Bhosle
- "Hip Hip Hip Hurray Ho" - Udit Narayan, Shailendra Singh, Asha Bhonsle & Chorus
- "Maidan Hai Sari Zindagi" - Shailendra Singh
- "Aap Jaise Logon Mein" - Nandu Bhende, Annette Pintoo

== Critical reception ==
Hip Hip Hurray is featured in Avijit Ghosh's book, 40 Retakes: Bollywood Classics You May Have Missed.

== Production ==
Prakash Jha was trying to raise funds for Damul (which he made next year), but failed to find financiers because of its bold subject matter. He then narrated the outline of Hip Hip Hurray to producer Manmohan Shetty. Shetty liked the idea of a sports film and with a proposed cast that included Anil Kapoor and Shabana Azmi, Jha was ready to make it. But 25 days before the principal photography was to begin, Anil Kapoor backed out and Azmi followed suit. Jha then came up with a different cast of Raj Kiran, Deepti Naval and Nikhil Bhagat. Gulzar has written the screenplay, dialogues as well as lyrics of the film.

Due to the small budget, the entire climax was shot with a single camera and this led to every single shot being filmed three or four times to give the feel of multiple angles. The film was shot in Ranchi at Vikas Vidyalaya and Bishop Westcott School.
