= Richa Sharma (singer) =

Indian singer (born 1974)

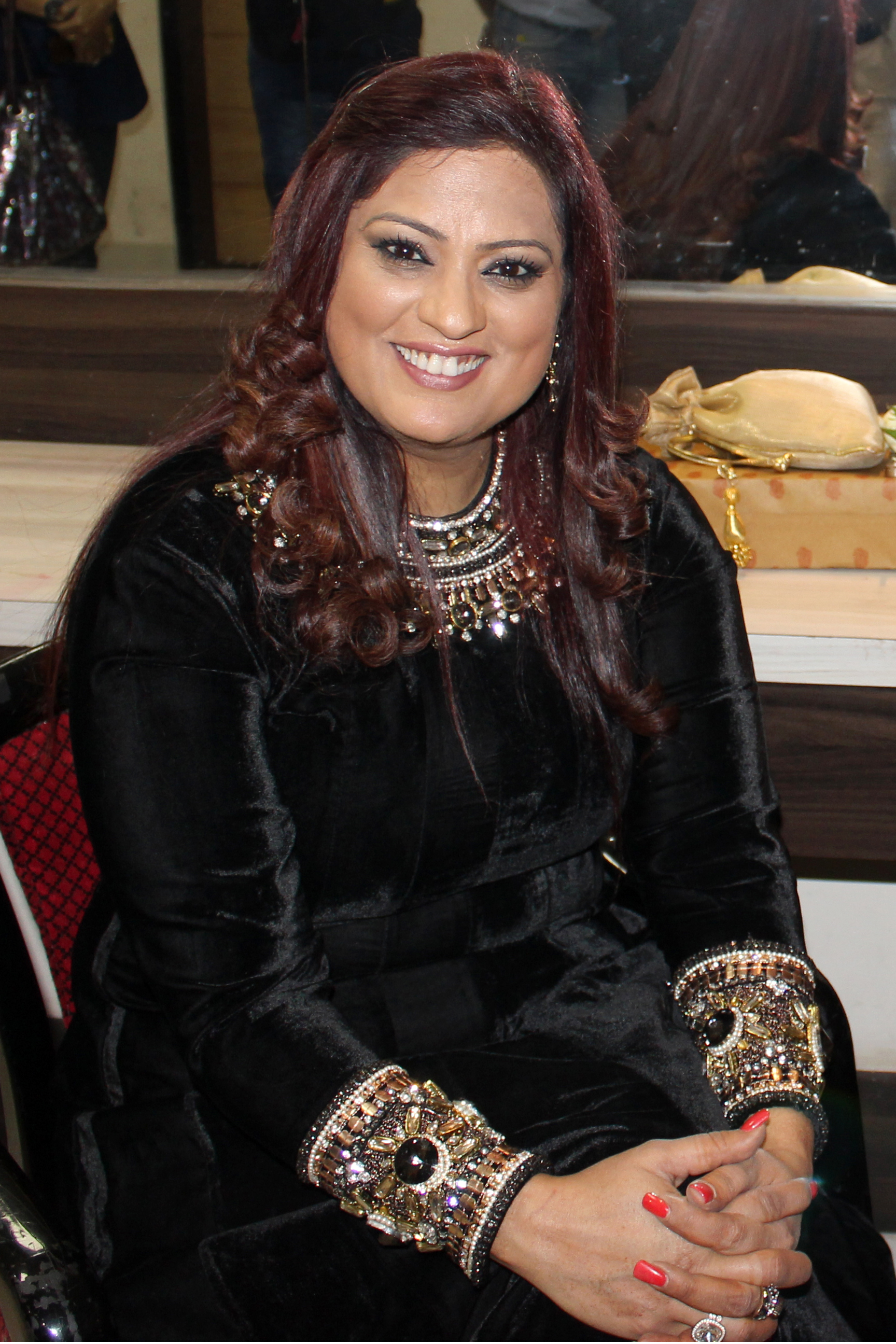
- Sharma in 2016

Background information
- Born: Richa Sharma; 29 August 1974 (age 52)
- Origin: Faridabad, Haryana, India
- Genre: Playback singing
- Occupation: Singer
- Instrument: Vocalist
- Years active: 1990–present

Richa Sharma (born 29 August 1974) is an Indian film playback singer as well as a devotional singer. In 2006, she sang Bollywood's longest track, the bidaai song, in film Baabul.

== Career ==
Under the tutelage of Pandit Aaskaran Sharma, Richa went on to get proper training in Indian classical and light music. Richa added ghazals; film songs, Punjabi and Rajasthani folk songs to her repertoire, thus making her voice reach out to more and more people in a variety of sounds.

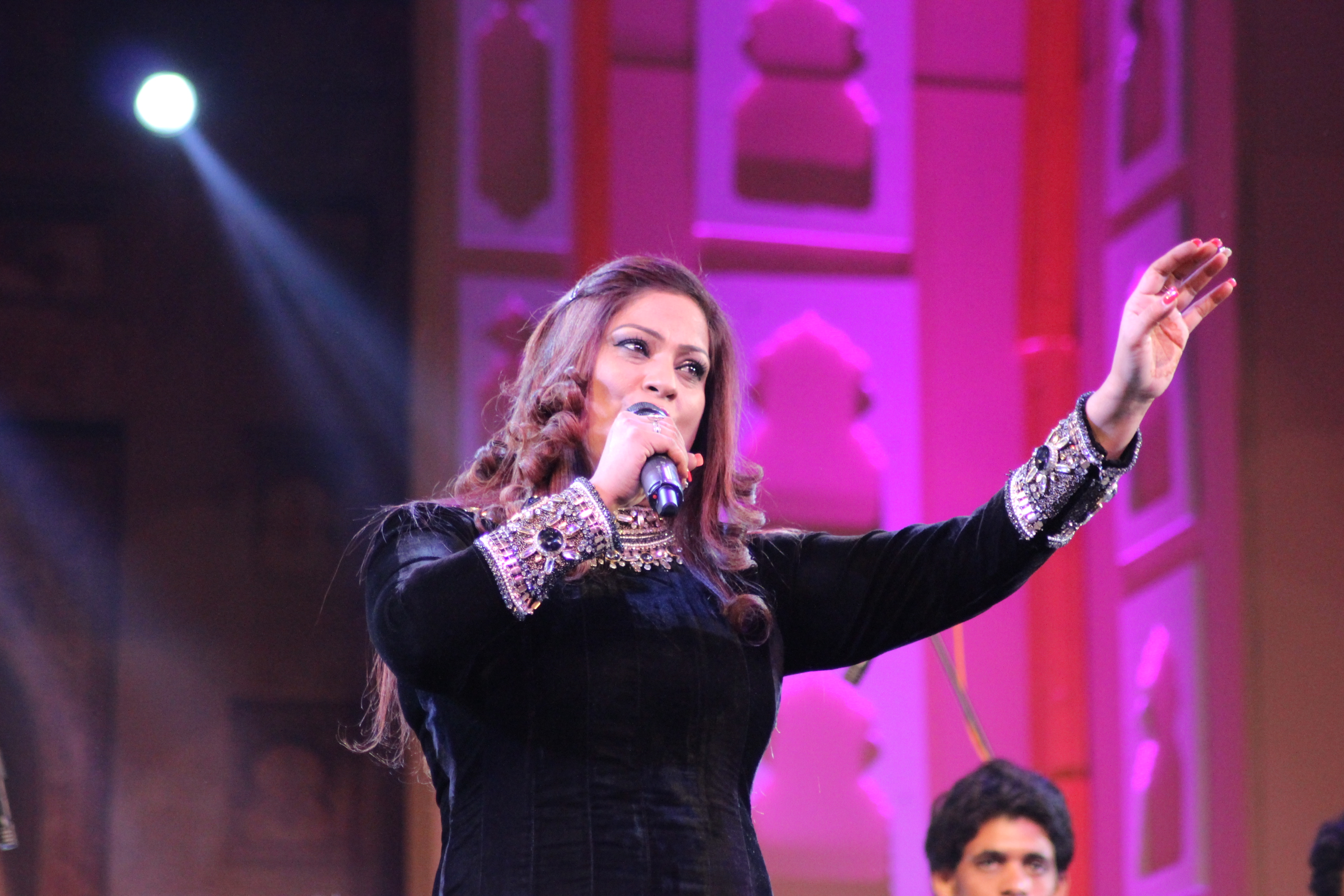
Sharma performing at Lokrang 2016 in Bhopal

While music was at its peak in Richa's life, academic education had to be sacrificed and without any backing with a dream to make it big in the music world, Richa landed in Mumbai in 1994. She sang cover versions and bhajans to ensure she had her bread and butter and simultaneously continued her struggle in Bollywood. She made her debut in Bollywood with Sawan Kumar's Salma Pe Dil Aa Gaya in 1996 and followed it up by a number of films until the big hit came by in the form of Taal where she sang for A.R. Rahman.

Thereafter a spate of hits followed, Zubeidaa, Saathiya (A.R. Rahman); Hera Pheri (Anu Malik); Khakee (Ram Sampath); Tarkieb (the song "Duppatte Ka Palu"), Baghban (title song for Aadesh Shrivastava); Soch (the song "Nikal Chali Be" for Jatin–Lalit); Rudraksh, Kal Ho Naa Ho (Sad version of the title track for Shankar–Ehsaan–Loy); Gangaajal (Sandesh Shandilya); Popcorn Khao! Mast Ho Jao (Vishal–Shekhar), Saawariya (Monty Sharma), and Om Shanti Om (Vishal–Shekhar) and the most popular song for Kaante ("Mahi Ve" for Anand Raaj Anand).

The playback singer has produced many albums, such as Ni Main Yaar Nu Sajda Kardi, Piya and Winds of Rajasthan (for Times Music released early 2004).

In March 2011, Richa Sharma and her family inaugurated the Saibaba Temple in Faridabad, Haryana and launched her first Saibaba devotional album Sai Ki Tasveer released by Saregama India.

She also worked as a playback singer in the 2007 Indian Sindhi film Pyar Kare Dis.

== Awards ==
Year	Nominee / work	Award	Result
2003	"Mahi Ve" (Kaante)	Bollywood Movie Award for Best Female Playback Singer	Won
2010	"Sajda" (My Name is Khan)	Mirchi Music Award for Female Vocalist of The Year	Nominated
2011	"Sajda" (My Name is Khan)	Zee Cine Award for Best Female Playback Singer	Won

== Television ==
- She was the contestant on the NDTV Imagine singing reality show 'Dhoom Macha De'.
- She hosted Antakshari with Anu Kapoor on Zee TV.
- She appeared on the singing reality show Jo Jeeta Wohi Super Star as a guest judge.
- She also appeared on the singing reality show Indian Idol as a guest singer.
- She also appeared on the singing reality show Sa Re Ga Ma Pa Singing Superstar as a guest singer.
- She also appeared on Sai Baba: Maalik Ek Sue Anek 2011 aired on STAR One.
- She sang the title song for the STAR Plus show Sajda Tere Pyaar Mein.
- She sang the title song for the Sahara One show Doli Saja Ke.
- She sang the OST song for the HUM TV (PAKISTAN) Darama Yakeen ka Safar (Oh Mitti kay Parenday).
- On the Grand Finale from India's Got Talent season 4 she sang together with contestants Deepraj, Chanchal Bharti and Toshan.
- In 2014 Richa Sharma has sung a song with Shaan, Palak Muchhal penned by Raghvendra Singh music direction of Navin Manish for Rajshri Production's TV show Mere rang mein rangne waali on Life Ok.
- On 28 January 2017, she appeared on "The Kapil Sharma Show" as guest.
- On 25 February 2017, Richa Sharma appeared on "Indian Idol" as guest.
- On 12 November 2018, Richa Sharma replaced Sona Mohapatra as the judge of Zee TV's Sa Re Ga Ma Pa Hindi 2018.
- She is currently one of the judges on the Zee Bangla singing reality show Sa Re Ga Ma Pa 2022.
- She also appeared on the singing reality show Indian Idol as a guest singer.

== Discography ==
Year	Film	No	Song	Composer(s)	Lyricist(s)	Co-artist(s)
1997	Salma Pe Dil Aa Gaya	1	"Mohabbat Aisi Mehndi Hai"	Aadesh Shrivastava	Saawan Kumar Tak	Vipin Sachdeva
1999	Taal	2	"Ni Main Samajhh Gayi"	A. R. Rahman	Anand Bakshi	Sukhwinder Singh
1999	Taal	2	"Kahin Aag Lagaye"	A. R. Rahman	Anand Bakshi	Asha Bhosle
2000	Hari-Bhari	3	"Hi Daiyya Hamra Naseeb"	Vanraj Bhatia	Maya Govind	
2000	Tarkieb	4	"Dupatte Ka Palloo"	Aadesh Shrivastava	Nida Fazli	
2000	Alaipayuthey	4	"Yaaro Yaarodi"	A.R.Rahman	Vairamuthu	Mahalakshmi Iyer, Vaishali Samant
2000	Hera Pheri	5	"Tun Tunak Tun"	Anu Malik	Sameer Anjaan	K.K.
2000	Hera Pheri	6	"Tun Tunak Tun" (Remix)	Anu Malik	Sameer Anjaan	
2001	Zubeidaa	7	"Chhodo More Baiyyan"	A. R. Rahman	Javed Akhtar	
2001	Farz	8	"Saare Sheher Mein"	Aadesh Shrivastava	Sameer Anjaan	K.K., Sunidhi Chauhan
2001	Rahul	9	"Piya Ki Jogan"	Anu Malik	Anand Bakshi	Sunidhi Chauhan
2001	Lajja	10	"Saajan Ke Ghar Jana Hai"	Anu Malik	Sameer Anjaan	Alka Yagnik, Sonu Nigam
2001	Indian	11	"Yeh Pyar"	Anand Raaj Anand	Anand Bakshi	Sunidhi Chauhan
2001	Deewaanapan	12	"Kamli Kamli"	Aadesh Shrivastava	Sameer Anjaan	Sukhwinder Singh
2002	Ab Ke Baras	13	"Aaya Mahi"	Anu Malik	Sameer Anjaan	Sukhwinder Singh, Sunidhi Chauhan
2002	Soch	14	"Tohe Leke"	Jatin–Lalit	Sameer Anjaan	Sonu Nigam
2002	Saathiya	15	"Chhalka, Chhalka Re"	A. R. Rahman	Gulzar	Mahalakshmi Iyer, Vaishali Samant, Shoma
2002	Kaante	16	"Maahi Ve"	Anand Raaj Anand	Dev Kohli	Zubeen Garg, Sukhwinder Singh
2003	Haasil	17	"Police Case Na Ban Jaye"	Jatin–Lalit	Devmani Pandey	
2003	Hungama	18	"Ishq Jab" (Female Version)	Nadeem–Shravan	Sameer Anjaan	
2003	Kuch Naa Kaho	19	"Kehti Hai Yeh Hawa"	Shankar–Ehsaan–Loy	Javed Akhtar	Shankar Mahadevan
2003	Baghban	20	"O Dharti Tarse"	Aadesh Shrivastava	Sameer Anjaan	
2003	Kal Ho Naa Ho	21	"Kal Ho Naa Ho" (Pathos)	Shankar–Ehsaan–Loy	Javed Akhtar	Sonu Nigam, Alka Yagnik
2003	Aanch	22	"Tapki Jaye"	Sanjeev–Darshan	Mithlesh Sinha	
2004	Khakee	23	"Mere Maula"	Ram Sampath	Sameer Anjaan	Kailash Kher
2004	Woh Tera Naam Tha	24	"Sajan Ghar Challi Re"	Roopkumar Rathod		Alka Yagnik
2004	Rudraksh	25	"Kya Dard Hai"	Shankar–Ehsaan–Loy	Sameer Anjaan	Shankar Mahadevan
2004	Kismat	26	"Dil Teri Deewangi Mein"	Anand Raaj Anand	Dev Kohli	Anand Raaj Anand
2004	Run	27	"Nahi Hona Nahi Hona"	Himesh Reshammiya	Sameer Anjaan	Kunal Ganjawala
2004	Police Force: An Inside Story	28	"Chudiyaan"	Anand–Milind	Sameer Anjaan	
2004	Chot- Aj Isko, Kal Tereko	29	"Gayi Re Bhains"	Raju Singh		Amit Kumar, Sunil Chhaila Bihari, Javed Khan
2004	Chot- Aj Isko, Kal Tereko	30	"Gayi Re Bhains" (Radio Mix)	Raju Singh		Amit Kumar, Sunil Chhaila Bihari, Javed Khan
2004	Popcorn Khao! Mast Ho Jao	31	"Dooriyan"	Vishal–Shekhar	Vishal Dadlani	
2004	Popcorn Khao! Mast Ho Jao	32	"Dooriyan" (Feel The Rhythm Mix)	Vishal–Shekhar	Vishal Dadlani	
2004	Let's Enjoy	33	"Kesariya Balam"	MIDIval Punditz	Ankur Tewari	
2004	Inteqam: The Perfect Game	34	"Tan Se Jo Chunri"	Anand–Milind		
2004	Musafir	35	"Rabba" (Kinky in Ibiza Mix)	Vishal–Shekhar	Kumaar, Dev Kohli	
2004	Musafir	36	"Rabba" (Farewell To Sadness Mix)	Vishal–Shekhar	Kumaar, Dev Kohli	
2004	Musafir	37	"Mahi Ve" (Sleep With Destiny Mix)	Anand Raaj Anand	Dev Kohli	Sukhwinder Singh
2004	Vanity Fair (English Movie)	38	"Gori Re (O Fair One)"	Shankar–Ehsaan–Loy	Javed Akhtar	Shankar Mahadevan
2005	Sheesha	39	"Assi Ishq Da Dard"	Dilip Sen - Sameer Sen	Dev Kohli	Shehzad
2005	Kaal	40	"Tauba Tauba"	Salim–Sulaiman	Shabbir Ahmed	Sonu Nigam, Kunal Ganjawala, Sunidhi Chauhan
2005	Nishaan: The Target	41				
2005	Mangal Pandey: The Rising	42	"Rasiya"	A. R. Rahman	Javed Akhtar	Bonnie Chakraborty
2005	Vishwas: The Power of Faith	43	"Nikla Hai Chand Julfon Se"	Bappi Lahiri		Udit Narayan
2006	Manoranjan: The Entertainment	44	"Gore Badan Pe Laal Chunariya"	Nayab Raja	Zaheer Anwar	
2006	Souten: The Other Woman	45	"Souten Souten"	Anand–Milind	Praveen Bhardwaj	Sunidhi Chauhan
2006	Pyare Mohan	46	"Ek Rub Sach Hai"	Anu Malik	Sameer Anjaan	Krishna Beura
2006	Tom, Dick, and Harry	47	"Yeu Kashi Kashi Mi"	Himesh Reshammiya	Sameer Anjaan	Sonu Nigam
2006	Mera Dil Leke Dekho	48	"Dil Le Ja"	Jatin–Lalit	Sameer Anjaan	Sadhana Sargam, Javed Ali, Sapna Mukherjee, Shakti Singh, Rahul Saxena
2006	Umrao Jaan	49	"Agle Janam Mohe Bitiya Na Kijo"	Anu Malik	Javed Akhtar	
2006	Baabul	50	"Baabul Bidaai"	Aadesh Shrivastava	Sameer Anjaan	
2007	Water	51	"Sham Rang Bhar Do"	A. R. Rahman	Raqeeb Alam	Raqeeb Alam, Surjo Bhattacharya
2007	Manorama Six Feet Under	52	"Dhokha"	Raiomond Mirza		
2007	Saawariya	53	"Daras Bina Nahin Chain"	Monty Sharma	Sameer Anjaan	Shail Hada, Parthiv Gohil
2007	Om Shanti Om	54	"Jag Soona Soona Lage"	Vishal–Shekhar	Kumaar	Rahat Fateh Ali Khan
2007	Dhan Dhana Dhan Goal	55	"Billo Rani"	Pritam	Javed Akhtar	Anand Raaj Anand
2007	Dhan Dhana Dhan Goal	56	"Billo Rani" (Remix)	Pritam	Javed Akhtar	Anand Raaj Anand
2007	Aaja Nachle	57	"Show Me Your Jalwa"	Salim–Sulaiman	Jaideep Sahni	Kailash Kher, Salim Merchant
2007	Mohabbataan Sachiyaan (Punjabi Movie)	58	"Keri Keri Shay Teri Ankh Tuon Lukawaan"	Wajahat Attre		
2008	Bhram	59	"Meri Akhiyaan"	Suhash Kulkarni	Kumaar	
2008	Pranali	60	"Sakhiyaan"		Anil Pandey	Shreya Ghoshal, Sunidhi Chauhan, Mahalakshmi Iyer
2008	Jannat	61	"Lambi Judai"	Pritam	Sayeed Quadri	
2008	Chamku	62	"Kithe Jawan"	Monty Sharma	Sameer Anjaan	
2008	Chamku	63	"Bin Daseyaa"	Monty Sharma	Sameer Anjaan	
2008	Zindagi Tere Naam	64	"Kya Khata Ho Gayee"	Sajid–Wajid	Jalees Sherwani	Afzal Sabri
2009	Jugaad	65	"Tabahi Tabahi Tabahi"	Sachin Gupta	Sameer Anjaan	Mika Singh
2009	Suno Na - Ek Nanhi Aawaz	66	"Pal Aaya Suhana"	Sanjoy Chowdhury	Yogesh	Kunal Ganjawala
2009	Dekh Re Dekh	67	"Ladi Re Ladi Nazaria"	Abuzar Rizvi & Nayab Raja	Sanjay Mishra	Vinod Gwaar
2010	My Name Is Khan	68	"Sajda"	Shankar–Ehsaan–Loy	Niranjan Iyengar	Rahat Fateh Ali Khan, Shankar Mahadevan
2010	Sadiyaan	69	"Sona Lagda Ve Mahi Sona Lagda"	Adnan Sami	Sameer Anjaan	
2010	Ek Second... Jo Zindagi Badal De?	70	"Dil Tukade Tukade Ho Gaya"	Arvinder Singh	Dr. Devendra Kafir	Arvinder Singh
2010	Mr. Singh Mrs. Mehta	71	"Fariyaad Hai"	Shujaat Khan	Amitabh Verma	
2010	Hello Darling	72	"Tere Dar Pe Aaya Leke Band Baja"	Pritam	Ashish Pandit	Ritu Pathak, Rana Mazumder
2010	Hello Darling	73	"Tere Dar Pe Aaya Leke Band Baja" (Remix) - (DJ A-Myth)	Pritam	Ashish Pandit	Ritu Pathak, Rana Mazumder
2010	Action Replayy	74	"Zor Ka Jhatka"	Salim–Sulaiman	Irshad Kamil	Daler Mehndi
2010	Action Replayy	75	"Zor Ka Jhatka" (Remix)	Pritam	Irshad Kamil	Master Saleem
2010	Phas Gaye Re Obama	76	"Sara Pyaar Hai Bekaar"	Manish. J. Tipu	Shellee	Kailash Kher, Neha Dhupia
2011	Patiala House	77	"Aval Allah"	Shankar–Ehsaan–Loy	Anvita Dutt	
2011	Thank You	78	"Full Volume"	Pritam	Kumaar	Neeraj Shridhar, Suzanne D'Mello
2011	Thank You	79	"Full Volume" (Remix)	Pritam	Kumaar	Neeraj Shridhar
2011	Singham	80	"Maula Maula"	Ajay–Atul	Swanand Kirkire	Kunal Ganjawala
2011	Singham	81	"Maula Maula" (Remix)	Ajay–Atul	Swanand Kirkire	Kunal Ganjawala
2011	U R My Jaan	82	"Bin Tere We Mahi"	Sanjeev–Darshan	Sameer Anjaan	Master Saleem
2011	Miley Naa Miley Hum	83	"Mahi Mahi"	Sajid–Wajid	Javed Akhtar	Wajid
2011	Mummy Punjabi	84	"I Wanna Rock Like Mummy Ji"	Aadesh Shrivastava	Sameer	Neha Bhasim
2011	Mummy Punjabi	85	"Awaaz Do"	Aadesh Shrivastava	Sameer	Shaan, Akriti Kakkar
2012	Shanghai	86	"Imported Kamariya"	Vishal–Shekhar	Anvita Dutt	Vishal Dadlani, Shekhar Ravjiani
2013	Ghanchakkar	87	"Lazy Lad"	Amit Trivedi	Amitabh Bhattacharya	
2013	Bombay Talkies	88	"Bombay Talkies" (Duet)	Amit Trivedi	Amitabh Bhattacharya	Kailash Kher
2016	Jai Gangaajal	89	"Najar Tori Raja"	Salim–Sulaiman	Manoj Muntashir, Prakash Jha	
2018	Padmaavat	90	"Holi"	Sanjay Leela Bhansali	Traditional	Shail Hada
2018	Padmaavat	91	"Holi" (Tamil)	Sanjay Leela Bhansali	Madhan Karky	Arijit Singh
2018	Padmaavat	92	"Holi Aadaali" (Telugu)	Sanjay Leela Bhansali	Chaitanya Prasad	Arijit Singh
2022	Shamshera	93	"Hunkara"	Mithoon	Piyush Mishra	Sukhwinder Singh, Mithoon
2022	Dhaakad	94	"Babul"	Shankar–Ehsaan–Loy	Traditional	
2024	Maidaan	95	"Mirza"	A. R. Rahman	Manoj Muntashir	Javed Ali
2024	Amar Singh Chamkila	96	"Naram Kalija"	A. R. Rahman	Irshad Kamil	Alka Yagnik, Pooja Tiwari, Yashika Sikka
