= Pataliputra Housing Colony =

Patliputra colony
- Neighbourhood
- Location in Patna, India
- Coordinates: 25°37′46″N 85°6′30″E
- Country: India
- State: Bihar
- UA: Patna
- Established: 1954
- Founder: R S Pande

Government
  - Body: Cooperative Society

Area
  - Total: 0.64 km^{2} (0.25 sq mi)

Population (2011)
  - Total: 3,531
  - Density: 5,500/km^{2} (14,000/sq mi)

Languages
  - Spoken: Hindi, English
- Time zone: UTC+5:30 (IST)
- PIN: 800013
- Planning agency: Bihar Urban Infrastructure Development Corporation
- Civic agency: Patliputra Cooperative Society

Patliputra colony (officially Pataliputra Housing colony) is a housing cooperative society in Patna, the capital city of Bihar. The Society was formed in 1954 and was meant to be a housing society for government officials only, consisting of both residential and business settlements. It is surrounded by the Kurji- Rajapur road on one side and the Bailey Road and Gosain Tola on the other and by New Patliputra colony and Rajeev Nagar on one side. The area is served by Patliputra colony police station under Patna Police. Patliputra Colony is managed by a housing cooperative society, known as Patliputra Cooperative Society and is not a part of Patna Municipal Corporation.

== Overview ==
The Patliputra Industrial Area is spread adjacent to Patliputra colony. The first mall of Patna, P&M Mall, was built in this area. The historical Sadaqat Ashram too shares its boundary with this colony.

== Transportation ==
The nearest railway station to Patliputra colony is Patna Junction, which is situated on Patna- Mughalsarai line, maintained by East Central Railway zone. The transport is mainly road-based. It is connected with the city through BSRTC buses, private cabs, autorickshaws and rickshaws. Most of the residents have their own conveyances.

== Major landmarks ==
- P&M Mall
- IIT Patna's transit campus
- Loyola High School, Patna
- Kurji Holy Family Hospital
- Notre Dame Academy
