= Yashpal Sharma (actor) =

Indian film actor

- Sharma in 2023 on the set of The Rise Of Sudharshan Chakra
- Born: Yashpal Sharma; Hisar, Haryana, India
- Occupation: Actor
- Years active: 1998–present
- Known for: Lagaan; Gangaajal; Taarak Mehta Ka Ooltah Chashmah

Yashpal Sharma is an Indian actor primarily working in Hindi-language films and theatre. He is best known for his role as Randhir Singh in Sudhir Mishra's 2003 Hindi movie Hazaaron Khwaishein Aisi, apart from Lagaan (2001), Gangaajal (2003), Ab Tak Chhappan (2004), Apaharan (2005), Lakshyam (2007), Singh Is Kinng (2008), Aarakshan (2011), Rowdy Rathore (2012), and Ayothi (2023), Kudi Haryane Val Di (2024).

He also played the role as Don Rana in sitcom Taarak Mehta Ka Ooltah Chashmah (2008–present) on Sony SAB. He played Kuwar Singh in Zee TV's Mera Naam Karegi Roshan. Yashpal is also a stage actor and appears in live plays. He formerly starred in Zee's Neeli Chhatri Waale. His Haryanvi film Pagdi: The Honour was awarded at the 62nd National Film Awards.

== Early life and education ==
Sharma was born and brought up in a lower-middle-class family in Hisar in the state of Haryana. Since childhood, he was interested in acting and used to actively organise and participate in Ramlila during Dasara festivals.

He graduated from the National School of Drama, Mandi House, New Delhi in 1994, the lead role of his theatre play franchise (Koi Baat Chale) with writer and director Ramji Bali.

== Career ==
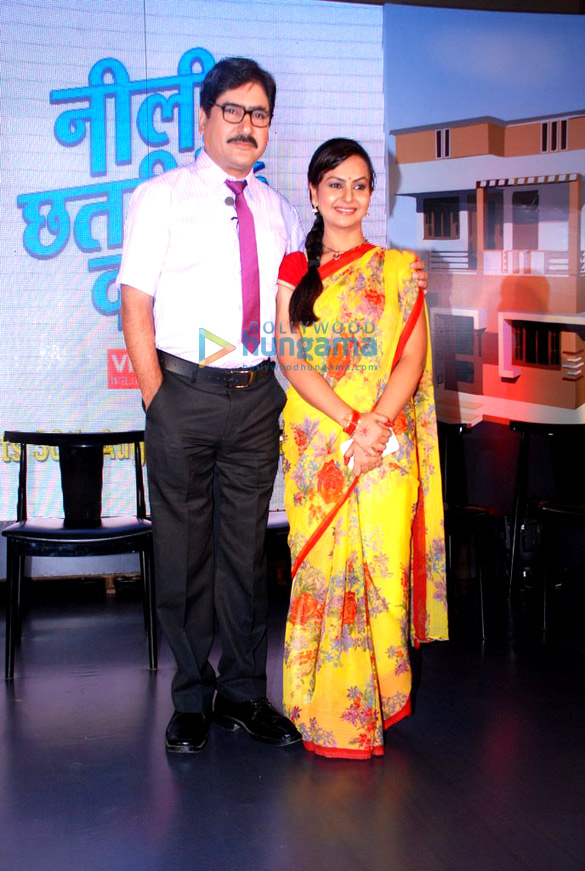
Yashpal Sharma at the launch of TV serial Neeli Chhatri Waale

After his graduation he joined the National School of Drama Repertory Company in Delhi, where he worked for about two years before moving to Mumbai in 1997.

His first big break was Govind Nihlani's film, Hazaar Chaurasi Ki Maa (1998), which gave him a chance to act alongside Jaya Bachchan and Nandita Das. He also started appearing in commercial films, like Shool and Arjun Pandit. However, it was the Academy Award-nominated Lagaan (2001) which brought him to the limelight, and thereafter he appeared in Gangajal (2003) and Ab Tak Chhappan. He has been a regular in films of Shyam Benegal and Prakash Jha and continues to work as a stage actor in Mumbai.

In 2010, he acted in Rage productions' bilingual play, One on One and the play Lakeerein, written by Gulzar and directed by Salim Arif, opposite actor, Lubna Salim.

He made his television debut with Mera Naam Karegi Roshan on Zee TV in 2010. Then he played a cameo role in Taarak Mehta Ka Ooltah Chashmah on SAB TV in 2011. The same year, he appeared in a significant role in Dev Anand's Chargesheet, which turned out to be the veteran actor's last film before his death.

Sharma returned on television in a lead role as Bhagwandas with Neeli Chhatri Waale on Zee TV in 2014. His 2020 film as lead is Das Capital, directed by Rajen Kothari.

He briefly appeared in a short documentary The Facebook Generation, produced by Blue Strike Productions and Dev Samaj Modern School and directed by Sahil Bhardwaj. The film competed in the Reel to Real film making competition at Harmony 2012 organised by The Global Education and Leadership Foundation and was among the top 10 finalists.

He turned to film direction with a biopic on Haryanvi poet Pandit Lakhmi Chand, which he wrote as well.

== Filmography ==
Key
†	Denotes films that have not yet been released

=== Hindi films ===
Year	Film	Role	Notes
1998	Hazaar Chaurasi Ki Maa	Laltu (Brati's comrade)	
1998	Shool	Lalan Singh	
1998	Arjun Pandit	Shiva	
1999	Samar	Ramesh Singh	
2000	Pukar	Major Katar Singh	
2000	Bawandar	Sarju	
2001	Abhay	The Kashmiri terrorist	Bilingual film
2001	Mujhe Kucch Kehna Hai	Batsman/gang leader	
2001	Lagaan: Once Upon a Time in India	Lakha	
2002	Gunaah	Parshuram	
2003	Mumbai Se Aaya Mera Dost	Rudra Pratap Singh	
2003	Chameli	DCP K.P. Singh	
2003	Dhoop	Inspector Ram Singh Malik	
2003	Amma	Raghunath	
2003	Dum	Babu Kasai	
2003	Gangaajal	Sunder Yadav	Nominated, Filmfare Best Villain Award
2003	Hazaaron Khwaishein Aisi	Randhir Singh	
2004	Asambhav	Pandit Parmar	
2004	Ab Tak Chhappan	Sub-Inspector Imtiaz Siiddiqui	
2005	Kisna: The Warrior Poet	Shankar Singh	
2005	D	Shabbir	
2005	Yahaan	Shakil Ahmed	
2005	Amu	Gobind	
2005	Apaharan	Gaya Singh	
2005	Dhadkanein		
2006	Bas Ek Pal	Swamy	
2007	Khanna & Iyer		
2007	Benaam		
2007	Aaja Nachle	Inspector Sahib	
2007	Anwar	S.P. Tiwari	
2007	Risk	Arbaaz Bin Jamal	
2008	Tashan	ACP Kuldeep Singh Hooda	
2008	Deshdrohi	Baba Qadum	
2008	Welcome to Sajjanpur	Ramsingh	
2008	Singh Is Kinng	Pankaj Udaas	
2009	Sankat City	Pachisia	
2009	Well Done Abba!	Ramiyya - Police constable	
2010	Mumbai Cutting		
2010	Lamhaa	Rauf	
2010	Rivaaz	Inspector Sadanand Pathak	
2010	Road, Movie	Waterlord	
2010	Yeh Sunday Kyun Aata Hai		
2011	Yeh Saali Zindagi	Badey	
2011	Aarakshan	Shambhu Kaka	
2011	Sahi Dhandhe Galat Bande	Malik	
2011	Monica	Public Prosecutor Mathur	
2011	Chargesheet	Suraj	
2012	Jal	Ramkhiladi	
2012	Chakradhaar	Yogiraj Chaudhary	
2012	Rowdy Rathore	Inspector Vishal Sharma	
2012	Sooper Se Ooper	Bhairu	
2012	Gangs of Wasseypur	Singer in a band	
2012	Jeena Hai Toh Thok Daal	Mahkoo	
2012	Oass	John	
2013	Singh Saab The Great	Lallan Singh	
2014	Manjunath	Golu Goyal	
2015	Aisa Yeh Jahaan	Nalia Kai	
2015	Hai Golmaal in White House		
2015	Bin Phere Free Me Ttere		
2016	Chinese Bhassad	TT Bhaiyya	Voot Originals
2017	Tubelight	Major Rajbir Tokas	
2017	Game Over	Inspector Pandurang Kadam	
2017	Panchlait	Sarpanch Naginaa Mahto	
2017	Babuji Ek Ticket Bambai		
2017	Journey of Bhangover		
2018	S. P. Chauhan	Jai Singh	
2019	Family of Thakurganj	Sajjan Singh	
2020	Das Capital: Gulamon Ki Rajdhani	Purushottam Ram	Streaming on Cinemapreneur
2021	Bunty Aur Babli 2	Chutwa Chaubey	
2023	The Great Indian Family	Pandit Jagannath Mishra	
2023	The Rise of Sudarshan Chakra	Chandgi Ram	
2024	Bastar: The Naxal Story	Utpal Trivedi	
2024	Chandu Champion	Uttam Singh	
2025	Raid 2	Devinder Gehlot	
2025	Interrogation	Yusuf	ZEE5 Film
2025	Kis Kisko Pyaar Karoon 2	Engineer Baba	(cameo)
2026	Welcome to the Jungle	Jagwa	
2026	Vibe	Rawal	
2026	Maatrubhumi: May War Rest in Peace	TBA	
2026	Jhaad Phoonk	Vishesh	

=== Other language films ===
Year	Film	Role	Language	Notes
2001	Aalavandhan	The Kashmiri terrorist	Tamil	
2001	Avgat	Inspector A. Tadlapurkar	Marathi	
2007	Lakshyam	Section Shankar	Telugu	
2010	Don Seenu	Baiju	Telugu	
2013	Ajoba		Marathi	
2013	Geetiyan		Dogri	
2014	Jatt James Bond	Bant Mistri	Punjabi	
2014	Pagdi The Honour	Police Officer	Haryanvi	
2015	Mukhtiar Chadha	Chidi Hussain	Punjabi	
2016	Sardaar Ji 2	Teja	Punjabi	
2016	Bahniman		Assamese	
2017	Hameer	Hameer	Gujarati	
2017	Toofan Singh	Arvind Ram	Punjabi	
2018	Bharat Ane Nenu	Manohar Rao	Telugu	
2019	Fagun Haway	Zamsed	Bengali	
2021	Dada Lakhmi	Pandit Lakhmi Chand	Haryanvi	Also director 68th National Film Awards in Best Feature Film category in Haryanvi Language
2023	Ayothi	Balram	Tamil	

=== Short films ===
Year	Film	Role	Notes
2016	Sanyog		
2016	Moksha	Asif security guard	WWI Films
2017	Carbon	Yakub	Long Short Films
2017	Mukti	General Amir Abdullah Khan Niazi	SonyLIV
2018	Kaagpanth	Iqbal	
2020	Khayali Pulao	Handball coach	YouTube - Mostly Sane

=== Television ===
Year	Name	Role	Network	Notes
1996	Aahat	Police inspector	Sony Entertainment Television	Season 1 Episode 55 "Jaal"
2001	Ssshhhh...Koi Hai	Jaspal	Star Plus, Star One	Episode: "Vidyut"
2005	CID	Baba	Sony Entertainment Television	Episode 359
2010	Mera Naam Karegi Roshan	Kunwar Kuldeep Singh	Zee TV	
2011	Taarak Mehta Ka Ooltah Chashmah	Don Kuldeep Singh Rana	Sony SAB	
2014–2015	Neeli Chhatri Waale	Bhagwan Das Chaubey	Zee TV	
2020	Your Honor	Pandit	Sony LIV	
2020	PariWar	Mahipal Narayan	Hotstar	
2020	A Simple Murder	Pandit	Sony LIV	
2020	Chitthi	Ravi Asthana	Dhaivat Records & Productions	
2023	Kaalkoot	Sattu Yadav	JioCinema	
2024	Maamla Legal Hai	Adv. Mahendra Phorey	Netflix	
2024	IC 814: The Kandahar Hijack	Sanjay Mehta	Netflix	
2025	Dupahiya	Mithlesh Kushwaha	Amazon Prime Video	
2026	Psycho Saiyaan	Kartik's Lawyer	Amazon MX Player	Special Appearance
2026	Glory	Sarpanch	Netflix	
2026–present	Bareilly Ke Bacchan	Ajab Singh Bacchan	Colors TV	
2026	Waiting Hai	Bhoora Bhaiya	Amazon MX Player	

== Awards and nominations ==
- 2004: Nominated: Filmfare Best Villain Award for Gangaajal
- 2004: Nominated: IIFA Best Performance in a Negative Role for Gangaajal
- 2004: Nominated: Screen Weekly Awards for Gangaajal
- 2004: Nominated: Zee Cine Awards for Gangaajal
- 2022: Won: 68th National Film Awards for Dada Lakhmi in Best Feature Film in Haryanvi
