= Matto Ki Saikil =

- Directed by: M. Gani
- Screenplay by: Pulkit Philip
- Story by: M. Gani
- Produced by: Sudhirbhai Mishra
- Starring: Prakash Jha; Anita Choudhary; Aarohi Sharma; Idhika Roy; Dimpy Mishra; CP Sharma; Ayaan Madaar; Aryan Madaar
- Cinematography: Chandan Kowli
- Edited by: Kamesh Karna
- Music by: Wayne Sharpe
- Production companies: Prakash Jha Productions; Shivdeva Films
- Distributed by: PVR Pictures
- Release date: 16 September 2022
- Country: India
- Language: Hindi

Matto Ki Saikil is an Indian 2022 Hindi language Slice of life film written and directed by M. Gani. The story is based on 'Matto' portrayed by Prakash Jha, who is a daily-wage laborer and his attachment to his bicycle.

The film stars Prakash Jha, Anita Choudhary, Aarohi Sharma, Idhika Roy, Dimpy Mishra, Chandra Prakash Sharma, and Aryan Madar. It was theatrically released in India on 16 September 2022.

== Premise ==
Matto is a daily wage construction laborer, responsible for the livelihood of his family which includes his wife and two young daughters. Every day, he takes a long distance journey from his rural life to the city, riding his heavily worn out bicycle to work. One day, his bicycle is damaged beyond repair in an accident, causing his work and his family to suffer. He manages to buy a new one with great effort. In the end, His bicycle gets stolen and when he goes to the chief for help, he refuses to help Matto and the song, 'Saare Jahan Se Achcha Hindustan Hamara" plays in the background, symbolizing the lie that this song says as India is full of poverty.

== Cast ==
- Prakash Jha
- Anita Choudhary
- Aarohi Sharma
- Idhika Roy
- Dimpy Mishra
- Chandra Prakash Sharma
- Ayaan Madaar
- Aryan Madaar
- Kaleem Zafar
- Gaurav Chaturvedi

== Release and Reception ==
Matto Ki Saikil was released theatrically on 16 September 2022.

The movie received mixed to positive reviews from critics. Critics praised Jha's performance while questioning the pacing and screenplay of the film. Dhaval Roy for The Times of India wrote, "The bicycle symbolises the cyclical poverty that Matto is stuck in. M Gani’s direction is good, but the movie seems to stretch unnecessarily, and not much happens... Prakash Jha and all the other actors get the twang and dialect perfectly but it also becomes tough to follow the dialogue and loses its charm after a point", while rating the movie 3 out of 5. Shubhra Gupta, giving a similar rating for The Indian Express observed, "The film observes its characters going about their business, inviting us to be participants, and we are happy to ride along, like Matto does."

NDTV's Saibal Chatterjee observed with a more positive review that, "On the big screen, we hardly ever get to see those who toil to construct our houses, lay our roads, and produce the goods we buy and the food we eat. In a modest, minimalist manner, Matto Ki Saikil trains the spotlight on the pitiable reality of India's unorganized labour force.", rating the movie 3.5 out of 5.
