= Chetan Pandit =

Indian film and television actor

- Born: Dewas, Madhya Pradesh
- Education: Holkar Science College, National School of Drama

Chetan Pandit is an Indian film and television actor. He played the role of Jayaprakash Narayan in the Prakash Jha-directed film Loknayak in 2004.

== Filmography ==
=== Film ===
Year	Title	Role
2003	Gangaajal	Bholanath Pandey
2004	Kis Kis Ki Kismat	Fatman
2004	Loknayak	Jayaprakash Narayan
2005	Apaharan	Home Minister Dinkar Pandey
2008	A Wednesday!	Chief Minister Sunil Nigvekar
2009	Jail	Jail Warden
2010	Raajneeti	Chandra Pratap
2011	Aarakshan	Professor Dinkar
2012	Agneepath	Master Deenanath Chauhan
2012	Chakravyuh	Inspector Madhav Rao
2013	Zanjeer	Police Commissioner
2018	Satyamev Jayate	Shiv Rathod
2019	Kanchana 3	Abhisekh
2019	Student of the Year 2	Sukesh Randhawa
2020	Laxmii	Abhishek

== Television ==
Year	Serial	Role	Channel
2012–2013	Punar Vivaah – Zindagi Milegi Dobara	Surajpratap Sindhia	Zee TV

- Kahiin to Hoga
- Ardhangini
- Saraswatichandra
- Tujh Sang Preet Lagai Sajna
- Kalash
- Badii Devrani
- Sher-e-Punjab: Maharaja Ranjit Singh as Jai Singh Kanheya
- Barrister babu as barrister subodh chatterzee
- Porus as Vishnugupta Chanakya
- Jeena Isi Ka Naam Hai

=== Web series ===
- Rangbaaz (2019) as Home Minister Ahlawat
