= Aarakshan =

2011 Indian drama film

- Theatrical release poster
- Directed by: Prakash Jha
- Written by: Prakash Jha; Anjum Rajabali; Ravinder Randhawa
- Produced by: Firoz A. Nadiadwala
- Starring: Amitabh Bachchan; Saif Ali Khan; Manoj Bajpayee; Deepika Padukone; Prateik Babbar
- Cinematography: Sachin K. Krishn
- Edited by: Santosh Mandal
- Music by: Songs: Shankar–Ehsaan–Loy; Score: Wayne Sharpe
- Production companies: Base Industries Group; Prakash Jha Productions
- Distributed by: Reliance Entertainment
- Release date: 12 August 2011
- Running time: 164 minutes
- Country: India
- Language: Hindi
- Budget: ₹530 million
- Box office: ₹645 million

Aarakshan (transl. 'Reservation') is a 2011 Indian Hindi-language political drama film directed by Prakash Jha. The film stars Amitabh Bachchan, Saif Ali Khan, Manoj Bajpayee, Deepika Padukone, and Prateik Babbar. It is based on the policy of caste based reservations in Indian government jobs and educational institutions. The film was released on 12 August 2011 and received mixed reviews from critics.

== Plot ==
In 2008, Deepak Kumar ( Saif Ali Khan ), an MSc topper, is at an interview for the teacher's post at an affluent school. The interviewers turn him down when they discover his low-caste roots. Deepak relates the incident to his mentor, Dr. Prabhakar Anand. Dr. Anand, the legendary principal of renowned STM college, where Deepak studied, offers Deepak an interim job as a teacher at STM. Deepak is comforted by his friend, Sushant, an upper-caste boy, and his girlfriend, Poorvi (Deepika Padukone), who is Dr. Anand's daughter.

The state minister, Baburam, wishes to enroll his no-good nephew at STM. Dr. Anand, however, turns him down. The minister decides to install his own man, Dr. Mithilesh Singh, on the STM college board. Cunning and greedy, Mithilesh seeks only to enrich himself. The minister's ambition is to build a multi-billion-dollar educational conglomerate and plans to use Mithilesh's outside business—a coaching class—for it.

The Supreme Court grants reservations for other backward classes. A large crowd of STM students, boisterously celebrating the ruling, arrive at the gates of STM and create a ruckus. Sushant gathers a group of upper-caste boys and tries to drive off the revellers. Dr. Anand hauls Deepak and Sushant but is shocked to find that Deepak has turned on him. Poorvi later confronts Deepak and asks him to apologise to her father, but he refuses, leading to their breakup.

The backward classes welcome reservations because they provide additional education opportunities. The upper classes are against reservations because they do not believe in the effectiveness of the reservation system. These arguments are played out between Sushant and Deepak. The moderate STM administrators are afraid that college-level reservations may create conflicts between the students. When asked by a reporter, Dr. Anand shares his personal opinion – that some form of reservation, free of politics and economics, is good for society. The next day's headlines scream that Dr. Anand favours reservations. The STM board is outraged; Dr. Anand is warned that Mithilesh will use this to oust him. Dr. Anand resigns from STM, and Mithilesh is appointed as the new principal. Sushant soon realizes that Dr. Anand's intention is not bad and that he does not have caste feelings.

Dr. Anand, to his shock, finds that his house is being used for K.K. coaching classes, which is linked to Mithilesh. Earlier, Dr. Anand had signed as a guarantor for the bank loan taken by his friend, allowing his friend's sons to stay in that house for 2 years. However, they used it to earn money by allowing K.K. coaching classes inside the house. Dr. Anand's house lands in a civil court case, and no lawyer is ready to go against Mithilesh. Meanwhile, Deepak, who is in the United States, finds that Dr. Anand has resigned from STM and immediately comes to India. An enraged Deepak goes to that house and takes the law into his own hands by trying to evacuate people related to K.K. coaching classes. Police arrest Deepak, but later Deepak gets released on bail by Sushant.

Dr. Anand resolves to take out Mithilesh with the only weapon left: teaching. He approaches his friend, Shambhu the cowherd, and takes shelter at the tabela (cowshed). He begins teaching small groups of needy and backward students from the bastee (nearby neighbourhood), at the cowshed. His first success is Muniya (Aanchal Munjal), Shambhu's daughter, who comes in first place in the board exam. Muniya's principal offers to send more students to Dr. Anand's Tabela school. Deepak and Sushant return to Dr. Anand and join forces, teaching at the Tabela school. The Tabela students fare much better in exams than their classmates. The Tabela school's reputation grows and begins to draw away students from Mithilesh's coaching class.

Mithilesh responds by obtaining a legal permit to demolish the cowshed. The situation is diffused by the arrival of Shakuntala Tai, the reclusive magnate who started the STM institutions. She calls the chief minister, who promptly averts the destruction of the cowshed. Mithilesh is dismissed, and Dr. Anand is reinstated as the chief trustee of the STM and lifelong principal of the newly created STM Remedial Center.

== Cast ==
- Amitabh Bachchan as Dr. Prabhakar Anand
- Saif Ali Khan as Deepak Kumar
- Manoj Bajpayee as Dr. Mithilesh Kumar Singh
- Deepika Padukone as Poorvi Anand
- Prateik Babbar as Sushant Seth
- Tanvi Azmi as Kavita Anand, Dr. Anand's wife
- Mukesh Tiwari as ACP Shaktinath Thakur
- Yashpal Sharma as Shambhunath Yadav
- Darshan Jariwala as Anirudh Prasad Chaudhary
- Rajeev Verma as Damodar Seth, Sushant's father
- Saurabh Shukla as Education Minister Baburam Tiwari
- Sonal Jha as Shanti Bua
- Amitosh Nagpal as Panditji
- Hema Malini as Shakuntala Thakral (Tai), Central Minister (special appearance)
- Anita Kanwar as Mrs. Kantaprasad
- Chetan Pandit as Professor Dinkar Paswan
- Indira Tiwari as Tabela Topper Student
- Vinay Apte as Bishambar Das (Local MLA)
- Anita Kanwal
- S. M. Zaheer as Kanta Prasad (Dr. Prabhakar's Friend)
- Aanchal Munjal as Muniya S. Yadav
- Rahul Daksh as Surendar
- Sumeet Vyas as Teacher
- Sachin Chaubey
- Amit Singh Thakur as Principal
- Deepraj Rana as Sanjay Tandon (Bank Manager)
- Bikramjeet Kanwarpal

== Production ==
Shooting began on 15 January 2011. Director Prakash Jha finished casting but the male lead was not finalised. Ajay Devgan was first considered for the role, however Ajay had many other projects in hand, including Golmaal 3 and Singham. So Jha decided to cast Saif Ali Khan. Khan found it very hard to juggle between two films at once because he had to learn Sanskrit for his role in the film. Most of the film's shooting took place in Minal Residency, Oriental College, Upper Lake in Bhopal. The shooting finished in early March 2011.

== Reception ==
=== Critical reception ===
Aarakshan mostly garnered mixed to positive reviews. Taran Adarsh of Bollywood Hungama rated it with 4 stars and said – "On the whole, Aarakshan communicates an engaging story with very relatable characters. It's a movie that is truly inspiring and thought-provoking, but at the same time, its running time [almost 2.45 hours] is a deterrent.(...) Aarakshan not only works as a film, but also as a tool to drive home a forceful message. It's a daring, heroic, commanding and an engaging film that shouldn't be missed!". He also praised the performance of the leads. Nikhat Kazmi of The Times of India gave it 3 stars and said – "Sad. Because as a film on the issue of reservation, Aarakshan was rocking till the first half. But as an omnibus on the travails of India's education system, it flounders into no-man's land. Watch it for the intermittent high drama and the gritty performances, scattered as they are." Shivesh Kumar of IndiaWeekly awarded the movie 3 out of 5 stars. Dainik Bhaskar awarded three stars in their review and wrote – "Watch it for the conflicts between the characters and an outstanding performance by Amitabh Bachchan. On the flipside, if you expect drama and finesse that you witnessed in Prakash Jha's last release 'Rajneeti', you will be disappointed." Vandana Krishnan from Behindwoods rated it 1.5/5 and said that the film represents "Great bottle bad wine" further citing "Overall, the film falls short of the expectations the trailer, start cast and story had created." Saibal Chatterjee from NDTV gave it 2.5 out of 5 stars and said: "Given all the pre-release brouhaha over its emotive subject matter (leading to several states banning its public screening), Aarakshan is quite a copout. It ends up being more about the depredations of the nation’s education mafia than the vexed question of job and college quotas for backward caste candidates and its fallout. The basic premise is rooted in the real world all right and the film might touch some raw nerves. But the dramatisation of the conflict over the quota raj that divides India down the middle tends to border on the excessively shrill, if not completely shallow." Central Board of Film Certification (CBFC) chairman Leela Samson said that Aarakshan "unfortunately hit troubled political situations", but was a good film on education.

Sukanya Venkatraghavan of Filmfare gave it 2 stars out of 5, stating "The problem with Aarakshan is its meandering graph. It starts off solidly enough, keeping up a pace that will engross you until interval time except for two totally unnecessary songs. From there on, the film sheds its theme of ideals and becomes a one on one contest that, to put it really tritely, is a tug of war between two coaching classes. The dialogue is strong and opinionated and actors like Saif Ali Khan and Manoj Bajpai do everything to get you to like the film (...)Aarakshan has all the right intentions but it is a tad confusing in its stance. Of course ultimately it shows the triumph of selfless dedication to the cause of education and there is no faulting that. One does walk away with some reservations though." Rajeev Masand of CNN-IBN gave it 2 out of 5 stars, calling it "a deathly boring slog" and adding: "With so much to say, the movie drags on endlessly, with over-written scenes, over-the-top emotions and dialogues that are so heavy, they end up being inaccessible. Of the performances, every actor seems to go through the motions and only Manoj Bajpai inserts some spark onto the screen. 'Aarakshan' is well-intentioned, but you can't shake off the feeling that you're trapped by a three-hour-long tirade. I'm going with a generous two out of five for Prakash Jha's 'Aarakshan'. If you don't want to be lectured, stay at home."

== Box office ==
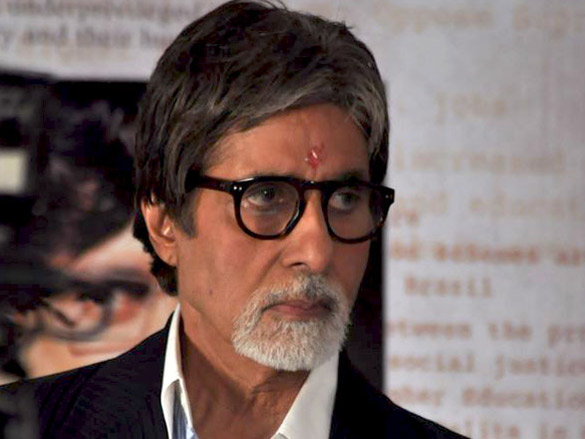
Amitabh Bachchan at the promotion of Aarakshan at Mehboob Studio, Mumbai

=== India ===
Aarakshan released in 1085 cinemas across India. The film saw 50–70% occupancy on its first day of release, while in Delhi, it opened at around 60–70%. The film's business was affected due to the bans imposed on its screening in Punjab, UP and Andhra. It went on to collect Rs 44.7 million on the first day. The opening weekend collections of the film were around Rs 183.3 million. The film grossed Rs 375.3 million net on Indian box office in two weeks. Aarakshan added around Rs 30 million net in its third week to go to Rs 405.0 million net in three weeks. The film added Rs 5.8 millions net in India to go to Rs 423.8 million net in four weeks. The film added Rs 500,000 net in India to go to Rs 424.3 million net in five weeks.

=== Overseas ===
Moreover, the film fared poorly in the overseas markets. It grossed £76,000 in the United Kingdom, $345,000 in North America, $190,000 in UAE and $82,000 in Australia, taking its total overseas gross to $900,000 over its first weekend. In its third weekend, the film collected £13,085 on 42 screens at the UK box office with a total of £168,662 [approx. Rs 12.7 million], Australian $142,193 [approx. Rs 6926,000] in two weeks at the Australian box office. Aarakshan's total worldwide net collections after three weeks were ₹645 million.

== Soundtrack ==
Aarakshan

Soundtrack album by Shankar–Ehsaan–Loy
- Released: 11 July 2011
- Recorded: 2011
- Genre: Feature film soundtrack
- Language: Hindi
- Label: Sony BMG
- Producer: Prakash Jha

Shankar–Ehsaan–Loy chronology
Zindagi Na Milegi Dobara (2011)	Aarakshan (2011)	Don 2: The Chase Continues (2011)

The soundtrack was composed by Shankar–Ehsaan–Loy. The album consists of six tracks. The soundtrack features the vocal talents of Mohit Chauhan, Shreya Ghoshal, Mahalakshmi Iyer, Raman Mahadevan, Shankar Mahadevan and classical singer Channulal Mishra. The concept of the song "Kaun Si Dor" was from Prasoon Joshi, the songwriter of the album who came up with the first lines of the song. The trio then went on to develop the song and roped in Channulal Mishra, who agreed to sing the song as per their request. The soundtrack was released on 11 July 2011.

The film score was composed by Wayne Sharpe.

Track listing
No.	Title	Singer(s)	Length
1.	"Achha Lagta Hai"	Mohit Chauhan, Shreya Ghoshal	3:57
2.	"Mauka"	Mahalakshmi Iyer, Raman Mahadevan, Tarun Sagar, Gaurav Gupta, Rehan Khan	4:51
3.	"Kaun Si Dor"	Channulal Mishra, Shreya Ghoshal	5:45
4.	"Roshanee"	Shankar Mahadevan	4:37
5.	"Saans Albeli"	Channulal Mishra	3:14
6.	"Mauka" (Remix)	Mahalakshmi Iyer, Raman Mahadevan, Tarun Sagar, Gaurav Gupta, Rehan Khan	3:26

=== Reception ===
Upon release, the album received generally mixed reviews from the critics. Joginder Tuteja of Bollywood hungama gave it 2 out of 5 stars and said: "Aarakshan doesn't boast of the kind of score that has in it to make waves commercially since almost all songs mainly have a situational appeal to them. Yes, at least 'Achha Lagta Hai' is good that prevents Aarakshan from becoming totally forgettable. However despite low expectations from the soundtrack here, the end result is far more being satisfactory." "Mauka" was voted the best song in IRDS Film awards 2011 by Institute for Research and Documentation in Social Sciences (IRDS), a Lucknow-based Civil society for depicting the contradictory positions being taken on reservation by its opponents and supporters

== Accolades ==
Award Ceremony	Category	Recipient	Result	Ref.(s)
4th Mirchi Music Awards	Upcoming Music Composer of The Year	Prasoon Joshi - "Saans Albeli"	Nominated	

== Controversy ==
In early May 2011, civic authorities in Bhopal bulldozed the sets of Aarakshan because it was erected on disputed land.

Some pro-Dalit groups in Kanpur protested Saif Ali Khan being cast in the role of a Dalit. They objected to the actor's royal background and saw his role of a so-called Dalit as an insult to the community.

The film was banned in Uttar Pradesh, Punjab and Andhra Pradesh before its theatrical release. The Punjab government banned the film on fears that certain scenes and dialogues in the film may inflame the passion of some communities in Punjab. Mayawati government banned the film in UP for two months on grounds that it could create law and order problem in the state.

National Commission for Scheduled Castes (NCSC) viewed the movie after getting complaints of its objectionable content. "While the overall theme of the film is not objectionable, it is loaded with anti-Dalit and anti-reservation dialogues," said NCSC chairman P.L. Punia. However, the Board, which granted the film a U/A certification, said it would defend Jha's right to free expression. In reply to this, the director decided to remove 'objectionable' scenes from the film in a bid to prevent further backlash. Prakash Jha and producers of Aarakshan moved the Supreme Court to lift the ban on the film in the three states. Supreme Court lifted the ban on Aarakshan in Uttar Pradesh later.

Apart from the aforementioned announced bans, there was an unexpected mid screening ban on the film in the multiplexes of Gurgaon, on the night of its release.
