= Parinati =

- Directed by: Prakash Jha
- Produced by: Prakash Jha
- Starring: Nandita Das; Basant Josalkar; Surekha Sikri; Sudhir Kulkarni
- Release date: 1989
- Running time: 106 min
- Country: India
- Language: Hindi

Parinati (English: The Inevitable) is a 1989 Hindi film directed by Prakash Jha. The film is based on a short story written by Vijaydan Detha

== Awards ==
- Silver Lotus - Best Costume Design - 1986 (National Award)
- Presented as An Outstanding Film at the London Film Festival, 1989.
