= P&M Mall =

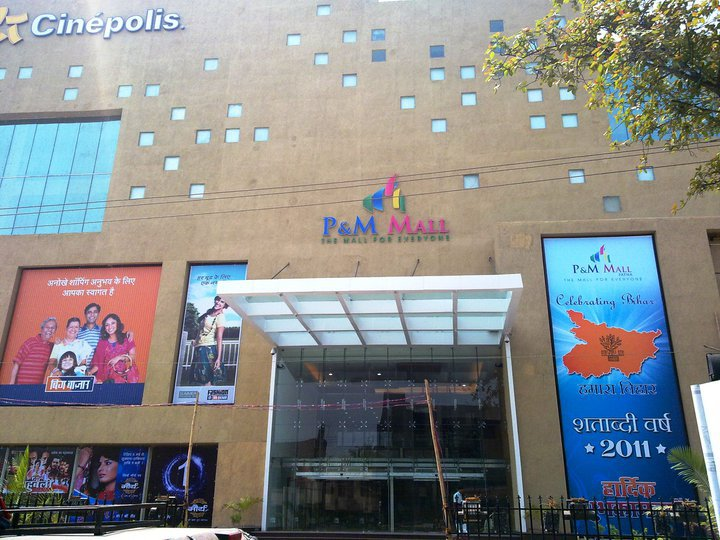
- P&M Mall in Patna
- Location: Patliputra Colony, Patna
- Coordinates: 25.634137°N 85.106248°E
- Developer: Prakash Jha; Manmohan Shetty
- Num. of stores: 92
- Num. of anchor tenants: 3
- Floor area: 250,000 square feet
- Floors: 7
- Parking: 225 Cars
- Website: pandmmall.com

P&M Mall is the first mall of Patna, the capital city of the eastern Indian state Bihar. It was opened in April 2011. Film director Prakash Jha & Manmohan Shetty are promoters of the mall. Manish K Jha is marketing director of Mall. This mall houses world-class retailing spaces which includes hyper market, departmental store, Multiplex, Entertainment Zone, Food court, restaurants, Gym, hotel, Conference & Banquet facilities Banquet Hall-Grand Ball Room can take up to 700 pax, conference Halls – Nalanda, Mitihla, Takshila and Vaishali, retail shops, elevator, and escalator. The mall is located at Patliputra colony in Patna, Bihar. In 2016, it was awarded the "Most Admired Shopping Centre of the Year: East" by IMGES.

== Multiplex ==
This mall houses four screen luxury multiplex. Cinépolis, the world's 4th largest cinema chain and India's first international exhibitor is the multiplex partner.

== See also ==
- List of shopping malls in India
- Patna
- The Mall, Patna
- Maurya Lok
