= Daya Shankar Pandey =

Indian actor

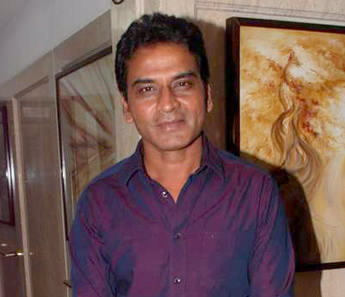
- Pandey at Saahil Chadha's wedding anniversary in 2013
- Born: 19 November 1965 (age 60); Mumbai, Maharashtra, India
- Occupation: Actor
- Years active: 1993–present
- Known for: Inspector Chalu Pandey in Taarak Mehta Ka Ooltah Chashmah

Daya Shankar Pandey (born 19 November 1965) is an Indian film and television actor. He has acted in a number of Hindi movies like Lagaan (2001), Gangaajal (2003), Swades (2004) and Raajneeti (2010). He began his career with the film Pehla Nasha (1993). He currently essays the role of Inspector Chalu Pandey in the famous serial Taarak Mehta Ka Ooltah Chashmah. He is also creative consultant of the show. Daya Shankar Pandey resides in Mumbai's Suburban Area.

== Filmography ==
Year	Film	Role	Notes
1993	Pehla Nasha		
1995	The Gambler	Rapist	
1995	Baazi		
1996	Dastak		
1998	Ghulam		
2001	Lagaan	Goli	
2002	Aankhen	Taxi driver	
2002	Makdee	School Teacher	
2003	Mumbai Se Aaya Mera Dost	Hari	
2003	Gangaajal	Sub-Inspector Mangni Ram	
2003	Maqbool	Masterji	
2004	Swades	Mela Ram	
2004	American Daylight	Ashok	
2004	Agnipankh		
2005	Chakachak		
2005	Laila	Dr. Thakkar	
2005	Kaal	D.S. Pandey	
2005	Ramji Londonwaley		
2005	Ek Khiladi Ek Haseena	Inspector D'Souza	
2005	Apaharan	Daya Shankar	
2005	Ek Ajnabee	Kripa "Krispi" Shankar	
2006	Rockin' Meera	Bus Conductor	
2007	Dharm		
2007	Shootout at Lokhandwala	Ostiya	
2008	My Name Is Anthony Gonsalves	Riyaz	
2008	Woodstock Villa	Dayashankar Pandey	
2008	Welcome to Sajjanpur	Chidamiram Naga Sapera	
2008	EMI	Gaffur Bhai	
2009	Delhi-6	Kumar	
2009	Luck	Passport Agent	
2009	What's Your Raashee?	Chand	
2010	Pankh		
2010	Musaa: The Most Wanted	Sawant	
2010	Raajneeti	Ram Charittar	
2010	Life Express	Shukla	
2012	Delhi Eye		
2012	Chakravyuh		
2013	Zanjeer	Inspector Prem	
2013	Mutthi Bhar Sapne		
2014	Dishkiyaoon	Sawant	
2014	The Xposé	Naidu	
2014	Money Back Guarantee		
2016	Anna	Ramya	
2017	Satya	Tabrez Ansari	Bhojpuri Film
2017	Haseena Parkar		
2018	Reva	Gandu Fakir	Gujarati film
2018	Jaane Kyun De Yaaron	Akash Dubey	
2018	Kadke Kamal Ke		Nepali Film
2021	Haseen Dillruba	Brijraj Saxena	
2021	Satyameva Jayate 2	Parag Tripaathi	
2024	Main Atal Hoon	Deendayal Upadhyaya	

=== Television ===
Year	Program	Role	Notes
1994	Tehkikaat		
1997	Ghar Jamai	Hotel Union Leader(Ep 43); Robert (Episode 45)	Guest role
1998	Woh	Chandu Shiva's friend	
1998	Saaya	Asst editor, Mr Pandey	
1998	Family No.1	Pandey	Guest role
1998	Hum Sab Ek Hain	Various characters	
1999	Yeh Duniya Hai Rangeen	Security Guard Yadav	
1998-99	CID - The case of injured witness	kidnapper Episode 87&88	
2002	Shubh Mangal Savadhan	Various characters	
2005	Kituu Sabb Jaantii Hai	Jogi	
2006	F.I.R.	Tv reporter	
2008	Mahima Shani Dev Ki	Shanidev	
2010	Taarak Mehta Ka Ooltah Chashmah	Himself	Also Creative Consultant
2010–present	Taarak Mehta Ka Ooltah Chashmah	Inspector Chalu Pandey	Also Creative Consultant
2013	Ek Veer Ki Ardaas...Veera	Surjeet Singh	
2014	Devon Ke Dev...Mahadev	Lakulish	
2014	Neeli chatri wale	Don Babu	
2015	Badii Devrani	Bilasi Poddar	
2015	Suryaputra Karn	Shani	
2017	Shankar Jaikishan 3 in 1	Bhokal Baba	
2017	Bhamashah	Bhamashah	
2022	Sab Satrangi	ShyamLal Maurya	
2022	Wagle Ki Duniya – Nayi Peedhi Naye Kissey	ShyamLal	
2023	Tulsidham Ke Laddu Gopal	Shyamsundar Das	

=== Web series ===
Year	Title	Role
2018	Rangbaaz	Mahavir
2020	Raktanchal	Saheb Singh
2022	Putham Pudhu Kaalai Vidiyaadhaa	Arjun's father
2022	Faadu a love story	Abhay's father
2024	Zindaginama	Namrata's Father
2026	Waiting Hai	ASI Lokesh Kumar

== Awards and nominations ==
Year	Award	Category	Nominated Work	Result
2012	Producers Guild Film Awards	Best Actor in a Drama Series	Mahima Shanidev Ki	Nominated
2015	Indian Telly Awards	Best Actor in a Negative Role	Badii Devrani	Nominated
2018	Indian Television Academy Awards	Best Actor in a Supporting Role	Taarak Mehta Ka Ooltah Chashmah	Nominated
