= Kudiattam =

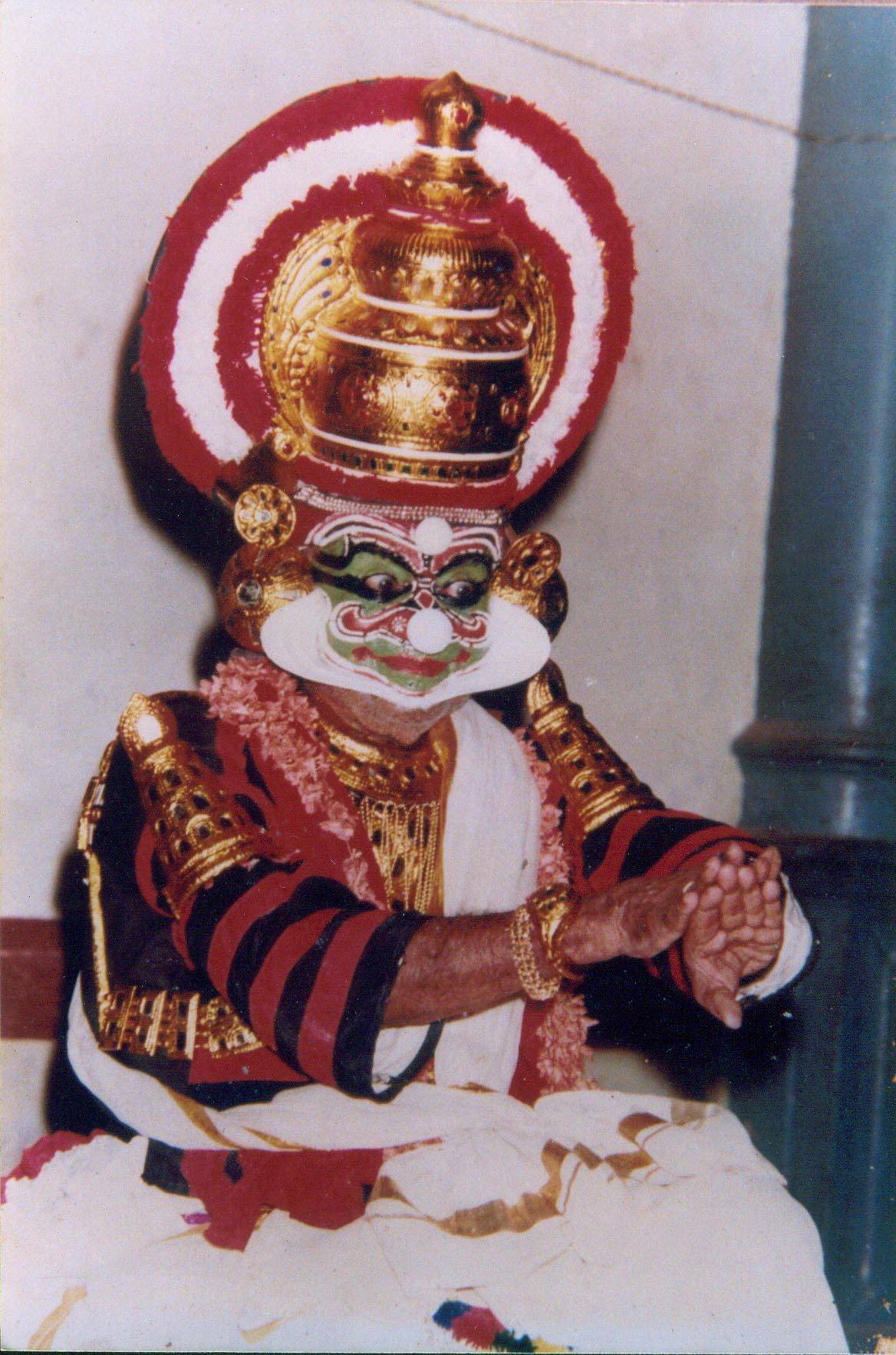
- About a very ancient classical theatre form from Kerala.
- Directed by: Prakash Jha
- Starring: Guru Mani Madhava Chakkiar
- Distributed by: Prakash Jha Productions; Mumbai
- Release date: 1986 (India)
- Country: India
- Language: Hindi

Kudiattam is a 1986 documentary film on 2000-year-old Sanskrit drama tradition of Kerala state of India, Kutiyattam. The film is directed by Prakash Jha. The film features greatest Kutiyattam maestro of modern times Guru Natyacharya Māni Mādhava Chākyār. The film has won Indian government's National Film Award for Best Arts/Cultural Film in 1987.

== See also ==
- Māni Mādhava Chākyār
- Kutiyattam
- Prakash Jha
