= Jai Gangaajal =

2016 Indian film by Prakash Jha

- Theatrical release poster
- Directed by: Prakash Jha
- Written by: Prakash Jha
- Produced by: Prakash Jha; Milind Dabke
- Starring: Priyanka Chopra; Prakash Jha; Manav Kaul
- Cinematography: Sachin K. Krishn
- Edited by: Santosh Mandal
- Music by: Salim–Sulaiman
- Production companies: Prakash Jha Productions; Play Entertainment
- Distributed by: Play Entertainment
- Release date: 4 March 2016
- Running time: 149 minutes
- Country: India
- Language: Hindi
- Budget: ₹330 million
- Box office: ₹495.9 million

Jai Gangaajal (transl. Hail the waters of the Ganges) is a 2016 Indian Hindi-language crime drama film written and directed by Prakash Jha. It is a sequel to the 2003 film Gangaajal, and stars Priyanka Chopra in the lead role, with Jha in a supporting role.

The film was released worldwide on 4 March 2016. The Government of Madhya Pradesh declared Jai Gangaajal tax-free on 9 March 2016.

== Plot ==
Babloo Pandey (Manav Kaul), the MLA of Bankipur district, and his brother Dabloo Pandey (Ninad Kamat) run a jungle raaj in their town of Lakhisarai. They are grabbing land for a power plant whose financiers are backing their party politically. The home minister, Ramakant Chowdhary (Kiran Karmarkar) appoints Abha Mathur, IPS (Priyanka Chopra) as the SP. He expects her to be soft towards the criminals and supportive of him, being her mentor as well as the home minister. However, she goes all out against the criminal brothers. Her subordinates get encouraged by her brave acts against corruption and slowly bring the jungle raaj to an end. Bhola Nath Singh aka B.N. Singh (Prakash Jha) is a corrupt circle Officer (DSP) who has helped the brothers for a long time by using legal loopholes and other corrupt ways to keep them out of harm's way in return for financial favours and political support.

As the brothers feel cornered, Dabloo's goons kidnap an orphaned teenage girl Sunita (Vega Tamotia), and her younger brother Nagesh (Ayush Mahesh Khedekar) who refuse to give away their land. After the kidnapping, Dabloo rapes and kills the girl and hangs her from a tree showing it as a suicide just as her father had committed suicide too under the pressure of selling his land. Singh comes to his senses after seeing this brutal crime and tries to arrest Dabloo Pandey, which starts a riot in the town. This induces Nagesh, the younger brother of the murdered girl to use his belt to throttle Dabloo's neck and kill him, seeing which the villagers gather around some more goons and the corrupt Sarpanch and kill them and hang them on the tree claiming it to be suicides. This also starts a chain reaction where corrupt people are killed in a similar manner elsewhere. Abha is frustrated and is unable to control these illegal killings. She tries her best to control the law and order. Singh is attacked by Babloo and his goons and gets injured. Babloo frantically searches for Nagesh, who has killed Dabloo and is now hidden away by Singh. Babloo's goons locate Nagesh and take him in a gunny bag to Babloo, who wants to eliminate him by hanging. But in a final showdown, Babloo Pandey gets arrested and the reign of corruption, terror, and anarchy comes to an end.

== Cast ==
- Priyanka Chopra as SP Abha Mathur IPS
- Prakash Jha as DSP Bhola Nath Singh
- Kiran Karmarkar as Ramakant Chowdhary, Home Minister
- Manav Kaul as MLA Babloo Pandey, the main antagonist
- Ninad Kamat as Dabloo (Long for W) Pandey, Babloo's brother
- Murali Sharma as Munna Mardani
- Rahul Bhat as Pawan Raghav
- Vega Tamotia as Sunita
- Ayush Mahesh Khedekar as Nagesh, Sunita's brother
- Jagat Singh Solanki as Amreek Tiwari
- Indraneel Bhattacharya as IG Mithilesh Kumar IPS
- Pranay Narayan as Ratnakar

== Production ==
Filming took place in Bhopal. Priyanka Chopra began shooting for the film in June 2015.

== Soundtrack ==
Jai Gangaajal

Soundtrack album by Salim–Sulaiman
- Released: 24 February 2016
- Genre: Feature film soundtrack
- Length: 40:05
- Language: Hindi
- Label: Zee Music Company

Salim–Sulaiman chronology
Wedding Pullav (2015)	Jai Gangaajal (2016)	Janaan (2016)

Salim–Sulaiman composed the film's soundtrack, with the lyrics written by Manoj Muntashir. Prakash Jha wrote additional lyrics for the song "Najar Tori Raja".

Track listing
No.	Title	Singer(s)	Length
1.	"Maya Thagni"	Pravesh Mallick	3:38
2.	"Tetua"	Sukhwinder Singh	3:42
3.	"Joganiya"	Udit Narayan	3:12
4.	"Dheere Dheere"	Pravesh Mallick	3:23
5.	"Ghanghor Ghana Ghan"	Keerthi Sagathia	3:16
6.	"Najar Tori Raja"	Richa Sharma	4:29
7.	"Binu Baadar"	Divya Kumar	3:45
8.	"Sanke Hai San San"	Bappi Lahiri	3:29
9.	"Maai"	Sugandha Date	4:38
10.	"Sab Dhan Maati (Radio Mix)"	Arijit Singh	3:47
11.	"Sab Dhan Maati"	Amruta Fadnavis	3:46
Total length:			40:05

== Reception ==
Jai Gangaajal received mixed reviews from the critics. Bollywood Hungama gave 3 stars out of 5, mentioning the screenplay engaging, cinematography decent, editing praiseworthy, dialogues excellent. As for the performances, Priyanka Chopra delivers a superlative performance, be it her perfect and impeccable timing or her intimidating screen persona and presence but Prakash Jha pushes himself a bit too hard to get the nuances and the finer points of his character. Rajeev Masand gave the film 2.5 stars out of 5, mentioning it as a predictable police drama filled with the usual stereotypes but added that Priyanka Chopra and Prakash Jha's performances engaging. Srijana Mitra Das from The Times of India gave the film 3.5 stars. She praised the dialogues, editing and story, writing, "It weaves together crucial contemporary threads – land mafias, corrupt netas, broker-cops, broken farmers-with Jha's enduring concern about vigilante justice." She applauded Priyanka Chopra's performance, writing, "Priyanka Chopra shines as 'Madam Sir' Abha Mathur, whose lightning slaps and lathi charges have you applauding. This is a polished, restrained Priyanka, who barely smiles but conveys the ethics and empathy of the law." She commended Rahul Bhat's cameo and the dynamics between BN and Dablu but was disappointed with Manav Kaul's performance in particular. Rohit Vats of Hindustan Times gave 2.5 stars, writing, "Jai Gangaajal is just another attempt at making a blockbuster, but it lacks the depth of Gangaajal and Apharan. Still, there's enough for the audience to keep whistling and clapping." According to him, Prakash Jha is restrained in dialogue delivery and really effective in emotional scenes. He wrote that the storyline doesn't offer anything that haven't seen before but it has tear-inducing moments with explosive dialogues. Writing for NDTV, Saibal Chatterjee gave 2.5 stars, saying, "Despite the topical themes it tackles and all the supercharged action that unfolds on the screen, Jai Gangaajal never really kicks into top gear." Shubhra Gupta from The Indian Express gave only 1.5 stars, writing "Priyanka Chopra's too-sophisticated unmade-up-make-up is very distracting, even in her few convincing moments. And the film goes on for far too long, even when we know how of it all will end." However, she was all praise for Prakash Jha's full-fledged role.

== Awards and nominations ==
Award	Category	Recipients and nominees	Result	Ref.
9th Mirchi Music Awards	Raag-Inspired Song of the Year	"Sab Dhan Maati (Male)"	Nominated	
