= Chhannulal Mishra =

Hindustani classical singer (1936–2025)

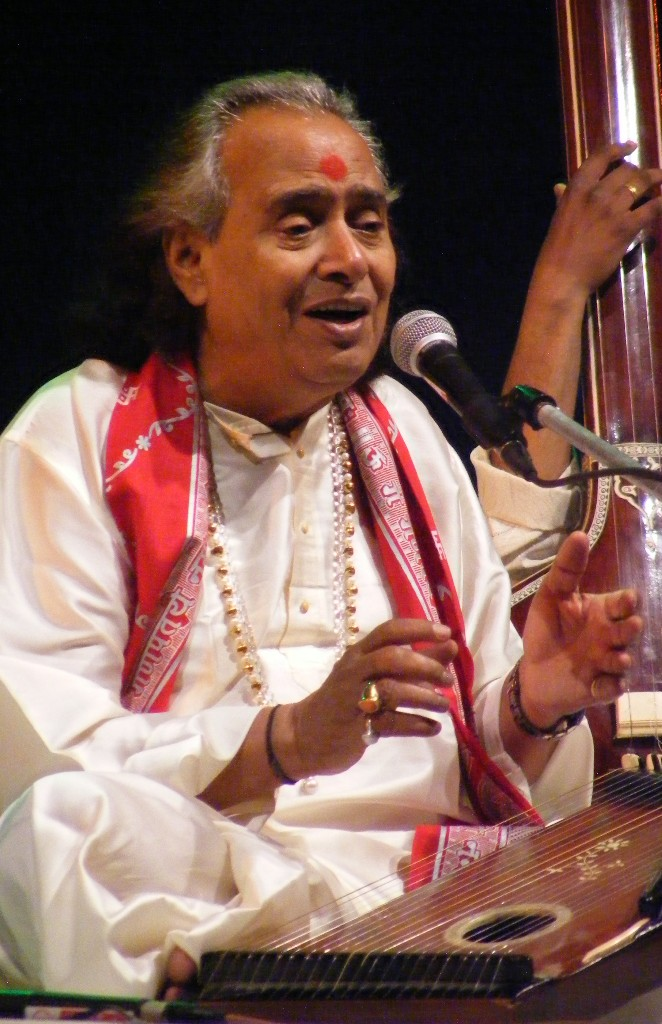
- Mishra performing in 2009

Background information
- Born: 3 August 1936; Hariharpur, Azamgarh district, United Provinces of Agra and Oudh, British India
- Died: 2 October 2025 (aged 89) Mirzapur, Uttar Pradesh, India
- Genres: Hindustani classical music, Thumri
- Occupation: Singer
- Years active: 1960–2025

Chhannulal Mishra (3 August 1936 – 2 October 2025) was an Indian Hindustani classical music singer from Banaras. He was an exponent of the Banaras gharana school of Hindustani classical music, especially Khayal and Purab Ang (Thumri). He won the Shiromani Award of Sur Singar Sansad, Bombay; the Uttar Pradesh Sangeet Natak Akademi Award; the Naushad Award of U.P. Govt; the Yash Bharti Award of U.P; Sangeet Natak Academy fellowship by Government of India; and the Bihar Sangeet Shiromani Award. He was awarded the Padma Bhushan, India's third highest civilian honour, on 25 January 2010. He was awarded the Padma Vibhushan India's second highest civilian award in 2020. Mishra was the son-in law of Pt Anokhelal Mishra.

Mishra was born on 3 August 1936 in Hariharpur in the Azamgarh district of Uttar Pradesh, at the home of Badri Prasad Mishra. He first learnt music with his father, Badri Prasad Mishra, and was then educated by Ustad Abdul Ghani Khan of the Kirana gharana. He was trained thereafter by Thakur Jaidev Singh.

== Discography ==
- Ramcharitmanas - Album containing six tracks sung about Shri Ram's life journey / story. Literally means the heart of the character of Shri Ram
- Anjali (Hindi: अंजलि, literally Offering) – Audio CD with 10 tracks which include four Stutis, two Shlokas, two Chalisas, one Stotra and one Vandana dedicated to various aspects of Shakti – Durga, Mahakali, Kali, Saraswati, Vindhyeshwari, Sitala, Ganga, Bhavani.
- Echoes of Banaras Volume 3 – Audio CD with three Thumris, one Sawani and one Chaiti.
- Holi Ke Rang – Tesu Ke Phool (Bhojpuri: होली के रंग – टेसू के फूल, literally The colours of Holi, the flowers of Tesu) – Audio CD with eight songs on Holi, seven describing the Holi of Radha and Krishna and one describing the Holi of Parvati and Shiva .
- Kabir (Hindi: कबीर) – A set of two audio CDs with 12 Bhajans authored by Kabir, a middle-age mystic from Benares.
- Krishna Madhav (Hindi: कृष्ण माधव) – A set of two audio CDs with 12 Bhajans dedicated to Krishna.
- Purvaiya – Chaiti (Bhojpuri: पुरवइया – चैती, literally From the Orient – Songs of Chaitra) – Audio CD with nine songs of the Chaiti genre which are traditionally sung in the Hindu month of Chaitra (March–April) which falls during spring.
- Purvaiya – Kajari (Bhojpuri: पुरवइया – कजरी, literally From the Orient – Songs of Rain) – Audio CD with eight songs of the Kajari genre which are traditionally sung during the rainy season.
- Rama Raga (Hindi: राम राग, literally The Raga of Rama) – Audio CD with a one-hour rendition of the three words Raja (King), Rama and Raga in various Ragas.
- Tulsidas – Ramcharitmanas (Hindi: तुलसीदास – रामचरितमानस) – Audio CD with five excerpts from the Ramcharitmanas of Tulsidas in different Ragas.
- Shiv Vivah (Bhojpuri: शिव विवाह, literally The marriage of Shiva) – Audio CD with the marriage of Parvati and Shiva from the Ramcharitmanas of Tulsidas sung in eleven different Ragas, along with four Bhajans dedicated to Shiva.
- Spirit Of Benares – Audio CD with two Khayals, two Thumris and two Dadaras.
- Krishna – From The Heart Of Benaras – Audio CD with nine songs dedicated to Krishna.
- Sundar Kand (Hindi: सुन्दरकाण्ड) – A set of four audio CDs with the entire Sundar Kand of the Ramcharitmanas of Tulsidas sung in different Ragas, along with two Bhajans dedicated to Hanuman.
- Music from the living room - Pt Channulal Mishra
- Makar Records MAKCD027 The Lyrical Tradition of Khyal 8 - Pandit Channulal Mishra.

=== Bollywood songs ===
- Aarakshan (Hindi: आरक्षण) (2011) – two songs, "Kaun Si Dor" with Shreya Ghoshal and "Saans Albeli"
- "Mohalla Assi" - title track

== Death ==
Pandit Chhannulal Mishra died in Mirzapur at the age of 89 on 2 October 2025 due to prolonged illness.
