= Gangaajal =

2003 Indian film by Prakash Jha

- Theatrical release poster
- Directed by: Prakash Jha
- Written by: Prakash Jha
- Produced by: Prakash Jha; Manmohan Shetty
- Starring: Ajay Devgn; Gracy Singh; Mohan Joshi; Mukesh Tiwari; Yashpal Sharma
- Cinematography: Arvind Kumar
- Edited by: Prakash Jha
- Music by: Songs: Sandesh Shandilya; Score: Wayne Sharpe
- Production companies: Prakash Jha Productions; Entertainment One
- Release date: 29 August 2003
- Running time: 148 minutes
- Country: India
- Language: Hindi
- Budget: ₹4.5 crore (Note: Sources inconsistenly reported the budget of Gangaajal, with Filmfare and The Hindu estimated that it was ₹4.5 crore (US$470,000) and ₹80 million (US$830,000). Meanwhile, Prakash Jha himself stated that the film was made on a cost of ₹10 crore (US$1.0 million).)
- Box office: ₹16.67 crore

Gangaajal: The Holy Weapon (transl. Holy Water of the Ganges) is a 2003 Indian Hindi-language crime drama film written, directed, co-produced and edited by Prakash Jha. It revolves around the Superintendent of Police Amit Kumar (Ajay Devgn) who takes charge of the fictitious district of Tejpur, Bihar, known for its high crime rate and organised crime carried out by dons Sadhu Yadav (Mohan Joshi) and Sunder Yadav (Yashpal Sharma). Due to the local police's slow response to crimes, residents of the district resort to pouring acid in the eyes of the criminals as an instrument for extrajudicial justice.

Following the release of his directorial debut Damul (1984), Jha conceived an idea for his next venture that would be titled Gangaajal, which would be about corruption and political violence. Jha was unfamiliar with the subject matter and had no desire to start production and took twenty years to write the story. The film, announced in January 2001, was photographed by Arvind K; filming took 60 days and took place in Wai and Satara, both in Maharashtra, and sets were designed by Sukhwant Panigrahi. The film's soundtrack was composed by Sandesh Shandilya with lyrics by Akhilesh Sharma and a background score by the American composer Wayne Sharpe.

Gangaajal was released on 29 August 2003. Its production costs were ₹4.5 crore (equivalent to ₹17 crore or US$1.7 million in 2023) or ₹10 crore (equivalent to ₹37 crore or US$3.8 million in 2023); the film became one of the highest-grossing Indian films of the year, and grossed ₹16.67 crore (equivalent to ₹61 crore or US$6.4 million in 2023) worldwide. It received widespread acclaim from critics, some of whom praised the cast's performances—generally that of Devgn—but questioned the plot's originality. Gangaajal received several accolades, including the National Film Award for Best Film on Other Social Issues. A sequel titled Jai Gangaajal was released in 2016 and was a critical and commercial failure.

== Plot ==
The Superintendent of Police (SP) Amit Kumar takes charge of Tejpur, which has a high crime rate. In the district, the police are controlled by the strongman gangster Sadhu Yadav and his son Sunder Yadav. While travelling to the headquarters, Amit's car breaks down and he inspects the area. He observes professional laxity among police officials, crumbling infrastructure, outdated weaponry, lack of stationery and transport, and the dependence of officials on corrupt local contractors.

Inspector Bachcha Yadav, a stooge of Sadhu, visits Sadhu's hideout and sees the infamous local gangster Nunwa. Nunwa has killed an officer in Bachcha's department after a heated argument. Yadav kills Nunwa, fearing arresting him would expose the connection between Nunwa and the Tejpur police, and tells the public he was killed in an encounter. Amit later realises Nunwa was killed because of his relationship with Sadhu and suspends Bachcha from duty as a punishment. Anxious he would be transferred from Tejpur, Bachcha visits Sadhu's home to seek his help but learns Sadhu has abandoned him.

Amit takes notice of the incident and finds Sunder has kidnapped a missing young woman. Amit persuades the woman's mother, who is hesitant to do so, to file a complaint with the police. Sensing an opportunity, Bachcha urges Amit to give him a chance. Bachcha lures Sunder into a factory where Amit and his men are waiting. After a brief scuffle, Sunder is arrested and produced in a local court. The woman's mother refuses to testify against Sunder after the DIG Verma, who is loyal to Sadhu, threatens her into withdrawing her complaint. The judge acquits Sunder because of a lack of evidence.

Sadhu's men try to vandalise the shop of a pan vendor who testified against Sunder before Amit stops them and threw them in jail. At the jail, when Amit goes home, Sunder's two Stooges Munna Thakur and Kesari fight with Bachcha and his colleagues due to their betrayal. Bachcha throws acid into the men's eyes, an act that is locally referred to as gangaajal. The incident leads to controversy and the police are accused of vigilante justice.

Taking macabre inspiration from the incident, local police officials also throw acid in the eyes of criminals in their jails, creating an acute fear throughout Tejpur and falling crime rates. The violent nature of the act finds support with the public, although Anuradha is caught by accident in this and is wounded by acid. Gangaajal becomes an instrument of instant, extrajudicial justice. While all officers deny their involvement in the incident, Bachcha writes his confession in a letter and submits it to Amit.

When Bachcha reaches his home, he finds Sunder has taken his son and wife hostage. After a brief struggle, When Sunder kills Bachcha by shooting him in the eyes. Enraged, Amit issues a search warrant for Sunder and warns Sadhu to tell Sunder to surrender himself. Sadhu applies for bail for Sunder but before Sunder is produced in the court, he is arrested and taken to jail. This time, the court rejects Sunder's bail application and orders the police to keep Sunder in custody.

Sadhu, however, influences the local minister to release his son but Amit refuses and is sent on emergency leave. Sunder is released and disrupts the marriage of the woman he kidnapped and kills her mother. Unable to bear the loss, the woman kills herself. Amit detains Sadhu and Sunder, and takes them to the police station but an furious mob stops Amit and demand their deaths by gangaajal. Amit prevents the mob from killing them, saying anarchy only brings social decadence. He wants Sadhu and Sunder to be tried by the law but they escape.

They hold a family hostage to ward Amit off and a fight takes place between them. Sunder and Sadhu are killed after falling onto a plough, piercing their eyes.

== Cast ==
- Ajay Devgn as SP Amit Kumar
- Gracy Singh as Anuradha, Amit's wife
- Mohan Joshi as Sadhu Yadav
- Yashpal Sharma as Sunder Yadav, Sadhu's son
- Mohan Agashe as DIG Verma
- Akhilendra Mishra as DSP Bhurelal
- Mukesh Tiwari as Inspector Bachcha Yadav
- Ayub Khan as Inspector Shaheed Khan
- Anup Soni as Inspector Neelkanth Tiwari
- Daya Shankar Pandey as SI Mangni Ram
- Kranti Redkar as Apurva, the girl kidnapped by Sunder
- Master Yash Pathak as Ravi, Apurva's younger brother
- Chetan Pandit as ASI Bholanath Pandey
- Vishnu Sharma as Home Minister Dwarka Rai
- Dilnawaz Sheikh in a special appearance in the song "Alhad Mast Jawani Bemisaal".

== Production ==
During the production of his directorial debut Damul, a 1984 political drama, Prakash Jha conceived the idea for his next film, which would be named Gangaajal: The Holy Weapon, which he wanted to be about corruption and political violence. In an interview with Screen, Jha said he decided to make films set in rural cities because he believed they have an "earthy quality" that would attract audiences. For this film, he chose his home state Bihar as the main setting because he is familiar with the local culture, people, and tradition. He did not want to have another topic for his film at the time so he improved the story for the next twenty years, after which the principal photography started. According to Jha, the film's title reflects a metaphor that indicates ritual purification with "astonishing, stark and powerful" elements. Many of his friends suggested other suitable titles, including Police, because they felt the original title was too metaphorical. Jha, however, kept the original title and added an extra 'a' to it. In preparation, Jha interviewed several police officers and read clippings on police he had saved.

Jha announced the film in January 2001 during an interview with Komal Nahta of Rediff.com, and said it would be produced by Jha's banner Prakash Jha Productions in association with Manmohan Shetty of Entertainment One. He called Gangaajal his perception of affairs in the present-day Bihar, saying it is a "dramatic journey" from someone "into the collective consciousness of the society. It eventually becomes an intense meditation on the mechanics of crime and punishment." Although several publications reporting the film was based on the 1980 Bhagalpur blindings, Jha said it is not but that the film has several blinding scenes that are minor parts of the plot. The dialogue was written by Jha.

Ajay Devgn played the role of the Superintendent of Police Amit Kumar that was previously offered to Akshay Kumar, marking Devgn's second collaboration with Jha after Dil Kya Kare (1999). Devgn said he had a positive rapport with Jha and that he was allowed to speak in Hindi without a Bihari accent. Jha said Devgn's acting style led him to approach Devgn again, describing him as a "natural choice". Jha said; "I needed someone who would look sincere and honest in the film, and he suited that. His character goes through many dilemmas, and he's capable of carrying that role well." Gracy Singh also immediately chose to star in the film as Amit's wife Anuradha. Jha, who wanted to cast Singh because he felt the Indian film industry did not see her potential as an actor. Singh stated that it was difficult to play the role as it was new for her. The film features an ensemble cast of 87 actors; according to Jha this is intended to "collectively make up the atmosphere".

Gangaajal was produced on a budget of ₹4.5 crore (equivalent to ₹17 crore or US$1.7 million in 2023) or ₹10 crore (equivalent to ₹37 crore or US$3.8 million in 2023). Principal photography was handled by Arvind K. in 60 days, and Sukhwant Panigrahi served as the production designer. Initially, Jha wanted the film to be made in Bihar but changed his mind for logistic reasons. Filming took place in two areas of Satara and Wai in Maharashtra, and Jha asked local people to briefly appear in several scenes. He said most of them were cooperative and that he felt helped. Filming ended in March 2003 and Jha edited the film. The New York-based composer Wayne Sharpe, who had composed feature-film soundtracks for 15 years, composed the film's background score, marking his debut in Indian film. Sharpe used both Western and Indian instruments for Gangaajal.

== Soundtrack ==
Gangaajal

Soundtrack album by Sandesh Shandilya
- Released: June 2003
- Genre: Feature-film soundtrack
- Length: 20:15
- Label: Venus Records & Tapes
- Producer: Sandesh Shandilya

The soundtrack was composed by Sandesh Shandilya with lyrics written by Akhilesh Sharma. Richa Sharma, Ustad Sultan Khan and Lalit Pandit provided the vocals, and Venus Records & Tapes released the soundtrack album.

Track listing
No.	Title	Singer(s)	Length
1.	"Alhad Mast Jawani Bemisaal"	Richa Sharma	5:39
2.	"Jaankinaath Sahay Kare"	Ustad Sultan Khan	6:50
3.	"Rasiya Man Basiya"	Lalit Pandit	4:08
4.	"Chandi Ke Rupaiya"	Lalit Pandit	3:38
Total length:			20:15

== Release ==
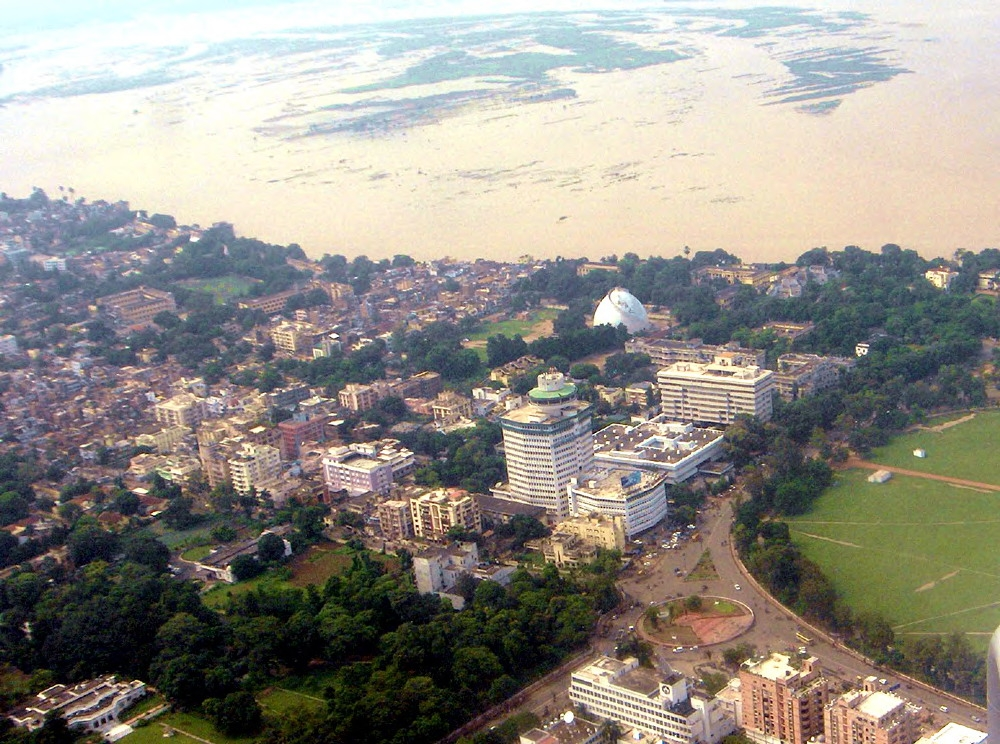
Gangaajal faced rejection from the populace of Bihar, particularly that in Patna (pictured)

Jha had high expectations during the pre-release of Gangaajal, wanting it to be a commercial success and set a new trend in Hindi cinema. The release was scheduled for July 2003 but the film opened in theatres on 29 August that year. In September, during its theatrical run in Bihar, a protest was held by supporters of the political party Rashtriya Janata Dal because the film's antagonist Sadhu Yadav has the same name as Rabri Devi's brother-in-law. They also vandalised the film's posters and filed a petition to the Patna High Court to ban it. The protesters told the film's distributors not to screen the film in the state; they decided to temporarily stop screening it. The controversy ended after Yadav told Jha he did not feel offended about the villainous character who shared his name: "There are thousands of persons with the name of Sadhu. The controversy ... has been created due to a misunderstanding."

Gangaajal performed moderately well at the box office. It was released on 290 screens across India and grossed ₹1.08 crore (equivalent to ₹4.0 crore or US$410,000 in 2023) on its first day. The film collected ₹3.1 crore (equivalent to ₹11 crore or US$1.2 million in 2023) by the end of its opening weekend and ₹5.22 crore (equivalent to ₹19 crore or US$2.0 million in 2023) after its first week. It earned ₹16.33 crore (equivalent to ₹60 crore or US$6.2 million in 2023) in India. Abroad, the film grossed ₹11 lakh (equivalent to ₹40 lakh or US$42,000 in 2023) following the first week of screening and collected ₹34 lakh (equivalent to ₹1.2 crore or US$130,000 in 2023) after finishing its overseas theatrical run. The film-trade website Box Office India estimated Gangaajal had revenues of ₹16.67 crore (equivalent to ₹61 crore or US$6.4 million in 2023) from India and overseas markets combined, making it one of the highest-grossing Indian films of 2003.

On 25 July 2010, Shemaroo Entertainment released the film on Video CD as a double-disc pack in the PAL widescreen format. Since 11 April 2019, the film has been available for streaming on Amazon Prime Video and Netflix.

== Reception ==
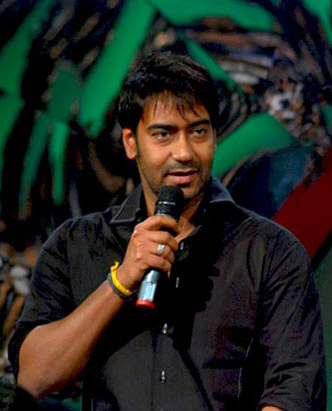
Ajay Devgn got the most critical attention for his performance

Gangaajal received a generally positive reception from critics; most of them appreciated Devgn's performance in the film as a police but questioned the plot's originality. Writing for the entertainment portal Bollywood Hungama, Taran Adarsh gave the film a rating of two stars, saying Devgn performs his role "exceedingly well, carrying the film on his firm shoulders" while noting Singh "suffers due to poor characterisation and ... fails to impress". Adarsh criticised Jha for addressing topics he believed are not suitable for the modern audience, and added the film has an "oft-repeated theme". Deepa Gumaste of Rediff.com stated; "Ajay Devgan pulls up an ace with a part tailormade to reinforce his seething-under-the-surface angry hero image. To his credit ... he brings style and grace to a largely stereotypical, righteous protagonist. To a great extent, his presence covers up the film's patchiness in the second half."

The Indo-Asian News Service said Devgn's "languorous body language and pinched, anguished expression confer a newness to a largely hackneyed role". In a review in Filmfare, Dominic Ferrao praised the "flawless" screenplay and Jha for "[extracting] the best from the cast". According to Ferrao, Devgn "vindicates his talent ... and comes out with flying fists and even higher flying colours as far as emotive abilities are concerned". Screen said Jha had given the film "a unique flavour" with "the upright stance of the hero, who never turns renegade and remains true to the law to the very end", and appreciated him showing the "eye-for-an-eye kind of revenge too is harmful for the society in the long run and the only solution lies in sprucing up the system". Nahta said Jha had successfully entertained the audience although the film's subject may be similar that of an art film, which he believed would not be popular with contemporaneous audiences.

Anupama Chopra of India Today said Devgn's "first-rate" performance is supported by those of Tiwari and the other supporting cast, and that Gangaajal "loses steam" after its second-half, attributing the issue to the exaggerated use of violence scenes and the water setting of the ending. In his three-star review, Jitesh Pillai concluded the supporting cast had delivered solid performances, and described Devgn as the film's "terrific" and "note-perfect" performer. Sify's Lata Khubchandani said Jha tells the story in a convincing manner and that "promises to be very watchable". In another article for the website, Kunal Shah wrote Gangaajal is "rich" in the content and "good" in the technical aspect. He said Devgn's "brilliant" performance would "glue" the audience to their seats but criticised several of the film's sequences for being "predictable", though said it is still "watchable". Mayank Shekhar from Mid-Day noted Jha almost did not use black humour, unlike his previous films of the same genre. Shekhar singled out Devgn, whom he thought "expectedly shines through a by-now-trademarked understated show".

Writing for Outlook magazine, Namrata Joshi, who rated the film three stars, said the detailing of the characters is the best part of the film, writing; "The vignettes of police life, the intricacies of established corruption are well portrayed. It only helps that Jha has talented actors for support." In B4U, Parag Chandrabala Maniar noted Jha's effort to do "a sincere job" in the film, although he made the climax "a little implausible". Dinesh Raheja wrote; "Jha adroitly recreates the appropriate ambience for the policeman who tries to work with integrity in a corrupt system. A pall of gloom and tension looms large over the frames, best illustrated in the scene where a reformed officer ensnares a fugitive. The pre-interval scene of the police brutality—the blinding of the convicts—is gut wrenching but effective." Khalid Mohamed called Devgn's performance "flawless, as incendiary as fire and as cool as ice" but commented Singh was only used as "decoration" in the film. NDTV's Rajen Gurabudu lauded Devgn for perfecting his role.

== Accolades ==
Award	Category	Recipient(s) and nominee(s)	Result	Ref(s)
Filmfare Awards	Best Actor	Ajay Devgn	Nominated	
Filmfare Awards	Best Performance in a Negative Role	Yashpal Sharma	Nominated	
Filmfare Awards	Best Background Score	Wayne Sharpe	Won	
International Indian Film Academy Awards	Best Performance in a Negative Role	Yashpal Sharma	Nominated	
National Film Awards	Best Film on Other Social Issues	Gangaajal	Won (Note: Tied with Koi... Mil Gaya.)	
Producers Guild Film Awards	Best Film	Gangaajal	Nominated	
Producers Guild Film Awards	Best Director	Prakash Jha	Nominated	
Producers Guild Film Awards	Best Actor in a Leading Role	Ajay Devgn	Nominated	
Producers Guild Film Awards	Best Screenplay	Prakash Jha	Nominated	
Producers Guild Film Awards	Best Editing	Prakash Jha	Nominated	
Screen Awards	Best Film	Gangaajal	Nominated	
Screen Awards	Best Director	Prakash Jha	Nominated	
Screen Awards	Best Actor	Ajay Devgn	Nominated	
Screen Awards	Best Supporting Actor	Mukesh Tiwari	Nominated	
Screen Awards	Best Actor in a Negative Role	Yashpal Sharma	Nominated	
Screen Awards	Best Story	Prakash Jha	Nominated	
Screen Awards	Best Dialogue	Prakash Jha	Nominated	
Screen Awards	Best Art Direction	Sukant Panigrahi	Nominated	
Screen Awards	Best Action	Jai Singh	Nominated	
Stardust Awards	Best Director	Prakash Jha	Nominated	
Stardust Awards	Actor of the Year – Male	Ajay Devgn	Nominated (Note: Also for Bhoot.)	
Zee Cine Awards	Best Director	Prakash Jha	Nominated	
Zee Cine Awards	Best Actor – Male	Ajay Devgn	Nominated	
Zee Cine Awards	Best Actor in a Supporting Role – Male	Mukesh Tiwari	Nominated	
Zee Cine Awards	Best Performance in a Negative Role	Yashpal Sharma	Nominated	
Zee Cine Awards	Best Costume Design	Krithi Shetty, Vijay Patil	Nominated	
Zee Cine Awards	Best Story	Prakash Jha	Nominated	
Zee Cine Awards	Best Art Direction	Sukant Panigrahi	Nominated	
Zee Cine Awards	Best Dialogue	Prakash Jha	Nominated	
Zee Cine Awards	Best Action	Jai Singh	Nominated	
Zee Cine Awards	Best Screenplay	Prakash Jha	Nominated	
Zee Cine Awards	Best Background Score	Wayne Sharpe	Nominated	
Zee Cine Awards	Best Re-recording	Anup Dev, Raj Kamal	Nominated	

== Sequel ==
In 2012, the Hindustan Times reported Devgn would star in a sequel to the film that was titled Gangaajal 2. Two years later, more reports were published stating Devgn would be replaced by an actress; he believed he would not be suitable for the sequel. Priyanka Chopra was cast for the lead and the film was retitled Jai Gangaajal. The sequel opened in theatres on 4 March 2016; it received mixed reviews from critics and performed poorly at the box office.
