= Manmohan Shetty =

Indian entrepreneur and film producer

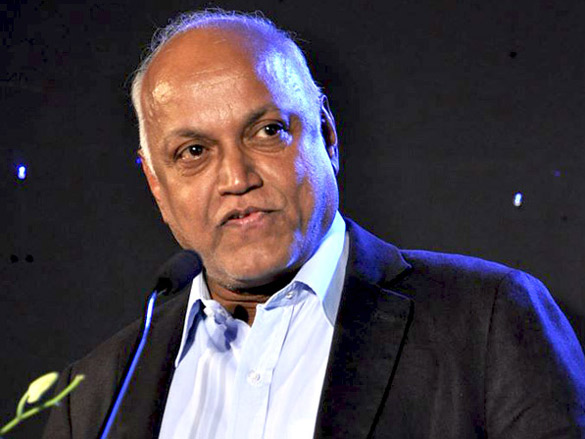
- Manmohan Shetty

Manmohan Shetty is an Indian entrepreneur who founded and developed Adlabs Films Ltd, one of India’s largest media and entertainment firms.

== Biography ==
Shetty was born and schooled in Mangalore in India to a Tulu-speaking Tuluva Bunt community. He studied Arts at Mumbai’s Somaiya College and started his career with Adlabs Films.

== Career ==
=== Adlabs Films Ltd ===
Shetty founded his first company Adlabs Films Ltd. as an advertising films processing company in 1976. Soon, the firm ventured into feature film processing by setting up a laboratory in Film City, Mumbai.

He produced films like Ardh Satya, Chakra, Hip Hip Hurray, Holi and more. In the meantime Adlabs Films Ltd. went on to win the National Award several times for their technical contribution in Indian cinema. It initially started with films for advertising, The first feature film the company processed was Masoom, a Shekhar Kapoor film. Eventually it grew to process almost 90% of the Hindi film industry. It specialized in enhancing 16mm films to 35 mm format. It won several national awards as best film processing laboratory.

The company went public in 2000 and expanded into the film exhibition business. They launched India’s first and largest IMAX dome in 2001 at Wadala, Mumbai, and later before introducing the multiplex culture to India. Adlabs had close to 100 screens and a market capitalization of approximately $1 billion in 2008. The company has been renamed to Reliance Mediaworks Limited in 2009.

=== Walkwater Media Ltd. ===
Shetty established Walkwater Media Ltd in 2007. It is an integrated business encompassing production across films, television, animation, other media as well as intellectual property exploitation. His two daughters, Pooja Shetty-Deora and Aarti Shetty are associated with the company. Pooja is the joint managing director; Aarti is the creative head of its Film Production Division. Both of them produced the 2010 film Tere Bin Laden.

=== Adlabs Imagica ===
Shetty started another entertainment project under the name of Adlabs Imagica. Adlabs Imagica is a theme park built at a cost of 1600Cr INR, on a 300-acre site, between Mumbai and Pune on the Mumbai-Pune Expressway. The park has around 500 employees and can accommodate 20,000 visitors. Shetty is targeting to host over above 3 million visitors in the first year of operations.

=== Entertainment One ===
His production company, Entertainment One, has produced films like Gangaajal, Main Madhuri Dixit Banna Chahti Hoon, Inteha and Munnabhai MBBS.

=== Associations ===
Shetty is ex-chairman of the National Film Development Corporation. He has been associated as a producer with films like Ardh Satya, Chakra, Hip Hip Hurray, Aaghat and Holi.

== Filmography ==
- Chakra (1981)
- Ardh Satya (1983)
- Hip Hip Hurray (1984)
- Aghaat (1985)
- Shrikant (1987)
- Hazaar Chaurasi Ki Maa (1998)
- Main Madhuri Dixit Banna Chahti Hoon (2003)
- Munna Bhai M.B.B.S. (2003)
- Gangaajal (2003)
- Dev (2004)
- Dil Jo Bhi Kahey (2005)
- Bluffmaster! (2005)
- Waqt (2005)
- Apaharan (2005)
- Taxi No.9211 (2006)
- Shiva (2006)
- Darwaza Band Rakho (2006)
- Mitti Waajan Mardi (2007)
- Johnny Gaddar (2007)
- Khoya Khoya Chand (2007)
- Marigold (2007)
- Ram Gopal Varma Ki Aag (2007)
- Nishabd (2007)
- Dil Dosti Etc (2007)
- Namastey London (2007)
- Singh Is Kinng (2008)
