= Chakravyuh (2012 film) =

2012 Indian film by Prakash Jha

Chakravyuh – A War You Cannot Escape
- Theatrical release poster
- Directed by: Prakash Jha
- Written by: Prakash Jha; Anjum Rajabali; Sagar Pandya
- Produced by: Prakash Jha; Sunil Lulla
- Starring: Arjun Rampal; Abhay Deol; Manoj Bajpayee; Esha Gupta; Anjali Patil; Om Puri
- Cinematography: Sachin K. Krishn
- Edited by: Santosh Mandal
- Music by: Salim–Sulaiman; Aadesh Shrivastava; Sandesh Shandilya; Vijay Verma; Shantanu Moitra
- Production company: Prakash Jha Productions
- Distributed by: Eros International
- Release date: 24 October 2012
- Running time: 152 minutes
- Country: India
- Language: Hindi
- Budget: ₹30 crore (US$3.1 million)
- Box office: ₹25.7 crore (US$2.7 million)

Chakrayuvh is a 2012 Indian Hindi-language political action thriller film directed by Prakash Jha. The film stars Arjun Rampal, Abhay Deol, Manoj Bajpayee, Esha Gupta, Anjali Patil, and Om Puri. It is based on the struggles faced by the Naxalite movement in India.

It was released on 24 October 2012, coinciding with Durga Puja. Despite receiving positive reviews from critics, the film underperformed at the box-office.

== Plot ==
Adil Khan, a decorated police officer, is appointed Senior Superintendent of Police (SSP) in the Naxalite-affected district of Nandighat after 84 state police and CRPF personnel are killed in a Maoist attack. Upon his arrival, he discovers that the insurgents, led by Rajan, effectively control the region and repeatedly evade police operations, leaving Adil frustrated despite his authority.

Adil is soon reunited with his friend Kabir, who proposes infiltrating the Maoist organization and acting as Adil’s informer. Although initially hesitant, Adil agrees to the plan. Kabir successfully gains the trust of Rajan’s group and begins secretly passing information to Adil. Using the intelligence provided by Kabir, the police conduct several successful operations, including the seizure of a large cache of weapons, the killing of two senior Maoist leaders and dozens of militants at a training camp, and the capture of Rajan.

During his time with the group, however, Kabir becomes increasingly aware of the hardships faced by the local tribal population, many of whom have been displaced by development projects and feel neglected by the authorities. His growing sympathy for their plight begins to affect his loyalties. At the same time, Juhi, a committed Maoist who has endured personal tragedy, develops a romantic attachment to him.

As Kabir’s ideological conflict deepens, he struggles to reconcile his loyalty to Adil with his empathy for the insurgents and the villagers they claim to represent. Before he can resolve the situation with Adil, circumstances force Kabir into actions that place him in direct opposition to his former ally. The conflict escalates into a personal and political confrontation between the two men, with lasting consequences for the region.

== Cast ==
- Arjun Rampal as SSP Adil Khan IPS
- Abhay Deol as Kabir / Comrade Azad, Adil's friend who infiltrates the Naxal movement as an informer
- Manoj Bajpayee as Rajan, leader of the Naxalities
- Esha Gupta as Reha Menon IPS
- Anjali Patil as Juhi, a Naxalite commander who develops romantic feelings towards Kabir
- Om Puri as Govind Suryavanshi
- Kabir Bedi as Prashanth Mahanta, an industralist and negotiator for the government
- S. M. Zaheer as DGP Prashant Rathod IPS
- Murali Sharma as Naga, Naxalite area commander
- Daya Shankar Pandey as Inspector Raja Ram
- Mukesh Tiwari as Inspector-general of police
- Kiran Karmarkar as Home Minister
- Radhakrishna Dutta as Chief Minister
- Chetan Pandit as Inspector Madhav Rao
- Vinay Apte as Krishna Raj
- Tanvir Singh as Aditya Raj, Prashanth's son
- Anand Suryavanshi as Kamal Kishore IPS
- Sameera Reddy as an item dancer in the song "Kunda Khol" (special appearance)

== Production ==
The film was shot in Panchmarhi and Bhopal.

== Release ==
=== Marketing ===
Prakash Jha launched an online comic series as part of the film's promotions, which highlighted social issues.

== Soundtrack ==
The music of the film was composed by Salim–Sulaiman, Aadesh Shrivastava, Shantanu Moitra, Sandesh Shandilya, and Vijay Verma. The lyrics were written by Irshad Kamil, Panchhi Jalonvi, Ashish Sahu, and A. M. Turaz.

Chakravyuh

Soundtrack album by Salim–Sulaiman, Aadesh Shrivastava, Shantanu Moitra, Sandesh Shandilya and Vijay Verma
- Released: 5 October 2012
- Recorded: 2012
- Genre: Feature film soundtrack
- Language: Hindi
- Label: Sony Music India

Track listing
| No. | Title | Lyrics | Music | Singer(s) | Length |
|---|---|---|---|---|---|
| 1. | "Mehangi" | A. M. Turaz | Vijay Verma | Kailash Kher |
| 2. | "Chhen Ke Lenge" | Irshad Kamil | Salim–Sulaiman | Sukhwinder Singh |
| 3. | "Kunda Khol" | Ashish Sahu | Sandesh Shandilya | Sunidhi Chauhan |
| 4. | "Aiyo Piyaji" | Irshad Kamil | Shantanu Moitra | Rashid Ali Khan |
| 5. | "Tambai" | Irshad Kamil | Salim–Sulaiman | Salim Merchant, Benny Dayal, Shadab Faridi |
| 6. | "Paro" | Panchhi Jalonvi | Aadesh Shrivastava | Shaan, Aadesh Shrivastava, |
| 7. | "Mehangi (Remix)" | A. M. Turaz | Vijay Verma | Instrumental |
| 8. | "Chakrayuvh (Theme)" | Instrumental | Salim–Sulaiman | Benny Dayal |

== Reception ==
=== Critical response ===
The Times of India gave 3.5 stars out of 5, writing "Chakravyuh is a hard film to make and marks must be given to Jha for sticking his neck out. Staying true to the subject, he gives us an insight into uncomfortable truths unfolding in our backyard. He is one of the few filmmakers with such audacious work to his credit". Subhash K. Jha of Indo-Asian News Service gave 4/5 stars and called it a "resolutely etched, firmly grounded drama".

Bikas Bhagat of Zee News gave 4/5 stars and wrote in their review, "Here’s a fight which we have heard about and seen through the ages – the fight between the Capitalists and the Communists. Prakash Jha presents it in his own way; and going by illustrious line of work, it would be a big mistake on your part if you happen to give 'Chakravyuh' a miss". Sukanya Verma of Rediff gave 2.5/5 stars and wrote, "Chakravyuh maintains an aggressive cinematic tone with sufficient stock of blood and action to dole, but is nothing more than an average action flick in the garb of relevant cinema". Hindustan Times gave 2.5 out of 5 stars and wrote "Chakravyuh is, ultimately, a victim of typical Bollywood excesses".

=== Box office ===
Chakravyuh had an opening of ₹1.5 crore (US$160,000) in first three days in India. The film had a low first week where it collected ₹158.8 million (US$1.6 million). Overseas, the film grossed $300,000 in an extended 5-day weekend.

== Awards and nominations ==
| Award | Category | Recipients and nominees | Result | Ref. |
|---|---|---|---|---|
| 5th Mirchi Music Awards | Raag-Inspired Song of the Year | "Aiyo Piyaji" | Nominated | |
