= Damul =

1985 Indian film by Prakash Jha

- Poster
- Directed by: Prakash Jha
- Written by: Shaiwal
- Produced by: Prakash Jha
- Starring: Annu Kapoor; Sreela Majumdar; Manohar Singh; Deepti Naval; Ranjan Kamath; Pyare Mohan Sahay
- Cinematography: Rajen Kothari
- Music by: Raghunath Seth
- Release date: 31 December 1984
- Running time: 106 min
- Country: India
- Language: Hindi
- Budget: ₹12 lakh (US$14,000)

Damul (English: Bonded until Death) is a 1985 Indian Hindi-language film directed by Prakash Jha, based on the story Kaalsootra, by Shaiwal, a native of Gaya district of Bihar, starring Annu Kapoor, Sreela Majumdar, Manohar Singh, Deepti Naval, Ranjan Kamath and Pyare Mohan Sahay in lead roles.

== Plot ==
The story is about a bonded labourer who is forced to steal for his landlord, to whom he is bonded until death. Set in rural Bihar of 1984, the film focuses on the caste politics and the oppression of the lower castes in the region, through bonded labour. The film also highlights the issue of heavy migration of the poor villagers of Bihar to richer states like Punjab in search of livelihood.

== Awards ==
- 1984: National Film Award for Best Feature Film
- 1985: Filmfare Critics Award for Best Movie

== International acclaim ==
Damul was invited for both the competition and participation sections at the Montreal, Chicago and Moscow film festivals.
