= Apaharan =

2005 Indian film by Prakash Jha

- Theatrical release poster
- Directed by: Prakash Jha
- Screenplay by: Prakash Jha; Manoj Tyagi; Shridhar Raghavan
- Story by: Prakash Jha
- Produced by: Prakash Jha
- Starring: Ajay Devgn; Nana Patekar; Bipasha Basu
- Cinematography: Arvind Kumar
- Edited by: Santosh Mandal
- Music by: Songs: Aadesh Shrivastava; Score: Wayne Sharpe
- Production companies: Entertainment One; Prakash Jha Productions; Holi Cow Pictures
- Distributed by: Reliance Entertainment
- Release date: 2 December 2005
- Running time: 173 minutes
- Country: India
- Language: Hindi
- Box office: ₹231.6 million

Apaharan (transl. Abduction) is a 2005 Indian Hindi-language crime drama film written and directed by Prakash Jha. The film stars Ajay Devgn, Bipasha Basu, and Nana Patekar in the lead roles. It revolves around the complex relationship and clashing ideologies between a father and a son set in the backdrop of the kidnapping industry in the eastern state of Bihar, India.

Apaharan was released on 2 December 2005 and was a commercial success at the box-office.

== Plot ==
Ajay Shastri, an unemployed graduate, dreams of joining the police force but faces opposition from his principled father, Raghuvansh Shastri. Desperate, he borrows money and bribes officials, but when his father exposes the corruption, Ajay turns to crime. A failed kidnapping lands him in trouble with Gaya Singh, a henchman of powerful MLA and underworld don Tabrez Alam.

Ajay eventually joins Tabrez's gang and rises to power in Bihar's kidnapping racket. However, political betrayals and his father's moral influence lead him to turn against Tabrez. After being imprisoned, Ajay kills Tabrez when he visits him in jail but is gunned down in return, ending both their lives.

== Cast ==
- Ajay Devgn as Ajay Shastri
- Nana Patekar as Tabrez Alam
- Ayub Khan as Kashinath
- Murali Sharma as Muralidhar
- Bipasha Basu as Megha Basu
- Khalid Siddiqui as Kamal Kishore
- Yashpal Sharma as Gaya Singh
- Mohan Agashe as Professor Raghuvansh Shastri
- Mukesh Tiwari as SP Anwar Khan
- Daya Shankar Pandey as Daya Shankar
- Akhilendra Mishra as Chief Minister Brijnath Mishra
- Chetan Pandit as Home Minister Dinkar Pandey
- Prithvi Zutshi as Dwarka
- Saurabh Dubey as Anil Shrivastava
- Sanjay Swaraj as Seth Chandmal
- Ashwini Kalsekar as Mrs. Khan, Anwar Khan's wife
- Anup Soni as Akash Ranjan, Aaj Tak news reporter
- Pankaj Tripathi as Gaya Singh's crony
- Ehsaan Khan as DSP Veerendra Shukla
- Anil Yadav as Naga
- Deepak Bhatia as Ramdhani Singh
- Brij Gopal as Jagannath Mandal
- Radhakrishna Dutta as Seth Soorajmal
- Mukul Nag as Usman
- Padam Singh as Dharam Singh
- Mrinalini Sharma as Sonia
- Vikram Sahu as Megha's father
- Jayashankar Tripathi as Bankalal's brother-in-law
- Arvind Pandey as Sukhi Chacha
- Shreechand Makhija as Buchchi Kaka, Shastri's servant
- Yusuf Hussain as Tabrez's advocate

== Music ==
Title	Singer(s)	Lyrics	Music
"Aaiye Aao Ji Babu"	Sapna Mukherjee, KK	Sameer	Aadesh Shrivastava

== Awards and nominations ==
Award	Category	Recipients and nominees	Result	Ref.
National Film Awards(India)	Best Screenplay	Prakash Jha, Manoj Tyagi and Shridhar Raghavan	Won	
Filmfare Awards	Best Dialogue	Prakash Jha	Won	
Filmfare Awards	Best Villain	Nana Patekar	Won	
Annual Central European Bollywood Awards (India)	Best Supporting Actress(Popular Award)	Bipasha basu	Nominated	
