= Prakash Jha =

Indian film director and producer (born 1952)

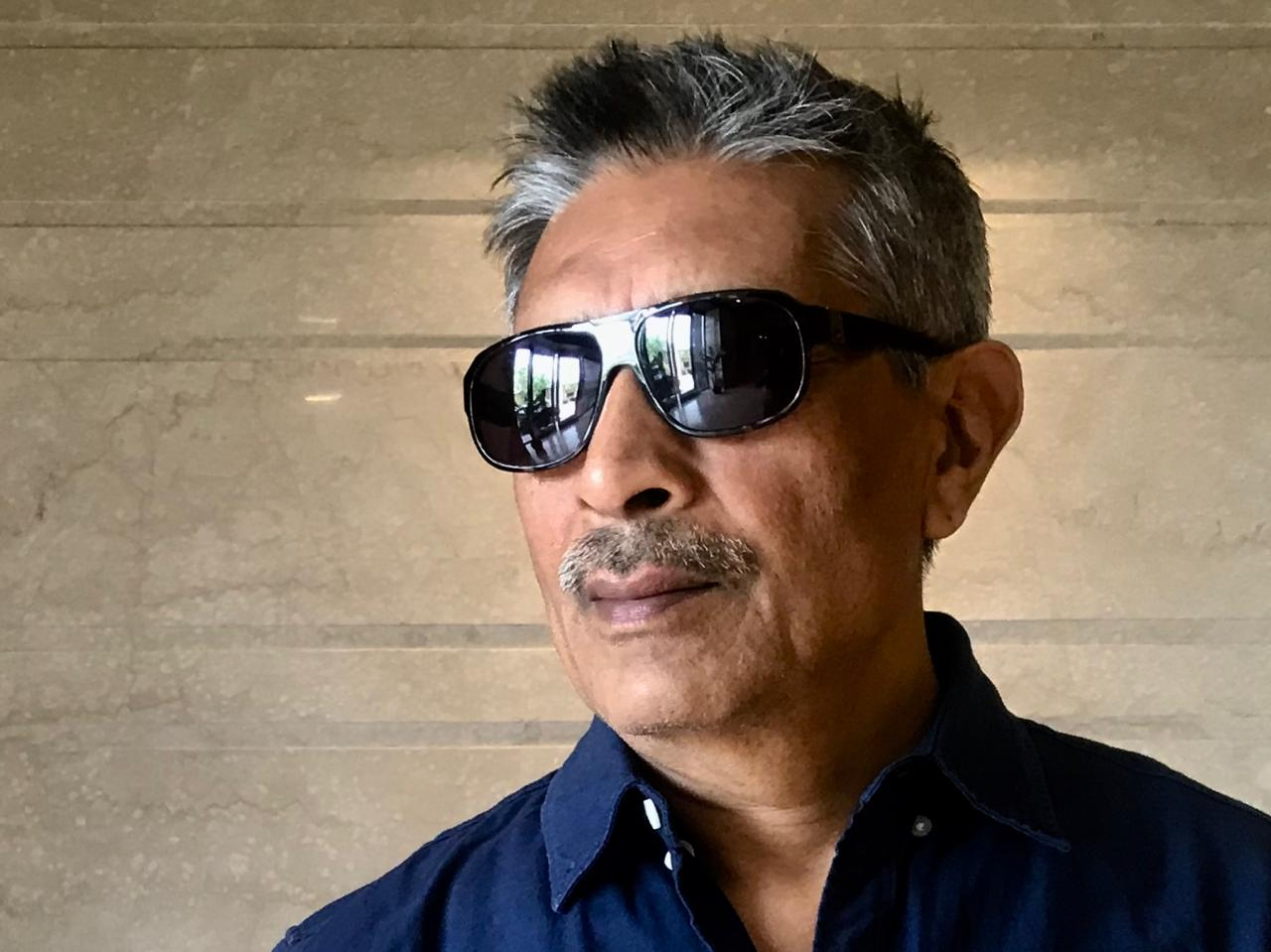
- Born: 27 February 1952 (age 74); Bettiah, Bihar, India
- Occupations: Film producer; director; screenwriter; actor
- Years active: 1982–present
- Spouse: Deepti Naval (m. 1985; div. 2002)
- Children: Disha Jha (daughter), Manish K Jha (nephew)
- Parents: Tej Nath Jha (father); Vijaya Jha (mother)
- Website: prakashjhaproductions.com

Prakash Jha (born 27 February 1952) is an Indian filmmaker and actor known for his political and socio-political films such as Hip Hip Hurray (1984), Damul (1984), Mrityudand (1997), Gangaajal (2003), Apaharan (2005), and his multi-starrer films, Raajneeti (2010), Aarakshan (2011), Chakravyuh (2012), and Satyagraha (2013). He is also the maker of National Film Award winning documentaries like Faces After The Storm (1984) and Sonal (2002).

He runs a production company, Prakash Jha Productions. He also owns the P&M Mall in Patna and the P&M Hi-Tech City Centre Mall in Jamshedpur.

== Early life and education ==
Prakash Jha was raised at his family's farm in Barharwa, Bettiah, West Champaran, Bihar, India. His father's name was Shri Tej Nath Jha and Mother's name was Smt. Vijaya Jha. He did his schooling from Sainik School Tilaya, Koderma district and Kendriya Vidyalaya No. 1, Bokaro Steel City, Jharkhand. Later, he joined Ramjas College, Delhi University to do BSc (Hons) in Physics, though he left his studies after one year, and decided to go to Bombay (present-day Mumbai) and become a painter. While he was preparing for J.J. School of Arts, he happened to witness the shooting of the film Dharma and got hooked on filmmaking. He graduated from KC College, Mumbai

He joined the Film and Television Institute of India (FTII), Pune in 1973, to do a course in editing. Midway through it, the institution was closed for while due to student agitation, so he came to Bombay, started working, and never went back to complete the course.

== Personal life ==
Prakash was married to actress Deepti Naval with whom he has an adopted daughter Disha Jha. Prakash also has a brother Prabhat Jha who is based in Bihar and a sister Sangita Jha. He has a nephew Manish K Jha who is marketing Director of P&M Mall.

== Career ==
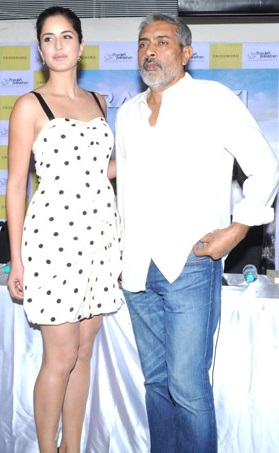
Katrina Kaif and Prakash Jha during the promotion of Rajneeti (2010)

While still midway through his course, he started working on films independently in 1974. He made his first documentary, Under the Blue, in 1975, and continued to do so for the next eight years.

During this period he made some highly politically charged documentaries, like that on the Bihar Sharif riot, titled, Faces After Storm (1984). It received considerable attention, as it was banned within 4–5 days of its release, though later it won the National Film Award for Best Non-Feature Film for the year.

He made his debut as a feature film director with Hip Hip Hurray in 1984, scripted by Gulzar and starring Raj Kiran and Deepti Naval as leads. Next came the film he received most recognition for, Damul (1984), which won the National Film Award for Best Feature Film and the Filmfare Critics Award for Best Movie in 1985. The film was based on the bonded labour issue in Bihar.

In 1986, he directed Parinati, based on the story by Vijaydan Detha.

Over the years he has made over 25 documentaries, 13 feature films, two television features and three television series, including the popular TV serial Mungerilal Ke Hasin Sapne. His production company has produced five films with independent directors.

In 2004, Jha directed the 112-minute film Loknayak, based on the life of Bharat Ratna Jayaprakash Narayan. In the film, Chetan Pandit played the role of Narayan and Tisca Chopra played Prabhavati Devi, the wife of JP.

In 2010, Jha directed Raajneeti, a contemporary take on the epic Mahabharata. It starred Ajay Devgan, Manoj Bajpai, Naseeruddin Shah, Katrina Kaif, Arjun Rampal, Nana Patekar and Ranbir Kapoor, and was a critical and commercial success. His next venture was Aarakshan, which starred Amitabh Bachchan, Saif Ali Khan Deepika Padukone and Prateik Babbar. In 2012, Jha's release Chakravyuh starred Arjun Rampal, Abhay Deol, Manoj Bajpai, Kabir Bedi and Esha Gupta, and was released in Dussehra 2012. His next film Satyagraha (2013) starred Amitabh Bachchan and Ajay Devgn.

In 2019, he acted in the film Saand Ki Aankh a biographical film directed by Tushar Hiranandani. He played Rattan Singh Tomar, the patriarch of the Tomar family.

In 2026, his next directorial venture is reportedly a Political drama titled Janadesh.

== Politics ==
Prakash Jha contested and lost the 14th Lok Sabha election from his native place Bettiah in 2004. He stood 6th and managed to get around 26,000 votes only, while the winner Raghunath Jha got 2,11,590 votes. He also lost the 15th Lok Sabha election to Sanjay Jaiswal in 2009 as Lok Janshakti Party (LJP) candidate from Paschim Champaran. In the same election Sadhu Yadav stood 3rd as INC candidate.

Jha once again contested in the 16th Lok Sabha election in 2014 as a Janata Dal (United) candidate from Paschim Champaran and lost to Sanjay Jaiswal. In 2014 election affidavit he had mentioned that he has assets worth ₹92.5 crores and liabilities worth ₹55.2 crores.

== Social initiatives ==
=== Anubhooti ===
Prakash Jha is the chairman of Anubhooti, a registered society that has been working for cultural development, improvement of health care, disaster management and the upliftment of farmers and socio-economically backward people in Bihar since 1991.

Most recently, the organization has been working for flood survivors. After the Kosi flood on 18 August 2008, Anubhooti has provided complete relief to 6000 people since September 2008. Anubhooti has created a model village, Hindolwa village, for those the flood affected, and is working towards their complete rehabilitation. Anubhooti has provided relief to 5000 people for health care in Supaul district in Bihar.

== Filmography ==
=== Film ===
Year	Title	Director	Screenwriter	Producer	Notes
1984	Hip Hip Hurray	Yes	No	No	
1985	Damul	Yes	Yes	Yes	National Film Award for Best Feature Film
1989	Parinati	Yes	No	Yes	
1996	Bandish	Yes	No	Yes	
1997	Mrityudand	Yes	Dialogues	Yes	Also editor
1999	Dil Kya Kare	Yes	Story	No	Also editor
2001	Rahul	Yes	No	No	
2003	Gangaajal	Yes	Yes	Yes	Also editor; National Film Award for Best Film on Other Social Issues
2004	Loknayak	Yes	Yes	Yes	Also editor
2005	Apaharan	Yes	Story	Yes	National Film Award for Best Screenplay
2007	Dil Dosti etc.	No	No	Yes	
2007	Khoya Khoya Chand	No	No	Yes	
2010	Raajneeti	Yes	Dialogues	Yes	
2011	Turning 30	No	No	Yes	
2011	Yeh Saali Zindagi	No	No	Yes	
2011	Aarakshan	Yes	Yes	Yes	
2012	Chakravyuh	Yes	Yes	Yes	
2013	Satyagraha	Yes	Yes	Yes	
2015	Crazy Cukkad Family	No	No	Yes	
2016	Jai Gangaajal	Yes	Yes	Yes	Also actor
2016	Lipstick Under My Burkha	No	No	Yes	
2019	Fraud Saiyaan	No	No	Yes	
2019	Pareeksha	Yes	No	Yes	ZEE5 film

=== Documentary films ===
Year	Title	Director	Writer	Producer
1976	Rhythms of a Land and Its People	Yes	No	No
1978	Friends Together	Yes	No	No
1979	Ode To The Child	Yes	No	No
1981	Pas De Deux	Yes	No	Yes
1981	Face After The Storm	Yes	No	No
1982	Shree Vats	Yes	No	No
1983	May I Think, Sir?	Yes	No	No
1986	Tradition	Yes	No	No
1986	End Without End	Yes	No	No
1986	Kudiattam	Yes	No	No
1987	Another History	Yes	No	No
1988	Looking Back	Yes	No	No
1988	An Expression	Yes	No	No
1988	Abhishapt	Yes	No	No
1989	The Story of Madhopur	Yes	No	No
1990	Tribal Festival	Yes	No	No
1994	Didi	Yes	Yes	Yes
2002	Sonal	Yes	No	No
2004	Loknayak	Yes	No	No

==== Acting Roles ====
Year	Title	Role
2016	Jai Gangaajal	DSP Bhola Nath Singh
2019	Saand Ki Aankh	Rattan Singh Tomar
2022	Matto Ki Saikil	Matto
2023	Rafuchakkar	Pawan's father

=== Television ===
Year	Title	Creator	Director	Writer	Producer
1989	Mungerilal Ke Haseen Sapne	No	Yes	No	No
2020-2025	Aashram	Yes	Yes	No	Yes
2026	Sankalp	No	Yes	No	No

== Awards and nominations ==
=== National Film Awards ===
- 1984: National Film Award for Best Non-Feature Film: Faces After The Storm (1984)
- 1985: National Film Award for Best Feature Film: Damul (1985)
- 1987: National Film Award for Best Arts/Cultural Film: Kudiattam
- 1988: National Film Award for Best Costume Design: Parinati
- 1988: National Film Award for Best Industrial Documentary: Looking Back
- 2002: National Film Award for Best Non-Feature Film: Sonal
- 2004: National Film Award for Best Film on Other Social Issues: Gangaajal (2003)
- 2006: National Film Award for Best Screenplay: Apaharan (2005)

=== Filmfare Awards ===
- 2001: Best Documentary of the Year: Faces After The Storm (1983)
- 1985: Filmfare Critics Award for Best Film: Damul (1985)
- 2006: Filmfare Award for Best Dialogue: Apaharan (2005)

=== Star Screen Awards ===
- 2005: Screen Award for Best Screenplay: Apaharan
- 2011: Screen Award for Best Screenplay: Raajneeti

=== Filmfare OTT Awards ===
Year	Category	Work	Result	Ref.
2021	Best Series – Drama	Aashram	Nominated	
2021	Best Director – Drama, Series	Aashram	Nominated	

=== ITA Awards ===
Year	Category	Work	Result	Ref.
2021	Best Landmark OTT Show	Aashram	Won	
