= Rakthacharithram =

2010 crime thriller

- Theatrical release poster of Hindi version
- Directed by: Ram Gopal Varma
- Written by: Prashant Pandey
- Produced by: Madhu Mantena; Chinna Vasudeva Reddy; Sheetal Vinod Talwar
- Starring: Vivek Oberoi; Sudeep; Abhimanyu Singh; Shatrughan Sinha; Radhika Apte; Kota Srinivasa Rao; Sushant Singh; Raja Krishnamoorthy; Zarina Wahab; Sushmita Mukherjee; Vishwajeet Pradhan; Ashish Vidyarthi
- Narrated by: Chetan Sashital (Hindi); Ram Gopal Varma (Telugu)
- Cinematography: Amol Rathod
- Edited by: Nipun Ashok Gupta
- Music by: Bapi Tutul; Dharam–Sandeep; Imran–Vikram; Sukhwinder Singh
- Production companies: RGV Film Factory; Cinergy Films
- Distributed by: Cinergy
- Release date: 22 October 2010
- Running time: 125 minutes (theatrical version)
- Country: India
- Languages: Telugu; Hindi

Rakthacharitam (Note: History of Blood; titled in Hindi as Rakta Charitra.) is a 2010 Indian biographical political action thriller film directed by Ram Gopal Varma and written by Prashant Pandey, featuring an ensemble cast of Vivek Oberoi, Sudeep, Abhimanyu Singh, Shatrughan Sinha, Radhika Apte, Kota Srinivasa Rao, Sushant Singh, Raja Krishnamoorthy, Zarina Wahab, Sushmita Mukherjee, Vishwajeet Pradhan and Ashish Vidyarthi. The film is based on the blood-soaked political rivalries, gang wars and factionalism that plagued the Ananthapuram district of Andhra Pradesh over a span of 15 years between political parties on the backing of crime syndicates and networks.

Shot simultaneously in Telugu and Hindi, the film was released on 22 October 2010. A direct sequel Rakthacharithram 2 was released later that year. Upon release, the film received controversies for its portrayal of extreme violence and political content, however was met with widespread critical acclaim, with praise towards the story, screenplay, direction, cinematography, dialogues, and realistic approach. Due to the film's depiction of extreme violence, multiple scenes and dialogues were removed from the A-rated theatrical version by the Central Board of Film Certification (CBFC); the U/A rated home media version itself re-censored and deleted around seventeen minutes of footage, and as such, the theatrical version has become rare. Despite emerging as a flop during its theatrical run, the film has gained cult status and is regarded as one of Oberoi's best performances and Varma's best works, alongside Company (2002), Satya (1998) and Sarkar franchise.

== Plot ==
Narasimha Deva Reddy (Raja Krishnamoorthy), the undisputed and iron-fisted MLA of the faction-ridden, blood-soaked province of Ananthapura in Andhra Pradesh, leans heavily on his most loyal ally, Veerabhadra (Rajendra Gupta), to control the grassroots. Veerabhadra is given the freedom to nominate candidates for the zilla parishad elections and commands immense reverence among the poor and oppressed, who revere him as their messiah. Seeing this growing influence, Nagamani Reddy (Kota Srinivasa Rao), Narasimha's younger brother and an envious political associate, poisons his brother's ears by alleging that Veerabhadra is plotting to usurp his throne. A wary Narasimha summons Veerabhadra and abruptly rescinds the election tickets allotted to his followers. Veerabhadra fiercely lashes out against Narasimha for betraying the underprivileged and storms away.

Seizing the fallout, Nagamani abducts Veerbhadra’s trusted lieutenant Mandha (Ashish Vidyarthi) and coerces him into committing regicide. Nagamani promises Mandha that if he executes Veerabhadra, public suspicion will naturally destroy Veerabhadra's legacy—making Mandha the undisputed champion of the poor—warning him that refusal means certain death. Mandha yields to the threat. Shortly after, as Veerabhadra and his wife Nari (Zarina Wahab) travel on a passenger bus with dozens of commuters, Nagamani's henchmen and Mandha intercept the vehicle, execute the escorts, and threaten to massacre every innocent passenger unless Veerabhadra steps out. Veerbhadra steps down to face his betrayers, defiantly daring Mandha to pull the trigger. Nagamani’s gunman Durga (Chetanya Adib) opens fire, framing Mandha in the crowd, before reminding Mandha of his pact. Mandha heaves a massive boulder and crushes Veerabhadra’s skull in plain view of the horrified passengers, killing him instantly.

The gruesome assassination triggers a ferocious rebellion spearheaded by Veerabhadra’s elder son, Shankar Veerabhadra (Sushant Singh). Burning for vengeance, Shankar mounts a bloody purge against the syndicate, culminating in Durga being decapitated and his head impaled on a roadside spike. In retaliation, Nagamani unleashes his psychopathic, predatory younger son, Bukka Reddy (Abhimanyu Singh). Bukka establishes a reign of pure terror across the arid badlands—raping women at will and slaughtering Shankar’s loyalists through nightmarish means: burning them alive, slicing their heads off with sugarcane choppers, drilling holes into their flesh, and tossing them down wells to be eaten alive by ravenous rats.

Meanwhile, Veerabhadra's youngest son, Pratap Ravindra Veerabhadra (Vivek Oberoi), returns from college upon receiving word of the bloodbath. Before he can reunite with his brother, Nagamani bribes Inspector Gajapathi Rao, who kills Shankar in a staged encounter. When a distressed Pratap arrives at the station demanding answers, Gajapathi sneeringly reveals Shankar’s battered corpse. Consumed by blind fury, Pratap and his father's fighters storm the outpost, butchering the corrupt policemen and slaughtering Gajapathi on the spot. A frantic Nari begs Narasimha and Nagamani for mercy toward Pratap, only to be cast out into the streets.

Pratap retreats into the dense jungles with his father's guerrilla faction, swearing an oath to methodically exterminate Narasimha, Mandha, and Nagamani—enforcing psychological torture by staggering each assassination to let pure terror fester. His retribution begins at midnight: Pratap’s squad assaults Narasimha’s heavily fortified estate, gunning down the perimeter guards before Pratap hacks Narasimha to death with a sickle right before the horrified eyes of his wife, Gomathi (Sushmita Mukherjee). Soon after, Bukka corners Nari to butcher her, but she is rescued in the nick of time by Gajapathi’s replacement, Inspector Ashwini Sinha (Ashwini Kalsekar). Nari escapes to join Pratap in hiding, accompanied by Shankar’s grieving widow Haritha (Pragathi) and her infant child. While in hiding, Pratap slips back into town to convince his sweetheart Nandini (Radhika Apte) to marry him; her terrified parents (Sukanya Kulkarni and Sanjay Mone) reluctantly give their blessings.

The hit list turns to Mandha. Pratap’s strike unit ambushes him in a crowded bazaar; before Mandha can draw a weapon, his hand is severed clean off. As Mandha grovels on his knees for his life, Pratap drives a blade through his chest in front of the paralyzed public. Next, Pratap turns his sights on Nagamani’s fortress. Disguising his men in police uniforms to bypass the fortified security, Pratap infiltrates the estate lawn and massacres the overconfident Nagamani along with his armed detail. Nagamani’s elimination drives Bukka into an unhinged frenzy, sparking a manic confrontation with Ashwini when she arrives to collect the remains. Her senior officer, SP Kanoonga (Darshan Jariwala), cautions her against escalating a direct war with Bukka, while the cynical, razor-sharp DCP Mohan Prasad (Sudeepa) watches the brewing inferno unfold.

The political landscape shifts when matinee idol-turned-political heavyweight Shivaji Rao (Shatrughan Sinha) ventures into Ananthapura to launch his campaign. Seeking to clear the path for Bukka’s elder brother, Puru Reddy (Vishwajeet Pradhan), Bukka's gang hurls crude explosives at Shivaji’s convoy, forcing the humiliated icon to retreat. Enraged by the affront, Shivaji demands that his chief strategist Ramamoorthy (Tanikella Bharani) find someone capable of breaking Bukka's spine. Ram immediately presents Pratap Ravi. Shivaji summons the young rebel, offering him a party ticket under the Praja Desham Party (Note: based on Telugu Desam Party) to contest against Puru.

Around this time, Pratap is approached by a limping electrician, Babu Qadri (Om Kumar), who recounts how Bukka abducted, tortured, and raped his sixteen-year-old sister, driving her to self-immolation after the compromised police refused to register a complaint; Bukka subsequently shattered Babu’s leg when he dared to protest. Pratap vows justice, instructing him to bide his time. Simultaneously, a deranged Bukka threatens to execute his own henchmen unless they steal ballot boxes and rig the elections against Pratap. Recognizing that entering the mainstream political arena leaves his ranks vulnerable to ambush, Pratap draws up an exhaustive preemptive hit list. While a clean-shaven Pratap campaigns openly in white attire, his top lieutenants AK (Subrat Dutta) and Omkar (Anupam Shyam) mobilize lethal hit squads across the district, pre-emptively executing over twenty of Bukka's relatives and associates at the barest hint of suspicion.

Despite violent attempts to sabotage the booths, Bukka's men fail and face execution at their own boss's hands. Pratap wins the constituency in a historic landslide, securing a prestigious cabinet portfolio in Shivaji’s newly formed government. Concurrently, Inspector Ashwini traps Bukka on election-murder charges, but Bukka guns her down in cold blood before being restrained and arrested. Fearing that an incarcerated Bukka might take his own life in humiliation, Puru secures his brother's release on bail with the backing of opposition kingpin Naidu.

Hell-bent on assassinating the new minister, Bukka retreats to Flat 102 in the Maheshwari Complex at Masab Tank, assembling an arsenal. Pratap discovers the sanctuary and secures Shivaji's implicit nod to end the menace once and for all. Pratap abducts Bukka’s adolescent servant, bribing him with five lakh rupees to orchestrate an ambush. Enlisting Babu Qadri to spearhead the strike team, Pratap’s men stage an operation disguised as a brothel run for Bukka. The assassins breach Flat 102, cutting down Bukka’s bodyguards in a hail of gunfire. Babu confronts the monster, violently hacking Bukka to pieces with an axe to avenge his sister.

With the Reddy empire demolished, a shattered Puru prostrates himself before Pratap, renouncing politics entirely to beg for his life; viewing Puru as harmless, Pratap spares him. Bukka's gruesome slaughter polarizes Shivaji's cabinet, but the Chief Minister silences dissent by reminding them of the fallen butcher's inhuman atrocities. Under Shivaji's directives, Pratap summons the underworld dons of Ananthapura to a secluded clearing, coldly warning them that factional violence will be met with outright death. Pratap settles into the role of a demigod, presiding over a parallel kangaroo court where locals bypass the formal judiciary to seek swift justice from his hands.

Undetected by Pratap, his supreme dominance breeds fatal complacency. In a mid-credits sequence, a shadowy, vengeful figure, Maddelacheruvu Surya Reddy (Suriya), watches Pratap's ascendance from the shadows, plotting a ruthless vendetta to annihilate Pratap for wiping out his kin.

== Cast ==
- Vivek Oberoi as Pratap Ravindra Veerabhadra, Veerabhadra's younger son who unleashes a vendetta across Andhra Pradesh against his father's and brother's murderers. At the end of the film, he becomes a minister in Andhra Pradesh Legislative Assembly. He was the main leader of the Paritala factions in the gang wars of Andhra Pradesh, leading him to be the most wanted enemy of Reddy syndicate (based on Paritala Ravindra).
- Sudeep as DCP Dasari Mohan Prasad, a police officer in Andhra Pradesh who seeks to put an end to the factionalism in Ananthapuram. He initially makes multiple negotiations with Pratap Ravi, but later allows him to continue the murders in order to dismantle the Reddy empire (based on R. S. Praveen Kumar and K. S. Vyas).
- Abhimanyu Singh as Bukka Reddy, Nagamani Reddy's elder son; a violent, infamous criminal known for his ruthless behaviour and the main antagonist. He later became the Reddy syndicate's leader, after the deaths of his father, Nagamani and uncle, Narasimha (based on Sane Obul Reddy).
- Shatrughan Sinha as Chief Minister Shivaji Rao, the leader of the Praja Desam Party (PDP) and later the Chief Minister of Andhra Pradesh; Pratap's mentor (based on N. T. Rama Rao).
- Radhika Apte as Kattula Nandini Pratap, Pratap Ravi's wife (based on Paritala Sunitha).
- Kota Srinivasa Rao as Nagamani Reddy, Narasimha Reddy's brother and right-hand man in politics who have developed a great envy for Veerabhadra (based on Sane Chenna Reddy).
- Rajendra Gupta as Veerabhadra, Pratap and Shankar's father who was the trusted ally of Narasimha Deva Reddy. He was killed by his own associate, Mandha, on the manipulation of Nagamani Reddy. Veerabhadra's death had triggered the long-lasting gang wars in Andhra Pradesh between the Paritala and Reddy factions.
- Sushant Singh as Shankar Veerabhadra, Pratap's elder brother and Veerabhadra's elder son, who firstly vows revenge for his father's assassination. He was killed Bukka Reddy's allies which made Pratap to return to Ananthapuram (based on Paritala Harindra).
- Raja Krishnamoorthy as Narasimha Deva Reddy, MLA of Ananthapuram and Nagamani Reddy's elder brother; Veerabhadra's ally turned-enemy.
- Zarina Wahab as Nari, Pratap's mother and Veerabhadra's wife.
- Sushmita Mukherjee as Gomathi, Narasimha's wife.
- Ashish Vidyarthi as Mandha, Veerabhadra's friend who later betrays and kills him, on the threatening of Nagamani Reddy.
- Vishwajeet Pradhan as Puru Reddy, Bukka Reddy's younger brother and Nagamani Reddy's younger son.
- Ashwini Kalsekar as Inspector Ashwini Sinha, Pratap's ally in Ananthapura Police and the replacement of Kanoonga; junior officer under Mohan Prasad.
- Darshan Jariwala as SP Kanoonga, Bukka Reddy's ally who killed Shankar, in order to cease the factionalism.
- Tanikella Bharani as Ramamoorthy
- Pragathi as Haritha, Shankar's wife
- Subhalekha Sudhakar as Swami, a hypocrite politician who exploits Bukka Reddy's revenge against Pratap Ravi.
- Subrat Dutta as AK, Pratap Ravi's hitman who helps Pratap in plotting assassination against Narasimha and Nagamani.
- Anupam Shyam as Omkar, another hitman of Pratap Ravi; partner of AK.
- Om Kumar as Babu Qadri, a paralyzed prisoner in Anantapur Prisoners' Agricultural Colony whose sister was raped by Bukka Reddy, leading to her self-immolescence. He later gains Pratap's trust and friendship by expressing his hate and revenge against Nagamani and Bukka.
- Chetanya Adib as Durga, Nagamani Reddy's hitman who killed Veerabhadra in public and framed Mandha as the killer.
- Sukanya Kulkarni as Nandini's mother
- Sanjay Mone as Nandini's father
- Suriya as Maddelacheruvu Surya Narasimha Reddy, Narasimha's elder son who awaits his chance for revenge against Pratap Ravi for his family's murder, which was orchestrated by Pratap's hitmen during the election purge across Ananthapuram and Hyderabad (cameo appearance; based on Gangula Suryanarayana Reddy).

== Soundtrack ==
Rakta Charitra

Soundtrack album by Imran-Vikram, Dharam-Sandeep, Bapi Tutul, and Sukhwinder Singh
- Released: 13 October 2010
- Recorded: 2010
- Genre: Film soundtrack
- Length: 32:46
- Label: T-Series

Hindi tracklist
| No. | Title | Lyrics | Music | Singer(s) | Length |
|---|---|---|---|---|---|
| 1. | "Khaul Khaul Ke" | Sandeep Singh | Imran-Vikram | Jojo, Ujwal | 4:29 |
| 2. | "Mila Toh Marega" | Vayu Shrivastav | Dharam-Sandeep | Ravindra Upadhyay, Vishvesh Parmar, Sandeep Patil | 3:40 |
| 3. | "Paisewala" | Prashant Pandey | Sukhwinder Singh | Sukhwinder Singh | 3:53 |
| 4. | "Maar De" | Shabeer Ahmed | Imran-Vikram | Jojo | 4:17 |
| 5. | "Kaaton Se" | Shyamraj Dutta | Bapi-Tutul | Suresh Wadkar | 4:12 |
| 6. | "Karma Dharma" | Vayu Shrivastav | Dharam-Sandeep | Vardan Singh, Aditi Kaur | 3:08 |
| 7. | "Har Jazbe Mein" | Sarim Momin | Sukhwinder Singh, Bapi-Tutul | Sukhwinder Singh | 4:32 |
| 8. | "Paisa Mix" | Prashant Pandey | Sukhwinder Singh | Sukhwinder Singh, Sumitra Iyer | 4:35 |
| Total length: | | | | | 32:46 |

== Reception ==
Taran Adarsh of Bollywood Hungama gave 4 out of 5 stars, describing it as a powerful, dark, and exceptionally violent film not meant for the faint-hearted. Nikhat Kazmi of The Times of India gave 3 out of 5 stars, stating that "Rakta Charitra holds up a brutal mirror on the muck that masquerades as democracy in India". Rajeev Masand of CNN-IBN gave 3 out of 5 stars, noting that "Rakta Charitra is a bold, disturbing film that’s bursting with the kind of confidence we haven’t seen from the filmmaker recently. If the sight of blood doesn’t make you uncomfortable, chances are you’ll enjoy this film". Kittu Singh of Rediff gave 2.5 out of 5 stars, writing that "Once the film is over you realise that all Rakta Charitra has been is a two-hour promotional fare for Rakta Charitra 2. Yes, there is more to come". Shubhra Gupta of The Indian Express gave 2.5 stars out of 5 and wrote "It is an interesting story, and Oberoi, re-united with RGV after Company does a good job as Ravi. But the blood overtakes it all: Rakta Charitra is not for the faint-hearted".

== Accolades ==
| Award | Category | Recipient | Result | Notes |
|---|---|---|---|---|
| Screen Awards | Best Actor | Vivek Oberoi | Nominated | |
| Screen Awards | Best Supporting Actress | Zarina Wahab | Nominated | |
| Screen Awards | Best Female Debut | Radhika Apte | Nominated | |
| Screen Awards | Best Action | Javed Eijaz | Nominated | |
| Stardust Awards | Best Film of the Year | Ram Gopal Varma | Nominated | |
| Stardust Awards | Best Director | Ram Gopal Varma | Nominated | |
| Stardust Awards | Best Actor in an Ensemble Cast | Abhimanyu Singh | Nominated | |
| Stardust Awards | Best Actress in an Ensemble Cast | Zarina Wahab | Nominated | |
| Zee Cine Awards | Best Performance in a Negative Role | Abhimanyu Singh | Nominated | |

== Sequel ==
A sequel titled Rakta Charitra 2 was released in December 2010 which featured Suriya, introduced in the mid-credits, as the protagonist; it marked the debut of the Tamil actor into both Hindi and Telugu films.
