= Rajendra Gupta =

Indian actor (born 1947)

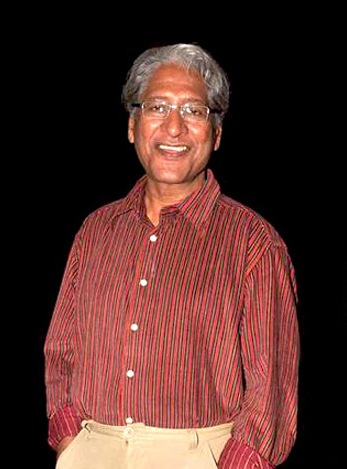
- Born: 17 October 1947 (age 79); Panipat, East Punjab, India (now in Haryana, India)
- Occupation: Actor
- Years active: 1985–present
- Spouse: Veena Gupta
- Children: Ravee Gupta (daughter)

Rajendra Gupta (born 17 October 1947) is an Indian film, television and theatre actor and director who is known for his television roles of Adina Beg Khan Sahib e Azam in 2010 series of Maharaja Ranjit Singh, Pandit Jagannath in the 1990s Doordarshan fantasy television series Chandrakanta and Sudha's father – Jagat Narayan – in the 1998–2001 Sony TV drama Saaya.

An alumnus of the National School of Drama (1972 batch), Gupta has worked in numerous television serials and films. He played the role of the Mukhiya (village headman) of Champaner in the Oscar-nominated 2001 film Lagaan. He also played the role of Kesri Narayan in the TV serial Chidiya Ghar, that aired on Sab TV. He is also a part of Hindi haryanvi big budget film Rukke Padge with actor Gaurav Prateek. Currently, he is portraying the role of Pandit Jagannath Mishra in Jagannath Aur Purvi Ki Dosti Anokhi at Sony TV.

== Life ==
Gupta was born in a business family in Panipat and did his graduation from the Kurukshetra University. His father known as Master Ji ran a woolen textiles business but Gupta had no interest in the business; his interests lay, instead, in dramatics and theatre. Gupta met wife-to-be, Veena, a Christian, in Indore when he went there to take part in a college play. Since Veena's parents did not agree to their marriage, the couple eloped to Bhopal, got married, and then returned home.

In 1972, Gupta enrolled himself at the New Delhi-based National School of Drama and completed his post-graduation in direction.

Gupta's daughter, Ravee Gupta, is a television actress who is married to television actor Manoj Bidwai.

== Career ==
Gupta and his family moved to Bombay in 1985 and he started working in television serials; three years later he entered into the Hindi film industry. Gupta has acted in innumerable television serials and films; so much so that in 1990, his name was included in the Limca Book of Records for appearing in the highest number of television serials – over 40 of them.

In a 2001 interview with the Times of India, he mentioned that of all the films that he has done, he is proud of his work in Lagaan (2001) and Salim Langde Pe Mat Ro (1989). Since then he has gone on to work in critically acclaimed films such as Amu, Sehar and Guru. In the same interview, he said that among his television roles, his work in the Syed Mirza-Kundan Shah serial Intezaar (as the Senior Station Master), the fantasy series Chandrakanta (as Pandit Jagarnath) and Saaya (as Jagat Narayan) were among his best.

In 2025, Gupta starred in A Life Inside Me, an Indian feature film directed by Jackie R. Bala. The film also stars Inayat Qazi and Sonali Sharmishtha and was produced by Mahi Kumar and Ajitesh Gupta. Set against a queer narrative lens, the story explores themes of identity, loss, and resilience. The film premiered at the KASHISH Mumbai International Queer Film Festival and went on to win Best Indian Feature Film (Narrative) and Best of Out & Loud at the Out & Loud Pune International Queer Film Festival.

=== Stage ===
Although Gupta has appeared in numerous films and television serials, theatre remains his primary artistic focus. He has acted in numerous plays and directed at least twenty productions of his own.

Gupta is the actor-director of plays such as Sarphire and Jaheez Hatyare, both based on writer-philosopher Albert Camus' French play The Just Assassins, and Sooraj Ki Antim Kiran Se Sooraj Ke Pehle Kiran Tak, based on Surendra Verma's 1965 Hindi play.

Gupta has acted in many Hindi plays, but Chanakyashastra and Kanyadaan, a play by noted playwright Vijay Tendulkar, are two plays he did in English.

Rajendra Gupta and noted actress Neena Gupta run a theatre production company – Sahaj Productions.

== Filmography ==
=== Film ===
- Jawalaa Dahej Ki (1982)
- Yeh Woh Manzil To Nahin (1987) as Vice-Chancellor Asthana
- Main Zinda Hoon (1988)
- Salim Langde Pe Mat Ro (1989) as Aslam
- Haque (1991) as Nandi - Editor
- Jaan Se Pyaara (1992) as Police Commissioner
- Meri Pyari Nimmo (1993)
- Pratimurti (1993) as Manager
- Taaqat (1995) as Anil Rege
- Tarpan (1995) as Lakhan Thakur
- The Gambler (1995) as Doctor
- Daava (1997) as Advocate Chagan Chamunda
- Bhai (1997) as Malik
- Aaya Yauwan Jhoom Ke (1999)
- Dil Kya Kare (1999) as Lawyer
- Benaam (1999)
- Hum To Mohabbat Karega (2000) as Gul Mahomad
- Mission Kashmir (2000) as Chief Secretary Deshpande
- Raja Ko Rani Se Pyar Ho Gaya (2000) as Mohit's Friend
- Laado (2000) as Urmi's Father-In-Law (Haryanvi Movies)
- Lagaan (2001) as Sarpanch (Mukhiya Ji)
- Tum Bin (2001) as Iftekaar
- Yeh Raaste Hai Pyar Ke (2001) as Doctor
- Shaheed-E-Azam (2002)
- Swaraaj (2003)
- Basti (2003) as Commissioner Jabbar
- Mumbai Se Aaya Mera Dost (2003) as Sameer
- Satya Bol (2004)
- Mr Lonely Miss Lovely (2004)
- Krishna Cottage (2004) as J.C. College's Principal
- Deewaar: Let's Bring Our Heroes Home (2004) as Anand
- Hatya (2004) as Murugan
- Amu (2005) as K.K.
- Sehar (2005) as ADG (Law and Order) Arun Kapoor
- James (2005) as Nalin Yadav
- Koi Aap Sa (2005) as Mahesh - Simran's dad
- Guru (2007) as Kantilal Desai (Guru's Father)
- Cape Karma (2007) as Kamini's Dad
- Apne (2007) as Sardar Bhullar
- Chamku (2008) as Vinod Sood - Home Secretary
- Well Done Abba (2009) as Irrigation Minister - Mantri Garu
- Do Paise Ki Dhoop, Chaar Aane Ki Baarish (2009) as Banker, Taxi Driver
- Striker (2010) as Surya's father
- Aakrosh (2010) as Geeta's father
- Rakht Charitra (2010, Hindi, Telugu, Tamil) as Pratap's father
- Rakta Charitra 2 (2010) as Veera Bhadra
- Rukke Padge (2010) as Mama
- Ek Noor (2011) as Ranjit's father
- "HE..." (2011, Bhojpuri Film)
- Tanu Weds Manu (2011) as Rajendra Trivedi
- Yeh Faasley (2011) as Joe Fernandes
- Trapped in Tradition: Rivaaz (2011) as Mangatram
- He... (2011)
- The Best Exotic Marigold Hotel (2011) as Manoj
- Paan Singh Tomar (2012) as Sports Coach (H.S. Randhawa)
- Maximum (2012) as Babuji
- Riwayat (2012) as Dr. Amod Gupta
- Nirankush (2013)
- Saptapadii (2013) as Terrorist 1
- Himmatwala (2013) as Ravi's Chacha
- Bobby Jasoos (2014) as Abba
- Tanu Weds Manu Returns (2015) as Rajendra Trivedi
- Mohalla Assi (2015) as Babu Lal Dwivedi
- Phamous (2018) as Laali's Father
- Vishwaroopam II (2018) as Seshadri
- PM Narendra Modi (2019) as Damodardas Modi
- Bhavai (2021) as Panditji
- Sooryavanshi (2021) as Naem Khan
- Urf Ghanta (2021) as Doctor
- Chatrapathi (2023)
- Tera Kya Hoga Lovely (2024)
- Kakuda (2024)
- Ulajh (2024) as Miya Ji
- Sadabahar (2024)
- A Life Inside Me (2025) as Kabir
- Maalik (2025) as Bindeshwar, Maalik's father

=== Television ===
- Khauff on Sony SAB (Episode 5 & Episode 6)
- Kahan Gaye Woh Log (1985)
- Yatra (1986) as Drama Group Member (1986-1987)
- Nukkad (1987) as Sudhakar Kadam, Municipal Corporator (3 episodes)
- Bharat Ek Khoj (1988) as Ratansen / Raja Nandkumar
- Mirza Ghalib (1988)
- Intezaar (1989) as the Senior Station Master
- Talaash (1992) as Fardu
- Chekhov ki Duniya (Indian TV series) (1990s) (The serial was a Hindi language adaptation of the selected short stories of Russian writer Anton Chekhov) as the narrator of the serial and also as an actor in different roles depending on the short story being played out in the episodes.
- Byomkesh Bakshi (1993) as Mahidhar Chowdhury (Episode: Tasvir Chor)
- Chandrakanta (1994-1996) as Pandit Jagannath/Shani (Twin Brother of Pandit Jagannath)
- Shaktimaan (1996) as Dr Vishwas, Geeta Vishwas's Father and a paranormal scientist
- Byomkesh Bakshi(Season 2) (1997) as Santosh Samaddar (Episode: Balak Jasoos)
- Saaya (1998) as Jagat Narayan
- Ullanghan (1999)
- Jai Ganesha (1999, TV Series) as Narada
- Choti Si Aasha (1999)
- Aashirwad (1998)
- Khara Dudh for DD Punjabi
- Parsa (2004)
- Raavan (2005-2008) as Sumali
- Banoo Main Teri Dulhan (2006) as Raghav Pratap Singh
- Kuchh Is Tara (2007-2008) as Anand Godbole
- Ranbir Rano (2008) as Rano's Father (2008)
- Hum Ladkiyan (2008) as Thakur Ayodhya Singh
- Maharaja Ranjit Singh (2010–2011) as Subedar of Hoshiarpur Adina Beg Azam
- Balika Vadhu (2009–2012) as Mahaveer Singh
- Chidiya Ghar (2011–2017) as Kesri Narayan
- Kahaani Chandrakanta Ki (2011) as Pandit Jagannath
- Rehna Hai Teri Palkon Ki Chhaon Mein(2009) as Surya Partap Thakur
- Samvidhaan (2014) as Dr. Rajendra Prasad
- Gujarat Bhavan, Ishara TV
- Jagannath Aur Purvi Ki Dosti Anokhi as Pt. Jagannath Mishra (2022)
- Bed Stories as Ramdas (2022)
- Maamla Legal Hai (2024) as Tyagi
- Black Warrant (2025)

=== Stage ===
As director

- Sarphire / Jaheez Hatyare (1985, 2003, 2004, 2006)
- Sooraj Ki Antim Kiran Se Sooraj Ke Pehle Kiran Tak
- Dikhti..Khoob Ho!

As actor

- Sarphire
- Sar Sar Sarla
- Sooraj Ki Antim Kiran Se Sooraj Ke Pehle Kiran Tak
- Chanakyashastra
- Kanyadaan
- Dikhti..Khoob Ho!

== Awards ==
- Gupta won a RAPA Award in 2000 for his performance in Saaya.
