= Pankaj Kapur =

Indian actor (born 1954)

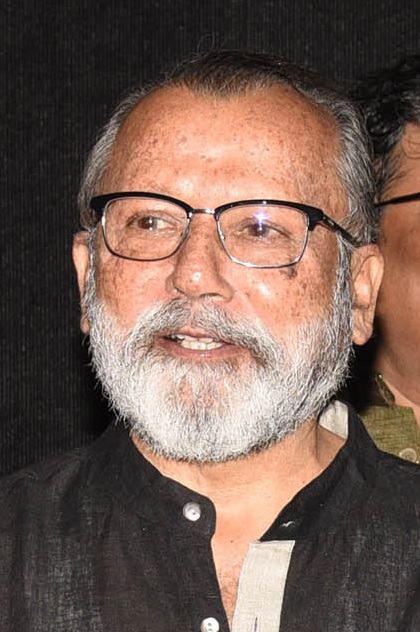
- Kapur in 2022
- Born: 29 May 1954 (age 72); Ludhiana, Punjab, India
- Education: National School of Drama
- Occupations: Actor, story writer, screenwriter, director
- Years active: 1976–present
- Spouse: Neelima Azeem (m. 1979; div. 1984) Supriya Pathak (m. 1988)
- Children: Shahid Kapoor
- Relatives: Kapoor-Pathak family

Pankaj Kapur (born 29 May 1954) is an Indian actor who works in Hindi theatre, television and films. A recipient of a Filmfare Award and three National Film Awards, his most acclaimed film roles include that of Inspector P.K. in Raakh (1989), Dr. Dipankar Roy in Ek Doctor Ki Maut (1991) and Abba ji in Maqbool (2004), the latter based on Shakespeare's King Duncan in Vishal Bhardwaj's adaptation of Macbeth. He played the role of Grandpa in the series Thode Door Thode Paas.

In the 1980s, he became a household name through the TV series Karamchand, a comedy television series in the detective genre. And in the millennium, Office Office, a comic satire on prevalent corruption in India.

In 1988, he married his second wife, actress Supriya Pathak, daughter of actress Dina Pathak, with whom he has a daughter and a son. His sister-in-law is actress Ratna Pathak Shah, who is married to actor Naseeruddin Shah. His son (from his first marriage to actress Neelima Azeem) is actor Shahid Kapoor.

== Early and personal life ==
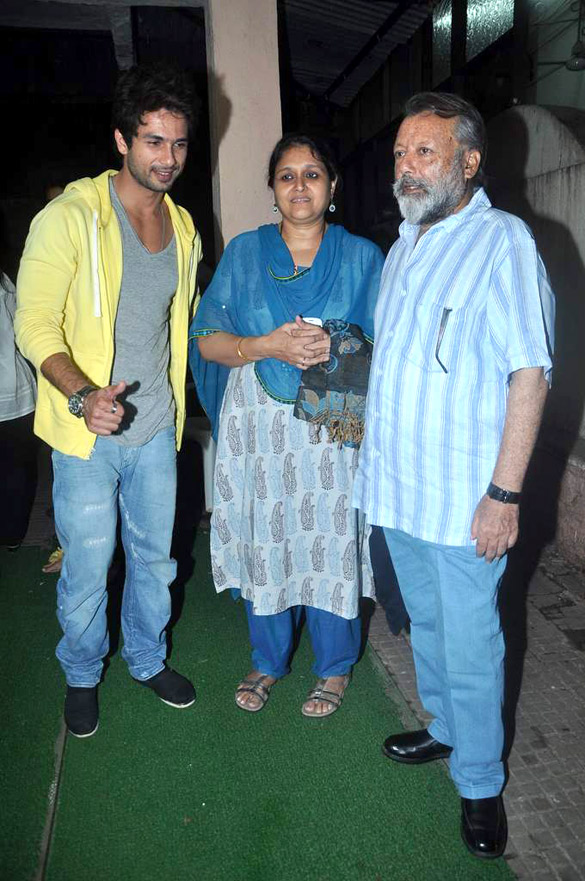
Shahid Kapoor, Supriya Pathak and Pankaj Kapur attend the screening of Teri Meri Kahaani

Pankaj Kapur was born on 29 May 1954 to a Hindu family in Ludhiana, Punjab. His family roots lie in pre-partition Hafizabad (now Punjab, Pakistan); his father was a writer and magazine editor established in Lahore and well-known in the local literary circles. He completed his education in Punjab and developed a keen interest in theatre and acting while growing up. He then enrolled in the National School of Drama to pursue his interest.

He married actress and dancer Neelima Azeem in 1979. They were settled in New Delhi where they had their only child Shahid Kapoor in 1981. The couple divorced in 1984.

Pankaj Kapur went on to marry actress Supriya Pathak in 1988. They have one daughter Sanah Kapur and a son Ruhaan Kapur. On 2 March 2022 Sanah married Mayank Pahwa whereas in September 2023 Ruhaan married Manukriti Pahwa both siblings being the children of actors Manoj Pahwa and Seema Bhargava Pahwa.

== Career ==
After graduating from the National School of Drama, he did theatre for the next four years until he was offered a role in Gandhi by Richard Attenborough. Over the years, as a director, he has done over 74 plays and serials, including Mohandas B.A.L.L.B., Wah Bhai Wah, Sahabji Biwiji Ghulamji and Drishtanth, Kanak Di Balli, Albert's Bridge and Panchvan Savaar.

He made his film debut with Shyam Benegal's film Arohan (1982). Following that he played Mahatma Gandhi's second secretary, Pyarelal Nayyar, in the Richard Attenborough film Gandhi in 1982. Later he dubbed for Ben Kingsley in the Hindi version of the film.

Thereafter he appeared in a string of art films that came under the parallel cinema category, with leading art films directors, starting with Shyam Benegal's Mandi (1983), Kundan Shah's comedy Jaane Bhi Do Yaaro again in 1983. This was followed by Saeed Akhtar Mirza satirical Mohan Joshi Hazir Ho! (1984), Mrinal Sen's Khandhar (1984), and Vidhu Vinod Chopra's suspense thriller Khamosh in 1985. He appeared in a number of art films, many of which went on to win National Film Awards.

In 1986, he switched to television, with the role of Karamchand jasoos(detective) in the detective-comedy, Karamchand, also starring Sushmita Mukherjee. Over the years he has been seen in numerous TV serials, including, Kab Tak Pukaroon (Doordarshan) Zabaan Sambhaal Ke (a remake of the English TV series, Mind Your Language), Lifeline with Vijaya Mehta, Neem ka Ped and finally comic interludes in Philips Top 10.

Meanwhile, his tryst with art cinema continued, as he starred in films like Chameli Ki Shaadi (1986), Ek Ruka Hua Faisla (1986), and Yeh Woh Manzil To Nahin (1987). In 1987, his comic side was visible again in the commercial action film Jalwa, also starring Naseeruddin Shah.

His first National Film Award came with the 1989 film, Raakh, which also starred Aamir Khan.

He starred in the classic Punjabi film Marhi Da Diva (1989). He featured in the 1992 Mani Ratnam film Roja directed. (Roja was made in Tamil and later dubbed in Hindi, Marathi, Telugu and Malayalam.)

His strongest performance in the early part of his career came from his lead role of struggling scientist in the film Ek Doctor Ki Maut (1991), for which he was awarded the 1991 National Film Award – Special Jury Award.

In 2000 he returned to television with the serial Office Office a satirical take on the prevalent corruption in India.

In 2003 he appeared in Maqbool, Vishal Bhardwaj's adaptation of Shakespeare's Macbeth. His antagonistic performance as the short-statured, potbellied, shuffle-footed Abbaji in Maqbool got him the 2004 National Film Award for Best Supporting Actor. Meanwhile, he released films like The Blue Umbrella (2005), Dus (2005) and Halla Bol (2008). In 2006, he started to be seen again on TV. In the TV series, Naya Office Office, a sequel to his previous series Office Office.

On 11 January 2013, the Vishal Bharadwaj-directed film Matru Ki Bijlee Ka Mandola, starring Kapur was released.

In November 2019, Kapur made his literature debut with his novella 'Dopehri', which he had written in 1992.

== Filmography ==
Year	Title	Role	Other notes
1981	Hari Hondal Bargadar : Share Cropper		
1981	Kahan Kahan Se Guzar Gaya		
1982	Gandhi	Pyarelal Nayyar	
1982	Aadharshila		
1983	Jaane Bhi Do Yaaro	Tarneja	
1983	Arohan		
1983	Mandi	Shanti Devi's Assistant	
1984	Khandhar	Dipu	
1984	Mohan Joshi Hazir Ho!		
1985	Khamosh	Kukku	
1985	Aitbaar	Advocate Jha	Uncredited
1985	Aghaat	Chotelal	
1986	Chameli Ki Shaadi	Kallumal "Koylawala"	
1986	Musafir	Shankeran Pillai	
1986	Ek Ruka Hua Faisla	Juror #3	
1987	Jalwa	Albert Pinto	
1987	Yeh Woh Manzil To Nahin	Rohit	
1987	Susman		
1988	Main Zinda Hoon		
1988	Ek Aadmi		
1988	Tamas	Thekedaar	Television Film
1989	Agla Mausam		
1989	Raakh	Inspector P.K	National Film Award for Best Supporting ActorNominated – Filmfare Award for Best Supporting Actor
1989	Marhi Da Deeva	Raunaki	Punjabi film
1989	Kamla Ki Maut	Sudhakar Patel	
1990	Ek Doctor Ki Maut	Dr. Dipankar Roy	National Film Award – Special Jury Award (feature film)
1990	Shadyantra	Sub-Inspector Tabrez Mohammad 'Tabbu' Khan	
1992	Roja	Liaqat	Tamil film
1993	Aakanksha	Ahmed	
1993	The Burning Season	Ashok Sarkar	
1994	Kokh		
1995	Ram Jaane	Pannu Technicolor	
1995	Daughters of this Century		
1997	Rui Ka Bojh		
2002	Jackpot Do Karode	Rana	
2003	Main Prem Ki Diwani Hoon	Satyaprakash	
2003	Maqbool	Jahangir Khan (Abbaji)	National Film Award for Best Supporting Actor Filmfare Award for Best Actor (Critics)
2005	Dus	Jamwal	Nominated – Filmfare Award for Best Performance in a Negative Role
2005	The Blue Umbrella	Nand Kishore	
2005	Sehar	Prof. Bhole Shankar Tiwari	
2007	Dharm	Pundit Chaturvedi	
2008	Halla Bol	Sidhu	
2009	Love Khichdi	Subramani in Dream Fantasy	
2010	Good Sharma	Hanuman	
2011	Chala Musaddi Office Office	Musaddi Lal Tripathi	
2013	Matru Ki Bijlee Ka Mandola	Harry Mandola	Nominated – Filmfare Award for Best Supporting Actor
2014	Finding Fanny	Don Pedro	English film
2015	Shaandaar	Bipin Arora	
2018	Toba Tek Singh	Toba Tek Singh	
2019	Happi	Happi	Delayed film Released on Zee5
2022	Jersey	Coach	
2023	Lost	Nanu	Zee5 film
2023	Bheed	Balram Trivedi	
2024	Binny And Family	SN Singh	
2025	Raavi De Kande	Chaman Lal	Punjabi film
2026	Jab Khuli Kitaab	Gopal Chandra Nautiyal	

=== Director ===
- Mausam (2011) Starring Shahid Kapoor, Sonam Kapoor, Jaspal Bhatti
- Mohandas B.A.L.L.B. (1998)

=== Writer ===
- Sau Jhooth Ek Sach (2005)

=== Television ===
- Karamchand (Season 1) (1985–1988)
- Mungerilal Ke Haseen Sapne (1989-1990)
- Zabaan Sambhalke (Season 1) (1993-1994) as Mohan Bharti
- Neem Ka Ped (1991) as Budhai Ram
- Phatichar (1991)
- Lifeline with Vijaya Mehta
- Zabaan Sambhalke (Season 2) (1997-1998) as Mohan Bharti
- Mohandas B.A.L.L.B. (1997-1998)
- Office Office (2000) as Musaddi Lal
- Bharat Ek Khoj
- Tehreer Munshi Premchand Ki – Godaan & Kafan on Doordarshan (2004)
- Kab Tak Pukaroon
- Naya Office Office (2006–2009)
- Karamchand (Season 2) (2007)
- JL50 (2020)
- IC 814: The Kandahar Hijack (2024)
- Thode Dur Thode Paas (2025)

== Dubbing roles ==
=== Live action films ===
Film title	Actor(s)	Character(s)	Dub language	Original language	Original Year release	Dub Year release	Notes
Gandhi	Ben Kingsley	Mahatma Gandhi	Hindi	English	1982	1982	Pankaj also played Mahatma Gandhiji's Assistant Pyarelal Nayyar in movie.

== Awards and nominations ==
Film awards
Year	Award	Category	Nominated work	Result
2005	IIFA Awards	Best Supporting Actor	Maqbool	Nominated
2006	IIFA Awards	Best Performance in a Negative Role	Dus	Nominated
1990	Filmfare Awards	Best Supporting Actor	Raakh	Nominated
2005	Filmfare Awards	Best Actor (Critics)	Maqbool	Won
2006	Filmfare Awards	Best Performance in a Negative Role	Dus	Nominated
2014	Filmfare Awards	Best Supporting Actor	Matru Ki Bijlee Ka Mandola	Nominated
1989	National Film Awards	Best Supporting Actor	Raakh	Won
1991	National Film Awards	Special Jury Award	Ek Doctor Ki Maut	Won
2004	National Film Awards	Best Supporting Actor	Maqbool	Won
2004	Producers Guild Film Awards	Best Actor in a Supporting Role	Maqbool	Won
2015	Producers Guild Film Awards	Best Actor in a Comic Role	Finding Fanny	Nominated
2006	Screen Awards	Best Supporting Actor	Maqbool	Nominated
2008	Screen Awards	Best Actor in a Negative Role	The Blue Umbrella	Won
2009	Screen Awards	Best Supporting Actor	Halla Bol	Nominated
2005	Zee Cine Awards	Best Actor (Critics)	Maqbool	Won
2005	Zee Cine Awards	Best Actor in a Supporting Role – Male	Maqbool	Nominated

Television awards
Year	Award	Category	Nominated work	Result
2021	Asian Television Awards	Best Actor in a Leading Role	JL50	Nominated
2003	Indian Television Academy Awards	Best Actor - Comedy	Office Office	Won
2004	Indian Television Academy Awards	Best Actor - Comedy	Office Office	Won
2007	Indian Television Academy Awards	Best Actor - Comedy	Office Office	Won
2002	Indian Telly Awards	Best Actor in a Comic Role	Office Office	Won
2003	Indian Telly Awards	Best Actor in a Comic Role	Office Office	Won
2004	Indian Telly Awards	Best Actor in a Comic Role	Office Office	Nominated
2006	Indian Telly Awards	Best Actor in a Comic Role	Office Office	Nominated
2007	Indian Telly Awards	Best Actor in a Comic Role	Office Office	Nominated
