= Thukra Ke Mera Pyaar =

- Genre: Drama
- Created by: Shraddha Pasi Jairath
- Directed by: Shraddha Pasi Jairath
- Starring: Dhaval Thakur; Sanchita Basu
- Country of origin: India
- Original language: Hindi
- No. of seasons: 2
- No. of episodes: 69

Production
- Producer: Bombay Show Studios

Original release
- Network: JioHotstar
- Release: 22 November 2024 – 4 September 2026

Thukra Ke Mera Pyaar is a Hindi drama series that premiered on JioHotstar on 22 November 2024. The series stars newcomers Dhaval Thakur and Sanchita Basu. The story revolves around two young lovers from different backgrounds and societal standards, whose love story is marred by family feuds rooted in caste and class differences. The series is directed by Shraddha Pasi Jairath and produced by Bombay Show Studios. It emerged as the most-watched show of the year on JioHotstar.

== Plot summary ==
Season 1

The story begins when Kuldeep, a bright but poor young man, crosses paths with Shanvika, the privileged daughter of the powerful Chauhan family. What starts as an unusual encounter gradually develops into love.

Their relationship, however, is strongly opposed because of caste and class differences. Shanvika's family considers Kuldeep unsuitable for her, and the conflict between the families becomes increasingly intense.

Things take a tragic turn when the opposition to their relationship escalates into violence, leaving Kuldeep's family devastated. Kuldeep is forced to rebuild his life, while Shanvika faces pressure from her family and is pushed toward another marriage.

Instead of giving up, Kuldeep focuses on his education and his ambitions, eventually entering public life and politics. His personal pain and the injustice he has experienced begin influencing the choices he makes.

The story then moves beyond a simple love triangle into a cycle of love, betrayal, revenge, family rivalry and political power. The characters' relationships become increasingly complicated as Kuldeep's conscience clashes with his political ambitions and Shanvika becomes determined to seek revenge.

Season 2

The second season raises the stakes considerably. Shanvika is dealing with the aftermath of her husband's death and becomes involved in a dangerous struggle for power. Kuldeep, meanwhile, is consumed by guilt and is caught between his past love, his conscience and politics.

Eventually, Kuldeep and Shanvika's paths cross again. Their old feelings and shared losses resurface, but they are now surrounded by political enemies, rival families and schemes for power. The central question becomes whether they can overcome their past and work toward justice—or whether their relationship will remain trapped in the cycle of revenge.

== Seasons ==
Season	Episodes	Originally released	
Season	Episodes	First released	Last released
1	19	22 November 2024	13 December 2024
2	50	19 June 2026	4 September 2026

== Episodes ==
Season 1 (22 November 2024-13 December 2024)

No. overall	No. of season	Title	Air date
1	1	Chauhano Ki Shaan	22 November 2024
Shanvika, arrogant daughter of the elite Chauhan family, encounters Kuldeep, a brilliant but poor young man, when her bicycle breaks down. An unexpected exchange ensues.
2	2	Humse Dosti Karoge?	22 November 2024
Nakul and his gang attempt to steal Kuldeep's new bicycle, leading to a confrontation. Shanvika intervenes, posing a question to Kuldeep.
3	3	Aapki Pehchan Hai Kya?	22 November 2024
Shanvika's determination to excel academically intensifies after Kuldeep rejects her proposal, igniting a fierce rivalry between the two students.
4	4	Namak Harami Mat Karna	22 November 2024
Shanvika's determination to rank first leads to unethical actions. When classmate Kuldeep goes missing, Inspector Dushyant Singh investigates her dubious "hard work.
5	5	Ishq Hua Hai!	22 November 2024
Shanvika and Kuldeep's romance faces turmoil when Pushkar and his men disrupt their blissful moment, igniting a clash between their families.
6	6	Galti Hamari Nahi Thi	22 November 2024
Shanvika's declaration leads to Kuldeep's family being humiliated in public. They flee for their lives after Pushkar sets fire to their house, but Simmi's tragic step shatters them.
7	7	Saaye Mein Dhoop	22 November 2024
Kuldeep, a rickshaw driver, finds inspiration from Prerna, an aspirant preparing for civil services exams, to pursue his dreams and aspire for a better future.
8	8	Namak Haram	29 November 2024
Family pressures Shanvika into marrying Dushyant reluctantly. Kuldeep focuses on studies but faces devastation after a fateful call.
9	9	Tu Hoga Kamyaab	29 November 2024
Shanvika's rejection of Dushyant on their wedding night sparks turmoil. Kuldeep grapples with inner conflicts as Prerna guides him to harness his anger constructively.
10	10	Chaman Mein Deedawar	29 November 2024
Kuldeep's life hangs in the balance as he faces his UPSC final interview and his mother's coma. The UPSC results bring a shocking revelation, especially those in Sitaarpur.
11	11	Mera Lakshya Kuch Aur Hai	29 November 2024
Kuldeep's political return sparks chaos when he proposes building a bridge in a Chauhan area. Daddu proposes an easy way for him to do it.
12	12	Astitwa ki Ladai	6 December 2024
Under Kuldeep's orders, boating activities cease, facilitating the bridge construction. His and Mala's wedding is marred by rising tensions when the Chauhans arrive.
13	13	Bhoot, Bhavishya, Vartaman	6 December 2024
Tensions rise as Dushyant's loyalty is questioned. Mala discusses plans with her spouse. The Chauhan family faces setbacks with business raids.
14	14	Woh Badla Lene Hi Aaya Hai	6 December 2024
Shanvika is warned by Dushyant of Kuldeep's desire for vengeance, yet she refuses to engage. Exasperated with Kuldeep's overbearing conduct, the Chauhans hire Gauri as an assassin.
15	15	Kuch Bachna Nahi Chahiye	6 December 2024
Gauri flees the police but is kidnapped. He pleads with Angad to rendezvous with the Chauhans' hideout while Kuldeep conducts a raid on their residence.
16	16	Ghar Ka Malik Bhag Chala	13 December 2024
The Chauhan brothers surrender amid public uproar. Behind bars, Manohar reflects on his choices. Kuldeep celebrates, bringing together Dushyant and Shanvika.
17	17	Ab Apna Rasta Badal Lo	13 December 2024
Dushyant considers resigning, but Kuldeep declines his resignation and proposes an alternative. Gendalal cautions Kuldeep about Daddu's conflicting intentions regarding Chauhan's prospective son-in-law.
18	18	Sab Kuch Khatam Ho Gaya	13 December 2024
Daddu orders SP Mishra to capture Pushkar, who escapes. Shanvika comforts a distressed Dushyant. Kuldeep reunites with his childhood friend Pintu, who offers guidance.
19	19	Ab Humari Baari	13 December 2024
Kuldeep uncovers the truth behind Shanvika's deception about their relationship. Another tragic incident befalls her, forcing Shanvika to rebuild her life.

Season 2 (19 June 2026-present)

No. overall	No. of season	Title	Air date
20	1	Naye Dushman ya Naye Dost?	19 June 2026
After performing her husband Dushyant's last rites, Shanvika faces an unexpected ambush on her journey home. Forced into a deadly gun fight, she must discover the identity of her mysterious new enemy in Sitaarpur.
21	2	Kunwar ki Ummid, Shanvika ki Chaal	19 June 2026
Kuldeep drowns in guilt over Shanvika while Mala and Daddu struggle to reach him. As tensions escalate and danger closes in, Shanvika must make a calculated decision that could change everything.
22	3	Bas Ek Mulakaat	19 June 2026
Tensions escalate in Sitaarpur as Shanvika faces relentless attacks. While steeling herself for the conflicts to come, an unexpected truth emerges that threatens to shatter everything she believed in.
23	4	Kuldeep ka Prayashchit	19 June 2026
Angad becomes ensnared in Shanvika's calculated trap. Kuldeep's mounting remorse pushes him toward a dangerous decision. As political machinations intensify, Shanvika finally consents to a meeting with Kuldeep.
24	5	Pyaar ka Nostalgia	26 June 2026
Shanvika confronts Kuldeep with a gun, but her pain outweighs her rage. They share their losses, and Kuldeep agrees to join her perilous mission for justice.
25	6	Pushkar ki Jaan ko Khatra hai	26 June 2026
Pushkar is in danger at the hospital when chaos breaks out, but Shanvika saves him. Meanwhile, Angad shoots a corrupt doctor, not knowing he's being watched.
26	7	Raajneeti par Pyaar Bhaari	26 June 2026
Kunwar pledges support to Shanvika but becomes enraged about Pushkar's vanishing, suspecting Daddu. Shanvika and Kuldeep argue after she confesses to ordering Dr Vinay's killing.
27	8	Shanvika ka Naya Rakshak	26 June 2026
Shanvika faces an ambush but a masked shooter rescues her, leaving Daddu rattled. Daddu, now suspicious, tells Singh to bring Mala home and monitor Kuldeep closely.
28	9	Transfer yaa Saazish?	3 July 2026
Mala, obsessed with Kuldeep, rejects Daddu's plan to kill him and vows to destroy Shanvika. Daddu then reveals Kuldeep's surprise transfer order, leaving Kuldeep stunned.
29	10	Nani ki Seekh, Pyaar ki Jeet	3 July 2026
Daddu celebrates his political victory and schemes to kill Shanvika following Kuldeep's transfer. A vivid flashback motivates Kuldeep to act, shocking Daddu.
30	11	Imaandari ka Sabut	3 July 2026
Saadhu and Kundan's crime sets off a chain reaction in Sitaarpur. Shanvika uses the chaos to her benefit, allowing Kunwar to take credit.
31	12	Varchasva ki Ladai!	3 July 2026
Poornima's death triggers total war when Daddu Prasad orders Kunwar's family destroyed. Meanwhile, Shanvika and Pushkar plot in secret to seize power.
32	13	Deewaron Ke Bhi Aakhein Hoti Hain	10 July 2026
Unaware of looming threats, Prerna and Pushkar connect deeply. Police slayings spark widespread alarm as Daddu manipulates Angad to capture Shanvika, though Kuldeep thwarts him.
33	14	Kaptaan Mara Gaya!	10 July 2026
As Angad is hidden for safety, Kuldeep manipulates Daddu's suspicions. Daddu orders Saadhu and Kundan to eliminate Shanvika or face severe consequences.
34	15	2 Prime Suspects!	10 July 2026
Public pressure over a senior officer's death leads the Chief Minister to assign the case to the Intelligence Agency. Two individuals, Shanvika and Kuldeep, become primary suspects in the investigation.
35	16	Gheera!	10 July 2026
Constable Divya's investigation reveals SP Mishra's misconduct. Suspicion falls on Kuldeep when Pradeep vanishes, but Pradeep is later found and detained for his secret activities.
36	17	Baazi Palat Gayi!	17 July 2026
During an intelligence investigation, Angad testifies how Daddu Prasad orchestrated crimes to maintain control. Shanvika rises as a powerful leader in Sitaarpur's political arena.
37	18	Alert!	17 July 2026
Authorities expose Daddu Prasad's corruption scheme and arrest him following public outcry. As Kuldeep and Shanvika celebrate their success together, Pintu mysteriously disappears.
38	19	Uttaradhikari Mil Gaya!	17 July 2026
After a child's abduction troubles Kuldeep, the town is locked down and suspects detained. As Daddu plans his return, Mala's quest for justice is revealed.
39	20	Satta Ka Safar!	17 July 2026
Kuldeep realizes Pintu's death was meant to destroy him. He encourages Shanvika to enter politics. She demonstrates leadership by securing a business deal. Kunwar promises her a ministerial position.
40	21	Siyasi Zameen	24 July 2026
Kunwar proposes Shanvika for a key position, changing political dynamics. Kuldeep mentors Shanvika, rekindling past emotions and causing Mala's unease.
41	22	Ticket Mil Gaya	24 July 2026
Shanvika's political ascent alarms Daddu and Kunwar. The Chauhan Mansion celebrates her ticket announcement as masked assailants kidnap Kuldeep's family.
42	23	Maut ka Badla Maut!	24 July 2026
Ranjan's death prompts Chatki to pursue vengeance against Kunwar. Daddu Prasad reenters politics after being released on bail, intensifying the situation for everyone involved.
43	24	Shaam 5:00 Baje	24 July 2026
A coded message helps Kuldeep escape, revealing a conspiracy tied to Ramlal's group. Shanvika's campaign wins decisively, defeating Daddu by a large margin.
44	25	Result!	24 July 2026
Shanvika celebrates her political win while Kuldeep mourns his father Gendalal's tragic death. Consumed by grief and anger, Kuldeep confronts Daddu violently, leading to his arrest and imprisonment.
45	26	Badalte Raste!	31 July 2026
Mala admits to her father she plotted to kill Kuldeep's father. Daddu Prasad's testimony leads to Kuldeep's reinstatement as DM. Shanvika takes on her new ministerial position.
46	27	Samuhik Vivah!	31 July 2026
Bansal operates a human trafficking ring disguised as a mass marriage program. Kuldeep discovers Pushkar has been released. Pushkar returns to Sitaarpur and violently reasserts his authority.
47	28	Sangathan!	31 July 2026
Kuldeep demands harsh measures against illegal weapons following Pushkar's return. He orders Daddu and Rantej to join forces with Bansal and Rathod. The fight for Sitaarpur intensifies dangerously.
48	29	Aslaah	31 July 2026
Kuldeep escalates his campaign against Pushkar with strict enforcement on illegal weapons. Meanwhile, Pushkar meets with Bansal to assess their criminal operations.
49	30	Pyar Nahi toh Dosti hi Sahi	7 August 2026
Kuldeep is acquitted and resolves to confront the Chauhan family. As Pushkar and Prerna's relationship deepens, Kuldeep and Mala decide to start their connection as friends.
50	31	Tender	7 August 2026
In Sitaarpur, a massive government contract sparks cutthroat competition. Pushkar's marriage catches everyone off guard, exposing covert partnerships and dangerous plots.
51	32	Humein Chinta hai Tumhari	7 August 2026
A canceled contract deepens tensions between Shanvika and Kuldeep. Pushkar creates a public controversy, escalating political divisions in Sitaarpur.
52	33	Samuhik Vivah ka Sach	7 August 2026
A mass wedding event reveals a criminal network. Detective Kuldeep's investigation uncovers corruption involving powerful figures and Shanvika, leading to a dangerous pursuit of justice.
53	34	Sach ki Talaash aur Satta ki Jung	14 August 2026
Set on uncovering the mass marriage scandal, Kuldeep gets attacked. Shanvika focuses on strengthening her public image. Kuldeep faces a tense confrontation with MLA Trilochan.
54	35	Badla ya Usool!	14 August 2026
Shanvika's political empire is at stake. Bansal and Rathore worry about getting exposed. Kuldeep begins the hunt for the truth and shakes the foundations of Sitaarpur's politics.
55	36	Saboot Nikalo	14 August 2026
Shanvika's family fears for their political reputation when Kuldeep presents evidence of the conspiracy. Bansal and Rathore attempt to destroy it, but Kuldeep pledges to reveal those responsible.
56	37	Mala aur Do Kaand!	14 August 2026
Preeti uncovers a major secret involving Mala and Sadhu, but this puts her life in danger. While Daddu begins to suspect Kuldeep, Shanvika's enemies continue to plot against her.
57	38	Mastermind!	21 August 2026
Sitaarpur's mass wedding fraud is exposed, implicating Home Minister Vishal Tikariya. Mala becomes a suspect in two murders while Preeti faces danger.
58	39	Personal Ambition	21 August 2026
Prerna allies with Rantej to challenge Shanvika's political campaign. As Pushkar grows suspicious of internal betrayal, an anonymous source threatens to reveal their scheme.
59	40	Bohut Hua Natak!	21 August 2026
Kuldeep refuses to falsely accuse Shanvika despite their conflict, choosing honorable confrontation. As he ends his arranged marriage with Mala, Shanvika worries about his wellbeing.
60	41	Guest Room	21 August 2026
Mala confronts Kuldeep about their marriage. As tensions rise, Kuldeep moves to the guest room while Preeti encourages him to address the situation.
61	42	Charitra Hanan	28 August 2026
Rumors about Kuldeep and Shanvika threaten her reputation and family honor. Suspecting Daddu's involvement, she confronts the situation while Kuldeep tries to avoid Mala's schemes.
62	43	Confession	28 August 2026
Sadhu's testimony reveals Mala's involvement in two deaths. As ambition, vengeance and deception intersect, the evidence serves an unexpected purpose.
63	44	Divorce	28 August 2026
Sitaarpur opens its first cancer hospital as Mala finalizes her divorce. Kuldeep questions her motives, but a dangerous encounter transforms their situation.
64	45	Naya Daavedaar	28 August 2026
65	46		04 September 2026
66	47		04 September 2026
67	48		04 September 2026
68	49		04 September 2026
69	50		04 September 2026

== Cast and characters ==
- Dhaval Thakur as Kuldeep Kumar (S1 E1-present)
- Sanchita Basu as Shanvika Chauhan (S1 E1-present)
- Aniruddh Dave as Dushyant Singh
- Palak Jain as Mala Prasad (S1 E13-present)
- Govind Pandey
- Sushil Pandey as Gendalal (S1 E1-S2 E25)
- Mahesh Chandra Deva as Inspector Chobey
- Neeta Satnani as Lady Doctor

== Critical reception ==
Grace Cyril of Times Now rated the film 2 stars, stating, "While the storyline might have failed to impress us, the actors are the ones who save Thukra Ke Mera Pyaar from being a total dud."

Archika Khurana of Times of India also rated the series 2.0 stars, commenting, "In conclusion, Thukra Ke Mera Pyaar fails to live up to its potential. The predictable plot and underdeveloped themes hold it back, despite decent performances from the lead actors."

Amit Bhatia of ABP News criticized the series, saying, "The story is so stale that it becomes useless to talk about other things. Overall, this series is revenge on you, do not take it from anyone."
