= Nayeem =

Naxal leader and alleged criminal

- Nayeem meeting with his Police handler (R) in 2000
- Born: Bhongir
- Died: 8 August 2016; Shadnagar
- Cause of death: police Encounter
- Years active: 1980 to 2016
- Spouse: Hassena Begum
- Children: 3
- Criminal charges: Kidnapping, arms trafficking, child abuse, targeted killing, extortion

Details
- Weapon: AK-47

Nayeem or Mohammed Nayeemuddin (died 8 August 2016), was a former naxal leader and alleged criminal. He first gained prominence in 1993 due to his alleged involvement killing of Indian Police Service officer K. S. Vyas. He and his brother played an important role in killing Belli Lalitha in 1999. He was a resident of Bhongir located in Nalgonda district on the border of Hyderabad.

Nayeem was a leader of a Maoist squad which was previously known as "naxalites of People's War" before turning himself in and later cooperating with authorities. Civil rights activists claim that after his surrender, Nayeem served as an informer to the police and helped in the elimination of other naxalites while the Police deny this claim.

Nayeem died in a police encounter in August 2016.

Chief minister of Telangana, K. Chandrasekhar Rao informed the Telangana Legislative Assembly in December 2016 that, after the death of Nayeemuddin, police arrested 124, registered 174 cases, and seized weapons and properties worth over ₹100 crore (equivalent to ₹157 crore or US$16 million in 2026). Rao further added Nayeem's gang was involved in 27 murder cases and its involvement was suspected in another 25 murder cases.
