= Palak Jain (actress, active since 2019) =

Indian actress

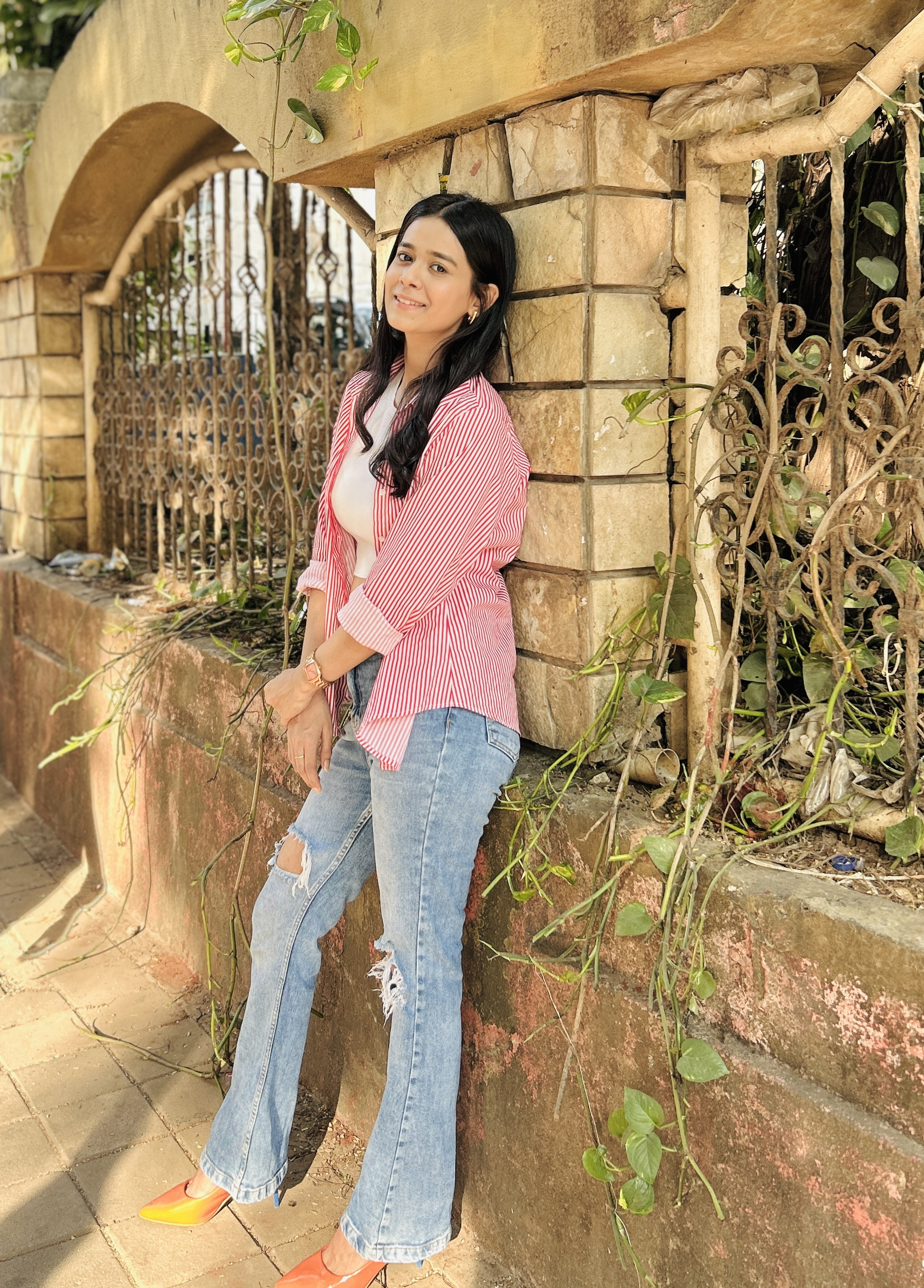
- Jain in 2024
- Born: July 27, 1998 (age 28)
- Citizenship: Indian
- Occupation: Actress
- Years active: 2019 - Present
- Known for: Thukra Ke Mera Pyaar

Palak Jain is an Indian actress who works in films and television. She made her television debut in 2019 by playing role of Alisha Jindal in Guddan Tumse Na Ho Payega, In 2021 she portrayed Richa in the show Teri Laadli Main and also portrayed Esha Mishra in Jagannath Aur Purvi Ki Dosti Anokhi. She has worked in films like Patna Shuklla.

== Filmography ==
=== Television ===
| Year | Title | Role | Notes | Ref. |
|---|---|---|---|---|
| 2019 - 2020 | Guddan Tumse Na Ho Payega | Alisha Jindal | | |
| 2021 | Teri Laadli Main | Richa | | |
| 2021 - 2023 | Pyaar Tune Kya Kiya | Renne Fernandes/Jaya (lead) | Season 10 and 13 | |
| 2022 | Jagannath Aur Purvi Ki Dosti Anokhi | Esha Mishra | | |
| 2023 | Junooniyatt | Seerat Dosanjh | | |
| 2024 | Thukra Ke Mera Pyaar | Mala Prasad | Parallel Lead | |

=== Films ===
| Year | Title | Role | Ref. |
|---|---|---|---|
| 2024 | Patna Shuklla | Meghna Shrivastav | |
