= Khoya Khoya Chand =

- Movie poster
- Directed by: Sudhir Mishra
- Written by: Sudhir Mishra
- Produced by: Prakash Jha
- Starring: Shiney Ahuja; Soha Ali Khan; Rajat Kapoor; Sushmita Mukherjee
- Cinematography: Sachin K. Krishn
- Edited by: Ruchi Narain; Archit D. Rastoga
- Music by: Shantanu Moitra
- Production company: Prakash Jha Productions
- Distributed by: Holy Cow Pictures; Adlabs
- Release date: 7 December 2007
- Running time: 131 minutes
- Country: India
- Language: Hindi

Khoya Khoya Chand, (translation: Lost Moon) is a 2007 Indian Hindi-language romantic drama film directed by Sudhir Mishra and produced by Prakash Jha. The film stars Shiney Ahuja and Soha Ali Khan with Rajat Kapoor, Sushmita Mukherjee, Sonya Jehan and Vinay Pathak in supporting roles. The film captures the lifestyle of celebrities with aplomb with the 1950s film industry as its backdrop. It was released on 7 December 2007.

== Synopsis ==
Zafar, a young and rebellious writer, comes to Mumbai to try his luck in the Bollywood film industry. He soon falls in love with a starlet and loses himself in the intoxicating world of glamour.

== Cast ==
- Shiney Ahuja as Zafar
- Soha Ali Khan as Nikhat
- Rajat Kapoor as Prem Kumar
- Vinay Pathak as Shaymol Mukherjee
- Saurabh Shukla as Producer Khosa
- Sonya Jehan as Ratanbala
- Sushmita Mukherjee as Sharda
- Mahie Gill as Starlet at Prem's house
- Haidar Ali as Michael
- Ashish Ghosh as Noni Ganguly
- Alka Pradhan as Nikhat's mother

== Music ==
The soundtrack of the film was released on 8 November 2007; composed by Shantanu Moitra, with lyrics by Swanand Kirkire.

Khoya Khoya Chand

Soundtrack album by Shantanu Moitra
- Released: 8 November 2007 (India)
- Genre: Film soundtrack
- Label: Adlabs Presents

Shantanu Moitra chronology
Laaga Chunari Mein Daag (2007)	Khoya Khoya Chand (2007)

Song	Singer(s)
"Chale Aao Saiyan"	Shreya Ghoshal
"Khoya Khoya Chand"	Ajay Jhingran & Swanand Kirkire
"Khushboo Sa"	Hamsika Iyer
"O Re Paakhi"	Sonu Nigam
"Sakhi Piya"	Pranab Biswas & Shreya Ghoshal
"Thirak Thirak"	Sonu Nigam & Shreya Ghoshal
"Yeh Nigahein"	Sonu Nigam & Antara Chowdhury

== Reception ==
Khalid Mohamed of Hindustan Times gave the film 2.5 out of 5 stars, writing ″Like it or not, Soha Ali Khan is hopelessly miscast.The role required at least one per cent of what Smita Patil gave to Bhumika. Ms Khan may be sincere but not mature enough to make you care about this Soya Soya Chand.″ Taran Adarsh of IndiaFM gave the film 1.5 stars out of 5, writing ″On the whole, the film has some interesting moments, but the impact it ought to create as also its slow pacing and excessive length dilute the effect.″
