= Patna Shuklla =

2024 Indian legal drama film

- Official release poster
- Directed by: Vivek Budakoti
- Written by: Vivek Budakoti, Sameer Arora, Farid Khan
- Produced by: Arbaaz Khan
- Starring: Raveena Tandon; Manav Vij; Chandan Roy Sanyal; Satish Kaushik
- Cinematography: Neha Parti Matiyani
- Edited by: Vini N Raj
- Music by: Karan Kulkarni
- Production companies: Zeal Z Entertainment Services; Arbaaz Khan Productions
- Distributed by: Disney+ Hotstar
- Release date: 29 March 2024
- Running time: 125 Minutes
- Country: India
- Language: Hindi

Patna Shuklla is a 2024 Indian Hindi-language legal drama film directed by Vivek Budakoti and produced by Arbaaz Khan for Disney+ Hotstar. It stars Raveena Tandon, Manav Vij, Chandan Roy Sanyal, Satish Kaushik, Anushka Kaushik, Jatin Goswami and others. The film was released on 29 March 2024 to negative reviews from critics.

== Cast ==
- Raveena Tandon as Tanvi Shukla
- Manav Vij as Siddharth Shukla
- Chandan Roy Sanyal as Neelkanth Misra
- Satish Kaushik as Judge Arun Kumar Jha
- Arijeet Kaurav as Sonu
- Raju Kher as J P Sharma, Tanvi's father
- Anushka Kaushik as Rinki Kumari
- Ambrish Kumar Shukla as Matadin, Rinki's father
- Jatin Goswami as Raghubir Singh
- Alok Chatterjee as Daanveer Singh
- Sushmita Mukherjee as Lata Jha, Arun Jha's wife
- Daya Shankar Pandey as Surendra Mohan
- Rio Kapadia as Harsh Sinha
- Indra Kumar as Income Tax officer
- Rajshree Thakkar as Mahua
- Palak Jain as Meghna Shrivastav

== Production ==
The film was announced in September 2022. Principal photography commenced on 16 November 2022. Filming wrapped on 23 November 2022.

=== Casting ===
Raveena Tandon plays the lead role and she finished her shooting on 23 December 2022. Chandan Roy Sanyal was finalised for the role of a lawyer. Satish Kaushik played the role of the Judge. Anushka Kaushik also joined the film with a pivotal role.

== Release ==
The film was premiered on 29 March 2024 on Disney+ Hotstar.

== Reception ==
It received negative reviews from the critics.

Giving a poor 1.5 star out of 5 Saibal Chatterjee of NDTV opined "The title isn't the only thing that is baffling about this film. The choice of Bhopal as filming location for a story set in Patna is strange, to say the least." Shubhra Gupta of The Indian Express opined "A climactic rigmarole mars it, but Patna Shuklla is still one of those you can watch simply because you want to see good women win."

Monika Rawal Kukreja for Hindustan Times wrote "At two hours 13 minutes, the film appears a tad stretched in the second half and could have gone for a crisper editing, especially in the scenes outside the court." Ronak Kotecha of The Times of India rated the film 3.5 stars out of 5 and wrote "Despite a slow pace, Raveena’s flawless act keeps the viewer interest alive. Manav Vij is well-suited to play Siddharth, a man who has to strike a balance between his wife’s unwavering stand for what’s right and what is practically possible in a small town."

Sana Farzeen for India Today gave 2.5 stars out 5 and stated "Bankrolled by Arbaaz Khan, the film gives Raveena Tandon a great platform to perform, something that the actor rightfully deserves." Rohit Bhatnagar of The Free Press Journal praised Raveena Tandon's performance and stated "Raveena Tandon is the lifeline of Patna Shuklla. She rides the entire film on her own shoulders quite well."

Pushpangi Raina of Outlook India wrote "The movie doesn’t have abrupt cuts; however, there are a few seconds of black screens here and there, but those can be easily ignored." Sukanya Verma of Rediff.com gave poor 2 stars out of 5 and stated "Patna Shuklla's dull drama struggles to leave any impact as it goes about randomly introducing skeletons in everyone’s closet as its quick fix solution to anything."

Gautaman Bhaskaran of News18 felt the film "strongly resembles Jolly LLB". He further stated "The movie itself has many facets that run parallel to Jolly LLB. Judge Jha (late Satish Kaushik) in Patna Shuklla looks very similar to Judge Tripathi (Saurabh Shukla)." Shreyas Pande of Cinema Express also found the film similar to Jolly LLB movie and stated "The judges in Patna Shuklla and Jolly LLB are almost identical, and even the back-and-forth between the lawyers and judges in both films are similar."

Likewise others, Bollywood Hungama reviewer also stated "The comical side of the judge instantly reminds one of the Jolly LLB series. It also looks forced. Some of the arguments placed by Tanvi seemed weak and it didn’t look convincing." Reviewing for The Week Suparna Sharma commented "What’s worse is that the film can’t stay and applaud Tanvi in her big moment of victory."

Pratikshya Mishra of The Quint stated "The flaws in Patna Shuklla are evident but the film has enough going for it to merit a watch." Nandini Ramnath of Scroll.in praised Raveena's performance and opined "The old-fashioned emphasis on moral probity leans a bit too heavily in favour of its crusading heroine. Tanvi’s courtroom tactics and legal acrobatics often bring her intelligence into question."

Rishil Jogani of Pinkvilla wrote "Patna Shuklla is a well made legal drama with a very interesting twist in the last 20 odd minutes of the film." A critic from Telangana Today stated "There are also issues of gender discrimination faced by women. Despite occasional flaws, it goes maintains a steady flow with an engaging narrative, comedy timing, and one-liners."
