= Kabeer Kaushik =

Indian film director and screenwriter

- Born: Patna, Bihar, India
- Occupation: Film director
- Years active: 2005–2012

Kabeer Kaushik is an Indian film director and screenwriter. Born and brought up in a Bihari family in Patna and graduated from Frank Anthony Public School in New Delhi. He debuted with Sehar in 2005.

== Filmography ==
Year	Film	Role
2005	Sehar	Written and directed by
2008	Chamku	Written and directed by
2010	Hum Tum Aur Ghost	Directed by
2012	Maximum	Written and directed by
