= Thode Door Thode Paas =

- Promotional poster
- Genre: Family drama
- Created by: Shiirshak S. Anand
- Written by: Shiirshak S. Anand
- Directed by: Ajay Bhuyan
- Starring: Pankaj Kapur; Mona Singh; Kunaal Roy Kapur
- Music by: Malla Siddharth
- Country of origin: India
- Original language: Hindi
- No. of seasons: 1
- No. of episodes: 5

Production
- Producers: Guneet Dogra; Nailesh Gada; Shailesh Sanghvi; Manish Trehan
- Cinematography: Sriram Ganapathy
- Editor: Adeeth Bhardwaj
- Production company: S3 Films

Original release
- Network: ZEE5
- Release: November 7, 2025

Thode Door Thode Paas is a 2025 Indian Hindi-language family drama web series. Created by Shiirshak S. Anand and directed by Ajay Bhuyan, the series stars Pankaj Kapur, Mona Singh, and Kunaal Roy Kapur in lead roles. It premiered on 7 November 2025 on ZEE5. The story follows the Mehta family, whose patriarch challenges his family to undertake a six-month digital detox in exchange for a reward of ₹1 crore.

== Premise ==
The story follows Ashwin Mehta, a retired naval officer who realizes that his family's growing dependence on digital devices has weakened their personal relationships. To restore balance, he challenges the entire family to give up their phones, laptops, and social media for six months. If they succeed, they will receive a monetary reward of ₹1 crore. The series explores how this "digital detox" affects the family's communication, emotions, and togetherness.

== Cast ==
- Pankaj Kapur as Ashwin Mehta
- Mona Singh as Simran Mehta
- Kunaal Roy Kapur as Kunal Mehta
- Ayesha Kaduskar as Avnii Mehta
- Leah Khambata as Sona
- Gurpreet Saini as Kumud Mehta
- Sartaj Kakkar as Vivaaaan Mehra
- Mayur More as Raunak

== Episodes ==
| No. | Title | Directed by | Written by | Original release date |
|---|---|---|---|---|
| 1 | "Dooriyan" | Ajay Bhuyan | Shiirshak S. Anand | 7 November 2025 |
Kunal and Simran struggle to juggle work and family life while their children, Avni and Vivaan, remain absorbed in their devices. When family patriarch Ashwin returns from a trip, he announces a drastic change for the household.
| 2 | "Zindagi Offline" | Ajay Bhuyan | Shiirshak S. Anand | 7 November 2025 |
Ashwin proposes a six-month gadget-free challenge, promising ₹1 crore to each family member who completes it. The Mehtas reluctantly accept the terms, but the new rules soon create tension, particularly between Kunal and Vivaan.
| 3 | "Retro Duniya" | Ajay Bhuyan | Shiirshak S. Anand | 7 November 2025 |
Still adjusting to life without phones and Wi-Fi, the Mehtas find themselves in awkward situations at home and outside. As they slowly adapt to the detox, Ashwin brings home a VCR so the family can share an old-school movie night together.
| 4 | "Door Ya Paas" | Ajay Bhuyan | Shiirshak S. Anand | 7 November 2025 |
The tech-free routine begins to reshape relationships within the family. Long-suppressed feelings surface between Kunal and Simran, while Ashwin and Avni grow closer through a shared creative project.
| 5 | "Reconnection" | Ajay Bhuyan | Shiirshak S. Anand | 7 November 2025 |
A sudden crisis forces the Mehtas to confront their fears about the detox and their own choices. As past wounds and hidden truths come out, the digital challenge turns into an opportunity for the family to emotionally reconnect.

== Production ==
The series is created by Shiirshak S. Anand and directed by Ajay Bhuyan. Cinematography is handled by Sriram Ganapathy, with editing by Adeeth Bhardwaj. It is produced by Manish Trehan, Shailesh Sanghvi, Jheel Sanghvi, and Aangi Sanghvi under the ZEE5 banner.

== Release ==
Thode Door Thode Paas released on 7 November 2025 on ZEE5.

== Reception ==
Sreeparna Sengupta of The Times of India rated the series 3.5/5, describing it as "a heart-warming, feel-good story buoyed by a delightful Pankaj Kapur." She appreciated its optimism and humour but felt that some of its resolutions were a little too neat. Writing for India Today, Sana Farzeen also awarded 3.5 stars, calling the show "warm and refreshing." She noted that the premise might have worked even better as a shorter film but commended its gentle tone and the chemistry among the cast. Udita Jhunjhunwala of Scroll.in observed that the series "digital-detox experiment leads to analogue joy," and admired its restrained storytelling and thoughtful performances.

Aishwarya Vasudevan of OTTplay gave it 3 out of 5, calling it "a quick, charming watch" that delivers its "disconnect-to-reconnect" message without becoming preachy. In Rediff.com, Deepa Gahlot described the show as "a pleasant watch" held together by Kapur's effortless screen presence, though she found the setup of the digital challenge slightly contrived. Firstpost rated it 2.5 stars, acknowledging the sincerity of its cast but observing that the show's conflicts resolve too quickly and that the narrative "feels hushed and hurried."

According to Times Now News, the show's "digital fasting funda" gently reminds viewers to "disconnect to reconnect." Troy Ribeiro of The Free Press Journal rated it 3.5 out of 5, calling it "a wholesome, witty and warm reminder that connection begins where Wi-Fi ends." Rediff TV described it as "a pleasant watch," echoing the praise for its warmth and sincerity.
