= Chamku =

2008 Indian film by Kabeer Kaushik

- Promotional film poster
- Directed by: Kabeer Kaushik
- Written by: Kabeer Kaushik
- Produced by: Dharmendra
- Starring: Bobby Deol; Priyanka Chopra; Irrfan Khan; Riteish Deshmukh; Danny Denzongpa
- Cinematography: Gopal Shah
- Edited by: Sanjay Sankla
- Music by: Monty Sharma
- Production company: Vijayta Films
- Distributed by: Zee Motion Pictures
- Release date: 29 August 2008
- Running time: 105 minutes
- Country: India
- Language: Hindi
- Budget: ₹10 crore
- Box office: ₹3.09 crore

Chamku is a 2008 Indian action thriller film written and directed by Kabeer Kaushik. It stars Bobby Deol in the eponymous role along with Priyanka Chopra. It also stars Irrfan Khan, Riteish Deshmukh and Danny Denzongpa in supporting roles. The film was released worldwide on 29 August 2008.

== Plot ==
The film tells the story of Chandrama Singh, who was raised by Baba, a Naxal leader based in the southern interior of Bihar, after his family was brutally murdered. He later gets picked up under a covert government program jointly conceived by RAW and the Intelligence Bureau to carry out political assassinations. He falls in love with Shubhi, a kindergarten teacher, and decides to lead a reformed life, but a chance encounter entangles him in the world of crime once again.

== Cast ==
- Bobby Deol as Chandrama "Chamku" Singh
- Priyanka Chopra as Shurbhi Gupta
- Irrfan Khan as Vishal Kapoor
- Ritesh Deshmukh as Arjun Tiwari
- Danny Denzongpa as Baba
- Rajpal Yadav as Hussain Ahmed
- Arya Babbar as Shreedhar
- Akhilendra Mishra as Thakur Mahendra Pratap Singh
- Rachna Khanna as Subhi Friend

== Production ==
Kabeer Kaushik, the director of the film had approached Bobby Deol to play the lead role in his debut film, Sehar, which was eventually played by Arshad Warsi. Despite liking the script Deol turned it down because he was not prepared to work with a debutant director and also felt that the plot was similar to some other film. The song "Gola Gola" from the film picturised on the festival of Holi was released exclusively on radio stations on 21 March 2008, to coincide with the festival of Holi. Rosa Catalano features in a dance number in the film titled Trance.

== Soundtrack ==
Monty Sharma has composed the soundtrack for the movie, and the lyrics have been written by Sameer. The soundtrack was released on 29 July 2008 under the label of T-Series.

Chamku

Soundtrack album by Monty Sharma
- Released: 29 July 2008
- Recorded: 2008
- Genre: Soundtrack
- Length: 29:38
- Label: T-Series
- Producer: Monty Sharma

Monty Sharma chronology
Heroes (2008)	Chamku (2008)	Naughty @ 40 (2008)

Track list
No.	Title	Singer(s)	Length
1.	"Aaja Milke"	Shreya Ghoshal, Shail Hada	5:29
2.	"Kithe Jawan"	Richa Sharma	5:50
3.	"Gola Gola"	Abhijeet Bhattacharya, Vaishali Samant	3:49
4.	"Trance"	Saleem Shahzada, Sowmya Raoh, Anaida	6:36
5.	"Bin Daseyaa"	Richa Sharma	4:26
6.	"Dukh Ke Badri"	Kalpana Patowary, Parthiv Gohil, Shail Hada	3:28
Total length:			29:38

== Reception ==
Taran Adarsh of IndiaFM gave the film 1.5 stars out of 5, writing, ″On the whole, CHAMKU rests on an outdated plot and given the blood-gore-brutality in the film, will face an uphill task. Businesswise, it has some chances in the U.P.-Bihar region.″ Sukanya Verma of Rediff.com gave the film 1 star out of 5, writing, ″director Kabeer Kaushik disappoints big time. It seems like Sehar and Chamku were directed by two different entities. His work here is utterly amateurish and rushed-up. The screenplay is shoddy whereas the dialogues are an excuse for mandatory exchange (which by the way are so sluggish in temperament they scream for a pair of scissors).″ Gaurav Malani of The Economic Times gave the film 1 star out of 5, writing, ″Bobby Deol carries the same jaded expression throughout the film. For Riteish Deshmukh, its clearly one of those films that you do as a favour for industry friends. Priyanka Chopra substantiates how worthless heroines are to male-centric cinema. Irrfan Khan shows more screen presence in his 20-second Vodafone commercials. Arya Babbar is relegated to the rank of a junior artist. Danny dies before you notice him. Alas, Chamku fails to shine. Rather it bears the blemish of an outdated 70s revenge drama."
