= Yeh Woh Manzil To Nahin =

- Directed by: Sudhir Mishra
- Written by: Sudhir Mishra
- Produced by: Sudhir Mishra
- Starring: Manohar Singh; Habib Tanvir; B. M. Shah; Pankaj Kapur; Sushmita Mukherjee; Naseeruddin Shah
- Cinematography: Devlin Bose
- Edited by: Renu Saluja
- Music by: Rajat Dholakia
- Release date: January 1987 (New Delhi)
- Running time: 132 minutes
- Country: India
- Language: Hindi

Yeh Woh Manzil To Nahin (English: This Is Not Our Destination) is a 1987 Hindi drama film written and directed by Sudhir Mishra, in a directorial debut. It starred Manohar Singh, Habib Tanvir, B. M. Shah, Pankaj Kapur, Sushmita Mukherjee and Naseeruddin Shah in key roles.

At the 34th National Film Awards, the film won the award for Best Debut Film of a Director.

== Plot ==
Three old men, who used to be close friends during their school days, embarked on a train journey from Bombay to Rajpur to attend the centenary celebration of their boarding school. As they travel, memories of their student activism and past failures flood their minds. Upon reaching their destination, they are confronted by political skirmishes that serve as a stark reminder of the occasions when they had failed to stay true to their conscience.

== Cast ==
- Manohar Singh as Shamsher Singh
- Habib Tanvir as Akhtar Baig
- B. M. Shah as Murlimanohar Joshi
- Pankaj Kapur as Rohit, student leader
- Sushmita Mukherjee as Savita, journalist
- Naseeruddin Shah as Trivedi, Industrialist
- Ajit Vachani as Police Superintendent
- Lalit Tiwari as Srikant
- Rajendra Gupta as Vice-Chancellor Asthana
- Kusum Haider as Ismat
- Alok Nath
- Raja Bundela as Uttam Trivedi, the Industrialist's Son
- Rajendranath Zutshi
- Anil Rastogi
- Vimal Banerjee as DIG Mishra
- Swadesh Bandhu as City Magistrate
