= Belli Lalitha =

Indian folk singer (1971–1999)

- Born: 29 April 1971; Yadadri Bhuvanagiri, India
- Died: 26 May 1999 (aged 28)
- Cause of death: Homicide
- Occupation: Folk singer

Belli Lalitha (29 April 1971 – 26 May 1999) was an Indian folk singer and founder of Telangana Kala Samithi who was murdered in 1999.

== Life ==
She was born in Nancharipet, Motakondur Mandal, Yadadri Bhuvanagiri district in a Telugu-speaking Kuruma family. She had a brother, Belli Krishna, an activist and a government employee and five sisters. She was active in the civil liberties movement and an activist for statehood for Telangana region in the late 1990s. Her father was an Oggu Katha singer and a labourer. She was fighting for the cause of Telangana statehood and was immensely popular in rural areas. She was offered a seat by Samajwadi Party in 1999 elections from Bhongir constituency before she was killed.

== Death ==
In 1999, she was kidnapped, assaulted, and hacked with an axe to the point her body parts were dismembered into 17 pieces. Her dismembered body parts were then thrown in front of the Choutupoal police station by the assailants. Initially, the then TDP government home minister Alimineti Madhava Reddy was implicated in the murder but later cleared after further evidence pointed to local Naxalite godfather and kingpin Mohammed Nayeemuddin. Three of her brother-in-laws were also killed, the remaining brother Krishna hiding from 2000 to 2017.
