= Neem Ka Ped =

- Genre: Drama
- Written by: Rahi Masoom Raza
- Directed by: Gurbir Singh Grewal
- Starring: Pankaj Kapoor, Arun Bali
- Country of origin: India
- Original language: Hindi

Production
- Producer: Nawman Malik
- Running time: 25 minutes

Original release
- Network: DD National
- Release: 1991

Neem Ka Ped is an Indian television drama-series that was edited and directed by Gurbir Singh Grewal and produced by Nawman Malik. It was written by Dr. Rahi Masoom Raza.

Actor Pankaj Kapur played bonded labourer "Budhai Ram" who lives in a village with a Muslim Zamindar (landlord). The title song for this serial was written by lyricist-poet Nida Fazli and sung by Jagjit Singh called Muh Ki Baat Suney Har Koi...

The show was cherished by speakers of Awadhi for using their dialect, along with Hindi-Urdu, in its dialogues.

Neem Ka Ped first aired in 1991 on the Indian state television channel DD Lucknow, which is owned and operated by Doordarshan national network.

== Making ==
The serial is based on a short story by Vilayat Jafri, who was the station director in Doordarshan Lucknow. He handed over the story to Dr. Rahi Masoom Raza who developed it into a full-fledged TV series. Dr. Rahi Masoom Reza died in 1992. Till that time he had penned 26 episodes of the series. Later the series when approved for Doordarshan's National Network, the serial was completed in 58 episodes by Vilayat Jafri and his name appeared as additional writer in the credits. All episodes of the serial were shot in the village known as tiyari which is in the district of Sultanpur, Uttar Pradesh.

Based on the series, the story was turned into a book titled Neem Ka Ped as well.

== Plot ==
Neem Ka Ped tells the story of a "asami" (tenant/serf labourer) and his landlord. The story starts in pre-independent India and ends in post-independent India, showing the vagaries of both the feudal and democratic systems in India with its darker side. The main protagonist is a landless labourer Budhai Ram (Pankaj Kapoor), who is very faithful and obedient to his master (landlord Zaamin Miya played by Arun Bali), and dreams only of making his only son Sukhi Ram an educated person. Fortunes dwindle in landlord's home and he is sentenced to jail for murder of an upcoming politician because of manipulations of his cousin (Muslim Miya, played by S.M. Zaheer), who is also a politician and landlord but nurses a grudge against Zaamin Miya.

After independence, Sukhi Ram becomes a Member of Parliament (MP), and the son of landlord (Zaamin Miya) his trusted aide and advisor, but as the saying goes - power corrupts. The son of labourer who has now became an M.P. gets corrupt and selfish, and in that, he is destroyed.

Budhai Ram had planted a neem tree when his son was born. The tree and his son both flourish, and the tree is used as a metaphor in the show, for the ups and downs in Budhai's life.

== Cast ==
- Pankaj Kapur as Budhai Ram
- Arun Bali as Zaamin Miyan
- S. M. Zaheer as Muslim Miya
- Vijay Mishra as Pankaj
- Preeti Khare as Chitra
- Vijay Vastava as Anand
- V. N. Mishra as Manohar
- Surendra Sharma as Sunil
- Sakshi Tanwar as Gayatri
