= Maximum (film) =

- Theatrical release poster
- Directed by: Kabeer Kaushik
- Written by: Kabeer Kaushik
- Produced by: Kabeer Kaushik
- Starring: Sonu Sood; Naseeruddin Shah; Neha Dhupia; Vinay Pathak
- Cinematography: Krishna Ramanan
- Edited by: Lionel Fernandes
- Music by: Amjad-Nadeem; Vikram-Sawan; Wali Hamid Ali; Kamran; Saaji; Daniel B. George; Devi Sri Prasad
- Production company: Vainteya Films
- Release date: 29 June 2012
- Country: India
- Language: Hindi

Maximum is a 2012 Indian Hindi-language crime thriller film written, directed, and produced by Kabeer Kaushik. The film stars Naseeruddin Shah, Sonu Sood, Neha Dhupia and Vinay Pathak. Maximum was released on 29 June 2012.

== Plot ==
Maximum revolves around two of Mumbai Police's top encounter specialists and their fight for control. The movie is set in Mumbai in 2003. This fight goes through a maze of politics, land deals, fake encounters, and bad money. Pundit (Sonu Sood) and Inamdar (Naseeruddin Shah) try to overtake each other for power. Each kills the other's informers and divides the Mumbai police. Inamdar and his superiors frame Pundit, and he gets suspended. Pundit comes back into the force with the help of a minister, Tiwari (Vinay Pathak). After the Mumbai bombing, Inamdar is removed from his position, and Pundit is reinstated. Meanwhile, Tiwari takes responsibility for the elections. One night when he is at home, his accomplices are shot. He goes to check and finds the culprit to be Pundit. Pundit shoots Tiwari.

In the flashback, it is shown that while Pundit is travelling with his wife, Supriya (Neha Dhupia) shots are fired. In the confusion, his car falls into a jungle. After that, he shoots all the people and says that they were Niranjan's people. But when he comes back, he realises that his wife is no more. Then it is revealed that Tiwari had an offer from the Home Ministry and 700 million from Pundit's enemies in exchange for killing Pundit. Instead, his men killed Pundit's wife. That was the reason Pundit shot Tiwari.

Before dying, Tiwari confesses that he should not have done what he did. Pundit asks whether Subodh (his superior) knew of this. Finally, Pundit shoots Tiwari.

Pundit hands over property documents to a reporter. The reporter tells him that there is no going back once this goes public. Pundit says that he does not want to return. Pundit comes with his daughter and the reporter to leave the city. Meanwhile, Inamdar and his men start shooting at them. Many people from both sides are killed. Meanwhile, the train is about to start. Pundit sends his daughter with his brother and the reporter to catch the train. She is unwilling to leave without him but finally does. An open shootout follows in which both Pundit and Inamdar are shot. A severely injured Pundit runs towards the train to meet his daughter. Before he can do so, he is shot by Inamdar. Before dying, he manages to shoot Inamdar. Pundit has a last look at his daughter before finally dropping dead.

== Cast ==
- Sonu Sood as Inspector Pratap Pandit
- Naseeruddin Shah as Inspector Arun Imadar
- Neha Dhupia as Supriya
- Vinay Pathak as Tiwari
- Rajendra Gupta as Babaji
- Arya Babbar as Nanda
- Mohan Agashe as Sathe
- Amit Sadh as Ashwin Singh
- Raju Shrestha as Mushtaq
- Swanand Kirkire as Bachi Singh
- Murali Sharma as Police Inspector
- Anjana Sukhani
- Nishikant Dixit as Advocate Suri
- Hazel Keech as Meena (item dancer in the song "Ae Aante Amalapuram")

== Soundtrack ==
Maximum

Soundtrack album by Devi Sri Prasad, Amjad-Nadeem, Vikram-Sawan, Daniel B George, Wali Hamid Ali, Kamran, and Saaji
- Released: 14 June 2012
- Genre: Feature film soundtrack
- Length: 28:57
- Language: Hindi
- Label: T-Series

The soundtrack is composed by Amjad-Nadeem, Vikram-Sawan, Wali Hamid Ali, Kamran, Saaji, and Devi Sri Prasad, with lyrics written by Raqueeb Alam and Shabbir Ahmed.

Track listing
No.	Title	Music	Singer(s)	Length
1.	"Aa Ante Amalapuram"	Devi Sri Prasad	Malathy Lakshman	5:30
2.	"Ya Maula"	Vikram-Sawan	Shafqat Amanat Ali
3.	"Aaja Meri Jaan"	Amjad-Nadeem	Tochi Raina, Ritu Pathak	4:33
4.	"Sutta"	Amjad-Nadeem	Nadeem Khan, Tulsi Kumar
5.	"Namami Shamishan"	Daniel B George	Bandini Sharma
6.	"Maan Qunto Maula"	Wali Hamid Ali, Kamran, Saaji	Raga Boys

== Reception ==
=== Critical reception ===
Maximum garnered generally negative reviews. Aniruddha Guha of DNA gave it 2 stars out of 5 and wrote – "Maximum ends up as a 'me too' among many RGV-inspired films in the last few years, even though that may not have been the intention. Sadly, there was potential." Janhavi Patel of FilmiTadka rated Maximum with 2 out of 5 stars and wrote in her review, "There is not much to remember when you walk out. The twist in the end is the saving grace of the movie, if we can call it that. Maximum does not deserve your time or money." Saibal Chatterjee of NDTV gave it 2.5 out of five stars and said, "Maximum isn't a washout – not by a long chalk. It is well crafted and superbly acted. Sonu Sood in particular leaves a lasting impression as the police officer under fire for excesses committed in the line of duty. The cameos by Vinay Pathak and Rajendra Gupta are impressive. Sadly, the effort is maximum, the impact not quite so." Madhureeta Mukherjee writing for Times of India rated it with 3 out of five stars. Writing for Hindustan Times, Anupama Chopra gave Maximum 2 stars and commented, "Maximum has stray moments of power but the film feels like a Ram Gopal Varma rehash; mercifully though there are no cameras zooming into teacups like there were in Varma's recently released Department, which was also about power-hungry, corrupt encounter specialists."
