= Sudhir Mishra =

Indian film director and screenwriter

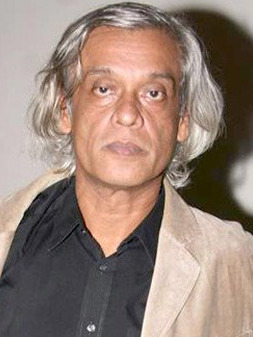
- Mishra in 2010
- Born: 22 January 1959 (age 67); Lucknow, India
- Occupation: Filmmaker
- Years active: 1980–present
- Spouses: Sushmita Mukherjee (m. 1978, divorced) Renu Saluja (m. 1988; died 2000)
- Relatives: Devendra Nath Mishra (father); Dwarka Prasad Mishra (grandfather)

Sudhir Mishra (born 22 January 1959) is an Indian filmmaker. His most notable films include Dharavi (1992), Hazaaron Khwaishein Aisi (2003), Chameli (2004), and Serious Men (2020). His work has been recognised with three national awards by the Indian government and the Order of Arts and Letters by the French government.

== Early life ==
Sudhir Mishra was born in Lucknow on 22 January 1959. He has a younger brother named Sudhanshu. His father, Devendra Nath Mishra (died 2020), was a mathematics professor who served as the 19th vice-chancellor of Banaras Hindu University and co-founded the Lucknow Film Society. His grandfather, Dwarka Prasad Mishra (1901–1988), was a politician and journalist who served as the 4th chief minister of Madhya Pradesh.

After spending 18 months under the tutelage of theatre director Badal Sircar, Mishra moved to Pune, Sudhanshu was a student at the Film and Television Institute of India; though he never studied at the institute himself, he spent the majority of his free time there and later credited Sudhanshu with teaching him much of his filmmaking knowledge. He later gained a Master of Philosophy from an institute in Delhi.

== Career ==
Mishra moved to Mumbai in 1980 and started his career as an assistant director and scriptwriter in Kundan Shah's comedy Jaane Bhi Do Yaaron (1983). He later worked with Saeed Akhtar Mirza in Mohan Joshi Hazir Ho! (1984) and with Vidhu Vinod Chopra in Khamosh (1985). He made his directorial debut with Yeh Woh Manzil To Nahin (1987), which won the National Film Award for Best First Film of a Director.

Mishra went on to make films including Main Zinda Hoon (1988), Dharavi (1991), Is Raat Ki Subah Nahin (1996), Chameli (2003), Hazaaron Khwaishein Aisi (2003), Khoya Khoya Chand (2007), Yeh Saali Zindagi (2011), and Inkaar (2013). He then wrote and directed Daas Dev (2018) starring Rahul Bhat and Richa Chaddha. After this, he directed Hostages, an adaptation of the Israeli show of the same name. The show got mixed reviews but received critical acclaim for the performances of Ronit Roy and Tisca Chopra. A second season for the show was made in 2020.

Mishra next adapted Manu Joseph's award-winning novel Serious Men in co-production with Bombay Fables for Netflix India. The film, released in October 2020, received favorable reviews by critics and viewers. Indian film critic Mayank Shekhar said, "This is a subtle, mature satire, rather than [a] LOL comedy of manners (would've enjoyed some of the latter too) [...] in all its overt simplicity, this is also a complex story — about failure, first; and on the underclass, only later." The film won Best Web Original Film Award at Filmfare OTT Awards 2021, and Best Editing and Best Cinematography at the Asian Academy Creative Awards. Actor Nawazuddin Siddiqui received a nomination at the International Emmy Awards and won best actor at the Filmfare OTT Awards 2021 for his performance.

== Personal life ==
Mishra married actress Sushmita Mukherjee in 1978; they divorced at an unknown date, but remained friends. He was then married to editor Renu Saluja from 1988 until her death from stomach cancer in August 2000.

== Awards ==
- 1987 Indira Gandhi Award for Best Debut Film of a Director: Yeh Woh Manzil To Nahin (1987)
- 1988 National Film Award for Best Film on Other Social Issues: Main Zinda Hoon (1988)
- 1991 National Film Award for Best Feature Film in Hindi: Dharavi (1991)
- 2006 Filmfare Best Story Award: Hazaaron Khwaishein Aisi (2005)
- 2010 Ordre des Arts et des Lettres (French government)
- 2016 Yash Bharti Award by the Government of Uttar Pradesh.

== Filmography ==
=== Films ===
As director

Year	Film	Director	Screenwriter	Notes
1983	Jaane Bhi Do Yaaron		Yes	
1982	Mohan Joshi Hazir Ho!		Yes	
1985	Khamosh		Yes	
1987	Yeh Woh Manzil To Nahin	Yes	Yes	
1988	Main Zinda Hoon	Yes	Yes	
1991	Dharavi	Yes	Yes	
1996	Is Raat Ki Subah Nahin	Yes	Yes	
1999	Arjun Pandit		Yes	
1999	Nyaay	Yes		TV series
2003	Calcutta Mail	Yes	Yes	Remake of Choodalani Vundi
2004	Chameli	Yes	Yes	
2005	Hazaaron Khwaishein Aisi	Yes	Yes	
2007	Khoya Khoya Chand	Yes	Yes	
2010	Tera Kya Hoga Johnny	Yes	Yes	
2011	Yeh Saali Zindagi	Yes	Yes	
2011	Mumbai Cutting	Yes	Yes	Segment: The Ball
2013	Inkaar	Yes	Yes	
2013	Kirchiyaan	Yes	Yes	Short film
2017	Life Support	Yes	Yes	Short film
2018	Daas Dev	Yes	Yes	
2020	Serious Men	Yes		Adaptation of Serious Men
2023	Afwaah	Yes	Yes	

As actor

Year	Film	Role
1985	Khamosh	
2007	Traffic Signal	Haji Bhaijaan
2010	Raat Gayi, Baat Gayi?	Archana's dad

=== TV series ===
Year	Title	Role	Notes
1999	Nyaay	Director	
2004	India's Best Cinestars Ki Khoj	Mentor	
2019	Hostages	Director	
2022	Tanaav	Director	
2023	Jehanabad - Of Love & War	Showrunner	
2025	Crime Beat	Director	
