= Main Zinda Hoon =

- Poster
- Directed by: Sudhir Mishra
- Written by: Sudhir Mishra
- Screenplay by: Sudhir Mishra
- Story by: Sudhir Mishra
- Produced by: NFDC; Doordarshan
- Starring: Rajendra Gupta; Pankaj Kapur; Deepti Naval; Alok Nath
- Cinematography: Rajesh Joshi
- Edited by: Renu Saluja
- Distributed by: Doordarshan
- Release date: 5 June 1988 (India)
- Running time: 114 min.
- Country: India
- Language: Hindi

Main Zinda Hoon (transl. I am alive) is a 1988 Indian Hindi-language drama film written and directed by Sudhir Mishra, starring Rajendra Gupta, Pankaj Kapur, Deepti Naval and Alok Nath.

At the 36th National Film Awards, the film won the National Film Award for Best Film on Social Issues. The film was produced by National Film Development Corporation of India (NFDC), which in 2012, included it in its film restoration project, which involved 80 Indian cinema classics.

== Plot ==
Beena is a village girl, who is married into a middle-class family in the city. However, her husband leaves her soon after wedding. She starts working and supports his family. Eventually, she falls in love with a co-worker. That is when her husband returns.

== Cast ==
- Deepti Naval as Beena
- Pankaj Kapur as Ravi
- Alok Nath as Alok
- Kulbhushan Kharbanda as Father
- Sushmita Mukherjee as Anjali
- Rajendra Gupta as Father-in-law
- Sarita Joshi as Mother-in-law
