= Jagannath Aur Purvi Ki Dosti Anokhi =

Indian Hindi television serial

- Poster of Jagannath aur Purvi Ki Dosti Anokhi
- Screenplay by: Rajita Sharma
- Story by: Rajita Sharma
- Directed by: Yusuf Farooq Ansari
- Creative director: Kunika Choudhary
- Starring: See below
- Theme music composer: Devendra Bhome
- Country of origin: India
- Original language: Hindi
- No. of seasons: 1
- No. of episodes: 90

Production
- Producers: Rajita Sharma; Vivek Budakoti
- Production locations: Varanasi; Mumbai
- Editor: Shatrujeet Singh
- Running time: 20–22 minutes
- Production company: Katha Kottage Production

Original release
- Network: Sony Entertainment Television
- Release: 7 February – 10 June 2022

Jagannath Aur Purvi Ki Dosti Anokhi, also known as Dosti Anokhi, (transl. Strange friendship of Purvi & Jagannath) is an Indian Hindi language television serial produced by Rajita Sharma and Vivek Budakoti. It features Ishmeet Kohli, Rajendra Gupta, and Sushmita Mukherjee in the lead roles. It is made under the banner of Katha Kottage Production. The show aired from 7 February 2022 to 10 June 2022 on Sony TV.

The story is about an older couple, Pandit Jagannath and Kusum Mishra, and a girl named Purvi Singh, and their story after the Mishras' son, daughter-in-law, and daughter have emigrated. The programme is focused on the time after 72-year-old Jagannath saves Poorvi's life and brings her to the Mishras' house.

== Plot ==
72-year-old Pandit Jagannath Mishra, a former officer at Jal Nigam Varanasi, lives with his wife Kusum in the holy town of Varanasi. They have one son, Alok, and one daughter, Deepa, both of whom have left the house and emigrated abroad with their respective spouses. Meanwhile, in the city of Gorakhpur, a young girl named Purvi Singh is in love with a boy named Babu Tripathi. Due to caste differences, she hides the relationship from her parents, who later find out and decide to marry Purvi to another man who is the same caste as her. Purvi runs away on the day of her engagement and leaves for Varanasi to meet Babu, who is unaware of everything. Upon reaching Benares, Babu angrily scolds her for eloping. Babu's reaction angers Poorvi, who jumps into the Ganges to commit suicide, but she is rescued by Pandit Jagannath. He takes her to his house and tells his wife of what has happened.

Purvi does not immediately tell Jagannath and Kusum about her life, but later, when Pandit Jagannath finds out Purvi's reasons for leaving home and trying to commit suicide, he calls Poorvi's parents. When Purvi's parents come to collect her, they scold and beat Poorvi instead of showing her love and compassion. When Jagannath witnesses Purvi being beaten by her parents, he saves Purvi and scolds her parents in return. Purvi's parents say that, from then on, they believe their daughter to be dead to them and leave. Jagannath allows Purvi to stay at the Mishras' house, and she agrees.

Purvi sees her boyfriend Babu every day. As Purvi begins to know the rude but lovely behaviour of Jagannath, she decides to change him for the better. Jagannath's friend Viren has a pension issue, which is solved by Purvi. However, in doing so, she is unable to celebrate Valentine's Day with Babu. When she meets him, Babu scolds her. Later, Jagannath gives Purvi a genda (Marigold) bouquet as a friendship memory, which she accepts. Viren's Pension letter was bought by Jagannath but when he goes to his home, Jagannath knows that his Best Friend Viren is no more and attends the last rituals of Viren in Harish Chandra Ghat of Varanasi. Where Viren's Son leaves his father body in fire alone. Jagannath was so much depressed and comes home. He tells Kusum don't do behaviour like Viren's son after his death. After missing her best friend, Jagannath becomes lonely and Purvi decides to make him again normal and she got success in her mission. All was going good, but Jagannath suffered a heart attack because of misinformation spread by Viren's Son by help of Subodh. Purvi sold her jewelry for Jagannath's treatment, which make the old couples emotional. Now Jagannath and Purvi have become good friends and the day came for court marriage of Purvi with Babu, she gets ready and went to Kacheri of Varanasi, but Babu does not show up. Later, he does come and tells her that he does not love her, and only did everything for the sake of hurting her. Jagannath tells Purvi to forget Babu and to start a new life, which is a proposition she accepts.

Soon, Jagannath's children begin to know about Purvi, and decide that she should be removed from their family's house. They came to Varanasi, where firstly Alok returns Jewels of Purvi to her. Now both children force Purvi to return to Gorakhpur and she decides finally. Jagannath and Kusum stop her, but they were unable to do it so. Purvi's Parents came to Jagannath's home, where Purvi's father tells that they can't bring Purvi back and they will put her in an Orphanage (Nari Niketan) but Kusum stops and tells that Purvi will live with them only and her parents goes back. Now Purvi knows that she is pregnant of child of Babu. Kusum goes to Subodh's shop and tells about Purvi where he disrespects with Kusum. After knowing the behaviour of Subodh, Jagannath goes to his house where Subodh beats Jagannath and Kashi saves him and he starts fight with Subodh Kant where Purvi screams and tells that she will not abort her baby and all leaves. Subodh wants to contest the election from Varanasi, but recognizes that Purvi's pregnancy could be a problem for him, so he decides to kill Purvi. Alok wants to open his Varanasi Saree Factory and takes a contract with Subodh and mortgages his house by the giving fake sign of his father. Subodh forces Alok to remove Purvi from his house, but he was unable to do it because of his mother and father. Subodh tells Alok that if he will not give interest, he will lose his house. In between this, Isha is accidentally shot by a gun in place of Purvi, and all the neighbours start a boycott of the Mishra family from society. Subodh take benefits of this and threats all family members. Now, All knows about the contract between Alok and Subodh. They were unable to meet the money requirements and Subodh starts the bid of selling of Jagannath's house and materials but Kashi comes and gives the rest of the money to Subodh and Subodh starts again misbehaving but Purvi gives him a strong Slap and he leaves from there. Later, Purvi tells all that Kashi has sold his Travel Agency for money. Kusum tells Deepa to return Delhi and Gunjan to Allahabad with Alok. Isha refuses to return Delhi and stays in Varanasi. Jagannath starts to look for work to return the money of Kashi, but he is not accepted. Purvi also finds work and gets a job of RJ in Radio Banaras. Kusum starts an achaar business on the advice of Isha and they get money for Kashi. Firstly Kashi refuses to take money but later accepts. Isha has feelings for Kashi from beginning and finally proposes to him, but he refuses because he loves Purvi. Deepa tells Kusum about the feelings of Isha to Kashi and Kusum tells Deepa to came to Varanasi. Kusum meets Kashi and asks to marry Isha, but Kashi tells her feeling to Purvi. Kusum tells Kashi to share her feelings to Purvi. The next day, Purvi meets him and Kashi says about his feelings. Purvi said that she doesn't want to break the friendship her and him have, and leaves. Now Isha calls her father Mayank, but he misbehaves with her and Deepa saves Isha. Now, Deepa and Isha leave for Delhi and Jagannath has forgiven Deepa. Purvi knows that Jagannath's father was very strict with him, so he does same with Alok. Purvi decides to reunite father and son with help of Kusum and she gets success. Kusum tells Jagannath that Purvi brought their house happiness back. Baby returns to their housework and all neighbours apologize to the Mishra Family. Kusum's Achar business is also going good.

One day, Purvi receives a phone call from her mother, who tells her that her father has died of a brain hemorrhage, and that she wants to apologize to Purvi. The Mishras do not allow Purvi's mother to live with them; instead, she is made to live in Delhi, and asks Purvi whether she will live with her or not. Purvi tells her mother that they have assumed that their daughter is dead. Kusum explains that Purvi's problem between her and her father is ended due to his death, and not to project that problem on her mother. She tells Purvi to go live with her mother. As Purvi packs, she sees the love locket of her and Kashi that was made by Isha. Purvi asks Kashi to tie the locket to her, and he does. Purvi tells Kashi to wait for her until her delivery. Purvi asks Jagannath to stop her, but he also tells her that it is time to leave. Purvi hugs Jagannath and starts crying. Purvi's mother arrives, and Purvi rushes to give her a hug. Both mother and daughter thank Jagannath and Kusum and leave. Jagannath laments that the couple are alone once more, but Kusum disagrees, as they have the sweet memories made with Purvi, and she tells him that if he calls her, she will rush to him. As all the clocks start ringing 9:00 a.m., Jagannath and Kusum begin their sweet, regular morning fight once again.

== Cast ==
=== Main ===
- Ishmeet Kohli as Purvi Mishra (formerly Singh): Jagannath and Kusum's adoptive granddaughter, Babu's ex-girlfriend, and Kashi's love interest
- Rajendra Gupta as Pandit Jagannath Mishra: Kusum's husband, Alok and Deepa's father, Isha's grandfather, Kashi's adoptive father, and Purvi's adoptive grandfather
- Sushmita Mukherjee as Kusum Mishra: Jagannath's wife, Alok and Deepa's mother, Isha's grandmother, Kashi's adoptive mother, and Purvi's adoptive grandmother
- Sahil Phull as Kashi: Jagannath and Kusum's adoptive son, and Purvi's love interest

=== Recurring ===
- Naman Arora as Badri
- Subir Rana as Annirudh "Babu" Tripathi: Purvi's ex-boyfriend
- Chitra Banerjee as Deepa Mishra: Jagannath and Kusum's daughter, Mayank's ex-wife, and Esha's mother
- Palak Jain as Esha Mishra: Mayank and Deepa's daughter
- Raj Singh Verma as Alok Mishra: Jagannath and Kusum's son
- Mamta Verma as Gunjan Mishra: Alok's wife, and Jagannath's and Kusum's daughter-in-law
- Muskkaan Sayed as Baby: the homemaker in the Mishras' House
- Sanjeev Singh Rathore as Subodh Kant Tripathi: Babu's father
- Priyamvada Sahay as Sandhya Tripathi: Babu's mother
- Sonali Jha as Dolly: Purvi's friend in Varanasi
- Akshay Verma as Mahendra Singh: Purvi's father
- Subeer Kasali as Purvi's mother

== See also ==
- List of programs broadcast by Sony Entertainment Television
