= Sushmita Mukherjee =

Indian actress

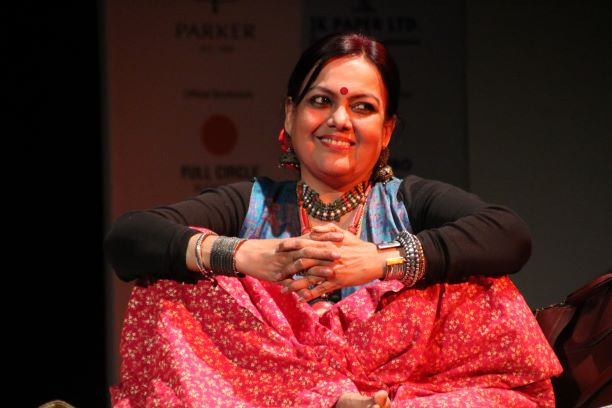
- Born: November 11, 1964 (age 61); Calcutta, West Bengal, India
- Other name: Sushmita Bundela Mukherjee
- Occupation: Actress
- Spouse(s): Sudhir Mishra (m. 1978, divorced) Raja Bundela
- Children: 2

Sushmita Mukherjee (Bengali pronunciation: [ʃuʃmita mukʰard͡ʒi]; born 11 November 1964) is an Indian actress with a career spanning Hindi cinema, television, and theatre. She became widely recognized for her performances in the television serial Gangaa, and the film Golmaal: Fun Unlimited (2006). Mukherjee has made notable contributions to both stage and screen.

She studied at Jesus and Mary College of the University of Delhi. She is an alumna of the National School of Drama, graduating in 1983. Sushmita was married to the director Sudhir Mishra. After her divorce, she married the actor, producer, and civil activist Raja Bundela and has two children. Her book 'Baanjh: Incomplete Lives of Complete Women' which is a collection of 11 short stories released in January 2021. She has acted in films with Jackie Shroff such as Khalnayak and King Uncle which also starred Madhuri Dixit and Sanjay Dutt in the former, and Shah Rukh Khan and Paresh Rawal in the latter. Currently, she is portraying the role of Kusum Mishra in Jagannath Aur Purvi Ki Dosti Anokhi at Sony TV. Currently, she is playing Rekha in Star Bharat show Meri Saas Bhoot Hai opposite Kajal Chauhan and Vibhav Roy.

== Filmography ==
=== Films ===
Year	Title	Role
2026	Nayyi Navelli	Dadi
2024	Patna Shuklla	Lata Jha
2023	Zara Hatke Zara Bachke	Roshni Chawla
2018	Batti Gul Meter Chalu	Judge
2018	Phir Se...	Mummy Ji
2016	Dil Toh Deewana Hai	Shikha
2016	1920 London	Kesar Maa
2016	Mastizaade	Seema Lele
2016	Kyaa Kool Hain Hum 3	Sindoor Bua
2015	Thoda Lutf Thoda Ishq	Jhumru's mother
2014	Sold	Mumtaz
2013	Kamasutra 3D	Queen
2010	Rakht Charitra	Gomti
2010	Rakht Charitra 2	Gomti
2010	Paathshaala	Mrs. Bose
2009	Teree Sang	Sushma Punjabi
2008	Dostana	Neha's Aunt
2008	Ugly Aur Pagli	
2008	The Other End of the Line	Priya's Mother
2007	Good Boy, Bad Boy	Prof. Bebo Chatterjee
2007	Khoya Khoya Chand	Sharda
2007	Aaja Nachle	Mrs. Chojar
2006	Vinaash	Under Production
2006	Golmaal	Dadi Ji/Mangala
2005	Koi Aap Sa	
2005	Kyaa Kool Hai Hum	Mrs. Hingorani
2004	Inteqam	
1999	Dillagi	
1994	Ikke Pe Ikka	Kuntiputhri Kuku
1994	Parmatma	
1993	Sir	Sweety
1993	King Uncle	Shanti
1993	Gitanjali	
1993	Aadmi Khilona Hai	Roopmati
1993	Rudaali	Budhwa's Wife
1992	Khalnayak	Mrs. Pandey
1992	Ghar Jamai	Prema
1991	Pratikar	Bal Kumari Diwani
1988	Main Zinda Hoon	Friend
1987	Yeh Woh Manzil To Nahin	Sabita

=== TV serials ===
Year	Title	Role
	Kaahin Kissii Roz	Avanti Rajpal (Ramola Sikand's Jethani)
	Talaash	
	Tara	Anita Seth
	Raam Khilawan CM and Family	
	Yeh Public Hai Sab Jaanti Hai	
	Meri Mrs. Chanchala	Chanchala
	Kavyanjali	Romilla Nanda
	Kulvaddhu	Rajlaxmi Singh Rathore
	Ghost Banaa Dost	
	Gunwale Dulhania Le Jayenge	Chandy
	Agle Janam Mohe Bitiya Hi Kijo	Gangiya (Loha's Mistress)
	Ek Nayi Chhoti Si Zindagi	Devki
	Karamchand	Kitty, Karamchand's assistant
	Isi Bahane	Lizzie
	Kabhi Saas Kabhi Bahu	Hema Awasthi
	Kab Tak Pukaroon Pyari	
	Housewife Hai Sab Jaanti Hai	Indrani Devi
	Madhubala – Ek Ishq Ek Junoon	Dai Maa
	Balika Vadhu	Subhadra
	Gangaa	Kanta Chaturvedi/ Ammaji
	Ishqbaaaz	Dolly Singh Oberoi / Bua Maa
	Dil Boley Oberoi	Dolly Singh Oberoi / Bua Maa
	TV, Biwi aur Main	Mausi Dadiji / Mausi ka bhoot
	Khichdi Returns	Sudha (Guest)
	Krishna Chali London	Krishna's aunt
2019–2022	Mind the Malhotras	Rishabh's mother
2022	Jagannath Aur Purvi Ki Dosti Anokhi	Kusum Mishra
2023	Meri Saas Bhoot Hai	Rekha
2025	Dabba Cartel	Tejasvi Tijori
