= Sehar =

- Movie poster
- Directed by: Kabeer Kaushik
- Written by: Kabeer Kaushik
- Produced by: Ashwin Patel
- Starring: Arshad Warsi; Mahima Chaudhry; Sushant Singh; Pankaj Kapur
- Cinematography: R. A. Krishna
- Edited by: Amitabh Shukla
- Music by: Daniel B. George
- Release date: 29 July 2005
- Running time: 125 minutes
- Country: India
- Language: Hindi
- Budget: ₹4 crore
- Box office: ₹2.4 crore

Sehar (transl. The Morning) is a 2005 Indian Hindi-language crime drama film directed by Kabeer Kaushik, starring Arshad Warsi, Mahima Chaudhry, Sushant Singh and Pankaj Kapur. The film depicts organized crime in the state of Uttar Pradesh in the 1990s, and how the police worked to tackle it. It is said to be loosely based on the encounter of gangster Shri Prakash Shukla, who was eliminated by the newly formed Special Task Force of the Uttar Pradesh Police.

== Plot ==
The film begins with Professor Tiwari being interviewed about police encounters and bids to eradicate organised crime from Lucknow and its surrounding areas. It then showcases Ajay Kumar. Since he was young, Ajay has been traumatised by the death of his army officer father, who killed himself when accused of being a deserter, leaving his widow Prabha to bring up Ajay on her own. Ajay studies hard and successfully becomes an Indian Police Service officer with the title of Senior Superintendent of Police of Lucknow. Due to his honesty, he gets transferred to various states in India, around 14 times in eight years. At his new posting in Uttar Pradesh, he comes to terms with a new criminal boss and ruthless killer, Gajraj Singh. Meanwhile, he falls in love with his childhood friend Anamika Kant, with his mother subsequently deciding to get them married. Ajay engineers the setting up of a Special Task Force to deal with Gajraj. However, he also runs into problems as Gajraj is politically well-connected. Gajraj continues to elude the Task Force, using more modern technology such as the use of cell phones. But the Task Force recovers and is able to monitor Gajraj's cell phones with the help of Prof. Tiwari. They find out that Gajraj is planning to contest the elections and if he wins, no police officer of any rank, even the Task Force, would then dare to arrest him or even consider him a suspect, which may well result in the Task Force being mere paper tigers. They have a final confrontation inside a train which leaves from Hazrat Nizamuddin railway station. All the officers in the Task Force as well as members of Gajraj's gang kill each other in the fight, leaving Prof. Tiwari as the only witness. Shukla

== Cast ==
- Arshad Warsi as SSP Ajay Kumar IPS
- Mahima Chaudhry as Anamika Kant
- Sushant Singh as Gajraj Singh (based on Prakash Shukla)
- Pankaj Kapur as Professor Bhole Shankar Tiwari
- Suhasini Mulay as Prabha Kumar, Ajay's mother
- Naved Aslam as Inspector Joginder Singh Solanki
- Rajendra Gupta as ADGP Arun Kapoor IPS
- Ujjwal Chopra as Inspector Sayyed
- Ghanshyam Garg as Sub Inspector Baidyanath Mishra
- Ravi Jhankal as Dwivedi, Mishra's secretary
- Kali Prasad Mukherjee as Ramprasad Chaudhary
- Surendra Pal as Ramnath Mishra
- Vikram Sahu as Hari Prasad Singh
- Rajendra Sethi as Builder Satyapal Mehra
- Vishnu Sharma as Chief Minister Raghuvir Singh
- Jeetpal as Inspector Yadav
- Kuldeep Sareen as Constable Lokpal
- Siddharth Tewatia as Siddhartha
- Suresh Dubey as Dubey
- Vivek Rawat as Qaasim
- Abhijeet Lahiri as Heeralal Gupta
- Ahmed Khan as PS Dheeraj Pandey
- Madan Joshi as Tarkeshwari Singh
- Amit Bhalla as SSP Gupta
- Anup Karan as Ranjan Munshi
- Vishal Saini as Shridhar Pandey
- Abhay Bhargav as Narayan Pandey

== Music ==
All the songs were composed by Daniel B. George, with lyrics written by Nilanjana Kishore and Swanand Kirkire.

1. "Nakhredaar Banno Aae Piya" – Shubha Mudgal
2. "Dil To Hai Bezubaan" – Adnan Sami
3. "Sapno Ka Sehar Ho" – Alka Yagnik
4. "Faiz" (Sehar) – Pankaj Kapur
5. "Palke Jhukao Na" (force) – Adnan Sami, Alka Yagnik
6. "Palke Jhukao Na" (sacrifice) – Adnan Sami, Alka Yagnik
7. "Palken Jhukao Na" (Duet) – Meenal Jain, Swanand Kirkire
8. "Prayer" – Swanand Kirkire

== Reception ==
Released on 60 screens alongside Shoojit Sircar's Yahaan, the film opened to mostly positive reviews from critics, but flopped at the box office.

Namrata Joshi of Outlook India gave the film three out of four stars, writing, "It's a film that left me flummoxed. It's engrossing, well-made, a good first effort. But what do I make of its message? That you can't escape bloodshed? That taking to arms is the only way out in a decaying society? That unbridled machismo is the way to cleanse the corrupt system?" She also mentioned the film in her book ″Reel India: Cinema Off the Beaten Track″, stating, ″Sehar succeeds in creating an authentic feel of the city [Lucknow] and state [Uttar Pradesh] as they are today, a virtual dystopia where things rarely function smoothly and law and order are flouted too often for comfort. It is vital, throbbing, real.″

Conversely, Taran Adarsh of IndiaFM gave the film one star out of five, writing, "On the whole, SEHAR is a dull and dry subject that will appeal to a very thin segment of moviegoers."

== Legacy ==
Sehar went on to gain cult status despite not doing well commercially at the time of its release and is considered one of the greatest performances of Warsi's career. Rediff listed the film in its list of ″Bollywood's Best Cop Films″ in 2009, stating, ″This gritty cop drama from director Kabeer Kaushik features Arshad Warsi as an IPS officer posted in Lucknow. Warsi delivers a stellar performance and the film is one of the better police portrayals in recent cinema.″

The film also got featured in Avijit Ghosh's book "40 Retakes: Bollywood Classics You May Have Missed".

== See also ==
- Rangbaaz – a web series based on same encounter.
