= K. S. Vyas =

Indian police officer (died 1993)

Kota Srinivas Vyas
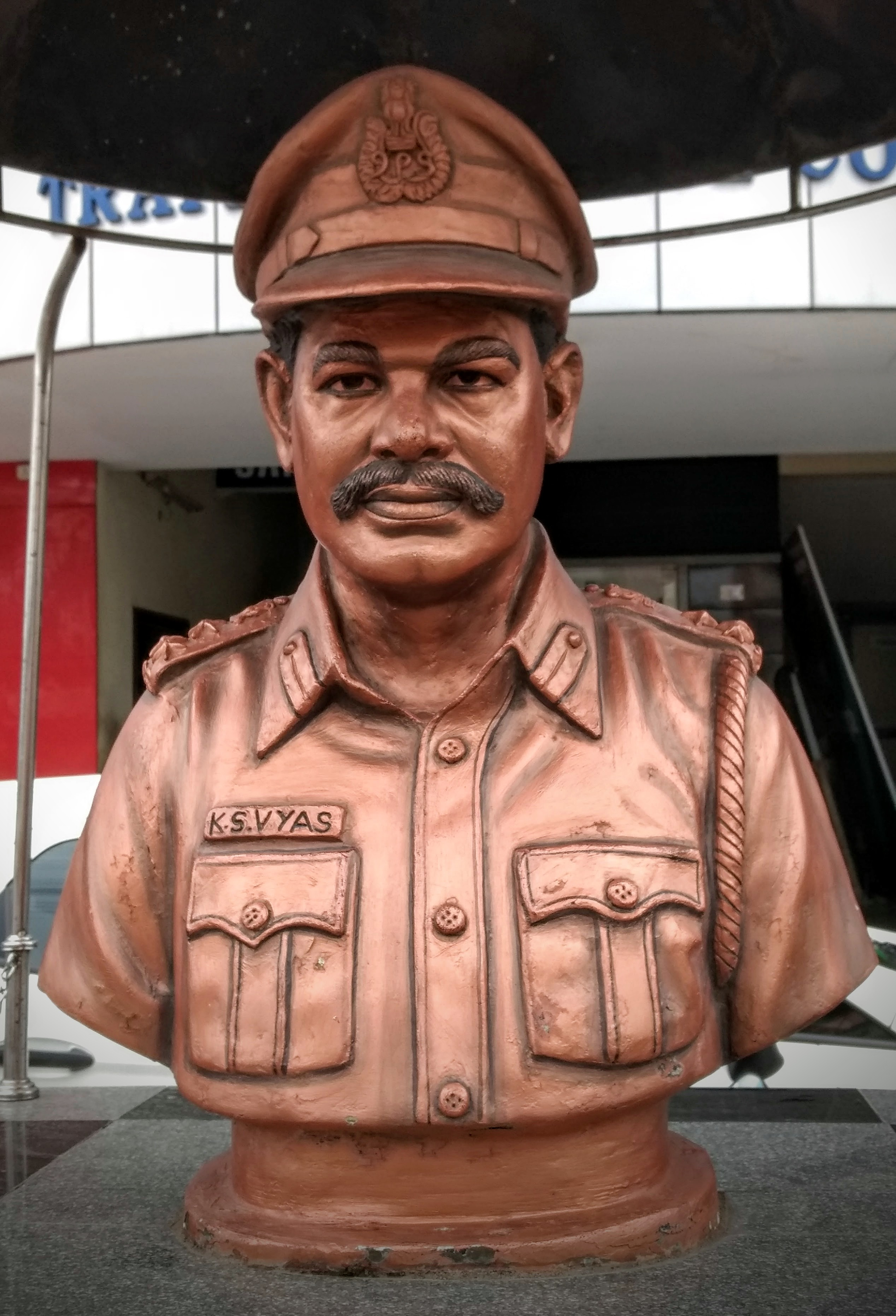
- K. S. Vyas bust in Vijayawada
- Born: Andhra Pradesh, India
- Died: 27 January 1993; Hyderabad, Andhra Pradesh (now in Telangana, India)
- Cause of death: Assassination by shooting
- Occupation: IPS Officer
- Spouse: Kota Aruna

Kota Srinivas Vyas was an Andhra Pradesh Cadre Indian Police Service officer of the 1974 batch. He is known for founding the Greyhounds police unit.

== Career ==
In 1989, he founded the elite Greyhounds.

== Death ==
K. S. Vyas was high on Communist Party of India (Marxist–Leninist) People's War's hit list because he was the architect of the elite Greyhounds to be exclusively involved in anti-Naxalite operations in the state. Though he eventually was moved out of anti-Naxalite task force, he was consulted regularly on operations.

On 27 January 1993, Kota was killed in a surprise attack by Mohammed Nayeemuddin and four other members of the CPI (M-L) People's War Group (PWG) while taking an evening jog at Lal Bahadur Shastri Stadium, Hyderabad. GreyHounds commandos subsequently hunted down and shot Mohammed Nayeemuddin to death at the Millenium Township in Shadnagar, 48 km from Hyderabad, on 8 August 2016.

A police complex has been named after Kota in Vijayawada and an annual memorial lecture is given at the APPA.
