= Sonali Bendre filmography =

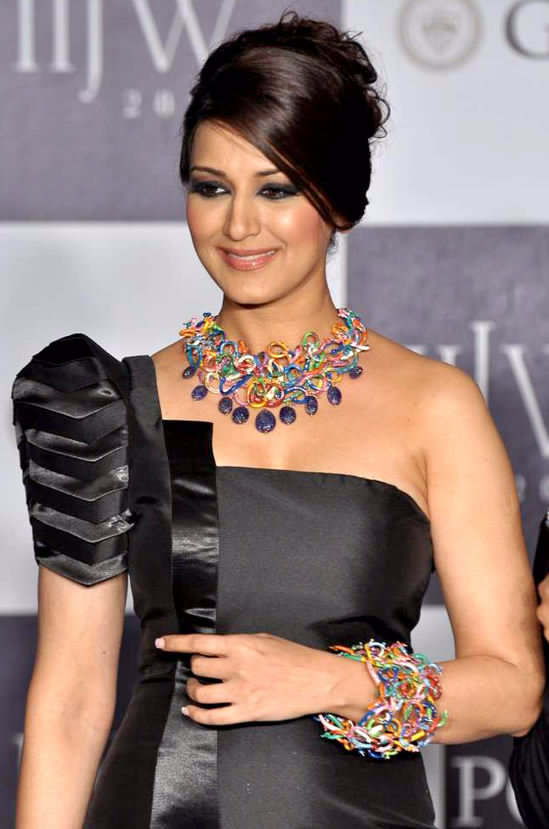
Bendre at an event in 2012

Sonali Bendre is an Indian actress widely known for her work in Hindi and Telugu films, along with a few appearances in Tamil, Marathi and Kannada cinema. Bendre made her acting debut with the action-drama Aag (1994), opposite Govinda, for which she received the Filmfare Lux New Face of the Year award. She gained further recognition with her role in the 1995 romantic thriller Takkar. Between 1994 and 1996, Bendre appeared in several commercially unsuccessful films, including the action-drama Gaddar (1995), action thriller Rakshak (1996), and romantic comedy English Babu Desi Mem (1996). Her first major box office success came with the romantic action Diljale (1996).

Bendre's prominence grew in the late 1990s with a series of successful films such as action comedy Duplicate (1998), romantic action Major Saab (1998), drama Zakhm (1998), action thriller Sarfarosh (1999), the highly successful family drama Hum Saath Saath Hain (1999) and romantic drama Hamara Dil Aapke Paas Hai (2000). Her performance in Sarfarosh earned her a nomination for the IIFA Award for Best Actress for Best Actress, while Hamara Dil Aapke Paas Hai won her the Screen Award for Best Supporting Actress.

Bendre made her Telugu film debut with the romantic drama Murari (2001), receiving a Filmfare Award nomination for Filmfare Best Actress – Telugu. Her subsequent successes in Telugu cinema include action drama Indra (2002), romantic comedy Manmadhudu (2002) and comedy drama Shankar Dada M.B.B.S. (2004). In Marathi cinema, she was awarded the Screen Award for Best Actress – Marathi for her role in Anahat (2003).

After a hiatus from films, Bendre transitioned to television, appearing in the series Ajeeb Daastaan Hai Ye (2014) and The Broken News (2022–2024). Her performance in The Broken News earned her a nomination at the Filmfare OTT Awards for Best Supporting Actress in a Drama Series. In addition to acting, Bendre has served as a talent judge on several Indian reality television shows, including Indian Idol, India's Got Talent, DID Li'ls Masters and India's Best Dancer 3.

== Films ==
Key
†	Denotes films that have not yet been released

List of Sonali Bendre film credits
Year	Title	Role(s)	Language	Notes	Ref.
1994	Aag	Parul	Hindi		
1994	Naaraaz	Sonali	Hindi		
1995	The Don	Anita Malik	Hindi		
1995	Gaddaar	Priya	Hindi		
1995	Takkar	Mohini	Hindi		
1995	Bombay	Dancer	Tamil	Special appearance in song "Humma Humma"	
1996	Rakshak	Dr. Pooja Malhotra	Hindi		
1996	English Babu Desi Mem	Bijuriya	Hindi		
1996	Diljale	Radhika	Hindi		
1996	Apne Dam Par	Herself	Hindi	Special appearance in song "Aara Hile Chapara Hile"	
1996	Sapoot	Kajal Singhania	Hindi		
1997	Bhai	Meenu	Hindi		
1997	Tarazu	Pooja	Hindi		
1997	Qahar	Neelam	Hindi		
1998	Keemat – They Are Back	Mansi	Hindi		
1998	Duplicate	Lily	Hindi		
1998	Humse Badhkar Kaun	Anu	Hindi		
1998	Major Saab	Nisha	Hindi		
1998	Angaaray	Roma	Hindi		
1998	Zakhm	Sonia Maheshwari	Hindi		
1999	Sarfarosh	Seema Nagrath	Hindi		
1999	Kadhalar Dhinam	Roja	Tamil		
1999	Kannodu Kanbathellam	Kalyani	Tamil		
1999	Hum Saath Saath Hain	Dr. Preeti Shukla Chaturvedi			
1999	Dahek	Sabina, Neelima (Note: Bendre portrayed dual roles in the film.)	Hindi		
2000	Chal Mere Bhai	Piya	Hindi	Cameo appearance	
2000	Hamara Dil Aapke Paas Hai	Khushi Malhotra	Hindi		
2000	Dhai Akshar Prem Ke	Nisha	Hindi	Special appearance	
2000	Jis Desh Mein Ganga Rehta Hain	Saavni	Hindi		
2000	Preethse	Kiran	Kannada		
2001	Murari	Vasu	Telugu		
2001	Love Ke Liye Kuch Bhi Karega	Sapna Chopra	Hindi		
2001	Lajja	Herself	Hindi	Special appearance in song "Mujhe Saajan Ke Ghar Jaana Hai"	
2001	Tera Mera Saath Rahen	Madhuri Khanna	Hindi		
2002	Indra	Pallavi	Telugu		
2002	Khadgam	Swathi	Telugu		
2002	Manmadhudu	Harika	Telugu		
2003	Anahat	Queen Sheelavathi	Marathi		
2003	Pyaar Kiya Nahin Jaatha	Disha	Hindi		
2003	Palanati Brahmanaidu	Siva Nageswari	Telugu		
2003	Chori Chori	Pooja Narayan	Hindi		
2003	Kal Ho Naa Ho	Dr. Priya Malhotra	Hindi	Special appearance	
2004	Shankar Dada M.B.B.S.	Dr. Sunita "Chitti"	Telugu		
2004	Aga Bai Arrecha!	Herself	Marathi	Special appearance in the song "Cham Cham Karta Hai"	
2013	Once Upon ay Time in Mumbai Dobaara!	Mumtaz Khan	Hindi		
2022	Love You Hamesha	Shivani	Hindi	Delayed release	
2025	Be Happy	Herself	Hindi	Cameo appearance	

== Television ==
List of Sonali Bendre television credits
Year	Title	Role	Notes	Ref.
2001–2002	Kya Masti Kya Dhoom	Host		
2005	50th Filmfare Awards	Host		
2008	Mr & Mrs Television	Judge		
2008–2009	Indian Idol	Judge	Season 4	
2009–2012	India's Got Talent	Judge	Seasons 1–3	
2012	Hindustan Ke Hunarbaaz	Judge		
2014	Mission Sapne	Narrator		
2014–2015	Ajeeb Daastaan Hai Ye	Shobha Sachdev		
2013–2016	India's Best Dramebaaz	Judge	Seasons 1–2	
2022	DID Li'ls Masters	Judge	Season 5	
2023	India's Best Dancer 3	Judge		
2022–2024	The Broken News	Amina Qureshi		
2025	Pati Patni Aur Panga	Host		
2026	Raakh	Mona Arora		

== See also ==
- List of awards and nominations received by Sonali Bendre
