= List of awards and nominations received by Sonali Bendre =

Sonali Bendre awards and nominations
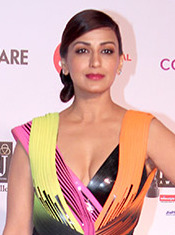
- Bendre at the 63rd Filmfare Awards in 2018
Awards and nominations
Award	Wins	Nominations
Bollywood Movie Awards	0	1
Filmfare Awards	2	2
IIFA Awards	0	2
Screen Awards	4	4
Zee Cine Awards	0	1
Indian Telly Awards	1	4

Totals (Note: Certain award groups do not simply award one winner. They acknowledge several different recipients, have runners-up, and have third place. Since this is a specific recognition and is different from losing an award, runner-up mentions are considered wins in this award tally. For simplification and to avoid errors, each award in this list has been presumed to have had a prior nomination.)
- Wins: 16
- Nominations: 28

Sonali Bendre Behl (born 1 January 1975) is an Indian actress predominantly known for her work in Hindi and Telugu films. She is a recipient of several accolades including two Filmfare Awards, four Screen Awards and one Indian Telly Award.

== Bollywood Movie Awards ==
Bendre has received one Bollywood Movie Awards nominations.

Year	Category	Film	Result	Ref.
2001	Best Supporting Actress	Hamara Dil Aapke Paas Hai	Nominated	

== Filmfare Awards ==
Bendre has won two Filmfare Awards from two nominations.

Year	Category	Film	Result	Ref.
1995	Sensational Debut	Naaraaz	Won	
1995	Lux New Face of the Year	Aag	Won	

== Filmfare OTT Awards ==
Bendre has received one Filmfare OTT Awards nomination.

Year	Category	Work	Result	Ref.
2022	Best Supporting Actress - Drama Series	The Broken News	Nominated	

== Filmfare Awards South ==
Bendre has received one Filmfare Awards South nomination.

Year	Category	Film	Result	Ref.
2001	Best Actress – Telugu	Murari	Nominated	

== International Indian Film Academy Awards ==
Bendre has received two International Indian Film Academy Awards nomination.

Year	Category	Film	Result	Ref.
2000	Best Actress	Sarfarosh	Nominated	
2001	Best Supporting Actress	Hamara Dil Aapke Paas Hai	Nominated	

== Indian Streaming Academy Awards ==
Bendre has won one Indian Streaming Academy Awards.

Year	Category	Work	Result	Ref.
2025	Best Actress – Critics (Series)	The Broken News 2	Won	

== Indian Telly Awards ==
Bendre has won one Indian Telly Awards from three nominations.

Year	Category	Work	Result	Ref.
2002	Best Anchor	Kya Masti Kya Dhum	Nominated	
2012	Best Judge Panel	India's Got Talent 3	Won	
2014	Best Judge	India's Best Dramebaaz	Nominated	
2015	Best Onscreen Couple	Ajeeb Daastaan Hai Ye	Nominated	

== Sansui Viewers' Choice Movie Awards ==
Bendre has received one Sansui Viewers' Choice Movie Awards nomination.

Year	Category	Film	Result	Ref.
2001	Best Supporting Actress	Hamara Dil Aapke Paas Hai	Nominated	

== Screen Awards ==
Bendre has won four Screen Awards from four nominations.

Year	Category	Film	Result	Ref.
1995	Most Promising Newcomer – Female	Aag	Won	
1995	Discovery of the Year	—N/a	Won	
2001	Best Supporting Actress	Hamara Dil Aapke Paas Hai	Won	
2004	Best Actress – Marathi	Anahat	Won	

== Zee Cine Awards ==
Bendre has received one Zee Cine Awards nomination.

Year	Category	Film	Result	Ref.
1998	Best Actor in a Supporting Role – Female	Duplicate	Nominated	

== Zee Rishtey Awards ==
Bendre has won two Zee Rishtey Awards.

Year	Category	Film	Result	Ref.
2017	Favourite TV Judge	India's Best Dramebaaz	Won	
2022	Favourite TV Judge	DID Li'ls Masters 5	Won	

== Other awards ==
Year	Award	Category	Work	Result	Ref.
2011	Colors Golden Petal Awards	Most Chahiti Personality	India's Got Talent	Won	
2022	OTT Play Awards	Best Debut Actress – Series	The Broken News	Won	

== Other honours ==
Year	Award	Category	Result	Ref.
2018	Women Achiever's Awards	Pride of Maharashtra	Won	
2019	I Am Woman Awards	Woman of Substance	Won	
2019	Vogue Beauty Awards	Beauty Warrior	Won	
2023	Bollywood Hungama Style Icons	Most Stylish Beautiful Diva	Won	
2024	Bollywood Hungama Style Icons	Fashion Icon of the Year	Nominated	
2024	Bollywood Hungama Style Icons	Haute-Stepper of the Year	Nominated	

== Media recognitions ==
- 2004: Bendre was placed 6th in Rediff.com's "Bollywood's Most Beautiful Actresses" list.
- 2014: Bendre was placed 36th in FHM India's "100 Sexiest Women" list.
- 2018: Bendre appeared among the most searched Indian personality on Google in Pakistan.
