= The Broken News 2 =

- Genre: Drama
- Based on: Press by Mike Bartlett
- Written by: Mike Bartlett; Sambit Mishra
- Directed by: Vinay Waikul
- Starring: Jaideep Ahlawat; Sonali Bendre; Shriya Pilgaonkar; Indraneil Sengupta; Taaruk Raina
- Music by: Aditya Pushkaran
- Country of origin: India
- Original language: Hindi
- No. of seasons: 2
- No. of episodes: 16

Production
- Producer: Sameer Gogate
- Cinematography: Harendra Singh
- Editor: Gaurav Agarwal
- Running time: 500
- Production company: BBC Studios India

The Broken News 2 is a 2024 Indian Hindi-language newsroom drama web series directed by Vinay Waikul on ZEE5 starring Jaideep Ahlawat, Sonali Bendre, Shriya Pilgaonkar, Indraneil Sengupta, and others. It is a sequel to the 2022 web series by the name of The Broken News, having almost the same star cast.

Both the sequels are a remake of the British series Press. It is written by Mike Bartlett, who created the original, and Sambit Mishra.

While Season 1 was released in June 2022, the second season premiered on May 3, 2024, again on ZEE5.

== Series overview ==
Season	Episodes	Originally released		
Season	Episodes	First released	Last released	Network
1	8	June 10, 2022	10 June 2022	ZEE5
2	8	May 3, 2024		ZEE5

=== Season 1 ===
It contained infights between Awaaz Bharati being headed by Amina Queresi Sonali Bendre and Josh 24/7 headed by Dipankar Sanyal Jaideep Ahlawat and ended with Radha Bhargava Shriya Pilgaonkar from Awaaz Bharati going to Jail in a framed up case.

=== Season 2 ===
After surviving the agonising time in prison, Radha's new approach towards journalism leaves everyone including Amina questioning her motives. Ready to make new enemies and avenge old ones, Radha's approach create conflicts with Dipankar leading to a battle between Awaaz Bharati and Josh 24x7, ensued by a new investor, that will rewrite the rules of ethical journalism. In the process, many such twists and turn take place, which finally end in an entirely unexpected and heartening end.

== Episodes ==
No. overall	Episode	Title	Date of Broadcast
1	1	"Urband Terrorist"	3 May 2024
2	2	"Sher Dil Shahenshah"	3 May 2024
3	3	"Radha Bhargav Kisi Se Nahi Darti"	3 May 2024
4	4	"Suo Mynona"	3 May 2024
5	5	"Journalist Hai Saaley"	3 May 2024
6	6	"Activist Radha Bhargav"	3 May 2024
7	7	"Sach Ki Shraddhanjali"	3 May 2024
8	8	"Ummeed Ki Kiran"	3 May 2024

== Cast ==
- Jaideep Ahlawat as Dipankar Sanyal, head of Josh 24x7
- Sonali Bendre as Ameena Qureshi, Radha's boss and head of Awaaz Bharati
- Shriya Pilgaonkar as Radha Bhargava
- Indraneil Sengupta as Pankaj Awasthi
- Taaruk Raina as Anuj Saxena, a journalist at Josh 24x7
- Aakash Khurana as Ketan Kedia
- Sanjeeta Bhattacharya as Juhi Shergill, a journalist at Awaaz Bharati
- Faisal Rashid as Kamal Wadia, a journalist at Awaaz Bharati
- Jay Upadhyay as Praful Gupta
- Jaywant Wadkar as Bhau
- Sukhmani Sadana as Arunima Sanyal

== Reception ==
The season drew praise from critics across board, just like The Broken News, Season 1.

The Indian Express stated, "...it borrows bravely from current events, and tells us how all ‘news’ can be ‘spun’ so that a particular point-of-view is cemented." Scroll.in remarked, "The newsroom drama is occasionally cracking. The corporate manipulations, boardroom priorities and the nexus with elected authorities are neatly woven in." News 18 awarded the show 4 out of 5 stars.

Saibal Chatterjee in his review for NDTV rated the show 2.5 out of 5 and stated, "Not that all of it hits home with equal force, but parts of The Broken News Season 2 do strike a chord and provoke thought."

Anuj Kumar in The Hindu calls it "An incisive X-ray of the news business Driven by convincing performances and compelling drama" saying that "director Vinay Waikul’s series exposes the moral ambiguities that dot the mediascape."

Sana Farzeen in India Today says "Watching ‘The Broken News 2’ feels like switching on a news channel and hearing the daily bulletin. There are words like 'urban naxal', 'propaganda', 'libtards', and 'social media manipulation' being thrown around during casual conversations." saying that "Spawn on different sides, they continue to fight the biggest battle between truth and ratings in the second season."
