= Sonali Bendre =

Indian actress (born 1975)

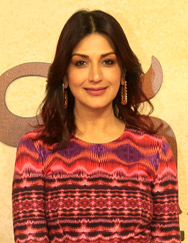
- Bendre in 2025
- Born: 1 January 1975 (age 51); Mumbai, Maharastra, India
- Education: Ramnarain Ruia College, Mumbai
- Occupation: Actress
- Years active: 1994–present
- Works: Full list
- Spouse: Goldie Behl (m. 2002)
- Children: 1
- Family: Behl family (by marriage)
- Awards: Full list

Sonali Bendre Behl (born 1 January 1975), is an Indian actress predominantly known for her work in Hindi and Telugu films. One of the leading actresses of the 1990s, Bendre is a recipient of several accolades including two Filmfare Awards, four Screen Awards and one Indian Telly Award.

Bendre started her career as a model and marked her acting debut with Aag (1994), which won her the Filmfare Award for New Face of the Year. Following several box office failures, she had her career breakthrough with the romantic action film Diljale (1996). Bendre achieved further success by featuring as the female lead in the action comedy Duplicate (1998), the action Major Saab (1998), the drama Zakhm (1998), the action thriller Sarfarosh (1999), the romantic Tamil film Kadhalar Dhinam (1999) and the highly successful family drama Hum Saath Saath Hain (1999).

In the following decade, Bendre's performance in the romantic drama Hamara Dil Aapke Paas Hai (2000), earned her the Screen Award for Best Supporting Actress. She further expanded to South Indian films with the Kannada psychological thriller Preethse (2000) and Telugu films with the romantic drama Murari (2001), for which she received Filmfare Award for Best Actress – Telugu nomination, the action drama Indra (2002), the romantic comedy Manmadhudu (2002) and the comedy drama Shankar Dada M.B.B.S. (2004), all of which were box office successes. Her portrayal of a queen in the Marathi film Anahat (2003), was followed by a hiatus from acting.

Bendre has since appeared as a judge on various reality shows including India's Got Talent and India's Best Dramebaaz. Later, Bendre starred in the television series Ajeeb Daastaan Hai Ye (2014) and The Broken News (2022–2024). The latter earned her a Filmfare OTT Awards nomination. Along with her acting career, Bendre is a celebrity endorser for brands and products. She is married to filmmaker Goldie Behl with whom she has a son.

== Early life and education ==
Sonali Bendre was born on 1 January 1975 in present-day Mumbai, Maharashtra. She has two sisters. Her father was a civil servant. She completed her schooling from Kendriya Vidyalaya, Bangalore and later completed her graduation from Podar College Matunga, Mumbai.

== Career ==
=== Modelling and early work (1994-1995) ===
Bendre started her career as a model and later entered the Stardust Talent Search. She made her screen debut with the 1994 film Aag, at the age of 19, playing a college student Parul opposite Govinda. For her performance, she won the Filmfare Award for Lux New Face of the Year and Screen Award for Best Female Debut. In the same year, she also appeared in Naaraaz, for which she earned the Filmfare Sensational Debut Award.

Bendre had three releases in 1995 with The Don opposite Mithun Chakraborty, Gaddaar and Takkar opposite Sunil Shetty. All these films turned to be box office averages. Following this, Bendre received recognition with the song "Humma Humma" from the film, Bombay, which emerged a box office success.

=== Established actress (1996–2000) ===
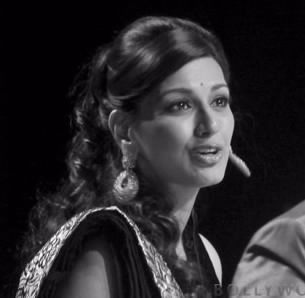
Bendre at an event in 2013

The year 1996 marked a turning point in Bendre's career with four film releases. She first starred opposite Sunil Shetty in two films - Rakshak and Sapoot. In Rakshak, she played a doctor, while in Sapoot, a dutiful wife. Following this, Bendre played Bijuriya, a village girl taking care of her sister's son in English Babu Desi Mem opposite Shah Rukh Khan. She played Radhika, a politician's daughter in Diljale, her last release of the year opposite Ajay Devgn. The film proved to be her breakthrough and Avinash Ramchandani noted, "Sonali Bendre is dashingly beautiful". English Babu Desi Mem became an overseas success, while Diljale became one of the year's highest grossing release. That year, she also appeared in the song "Aara Hile Chapara Hile", from Apne Dam Par. In 1997, Bendre starred in Bhai opposite Sunil Shetty, in Tarazu opposite Akshay Kumar and in Qahar opposite Sunny Deol. All these films had poor box office collections.

1998 was another successful year for Bendre, earning her commercial and critical success. She first appeared in Keemat – They Are Back opposite Saif Ali Khan, in Humse Badhkar Kaun and Angaaray opposite Nagarjuna. For Angaaray, Suparn Verma noted, "Sonali oozes sex appeal and is good in parts." She then played Lily, a gangster's girlfriend opposite Shah Rukh Khan in Duplicate, which was an average domestic success but a huge success overseas. She received Zee Cine Award for Best Actor in a Supporting Role – Female nomination for the film. Her next two release where opposite Ajay Devgn: Major Saab, where she played Nisha, a gangster's sister in love with an army officer. India Today found her to be "insipid". In Zakhm, she played Sonia, who with her husband is fed up with religious conflict. Anish Khanna noted that she made "an impact". Both Major Saab and Zakhm emerged among the highest grossing releases of the year.

In her first release of 1999, Bendre played Seema, a police officer's lover opposite Aamir Khan in Sarfarosh. A critic from Filmfare noted, "Sonali does justice to her first real role, the only one worth talking about, that is". The film became a commercial success and earned her IIFA Award for Best Actress nomination. She then expanded to Tamil films with Kadhalar Dhinam opposite Kunal, which was a box office success. D. S. Ramanujam of The Hindu wrote, "Sonali looks pretty and enjoys her portion in the dance and romantic sequences." She later appeared in another Tamil film Kannodu Kanbathellam opposite Arjun Sarja. Bendre then portrayed as shy doctor, Dr. Preeti in Hum Saath-Saath Hain opposite Salman Khan. The film emerged as the highest-grossing film of the year. While Anupama Chopra from India Today states, "The women mostly doll up, dance and cook", Alok Kumar opined, "Sonali don't really do much, but looks good doing whatever she does". Her year's last release came with Dahek opposite Akshaye Khanna, where she played dual roles of Sabina and Neelima, both being Hindu girls who falls in love with a Muslim boys.

Bendre had five releases in 2000. She first made brief cameos in Chal Mere Bhai and Dhai Akshar Prem Ke. She then played a NRI girl Khushi in Hamara Dil Aapke Paas Hai opposite Anil Kapoor, which was a commercial success. Her performance earned her the Screen Award for Best Supporting Actress. Reviewer from Planet Bollywood opined, "Bendre turns in a charming performance as Khushi. She looks beautiful and, for once, shows a glimmer of talent." In Jis Desh Mein Ganga Rehta Hain opposite Govinda, she played a village girl Saanvi. Sharmila Taliculam was appreciative of her for matching Govinda's dancing. It became a moderate success. In her final film of the year, Bendre made her Kannada film debut with Preethse, a remake of Darr, opposite Shiva Rajkumar and Upendra, where she played a college student Kiran. M D Riti of Rediff.com stated, "Bendre looked pretty but her role lacked significance." It emerged as one of the highest grossing Kannada film of the year.

=== Further success, television and hiatus (2001–2012) ===
In her first film of 2001, Bendre marked her Telugu film debut with Murari opposite Mahesh Babu. She played Vasundhara, an agricultural student and a critic of Sify found her to be "charming". It was a major box office success and she received Filmfare Award for Best Actress – Telugu nomination. She next appeared in Love Ke Liye Kuch Bhi Karega opposite Saif Ali Khan. Taran Adarsh stated, "Sonali Bendre doesn't get enough scope to display histrionics." She then appeared in the song "Saajan Ke Ghar Jaana Hai" in Lajja. In her last release of the year, Bendre reunited with Ajay Devgn in Tera Mera Saath Rahen, playing Madhuri, an independent women. Priyanka Bhattacharya noted, "Sonali looks pretty but is not given much scope to act." Both Love Ke Liye Kuch Bhi Karega and Tera Mera Saath Rahen were box office bombs.

Bendre went onto appear in three critically and commercially successful Telugu films in 2002. She first appeared in Indra opposite Chiranjeevi, playing Pallavi, a Governor's daughter. Reviewer from Idlebrain.com noted, "Sonali suited the role to tee and did her bit to perfection." She next appeared as Swathi in Khadgam opposite Srikanth. Later, she played a spirited assistant manager Harika opposite Nagarjuna in Manmadhudu. A critic from Sify stated, "Sonali is excellent and has played her role with conviction." Another critic stated, "The role requires Sonali to perform, not just appear as a glam doll. She takes the opportunity with zeal and does her role with ease." All these films emerged among the highest grossing Telugu films of the year, with Indra being one of the highest grossing South Indian film at that point of time.

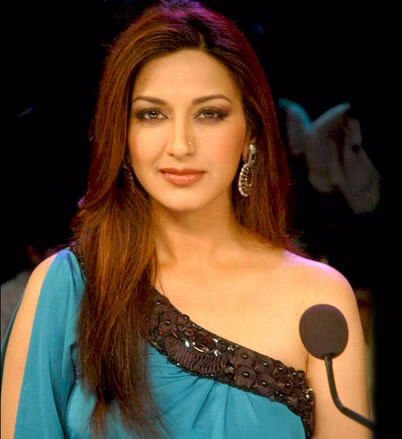
Bendre in 2011 on the sets of India's Got Talent

Bendre marked her Marathi film debut with her first release of 2003, Anahat. Her portrayal of Queen Sheelavathi earned her the Star Screen Award for Best Actress – Marathi. Pankaj Upadhyaya opined, "Sonali Bendre has never looked so good, so sensual." She next appeared in Pyaar Kiya Nahin Jaatha opposite Diwakar Pundir. In the Telugu film Palanati Brahmanaidu opposite Nandamuri Balakrishna, she played Sivanageshwari, an obsessive lover. Rediff.com's Vijayalaxmi found Bendre to be "good as the villain". Following this, Bendre played a modern girl Pooja in Chori Chori opposite Ajay Devgn, a box office average. Sukanya Verma noted, "Bendre is required to look both beautiful and jealous and does it admirably." Later, she played Dr. Priya, a cardiologist in Kal Ho Naa Ho alongside Shah Rukh Khan and Sanjay Kapoor. It emerged as the year's highest-grossing film.

In her only release of 2004, Bendre played Dr. Sunitha in Shankar Dada M.B.B.S., a remake of Munna Bhai M.B.B.S., opposite Chiranjeevi. It became a major commercial successful. A reviewer of Idlebrain.com noted, "Sonali Bendre is totally cool. She is the perfect choice for this role and has acted with ease.". Following an appearance in the song "Cham Cham Karta Hai", in the Marathi film Aga Bai Arrecha!'s, Bendre took a break from acting in films and shifted to television.

In 2007, Bendre starred in a theatre play called Aap Ki Soniya. In 2001, Bendre made her television debut as the host for the dance show Kya Masti Kya Dhoom....!. She went onto become a talent judge for Mr & Mrs Television (2008), the reality shows Indian Idol 4 (2008–2009), India's Got Talent (2009–2012), Hindustan Ke Hunarbaaz (2012). She also hosted the 50th Filmfare Awards with Saif Ali Khan and Farida Jalal on 26 February 2005.

=== Intermittent work and streaming projects (2013–present) ===
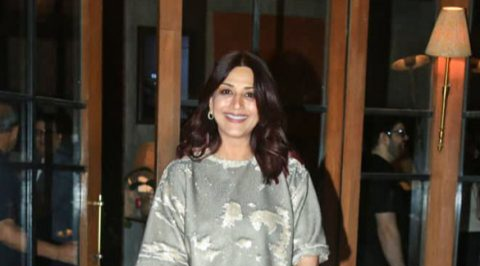
Bendre at an event in 2025

Following a hiatus of nine years, Bendre returned to films with Once Upon ay Time in Mumbai Dobaara! in 2013. Reuniting with Akshay Kumar, she played Mumtaz, a strong Muslim women. Anupama Chopra opined, "Sonali Bendre shines in the few scenes she has." The film however failed at the box office. From 2013 to 2016, Bendre judged India's Best Dramebaaz. In 2014, she turned narrator for Mission Sapne.

From 2014 to 2015, Bendre portrayed a strong housewife Shobha Sachdev opposite Apurva Agnihotri and Harsh Chhaya in the Life OK's series Ajeeb Dastaan Hai Yeh. It marked her television acting debut and earned her a nomination for Indian Telly Award for Best Onscreen Couple with Agnihotri.

Following another hiatus, her delayed 1997 film Love You Hamesha, opposite Akshaye Khanna, was released on YouTube in 2022. In the same year, she turned judge for DID Li'ls Masters Season 5, marking her television comeback after four years. In her final work of the year, Bendre made her streaming debut with The Broken News, portraying a news channel head Amina. Namrata Thakker noted, "Sonali stands out, delivering a nuanced performance. She aces the emotional scenes." While Saibal Chatterjee added, "Bendre, brings remarkable maturity and balance to bear upon her interpretation of her role." In 2023, Bendre judged India's Best Dancer 3.

In her only release of 2024, Bendre reprised her character Amina, in The Broken News 2, the second season of her web debut. Writing for The Indian Express, Shubhra Gupta was appreciative of her performance and called her the "strongest reason" to watch the series. Bendre began 2025 with a cameo in the film Be Happy. Following this, she turned host for Pati Patni Aur Panga – Jodiyon Ka Reality Check.

2026 saw Bendre portray Mona, a mother whose two young children were kidnapped in the series Raakh, alongside Ali Fazal and Aamir Bashir. The series was inspired by the Ranga–Billa case. India Today's Vineeta Kumar noted, "Sonali delivers a haunting performance as a mother shattered by grief. There are scenes where she seems trapped between memory and acceptance, and Bendre plays those moments with extraordinary honesty."

== Personal life ==
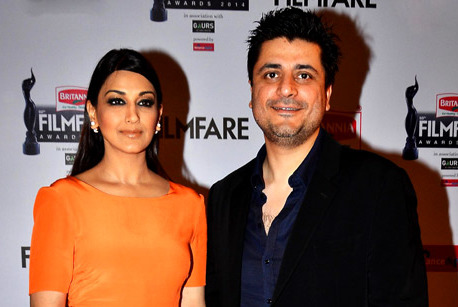
Bendre with her husband Goldie Behl at the 60th Filmfare Awards, 2015

Bendre first met filmmaker Goldie Behl, son of director Ramesh Behl on the sets of her film Naaraaz. Bendre married Behl on 12 November 2002 in Mumbai. They have one child, a son Ranveer born in 2005.

On 4 July 2018, Bendre announced that, she has been diagnosed with a metastatic cancer and was undergoing treatment in a New York City hospital. Despite having stage 4 cancer, the actress became cancer free in 2021.

== Off-screen work ==
When Michael Jackson performed at a concert in Mumbai in 1996, Bendre had the opportunity to welcome Jackson. She was dressed in a traditional Marathi sari and welcomed Jackson by applying the traditional 'tilak' on his forehead. Bendre co-owns Pune Jaguars, a team at The Tennis Premier League. She has ramp walked for Made in India and Pidilite - CPAA charity. She has also been cover model for various magazines including Vogue. Bendre supports a number of causes, including children's education and has been actively supporting cancer survivors. She says, "In whatever capacity I can, I will always be there to help and support the cause of cancer survivors." In 2024, Bendre turned host for a podcast on pet parenting and animal care named, The Happy Pawdcast.

Bendre turned an author with her book named, The Modern Gurukul: My Experiment with Parenting, which talks about her achievements and challenges as a first-time mother. It was released in 2015. In 2025, she authored another book named, The Book of Books.

== Controversy ==
In 1998, Bendre was charged with poaching two blackbucks on the outskirts of Kankani village in Jodhpur district of Rajasthan during the filming of Hum Saath Saath Hain along with co-stars Salman Khan, Saif Ali Khan, Tabu and Neelam Kothari. A lower court charged her with the others under the Wildlife Protection Act, 1972 and the IPC. She had filed a revision petition before a sessions court which discharged her of Section 51 (causing harm to wildlife) of Wildlife Act and both of 147 (punishment for rioting) and 149 (unlawful assembly of persons) of the Indian Penal Code. The Rajasthan State Government then filed a revision petition before the Rajasthan High Court at Jodhpur which again added Section 149 against her, which had been dropped earlier. In December 2012, the Jodhpur court summoned her along with all the accused for commencement of the trial with the revised charges on 4 February 2013. Although Bendre was acquitted in the blackbuck poaching case on 5 April 2018, the Rajasthan High Court issued her with a notice, challenging her acquittal on 11 March 2019.

In 2001, Bendre was arrested by Mumbai Police for wearing thigh-length, lemon yellow kurta with Om and Om Namah Shivay printed on it.

In November 2025, Bendre posted a message on X suggesting that autophagy is a contributor to healing cancer. The message generated many negative comments from physicians, including TheLiverDoc, who claimed she was promoting a scientifically unproven method that could harm others. In her message, Bendre did not mention her success with cancer was the result of world class modern treatment at the Memorial Sloan Kettering Cancer Center in New York. Bendre posted another message on X after Hindustan Times wrote about the controversy.

== Reception and public image ==
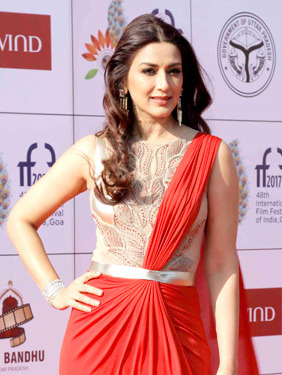
Bendre in 2017

Bendre has often been regarded as one of the most popular and stylish actresses in Indian cinema. Bendre is considered among India's most beautiful actresses. She ranks among the highest-grossing actresses in Indian cinema. Rahul Gangwani of Filmfare termed her "beautiful and fresher than the first rains" and said, "Even though Sonali hasn't appeared on the big screen for a decade now, the craze for her remains unbeaten." India Today termed the actress, "The poster girl of the late 90s". News18 called her the "Golden Girl of Bollywood" and added, "Bendre, renowned for her work in Hindi films and beyond, has carved a niche for herself as a style icon." In a 1999 interview with Rediff.com, she revealed her acting approach. She said,

"I take it as it comes. If I feel strongly about something I voice my opinion, if the director agrees fine, or let him convince me. It comes from having a relationship with the director. You talk out the scene with your directors and your co-stars."

Bendre appeared on Forbes India's Celebrity 100 list of 2016, ranking 99th, with an estimated annual income of ₹65 million (US$670,000). As of 2016, two of her films have grossed more than ₹1 billion (US$10 million). Bendre has said her films, Naaraaz, Zakhm and Sarfarosh, are among the best moments from Indian cinema. Actor Nandamuri Balakrishna has compared her with actress P. Bhanumathi, while praising her performance in Palnati Brahmanayudu. Bendre was placed 36th in FHM India's 100 sexiest women list. In 2018, Bendre was among the most searched personality on Google in Pakistan. In addition to her acting career, Bendre is a celebrity endorser for brands and products such as Nirma, Radha Clothing, Oriflame India, Omega, Real Juice, and Dr. Oetker.

== Work and accolades ==
Bendre is a recipient of several accolades including two Filmfare Awards, four Screen Awards and one Indian Telly Award. Her two Filmfare Awards includes: Lux New Face of the Year for Aag and Sensational Debut for Naaraaz.

== Bibliography ==
- Bendre Behl, Sonali (26 October 2015). The Modern Gurukul: My Experiments with Parenting. Gurgaon: Random House India. ISBN 978-81-8400-759-6.
- Bendre Behl, Sonali (23 April 2025). A Book of Books. Gurugram: Harper Collins. ISBN 978-93-6989-860-2.

== See also ==
- List of Hindi film actresses
- List of Indian actresses
