= Press (TV series) =

British television series

- Genre: Drama
- Written by: Mike Bartlett
- Directed by: Tom Vaughan
- Starring: Charlotte Riley; Ben Chaplin; Priyanga Burford; Brendan Cowell; Paapa Essiedu; Ellie Kendrick; Genevieve Barr; Al Weaver; Shane Zaza; David Suchet; Allison McKenzie
- Music by: Natalie Holt
- Country of origin: United Kingdom
- Original language: English
- No. of series: 1
- No. of episodes: 6

Production
- Executive producers: Faith Penhale; Bethan Jones; Mona Qureshi; Mike Bartlett; Nigel Stafford-Clark; Rebecca Eaton
- Producer: Paul Gilbert
- Cinematography: Kate Reid
- Editors: Mike Clark-Hall; Yan Miles
- Running time: 57 minutes
- Production companies: BBC Studios; Lookout Point Ltd. Masterpiece

Original release
- Network: BBC One
- Release: 6 September – 11 October 2018

Press is a six-part British television drama series first aired on BBC One on 6 September 2018. Created and written by Mike Bartlett, the series depicts two rival British newspapers and the lives of their senior employees. It was broadcast in the United States in October 2019 and December 2020 – January 2021.

The series was cancelled after one series. However, it was remade in India as The Broken News in 2022.

== Cast ==
- Charlotte Riley as Holly Evans, news editor of The Herald
- Ben Chaplin as Duncan Allen, editor of The Post
- Priyanga Burford as Amina Chaudury, editor of The Herald
- Paapa Essiedu as Ed Washburn, reporter at The Post
- Al Weaver as James Edwards, investigative reporter at The Herald
- Ellie Kendrick as Leona Manning-Lynd, reporter at The Herald
- Genevieve Barr as Charlotte Evans, Features Editor at The Herald
- Brendan Cowell as Peter Langly, deputy editor of The Herald
- Shane Zaza as Raz Kane, news editor of The Post
- Susannah Wise as Wendy Bolt, a columnist
- David Suchet as George Emmerson, chairman and CEO of Worldwide News, owners of The Post
- Elliot Levey as Matthew Harper, the Prime Minister
- Dominic Rowan as Joshua West, business tycoon
- Allison McKenzie as Kelly, journalist at The Post

== Episodes ==
| No. | Title | Directed by | Written by | Original release date | U.K. viewers (millions) |
|---|---|---|---|---|---|
| 1 | "Death Knock" | Tom Vaughan | Mike Bartlett | 6 September 2018 | 4.39 |
Herald reporter Holly Evans (Charlotte Riley) is forced to turn to the enemy – Post editor Duncan Allen (Ben Chaplin) – to further her investigation into a hit-and-run. New to The Post, Oxford graduate Ed Washburn (Paapa Essiedu) is tasked with his first "death knock", reporting on a closeted footballer's suicide. Investigative reporter James Edwards (Al Weaver) pursues an MI5 lead, but finds himself blocked by The Herald's weary editor Amina (Priyanga Burford).
| 2 | "Pure" | Tom Vaughan | Mike Bartlett | 13 September 2018 | N/A |
As Duncan's personal life collapses, he sets his sight on stealing Holly from The Herald. With her paper in dire financial straits, Amina considers a controversial new advertising strategy. Holly is frustrated by junior reporter Leona's (Ellie Kendrick) lazy approach to journalism, while Ed is forced to get his hands dirty at a glamorous showbiz party.
| 3 | "Don't Take My Heart, Don't Break My Heart" | Tom Vaughan | Mike Bartlett | 20 September 2018 | N/A |
Holly uncovers a story about a business tycoon turned sexual predator. With her own job in question, Amina is faced with a decision that risks the entire future of The Herald. Ed and Leona find themselves competing for a story in Warwick. Duncan crosses a powerful ally.
| 4 | "Magic" | Tom Vaughan | Mike Bartlett | 27 September 2018 | N/A |
Amina's response to the Joshua West scandal infuriates Holly, and finally drives her into Duncan's grasp. Leona and James chase a story from the morally corrupt Wendy Bolt (Susannah Wise). As the war between Duncan and the Prime Minister escalates, Post owner George Emmerson's (David Suchet) peacemaking efforts fall on deaf ears.
| 5 | "Two Worlds" | Tom Vaughan | Mike Bartlett | 4 October 2018 | N/A |
Holly begins work at The Post and instantly locks horns with Duncan. Ed is faced with his loss of morals when a work experience girl follows him for the day. Amina announces radical changes for The Herald, but will her efforts pull the paper back from the brink?
| 6 | "Resonance" | Tom Vaughan | Mike Bartlett | 11 October 2018 | N/A |
Duncan attempts to spend quality time with his son Fred, but finds it difficult in the face of Sarah's open hostility, and she informs Duncan that she and her boyfriend Max intend for him never to see Fred again. Holly struggles to separate her personal grievances from her professional ambitions. She adds to Duncan's troubles by threatening to publicly expose his relationship with Krystyna, the sex worker with whom he has a longstanding arrangement. In anticipation of the splash, Duncan is forced to explain to Fred that he has been paying for sex, while Krystyna has questions of her own for Holly. James reopens communication with Jon Brooks, an MI5 source who is ready to blow the whistle on the government's Resonance programme. When Amina and Holly learn what the programme entails, they are convinced that the story will be the most important The Herald will ever run. Emmerson presents Duncan with a seemingly impossible task, and Ed is forced to examine his own journalistic ethics, while Holly and Duncan go head to head.

== Reception ==
The review aggregator, Rotten Tomatoes, gave Press a rating of 95%. Sophie Gilbert of The Atlantic called it "fascinating" and "periodically clunky."

Journalists were not impressed with the show, Digital Spy calling it "less realistic than Star Trek." Sean O'Grady of The Independent characterised it as "too cliché-ridden, its characters two-dimensional stereotypes, floating around like dead fish in a tank." The Guardian's Sam Wollaston gave it three stars, but called its picture of the industry "20 years out of date."

== Indian adaptation ==
BBC Studios India produced a Hindi language remake, written by Bartlett and Sambit Mishra, for streaming service ZEE5. It stars Jaideep Ahlawat, Sonali Bendre, Shriya Pilgaonkar, Indraneil Sengupta, Taaruk Raina, Aakash Khurana and Kiran Kumar. The Broken News began streaming on 10 June 2022.
