= Screen Award for Best Female Debut =

Annual film award in India

Screen Awards for Best Female Debut
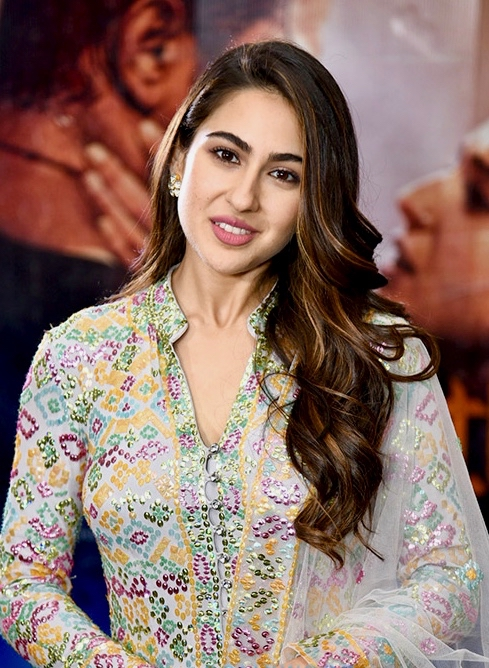
- The 2022 recipient: Sara Ali Khan
- Awarded for: Best Female Debut
- Country: India
- Presented by: Screen
- First award: Sonali Bendre; Aag (1995)
- Currently held by: Sara Ali Khan; Kedarnath (2020)

The Star Screen Award for Most Promising Newcomer – Female is chosen by a distinguished panel of judges from the Indian Bollywood film industry and the winners are announced in January. The first woman to receive this award was Sonali Bendre.

== Winners ==
| Year | Winner | Film | Ref. |
|---|---|---|---|
| 1995 | Sonali Bendre | Aag | |
| 1997 | Priya Gill | Tere Mere Sapne | |
| 1998 | Aishwarya Rai | Aur Pyaar Ho Gaya | |
| 1999 | Preity Zinta | Soldier | |
| 2000 | Nethra Raghuraman | Bhopal Express | |
| 2002 | Gracy Singh | Lagaan | |
| 2003 | Esha Deol | Koi Mere Dil Se Poochhe | |
| 2004 | Lara Dutta | Andaaz | |
| 2005 | Gayatri Joshi | Swades | |
| 2006 | Vidya Balan | Parineeta | |
| 2007 | Kangana Ranaut | Gangster | |
| 2008 | Deepika Padukone | Om Shanti Om | |
| 2009 | Asin | Ghajini | |
| 2010 | Mahie Gill | Dev D | |
| 2011 | Sonakshi Sinha | Dabangg | |
| 2012 | Parineeti Chopra | Ladies VS Ricky Bahl | |
| 2013 | Ileana D'Cruz | Barfi! | |
| 2014 | Aida El-Kashef | Ship of Theseus | |
| 2015 | Patralekha | City Lights | |
| 2016 | Bhumi Pednekar | Dum Laga Ke Haisha | |
| 2017 | Disha Patani | M.S. Dhoni: The Untold Story | |
| 2018 | Zaira Wasim | Dangal | |
| 2019 | Radhika Madan | Pataakha | |
| 2020 | Sara Ali Khan | Kedarnath | |

== See also ==
- Screen Awards
- Bollywood
- Cinema of India
