= Aadesh Shrivastava =

Indian musician (1964-2015)

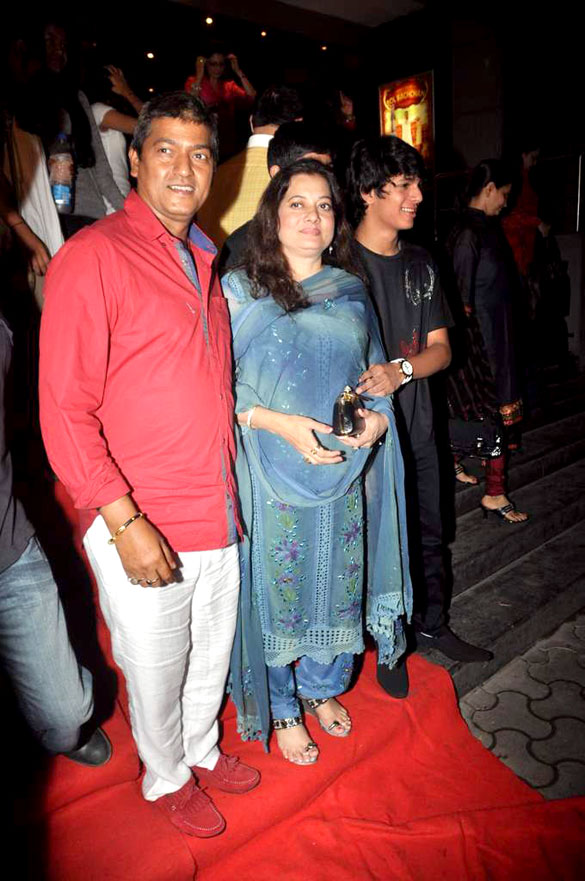
- Shrivastav with Vijeyta Pandit at the special screening of Bol Bachchan 21
- Born: 4 September 1964; Jabalpur, Madhya Pradesh, India
- Died: 5 September 2015 (aged 51); Mumbai, Maharashtra, India
- Occupations: Composer; playback singer; music arranger; music producer
- Years active: 1990–2015
- Spouse: Vijayta Pandit

Aadesh Shrivastava (4 September 1964 – 5 September 2015) was a music composer and playback singer who worked in Indian films. Initially, he had worked as a drummer to music composers including R. D. Burman, Rajesh Roshan before working independently as a music director. Over the course of his career, he had composed music for over 100 Hindi films. Just a day after he turned 51, he died of cancer in Kokilaben Hospital.

== Career ==
Born in a Hindu Kayastha family in Katni, Shrivastava got his first big break with the film Kanyadaan in 1993. Among the singers who sang in this movie, there was Lata Mangeshkar who sang his first song - Oh Sajna Dilbar, a duet with Udit Narayan, which became popular on the radio. But the film and the rest of the songs went unnoticed. The same thing happened with Jaane Tamanna, but he bounced back with Aao Pyaar Karen. One track "Haathon Mein Aa Gaya Jo Kal" was a hit. His other films are Salma Pe Dil Aa Gaya and Shastra. The song "Kya Ada Kya Jalwe Tere Paro", from the film Shastra got him in the limelight once again. In 1995, Shrivastava was a judge on Sa Re Ga Ma Pa.

Shrivastava sang a number of hit songs such as "Sona Sona", "Shava Shava", "Gustakhiyaan" and "Gur Nalon Ishq Mitha". He won accolades for his work in Kunwara, Tarkieb and Shikari in the year 2000. In 2001, his success continued with the movie Bas Itna Sa Khwaab Hai. In 2005, he was a judge on the talent hunt show Sa Re Ga Ma Pa Challenge 2005. The following year, he turned to direction with his short film on child prostitution, Sanaa. In 2009, he made a cameo in the film World Cupp 2011 and returned to television as a judge on Sa Re Ga Ma Pa Challenge 2009. His semi-classical song "Mora Piya" from Raajneeti became a hit in 2010.

On the international front, Shrivastava has collaborated with artists such as Akon, Julia Fordham and Wyclef Jean. Together with Akon, he has launched an India-wide talent search on the website hitlab.com which uses music analysis technology to predict the hit potential of new songs. Other international artists he has collaborated with include Dominic Miller, Shakira and T-Pain.

== Personal life ==
Shrivastava was married to Vijayta Pandit, actress and sister of music composer duo Jatin and Lalit Pandit and actress Sulakshana Pandit in 1990. They have two sons, Anivesh and Avitesh. His elder brother, Chitresh Shrivastava, owned Eyeline Telefilm and Events, the event management company implicated in the Rahat Fateh Ali Khan black money incident. Chitresh died in a car accident in 2011. Aadesh was diagnosed with multiple myeloma in December 2010 and underwent chemotherapy.

== Death ==
It was reported in the media on 31 August 2015 that his cancer had relapsed for the third time since 2010 and that he had been hospitalised for more than a month. He died, in a coma, at 12:30 A.M. IST at Kokilaben Dhirubhai Ambani Hospital & Medical Research Institute, Mumbai, on 5 September 2015, a day after his 51st birthday. He was cremated at Oshiwara crematorium in Mumbai the same day.

== Filmography ==
=== Background music ===
- 2015 Welcome Back
- 2015 I Love New Year
- 2011 Angel
- 2009 Love Khichdi
- 2006 Rehguzar
- 2005 Paheli
- 2004 Garv: Pride and Honour
- 2004 Deewaar - Let's Bring Our Heroes Home
- 2004 Lakeer – Forbidden Lines
- 2003 Zameen
- 2003 Jaal: The Trap
- 2003 Love at Times Square
- 2003 LOC Kargil
- 2002 Yeh Hai Jalwa
- 2002 Humraaz
- 2001 Dil Ne Phir Yaad Kiya
- 2000 Refugee
- 2000 Khauff
- 2000 Badal
- 2000 Champion
- 1999 Haseena Maan Jaayegi
- 1999 Bade Dilwala
- 1998 Major Saab
- 1998 Dushman
- 1997 Border
- 1995 The Don
- 1995 Baazi
- 1995 Suraksha
- 1995 Ram Shastra
- 1994 Imtehan
- 1993 Khalnayak
- 1993 Aadmi
- 1993 Phool Aur Angaar
- 1990 Sailaab

=== As composer ===
- 2015 Dirty Politics
- 2013 Satyagraha
- 2010 Khuda Kasam
- 2010 Raajneeti
- 2009 World Cupp 2011
- 2009 Love Ka Tadka
- 2009 Anubhav
- 2008 Hari Puttar: A Comedy of Terrors
- 2008 Yaariyan
- 2007 Godfather
- 2007 Jahan Jaaeyega Hamen Paaeyega
- 2006 Dil Se Pooch Kidhar Jaana Hai
- 2006 Baabul
- 2006 Rehguzar
- 2006 Husn - Love & Betrayal
- 2006 Alag
- 2006 Saawan... The Love Season
- 2006 Chingaari
- 2006 Sandwich
- 2005 Apaharan
- 2004 Satya Bol
- 2004 Deewaar - Let's Bring Our Heroes Home
- 2004 Dev
- 2003 Baghban
- 2003 Chalte Chalte
- 2003 Kash Aap Hamare Hote
- 2003 Love at Times Square
- 2003 Surya
- 2002 Aankhen
- 2002 Junoon
- 2001 Kabhi Khushi Kabhie Gham
- 2001 Deewaanapan
- 2001 Rehnaa Hai Terre Dil Mein
- 2001 Dil Ne Phir Yaad Kiya
- 2001 Bas Itna Sa Khwaab Hai
- 2001 Uljhan
- 2001 Farz
- 2000 Shikari
- 2000 Joru Ka Ghulam
- 2000 Kunwara
- 2000 Sultaan
- 2000 Tarkieb
- 1999 International Khiladi
- 1999 Lal Baadshah
- 1999 Bade Dilwala
- 1999 Dahek
- 1998 Zulm-O-Sitam
- 1998 Angaaray
- 1998 Major Saab
- 1998 Deewana Hoon Pagal Nahi
- 1997 Bhai Bhai
- 1997 Salma Pe Dil Aa Gaya
- 1997 Humko Ishq Ne Mara
- 1996 Raja Ki Aayegi Baraat
- 1996 Shastra
- 1996 Dil Tera Deewana
- 1996 Apne Dam Par
- 1995 Ram Shastra
- 1995 Veergati
- 1995 Sauda
- 1994 Aao Pyaar Karen
- 1994 Masti
- 1991 Khatra
- 1990 Saheb Jaade (unreleased)

=== Playback singer ===
- 2010 Mummyji-Papaji
- 2010 Raajneeti
- 2008 Hari Puttar: A Comedy of Terrors
- 2007 Jahan Jaaeyega Hamen Paaeyega
- 2006 Dil Se Pooch Kidhar Jaana Hai
- 2006 Baabul
- 2006 Rehguzar
- 2006 Husn - Love & Betrayal
- 2006 Alag
- 2006 Chingaari
- 2004 Dev
- 2003 Baghban
- 2002 Aankhen
- 2000 Joru Ka Ghulam
- 1999 Lal Baadshah
- 1998 Angaaray
- 1996 Apne Dam Par
- 1995 Veergati
- 1990 Agneepath (Song-Alibaba)

== Accolades ==
| Year | Award Ceremony | Category | Film | Song | Result | Reference(s) |
|---|---|---|---|---|---|---|
| 2010 | Mirchi Music Awards | Male Vocalist of The Year | Raajneeti | "Mora Piya" | Nominated | |

== See also ==
- List of Indian film music directors
