= Pyaar Kiya Nahin Jaatha =

Pyaar Kiya Nahi Jaathan
- Directed by: Mahesh Manjrekar
- Written by: Mahesh Manjrekar; Shyam Anuragi
- Produced by: Sagoon Wagh
- Starring: Diwakar Pundir; Sonali Bendre
- Music by: Anand Raj Anand
- Production company: Satyashwami Entertainment Pvt. Ltd.
- Distributed by: SET Pictures
- Release date: 1 January 2003
- Country: India
- Language: Hindi

Pyaar Kiya Nahi Jaathan is a 2003 Hindi Romance film directed by Mahesh Manjrekar. The film features Diwakar Pundir and Sonali Bendre in the lead roles. The film deals with a Love tale.

== Cast ==
- Diwakar Pundir as Vikram 'Vicky' Singh
- Sonali Bendre as Disha
- Nikhil Chinapa as Ravi Pillai
- Navin Nischol as Shekhar Pillai
- Paresh Rawal as Venkat
- Kalpana Pandit as Payal Khurana
- Om Puri as Om Prakash Khurana
- Shivaji Satam as Akram
- Usha Bachani as Anju
- Gurpreet Kaul as Gayetri Singh
- Master Varun as Rahul Singh

== Soundtrack ==
Track #	Song	Artist	Length
1	Unke Labon Pe	Sonu Nigam, Sunidhi Chauhan & Santripi	06:51
2	Pyaar Kiya Nahin Jaata	Sonu Nigam, Anuradha Paudwal & Pt Ajay Pohankar	06:10
3	Aaja Meri Baahon Mein	Sonu Nigam & Saraswati Phukan	04:33
4	Tere Bin Koi Bhi Pal	Atul Kale	04:53
5	Ho Jata Hai Ye Pyaar	Anuradha Paudwal	04:33
6	Kabhi Socha Na Tha Maine	Sonu Nigam & Sonali Vajpayee	05:00
7	Nazrein Mil Jaati Hai	Sonu Nigam, K. S. Chitra	06:07
8	Raaste Yahan	Babul Supriyo, Sadhana Sargam	05:33
