= Shudhu Ekbar Bolo =

- Directed by: Prabhat Roy
- Written by: Prabhat Roy
- Produced by: D. Ramanaidu
- Starring: Prosenjit Chatterjee; Rituparna Sengupta; Tota Roy Chowdhury; Subhasish Mukhopadhyay
- Music by: Babul Bose; Koti
- Production company: Suresh Productions
- Release date: 1999
- Country: India
- Language: Bengali

Shudhu Ekbar Bolo is a 1999 Bengali film directed by Prabhat Roy and produced by Dr. D. Ramanaidu. The film features actors Prosenjit Chatterjee and Rituparna Sengupta in the lead roles. The music of the film was composed by Babul Bose. The movie revolves around the plight of a molested woman and her rehabilitation.

== Cast ==
- Prosenjit Chatterjee
- Rituparna Sengupta
- Deepankar De
- Mouli Ganguly
- Tota Roy Chowdhury
- Subhasish Mukhopadhyay
- Mrinal Mukherjee
- Alakananda Dasgupta
- Ramen Raychowdhury

== Music ==
The film has musical score by Babul Bose.

No	Song title	Singers
1	"Chhoto Chhoto Phoole Phoole"	Babul Supriyo, K. S. Chithra
2	"Kokila Kokila Kuhu Gaye"	Babul Supriyo, K. S. Chithra
3	"Laila Laila"	Babul Supriyo, Srilekha
4	"Chalaki Naa"	Babul Supriyo, K. S. Chithra
5	"Soy Na Je Abichar"	S. P. Balasubrahmanyam
6	"Shudhu Ekbar Balo"	Babul Supriyo, K. S. Chithra
