= Dahek =

Dahek: A Burning Passion
- Directed by: Lateef Binni
- Written by: Lateef Binni; K.K. Raina; Javed Siddiqui (dialogues)
- Produced by: Milan Jhaveri
- Starring: Akshaye Khanna; Sonali Bendre; Danny Dengzongpa
- Cinematography: Rajan Kothari
- Edited by: V. N. Mayekar
- Music by: Aadesh Shrivastava; Anand–Milind
- Release date: 17 December 1999
- Running time: 155 minutes
- Country: India
- Language: Hindi

Dahek: A Burning Passion is a 1999 Indian Hindi-language romance film directed by Lateef Binni. The film stars Akshaye Khanna and Sonali Bendre in the lead roles. The film tells the story of an Interfaith marriage which leads to religious tensions between Hindu and Muslim communities.

== Plot ==
Jabbar Bakshi is the conservative eldest son of the Bakshi household in Bhopal India, and rules the entire family with an iron hand. He finds out his sister, Sabina Bakshi, is in a relationship with Iqbal, and is angered because it is against islamic culture. Sabina and Iqbal elope to Bombay and get married, and decide to stay away from the Bakshi family. Jabbar hunts them down and kills Iqbal with a sword.

Shocked at this brutality at the hands of her brother, Sabina stabs herself with the same sword and dies instantly. Jabbar is arrested by the Bombay Police, and is sentenced to twelve years in prison. His mother is devastated at Sabina's death and decides never to forgive him. After twelve years, Jabbar returns home in Bombay and finds that his past rules are not being observed, and quickly re-asserts his authority, while his mother refuses to have to do anything with him. Jabbar meets his niece, Neelima Bakshi, and is shocked to find her the very image of Sabina.

He finds out that Neelima is in a relationship with a young man, but Neelima, out of fear, denies this. She is indeed in a relationship with Sameer Roshan. When they find out what happened to her aunt, they decide to run away from Bombay and Jabbar. When Jabbar learns of this he is angered, and his anger turns into blind rage when he finds out that Sameer is a Hindu, and he swears to kill them both. The news gets out of a Hindu boy and a Muslim girl eloping, and spreads like wildfire, arousing old flames, and creating a growing rift between the Hindus and the Muslims. Extreme elements on both the Hindu and the Muslim sides decide to get involved, and Jabbar decides that he will hunt them and kill them, and if necessary let history repeat itself. In the end Neelima and Sameer get killed by the rioters, whilst Jabbar realizes his mistake.

== Cast ==
- Akshaye Khanna as Sameer B.Roshan
- Sonali Bendre as Sabina Bakshi / Neelima Bakshi
- Danny Dengzongpa as Jabbar Bakshi
- Dalip Tahil as Bhushan Roshan, Sameer's father.
- Anang Desai as Javed Bakshi, Neelima's father.
- Achala Sachdev as Mrs. Bakshi
- Anjana Mumtaz as Mrs. Roshan, Sameer's mother.
- Achyut Potdar as Hindu Leader
- Anil Nagrath
- K.K.Raina as Naseem Bakshi
- Himani Shivpuri as Mrs. Javed Bakshi
- Tiku Talsania as Wedding guest
- Sharad Kapoor as himself (uncredited cameo)

== Music ==
Lyrics by Majrooh Sultanpuri, Shyam raj and Dev Kohli.

1. "Sawan Barse Tarse Dil" – Sadhana Sargam, Hariharan
2. "Jab Se Tumhe Maine Dekha Sanam" – Udit Narayan, Anuradha Paudwal
3. "Kahaa Kare Koi Churaa Liyaa Dil Ko" – Udit Narayan, Sadhana Sargam
4. "Tujhe Dekhte Hi Ye Dil Kho Gaya Hai" – Alka Yagnik, Kumar Sanu
5. "Meri Jaan Hai Tu" – Alka Yagnik
6. "Aaluvaa Aalovaa, Ho Gori Aajaa Mere Dil Men" – Alka Yagnik, Sunidhi Chauhan, Udit Narayan, Vinod Rathod
7. "Meri Jaan Hai Tu (Male)" – Roop Kumar Rathod
