= Major Saab =

1998 Indian film by Tinnu Anand

- Poster
- Directed by: Tinnu Anand
- Written by: Robin Bhatt; Santhosh Saroj
- Produced by: Amitabh Bachchan
- Starring: Amitabh Bachchan; Ajay Devgn; Sonali Bendre; Nafisa Ali
- Cinematography: Ravi K. Chandran
- Edited by: Prashant Khedekar; Vinod Nayak
- Music by: Songs: Anand Raaj Anand; Aadesh Shrivastava (Sona Sona); Score: Aadesh Shrivastava
- Production company: Amitabh Bachchan Film Corporation
- Release date: 26 June 1998
- Running time: 165 minutes
- Country: India
- Language: Hindi
- Box office: ₹18 crore

Major Saab (transl.: Respected Major) is a 1998 Indian Hindi-language action film directed by Tinnu Anand, starring Amitabh Bachchan, Ajay Devgn, Sonali Bendre, Ashish Vidhyarthi, and Nafisa Ali.

== Plot ==
The plot concerns playboy Virendra "Vir" Pratap Singh. A clause in the will of his wealthy father forces him to enter a military academy in order to inherit the wealth. Vir's repeated attempts to get himself discharged are foiled by Major Jasbir Singh Rana. Then Virendra falls in love with Nisha, the sister of a gangster named Shankar. Shankar wants Nisha to marry the son of his friend Parshuram Bihari and hatches a plot to separate the couple, by pretending to accept Vir, however soon beats him up badly and attempts to break both his arms and legs. After that, the Major then begins training Vir to regain his strength and fight those who wronged him to win Nisha back. Finally, both are accepted by Shankar. However, Bihari kills Shankar and tries to force Nisha to marry his son, but is foiled by the Major and Vir.

== Cast ==
- Amitabh Bachchan as Major Jasbir Singh Rana
- Ajay Devgn as Virendra "Vir" Pratap Singh
- Sonali Bendre as Nisha
- Nafisa Ali as Dr. Priya Rana
- Ashish Vidhyarthi as Shankar
- Mohan Joshi as Parshuram Bihari
- Shahbaaz Khan as Vicky
- Naveen Nischol as Brig. Satish Khurana
- Mushtaq Khan as Hanuman Prasad
- Avtar Gill as Commissioner of Police
- Dinesh Hingoo as Jai Singhaniya (special appearance)
- Kulbhushan Kharbanda as Raja Thakur (guest appearance)
- Siddharth Ray
- Jasbir Thandi as Cadet Amrik singh
- Pradeep Rawat as Subeidar Singh

== Production ==
The film was shot at National Defence Academy, Pune, Australia and Mumbai.

== Release ==
Before the release, Ministry of Defence objected to portrayal of armed forces and National Defence Academy. The makers made all the changes recommended by Ministry of Defence and the film was released on scheduled date of 26 June 1998.

== Reception ==
India Today wrote, "The Indian army has been objecting to this set-in-NDA saga and Bachchan's been justifying factual errors saying it's only a movie. An army major and several cadets spend their time trying to unite two lovers. The script is full of loopholes. The Big B is angry - nothing new. Devgan is sincere and Bendre insipid. Waste of talent." Screen wrote "Tired, tiresome story and script. Too much of Ajay Devgan and too little, too-late of Amitabh Bachchan. Production values uneven. Listless direction".

=== Box office ===
The film was a moderate success at the box office, it earned 18 crore. It was also the 9th highest-grossing film of the year.

== Soundtrack ==
Major Saab

Soundtrack album by Anand Raaj Anand Aadesh Shrivastava
- Released: 20 May 1998
- Genre: Feature film soundtrack
- Label: T-Series

The music is composed by Anand Raaj Anand and Aadesh Shrivastava. Lyrics are penned by Anand Raj Anand and Dev Kohli. Initially Anand Raj Anand wanted to sing the song 'Akeli Na Bazaar Jaya Karo' and 'Pyar Kiya To Nibhana' by himself, but could not due to circumstances, about which he spoke in an interview. However, the whole album gained huge popularity and tracks like "Pyaar Kiya To Nibhana", "Sona Sona" & "Akeli Na Bazaar Jaya Karo" became hit.

=== Track listing ===
No.	Title	Music	Singer(s)	Length
1.	"Pyar Kiya To Nibhana"	Anand Raaj Anand	Udit Narayan, Anuradha Paudwal	05:07
2.	"Sona Sona"	Aadesh Shrivastava	Sonu Nigam, Sudesh Bhosle & Jaspinder Narula	06:47
3.	"Akeli Na Bazar Jaya Karo"	Anand Raaj Anand	Udit Narayan	05:46
4.	"Pyar Karna Hai"	Anand Raaj Anand	Alka Yagnik	04:47
5.	"Tere Pyar Mein"	Anand Raaj Anand	Kumar Sanu	04:35
6.	"Pyar Kiya To Nibhana" (Part 2)	Anand Raj Anand	Udit Narayan, Anuradha Paudwal	03:01
7.	"Deewana Ban"	Anand Raaj Anand	Sudesh Bhonsle	03:15
8.	"Himmat Kabhi Na Todenge"	Anand Raj Anand	Sudesh Bhonsle	00:54
