= Keemat – They Are Back =

1998 film by Sameer Malkan

Keemat
- Film poster
- Directed by: Sameer Malkan
- Screenplay by: Sachin Bhowmick; Madan Joshi (dialogue)
- Story by: Sayed Sultan
- Produced by: Ganesh Jain; Ramesh Jain
- Starring: Akshay Kumar; Saif Ali Khan; Raveena Tandon; Sonali Bendre; Anupam Kher; Shakti Kapoor
- Cinematography: Thomas Xavier
- Edited by: Shirish Kunder
- Music by: Rajesh Roshan
- Production company: Venus Movies
- Distributed by: B4U Films
- Release date: 10 April 1998
- Running time: 162 minutes
- Country: India
- Language: Hindi

Keemat – They Are Back (transl. The Price) is a 1998 Indian Hindi-language action film directed by Sameer Malkan based on a story by Sayed Sultan and produced by brothers Ganesh and Ramesh Jain. It stars Akshay Kumar, Saif Ali Khan, Raveena Tandon and Sonali Bendre, with Ravi Kishen and Anupam Kher in supporting roles. This was the fourth collaboration between Kumar and Khan after hits like Main Khiladi Tu Anari, Yeh Dillagi and Tu Chor Main Sipahi.

== Synopsis ==
Dev and Ajay are brothers, thieves and con men by profession. Sharmili is also a thief who meets Dev and Ajay in a pub, steals their wallets and runs away. Some goons attack her on the way, but Dev and Ajay rescue her. Sharmili is impressed with Dev's fighting skills and believes he is a good human being, so she falls in love with him. Then, Dev and Ajay accidentally kill a young man named Mohan Tripathi. This weighs heavily on their minds, so they find the address of the deceased and travel to his village called Badlapur. They learn that Mohan went to Mumbai to pursue his studies and become a doctor. They meet Mohan's father, Dinanath Tripathi, his mother, Sulakshana, a sister, and Mohan's wife, but are unable to tell them the sad news. So they lie and tell the Tripathis that Mohan is alive, and they are his friends. They decide to stay to assist the Tripathis. In this village Ajay meets Mansi, a village girl, and they fall in love. Sharmili then arrives in Badlapur seeking Dev. Dev also starts loving Sharmili.

Dev and Ajay learn that this village is being terrorized by a tyrannical land-owner named Bhanu Pratap Singh and his men. Bhanu Pratap wants to seize the lands of the poor villagers at any cost, so that he can start building on it. With the course of the story it is revealed that Bhanu Pratap brutally killed his honest elder brother as well as the original land-owner of this village Thakur Suraj Pratap Singh and his wife to seize all the "zamindari" in the past. Dev and Ajay start opposing Bhanu Pratap and his men. Meanwhile, Mohan's wife who is pregnant with Mohan's child, had died during her labour pain because there is no hospital at that village, and the doctor from the other village came late. That time Dev and Ajay reveal the truth of Mohan's death in front of everyone and also confess that they were responsible for his accidental death. Then Dinanath drives them away from the village but they stay there and save the villagers from Bhanu Pratap's torture.

Then Bhanu Pratap finds out with the help of Lala Wajanlal, a greedy money-lender that Ajay has vices of drinking and gambling — and he decides to exploit this in order to separate the two brothers, He creates differences and bitterness between Dev and Ajay and starts taking advantage of the situation. Ajay succumbs to his temptation to gamble and starts losing money. Shortly thereafter he has lost all his money. Humiliated, he steals some gold bangles belonging to the Tripathis and sells them, so that he can continue playing. Dev finds out about this theft, and thus begins the rift between the two brothers that Bhanu has been waiting for. But later it is revealed that Ajay's transformation was a master plan schemed by both Dev and Ajay to deceive Bhanu Pratap and to get money from him by winning his confidence, so that they can use the money to build a hospital in the village which was Dinanath's dream too. When Bhanu Pratap discovers their conspiracy, he attacks them and Dinanath's family with his goons. They fight with the goons, save Dinanath and his family, specially Dinanath's daughter and the poor villagers. Meanwhile, Bhanu Pratap publicly reveals that Mohan was not accidentally killed by Dev and Ajay, it was he who intentionally killed Mohan by hitting him by his car. Dev then kills Bhanu Pratap. Then everyone unites.

== Cast ==
- Akshay Kumar as Dev
- Raveena Tandon as Sharmili
- Saif Ali Khan as Ajay
- Sonali Bendre as Mansi
- Anupam Kher as Dinanath Tripathi
- Dalip Tahil as Bhanu Pratap Singh / Singhania
- Shakti Kapoor as Lala Wajanlal
- Moushmi Chatterjee as Sulakshana (Mohan's mother)
- Avtar Gill as Ajay and Dev's foster father
- Ravi Kishan as Mohan Tripathi
- Johnny Lever as Sub-inspector Ultappan / Veerappan
- Mukesh Khanna as Thakur Suraj Pratap Singh
- Hussain Khan as Victor
- Kiran Javeri (as Mohan's wife)
- Sheetal Suvarna as Sharda (Mohan's sister)

== Production ==
This film was delayed for 2 years. Manisha Koirala was offered the role of Mansi but was replaced by Sonali Bendre. Saif Ali Khan's role was offered before to Ajay Devgn. It was the last film of Akshay Kumar and Raveena Tandon before their breakup. Armaan Kohli was approached but he was busy in Qahar.

== Soundtrack ==
Keemat: They Are Back

Soundtrack album by Rajesh Roshan
- Released: 22 January 1998
- Genre: Feature film soundtrack
- Label: Venus Records & Tapes

The music was directed by Rajesh Roshan. The song "Koi Nahin Tere Jaisa" was a copy of Cotton Eye Joe by Rednex.

#	Title	Singer(s)	Music	Lyrics
1	"O' Meri Chaila"	Alka Yagnik, Kavita Krishnamurthy, Babul Supriyo, Nayan Rathod	Rajesh Roshan	Indeevar
2	"De Diya Dil Piya"	Alisha Chinai, Sonu Nigam	Rajesh Roshan	Indeevar
3	"Koi Nahi Tere Jaisa"	Abhijeet, Udit Narayan, Hema Sardesai	Rajesh Roshan	Indeevar
4	"Nahi Kahi Thi Baat"	Udit Narayan, Alka Yagnik	Rajesh Roshan	Javed Akhtar
5	"Mere Humsafar"	Kumar Sanu, Alka Yagnik	Rajesh Roshan	Indeevar
6	"Gair Se Ankh Ladayee"	Udit Narayan, Anuradha Paudwal	Rajesh Roshan	Indeevar
7	"Yeh Raat Hai"	Altaf Raja, Shweta Shetty	Rajesh Roshan	Maya Govind

== Reception ==
Screen wrote "United Seven Creation’s Keemat, a Venus Music presentation, though not exactly a take-off from Sholay, has a fair amount of similarities with that hit film of the seventies. The similarities, of course, are in the passing and they would not have been jarring had the director Sameer Malkan applied his mind to ingeniously placing them in the context of the film".
