= Tarazu =

1997 film by Vimal Kumar

- Poster
- Directed by: Vimal Kumar
- Written by: S. Khan, Javed
- Produced by: Vinod Malhotra
- Starring: Akshay Kumar; Sonali Bendre
- Music by: Rajesh Roshan
- Release date: 1 August 1997
- Language: Hindi
- Budget: ₹4.25 crore
- Box office: ₹5.85 crore

Tarazu (lit. 'Weighing scale') is an Indian Hindi-language action thriller movie directed by Vimal Kumar and released in 1997 under the banner of Vee Creations. It stars mainly Akshay Kumar, Sonali Bendre, Amrish Puri, Ranjeet and Mohnish Bahl.

== Plot ==
Police Inspector Ram Yadav is an honest, handsome, and incorruptible young man. He lives with his sister-in-law, Shakuntala, and elder brother, Raj. A lovely yet petty thief, Pooja admires Ram so much that she moves into his house in the guise of a maid-servant, and eventually claims that she is to bear his child. Ram, unable to handle this, agrees to marry her. His duties and investigation lead him to suspect the influential Appa Rao. Appa Rao is enraged at Ram, and watches and waits for an opportunity to strike back at him. Janardan, Appa Rao's spoiled and wayward son, initially attempts to pick up a college girl. When she refuses and humiliates him publicly, he retaliates by setting her on fire in broad daylight, in front of several college students. No one is bold enough to stop Janardan, nor even attempt to save the girl. When Ram finds out, he immediately arrests Janardan and holds him in custody. This enrages Appa Rao even more, and he schemes against Ram, a plot so devilish that will turn Ram's ordered life, his faith in the justice, and law of the country, upside down.

== Characters ==
- Akshay Kumar as Inspector Ram Yadav
- Sonali Bendre as Pooja
- Mohnish Bahl as Janardan (Appa Rao's son)
- Ranjeet as Police Commissioner Gaud
- Tej Sapru as Inspector Kulkarni
- Harish Patel as Ibu, Appa Rao’s lawyer
- Kader Khan as Dr. Khan
- Amrish Puri as Appa Rao
- Dinesh Hingoo as Mulchand
- Anil Nagarath as Defence Lawyer Jaswant Singh
- Shashi Sharma as Shakuntala

== Soundtrack ==
Tarazu

Soundtrack album by Rajesh Roshan
- Released: June 1997
- Genre: Feature film soundtrack
- Length: 43:36
- Label: Time Audio

The music was directed by Rajesh Roshan. "Haseena Gori Gori" is copied from In the Summertime by Mungo Jerry. Sameer wrote the lyrics for all songs. Most popular songs in album "Aye Deewane Dil", "Haseena Gori Gori" etc.

#	Title	Singer(s)
1.	"Aye Deewane Dil"	Kumar Sanu, Alka Yagnik
2.	"Haseena Gori Gori"	Udit Narayan, Alka Yagnik
3.	"Chal Ganne Ke Khet Mein"	Ila Arun, Amrish Puri
4.	"Su Su Su Aa Gaya"	Kumar Sanu
5.	"Premee Premee"	Udit Narayan, Kavita Krishnamurthy
6.	"Nazar Na Hate Mere Yaar Se"	Nusrat Fateh Ali Khan
7.	"Mujhe Na Chup Rehna Hai"	Kumar Sanu, Sadhana Sargam
