= Hamara Dil Aapke Paas Hai =

- Poster
- Directed by: Satish Kaushik
- Written by: Jainendra Jain; Bhupati Raja
- Based on: Shudhu Ekbar Bolo
- Produced by: Surinder Kapoor; Boney Kapoor
- Starring: Anil Kapoor; Aishwarya Rai; Sonali Bendre
- Cinematography: Kabir Lal
- Edited by: Chaitanya Tanna
- Music by: Sanjeev–Darshan
- Distributed by: S.K. Film Enterprises
- Release date: 25 August 2000
- Running time: 164 minutes
- Country: India
- Language: Hindi
- Budget: ₹9 crore
- Box office: ₹30.26 crore

Hamara Dil Aapke Paas Hai (My Heart is with You) is a 2000 Indian Hindi-language romantic action drama film directed by Satish Kaushik and produced by Boney Kapoor. The film stars Anil Kapoor, Aishwarya Rai, and Sonali Bendre in the lead roles. It is a remake of the 1999 Bengali film Shudhu Ekbar Bolo.

== Plot ==
Preeti Vyas is a young woman who bravely comes forward as a witness to a heinous assault carried out by Bhavani Choudhry and his men on a poor teacher whose land they wanted. The injured man is helped to the hospital by Preeti and a courteous and brave man called Avinash, who holds strong morals and values.

Preeti's testimony angers the Choudhry family and, as a result, Choudhry's younger brother, Babloo Choudhry rapes her. Subsequently, she is disowned by her family and ostracised by society.

She finds shelter with Avinash, who welcomes her to his home. Avinash lives alone with two young children. He later tells Preeti that the children are the result of a clandestine affair his father had with his secretary. The latter contacted Avinash on her deathbed to beg him to take care of the children. His father flat-out refuses to acknowledge the children. Avinash takes them in and moves out of his parents' house. Preeti works at Avinash's office and helps him take care of the children at home. The two live well together as friends, but this union invites a social opprobrium and strong uproar, and there is no other solution but marriage. They soon fall in love, and Avinash decides to ask Preeti for her hand in marriage. She refuses as she sees that as another favour and kind act, and Avinash respects her decision. Both of them attend a wedding where Preeti sees that her friend is marrying Babloo, the man who had raped her, so Avinash beats him up, and the police arrest Babloo and take him away.

After a year, Avinash's childhood friend Khushi returns from the United States. She tries to win his heart, as she is in love with him. This arouses jealousy in Preeti, and she realizes the depth of her love for Avinash. Avinash's parents never approved of his living arrangement with Preeti and want him to marry Khushi. Avinash's mother eventually approaches Preeti and insists she will die with shame if her son marries a rape victim. She begs Preeti to send Avinash to Khushi. Instead of being outraged at this insulting request, Preeti sheds a few tears and agrees. Avinash moves back to his parents' house and agrees to marry Khushi. But Preeti's friend tells Khushi about what Avinash's mother did. Khushi calls off the wedding and tells Avinash the truth. On the other hand, Babloo comes to Preeti's house to take her and marry her since he wants to erase his mistakes by marrying her, and as nobody wants to marry a rape victim, her parents had no other option but to let her go. Eventually, Avinash shows up, stops Babloo from taking away Preeti, and then confronts everyone, including Preeti's parents, for trying to encourage Preeti to marry Babloo, then beats both Babloo and Bhavani as a punishment. Afterwards, Avinash tells Preeti that it's either her choice to leave him or stay with him, as he will always love her. In the end, Preeti and Avinash are reunited.

== Cast ==
- Anil Kapoor as Avinash
- Aishwarya Rai as Preeti Vyas
- Sonali Bendre as Khushi Malhotra
- Puru Raaj Kumar as Babloo Chaudhry, Bhavani's brother
- Mukesh Rishi as Bhavani Chaudhry
- Anang Desai as Avinash's father
- Anupam Kher as Muthu Pillai
- Johnny Lever as Chatterjee
- Jaspal Bhatti as Balwinder (Balu)
- Himani Shivpuri as Sita Pillai
- Isha Talwar as Preeti's youngest sister
- Tannaz Irani as Babli, Preeti's friend
- Smita Jaykar as Avinash's mother
- Omi Vaidya as Sally
- Saurabh Dubey as Vyas

== Soundtrack ==
Hamara Dil Aapke Paas Hai

Studio album by Sanjeev–Darshan
- Released: 5 July 2000 (India)
- Genre: Feature film soundtrack
- Label: Tips Music Films
- Producer: Sanjeev-Darshan

Sanjeev–Darshan chronology
Deewane (2000)	Hamara Dil Aapke Paas Hai (2000)	Khiladi 420 (2000)

The soundtrack of the film contains eight songs composed by the duo Sanjeev–Darshan with lyrics written by Javed Akhtar. The song "Gham Hai Kyun" is a remake of the song "Kadhala Kadhala" with a slight change in instrumentation from the Tamil movie Avvai Shanmughi.

#	Song	Singer(s)
1.	"Hamara Dil Aapke Paas Hai"	Alka Yagnik & Udit Narayan
2.	"I Love You"	Hema Sardesai, Anil Kapoor, Sonali Bendre
3.	"Tumko Dekha To" (Not in the film)	Alka Yagnik, Kumar Sanu
4.	"Shukriya Shukriya"	Alka Yagnik & Udit Narayan
5.	"Kya Maine Aaj Suna"	Kavita Krishnamurthy, Vinod Rathod
6.	"Gham Hai Kyun"	Udit Narayan
7.	"It's My Family"	Alka Yagnik, Abhijeet Bhattacharya
8.	"Main Teri Hoon"	Alka Yagnik, Abhijeet Bhattacharya

== Reception ==
Taran Adarsh of IndiaFM rated the film four out of five stars and wrote, "On the whole, HAMARA DIL AAPKE PAAS HAI has all it takes to emerge a rewarding experience for its producers, distributors and everyone associated with it. A film that is targeted at the family audience, this one is a must-see!" On the contrary, a critic from Sify wrote that "Unfortunately the film neither entertains nor thrills nor moves you. Sanjeev Darshan's music score is uninspiring and so is everything else". K. N. Vijiyan of the New Straits Times wrote that "In the end, the humour in the film does not come through and becomes irrelevant to the main story. This leaves us with only Anil and Aishwarya".

== Awards ==
Won

- Star Screen Award Best Supporting Actress - Sonali Bendre

Nominated

- Star Screen Award Best Actress - Aishwarya Rai
- Filmfare Best Actress Award - Aishwarya Rai
- Zee Cine Award Best Actress - Aishwarya Rai
