= Diwakar Pundir =

Indian actor in Bollywood and a model (born 1975)

- Born: 11 November 1975 (age 50); Hyderabad, Andhra Pradesh, India
- Occupations: Actor, model

Diwaker Pundir (born 11 November 1975 in Hyderabad) is an Indian actor in Bollywood and a model. He has won the title of Graviera Mister India 1998. He was second runner-up at Mr Intercontinental Contest held in Germany.

He holds Commercial Pilot Licence and was a pilot before joining entertainment industry. His father was an Army officer. He has modelled in many TV commercials of prominent brands such as Lifebuoy soap, Whirlpool refrigerators, Hyundai Verna, Honda Activa, Skoda Rapid and Parle Bakesmith.

== Filmography ==
=== Film ===
Year	Film	Role	Notes
2003	Pyaar Kiya Nahin Jaatha		
2004	King of Bollywood	Rahul	
2005	Pehchaan: The Face of Truth	Prasad Saxena	
2006	Don	Ramesh	
2014	One By Two	Ranjan Sadanah	
2019	99 Songs	Jay's Father	Guest appearance

=== Television ===
Year	Serial	Role	Channel
2003	Crime Patrol (season 1)	Host	Sony TV
2004	Kahani Ghar Ghar Ki	Sambhav Khanna	Star Plus
2005–2006	Reth	Kshom	Zee TV
2006	Sinndoor Tere Naam Ka	Ayushmaan Malhotra	Zee TV
2006–2008	Raavan	Lord Rama	Zee TV
2007–2008	Parrivaar	Shaurya Shergill	Zee TV
2007–2009	Santaan	Parikshit	Star Plus
2009	Ssshhhh...Phir Koi Hai – Nishaan	Varisht Sanyal (Episode 194 & Episode 195)	STAR One
2009–2010	Jaane Pehchaane Se... Ye Ajnabbi	Jay Vardhan Singh	STAR One
2010–2012	Maryada: Lekin Kab Tak?		Star Plus
2012	Sapne Suhane Ladakpan Ke	Akash Kumar Sandhu	Zee TV
2016	Darr Sabko Lagta Hai – Dwaar	Dr. Ajay (Episode 26)	& TV
2016–2018	Karmaphal Daata Shani	Vishnu	Colors TV
2017–2020	Paramavatar Shri Krishna	Lord Shiva	&TV

- Kaali
