= Apne Dam Par =

1996 film by Arshad Khan

- DVD Cover
- Directed by: Arshad Khan
- Produced by: Vijendra Ahuja; D N Joshi
- Starring: Mithun Chakraborty; Shilpa Shirodkar; Aashif Sheikh; Shakti Kapoor; Raza Murad
- Music by: Aadesh Shrivastava
- Release date: 15 March 1996
- Running time: 140 min.
- Language: Hindi

Apne Dam Par is a 1996 Indian Hindi-language action film directed by Arshad Khan, starring Mithun Chakraborty, Shilpa Shirodkar, Govinda, Sonali Bendre, Aasif Sheikh, Shakti Kapoor and Raza Murad.

== Plot ==
The film portrays Ranjit Saxena (Shakti Kapoor) as a wealthy businessman, self-important and proud of his high status. He plans for his sister Sapna (Shilpa Shirodkar) to marry his business partner Verma's (Raza Murad) son Karan (Ashif Sheikh). Unbeknownst to him, however, Sapna has been dating Ram (Mithun Chakraborty), a mechanic of lower social standing. Infuriated, he asks Sapna to leave Ram, but she remains resolute. Ranjit then invites Ram to his mansion, where he is insulted and then bribed to leave Sapna. He refuses, and Verma and Ranjit conspire to kill him. Instead, Sapna stops them, getting herself killed in the process. A crushed Ram vows never to marry, and to take care of his younger brother, Shayam (Irfan Kamal). Many years later, Shayam, now eligible to marry, tells Ram that he is in love with a girl named Divya (Anita Nigam). Ram agrees to the marriage and goes to meet her parents — to discover they are the Saxenas.

== Cast ==
- Mithun Chakraborty as Ram
- Shilpa Shirodkar as Sapna Saxena
- Aasif Sheikh as Karan Verma Verma's Son
- Irfan Kamal as Ram's brother
- Shakti Kapoor as Ranjit Saxena
- Raza Murad as Verma
- Avtar Gill as Diwanji
- Kamaldeep as Chhote sarkar
- Mushtaq Khan as Mamaji
- Kunickaa Sadanand as Mamiji
- Reema Lagoo as Mrs. Saxena
- Shraddha Nigam as Divya Saxena
- Yunus Parvez as Rahim chacha
- Tej Sapru as Pandeyji
- Raju Shrestha as Raju
- Govinda as Rajveer: Raj Khanna
- Sonali Bendre as Preeti
- Ayesha Julka as item number

== Soundtrack ==
The music was composed by Aadesh Shrivastava, with lyrics written by Anwar Sagar, Shyam Raj, Madan Pal, Dev Kohli and Yogesh.

=== Track listing ===
1. "Mujhe Is Tarah Se Dekha Hai Tune" - Udit Narayan, Sadhana Sargam
2. "Dil Deewana Sanam, Aa Lag Jaa Gale" - Udit Narayan, Sapna Mukherjee
3. "Tum Jo Rahoge Bas Khwaab Banke" - Vijeta Pandit, Kumar Sanu
4. "Ek Ladki Pataka, Dil Pe Daal Gayi Daaka" - Abhijeet, Poornima
5. "Teri Meri Aankh Ladi, Pyar Ki Masti Chadi" - Alisha Chinai
6. "Dil Ko Uda Ke Nazare Chura Ke" - Aadesh Shrivastava
7. "Aaraa Hile Chhaparaa Hile, Lachakegi Jab Kamariyaa" - Govinda
