= Diljale =

1996 Indian film by Harry Baweja

- Theatrical release poster
- Directed by: Harry Baweja
- Written by: Karan Razdan
- Produced by: Paramjeet Baweja
- Starring: Ajay Devgn; Madhoo; Sonali Bendre; Parmeet Sethi; Shakti Kapoor; Gulshan Grover; Amrish Puri
- Cinematography: Damodar Naidu
- Edited by: Kuldip Mehan
- Music by: Anu Malik
- Production company: S. P. Creations
- Release date: 27 September 1996
- Running time: 185 minutes
- Country: India
- Language: Hindi
- Box office: ₹158.5 million

Diljale (transl. The burning heart) is a 1996 Indian Hindi-language romantic action film directed by Harry Baweja, with screenplay by Karan Razdan. The film stars Ajay Devgn, Madhoo and Sonali Bendre along with Parmeet Sethi, Shakti Kapoor, Gulshan Grover and Amrish Puri in supporting roles. The film received positive reviews, and earned an India Net Collection of ₹ 15.85 crore. IBNLive included Diljale among its list of "Ajay Devgn's memorable films".

== Plot ==
The film starts with Radhika (Sonali Bendre) being introduced to an Army Captain Ranvir (Parmeet Sethi) by her father, Raja Saab (Shakti Kapoor), an erstwhile king and current politician. Raja Saab tells her that the Captain will be a good husband for her. On the day of the engagement, news breaks of a terrorist attack in a nearby village led by the terrorist, Shaka (Ajay Devgn). Ranvir and Raja Saab leave with a large force to that village. But that turns out to be a ruse as Shaka comes to the venue of the engagement and burns the wedding Mandap. Then, he stares for long at Radhika, who looks at him with hatred, and leaves. Shaka reaches his lair, where he meets his leader, Dara (Amrish Puri) and Shabnam (Madhoo) and the rest of his gang. Dara welcomes him and proclaims him to be Diljale. Shabnam (Madhoo), who loves him, tries to hug him, but Shaka rebuffs it.

Shaka then goes to visit his mother (Farida Jalal), and the story of Shaka is shown in a flashback. Shaka was originally Shyam, a patriotic college student and son of a local village leader. Radhika studies in the same college, and they both fall deeply in love. When Raja Saab tries to usurp all the village land, Shyam's father leads all the villagers against him. Raja Saab bribes a local police officer (Gulshan Grover), who falsely accuses Shyam's father to be a terrorist and kills him in an encounter. When Shyam goes to Raja Saab's home to take revenge, Raja Saab (who knows of their love affair and feels it is below his family's dignity) frames Shyam also as a terrorist and tries to kill him. Shyam escapes, but Radhika, who only sees him threatening her father, berates him and proclaims him a terrorist. Brokenhearted, Shyam joins Dara's group and becomes Shaka. Back in the present time, Ranvir surrounds Shaka at his mother's home but finds himself outnumbered by Shaka's men. Shaka asks him to go away. Ranvir then confronts Radhika and asks her if she knows Shaka from earlier. Under pressure from Raja Saab, she denies knowing Shaka.

The army captures four associates of Dara. To get them freed, Dara asks Shaka, Shabnam and some others to hijack a bus travelling from Vaishno Devi. When Shaka captures them and brings them to a ruined temple, he is shocked to find Radhika (who had gone to Vaishno Devi to pray for Shaka) among the hostages. She confronts him and tells him that he never loved her or the country. Shaka is stung and tells her that he lost everything for her love. She then tells him to release everyone since they are innocent and says that if he loves her, he will do so. He agrees under the condition that she will remain with him. When Shabnam and the others tried to stop this release, Shaka disarms them and releases the hostages and runs away with Radhika. Dara is livid with this betrayal and wants to kill Shaka. Raja Saab meets him and tells him to kill Shaka and release Radhika. Dara agrees, but in return, wants his four associates released and for his entire group to be safely escorted by Raja Saab to Pakistan.

Meanwhile, the corrupt police officer, who killed Shyam's father, tries to kill Shaka, who disarms him. To save himself, the police officer tells the truth to Radhika, who is shocked to see the depth of love which Shaka has for her. Shaka kills the police officer, but is captured by Dara's men. Dara puts both of them under lock and key, but Shabnam releases Shaka. Shaka confronts Dara and asks him not to sell his homeland to politicians like Raja Saab, but Dara orders his men to kill Shaka. Army attack Dara and his men at that very moment. Raja Saab, Dara and his men escape with Radhika in their custody with Shaka and Shabnam in close pursuit. Ranvir finds Raja Saab's son hiding in a corner and finds out the truth about Shyam and Raja Saab.

Dara tells his Pakistani Intelligence handler that they need help crossing the border. Since some Americans are visiting the border and Pakistan doesn't want to be caught supporting terrorists, the Pakistanis decide to mine the border crossing and kill Dara and his men. Dara, Raja Saab and others reach the last border outpost. Raja Saab goes to talk to the Officer of the post to facilitate the escape of Dara and his men. But Shaka has already reached there and is waiting for him in the office. He kills Raja Saab, but Dara and his men escape. When a couple of Dara's men try to kill Radhika, Shabnam kills them and rescues her. Shabnam brings Radhika to Shaka, but they are all confronted by Ranvir. He tells Shaka that he knows the truth and is sorry, but will still have to arrest him. Shaka agrees, but wants to stop Dara and his men from crossing the border since he believes that they still have good in their hearts. Ranvir agrees, and they go in a snowmobile towards the border and reach there before Dara and his men. They see Pakistani soldiers laying mines, but are captured by them.

The Pakistani General tells them they want to kill Dara and his men since they can always create more terrorists. Shaka and Ranvir kill them all and go towards the border. When Shaka goes to stop Dara and his men, Ranvir stops him saying let the terrorists get killed. Shaka says that he wants to kill terrorism, not terrorists. He shouts at Dara to stop, but Dara thinks it is a trick. So Shaka jumps at one of the mines and is blasted. Shocked, Dara asks his men to stop. Shaka wakes up in a hospital to find his mother, Radhika and Ranvir next to him. Ranvir takes him outside, where Dara, Shabnam, and everyone is waiting. Dara hugs him and apologises, and admits that love can defeat anything, even terrorism. He says that they have all surrendered. Shabnam, too, bids him goodbye. Shyam and Radhika hug each other in the backdrop of the Tiranga.

== Cast ==
- Ajay Devgan as Shyam / Shaka
- Madhoo as Shabnam
- Sonali Bendre as Radhika, Raja Saab's daughter.
- Parmeet Sethi as Captain Ranvir
- Shakti Kapoor as Raja Saab, Radhika's father.
- Gulshan Grover as Inspector Yajwendra
- Amrish Puri as Dara
- Farida Jalal as Shyam's mother
- Akash Khurana as Shyam's father
- Rakesh Bedi as Raja Saab's Son
- Arun Bakshi as Laaley
- Himani Shivpuri as Leela, Raja Saab's sister and Radhika's aunt.
- Dayanand Shetty as gunman

== Soundtrack ==
Diljale

Soundtrack album by Anu Malik
- Released: 14 August 1996
- Genre: Feature film soundtrack
- Length: 56:00
- Labels: Big B Music; T-Series

The film has 8 songs. The music composer of this movie is Anu Malik and the lyrics were penned by Javed Akhtar. The song "Mera Mulk Mera Desh" was copied from the Israeli national anthem "Hatikvah", which itself was sampled after the Italian song "La Mantovana".

#	Song	Singer
1.	"Ho Nahin Sakta"	Udit Narayan
2.	"Jiske Aane Se"	Kumar Sanu
3.	"Kuch Tum Beheko"	Udit Narayan, Alka Yagnik
4.	"Mera Mulk Mera Desh"	Kumar Sanu, Aditya Narayan
5.	"Ek Baat Main Apne Dil"	Kumar Sanu, Alka Yagnik
6.	"Shaam Hain Dhuan Dhuan"	Poornima, Ajay Devgan
7.	"Boom Boom"	Shobhana
8.	"Mera Mulk Mera Desh" (Female)	Kavita Krishnamurthy

== Reception ==
Diljale was a landmark in Madhoo's career. Nisha Mehta of The Times of India said, "Not only do I love the heart-warming song Mera Mulk Mera Desh from Diljale but also I like the essence of the film. Ajay Devgn was too good in it."

=== Box office ===
Diljale was released on 27 September 1996 in the budget of (₹5,55,00,000) at 225 screen layouts.

It collected (₹71,00,000) at opening day and at opening weekend it collected (₹1,99,00,000). First week it collected (₹3,52,00,000) and India Net collection were (₹15,85,00,000). Worldwide gross collections were (₹25,85,32,500) and adjusted netgross collections were (₹94,40,04,720). Total net gross collections were (₹9,09,00,000) and film been considered as Hit at Box Office India.
