= Sapoot =

1996 film by Jagdish A. Sharma

- Directed by: Jagdish A. Sharma
- Screenplay by: S. Khan
- Produced by: Jaidev Thackeray (presenter); Rajan Sharma; Satyan Sharma
- Starring: Suniel Shetty; Akshay Kumar; Sonali Bendre; Karisma Kapoor; Prem Chopra; Kader Khan
- Cinematography: Damodar Naidu
- Edited by: Hussain A. Burmawalla
- Music by: Anu Malik
- Production company: Rahul Productions
- Release date: 8 November 1996
- Running time: 160 minutes
- Country: India
- Language: Hindi
- Budget: ₹ 6.50 crore
- Box office: ₹ 11.74 crore

Sapoot (transl. Worthy Son) is a 1996 Indian Hindi-language action-thriller film directed by Jagdish A. Sharma, starring Suniel Shetty, Akshay Kumar, Karishma Kapoor and Sonali Bendre. Other cast members include Kader Khan, Prem Chopra, Johnny Lever, Kiran Kumar, Avtar Gill, Mukesh Rishi, Shalini Kapoor Sagar, Jeetu Verma and Mahavir Shah. Film critic and director Khalid Mohamed described it as a loose adaptation of The Godfather.

== Plot ==
Singhania is a powerful Underworld don, who has two sons. Raj Singhania looks after his business, while his younger brother Prem Singhania is a playboy. Singhania does not deal in drugs, nor does he allow any of his men to deal in narcotics. As a result, his rivals in the crime world, Dhaneshwar and his brother Tejeshwar, set up and murder Singhania. Now Raj Singhania and Prem Singhania must take back their father's criminal empire one step at a time.

== Cast ==
- Akshay Kumar as Inspector Prem Singhania, Raj Singhania's younger brother, Anjali Singhania's elder brother
- Suniel Shetty as Raj Singhania, Prem Singhania's and Anjali Singhania's elder brother
- Karishma Kapoor as Pooja Singhania, Prem Singhania's wife.
- Sonali Bendre as Kajal Singhania, Raj Singhania's wife.
- Johnny Lever as Deva
- Mukesh Rishi as Tejeshwar, Dhaneshwar's younger brother.
- Prem Chopra as Dhaneshwar
- Kiran Kumar as Shamsher
- Mahavir Shah as Kantilal Dalaal / a.k.a. KLD
- Shalini Kapoor Sagar as Anjali Singhania, Raj Singhania's and, Prem Singhania's younger sister and Deva's elder sister.
- Salim Khan as Harish, Anjali's college-mate and love interest.
- Avtar Gill as Masterji Vidyasagar
- Kader Khan as Singhania, Raj Singhania's and , Prem Singhania's & Anjali Singhania's father.
- Jeetu Verma as Maanik, Dhaneshwar's younger son.
- Sanjeev Dabholkar as Dhaneshwar's elder son.
- K. K. Raj as Corrupt Police Inspector Pawar, Tejeshwar's ally.
- Dharmesh Tiwari as Television News Reader

== Soundtrack ==
Sapoot

Soundtrack album by Anu Malik
- Released: 9 October 1996
- Genre: Feature film soundtrack
- Length: 48:50
- Language: Hindi
- Label: T-Series

Soundtrack was composed by Anu Malik. Music was released by T-Series

No.	Title	Lyrics	Singer(s)	Length
1.	"Tera Yeh Dekh Ke Chehra"	Dev Kohli	Kumar Sanu	6:08
2.	"Kajal Kajal"	Dev Kohli	Amit Kumar, Asha Bhosle	8:19
3.	"Main Ladki Ka Deewana"	Dev Kohli	Abhijeet, Runa Rizvi	6:34
4.	"Mumbai Liyo"	Dev Kohli	Remo Fernandes	6:21
5.	"Tukur Tukur (Not in film)"	Dev Kohli	Amit Kumar, Asha Bhosle	5:42
6.	"Kajal Kajal (Not used in the film)"	Dev Kohli	Kumar Sanu, Sadhana Sargam	8:19
7.	"Catch Me If You Can"	Vinay Dave	Sunita Rao	7:27
Total length:				48:50
