= The Don (1995 film) =

- DVD Cover
- Directed by: Farogh Siddique
- Written by: Anand S. Vardhan
- Produced by: Salim
- Starring: Mithun Chakraborty; Sonali Bendre; Jugal Hansraj; Aashif Sheikh; Prem Chopra
- Music by: Songs: Dilip Sen; Sameer Sen; Background Score: Aadesh Shrivastava
- Release date: 28 April 1995
- Running time: 135 minutes
- Language: Hindi

The Don is a 1995 Indian Bengali-language gangster action film directed by Farogh Siddique, produced by Salim, and starring Mithun Chakraborty, Sonali Bendre, Jugal Hansraj, and Aashif Sheikh.

== Plot ==
The Don is the story of a common person, later becoming a Don, who always stands for justice and the poor against all odds and evil minds. His sister is yet to forgive him as he had murdered her fiancée.

== Cast ==
- Mithun Chakraborty as Devendra/Deva (The Don)
- Sonali Bendre as Anita Malik
- Jugal Hansraj as Vijay
- Aasif Sheikh as Nagesh
- Prem Chopra as Commissioner Natwarlal Malik
- Kader Khan as Principal Raghupati, Professor Raghav and Peon Rajaram (Triple roles)
- Sadashiv Amrapurkar as Minister Parashuram
- Arjun Firoz Khan as ACP Nahar Patil
- Raza Murad as Bhujang
- Rana Jung Bahadur as Jagga
- Goga Kapoor as Randhir Bhandari
- Mushtaq Khan as Prajapati
- Kunickaa Sadanand as College Professor Flora
- Guddi Maruti as Hostel Warden Bela

== Soundtrack ==
#	Title	Singer(s)	Lyricist(s)
1	"Dekha Jo Tumhe Yeh Dil"	Kumar Sanu	Deepak Chaudhary
2	"Pum Pum Pum"	Abhijeet	Deepak Chaudhary
3	"The Don"	Mohammed Aziz	Nawab Arzoo
4	"Teri Chaahat Mein Dil Yeh Deewana Hua"	Kumar Sanu, Sadhana Sargam	Anwar Sagar
5	"Dil Ko Jo Maanu To"	Mohammed Aziz, Sadhana Sargam	Faaiz Anwar
6	"Rajaai Maa To Garmi Lage"	Udit Narayan, Kavita Krishnamurthy	Nawab Arzoo
