= Shankar Dada M.B.B.S. =

- Theatrical release poster
- Directed by: Jayanth C. Paranjee
- Story by: Rajkumar Hirani
- Dialogues by: Paruchuri Brothers
- Based on: Munna Bhai M.B.B.S.
- Produced by: Ganesh Raja
- Starring: Chiranjeevi; Sonali Bendre; Srikanth; Girish Karnad; Paresh Rawal
- Cinematography: K. Datthu
- Edited by: Marthand K. Venkatesh
- Music by: Devi Sri Prasad
- Production company: Gemini Film Circuit
- Distributed by: Gemini Film Circuit
- Release date: 15 October 2004
- Running time: 172 minutes
- Country: India
- Language: Telugu

Shankar Dada M.B.B.S. is a 2004 Indian Telugu-language comedy drama film directed by Jayanth C. Paranjee. The film stars Chiranjeevi, Sonali Bendre, Srikanth, Girish Karnad, and Paresh Rawal. It is a remake of the Hindi film Munna Bhai M.B.B.S. (2003). It received positive reviews and was commercially successful, completing a 100-day run at the box office. The film remains Sonali Bendre's last Telugu film till date.

Chiranjeevi and Srikanth both won the Filmfare Award for Best Actor – Telugu and Filmfare Award for Best Supporting Actor – Telugu awards respectively at the South Filmfare Awards in 2005. In 2007, its sequel, Shankar Dada Zindabad was released.

== Plot ==
Shankar Prasad, nicknamed "Shankar Dada" (literally "Rowdy Shankar"), is a bhai or goonda: a crime don in Hyderabad. Given that his father, Satya Prasad, had wished him to be a medical doctor, he creates the faux Sri Satya Prasad Charitable Hospital (named after his father) and pretends to live in accordance with this wish whenever his father and mother visit him in Hyderabad.

One day, however, Shankar's plan goes awry when his father meets an old acquaintance, Dr. Ramalingeswara Rao, and the two decide that Shankar should be married to Ramalingeswara Rao's daughter, Dr. Sunitha "Chitti". At this point, the truth about Shankar is revealed. Ramalingeswara insults Shankar's parents and calls them "fools" for not seeing through Shankar's facade. Shankar's heartbroken parents leave for their village. Shankar, in grief and despair, decides that the only way to redeem himself and to gain revenge for the humiliation suffered by his father at the hands of the spiteful Ramalingeswara is to become a doctor. He decides to go to a medical college to obtain an MBBS degree, the graduate medical degree in South Asia.

With the help of his right-hand man, ATM, and others, Shankar cheats to gain admission to the Hyderabad Institute of Medical Sciences, where he again encounters Ramalingeswara, who is the dean. His success there becomes dependent upon the (coerced) help of faculty member Dr. Mohammad Rafi. While Shankar's skills as a medical doctor and a student are minimal, often infuriating his teachers with his informality, he transforms those around him with the "Jantar Mantar" (heartfelt hug) — a method of comfort taught to Shankar by his mother — and the compassion he shows towards those in need. Despite the school's emphasis on mechanical, impersonal, often bureaucratic relationships between doctors and patients, Shankar constantly seeks to enact more empathetic, almost holistic, regimens. To this end, he defies convention by being friendly with a catatonic child named Sriram as if the kid were able to listen and understand; humiliating bullies at the hospital; effusively thanking a hitherto-underappreciated janitor; and providing a listening ear to patients, encouraging the patients themselves to make changes in their lives for the better.

Ramalingeswara, who perceives all of this as symptoms of chaos, is unable to prevent Shankar's efforts from expanding and gaining ground at his college. Meanwhile, Sunitha, who also works at the college hospital, becomes increasingly fond of Shankar, who, in his turn, becomes unreservedly infatuated with her. Shankar is unaware that Sunitha and his childhood friend "Chitti" are one and the same, but Sunitha hides the detail, pretending to be Chitti's friend. Ramalingeswara tries several times to expel Shankar but is often thwarted by Shankar's wit or the affection with which the others at the college regard Shankar.

Finally, Ramalingeswara requires that Shankar be put to the test to allow him to continue at the college: to disallow cheating, Shankar must answer all questions out loud in front of a panel. Though Shankar prepares, the day before his exam, one of the patients he befriended, a young man, dies, and Shankar is unable to help him in his last moments when he tells him that he doesn't want to die. Shankar's grief and guilt for not being able to help his friend get the better of him, and he quits the exam and agrees to leave the college.

In the moments immediately following Shankar's departure, Sriram miraculously awakens from his vegetative state and says the word "Shankar". Sunitha gives a heartfelt speech wherein she criticizes her father for having banished Shankar, saying that to do so is to banish hope, compassion, love, and happiness from the college. As he is leaving, Shankar discovers that a couple of the doctors at the hospital have been doling out ineffective medicines for their own profit. Using his skills as a Dada (a crime don), Shankar tears down the operation on sight with the help of his friends, exposing the crime to others. Ramalingeswara eventually realizes his folly and thanks Shankar for the great service he did for his hospital. Shankar learns Sunita is really Chitti, and the two get together. Finally, Shankar meets his parents, and they express their pride in him.

== Cast ==
- Chiranjeevi as Shankar Prasad / "Shankar Dada"
- Srikanth as "ATM" / alias Dr. Madhusudhan
- Sonali Bendre as Dr. Sunitha aka "Chitti"
- Paresh Rawal as Dr. J. RamaLingeshwara Rao
- Girish Karnad as Satya Prasad, Shankar Prasad's father
- Vennira Aadai Nirmala as MahaLakshmi, Shankar Prasad's mother
- Sharwanand as patient Vijay
- MS Narayana as Dr. Chidambaram MBBS, FRCS [London]
- Ali as a pickpocketer
- Deepti Nallamothu as Meena
- Surya as Dr. Mohammed Rafi
- Panja Vaishnav Tej as Sriramachandramurti
- Rohit as Thomas, Medical Student, & also a cancer patient
- Bhupinder Singh as "Pandu Dada"
- Chalapathi Rao as an elderly person jogging
- Ahuti Prasad as a corrupt doctor
- Venu Madhav as Shankar's henchman alias Dr. Malhotra
- Narsing Yadav as Shankar's henchman
- Banerjee as a corrupt faculty
- Gautham Raju
- Tirupathi Prakash
- Thotapally Madhu
- Attili Lakshmi
- Duvvasi Mohan
- Rammoorthy
- Karate Kalyani
- Anjala Zaveri in "Chaila Chaila" song (cameo)
- Gauahar Khan in an item number in the song "Naa Pera Kanchan Mala"
- Pawan Kalyan in a cameo appearance

== Production ==
The film was launched on 25 February 2004 at Annapurna Studios.

== Soundtrack ==
Shankar Dada M.B.B.S.

Soundtrack album by Devi Sri Prasad
- Released: 4 September 2004
- Recorded: 2004
- Genre: Feature film soundtrack
- Length: 33:22
- Language: Telugu
- Labels: Supreme Music; Aditya Music
- Producer: Devi Sri Prasad

Devi Sri Prasad chronology
Arya (2004)	Shankar Dada M.B.B.S. (2004)	Mass (2004)

The sound generated at Taramati-Baradri used to be audible to the entire fort of Golkonda because of its strategic location. The producers of Shankar Dada M.B.B.S. obtained special permission to hold this event at such a historical venue. But rain played the spoilt sport and it rained cats and dogs for 3-4 continuous hours in Hyderabad. The organizers changed the venue to Shilpakalavedika, Madhapur.

The celebrities who graced this occasion include K. Raghavendra Rao, D. Ramanaidu, C. Aswini Dutt, KL Narayana, KS Rama Rao, Allu Aravind, Vijaya Bapineedu, Shyam Prasad Reddy, C Kalyan, KC Sekhara Babu, Tagore Madhu, Dil Raju, Ashok Kumar, Chanti Affala, Arjuna Raju, Burugapally Sivarama Krishna, V. V. Vinayak, Sreenu Vaitla, Satya Murthy, Allu Arjun, Ali, Rohit, etc. Raghu Kunche and Bhargavi anchored this event.

After the completion of 50 days, two songs, "Sande Poddu" (performed by Shankar Mahadevan & Kalpana, written by Sahithi) and "Tellarindo Maava" (performed & written by Devi Sri Prasad) were added to the official track list, and the audio was re-released. Both versions were well received. The song “Pattu Pattu” is remade as “Kattu Kattu” in Thirupaachi (2005).

Track list
No.	Title	Lyrics	Singer(s)	Length
1.	"Shankar Dada M.B.B.S."	Chandrabose	Mano, Chiranjeevi (Dialogues), Chorus	5:46
2.	"Naa Pere Kanchanamaala"	Veturi	Malathi, Karthik, Chorus	5:22
3.	"Chaila Chaila"	Devi Sri Prasad	Chiranjeevi (Dialogues), K.K.	6:07
4.	"Ye Jilla"	Chandrabose	Adnan Sami, Kalpana	5:03
5.	"Pattu Pattu"	Sahithi	Manicka Vinayagam & Sumangali	5:11
6.	"Sande Poddu"	Sahithi	Shankar Mahadevan, Kalpana	5:34
Total length:				33:22

== Awards ==
Filmfare Awards South

Year	Category	Recipient(s) and nominee(s)	Result	Ref.
2004	Best Actor – Telugu	Chiranjeevi	Won	
2004	Best Supporting Actor – Telugu	Srikanth	Won	

== Re-release ==
The film was re-released in a spectacular 4K version on 4 November 2023, sold approximately 18,000 tickets in just one day, amassed 23 lakh gross for opening day.
