= Gaddaar (1995 film) =

1995 film by Raam Shetty

- Directed by: Raam Shetty
- Written by: Robin Bhatt; Sujit Sen; Javed Siddiqui
- Produced by: Sunanda R. Shetty
- Starring: Sunil Shetty; Sonali Bendre; Harish Kumar
- Cinematography: Rajan Kinagi
- Edited by: A. Muthu
- Music by: Songs: Nadeem-Shravan; Background Score: Surinder Sodhi
- Distributed by: Shetty Films
- Release date: 9 June 1995
- Running time: 152 minutes
- Country: India
- Language: Hindi
- Budget: ₹2.50 crore
- Box office: ₹4.56 crore

Gaddaar (Traitor) is a 1995 Indian Hindi-language action drama film directed by Deepak Sareen and produced by Sunanda R. Shetty. It stars Sunil Shetty, Sonali Bendre and Harish Kumar in pivotal roles.

== Plot ==
The story is about two close friends who have studied together and spent a lot of time with each other. The real drama stars when the two fall in love with the same girl.

== Cast ==
- Suniel Shetty as Sunil 'Sunny' Gujral
- Sonali Bendre as Priya
- Harish Kumar as Vijay Saxena
- Kiran Kumar as Professor Nag
- Mohan Joshi as Mr. Gujral, Sunny's father.
- Alok Nath as Amar Nath, Priya's father.
- Reema Lagoo as Mrs. Saxena, Vijay's mother.
- Anant Mahadevan as Mr. Saxena, Vijay's father.
- Mahesh Anand as Arjun

== Soundtrack ==
The music was composed by Nadeem-Shravan, The lyrics were penned by Sameer.

#	Title	Singer(s)
1.	"Baraste Paani Ka Maza"	Babul Supriyo, Alka Yagnik
2.	"Tumse Milne Ko"	Kumar Sanu, Alka Yagnik
3.	"Mohabbat Woh Karega"	Kumar Sanu, Udit Narayan, Sadhana Sargam
4.	"Aaj Kal Ki Nahin"	Kumar Sanu, Sonu Nigam
5.	"Beta Apni Maa Se Kabhi" (Female)	Sadhana Sargam
6.	"Beta Apni Maa Se Kabhi" (Male)	Udit Narayan, Roop Kumar Rathod
7.	"Sun To Zara"	Kumar Sanu, Bali Brahmbhatt, Sapna Mukherjee
