= Raakh (TV series) =

- Genre: Crime thriller
- Created by: Anusha Nandakumar; Sandeep Saket
- Written by: Anusha Nandakumar; Sandeep Saket
- Directed by: Prosit Roy; Anusha Nandakumar; Sandeep Saket
- Starring: Ali Fazal; Sonali Bendre; Aamir Bashir; Rakesh Bedi
- Music by: Ajay Jayanthi; Parth Pandya
- Country of origin: India
- Original language: Hindi
- No. of seasons: 1
- No. of episodes: 8

Production
- Cinematography: Saumyananda Sahi
- Editor: Manas Mittal
- Running time: 40–50 minutes
- Production companies: BhaDiPa; EndemolShine India; Gulbadan Talkies

Original release
- Network: Amazon Prime Video
- Release: 12 June 2026

Raakh is a 2026 Hindi-language crime thriller television series created by Anusha Nandakumar, Sandeep Saket, and Prosit Roy. It stars Ali Fazal, Sonali Bendre, Akash Makhija, Rakesh Bedi, Ramandeep Yadav, and Aamir Bashir.

Inspired by the Ranga–Billa case, the series depicts the abduction of two siblings and the police investigation into their disappearance.

== Synopsis ==
In 1978, the disappearance of two teenage siblings shakes New Delhi and devastates a close-knit family. As public fear grows, a determined police officer leads an intensive nationwide manhunt that uncovers a chilling world of violence and cruelty.

== Cast ==
- Ali Fazal as Jayprakash Jatav (JP)
- Sonali Bendre as Mona Arora
- Aamir Bashir as Ashok Arora
- Divya Sharma as Suman Arora
- Vivaan Sharma as Sahil Arora
- Akash Makhija as Babu
- Ramandeep Yadav as Rajjo
- Rakesh Bedi as Ghanshyam
- Anshul Chauhan as Nisar Rizvi
- Dibyendu Bhattacharya as SP Indranil Hajra
- Baharul Islam as Dr. Biswajit Baruah
- Mukund Pal as Pyare Mohan
- Sudhir Sangwan as Ballu Sodhi
- Vivek Tondon as Judge
- Dherendra Kumar Tiwari as Javed Murtaza - Assistant Sub Inspector

== Release ==
The series was released on 12 June 2026 on Amazon Prime Video.

== Critical reception ==
Hollywood Reporter India reviewer Rahul Desai called the series "does well to stay rooted in the anatomy of crime in a pre-technology and early-forensics era." The Indian Express reviewer Shubhra Gupta stated "What’s nice is the way the writers show us that a child can be inherently depraved and violent." NDTV reviewer Tanisha Bhattacharya stated the series boils blood.

Rediff.com reviewer Deepa Gahlot felt "excessive violence is disturbing", but praised Ali Fazal's performance as "one of his best performances so far." Renuka Vyavahare of The Times of India gave 3.5 stars and said that "Raakh is unsettling, disturbing, and difficult to watch at times, but undeniably important viewing." India Today reviewer Vineeta Kumar called the series as "gritty, atmospheric and impeccably performed."

Bollywood Hungama critics rated it 3.5/5 stars and writes that "RAAKH is a hard-hitting and disturbing series that works due to its gripping narrative, atmospheric treatment and strong performances." Anuj Kumar of The Hindu observed that "Raakh’ is an immersive investigative crime drama that sifts through Delhi’s lost innocence."

Vinamra Mathur of Firstpost gave 3 stars out of 5 and said that "Raakh has more meaning than one. Given how we continue to struggle as a country, we are literally burning to the ashes." Nandini Ramnath of Scroll.in writes in her review that "Raakh doesn’t give a proper sense of the time taken to catch the killers, nor of the way in which time itself might have moved more slowly all those decades ago." Rachit Gupta writing for Filmfare gave 4 stars out of 5 and stated that "What makes Raakh truly rare is its genre obscurity. It arrives as a procedural, operates as a thriller and lands as horror."

Cinema Express reviewer BH Harsh rated the series 4/5 stars and writes "the makers also show resistance at many moments." The New Indian Express reviewer rated the series 4 out off 5 stars.

The Quint reviewer felt the series "doesn’t give enough to the viewers to chew on." Kabir Singh Bhandari of The Free Press Journal stated that the series "is not an easy watch."

== Controversy ==
Raakh generated controversy after viewers and commentators noted that several characters inspired by real people in the 1978 Ranga–Billa case had their religious and caste identities changed in the adaptation. Among the reported changes were the replacement of the Sikh perpetrators with fictional Hindu characters, the portrayal of a fictional Muslim police officer in place of a real Hindu officer, and the replacement of journalist Prabha Dutt and civilian Babulal with fictional Muslim characters. Critics argued that these changes altered the historical record, while others defended them as creative liberties typical of fictional adaptations.
