= Akash Khurana =

Indian actor, screenwriter, director, author and entrepreneur

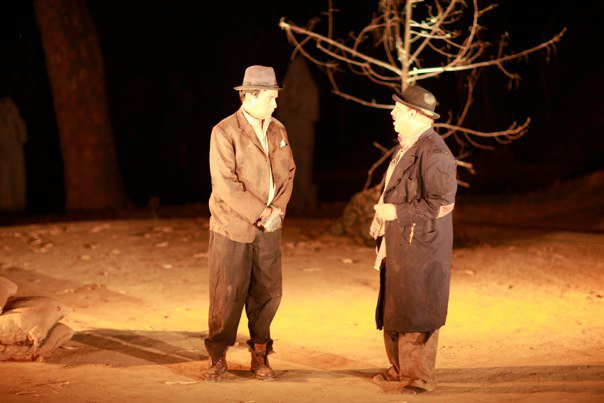
- Khurana (right) playing Vladimir in Waiting for Godot (opposite Benjamin Gilani's Estragon) in 2009 at The Doon School, Dehradun
- Occupations: Actor, screenwriter, director, author, theatre artist, entrepreneur
- Spouse: Meera Khurana
- Children: Akarsh Khurana, Adhaar Khurana

Akash Khurana is an Indian actor, screenwriter, director, author, theatre artist and entrepreneur.

His first screen appearance was in Shyam Benegal's Kalyug. He has appeared in nearly 60 films, including Ardh Satya, Saaransh, Naam, Beta, Saudagar, Sarfarosh, Company and Barfii.

He has written over 20 screen plays, including Aashiqui and Baazigar. He won the Nandi Award for Special Jury for the film Dr. Ambedkar (1992).

== Early life and background ==
Khurana did his schooling at St. Francis de Sales school in Nagpur. He graduated from the National Institute of Technology, Rourkela (Rourkela, Odisha, India) as a mechanical engineer. He then obtained an MBA degree from XLRI – Xavier School of Management (Jamshedpur, Jharkhand, India). Later he obtained an M.Phil. degree and a Ph.D. in Social Sciences from Tata Institute of Social Sciences (Mumbai, India), where he has been a visiting faculty member since 1995.

== Filmography ==
Key
†	Denotes films that have not yet been released

=== Actor ===
Year	Film	Role
1981	Kalyug	Sandeep Raj
1983	Ardh Satya	Khanna - Mill Owner
1984	Party	Agashe
1984	Saaransh	Chief Minister Shashikant
1985	Trikal	Renato
1985	Janam	Asghar
1986	Naam	Aftab Ahmed
1987	Jalwa	Inspector Hosi Wadia
1987	Kaash	Doctor Anil - Ritesh's friend
1988	Mere Baad	
1988	Falak	Jamuna Das
1988	Kabzaa	Arun Date
1988	Tamas (film)	Dr. Kapoor
1989	Jurrat	Police Commissioner
1989	Daddy (TV movie)	
1990	Jurm	Ritesh Nandy
1991	Vishkanya	Trilokchand (Sonal's dad)
1991	Saudagar	Police Commander
1992	Maarg	Abhay
1992	Beta	Prem
1992	Raat	Mr. Sharma
1992	Antham	
1992	Drohi	Chief Minister
1993	Phool	Rajeshwar Dayal
1993	Gunaah	Mahender Singh
1993	Roop Ki Rani Choron Ka Raja	D'souza
1995	Milan	Raja's brother
1995	Prem	SP Verma
1995	Bombay (Tamil film)	
1996	Jaan	
1996	Diljale	Shyam's Father
1999	Sarfarosh	Ajay's Father
2000	Badal	Satyaprakash, Chief Minister
2001	One 2 Ka 4	Commissioner of Police
2002	Filhaal...	Mr. Sheth
2002	Company	Vilas Pandit
2002	Encounter: The Killing	Sudhakar Rao
2002	Zindagi Khoobsoorat Hai	
2003	Koi... Mil Gaya	Catholic School Principal
2006	Taxi No. 9211	Shyam Mittal
2006	Banaras	Dr. Gopal Bhattacharya
2006	Krrish	Catholic School Principal
2006	Yun Hota Toh Kya Hota	
2006	Sarhad Paar	Bade Miyan
2008	Black & White	Wazir Shah - Rajya Sabha Member
2009	Ladies Special (TV series)	Vipul Joshi
2009	Kurbaan	Ahuja
2010	Aakrosh	
2011	Always Kabhi Kabhi	Principal Elton Phillips
2012	Barfi!	Barfi's Father
2013	David	Iqbal Ghani
2013	Once Upon a Time in Mumbai Dobaara!	DK (Film Director)
2014	Real FM	Saloni's Father
2014	UnIndian	Ashok
2014	Humshakals	Mr. Singhania; Ashok's father
2018	Karwaan	Prakash Rajpurohit
2020	Sadak 2	Psychiatrist
2021	Rashmi Rocket	Dr. Ejaz Qureshi
2022	The Broken News	Ketan Kedia
2024	Sector 36	Mr Bassi
2025	Dhurandhar	Devavrat Kapoor, Minister of External Affairs
2026	Dhurandhar: The Revenge	Devavrat Kapoor, Minister of External Affairs

=== Writer ===
Year	Films
2014	Kaanchi: The Unbreakable
2010	Aakrosh
2008	Black & White
2006	Sarhad Paar
2001	Yeh Raaste Hain Pyaar Ke
1999	Daag: The Fire
1999	Agar Tum Na Aate
1999	Kartoos
1999	Silsila Hai Pyar Ka
1998	Angaaray
1998	Duplicate
1998	Yeh Aashiqui Meri
1997	Betaabi (screenplay / story)
1996	Chaahat (written by)
	Sanam O Sanam
1995	Milan
1993	Baazigar (written by)
1992	Drohi (dialogue)
1991	Do Pal
1991	Saathi (dialogue / screenplay / story)
1990	Aashiqui (dialogue / screenplay / story)
	Swayam

== Television ==
=== Actor ===
- Satyajit Ray Presents
- Sara Jahan Hamara
- Guftagoo
- Tamas
- C. Rajagopalachari Stories
- Faisla
- Dhadkan
- Asha
- Rishtey
- Untitled
- Raahein
- Kuch Ret Kuch Pani
- Aakrosh
- Ladies Special'
- 24 Season 2
- Humshakals
- Leila
- Mai: A Mother's Rage

=== Director ===
- Front Page on Doordarshan
- Kuch Ret Kuch Pani on Channel 9 Gold
- Magal on Sun TV (2007–2011)
- The River of Love (2021 film)

=== Writer ===
- Gulmohur (West)
- Kismat
- America...Amerika
- Kabhie Kabhie
- Viruddh
- Dil Hai Hindustani
- Kuch Ret Kuch Pani

== Theatre ==
=== Actor ===
Year	Play	Playwright	Director	Refs
1970s	The Miser	Molière	K. Janardhan	
1970s	Equus	Peter Schaffer	K. Janardhan	
1970s	Adhe Adhure	Mohan Rakesh	K. Janardhan	
1970s	The Memorandum	Vaclav Havel	Anmol Vellani	
1970s	The Unknown General	Rene de Obaldia	Sunil Shanbag	
1970s	Abe Bewaqoof	Slavomir Mrozek	Satyadev Dubey	
1980s	Aur Tota Bola	C'shekhar Kambhar	Satyadev Dubey	
1980s	Aah	Vijay Tendulkar	Satyadev Dubey	
1980s	Ajnabi	Albert Camus	Satyadev Dubey	
1980s	Ooljulool	A. Rangachari	Satyadev Dubey	
1980s	Don Juan in Hell	Bernard Shaw	Satyadev Dubey	
1980s	Chowkidar	Harold Pinter	Sunil Shanbag/Akash Khurana	
1980s	Circus	Slavomir Mrozek	Sunil Shanbag	
1980s	Mat Yaad Dila	Vijay Tendulkar	Akash Khurana	
1980s	Arms and the Man	Bernard Shaw	Naseeruddin Shah	
1990s	Julius Caesar	Shakespeare	Naseeruddin Shah	
1990s	The Caine Mutiny Court Martial	Herman Wouk	Naseeruddin Shah	
1990s	Waiting for Godot	Samuel Beckett	Benjamin Gilani	
1990s	Ramu aur Maalik	Milan Kundera	Sunil Shanbag	
2000s	A Life in the Theatre	David Mamet	Zubin Driver	
2000s	Women in Waiting, Men on the Line	Various Poets	Akash and Akarsh Khurana	
2000s	A Special Bond	Ruskin Bond	Akarsh Khurana	
2000s	Antigone	Jean Anouilh	Satyadev Dubey	
2000s	Blackbird	David Harrower	Akarsh Khurana	
2010s	Super 8	Various	Akarsh Khurana	
2010s	Our Town	Thornton Wilder	Akash Khurana	
2010s	Stories in a Song	Vikram Phukan	Sunil Shanbag	
2010s	Tuesdays with Morrie	Mitch Albom	Meera Khurana	

=== Director ===
Play	Playwright
Chowkidar	Harold Pinter
Mat Yaad Dila	Vijay Tendulkar
Women in Waiting, Men on the Line	Various Poets
Our Town	Thornton Wilder
A Friend's Story	Vijay Tendulkar
The Hound of the Baskervilles	Steven Canny & John Nicholson
Under the Gypsy Moon	Sarat Chandra Chattopadhyaya/Akash Khurana
