= Anahat (film) =

- Promotional theatrical poster
- Directed by: Amol Palekar
- Produced by: Rohit Sharma; Amol Palekar
- Starring: Anant Nag; Sonali Bendre; Deepti Naval
- Cinematography: Debu Deodhar
- Release date: 2003
- Running time: 90 minutes
- Country: India
- Language: Marathi

Anahat (Unhurt) is a 2003 Marathi film directed by Amol Palekar and starring Anant Nag, Sonali Bendre and Deepti Naval. Anahat won the Best Artistic Direction award at the World Film Festival of Bangkok, in 2003.

Anahat was screened as the opening film of the 2003 Indian Panorama, an International film festival. It was also screened at Jerusalem Film Festival in 2011 along with five other movies.

== Plot ==
Anahat is set in the 10th century AD in Shravasti, the capital of the Kingdom of Malla. It revolves around two individuals — the king of Malla (Anant Nag), who is unable to father an heir, and the Queen, Sheelavati (Sonali Bendre), who is forced to choose a potent mate for one night. While the queen is ordered to merely produce an heir through the ancient practise of Niyoga, she enjoys the sexual act without hurting her husband and comes to realise what her life is missing (in terms of sexual fulfillment).

== Cast ==
- Anant Nag as king of Malla
- Sonali Bendre as Sheelavati, the Queen of Malla
- Deepti Naval as Mahattarika
- Snigdha Akolkar
- Tanushree Dutta

== Reception ==
Pankaj Upadhyaya of Rediff wrote, "In the final reckoning, it's a simple story simply told. The camera works efficiently. The actors, for the most part, have just been allowed to be themselves".
