= Ajeeb Daastaan Hai Ye =

Indian television series

- Genre: Romance; Drama
- Developed by: Ekta Kapoor
- Written by: Anil Nagpal
- Directed by: Mujammil Desai; Santram Varma; Lalit Marathe
- Creative director: Tanushree Dasgupta
- Opening theme: "Ajeeb Dastaan Hai Yeh"
- Composer: Lalit Sen
- Country of origin: India
- Original language: Hindi
- No. of seasons: 1
- No. of episodes: 107

Production
- Producers: Ekta Kapoor; Shobha Kapoor
- Production location: Mumbai
- Camera setup: Multi-camera
- Running time: 24 minutes
- Production company: Balaji Telefilms

Original release
- Network: Life OK
- Release: 7 October 2014 – 6 March 2015

Ajeeb Dastaan Hai Yeh is an Indian Hindi-language television soap opera that aired on Life OK. It was produced by Ekta Kapoor under her banner Balaji Telefilms. The series was dubbed in English and aired on Star Life as An Unusual Tale.

The show was the television debut of Sonali Bendre in the fiction genre. The title of the show Ajeeb Dastaan Hai Yeh is inspired by the title song of the 1960 Hindi-language film Dil Apna Aur Preet Parai.

== Plot ==
Shobha Sachdev (Sonali Bendre) is a middle-aged housewife who is married to a politician, Samarth Sachdev (Harsh Chhaya). The couple has two little children and a seemingly happy marriage until Shobha discovers that her husband is having an affair, and is involved in corruption. She is completely distraught and unsure of what to expect from life. She decides to pursue a career for the benefit of her children and her husband's innocent family.

Her new journey to be independent goes through major ups and downs, whilst she tries to figure out her seemingly arrogant, yet mysterious boss, Vikram Ahuja (Apurva Agnihotri). He inspires her to create an identity for herself and not rely on the one her husband has left her with. As she gets to know the man Vikram is, they form an unnamed, yet a divine bond. As her kids fall in love with the man too, their relationship becomes strong and pure.

== Cast ==
=== Main ===
- Sonali Bendre as Shobha Sachdev
- Apurva Agnihotri as Vikram Ahuja
- Harsh Chhaya as Samarth Sachdev, Shobha's ex-husband

=== Recurring ===
- Vivana Singh as Sarika Sachdev/Madhura Kashyap
- Alka Amin as Sharda Sachdev, Samarth's mother
- Devyansh Tapuriah as Rehaan
- Kreesha Shah as Jia
- Ruchi Savarn as Garima Ganguly
- Sandeep Rajora as Tarun
- Anurag Sharma as Sandeep
- Mihika Verma as Shikha
- Rushad Rana as Saurabh Ganguly
- Gaurav Nanda as Anil
- Prashant Chawla as Sanjay Ganguly
- Garima Kapoor as Riddhima
- Preeti Gupta as Shobha's friend

== Reception ==
Initially, the show was seen as a fresh take on the saas-bahu relationship seen in Indian television serials. Explaining why the show was taken off air, the show's co-creator Ekta Kapoor said that audiences were not ready for progressive shows that showed a married woman choosing to move on even after her husband mistreats her. In another interview in 2017, Ekta Kapoor said that the show was poorly received as the idea of a woman in a bad marriage moving out and leaving her husband did not match the general accepted thought process of a family despite the show's depiction of reality.
