= Duplicate (1998 film) =

1998 Indian film by Mahesh Bhatt

- Film poster
- Directed by: Mahesh Bhatt
- Written by: Robin Bhatt; Akash Khurana; Javed Siddiqi
- Produced by: Yash Johar
- Starring: Shah Rukh Khan; Juhi Chawla; Sonali Bendre
- Cinematography: Sameer Arya
- Edited by: Waman Bhonsle
- Music by: Songs: Anu Malik; Score: Louis Banks
- Production company: Dharma Productions
- Distributed by: Eros International
- Release date: 8 May 1998
- Running time: 166 minutes
- Country: India
- Language: Hindi
- Budget: ₹9.50 crore
- Box office: ₹21.49 crore

Duplicate is a 1998 Indian Hindi-language action comedy film directed by Mahesh Bhatt. It stars Shah Rukh Khan in a dual role, with Juhi Chawla and Sonali Bendre playing female lead roles. The film portrays Shah Rukh Khan playing a dual role as Bablu, an aspiring chef, and Manu, a notorious gangster. It marked Khan's first of many collaborations with Dharma Productions.

At the 43rd Filmfare Awards, the film received 2 nominations – Best Villain (Khan) and Best Lyricist (Javed Akhtar for "Mere Mehboob Mere Sanam"). The film has been described as a remake of the 1935 American film The Whole Town's Talking.

== Plot ==
Bablu, a bubbly and childish young man, is an aspiring chef who always prays to God whenever he gets the chance. Manu, who is a very big gangster and a doppelganger of Bablu, is meanwhile getting chased by the police. He eventually gets caught, but swiftly gets his way out of getting arrested.

On his way to a job interview, Bablu meets Sonia Kapoor, a charming and beautiful hotel catering manager, in a cab. They argue over who should get the cab, but eventually figure out that they are going to the same place; Bablu is going to a job interview with Sonia. Bablu eventually gets hired as the head chef at the hotel after showing off his cooking skills and meets the hotel's owner who has a crush on Sonia, even though Sonia doesn't reciprocate his feelings. Throughout the film, the manager tries his hardest to get Bablu and Sonia broken up, and Bablu fired. As Sonia and Bablu continue to work with each other, Bablu falls in love with her.

One day, when Bablu takes Sonia out for lunch trying to express his feelings, he gets arrested after the police mistake him for Manu. Bablu is able to prove his true identity, but not before Manu hears of his duplicate. Bablu is given an identity card by the police and goes home happily only to be met by Manu and his goons. Manu tries to kill Bablu and take his place, but Manu threatens him that they have to switch places if he wants him and his loved ones to survive, forcing Bablu to unwillingly accept.

Due to his womanizing nature, Manu begins to flirt with Sonia who notices that his behavior has changed drastically, and rejects Manu. Manu becomes extremely frustrated and continues to try and flirt with her. At the same time, Manu's girlfriend Lily also tries to flirt with Bablu, after falling in love with his "new" personality. Bablu rejects her as well since he is madly in love with Sonia. Regardless, Bablu starts teaching all of Manu's gang members, including Lily, about morals.

One day, Manu arrives at Bablu's house, still posing as him, and sees that the light is on. He thinks that the real Bablu is inside and starts calling out for him, but is surprised to see that it is Bablu's mother. She thinks Bablu is drunk since Manu who is posing as Bablu is calling out for Bablu, so she scolds him and tells him to go to sleep. Soon Bablu and Manu switch back since the police have given up on looking for Manu. Manu decides he wants to kill Bablu and calls Bablu's mother and Sonia to an abandoned and rundown location so that Sonia and Bablu can get married, trapping them. Meanwhile, Bablu realizes he has lost a lot of his money, and thinking Manu did it, locates him, falling into Manu's trap as well. At the same exact time, the police have tracked down who they think is Manu, but is really Bablu, and follow him to the rundown location. The police arrive before Bablu, but Sonia intervenes and tells them they have the incorrect person, thinking Manu is Bablu. All of a sudden, the real Bablu arrives at the location and tells the police that the other man is Manu. Causing more confusion, Manu reappears and says he is Bablu. However, Bablu's mom says that Bablu was a big wrestler before he came to Mumbai and she says whoever pulls her to their respective side is the real Bablu. Bablu and Manu begin pulling, and when Bablu sees his mother in pain, he lets go, letting Manu win. Manu believes this proves he is "Bablu", thinking now the real Bablu will get shot and killed, but Bablu's mother reveals that the real Bablu would never let his mother be in pain. Manu reveals that he has a gun, and tries shooting Bablu, but before he can do that, Lily shoots him dead from behind. She reveals that because Bablu taught her how to be a good person, she decided to save the day. Regardless of Lily being in love with Bablu, Bablu and Sonia get married, ending the film on a good note.

== Cast ==
- Shahrukh Khan as Bablu Chaudhary / Manu Dada (dual role)
- Juhi Chawla as Sonia Kapoor, Bablu's love interest.
- Sonali Bendre as Lily, Manu's love interest.
- Mohnish Behl as Ravi Lamba, Sonia's Hotel Manager.
- Farida Jalal as Mrs. "Bebe" Chaudhary, Bablu's mother.
- Tiku Talsania as Inspector R. K. Thakur
- Gulshan Grover as Shalaku
- Sharat Saxena as Dhingra
- Naushaad Abbas as a henchman
- Rana Jung Bahadur as Gappa
- Kajol as Simran Singh, the girl on the station (uncredited cameo)
- Vishwajeet Pradhan as Tony (special appearance)

== Soundtrack ==
Duplicate

Soundtrack album by Anu Malik
- Genre: Feature film soundtrack
- Length: 46:37
- Label: Saregama

The music was composed by Anu Malik and the lyrics were penned by Javed Akhtar. The songs, "Mere Mehboob Mere Sanam", "Ek Shararat Hone Ko Hai" and "Kathai Aankhon Wali" were popular ones from the album.

| # | Title | Singer(s) | Length |
|---|---|---|---|
| 1. | "Mere Mehboob Mere Sanam" | Alka Yagnik & Udit Narayan | 06:59 |
| 2. | "Kathai Aankhon Wali" | Kumar Sanu | 07:13 |
| 3. | "Ek Shararat Hone Ko Hai" | Kavita Krishnamurthy & Kumar Sanu | 05:54 |
| 4. | "Ladna Jhagadna" | Kavita Krishnamurthy & Abhijeet Bhattacharya | 06:28 |
| 5. | "Wah Ji Wah" | Kumar Sanu | 06:04 |
| 6. | "Tum Nahin Jaana" | Alka Yagnik, Shankar Mahadevan & Udit Narayan | 06:48 |

== Box office ==
Released on 230 screens in India, Duplicate opened to a decent response, but could not sustain well due to negative reception among the audience and proved to be a commercial failure with losses amounting to ₹1.5 crore.

== Awards and nominations ==
=== 1999 Filmfare Awards ===
| Category | Nominees | Result |
|---|---|---|
| Best Villain | Shah Rukh Khan | Nominated |
| Best Lyricist | Javed Akhtar for "Mere Mehboob Mere Sanam" | Nominated |

=== Bollywood Movie Awards ===
| Year | Category | Film | Result |
|---|---|---|---|
| 1999 | Most Sensational Actress | Juhi Chawla | Won |

=== Zee Cine Awards ===
| Year | Category | Film | Result |
|---|---|---|---|
| 1999 | Zee Cine Award for Best Actor – Female | Juhi Chawla | Nominated |
