= Hindustan Ke Hunarbaaz =

2012 televised children's talent show in India

- Genre: Talent show
- Country of origin: India
- Original language: Hindi
- No. of seasons: 1
- No. of episodes: 41

Production
- Producer: Big Synergy Productions
- Cinematography: Nitesh Choudhary
- Running time: 1 hr including commercials
- Production company: Big Synergy

Original release
- Network: Life OK
- Release: 22 October – 16 November 2012

Hindustan Ke Hunarbaaz is a talent show for children airing on Life OK which premiered on 22 October 2012 and went off air on 16 November 2012.
