= Aag (1994 film) =

1994 Indian film by K. Ravi Shankar

- Release poster
- Directed by: K. Ravi Shankar
- Written by: Satish Jain
- Story by: Su. Thirunavukkarasar
- Based on: Maruthu Pandi by Manoj Kumar
- Produced by: A. Krishnamurthy
- Starring: Govinda; Shilpa Shetty; Sonali Bendre
- Cinematography: K. V. Ramanna
- Music by: Dilip Sen-Sameer Sen
- Production company: Tina Films International
- Release date: 12 August 1994
- Running time: 139 minutes
- Country: India
- Language: Hindi
- Budget: ₹ 1.85 crore
- Box office: ₹ 5.51 crore

Aag (transl. Fire) is a 1994 Indian Hindi-language action drama film directed by K. Ravi Shankar and produced by A. Krishnamurthy. It stars Govinda, Shilpa Shetty and debutant Sonali Bendre and was remake of Tamil film Maruthu Pandi.

== Plot summary ==
Orphaned at a very young age, Raju lives a poor lifestyle with his unmarried sister, Laxmi, in India. Both are of marriageable age. One day, Raju meets an attractive fellow-collegian, Parul, and after a few encounters with another fellow-collegian, Bobby, both fall in love. But Parul's uncle, Jagpal, has already arranged her marriage with Police Inspector Suryadev Singh. When Suryadev finds out that Parul is refusing to marry him, he arrests Raju on a charge of murder, holds him in a cell, and beats him mercilessly.

Laxmi, quite dramatically, takes a gun from a police officer and helps Raju escape so as to prevent Parul from being forcibly married to Suryadev. They do manage to arrive in time, only to find out that Parul has consumed poison and killed herself. Raju is beside himself with rage, but is captured by the police, and watches helplessly as Parul is cremated. His horrors have not ended as Suryadev raped Laxmi and left her in a mentally unstable condition.

Raju takes Laxmi with him to a small village, where he hides her from other people as she has become visibly pregnant, and changes his name to Birju. He meets with a lovely village belle by the name of Bijli, who wants to marry him. What Raju does not know is that Bijli is a plainclothes policewoman, Inspector Barkha Sharma, who has been assigned to arrest him at any cost. She does confront him, and he confesses to killing Parul's uncle, Jagpal, and Barkha calls for reinforcements to escort Raju to jail. The Inspector in charge of the reinforcements is none other than Suryadev — and this time, he is determined to finish Raju once and for all.

Raju runs to fight the police, takes a bullet to his Knee, and gets incapacitated by Suryadev. Suryadev forces the villages to write against Raju, but Chhote Thakur Madhav Sings writes against Suryadev instead. So, the police start thrashing him and also torture the villagers. Sometime later, Raju wakes up and starts fighting the police again. But he had to leave the fight when his sister was critically sick. Chhote Thakur, his sister, and brother-in-law are beaten by the police while the police search the whole village. The villagers thwart their attempt using Marbles and chilli powder. By dawn, they shot a running Raju, but it was revealed to be Chhote Thakur. Meanwhile, Raju comes and beats Suryadev black and blue, who had dragged Raju's sister to the middle of the road. All the women help Laxmi to give birth, but she eventually dies. Raju is captured again, and Suryadev says he will let him perform the funeral rites of his sister and then die.

Raju initiates the funeral and, using a scythe, cuts Suryadev, thereby killing him. Other police come and arrest him while it is said that they will wait until his release for marriage with Barkha Sharma.

== Cast ==
- Govinda as Raju/Birju
- Shilpa Shetty as Bijli / Inspector Barkha Sharma
- Sonali Bendre as Parul
- Prajakta Dighe as Laxmi, sister of Birju
- Shakti Kapoor as Inspector Suryadev Singh
- Mohnish Behl as Bobby
- Gulshan Grover as Chhote Thakur Madhav Singh
- Kader Khan as Tolaram
- Sadashiv Amrapurkar as Bholaram
- Goga Kapoor as Thakur Madan Singh
- Avtar Gill as Jagpal
- Raju Shrestha as Parul's Brother
- Vikas Anand as Police Commissioner Mohan Kumar
- Suhas Joshi as Shalini, Tolaram and Bholaram's mother
- Viju Khote as Village Dr Damodar
- Dinesh Hingoo as Muthukrishnan Swami

== Soundtrack ==
Aag

Studio album by Dilip Sen-Sameer Sen

All songs were written by Sameer Anjaan and composed by Dilip Sen-Sameer Sen

#	Song title	Singer
1	"Yeh Kanya Kunwari Hai"	Sudesh Bhosle, Hariharan, Alka Yagnik
2	"Ankhon Mein Tum Ho"	Kumar Sanu, Alka Yagnik
3	"Main Tera Majnu"	Kumar Sanu, Poornima
4	"Muskura Ke Jiyo Zindagi"	Kumar Sanu
5	"Angiya Mein Ang Na Samaye"	Poornima
6	"Tera Kya Lagta Hai"	Sonu Nigam, Alka Yagnik, Ila Arun
