= The Broken News =

- Genre: Drama
- Based on: Press by Mike Bartlett
- Written by: Mike Bartlett; Sambit Mishra
- Directed by: Vinay Waikul
- Starring: Jaideep Ahlawat; Sonali Bendre; Shriya Pilgaonkar; Indraneil Sengupta; Taaruk Raina; Aakash Khurana; Kiran Kumar
- Music by: Aditya Pushkaran
- Country of origin: India
- Original language: Hindi
- No. of seasons: 2
- No. of episodes: 16

Production
- Producer: Sameer Gogate
- Cinematography: Harendra Singh
- Editor: Gaurav Agarwal
- Running time: 500
- Production company: BBC Studios India

Original release
- Release: 10 June 2022 – present

The Broken News is a 2022 Indian Hindi-language newsroom drama web series directed by Vinay Waikul on ZEE5 starring Jaideep Ahlawat, Sonali Bendre, Shriya Pilgaonkar, Jay Upadhyay, Indraneil Sengupta, Taaruk Raina, Aakash Khurana and Kiran Kumar. It is a remake of the British series Press. It is written by Mike Bartlett, who created the original, and Sambit Mishra. The series released on 10 June 2022 on ZEE5.

Following the success of the first season, ZEE5 renewed the series for a second season in March 2023. The second season premiered on May 3, 2024.

== Series overview ==
Season	Episodes	Originally released		
Season	Episodes	First released	Last released	Network
1	8	June 10, 2022	10 June 2022	ZEE5
2	8	May 3, 2024		ZEE5

=== Season 1 ===
Awaaz Bharati is a news outlet headed by Amina Qureshi, an editor who prioritizes journalistic ethics. The channel faces financial challenges. Josh 24/7, headed by Dipankar Sanyal, is India's highest-rated channel according to Television Rating Point (TRPs), but if focuses on sensationalist coverage and has been critized for insufficient factchecking. The channel prioritizes things viewership and ratings, which contributes to its commercial success. Radha Bhargava works between these two competing approaches. The series follows the personal and professional lives of the characters as they navigate work life balance, ambition and integrity, under the pressure of the news cycle in a changing media industry.

=== Season 2 ===
After surviving the agonising time in prison, Radha’s new approach towards journalism leaves everyone including Amina questioning her motives. Ready to make new enemies and avenge old ones, Radha’s approach create conflicts with Dipankar leading to a battle between Awaaz Bharati and Josh 24x7, ensued by a new investor, that will rewrite the rules of ethical journalism.

== Episodes ==
No. overall	Episode	Title	Date of Broadcast
1	1	"Happy Birthday"	10 June 2022
2	2	"Facts Vs Accusations"	10 June 2022
3	3	"Gagged"	10 June 2022
4	4	"The Akhil Kapoor Scandal"	10 June 2022
5	5	"Apne Dum Par"	10 June 2022
6	6	"Ulti Ganga"	10 June 2022
7	7	"Operation Umbrella"	10 June 2022
8	8	"Satyagraha"	10 June 2022
9	1	"Urband Terrorist"	3 May 2024
10	2	"Sher Dil Shahenshah"	3 May 2024
11	3	"Radha Bhargav Kisi Se Nahi Darti"	3 May 2024
12	4	"Suo Mynona"	3 May 2024
13	5	"Journalist Hai Saaley"	3 May 2024
14	6	"Activist Radha Bhargav"	3 May 2024
15	7	"Sach Ki Shraddhanjali"	3 May 2024
16	8	"Ummeed Ki Kiran"	3 May 2024

== Cast ==
- Jaideep Ahlawat as Dipankar Sanyal, head of Josh 24x7
- Sonali Bendre as Ameena Qureshi, Radha's boss and head of Awaaz Bharati
- Shriya Pilgaonkar as Radha Bhargava
- Indraneil Sengupta as Pankaj Awasthi
- Taaruk Raina as Anuj Saxena, a journalist at Josh 24x7
- Dinkar Sharma as Nandan Balachandran,
- Aakash Khurana as Ketan Kedia
- Kiran Kumar as Radhe Shyam Bansal
- Sanjeeta Bhattacharya as Juhi Shergill, a journalist at Awaaz Bharati
- Mugdha Godse as Gulnaaz Khan
- Faisal Rashid as Kamal Wadia, a journalist at Awaaz Bharati
- Jay Upadhyay as Praful Gupta
- Jaywant Wadkar as Bhau
- Sukhmani Sadana as Arunima Sanyal
- Shreya Mehta as Lisa
- Mohan Kapur as Anurag Bhatia
- Sharad Kapoor as Akhil Kapoor
- Deepali Pansare as Nazneen Balsara

== Reception ==
=== Season 1 ===
Rashmi Vasudeva from Deccan Herald wrote "'The Broken News' review: Newsroom drama made entertaining". Johnson Thomas from Filmibeat wrote "Sonali Bendre, Shriya Pilgaonkar & Jaideep Ahlawat In Top Form". Saibal Chatterjee from NDTV stated "Sonali Bendre Brings Remarkable Maturity, Jaideep Ahlawat Is In Splendid Form ". Shubhra Gupta from Indian Express wrote "Sonali Bendre, Jaideep Ahlawat show is more of a crime thriller than a cautionary tale". Chirag Shehgal from News18 states "Jaideep Alhawat is as Brilliant as Ever, Sonali Bendre Deserved More Screen Time". Namrata Thakker from Rediff wrote "With solid actors headlining the cast and supporting actors lending good support, The Broken News is a good weekend binge watch".

=== Season 2 ===
The season drew praise from critics across board.

The Indian Express stated, "...it borrows bravely from current events, and tells us how all ‘news’ can be ‘spun’ so that a particular point-of-view is cemented." Scroll.in remarked, "The newsroom drama is occasionally cracking. The corporate manipulations, boardroom priorities and the nexus with elected authorities are neatly woven in." News 18 awarded the show 4 out of 5 stars.

Saibal Chatterjee in his review for NDTV rated the show 2.5 out of 5 and stated, "Not that all of it hits home with equal force, but parts of The Broken News Season 2 do strike a chord and provoke thought."

Anuj Kumar in The Hindu calls it "An incisive X-ray of the news business Driven by convincing performances and compelling drama" saying that "director Vinay Waikul’s series exposes the moral ambiguities that dot the mediascape."

Sana Farzeen in India Today says "Watching ‘The Broken News 2’ feels like switching on a news channel and hearing the daily bulletin. There are words like 'urban naxal', 'propaganda', 'libtards', and 'social media manipulation' being thrown around during casual conversations." saying that "Spawn on different sides, they continue to fight the biggest battle between truth and ratings in the second season."
