= Arasatchi =

2004 film by N. Maharajan

- DVD cover
- Directed by: N. Maharajan
- Written by: N. Maharajan
- Produced by: Murali Manohar; Haresh Vikram Vijayakumar
- Starring: Arjun; Lara Dutta
- Cinematography: S. Saravanan
- Edited by: B. S. Vasu; Saleem
- Music by: Harris Jayaraj
- Production company: Cee (I)TV Entertainment(p)ltd
- Distributed by: Mars Entertainment Group; Motion Pictures Partners
- Release date: 17 September 2004
- Running time: 154 minutes
- Country: India
- Language: Tamil

Arasatchi (transl. Government authority) (Note: Spelt onscreen as Arasaktchi.) is a 2004 Indian Tamil-language vigilante action film directed by N. Maharajan, starring Arjun and Lara Dutta, alongside an ensemble cast. This is the Tamil debut of Dutta. The film was released on 17 September 2004.

== Plot ==
Brammanadham, a lawyer who defends rapists and murderers, is killed by a cricket ball hit by Siddharth. Siddharth is the General Manager of a five-star hotel owned by Rajesh. Rajesh's daughter, Lara, returns from abroad to join her father's hotel, but only as a trainee under the macho Siddharth. Soon, Lara falls in love with Siddharth.

The time for duets begins. Lara's friend, Prakash, is a public cause campaigner. His efforts lead to a raid on a brothel, resulting in a minister's arrest. The minister's goons attack Prakash, and Siddharth witnesses the crime. However, Siddharth refuses to testify, prompting Lara to leave him. Janakiraman defends the killer and gets him acquitted. Siddharth then kills Janakiraman. Major Vishwanath, a military officer, witnesses the murder and postpones his heart surgery to ensure the killer is caught. Siddharth now explains why he is targeting lawyers who defend criminals. Vishwanath ultimately abandons his mission.

Next, Karunakaran defends a rapist, and he is also killed. The turn then comes for advocate Ashok Mehta, who arrives from Delhi. The twist is that Ashok is Siddharth's brother-in-law, as Ashok's wife is Siddharth's long-lost sister. The story now shifts to the brother-sister relationship.

In the end, Ashok is shot dead by Siddharth on the court premises. The police open fire, and bystanders form a human wall and are shot. Siddharth tells the TV crew how his mission has now spread to the masses.

== Cast ==
- Arjun as Siddharth
- Lara Dutta as Lara
- Vivek as Hotel Assistant Manager
- S. Ve. Shekher as Rajesh, Lara's father
- Karan as Prakash
- Vindhya as Menaka, Prakash's wife
- Nassar as Major Vishwanath
- Raghuvaran as Ashok Mehta (Siddharth's brother-in-law)
- Anandaraj as Advocate Brammanadham
- Charan Raj as Advocate Janakiraman
- P. Vasu as Saravanaperumal, Siddharth's father
- Kavitha as Lakshmi, Siddharth's mother
- Abitha as Swetha, Siddharth's sister
- Manivannan as Father of rapist
- Devan as Karunakaran
- Rajan P. Dev as Contractor Muthupandi
- Mansoor Ali Khan as Inspector India Ganesan
- Ajay Rathnam as Inspector Karthikeyan
- Vaiyapuri as Soosai
- M. N. Nambiar as Iyer
- Ponnambalam as Muthupandi's henchman
- Uma as Gayathri
- Delhi Ganesh as Sivaraman
- Mahanadi Shankar as Goon
- Vijay Krishnaraj as Home Minister N. Gramani, M. A.
- Bose Venkat as Police Inspector
- Riya Sen as Bar Dancer in item song (Iruvadhu Vayasu)
- Perarasu as reporter (uncredited)

== Production ==
After the success of Vallarasu, Maharajan was supposed to direct Vijayakanth in another project but later got dropped and Maharajan went on to remake Vallarasu in Hindi as Indian with Sunny Deol. Meanwhile, Maharajan announced his next project Arasatchi with Arjun playing the lead role. Miss Universe 2000 Lara Dutta made her acting debut in Tamil with this film. The filming was held at Le Royal Meridian Hotel, Chennai, and the songs were picturised at locations in London, New Zealand and Canada. The song "Mughalai Mughalai" choreographed by Raju Sundaram was shot at London especially at London Central Tower.

During the making of the film, music composer Harris Jayaraj fell out with the director. Hence, the song "Ippadiyea Vittu" was not shot, and it appears only in soundtrack version The film was completed in 2003 but got delayed due to financial problems and finally released in 2004; in between production delays, Maharajan finished Anjaneya with Ajith.

== Controversy ==
Before release, a poster featuring the tagline "When Justice Fails" created controversy, which caused a lawyer to file a case citing that the film would portray lawyers in bad light. However the case was sorted after the high court dismissed the petition.

== Soundtrack ==
The music was composed by Harris Jayaraj.

Track listing
No.	Title	Lyrics	Singer(s)	Length
1.	"Arakonathil Aarambam"	Thamarai	Sunitha Sarathy	5:32
2.	"Chant of Arasaktchi"	Viveka	Karthik, Chandran	2:32
3.	"Ippadiyea Vittu Vittu"	Na. Muthukumar	Shankar Mahadevan, Swarnalatha	5:37
4.	"Irubadhu Vayadhu"	Viveka	Harini, Febi Mani	4:20
5.	"Kozhaa Puttu Penney"	Snehan	Sriram, Srilekha Parthasarathy	4:39
6.	"O Muhalai Muhalai"	Thamarai	Harish Raghavendra, Harini	6:04
Total length:				28:44

== Critical reception ==
Malini Mannath wrote for Chennai Online, "A knot had potential and would have been ideal for the 'action king' if only the screenplay had been etched more carefully, the narration tightened, with more 'action' given to Arjun than to factors like tanker-blasts, etc." Sify wrote, "Arjun does his usual song and fights convincingly while Lara Dutta is too loud and is there only for glamour and songs. The film looks out-dated as it has been years in the making". Visual Dasan of Kalki called the film "above average".
