= List of Hindi films of 2001 =

Bollywood film's released in 2001

This is a list of films produced by the Bollywood film industry based in Mumbai in 2001.

== Highest-grossing films ==
The top 10 highest worldwide grossing Bollywood films of 2001 are as follows:

No.	Title	Director	Production company	Worldwide gross
1	Kabhi Khushi Kabhie Gham	Karan Johar	Dharma Productions	₹135.53 crore (US$28.72 million)
2	Gadar: Ek Prem Katha	Anil Sharma	Zee Studios	₹133.13 crore (US$28.21 million)
3	Lagaan	Ashutosh Gowariker	Aamir Khan Productions	₹65.97 crore (US$13.98 million)
4	Indian	N. Maharajan	Sunny Super Sound	₹42.61 crore (US$9.03 million)
5	Dil Chahta Hai	Farhan Akhtar	Excel Entertainment	₹39.72 crore (US$8.42 million)
6	Chori Chori Chupke Chupke	Abbas–Mustan	Eros International	₹37.51 crore (US$7.95 million)
7	Ek Rishtaa: The Bond of Love	Suneel Darshan	Shree Krishna International	₹36.50 crore (US$7.74 million)
8	Yaadein	Subhash Ghai	Mukta Arts	₹34.59 crore (US$7.33 million)
9	Lajja	Rajkumar Santoshi	Rajkumar Santoshi Productions	₹34.29 crore (US$7.27 million)
10	Jodi No.1	David Dhawan	Time Magnetics	₹34.13 crore (US$7.23 million)

== List of released films ==
Title	Director	Cast	Genre
Aamdani Atthanni Kharcha Rupaiya	K. Raghavendra Rao	Govinda, Juhi Chawla, Chandrachur Singh, Tabu, Isha Koppikar, Vinay Anand, Johnny Lever	Family drama
Aashiq	Indra Kumar	Bobby Deol, Karisma Kapoor, Anupam Kher, Johnny Lever, Rahul Dev	Action comedy
Abhay	Suresh Krissna	Kamal Haasan, Manisha Koirala, Raveena Tandon	Thriller
Ajnabee	Abbas Mustan	Bobby Deol, Akshay Kumar, Kareena Kapoor, Bipasha Basu, Johnny Lever	Thriller, suspense, crime
Aks	Rakeysh Omprakash Mehra	Amitabh Bachchan, Raveena Tandon, Manoj Bajpai, Nandita Das	Thriller, horror
Albela	Deepak Sareen	Govinda, Aishwarya Rai, Namrata Shirodkar, Jackie Shroff	Romance
Aśoka	Santosh Sivan	Shah Rukh Khan, Ajith Kumar, Kareena Kapoor, Hrishita Bhatt	History
Bas Itna Sa Khwaab Hai	Goldie Behl	Abhishek Bachchan, Rani Mukerji, Sushmita Sen, Jackie Shroff	Drama, romance, social
Be-Lagaam	Ram Lakhan	Aryan Vaid, Pramod Moutho, Tanveer Zaidi	Action
Bengal Tiger	Adarsh Jain	Mithun Chakraborty, Shakti Kapoor	Action
Bhairav	T. L. V. Prasad	Mithun Chakraborty	
Censor	Dev Anand		Drama
Chandni Bar	Madhur Bhandarkar	Suhas Palshikar, Tabu, Atul Kulkarni. Rajpal Yadav	Drama
Chhupa Rustam: A Musical Thriller	Aziz Sejawal	Sanjay Kapoor, Mamta Kulkarni, Manisha Koirala	Thriller
Chori Chori Chupke Chupke	Abbas Mustan	Salman Khan, Rani Mukerji, Preity Zinta	Drama, romance, musical, social
Daman	Kalpana Lajmi	Raveena Tandon, Raima Sen, Sanjay Suri, Sayaji Shinde	Drama
Dattak	Gul Bahar Singh	Rajit Kapoor, Anjan Srivastav, A. K. Hangal, Kruttika Desai	Drama
Deewaanapan	Ashu Trikha	Arjun Rampal, Diya Mirza, Vikas Sethi, Om Puri, Kabir Sadanand	Drama, romance
Dil Chahta Hai	Farhan Akhtar	Aamir Khan, Saif Ali Khan, Akshaye Khanna, Preity Zinta, Sonali Kulkarni, Dimple Kapadia	Drama, comedy, romance, musical
Dil Ne Phir Yaad Kiya	C. L. Rawal	Govinda, Tabu, Pooja Batra	Romance
Ehsaas: The Feeling	Mahesh Manjrekar	Sunil Shetty, Neha	Drama
Ek Rishtaa: The Bond of Love	Suneel Darshan	Sharat Saxena, Mohnish Bahl, Simone Singh, Amitabh Bachchan, Raakhee Gulzar, Akshay Kumar, Karisma Kapoor, Juhi Chawla, Shakti Kapoor, Ashish Vidyarthi	Family drama
Farz	Raj Kanwar	Sunny Deol, Preity Zinta, Om Puri, Jackie Shroff, Dara Singh	Action, romance
Gadar: Ek Prem Katha	Anil Sharma	Sunny Deol, Amisha Patel, Amrish Puri, Lillete Dubey	Drama, war, romance, action
Grahan	Shashilal K. Nair	Jackie Shroff, Manisha Koirala, Anupama Verma	Romance
Hadh: Life on the Edge of Death	Thampi Kannanthanam	Jackie Shroff, Sharad Kapoor, Ayesha Jhulka	
Hum Ho Gaye Aapke	Agathiyan	Fardeen Khan, Reema Sen, Apoorva Agnihotri	Romance
Indian	N. Maharajan	Sunny Deol, Shilpa Shetty, Danny Denzongpa	Action
Ittefaq	Sanjay Khanna	Sunil Shetty, Pooja Batra	Action, drama, thriller
Jodi No.1	David Dhawan	Sanjay Dutt, Govinda, Twinkle Khanna, Monica Bedi	Comedy
Kabhi Khushi Kabhie Gham	Karan Johar	Amitabh Bachchan, Jaya Bachchan, Shah Rukh Khan, Kajol, Hrithik Roshan, Kareena Kapoor	Drama, romance, family
Kasam	Shibu Mitra	Sunny Deol, Chunky Pandey	Action
Kasoor	Vikram Bhatt	Lisa Ray, Aftab Shivdasani, Divya Dutta	Thriller
Kuch Khatti Kuch Meethi	Rahul Rawail	Sunil Shetty, Kajol, Rishi Kapoor, Rati Agnihotri	Comedy, drama
Kyo Kii Main Jhuth Nahin Bolta	David Dhawan	Govinda, Sushmita Sen, Anupam Kher, Ajith Vachani, Shahbaz Khan, Mohnish Bahl	Comedy, romance
Lagaan: Once Upon a Time in India	Ashutosh Gowariker	Aamir Khan, Gracy Singh, Rachel Shelley, Toby Stephens, Amin Gazi, Pradeep Rawat	Drama, musical, social
Lajja	Rajkumar Santoshi	Manisha Koirala, Rekha, Madhuri Dixit, Jackie Shroff, Anil Kapoor, Mahima Chaudhry, Ajay Devgn	Drama, romance, musical, crime
Love Ke Liye Kuchh Bhi Karega	E. Niwas	Saif Ali Khan, Fardeen Khan, Aftab Shivdasani, Twinkle Khanna, Sonali Bendre	Comedy
Love You Hamesha	Kailash Surendranath	Rishma Malik, Rohit Bal, Sonali Bendre	
Maya	Digivijay Singh	Nitya Shetty, Mita Vasisht, Anant Nag	Drama
Mitti			
Moksha	Ashok Mehta	Manisha Koirala, Arjun Rampal	Drama
Monsoon Wedding	Mira Nair	Naseeruddin Shah, Lillete Dubey, Shefali Shah, Vasundhara Das, Vijay Raaz, Tillotama Shome, Randeep Hooda, Rajat Kapoor, Jas Arora	Comedy, drama
Mujhe Kucch Kehna Hai	Satish Kaushik	Tusshar Kapoor, Kareena Kapoor, Rinke Khanna	Comedy
Mujhe Meri Biwi Se Bachaao	Harry Baweja	Naseeruddin Shah, Rekha, Arshad Warsi, Suman Ranganathan	Comedy, family
Nayak	S. Shankar	Anil Kapoor, Rani Mukerji, Pooja Batra, Paresh Rawal, Amrish Puri, Johnny Lever	Drama
Officer	Naeem Sha	Sunil Shetty, Raveena Tandon, Danny Denzongpa, Tej Sapru	Action
One 2 Ka 4	Shashilal K. Nair	Shah Rukh Khan, Juhi Chawla, Madhur Mittal, Jackie Shroff, Nirmal Pandey, Dilip Joshi	Action, romance
Paagalpan	Aruna Irani	Karan Nath, Aarti Agarwal, Farhan Khan	Romance
Pyaar Ishq Aur Mohabbat	Rajiv Rai	Suniel Shetty, Arjun Rampal, Aftab Shivdasani, Isha Koppikar, Kirti Reddy	Romance
Pyaar Tune Kya Kiya	Rajat Mukherjee	Urmila Matondkar, Fardeen Khan, Sonali Kulkarni	Drama, romance, thriller
Pyaar Zindagi Hai	Vijay Sadanah	Vikas Kalantri, Ashima Bhalla, Mohnish Bahl, Asawari Joshi, Upasna Singh, Rajesh Khanna	Romance, thriller
Rahul	Prakash Jha	Neha, Jatin Grewal, Rajeshwari Sachdev	Drama
Rehnaa Hai Terre Dil Mein	Gautham Vasudev Menon	Saif Ali Khan, Dia Mirza, R. Madhavan, Navin Nischol, Anupam Kher	Romance
Shirdi Sai Baba			
Style	N. Chandra	Sahil Khan, Sharman Joshi, Riya Sen, Tara Deshpande	Romance
Tamboo Mein Bamoo	Dil Kumar	Raza Murad	Action
Tera Mera Saath Rahen	Mahesh Manjrekar	Ajay Devgn, Sonali Bendre, Namrata Shirodkar	Drama
Tere Liye	Sanjay Gadhvi	Imran Ahmed Khan, Sonali Khare, Neelu Kohli, Hiten Paintal	
Tum Bin	Anubhav Sinha	Priyanshu Chatterjee, Himanshu Malik, Sandali Sinha, Rakesh Bapat, Manoj Pahwa	Romance
Yaadein	Subhash Ghai	Hrithik Roshan, Kareena Kapoor, Jackie Shroff, Amrish Puri	Romance, drama
Yeh Raaste Hain Pyaar Ke	Deepak S. Shivdasani	Ajay Devgan, Madhuri Dixit, Preity Zinta, Sunny Deol (special appearance)	Drama
Yeh Teraa Ghar Yeh Meraa Ghar	Priyadarshan	Suniel Shetty, Mahima Chaudhry, Neeraj Vora, Paresh Rawal	Drama
Yeh Zindagi Ka Safar	Tanuja Chandra	Amisha Patel, Jimmy Shergill, Rajpal Yadav	Romance, drama
Zubeidaa	Shyam Benegal	Karisma Kapoor, Rekha, Manoj Bajpai, Amrish Puri, Lilette Dubey	Drama

== See also ==
- List of Hindi films of 2002
- List of Hindi films of 2000
