= Mukesh Rawal =

Indian actor (1951–2016)

- Born: 10 September 1951; Mumbai, India
- Died: 15 November 2016 (aged 65)
- Occupation: Actor
- Years active: 1986-2016
- Spouse: Mamta Rawal
- Children: 2

Mukesh Rawal (10 September 1951 – 15 November 2016) was an Indian actor. He worked in Hindi and Gujarati films and television shows. He was well known for playing Vibhishana in Ramanand Sagar's 1987 epic TV series Ramayan.

== Personal life ==
Mukesh Rawal was born in 1951 in Mumbai, India. His daughters Arya Rawal and Vipra Rawal are television actresses.

== Career ==
Rawal gained popularity for playing Vibhishana in the 1987 epic TV series Ramayan, created by Ramanand Sagar. He also acted in TV shows like Aaha, Hasratein, Kohi Apna Sa and Beend Banoonga aur Ghodi Chadoonga. He had acted in several Hindi films such as Zid (1994), Yeh Majhdhaar (1996), Lahoo Ke Do Rang (1997), Satta (2003), Auzaar (1997), Mrityudata (1997) and Kasak (2005).

Rawal was also a prolific actor in Gujarati film industry and theatre. His last Gujarati film was Sathiyo Chalyo Khodaldham (2014). He last acted in Gujarati TV serial Nass Nass Mei Khunnas (2016).

== Death ==
Rawal died by suicide on 15 November 2016, letting a train run over him in Kandivali, Mumbai, India. He was suffering from depression due to his son's death in 2000 in a train accident.

== Filmography ==
- Woh Phir Aayegi (1988)
- Gunahon Ke Shatranj (1988)
- Parki Jani (1991)
- Gruhparvesh (1992)
- Zid (1994)
- Krantiveer (1994)
- Cheetah (1994)
- Yeh Majhdhaar (1996)
- Shastra (1996)
- Auzaar (1997)
- Lahoo Ke Do Rang (1997)
- Mrityudaata (1997)
- Aahaa (1997)
- Vishwavidhaata (1997)
- Salaakhen (1998)
- Kohram (1999)
- Satta (2003)
- Kasak (2005)
- Wake Up Sid (2009)
- Haunted - 3D (2011)
- House For Sale (2012 Short film)
- Sathiyo Chalyo Khodaldham (2014, Gujarati film)

== Television ==
- Jeevan Mrityu (Gujarati) (1990s)
- Ramayana (1987-1988)
- Luv Kush (1988-1989)
- Maarshall
- Hasratein (1996-1999)
- CID (1998)
- Kohi Apna Sa (2001-2003)
- Ssshhhh... Koi Hai (2001-2004)
- Sambhav Asambhav (2003)
- Kabhi Saas Kabhi Bahu(2008-2010)
- Beend Banoongaa Ghodi Chadhaunga (2011-2012)
- Nass Nass Mei Khunnas (2016)
