= Vijayta Films =

Indian entertainment company

Vijayta Films Private Limited
- Vijayta Films logo
- Type: Private
- Industry: Entertainment
- Founded: 1983
- Founder: Dharmendra
- Headquarters: Mumbai, India
- Key people: Sunny Deol; Bobby Deol
- Products: Films
- Owner: Deol family
- Website: www.vijaytafilms.com

Vijayta Films Pvt Ltd is an Indian entertainment company owned by Sunny Deol and Bobby Deol. It started with Betaab (1983), the debut film of veteran actor, Dharmendra's son Sunny Deol and is most known for Ghayal (1990) starring Sunny Deol, which won seven Filmfare Awards.

== Filmography ==
Year	Film	Director	Notes
1983	Betaab	Rahul Rawail	2nd highest grossing Indian film of 1983, Nominated for 8 Filmfare Awards including Best Film
1990	Ghayal	Rajkumar Santoshi	2nd highest-grossing film of the year, National Film Award for Best Popular Film Providing Wholesome Entertainment; National Film Award – Special Jury Award Won 7 Filmfare Awards; Nominated for 8 more including Best Film
1995	Barsaat	Rajkumar Santoshi	5th highest-grossing movie of the year, Won 4 Filmfare Awards; Nominated for 5 more including Best Film
1999	Dillagi	Sunny Deol	
2001	Indian	N. Maharajan	Remake of Vallarasu; 4th highest-grossing movie of the year
2002	23rd March 1931: Shaheed	Guddu Dhanoa	
2005	Socha Na Tha	Imtiaz Ali	Abhay Deol debut film; Imtiaz Ali's directorial debut.
2007	Apne	Anil Sharma	
2008	Chamku	Kabeer Kaushik	Co-produced with Zee Motion Pictures
2013	Yamla Pagla Deewana 2	Sangeeth Sivan	Produced under the banner: Sunny Sounds, a subsidiary of Vijayta Films
2016	Ghayal Once Again	Sunny Deol	
2019	Pal Pal Dil Ke Paas	Sunny Deol	
