= Anokha (disambiguation) =

Anokha may refer to:

- Anokha Bandhan, 1982 Indian Hindi-language drama film by Mehul Kumar, starring Shabana Azmi
- Anokha Rishta, 1986 Indian Hindi-language romanctic drama film by I. V. Sasi, starring Rajesh Khanna and Smita Patil
- Anokha Pyar, 1948 Indian Hindi-language romance film by M. I. Dharamsey, starring Dilip Kumar and Nargis
- Anokha Ladla, Pakistani TV series
- Anokha, 1975 Indian Hindi-language action drama film by Jugal Kishore, starring Shatrughan Sinha and Zarina Wahab.
