= Nari Hira =

Indian publisher (1938–2024)

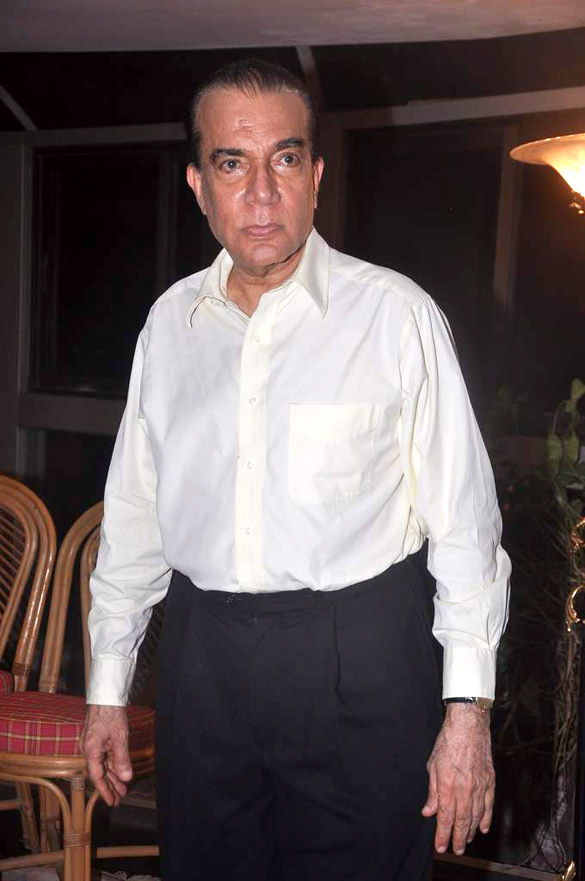
Hira in 2012

Nari Hira (1938 – 23 August 2024) was an Indian publisher who was the owner of the Mumbai-based Magna Publishing Co. Ltd. that publishes magazines such as Stardust, Savvy, Showtime, Society and Health. He was also into film production through Magna Films, a subsidiary of his publishing company.

Nari Hira started his career working in an advertising agency. Later, he moved to the publishing business and started Magna Publishing. His first and largest success came through the magazine Stardust launched in 1971.

He also pioneered the video films genre in the 1980s by producing around 15 video films under his banner Hiba Films. The films did reasonably well and launched several well-known stars such as Aditya Pancholi and Urmila Matondkar. Most of these films were targeted for Adult viewers.

In 2007, he again got into the film production business through Magna Films, a subsidiary of his publication group. His first production was the 2008 film Bhram. He had a couple of films lined up for a 2009 release.

Hira died on 23 August 2024.

== Movies Produced by Hiba Films ==
(selected list)

Movies Produced by Hiba Films
Year	Film	Cast	Director
1985	Scandal	Urmila Matondkar, Balbinder	Pavan Kaul
1986	Shingora	Aditya Pancholi, Marc Zuber, Persis Khambatta, Anju Mahendru, Ardhendu Bose, Neeta Puri	Anil Tejani, Nari Hira (story)
1986	Kalank Ka Tika	Aditya Pancholi, Kanwaljeet Singh, Zarina Wahab, Narendranath, Neeta Puri, Rita Bhaduri, Anju Mahendru Sp. Appearance	Pavan Kaul
1986	Sone Ka Pinjara	Aditya Pancholi, Sanjay Dutt, Adi Irani, Anju Mahendru, Anil Dhawan, Neeta Puri, Anirudh Agarwal, Mac Mohan	Surendra Bhatia
1987	Abhishek	Aditya Pancholi, Archana Puran Singh, Neeta Puri	Pavan Kaul
1987	Shahadat	Om Puri, Supriya Pathak, Aditya Pancholi, Archana Puran Singh, Neeta Puri, Rita Bhaduri, Jeet Upendra (his First film)	Anil Tejani
1987	Khatarnak Irade	Aditya Pancholi, Neeta Puri, Anju Mahendru, Ardhendu Bose, Rajendra Gupta, Mac Mohan,	Uday Shankar Pani, Nari Hira (story)
1987	Naqli Chehra	Urmila Matondkar, Neeta Puri, Jeet Upendra, Bharti Achrekar,	Pavan Kaul
1989	Shaamat	Sahil Chaddha, Kanwaljeet Singh	Anil Tejani
