= Fauj Mein Mauj =

- Directed by: Murli Nagavalli
- Written by: Farhad
- Produced by: Ravi Walia
- Starring: Rajpal Yadav; Megha Taak; Prajwal Kale; Mallika Sherawat; Sharat Saxena; Asrani
- Cinematography: Om Prakash
- Music by: Pritam Chakraborty
- Distributed by: Rising Star Entertainment
- Country: India
- Language: Hindi

Fauj Mein Mauj (English: Fun in the Army) is an unreleased Bollywood comedy film directed by Murli Nagavalli, and produced by Ravi Walia. The film stars featured are Paresh Rawal Rajpal Yadav, Zakir Hussain, Sharat Saxena, Asrani, and Mallika Sherawat

== Plot ==
In the year 2007, and India gets her first female defense Minister, who declares that the all-male infantry division must allow women into its ranks. Only one woman wants to enlist, Sunehri Dhanda.

== Cast ==
- Paresh Rawal
- Rajpal Yadav
- Zakir Hussain
- Mallika Sherawat
- Sharat Saxena
- Mukesh Rishi
- Asrani
- Lillete Dubey
