= Champion (2000 film) =

- Cover
- Directed by: Padam Kumar
- Screenplay by: N. Maharajan; Vijay Shetty; Venkatesh
- Dialogues by: Sanjay Masoomm
- Story by: Padam Kumar
- Produced by: Sujeet Kumar
- Starring: Sunny Deol; Manisha Koirala; Rahul Dev; Abhishek Sharma
- Cinematography: Tirru
- Edited by: Shirish Kunder
- Music by: Score: Aadesh Shrivastava; Songs: Anu Malik; Anand Raj Anand (guest); Vishal–Shekhar (guest)
- Production company: Shree Shiv Bhakti Films
- Distributed by: Shemaroo Entertainment
- Release date: 22 December 2000
- Country: India
- Language: Hindi
- Budget: ₹10 crore
- Box office: ₹16 crore (India Net)

Champion is a 2000 Indian Hindi-language action film directed by Padam Kumar, starring Sunny Deol, Manisha Koirala and Rahul Dev. The rights to this film are owned by Red Chillies Entertainment. The film featured Vishal–Shekhar's first composition together, who composed two tracks on the album including the title track "Aisa Champion Kahan".

== Plot ==
Rajveer Singh, a cop from a village in Punjab, has the sole dream of becoming a supercop and wiping out all crime. After training, he gets his first posting in Mumbai for a special assignment. On arrival, he is disappointed to find that his first job is to protect a nine-year-old boy, Abbas Khan as he considers it a menial job.

Abbas is the sole heir to millions of riches left to him by his parents, who died in a plane crash. The only threat to Abbas's life is Nazir, who is responsible for the plane crash that killed Abbas' parents. Nazir's father was helping terrorists in secret. Nazir blames Abbas' father for the murder-suicide of his entire family carried out by his own father.

Abbas has one guardian and that is Sapna. She is a model and very close to Abbas and his family. From the moment they meet Rajveer and Abbas don’t get along all. Rajveer holds a grudge against Abbas. He thinks Abbas ruined his dream of becoming a supercop. On the hand Abbas feels trapped. He blames Rajveer for limiting his freedom saying it’s all for security.. Abbas doesn’t like that kind of control. So he goes to Sapna for help. They start working to fight back. They plan pranks. They want to make Rajveer go away. Their rivalry turns into something playful. It becomes a love-hate relationship. There's a lot of fun. There's a lot of laughter. The tension between them keeps growing.. Then something changes. Rajveer and Sapna begin to fall in love. At the time Rajveer and Abbas start to understand each other. They see things, from each other’s point of view. By the end the situation changes. The real danger is not the bickering. The real danger is Nazir. Nazir is the one who poses a real threat to Abbas’s life. Rajveer knows this.. He is willing to risk everything to protect Abbas. He is willing to risk his life for Abbas. The story ends with a moment of sacrifice and true loyalty.

Nazir makes several chilling attempts to eliminate Abbas. Now the only way to get Abbas out of danger is for Rajveer to nab Nazir. Rajveer kills Nazir in a thrilling climax, rescuing Abbas and uniting with Sapna.

== Cast ==
- Sunny Deol as Inspector Rajveer Singh
- Manisha Koirala as Sapna Khanna – Rajveer’s girlfriend
- Rahul Dev as Nazeer Ahmed
- Master Abhishek Sharma as Abbas Ali Khan
- Rana Jung Bahadur as Manager Ashish Pandey
- Vivek Shauq as House caretaker
- Surendra Pal as DCP Malik
- Vikram Gokhale as Police Commissioner
- Tom Alter as Doctor
- Deepak Parashar as Nawab Mansoor Ali Khan – Abbas's father
- Padmini Kapila as Mrs. Mansoor Ali Khan – Abbas's mother
- Rakesh Pandey as Mukhtar Ahmed – Nazeer's Father
- Kamal Chopra as Rajveer's father
- Dina Pathak as Rajveer's grandmother
- Baby Tanvi Hegde as Abbas's friend
- Master Jasmeet Jaggi as Abbas's friend
- Master Kaivalya Chheda as Abbas's friend
- Kashmera Shah as Dancer in song

== Awards ==
Awards and Nominations for Rahul Dev
Year	Award	Category	Result
2002	IIFA Awards	Star Debut of the Year – Male	**Won**
2002	Filmfare Awards	Best Performance in a Negative Role	**Nominated**
2002	Zee Cine Awards	Best Debut Actor	**Nominated**
2002	Screen Awards	Best Actor in a Negative Role	**Nominated**
2002	Screen Awards	Most Promising Newcomer – Male	**Nominated**
2002	Sansui Viewer's Choice Awards	Best Debut Actor	**Nominated**

== Music ==
Anu Malik composed the music for the songs, with guest compositions by Anand Raj Anand and Vishal–Shekhar. The lyrics were penned by Javed Akhtar, Nitin Raikwar and Anand Raj Anand.

- "Aisa Champion Kahan" (Music: Vishal–Shekhar): Sunidhi Chauhan, Jaspinder Narula
- "Ek Ladki Jiski Aankhein" (Music: Anu Malik): Udit Narayan, Alka Yagnik
- "Jatt Lutya Gaya" (Music: Anand Raj Anand): Hema Sardesai
- "Koi Deewane Ko" (Music: Anu Malik): Roop Kumar Rathod, Alka Yagnik (Not in the film)
- "Lelo Lelo" (Music: Vishal–Shekhar): Poornima, Udit Narayan (Not in the film)
- "Na Baba Na Baba" (Music: Anu Malik): Kavita Krishnamurthy
- "Tu Kya Cheez Hai" (Music: Anu Malik): Abhijeet Bhattacharya, Kavita Krishnamurthy
