= Jung Baaz =

Jungbaaz
- Directed by: Mehul Kumar
- Written by: Mehul Kumar; Anwar Khan; Nusrat Sayyed
- Produced by: Pranlal V. Mehta
- Starring: Raaj Kumar; Govinda; Mandakini
- Cinematography: Russi Billimoria
- Edited by: Yusuf Sheikh
- Music by: Ravindra Jain
- Production company: Prathima Films
- Release date: 16 June 1989
- Country: India
- Language: Hindi

Jungbaaz is a 1989 Hindi action drama movie directed and co-written by Mehul Kumar. It stars Raaj Kumar, Govinda, Mandakini in lead roles.

== Plot ==
Arjun's mother and young brother are killed by Mahakaal and his henchman after his brother witnessed them murdering a man. With the help of veteran advocate KP Saxena, Mahakaal got Arjun convicted for the murders. Arjun manages to escape from prison and take his revenge on them.

== Cast ==
- Raaj Kumar as Advocate Krishna Prasad (KP) Saxena
- Moushumi Chatterjee as Mrs. Saxena (special appearance)
- Raj Kiran as Inspector Jwala Prasad Saxena (special appearance)
- Govinda as Arjun Shrivastav
- Mandakini as Sangeeta Mathur/Neena Ninjo
- Prem Chopra as Bahadur Singh
- Danny Denzongpa as Mahakaal
- Aruna Irani as Neelam
- Shakti Kapoor as Numbaridas
- Gulshan Grover as Rocky Verma
- Tej Sapru as Teju
- Vikas Anand as Judge

== Soundtrack ==
Lyrics: Ravindra Jain

Song	Singer
"Rain Andheri, Akeli Jawani, Jawani Ki Dushman Yeh Duniya Deewani"	Asha Bhosle, Mohammed Aziz
"Ganga Jaisa Man Tera, Gore Mukh Pe Savera"	Mohammed Aziz, Kavita Krishnamurthy
"Ganga Jaisa Man Tera, Gore Mukh Pe Savera" (Short)	Mohammed Aziz, Kavita Krishnamurthy
"Jungbaaz Aa Gaye"	Mohammed Aziz, Mahendra Kapoor
"Ek Raja, Ek Rani, Ek Rajkumar"	Mahendra Kapoor, Hemlata, Rekha Rao, Hussain Bloch
"Naam Hai Mera Neena Ninjo"	Kavita Krishnamurthy
