= Sheela Sharma =

Indian actress

- Born: Valsad District, Gujarat, India
- Occupation: Actress
- Years active: 1982–present
- Known for: Hum Saath Saath Hain
- Spouse: Subhash Sharma
- Children: Madalsa Sharma

Sheela Sharma (née David) is an Indian film and television actress in Hindi and Gujarati cinema, best known for the films Nadiya Ke Paar (1982), Hum Saath Saath Hain and Mere Yaar Ki Shaadi Hai.

== Early life ==
Born in Valsad district, Gujarat, she now lives in Mumbai. After completing her schooling from St Joseph's Convent School, Valsad, she studied at Siddharth College of Law, Mumbai.

== Personal life ==
She is married to Subhash Sharma, a writer and director, who owns a production house in Mumbai. He is an FTII graduate. Her daughter Madalsa Sharma is also an actress in Indian television. Madalsa is married to Mimoh, Mithun Chakraborty's son.

== Filmography ==
- Sun Sajna (1982)
- Nadiya Ke Paar (1982)
- Abodh (1984)
- Sadaa Suhagan (1986)
- Mai (1989, Bhojpuri)
- Sati Toral (1989, Gujarati)
- Baisa Ra Jatan Karo (1990, Rajasthani)
- Naukar Biwi Ka (1983)
- Daraar (1996) as Asha, Nurse
- Ghatak (1996)
- Yes Boss (1997)
- Mann (1999)
- Hum Saath-Saath Hain (1999) as Jyoti Anurag Pandey
- Chori Chori Chupke Chupke (2001)
- Ajnabee (2001)
- Chalo Ishq Ladaaye (2002)
- Humraaz (2002)
- Raja Bhaiya (2003)
- Unns: Love... Forever (2006)
- Bhoot Unkle (2006)
- Sarhad Paar (2007)
- Journey Bombay to Goa: Laughter Unlimited (2007)
- Do Knot Disturb (2009)
- Kaalo (2010)
- Ammaa Ki Boli (2013)
- Sathiyo Chalyo Khodaldham (2014, Gujarati)

=== Television ===
Year	Title	Role	Notes
1988	Mahabharat	Devaki	
1993	Naya Nukkad	Sweetie from Social Club	
1994	Junoon	Kajri	
1995	Zee Horror Show	Murti and Kabrastaan	
1998	Hum Sab Ek Hain	Rubina	
	CID	Episodic Roles	
2004	Ana	Meena	
2007	Sapna Babul ka… Bidaai		
2008	Mata Ki Chowki	Sheel Kumar's Wife	
2013	Madhubala – Ek Ishq Ek Junoon		
2015	Dilli Wali Thakur Gurls	Bhudevi Chachi	
	Ajab Gajab Ghar Jamai	Special Appearance	
2016	Best of Luck Nikki	Daisy	
2019	Sanjivani	Nurse Philo	
2022 – 2024	Rabb Se Hai Dua	Zeenat "Dadi Ammi" Akhtar	
2024	Pyar Ka Pehla Naam: Radha Mohan	Pari Kohli	

=== Web Series ===
Year	Title	Role	Notes
2023	Mushaira	Khala	
