= Neeta Puri =

American actress and model

- Born: Jallandhar, Punjab, India
- Citizenship: United States
- Occupations: Actress, Model
- Years active: 1983–1999
- Known for: Nafrat Ki Aandhi; Awwal Number; Satyamev Jayate
- Title: Miss India USA 1983
- Website: neetapuri.com

Neeta Puri is an Indian-American former actress and model who worked predominantly in Hindi films.

== Early life ==
Puri was born in Punjab, India. She won the Miss India contest of New York in 1983.

== Career ==
She made her film debut in 1985.

== Personal life ==
Neeta Puri born as Latifa Kursid father Khursheed Latif, who is also a Hindi film director.She is married Sidhant Mohapatra .Puri owns a western clothing and jewelry store named "Neeta Puri's Expressions". She now lives in Delaware Water Gap, Pennsylvania.

== Filmography ==
Year	Title	Role(s)	Director(s)	Language(s)	Notes	Ref.
1987	Satyamev Jayate	Roopali	Raj N. Sippy	Hindi		
1988	Aaj Ke Angaare	Cynthia	Vinod K. Verma	Hindi		
1989	Wohi Bhayanak Raat	Rupaali	Vinod Talwar	Hindi		
1989	Jailkhana		D.S. Azad	Hindi		
1989	Nafrat Ki Aandhi	———	Mehul Kumar	Hindi	Dancer in He-Man song	
1989	Mera Naseeb		S. Karnam	Hindi		
1989	Lashkar	Sanga's Daughter	Jagdish Kadar	Hindi		
1989	Apna Desh Paraye Log	Shivani	Pradeep Hooda	Hindi		
1989	Khuli Khidki	Neetu A. Jayant	P. Chandrakumar	Hindi		
1990	Awwal Number	Maria	Dev Anand	Hindi		
1991	Afsana Pyar Ka		M.R Shahjahan	Hindi		
1991	Shiv Ram		Jagdish A. Sharma	Hindi		
1992	Ye Hai Ghar Ki Mahabharata	Rekha	Chander Sharma	Hindi		
1992	Benaam Rishte		Shyam Gupta	Hindi		
1992	Mahanagaram	Sony	T. K. Rajeev Kumar	Malayalam		
1993	Kasam Teri Kasam		Raman Kumar	Hindi		
1994	Pyara Sangam		Ramnath Roy	Hindi		
1994	Masti		Iqbal Channa	Hindi		
1994	Ajana Path		Srinivas Chakraborty	Bengali		
1999	Hai Kaun Woh		Rakesh Kakaria	Hindi		

== Television ==
Year	Title	Role	Notes	Ref(s)
1985-1986	CBS Schoolbreak Special	Maneka Desai	Season 2 Episode 3	
