= Afsana Pyar Ka =

- Theatrical release poster
- Directed by: M. R. Shahjahan
- Written by: Ramesh Pant (Dialogues); Bono Deb (story and screenplay)
- Produced by: Manoj Seksaria; Sanjay Seksaria; Arvind Seksaria
- Starring: Aamir Khan; Neelam; Deepak Tijori; Neeta Puri
- Cinematography: W. B. Rao
- Edited by: Afaque Husain
- Music by: Bappi Lahiri
- Distributed by: Shemaroo Video PVT. Limited & Spark Worldwide
- Release date: 26 April 1991
- Running time: 145 min.
- Country: India
- Language: Hindi

Afsana Pyar Ka (translation: The Tale of Love) is a 1991 Indian romantic drama film starring Aamir Khan, Neelam, Deepak Tijori, and Neeta Puri in the lead roles. The music of the film became very successful, especially the songs "Nazren Mili", and "Tip Tip Tip Tip Baarish Shuru Ho Gayi".

== Plot ==
Animosity has existed between the families of Raj and Nikita's respective fathers. But their children have grown up without any knowledge of this animosity. They meet in college, and after a few misunderstandings both fall in love with each other. They plan to marry, and accordingly inform their respective families of their plans. Both the families view this alliance as unacceptable, and refuse to bless the young couple. Raj and Nikita have one choice - marry the person their respective families have selected for them, or elope.

== Cast ==
- Aamir Khan as Raj
- Neelam as Nikita
- Deepak Tijori as Deepak
- Neeta Puri as Neeta
- Saeed Jaffrey as Anand Verma
- Kiran Kumar as Mahendra Behl
- Beena Banerjee as Beena
- Amita Nangia as Deepa
- Rakesh Bedi as Rakesh
- Viju Khote as Gurumurthy
- Jeet Upendra as Vikram

== Music ==
Lyrics by Sameer and Anjaan.

Song	Singer
"Aashiq Deewana"	Amit Kumar
"Tip Tip Tip Tip"	Asha Bhosle, Amit Kumar
"Nazren Mili"	Asha Bhosle, Amit Kumar
"Afsana Pyar Ka"	Asha Bhosle, Udit Narayan
"Yaad Teri Aati Hai"	Alka Yagnik
