= Mukesh Rishi =

Indian actor, film producer (born 1956)

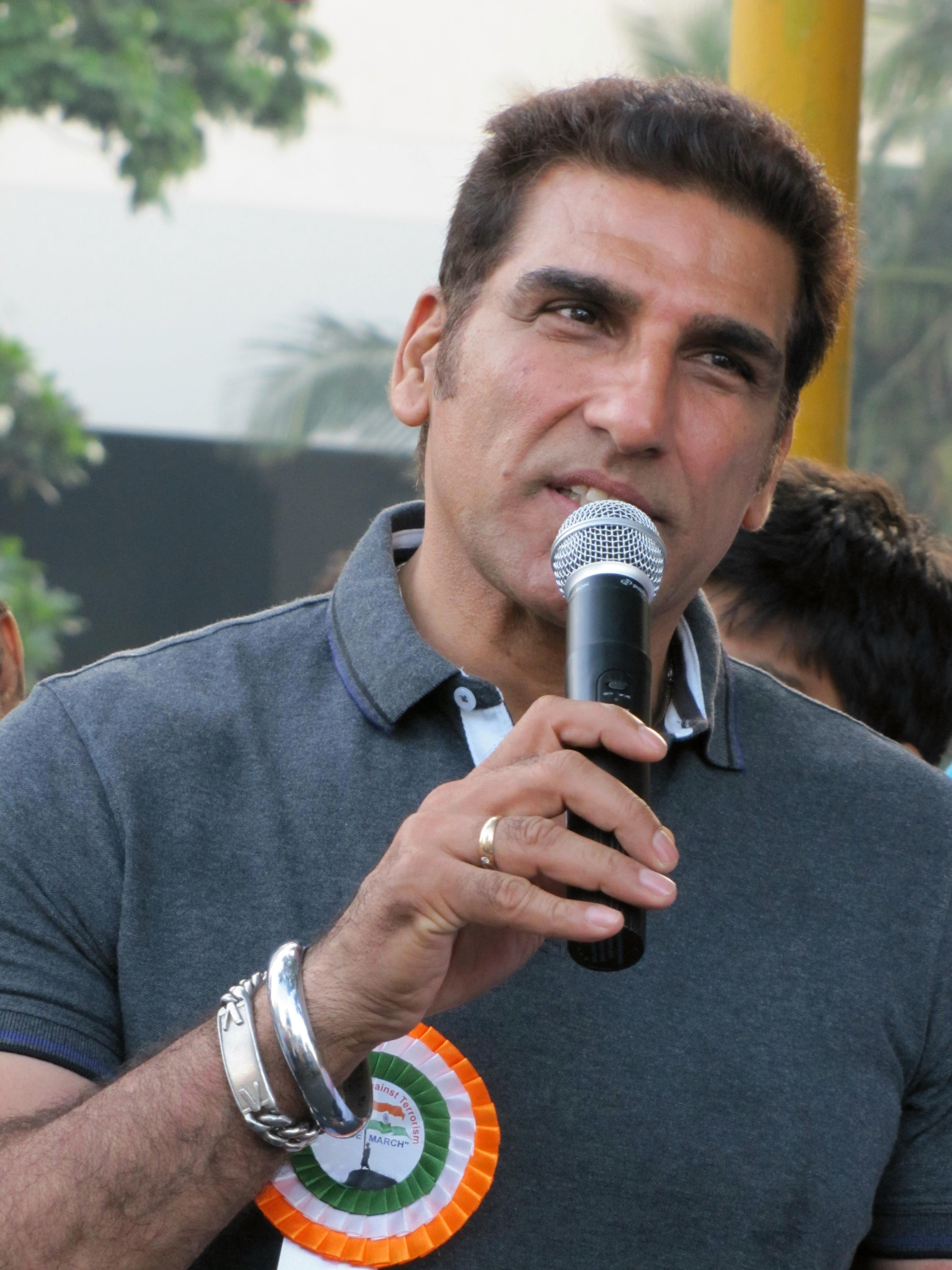
- Rishi during a peace rally in Mumbai in 2011
- Born: 19 April 1956 (age 70); Kathua, Jammu and Kashmir, India
- Occupations: Actor; film producer
- Years active: 1988–present
- Spouse: Keshni Rishi
- Children: 2

Mukesh Rishi (born 19 April 1956) is an Indian actor and film producer who works primarily in Hindi and Telugu films. He has also appeared in Malayalam, Kannada, Punjabi, Marathi and Tamil films. He got his first break in Hindi in 1993 with Gardish and has since, established himself as a notable supporting actor, generally as a villain.

== Early life ==
Rishi was born in Jammu. His pre-partition roots lie in Mirpur, now in Pakistan-administred Kashmir. After his graduation from Government College, Sector 11, Chandigarh, and working for two years in Mumbai, Rishi moved to Fiji for work, where he met his future wife, who is of Indo-Fijian ancestry. Her family ran a traditional departmental store. He has a lucrative investment portfolio including warehouse investments.

After marriage, they went to New Zealand, where Mukesh started his career as a model. However, he could hardly find time for modelling due to a busy work schedule and was dissatisfied with his modelling assignments. After seven years, he returned to Mumbai, India and enrolled in Roshan Taneja's acting school, and later got his break with Sanjay Khan's serial The Sword of Tipu Sultan (1990), where he played the villain, Mir Sadiq.

== Filmography ==
=== Hindi films ===
Key
| † | Denotes films that have not yet been released |

Hindi film credits
| Year | Title | Role | Notes |
|---|---|---|---|
| 1993 | Parampara | Thakur Bhavani Singh's Man | |
| 1993 | Gardish | Billa Jilani | |
| 1995 | Surakshaa | Jagtap | |
| 1995 | Baazi | Raghu | |
| 1995 | Sanjay | | |
| 1995 | Ram Shastra | Satpal Dhonga | |
| 1996 | Shastra | Baadshah Khan | |
| 1996 | Saajan Chale Sasural | Nana | |
| 1996 | Bhishma | Nagesh Rana | |
| 1996 | Loafer | Badshah | |
| 1996 | Sapoot | Tejeshwar | |
| 1996 | Ghatak | Jeena | |
| 1996 | Ram Aur Shyam | Jabar | |
| 1997 | Naseeb | | |
| 1997 | Mrityudaata | Rana Tonga | |
| 1997 | Judwaa | Ratanlal Tiger | |
| 1997 | Kaalia | Pratap Singh | |
| 1997 | Gupt: The Hidden Truth | Babu Anna | Cameo |
| 1997 | Lahoo Ke Do Rang | Teja Shikari | |
| 1998 | Hatyara | Singhania | |
| 1998 | Gunda | Bulla | |
| 1998 | Vinashak – Destroyer | Ajgar | |
| 1998 | Humse Badhkar Kaun | Akal | |
| 1998 | Iski Topi Uske Sarr | | |
| 1998 | Zulm-O-Sitam | Police Commissioner | |
| 1998 | Bandhan | Gajendra | |
| 1999 | Lohpurush | Ganesh Tandiya | |
| 1999 | Nyaydaata | Jabbar / Lankeshwar / Jwala Prasad | |
| 1999 | Lal Baadshah | S.P. Ajit Singh | |
| 1999 | Aarzoo | C.L.Mishra | |
| 1999 | Sarfarosh | Inspector Saleem | |
| 1999 | Sooryavansham | Deshraj Thakur aka Kevda Thakur | |
| 1999 | Kohram | Ghafoor Changezi | |
| 1999 | Arjun Pandit | Ramu Kaalia | |
| 2000 | Jwalamukhi | Ranga Rao | |
| 2000 | Pukar | Bakshi | |
| 2000 | Qurbaaniyan | Singhania | |
| 2000 | Hamara Dil Aapke Paas Hai | Bhawani Chaudhry | |
| 2000 | Kurukshetra | Iqbal Pasina | |
| 2000 | Khiladi 420 | Bhai | |
| 2001 | Aashiq | Sapna's Brother | |
| 2001 | Jodi No.1 | Baburao | |
| 2001 | Indian | Wasim Khan | |
| 2002 | Tumko Na Bhool Paayenge | Inspector M.K.Sharma | |
| 2002 | Yeh Kaisi Mohabbat | ACP | |
| 2002 | Hum Kisise Kum Nahin | Pillai's Brother | |
| 2002 | Maseeha | Surajbhan | |
| 2003 | Dum | Raj Dutt Sharma | |
| 2003 | Indian Babu | Thakur Suraj Pratap Singh | |
| 2003 | Om | DSP Pathan | |
| 2003 | Jaal | Afghani | |
| 2003 | Koi... Mil Gaya | Inspector Khan | |
| 2003 | Dil Pardesi Ho Gayaa | Tabrez Baig | |
| 2004 | Run | Rajeev | |
| 2004 | Garv | Zafar Supari | |
| 2004 | Asambhav | Youssan Baksh | |
| 2005 | The White Land | Social Worker | |
| 2005 | It Could Be You | Mr. Sidhu | |
| 2005 | Blackmail | Chota | |
| 2006 | Vishwa | | |
| 2006 | Teesri Aankh | Sudama Pandey | |
| 2007 | Fauj Mein Mauj | General | |
| 2007 | Nehlle Pe Dehlla | Dilher | Delayed film. |
| 2008 | Krazzy 4 | Rana | |
| 2010 | Lahore | Noor Mohammad | |
| 2010 | Khuda Kasam | Lalkar Singh | Delayed film. |
| 2010 | Ramayana – The Epic | Hanuman | Animated film. |
| 2011 | Force | Vijay Reddy (Anna) | |
| 2012 | Khiladi 786 | Ikhattar Singh | |
| 2013 | Rajdhani Express | S.I | |
| 2013 | Maazii | Malhaan Singh | Cameo |
| 2014 | Ek Tha Sardar | Police Officer | Deccani film |
| 2015 | Hum Tum Dushman Dushman | Anil Gujjar | |
| 2016 | Mahayoddha Rama | Hanuman (voice) | Animated film |
| 2017 | Raktdhar | Linga Shetty | |
| 2020 | Gul Makai | Maulana Fazlullah | |
| 2022 | Before You Die | | |
| 2025 | Mere Husband Ki Biwi | Prabhleen’s father | |

=== Telugu films ===
Telugu film credits
| Year | Title | Role | Notes |
|---|---|---|---|
| 1994 | Gandeevam | Inspector Veeru Pentaiah | |
| 2000 | Manoharam | Basha | |
| 2001 | Narasimha Naidu | Kuppu Swamy Naidu | |
| 2001 | Adhipathi | Dunnapothula Dharma Rao | |
| 2002 | Indra | Veera Shankar Reddy | |
| 2003 | Okkadu | DCP Vijay Varma | |
| 2003 | Simhadri | Bhai Saab | |
| 2003 | Palnati Brahmanayudu | Narsinga Naidu's friend | |
| 2003 | Seetayya | Venkat Naidu | |
| 2004 | Nenunnanu | JP | |
| 2004 | Aaptudu | Gangi Reddy | |
| 2004 | Suryam | Madhulatha's father | |
| 2004 | Vijayendra Varma | Aslam Khan | |
| 2005 | Bunny | Maisamma | |
| 2005 | Allari Pidugu | G. K. | |
| 2005 | Okkade | Subbarayudu | |
| 2006 | Pournami | Narasimha | |
| 2006 | Bangaram | Peddi Reddy | |
| 2006 | Stalin | Lt. Col. Iqbal Kakar | |
| 2008 | Jalsa | Damodar Reddy | |
| 2008 | Kantri | Kranti's grandfather | |
| 2009 | Maska | Simhachalam | |
| 2009 | Drona | Drona's father | |
| 2009 | Arya 2 | Raji Reddy | |
| 2009 | Saleem | Appala Naidu | |
| 2010 | Namo Venkatesa | Chengala Rayudu / Shankar Thakur | |
| 2010 | Shambo Shiva Shambo | Rajanna | |
| 2010 | Darling | Nisha's father | |
| 2010 | Brindavanam | Surendra | |
| 2011 | Teen Maar | Vasumathi's father | |
| 2011 | Rajanna | Landlord | |
| 2011 | Dhada | Rhea's father | |
| 2012 | Rebel | Jayram / Robert | |
| 2012 | Racha | Bellary | |
| 2013 | Baadshah | Dhanraj | |
| 2013 | Ramayya Vasthavayya | Mosallapadu Nagabhushanam | |
| 2013 | Attarintiki Daredi | Hari Nanda | |
| 2014 | Pandavulu Pandavulu Thummeda | Suryodhana | |
| 2014 | Race Gurram | Peddi Reddy | |
| 2014 | Power | Home Minister Jayavardhan | |
| 2014 | Loukyam | Keshava Reddy | |
| 2015 | Beeruva | Adikeshavulu | |
| 2015 | Srimanthudu | Venkata Ratnam | |
| 2015 | Sher | Dadha | |
| 2015 | Loafer | Mouni's Father | |
| 2015 | Bruce Lee | IB Chief Bharadwaj | |
| 2015 | Soukhyam | Krishna Rao | |
| 2016 | Krishnashtami | Raghupati | |
| 2016 | Sardaar Gabbar Singh | Hari Narayana | |
| 2016 | Brahmotsavam | Babu's distant relative | |
| 2017 | Goutham Nanda | Mudra | |
| 2017 | Winner | Dharmendra Reddy | |
| 2018 | Pantham | Anand Surana | |
| 2018 | Kavacham | Mahendra Varma | |
| 2019 | Vinaya Vidheya Rama | Pandyam Parasuram | |
| 2019 | Maharshi | Bhanu Prasad | |
| 2019 | Sye Raa Narasimha Reddy | Papa Khan | |
| 2021 | Vakeel Saab | MP Korentla Rajendra | |
| 2022 | Khiladi | Home Minister Guru Singham | |
| 2024 | Saindhav | Vishwamithra "Mithra" | |
| 2024 | Buddy | Aditya’s uncle | |
| 2024 | Manamey | Kushi’s grandfather | |

=== Malayalam films ===
Malayalam film credits
| Year | Title | Role | Notes |
|---|---|---|---|
| 1993 | Gandharvam | Rangan | |
| 1999 | Olympian Anthony Adam | Alvin | |
| 2003 | War and Love | Jaffar Khan | |
| 2007 | Black Cat | ADGP Aggarwal | |

=== Kannada films ===
Kannada film credits
| Year | Title | Role | Notes |
|---|---|---|---|
| 2005 | Namma Basava | ACP Dhanraj | |
| 2007 | Bhoopathi | Aravind Ram | |
| 2008 | Bombaat | Gajendra | |
| 2010 | School Master | Appu | |
| 2011 | Kanteerava | Balasahab | |
| 2011 | Maryade Ramanna | Desai | |
| 2022 | James | Rathanlal | |

=== Punjabi films ===
- Mitter Pyare Nu Haal Mureedan Da Kehna (2004)
- Waris Shah: Ishq Daa Waaris (2006)
- Taur Mittran Di (2012)
- Jatt James Bond (2014)
- Sikka (2015)
- Ishq My Religion (2019)
- Nidarr (2023)
- Nanak Naam Jahaz Hain (2024)
- Badnaam (2025)

=== Bhojpuri movies ===
- Dulhan Chahi Pakistan Se (2016)

=== Tamil movies ===
- Vallarasu (2000) as Wasim Khan
- Ramana (2002) as Jalandhar Singh
- Singam 2 (2013) as Bhai, partner of Thangaraj

=== Marathi ===
- Balgandharva (2011) as Pathan
- Truckbhar Swapna (2021) as R.K.
- Sher Shivraj (2022) as Afzalkhan

=== Odia ===
- Aakhi Palakare Tu (2010)

=== Television serials ===
- The Sword of Tipu Sultan (1990) as Mir Sadiq
- Chittod Ki Rani Padmini Ka Johur (2009)
- Prithvi Vallabh (2018)

=== Web series ===
- Abhay (2019)
- Indian Police Force (2024)
- Salakaar (2025) as Zia-ul-Haq
- Objection, My Lord! as Viswanath

== Awards and nominations ==
- 2000: Nominated: Filmfare Award for Best Supporting Actor – Sarfarosh
- 2003: Nominated: Filmfare Award for Best Villain – Telugu – Indra
- 2004: Nominated: Filmfare Award for Best Villain – Telugu – Seetayya
