= Mahanagaram =

- Promotional poster
- Directed by: T. K. Rajeev Kumar
- Screenplay by: Dennis Joseph
- Story by: Muttathu Varkey
- Produced by: K. G. George
- Starring: Mammootty; Murali; Shanthi Krishna; Neeta Puri; Thilakan
- Distributed by: Mak Distributions
- Release date: 1992
- Country: India
- Language: Malayalam

Mahanagaram is a 1992 Malayalam language action thriller film directed by T. K. Rajeev Kumar and starring Mammootty, Murali, Shanthi Krishna, Neeta Puri, and Thilakan.

== Plot ==
The movie commences with a smuggling sequence in which Chanthakkad Viswan grabs the goods from customs and takes them to his clients. When he refuses their offer to join them as a partner, the dispute starts. When he is driving back to his home town in Calicut, he is attacked by a bunch of criminals, but he is saved by Chandradas IPS, who is on his way to Calicut to take charge as the Asst. Police Commissioner. He takes Viswan to the hospital. He introduces himself, which is quite a surprise for him. However, Viswan poses as a farmer. Later he skips from the hospital and meets again with Chandradas and his family with his broken wheels. They go with him and take a visit to Viswan's guest house on a beach. Ummaru Kutti, his so-called manager, drives them to their premises. Later they come to know that he is the son-in-law of Writer, a notorious landlord. The story slowly goes into pace.

In the next part, Chandradas realizes the hidden face of Viswam. Viswam informs Chandrdas about a smuggling deal, and Chandrdas takes them down. He gets fame in no time. However, the smuggling team belongs to Writer. Before the questioning program starts, Writer's henchmen finish the prisoner. Chandradas is forced to obey him, in order to wash off the dirt. Viswan catches the murderer, but Chandradas ignores the whole story. Viswam meets his ex-lover, Sony. She is now the Assistant Collector.

Meanwhile, Chandradas' children are kidnapped. The movie slowly reaches its climax.

== Cast ==
- Mammootty as Viswanathan/Chanthakadu Viswan
- Murali as Commissioner Chandradas
- Thilakan as Kelu Writer, The main antagonist
- Neeta Puri as District Collector Sony
- Shanthi Krishna as Geetha
- Ashokan as Ummerkutty
- K. B. Ganesh Kumar as Raju
- Bheeman Raghu as DYSP Padmanabhan
- Kuthiravattam Pappu as Keshu
- Prathapachandran as Chief Minister CKR
- M. G. Soman as Kumaran Master, Viswanathan's father
- Kaviyoor Ponnamma as Bharathi,Vishwanathan's Mother
- Meena as Vakeelamma, Kelu Writer's Wife
- K. P. A. C. Sunny as Shankara Menon
- Kundara Johny as Commissioner Shankar
- V. K. Sreeraman as Victor D'Souza, Secondary antagonist
- Shivaji
- Augustine as Thankappan
- Zeenath as Thankappan's Wife
- T. P. Madhavan
- P. C. George
- Poojappura Radhakrishnan
- T. S. Krishnan
- Biyon
- Sharmilee
