= Aasoo Bane Angaarey =

- Theatrical release poster
- Directed by: Mehul Kumar
- Written by: Anwar Khan (dialogues); Indeevar; Dev Kohli; Payam Sayeedi (lyrics)
- Screenplay by: Keshav Rathod; Anwar Khan
- Story by: Mehul Kumar
- Produced by: Jatti K. Verma
- Starring: Jeetendra; Madhuri Dixit; Deepak Tijori
- Cinematography: Rusi Billimoria
- Edited by: Yusuf Sheikh
- Music by: Rajesh Roshan
- Release date: 31 December 1993
- Running time: 151 minutes
- Country: India
- Language: Hindi

Aasoo Bane Angaarey (transl. Tears Have Become Flames) is a 1993 Hindi-language drama film, produced by Jatti K. Varma under the Paramount Pictures banner and directed by Mehul Kumar. It stars Jeetendra, Madhuri Dixit, Deepak Tijori and music composed by Rajesh Roshan. Madhuri Dixit played a double role as both mother and daughter and her performance was appreciated; despite the film not being a commercial success. Dixit played a similar mother and daughter double role a year earlier in Sangeet; her performance in that film was also acclaimed.

== Plot ==
After the death of his first wife, Mr. Verma, the managing director his own firm, remarries Durga, so that she can look after his son, Ravi Verma. She actually seems to have a good relationship with both him and Ravi. Subsequently, Durga also gets pregnant and gives birth to a son Kiran Verma. After a few years as Mr. Verma passes away, Durga decides to enter into politics with the help of Sewakram. Ravi takes over from his father as the managing director of his firm and instantly falls in love with a poor girl, Usha after seeing a dance performance of hers, and offers her a typing job in his firm. She initially disagrees to this relationship due to their status differences, but Ravi still disregards this. Durga also disagrees with the marriage due to the same reason reminding him of how his rich father married his mother, who was also a typist. But later she falsely agrees so she can win the hearts of the poor to vote for her for her upcoming election as the state's chief minister. Usha then loves Ravi a lot. After the marriage, Durga stands for election and wins to become the state's Chief Minister. Usha once overhears the actual reason why Durga agreed to her and Ravi's marriage which saddens her, but she hides this from others. Meanwhile, she also becomes pregnant, where Durga doesn't seem focused on it, especially once in front of Usha and Ravi, which shocks them since she's busy receiving calls from other politicians for her election victory. Ravi, for his business-related work, has to travel to London, England after initially disagreeing to leave Usha alone in a situation where she's pregnant. But he believes his mother will take good care of her. Kiran tells his mother that he has had an affair with Usha before she married Ravi, which is apparently false. Shocked with this, Durga decides to deal with this situation. Usha falls prey to Durga, Kiran and Sewakram and is thrown out of the house after Kiran falsely accuses her of seducing him. Ravi arrives back home and also disowns her after finding it hard to believe she "stooped so low". Along with this, Usha's mother and sister who was attempted to be raped by Kiran once in Ravi's office with the scene slightly in front of Usha are burnt to death in their house by Kiran and his friend and helper. They also try to kill Usha and her unborn baby, but they miraculously survive after the baby is born and live with a kind-hearted taxi driver Hamid who lost his right leg because of Kiran and his helper and helped Usha and her daughter Madhu survive. Usha forgets her in-laws and Ravi and begins a new life. Hamid becomes close to Usha and Madhu. Years later, he dies and Madhu now a young woman and college student who is a duplicate of her mom find out from Sewakram about her family and her mother's past life. Thus she plans for revenge on her paternal grandmother and uncle for what they did to her mother. She pretends to be someone else by entering the Verma household, where only her loving father remembers her mother's face after she becomes a typist in his firm. She also quickly wins their hearts and becomes their secretary to help them in any matter. Part of her revenge also includes falsely accusing Kiran of seducing her and this what makes Ravi wonder after Kiran mentions of what actually they did to Usha. Later they find out who she is as her revenge is completed. She tells her mother this, who becomes angry. Miraculously, Ravi comes to their home and he and Usha reunite lovingly. But Madhu hates him as he never searched for her over the years. So Ravi tells her about what his mother and brother did to Usha and Sewakram was a part of telling her everything so he can gain the Verma business firm. Shocked, Madhu takes revenge on him along with her dad and Durga and Kiran realize their grave mistake of hurting Usha. Madhu also falls in love with Kiran's initially poor brother-in-law Chandra, who lives in the Verma household after his initially poor sister, a teacher Chanda suddenly married him after Usha was thrown out of the house. Durga and Ravi also initially disagreed to this marriage due to status differences. Kiran is run over by Sewakram and Sewakram is killed by Shyam Sundar, Ravi's paternal uncle and husband of his aunt Radha, who left the Verma house after Kiran's marriage. He was also the only one to believe in Usha's innocence after she was falsely accused of seducing Kiran. Before dying, Kiran sadly confesses lying about Usha to his mother about their affair and she seducing him on the day she was thrown out. His death is honored by everyone in the Verma household, who all forgive him and finally reunite.

== Cast ==
- Jeetendra as Ravi Verma
- Madhuri Dixit as Usha / Madhu (Double Role)
- Deepak Tijori as Chandar
- Prem Chopra as Sewakram
- Bindu as Durga Verma
- Aruna Irani as Radha
- Anupam Kher as Shyam Sundar
- Kiran Kumar as Kiran Verma
- Archana Puran Singh as Chanda
- Suresh Oberoi as Hamid
- Johnny Lever as Janu
- Arun Mathur as Doctor
- A. K. Agnihotri
- Feroz Bagban

== Soundtrack ==
The music was composed by Rajesh Roshan. Lyrics were written by Indeevar, Dev Kohli and Payam Sayeedi.

Song	Singer
"Deewane Yeh Ladke Kudiyon Pe Marte Hai"	Kavita Krishnamurthy, Amit Kumar
"Ganpati Bappa"	Lata Mangeshkar
"Dil Bas Mein Nahin"	Asha Bhosle
"Tujhe Dekhke"	Sadhana Sargam
"Teri Raashi Ke Lakhon Hain"	Sadhana Sargam, Debashish Dasgupta
