= Kranti (2002 film) =

2002 Indian film by Naresh Malhotra

- Directed by: Naresh Malhotra
- Written by: Sanjay Masoom (dialogues)
- Story by: N. Maharajan
- Produced by: Vivek Kumar
- Starring: Vinod Khanna; Bobby Deol; Ameesha Patel; Rati Agnihotri; Kabir Bedi
- Cinematography: Nirmal Jani
- Edited by: Naresh Malhotra
- Music by: Jatin–Lalit
- Production company: Vicky Films
- Release date: 8 March 2002
- Running time: 133 minutes
- Country: India
- Language: Hindi

Kranti is a 2002 Indian Hindi-language action drama film directed by Naresh Malhotra. It stars Vinod Khanna, Bobby Deol, Ameesha Patel, Rati Agnihotri and Kabir Bedi.

== Plot ==
The film is about an honest cop, Abhay Pratap Singh, and his father, Awadesh Pratap Singh. Abhay defies conventional methods to nab criminals and, for this reason, has frequent arguments with his father. Sanjana enters Abhay's life as a student who is writing a thesis on an honest cop. She falls in love with Abhay and follows him everywhere. This lands her in trouble as she gets shot by a criminal whom Abhay is pursuing. She survives, but Abhay tracks the mastermind behind the criminal, Mahendra Singh Rana. Rana is a wealthy industrialist who has ties with politicians and tries to slow down Abhay in his chase. He takes advantage of Abhay's confrontations with his father and sets up the father against his son. However, Awadesh soon realizes Rana's tricks and reconciles with Abhay. Abhay manages to kill Rana and restore peace in the city.

== Cast ==
- Vinod Khanna as Police Commissioner Awadesh Pratap Singh
- Bobby Deol as Assistant Commissioner of Police Officer Abhay Pratap Singh
- Ameesha Patel as Sanjana Roy
- Rati Agnihotri as Sushma Singh
- Kabir Bedi as Mahendra Singh Rana
- Pallavi Kulkarni as Anu Singh
- Dalip Tahil as Home Minister Sharatchandra Aghase
- Arun Bakshi as Labour Minister Pachpute
- Yunus Parvez as Chief Minister
- Madan Jain as Inspector Pawar
- Om Puri as Colonel Krishnakant (special appearance)
- Gavin Packard as Shiva
- Dinyar Contractor as Judge, who meets Awdesh Pratap Singh in the morning while jogging
- Syed Badr-ul Hasan Khan Bahadur as Mr. Mehra
- Veeru Krishnan as Police Inspector Ghorpade
- Tiku Talsania as Police Inspector Lele
- Jeetu Verma
- Dinesh Hingoo as Retail Store Owner
- Tej Sapru as John
- Raj Zutshi as Terrorist
- Shiva Rindani as Zafardari
- Rana Jung Bahadur as Sher Singh

== Soundtrack ==
The songs are written by Anand Bakshi, while the songs are composed by Jatin–Lalit. The soundtrack is available on Universal Music India.

Song	Singer
"Dil Mein Dard Sa"	Udit Narayan, Alka Yagnik
"Ishq Jadu Ishq Tona"	Amit Kumar, Sunidhi Chauhan
"O Naukar Sarkari"	Alka Yagnik, Udit Narayan
"Mera Dil Tu"	Shaan, Sunidhi Chauhan
"Hayo Rabba"	Sonu Nigam, Kavita Krishnamurthy
"Jung Ho Ya Pyar"	Asha Bhosle
