= Nafrat Ki Aandhi =

1989 film directed by Mehul Kumar

- Theatrical release poster
- Directed by: Mehul Kumar
- Written by: Anwar Khan (dialogues); Indeevar & Anjaan (lyrics)
- Produced by: Ratan Irani
- Starring: Dharmendra; Jeetendra; Anita Raj; Madhavi
- Cinematography: Sushil Chopra
- Edited by: Yusuf Shaikh
- Music by: Bappi Lahiri
- Production company: Shree Jagdamba Movies Combines
- Release date: 17 March 1989
- Country: India
- Language: Hindi

Nafrat Ki Aandhi (transl. Storm Of Hatred) is a 1989 Hindi-language action film, Produced by Ratan Irani on Shree Jagdamba Movies Combines banner and directed by Mehul Kumar. It stars Dharmendra, Jeetendra, Anita Raj, Madhavi in lead roles and music composed by Bappi Lahiri.

== Plot ==
Inspector Ravi Kapoor (Jeetendra) is an honest Police Officer, transferred back to the city after 5 years, Chandi Das Khurana (Amrish Puri) a smuggler & gangster, his younger brother Chotu (Shakti Kapoor) and his gang have old enmity with Ravi. Sonu Dada (Dharmendra) who is in line of crime runs a club which is closed by Ravi & arrests him, Sonu gets angry on Ravi for always quarreling with him, Chandi Das want to take advantage of it, one day when they are fighting with each other he plans to kill Ravi and trap Sonu in the case, but Ravi saves Sonu in the fight from then onwards they become good friends, Sonu changes his lifestyle & way of living and starts a mechanic shop. Ravi arrests Chandi Das and his gang red-handed with the help of Sonu and sends them to 6 years of imprisonment. Sonu loves Radha (Anita Raj) & Ravi's loves Geeta (Madhavi) they marry them on the same day, both of them blessed with a male child on the same day and they all live very happily for 6 years. After 6 years, Chandi Das & his gang is released from jail and they want to take revenge against Ravi & Sonu. One day Ravi is appointed on a special duty to safeguard valuable antic jewelers, Chandi Das want to acquire those jewelers so he kidnaps Ravi & Sonu's children and asks Ravi to get that Jewelers but Ravi doesn't surrender to them so they will kill Sonu's child as warning, Radha also dies to see the death of her child. Sonu becomes a fire and wants to take revenge against Chandi Das & his gang even though Ravi tries to stop him but Sonu doesn't listen to him because he lost everything in the life, he starts killing Chandi Das gang members one by one. There Ravi makes a plan to catch them he agrees to give the jewelers to Chandi Das but they keep him in their custody at the same time Sonu saves him, Ravi and Sonu both joins sees the end of Chandi Das but Sonu sacrifices his life to protect Ravi's child.

== Cast ==
- Dharmendra as Sonu
- Jeetendra as Inspector Ravi Kapoor
- Jagdish Raj as Police Commissioner Nath
- Anita Raj as Radha
- Madhavi as Geeta
- Shakti Kapoor as Shaktidas Khurana "Chhotu"
- Amrish Puri as Chandidas Khurana
- Firoz Irani as Dhanpat
- Adi Irani as Vikrant
- Asrani as Constable Naamdar
- Neeta Puri as Dancer in He-Man song
- Gavin Packard in He-Man from the song of the same name

== Soundtrack ==
Song	Singer
"Chahiye He Man"	Sapna Mukherjee
"Aaj Bawariya Hui"	Anupama Deshpande
"Sapna Sapna Apna Hai"	Nitin Mukesh, Shabbir Kumar, Chandrani Mukherjee
"Kal Dekhe The (Sad)"	Shabbir Kumar
"Kaise Tum Thanedar"	Asha Bhosle
