= Sathiyo Chalyo Khodaldham =

- Poster
- Directed by: Samir Jagot
- Written by: Yogesh Mehta
- Produced by: Mihir Patel
- Starring: Apoorva Arora; Leena Jumani; Ujjwal Rana; Sheela Sharma; Mukesh Rawal
- Cinematography: Suryakant Tyagi
- Edited by: Sameer Vaishnav; Gaurav R Badrakiya; Pushkar Joshi
- Music by: Pankaj Bhatt
- Distributed by: MKG Films
- Release date: 11 July 2014
- Running time: 125 minutes
- Country: India
- Language: Gujarati
- Budget: ₹8.0 million (US$83,000)

Sathiyo Chalyo Khodaldham (Gujarati: સાથિયો ચાલ્યો ખોડલધામ) is a 2014 Gujarati drama film directed by Samir Jagot and produced by Mihir Patel. The film is about a family who believes in Leuva Patel goddess Khodiyar.

== Plot ==
A family consisting of Karshanbhai Patel, his wife Shantaben, son Amar, daughter-in-law Arushi, and daughter Ami is living happily. Their worker Raghu Kaka and Raghu's wife Radha are also treated as family. Ami is treated as the center of the family. She is too lively, a very good dancer, and she is the heart of family. The story is centered around the family.

== Cast ==
- Apoorva Arora as Ami Patel
- Leena Jumani as Arushi Patel
- Ujjwal Rana as Amar Patel
- Sheela Sharma as Shantaben Patel
- Mukesh Rawal as Karshanbhai Patel
- Prasiddhi Mhatre as Dr. Madhavi
- Chaitainya Bhatt as Dr. Manoj
- Babul Bhavsar as Raghu Kaka
- Hemal Dave as Radha
- Milan Trivedi as Mamadiyo Charan
- Rupal Vasavada as Devalde

== Production ==
=== Development ===
The film's director Samir Jagot has directed more than 50 television advertisements. He has assisted Partho Ghosh, Krishna Raghav, Lekh Tandon, Shyam Benegal with the movie Zubeiedaa prior to this film. The film had been planned for two years but Jagot was not satisfied with the story. After a year he started to work on casting. It was finished within three months. Later, Jayesh Tank and Kalpak Rupani joined the team as executive producers.

=== Filming ===
Filming began in January 2014. Shooting locations included Shreeji Bungalow, Rathod Hospital, Ethnic Pharmaceutical and Khodaldham (Kagvad). The total filming schedule was 22 days including choreography. The entire movie shot in Rajkot City, Lodhika Village and Kagvad Khodaldham.

== Soundtrack ==
Sathiyo Chalyo Khodaldham

Soundtrack album by Hitesh Ranpura-Rakesh Desai & Pankaj Bhatt
- Recorded: Vraj Studio - Rajkot
- Genre: Feature film soundtrack
- Length: 30:38
- Label: Shiwambica Entertainments
- Producer: Mihir Patel

Track list
No.	Title	Lyrics	Music	Artist(s)	Length
1.	"Sathiyo Chalyo Khodaldham"	Ram Manohar	Hitesh Ranpura-Rakesh Desai	Aman Trikha, Kinjal Parmar	6:48
2.	"Ghela Ghela Juvaniya"	Yogesh Mehta		Rajiv Shrimali	1:37
3.	"Sona Dandi"	Ram Manohar	Hitesh Ranpura-Rakesh Desai		4:51
4.	"Jaanbai Jone Khodal Kehvani"	Ram Manohar	Hitesh Ranpura-Rakesh Desai	Kinjal Parmar, Niraj	5:08
5.	"Ashro Taro"	Charan Hamir	Pankaj Bhatt		5:04
