= Awwal Number =

- Promotional poster
- Directed by: Dev Anand
- Written by: Dev Anand
- Produced by: Dev Anand
- Starring: Dev Anand; Aamir Khan; Ekta Sohini; Aditya Pancholi; Neeta Puri
- Music by: Bappi Lahiri
- Release date: 11 May 1990
- Running time: 143 mins
- Country: India
- Language: Hindi

Awwal Number (transl. Number One) is a 1990 Indian Hindi-language sports action film produced and directed by Dev Anand. It stars Dev Anand, Aamir Khan, Ekta Sohini, Aditya Pancholi, and Neeta Puri in pivotal roles.

== Plot ==
A new star, Sunny, has been included in the team in place of another famous star, Ronny. The fame and hype of the new star create hatred in the heart of Ronny against Sunny, although Sunny respects him. Ronny decides to take revenge on Sunny; meanwhile, a terrorist decides to put a bomb in the field where a match is to be organised between India and Australia.

DIG Vikram Singh discovers the terrorists' plan and foils the attack, saving thousands of lives. Sunny also becomes a star by playing a match-winning stroke for the country.

== Cast ==
- Dev Anand as DIG Vikram Singh "Vicky"
- Aamir Khan as Sunny
  - Aftab Shivdasani as Young Sunny
- Ekta Sohini as Aarti
- Aditya Pancholi as Ranveer Singh "Rony"
- Neeta Puri as Maria
- Kulbhushan Kharbanda as Kundi
- Sudhir Pandey as Sundaram
- Vikram Gokhale as Sadhu Singh
- Parikshit Sahni as Selection Committee Member Ajay Mehra
- Ram Mohan as Selection Committee Member Baburao Pakett
- Anjan Srivastav as Cricket Commentator Nekchand Murthy
- Bharat Bhushan as Sunny's Grandfather
- Birbal as Chhaganlal
- Sameer Khakkar as Terrorist
- Raj Kishore as Bartender Darpan
- Mac Mohan as Mani
- Cindy Crawford as Vicky's step mother
- Subbiraj as Police Commissioner Patil
- Ajit Vachani as Police Inspector Teja

== Soundtrack ==
The music was composed By Bappi Lahiri and the lyrics were by Amit Khanna. Voices given by Asha Bhosle, Amit Kumar, Bappi Lahiri, Udit Narayan and S. Janaki.

| Song | Singer |
|---|---|
| "Awwal Number" | Bappi Lahiri |
| "Laakhon Mein Aankhon Mein" | Bappi Lahiri, S. Janaki, Udit Narayan |
| "Yeh Hai Cricket, Yeh Hai Cricket" | Amit Kumar, Bappi Lahiri, Udit Narayan |
| "Poochho Na Kaisa" | Amit Kumar, S. Janaki |
| "Chum Chum Chum" | Amit Kumar |
| "Tere Liye Haan" | Asha Bhosle |

== Production ==
Aamir Khan and his father were admirers of Dev Anand and Aamir quoted in an interview after Dev Anand's death: "The only film I signed without reading the script was Awwal Number." Anand had initially offered the role of Ranvir Singh to cricketer Imran Khan.
