= Allari Pidugu =

2005 Indian film by Jayanth C. Paranjee

- Movie Poster
- Directed by: Jayanth C. Paranjee
- Written by: Paruchuri Brothers
- Produced by: M. R. V. Prasad
- Starring: Nandamuri Balakrishna; Katrina Kaif; Charmy Kaur
- Cinematography: Ajayan Vincent
- Edited by: Marthand K. Venkatesh
- Music by: Mani Sharma
- Production company: P. B. R. Art Productions
- Release date: 5 October 2005
- Running time: 171 minutes
- Country: India
- Language: Telugu

Allari Pidugu (transl. Naughty Thunder) is a 2005 Indian Telugu-language action film directed by Jayanth C. Paranjee and produced by M. R. V. Prasad under the P. B. R. Art Productions banner. The film stars Nandamuri Balakrishna in dual role, Katrina Kaif, and Charmy Kaur, while Puneet Issar and Mukesh Rishi play supporting roles. The music was composed by Mani Sharma with cinematography by Ajayan Vincent and editing by Marthand K. Venkatesh. The film released on 5 October 2005 and was a flop at the box office.

== Plot ==
It revolves around identical twin brothers, Ranjith and Giri (both played by Nandamuri Balakrishna), whose lives take vastly different paths after their father, upright military officer Major Chakravarthy (Puneet Issar), is falsely imprisoned for 14 years by a corrupt mafia don and politician named GK (Mukesh Rishi). While Ranjith grows up to become a disciplined, honest Assistant Commissioner of Police who falls for Swati (Katrina Kaif), Giri remains a carefree, mischievous village youth in love with his cousin Subbalakshmi (Charmy Kaur). When Chakravarthy is finally released and Ranjith begins dismantling GK’s illegal arms-smuggling empire, the vengeful kingpin targets their family and threatens hundreds of innocent lives. Seeing his family in peril, the seemingly irresponsible Giri rises to the occasion, joining forces with his brother to defeat GK, save the innocent, and finally earn his estranged father's respect.

== Cast ==
- Nandamuri Balakrishna in a dual role as
  - ACP Ranjeet Kumar; Giri's elder brother
  - Giri Kumar; Ranjeet's younger brother
- Katrina Kaif as Swati
- Charmy Kaur as Subbalakshmi
- Puneet Issar as Major Chakravarthy
- Mukesh Rishi as G. K.
- Rahul Dev as J. K.
- Subbaraju as Shankar
- Paruchuri Venkateswara Rao as Venkatachalam
- Chandra Mohan as Chandram, Ranjeet's father
- Suhasini Maniratnam as Meenakshi Iyer, Ranjeet's mother
- Prakash Raj as Prakash, Giri's father
- Janaki Sabesh as Rajyalakshmi, Giri's mother
- Kavitha as Kaveri, Subbalakshmi's mother
- Brahmanandam as Bangaraju, Ranjeet and Giri's friend
- Kota Srinivasa Rao as Veeraraju, Subbalakshmi's father
- Ahuti Prasad as Raghavendra
- Chalapathi Rao as Krishnam Raju
- Gundu Hanumantha Rao as Hanumantha
- Tanikella Bharani as Narayana Murthy, Swati's father
- Sumitra as Janaki, Swati's mother
- Geetha Singh as Soundarya
- Raghu Babu as Raghu
- Subbaraya Sharma as Viswamitra
- AVS as Sivarama Krishna
- Banerjee as Banerjee
- Pruthvi Raj as Subrahmanyam
- Vijaya Rangaraju
- Raghunath Reddy
- Thotapalli Madhu
- Ananth
- Vimala Sri
- Rathi
- Jaya Vani
- Ramya Chowdary

== Soundtrack ==
Allari Pidugu

Film score by Mani Sharma
- Released: 8 August 2005
- Genre: Soundtrack
- Length: 31:17
- Label: Aditya Music
- Producer: Mani Sharma

Mani Sharma chronology
Athadu (2005)	Allari Pidugu (2005)	Jai Chiranjeeva (2005)

Music composed by Mani Sharma. Music released on ADITYA Music Company.

No.	Title	Lyrics	Singer(s)	Length
1.	"Dikki Dikki"	Bhaskarabhatla	Karthik, Chitra	5:44
2.	"Mallellona Illaira"	Veturi	Karthik, Sujatha	4:41
3.	"Chinukulaaga"	Kandikonda	Ranjith, Suchitra	5:19
4.	"Maa Subbalachamma"	Veturi	S. P. Balasubrahmanyam, Sunitha	5:03
5.	"Ongolu Githaro"	Jaladanki	S. P. Balasubrahmanyam, Mahalakshmi Iyer	4:57
6.	"Nede Eenade"	Sahiti	Mallikarjun, Sri Vardhini	5:18
Total length:				31:17
