= Lahu Ke Do Rang (1997 film) =

1997 film by Mehul Kumar

Lahoo Ke Do Rang
- Film poster
- Directed by: Mehul Kumar
- Written by: Anwar Khan (dialogue); Mehul Kumar (screenplay)
- Produced by: A.G. Nadiadwala
- Starring: Naseeruddin Shah; Akshay Kumar; Karishma Kapoor; Suresh Oberoi; Sheeba
- Cinematography: Russi Billimoria
- Edited by: Yusuf Shaikh
- Music by: Anand–Milind
- Distributed by: A.G. Films
- Release date: 21 March 1997
- Country: India
- Language: Hindi
- Budget: ₹5.50 crore
- Box office: ₹9.35 crore

Lahoo Ke Do Rang is a 1997 Hindi suspense-action film directed by Mehul Kumar, starring Naseeruddin Shah, Akshay Kumar, Karishma Kapoor and Suresh Oberoi. This was Akshay Kumar and Naseeruddin Shah's second film together; the first being the 1994 film Mohra.

== Plot ==
Customs Officer, Bharat Srivastav lives a mediocre life with his sister Rajni, wife Sangita, and his son. Rajni is to be married to Inspector Gautam who is known for his unorthodox methods of apprehending smugglers. These methods land him in trouble with the Shikari brothers (Dharma, Teja, Tinnu, Chinnu and Pappu). Bharat decides to oppose the brothers, and as a result, the three recruit false eyewitnesses, pay them to give false testimonies, and get the complaint discharged. When Bharat persists, his family is kidnapped and subsequently killed. Bharat manages to kill some of the culprits, but is arrested, found guilty, and sentenced to life in prison. On the way to the prison facility, a vehicle carrying Bharat is involved in an accident, killing everyone on board. Relieved at the death of their nemesis, the Shikari brothers celebrate – only to find out that they now face an unknown enemy who proceeds to kill them all.

== Cast ==
- Naseeruddin Shah as Bharat Srivastav
- Akshay Kumar as Sikandar Davai
- Karishma Kapoor as Hina
- Farah Naaz as Sangita Srivastav
- Mukesh Rawal as Doctor
- Alok Nath as Abu Baba
- Farida Jalal as Halima
- Suresh Oberoi as Dharma Shikari
- Mukesh Rishi as Teja Shikari
- Mahesh Anand as Tinnu Shikari
- Tej Sapru as Chinnu Shikari
- Mushtaq Khan as Pappu Shikari
- Avtaar Gill as Advocate Hassubhai Shah
- K. K. Raj as Sampath, custom officer
- Mulraj Rajda as Judge in Court
- Navin Nischol as DCP A.A. Khan, father of Sikander.
- Aparajita as Mrs. A.A. Khan, mother of Sikander.
- ShashiKala as Chachi
- Dinesh Hingoo as Chandu Tolani
- Tiku Talsania as Kaalu/Kalyendar Swami
- Vishwajeet Pradhan as Inspector Gautam
- Shiva Rindani as Salim Surti

== Soundtrack ==
Lahoo Ke Do Rang

Studio album by Anand–Milind
- Released: 1997
- Recorded: 1996
- Length: Zee Music

Music: Anand-Milind | Lyrics: Sameer Music were very popular songs like "Hasino Ko Aate Hain", "Awara Pagal Deewana" & "Mujhe Paisa Mila"

#	Title	Singer(s)
1.	"Hasino Ko Aate Hain"	Udit Narayan, Alka Yagnik
2.	"Sagar Mein Tarang"	Suresh Wadkar, Sadhana Sargam
3.	"Gazab Seeti Maare"	Poornima
4.	"Awara Pagal Deewana"	Kumar Sanu, Alka Yagnik
5.	"Dil Tumhara Aashiq"	Abhijeet, Alka Yagnik
6.	"Kiska Kasur Hai"	Suresh Wadkar
7.	"Mujhe Paisa Mila"	Kumar Sanu, Alka Yagnik
