= Kitne Door Kitne Paas =

2002 film by Mehul Kumar

- DVD cover
- Directed by: Mehul Kumar
- Written by: Mehul Kumar; Imtiaz Patel; Yunus Sejawal
- Produced by: Mehul Kumar
- Starring: Fardeen Khan; Amrita Arora
- Cinematography: Mazhar Kamran
- Edited by: Yusuf Sheikh
- Music by: Sanjeev Darshan
- Production company: MK Pictures
- Release date: 29 March 2002
- Country: India
- Language: Hindi

Kitne Door Kitne Paas (transl. How far, How near) is a 2002 Indian Hindi-language romantic drama film directed by Mehul Kumar. It stars Fardeen Khan and Amrita Arora.

== Plot ==
Two young Indians, a man named Jatin and a woman named Karishma, meet on an airplane on their way to India. Jatin is returning home to marry Jaya, who has been chosen for him by his mother. Karishma is also returning to India to marry an Indian named Nimesh. Their paths cross, and despite the difference in their temperaments, both are attracted to each other. Both would like to get married but realize and stand by their commitment to Jaya and Nimesh. Also, the parents are against the marriage at first, but then Jaya at the wedding explains how one cannot be forced into marriage, and she didn't want to marry Jatin. A fire then starts, and Jatin saves Karishma and Nimesh, bringing them back out, so her father thinks Jatin is better for her, and Jatin and Karishma get married at the end.

== Cast ==
- Fardeen Khan as Jatin
- Amrita Arora as Karishma Patel
- Nasir Khan as Jaikishen "Jackie"
- Ayub Khan as Nimesh
- Sonali Kulkarni as Jaya Patel
- Satish Shah as Veer Singh / Jeet Singh Rathod / Bhanwar Singh
- Ketki Dave as Koki, Jaya's mother
- Tiku Talsania as Babu Patel
- Govind Namdeo
- Beena as Rama
- Ram Mohan
- Lilette Dubey
- Shehzad Khan as Police Inspector K.K. Limbachia

== Soundtrack ==
Music by Sanjeev Darshan.

#	Title	Singer(s)	Lyricist
1	"Kitne Door Kitne Paas"	Udit Narayan, Kavita Krishnamurthy	Anand Bakshi
2	"Rulati Hain Mohabbatein"	KK	Anwar Sagar
3	"Diwana Dil Hain Mera"	Sonu Nigam, Sunidhi Chauhan	Abbas Tyrewala
4	"Yaar Mein India Chala"	Sonu Nigam, Mohammed Aziz	Anand Bakshi
5	"Ji Jeend Jaan"	Sonu Nigam, Kavita Krishnamurthy	Anand Bakshi
6	"Humko Mohabbat Dhoondh Rahi"	Roop Kumar Rathod, Jayshree Shivram	Anand Bakshi
