= Anokha Bandhan =

1982 film by Mehul Kumar

- Theatrical release poster
- Directed by: Mehul Kumar
- Screenplay by: Bharat Dave
- Story by: Sarat Chandra Chattopadhyay
- Produced by: Ratan Irani
- Starring: Ashok Kumar; Jeetendra; Shabana Azmi; Navin Nischol; Master Bittu
- Cinematography: Baba Azmi
- Edited by: Hussain A. Burmawala
- Music by: Usha Khanna
- Production company: Shree Jagdamba Movies
- Release date: 30 October 1982
- Running time: 139 minutes
- Country: India
- Language: Hindi

Anokha Bandhan (transl. Unique Relation) is a 1982 Hindi-language drama film, produced by Ratan Irani under the Shree Jagdamba Movies banner and directed by Mehul Kumar based on Sharat Chandra Chatterji's book Ramer Sumati (1914). It stars Ashok Kumar, Shabana Azmi, Navin Nischol, Master Bittu while Jeetendra has given a Special Appearance and music composed by Usha Khanna. The film remade as Telugu movie Vadina Maata (1992).

== Cast ==
- Ashok Kumar as Zamindar
- Jeetendra as Haribabu (Guest)
- Shabana Azmi as Annapurna / Anu
- Navin Nischol as Shyamlal
- Satyen Kappu as Doctor
- Jagdeep as Kalyanjibhai Bhojwala
- Mukri as Kalumali
- Shekhar Purohit
- Aruna Irani as Kalyanji's wife
- Shashikala as Anu's mom
- Seema Deo as Ram's mom
- Annapurna Shukla
- Rehana Jariwala
- Master Bittu as Ram

== Soundtrack ==
#	Title	Singer(s)	Lyrics
1	"Haathi Ghoda Palki"	Rajeshwari	Nida Fazli
2	"Nakhre Waali Hamari"	Amit Kumar	Nida Fazli
3	"Piya Tune Apne Rang"	Shabbir Kumar, Asha Bhosle	Asad Bhopali
4	"Ram Lakhan The Do Bhai"	Asha Bhosle	Yogesh Gaud
5	"Ram Tumhi Ne Humko"	Asha Bhosle	Yogesh Gaud
6	"Tu Itni Door Kyun Hai Maa"	Alka Yagnik	Nida Fazli
