= Mehul Kumar =

Indian filmmaker and writer

- Born: Mohammed Ibrahim Baloch; 1 July 1949 (age 77); Jamnagar, Bombay State, India
- Education: Bombay University
- Occupations: Filmmaker, writer, journalist
- Years active: 1977-present
- Children: 3

Mohammed Ibrahim Baloch (born 1 July 1949), better known as Mehul Kumar, is an Indian filmmaker and writer in Bollywood. He is known for directing the films Tirangaa (1993), Krantiveer (1994) and Kohram (1999). His other works include Mrityudaata (1997) and Kitne Door Kitne Paas (2002) among others as well as several Gujarati films.

== Early life and work ==
Mehul Kumar was born as Mohammed Baloch into a Makrani Baloch family in the city of Jamnagar, Gujarat in 1949. Graduating from Bombay University he started as a journalist during the early 1970s which included writing film reviews. He then moved to work in Gujarati theatre.

== Career ==
He made his directorial debut with a Gujarati comedy Chandu Jamadar (1977), a remake of Dada Kondke's highly successful lowbrow Marathi comedy Pandu Havaldar (1975). Though it was Kumar's 1977 bilingual Hindi-Gujarati film Phir Janam Lenge Hum/Janam Janam Na Saathi produced by Tahir Hussain which first gained recognition. After its success, Kumar directed eighteen successful Gujarati films over the years.

Kumar then made his second Hindi project Anokha Bandhan (1982). After that he directed films with actors like Dharmendra, Jeetendra, Anil Kapoor, Meenakshi Sheshadri, Shabana Azmi, Madhuri Dixit, Shatrughan Sinha, Mehmood and Feroz Khan among others.

Then came Kumar's blockbuster golden jubilee hit Marte Dam Tak (1987) which starred Raaj Kumar, Govinda and Farah. Jungbaaz, Nafrat Ki Aandhi and a string of back-to-back films followed in the 1980s. In the '90s he made commercially successful films like Tirangaa (1992) starring Raaj Kumar and Nana Patekar. Then followed Krantiveer (1993) based on the Bombay riots. Krantiveer was a blockbuster with Patekar winning a National Film Award for his performance.

Kumar then directed ABCL's debut venture Mrityudaata (1997) which was Amitabh Bachan's comeback film after five years, but it emerged as a box-office failure. He brought Nana Patekar and Amitabh Bachchan together in Kohram (1999). Although it was commercially unsuccessful as well, it is remembered for the performances of its lead actors. He then made Kitne Door Kitne Paas (2002), which fared well. His next film Jaago (2004) was based on a real life incident and was one of the first films to raise awareness about rape in India. His last film was Krantiveer: The Revolution (2010) starred his daughter Jahan Bloch in the lead role and was a sequel to Krantiveer.

He has also produced some of his films like Tirangaa, Krantiveer, Kohram and Jaago. Other actors which have appeared and collaborated with Kumar on film projects include Dimple Kapadia, Naseeruddin Shah, Akshay Kumar, Raveena Tandon and Karisma Kapoor.

== Personal life and family ==
Kumar runs Mehul Cinemax, a film theatre in Jamnagar owned by his production company Mehul Entertainments Private Limited.

His brother Hussain Bloch is a film director in Gujarati cinema and has also worked with Kumar in many of his films. Kumar's daughter Jahan Bloch appeared as the lead in Krantiveer's sequel Krantiveer: The Revolution (2010). She had previously appeared as a child actress in his films. Having since moved to Prince Edward Island with her chef husband, she now runs a bakery while also working as a filmmaker. His son Zoheb Mohammed Bloch has assisted Kumar as a director in films. He has another daughter Shameem Khan, a costume designer, and a brother production manager Mohamed Bloch; both of whom have worked with Kumar on his films.

== Filmography ==
Year	Title	Language	Notes
2010	Krantiveer: The Revolution	Hindi	Also writer of screenplay, story and dialogues
2004	Jaago	Hindi	Also producer
2002	Kitne Door Kitne Paas	Hindi	Also producer, writer of screenplay and story
1999	Kohram	Hindi	Also producer
1997	Mrityudaata	Hindi	Also writer of screenplay and story
1997	Lahoo Ke Do Rang	Hindi	Also writer of screenplay and story
1994	Krantiveer	Hindi	Also producer
1993	Aasoo Bane Angaarey	Hindi	
1993	Tirangaa	Hindi	Also producer
1991	Paap Ki Aandhi	Hindi	
1991	Meet Mere Man Ke	Hindi	
1989	Na-Insaafi	Hindi	
1989	Jungbaaz	Hindi	Also story writer
1989	Nafrat Ki Aandhi	Hindi	
1989	Asmaan Se Ooncha	Hindi	
1987	Marte Dam Tak	Hindi	
1986	Sayba Mora	Gujarati	
1986	Ujali Meraman	Gujarati	
1985	Bhauji Maay	Maithili	
1985	Meru Malan	Gujarati	
1985	Preet Na Karsho Koi	Gujarati	
1984	Love Marriage	Hindi	
1984	Hiran Ne Kanthe	Gujarati	
1983	Dhola Maru	Gujarati	Also writer
1983	Marad No Mandvo	Gujarati	
1982	Anokha Bandhan	Hindi	
1982	Dholi	Gujarati	
1982	Kanchan Aur Ganga	Hindi	
1982	Maa Vina Soona Sansar	Gujarati	
1982	Naseeb No Khel	Gujarati	
1981	Gamdani Gori	Gujarati	Also writer
1981	Garvi Naar Gujaratan	Gujarati	
1981	Ranchandi	Gujarati	
1979	Rajputani	Gujarati	
1978	Kanchan Ane Ganga	Gujarati	
1977	Chandu Jamadar	Gujarati	
1977	Phir Janam Lenge Hum/Janam Janam Na Saathi	Hindi/Gujarati	Bilingual film
