= Anjaneya (film) =

2003 Indian Tamil film by N. Maharajan

- Theatrical release poster
- Directed by: N. Maharajan
- Written by: N. Maharajan
- Produced by: S. S. Chakravarthy
- Starring: Ajith Kumar; Meera Jasmine
- Cinematography: P. Selvakumar
- Edited by: B. S. Vasu-Saleem
- Music by: Mani Sharma
- Production company: NIC Arts
- Release date: 24 October 2003
- Running time: 174 minutes
- Country: India
- Language: Tamil

Anjaneya (transl. Hanuman) is a 2003 Indian Tamil-language action film written and directed by N. Maharajan, starring Ajith Kumar and Meera Jasmine in the lead roles. The film, produced by S. S. Chakravarthy, had its score and soundtrack composed by Mani Sharma. The film opened on 24 October 2003 on the occasion of Diwali and failed at the box office.

== Plot ==
Paramaguru is an efficient police officer who fights against the scum of the society. He later masquerades as a thief to infiltrate into the underworld. The bad guys are surprised to find that Paramguru is the ACP and is out to get them, so they all gang up against him. In this process, a thrilling encounter takes place between the good and the evil. Paramaguru is helped in his fight against injustice by Divya, who falls in love with him.

== Cast ==
- Ajith Kumar as ACP V. Paramaguru IPS
- Meera Jasmine as Divya
- Raghuvaran as Venkateswaran, Paramaguru's father
- Jaya Prakash Reddy as Jaya Prakash
- FEFSI Vijayan as Vettu Ramasamy
- Ramesh Khanna as Kolair
- Seetha as Prabhakaran's mother
- Kovai Sarala as Old Thief
- Adithya Menon as Siva
- P. Vasu as DGP
- Anu Hasan as Anu, Paramaguru's sister
- Ilavarasu as Eshwarapandiyan, Paramaguru's uncle
- Mohan Raman as Divya's father, Advocate
- Pyramid Natarajan as 5 lakhs vote Minister
- Girish Karnad as Retired Judge
- Mansoor Ali Khan as Contractor
- Vijay Krishnaraj as Lawyer
- Ponnambalam as SI Veerappan
- Besant Ravi as Jaya Prakash's henchman
- Mahanadi Shankar as Kulithalai Samy
- Thalaivasal Vijay as Government Employee
- Vietnam Veedu Sundaram as Paramaguru's neighbour
- Manivannan as Paramaguru's neighbour
- Kalairani as Paramaguru's neighbour
- Rajesh as Education officer
- Pandu as Police officer
- Nizhalgal Ravi as Education officer
- Peeli Sivam as Education officer
- LIC Narasimhan as Judge
- Sampath Ram as Palani Mani
- Ravikanth as DC
- Vinu Chakravarthy as Police officer
- Scissor Manohar as Minister's assistant
- Crane Manohar as Protester
- Chaplin Balu as Paramaguru's friend
- Nellai Siva as Police officer
- Nitish Veera as Paramaguru's friend
- Rathi special appearance in "Pavadai" song

== Production ==
The leading female role was handed to Meera Jasmine even though Reema Sen was also approached earlier for the film. The film featured Ajith Kumar in his first role as a police officer. The film was shot within 47 days, with Ajith reportedly working extra time to complete scenes. Producers downplayed any publicity for the film, releasing the audio with little fanfare and not releasing a teaser trailer.

== Soundtrack ==
The soundtrack was composed by Mani Sharma.

No.	Title	Lyrics	Singer(s)	Length
1.	"Agap Porula"	Kabilan	P. Unnikrishnan, Sujatha	5:52
2.	"Ovvoru Naalum"	Kabilan	Tippu, Chorus	6:05
3.	"Paavadai Panjavarnam"	Kabilan	Shankar Mahadevan, Chorus	5:15
4.	"Paisa Gopuram"	Vairamuthu	Karthik, Anuradha Sriram	5:30
5.	"Vennila Vennila"	Vairamuthu	Udit Narayan, Harini	6:04
Total length:				28:46

== Reception ==
Malathi Rangarajan from The Hindu wrote, "The lack of consistency in the treatment affects the film [to] no end. Ajit, the roly-poly hero, could have tried to give an intelligent slant to the portrayal. He doesn't", and criticised Maharajan's direction. Malini Mannath of Chennai Online wrote, "What Anjaneya suffers from is a weak script, a narration that goes off the tangent many a time, and too many characters making their entries with nothing substantial to do, particularly in the second half of the film". The film performed poorly at the box office, which Ajith attributed to over-expectations of audiences. Rajasekhar had bought the Telugu remake rights to the film a month before it was released.
