= Aashiq (2001 film) =

2001 Indian film by Indra Kumar

- Directed by: Indra Kumar
- Written by: Anwar Khan (dialogues)
- Screenplay by: Rajeev Kaul, Praful Parekh
- Story by: Krishna Vamsi
- Based on: Gulabi by Krishna Vamsi
- Produced by: Anil Sharma
- Starring: Bobby Deol; Karisma Kapoor
- Cinematography: Harmeet Singh
- Edited by: Sanjay Sankla
- Music by: Sanjeev–Darshan
- Production company: Shweta International
- Distributed by: Eros Entertainment
- Release date: 26 January 2001
- Running time: 160 minutes
- Country: India
- Language: Hindi
- Budget: ₹9 crore
- Box office: ₹18.75 crore

Aashiq (English: The Lover) is a 2001 Indian Hindi action romance film directed by Indra Kumar. The film stars Bobby Deol and Karisma Kapoor. It is a remake of the 1995 Telugu film Gulabi.

The film premiered on 26 January 2001 in Mumbai. It was declared "average" by Box Office India.

== Plot ==
Chander helps his friend marry his lover, Sapna, against Sapna's brother, Inspector Mathur's wishes. Mathur is a suspended police officer. Sapna's friend Pooja is with Sapna when Chander helps Sapna elope. From that moment on, Pooja falls madly in love with Chander. The elopement enrages Mathur, who harbours a grudge against Chander and tries to get him arrested at any opportunity.

Pooja lives in a big house with unloving parents. Every time her parents meet, they argue and fight. Pooja begins calling Chander anonymously on the phone and calls herself "dream girl" and flirts with him, making him happy and curious to find out who she is. Chander's widowed father is an advocate and loves his only son. Chander's father helps him to find out who was the "dream girl" by tricking her into coming to the wedding of another man named Chander. Chander is to learn that his dream girl is Pooja; from then on, they start dating.

When Pooja's parents learn about their relationship, they don't approve and force Pooja to get engaged to somebody else. Chander finds out about her wedding arrangements and goes to her house to speak to her father, who starts to abuse Chander and physically assault him, which leads to Chander striking him back when Pooja arrives. This leads to a misunderstanding between Pooja and Chander that causes them to have a fallout, and Chander returns to his home, where Pooja calls him to tell him that she learned the truth and wants to meet him. However, Chander is enraged and does not want to speak to her. Chander's childhood friend Jai takes the call on his behalf and asks her to meet in a deserted area with Chander, to which she agrees.

After Pooja and Jai meet, a gang abducts Pooja as per Jai's instructions, who tricked her and sold her to one of the city's most feared pimps, Baburao. As time passes, Chander misses Pooja after recalling the moments they had together and decides to meet her but is intercepted by Mathur and a squad of policemen and is taken to the police station for interrogation, where Pooja's father reveals that she has been missing for two days. Mathur and his officers try to assault Chander, but he fights back and escapes from the police station. Chander starts searching for Pooja and meets Jai, who tells him that he can help him find her.

Jai contacts Mathur and tries to get Chander arrested in a dance bar. Chander figures out the setup after he sees an earring that he had given to Pooja in Jai's glass, but Jai manages to escape. Jai goes to the police station and requests Mathur for protection and offers his help in apprehending Chander. They send Mathur's informant, Badru, to give Chander the wrong information about Jai's whereabouts. Chander goes there and kicks Jai from behind. It turns out to be Mathur in Jai's clothes who reveals to him that Jai is safe in Badru's house. Chander is surrounded by policemen, but as Mathur knocks off his hat, it turns out to be Jai instead, who was disguised as Chander wearing tall boots and a tape recorder with Chander's voice. He reveals that Chander now knows where Jai really is from a phone that he had with him. Chander eventually finds Jai and beats him in the street and makes Jai take him to the brothel where he sold her. Chander gets involved in a fight with Baburao's men outside the brothel and is stabbed by one of them.

An Arabic man from Dubai had agreed to purchase Pooja for 50 lakh rupees and wants to take her with him from India. Meanwhile, Chander is being treated by his father and friends in Sapna's house when Badru finds out and informs Mathur. When Mathur goes along with his constable Bawander Singh and other policemen to apprehend Chander, he learns that Chander escaped after Bawander Singh had tipped Chander's friends, which infuriates Mathur and leads to Bawander resigning from the job due to Mathur's immorality and vendetta against Chander.

Chander later finds out that Pooja had been taken by the Arabic man and goes to the airport to save her, where she is about to board the plane. However, Chander meets Baburao, who gives him a chance to fight him and take Pooja away. After he beats Baburao in a hard-fought battle, he turns his attention towards Jai when Baburao gets up and tries to shoot Chander; Chander moves away, and the bullet hits Jai's forehead instead and kills him. Baburao tries to shoot Chander again but is shot from behind by Mathur, who seemingly helped Chander, and is met with a sincere salute from Bawander Singh. The movie ends with Pooja and Chander embracing each other.

== Cast ==
- Bobby Deol as Chander "Chandu" Kapoor
- Karishma Kapoor as Pooja Singh
- Nasirr Khan as Jai, Chandu's friend
- Rahul Dev as Baburao, the brothel's owner
- Smita Jaykar as Mrs. Singh, Pooja's mother
- Anupam Kher as Dilip Dev Kapoor
- Mrinal Kulkarni as Sapna Devi
- Anjan Srivastav as Mr. Singh, Pooja's father
- Johnny Lever as Pranat, the dwarfism.
- Dina Pathak as Dai Maa
- Mukesh Rishi as Inspector Mathur, Sapna's brother
- Vrajesh Hirjee as Chandu's friend
- Ashok Saraf as Police Constable
- Kashmira Shah
- Shubha Khote
- Manmauji

== Soundtrack ==
Lyrics: Sameer

#	Title	Singer(s)
1	"O Mere Dholna"	Udit Narayan, Anuradha Paudwal
2	"Aashiq Mujhe Aashiq"	Roop Kumar Rathod, Alka Yagnik
3	"Gore Gore Gaal Mere"	Alka Yagnik
4	"Gori Tera Nakhra"	Alka Yagnik, Udit Narayan
5	"Ched Do"	Udit Narayan
6	"Teri Aankhon Mein"	Alka Yagnik, Udit Narayan
7	"Charche Hain Hamare"	Udit Narayan
8	"Tum Kya Jaano"	Alka Yagnik, Udit Narayan

== Reception ==
=== Box office ===
The fil grossed ₹18.75 crore worldwide.

=== Critical response ===
Taran Adarsh of IndiaFM gave the film one out of five, writing, "On the whole, AASHIQ has a dull script, which will limit its prospects significantly. It will have a bumpy journey at the box-office."Savitha Padmanabhan of The Hindu wrote, " If Indra Kumar's earlier ``Mann was a failed attempt at ``An Affair To Remember, then Aashiq is most definitely an affair to forget!"
