= Indian (2001 film) =

2001 Hindi action movie by N. Maharajan

- Theatrical release poster
- Directed by: N. Maharajan
- Screenplay by: N. Maharajan
- Dialogues by: Sanjay Masoomm
- Story by: N. Maharajan
- Based on: Vallarasu by N. Maharajan
- Produced by: Dharmendra
- Starring: Sunny Deol; Shilpa Shetty; Danny Denzongpa; Raj Babbar; Mukesh Rishi; Rahul Dev
- Cinematography: A. Ramesh Kumar
- Edited by: B. S. Vasu; Saleem
- Music by: Anand Raaj Anand
- Production company: Vijayta Films
- Distributed by: Eros International
- Release date: 26 October 2001
- Running time: 178 minutes
- Country: India
- Language: Hindi
- Budget: ₹15 crore
- Box office: ₹42.60 crore

Indian is a 2001 Indian Hindi-language action thriller film directed by N. Maharajan and produced by Dharmendra under Vijayta Films. A remake of the director's own Tamil film Vallarasu, the film stars Sunny Deol, Shilpa Shetty and Danny Denzongpa in pivotal roles, along with Raj Babbar, Mukesh Rishi and Rahul Dev.

Indian was released on 26 October 2001 with excellent box office reports, grossing a domestic net of ₹18 million on its opening day. Made on a budget of ₹150 million, it was a commercial success at the box office, earning over ₹540 million worldwide. It was the fourth highest-grossing Hindi film of 2001, with a net gross of ₹280 million.

== Plot ==
The story centres on the unwavering moral code and relentless pursuit of justice by DCP Rajshekhar Singh Azad, a highly decorated and incorruptible police officer. Rajshekhar is a devoted family man living with his loving wife, Anjali, and their two children, a portrait of an ideal citizen balancing duty with domestic life. The central conflict ignites when Rajshekhar successfully arrests the notorious terrorist Wasim Khan, a terrorist whose activities are aimed at destabilizing India.

However, the layers of corruption begin to peel back, revealing a sinister nexus that connects the terrorist to powerful figures within the establishment. Azad's investigation soon implicates the influential industrialist Shankar Singhania as the mastermind, who is using Wasim Khan just as a pawn to further his own vested interests in creating chaos. Another devastating revelation for Rajshekhar is the shocking discovery that his own father-in-law, the high-ranking officer DGP Surya Pratap Singh, is also working for Shankar Singhania, having succumbed to the web of greed and power.

Driven by his fierce commitment to the nation above all else, Rajshekhar is forced to take the extreme and tragic step of eliminating his father-in-law. This devastating act shatters his personal life, leading his wife, Anjali, to leave him, believing he has murdered her father for no justifiable reason. She later files for a divorce from him. Rajshekhar, now estranged from his family but undeterred in his mission, continues his brutal campaign to cleanse the system. He executes Wasim Khan, but the true kingpin, Shankar Singhania, remains at large and protected by his vast resources and connections.

Rajshekhar, unable to fight the entrenched corruption solely through official channels, takes on the mantle of a vigilante. He gathers and mobilizes a group of patriotic, yet disillusioned, youths — those who had previously failed to gain entry into the police force but share his deep commitment to the country. Together, they form an unofficial task force dedicated to eliminating the enemies of the state. In a climactic showdown, Rajshekhar manages to corner and kill the kingpin, Shankar Singhania, thus dismantling the entire conspiracy.

The film concludes on a redemptive note when Anjali finally learns the truth about her father's betrayal and Rajshekhar’s sacrifice, leading her to reconcile with her husband, whose actions, though morally complex, were driven by the ultimate duty to protect the country.

== Cast ==
- Sunny Deol as DCP Rajshekhar Azad / "Raj"
- Shilpa Shetty as Anjali Singh Azad – Rajshekhar’s wife
- Danny Denzongpa as Shankar Singhania
- Mukesh Rishi as Wasim Khan/Allah Baksh – Shankar's associate
- Rahul Dev as Pratap Sinha
- Raj Babbar as DGP Surya Pratap Singh – Anjali's father, Rajshekhar's father-in-law
- Surendra Pal as DGP
- Om Puri as CBI officer Joginder Singh
- Rana Jung Bahadur as Havildar Mushtaq Singh
- Deepak Shirke as Politician Veer Bahadur Singh
- Rajat Bedi as Sanjay Singhania – Shankar's son
- Ali Khan as Tiger
- Salim Ghouse as Francis
- Avtar Gill as Advocate Gill
- Dinesh Hingoo as Jewellery shop owner
- Sanjay Narvekar as Rahim
- Balvinder Singh Suri as Balvinder
- Shakti Kapoor as Bhaijaan – Restaurant owner
- Reema Lagoo as Mrs. Suryapratap Singh – Anjali's mother, Rajshekhar's mother-in-law
- Viju Khote as Inspector Deshmukh
- Shiva Rindani as Inspector Patil
- Pramod Muthu as ACP Moutho
- K. D. Sandhu as Politician Madho
- Dhananjay Mandrekar as Inspector
- Dharmesh Tiwari as Imam Saab
- Sophiya Haque as Dancer in the song "Yeh Pyar"
- Malaika Arora as Dancer in the song "Yeh Pyar"
- Ankush Mohite as Inspector Shinde
- Suresh Bhagwat as B.E.S.T. employee

== Production ==
Deol, who usually does not do remakes, saw Vallarasu and loved it. This was his second home production after Dillagi, and while admitting there were no drastic changes made to the script, he revealed the only thing changed was the nativity in order to suit the northern audience."

== Music and soundtrack ==
The music of the film was composed by Anand Raaj Anand and the lyrics of the songs were penned by Anand Bakshi.

Indian

Soundtrack album by Anand Raaj Anand
- Released: 2001
- Genre: Feature film soundtrack
- Label: Universal Music India

Title	Singer(s)
"Waton Walo"	Roop Kumar Rathod
"Deewane"	Shaan, Alka Yagnik
"Yeh Pyar"	Richa Sharma, Sunidhi Chauhan
"Rab Di Kasam"	Udit Narayan, Alka Yagnik
"Jaana Maine"	Abhijeet, Sadhana Sargam
"Thaath Nawabi"	Anand Raaj Anand, Alka Yagnik

== Reception ==
Online Bangalore described that the film will certainly appeal to the majority of the masses. Khalid Mohammed of The Times of India described the film as a "messy bang-a-bang movie."

== Sequel ==
The making of a sequel, to be called Indian 2, and to star Sunny Deol and be directed by Maharajan, was announced in 2018.
