= Rahul Dev =

Indian actor and model (born 1968)

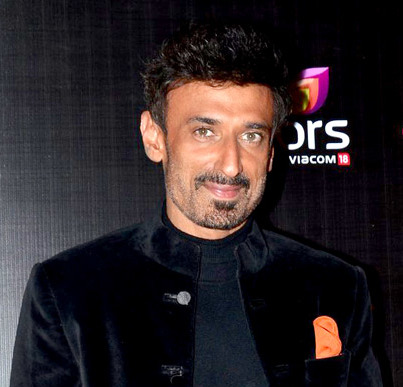
- Rahul Dev in 2014
- Born: Rahul Dev Kaushal; 27 September 1968 (age 58); New Delhi, India
- Education: St. Columba's School
- Occupations: Actor; model
- Years active: 1994–present
- Spouse: Reena Dev (m. 1998; died 2009)
- Partner: Mugdha Godse
- Children: Siddhartha Dev
- Relatives: Mukul Dev (brother)

Rahul Dev Kaushal (born 27 September 1968) is an Indian actor and former model who predominantly works in Hindi, Telugu, Tamil, Kannada, Malayalam, Bengali and Odia language films He also participated in Bigg Boss (Hindi season 10) and was evicted on day 63.

== Early life ==
Rahul Dev Kaushal was born on 27 September 1968 in New Delhi, India into a Punjabi Hindu Brahmin family with ancestral roots in a village in Jalandhar district.

Rahul Dev and his younger brother, Mukul Dev, were born to Hari Dev, who was an Assistant Commissioner of Police. Hari Dev died on April 17, 2019 at the age of 91. Their Punjab-born father had exposed the brothers to Afghan culture and could himself speak both Pashto and Persian.

Dev was educated at the St. Columba's School, Delhi.

Rahul wanted to become a cricketer but later pursued engineering. In 1993, while in his final year of college studying to be an engineer, he was discovered by fashion designer Rohit Khosla, who encouraged him to pursue modeling, a path he chose in 1994. He has also worked with a garment company before establishing his own business.

He also has a sister, Rashmi.

== Career ==
=== Model ===
Dev was one of the top Indian male models of the 1990s, itself considered the best decade for Indian male models. For his professional work he often switched between Delhi and Mumbai, where had moved in 1996. He featured in ad commercials for important brands such as Tata and Raymond as well lifestyle and entertainment magazines.

Dev started his career as a professional model in 1994 and retired from modeling in 2002 to focus more on acting.

=== Actor ===
==== Films ====
Dev made his screen debut in the 2000 film Champion where he played a villainous role for which he was nominated for the 2001 Filmfare Best Villain Award. He then moved into Malayalam cinema, playing the role of an assassin Sheik Imran in Amal Neerad's Sagar Alias Jacky Reloaded. (2009). He also appeared as a villain in the Punjabi movie Dharti in 2011. Two years later, he made a comeback with Sringaravelan. He appeared in Bhojpuri film Dulhan Chahi Pakistan Se 2 in 2018.

==== Television ====
In December 2013, Dev made his television debut, playing the role of the demon Arunasur in the mythological TV series Devon Ke Dev...Mahadev.

== Personal life ==
=== Relationships and family ===
Dev's wife Rina died of cancer on 16 May 2009. The couple had been married for 11 years and have a son, Siddhant. Dev has spoken about the experience of being a single father. As of 2020 he was in a relationship with model and actress Mugdha Godse.

=== Business ventures ===
In 1994, when he became a model, Dev also opened his own company, Rap Overseas, producing and exporting leather garments.

=== Cricket ===
An enthusiast of cricket in his youth, Dev represented Delhi at under-19 level and was coached by the influential Gurcharan Singh.

== Filmography ==
=== Film ===
Key
†	Denotes films that have not yet been released

Year	Title	Role	Language	Notes
2000	Champion	Naseer Ahmed	Hindi	
2001	Aashiq	Baburao	Hindi	
2001	Asoka	Bheema	Hindi	
2001	Indian	Pratap Sinha	Hindi	
2001	Narasimha	Rasool Akhtar	Tamil	
2001	Akasa Veedhilo	Terrorist	Telugu	
2002	Takkari Donga	Shaka	Telugu	
2002	Chalo Ishq Ladaaye	Raja	Hindi	
2002	23 March 1931: Shaheed	Sukhdev	Hindi	
2002	Awara Paagal Deewana	Vikrant Prasad	Hindi	
2003	Parasuram	Shankaran Kutti/Akash	Tamil	
2003	Kyon?	Inspector Aditya Solanki	Hindi	
2003	Supari	Papad	Hindi	
2003	88 Antop Hill	IGP Arvind Khanvilkar	Hindi	
2003	Simhadri	Bala Nair	Telugu	
2003	Footpath	Shekhar Srivastav	Hindi	
2003	Seetayya	Chandra Naidu	Telugu	
2004	Omkara	Khaan	Kannada	
2004	Agnipankh	Vishal	Hindi	Lead role
2004	Bardaasht	Corrupt ACP Yeshwant Thakur	Hindi	Lead role
2004	Aan: Men at Work	Baba Yeda Pathan / Yeda Bhai	Hindi	
2004	Andhrawala	Dhanraj	Telugu	
2004	Mass	Seshu/Shatru	Telugu	
2004	Vidyardhi	Salim Ibrahim	Telugu	
2005	Insan	Azhar Khan/Munna	Hindi	
2005	Narasimhudu	JD's son	Telugu	
2005	Athadu	Sadhu	Telugu	
2005	Mazhai	Deva	Tamil	
2005	Allari Pidugu	J. K.	Telugu	
2005	Jai Chiranjeeva	Asghar	Telugu	
2006	Fight Club – Members Only	Sandy	Hindi	
2006	Asthram	Karim	Telugu	
2006	Jaane Hoga Kya?	Special Investigations Officer Rathore	Hindi	
2006	Kachchi Sadak	Javed Ali	Hindi	
2006	Iqraar by Chance	Sikka	Hindi	
2006	Chinnodu	Sri Sailam	Telugu	
2006	Seetha Raamudu	Ramulu	Telugu	
2006	Sarhad Paar	Bakatawar	Hindi	
2006	Pournami	Veerabhadra	Telugu	
2006	Shree	Shetty	Kannada	
2007	Mahanayak	Ranjit	Odia	
2007	Soundarya	Prakash	Kannada	
2007	Okkadunnadu	Sona Bhai's nephew	Telugu	
2007	Muni	Mastan Bhai	Tamil	
2007	Munna	Aatma	Telugu	
2007	Cape Karma	Manav	Hindi	
2007	Tulasi	Basavaraju	Telugu	
2008	D	Raj	Hindi	
2008	Bindaas	D	Kannada	
2008	Jimmy	ACP Rajeshwar Vyas	Hindi	
2008	Bombaat	Das	Kannada	
2008	Arasangam	Chandru	Tamil	
2008	Mukhbiir	Saaya	Hindi	
2008	Bank		Telugu	
2008	Sankat City	Suleman Supari	Hindi	
2008	Kidnap	Irfan	Hindi	
2008	U Me Aur Hum	Jeetu	Hindi	
2009	Shatru Sanghar	Rahul	Odia	
2009	Mestri		Telugu	
2009	Aa Dekhen Zara	Captain	Hindi	
2009	Kal Kissne Dekha	Marshal	Hindi	
2009	Sweet Heart		Telugu	
2009	Sagar Alias Jackie Reloaded	Sheikh Imran (Sniper)	Malayalam	
2009	Yodha		Kannada	
2009	Aadhavan	Abdul Kulkarni	Tamil	
2009	Blue	Gulshan Samnani	Hindi	
2010	Shaapit	Prof. Pashupathy	Hindi	
2011	Run Bhola Run		Hindi	
2011	Veera	Dhanraj	Telugu	
2011	Dhada	R.D.	Telugu	
2011	Dharti	Natchaar Singh	Punjabi	
2012	Mirza The Untold Story	Jeet	Punjabi	
2012	Lovely	David	Telugu	
2012	Dhammu	Police Officer	Telugu	
2013	Shadow	Jeeva	Telugu	
2013	Naayak	Babji	Telugu	
2013	Sringaravelan	Vikram	Malayalam	
2013	Bhai	Bhavani	Telugu	
2013	Rangbaaz	Lucky Vai	Bengali	
2014	Yevadu	Veeru Bhai	Telugu	
2014	Jaihind 2		Tamil / Telugu / Kannada	Trilingual film
2014	Abhimanyu		Kannada	
2014	Loukyam	Sathya	Telugu	
2015	Ek Paheli Leela	Bhairav	Hindi	
2015	Lailaa O Lailaa	Victor Rana	Malayalam	
2015	10 Endrathukulla	Daksha Bhai	Tamil	
2015	RajadhiRaja	John Tiger	Malayalam	
2015	Vedalam	Rahul	Tamil	
2016	Shikari	Dev	Bengali	
2016	Okka Ammayi Thappa	Aslam Bhai	Telugu	
2016	Dishoom	Altaaf	Hindi	
2017	Sathya	Don David	Malayalam	
2017	E		Malayalam	
2017	Mubarakan	Akalpreet Sandhu	Hindi	
2017	I'm Not a Terrorist	Mustaffa	Malay / Hindi	Bilingual film
2018	Inttelligent	Vicky Bhai	Telugu	
2018	22 Days		Hindi	
2018	Dulhan Chahi Pakistan Se 2		Bhojpuri	
2018	Padayottam	Samad	Malayalam	
2019	Rocky		Marathi	
2019	Pagalpanti	Smuggler Kazaam	Gujarati	
2020	Operation Parindey	Monty Singh	Hindi	Released on ZEE5
2020	Torbaaz	Qazar	Hindi	Released on Netflix
2021	Ranam		Kannada	
2021	Raat Baaki Hai	Rajesh Ahlawat	Hindi	Released on ZEE5
2021	Arjun Gowda		Kannada	
2022	Bikkhov	Malik Pradhan	Bengali	Bangladeshi film
2022	The Legend	Member of VJ's pharmaceutical mafia	Tamil	
2023	Gaslight	SP Ashok Tanwar	Hindi	Released on Hotstar
2023	1920: Horrors of the Heart	Shantanu	Hindi	Lead role
2023	Kill Him	Anna Seth	Bengali	
2023	Mastaney	Nader Shah	Punjabi	
2023	R.A.M		Odia / Bengali	Bilingual film
2024	Shivrayancha Chhava	Kakar Khan	Marathi	
2024	The Miranda Brothers	Morocho	Hindi	
2024	Naam	Vikram	Hindi	
2024	Dard	Sarfaraz Khan	Hindi / Bengali	Bilingual film
2025	Good Bad Ugly	Convict	Tamil	
2025	Jack	Ata-ur-Rahman	Telugu	
2026	Ikkis	Lieutenant colonel Hanut Singh	Hindi	
2026	Gharga		Kannada	

=== Television ===
Year	Title	Role	Ref
2005	Games Bond	Host	
2010	Fear Factor: Khatron Ke Khiladi 3	Contestant	
2013	Devon Ke Dev...Mahadev	Arunasur	
2015–2016	Power Couple	Contestant	
2016	CID: Karo Ya Maro	Katori Damta	
2016	Bigg Boss 10	Contestant	
2017	Dil Boley Oberoi	Kali Thakur	
2021	The Empire	Wazir khan	
2023	Adhura	Officer Bedi	
2025	Reeta Sanyal	M. Raj Thakral	

=== Web series ===
Year	Title	Role	Ref.
2017–2018	The Test Case	Naib Subedar Kirpal Bhatti	
2020	Who's Your Daddy??	Prem Singh	
2020	Poison 2	Sikander Malik	
2021	LSD: Love, Scandal and Doctors	Dr. Rana	
2022	Hunter Tootega Nahi Todega	Hooda Kartoos	

== Awards and nominations ==
Year	Title	Award	Result	Notes
2001	Champion	Filmfare Best Villain Award	Nominated	
2001	Champion	Zee cine awards Best Debut Actor	Nominated	
2001	Champion	Sansui Viewer's Choice Awards Most promising Debut Actor	Nominated	
2002	Aashiq	Bollywood Movie Awards for Best Actor in a Negative Role	Nominated	
2004	Simhadri	Filmfare Award South for Best Villain- Telugu	Nominated	
2004	Awara paagal Deewana	Bollywood Movie Awards Best Actor in a Negative Role	Nominated	
2004	Footpath	Zee Cine Award for Best Performance in a Negative Role	Won	
