= Mrityudaata =

Mrityudata
- Poster
- Directed by: Mehul Kumar
- Written by: Mehul Kumar; Jalees Sherwani (dialogues)
- Produced by: Amitabh Bachchan
- Starring: Amitabh Bachchan; Dimple Kapadia; Karisma Kapoor; Paresh Rawal; Deepak Tijori; Arbaaz Ali Khan; Pran
- Cinematography: Rusi Billimoria
- Edited by: Yusuf Sheikh
- Music by: Anand–Milind
- Production company: Amitabh Bachchan Corporation Limited
- Release date: 25 April 1997
- Running time: 149 mins
- Country: India
- Language: Hindi
- Budget: ₹13 crore
- Box office: ₹17.37 crore

Mrityudaata (transl.: Angel of Death) is a 1997 Indian Hindi-language action film directed by Mehul Kumar with music by Anand Milind. Loosely adapted from the 1991 Bengali film Proshno, the film is considered to be a comeback role for Amitabh Bachchan, who temporarily left the industry in 1992. This film was produced by his own production company called Amitabh Bachchan Corporation Limited (ABCL). It marked Bachchan's comeback after five years and was a box office failure. One of the songs in the film picturized on Amitabh and Daler Mehndi was very popular when released.

== Plot ==
Dr. Ram Prasad Ghayal is a renowned doctor who has been successful in all operations in his career and has skillfully operated many delicate surgeries. He lives with his wife Janki and brother Bharat (Arbaaz Ali Khan). Bharat is in love with Renu, the daughter of Umeshchan Jain. At the same time, Raja Tunga, the brother of Rana Tunga has a longing for Renu. The miscreant Raja with his mob severely assaults Bharat when Bharat resists Raja's advances toward Renu.

A corrupt minister Mohanlal wants to execute a disastrous scheme called the "Pawanghat Power Project" at the expense of the lives and property of the tribes living at the project site. He coaxes and later threatens Bharat, the concerned engineer to sign his approval for the project, whereas Bharat refuses to endorse such a scheme. On the other hand, Rana devises an evil plot against Bharat to wipe the latter out eventually leading to his brother Raja winning Renu. Bharat is framed for murdering a woman and Inspector Danapani, a subordinate of Rana, arrests him and puts him behind bars. Woefully, Bharat dies in jail presumably by committing suicide. The agony of Bharat's death claims the life of Janki as well. With the death of his beloved wife and brother, Dr. Ram becomes desolate and alcoholic. Renu marries Raja, without any regret for the death of her former lover.

Now that Bharat is dead, Mohanlal conspires with Rana for the implementation of the power project. However, they end up becoming enemies of each other. Mohanlal plans to kill Raja. His henchmen attack Raja who is critically injured. Raja is admitted to the hospital where Dr. Ram is to conduct his operation. Renu fears that Dr. Ram may kill Raja to take vengeance for the death of his brother. She refuses to sign the operation papers, but Dr. Ram, who considers it his moral duty to save the life of a patient regardless of them being his friend or foe, conducts the operation. His expertise pays off as Raja is saved. He goes out to convey the news to Renu but returns to find Raja dead, beyond all his expectations. Renu files an F.I.R. against Dr. Ram, who is arrested and imprisoned.

In jail, Dr. Ram meets an inmate bearing the number 92, Prof Nizamuddin Azad, a scientist of "Bharat Atomic Energy". He has been jailed after a false allegation of revealing confidential nuclear formulae to foreign nations. He tells Dr. Ram that his brother Bharat did not commit suicide, but was tortured to death by Insp. Danapani, which he witnessed. Dr. Ram now realizes that his past misfortune was a result of the evil motives of some antagonists of the nation. He becomes the Angel of Death (Mrityudaata), who will put all those malefactors to death.

Dr. Ram breaks away from jail and nabs Insp. Danapani says that Mohanlal planned the murder of Bharat using his influence over the police. He also says that Raja was killed by Dr. Siddiqui (Avtar Gill) by cutting off the oxygen supply after Mohanlal bribed him to kill Raja. Dr. Ram kicks Danapani off the building to his death.

Meanwhile, Mohanlal has allied with another influential politician, Trilochan Tripathi, a.k.a. TT or Terror of Terrors, who keeps up an honest appearance among the masses, but works for his interests at the cost of the welfare of the public. Dr. Ram corners Dr. Siddiqui on the roof of Umeshchan Jain's house, who confesses to killing Raja and accepting a bribe from Mohanlal. Dr. Ram captures a video of Dr. Siddiqui's revelation before putting him to death. Soon, Dr. Ram kills Mohanlal.

One day, Trilochan Tripathi addresses a gathering when Dr. Ram publicly puts a video on view in which Tripathi signs an agreement with a foreign syndicate related to the "Pawanghat Power Project". Later, Tripathi would fool the public with false promises of power distribution. The enraged crowd chases Tripathi through the streets when Rana arrives for his rescue. Rana fires at Dr. Ram who burns Rana and Tripathi to death.

The film ends with Dr. Ram succumbing to his injuries.

== Cast ==
- Amitabh Bachchan as Dr. Ram Prasad Ghayal
- Dimple Kapadia as Mrs. Janki Ghayal
- Karishma Kapoor as Renuka Jain
- Arbaaz Ali Khan as Bharat Prasad Ghayal
- Paresh Rawal as Trilochan Tripathi (T.T.) / Terror of Terrors
- Mukesh Rishi as Rana Tonga
- Ashish Vidyarthi as Mohanlal
- Tiku Talsania as Umeshchan Jain
- Avtaar Gill as Dr. Rahim Siddiqui
- Mushtaq Khan as Police Inspector Danapani
- Deepak Tijori as Raja Tonga
- Aasif Sheikh as Uday; Mohanlal's son
- Farida Jalal as Mrs. Ghayal
- Pran as Professor Nizamuddin Azad / Prisoner #92
- Dinesh Hingoo as Maslani
- Daler Mehndi as himself (Special appearance in song "Na Na Na Na Re")

== Reception ==
The film opened well with cinemas at 95% capacity however, attendance dropped in the second week falling to 45% capacity with disappointing grosses.

== Soundtrack ==
Music composed by Anand–Milind, their only film with Amitabh Bachchan. Lyrics by Sameer.

| # | Title | Singer(s) |
|---|---|---|
| 1 | "Na Na Na Na Re" | Daler Mehndi, Sudesh Bhosle |
| 2 | "Illa Loo Illa Loo" | Vinod Rathod, Poornima |
| 3 | "Hamre Deshva Ki Burai" | Sudesh Bhosle |
| 4 | "Kabhi Khushiyon Ki Sargam" | Mohammad Aziz, Vinod Rathod, Alka Yagnik |
| 5 | "Tak Jhoom" | Abhijeet, Poornima |
| 6 | "Apne Baap Ka Kya Jata Hai" (Not in the film) | Sudesh Bhosle |

3 million audio cassettes were sold. The soundtrack was a successful release for ABCL.
