= Kohram =

1999 Indian Hindi action film

- Poster
- Directed by: Mehul Kumar
- Written by: Iqbal Durrani
- Produced by: Amitabh Bachchan Corporation
- Starring: Amitabh Bachchan; Nana Patekar; Jaya Prada; Tabu; Mukul Dev; Mukesh Rishi; Danny Denzongpa; Jackie Shroff; Kabir Bedi; Ayesha Jhulka
- Cinematography: Rasool Ellore
- Music by: Dilip Sen-Sameer Sen
- Release date: 13 August 1999
- Running time: 145 minutes
- Country: India
- Language: Hindi
- Box office: ₹13.28 crore

Kohram is a 1999 Indian Hindi-language action thriller film directed by Mehul Kumar. It features an ensemble cast of Amitabh Bachchan, Nana Patekar, Jaya Prada, Tabu, Mukul Dev, Mukesh Rishi, Danny Denzongpa, Jackie Shroff, Kabir Bedi and Ayesha Jhulka.

== Plot ==
The story starts with the death of an army officer, and it is believed to be the act of a terrorist group headed by Changezi. Colonel Balbir Singh Sodhi is asked to investigate this matter, and he discovers that minister Veerbhadra Singh is involved in this conspiracy. Colonel Sodhi stages his death in an attempt to kill Changezi and starts living as Dadabhai/Devraj Hathoda in Mumbai. Major Ajit Arya is sent in the guise of a Bengali journalist to discover the true identity of Dadabhai/Devraj Hathoda. Once Arya discovers the truth, he joins hands with Colonel Sodhi to bring the minister to justice and terminate the terrorist group.

== Cast ==
- Amitabh Bachchan as Colonel Balbir Singh Sodhi/Devraj Hathoda (Dadabhai)
- Nana Patekar as Major Ajit Arya/Basu Bankimchandra Chattopadhyay (BBC)
- Jaya Prada as Namrata B. Sodhi
- Tabu as Inspector Kiran Patkar
- Jackie Shroff as Major Rathod (cameo)
- Danny Denzongpa as Minister Virbhadra Singh
- Kabir Bedi as Brig. Bedi
- Mukesh Rishi as Ghafoor Changezi
- Mukul Dev as Monty
- Ayesha Jhulka as Sweety
- Avtar Gill as Police Commissioner
- Kishori Godbole as Virbhadra Singh's daughter

== Songs ==
Kohram

Soundtrack album by Dilip Sen-Sameer Sen
- Released: 1999
- Genre: Feature film soundtrack
- Label: Universal Music India

Music by the duo Dilip Sen-Sameer Sen.

1. "Jay Mata Dee He Ambe Baliharee" – Sanjeevani, Sukhwinder Singh
2. "Palakon Ko Kalam Banaa Ke, To Meraa Naam Nahin" – Alka Yagnik, Hariharan (Not in the film)
3. "Satanaam Vaaheguru, Baabaa Naanak Dukhiyaan De Naath Ve" – Kishanpal Singh
4. "Janeman Janeman Ladakee Too Number One" – Udit Narayan, Kavita Krishnamurthy
5. "Pagal Huwa Huwa Huwa" – Shankar Mahadevan, Jaspinder Narula
6. "Ik Mashuka Hai Yeh Jindagee Tum Ho Isape Shaida" – Sudesh Bhosle, Amit Kumar
7. "Ladakee Ladakee Too Woh Ladakee" – Alka Yagnik, Abhijeet (Not in the film)
8. "Hum Hai Banaras Ke Bhaya" – Sudesh Bhosle, Amit Kumar

== Release ==
Initially the film was slated to release on 6 August, but then Mehul Kumar advanced it to 13 August.

== Critical response ==
Sharmila Taliculam of Rediff.com criticised the storyline but praised the performances of Patekar and Bachchan. She further wrote, "Kohram would pass for quite an average film, hadn't it been for these two characters. If it's performance you are seeking, go right ahead and see it. If it's a great film, you want, forget it." Anupama Chopra of India Today wrote, "Kohram has Krantiveer-like crude energy and the first half moves at breakneck speed with Amitabh Bachchan and Nana Patekar, both army men, matching wits in a cat-and-mouse game. But proceedings slow to a crawl in the second half and the novelty of watching Bachchan and Patekar palls."
