= N. Maharajan =

Indian film director

- Born: Tamil Nadu, India
- Occupation: Film director
- Years active: 2000–2004

N. Maharajan is an Indian film director who directed Tamil and Hindi films. He made his debut with Vallarasu (2000) and then went on to direct Indian (2001) Anjaneya (2003) and Arasatchi (2004). He also wrote the story for Zor (1998), Champion (2000), and Kranti (2002).

== Career ==
Maharajan made his directorial debut with Vallarasu starring Vijayakanth. A scene shot was of Vijayakant and Devayani at a jewellery shop in T.Nagar in Chennai. The song was picturised near Pollachi and with the lead pair there were about 100 dancers. And choreographing the dance was dance master Haridas. A lavish set was erected at the A.V.M. Studios where a stunt scene was picturised between Vijayakant and Richard. Some stunt scenes were picturised between Vijayakant and Richard. Some stunt artistes who played as Richard's henchmen, also participated in the shot. Apart from Chennai, shooting locations were at New Delhi and Kulu Manali. The film receive positive reviews and became a box office success. The success of film led Maharajan to direct Narasimha which he later opted out.

In 2001, Maharajan remade Vallarasu in Hindi as Indian with Sunny Deol, which turned out to be a blockbuster hit. His next directorial was Anjaneya. The leading female role was eventually handed to Meera Jasmine even though Reemma Sen was also approached earlier for the film. The film featured Ajith Kumar in his first role as a police officer, before further appearances in Kireedam, Aegan, Mankatha and Yennai Arindhaal. The film was shot within 47 days, with Ajith reportedly working extra time to complete scenes. Producers downplayed any publicity for the film, releasing the audio with little fanfare and not releasing a teaser trailer. The film received negative reviews with the critic from The Hindu claiming that "the lack of consistency in the treatment affects the film no end", criticizing Maharajan's direction. There were rumours that Ajith didn't allow him to direct the second half properly. Too much intervention from Ajith led to a sub-standard product. And Maharajan could never recover back from the disaster.

Meanwhile, Maharajan announced his next project Arasatchi with Arjun playing the lead role. Miss Universe 2000 Lara Dutta made her acting debut in Tamil with this film. The film boasts of 14 villains played by Raghuvaran, Karan, Anandraj, Nasser, Nambiar, Ponnambalam, Delhi Ganesh, Mansur Alikhan, Devan, Rajan P Dev and Manivannan among others. Uma, Abitha, Vindhya and P Vasu play crucial roles in the film.

The filming was held at Le Royal Meridian Hotel, Chennai and the songs were picturised at locations in London, New Zealand and Canada.

The movie was completed in 2003 but got delayed due to financial problems and finally released in 2004, in between production delays Maharajan finished Anjaneya with Ajith.

Before release, poster featuring tagline "When Justice Fails" created controversy which caused a lawyer to file a case citing that the film would portray lawyers in bad light. After one week, case was finally won.

== Filmography ==
=== As film director ===
Year	Title	Language	Notes
2000	Vallarasu	Tamil	
2001	Indian	Hindi	
2003	Anjaneya	Tamil	
2004	Arasatchi	Tamil	

=== As writer ===
Year	Title	Credited as	Language	Notes
Year	Title	Writer	Language	Notes
1998	Zor	Story, screenplay	Hindi	
2000	Snegithiye	Dialogues	Tamil	
2000	Champion	Screenplay	Hindi	
2002	Kranti	Story	Hindi	
