= Vallarasu =

2000 film by N. Maharajan

- Poster
- Directed by: N. Maharajan
- Written by: N. Maharajan
- Produced by: L. K. Sudhish
- Starring: Vijayakanth; Devayani
- Cinematography: S. Saravanan
- Edited by: B. S. Vasu; Saleem
- Music by: Deva
- Production company: Captain Cine Creations
- Release date: 14 April 2000
- Running time: 173 minutes
- Country: India
- Language: Tamil

Vallarasu (transl. Superpower) (Note: Also the title character.) is a 2000 Indian Tamil-language action film directed by N. Maharajan in his debut. The film stars Vijayakanth and Devayani. The music is by Deva. It was released on 14 April 2000 to positive reviews and became a success. The film was remade in Hindi as Indian (2001) by the same director and Mukesh Rishi reprising his role as Wasim Khan. In addition, the film was dubbed into Telugu as Commissioner Narasimha Naidu.

== Plot ==
Vallarasu is the honest Deputy Commissioner of Police who has arrested Wasim Khan, a terrorist from Pakistan. His wife is Anjali, and they both have two children. Vallarasu kills his senior police officer and father-in-law because he knows that the latter is working with terrorists. Anjali leaves Vallarasu after she learns that he killed her father. Vallarasu takes the help of youths who are disillusioned by their inability to join the police force to fight violence. Vallarasu fights R. Kandasamy, a rich man who is behind the attempts to destabilise the country. With the help of Seshadri, a software engineer, Vallarasu succeeds in killing Kandasamy's son. In retaliation, Kandaswamy attacks Raheem and Seshadri, who both die. In the climax, Anjali unites with Vallarasu after knowing the truth. Vallarasu also kills both Kandasamy and Wasim Khan.

== Cast ==
- Vijayakanth as DCP Vallarasu
- Devayani as Anjali
- Raghuvaran as DGP Jagannathan, Anjali's father
- Livingston as CBI officer Chidambaram Pillai
- Karan as Seshadri
- Mansoor Ali Khan as Esakki Muthu Pandian
- Mukesh Rishi as Wasim Khan
- P. Vasu as R. Kandasamy
- R. Sundarrajan as Raheem's brother
- Vijay Krishnaraj as Vijayaraghavan
- Thalaivasal Vijay as Edward
- Ponnambalam as Manikkam
- Kazan Khan as Terrorist
- Peeli Sivam as Police commissioner
- Raviraj as Swamy Kannan
- Laxmi Rattan as Director general of police
- Thyagu as Seshadri's brother-in-law
- Ambika as Anjali's mother
- Dubbing Janaki as Seshadri's mother
- Charulatha as Seshadri's fiancée
- Master Naveen as Naveen, Vallarasu's son
- Baby Nisha as Nisha, Vallarasu's daughter
- Richard Rajasekhar as Rajasekhar, R. Kandasamy's son
- Sriman as Raheem, Vallarasu's henchman
- Darshan as Pandian, Vallarasu's henchman
- Kovai Easwar as Easwar
- Chitti as Chitti
- Crane Manohar as Jewellery shop owner
- Auditor Sridhar as Seshadri's father
- S. Rajasekar as Lawyer
- Ravi Raj as Judge
- Bobby as Nelson
- Sakthivel as Rowdy
- Nirmala Periyasamy as Newsreader
- Vellai Subbaiah as Man at the wedding hall
- Robo Chandru
- Sampath Ram as Police officer (uncredited role)
- Nitish Veera as Police officer (uncredited role)
- Vadivelu in a special appearance
- Bhanusri in a special appearance

== Production ==
One scene was of Vijayakanth and Devayani at a jewellery shop in T. Nagar in Chennai while the song following it was filmed near Pollachi and 100 dancers joined the lead pair. Choreography was by dance master Haridas. A lavish set was erected at A.V.M. Studios where a stunt scene was filmed between Vijayakanth and Richard. Some stunt scenes were filmed between Vijayakanth and Richard. Some stunt artists who portrayed Richard's henchmen also participated in the shot. Apart from Chennai, shooting locations were at New Delhi and Kulu Manali. A jail set was erected at Mohan Studios at Chennai. Bollywood villain Mukesh Rishi made his debut in Tamil cinema with this film. Director P. Vasu made his debut as an actor with this film in a negative role and Darshan, who would later become a Kannada cinema hero, made his Tamil debut in small role.

== Soundtrack ==
The music was composed by Deva.

Song title	Singer	Lyrics
"Adyar Beach Oram"	Deva	Kalidasan
"Aruppukottai Akka"	Hariharan, Sujatha	Vairamuthu
"Chekka Chekka Sevantha"	S. P. Balasubrahmanyam, S. Janaki	Vairamuthu
"Hello Mister Naidu"	Anuradha Sriram, Mano	Vairamuthu
"Nenje Nenje"	Shankar Mahadevan	Vairamuthu

== Reception ==
A critic from TMCafe.com gave the film a positive review, stating the "script is spiced with the right dose of emotion, sentiment and action, mixed with a heavy dose of patriotism" and that "Maharajan handles the megaphone like a seasoned veteran". The Hindu wrote, "The overpowering grit and idealism that Vallarasu exudes, rubs off on the audience too and is an energising factor, at least to a certain extent".
