= Jaani Dushman =

1979 Indian film by Rajkumar Kohli

- Theatrical release poster
- Directed by: Rajkumar Kohli
- Written by: Inder Raj Anand (dialogues)
- Screenplay by: Jaggiram Paul; Charandas Shokh
- Story by: Hakim Lata
- Produced by: Rajkumar Kohli
- Starring: Sunil Dutt; Sanjeev Kumar; Jeetendra; Shatrughan Sinha; Reena Roy; Rekha; Neetu Singh; Vinod Mehra; Bindiya Goswami
- Cinematography: Baldev Singh
- Edited by: Shyamal
- Music by: Laxmikant–Pyarelal
- Production company: Shankar Movies
- Release date: 1979
- Running time: 153 minutes
- Country: India
- Language: Hindi
- Budget: ₹13 million
- Box office: ₹90 million

Jaani Dushman (transl. Sworn Enemy) is a 1979 Indian Hindi-language horror film directed by Rajkumar Kohli. It features an ensemble cast of big stars Sunil Dutt, Sanjeev Kumar, Jeetendra, Shatrughan Sinha, Vinod Mehra, Reena Roy, Rekha, Neetu Singh and Bindiya Goswami. The film revolves around a plot concerning a monster who kidnaps and murders women wearing red bridal attire. Jaani Dushman was released worldwide and received mainly positive reviews from critics. Commercially, it was declared a "Blockbuster" at the box office. In 2002, Rajkumar Kohli directed another film with an identical name starring his son, Armaan.

== Plot ==
Thakur Jwala Prasad is murdered by his wife on their wedding night. His spirit returns to earth as a malevolent force who seeks revenge by killing newly wedded brides who wear traditional red bridal sarees. To do so, he has to possess a human body which turns into a monstrous being in the presence of brides. The possessed person appears to be normal otherwise so no one actually knows that the person is under the evil spirit's control. The only way to eliminate the spirit is by stabbing the possessed person in the chest, but destroying the spirit completely proves hard to do as he cunningly keeps transferring into new bodies before he can be vanquished.

At a remote estate, newly wedded brides are going missing when their palanquin reaches a particular temple and even their corpses cannot be found. The estate is ruled by the benevolent Thakur Saab. His only son, Shera, has turned out to be an arrogant roguish person which causes him distress. Shera is constantly butting heads with the villager, Lakhan, who is a good courageous man. Lakhan is in love with a village belle Reshma who is also in love with him. Shera lusts after Reshma which causes further friction between him and Lakhan. Shera's younger sister Shanti also loves Lakhan whereas another village girl named Champa loves Shera despite his errant ways.

Meanwhile, the disappearance of the brides causes everyone to be suspicious of everyone else. Some suspect a local vagrant who has mental health issues, others suspect the local priest as the brides go missing from near the temple, and finally many suspect the wayward Shera. After witnessing Thakur Saab have a breakdown at the sight of a red dress some even start to be suspicious of him.

Lakhan's younger sister Gauri goes missing from her own bridal procession. Her earring is found near the priest's shoes which causes the entire village to accuse him of the murders. He, however, proves his innocence. Lakhan also suspects Gauri's former boyfriend, Amar, for doing away with her. However, it turns out that they both actually committed suicide because they could not be together. So, it turns out that this entire incident actually had nothing to do with the case of the missing brides.

Shera wishes to marry Reshma and asks his father to approach Reshma's father, the blind Vaidji, with the proposal which Reshma rejects. Shera eventually finds out that Vaidji is not actually blind and is also a thief. Shera tries to blackmail him using this information to compel Reshma to marry him, but Vaidji comes clean in front of everyone instead so that Shera has no leverage against him or Reshma. He also asks Lakhan to marry Reshma and both readily agree. Meanwhile, Thakur Saab's daughter Shanti's marriage is fixed and she agrees to it as she realizes Lakhan loves Reshma and not her. Lakhan accompanies her palanquin to safeguard her. She reaches her destination safely, but this is actually due to her not wearing the traditional red bridal saree because of her father's phobia.

Eventually, everyone's suspicion turns towards Thakur Saab as his own daughter Shanti was spared whereas every other newly wedded bride went missing. Additionally, he was one of the only people, other than Lakhan, who knew of the plan to safeguard Shanti. Thakur Saab tries to commit suicide, but his wife reveals that their son, Shera also knew of the changed plans. Thakur Saab assures everyone that no matter who is guilty he would ensure their punishment, even if it is his own son Shera. Shera tries to escape after kidnapping Reshma, but he is stopped by Lakhan and when he is about to die after a fire nearly engulfs him, Champa jumps in to save him. Eventually, Shera understands his folly and accepts Champa's devotion to him.

Lakhan and Reshma get married. Reshma's palanquin reaches the temple and she is abducted by a monstrous looking man. Lakhan chases them into a cave. He spots Shera in there too, but realizes Shera also gave chase to the same monster. They both see the local vagrant is also there and they capture him. However, it turns out that the mentally unstable vagrant is actually a policeman in disguise who was working on the case of the missing brides. They fight with the monstrous looking man and Lakhan stabs him on the chest. It turns out that it was indeed Thakur Saab who was the monster all along, but since he is actually a good man his own spirit tries to hold off the evil spirit of Jwala Prasad from possessing someone else before the latter agrees to let go of his vengeful ways. Finally, Thakur Saab dies after ensuring the evil spirit is gone forever.

== Cast ==
- Sunil Dutt as Lakhan
- Sanjeev Kumar as Thakur
- Jeetendra as Amar
- Shatrughan Sinha as Shera
- Vinod Mehra as Inspector
- Rekha as Champa
- Reena Roy as Reshma
- Neetu Singh as Gauri: Lakhan's younger sister
- Yogeeta Bali as Thakur's Bride
- Bindiya Goswami as Shanti: Shera's younger sister
- Sarika as Bindiya
- Vikram Makandar as Shankar
- Premnath as Pujari
- Amrish Puri as Man Who Kidnapped Geeta (Bride)
- Raza Murad as Thakur Jwala Prasad
- Shakti Kapoor as Man On A Horse With A Bride
- Mac Mohan as Taxi Driver
- Madan Puri as Vaidji: Reshma's father
- Jagdeep as Nathuram
- Kanwarjeet Paintal as Gangelal
- Roopesh Kumar as Shera's maternal uncle "Mama"
- Aruna Irani as Aruna: Gangaram's daughter
- Jayshree T. as Nathaniya
- Sulochana Latkar as Lakhan and Gauri's mother
- Indrani Mukherjee as Thakurain
- Neeta Mehta as Bride
- Shobhini Singh as Bride
- Anwar Hussain as Dacoit Sardar
- Sheetal as Mrs. Jwala Prasad
- Aarati as Aarati (Bride)
- Murad as Shanti's father–in–law
- Surendra Rahi as Inspector

== Production ==
The majority of the scenes in this movie were filmed in locations such as Chenani and Patnitop hill stations of the Udhampur district, Jammu region in the Indian union territory of Jammu and Kashmir.

== Soundtrack ==
All lyrics by: Verma Malik

Song	Singer
"O Meri Jaan, Bol Meri Jaan, Teri Aankhon Ne Jaane Kya Jaadu Kiya"	Kishore Kumar, Anuradha Paudwal
"Are Sun Bhai Sadho"	Kishore Kumar, Asha Bhosle, Mahendra Kapoor
"Saare Rishte Naate Todke"	Lata Mangeshkar
"Aisi Waisi Na Samajh Sajna"	Asha Bhosle, Shatrughan Sinha
"Tere Haathon Mein Pehnaake Chudiyan"	Asha Bhosle, Mohammed Rafi
"Chalo Re, Doli Uthao Kahaar"	Mohammed Rafi

=== Trivia ===
Two of the movie songs were listed in Binacca Chart of 1979; "Oh Meri Jaan" by Kishore Kumar and Anuradha Paudwal and "Chalo Re, Doli Uthao Kahaar" by Mohammed Rafi.

=== In popular culture ===
In the 2022 Indian Hindi-language horror comedy film Bhediya, after Prakash is attacked by a wolf, and is admitted to a hospital, some friends are contemplating on what must have happened the previous night. Jomin [or Jo] rubbishes off the story of wolf attack by saying that Prakash must have seen Jaani Dushman. He even clarifies after a query, that he was talking not of Akshay Kumar's film, but of Sanjeev Kumar film. The allusion is clear, because of similar transformation of Sanjeev Kumar in this film.
