= Jimmy Moses =

Indian actor, singer, comedian, and artist

- Born: Anandam Janumala; 3 January 1971 (age 55); Mumbai, Maharashtra, India
- Other name: Jimmy Moses Janumala
- Occupations: Comedian, actor
- Notable work: Joru Ka Ghulam; Chennai Express; Soorma; The Great Indian Laughter Challenge a; Comedy Circus
- Spouse: Sangeeta Janumala
- Children: 2 including Naomi Janumala
- Relatives: Johnny Lever (brother); Jamie Lever (niece)

Jimmy Moses Janumala is an Indian actor, playback singer, stand-up comedian and mimicry artiste from Mumbai. He is the younger brother of comedian Johnny Lever. Jimmy has been doing comedy for more than two decades now, and has done about 4,000 shows in more than 30 countries.

== Early life and education ==
Jimmy Moses was born to Prakash Rao Janumala and Karunamma Janumala in Mumbai. The family consisted of 3 sisters and 2 brothers including himself. He spent his early years in Dharavi and Antop Hill, in suburban Mumbai. After his tenth grade exams, he started managing his brother Johnny's work. After reading a lot of humour artists' books to learn the nuances of comedy as mentored by his elder brother, Jimmy started by doing mimicry in his locality during festivals and eventually moved on to shows.

== Personal life ==
His daughter Naomi Janumala is an Elite Model and has worked with Rihanna.

== Career ==
He has done world tours with Shah Rukh Khan and Aamir Khan. He has also done a world tour with Sonu Nigam. He does various corporate shows and public shows all over the world.

He secured films (Joru Ka Ghulam, Ghaath, Aap Mujhe Achche Lagne Lage, Tera Jadoo Chal Gaya, Krazzy 4), also has done the play Haste Haste Lag Gaye Raste and television shows (Tu Tu Main Main, Phir Bhi Dil Hai Hindustani, The Great Indian Laughter Challenge). Jimmy was one of the celebrity contestants of the third installment of the television reality show Comedy Circus called Teen Ka Tadka in 2009. Jimmy has worked in the Colors show Nautanki The Comedy Theater and also Comedy Nights With Kapil. He also performed in the show Comedy Dangal featured on &TV

He recently was seen as a truck driver in Chennai Express. He was also featured in the movie Kyaa Kool Hain Hum 3. He did a cameo in the television comedy-drama series Mrs. Pammi Pyarelal on Colors TV channel. He acted in a supporting role as an assistant coach in the movie Soorma.
