= Johnny Lever =

Indian actor and comedian (born 1957)

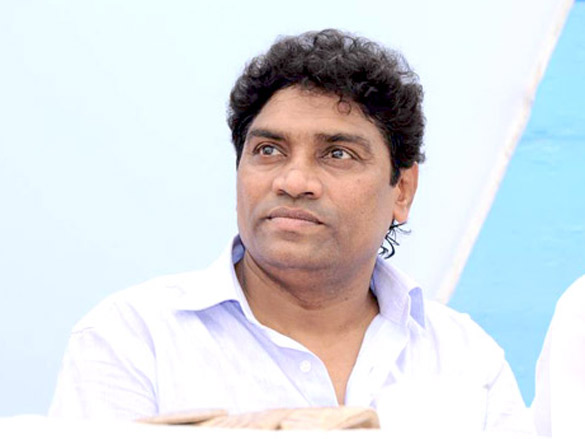
- Lever in 2012
- Born: John Prakash Rao Janumala; 14 August 1957 (age 69); Kanigiri, Andhra Pradesh, India
- Occupations: Actor; comedian
- Years active: 1981–present
- Spouse: Sujatha Lever (m. 1984)
- Children: 2, including Jamie
- Relatives: Jimmy Moses (brother)

John Prakash Rao Janumala, better known by his stage name Johnny Lever (born on 14 August 1957) is an Indian actor and comedian who is known for his works in Hindi cinema. He is one of the most recognised comedic actors in India and is widely regarded as one of the greatest comedians in Indian Cinema. He has received numerous accolades, including thirteen Filmfare Awards nominations in Filmfare Award for Best Performance in a Comedic Role, and has won the award twice, for his work in Deewana Mastana (1997) and Dulhe Raja (1998). He began his career in 1984, and has acted in more than three hundred Hindi films.

== Early life ==
Lever was born on 14 August 1957 in a Telugu Christian family in Prakasam, Andhra Pradesh. His father worked as an operator in Hindustan Unilever plant where he also worked as a labourer for six years. Lever was brought up in King's Circle area of Matunga in Mumbai. He is the eldest in the family consisting of three sisters and two brothers (including his younger brother Jimmy Moses).

Lever studied in Andhra education society English high school until the seventh grade as he could not study further because of financial problems in his family. As a result, he decided to leave school and started working odd jobs, such as selling pens on the streets of Mumbai by mimicking some famous Hindi film stars of that time and dancing to the songs of Hindi film stars. He also spent his early years in Yakutpura, an old city of Hyderabad, where he learnt the unique style of comedy acting.

During a Hindustan Unilever company function, he mimicked a few senior officers, and from that day on, the workers said he is Johnny Lever. When he later joined the film industry, he decided to use Johnny Lever as his screen name.

== Career ==
=== Stand-up comedy career ===
He started to perform stand-up comedy in musical shows (orchestras), Tabassum Hit Parade and after earning fame, joined the group of Kalyanji-Anandji, a music direction duo. Lever is one of the first stand-up comedians in India and widely regarded as pioneer of stand-up comedy profession in India. Even before joining Hindustan Unilever (HUL), he was giving stage performances. Because of his growing absenteeism and since he was earning well from stage shows, he quit HUL in the year 1981. He did a lot of shows and world tours with them, one of his first big tours being with Amitabh Bachchan in 1982. At one of his shows, veteran actor Sunil Dutt noticed his talent and potential and offered him his first movie Dard Ka Rishta.

He recorded a comedy cassette called Hasi Ke Hangame which gave him recognition at homes via the audio mode. During this period, he also did a few commercials for Kachua chhap incense, directed by Shekhar Kapur. In 1986, he performed in a charity show Hope 86 in front of members of the Hindi film industry as a filler. His talent was recognised, which resulted in producer Gul Anand offering him the film Jalwa, alongside Naseeruddin Shah.

=== Film career ===
==== 1980s ====
Lever got his first break in Tum Par Hum Qurban, in which the famous TV and stage compère and yesteryears actress Baby Tabassum launched her son Hoshang Govil as the leading man, and then with the film Dard Ka Rishta, thanks to Tabassum and the late Sunil Dutt. Since then, he has acted in more than 350 films including films such as Tezaab, Kasam, Khataranak and Kishen Kanhaiya . After Dard Ka Rishta, he was seen in Jalwa, Hero Hiralal with Naseeruddin Shah.

==== 1990s ====
His first major success came with Baazigar, and after that he was seen in movies as a supporting actor/comedian. Despite being busy with his movie roles, he continued to do live shows. One of his most memorable live performances was an impersonation of Michael Jackson at the 1999 Filmfare Awards. His most acclaimed performance was the character of "Babulal" in the film, Baazigar, directed by Abbas-Mustan. He is also remembered for some of his other famous characters, like "Chotta Chattri", "Aslam Bhai", etc.

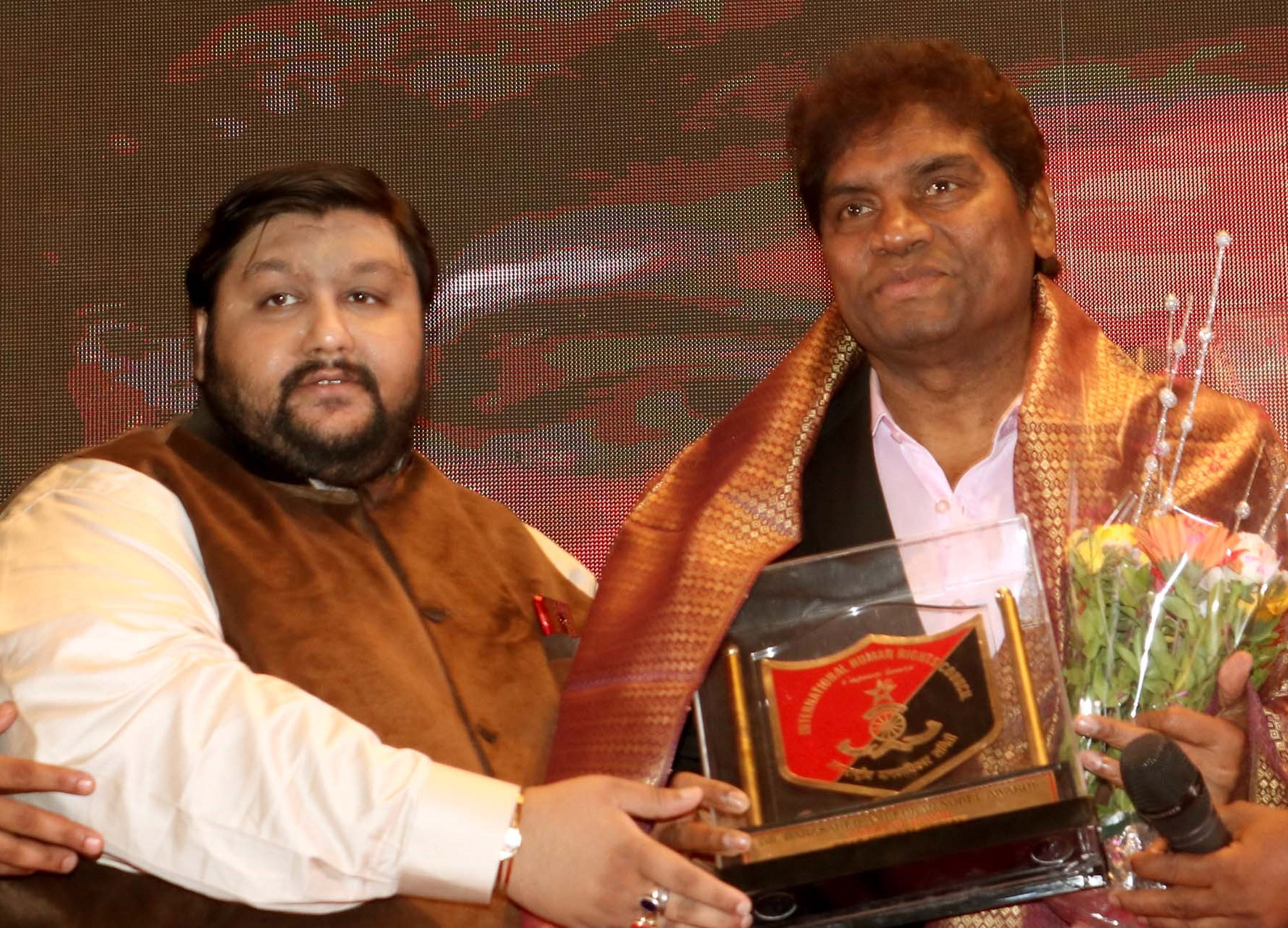
Johny Lever being awarded during the 4th edition of Dr. Babasaheb Ambedkar Nobel Awards 2019.

==== 2010s ====
He also acted in a Tulu movie, Rang. His first Tamil feature film was Anbirkku Alavillai released in 2011. He also starred in a Kannada film, Gara.

=== Television career ===
Lever's first appeared in an episode of sitcom Zabaan Sambhalke as Johnny Utolandand in 1993. Lever also appeared on Zee TV in his own show, Johny Aala Re. In 2007, he appeared as a judge on the stand-up reality show Comedy Circus. In 2017 Lever joined the cast of Partners as Commissioner Googol Chatterjee.

He is the president of MAAM (Mimicry Artist Association Mumbai), and has done thousands of live shows all over the world.

== Personal life ==
He married Sujatha Lever in 1984 and has two children Jamie and Jessy. His younger brother, Jimmy Moses, is also a comedian and mimicry artist. Actress Jamie Lever is his daughter.

Lever is a Christian and has worked as a preacher; he said his decision was:

It was God's will. I had always been a religious person, but one incident changed my life. My son was diagnosed with throat tumour. I was helpless and turned to God for help. I stopped working in films and spent all my time praying for him. Ten days later, when he was taken for a test, the doctors were surprised because the cancer had vanished. It was the beginning of a new life for me.

== Filmography ==
=== Films ===
Key
†	Denotes films that have not yet been released

List of Johnny Lever film credits
Year	Title	Role	Notes
1981	Yeh Ristha Na Tootay		
1982	Dard Ka Rishta	Joseph	
1984	Ek Nai Paheli		
1985	Tum Par Hum Qurban		
1986	Love 86	Uttam	
1986	Main Balwaan		
1987	Jalwa	Muthu (The Masseur)	
1987	Parivaar		
1988	Ghar Main Ram Gali Main Shyam	Srivastav's Servant	
1988	Kasam		
1988	Hatya	Blacksmith	
1988	Aakhri Adalat	Havaldar	
1988	Hero Hiralal	Police constable	
1988	Tezaab	Munna's friend	
1989	Suryaa		
1989	Ilaaka		
1989	Mujrim	Shankar's PA	
1989	Jaadugar	Nilkant	
1989	Kala Bazar	Kutti Chai Walla	
1989	ChaalBaaz	Johny Baba Tantrik	Special appearance
1989	Main Azaad Hoon	Protester	Uncredited
1990	Kafan		
1990	Majboor		
1990	Bandh Darwaza		Special appearance
1990	Kishen Kanhaiya	Lobo	
1990	Raeeszada		
1991	Ajooba Kudrat Ka		
1991	Vishnu-Devaa	Havaldar No. 1	
1991	Sapnon Ka Mandir		
1991	Narsimha	Tempo Dada	
1992	Jungle Ka Beta		
1992	Geet Milan Ke Gaate Rehenge		
1992	Khiladi	Anna Pillai	
1992	Humla	Shiva's Friend	
1992	Chamatkar	Cricket Commentator	
1992	Tilak	Lakhan	
1993	Teri Payal Meree Geet		
1993	Yugandhar	Bala	
1993	Aasoo Bane Angaarey		
1993	Anari	Bablu	
1993	Roop Ki Rani Choron Ka Raja	Sub Inspector Rang Birangi	
1993	Anmol	Himself	Special appearance
1993	Santaan	Kalia	
1993	Baazigar	Babulal	Nominated- Filmfare Best Comedian Award
1993	Aulad Ke Dushman	Johny	
1993	Bhagyawan		
1993	Game	Jaggu	
1993	Mahakaal		
1994	Masti		
1994	Zamane Se Kya Darna		
1994	Kanoon	Lakhiya	
1994	Anjaam	Champa Chameli	
1994	Saajan Ka Ghar		
1994	Ekka Raja Rani	Guruji (Dance master)	
1994	Juaari	Salim Tension	
1994	Prem Yog		
1994	Main Khiladi Tu Anari	Dhansukh	
1994	Criminal	Changu / Himself	Special appearance in Telugu version; shot in Telugu and Hindi languages
1994	Yaar Gaddar	Police Inspector	
1994	Mr. Azaad		
1995	Inteqam Ke Sholey		
1995	Dilbar		
1995	Karan Arjun	Linghaiyya	Nominated- Filmfare Best Comedian Award
1995	Rock Dancer	Police Inspector Johnny	
1995	Ram Shastra	Reporter Raja	
1995	Haqeeqat	Tony	
1996	Jaan	Damru	
1996	Himmatwar		
1996	Hahakar	Chamcha	
1996	Daraar	Hari	
1996	Bhishma	Natwar	
1996	Sapoot	Deva	
1996	Raja Hindustani	Balvant Singh	Won- Screen Award for Best Comedian Nominated- Filmfare Best Comedian Award
1996	Jeet	Piajee	
1996	Dushman Duniya Ka	Headmaster	
1997	Jodidar	Agarbatti / Pens / Bangles / Sarees salesman	
1997	Daayen		
1997	Ghunghat	Pandit Vishwanat	
1997	Judaai	Hiralal	Nominated- Filmfare Best Comedian Award
1997	Auzaar	Peter	
1997	Kaalia	Khan Dada	
1997	Himalay Putra	Joe	
1997	Agni Morcha		
1997	Koyla	Shanker's Friend	
1997	Do Ankhen Barah Hath	Rickshaw Walla	
1997	Yes Boss	Madhav Advani, aka MAD	
1997	Judge Mujrim	Havaldar Amar Lokhande, Akbar Charsi, Anthony Bhai & Janakimma	
1997	Krishna Arjun	Rocky	
1997	Mr. and Mrs. Khiladi	Bandaged patient on street	
1997	Deewana Mastana	Ghafoor	Won- Filmfare Best Comedian Award
1997	Ishq	Ranjit's brother-in-law	
1998	Barsaat Ki Raat		
1998	Yeh Aashiqui Meri		
1998	Miss 420	Tony Fernandes	
1998	Do Numbri	Damru	
1998	Ustadon Ke Ustad		
1998	Aakrosh: Cyclone of Anger	Gopi	
1998	Keemat: They Are Back	Sub-Inspector Ultappan/Kirappan	
1998	Aunty No. 1		
1998	Jiyaala		
1998	Mard	Bindas	
1998	Jab Pyaar Kisise Hota Hai	Mahesh	
1998	Achanak	Joni/Moni/Toni Kapoor	
1998	Dulhe Raja	Bankhey (Hotel Manager)	Won- Filmfare Best Comedian Award
1998	Kareeb	Bighe Laal	
1998	Iski Topi Uske Sarr	Gabbar Singh/Mogamba/John Lobo	
1998	Barood	Presenter	
1998	Tirchhi Topiwale	Kadak K. Pillay	
1998	Kuch Kuch Hota Hai	Col. Almeida, Camp Manager	Nominated- Filmfare Best Comedian Award
1998	Soldier	Mohan/Sohan	
1998	Wajood	Inspector Rahim Khan	
1999	Heeralal Pannalal	Heeralal (Double role)	
1999	Ganga Ki Kasam		
1999	Dulhan Banoo Main Teri	Jack	
1999	Munnibai	Kammal Khan	
1999	Benaam	Munna Mobile	
1999	Hum Aapke Dil Mein Rehte Hain	Sunny Goyal	
1999	Daag: The Fire	Sundar	
1999	Laawaris	Gaflet	
1999	International Khiladi	Focus	
1999	Anari No. 1	Daler Mehndi	Nominated – Filmfare Best Comedian Award
1999	Silsila Hai Pyar Ka	Johny	
1999	Sirf Tum	Niranjan	
1999	Baadshah	Ramlal	
1999	Hello Brother	Havaldar Hatella	
1999	Hum Tum Pe Marte Hain	Sattu	
1999	Khoobsurat	Natwar	Guest appearance
1999	Jaanwar	Bajrangi	
2000	Krodh	Prem	
2000	Jwalamukhi		
2000	Hadh Kar Di Aapne	Father/Son Lawyer Team	
2000	Tera Jadoo Chal Gayaa	Maggi	
2000	Meri Jung Ka Elaan		
2000	Beti No. 1	Mulayamchand 'Mullu'	
2000	Kaali Topi Laal Rumaal	Nanhey	
2000	Kunwara	Gopal	Nominated- Filmfare Best Comedian Award
2000	Mela	Inspector Pakkad Singh	
2000	Kaho Naa Pyaar Hai	Inspector Parab	Special appearance
2000	Dulhan Hum Le Jayenge	Tour Manager Chirkund	
2000	Phir Bhi Dil Hai Hindustani	Pappu Junior	Nominated- Filmfare Best Comedian Award
2000	Badal	Gulel Singh Rangoli	
2000	Dil Hi Dil Mein	College Professor Jack	Hindi dubbed version
2000	Hum To Mohabbat Karega	Kutti	
2000	Joru Ka Ghulam	Kanhaiya	
2000	Deewane	Okay	
2000	Hamara Dil Aapke Paas Hai	Chatterjee	
2000	Fiza	Laughing Club Comic	
2000	Shikari	Jafrani Sindhi Businessman	
2000	Khatarnak	Inspector Pratap Tungare	Marathi film debut
2000	Aaghaaz	Rajni Deva	
2000	Raju Chacha	Jaddu	
2001	Farz	Informer named 'Taxi'	
2001	Aashiq		
2001	Chori Chori Chupke Chupke	Pappu Bhai	
2001	Censor	Vikramjeet's First Assistant	
2001	Love Ke Liye Kuch Bhi Karega	Aslam Bhai	Won- Zee Cine Award for Best Actor in a Comic Role
2001	Lajja		
2001	Nayak	TV Cameraman Topi	
2001	Ajnabee	Banu Pradhan (B.P.)	Nominated- Filmfare Best Comedian Award
2001	Dial 100		
2001	Asoka	Magadha Soldier	
2001	Arjun Devaa		
2001	Kabhi Khushi Kabhie Gham	Haldiram	extended special appearance
2001	Aamdani Atthani Kharcha Rupaiyaa	Appu Khote	
2002	Ankhiyon Se Goli Maare	Subramaniam	
2002	Yeh Dil Aashiqanaa		
2002	Yeh Mohabbat Hai	Jaggi	
2002	Tumko Na Bhool Paayenge	Pakhandee Baba	
2002	Angaar – The Fire		
2002	Badmash No. 1		
2002	Pyaar Diwana Hota Hai	Paresh Chaval (Painter)	
2002	Awara Paagal Deewana	Chhota Chhatri	
2002	Humraaz	Mr. Darshan	Nominated- Filmfare Best Comedian Award (extended guest appearance)
2002	Jaani Dushman: Ek Anokhi Kahani	Parwana	
2002	Yeh Kaisi Mohabbat	Paajal	
2002	Annarth	Ben Bose, Music Director	
2002	Kehta Hai Dil Baar Baar	Natwar	
2002	Karz – The Burden of Truth	Juggi	
2002	Chalo Ishq Ladaaye		
2003	Kucch To Hai	Popatlal	
2003	Khushi	Milestone	
2003	Kaash Aap Hamare Hote	Native Indian Black Face	
2003	Indian Babu	Mr. Patel/Principal "Patel Bond 008"	Special appearance
2003	Kaise Kahoon Ke Pyaar Hai	Sandwich	
2003	Andaaz	G. I. Joe	
2003	Chalte Chalte	Nandu (The Roadside Drunkard)	
2003	Main Prem Ki Diwani Hoon	Johnny	
2003	Aisaa Kyon		
2003	Koi... Mil Gaya	Constable Sukhwani	Nominated- Filmfare Best Comedian Award
2003	Market		
2003	Janasheen	Johnny Chen	
2004	God Only Knows!	Road Babe	
2004	Hatya: The Murder	Paid Mourner	
2004	Navra Maza Navsacha	Bahadur	Marathi Film (Guest Appearance)
2004	Aabra Ka Daabra	Maneklal	
2005	Meri Biwi Ka Jawab Nahin	Chitra Gupta	
2005	Padmashree Laloo Prasad Yadav	Yadav	
2005	Khullam Khulla Pyaar Karen	Pashabhai	
2005	Deewane Huye Paagal	Murgan	
2006	Aisa Kyon Hota Hai?		
2006	Banana Brothers		
2006	Saawan... The Love Season	Akhil Rao	
2006	36 China Town	KK	
2006	Phir Hera Pheri	Munna	
2006	Chashmebahadur		
2006	Sandwich		
2007	Fool n Final	Puttu Pilot	
2008	Thela No. 501		
2008	Race	Max (The marriage bureau chief)	Special appearance
2008	Konchem Koththaga	Thief	Telugu film; special appearance
2008	Khallbali: Fun Unlimited		
2008	Nidar – The Fearless		
2008	Aap Jaisa Koi Nahin		
2008	Mr Tikdambaaz		
2008	Paying Guests	Ballu Ji	
2009	Dhoondte Reh Jaaoge	Parvej Asharraf 'Champa'/Daku Rabbar Singh	
2009	All the Best: Fun Begins	Tobu	
2009	Aao Wish Karein	Hitchchock	
2009	De Dana Dan	Kaala Krishna Murari	
2010	Dulha Mil Gaya	Krish	
2010	Bhavnaon Ko Samjho	Vivaah Marriage Bureau	
2010	Prem Kaa Game	Ramnik Chedda	
2010	Khatta Meetha	Award Anshuman	
2010	Golmaal 3	Pappi Bhai	
2011	Love Mein Ghum	Sukhia	Pakistani film
2011	Yamla Pagla Deewana	Jeweller	
2011	Anbirkku Alavillai	Johnny Bhai	Tamil film
2011	Masti Express	Veerubhai	
2011	Bin Bulaye Baraati	Sajjan Singh	
2011	Be Careful	Lobo	
2011	Tell Me O Khuda	Pandurang P.	
2012	Players	MC	
2012	Chaar Din Ki Chandni	Paan Singh	
2012	Housefull 2	Vishwas Patil	
2012	Deewana Main Deewana	Husband	
2012	Khiladi 786	Inspector Bhalerao Kambli	
2012	Savior		
2013	Yamla Pagla Deewana 2	Bunty	
2013	Boss	Zorawar Singh	
2013	Singh Saab the Great	Gulwinder	
2013	Enemmy	CID Officer Eric Collaco	
2014	Entertainment	Habibulla	
2014	My Father Godfather	Director (Special Appearance)	
2014	Rang	Guest Role	Tulu film
2015	Dilwale	Mani Bhai	
2016	Santa Banta Pvt Ltd	Chooza	
2017	Machine	Darpan Gopal	
2017	Pappa Tamne Nahi Samjaay	College Principal	Gujarati film
2017	Judwaa 2	Pappu Passport	
2017	Golmaal Again	Pappi Bhai	
2019	Total Dhamaal	Raju (Pilot)	
2019	Gara		Kannada film
2019	Housefull 4	Winston Churchgate	
2020	Coolie No.1	Inspector Jagjit Godbole	
2021	Hungama 2	Tutor Gagan Chandra D'Costa	
2022	Cirkus	Polson Dada	
2022	Jaysuk Zdpayo	Mansukh	Gujarati film
2022	Naam Tha Kanhaiyalal	Himself	Documentary
2023	Bad Boy	Poltu	
2023	Aflatoon	Nawab Waajid Ali	
2024	Lantrani	Policeman	
2024	I Want to Talk	Johny	
2025	Badass Ravi Kumar	Raja	
2025	Be Happy	Gopi	
2025	Housefull 5	Batuk Patel	
2026	Hai Jawani Toh Ishq Hona Hai	Godbole	
2026	Welcome to the Jungle	Dubey	
2026	Firki		Gujarati film
TBA	Golmaal 5	Pappi Bhai	

=== As playback singer ===
List of Johnny Lever film singing credits
Year	Title	Song	Notes
1989	Chaalbaaz	"Bhoot Raja"	
1995	Ravan Raaj	"Tu Cheez Badi Hai Sakht Sakht"	
1998	Achanak		

=== As dubbing artist ===
List of Johnny Lever film voiceover credits
Year	Title	Actor	Role	Original language	Dub Language
1996	Hindustani	Senthil	Panneerselvam	Tamil	Hindi

=== Television shows ===
List of Johnny Lever television shows and roles
Year	Title	Role	Notes	Ref.
1993	Zabaan Sambhalke	Johnny Utolandand	Episode 29	
2006	Johny Aala Re	Host/presenter		
2007	Comedy Circus	Himself (Judge)		
2017–2018	Partners Trouble Ho Gayi Double	Gogol Chatterjee/Khabri Murgai	Double role	
2023	Pop Kaun?	Brij Kishor Trivedi		

== Awards and nominations ==
Year	Category	Work	Result
Filmfare Awards
1994	Best Performance in a Comic Role	Baazigar	Nominated
1996	Best Performance in a Comic Role	Karan Arjun	Nominated
1997	Best Performance in a Comic Role	Raja Hindustani	Nominated
1998	Best Performance in a Comic Role	Deewana Mastana	Won
1998	Best Performance in a Comic Role	Judaai	Nominated
1999	Best Performance in a Comic Role	Dulhe Raja	Won
1999	Best Performance in a Comic Role	Kuch Kuch Hota Hai	Nominated
2000	Best Performance in a Comic Role	Anari No.1	Nominated
2001	Best Performance in a Comic Role	Kunwara	Nominated
2001	Best Performance in a Comic Role	Phir Bhi Dil Hai Hindustani	Nominated
2002	Best Performance in a Comic Role	Ajnabee	Nominated
2003	Best Performance in a Comic Role	Humraaz	Nominated
2004	Best Performance in a Comic Role	Koi... Mil Gaya	Nominated
IIFA Awards
2001	Best Performance in a Comic Role	Phir Bhi Dil Hai Hindustani	Nominated
2002	Best Performance in a Comic Role	Ajnabee	Nominated
2004	Best Performance in a Comic Role	Koi... Mil Gaya	Nominated
2010	Best Performance in a Comic Role	De Dana Dan	Nominated
Indian Television Academy Awards
2018	Best Actor - Comedy	Partners Trouble Ho Gayi Double	Nominated
Producers Guild Film Awards
2018	Best Actor in a Comic Role	Housefull 2	Nominated
Screen Awards
1997	Best Comedian	Raja Hindustani	Won
2002	Best Comedian	Ajnabee	Nominated
2003	Best Comedian	Awara Paagal Deewana	Nominated
2011	Best Comedian	Golmaal 3	Nominated
Zee Cine Awards
2002	Best Actor in a Comic Role	Love Ke Liye Kuchh Bhi Karega	Won
2004	Best Actor in a Comic Role	Koi... Mil Gaya	Nominated

== See also ==
- List of Indian comedians
- List of stand-up comedians
- Johny Aala Re
