= Aulad Ke Dushman =

Aulad Ke Dushman औलाद के दुश्मन
- Directed by: Rajkumar Kohli
- Written by: Lalit Mahajan
- Produced by: Rajkumar Kohli
- Starring: Armaan Kohli; Ayesha Jhulka; Kanchan
- Cinematography: Thomas A. Xavier
- Edited by: Sandesh Kohli
- Music by: Shyam-Surender
- Production company: Shankar Movies
- Release date: 3 December 1993 (India)
- Country: India
- Language: Hindi

Aulad Ke Dushman is a 1993 Indian Bollywood action drama film produced and directed by Rajkumar Kohli. It stars Armaan Kohli and Ayesha Jhulka in pivotal roles.

== Plot ==
Rajan K. Choudhry is a wealthy industrialist. He lives in a palatial house with his older brother, and only son, Vikram. Vikram is a womanizer, alcoholic, and late-party goer, who has been handed everything on a silver plater by his dad. His uncle does not appreciate this, and wants Rajan to assert his responsibility as a parent and discipline Vikram, in vain though. Rajan would like Vikram to marry his friend's, Jai Kumar's daughter, Shalu, but Vikram only treats Shalu as a friend. Just to spite his dad, without knowing that his decisions are going to lead both father and son to a destitute fate, that will change their lives forever.

== Cast ==
- Shatrughan Sinha as Rajan Chaudhary
- Raj Babbar as Jai Kumar
- Armaan Kohli as Vikram Chaudhary "Vicky"
- Ayesha Jhulka as Shalu
- Shakti Kapoor as Dindayal Bhargav
- Kader Khan as Ahuja, College Vice-Principal.
- Saeed Jaffrey as Rajan's Elder Brother.
- Johnny Lever as Johnny
- Kanchan as Chanda Bhargav, Dindayal's daughter
- Raza Murad
- Vikas Anand as Ramlal
- Deepak Saraf as Sailesh

== Soundtrack ==
1. "Aao Tumhe Bataayen" - Abhijeet Bhattacharya, Jolly Mukherjee, Jyoti
2. "Dil Tujhko De Diya" - Kumar Sanu, Sadhana Sargam
3. "Main Aa Gaya Hoon" - Amit Kumar
4. "Main Tera Deewana Hoon" - Alka Yagnik, Kumar Sanu, Sadhana Sargam
5. "Maine Tumse Pyar Kiya" - Kumar Sanu, Sadhana Sargam
6. "Tum Bhi Ho Bekhabar" - Kumar Sanu, Sadhana Sargam
