= Be Careful What You Wish For =

Be Careful What You Wish For is an English phrase. It may also refer to:

== Books ==
- Be Careful What You Wish For... (novella), the twelfth book in R.L. Stine's Goosebumps series
- Be Careful What You Wish For (Potter novel), by Alexandra Potter
- Be Careful What You Wish For (Archer novel), by Jeffrey Archer

== Music ==
=== Albums ===
- Be Careful What You Wish For..., by Gabby La La
- Be Careful What You Wish For (AKA & Anatii album), 2017
- Be Careful What You Wish For (Ramleh album), 1995

=== Songs ===
- "Be Careful What You Wish For", by Luke Combs from the album This One's for You
- "Be Careful What You Wish For", by Noel Gallagher's High Flying Birds from the album Who Built the Moon?, 2017

== Film and television ==
- "Be Careful What You Wish For" (Cow and Chicken), a 1998 television episode
- Be Careful What You Wish For, a working title of 2007 film How I Married My High School Crush
- "Be Careful What You Wish For" (Dawson's Creek), television episode

== See also ==
- Be Careful (disambiguation)
- Careful What You Wish For (disambiguation), 2015
- Be Careful What You Don't Wish For, album by Twelve
- "Be Careful What You Fish For", episode of Family Guy
- "Be Careful What You Witch For", episode of Charmed
