= Qahar =

- Theatrical release poster
- Directed by: Rajkumar Kohli
- Written by: Lalit Mahajan
- Produced by: Rajkumar Kohli
- Starring: Sunny Deol; Suniel Shetty; Armaan Kohli; Sonali Bendre; Deepti Bhatnagar; Rambha
- Cinematography: Thomas A. Xavier
- Edited by: Kuku; Cukoo
- Music by: Anand–Milind
- Production company: Shankar Movies
- Release date: 1997
- Running time: 161 mins
- Country: India
- Language: Hindi

Qahar (transl. Calamity) is a 1997 Indian Hindi-language action film directed and produced by Rajkumar Kohli. A loosely remake of the 1989 Bengali film Ladai and Tamil Movie Thalapathi (1991)., it stars Sunny Deol, Suniel Shetty, Armaan Kohli, Sonali Bendre, Rambha and Deepti Bhatnagar in pivotal roles.

== Plot ==
Amar Kapoor is an honest and diligent police inspector, and the only son of Commissioner Kapoor, assigned to investigate and bring charges against Krishna, and his friend Raja.

During the course of his investigation, he does locate both Raja and Krishna, but discovers that Krishna is his brother, and Raja is involved in fighting the very forces of corruption, namely Velji Patel, his brother Nageshwar Patel, and a corrupt Police Inspector Maroo, who are all responsible for the rape and brutal murder of Neelam, the love of Raja, that he and his dad have a duty to eliminate.

Will they join forces to combat the evil-doers or will fate have something else in store for them?

== Cast ==
- Sunny Deol as Raja
- Armaan Kohli as Inspector Krishna
- Sunil Shetty as ACP Amar Kapoor
- Sonali Bendre as Neelam
- Deepti Bhatnagar as Sapna Kapoor
- Rambha as Radha
- Raj Babbar as Police Commissioner Kapoor
- Gulshan Grover as Inspector Maroo
- Ramesh Goyal as Inspector
- Paresh Rawal as Velji Patel
- Kiran Kumar as Nageshwar Patel
- Raza Murad as Minister Dharam Chand
- Siddhant Salaria as Siddhant Patel, Velji Patel son.
- Aruna Irani as Kanta
- Rohini Hattangadi as Shanti, Krishna's mother.
- Chandrashekhar Vaidya as Judge Surinder

== Soundtrack ==
The music of the film was composed by Anand–Milind and the lyrics of the songs were penned by Anand Bakshi.

#	Title	Singer(s)
1	"Maine Dil Se Poochha"	Udit Narayan, Alka Yagnik,Suniel Shetty,Deepti Bhatnagar
2	"Dil Junglee Kabootar"	Udit Narayan, Sadhana Sargam
3	"Mujhe Bichchhoo Lad Gaya Re"	Alka Yagnik,Udit Narayan
4	"Rab Ke Saamane"	Udit Narayan, Alka Yagnik
5	"Jo Kaam Tune Kiya Tha"	Udit Narayan,Chorus
6	"Om Krishna"	Mohammad Aziz,Asha Bhosle,Sudesh Bhosle,Sadhana Sargam
