= Badle Ki Aag =

1982 Indian film by Rajkumar Kohli

- Theatrical release poster
- Directed by: Rajkumar Kohli
- Produced by: Rajkumar Kohli
- Starring: Sunil Dutt; Dharmendra; Jeetendra; Reena Roy
- Narrated by: Nishi Kohli
- Music by: Laxmikant–Pyarelal
- Production company: Shankar Movies
- Release date: 27 May 1982
- Running time: 159 minutes
- Country: India
- Language: Hindi

Badle Ki Aag (transl. Flames of Revenge) is a 1982 Hindi-language action thriller film, produced and directed by Rajkumar Kohli under the Shankar Movies banner. It stars Sunil Dutt, Dharmendra, Jeetendra, Reena Roy, Smita Patil and music was composed by Laxmikant–Pyarelal. Badle Ki Aag was a box-office success.

== Cast ==
- Sunil Dutt as Lakhan
  - Armaan Kohli as Child Lakhan
- Dharmendra as Sher Singh "Shera"
- Jeetendra as Inspector Amar Verma
- Reena Roy as Geeta
  - Master Rajesh as Child Geeta
- Smita Patil as Bijli
- Sarika as Asha
- Rajeev Anand as Suraj
- Armaan Kohli as Shera's Son
- Nirupa Roy as Durga
- Kader Khan as Shambhu / Rajaram
- Shakti Kapoor as Dacoit Kallu
- Madan Puri as Mohanlal Verma
- Pran as Senior Police Officer
- Om Prakash as Man Who Needed Money For Daughter's Marriage
- Murad as Kishorilal
- Jankidas as Seth Haveliram
- Azaad Irani as Azad
- Brahmachari as Jantar Mantar
- Joginder Shelly as Zaalim Singh
- H.L. Pardesi as Man Who Spoke Out In Seth Haveliram's Marriage
- Rajan Haksar as Man Who Tried To Rape Savitri
- Ranvir Raj as Inspector Ranveer Singh
- Trilok Kapoor as General Shamsher Singh
- Sulochana Latkar as Savitri
- Sheetal as Mistress
- Urmila Bhatt as Geeta's Foster Mother
- Bhushan Tiwari as Mohanlal's Goon
- Kedarnath Saigal as Man With Bijli
- Ranjan Garewal as Lakhan's Right Hand
- Master Bhagwan as Train Master
- Poonam Kapoor
- Master Monish

== Soundtrack ==
#	Song	Singer
1	"Main Jis Mehfil Mein Jaata Hoon"	Kishore Kumar, Suresh Wadkar, Mahendra Kapoor
2	"Tum Saamne Ho"	Lata Mangeshkar
3	"Jawaani Mein Aate Hai"	Amit Kumar, Suresh Wadkar, Alka Yagnik, Anuradha Paudwal
4	"Yaar Mera Chikna Ghada"	Asha Bhosle, Suresh Wadkar, Sushma Shrestha
5	"Main Bewafa Nahin"	Asha Bhosle, Mahendra Kapoor
6	"Teri Mehfil Mein Hi Tujhko Woh Tamasha Dikhaungi"	Asha Bhosle
