= Deepti Bhatnagar =

Indian former film actress and model

- Bhatnagar in 2013
- Born: 30 September 1967 (age 58); Meerut, Uttar Pradesh, India
- Occupations: Model; actress; television presenter
- Spouse: Randeep Arya
- Relatives: Veerendra (father-in-law)
- Website: www.deeptibhatnagar.com

Deepti Bhatnagar (born 30 September 1967) is a former Indian actress and model known for her work primarily in Hindi and Telugu films, along with a few appearances in other languages. She made her film debut in Ram Shastra (1995), directed by Sanjay Gupta. She gained recognition with the Telugu film Pelli Sandadi (1996), which became the second highest-grossing Telugu film of the year. Bhatnagar also appeared in the American film Inferno (1997) and the Hindi film Mann (1999).

== Early life ==
Bhatnagar was born in Meerut, Uttar Pradesh. She Went to school in Delhi and attended Meerut University. She moved to Mumbai in 1992 to identify a good ad agency to promote her handicrafts factory in Meerut, Uttar Pradesh.

== Career ==
In 1992, Bhatnagar was promoting her handicrafts in Mumbai, when she got an opportunity to sign for an ad agency to model for the Roopmilan saris' press ad and after that ad she signed 12 more campaigns. She had given up her interest in running the handicraft factory and entered into the professional modeling world. She won the Eve's Weekly Miss India contest in 1990. Soon afterwards, she was modeling in Singapore for various international fashion shows.

== Television ==
In 1998, Bhatnagar appeared in a television show Yeh Hai Raaz, replacing Ruby Bhatia in the lead role of a tough cop.

In 2001, she ventured into television production with the travel shows Yatra, a religious travel guide show and Musafir Hoon Yaaron, an around the world travel guide show, both aired on StarPlus. She also hosted both the shows.

She also produced a TV serial Kabhi Aaye Na Judaai in 2003 on StarPlus.

== Personal life ==
Bhatnagar is married to Randeep Arya, the director of her show, Musafir Hoon Yaron. Together they have two sons. Their first son, Shubh, was born in 2003. Six years later, in 2009, they welcomed their second son, Shiv. The couple enjoys a fulfilling family life, balancing their professional careers with the joys and responsibilities of parenthood.

== Filmography ==
=== Film ===
Year	Title	Role	Language
1995	Ram Shastra	Nitu Sinha	Hindi
1996	Pelli Sandadi	Swapna	Telugu
1996	Rajwade	Swapna	Hindi
1997	Dharma Chakkaram	Vijayalakshmi	Tamil
1997	Kaalia	Priya	Hindi
1997	Qahar	Dr.Sapna	Hindi
1997	Inferno	Shalimar	English
1998	Auto Driver	Sravani	Telugu
1998	Hitler	Priya	Hindi
1998	Humse Badhkar Kaun	Venee	Hindi
1999	Dulhan Banoo Main Teri	Radha 'Rani' D. Rai	Hindi
1999	Sultan	Vandana	Telugu
1999	Hum Tum Pe Marte Hain	Hum Banjaare item number	Hindi
1999	Ganga Ki Kasam	Geeta	Hindi
1999	Kaama		Tamil
1999	Mann	Anita Singhania	Hindi
2000	Galate Aliyandru	Dancer	Kannada
2000	Maa Annayya	Radha	Telugu
2000	Snegithiye	Herself	Tamil
2001	Chori Chori Chupke Chupke	Dancer at Ghod Bharai	Hindi
2001	Uljhan	Anjali Mathur	Hindi
2002	Kondaveeti Simhasanam	Rani	Telugu
2002	Agni Varsha	Dancer ('Chal Re Sajan')	Hindi
2004	Rok Sako To Rok Lo	Dev's Bhabhi	Hindi
2007	Raakilipattu	Herself	Malayalam
2021	Pelli SandaD	Older Sahasra (Cameo)	Telugu

=== Music videos ===
Year	Album	Music Video	Other notes
1996	Lal Garara	Lal Garara	Hans Raj Hans
1999–2000	"Yaari Yaari" (music video)	Herself	Music video with Shankar Sahney and Nakul Kapoor, Tips Music
2000	Dance Attack - Featuring Cheshire Cat	Mera Laung Gawacha (Remix)	Bally Sagoo

== See also ==
- List of Hindi film actresses
