= Careful What You Wish For =

Careful What You Wish For may refer to:

== Music ==
- Careful What You Wish For (Jonatha Brooke album), 2007
- Careful What You Wish For (Texas album), 2003
- "Careful What You Wish For", a bonus track on Eminem's album Relapse
- "Careful What You Wish For" (song), a track on Meredith Brooks's album Deconstruction

== Film and television ==
- Careful What You Wish For (2004 film), a short film presented on Amazon Theater
- Careful What You Wish For (film), a 2015 thriller film
- "Careful What You Wish For" (NCIS: New Orleans), a 2015 television episode
- "Careful What You Wish For" (9-1-1), a 2019 television episode
- "Careful What You Wish For" (Holby City), a 2009 television episode

== See also ==
- Be Careful What You Wish For (disambiguation)
