= Our Lady of Perpetual Succour High School =

- OLPS High School, St Anthony's Rd, Chembur; Mumbai, Maharashtra 400071; India

Information
- Other name: OLPS
- Type: Public
- Motto: Let Your Light Shine
- Religious affiliation: Christianity
- Patron saint: Our Lady of Perpetual Help
- Established: 1954
- Sister school: St. Anthony's Girls High School
- School board: SSC
- Chairman: Fr. Louis Menezes CSsR
- Chairperson: Mrs. Nirmala Thakur
- Administrator: Fr. Juvance Serrao
- Principal: Sr. Sheeja Kunjumon
- Headmistress: Sr. Shanti Crasta
- Headmaster: Santosh Souz
- Grades: 1st to the 10th standard
- Gender: Male
- Enrollment: 2640
- Classrooms: 24
- Houses: Yellow, Blue, Green, Red
- Song: "O Let's Lift Up Our Voices"
- Sports: Yes
- Website: www.olpshighschool.org

Our Lady of Perpetual Succour High School, also known as OLPS High School, is a school for boys in Chembur, Mumbai, India. The school celebrates its annual feast on 27 June as the feast of Our Lady of Perpetual Help.

It has alumni across industries including the Bollywood film industry, cricket, television, music and authors.

== History ==
Our Lady of Perpetual Succour High School was established in 1954 by the Redemptorists. The first principal of the school was Fr. Brian McGrath (1930–2019). Dr. Sarto Esteves was the one instrumental in helping the first principal of OLPS High School, Fr. Brian McGrath, an Irish Redemptorist, to raise funds for the school building and this was the beginning of a long association. Our Lady of Perpetual Help is the patron of the school.

== Curriculum and activities ==
The school is affiliated to the Maharashtra State Board of Secondary and Higher Secondary Education for Class One to Tenth Class. It also has kindergarten and nursery for boys. The medium of instruction is English.

The students are grouped into four houses: St. Gerard (Blue); St. Alphonsus (Yellow); St. Clement (Green); and St. Anthony (Red).

Sports activities include cricket, football, basketball, kabaddi and volleyball. OLPS students have consistently excelled in sporting events.

The school band has won many competitions across Mumbai.

== Program for Learning Disability ==
In 2016, the batch of 1988 funded a program called "Mentoring Champs Learning Center" which caters to children who have various learning disabilities, from nursery up to 7th standard (10 classes). Between 2016 and 2022 the program supported 195 students.

== Staff ==
The school is administered by the administaror, Fr. Juvance Serrao CssR and the manager Fr. Louis Menezes CSsR.

=== Secondary section ===
- Head Mistress – Sr. Sheeja Kunjumon SCB (2022-)

=== Primary section ===
- Head Mistress – Sr. Shanthi Crasta

== Notable alumni ==
- Anil Kapoor, actor.
- Sanjay Kapoor, actor.
- Shankar Mahadevan, music composer and singer
- Devdutt Pattanaik, author, mythologist, and leadership consultant
- Eijaz Khan, television and film actor
- Armaan Kohli, actor
- Ram Sampath, music composer
- Aditya Tare, Indian cricketer
- Ajay Jayaram, badminton player
- Kendall Pinto, singer-songwriter
- Abey Kuruvilla, cricketer.

== See also ==
- List of schools in Mumbai
- Congregation of the Most Holy Redeemer (The Redemptorists, founders of the school)
