= Michael Cavanaugh (actor) =

American actor (b. 1942)

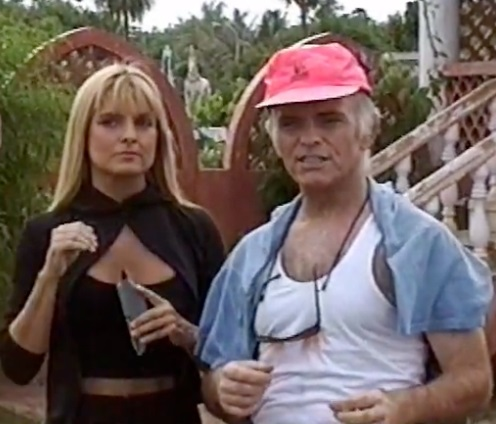
- Cavanaugh (r), with Jillian Kesner-Graver, filming Inferno in 1996
- Born: November 21, 1942 (age 83); New York City, U.S.
- Occupation: Actor
- Years active: 1976–present

Michael Cavanaugh (born November 21, 1942) is an American actor. Cavanaugh was born in New York City, and has performed in more than one hundred films since 1976. His television credits include The West Wing, Joe Bash, Starman, Hunter, Monk and 24.

He served in the United States Navy following graduation from high school and served for three years, stationed in Hawaii.

== Film ==
Film
Year	Title	Role	Notes
1976	The Enforcer	Lalo	
1977	Over-Under Sideways-Down	Rich	
1977	Heroes	Peanuts	
1977	The Gauntlet	Assistant District Attorney John Feyderspiel	
1978	Gray Lady Down	Pete	Uncredited
1979	The Lady in Red	Undercover Cop	
1980	Any Which Way You Can	Patrick Scarfe	
1982	Comeback	Manager	
1982	Forced Vengeance	Stan Raimondi	
1983	Heart Like a Wheel	NHRA Boss	
1986	Iron Eagle	Disclipinary panel colonel	Uncredited
1988	Street of Dreams	Lieutenant Marcus	
1988	Two to Tango	Dean Boyle	
1990	Full Fathom Five	Garvin	
1990	Kid	Walters	
1994	A Passion to Kill	Robinson	
1995	Illegal in Blue	Lieutenant Lyle	Direct-to-video
1996	Night Hunter	Roy Ward	
1996	Crash Dive	Captain Lange	Direct-to-video
1997	Strategic Command	Vice President Charles Baker	
1997	Inferno	Victor Grayson	
1998	Black Thunder	General Barnes	
1999	In Dreams	Judge	Voice
1999	The Haunting	Dr. Malcolm Keogh	
1999	Romp	Norman Fase	
2000	Dancing in September	Harbor	
2000	Escape Under Pressure	Captain	
2000	Militia	Colonel Jim Donaman, Retired	
2001	Ablaze	Chief Sam Davis	
2001	Thy Neighbor's Wife	Ian McMillan	Direct-to-video
2001	Raptor	Colonel Vandamar	Direct-to-video
2002	Collateral Damage	Chairman Paul Devereaux	
2002	Stranded	Admiral Ferrell	Direct-to-video
2002	Red Dragon	Forensic Dentist	
2004	Chance	Mike	Short film
2003	Holes	Judge Austin Gorg	
2006	Down the P.C.H.	Michael O'Hara	
2006	All the King's Men	Mr. Peyton	
2007	Live!	Wilken	
2007	Who's Your Caddy?	John Marshall	
2010	Peep World	Brad Thompkins	
2016	Rules Don't Apply	Methodist Minister	

== Television ==
TV
Year	Title	Role	Notes
1977	Visions	Rich	Episode: "Over-Under, Sideways-Down"
1978	Kojak	Sonny Canavere	Episode: "Justice for All"
1978	Doctor Scorpion	Terry Batliner	TV movie
1979	Dallas	O'Neill	Episode: "The Red File: Part 1"
1979	Portrait of a Stripper	Steve Vector	TV movie
1979	11th Victim	Steve	TV movie
1980	The Rockford Files	John Traynor	Episode: "Deadlock in Parma"
1980	Charlie's Angels	Anthony Felber	Episode: "Harrigan's Angel"
1980	Belle Starr	Jesse James	TV movie
1980	Gideon's Trumpet	Stocker	TV movie
1980	A Rumor of War	Captain Lake	TV miniseries
1980	Diff'rent Strokes	Woody	Episode: "The Bank Job"
1981	CHiPs	Tom Dempsey	Episode: "Home Fires Burning"
1981	Miracle on Ice	George	TV movie
1981	Vegas	Vance	Episode: "The Killing"
1981	The Texas Rangers	Bobby Joe Ames	TV movie
1981	Fitz and Bones	Joe	Episode: "Terror at Newsline 3"
1982	One Day at a Time	Gunman	Episode: "Stick 'em Up"
1983	T. J. Hooker	Carl Hines	Episode: "The Mumbler"
1983	Tales of the Gold Monkey	Avery Thiel	Episode: "A Distant Shout of Thunder"
1983	Blood Feud	U.S. Marshal	TV movie
1983	Matt Houston	Byron Stevens	
1983	For Love and Honor	Pelham	Episode: "For Love and Honor (Pilot)
1983	Night Partners	Roy Henderson	TV movie
1983	The Mississippi		Episode: "Town Without Pity"
1984	The A-Team	Joseph King	Episode: "Deadly Maneuvers"
1984	Hunter	Captain Cain	Episode: "Hunter" (pilot episode)
1984	Matt Houston	George Davis	Episode: “Eyewitness”
1985	Highway to Heaven	Coach	Episode: "As Difficult as ABC"
1985	A Death in California	Gene Brooks	2 episodes
1985	Airwolf	Patrick Stoner	Episode: "Fortune Teller"
1985	Amazing Stories	John Lefferts - Storekeeper	Episode: "Alamo Jobe"
1984–1985	Cagney & Lacey	Lieutenant Johnson / Detective #1	2 episodes
1985	Hostage Flight	Bill Orfman	TV movie
1985	Final Jeopardy	Garage Attendant	TV movie
1986	MacGyver	Michael Donahue / Viking	Episode: "Countdown"
1986	Scarecrow and Mrs. King	Gerald Falken	Episode: "The Triumvirate"
1986	Joe Bash	Lieutenant Pendleton	2 episodes
1986	Second Serve	Gene Scott	TV movie
1985–1986	Santa Barbara	District Attorney Tony Patterson	12 episodes
1986–1987	Starman	George Fox	22 episodes
1987	Our House	Mac Hoover	2 episodes
1988	Promised a Miracle	Detective	TV movie
1988	Street of Dreams	Lieutenant Marcus	TV movie
1989	L.A. Law	Paul Richardson	Episode: "The Accidental Jurist"
1989	Wolf		Episode: "Wolf"
1990	Tour of Duty	Major General Proctor	Episode: "Three Cheers for the Orange, White and Blue"
1990	Star Trek: The Next Generation	Captain Robert DeSoto	Episode: "Tin Man"
1990	People Like Us	Michael Jordan	TV movie
1991	Held Hostage: The Sis and Jerry Levin Story	Kaplan	TV movie
1991	Matlock	Al Brown / Marvin Latham	Episode: "The Arsonist"
1991	Dark Shadows	Sheriff George Patterson / Andres Du Pres	
1991	Marilyn and Me	Walter Winchell	TV movie
1991	False Arrest	Dr. Chandler	TV movie
1992	FBI: The Untold Stories		Episode: "D.B. Cooper/McCoy Skyjacking"
1992	Just Deserts	Campbell Cunningham	TV movie
1992	Somebody's Daughter	Aarons	TV movie
1992	Angel Street		TV movie
1993	Dr. Quinn, Medicine Woman	Craig Harding	Episode: "Bad Water"
1993	Sworn to Vengeance	Pete Hall	TV movie
1993	The Fire Next Time	Seth	Episode #1.2
1993	Prophet of Evil: The Ervil LeBaron Story		TV movie
1993	Donato and Daughter	Vinnie Stellino	TV movie
1993	The X-Files	Sheriff Jack Withers	Episode: "Conduit"
1993	Lois & Clark: The New Adventures of Superman	Dr. Carlton	Episode: "Smart Kids"
1994	Renegade	Police Sergeant Ben Clancy	Episode: "Once Burned, Twice Chey"
1994	Tonya & Nancy: The Inside Story	Evy Scotvold	TV movie
1994	ER	Suzanne's Dad	Episode: "24 Hours"
1995	Vanishing Son	Marcek	5 episodes
1995	Liz: The Elizabeth Taylor Story	Walter Wanger	TV movie
1995	Eye of the Stalker	Judge Warren Curtis	TV movie
1995	Wing Commander IV: The Price of Freedom	Telamon Doctor	Video game
1996	High Tide		Episode: "Sins of the Mother"
1996	Pacific Blue	Curtis Bilson	Episode: "The Phoenix"
1996	The Burning Zone	Pilot	Episode: "Night Flight"
1996	NYPD Blue	Len	Episode: "Caulksmanship"
1997	The Secret World of Alex Mack	Dean	Episode: "The Switch"
1997	L.A. Heat	Timothy Scully	Episode: "Green Justice"
1997	Breast Men	Harry	
1998	The Practice	Primate Center Director	Episode: "Food Chains"
1997–1998	C-16: FBI	Dennis Grassi	10 episodes
1998	Nothing Sacred		Episode: "Sleeping Dogs"
1999	Mutiny		
2000	Any Day Now		Episode: "Life"
2000	The West Wing	Pharmaceutical Executive	Episode: "In This White House"
2001	Warden of Red Rock	Senator Paul Townsend	TV movie
2001	When Billie Beat Bobby	Brother John	TV movie
2001	Epoch	Williams	TV movie
2002	Push, Nevada		3 episodes
2002	The Agency	Mr. Barnes	Episode: "Home Grown"
2003	Mister Sterling		Episode: "Human Error"
2003	Boston Public	Judge Boilings	Episode: "Chapter Sixty-Seven"
2003	Carnivàle	Talkative Hobo	Episode: "Pick a Number"
2004	24	Joseph O'Laughlin	
2004	Las Vegas	Heyman	Episode: "Blood Is Thicker"
2005	Higglytown Heroes	Tailor Hero	Episode: "Wayne's Ripping Adventure/Meet Eubie's Cousin"
2005	Point Pleasant	Harland	Episode: "Pilot"
2005	Just Legal		Episode: "Pilot"
2005	E-Ring	U.S. Ambassador: Suriname	Episode: "Weekend Pass"
2005	Medium	Defense Attorney	Episode: "Still Life"
2006	Bones	Senator Alan Corman	Episode: "The Woman in the Garden"
2006	Cold Case	David Poole	Episode: "The Hen House"
2005–2007	Monk	Bobby Davenport	2 episodes
2007	The Unit	Committee Chair Locke	Episode: "Pandemonium: Part 1"
2007	Shark	Judge Newman	2 episodes
2008	Eli Stone	District Attorney Lowell Grayson	Episode: "Something to Save"
2008	Without a Trace	Richard Conlon	Episode: "Last Call"
2009	FlashForward	SETI Chairman Warren Moore	Episode: "Gimme Some Truth"
2003–2011	The Young and the Restless	Judge Phelps / Franklin J. Becker	11 episodes
2017	Back to Love	Roger	TV movie

== Web series ==
Web series
Year	Title	Role	Notes
2018	The Watch	The Watch Maker	Episode: "The Gift of Time"
2020	Smartphone Theatre	various	3 episodes (anthology series)
