= Rajkumar Kohli =

Indian film director (1930–2023)

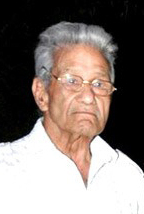
- Born: 14 September 1930; Lahore, Punjab, British India (present day Lahore, Pakistan)
- Died: 24 November 2023 (aged 93); Mumbai, Maharashtra, India
- Occupations: Film director Film producer
- Years active: 1963–2002
- Spouse: Nishi
- Children: Armaan Kohli; Rajnish Kohli

Rajkumar Kohli (14 September 1930 – 24 November 2023) was an Indian film director. He was famous for directing several popular Bollywood films like Lootera (1965) starring Dara Singh and Nishi (Nishi later married Kohli) as well as Punjabi films such as Dulla Bhatti (1966). His other notable Hindi films included films with ensemble cast such as Nagin (1976), Jaani Dushman (1979), Badle Ki Aag (1982), Naukar Biwi Ka (1983), Raaj Tilak (1984) etc. His films frequently featured actors like Sunil Dutt, Dharmendra, Jeetendra, Shatrughan Sinha as well as actresses Reena Roy, Anita Raj.

In the early 1990s, Kohli introduced his son Armaan Kohli in the multi-starrer action film Virodhi (1992). He directed his son again in Aulad Ke Dushman (1993) and Qahar (1997). After a hiatus, he returned in 2002 and relaunched his son in another film in the style of his classic 1970s films Nagin and Jaani Dushman titled Jaani Dushman: Ek Anokhi Kahani. However, upon release it was a box office disaster and was heavily criticised.

Kohli died from a heart attack on 24 November 2023, at the age of 93.

== Filmography ==
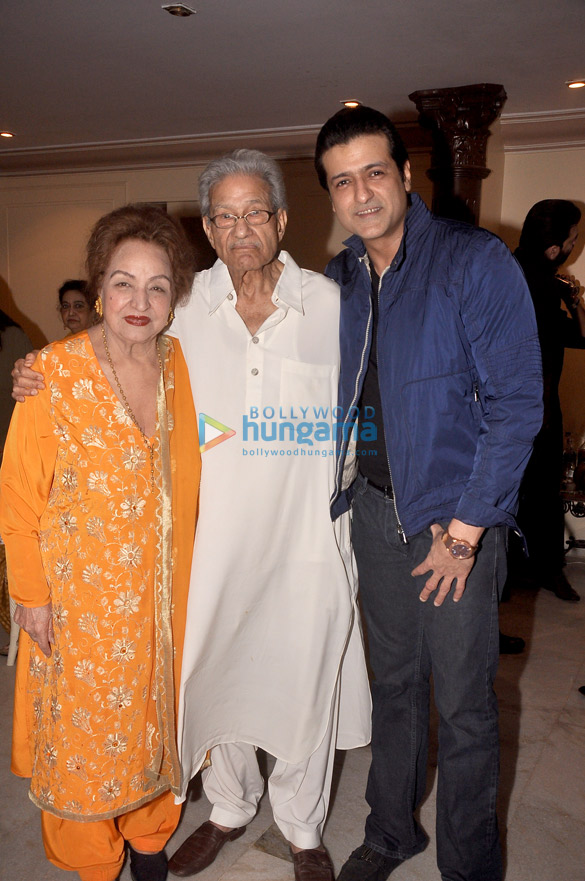
Kohli with his wife Nishi and son Armaan in 2015

=== As director ===
- 1973 – Kahani Hum Sab Ki
- 1976 – Nagin
- 1979 – Jaani Dushman
- 1979 – Muqabla
- 1982 – Badle Ki Aag
- 1983 – Naukar Biwi Ka
- 1984 – Raaj Tilak
- 1984 – Jeene Nahi Doonga
- 1987 – Insaniyat Ke Dushman
- 1988 – Inteqaam
- 1988 – Saazish
- 1989 – Bees Saal Baad
- 1990 – Pati Patni Aur Tawaif
- 1992 – Virodhi
- 1993 – Aulad Ke Dushman
- 1997 – Qahar
- 2002 – Jaani Dushman: Ek Anokhi Kahani

=== As producer ===
- Virodhi (1992)
- Gora Aur Kala (1972) Hindi Movie
- Danka (1969) Hindi Movie
- Dulla Bhatti (1966) Punjabi Movie
- Lootera (1965) Hindi Movie
- Main Jatti Punjab Di (1964) Punjabi Movie
- Pind Di Kurhi (1963) Punjabi Movie
- Sapni (1963) Punjabi Movie
