= Chahatt Khanna =

Indian actress (born 1986)

- Born: 17 July 1986 (age 40); Mumbai, Maharashtra, India
- Other name: Chahatt Khanna Mirza
- Occupation: Actress
- Years active: 2005–present
- Spouses: Bharat Narsinghani (m. 2006; div. 2007) Farhan Mirza (m. 2013; div. 2018)
- Children: 2

Chahatt Khanna (born 17 July 1986 in Mumbai) is an Indian actress who works in Hindi films and television. Khanna is known for playing Ayesha Sharma in Bade Achhe Lagte Hain and Nida Beg in Qubool Hai.

== Career ==
Chahatt started her career at the age of 16. Her first shoot was in a Cadbury's advertisement, with Pradeep Sarkar in 2002. Her first TV show was also from 2002, called Sachi Baat Sabhi Jag Jane. Her first break in movies was with 7½ Phere. The same year she was seen as one of the cast of the thriller The Film (2005). The movie revolves around the lives of struggling film artists. Chahatt also did a cameo in the show Hero - Bhakti Hi Shakti Hai in 2005, she was playing the role of Queen Mayra.

She was later seen in Sony TV's show Kajjal.

In 2009, she was seen in Ek Main Ek Tum and later in squad leader on MTV Stuntmania.

== Personal life ==
Khanna met businessman Bharat Narsinghani when she was 16. The couple dated for six years before getting married in December 2006. They divorced several months later, with the actor alleging that Narsinghani and his family had physically and emotionally abused her.

On 8 February 2013, she married Farhan Mirza, the son of Bollywood writer Shahrukh Mirza. The couple has two daughters. Khanna filed for divorce in 2018 citing sexual and mental harassment. After marriage, Chahatt had converted to Islam but upon divorce, she reverted to Hinduism.

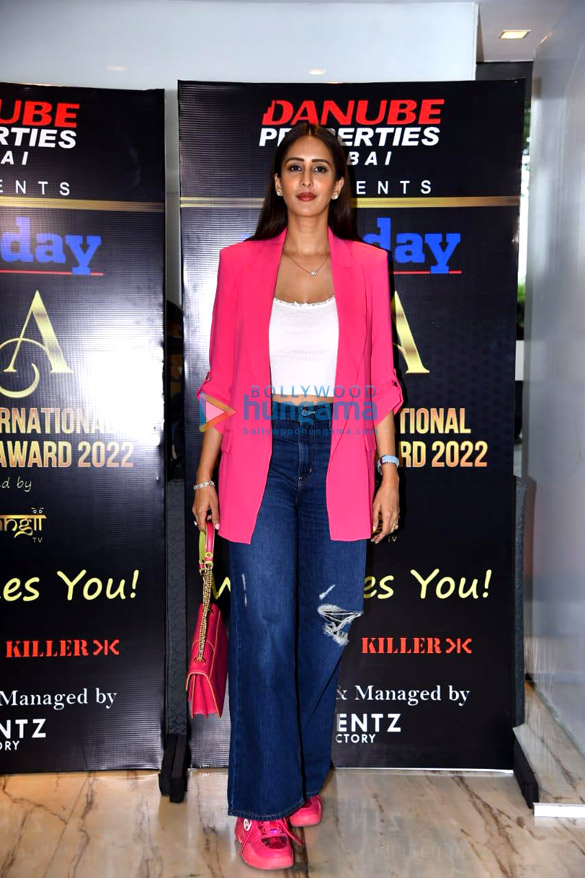
Chahatt Khanna attends the Mid-day India International Influencer Awards 2022

== Filmography ==
=== Films ===
Years	Title	Roles	Notes
2005	The Film	Ankita Kulkarni	
2005	7½ Phere..More Than a wedding	Piyaali "Piya" Joshi	
2010	Ek Main Ek Tum	Chahat	
2011	Thank You	Kanishka	
2019	Prassthanam	Palak	
2023	Yaatris	Sonam	

=== Television ===
Years	Title	Roles	Notes	Ref.
2005	Hero - Bhakti Hi Shakti Hai	Princess Myra	8 episodes	
2006	Kumkum – Ek Pyara Sa Bandhan	Aashka Wadhwa		
2007	Kaajjal	Katie / Kaajjal		
2011–2013	Bade Achhe Lagte Hain	Ayesha Sharma Kapoor	Recurring role	
2014	Qubool Hai	Nida		
2015	Darr Sabko Lagta Hai	Richa	Episode 4	
