= Johny Aala Re =

- The promotional logo image of "Johny Aala Re".
- Created by: Zee TV
- Directed by: ??
- Starring: Johnny Lever
- Opening theme: "Johny Aala Re"
- Country of origin: India
- No. of episodes: ???

Production
- Running time: approx. 24 minutes

Original release
- Network: Zee TV
- Release: 5 June 2006 – December 2006

Johny Aala Re is a Hindi comedy show on Zee TV hosted and produced by famous Indian comedian, Johnny Lever.

== Concept ==
The show consists of various segments, some permanent and some that keep changing to have you guessing and asking for more.

=== Segment 1 ===
Stand up by Johnny (Topical)

=== Segment 2 ===
Gags (funny skits by a set of actors)/ Johnny in disguise

=== Segment 3 ===
Main Bhi Johnny- a contest wherein a video booth will be taken out on the streets to invite the common man to showcase his talent. One winner from 3 final contestants will be called on stage to perform.

=== Segment 4 ===
Slice of Life- (Johnny interviews the common man/ celebrities wherein they showcase their talents)

=== Segment 5 ===
Picturized gag leading into a parody (Johny dancing on re-recorded songs with funny lyrics incorporated in funny situations)
