= Yaatris =

2023 Indian drama film

- Official release poster
- Directed by: Harish Vyas
- Written by: Aryan Saha
- Produced by: Kuku Mohanka
- Starring: Raghubir Yadav; Seema Pahwa; Anuraag Malhan; Jamie Lever; Chahatt Khanna
- Cinematography: Farukh Mistry
- Edited by: Vikas Arora; Gaurangi Vyas
- Music by: Saurabh Kalsi Bhuvan Ahuja; Rohit Sharma
- Production company: Akion Entertainment
- Release date: 6 October 2023
- Country: India
- Language: Hindi

Yaatris (transl. Travellers) is a 2023 Indian Hindi-language comedy drama film directed by Harish Vyas and written by Aryan Saha. It stars Raghubir Yadav, Seema Pahwa, Anuraag Malhan, Jamie Lever and Chahatt Khanna. The film was released on 6 October 2023.

== Synopsis ==
A dysfunctional middle-class family from Banaras, the Sharmas, embark on a life-changing adventure as they navigate love, humour, and life lessons in a touching story of community.

== Cast ==
- Raghubir Yadav as Pushkar Sharma
- Seema Pahwa as Saroj
- Anuraag Malhan as Mohan
- Jamie Lever as Meenu
- Chahatt Khanna

== Reception ==
Archika Khurana of The Times of India gave 3 stars out of 5 and said that "'Yaatris' successfully balances humour with heartfelt moments, making it a light-hearted family entertainer." Times Now rated it 3/5 stars and said that "If you are looking for a light-hearted movie that you can watch with your family, then Yaatris should be your pick. It is a good one-time watch that will make you want to give a big hug to your family members." Aman Wadhwa of DNA writes that "Yaatris is the perfect recipe of how not to make a film because it is endlessly boring, unfunny, and tiring." Deepa Gahlot of Rediff.com rated it 1.5/5 stars and said that "Yaatris works neither as a comedy (Jamie Lever's funny gal potential sadly unused), nor as a family drama, which, for an Indian film should have been a breeze, considering how much of it goes around in films and TV with enough to spare for OTT."
