= Virodhi (1992 film) =

1992 Indian film by Rajkumar Kohli

- Poster of the film
- Directed by: Rajkumar Kohli
- Story by: Lalit Mahajan
- Produced by: Rajkumar Kohli
- Starring: Armaan Kohli; Harsha Mehra
- Cinematography: Thomas Xavier
- Edited by: Shiv Kumar Sharma
- Music by: Anu Malik
- Release date: 3 April 1992
- Running time: 140 minutes
- Country: India
- Language: Hindi

Virodhi is a 1992 Indian Bollywood crime drama film produced and directed by Rajkumar Kohli. It marks the debut of Armaan Kohli and Harsha Mehra, with Sunil Dutt, Dharmendra and Anita Raj in pivotal roles. An ensemble supporting cast of villains are also featured including Raza Murad, Shakti Kapoor, Gulshan Grover, Paresh Rawal, Kiran Kumar and Amjad Khan.

== Plot ==
Inspector Shekhar gets involved in an illegal case which involves ministers like Pandey Sahib & his alliances. When Inspector Shekhar tries to bring justice against them he gets killed by the hooligans of Pandey Sahib. It's up to his younger brother Raj to avenge his brother's death by trusting law and justice or by taking the law into his own hands.

== Cast ==
- Armaan Kohli as Raj
- Harsha Mehra as Pinky Kapoor
- Sunil Dutt as Police Commissioner Jagdish Kapoor
- Dharmendra as Inspector Shekhar
- Anita Raj as Mrs. Shekhar
- Roopa Ganguly as Reena
- Prem Chopra as Bhagwat Pandey
- Paresh Rawal as Badrinath Pandey
- Gulshan Grover as Rocky Pandey
- Shakti Kapoor as Pratap
- Raza Murad as Vithalrao Patil
- Kiran Kumar as Kumar
- Amjad Khan as Judge
- Sharat Saxena as Inspector Amar Singh
- Shiva Rindani as Inspector Naagraj
- Bharat Kapoor as Sub Inspector Gopal Verma
- Dan Dhanoa as Sub Inspector Naresh Sehgal
- Rajeev Anand as Vikram
- Mahaveer Bhullar as College Goon
- Kamalraj Bhasin as Hawaldar
- Rajan Haksar as Inspector
- Janakidas as Janakidas
- Ghanshyam Rohera as Restaurant Manager Mishra
- Naushad Abbas as Fighter
- Harbans Darshan M. Arora as Politician
- Surendra Rahi as Man In Crowd
- Kedarnath Saigal as Advocate
- Rajeet Sood as Principal
- Sunita as Lady Inspector

== Soundtrack ==
All songs are written by Dev Kohli.

Song	Singer
"Tere Mere Pyar Ka Aisa Naata"	Mohammed Aziz, Kumar Sanu, Sarika Kapoor
"Nain Kabootar"	Asha Bhosle, Kumar Sanu
"Jaanam Jaanam"	Asha Bhosle, Kumar Sanu
"Ek Chumma De De"	Amit Kumar
"Chullubhar Pani Mein"	Udit Narayan
