= 7½ Phere =

7 1/2 Phere: More Than a Wedding
- Movie poster
- Directed by: Ishaan Trivedi
- Written by: Ishaan Trivedi
- Produced by: Nimit Modawal
- Starring: Juhi Chawla; Irfan Khan; Manoj Pahwa; Neena Kulkarni; Anang Desai; Ninad Kamat; Vallabh Vyas; Manini De; Chahat Khanna
- Cinematography: Attar Singh Saini
- Music by: Shantanu Moitra; Bally Jagpat; A. R. Rahman; Kalyanji–Anandji
- Production company: Epitome Entertainment Pvt. Ltd.
- Release date: 29 July 2005 (India)
- Running time: 136 minutes
- Country: India
- Language: Hindi

7 1/2 Phere: More Than a Wedding (Note: The title being a play on the Indian wedding ceremony known as saat phere or seven rounds.) is a 2005 Indian Hindi-language black comedy film directed by Ishaan Trivedi and produced by Nimit Modawal. It stars Juhi Chawla and Irrfan Khan in the lead roles. The film was released in India on 29 July 2005, to mixed response.

== Plot ==
After having tasted great success with soaps based on traditional families, a national TV network is getting into the next phase of programming - that is, "Reality TV," so they decide to go for the evergreen subject of marriages in the Indian family. Channel asks their blue-eyed guy to produce the show. Asmi Ganatra (Juhi Chawla), the first-time director, and her team find out that at present the only family in Mumbai that meets the programming brief is Joshi's.

The Joshis are stunned when Asmi visits them with a request to cover the marriage for the TV network. Though the bride's father is willing to go along with the idea, the family's Mafia, consisting of the old guard, plays the card of the family's pride, and they Veto the proposal. In the meantime, Asmi has discovered that Manoj Joshi (Irrfan), the bride's youngest uncle, has fallen for her.

Knowing very well that her career would be blocked if she were unable to pull off the deal with the bride's family, she lures him to an arrangement where a multicamera set-up is secretly installed in the huge house.

Manoj realizes to his horror that he has opened Pandora's box. Unaware of the hidden cameras, his family behaves true to themselves, and slowly skeletons start tumbling out of the cupboard. The privacy of Joshi's family gets invaded by candid cameras, and incidents that should remain buried come out in the open and give the channel all sorts of maal masala (juicy tidbits) to increase their TRP ratings.

== Cast ==
- Juhi Chawla as Asmi Ganatra
- Irrfan Khan as Manoj
- Manoj Pahwa as Inspector Rohit Kande
- Nina Kulkarni as Rati Pant
- Anang Desai as Suresh Joshi
- Shri Vallabh Vyas as Mahesh 'Taoji' Joshi
- Manini De as Raveena Joshi
- Chahat Khanna as Piya S. Joshi
- Manish Chaudhary as Nimit Joshi
- Ninad Kamat
- Shauni Khanna
- Hemant Choudhary as TV Show Hero
- Rushad Rana
- Ashok Banthia

== Reception ==
Hindustan Times praised the film, calling it light-hearted and rib-tickling. They noted it as the first time that actors Juhi Chawla and Irrfan Khan had worked together in a film, and as being both Irrfan's entry into and Juhi's return to the comedy genre. They advised that the chemistry between the two actors was to be watched and appreciated as their "conflict and resolution form an integral part of the film."

== Soundtrack ==
#	Song name	Singer	Composer	Lyrics	Notes
1	"Aao Nee Kudiyon"	Sunidhi Chauhan	Shantanu Moitra	Subrat Sinha	
2	"Kyun Aaj Kaa"	Antara Choudhary	Shantanu Moitra	Subrat Sinha	
3	"Aaja Soneya"	Shazia Manzoor	Bally Jagpat	Shazia Manzoor	
4	"Aika Dhondiba"	Pronali Chaliha	Shantanu Moitra	Manrel Gaikwad	
5	"Jiya Jale"	Lata Mangeshkar	A.R. Rahman	Gulzar	Originally from movie Dil Se, 1998
6	"Dil Se Re"	A.R. Rahman	A.R. Rahman	Gulzar	Originally from movie Dil Se, 1998
7	"Tera Saath Hai Kitna Pyare"	Babul Supriyo, Anupama Deshpande	Kalyanji Anandji	Indivar	Originally from movie Janbaaz, 1986
8	"Kyun Aaj Kaa"	Hema Sardesai	Kalyanji Anandji	Indivar	Originally from movie Don, 1978

== See also ==
- Saat phere
- Saptapadi
