= Veer (1995 film) =

- Directed by: Kanti Shah
- Written by: Kanti Shah
- Screenplay by: Mangesh Kulkarni
- Produced by: Surekha Gawli
- Starring: Dharmendra; Gautami; Jaya Pradha; Armaan Kohli
- Edited by: Jeetendra Chawda
- Music by: Dilip Sen; Sameer Sen
- Production company: Jockey Films
- Release date: 1 September 1995
- Running time: 124 min
- Country: India
- Language: Hindi

Veer is a 1995 Indian action film directed by Kanti Shah and produced by Surekha Gawli. It stars Dharmendra, Jaya Pradha, Gautami and Armaan Kohli in lead roles.

== Plot ==
The film revolves around the life of Veer, a patriotic person who fights against the underworld.

== Cast ==
- Dharmendra as Veer / Ram (Double Role)
- Jaya Prada as Rani
- Armaan Kohli as Arjun
- Gautami as Rekha Singh
- Kader Khan as Shyam / Advocate Vishwanath (Double Role)
- Mukesh Khanna as Tiger
- Goga Kapoor as Police Commissioner Randhir Singh
- Kiran Kumar as Inspector Amar Mukhtar
- Deepak Shirke as Chikoo Tandia
- Rami Reddy as Khaali Chua
- Ishrat Ali as Shabbir Lukka
- Brownie Parasher as Gomes
- Tiku Talsania as Narayan Mathur

== Music ==
The music of the film is composed by duo of Sameer Sen and Dilip Sen while lyrics are penned by Faiz Anwar, Rani Malik, Poonam, Shyam Anuragi and Maya Govind.

#	Title	Singer(s)	Lyricist(s)
1	"Balle Balle"	Sudesh Bhosle, Bali Brahmbhatt, Dilip Sen	Maya Govind
2	"Dhoom Dhadaka"	Kumar Sanu, Poornima	Poonam
3	"Gore Gore Gaal Mere"	Poornima, Dilip Sen	Maya Govind
4	"Tere Hain Hum"	Kumar Sanu, Alka Yagnik	Rani Malik
5	"Take It Easy"	Abhijeet, Pradeep Lad	Shyam Anuragi
