= Armaan Kohli =

Indian actor

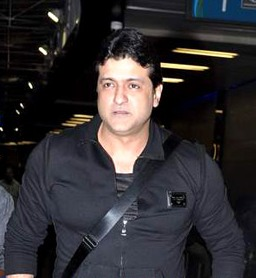
- Kohli in 2013
- Born: Mumbai, Maharashtra, India
- Occupation: Actor
- Years active: 1986–2015
- Height: 183 cm (6 ft 0 in)
- Parents: Rajkumar Kohli (father); Nishi (mother)

Armaan Kohli is a former Indian actor. He is the son of film director Rajkumar Kohli and actress Nishi, and is most known for his role in Jaani Dushman.

== Career ==
Armaan made his debut as a leading actor in his father's 1992 film Virodhi. He was set to star in Deewana opposite the late actress Divya Bharti, but walked out of the film after completing the first shooting schedule and later Shah Rukh Khan was penciled in as his replacement. Kohli was also considered for the lead role for Baazigar, but that role too eventually went to Shah Rukh Khan. Similarly, he opted out of Dilwale Dulhania Le Jayenge and his role was eventually played by Parmeet Sethi.

Kohli starred in several other films in the 1990s including Dushman Zamana (1992), Anaam (1993) and Aulad Ke Dushman which failed at the box office. His father tried to revive his career with the 1997 film Qahar (1997) where he co-starred with Sunny Deol and Sunil Shetty, which was a modest commercially successful due to good collections in tier 2 tier 3, tier 4 cities and small villages but its modest success still failed to revive the career of Armaan Kohli.

After a five-year hiatus, he returned with the multi-starrer Jaani Dushman: Ek Anokhi Kahani which also failed to do well. In this film he was reintroduced with a new name 'Munish Kohli', and carried on with this name in subsequent films.

In September 2013, he joined the reality television series Bigg Boss 7 as a contestant.

Kohli made another comeback to Bollywood after 12 years, playing a negative role in the Rajshri Productions Salman Khan starrer Prem Ratan Dhan Payo which released on 12 November 2015.

== Personal life ==
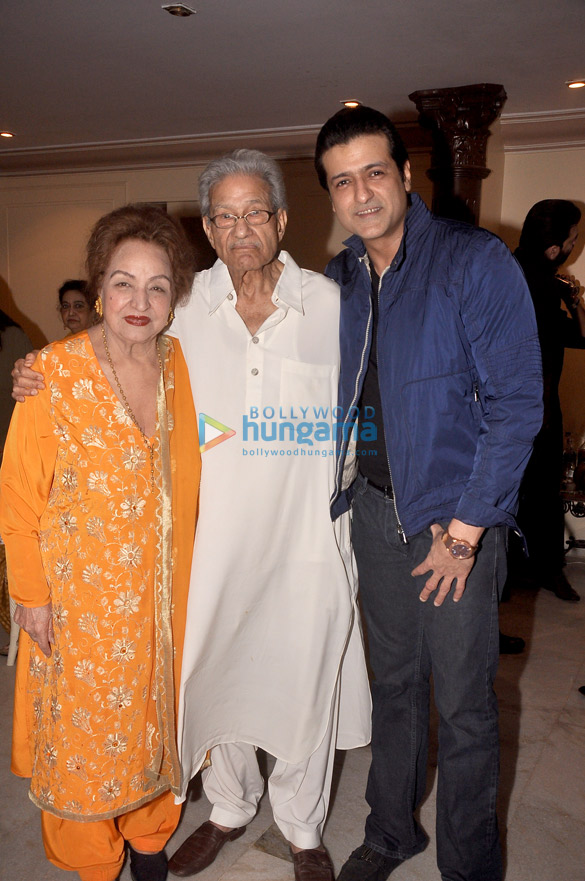
Kohli with his parents in 2015

Kohli was born to film director Rajkumar Kohli and actress Nishi. He studied at Our Lady of Perpetual Succour High School in Chembur until he dropped out in Class IX. Kohli appeared as a child artist in two films directed by his father: Badle Ki Aag (1982) and Raaj Tilak (1984). On 16 December 2013, Kohli was arrested for alleged physical abuse with his co-participant, Sofia Hayat, during the show Bigg Boss 7 . He was released on bail next day.

Armaan Kohli was arrested in June 2018 by Mumbai Police after his girlfriend Neetu Randhawa had lodged a complaint against him citing physical assault. However, she later withdrew her complaint.

Kohli was arrested in August 2021 by Narcotics Control Bureau over possession of 1.2 grams of cocaine. He was granted bail in September 2022 after being in jail for a year.

== Filmography ==
Year	Film	Role	Notes
1982	Badle Ki Aag	Young Laakhan	Child Artist
1984	Raaj Tilak	-	Child Artist
1992	Virodhi	Raj	Debut film
1992	Dushman Zamana	Vijay	
1992	Anaam	Sikandar H. Ali/Jony K. D'Souza/Aakash/Rocky/Prince	
1993	Koyal	Koya	
1993	Kohra	Inspector Anand Sharma	
1993	Aulad Ke Dushman	Vikram Chaudhary	
1994	Juaari	Vijay	
1995	Veer	Arjun	
1997	Qahar	Krishna	
2002	Dushmani	-	
2002	Jaani Dushman: Ek Anokhi Kahani	Kapil	
2003	LOC: Kargil	Major Vikas Vohra	
2014	Mukka	Not Known	Dubbed in Bhojpuri as Dushman Ke Khoon Paani Ha
2015	Prem Ratan Dhan Payo	Chirag Singh	

== Television ==
Year	Name	Role	Finish
2013	Bigg Boss 7	Contestant	6th Place
