= Inferno (1997 film) =

1997 film directed by Fred Olen Ray

- VHS cover art
- Directed by: Fred Olen Ray
- Written by: Sean O'Bannon
- Produced by: Ashok Amritraj; Andrew Stevens; Roger Corman
- Starring: Don Wilson; Deepti Bhatnagar; R. Madhavan
- Cinematography: Gary Graver
- Music by: Jeff Walton
- Production company: Royal Oaks Entertainment
- Release dates: April 22, 1997 (Greece); February 24, 1998 (U.S.)
- Running time: 82 minutes
- Country: United States
- Language: English

Inferno (also released as Operation Cobra) is a 1997 American film directed by Fred Olen Ray starring Don Wilson, Deepti Bhatnagar and R. Madhavan. Evan Lurie, Michael Cavanaugh and Tané McClure appear in other pivotal roles. This is Madhavan's first credited role.

== Plot synopsis ==
Don Wilson plays Kyle Connors, an Interpol agent who travels to India on a revenge mission against the terrorist who killed his partner.

== Cast ==
- Don "The Dragon" Wilson as Kyle Connors
- Deepti Bhatnagar as Shalimar
- R. Madhavan (credited as Mahadevan) as Ravi
- Evan Lurie as Johan Davaad
- Richard Hill as Trevor
- Tane McClure as Callista
- Michael Cavanaugh as Grayson
- Jillian Kesner as Jasmine
Production, India, July 1996

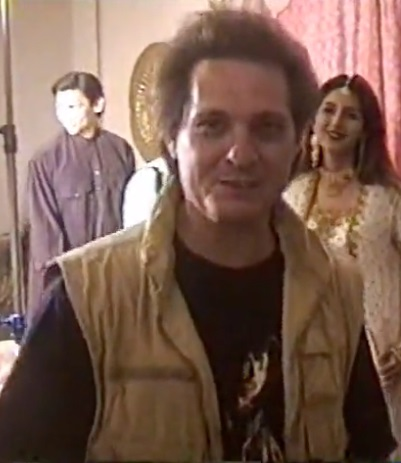
Director Fred Olen Ray. Don "The Dragon" Wilson and Deepti Bhatnagar are in the background.

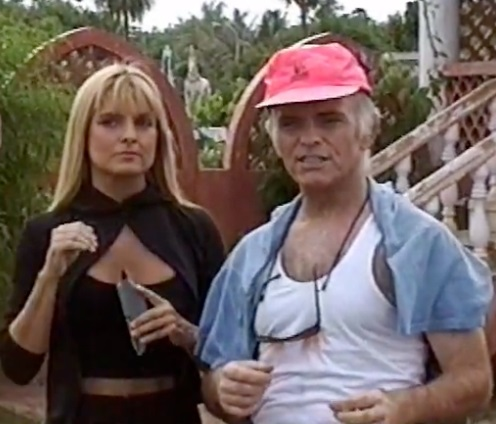
Jillian Kesner and Michael Cavanaugh

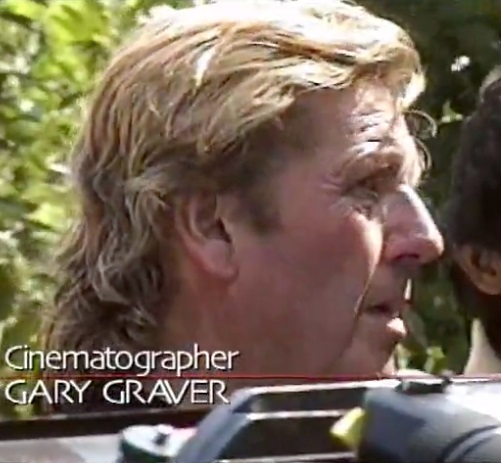
Cinematographer Gary Graver

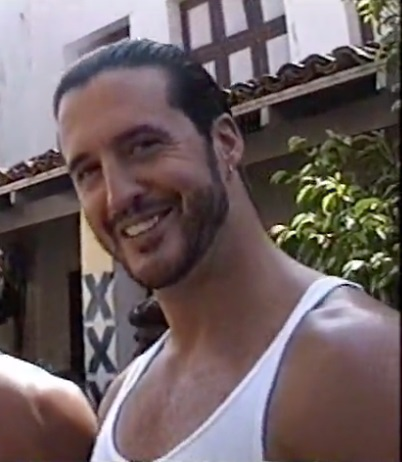
Evan Lurie

== Production ==
Don Wilson worked on the script of the film with director Fred Olen Ray and producers Ashok Amritraj and Sunanda Murali Manohar during early 1996, before beginning the shoot at MGR Film City in Chennai, India in July. Filming for the first time in India, Ray recruited local Indian actors including actor R. Madhavan and actress Deepti Bhatnagar to portray roles in the project.

== Release ==
The film is reported to have done average business as a result of its video release.

The film was later dubbed into Tamil as Vegham in 2001, to capitalize on Madhavan's new-found fame after Alai Payuthey. Madhavan expressed his disappointment at film distributors for trying to pass the project off as a straight Tamil film. Golden Lotus Entertainments dubbed and released the film in Telugu as Secret Agent 786, with dialogue by Malluri Venkat and editing by Trinath.
