= Yatra (2002 TV series) =

- Logo image of "Yatra" with host Deepti Bhatnagar.
- Presented by: Deepti Bhatnagar
- Country of origin: India
- No. of seasons: 1
- No. of episodes: 117

Production
- Producer: Deepti Bhatnagar
- Running time: approx. 52 minutes

Original release
- Network: STAR Plus
- Release: 7 July 2002 – 2003

Yatra is an Indian religious travel guide television program that was broadcast on STAR Plus. Produced and hosted by Deepti Bhatnagar and sometimes by Nilanjana Sharma, Kavita Paudwal, Keerti Gaekwad Kelkar & Tia Bajpai, the program focuses on a spiritual journey around the Indian temples. The series premiered on 7 July 2002, and aired Sunday mornings. The word Yatra in Hindi language, and almost all other Indian languages, means "travel", more usually "travel to spiritual places".
