= Ram Shastra =

- Release poster
- Directed by: Sanjay Gupta
- Written by: Sanjay Gupta; Dialogues: Anand Wardhan
- Produced by: Firoz A. Nadiadwala
- Starring: Jackie Shroff; Aditya Pancholi; Manisha Koirala; Dipti Bhatnagar
- Cinematography: Thomas A. Xavier
- Edited by: Afaque Husain
- Music by: Score: Aadesh Shrivastava; Songs: Anu Malik
- Production company: Base Industries Group
- Release date: 1995
- Country: India
- Language: Hindi
- Budget: ₹3.25 crore
- Box office: ₹4.61 crore

Ram Shastra (transl. Ram's Weapon) is a 1995 Indian Hindi-language action film directed by Sanjay Gupta. The cast of the film includes Jackie Shroff, Aditya Pancholi, Manisha Koirala and Deepti Bhatnagar in the lead roles.

The film's theme is inspired from the 1990 American film Hard To Kill and had earlier been remade in 1994 as Cheetah.

== Story ==
Dhonga, a wealthy criminal, plans on assassinating the Police Commissioner, but his attack is foiled with his younger brother being killed by Ram Sinha, an unemployed individual. Dhonga goes to prison for five years and swears to avenge the humiliation and murder of his brother. Ram Sinha becomes an inspector, joining fellow inspector Kavi in imprisoning various drug dealers and pimps, including those who work for Dhonga. While Ram marries Kavi's sister Anjali and fathers a son, Dhonga returns from prison and plots to legally run his criminal empire with the help of some cops and his lawyer Srivastav, aiming to get the respect of the Police Commissioner. Dhonga's other brother Satpal hatches a plot to murder Anjali, and plants heroin and cocaine in his house, so that Ram gets arrested. Ram escapes his arrest with the help of Ritu, proves his innocence to the Commissioner, and kills all his enemies while rescuing his son and Kavi, who both were kidnapped by Dhonga.

== Cast ==
- Jackie Shroff as Inspector Ram Sinha
- Aditya Pancholi as Inspector Kavi
- Manisha Koirala as Anjali Sinha
- Deepti Bhatnagar as Nitu Sinha
- Anupam Kher as Dhonga
- Mukesh Rishi as Satpal Dhonga
- Johnny Lever as Raja
- Alok Nath as Lawyer Ram Srivastava
- Dinesh Anand as Salim Langda (Drug Dealer)
- Bharat Kapoor as Lawyer Sunil Saxena
- Sudhir as Inspector Azhgar Ali
- Tiku Talsania as Havaldar
- Ishrat Ali as Inspector Shinde
- Dara Singh as Police Commissioner Gujral

== Soundtrack ==
The music was composed by Anu Malik and released by Tips Music. The background score was composed by Aadesh Shrivastava.

Ram Shastra

Soundtrack album by Anu Malik
- Released: April 1995
- Recorded: 1995
- Genre: Soundtrack
- Length: 53:10
- Label: Tips Music
- Producer: Anu Malik

Anu Malik chronology
Yaraana (1995)	Ram Shastra (1995)	Namak (1996)

Track list
No.	Title	Lyrics	Singer(s)	Length
1.	"Tujhe Maanga Tha"	Rahat Indori	Vinod Rathod, Alka Yagnik	9:03
2.	"Tera Chehra Na Dekhun Agar"	Indeewar	Vinod Rathod, Alka Yagnik	7:46
3.	"Pyar Pyar Mujhe Pyar Ho Gaya"	Dev Kohli	Alka Yagnik	8:35
4.	"O Main Tera Tum Mere"	Dev Kohli	Kumar Sanu, Alka Yagnik	7:22
5.	"Chak Lange"	Maya Govind	Gurdas Mann, Sunita Rao	6:44
6.	"Love Machine"	Dev Kohli	Usha Uthup	5:54
7.	"Tera Chehra Na Dekhun Agar (Female) ft. Deepti Bhatnagar"	Indeewar	Alka Yagnik	7:46
Total length:				53:10
