= Juaari =

- Directed by: Jagdish Sharma
- Written by: Naeem - Ejaz (Dialogues)
- Screenplay by: S. Khan
- Story by: S. Khan
- Produced by: Vijay Sharma
- Starring: Dharmendra; Armaan Kohli; Shilpa Shirodkar; Mehmood; Kiran Kumar; Raza Murad; Paresh Rawal
- Music by: Bappi Lahiri
- Release date: 8 July 1994 (India)
- Running time: 184 min
- Language: Hindi

Juaari is a 1994 Bollywood Crime drama film starring Armaan Kohli, Dharmendra and Shilpa Shirodkar. The film was released on 7 July 1994. It didn't do well at the box office and was declared as flop.

== Plot ==
Police Inspector Dharam Singh (Dharmendra) gets involved in a suicide case which involves gambling at Mumbai Club run by Sanga aka Mr. Sangram. When Dharam Singh tries to arrest Mumbai Club employees, they get killed by Sanga & Dharam Singh gets blamed for murdering Mumbai club employees for which Dharam Singh gets suspended from Police Force. Anita's father losses her to Sanga in gambling for which Anita's lover Vijay (Armaan Kohli) goes to Sanga & asks to free Anita. Sanga tells Vijay that he will free her if Vijay arranges 10 lakhs rupees within 3 months if he wants Neeta at any cost. Vijay tries his luck by getting job but instead, he gets beaten by hooligans. Later, Vijay tries his Luck through Salim (Johnny Lever) through Street Gambling & manages to earn money to get Neeta back but instead, Vijay gets jailed. After a while, when Vijay comes out from prison, he gets informed by Salim that Sanga has enslaved Neeta at her Den. To get her back at any cost, Vijay & Salim go to Sanga's club for gambling but in a fight, Sanga's son Vicky gets killed accidentally for which Vijay goes on the run from Sanga. When Sanga hears this, he causes chaos in the city which makes city police have no other choice but to recruit suspended police officer Dharam Singh to stop Sanga & his chaos. On his way to stop Sanga, Dharam Singh joins forces with Vijay & they save Anita from Sanga & his henchmans by killing Sanga & his den.

== Cast ==
- Dharmendra as Dharam Singh aka Inspector Hathoda Singh
- Armaan Kohli as Vijay
- Shilpa Shirodkar as Anita
- Paresh Rawal as Inspector Godbole
- Raza Murad as Inspector Waghmare
- Kiran Kumar as Sangram Singh (Sanga)
- Mehmood as Uncle Mahesh
- Johnny Lever as Salim Tension
- Vikas Anand as Minister Mohan Saxena
- K. K. Raj as Henchman of Sanga
- Amrit Patel as Satnam
- Ali Khan as Ajay

== Soundtrack ==
All songs are written by Anwar Sagar.

No.	Title	Singer(s)
1	"Parbat Roke Sagar Roke"	Anupama Deshpande, Amit Kumar
2	"Chhupaa Le Aankhon Men Banaa Ke Kaajal"	Kumar Sanu, Sadhana Sargam
3	"Gali Gali Mein Pani Hai"	Vinod Rathod, Kavita Krishnamurthy, Bappi Lahiri
4	"Haara Khiladi Jeet Gaye Hum" (not in the film)	Sudesh Bhosle, Kavita Krishnamurthy, Abhijeet
5	"Qaid Mein Hai Bulbul"	Kavita Krishnamurthy
6	"Tum Hi Tum Ho" (not in the film)	Abhijeet, Sadhana Sargam
