= Dharma Chakkaram =

- Theatrical release poster
- Directed by: K. S. Ravikumar
- Screenplay by: K. S. Ravikumar
- Story by: A. Hari Krishnan
- Produced by: K. Muralidharan; V. Swaminathan; G. Venugopal
- Starring: Vijayakanth; Rambha; Deepti Bhatnagar
- Cinematography: Raja Rajan
- Edited by: K. Thanikachalam
- Music by: Deva
- Production company: Lakshmi Movie Makers
- Release date: 14 January 1997
- Running time: 150 minutes
- Country: India
- Language: Tamil

Dharma Chakkaram (transl. Wheel of Righteousness) is a 1997 Indian Tamil-language action drama film directed by K. S. Ravikumar and produced by Lakshmi Movie Makers. The film stars Vijayakanth, Rambha and Deepti Bhatnagar. It was released on 14 January 1997.

== Plot ==
Chakkaravarthy is a village chief who tries to solve villagers' problems. His past is marked by Vijayalakshmi whom he was supposed to marry. Arumugam, a jealous enemy of Chakkaravarthy, challenges him. Chakkaravarthy accepts it as long as he gives him something. Arumugam puts on a fight competition and would only surrender Vijayalakshmi to him in marriage, if he loses. Confident, she orders to win against Arumugam. But Chakkaravarthy loses and Vijayalakshmi sacrifices her life after marrying Arumugam.

Entering the village Vijayalakshmi who has the same name as the older one. Vijayalakshmi is rebellious and defended by Chakkaravarthy when confronted by the villagers. When she is tortured by Arumugam's goons, Chakkaravarthy comes to her rescue.

== Cast ==
- Vijayakanth as Chakkaravarthy
- Rambha as Vijayalakshmi
- Deepti Bhatnagar as Vijayalakshmi, Chakkaravarthy's former fiancée
- Manivannan as Vellasamy
- Senthil as Palani
- R. Sundarrajan as Accountant
- B. H. Tharun Kumar as Arumugam
- Ponnambalam as K. Singamuthu
- C. R. Vijayakumari as Vijayalakshmi's adoptive mother
- Pandu as Chakkaravarthy's servant
- Vani as Vellasamy's wife
- Jyothi Lakshmi as Amsa Valli
- Delhi Ganesh as Vijayalakshmi's father, Chakkaravarthy's relative
- K. R. Vatsala as Kannukku Pillai's wife
- Ramesh Khanna as himself
- Crane Manohar as Broker
- K. S. Ravikumar in a cameo appearance
- Robo Shankar (uncredited)

== Production ==
Meena was the first choice for Rambha's role. Suvaluxmi and Laila had turned down the lead female role before Deepti Bhatnagar was selected.

== Soundtrack ==
The music was composed by Deva, with lyrics by R. V. Udayakumar.

Song	Singer(s)	Duration
"Mamara Anilo"	Sujatha	5.27
"Putta Putta"	K. S. Chithra, Deva, Krishnaraj	4.28
"Sollaikulla Kaatukulla"	S. P. Balasubrahmanyam, Sujatha	5.29
"Oorukulla"	Krishnaraj	5.29
"Pettakozhi"	S. P. Balasubrahmanyam	4.42

== Release ==
Dharma Chakkaram was released on Pongal 1997 alongside Minsara Kanavu, Periya Thambi, Iruvar and Bharathi Kannamma. According to Indolink, the film "fared pretty well". Rocky Rajesh won the Cinema Express Award for Best Stunt Director.

== Legacy ==
Following Vijayakanth's death in 2023, Film Companion included the film in their list "7 Vijayakanth Films That Left an Indian Cinema Legacy".
