= Crakk =

2024 Indian film by Aditya Datt

Crakk: Jeetegaa...Toh Jiyegaa
- Theatrical release poster
- Directed by: Aditya Datt
- Written by: Aditya Datt; Rehan Khan; Sarim Momin; Mohinder Pratab Singh
- Produced by: Vidyut Jammwal; Abbas Sayyed
- Starring: Vidyut Jammwal; Arjun Rampal; Nora Fatehi; Amy Jackson; Rukmini Maitra; Pooja Sawant; Ankit Mohan; Jamie Lever
- Cinematography: Mark Hamilton
- Edited by: Sandeep Kurup
- Music by: Score: Vikram Montrose; Songs: Mithoon; MC Square; Tanishk Bagchi; Vikram Montrose
- Production company: Action Hero Films
- Distributed by: Panorama Studios
- Release date: 23 February 2024
- Running time: 154 minutes
- Country: India
- Language: Hindi
- Budget: ₹45 crore
- Box office: ₹17.08 crore

Crakk (marketed as Crakk: Jeetegaa...Toh Jiyegaa) is a 2024 Indian Hindi-language sports action film directed by Aditya Datt and produced by Vidyut Jammwal and Abbas Sayyed under Action Hero Films. It stars Jammwal, Arjun Rampal, Nora Fatehi, Amy Jackson, Jamie Lever, Pooja Sawant, Ankit Mohan, and Rukmini Maitra. It was billed as the first-ever extreme sports action film in India.

The film was officially announced on 20 October 2022, and principal photography took place between October 2022 to December 2023 in Poland.

Crakk was released on 23 February 2024 to mixed-to-negative reviews from critics. It eventually became box office bomb, earning only ₹17.08 crore against budget of ₹45 crore.

== Premise ==
Siddharth "Siddhu" Dixit, a slum dweller in Mumbai, enters Maidaan, an underground survival sports competition headed by Dev, to unravel the truth about his missing brother Nihal Dixit.

== Cast ==
- Vidyut Jammwal as Siddharth "Siddhu" Dixit
- Arjun Rampal as Dev
- Nora Fatehi as Alia
- Amy Jackson as Patricia Novak
- Rajendra Sisatkar as Siddhu's father
- Shalaka Pawar as Siddhu's mother
- Ankit Mohan as Nihal Dixit, Siddhu's brother
- Bijay Anand as Mark, Dev's adopted father
- Jamie Lever as Junaida
- Michael Owusu as Zack
- Kailash Pal as Baloon Man
- Pooja Sawant
- Rukmini Maitra

== Production ==
=== Development ===
The film was announced on 20 October 2022 with Vidyut Jammwal, Jacqueline Fernandez and Arjun Rampal in the lead roles, to be directed by Aditya Datt. Fernandez was later replaced by Nora Fatehi due to creative differences.

=== Filming ===
Under his production banner Action Hero Films, Jammwal collaborated with Datt on the film, which marked their second venture after Commando 3. The shooting was wrapped up on 18 December 2023.

== Music ==
Crakk

Soundtrack album by Tanishk Bagchi, MC Square, Vikram Montrose and Mithoon
- Released: 20 February 2024
- Recorded: 2022
- Genre: Feature film soundtrack
- Length: 19:43
- Language: Hindi
- Label: T-Series
External audio
- Audio Jukebox on YouTube

The music of the film was composed by Tanishk Bagchi, MC Square, Vikram Montrose and Mithoon while lyrics are written by Gurpreet Saini, Tanishk Bagchi, Shekhar Astitwa, Paradox, Mithoon, Abhinav Shekhar and Vikram Montrose.

The first song titled "Dil Jhoom" was a remake of the titular song from 2011 album Jhoom by Pakistani singer Ali Zafar.

Track listing
| No. | Title | Lyrics | Music | Singer(s) | Length |
|---|---|---|---|---|---|
| 1. | "Dil Jhoom" | Gurpreet Saini | Tanishk Bagchi | Vishal Mishra, Shreya Ghoshal | 3:07 |
| 2. | "Rom Rom" | MC Square | MC Square, Tanishk Bagchi | MC Square | 3:26 |
| 3. | "Jeena Haraam" | Tanishk Bagchi | Tanishk Bagchi | Vishal Mishra, Shilpa Rao | 2:35 |
| 4. | "Crakk - Title Track" | Shekhar Astitwa, Paradox | Vikram Montrose | Vikram Montrose, Paradox | 2:53 |
| 5. | "Khayal Rakhna" | Manoj Muntashir | Mithoon | Mithoon | 5:18 |
| 6. | "Khel" | Abhinav Shekhar, Vikram Montrose | Vikram Montrose | Abhinav Shekhar, Vikram Montrose | 2:24 |
| Total length: | | | | | 19:43 |

== Release ==
Crakk was released on 23 February 2024. Owing to the negative response, the makers changed the climax for the film's digital release by removing 15 minutes of footage.

== Reception ==
Crakk received mixed-to-negative reviews from critics. On the review aggregator website Rotten Tomatoes, 14% of 7 critics' reviews are positive, with an average rating of 4/10.

Dhaval Roy of The Times of India gave 2.5/5 stars and wrote "Crakk: Jeetegaa Toh Jiyegaa delivers on the thrilling action front, offering a refreshing glimpse into the world of extreme sports on the big screen. However, its reliance on predictable tropes and a somewhat underwhelming storyline might leave you wanting more". Ganesh Aaglave of Firstpost gave 2.5/5 stars and wrote "Crakk is high on action and stunts but lacks the thrill and several times tests your patience".

Bollywood Hungama gave 2/5 stars and praised its action sequences, concept and technical aspects, but criticized its script and runtime. Rishil Jogani of Pinkvilla gave 2/5 stars and wrote "Despite being a breakthrough in terms of action in films in India, Crakk ends up as an irredeemable film".

Sonil Dedhia of News18 gave 1/5 stars and wrote "Vidyut Jammwal and Arjun Rampal’s action entertainer is a cheap and dumb down version of Squid Game". Mayur Sanap of Rediff gave 1/5 stars and wrote "With no redeeming qualities whatsoever, Crakk is absolute crap!".

Monika Rawal Kukreja of Hindustan Times wrote "Crakk isn't just calling all adrenaline junkies to enjoy the kick, but it wishes to cater to that particular niche who has a penchant for these extreme sports and action". Rahul Desai of Film Companion wrote "Crakk is needlessly convoluted, long and self-sabotaging".
