= Street of Dreams (1988 film) =

- DVD cover
- Genre: Action; Thriller
- Based on: Good Night and Good-Bye; Kyd for Hire by Timothy Harris
- Teleplay by: Bill Stratton
- Directed by: William A. Graham
- Starring: Ben Masters; Morgan Fairchild; Diane Salinger; Alan Autry; Michael Cavanaugh
- Music by: Laurence Rosenthal
- Country of origin: United States
- Original language: English

Production
- Executive producer: Gerald W. Abrams
- Producer: Richard Ravin
- Production location: London
- Cinematography: Dennis Lewiston
- Editor: Ronald J. Fagan
- Running time: 94 minutes
- Production company: Phoenix Entertainment Group

Original release
- Network: CBS
- Release: October 7, 1988

Street of Dreams is a 1988 American action/thriller film directed by William A. Graham and starring Ben Masters and Morgan Fairchild. Made as a television film, Street of Dreams was originally aired on October 7, 1988, on CBS and was subsequently released on DVD on January 10, 2005. The role of a drug addict who—per Fairchild's remarks—"looks like hell" marked a departure for Morgan Fairchild, whose career had, up to that point, been defined by roles of glamour and sex appeal.

The film follows a laid-back private investigator Kyd Thomas (Ben Masters) who gets thrust into Hollywood's world of crime after he meets Laura Cassidy (Morgan Fairchild). Laura is a cocaine addict who Kyd saves from being beaten and raped and with whom he quickly enters a romantic relationship. The storyline is based on the books Good Night and Good-Bye and Kyd for Hire by American author Timothy Harris which chronicle stories of the life and adventures of a private investigator named Thomas Kyd. Harris has since claimed that he was credited on the film even though he "didn't really do anything on it", "didn't write it, and wasn't involved."

== Morgan Fairchild's role ==
Morgan Fairchild, known for her glamorous roles and often herself referred to as "glamorous" and a "sex symbol", took on the role of cocaine addict Laura because she "liked the chance to play somebody who looks like hell." Fairchild has stated in interviews that the role was "a real challenge" and that, even though she found it "humiliating" and "scary" to have circles drawn under her eyes for more realistic effect, she still considered it to be "a lot of fun to be working on something a little off the beaten track." Fairchild stated that she would love to get more acting jobs that are antithetical to her image, such as "a bag lady or a scrub woman" but fears that filmmakers will not think to consider her for such a role.

== Cast ==
- Ben Masters - Kyd Thomas
- Morgan Fairchild - Laura Cassidy / Eva Bomberg
- Diane Salinger - Anne Kepler
- Michael Cavanaugh - Lt. Marcus
- Alan Autry - Maury Fields
- Gerald Hiken - Dix Landau
- Wendell Wellman - Carl Bomberg
- John Hillerman - Raymond Kepler

== See also ==
- Cinema of the United States
- 1988 in film
- List of American films of 1988
