= Jamie Lever =

Indian actress and comedian (born 1987)

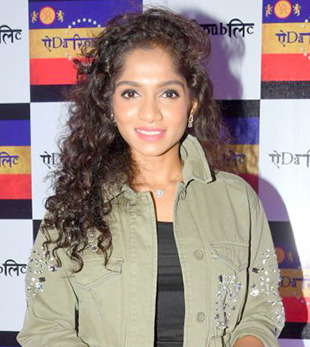
- Lever in 2017
- Born: 19 October 1987 (age 38); Mumbai, Maharashtra, India
- Education: University of Westminster
- Occupations: Actress; comedian
- Years active: 2010–present
- Known for: Kis Kisko Pyaar Karoon; Comedy Circus Ke Mahabali
- Father: Johnny Lever
- Relatives: Jimmy Moses (paternal uncle); Jesse Lever (brother)

Jamie Lever (born 19 October 1987) is an Indian actress and comedian who works in Hindi films and television. She is the daughter of comedian and actor Johnny Lever.

== Early life and education ==
Lever is the daughter of the comedian Johnny Lever (John Prakash Rao Janumala) and Sujata Janumala. She has a younger brother, Jesse. Lever received her Master of Marketing Communications degree from University of Westminster, London.

== Career ==
Lever began her career in August 2012 as a marketing executive at the London-based market research agency Visiongain. She has performed at The Comedy Store, Mumbai from 2012 as a stand-up comedian. She performed on Comedy Circus Ke Mahabali on Sony Entertainment Television in 2013. Lever has also hosted various shows.

== Filmography ==
Key
†	Denotes films that have not yet been released

=== Films ===
Year	Title	Role	Language	Notes
2015	Kis Kisko Pyaar Karoon	Champa	Hindi	Debut film
2019	Housefull 4	Giggly	Hindi	
2021	Bhoot Police	Lata	Hindi	Disney Plus Hotstar film
2023	Yaatris	Meenu	Hindi	
2024	Crakk	Junaida	Hindi	
2024	Aa Okkati Adakku	Devi	Telugu	Debut in Telugu cinema
2025	Kis Kisko Pyaar Karoon 2	Santosh	Hindi	

=== Web series ===
Year	Title	Role	Notes
2023	Pop Kaun?	Rani	Disney+ Hotstar
2026	Matka King	Sulbha	Prime Video

=== Music videos ===
Year	Title	Singer	Label	Ref.
2021	Kinni Kinni Vaari	Raashi Sood	BGBNG Music	
