= Anaam =

- Directed by: Ramesh Modi
- Screenplay by: Ramesh Modi
- Story by: Ved Prakash Sharma
- Produced by: Vinod S. Choudhary
- Starring: Armaan Kohli; Ayesha Jhulka
- Cinematography: K.V. Ramanna
- Edited by: Sanjay Verma
- Music by: Nadeem-Shravan
- Release date: 3 November 1992 (India)
- Country: India
- Language: Hindi

Anaam is a 1992 Indian Hindi-language film directed by Ramesh Modi and produced by Vinod S. Choudhary. It stars Armaan Kohli and Ayesha Jhulka. It is based on the Hindi novel Vidhwa Ka Pati written by Ved Prakash Sharma.

== Cast ==
- Armaan Kohli... Sikandar H. Ali / Jony K. D'Souza / Aakash / Rocky / Prince
- Ayesha Jhulka... Meghna
- Kiran Kumar...Hyder Ali
- Sadashiv Amrapurkar... Inspector Angre
- Kulbhushan Kharbanda...D.K. Saxena
- Laxmikant Berde...Rajan 'Raju'
- Tej Sapru...Pasha
- Ajit Vachani... Inspector K.K. Diwan
- Anjana Mumtaz...Meghna's Mother
- Yunus Parvez...Liyaqat Ali Khan / Mohan Makhichand
- Mushtaq Khan... Inspector P.C. Yadav
- Reshma Singh...Janice J. D'Souza
- Arun Bakshi...Dr. Harry Thomas
- Subbiraj... Dr. Bhardwaj

== Soundtrack ==
The soundtrack was composed by Nadeem-Shravan. The lyrics were penned by Sameer.

No	Title	Singer(s)
1.	"Churi Bole Paayal Bole"	Kumar Sanu, Alka Yagnik
2.	"Aaye Barati"	Kumar Sanu
3.	"Aaye Barati" - Sad	Abhijeet
4.	"O Jaane Jaana"(Part-I)	Abhijeet, Sarika Kapoor
5.	"O Jaane Jaana" (Part-II)	Abhijeet, Sarika Kapoor
6.	"O Jaane Jaana" (Part-III)	Abhijeet
7.	"O Jaane Jaana" (Part-IV Sad)	Abhijeet
8.	"Mein Kaun Mein Kya Hoon"	Kumar Sanu
9.	"Hum Nashee Dilruba"	Kumar Sanu, Sadhna Sargam
10.	"Mein Hoon Ek Shama"	Kavita Krishnamurthy
