= Joru Ka Ghulam =

2000 Indian film by Shakeel Noorani

- Theatrical release poster
- Directed by: Shakeel Noorani
- Written by: Ikram Akhtar
- Produced by: Shakeel Noorani
- Starring: Govinda; Twinkle Khanna; Kader Khan; Johnny Lever; Ali Asgar
- Cinematography: Dinesh Telkar
- Music by: Aadesh Shrivastava
- Release date: 16 June 2000
- Country: India
- Language: Hindi
- Budget: est. ₹5.5 crore
- Box office: est. ₹13.10 crore

Joru Ka Ghulam (lit. 'Wife's Slave') is a 2000 Indian Hindi-language comedy film. The film is directed by Shakeel Noorani and stars Govinda, Twinkle Khanna, Kader Khan and Johnny Lever. The music is by Aadesh Shrivastava. The film was released on 16 June 2000.

== Plot ==
Wealthy Dyaneshwarprasad Pitamber has a problem, to be precise four problems - his four uncontrollable daughters, named after four goddesses: Lakshmi, Saraswati, Parvati, and Durga, who refuse to be disciplined, and be married. Pitamber arranges for Raju Patel to come from the U.S. and marry at least one of his daughters. Unfortunately, Raju is waylaid at the airport by two con men, Raja and Kanhaiya, and his luggage, clothes, and ID are taken over by them, and he is left in barely basic clothing at the airport, mistaken for a beggar. Raja assumes the identity of Raju, and Kanhaiya accompanies him to Pitamber's house. Once there, they are welcomed with open arms by Pitamber, and Raja agrees to all conditions set up by Pitamber and his daughters in order to get married and inherent part of the vast wealth and fortune. Sensing something wrong somewhere, Pitamber asks Raja to locate three other grooms for his three daughters also, otherwise, no marriage will take place, as he wants all four daughters to be married at the same time. With all four refusing to marry anyone, it looks like Raja and Kanhaiya have a lot on their hands, apart from hiding from notorious criminal Pappu Anna, who has sworn to kill them for making him suffer a huge financial loss.

Raja then somehow help Parvati get back his love Ravi and after knowing the past of Saraswati that in college days, a gangster's brother flirts and tries to rape her and no men helped her to get him(gangster's brother) punished. Raja then went to him with Kanhaiya and later he(gangster's brother) apologize to Saraswati and she get impressed to Kanhaiya. Raja have an idea to get Lakshmi married and get 10 crore(5 crore from raja's marriage and another 5 crore from Kanhaiya's). He calls the original Raju Patel and convinced him to marry Lakshmi.

In the end, Pitembar finds out that raja is a fraud but forgives her and all the 4 grooms and brides got married.

== Cast ==
- Govinda as Raja / Raju Patel (Fake)
- Twinkle Khanna as Durga Pitamber
- Kader Khan as Dhaneshwarprasad Pitamber
- Johnny Lever as Kanhaiya
- Ashok Saraf as P. K. Girpade, Raja's Mama
- Ali Asgar as Raju Patel
- Ashish Vidyarthi as Pappu Anna
- Razzak Khan as Fida Hussain (Pitambar's Secretary)
- Ghanshyam Rohera as Warden at Mental Hospital
- Rakhi Sawant as Chandni, Pinjara Bar Dancer
- Rajshree Solanki as Lakshmi Pitamber (Durga's sister #1)
- Sonu Sagar as Saraswati Pitamber (Durga's sister #2)
- Rushika Reikhi as Parvati Pitamber (Durga's sister #3)

== Soundtrack ==
The songs for the film were composed by Aadesh Shrivastava.

#	Song	Singers	Length
1.	"Joru Ka Ghulam"	Abhijeet, Sunidhi Chauhan	04:34
2.	"Neeche Phoolon Ki Dukan"	Sonu Nigam, Aadesh Shrivastava	04:23
3.	"Khula Hai Mera Pinjra"	Kumar Sanu, Alka Yagnik	05:05
4.	"Meri Nazar"	Jaspinder Narula, Rajesh Mishra	04:54
5.	"Tumhare Bina Kuch"	Sonu Nigam, Hema Sardesai	06:21
6.	"Woh Aayee"	Alka Yagnik, Sonu Nigam	06:32

In his review for Rediff.com, Syed Firdaus Ashraf opined that Srivastava's music was the "good and different" in the film. All songs were good especially "Neeche Phoolon Ki Dukan" was chart-baster .

== Reception ==
Syed Firdaus Ashraf of Rediff.com praised the performances of Govinda and Johnny Lever and called Khanna "passable", while noting that Razzak Khan's role was a "pleasant change from his earlier roles" and his character was hilarious. Taran Adarsh of Bollywood Hungama wrote that the film belonged to Govinda and in one of her "better performances", Khanna looked "ravishing" and portrayed her emotions "very well".
