= Be Careful =

Be Careful may refer to:

- Be Careful (album) by DeStorm Power
- Be Careful (film), 2011 Bollywood film
- "Be Careful" (Sparkle song) by Sparkle
- "Be Careful" (Cardi B song), by Cardi B
- "Be Careful", by Jason Derulo from Future History
- "Bachke Rehna Re Baba" (lit. 'Be Careful'), a song by R. D. Burman, Asha Bhosle and Kishore Kumar from the 1983 Indian film Pukar
- Bachke Rehna Re Baba (lit. 'Be Careful'), a 2005 Indian Hindi-language film

== See also ==
- Be Careful What You Wish For (disambiguation)
