= Raaj Tilak =

- Promotional Poster
- Directed by: Rajkumar Kohli
- Written by: Inder Raj Anand
- Produced by: Anil Suri
- Starring: Sunil Dutt; Dharmendra; Raaj Kumar; Kamal Haasan; Pran; Hema Malini; Reena Roy; Ranjeeta; Yogeeta Bali
- Music by: Kalyanji-Anandji
- Production company: A. R. Productions
- Release date: 31 August 1984
- Running time: 180 minutes
- Country: India
- Language: Hindi

Raaj Tilak (transl. Coronation) is a 1984 Indian Hindi-language action drama film directed by Rajkumar Kohli. The film features an ensemble cast of Sunil Dutt, Dharmendra, Raaj Kumar, Kamal Haasan, Pran, Hema Malini, Reena Roy, Ranjeeta and Yogeeta Bali. The music was composed by Kalyanji-Anandji

Raaj Tilak was released on 31 August 1984.

== Plot ==
The local King has many enemies including his own trusted men, Bhavani Singh and Ranjeet. But the King always has the help of Samadh Khan, and the King's brother-in-law, Arjun Singh. Now the King's newborn son is abducted by Jalal Khan and Samadh Khan is branded a traitor. Jalal turns the prince to a local gypsy band. The queen is devastated over the disappearance of her son, but Arjun offers his son for her, but Bhavani finds out this move and switches his son with Arjun's son. Years later, now the Prince, Shamsher Singh is like Bhavani and has all bad habits. He soon imprisons his very own mother and inflicts all kinds of atrocities on common people. Arjun attempts to intervene but is imprisoned. The climax shows thstbthe real prince surface for the revenge.

== Cast ==
- Sunil Dutt as Jai Singh
- Raaj Kumar as Samadh Khan
- Dharmendra as Zorawar Singh
- Hema Malini as Roopa Singh
- Reena Roy as Madhumati Singh
- Kamal Haasan as Suraj Singh
- Raj Kiran as Shamsher Singh
- Yogeeta Bali as Nazma Khan
- Ranjeeta Kaur as Sapna
- Sarika
- Pran as Arjun Singh
- Jamuna as Rajmata
- Raza Murad as Jalal Khan
- Madan Puri as Ranjeet Singh
- Ajit as Bhavani Singh
- Om Prakash as Sardar Zuberi

== Soundtrack ==
Raaj Tilak

Soundtrack album by Kalyanji-Anandji Verma Malik (lyrics)
- Released: 1984
- Genre: Feature film soundtrack
- Language: Hindi
- Label: The Oriental Gramophone Record Co.

#	Song	Singer
1	"Julm Ho Gaya Re"	Kishore Kumar, Alka Yagnik, Sadhana Sargam
2	"Aa Gaye, Aa Gaye"	Kishore Kumar, Alka Yagnik, Sadhana Sargam, Anuradha Paudwal
3	"Devta Re, Devta Re"	Asha Bhosle
4	"Ajooba Ajooba"	Asha Bhosle, Suresh Wadkar
5	"Ek Lafz-E-Mohabbat"	Asha Bhosle, Shabbir Kumar
