= Jaani Dushman: Ek Anokhi Kahani =

2002 Indian film by Rajkumar Kohli

Jaani Dushman : Ek Anokhi Kahaani
- Theatrical release poster
- Directed by: Rajkumar Kohli
- Screenplay by: Rajkumar Kohli; Naveena Bhandari
- Dialogues by: K. K. Singh
- Story by: Rajinder Singh Aatish
- Produced by: Rajkumar Kohli
- Starring: Armaan Kohli; Manisha Koirala; Sunny Deol; Akshay Kumar; Suniel Shetty; Arshad Warsi; Sonu Nigam; Aftab Shivdasani; Aditya Pancholi; Sharad Kapoor; Rambha; Pinky Campbell; Kiran Rathod
- Cinematography: Thomas A. Xavier; Damodar Naidu
- Edited by: Kuku Cuckoo; Dilip Darak
- Music by: Songs: Anand–Milind; Anand Raj Anand; Score: Sandeep Chowta
- Production company: Shankar Movies
- Distributed by: Shankar Movies
- Release date: 16 August 2002
- Running time: 171 minutes
- Country: India
- Language: Hindi
- Budget: ₹ 18 crore
- Box office: ₹ 18.56 crore

Jaani Dushman: Ek Anokhi Kahaani (transl. Sworn Enemy: A Unique Story) is a 2002 Indian Hindi-language fantasy action thriller film directed and produced by Rajkumar Kohli, making it his last film as a director. The film stars Armaan Kohli and Manisha Koirala, along with an ensemble cast including Sunny Deol, Akshay Kumar, Suniel Shetty, Arshad Warsi, Sonu Nigam, Aftab Shivdasani, Aditya Pancholi, Rambha and Sharad Kapoor.

The film was Armaan Kohli's comeback film where he was reintroduced with a new name Munish Kohli. Before its release, the film generated considerable hype for its innovative special effects, uncommon in the industry at the time. It also marked the first film featuring both Akshay Kumar and Sunny Deol, two major action stars of the previous decade, though they had no scenes together.

Upon its release, the film received overwhelmingly negative reviews and was a box office failure. Critics cited a poorly executed story, illogical scenes, and miscasting, notably the use of older actors as college students. Several scenes were plagiarised from Hollywood films, including The Terminator and The Matrix. The film is widely regarded as one of the worst ever made in the Bollywood. Following its failure, director Rajkummar Kohli retired from filmmaking. The careers of actress Pinky Campbell and actor Siddharth Ray ended with this film and also his last film in his lifetime before he died on 8 March 2004.

== Plot ==
Divya and Karan Saxena are in love and engaged. Karan has a younger step-brother, Vivek, whom he looks after as if he was his brother. Divya and Vivek study in the same college as their friends group. The group includes Atul, Vijay, Divya, Abdul, Vivek, Ashok Kejriwal, Prem Srivastav, Victor, Rajesh and Madan.

Rajesh and Madan attempt to molest Divya. They are stopped and beaten up by Karan, who takes them to the college's principal, Professor Joseph. He agrees to let the incident go if Divya forgives them, which she later does. However, Rajesh and Madan decide to avenge their humiliation. Soon after, Karan goes to London for work. Under the pretext of inviting Divya to Atul's party, Rajesh imitates the voices of all the guys in the group and tricks her into coming to an abandoned fort earlier than the scheduled time for the party. Divya arrives, where she is brutally raped by Rajesh and Madan, prompting her to kill herself. Divya's friends arrive, and before dying she curses them, thinking that they all were involved in the rape.

Unknown to Divya, in her past life, she was a snake-woman Vasundhara and her partner was a snake-man named Kapil, who had magical powers. Their happy life was shattered by an angry sage who cursed them with separation until the 21st century. Kapil had to undergo penance until the 21st century when Vasundhara will be reborn. He also gained supernatural strength, near-immortality, and the power to impersonate anything as a result of his penance. The sage warned him that he could be defeated or killed by one supernaturally powerful mortal being. Though Divya has just died, her spirit has survived. Kapil gets very angry to learn of her death and promises to get his revenge on everyone in the group. Divya’s spirit joins Kapil to avenge her humiliation and death, not against the two guilty members, but against all the male members in group.

As a result, Madan is killed the same night by Kapil. Divya is meanwhile reduced to a soul, who could enter human bodies and control them as per her wish. Rajesh gets married and his friends arrive at the party. On that night, she enters the body of his bride and kills him.

Kapil and Divya decide to kill everyone (everyone whose voice Rajesh had imitated) who coerced her to go to the fort. Kapil impersonates a driver who gives a lift to Victor when his car broke down. After isolating him, Kapil runs over Victor with a motorbike. He goes to the party in Lonavala impersonating Victor and kills Abdul by electrocuting him.

Atul and his friends, with the help of their Principal Joseph, a professor of parapsychology, summon Divya's ghost. They try to reason with Divya, explaining that they had never called her to the fort after she initially declined. However, she refuses to believe their innocence. The principal gives the group necklaces with higher powers and assures them that they cannot be harmed by supernatural forces when they are wearing the necklace. Atul, an atheist, doesn't believe this. However, when he is attacked by Kapil, he realizes he survived because the necklace was stuck in his hand. Later, Kapil impersonates Nita and badly injures Atul but couldn't kill him. He ends up in a coma.

Divya then enters Prem's body and kills his nemesis, Ashok. Prem is immediately arrested but could be set free based on Rashmi's false statement, which she is willing to give because she was also in love with Prem. However, Kapil shapeshifts into Rashmi and accuses Prem of the murder in court. A distraught Prem is sentenced to be hanged to death by the court.

Preeti's father wants her to marry his friend's boxer son Raju instead of Vijay. Her father and Raju collude and decide that Raju will kill Vijay in a boxing match to remove him from the picture. Divya enters Raju's body and almost knocks out Vijay. But the principal notices this and uses his paraphernalia to block Divya's presence. Divya doesn't let Kapil interfere, and Vijay knocks out Raju. Divya stopped Kapil as she wants to be the one killing Vijay since he was the one who informed her of the time to arrive at the fort that night. She exacts her revenge by entering Vijay's body, which leads him to jump off the terrace and dies for accident.

Preeti informs Vivek of Vijay's death. The death of all his friends scares Vivek, who calls Karan to return to Mumbai to protect him. Before Karan could arrive home, Kapil impersonates their college principal and tells him to throw off the locket, he then tries to kill him but scares him off. Kapil then impersonates Karan and stabs Vivek, but couldn't kill him after noticing Karan's arrival. Kapil escapes and a confused Karan is arrested after Vivek accuses him of the stabbing. Atul comes out of a coma and escapes the hospital with Vivek, who also recovered at the same hospital. Atul is stabbed by Kapil while trying to save Vivek. Kapil then goes after Vivek. Atul, unable to destroy Kapil or save Vivek's life, goes to the principal and begs him to save Vivek's life. Atul then dies due to blood loss from his injuries.

Karan breaks out of the police lockup and shows up to stop Kapil from killing Vivek. Karan is badly wounded by Kapil. Principal Joseph resurrects Karan with outer-world powers by merging 3 major religions of the world, granting him supernatural powers like Kapil. Karan finally overpowers and kills Kapil. Vivek and Karan survive with Vivek being the only survivor among his best friends. Kapil and Vasundhara reunite in afterlife.

== Cast ==
- Sunny Deol as Karan Saxena
- Aditya Pancholi as Ashok Kejriwal
- Akshay Kumar as Atul
- Suniel Shetty as Vijay
- Manisha Koirala as Divya / Vasundhara, the snakewoman
- Arshad Warsi as Abdul
- Armaan Kohli as Kapil the kala Nagman
- Aftab Shivdasani as Bandu Tathawade
- Rambha as Nita, Atul's girlfriend.
- Sharad Kapoor as Victor
- Sonu Nigam as Vivek Saxena "Vicky", Karan's younger brother.
- Kiran Rathod as Rashmi Sharma
- Siddharth Ray as Madan
- Rajat Bedi as Rajesh
- Raj Babbar as Veshi Principal
- Kiran Kumar as a Police Inspector
- Raza Murad as Priti's father (cameo appearance)
- Shahbaaz Khan as Raju (cameo appearance)
- Jaspal Bhatti as Raju's father (cameo appearance)
- Aman Verma as TV show host (cameo appearance)
- Shamsuddin as Javed in the song Javed Bhai So Re Le
- Upasana Singh as Niki
- Ali Khan as Doctor
- Pinky Campbell as Priti
- Gavin Packard as Referee
- Amrish Puri as Sadhu (special appearance)
- Atul Agnihotri as a man driving in a red car (cameo appearance)
- Dinesh Hingoo as a man in a car with his family (cameo appearance)
- Preeti Bhutani as Love interest of Victor
- Johnny Lever as Parwana (cameo)

== Music ==
The music for the film’s songs was composed by Anand–Milind and Anand Raj Anand. All songs composed by Anand–Milind had lyrics penned by Sameer, whereas the songs composed by Anand Raj Anand had lyrics penned by Dev Kohli. The background score of the film was done by Sandeep Chowta. The film’s music was released on Universal Music India. The soundtrack features eight songs.

Title	Singer(s)	Music director(s)	Lyricist(s)	Length	Picturized On
"Chal Kudiye"	Sonu Nigam, Jaspinder Narula	Anand–Milind	Sameer	04:51	Sunny Deol & Manisha Koirala
"Zindagi Mein Tujhpe"	Udit Narayan	Anand–Milind	Sameer	02:05	Featured in the film Manisha Koirala Chakkar
"Aaja Aaja"	Udit Narayan, Alka Yagnik	Anand–Milind	Sameer	07:02	Manisha Koirala & Armaan Kohli
"Ishq Sanam Ishq Khuda Ishq Bina Hai Kya"	Sonu Nigam, Alka Yagnik, Prashant Samaddar	Anand–Milind	Sameer	06:42	Aftab Shivdasani & Kiran Rathod
"Jaaneman Tu Khub Hai"	Sonu Nigam, Sunidhi Chauhan	Anand Raaj Anand	Dev Kohli	05:38	Akshay Kumar & Rambha
"Roop Salona Tera Dekh Ke"	Sonu Nigam, Poornima, Kavita Krishnamurty, Harry Anand, Pamela Jain, Atharvaa, Aziz Naza	Anand Raaj Anand	Dev Kohli	06:28	Akshay Kumar, Rambha, Atharvaa, Aditya Pancholi, Arshad Warsi, Kiran Rathod, Aftab Shivdasani, Sharad Kapoor, & Pinky Campbell
"Javed Bhai So Re Le"	Sonu Nigam	Sandeep Chowta	Nitin Raikwar	05:20	Atharvaa
"Zindagi Main Tujhpe"	Alka Yagnik	Anand–Milind	Sameer	02:00	Not featured in film

== Reception ==
=== Critical response ===
This film received highly negative reviews from critics. Ranjita Kulkarni of Rediff.com rated the film 1.5/10 saying, "The performances are half-hearted and the characters half-baked". He also called the film "unoriginal and disappointing". Bollywood Hungama rated the film 1.5/5, stating, "The film has a huge cast, but only Sunny Deol and Akshay Kumar leave an impact. Munish "Armaan" Kohli & others don't impress much".

=== Box office ===
The film opened well at the box office, collecting about ₹13.5 million on its first day. It collected ₹14 million on its second day and ₹12.7 million on its third day, taking its opening weekend collection to ₹40.2 million.

However, the negative critical reception led to a drastic fall in the box office collection. Its first-week collection closed at ₹64.7 million. Its collection continued declining, and finally ended up at a domestic net of ₹107.1 million, resulting in the film being declared a "Flop" by Box Office India.
