= Roopkumar Rathod =

Indian musician

Roop Kumar Rathod
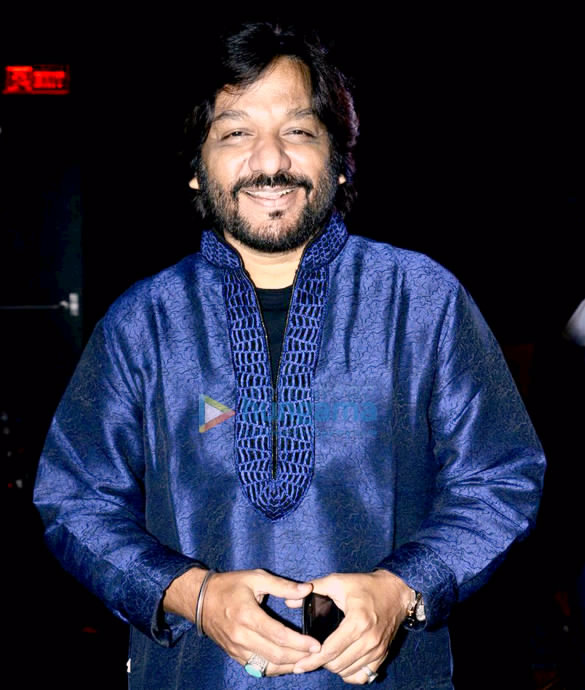
- Rathod in 2014

Background information
- Born: Mumbai, Maharashtra, India
- Genres: Indian pop; Ghazal
- Occupations: playback singer; music composer
- Spouse: Sunali Rathod

Roopkumar Rathod is an Indian playback singer, pop singer, and music composer. He has performed a number of songs in Hindi, Gujarati, Marathi, Tamil, Telugu, Bengali, Assamese, Odia, Nepali, Bhojpuri and Kannada films.

== Personal life ==
Rathod is the third and the youngest son of the late Pandit Chaturbhuj Rathod, a proponent of the oldest major vocal style associated with Hindustani classical music, Dhrupad. He belonged to the "Aditya Gharana of Jamnagar." He has two brothers, the late music composer Shravan Rathod, who was a part of the Nadeem-Shravan duo, and singer Vinod Rathod. Roopkumar is married to Sunali Rathod, formerly the first wife of bhajan singer, Anup Jalota. Together, they have a daughter named Reewa Rathod.

Roopkumar was introduced to music during his early years. He began playing the tabla and he became sought after by many ghazal singers in the 1980s. He first began playback singing in 1992 with the film Angaar.

== Career ==
Rathod has appeared as a vocalist on albums from 1999. He has sung songs in Gujarati, Hindi, Kannada, Marathi, Tamil, Telugu, Bengali, Oriya, Assamese, Nepali and Bhojpuri films.

The song "Sandese Aate Hai", from the movie Border, became one of the major breakthroughs of Rathod's career. He received his only Filmfare Award nomination to date at the 43rd Filmfare Awards. In addition, he sang the song "Tujh Mein Rab Dikhta Hai" for the movie Rab Ne Bana Di Jodi and 'Maula Mere Maula' for the movie Anwar.

Apart from playback singing for films, Roopkumar has long played live concerts across the world with his wife Sunali, performing a mix of ghazal, Sufi, light classical music, and film songs.

Roopkumar has also performed with the artists Trilok Gurtu, Ranjit Barot and Abhijit Pohankar in fusion concerts. He and Gurtu released the fusion album Beat of Love in December 2001 and the jazz album Broken Rhythms, in October 2004.

In August 2005, the comedy serial Sarabhai vs. Sarabhai featured Roopkumar and Sunali Rathod in one of their episodes that showcased a friendly musical contest.

Roopkumar, along with wife Sonali, won the title of 'Ustaad Jodi' on 'Mission Ustaad', a musical television reality show aired in February 2008, that aimed to create awareness about social causes. Donations were received by the United Nations Charities.

In 2011 he released a Sufi album along with his wife Sunali Rathod called "Kalma".

== Awards ==
Lokmat Sur Jyotsna National Music Award 2021 for his contribution to Indian music

He was awarded the "Icon" award at the Lokmat Sur Jyotsna National Music Awards.

== Filmography ==
=== As playback singer ===
Year	Film	Title	Composer	Notes
1992	Angaar	"Kitni Jaldi Yeh Mulaqat Guzar Jati"	Laxmikant–Pyarelal	Co-sung with Lata Mangeshkar
1993	Gumrah	"Main Tera Ashiq Hoon"	Laxmikant–Pyarelal	
1995	Raja	"Vada Jo Kiya"	Nadeem-Shravan	
1995	Naajayaz	"Barsaat Ke Mausam Mein"	Anu Malik	Co-sung with Kumar Sanu
1995	Gaddaar	"Beta Apni Maa Se"	Nadeem-Shravan	Co-sung with Udit Narayan and Sadhana Sargam
1996	Bhairavi	"Moh Maya"	Laxmikant–Pyarelal	
1997	Border	"Sandese Aate Hai"	Anu Malik	Co-sung with Sonu Nigam, lyrics by Javed Akhtar
1997	Border	"To Chalun"	Anu Malik	Lyrics by Javed Akhtar
1998	Kareeb	"Tuma Juda Ho Kar Hameen"	Anu Malik	Co-sung with Sanjeevani
1998	Hero Hindustani	"Aisi Waisi Baat Nahin"	Co-sung with Alka Yagnik and Ila Arun	
1999	Mother	"Pardesi To Hai Pardesi"	Dilip Sen-Sameer Sen	Co-sung with Anuradha Paudwal and Sonu Nigam
1999	Hum Saath-Saath Hain	"Sunoji Dulhan"	Raamlaxman	Co-sung with Kavita Krishnamurthy, Udit Narayan, Sonu Nigam and Pramita Rao
1999	Godmother	"Gunje Gangan Gunje Lalkaren Ham"	Vishal Bhardwaj	
1999	Hu Tu Tu	"Bandobast Hai, Jabardast Hai"	Vishal Bhardwaj	
1999	Laawaris	"Sine Mein Sulagata Hai Dil"	Rajesh Roshan	
1999	International Khiladi	"Kundi Kanwari"	Aadesh Shrivastava	
1999	Sarfarosh	"Zindagi Maut Na Ban Jaaye"	Jatin-Lalit	Co-sung with Sonu Nigam
1999	Dillagi	"Yeh Zameen Hai"	Jatin-Lalit	
1999	Thakshak	"Khamosh Raat"	A. R. Rahman	
1999	Hogi Pyaar Ki Jeet	"Tere Pyar Mein Main"	Anand–Milind	Co-sung with Jaspinder Narula
2000	Mela	"Mela Dilon Ka II" (Celebration)	Anu Malik	Co-sung with Sonu Nigam, Alka Yagnik, Shankar Mahadevan, Nitin Mukesh, Hema Sardesai, Jaspinder Narula and Anmol
2000	Krodh	"Sun Baba Sun"	Anand–Milind	Co-sung with Sapna Mukherjee
2000	Dil Pe Mat Le Yaar!!	"Chal Padi"	Vishal Bhardwaj	Co-sung with Suresh Wadkar
2001	Minnale	"Venmathiye"	Harris Jayaraj	Tamil film; co-sung with Tippu
2001	Censor	"Ho Aaj Majhab Koi"	Jatin–Lalit	Co-sung with Kavita Krishnamurthy, Vijayta Pandit and Vinod Rathod
2001	Rehnaa Hai Terre Dil Mein	"Dil Ko Tumse"	Harris Jayaraj	
2001	Rahul	"Vah Re Vah"	Anu Malik	
2001	Bas Itna Sa Khwaab Hai	"Jhoomen Yeh Zameen"	Aadesh Shrivastava	
2002	Kitne Door Kitne Paas	"Humko Mohabbat Dhoondh Rahi"	Sanjeev–Darshan	
2002	Filhaal	"Le Chale Doliyon Mein"	Anu Malik	Co-sung with K. S. Chithra
2002	Lal Salaam	"Zara Se Aao Na"	Hridaynath Mangeshkar, Uday Mazmudar	
2002	Gunaah	"Rooth Kar Hum"	Sajid–Wajid	
2003	Jism	"Shikayat Hai"	M.M. Keeravani	
2003	Baaz: A Bird in Danger	"Aaye Subah (Duet)"	Ismail Darbar	Co-sung with Sadhana Sargam
2003	Armaan	"Tum Hi Bata Zindagi (Male Version)"	Shankar–Ehsaan–Loy	
2003	LOC: Kargil	"Khush Rehna"	Anu Malik	Co-sung with Hari Om Sharan, Sudesh Bhonsle
2003	LOC: Kargil	"Main Kahin Bhi Rahoon"	Anu Malik	Co-sung with Sonu Nigam, Udit Narayan, Hariharan, Sukhwinder Singh
2004	Tum – A Dangerous Obsession	"Rehna To Hai"	Himesh Reshammiya	Co-sung with Alka Yagnik
2004	Lakshya	"Kandhon Se Milte Hain Kandhe"	Shankar–Ehsaan–Loy	Co sung with Sonu Nigam, Kunal Ganjawala, Vijay Prakash, Shankar Mahadevan and Hariharan
2004	Veer-Zaara	"Tere Liye"	Madan Mohan	Co-sung with Lata Mangeshkar
2004	Tumsa Nahin Dekha	"Yeh Dhuan Dhuan"	Nadeem–Shravan	Co-sung with Shreya Ghoshal
2004	Madhoshi	"Madhoshi"	Roop Kumar Rathod	
2005	Bhagmati	"Jiya Jaye Amma"	Vishal Bhardwaj	Co-sung with Asha Bhosle
2006	Shiva	"Kaise Kahein"	Ilaiyaraaja	Co-sung with Sandhana Sargam
2007	Pyar Kare Dis: Feel the Power of Love		Ghansham Vaswani	Sindhi film
2007	Anwar	"Maula Mere Maula"	Mithoon	
2007	Life in a... Metro	"In Dino (Reprise)"	Pritam	
2008	Sarkar Raj	"Jhini Jhini"	Bapi-Tutul	Co-sung with Shweta Pandit
2008	Drona	"Bandagi"	Dhruv Ghanekar	Co-sung with Sunidhi Chauhan
2008	Yuvvraaj	"Dil Ka Rishta"	A.R. Rahman	Co-sung with Sonu Nigam
2008	Rab Ne Bana Di Jodi	"Tujhe Mein Rab Dikhta Hai"	Salim–Sulaiman	
2009	Vaamanan	"Oru Devathai"	Yuvan Shankar Raja	Tamil film
2009	London Dreams	"Barso Yaaron"	Shankar–Ehsaan–Loy	Co-sung with Vishal Dadlani
2009	London Dreams	"Yaari Bina"	Shankar–Ehsaan–Loy	Co-sung with Millind Diwadkar
2010	Veer	"Salaam Aaya"	Sajid–Wajid	Co-sung with Shreya Ghoshal
2010	Toonpur Ka Superhero	"Jeetoge Tum"	Anu Malik	Co-sung with Javed Ali
2010	Madrasapattinam	"Pookkal Pookkum"	G. V. Prakash Kumar	Tamil film, co-sung with Harini, Andrea Jeremiah, G.V. Prakash Kumar
2010	Thamassu	"Karagaridu"	Sandeep Chowta	Kannada film
2011	Tanu Weds Manu	"Piya"	Krsna Solo	
2012	Khokababu	"Mon Kaande"	Savvy Gupta	Bengali film
2012	Agneepath	"O Saiyyan"	Ajay-Atul	
2012	Kevi Rite Jaish	"Kevi Rite Jaish"	Mehul Surti	Gujarati film
2012	Maharana Pratap: The First Freedom Fighter	"Veer Pratap"	Roop Kumar Rathod	
2014	Nedunchalai	"Injathea"	C. Sathya	Tamil film
2014	Kerala Nattilam Pengaludane	"Kollai Azhage"	S.S. Kumaran	Tamil film
2014	Meinu Ek Ladki Chaahiye	"Nanhe Paon"		
2014	Rang Rasiya	"Kahe Sataye"	Sandesh Shandilya	
2015	Bas Ek Chance	"Briljo"	Pranav-Nikhil-Shailesh	Gujarati film
2017	Patel Ki Punjabi Shaadi			
2019	Cabaret			
2026	Border 2	"Ghar Kab Aaoge", "Jaate Hue Lamhon"	Anu Malik, Mithoon (recreation)	Lyrics by Javed Akhtar, Manoj Muntashir (additional)
