= Sur Jyotsna National Music Awards =

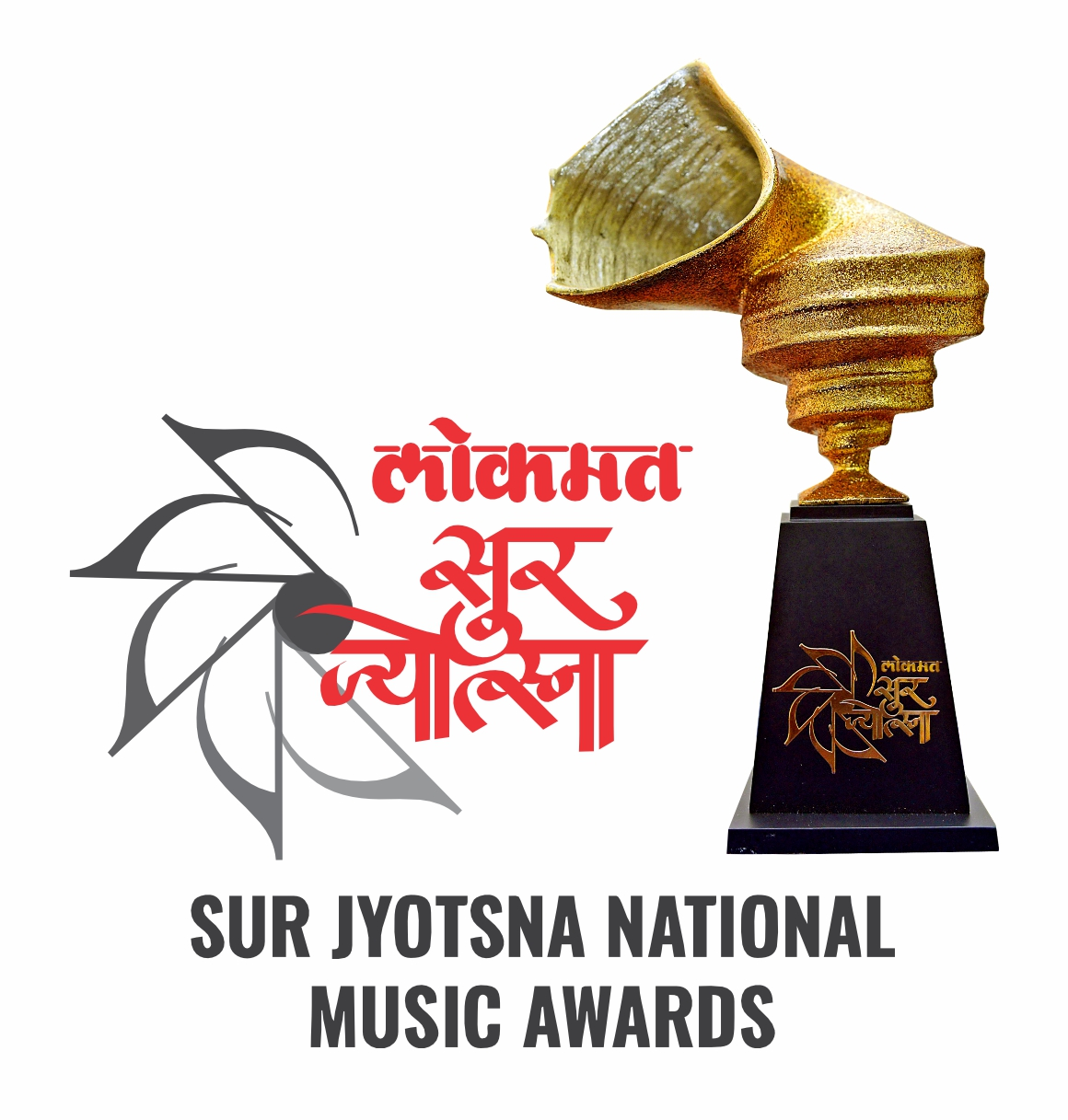
- Awarded for: Indian Music Artist
- Country: India
- Presented by: Lokmat Media
- Established: 2014
- Website: https://www.surjyotsna.org/

Sur Jyotsna National Music Awards is one of the most prestigious annual awards that honour Indian artistes and acknowledge the talent and skill of emerging musical artists in India. The award was instituted in memory of Jyotsna Darda (wife of Vijay Darda) by Lokmat media. The event is usually held in Nagpur but lately, it has been organized in other cities such as Mumbai and Delhi. In 2023, the award also created a category 'Sur Jyotsna National Music Legends'. in 2026 was held nine cities in India include Nagpur, Yavatmal, Bengaluru, Mumbai, Kolhapur, Nashik, Chhatrapati Sambhaji Nagar, Delhi and Pune for promoting young musical talent

== Memory of Jyotsna Darda ==
Jyotsna Darda founded Lokmat Sakhi Manch and was a supporter of music, particularly devotional and classical forms that resonated with her beliefs. On the first anniversary of her death on March 23, 2013, her husband Vijay Darda established the Sur Jyotsna National Music Awards in her memory. Named "Sur Jyotsna" after the melody associated with her name, the awards aim to perpetuate her commitment to nurturing music education and emerging talent. The awards' emphasis on devotional and classical Indian music traditions reflects Jyotsna Darda's roots in the genre.

== Award winners ==
- 2026: Sharayu Date & Hrishikesh Karmarkar
- 2026: Nishant Gupta - Young achievers award
- 2025: Antara Nandy, Ankita Nandy, & Aniruddh Aithal
- 2024: Dnyaneshwari Gadge & Arman Khan
- 2023: Shadaj Godkhindi & Abhilipsa Panda
- 2022: Shalmali Sukthankar & Mehtab Ali Niazi
- 2021: Lydian Nadhaswaram, & Maithili Thakur
- 2020: Hargun Kaur, & Prathamesh Laghate
- 2019: Arya Ambeker & Shikhar Naad Quereshi
- 2018: Anjali Gaikwad & Hemant Brijwasi & Brothers
- 2017: Swati Majumdar & Ramakant Gaikwad
- 2016: Ankita Joshi & S.Akash
- 2015: Pooja Gaitonde & Ojas Adhiya
- 2014: Reewa Rathod & Anvar Ali Khan

== Special Award ==
In 2026 Anu Malik was given the Special Award for his outstanding contribution to Indian music. The award recognizes his long and successful career as a music composer, music director, and singer, as well as his significant impact on the Indian music and film industry.

== Legend Award ==
The Legend Award, introduced in 2023 as part of the Sur Jyotsna National Music Awards, recognizes veteran artists for their lifelong contributions to Indian music.

=== 2026 ===
- Classical vocalist Pt. Ajay Pohankar - honored for his outstanding contribution to Indian classical and sufi music
- Jayanthi Kumaresh - honored for her exceptional contribution to Indian classical music, particularly for her mastery of the Saraswati Veena and for promoting Indian classical music globally.
- Pandit Laxman Krishnarao Pandit - honored for their lifelong dedication to preserving and promoting India's rich musical heritage.

=== 2025 ===
- Usha Mangeshkar - for her extensive discography spanning decades of Bollywood and devotional music
- Javed Akhtar- acclaimed for his poetic contributions to film songs with roots in classical Urdu and Hindustani aesthetics
- Padma Shri Pandit Ulhas Kashalkar- Hindustani vocalist specializing in khayal and rare ragas, trained under legendary gurus
- Ahmed And Mohammed Hussain- honored for their enduring legacy in Urdu poetry and melody, with classics
- Kavita Krishnamurthy- recognized for her versatile voice in over 3,000 songs across films

=== 2024 ===
- L. Subramaniam - Violin icon celebrated for his innovations in Carnatic music and fusion experiments that bridged Indian classical with Western genres, influencing generations through compositions and performances worldwide

=== 2023 ===
- Padma Vibhushan Pt. Hariprasad Chaurasia - Bamboo flute maestro renowned for his over 80 years of dedication to Hindustani classical music, including pioneering bansuri techniques and global collaborations that elevated Indian instrumental traditions

== Icon Award ==
The Icon Award, recognizing musicians who have achieved iconic status through their innovative contributions to Indian music, has been presented annually since 2023 as part of the Sur Jyotsna National Music Awards.

=== 2026 ===
- Playback Singers Shaan (Shantanu Mukherji) was honored for his versatile and remarkable contribution to the Indian music Industry
- Raghu Dixit - honored for his significant contribution to Indian folk and contemporary music, & for popularizing Indian folk-fusion music among wider audiences in India and abroad.
- Sumitra Guha - honored lifelong contribution and remarkable service to Indian classic music

=== 2025 ===
- Talat Aziz - honored for his outstanding contribution to Indian music, especially in ghazal singing
- Pandit Vijay Ghate - honored for his extraordinary contribution to Hindustani classical music, in the field of tabla
- Nitin Mukesh- honored for his long standing and significant contribution to the Indian music Industry carrying forward the legacy of his father Mukesh
- Anita Singhvi - awarded for her virtuosity on the harmonium and soulful vocal renditions in gazal and sufi genres
- Ricky Kej - awarded for fusion composition and a three-time Grammy nominee, for his contribution in global promotion of Indian instrumentation in albums like Kamasutra

=== 2024 ===
- Roopkumar Rathod - For his mastery of Sufi and Rajasthani folk traditions while bridging them with contemporary sounds

=== 2023 ===
- Shankar Mahadevan- His pioneering fusion of rock, classical, and Bollywood music, including hits like "Breathless" and compositions for films
