= Anita Singhvi =

Indian singer

- Anita Singhvi at the 1st Delhi Poetry Festival (organized by Poets Corner Group) in New Delhi on 19 January 2013

Background information
- Born: Anita; 22 July 1964 (age 62); Jodhpur, Rajasthan, India
- Origin: India
- Genre: Ghazal
- Occupation: singer
- Years active: 1990–present
- Website: jahaneghazal.com

Anita Singhvi (born 22 July 1964) is an Indian classical singer. She is an exponent of Sufi music.

== Early life ==
Anita Singhvi was born into a business family in Jodhpur, Rajasthan. She has a B.A. and LLB. She became interested in ghazal singing at the very early age of fifteen and began training under the guidance of Pandit Kshirsagar from the Gwalior gharana.

== Career ==
Anita Singhvi made her debut with Naqsh-e-Noor album. She has performed a number of concerts both in India and abroad (Middle East, Europe, America).

== Personal life ==
Anita Singhvi married noted lawyer and Indian National Congress spokesperson, Abhishek Singhvi. They have two sons.

== Award ==
Lokmat Sur Jyotsna National Music Award - 2025 Icon Award for her contribution to Indian music.

== Discography ==
- Naqsh-e-Noor
- Shame-e-Ghazal
- Sada-e-Sufi
- Zah-e-Naseeb
- Bhakti Sufi devotion
- Tajalli
