= Madhushree =

Indian playback singer

Madhushree Bhattacharya
- Born: Sujata Bhattacharya; 2 November 1969 (age 56); Kolkata, West Bengal, India
- Occupation: Playback singer
- Years active: 2002–present
- Website: madhushree.com

Madhushree Bhattacharya (born 2 November 1969) is an Indian playback singer who sings in Hindi, Tamil, Bengali, Kannada and Telugu films. She joined the Rabindra Bharati University and completed her master's degree.

== Early life ==
Madhushree was born as Sujata Bhattacharya in a Bengali family in Kolkata to Amarendranath and Parbati Bhattacharya, who were her initial teachers. She was taught classical music by Sangeetacharya Pt. Amiya Ranjan Bandyopadhyay, a noted exponent of the Bishnupur Gharana and excelled in Thumri and Khayal. Later she started working for the Indian Council for Cultural Relations, through which she was deputed to teach classical music in Suriname.

== Career ==
Madhushree recorded her music in CD and sent it to some of the noted people in the music industry CD reached Javed Akhtar. On Javed Akhtar's recommendation, she then made her debut through Rajesh Roshan's Moksha. She sang songs in films like Yuva, Aayitha Ezhuthu, Kal Ho Naa Ho. and Kuch Naa Kaho, Some of her famous song for A. R. Rahman are Tu Bin Bataye, In Lamhon Ke Daaman Me. Ham Hain Ispal Yahan.

She sang three songs in A. R. Rahman's Tehzeeb, credited as Sujata Bhattacharya. Madhushree is known for "Kabhi Neem Neem" from Yuva (2004), for which she received the Sony Stardust Award as the Best Female Sensation (Playback Singer). She also sang a song 'In Lamhon Ke Daaman Mein' from the movie Jodhaa Akbar, music directed by A. R. Rahman and Soja Zara of Bahubali 2 – The Conclusion (Nominated for Best Playback Singer by Mirchi Awards-2018). She won the 20th Edition of Lions Gold Award for All Time Film Versatile Playback Singer and the ceremony was held at Bhaidas Hall in Mumbai.

She was a judge on Zee Bangla Saregamapa (2017) with Shantanu Moitra, Kumar Sanu, Jeet Gannguli and Palak Muchhal.

== Discography ==
=== Hindi ===
Credited as Sujata Bhattacharya until "Maahi Ve" - Kal Ho Na Ho

Year	Film title	Song title	Music director	Co-singer
2001	Moksha	"Mohabbat Zindagi Hai"	Rajesh Roshan	Solo
2002	Saathiya	"Nainaa Milaike"	A. R. Rahman	Sadhana Sargam
2003	Tehzeeb	"Na Shiqwa Hota"	A. R. Rahman	Solo
2003	Tehzeeb	"Sabaq Aisa"	A. R. Rahman	Solo
2003	Tehzeeb	"Mujhpe Toofan Uthaaye"	A. R. Rahman	Solo
2003	Kuch Naa Kaho	"Tumhe Aaj Maine Jo Dekha"	Shankar–Ehsaan–Loy	Shankar Mahadevan
2003	Kal Ho Naa Ho	"Maahi Ve"	Shankar–Ehsaan–Loy	Sadhana Sargam, Sonu Nigam, Udit Narayan, Shankar Mahadevan
2003	Satta	"Jab Dil Mile"	Raju Singh	Shaan
2003	Boys	"Ale Ale"	A. R. Rahman	Shaan
2004	Swades	"Pal Pal Hain Bhari"	A. R. Rahman	Vijay Prakash, Ashutosh Gowarikar
2004	Lakeer	"Sadhiyaan Shamaa"	A. R. Rahman	Hariharan, Udit Narayan
2004	Yuva	"Kabhi Neem Neem"	A. R. Rahman	Solo
2004	Aetbaar	"Tum Mujhe Bas"	Rajesh Roshan	Kumar Sanu
2004	Dil Ne Jise Apna Kahaa	"Zindagi Hai Dua"	A. R. Rahman	Karthik, Gayatri
2005	Kisna: The Warrior Poet	"Hum Hain Is Pal Yahaan"	A. R. Rahman	Udit Narayan
2005	Vaah! Life Ho To Aisi	"Koi Aap Jaisa Mil Jaye"	Himesh Reshamiya	Kunal Ganjawala
2005	Paheli	"Kangnaa Re"	M. M. Kreem	Shreya Ghoshal, Sonu Nigam, Bela Shende
2005	Paheli	"Aadhi Raat"	M. M. Kreem	Shreya Ghoshal, Bela Shende
2005	Humdum	"Hanste Raho"	Rajesh Roy	Solo
2005	Kasak	"Jaana Hai Jaana Hai"	M. M. Kreem	Solo
2006	Rang De Basanti	"Tu Bin Bataaye"	A. R. Rahman	Naresh Iyer
2006	Yun Hota Toh Kya Hota	"Ek Baar Jaana America"	Viju Shah	Javed Ali
2006	Sauda-The Deal	"Yeh Kaun Aaya Mere Dil Mein"	Anand-Milind	Abhijeet
2007	Guru	"Baazi Lagaa"	A. R. Rahman	Udit Narayan, Swetha Mohan
2007	Sivaji – The Boss	"Wahji Wahji"	A. R. Rahman	Hariharan
2008	Jodhaa Akbar	"In Lamhon Ke Daaman Mein"	A. R. Rahman	Sonu Nigam
2008	Welcome to Sajjanpur	"Ek Meetha Marz"	Shantanu Moitra	Mohit Chauhan
2008	Mukhbiir	"Tere Bina"	Karthik Raja	Solo
2008	Chintu Ji	"Chai Ka Bahane"		Solo
2009	Blue	"Yaar Mila Tha"	A. R. Rahman	Udit Narayan
2009	What's Your Raashee?	"Sau Janam"	Sohail Sen	Udit Narayan, Sohail Sen
2010	Robot	"Boom Boom Robo Da"	A. R. Rahman	Tanvi Shah, Rags, Yogi B, Kirthi Sagathiya
2010	My Husband's Wife	"Sanso Me Teri"	Dinesh Arjuna	Kumar Sanu
2010	My Husband's Wife	"Siemat Kar"	Dinesh Arjuna	Vinod Rathod
2011	Ekk Deewana Tha	"Sharminda Hoon"	A. R. Rahman	A. R. Rahman
2011	Kashmakash	"Nauv Meri"	Raja Narayan Deb	Hariharan
2013	Raanjhanaa	"Ay Sakhi"	A. R. Rahman	Chinmayi, Vaishali, Aanchai Sethi
2014	Ebn-E-Batuta	"Anari Lover"	Tarannum Mallik	Raja Hasan
2015	Tere Ishq Mein Qurbaan	"Dil Ne Badi"	Harsh Vyas	
2015	Tere Ishq Mein Qurbaan	"Badal Chhtey"	Harsh Vyas	Udit Narayan
2017	Baahubali 2: The Conclusion	"Soja Zara"	M. M. Keeravani	Madhushree
2017	Ishq Ne Aisa Shunk Bajaya	"Love You Family"	Robby Badal	Sonu Nigam
2017	Mr. Kabaadi	"Naina Lage"	Raaj Prakash	Shaan
2017	Love You Family	"Ishq Ne Aisa"	Robby Badal	Sonu Nigam
2017	Love You Family	"Maa"	Robby Badal	
2017	Love You Family	"Love You Family"	Robby Badal	
2018	Dassehra	"Maee Re"	Vijay Verma	Rekha Bhardwaj
2021	Meenakshi Sundareshwar	"Tu Yahin Hai"	Justin Prabhakaran	Abhay Jodhpurkar
2023	Varisu	"Soul of Varisu"	Thaman S	Solo
2024	Good Morning Sunshine	"Har Karwate"	M. M. Keeravani	Neeti Mohan

=== Tamil ===
Year	Film title	Song title	Music director	Co-singer
2003	Aahaa Ethanai Azhagu	"Nilavile Nilavile"	Vidyasagar	Udit Narayan
2005	Ji	"Ding Dong"	Vidyasagar	Madhu Balakrishnan
2005	Anbe Aaruyire	"Mayilirage"	A. R. Rahman	Naresh Iyer
2006	Pori	"Perundhil Nee Enakku"	Dhina	Madhu Balakrishnan
2006	Kokki	"Ivanaa Yuvanaa"	Dhina	Karthik
2006	Kokki	"Yelo Yelo Kadhal Vandhal"	Dhina	
2006	Manathodu Mazhaikalam	"Pani Vizhum Kalam"	Karthik Raja	Karthik, Premji Amaren
2006	Thambi	"Kanavaa"	Vidyasagar	
2006	Thirumagan	"Ithuku Thaana"	Deva	Naresh Iyer
2006	Thirumagan	"Thatti Thatti"	Deva	Naresh Iyer
2006	Aadatha Aattamellam	"Uyire En Uyire"	A. R. Reihana	Narayanan
2007	Pachaikili Muthucharam	"Unakkul Naane" (Version 2)	Harris Jayaraj	
2007	Sivaji – The Boss	"Vaaji Vaaji"	A. R. Rahman	Hariharan
2007	Veerappu	"Puliya Kili"	D. Imman	Harish Raghavendra
2007	Guru	"Paisa Paisa"	A. R. Rahman	Udit Narayan
2007	Deepavali	"Kannan Varum Velai"	Yuvan Shankar Raja	Anuradha Sriram
2007	Kannamoochi Yenada	"Sanchaaram"	Yuvan Shankar Raja	Shankar Mahadevan
2007	Machakaaran	"Nee Nee"	Yuvan Shankar Raja	Hariharan
2007	Unnale Unnale	"Vaigasi Nilave"	Harris Jayaraj	Haricharan
2007	Lee	"Oru Kalavani"	D. Imman	Naresh Iyer
2007	Aalwar	"Pidikkum Unnai Pidikkum"	Srikanth Deva	
2007	Kaalai	"Eppo Nee"	G. V. Prakash Kumar	
2008	Bheema	"Ragasiya Kanavugal"	Harris Jayaraj	Hariharan
2008	Jayam Kondaan	"Naan Varaindhu Vaitha"	Vidyasagar	Hariharan
2008	Sakkarakatti	"Marudhaani"	A. R. Rahman	A. R. Rahman
2009	Sarvam	"Siragugal"	Yuvan Shankar Raja	Javed Ali
2009	Muthirai	"Uyire Uyire"	Yuvan Shankar Raja	Javed Ali
2009	Vedigundu Murugesan	"Saarale Saarale"	Dhina	Madhu Balakrishnan
2009	Aarumugam	"Rendu Rendu"	Deva	
2010	Kacheri Arambam	"Kacheri Kacheri"	D. Imman	Mukesh Mohamed
2011	Engeyum Eppodhum	"Un Peare Theriyathu"	C. Sathya	
2011	Mankatha	"Nanbane"	Yuvan Shankar Raja	Yuvan Shankar Raja
2011	Puli Vesham	"Varaen Varaen"	Srikanth Deva	Udit Narayan
2012	Aadhi Bhagavan	"Yaavum Poidhana"	Yuvan Shankar Raja	
2013	Ambikapathy	"Kanaave Kanaave"	A. R. Rahman	
2013	Ivan Veramathiri	"Ennai Marandhaen"	C. Sathya	
2014	Kannakkol	"Aasa Aasaiya"	Bobby	
2014	Nedunchaalai	"Ivan Yaaro"	C. Sathya	
2014	Nedunchaalai	"Injathea"	C. Sathya	Roopkumar Rathod
2016	Thittivasal	"Sollaamal Edho"	Harish-Sathish	Haricharan
2016	Vaarayo Vennilave	"Uyir Ennum"	Karthik Raja	
2017	Thirappu Vizha	"October Mazhayile"	Vasantha Ramesh	
2019	7	"En Aasai Macha"	Chaitan Bharadwaj	
2022	Vendhu Thanindhathu Kaadu	"Mallipoo"	A. R. Rahman	
2023	Pichaikkaran 2	"Kalloorum Poove"	Vijay Antony	Sharath Santhosh
2024	Brother	"Medhakuthu Kaalu"	Harris Jayaraj	
2025	Gangers	"En Vanmathiye"	C. Sathya	Aswath Ajith
2025	Padaiyaanda Maaveeraa	"Pattampoochi"	G. V. Prakash Kumar	
2026	Jana Nayagan	"Uravu"	Anirudh Ravichander	

=== Telugu ===
Year	Film title	Song title	Music	Co-singer
2004	Intlo Srimathi Veedhilo Kumari	"Nee Katuka"	Ghantadi Krishna	Hariharan
2004	Yuva	"Sankuratri Kodi"	A. R. Rahman	
2004	Letha Manasulu	"Tholi Tholi Korika"	M. M. Keeravani	Tippu
2007	Sivaji	"Vaaji Vaaji Vaaji"	A. R. Rahman	Hariharan
2007	Gurukanth	"Aade Aata"	A. R. Rahman	Karthik
2008	Swagatam	"Okarikokaru Nuvvu Nenani"	R. P. Patnaik	S. P. B. Charan
2008	Swagatam	"Kotta Kottaga Unnade"	R. P. Patnaik	Solo
2008	Jodhaa Akbar	"Teeya Teeyani"	A. R. Rahman	Karthik
2008	Bheema	"Rahasyapu Kalale"	Harris Jayaraj	Hariharan
2008	Homam	"Magaallu Mee Maatalo"	Nithin Raikwar	J. D. Chakravarthy
2009	Blue	"Priyudu Kalisinadaiya Nannu Kalisinadaiya"	A. R. Rahman	Udit Narayan
2009	Sarvam	"Rekkalu Vache"	Yuvan Shankar Raja	Javed Ali
2010	Puli	"Nammaka Meeyara Swami"	A. R. Rahman	K. S. Chithra, Harini
2013	Nuvve Naa Bangaram	"Pilichava"	Vinod Yajamanya	Solo
2019	7	"Sampoddoy Nanne"	Chaitan Baradwaj	Solo
2023	Virupaksha	"Kalallo"	B. Ajaneesh Loknath	Anurag Kulkarni
2023	Bichagaadu 2	"Mandhara Puvva"	Vijay Antony	Sarath Santhosh
2025	Meghalu Cheppina Prema Katha	"Kalaya Yashode"	Justin Prabhakaran	
2026	Vishnu Vinyasam	"Modhale Modhale"	Radhan	Naresh Iyer

=== Bengali ===
Year	Film	Song	Composer(s)	Writer(s)	Co-singer
2018	Chalbaaz	"Projapoti Mon"	Savvy Gupta		
2019	Dotara	"Ogo Aakash"	Shanku Mitra		

== Albums ==
Albums	Song	Singer	Composer	Lyricist	Year of release
Bhagwan Mere Bhagwan	Bhagwan Mere Bhagwan	Madhushree, Anup Jalota, Soma Ghosh, Sudesh Bhosale & Satyam Anandjee	Satyam Anandjee	Sukhnidhan Mishra	2021

== Accolades ==
Year	Award	Category	Nominated work	Result	Ref.(s)
2018	10th Mirchi Music Awards	Female Vocalist of The Year	"Soja Zara" – Baahubali 2: The Conclusion	Nominated	
2023	Edison Awards (Tamil)	Best Female Playback Singer	"Mallipoo" - Vendhu Thanindhathu Kaadu	Won	
2023	Norway Tamil Film Festival Awards	Best Female Playback Singer	"Mallipoo" - Vendhu Thanindhathu Kaadu	Won	
2023	Ananda Vikatan Cinema Awards	Best Female Playback Singer	"Mallipoo" - Vendhu Thanindhathu Kaadu	Won	
2023	Behindwoods Gold Icons	Singer Of The Year - Female	"Mallipoo" - Vendhu Thanindhathu Kaadu	Won	
2023	Just For Women Movie Awards	Best Female Playback Singer	"Mallipoo" - Vendhu Thanindhathu Kaadu	Won	
