= Soma Ghosh =

Indian performer (born 1962)

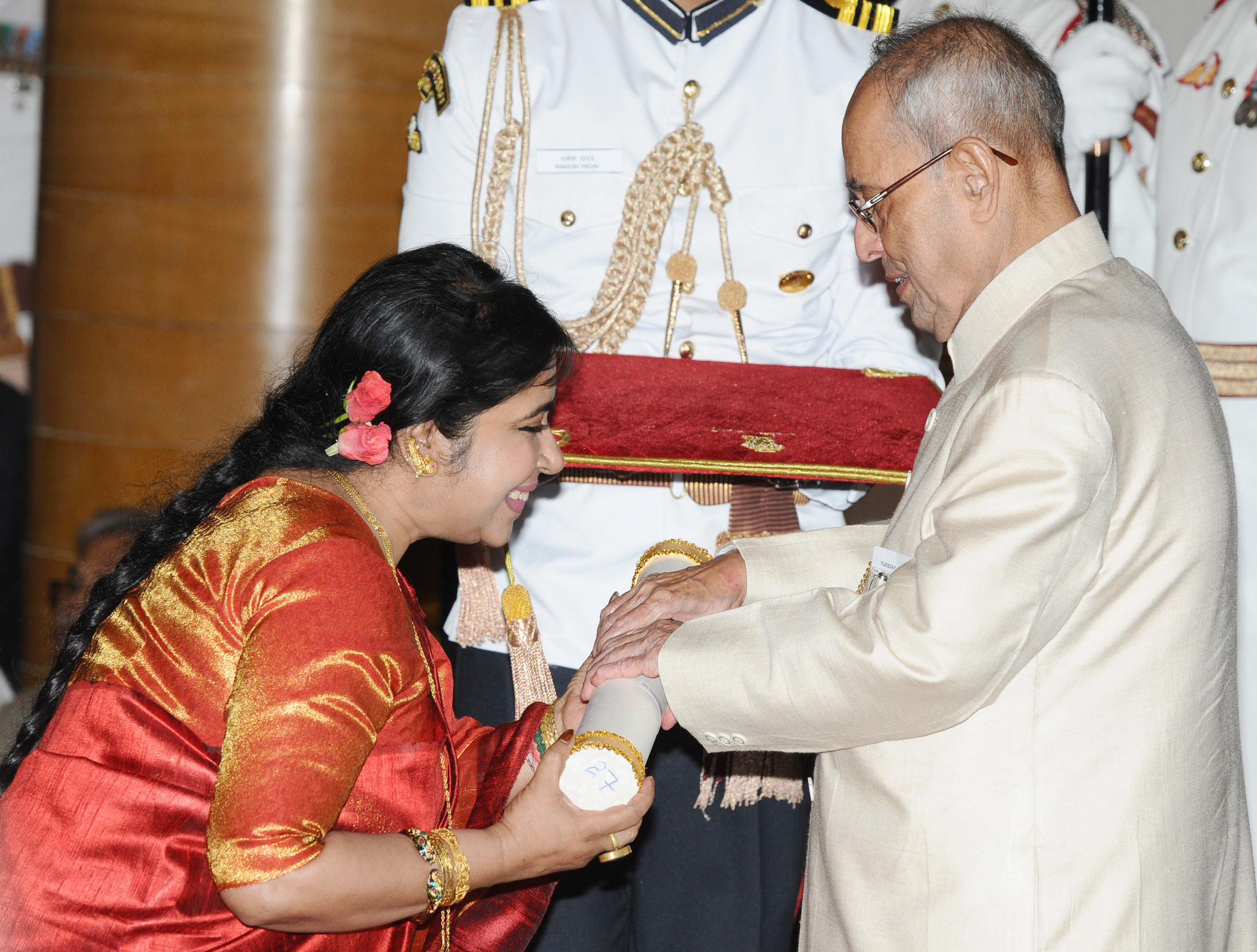
- Ghosh receiving her award in 2016
- Born: 20 April 1962 (age 64); Varanasi, Uttar Pradesh, India
- Occupations: Singer; performer
- Awards: Padma Shri (2016)

Dr. Soma Ghosh (Bengali pronunciation: [ʃoma ɡʱoʃ]; born 20 April 1962) is an Indian singer of Hindustani classical music. In 2016, she was awarded Padma Shri by the Indian Government for her contribution in arts.

== Early life and education ==
Ghosh was born and brought up in Benaras. Her parents are Archana Chakravarty and Shri Manmohan Chakravarty. She did her graduation in literature from Benaras Hindu University. She did her higher education in music with a master's degree and PhD in Hindustani Classical Music. She is a prominent exponent of the Banaras Gharana of Hindustani Classical music, received learnings from her 'Guruma' (teacher) Smt. Bageshwari Devi, in her early life.

== Career ==
Soma Ghosh is specialised in Benaras singing like Thumri, Tappa, Hori, Chaiti, Kajari, Dadra and Ghazal. She is the brand ambassador of Beti Bachao Beti Padhao Initiative. She is also a founder of the NGO called Madhu Murchhana. Dr. Soma Ghosh, widely recognized for her connection with Ustad Bismillah Khan, was adopted by the maestro after recognizing her musical talent. They performed together in various concerts, including at the Parliament of India. Their `jugalbandi' titled `Ras Barse', was attended by the then President of India Dr A. P. J Abdul Kalam sahab.

== Albums ==
Albums	Song	Singer	Composer	Lyricist	Year of Release	Released By
Bhagwan Mere Bhagwan	Bhagwan Mere Bhagwan	Soma Ghosh, Madhushree, Anup Jalota, Sudesh Bhosale & Satyam Anandjee	Satyam Anandjee	Sukhnidhan Mishra	2021	
Krishna Bhajan	1. Bata De More Shyam	Soma Ghosh			2022	Sanskar TV Music
Mohabbat Hai Toh Hai	5 ghazals	Soma Ghosh		Shayara Dipti Mishra	2019	
Adi Shankaracharya	5 stotras	Soma Ghosh			2018	Sanskar Music
Shiva Rocks	Shiv Stotras and Stutis	Soma Ghosh			2014	Sanskar TV Music
Intezaar	Thumri, Dadra & Tappa	Soma Ghosh			2013	Saregama
Ganapati Ashta Vinayak Vandana	Shree Ganesh Stuti	Soma Ghosh			2012	Sanskar TV Music
Reflections of Raga	Chhota Khayal	Soma Ghosh			2011	Saregama
He’ Shiva	Shiva Stotra & Stutis	Soma Ghosh			2011	Sanskar TV Music
Devi	Devi Stotras	Soma Ghosh			2010	Saregama
Ras Barse again	Jugalbandi Concert with Ustad Bismallah Khan	Soma Ghosh			2010	Times Music
Uski dulhan sajaungi	Ghazals of legendary shayara Parveen Shakir	Soma Ghosh			2009	Murchhana Audio & World Wide Records
Ishq	Ghazals of legendary shayara Parveen Shakir	Soma Ghosh			2009	Murchhana Audio & World Wide Records
Holi Ke Rang	Rang Darungi	Soma Ghosh			2007	Times Music
Hori	Traditional ‘Hori’ songs	Soma Ghosh			2007	Times Music
Kajari	Bheegi Jaoon Main	Soma Ghosh			2007	Times Music
Whispers of Jasmine	Recital of poems	Soma Ghosh		Dr A P J Abdul Kalam	2006	N.A.Classical
Aradhana	Rendition of bhajans	Soma Ghosh		Ustad Bismillah Khan Sahab	2003	Times Music
Ras Barse	Jugalbandi Concert with Ustad Bismallah Khan	Soma Ghosh			2001	Times Music
Hori	Recital of poems	Soma Ghosh		Kaviyatri Maya Govind	1999	Sagarika
Khayal	Ragas Lalit and Kalawati	Soma Ghosh			1997	Sagarika
Kal Ke Kalakar Series	Chhota Khayal	Soma Ghosh			1993	His Master's Voice
Singles	Song	Singer	Composer	Lyricist	Year of Release	Released By
1.	Tan Dhoya Kyun Mann Nahi Dhoya re	Soma Ghosh			2022	Sanskar TV Music
2.	Manjhi Song	Soma Ghosh	Rajeev Mahavir	Smt. Ankita Khatri	2019	T-Series
3.	Chaand Tanha	Soma Ghosh			2015	World Wide Records
4.	Shree Ganesh Stotra	Soma Ghosh			2012	World Wide Records

== Awards ==
- Padma Shri in 2016
- Big Star IMA Award for best Ghazal track of the year 2010-11 for "Faasle Aise Bhi Honge".

== Books ==
Dr. Soma Ghosh, a protégé of Bharat Ratna Ustad Bismillah Khan, launched her book "Baba & Me," providing insights into the life of the legendary shehnai maestro.
