= Purshottam Das Jalota =

Indian singer

Purshottam Das Jalota (9 September 1925 – 18 January 2011) was an Indian classical and devotional music singer, best known for his bhajans. He was awarded the Padma Shri by Government of India, in 2004.

Born in Phagwara, Punjab, he learnt Hindustani classical music from Master Ratan of Shyam Chaurasi gharana. At the age of twenty-four, he moved to Lucknow and started singing professionally. He gradually shifted to singing Bhajans and set to tune several Bhajans based on Raagdari Sangeet, or what is sometimes referred to as Indian classical music in the West. He considered that this would propagate India's rich cultural heritage as well as popularize classical music.

He was the father of the singer Anup Jalota. He died at the age of 85 on 18 January 2011.

== Awards and titles ==
- "Bhajan Samrat" by All India Hindu Mahasabha.
- The Jeevan Jagruti Manch honored him with the "Rashtra Bhushan Award" at the hands of the former President of India, Dr. Shankar Dayal Sharma, in 1992.
- He was honored by being presented the key of the city of Chicago, the US by the Mayor of Chicago.
- He was made an honorary citizen of Baltimore, U.S.A. by the Mayor of Baltimore.
- Government of India honored him with Padma Shri in the year 2004.
