= Abhishek Singhvi =

Indian politician

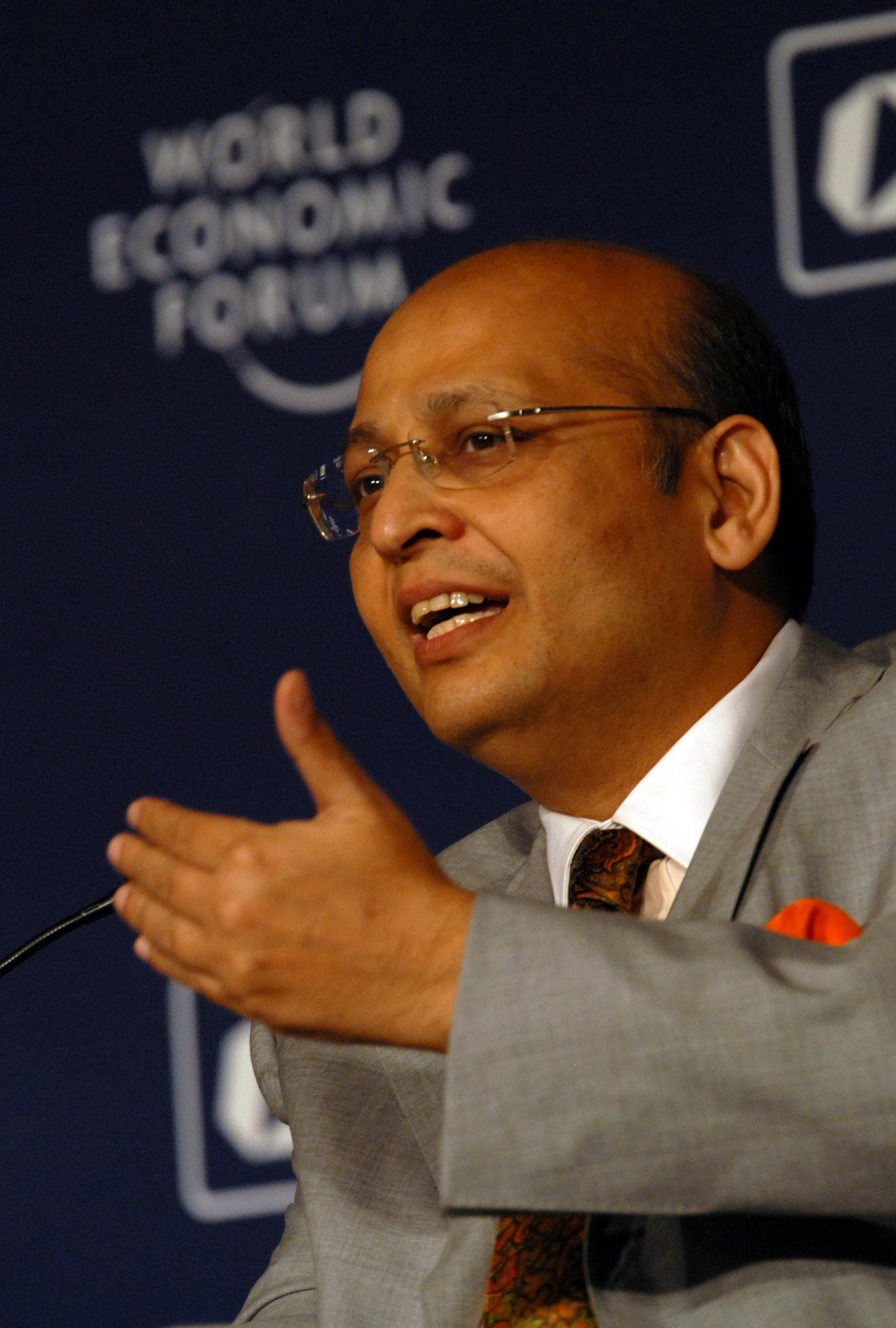
- Singhvi at the India Economic Summit, 2008

Member of Parliament, Rajya Sabha
- Incumbent
- Assumed office 28 August 2024
- Preceded by: K. Keshava Rao
- Constituency: Telangana
- In office 3 April 2018 – 2 April 2024
- Preceded by: Tapan Kumar Sen (CPI(M))
- Succeeded by: Samik Bhattacharya (BJP)
- Constituency: West Bengal
- In office 4 April 2006 – 3 April 2018
- Preceded by: Ram Jethmalani
- Succeeded by: Madan Lal Saini (BJP)
- Constituency: Rajasthan

Personal details
- Born: 24 February 1959 (age 67) Jodhpur, Rajasthan, India
- Party: Indian National Congress
- Spouse: Anita Singhvi
- Relations: Laxmi Mall Singhvi (father)
- Children: 2
- Education: University of Delhi (BA); Trinity College, Cambridge (MA, PhD); Harvard University (PIL)
- Profession: Senior Advocate
- Website: www.drabhisheksinghvi.com

Abhishek Manu Singhvi (born 24 February 1959) is an Indian senior advocate and politician. As politician, he is a member of the Indian National Congress (INC) and a member of the Parliament of India representing Telangana in the Rajya Sabha, the Upper House of the Indian Parliament, since August 2024. He is also a spokesperson for the INC. He is one of the senior advocates of the Supreme Court of India.

Singhvi was appointed as a member of Empowered Action Group of Leaders and Experts (EAGLE) which was constituted by Indian National Congress on 2 February 2025 to monitor the conduct of free and fair elections by the Election Commission of India.

== Early life and education ==
Singhvi was born into a Marwari family. His father, Laxmi Mall Singhvi, was a scholar in Jain history and culture. He was a renowned lawyer and India's former High Commissioner to the UK. He was elected to Rajya Sabha (1998–2004). His mother's name is Kamla Singhvi.

Singhvi studied at St. Columba's School, Delhi, and later attended St. Stephen's College, Delhi, where he earned a BA (Hons.) in Economics. He obtained his MA and PhD from Trinity College, Cambridge. He completed his PhD under constitutional lawyer Sir William Wade of Cambridge University. The topic of his doctoral dissertation at Cambridge University was on Emergency Powers. He also completed a summer programme in public interest litigation at Harvard University.

== Personal life ==
Singhvi is married to Anita Singhvi, an Indian classical singer and an exponent of Sufi music. They have two sons. In 2014, he was fined ₹ 57 crore by the Income Tax Settlement Commission for failing to furnish documents supporting his claims of expenditure for running his office.

== Positions held ==
Singhvi, at 37, became the youngest Additional Solicitor General of India, in 1997. He held the position for a year, until 1998.

- 2001 onwards National Spokesperson, Indian National Congress
- April 2006 Elected to Rajya Sabha
- Aug. 2006 – May 2009 and Aug. 2009 – July 2011 Member, Committee on Personnel, Public Grievances, Law and Justice
- Aug. 2006 – Aug. 2007 Member, Joint Committee on Offices of Profit Member, Joint Committee to examine the Constitutional and Legal position relating to Office of Profit Member, Consultative Committee for the Ministry of Urban Development
- Sept. 2006 – Sept. 2010 Member, Committee of Privileges
- July 2010 onwards Member, Consultative Committee for the Ministry of External Affairs
- July 2011 onwards chairman, Committee on Personnel, Public Grievances, Law and Justice Member, General Purposes Committee.
- July 2012 onwards Spokesman Congress Party.
- April 2018 elected to Rajya Sabha from West Bengal.
- Chairman of the Standing Committee on Commerce
- In 2024, Singhvi was fielded from Himachal Pradesh for the Rajya Sabha seat, but lost to Bharatiya Janata Party's Harsh Mahajan.
- On 27 August 2024, Singhvi was elected to Rajya Sabha from Telangana. and again re-elected to Rajya Sabha from Telangana for 2nd time making its 5th term in Rajya Sabha

== Election history ==
=== Rajya Sabha ===
Position	Party	Constituency	From	To	Tenure
Member of Parliament, Rajya Sabha (1st Term)	INC	Rajasthan	4 April 2006	3 April 2012	5 years, 365 days
Member of Parliament, Rajya Sabha (2nd Term)	INC	Rajasthan	4 April 2012	3 April 2018	5 years, 364 days
Member of Parliament, Rajya Sabha (3rd Term)	INC	West Bengal	3 April 2018	2 April 2024	5 years, 365 days
Member of Parliament, Rajya Sabha (4th Term)	INC	Telangana	28 Aug 2024	9 April 2026	1 year, 224 days
Member of Parliament, Rajya Sabha (5th Term)	INC	Telangana	10 April 2026	9 April 2032	5 years, 365 days
