= Jawaharlal Darda =

Indian politician (1923 – 1997)

Jawaharlal A. Darda
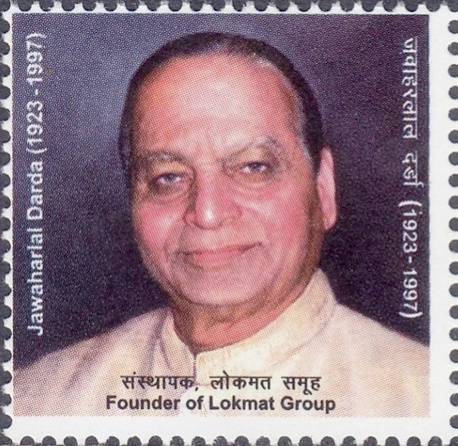

Member of Maharashtra Legislative Council
- In office (1972–1978), (1978–1984), (1984–1990), (1990 – 1996)

President of the Yavatmal City Indian National Congress
- In office 1946–1956

Cabinet Minister Government of Maharashtra
- In office March 1978 – July 1978
- Minister: Energy, Sports & Youth Welfare.

Cabinet Minister Government of Maharashtra
- In office June 1980 – Jan 1982
- Minister: Industries

Cabinet Minister Government of Maharashtra
- In office March 1985 – June 1985
- Minister: Irrigation, Tourism, Skill Development & Entrepreneurship.

Cabinet Minister Government of Maharashtra
- In office June 1985 – March 1986
- Minister: Energy, Tourism, Cultural Affairs, Irrigation and Excise Duty.

Cabinet Minister Government of Maharashtra
- In office June 1988 – March 1990
- Minister: Public Health, Medical Education, Family Welfare & Medicine.

Cabinet Minister Government of Maharashtra
- In office Jan 1991 – June 1991
- Minister: Textiles, Food and Civil Supplies, Environment,

Cabinet Minister Government of Maharashtra
- In office June 1991 – Feb 1993
- Minister: Textiles, Food and Civil Supplies, Environment.; Urban Development.

Cabinet Minister Government of Maharashtra
- In office March 1993 – March 1995
- Minister: Industries.

Personal details
- Born: July 2, 1923 Babhulgaon, Yavatmal district, Maharashtra
- Died: November 25, 1997 (aged 74) Mumbai, Maharashtra
- Spouse: Veenadevi
- Children: Vijay & Rajendra

Jawaharlal Amolakchand Darda (2 July 1923 – 25 November 1997), known popularly as Babuji, was an Indian freedom fighter and a senior Indian National Congress politician. He is the founding editor of Lokmat group of newspapers (now Lokmat Media group). He was a pioneering journalist and a prominent politician of his time.

== Career ==
Darda began as a social worker and then, inspired by Mahatma Gandhi, participated in the Satyagraha Movement in 1942 and joined the Quit India Movement, for which he was sentenced to jail for one year and 9 months. While in Jabalpur Jail. In Jabalpur Jail Darda Memorial Hall was built, where Darda was imprisoned during India's freedom struggle. This memorial hall was constructed to commemorate his contributions to the freedom struggle and public life. he organized youth conference on 10 August 1942. In 1944 he created Azad Hind Sena at Yavatmal. He remained President of the Yavatmal City Congress 1946-56. In 1973 he represented the Government of India at Copenhagen (Denmark) at an International Conference on Housing. The Government of India will be issuing a Rs 100 commemorative coin to mark the birth centenary of Jawaharlal Darda,

Darda's contribution to the freedom struggle is unparalleled. With his efforts, Yavatmal district had spontaneously responded to the call of the freedom struggle and gained the attention of legendary personalities like Mahatma Gandhi, Lokmanya Tilak, Sardar Vallabhbhai Patel, Subhas Chandra Bose and Pandit Jawaharlal Nehru. Yavatmal district was actively participating in the freedom struggle and credit for rekindling the nationalist spirit among the people there goes to veteran freedom fighters like Jawaharlal. He is amongst the most prominent freedom fighters from the Yavatmal district.

Jawaharlal Darda deeply felt about Vidarbha's progress. In his tenure as the state industry minister, he set up many industrial estates Maharashtra Industrial Development Corporation (MIDC in Vidarbha area. Darda's arguments in the state legislature were unparalleled.

== Founding Lokmat Media Group ==
Darda began his journey in journalism by launching ‘Nave Jag’ a weekly newspaper from Yavatmal to foster the spirit of nationalism, a biweekly in 1950 and later in 1952, he launched Lokmat, a Marathi weekly which was converted into a daily in 1971 from Nagpur. The title Lokmat was given by legendary freedom fighter Lokmanya Bal Gangadhar Tilak in 1918. Founder editor of the Lokmat group, Shri Darda launched several editions of Lokmat, Lokmat Samachar (Hindi) and Lokmat Times (English).

== Family ==
Jawaharlal Darda has Four children, Vijay and Rajendra (Sons); Snehal & Jayashree (daughters)

Vijay Darda, a politician of Indian National Congress party, was a Member of the Parliament of India representing Maharashtra in the Rajya Sabha since 1998 having been elected for three consecutive terms into the upper House of the Indian Parliament. He is the chairman of the Lokmat Media Group. Rajendra Darda, also a politician, elected thrice from Aurangabad East Assembly constituency since 1998. He was the Education & Industry and State Home Minister in Maharashtra Government. He is the Editor-in-Chief of Lokmat Media Group

== Political life ==
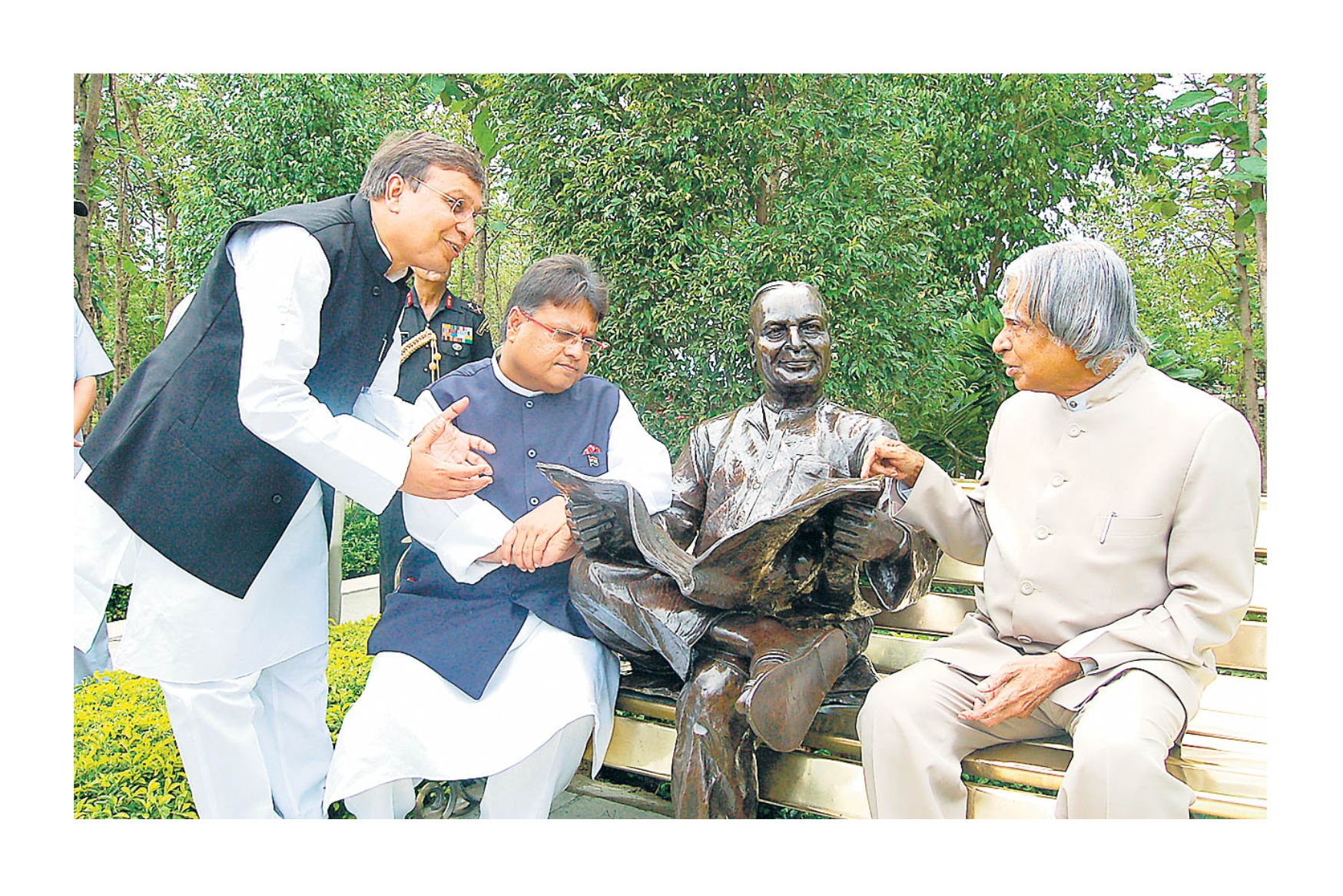
President of India Dr. A. P. J. Abdul Kalam Visit Yavatmal Prerana Sthal

Jawaharlal Darda was a loyal Congressman who rose from District Congress to All India Congress. He was elected to the Maharashtra Legislative Council for four times between 1972 & 1995. As a senior Maharashtra Minister, he ably handled many portfolios. He served as a Minister in the Maharashtra government for 23 years successfully handling the energy, industry, irrigation, health, food & civil supplies, sports, youth affair, textiles, & environment portfolios. He ushered the industrial revolution in Maharashtra buy setting up the state Maharashtra Industrial Development Corporation (MIDC) in 1980, and this led to coming up of several projects in Bhandara, Chandrapur, Aurangabad & Nagpur. He introduced innovation and transparency in the ministries he headed taking the benefit of the government schemes to the common man. A politician with vision, his efforts helped open many hospitals & medical colleges in Yavatmal & other parts of Maharashtra and the Government Medical colleges in Nagpur & Mumbai got a face-lift and hospitals here got advanced equipment. Darda set up Butibori Industrial area (MIDC), near Nagpur tenure as Industries Minister. also during his tenure that the cities of Nashik and Sambhajinagar began to industrialize.

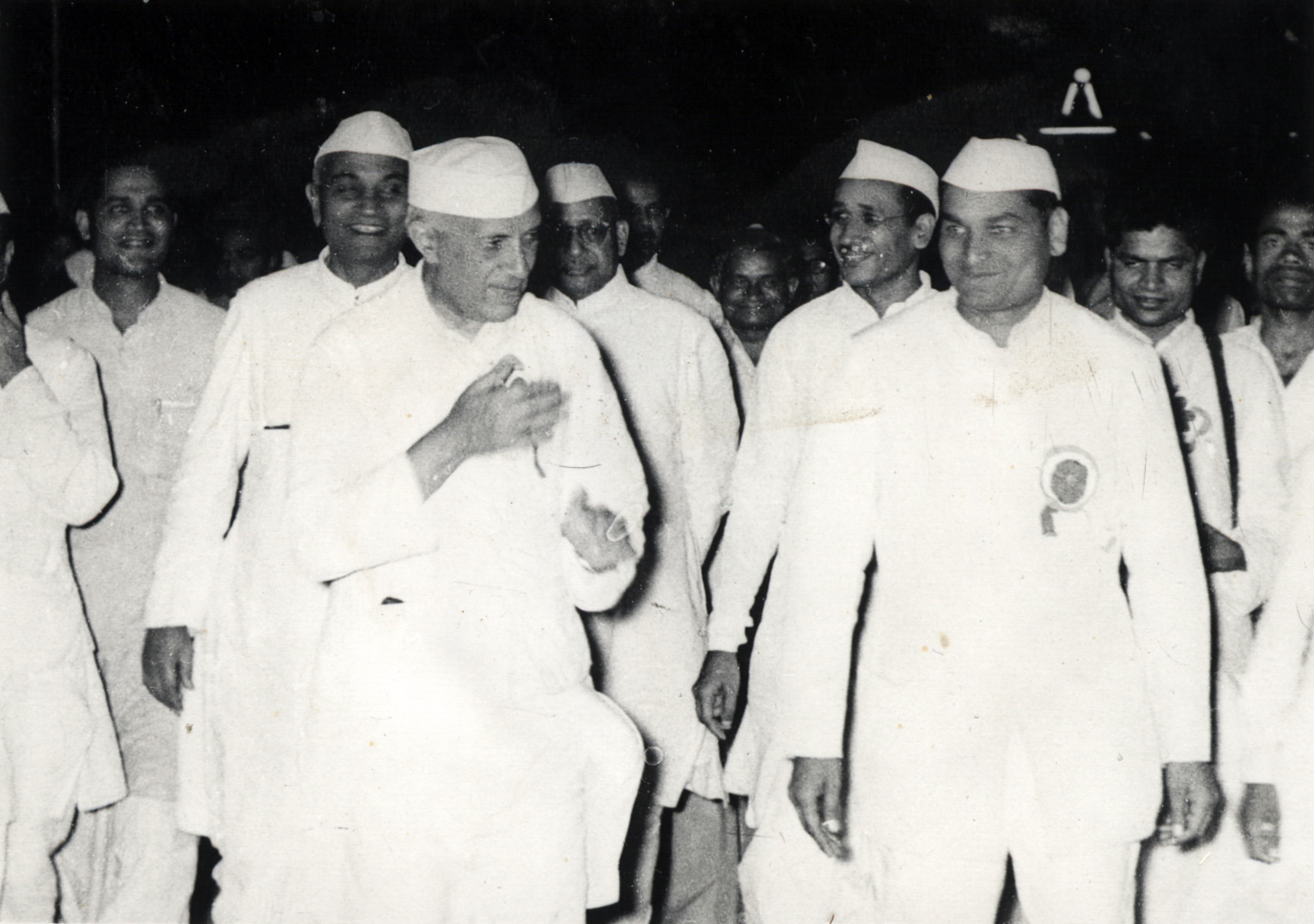
Jawaharlal Darda with first Prime Minister of India Pt. Jawaharlal Nehru

== Awards and achievements ==
On 12 September 2013, Jawaharlal Darda was posthumously conferred the Lifetime Achievement Award at UK's House of Commons.

- Yavatmal Airport is known as Jawaharlal Darda Airport.
- APMC Yavatmal is known as Jawaharlal Darda Market Yard.
- He set up the first college Amolakchand Mahavidyalaya at Yavatmal in 1956.
- Jawaharlal Darda Institute of Engineering and Technology, Yavatmal.
- Jawaharlal Darda English Medium School & Jr. College, Yavatmal.
- Jawaharlal Darda Sangeet Kala Academy, Lokmat Bhavan, Nagpur.
- Veenadevi Darda School, Yavatmal is a new-age school floated by Shri Jawaharlal Darda Education Society.
- Yavatmal Public School, Yavatmal Started in April 2006 the first CBSE school in Yavatmal.

== Death and Memorials ==
Jawaharlal Darda died on 25 November 1997 in Mumbai at the age of 74 In recognition of his contributions to journalism, politics, and social development, several posthumous honors and memorials were established. The Government of India issued a ₹5 commemorative postage stamp in his honor on 2 December 2005, released by then-Vice President Bhairon Singh Shekhawat. Another stamp was issued in 2022 to mark milestones in his legacy.
