= Reewa Rathod =

Indian singer

Reewa
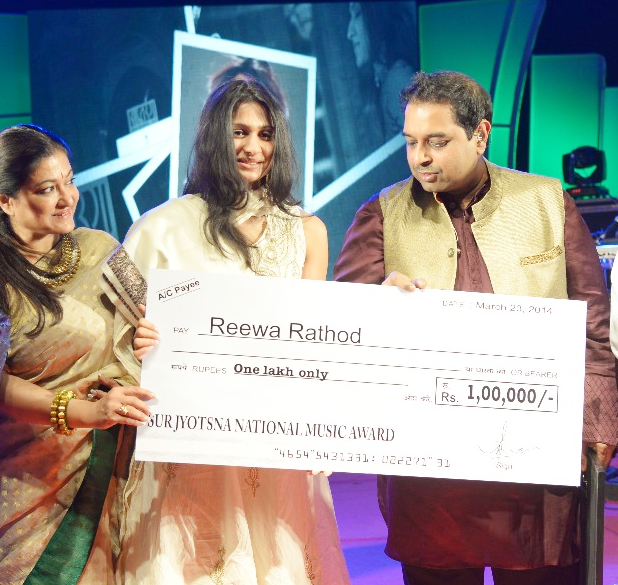
- Occupations: Singer, composer
- Years active: 2013–present
- Parents: Roop Kumar Rathod (father); Sunali Rathod (mother)
- Musical career
- Genres: Carnatic music; Fusion; Hindustani; Bollywood; English
- Instruments: Vocals, Piano
- Years active: 2013–present
- Website: reewarathod.com

Reewa Rathod is an Indian singer, songwriter, pianist, and performing artist. She is best known for her songs Maula (One Above) and Saaya Tere Ishq Ka. She won the Mirchi Music Award for Best Independent Song of The Year 2019 for her debut single Maula (One Above) 2018.

== Early life and education ==
Reewa Rathod was born in Mumbai to singers Roop Kumar Rathod and Sunali Rathod. Reewa started learning music from her father Roop Kumar Rathod training in Hindustani, Carnatic and Western Classical. She has passed all 8 grades of Western classical piano from the Associated Board Of the Royal Schools of Music London.

== Career ==
Reewa's first public performance was at the age of 4 years at Tejpal Auditorium Mumbai for her Grandfather Late Pandit Chaturbhuj Rathod's 1st Death Anniversary. Her first public performance as an artist came as the opening act for a Bryan Adams concert in 2011 in Pune, where she sang "Crossing Limits", a self-penned song.

She performed at the Doon School's Rose Bowl in 2012 and Saptrang in 2014. She was awarded Sur Jytosna National Music Award.

Reewa's song "Enroute Ganesha" was selected for the 20th year compilation of ‘Budhha-Bar'. She has recorded several tracks with Dj Ravin (Buddha Bar) and is one of the first Indian artists to get her works published under the lounge music label Buddha Bar Paris.

She composed and recorded Tandaana for the Spanish film Rastres De Sandal (Traces of Sandalwood) starring Nandita Das and Aina Clotet.

Reewa’s debut single "Maula (One Above)" (2018) has surpassed over 2 million views on YouTube and has won the Pepsi Mirchi music award for Best Independent Song of The Year in 2019.

"Saanwal", the first track of her project "Travel with Masters" was released on 17 January 2019, produced by Ustad Zakir Hussain and Michael Mennart, featuring saxophonist Chris Potter. The song blended Indian Folk and Spanish sound together.

In 2020 she released her debut album Saaya Tere Ishq Ka which was composed by Reewa with lyrics by Gulzar. The title track "Maula (One Above)" was mixed and mastered by Brian Malouf.

Reewa has performed "Jasmine Flower" in Chinese, for Yue-sai Kan's live-streaming charity fashion gala 2020, alongside Kenny G, Lang Lang and three other prominent artists in the UK, Norway and France.
