= Mission Ustaad =

Mission Ustaad is an Indian musical reality show produced by Endemol India, that premiered on 1 December 2007. The show was telecast every Friday and Saturday at 9 pm on 9X Media Channel. Featuring eight famous Indian singers as contestants, the show aimed to create awareness about the United Nations (UN) Millennium Development Goals (MDGs) across the country.

The show was hosted by Simone Singh and the judges were composer A. R. Rahman, lyricist and scriptwriter Javed Akhtar and actress Lara Dutta.

The 9X channel contributed all the profits from the SMS messages received for Mission Ustaad to the United Nations Millennium Development Goals in India.

The Grand Finale was held on 23 February 2008. Sunali Rathod & Roop Kumar Rathod were crowned with the "Ustaad Jodi" title.

== Contestants ==
The four pairs of contestants (jodis) were:

- Vasundhara Das & Mohit Chauhan
- Mahalakshmi Iyer & Kailash Kher
- Shweta Pandit & Naresh Iyer
- Sunali Rathod & Roop Kumar Rathod

These four pairs of singers sang songs based on weekly themes linked to the United Nations (UN) Millennium Development Goals (MDGs) and were judged by the three judges and the viewers. The viewers voted for their favorite jodi each week. The jodi which got the maximum number of votes was crowned the Jodi of the Week. The jodi that made the biggest impact week after week was proclaimed the Ustaad Jodi. There were no eliminations.
