= Sunali Rathod =

Indian playback singer

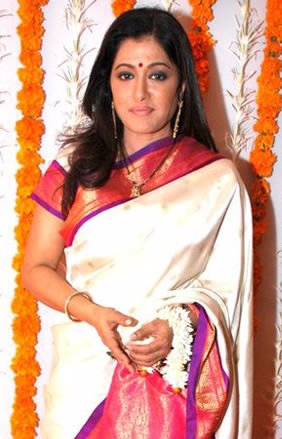
- Sunali Rathod in 2009

Background information
- Born: 17 January 1970 (age 56)
- Genres: Playback Singer, Ghazal
- Spouse(s): Anup Jalota (divorced); Roopkumar Rathod
- Website: www.roopsunali.com

Sunali Rathod is an Indian playback singer. She is also a trained classical singer.

== Personal life ==
Sunali Rathod was born Sonali Sheth on 17 January 1970 into a Gujarati family in Mumbai. She studied in St. Xavier's College, Mumbai. She was bhajan singer Anup Jalota's first wife and married him (against his family's approval) while still a music student, but subsequently divorced him to marry Roop Kumar Rathod, (tabla player), playback singer, music director and a composer. They have a daughter named Surshree or Reewa.

== Career ==
She started to perform at the age of 10 under the guidance of Gujarati music composer Shri Purshottam Upadhyay. During this stage she was introduced to Pandit Hridaynath Mangeshkar, who became her mentor. She also learnt the intricacies of Indian classical music Classical music under Ustaad Faiyyaz, Niyaz Ahmed Khan, Ustad Mashkoor and Mubarak Ali Khan of Kirana School of Music. She sings in languages like Hindi, Gujarati, Marathi, Bengali, English, Telugu etc..

At the age of 18, she released her first EP record of Gujarati song with His Master's Voice. In 1987, she released her first Ghazal album, ‘Aghaaz’. She also won the Best Ghazal singer award in 1987 by Emirates International in Dubai. She has sung various types of music such as Ghazal, Bhajan, Kheyal, Tappa and Light music.

On 15 August 2005 Sunali Rathod and Roop Kumar Rathod gave a guest appearances in sitcom set called Sarabhai vs Sarabhai one of the best Indian comedy show which was aired on channel STAR One in India. She along with her husband Roop Kumar Rathod participated in Mission Ustaad, an Indian musical reality show and were crowned with the "Ustaad Jodi’ title which was held on 23 February 2008. Sunali Rathod also performed in a unique webcert called "She is a Winner" celebrating Women's day in 2011 alongside artists like Hema Sardesai, Kuhoo Gupta, Sunita Rao, Shibani Kashyap and many more.

She recently released a Sufi album along with Roop Kumar Rathod called Kalmaa.

== TV appearances ==
Sunali Rathod and Roop Kumar Rathod participated in Mission Ustaad, an Indian musical reality show, which also crowned them as the "Ustaad Jodi". They also gave a guest appearance in an Indian Comedy TV serial called Sarabhai vs Sarabhai.

== Awards ==
Sunali Rathod was announced as the Best Ghazal singer award in 1986 for her debut album ‘Aaghaaz’.
