= Sakal Jain Samaj =

- Formation: 15 September 1994
- Founder: Vijay Darda
- Headquarters: Nagpur, India
- Region served: Maharashtra, India

Sakal Jain Samaj is a national not for profit organization in India. It aims to strengthen the spirit of tolerance in the country by uniting all sections of society, as well as various sects and faiths. Vijay Darda National President Sakal Jain Samaj. The organization also work towards social justice.

== History ==
Sakal Jain Samaj was founded in 1994 by an Indian politician and member of Indian National Congress, Vijay J. Darda. Dr. Darda is accomplished journalist and also a politician. He is recognized for his significant contributions to social upliftment during his 18-year parliamentary tenure. At the time of the establishment of the Sakal Jain Samaj clear at its inception that it would work for the upliftment of people across all religions, sects, and ideologies. The objective of this organization is to further strengthen the fabric of a society based on love and harmony. Those associated with it have been working towards social harmony, and this series of social initiatives continues uninterrupted to this day. The organizing teachings, events, and celebrations. The Sakal Jain community is founded on the principles of non-violence, friendship, love, and harmony. While upholding the Indian Constitution, this organization works towards the upliftment and development of the community. It advocates the belief that Jain principles and philosophy strengthen the nation and foster prosperity, love, and a sense of brotherhood in the lives of the common people. The Sakal Jain Foundation operates within the framework of the Constitution and respects all religions; the organization emphasizes the creation of a society free from animosity.

The Mahavir Janmotsav Samiti, under the Sakal Jain Samaj, in worked with the Jain Alert Group, had organized a two day exhibition at the Hirakaka Kasliwal Prangan of the Khandelwal Digambar Jain Panchayat in Rajabazar.

On 9 April 2022, Jain Alert Group had organized a two day Jain Expo at Mahavir Bhavan, Kumbharwada, to showcase and promote products made by women entrepreneurs of the Sakal Jain Samaj.

== Jain Sects ==
- 1. Shvetambar Sthanakvasi (Sarva Vardhaman Shvetambar Sthanakvasi): They do not practice idol worship and place importance on discourses and meditation.
- 2. Mandir Margi (Shvetambar Murtipujak): They practice idol worship in temples and observe religious rituals.
- 3. Terapanthi: Founded by Acharya Bhikshu; based on discipline and leadership under a single Acharya.
- 4. Digambar Sect: Based on rigorous penance and renunciation; Digambar monks do not wear clothes.
