= Sudesh Bhosale =

Indian actor and singer (born 1960)

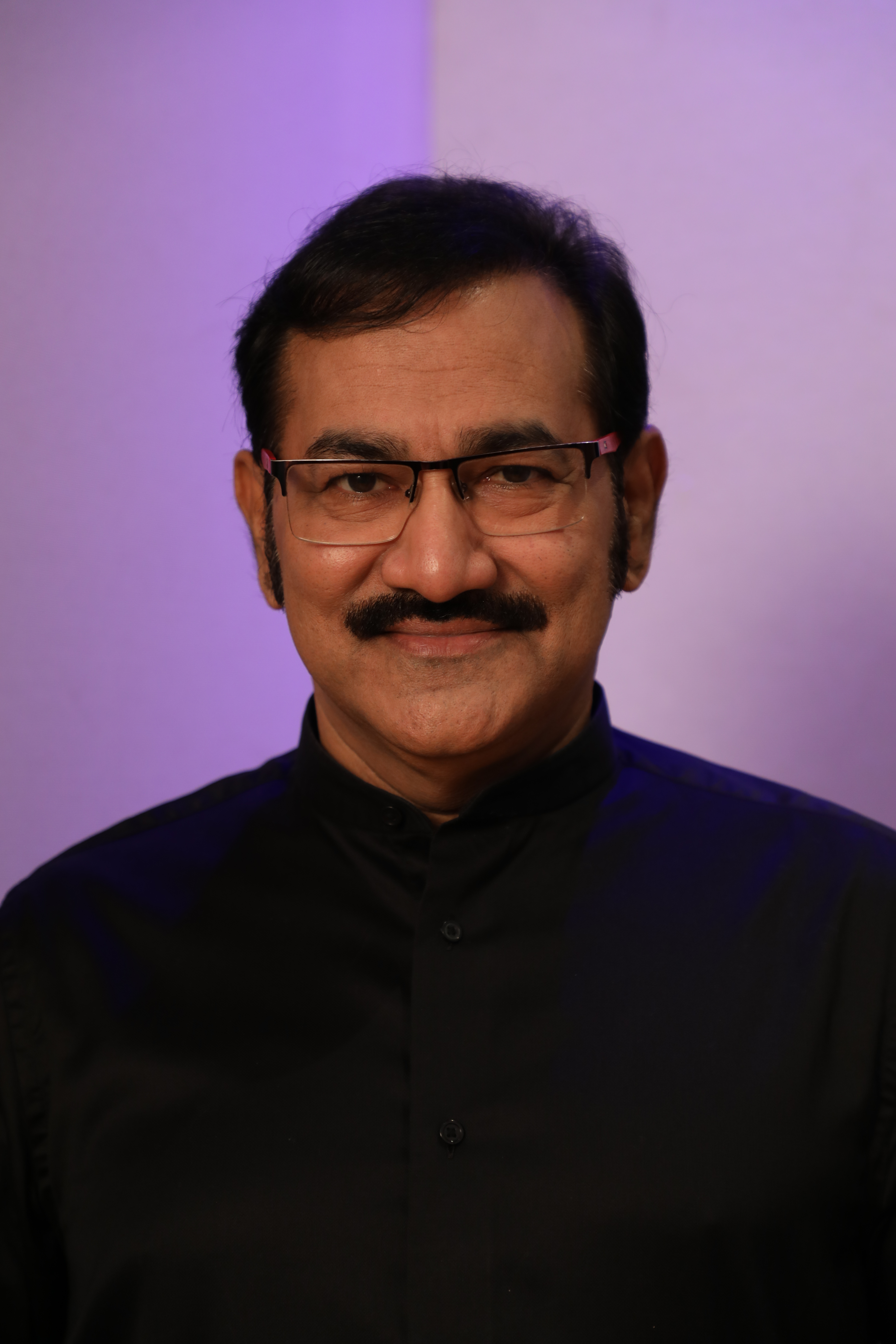
- Bhosale in 2021
- Born: 1 July 1960 (age 66); Mumbai, Maharashtra, India
- Occupations: Playback singer; dubbing artist
- Years active: 1988–present

Sudesh Bhosale (born 1 July 1960) is an Indian playback singer who primarily sings for Marathi and Bollywood films. Bhosale is known for his ability to mimic actor Amitabh Bachchan, having sung for him in various films.

== Career ==
Bhosale was born on 1 July 1960 to Sumantai Bhosale and studied in Ambedkar College, Wadala. He got his first major break in playback singing in the film Zalzala (1988). He used mimicry to become a professional dubbing artist for several artists like Sanjeev Kumar and Anil Kapoor.

He dubbed for Sanjeev Kumar when he died prematurely before completing the film Professor Ki Padosan. He has sung songs for the movie Ghatothkach in 2008.

Bhosale is the producer and judge on K For Kishore, a singing contest on Sony Entertainment Television. He has sung many famous Bollywood songs for Amitabh Bachchan including "Jumma chumma de de" from 1991 movie Hum, "Meri Makhna Meri Soniye" from Baghban and others. He mimicked for Amitabh Bachchan in movies such as Family.

He can also mimic numerous Bollywood stars including Ashok Kumar (Dadamoni), Amitabh Bachchan, Vinod Khanna, Anil Kapoor, Sunil Dutt and others.

== Accolades ==
He has been awarded the Mother Teresa Millennium Award for his contribution to music in a ceremony in Kolkata in 2008.

== Personal life ==
Sudesh Bhosale was born in a Konkani speaking family from Shiroda, Goa. He is married to Hema Bhosle. They have one son named Siddhant and a daughter named Shruti.

== Discography ==
Year	Film	Title	Music	Lyrics	Co-singer(s)	Note
1988	Waqt Ki Awaz	"Ek Do Teen Chaar, Pyar Chahiye Kitni Baar"	Bappi Lahiri	Indeevar	Alisha Chinai	
1988	Zalzala	"Holi Aayi Re, Aayi Re Aayi Holi Aayi"	R. D. Burman	Gulshan Bawra	Anuradha Paudwal	
1990	Ajooba	"Ary Tajjub Hai"	Laxmikant–Pyarelal	Anand Bakshi	Mohammad Aziz	
1990	Ajooba	"Oh Mera Jaan-E-Bahar Aa Gaya"	Laxmikant–Pyarelal	Anand Bakshi	Mohammad Aziz, Alka Yagnik, Anuradha Paudwal	
1990	Ajooba	"Ya Ali Ya Ali"	Laxmikant–Pyarelal	Anand Bakshi		
1990	Agneepath	"Ganpati Apne Gaon Chale"	Laxmikant–Pyarelal	Anand Bakshi	Kavita Krishnamurthy & Anupama Deshpande	
1991	Saudagar	"Emli Ka Boota"	Laxmikant–Pyarelal	Anand Bakshi	Mohammad Aziz	
1991	Hum	"Ek Doosre Se Karte Hain Pyaar Hum"	Laxmikant–Pyarelal	Anand Bakshi	Mohammad Aziz, Alka Yagnik, Udit Narayan, & Sonali Vajpayee	
1991	Hum	"General Sahab Karo Tayari"	Laxmikant–Pyarelal	Anand Bakshi	Alka Yagnik, Vinay Mandke	
1991	Hum	"Is Pyaar Ki Hum Pehchan Denge"	Laxmikant–Pyarelal	Anand Bakshi	Alka Yagnik, Mohammad Aziz, Vinay Mandke	
1991	Hum	"Jumma Chumma De De"	Laxmikant–Pyarelal	Anand Bakshi	Kavita Krishnamurthy	
1991	Akayla	"Mujhe Aaj Kuch Na Kehna"	Laxmikant–Pyarelal	Anand Bakshi	Alka Yagnik	
1991	Akayla	"Chal Chal Ri Chal"	Laxmikant–Pyarelal	Anand Bakshi		
1991	Pyar Ka Devta	"Meri Dukan Pe Ana Meri Jaan"	Laxmikant–Pyarelal	Anand Bakshi		
1993	Darr	"Ang Se Ang Lagana"	Shiv–Hari	Anand Bakshi	Vinod Rathod, Alka Yagnik & Devki Pandit	
1993	Aankhen	"O Lal Dupatte Wali"	Bappi Lahiri	Indeevar	Kumar Sanu, Kavita Krishnamurthy & Alka Yagnik	
1993	Tirangaa	"Pee Le Pee Le Oh More Raja"	Laxmikant–Pyarelal	Santosh Anand	Mohammad Aziz	
1993	Dil Hi To Hai	"Ek Ladki Ka Main Deewana"	Laxmikant–Pyarelal	Anand Bakshi	Mukul Agarwal	
1993	Dil Hi To Hai	"Chhat Ke Upar Do Kabootar"	Laxmikant–Pyarelal	Anand Bakshi	Sagarika Mukherjee, Sonal Bajpai, Manhar Udhas	
1993	Dil Hi To Hai	"Sahiba O Sahiba"	Laxmikant–Pyarelal	Anand Bakshi	Amit Kumar, Alka Yagnik	
1993	Dil Hi To Hai	"Chhat Ke Upar Do Kabootar" (Version 2.3)	Laxmikant–Pyarelal	Anand Bakshi	Jackie Shroff, Manhar Udhas	
1993	Professor Ki Padosan	"Mai Hu Tu Hai Aur Tanhayi"	R. D. Burman	Gulshan Bawra	Kavita Krishnamurthy	
1993	Professor Ki Padosan	"Modern Girl Pehn Ke Chote Diamond"	R. D. Burman	Gulshan Bawra	Alka Yagnik, Padmini	
1993	King Uncle	"Fenny Ne Mujhe Bulaya"	Rajesh Roshan	Javed Akhtar	Asha Bhosle	
1994	Krantiveer	"Love Rap"	Anand–Milind	Sameer	Amit Kumar, Sapna Mukherjee & Poornima	
1994	Juaari	"Haara Khiladi Jeet Gaye Hum"	Bappi Lahiri	Anwar Sagar	Abhijeet Bhatacharya, Kavita Krishnamurthy, Pritha Mazumdar	
1995	Gunehgaar	"Rain Is Falling"	Shyam Sunder Premi (Shyam Sunder)	Surendra Sathi		
1995	Karan Arjun	"Bhangra Paale"	Rajesh Roshan	Indeevar	Mohammad Aziz & Sadhana Sargam	
1995	Trimurti	"Bol Bol Bol"	Laxmikant–Pyarelal	Anand Bakshi	Ila Arun & Udit Narayan	
1997	Mrityudata	"Na Na Na Na Re"	Anand–Milind	Sameer	Daler Mehndi	
1997	Aar Ya Paar	"Dil Diya Pyar Kiya"	Viju Shah	Maya Govind	Asha Bhosle	
1998	Major Saab	"Deewana Ban"	Anand Raj Anand	Anand Raj Anand, Dev Kohli		
1998	Major Saab	"Sona Sona"	Aadesh Shrivastava	Anand Raj Anand, Dev Kohli	Sonu Nigam & Jaspinder Narula	
1998	Bade Miyan Chote Miyan	"Assi Chutki Nabbe Taal"	Viju Shah	Sameer	Udit Narayan	
1998	Bade Miyan Chote Miyan	"Assi Chutki Nabbe Taal" (II)	Viju Shah	Sameer	Udit Narayan	
1998	Bade Miyan Chote Miyan	"Bade Miyan Chote Miyan"	Viju Shah	Sameer	Udit Narayan	
1998	Bade Miyan Chote Miyan	"Dhin Tak Din"	Viju Shah	Sameer	Jaspinder Narula	
1998	Bade Miyan Chote Miyan	"Deta Jai Jo Re" (II)	Viju Shah	Sameer	Alka Yagnik, Kavita Krishnamurthy, Udit Narayan	
1999	Kohram	"Hum Hai Banaras Ke Bhaya"	Dilip Sen, Sameer Sen	Dev Kohli	Amit Kumar	
1999	Kohram	"Ik Mashuka Hai Yeh Jindagee Tum Ho Isape Shaida"	Dilip Sen, Sameer Sen	Dev Kohli	Amit Kumar	
2000	Raju Chacha	"Aaj Ka Kya Program Hai"	Jatin–Lalit	Anand Bakshi	Kavita Krishnamurthy, Abhijeet Bhattacharya	
2001	Kabhi Khushi Kabhie Gham	"Say Shava Shava"	Aadesh Shrivastava	Sameer	Alka Yagnik, Sunidhi Chauhan, Udit Narayan, Aadesh Shrivastava, Amitabh Bachchan	
2003	Baghban	"Meri Makhna Meri Soniye"	Aadesh Shrivastava	Sameer		
2004	Ab Tumhare Hawale Watan Saathiyo	"Kurti Malmal Di"	Anu Malik	Sameer	Anuradha Paudwal, Kailash Kher, Sneha Pant, Sonu Nigam	
2006	Sandwich	"Bedhadak"	Sandeep Chowta	Nitin Raikwar	Jaspinder Narula	
2006	Vivah	"Tere Dware Pe Aai Baraat"	Ravindra Jain			
2010	Golmaal 3	"Yaad Aa Raha Hai"	Bappi Lahiri	Anjaan		
2010	Toonpur Ka Superrhero	"Rubdoot"	Anu Malik	Mumzy Stranger	Sonu Nigam, Ajay Devgn, Altaf Raja	
2013	Deewana Main Deewana	"Kala Doriya Kala Doriya"	Bappi Lahiri		Ila Arun, Sunidhi Chauhan	
2018-2020	Dil Hi Toh Hai	"Chhat Ke Upar Do Kabutar"	Laxmikant–Pyarelal (Recreated by Pamela Jain)	Anand Bakshi	Manhar Udhas	TV series
2022	Shamshera	"Kaale Naina"	Mithoon	Mithoon, Traditional	Shadaab Faridi, Neeti Mohan	
2022	Shamshera	"Kannale" (Tamil Dubbed Version)	Mithoon	Madhan Karky	Yazin Nizar, Neeti Mohan	
2022	Shamshera	"Aame Kallu" (Telugu Dubbed Version)	Mithoon	Chaitanya Prasad	Yazin Nizar, Neeti Mohan	

=== Hindi non-film songs ===
Year	Album	Song	Music	Lyrics	Co-singer(s)	Ref
2021	Bhagwan Mere Bhagwan	"Bhagwan Mere Bhagwan"	Satyam Anandjee	Sukhnidhan Mishra	Anup Jalota, Soma Ghosh, Madhushree & Satyam Anandjee	
