= Anup Jalota =

Indian singer

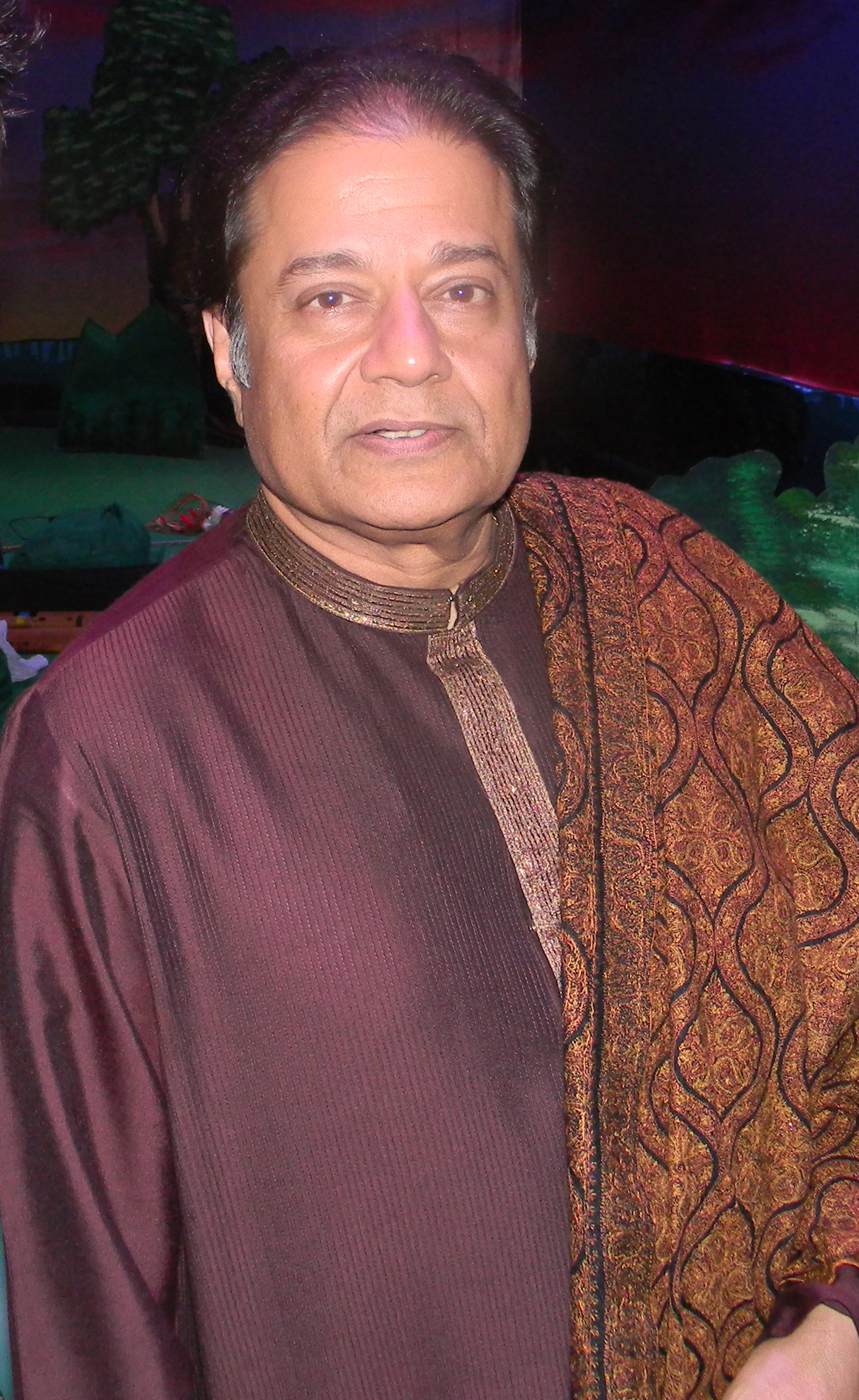
- Jalota in 2011
- Born: Anup Purushottamdas Jalota; 29 July 1953 (age 73); Nainital, Uttar Pradesh, India (present–day Uttarakhand)
- Education: Bhatkhande Music Institute
- Occupation: Singer
- Spouses: Sonali Sheth (div. 1984): Bina Bhatia (div.); Medha Gujral (m. 1994; died 2014)
- Children: 1
- Father: Purshottam Das Jalota
- Honours: Padma Shri (2012)
- Musical career
- Also known as: Bhajan Samraat
- Origin: Phagwara, Punjab, India
- Genres: Bhajan, Ghazal
- Instruments: Vocals and Harmonium
- Years active: 1975–present
- Website: anupjalota.in

Signature
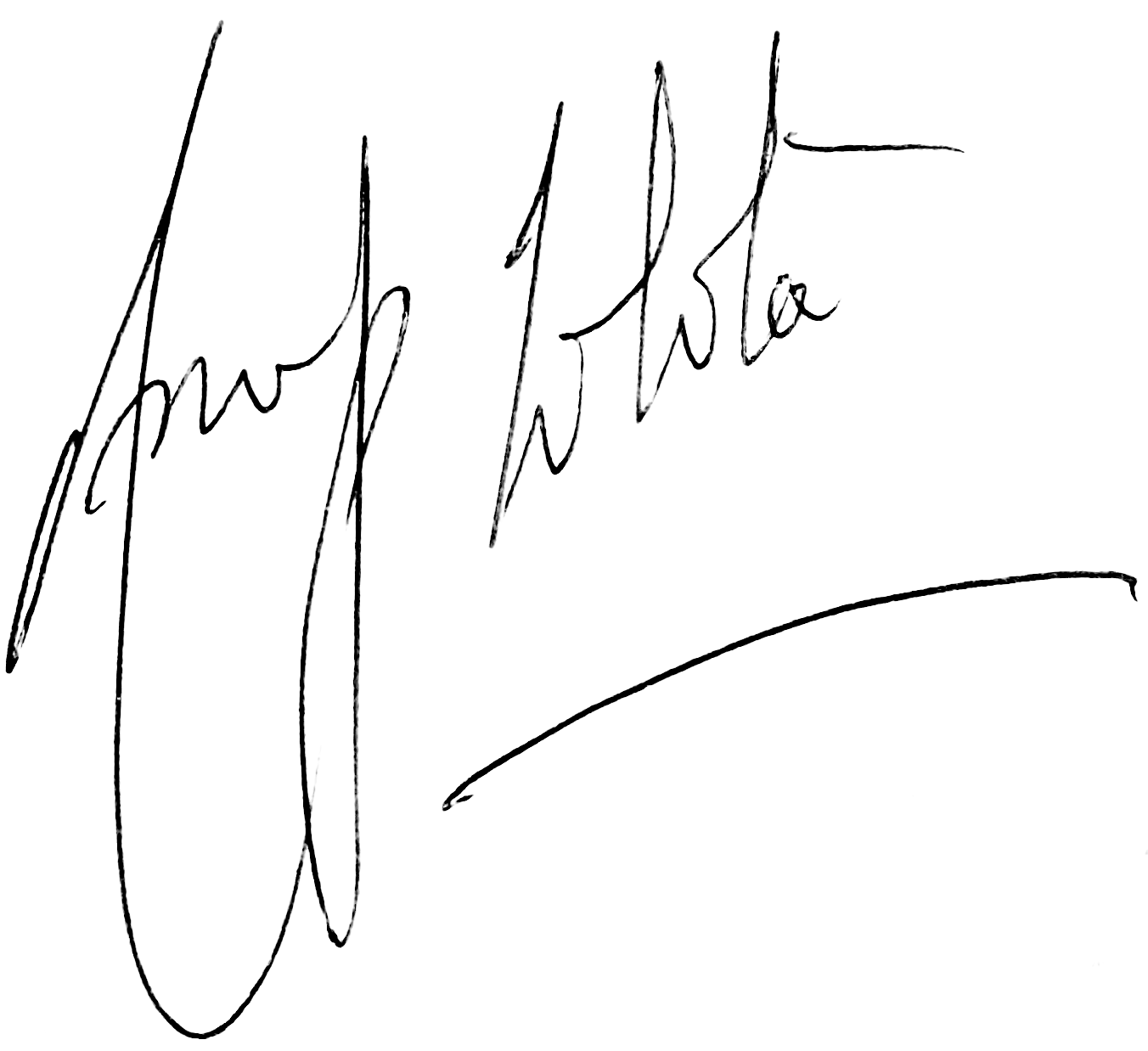

Anup Purushottamdas Jalota (born 29 July 1953) is an Indian singer, musician and actor, best known for his contributions to the bhajan and ghazal genre of Indian music. He is popularly known as the Bhajan Samraat (transl. "Emperor of Bhajan"). The Padma Shri was awarded to him by the Government of India in 2012. He was a contestant on the reality show Bigg Boss 12.

== Early life and background ==
Anup Purushottamdas Jalota was born in Nainital to an Indian Punjabi Hindu family and hails from the Sham Chaurasia gharana of Punjab. He was educated at Lucknow's Bhatkhande Music Institute. His father, Purshottam Das Jalota, was also a bhajan singer. He also spent few years in Savarkundla, Gujarat in his early days. He also obtained a Bachelor of Arts degree from the University of Lucknow.

== Career ==
Jalota started his musical career as a chorus singer in All India Radio. He is usually backed by a santoor player, dholak player, sarod player, sarangi player, violinist, sitar player, tabla player and guitarist. Some of his popular bhajans include Aisi Lagi Lagan, Main Nahi Makhan Khayo, Rang De Chunariya, Jag Me Sundar Hai Do Naam, and Chadariya Jhini Re Jhini. He was also the presenter of the program Dharam Aur Hum, telecast in Star Plus from 2002 to 2005. He met Jagadguru Shree Kripaluji Maharaj in Mumbai and agreed to release several CDs of his compositions. In 2008 he recorded the title song "Golden Memorable Yaadein" for the CD "Noorani Chehra", produced by Shaukat (Sam) Kassam to commemorate the Golden Jubilee of the Aga Khan.

On 16 September 2018, Jalota entered Bigg Boss house in its twelfth season, as a contestant, along with Jasleen Matharu.

Anup Jalota shared on Jay-Ho! The Jay Kumar Show that, over his 50-year career, he's seen many talented singers who became very famous but couldn't keep that fame. He thinks staying famous isn't just about becoming popular, but also about keeping it through being humble, respectful, and professional. He stressed that it's important not to let success make you arrogant and to treat every performance as a chance to connect with your audience.

== Personal life ==
Jalota's first marriage was to Sonali Sheth, a Gujarati girl who was then a music student and later a singer. They married without his family's approval. The couple became popular in the North Indian live performance circuit as "Anup and Sonali Jalota," which disbanded after their divorce.

His second marriage was an arranged one, to Bina Bhatia, which too ended in divorce. Anup's third marriage was to Medha Gujral, niece of former Indian Prime Minister I. K. Gujral and director Shekhar Kapur's first wife whom he had divorced in 1994. Anup and Medha have a son named Aryaman (born in 1996), who studied at Princeton University. Medha died on 25 November 2014 in New York City of renal failure following a second heart and first kidney transplant.

It came to light in 2018 that he had been in a relationship with Bigg Boss 12 contestant Jasleen Matharu, who is thirty-seven years younger than him. They had been together at least three and a half years prior. However, after getting evicted from the house, Anup said their relationship was only of a teacher and student.

Jalota also held charity concerts and created a fund to support Indian victims' families affected by the September 11 attacks.

== Awards ==
The Padma Shri, India's fourth highest civilian honour, was given to Jalota by the Government of India in 2012.

== Discography ==
The bhajans and ghazals for which he is credited the most are listed below.

=== Bhajans ===
- Aisi Lagi Lagan
- Jag Mein Sundar Hain Do Naam
- Kabhi Kabhi Bhagwan Ko Bhi
- Tere Man Mein Raam
- Rang De Chunariya
- Prabhuji Tum Chandan Hum Pani
- Suraj Ki Garmi Se
- Bhajan Prabhat
- Bol Pinjire Ka Tota Ram
- Chaderiya Jhini Re Jhini
- Radha Ke Bina Shyam Adha
- Bhagwan Mere Bhagwan

=== Ghazals and other songs ===
- Chaand Angdaiyaan Le Raha Hai
- Tumhare Shahar Ka Mausam
- Main Nazar Se Pee Raha Hoon
- Hum Se Achi To Kahin Aaine Ki Khismat Hogi
- Mere Kabr Par Pate Huye
- Tum Kya Samjho Tum Kya Jano
- Kategi Ye Zindagi Ab Rote Rote
- Laga Chunari Mein Daag
- La Pila De Saqiya
- Devonix with Kunal Saha
- Hot and Spicy with Sundar Popo

== Tracks ==
Albums	Song	Singer	Composer	Lyricist	Year of release
Unknown	Jai Bholenath, Jai Mahadev	Anup Jalota			2004
Shri Siddhivinayak Aarti	Sindhur Lal Chadhayo	Anup Jalota			2009
Mata Ka Jagrata	Mata Ki Aarti	Anup Jalota & Sanghamitra Bharali		Traditional	2011
Mata Ka Jagrata	Tarse Naina barse Naina	Anup Jalota & Sanghamitra Bharali	Dinesh Kumar Dube	Mohan Sharma	2011
Mata Ka Jagrata	Raat Jagraate Ki Hai	Anup Jalota & Sanghamitra Bharali		Mohan Sharma	2011
Bhajan Sangrah – Lord Hanuman	Sankatmochan Naam Tiharo	Anup Jalota			2016
Bhajan Sandhya, Vol. 16	Suraj Ki Garmi Se	Anup Jalota			2016
Krishna Janmashtami Aayo Re – Best of Lord Krishna Songs 2016	Mukund Madhav Govind Bol	Anup Jalota			2016
51 Essentials Krishna Best of Aarti, Bhajans, Kirtan, Mantras & Shlokas	Govind Bolo Hari Gopal	Anup Jalota			2016
Bhagwan Mere Bhagwan	Bhagwan Mere Bhagwan	Anup Jalota, Soma Ghosh, Sudesh Bhosale, Madhushree & Satyam Anandjee	Satyam Anandjee	Sukhnidhan Mishra	2021

== Filmography ==
=== Films ===
Year	Film	Role	Notes
2019	Rock Star Bini	Guruji	
2021	Satya Sai Baba	Sathya Sai Baba	
2022	Kartoot	Police commissioner	

Television}

=== Television ===
Year	Shows	Role	Notes
2018	Bigg Boss 12	Himself/Contestant	Evicted Day 42
2020	Paatal Lok	Balkishan Bajpayee	
