= Vijay J. Darda =

Indian politician (born 1950)

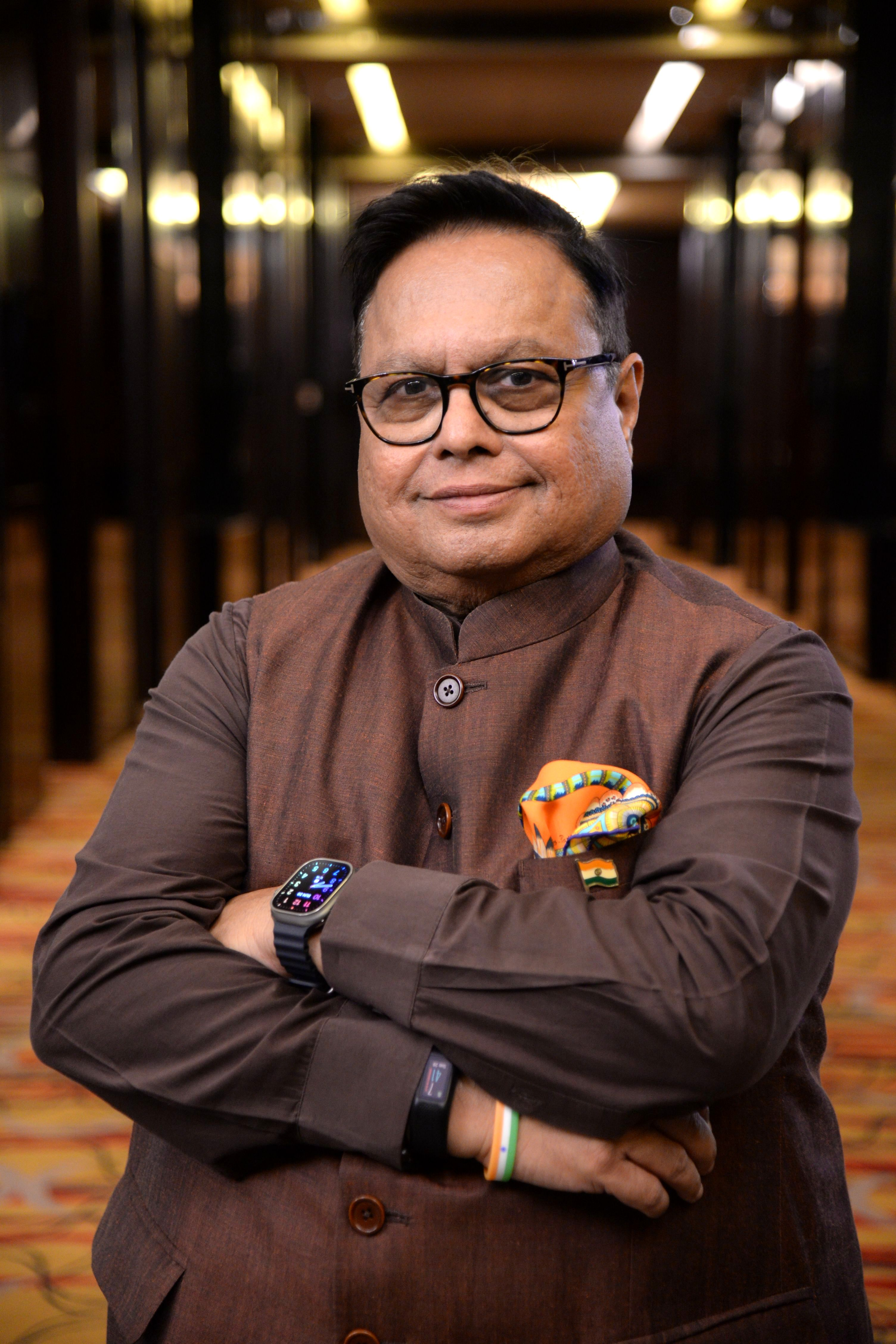

Member of Parliament, Rajya Sabha
- In office (1998-2004), (2004-2010), (2010 – 2016)
- Constituency: Maharashtra

Personal details
- Born: 14 May 1950 (age 76) Yavatmal, Bombay State, (present-day Maharashtra) India
- Party: Indian National Congress
- Spouse: Jyotsna Vijay Darda
- Children: Devendra Darda (son), Purva (daughter)
- Parent(s): Jawaharlal Darda, Veenadevi J. Darda
- Relatives: Rajendra Darda (Brother)
- Profession: Politician, editor
- Website: https://www.vijaydarda.in/

Vijay Jawaharlal Darda (born 14 May 1950) is a politician from Indian National Congress, and was a Member of the Parliament of India representing Maharashtra in the Rajya Sabha since 1998, having been elected for three consecutive terms to the upper house of the Indian Parliament. He is the chairman of the Lokmat Media Group, and the founder and president of Sakal Jain Samaj. Darda was President of the Indian Newspaper Society, New Delhi from 1997 to 1998 and remains a member of its executive committee.

== Early life and political career ==
Darda was born in a Shwetambar Jain Family in Yavatmal. His father, Jawaharlal Darda, was a freedom fighter during the independence struggle of India. Jawaharlal Darda launched Lokmat, a daily Marathi newspaper on 15 December 1971, in Nagpur. Vijay J Darda received a diploma in Journalism and Printing Technology from Mumbai University In 1988. Vijay Darda was awarded D.Litt. (Doctor of Literature) by internationally renowned D Y Patil University at the convocation of the university in Navi Mumbai on 28 March 2023, at the hands of Maharashtra governor Ramesh Bais and chancellor of Dr D Y Patil University Dr Vijay Patil in the presence Maharashtra Chief Minister Eknath Shinde and dignitaries from all walks of life. He was conferred with the degree for his outstanding work across the fields of journalism, social work, education, politics, philanthropy for the betterment of society. he contested his first Rajya Sabha election and won as an independent candidate against the Congress candidate Ram Pradhan. After winning as an independent candidate, Congress party nominated him for the 2004 and 2010 Rajya Sabha elections in which he secured victory.

Darda was elected and served as the chairman of Audit Bureau of Circulation (ABC) for 2010–11.

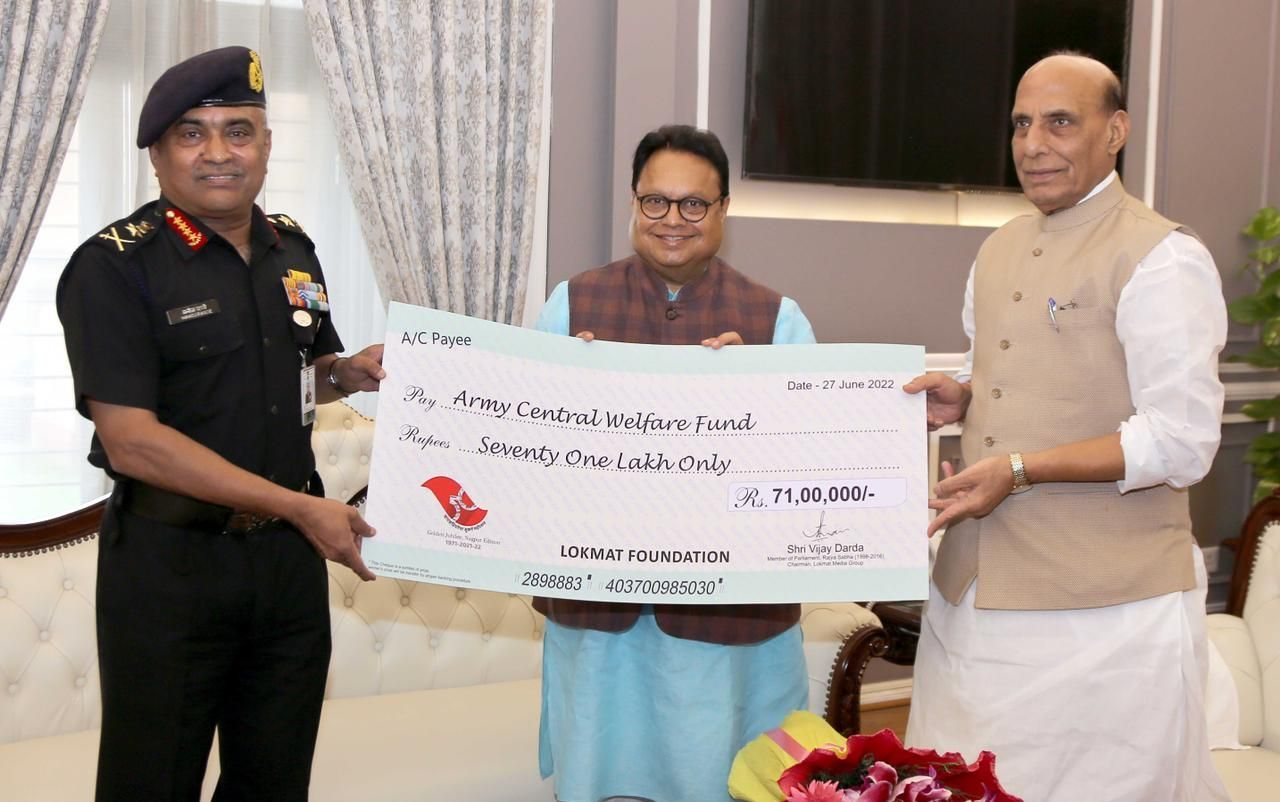
Vijay Darda on 28 June 2022 presented a cheque worth Rs 71 lakh to defence minister of India Rajnath Singh and Chief of Army Staff General Manoj Pande on the construction of houses for the soldiers guarding the War Memorial in Kargil.

Vijay Darda on 28 June 2022 presented a cheque worth Rs 71 lakh to defence minister of India Rajnath Singh and Chief of Army Staff General Manoj Pande on behalf of Lokmat Foundation for the construction of houses for the soldiers guarding the War Memorial in Kargil.

Kargil War Memorial was constructed in Kargil in 2004 on the national highway NH-1D from Srinagar to Leh after the Kargil war victory in 1999. Since this place is very close to the Pakistan border and there is a strong possibility of a terror attack here, an Army contingent has been deployed for its security.

Kargil War Memorial Home for Jawans has been built with contribution from Lokmat Foundation and funds collected from members of the public. The War Memorial Home was dedicated to the jawans by Vijay Darda in presence of Rajendra Darda, Brig U S Anand, Brig B S Multani, Lt Gen Anindya Sengupta and Major General Nagendra Singh at Dras (Ladakh) on 23rd Kargil Vijay Diwas on 26 July 2022.

In 1986, he organised All India Kabaddi Gold Trophy Tournament at Yavatmal to promote the Indian game at an international level.

When the execution of the Wardha-Yavatmal-Nanded railway project was delayed, Darda requested authorities to intervene. On 11 June 2014, he made a demand for a separate state for Vidarbha in Parliament because of the problems that people of the region face. He demanded that the first cargo hub of the country should be set up in Nagpur, which would generate widespread employment and fuel growth and development in the region. He said that the Sewagram Ashram at Wardha should be declared a national heritage structure as it has been witness to the 'satyagraha' and national freedom struggle, the release said. He demanded the government to ensure that there was no interference with the freedom of press.

Darda published a book titled Public Issues Before Parliament that compiles his various contributions as a Member of Parliament. The book was released by then Vice President of India Hamid Ansari.

In 2014, Darda actively highlighted the problems of people in Vidarbha region and urged the centre to create a package of INR 200 crores for widows of farmers who committed suicide, and which supported institutions of higher education in the backward region. An agro-based industry model was suggested by him to create alternate employment opportunities. Darda urged for additional financial incentives to attract more industrial investments to the Vidharbha region.

In 2015, Darda founded Sakal Jain Samaj, not for profit organization aims to preach the teachings of Jainism and organizes events and celebrations.

During the meeting of the Consultative Committee of the Members of Parliament for the Ministry of Civil Aviation, Darda raised issues about the Maharashtra government managing airports. He pointed out that the Maharashtra Govt. has no expertise in maintenance of airports and development of infrastructure, and the condition of the airport is deteriorating due to non-appointment of strategic partner who could make investments for development of the airports.

Darda was part of the Pakistan-India Parliamentarians' Dialogue in Islamabad, Pakistan in 2011. He told the press, "The 26/11 incident is important for India and cannot be considered a closed chapter. The trust deficit can also be bridged if steps are taken to release Sarabjit Singh." Darda also said, "Pakistan will have to act on India's long-standing security concerns, including the handing over of Dawood Ibrahim and the prosecution of those involved in the 2008 Mumbai attack case. Visas should also be issued freely and Pakistan can benefit from India's expertise in areas like healthcare. The two sides also have to address key issues like poverty, education and differences over sharing river waters."

Darda raised issues of wildlife conservation in Parliament.

Darda scrupulously followed up in Rajya Sabha on issues including combating global warming, cleaning of the Yamuna river and depleting forest cover in the country. He also proposed the installation of surveillance systems at national parks to check poaching, as well as to mitigate the illegal trade of leopard skin and body parts.

In an exclusive interview with senior journalists in Nagpur, Mr. Vijay Darda said a strong political will is needed to complete his dream project Wardha -Yavatmal-Nanded railway line on time. Darda said he is pursuing this project constantly for last 13 year. So far, he has discussed the project with eleven Railway Ministers and made correspondence with relevant authorities several times. Darda said, original cost of the project 284 km yellow line was 274.55 crore but the cost has escalated to 3,165 crore now in 2021.

== Publications ==
- Tapsi: Reminiscences of Veenadevi Darda, My Respected Mother: The Indian Emergency as seen by an Indian (English version)
- Lokmat Congress Centenary Special-1985
- Sanskar Pushpa, discourses of Jain Sadhvi Preeti Sudha Ji
- Raktanjali, a book of inspiring poems written by Col. V.P. Singh dedicated to the Kargil Martyrs
- Straight Thoughts
- Na Sampanare Shabda
- Seedhi Baat
- Satyam Shivam Sundaram
- Public Issues Before Parliament
- Ringside
- Kuch Jakhm Kuch Aawaj
- Tya Jakhma To Aawaj
- The Churn

== Family ==
Vijay's brother, Rajendra Darda, was also elected from Aurangabad East Assembly constituency from 1998 thrice. He was the minister of education and industry in Maharashtra Government. Vijay Darda is married to Jyotsna Darda and has two children - Devendra Darda (son) and Purva Darda Kothari (daughter). Jawaharlal Darda, his father, was from Yavatmal district. A freedom fighter, Jawaharlal Darda was also the state treasurer for the MPCC. He was part of the cabinet at as the minister for industries and energy of Maharashtra state.

== South Asia Editor Forum ==
Founder president of the South Asian Editor's Forum, formed by the editors of dailies in South Asia.

== Reception ==
Being a Congress Member, on 29 July 2012, at a function in Ahmedabad, Darda remarked that Gujarat Chief Minister Narendra Modi is a tiger and a national saint.

== Philanthropy ==
Darda is the founder of Shri Jawaharlal Darda Institute of Engineering & Technology at Yavatmal and is the Managing Trustee of Press Institute of Maharashtra, Pune along with Smt. Kusumabai Darda Trust.

Bhari village in the Yavatmal district was adopted by Darda under the Sansad Adarsh Gram Yojana. The village was converted into a model village at a cost of INR 1 crore.

Darda donated INR 5 lakhs to the descendants of Tatya Tope because of the deteriorating condition of the family.

He supported Sultana Begum (great-granddaughter of Bahadur Shah Zafar) with the wedding of her daughter.

Darda has worked towards stopping the slaughterhouses and has interest in wildlife conservation owing to his Jain roots.

In 1984, Darda arranged funds for the people who were impacted by floods in Nanded and Parbhani. School buildings were constructed. He supported the Lokmat Relief Fund during earthquakes of Bihar (1988) and Killari (Latur, Marathwada 1993). Kargil Relief funds were raised by him and the group for the martyrs of Kargil from Aurangabad, Nagpur, Lature and Solapur through which hostels were made.

Vijay Darda has taken an initiative to provide substantial support for higher education to the children of the martyred cops who laid down their lives for maintaining peace in Gadchiroli district and the state. At a programme held at the Gadchiroli police headquarters on 14, December 2022, financial assistance of Rs 50,000 each was given to 20 children

== Social and religious ==
Under the guidance of Shri Vijay Darda, Lokmat Media Group organised a National Inter-Religious Conference in Nagpur on 24 October 2021. Religious and spiritual leaders from different religions participated in this conference and called for communal harmony and universal brotherhood. The religious leaders who graced the conference included Gurudev Sri Sri Ravi Shankar ji, Founder of Art of Living, Swami Ramdev ji, Founder of Patanjali Yogpeeth, Haridwar, Acharya Dr. Lokeshmuni ji, Founder of Ahimsa Vishwa Bharti, Brahmaviharidas Swami ji of BAPS Swaminarayan Sanstha, Cardinal Oswald Gracias ji, Archbishop of Mumbai, Pralhad Wamanrao Pai ji of Jeevanvidya Mission, Mumbai, Bhikkhu Sanghasena, Founder of Mahabodhi International Meditation Centre, Leh and Ladakh and Haji Syed Salman Chishty, Gaddi Nashin, Dargah Ajmer Sharif. The Chief Guest of the programme was Shri Nitin Gadkari, Union Minister for Road Transport & Highways, Government of India and the Guest of Honour was Shri Dayashankar Tiwari, Mayor of Nagpur.

== Awards and recognition ==
- Feroze Gandhi Memorial Award for excellence in Journalism (1990–91)
- International jurists award in UK (2011) given by Rt. Hon. Lord Phillips (President of the Supreme Court of the UK) for work in the field of legal education in India's rural areas
- Giant International Journalism Award (2016) for best contribution in the field of Journalism in Maharashtra, India
- The Best Produced Newspapar for the Best Printing Technology Award by the hand of President of India Shri Giani Zali Singh awarded in 1983.
- Nemichand Shrishrimal Foundation Award for the excellence in the field of Journalism in 1996
- Journalism award 1997 for the best contribution in the field of Journalism in Maharashtra State
- Maharashtra Kala Niketan 7th Maharashtra Cine Natya Paritoshik 2003
- Outstanding Youth Person, 1987, by Indian National Jaycees, Chapter-Yavatmal Cotton City Jaycees
- Ten Outstanding Businessmen, Industrialists & Professionals Award, 2001
- Brijlal Biyani Award for Journalism, 2006
- Yavatmal Bhushan Award 2007, by Yavatmal Rotary Club
- Late S.M. Garge Journalism Award for 2007
- Mahakaruna Award in recognition of contribution to maintaining love & social harmony in society. The award was given the hands of Bhikkhu Sanghasena ji, founder President & Spiritual Director of Mahabodhi International Meditation Centre, Leh (Ladakh)
- Global Peace Award for outstanding leadership and service to the country and humanity during the International Sufi Rang Mahotsav 2022 organised by Chishty Foundation at Ajmer (Rajasthan)
- 'Global Achiever' (Best Politician) award at the World Summit for Global Achievers 2022 ceremony organised at Satyagrah Hall in Raj Ghat, New Delhi,
- Kakasaheb Purandare Award for recognition of his outstanding contributions to journalism.
