= Lokmat =

Indian newspaper

- Lokmat Brand Logo
- Type: Daily newspaper
- Format: Broadsheet
- Owner: Vijay J. Darda
- Founder: Jawaharlal Darda
- Publisher: Lokmat Media Limited
- Editor-in-chief: Rajendra Darda and Vijay J. Darda
- Founded: 15 December 1971; 54 years ago
- Language: Marathi, Hindi, English
- Headquarters: Lokmat Media Ltd, 1301/2, Lodha Supremus, Dr. E. Moses Rd, Worli Circle, Mumbai - 400 018
- Country: India
- Circulation: 692,768 Daily (as of April 2023)
- Readership: 6.28 million (IRS 2019)
- Website: lokmat.com; lokmattimes.com; lokmat.net; lokmatnews.in

Lokmat (lit. 'People's Opinion') is a Marathi-language newspaper published in Maharashtra, India. Founded in 1971 by Jawaharlal Darda, it is the largest read Marathi-language newspaper in India. and has presence in print, digital, TV and events. It is also available in an e-paper format and is published in Hindi and English as Lokmat Samachar and the Lokmat Times respectively. Lokmat Media is one of the largest regional media groups in India and has presence in print, digital, TV and events.

== Television news channel ==
Lokmat extended its media business to broadcast through a 50-50 joint venture with IBN18 Broadcast Limited. The joint venture company, IBN-Lokmat Private Limited (“IBNL”), operates IBN-Lokmat, a 24 x 7 Marathi news and current affairs television channel which went on air on 6 April 2008.

== Controversies ==
=== 2015 ISIS cartoon controversy ===
In 2015, a cartoon published alongside the article "ISIS cha Paisa" (ISIS' money), regarding the funding pattern of terrorist group ISIS, led to violent protests from Muslim groups and attacks on the newspaper's offices in Jalgaon, Dhule, Nandurbar, Malegaon and other locations across Maharashtra. Protestors deemed the cartoon to be "blasphemous". Several complaints were filed with the police regarding the cartoon, and subsequently, an FIR was lodged against the owners, the cartoonist and the editor. The newspaper later published an apology. Police stated that they had increased security at all Lokmat offices across Maharashtra following the attacks.
