= Kanoon (TV series) =

Indian television series

- Genre: Mystery; Crime
- Created by: B. R. Chopra
- Written by: Satish Bhatnagar; Sachin Bhowmik; Kulwant Jain; Hasan Kamal
- Directed by: B. R. Chopra; Ravi Chopra
- Starring: Pankaj Dheer; Ananth Narayan Mahadevan; Gajendra Chauhan; Deep Dhillon; Gufi Paintal; Vinod Kapoor; Virendra Razdan; Surendra Pal; Rupa Ganguly; Navni Parihar; Deepak Parashar
- Country of origin: India
- Original languages: Hindi; Tamil (Dubbed)
- No. of seasons: 4
- No. of episodes: 111

Production
- Producer: B. R. Chopra
- Production location: India
- Cinematography: Dharam Chopra
- Editors: Shailendra Doke; Bhirpal Singh
- Running time: 25 minutes (approx)

Original release
- Network: DD Metro
- Release: 1993 – 1996

Kanoon is an Indian television courtroom drama/crime series. The 111-episode Hindi series had its original run from 1993 to 1996 on DD Metro. It was produced by B. R. Chopra and directed by his son Ravi Chopra. The music was composed by Ravi. Make-up for the series was done by Vimal Devkar. The concept of the story was given by Satish Bhatnagar, Sachin Bhowmik, Kulwant Jain and Hasan Kamal. Four seasons of the show were telecasted.

Each episode ran for approximately 25 minutes and began with a title song rendered by Mahendra Kapoor.

== Summary ==
This TV serial by the Bollywood producer B. R. Chopra is styled after several of the movies he made and named after the famous movie, Kanoon (1960). The protagonist is a lawyer, assisted by a secretary and an assistant. The serial features several crime cases, which run to multiple episodes each.

== Cast ==
=== Main ===
- Pankaj Dheer as Vijay Saxena
- Ananth Narayan Mahadevan as Pasha Polyster
- Vinod Kapoor as Inspector Shakti Singh
- Deep Dhillon as Public Prosecutor Indrajeet Singh
- Kavita Kapoor as Milli

=== Episodewise ===
- Rishabh Shukla as Mr. Mathur
- Rupa Ganguly as Mrs. Mathur
- Dinesh Anand as Sardesh Kumar/Khadir
- Girja Shankar as Caretaker
- Tanya Singh as Caretaker's daughter
- Pushpa Verma as Caretaker's wife
- Raza Murad as Syndicate Boss
- Ali Khan as Damodar
- Zaheer Rizvi as Sonny
- Hanu Rao as Sonny's friend
- Rahul Seth as Sonny's friend
- Gagan Gupta as Sonny's friend
- Gufi Paintal as Justice Raghunath
- Manju Vyas as Mrs. Raghunath
- Nattasha Singh as Dolly Raghunath
- Sumeet as Bunty Raghunath
- Sharat Saxena as Avinash / Inspector Sooraj Singh
- Vishnu Sharma as Police Commissioner
- Rana Jung Bahadur as Rajan
- Deepak Parashar as Deepak Dasgupta
- Dolly Sharma as Mina Dasgupta
- R.S. Chopra as Gyan Dasgupta/Bharadwaj
- Manjushree as Receptionist
- Surendra Pal as Judge
- Deepak Patel as Doctor Tyagi
- Vinod Rawat as Ram Barosan
- G.B. Singh as JK
- Virendra Razdan as Narendra Khanna/Dharampal
- Sanjay Mehendirata as Ajay Sharma/Dr. Jaswant
- Navni Parihar as Ramaa Sharma
- Tushar Dalvi as Prem Kapoor / Rajkishore
- Anita Kulkarni as Nimmi Kapoor / Guddi
- Deepshikha Nagpal as Maggie
- Alisha as Rebecca
- Anwar Fatehan as Pande
- Kaushal Kapoor as Drunkard
- Pramod Kapoor as Peter
- Chandrakant Pandya as Govardandas
- Dharmesh Tiwari as Judge
- Amita Nagia as Mrs. Jaswant
- Mamik Singh as Dr. Satish Khanna
- Ram Mohan as Dr. Sampath
- Kapil Kumar as Dr. Karan/Sundar
- Sujata Mehta as Rani
- Kavita Vaid as Rani’s maid
- Prithvi as Rani’s neighbour
- Brij Gopal as Paanwala
- Dharam Soni as Dr. Bhattacharya
- Jeetu Arora as Banarasilal
- Gajendra Chouhan as Chandra Saxena
- Phalguni Parikh as Mrs. Rashmi Saxena
- Shagufta Ali as Suzy Decosta/Mehtab
- Deepak Jethi as Peter (Suzy's boyfriend)/Darpan
- Balvinder as Randhir
- Jagruti as Natasha
- Mangala Duggal as Bamaa
- Shirazi as Manager Khatkar
- Kunickaa Sadanand Lal as Gayathri
- Bharat Kapoor as JD
- Smita Siddharth as Miss Rita/JD's Secretary
- Jagdish Raj as Judge
- Raju Shrivastav as Car broker
- Deepak Patil as Virendar
- Mulraj Rajda as Giridharilal Khanna
- Manjeet Kullar as Rashmi
- Jharna Dave as Mrs. Chandra Saxena
- Vijay Saini as Shankar
- Imtiaz Khan as JK
- Pradeep Singh Rawat as Chandu/JK's henchman
- Shiva Rindani as Shankar Mukherjee
- Pankaj Berry as Narender Khanna
- Rajesh Khera as Prem Shankar

== Episodes ==
Episode No.	Episode Name	Actors/Actresses	Character Played	Plot
1-10	Accident - Part 1-10	Rishabh Shukla; Rupa Ganguly	Mr. Mathur; Mrs. Mathur	A man who loses his memory in an accident asks lawyer Vijay Saxena for help in restoring his memory.
11-19	Aulaad - Part 1-9	Tushar Dalvi; Dharmesh Tiwari	Raj Kishore; Judge	Inspector Shakti Singh's mother asks Vijay Saxena to defend and exonerate the man who is accused of killing her daughter.
20-28	Bekasoor - Part 1-9	Dinesh Anand; Mulraj Rajda	Sardesh Kumar; Giridharilal Khanna	Vikram Saxena narrates the incidents relating to his first case wherein a retired judge asks his help in reopening a case so that an innocent man's life can be saved.
29-36	Beti - Part 1-8	Girja Shankar; Tanya Singh; Pushpa Verma; Raza Murad; Ali Khan; Zaheer Rizvi; Hanu Rao; Rahul Seth; Gagan Gupta	Caretaker; Caretaker's daughter Caretaker's wife Syndicate Boss; Damodar; Sonny; Sonny's friend Sonny's friend Sonny's friend	Vikram Saxena defends a tribal leader for murder of an underworld don's son in revenge for the rape of his daughter by the don's son.
37-42	Judge Saab - Part 1-6	Gufi Paintal; Manju Vyas; Nattasha Singh; Sumeet; Sharat Saxena; Vishnu Sharma; Anita Kulkarni	Justice Raghunath; Mrs. Raghunath; Dolly Raghunath; Bunty Raghunath; Avinash; Police Commissioner; Dolly's friend	Vijay Saxena defends a judge accused of murdering a man who was sentenced to life imprisonment by the judge himself.
43-47	Bewafa - Part 1-5	Sharat Saxena	Inspector Sooraj Singh	An inspector accused of murdering his wife asks Vijay Saxena for help in proving his innocence.
48-52	Blackmail - Part 1-5	Rana Jung Bahadur; Deepak Parashar; Dolly Sharma; R.S. Chopra; Manjushree; Surendra Pal; Deepak Patel; Vinod Rawat; G.B. Singh	Rajan; Deepak Dasgupta; Mina Dasgupta; Gyan Dasgupta; Receptionist; Judge; Doctor Tyagi; Ram Barosan; JK	A woman accused of killing her first husband and the woman's present husband both ask Vijay Saxena for help in exonerating her.
53-58	Faraar - Part 1-6	Pankaj Berry	Narendra Khanna	Vijay Saxena defends a man accused of killing his sister.
59-68	Gunaah - Part 1-10	Sanjay Mehendirata; Navni Parihar; R.S. Chopra; Tushar Dalvi; Anita Kulkarni; Deepshika; Alisha; Anwar Fatehan; Kaushal Kapoor; Promod Kapoor; Chandrakant Pandya; Dharmesh Tiwari	Ajay Sharma; Ramaa Sharma; Bharadwaj/Ramaa's father Prem Kapoor; Nimmi Kapoor/Guddi; Maggie; Rebecca; Pande; Drunkard; Peter; Govardandas; Judge	A man looking for a companion in the absence of his wife is accused of murder and comes to Vijay Saxena for help.
69-74	Khamoshi - Part 1-6	Sanjay Mehendirata; Amita Nagia; Mamik Singh; Ram Mohan; Kapil Kumar; Sujata Mehta; Kavita Vaid; Dinesh Anand; Prithvi; Surendra Pal; Brij Gopal; Dharam Soni; Jeetu Arora; Gufi Paintal	Jaswant; Dr. Sathish Khanna; Dr. Sampath; Dr. Karan; Rani; Rani’s maid Khadir; Rani’s neighbour Judge; Paanwala; Dr. Bhattacharya; Banarasilal; Justice Raghunath	A doctor requests Vijay Saxena's help in exonerating a close friend of his.
75-87	Bhabhi - Part 1-13	Gajendra Chouhan; Phalguni Parikh; Virendra Razdan; Shagufta Ali; Deepak Jethi; Balvinder; Jagruti; Mangala Duggal; Shirazi; Bharat Kapoor; Smita Siddharth; Jagdish Raj; Raju Shrivastave; Deepak Patil	Chandra Saxena; Mrs. Rashmi Saxena; Dharampal/Rashmi's father Suzy Decosta/Mehtab; Peter/Suzy's boyfriend Randhir; Natasha; Bamaa/Rashmi's maid Manager Khatkar; JD; Miss Rita/JD's Secretary; Judge; Car broker Virendar	Vijay Saxena's brother is murdered and Vijay's sister-in-law is the prime accused in the murder.
88-95	Khudkushi - Part 1-8	Kunickaa Sadanand Lal; Deepak Jethi; Kapil Kumar; Mulraj Rajda; Dharmesh Tiwari; Imtiaz Khan	Gayathri; Darpan; Sundar; Giridharilal Khanna; Judge; JK	An ex-college mate asks Vijay Saxena to help defend her when she is accused of killing her husband.
96-111	Zindagi - Part 1-16	Mulraj Rajda; Manjit Kular; Gajendra Chouhan; Jharna Dave; Vijay Saini; Imtiaz Khan; Pradeep Singh Rawat; Dharmesh Tiwari	Giridharilal Khanna; Rashmi; Chandra Saxena; Mrs. Chandra Saxena; Shankar; JK; Chandu/JK's henchman Judge	Vijay Saxena seeks to bring to justice the man who killed his wife.

== Other crew ==
- B.R. Chopra and Ravi Chopra, Directors
- Anand Bhalla, Associate director
- Vishal Desai, Seema Pillai, Dinesh Sharma, Ramesh Sharma and Yogesh Singh, Assistant directors
- R.K. Sibal, Second assistant director
- Sunil Mahajan, Chief accountant
- Patil B.P., Accountant
- Suresh Devadiga, Action assistant
- Shakoor Pathan, Action director
- Bharat, Art department
- Raju Gawda, Laxman, Paras Naik, Ram Narayan, Narayan Palekar, Ramu, Santosh and Shanker, Art department
- Y.L. Bagchi, Jaidev and Madhu Pandey, Art direction
- Romaldo Fernandes, Godfrey Gonsalves, Sachin Kurhade and Arun Naik, Assistant editor
- Chandra Kamal, Surya Kamal and Vinay Kamal, Assistant music editor
- Raj Chopra and Ramesh Jain, Assistant producer
- Dharam Chopra, Director of photography
- Pratap Chowdhary, First assistant camera
- Ashish Mukherjee, Mohan Prajapat, Bharat Sovani and Narayan Rao, Camera operator
- A. Karim, Chief technician
- Aniket Rangnekar, Tech advisor
- Tony Banks, Computer graphics
- Vandana Punjabi, Prinay Singh and Navin Suchitta, Computer graphics
- Paulomi Bhattacharya, Costume coordinator
- Mohan Kasardekar, Vishnu Patil and Prabhakar Pawar, Costumer
- Shailendra Doke and Birpal Singh, Editing
- Jumbo & Narsing, Equipment incharge
- Vimal Devkar, Hair stylist
- Ravi, Music director
- Mahendra Kapoor, Title music
- Ramesh Rathod, Re-recording mixer
- Kulwant Jain, Lyrics / dialogue editor
- Chaman Kundal, Vinayak Morajkar and Shyam Raut, Makeup artist
- B.R. Vyas, Office coordinator
- Kishore Malhotra, Production manager
- Ramesh Palekar, Production assistant
- Suresh, Production boys
- Birju, Ramesh Joshi, Manuel and Sushil, Production design
- Satish Bhatnagar, Sachin Bhowmik, Kulwant Jain and Hasan Kamal, Screenplay
- Ganesh, Hiraji, Isaq, Kashinath, Kishore, Patil, Rafiq, Sanjiva and Sheku, Set decoration
- Chandu Patil, Gurudas Patil, Pravin Patil, Shafiq, Sunil Vengurlekar and Swapnil Vengurlekar, Sound assistant
- Arbind Sinha, Stills
- Mohan Kudu, Stills assistant
- Suresh Devadiga, Stunt assistant
- Anil, Dutta, Purushottam, Sachin, Somanth, Sunil and Yuvraj, Video unit

== See also ==
- Mahabharat (1988 TV series)
