= Ghaath (2000 film) =

Indian Bollywood crime drama film

- Directed by: Akashdeep Sabir
- Written by: Akashdeep Sabir
- Produced by: Kumar Mohan; Atul Mohan (co-producer)
- Starring: Manoj Bajpayee; Tabu; Om Puri; Arshad Warsi; Irrfan Khan; Sheeba
- Cinematography: Surendra M. Rao
- Edited by: Aseem Sinha
- Music by: Anu Malik (Songs); Salim–Sulaiman (Background score)
- Production company: K. Bhagyalaxmi Pictures
- Distributed by: B4U Films
- Release date: 8 December 2000 (India)
- Country: India
- Language: Hindi

Ghaath is a 2000 Indian Hindi-language crime drama film directed by Akashdeep Sabir and produced by Kumar Mohan. The film stars Manoj Bajpayee, Tabu and Om Puri in pivotal roles and Raveena Tandon in a special appearance.

== Plot ==
Krishna Patil aspires to become a police officer and impresses Ajay Pandey of the Police Academy. However, a local gangster, Romesh Bhagwat Dogra, alias Maamu, does not want him to pass the academy and has him disqualified. Enraged by this, Patil drinks heavily and is arrested after a scuffle with Ishwar Mohanlal Godbole, a corrupt cop for whom "police" is an acronym for Power, Order, Liar, Income, Corrupt and Encounter. It is only when Patil's father bribes him does Godbole release him. Patil becomes disillusioned with the system in general. One day he meets Kavita Chaudhary, a young, beautiful, intelligent and successful lawyer who had recently lost her father and shares Patil's view of the system. Patil and Kavita enter into a relationship.

Godbole arrests Patil and tortures him in police lockup. Godbole is about to encounter Patil but Kavita saves him using her wit. Kavita brings a badly injured Patil to her home that night and helps him heal his wounds. Patil makes love to Kavita and impregnates her.

Patil's sister Mansi marries Divakar. Soon after their marriage, the couple dies when their building collapses. The building was constructed by Maamu, who had Municipal Officer Khairnar killed after he refused to hush up the inquiry. Patil learns of this and, together with Kavita and his friends, battles Maamu. In the end Patil dies fighting Maamu and his goons while pregnant Kavita goes ahead and decides to give birth his child.

== Cast ==
- Manoj Bajpayee as Krishna Patil
- Tabu as Kavita Chaudhary
- Om Puri as Inspector Ajay Pandey
- Aparna Bhatnagar as Suman Ajay Pandey
- Anupam Kher as Ramakant Patil
- Arshad Warsi as Divakar , Journalist and Mansi's husband and Krishna's sister
- Sheeba as Mansi Patil
- Mukesh Tiwari as Ishwar Mohanlal Godbole
- Irrfan Khan as Romesh Bhagwat Dogra alias Maamu
- Johnny Lever as Screwdriver
- Makarand Deshpande as Happy Singh
- Kamlesh Oza as Vipul
- Mehul Buch as Hiten
- Sachin Khedekar as Khairnar
- Tinnu Anand as Vilas Rao
- Raveena Tandon in a special appearance in "Baba Meri Ye Jawani"
- Narayani Shastri as Varsha Khainar (Khainar's daughter)
- Raju Mavani as Salim Hatela
- Daya Shankar Pandey as Maamu's Goon

== Production ==
Akashdeep directed the film, produced under the banner of K. Bhagyalakshmi Pictures. This was the first film in which Khan and Kher appeared together. Initially, Akashdeep was not pleased with Khan's acting and was planning to replace him. It was on the insistence of Bajpayee that Akashdeep retained him. Bajpayee was acting with Khan for the first time, so was Tabu. Raveena Tandon made a special appearance in the film.

== Soundtrack ==
The music for the soundtrack is composed by Anu Malik excepting one instrumental track by Salim–Sulaiman, who also provided the background score. Lyrics are written by Sameer.

#	Title	Singer(s)
1	"Baba Meri Ye Jawani"	Falguni Pathak, Sapna Awasthi
2	"Hum Bhi Samajh Rahe Hain"	Hariharan, Alka Yagnik
3	"Jo Dar Gaya Woh Mar Gaya"	Shaan, KK, Anu Malik
4	"Jhumka Chandi Da"	Udit Narayan, Sonu Nigam, Alka Yagnik, Jaspinder Narula
5	"Teri Aashiqui"	Pankaj Udhas, Alka Yagnik
6	"Teri Yeh Jawani"	Udit Narayan, Sapna Awasthi
7	"Kisi Ne Sach Hi Kaha"	Shabbir Kumar, Om Puri, Tabu, Manoj Bajpai, Karsan Sagathiya
8	"The colors of Ghaath"	Salim–Sulaiman

Ronjita Das of Rediff.com opined that the film's music had "nothing to remember". Rashtriya Sahara called the soundtrack "excellent". Sify found the music "grating".

== Reception ==
In her review for Rediff.com, Ronjita Das called the film a replay of Shool (1999), a previous film of Bajpayee, and noted that Johnny Lever had been totally wasted. Sify likened the film to a "routine commercial potboiler" and noted that the "production values aren't too high". It felt that Bajpayee had overacted in certain places and Tabu fell "prey to the mediocrity of the script". A review in Rashtriya Sahara noted that the film's cast was "represented by an impressive line-up of reputed actors".

According to the Indian film trade website Box Office India, the film was made at an estimated budget of ₹3.75 crore (US$390,000) and had a worldwide gross of ₹3.92 crore (US$410,000), earning the label "disaster".
