= Gajendra Chauhan =

Indian actor

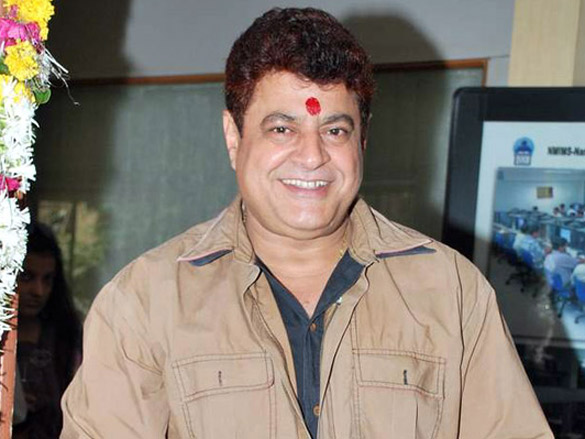
- Chauhan in 2010
- Born: 10 October 1956 (age 69); Delhi, India
- Education: AIIMS New Delhi
- Occupation: Actor
- Years active: 1984–present
- Political party: Bharatiya Janta Party
- Spouse: Habiba Rehman
- Children: 1

Gajendra Singh Chauhan known professionally as Gajendra Chauhan, is a former television actor known for his work on Indian television, especially his portrayal of Yudhishthira in the historical television series Mahabharat (1988–90). He has also had significant roles in a few B movies, and a larger number of cameo appearances in other films. In 2015, he was appointed chairman of the Film and Television Institute of India (FTII), which sparked controversy and opposition by FTII students, leading to his resignation in October 2017. He was the Vice-Chancellor of Dada Lakhmi Chand State University of Performing and Visual Arts from 2021 to 2025.

== Early life and family ==
Gajendra was born on 10 October 1956, in Delhi to a Rajput family. He did a diploma in radiography from AIIMS New Delhi, before he moved to Mumbai to pursue a career in acting. There he studied acting in the school run by Roshan Taneja, who had previously taught at FTII.

Chauhan is married to Bollywood choreographer Habiba Rehman. They have a son, Shamsher Singh Chauhan.

== Acting career ==
Chauhan's acting career spans over 35 years, and by his own count, he has worked in 600 television series and almost 150 movies during that period. His first break as an actor was in television series Paying Guest in 1983, and he went on to act in shows such as Rajni, Air Hostess and Adalat. The first acting part in a film that he did was in Main Chup Nahi Rahoongi in 1986. In reviews of his film career, Times of India and Firstpost wrote that he had played significant roles only in a few "C-grade" movies, with most of his other roles being cameo appearances, a few of which were in mainstream movie.

=== Mahabharat ===
Chauhan was initially offered to play the role of Lord Krishna in the television series, and shot for two episodes of the series in this role. However filming for the first series was delayed, and Chauhan moved south to take on new work. Upon his return, Chauhan had put on weight and was considered unsuitable for the role of Krishna. He was later offered the role of Yudhishthira, which went on to being the role he has become better known by.

== Administration and politics ==
Chauhan has also been involved in the administration of Cinema and Television Artists Association for 20 years, and served as its president for a year. In 2004 Chauhan entered politics, and became a member of the Bharatiya Janata Party (BJP), for which he has worked as the national convener for culture.

== Controversies ==
On 9 June 2015, Chauhan was appointed as the Chairman of the Film and Television Institute of India (FTII). His appointment proved to be controversial amid allegations by students that it was a blatant attempt to "saffronize the institute". A section of left-wing students association, including All India Students Association (AISA) (the student wing of the Communist Party of India (Marxist–Leninist) Liberation) continue to agitate. Chauhan requested the students to give him a year to prove himself, and insisted that he would be better than the previous chairpersons.

Among those who have supported Chauhan's appointment as FTII chairman are BJP supporters and politicians including Mukesh Khanna, Paresh Rawal, Hema Malini, Rajyavardhan Singh Rathore, and Paintal. Many more including FTII alumni and former teachers, actors, film technicians, filmmakers, journalists and political leaders have opposed his appointment, prominent among whom include Rishi Kapoor, Resul Pookutty, Amol Palekar, Soumitra Chatterjee,Arvind Kejriwal and Rana Ayyub.

== Filmography ==
=== Film ===
Year	Title	Role	Notes
1985	Main Chup Nahi Rahungi		
1985	Lallu Ram	Sub Inspector	
1986	Jungle Love		
1989	Khuli Khidki	Avinash	
1989	Awara Zindagi		
1989	Ajeeb Itefaq	Singer	Guest role
1991	Vasna		
1991	Dancer	Joshi	
1991	Jungle Ki Rani		
1991	Naagmani		
1992	Jungle Ka Beta		
1992	Jawani Janeman		
1992	Dilwale Kabhi Na Hare	Shibu	
1993	Aakanksha	Vinod Pandey	
1993	Mulaquat	Balraj	
1993	Khoon Ka Sindoor	Minister Ashwini Kumar	
1994	Watan		
1994	Jai Maa Vaishno Devi		
1994	Pathreela Raasta		
1994	Janam Se Pehle		
1994	Vaade Iraade		
1994	Mohini	Gandharv	
1994	Sone Ki Sita		
1994	Aao Pyaar Karen	Suraj	
1995	Hum Sab Chor Hain	Police Commissioner	
1995	Kaala Sach		
1995	Reshma		
1996	Himmatvar	Inspector Patil	
1997	Uff! Yeh Mohabbat	Umang Usgaonkar	
1997	Vishwavidhaata	Mukesh Mathur	
1997	Dharma Karma	Police Inspector	
1997	Police Station		
1997	Bhayaanak Panja		
1999	International Khiladi	Rahul's Father	
1999	Inteqam Aurat Ka		
1999	Hogi Pyaar Ki Jeet	Arjun Singh	
1999	Dil Ka Sauda		
2000	Billa No. 786	Virendra Singh (Pinky's dad)	
2000	Aaj Ka Ravan	ACP Rathod	
2000	Tapish		
2000	Saamri		
2000	Mechanic Mamaiah (Telugu)		
2000	Yeh Hai Prem Janjaal		
2001	Rupa Rani Ramkali		
2001	Gumnam Hai Koi	Vinod Kumar Tripathi	
2001	Arjun Devaa	Virendra Choudhry	
2002	Tumko Na Bhool Paayenge	Ex-Armyman	
2002	Devar Ji		Bhojpuri film
2003	Andaaz	Mr. Sahay	
2003	Parwana	Ganesh fest dancer/singer	
2003	Baghban	Car salesman	
2004	Pati Ho To Aisa		
2005	Dhadkanein	Ravi Malhotra	
2005	Barsaat	Arav's Father	
2006	Mere Jeevan Saathi		
2010	Isi Life Mein	Nareshchand	
2011	Elaan		
2012	Nakshatra	Sharma	
2013	Mahabharat Aur Barbareek	Yudhisthra	
2014	Kahin Hai Mera Pyar	Priya's father	
2016	1920: London	Tantrik Baba	
2018	Ik Onkar	Chief Minister	
2019	Maa Purnagiri		
2019	Gunwali Dulhaniya	Mr. Rathore	
2022	Sher Gujjar	Narayan; Ravinder's father	
2022	Antaryatri Mahapurush- The Walking God	Mallappa Ji	
2024	695		

== Television ==
Year	Serial	Role	Channel	Notes
1986	Bahadur Shah Zafar	Tatya Tope (Episode 8 & Episode 9)	DD National	
1989–1990	Mahabharat	Maharaj Yudhishthir	DD National	
1993	Kanoon	Chandra Saxena	DD Metro	14 episodes
1994–2001	Zee Horror Show	1994 Saaya 11 Episodes/1995 Aatma 4 Episodes/1996 Jaal 6 Episodes/1998 Junoon 3 Episodes/ 1999 Vapsi 2 Episodes/Murti 3 Episodes/2000 Raat 2 Episodes.	Zee TV	
1997	Ghar Jamai	Sidhu Singh	Zee TV	Special Appearance only in Episode no 20
1997	Om Namah Shivay	Daksha Prajapati/Maharaj Karthaveeryarjun		
2000	Shree Ganesh	Parvat Raj Himalay		
2000	Noorjahan		DD National	
2001	Aane Wala Pal		DD Metro	
2001	Dushman		DD Metro	
2001	Jaane Anjaane	Prannath Vashisht	DD National	
2002	Ramayan	Dasharath	Zee TV	
2005–2006	Sarkarr:Rishton Ki Ankahi Kahani		Zee TV	
2007	Meri Doli Tere Angana	Mahendra	Zee TV	
2007–2008	Raavan	Maharaj Dasharath	Zee TV	
2008–2009	Naaginn	Naagdev	Zee TV	
2012	Shobha Somnath Ki		Zee TV	
2012	Kya Hua Tera Vaada	Mr. Chopra	Sony Entertainment Television	
2013	Adaalat	Colonel Desai & Justice Sharma	Sony Entertainment Television	
2017	Sankatmochan Mahabali Hanuman	Sumant	Sony Entertainment Television	
2018	Danga The Riot	Shyama Prasad Mukherjee		
