= Mr. Bond (film) =

1992 film by Raj Sippy

Mr Bond
- Film poster
- Directed by: Raj N. Sippy
- Written by: Iqbal Durrani
- Story by: Mohinder Ashish
- Produced by: Keshu Ramsay
- Starring: Akshay Kumar; Sheeba; Pankaj Dheer; Ruchika Pandey
- Cinematography: S. Pappu
- Edited by: V. N. Mayekar
- Music by: Anand Milind
- Production company: DMS Films
- Release date: 24 April 1992
- Running time: 127 min
- Language: Hindi

Mr. Bond is a 1992 Indian Hindi action film directed by Raj Sippy released on 24 April 1992. It stars Akshay Kumar, Sheeba, Ruchika Pandey, Vaishali Sood, making her debut and Pankaj Dheer, and was written by Iqbal Durrani.

== Plot ==
Mr. Bond is a dedicated police officer of Bombay's police. He was assigned to a mission to save the children victims of child trafficking. Those small children were abducted and held as hostages by the underworld don Dragon.

== Cast ==
- Akshay Kumar as Bond
- Sheeba Akashdeep Sabir as Sunita
- Saathi Ganguly as Julie
- Ruchika Pandey as Neelam
- Pankaj Dheer as Dragon / Daga
- Mac Mohan as Mac
- Dolly Minhas as Sushma
- Vaishali Sood as Anuja

== Soundtrack ==
#	Title	Singer(s)	Lyricist(s)
1	"Meri Jane Jana Mere Paas To Aao"	Anand Chitragupt, Anuradha Paudwal	Sameer Anjaan
2	"Jab Do Dil Milte Hain"	Mohammad Aziz, Anuradha Paudwal	Majrooh Sultanpuri
3	"Wada Karen Chalo Le Lein Kasam"	Abhijeet, Anuradha Paudwal	Sameer Anjaan
4	"Chhod De Pyare Kal Ki Fikar"	Amit Kumar, Anuradha Paudwal	Sameer Anjaan
5	"O Mere Jaanam"	Anuradha Paudwal	Sameer Anjaan
6	"Baadal Garje Bijli Chamke"	Mohammad Aziz, Anuradha Paudwal	Anand Bakshi
7	"Mehbooba Mehbooba"	Shabbir Kumar	Sameer Anjaan
8	"Asha Nirasha To Jeevan Mein"	Anuradha Paudwal	Sameer Anjaan
9	"Handsome Man, Jab Se Dekha To"	Anuradha Paudwal, Annette Pinto	Sameer Anjaan
