= Pankaj Dheer =

Indian actor (1956–2025)

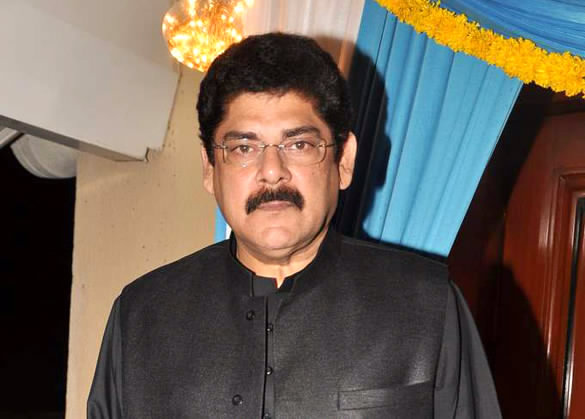
- Dheer in 2011
- Born: 9 November 1956; Punjab, India
- Died: 15 October 2025 (aged 68); Mumbai, Maharashtra, India
- Occupation: Actor
- Years active: 1970–2025
- Spouse: Anita Dheer (m. 1979)
- Children: Nikitin Dheer
- Relatives: Kratika Sengar (daughter-in-law)

Pankaj Dheer (9 November 1956 – 15 October 2025) was an Indian actor who appeared in Hindi films and television. He was known for his great role of Karna in the television series Mahabharat and roles in Chandrakanta, The Great Maratha, Yug and Badho Bahu. He appeared in several Hindi films in small roles, including Sadak, Soldier, Baadshah and Taarzan: The Wonder Car.

== Career ==
Dheer began his on-screen career in the film Poonam in 1981, which did poorly at the box office. He then played roles in several small films, until he got his big break, appearing in B. R. Chopra's epic television series Mahabharat, as Karna. He was originally cast as Arjuna, but got the role of Karna due to his refusal to shave off his moustache.

The role of Karna was the highlight of Dheer's career and made him a household name in India. His pictures were used in textbooks as reference to Karna and his statues are worshipped as Karna in temples in Karnal and Bastar. He became a much sought-after actor for both television and movies after his success in Mahabharat.

He appeared as the lead in debut episode Dastak of horror anthology TV series Zee Horror Show (1993), along with Archana Puran Singh. He also played the lead as a defence lawyer in the TV Series Kanoon, a series based on court-room dramas. He appeared as Hussain in the 1993 action film Pardesi. He starred as the lead character of King Shivdutt in fantasy TV series Chandrakanta in 1994.

He performed versatile supporting character roles in Hindi movies such as Soldier, Andaaz, Baadshah and Tumko Na Bhool Paayenge. He appeared as Police Inspector Malik in the 1995 action film Nishana. He collaborated with Vishnuvardhan and appeared as a supporting actor in Kannada movies such as Vishnu Vijaya, Appaji and Vishnu Sena.

In 2006 Dheer established a shooting studio, Visage Studioz along with his brother Satluj Dheer at Jogeshwari, Mumbai. In 2010, he opened Abbhinnay Acting Academy in Mumbai, with actor Gufi Paintal as the faculty head. He directed the romantic comedy-drama film My Father Godfather in 2014.

In 2011 he appeared in the Zee TV historical drama series Shobha Somnath Ki. Between 2012 and 2014, he played the recurring role of Maharaj Himavan in the Mythological TV series Devon Ke Dev...Mahadev. He reprised the role of Karna in the 2013 movie, Mahabharat Aur Barbareek, which also had appearances from several actors of the original 1989 Mahabharat TV series. In 2015 he portrayed Anand Kapoor in the Sony TV soap opera Dil Ki Baatein Dil Hi Jaane and appeared in the Zee TV drama series Doli Armaano Ki. In 2016 he appeared in Life OK drama TV series Rishton Ka Saudagar – Baazigar. He played the role of a wrestler, Ganga Singh Ahlawat, in romantic drama TV series Badho Bahu. He played the role of Barrister D'Costa in the ZEE5 crime thriller web series Poison in 2019, which was his last performance in a web series.

He played the double role of Ravindra Singh Bagga and Gyaneshwar Singh in drama TV series Ajooni in 2022–23. In his last television appearance, he played the role of Giriraj in the Sci-fi Fantasy series Dhruv Tara – Samay Sadi Se Pare in 2024.

== Personal life and death ==
Pankaj Dheer was born on 9 November 1956 in Punjab, India. Dheer had a son, Nikitin Dheer, who is also an actor. Nikitin is married to actress Kratika Sengar.

Pankaj Dheer died from cancer on 15 October 2025, at the age of 68. A funeral was held and he was cremated at Pawan Hans Crematorium in the Vile Parle West area of Mumbai. Salman Khan, Sidharth Malhotra, Firoz Khan and several other actors paid their last respects.

== Filmography ==
=== As director ===
| Year | Title | Ref. |
|---|---|---|
| 2014 | My Father Godfather | |

=== As actor ===
==== Film ====
| Year | Title | Role(s) | Notes | Ref. |
|---|---|---|---|---|
| 1981 | Poonam | Girija | | |
| 1983 | Sookha | | | |
| 1983 | Bekhabar | | | |
| 1987 | Meraa Suhaag | | | |
| 1990 | Randam Varavu | DIG Vishnu IPS | Malayalam film | |
| 1990 | Jeevan Ek Sanghursh | Mahesh Dholakia | | |
| 1991 | Saugandh | Thakur Ranveer Singh | | |
| 1991 | Sanam Bewafa | Zuber Khan | | |
| 1991 | Sadak | Inspector Irani | | |
| 1991 | Majboor Ladki | | | |
| 1992 | Mr. Bond | Dragon / Daga | | |
| 1992 | Jaagruti | Custom Officer Vishal | | |
| 1993 | Pardesi | Hussian | | |
| 1993 | Aashik Awara | Ranveer | | |
| 1993 | Ashaant | Amit | | |
| 1994 | Ikke Pe Ikka | Randhir | | |
| 1995 | Nishana | Police Commissioner Mallik | | |
| 1996 | Appaji | Arjun | Kannada Film | |
| 1998 | Soldier | Vijay Malhotra | | |
| 1999 | Baadshah | Chief Security Officer Khanna | | |
| 2002 | Tumko Na Bhool Paayenge | Shivpratap Singh | | |
| 2003 | Om | Mr. Dhariwal | | |
| 2003 | Andaaz | Professor Rohit Malhotra | | |
| 2003 | Zameen | Captain Basheer Ali | | |
| 2004 | Taarzan: The Wonder Car | Rakesh Kapoor | | |
| 2005 | Vishnu Sena | DCP Samarjith singh | Kannada Film | |
| 2006 | Sarhad Paar | Suraj | | |
| 2013 | Gippi | Papaji | | |
| 2013 | Mahabharat Aur Barbareek | Karna | | |
| 2016 | Kaptaan | Dhillon | Punjabi Film | |

==== Television ====
| Year | Serial | Role | Ref. |
|---|---|---|---|
| 1988–1990 | Mahabharata | Karna | |
| 1993 | Zee Horror Show | Monty | |
| 1993 | Kanoon | Vijay Saxena | |
| 1994–1996 | Chandrakanta | Raja Shivdutt | |
| 1994 | The Great Maratha | Sadashivrao Bhau | |
| 1997 | Yug | Ali Khan | |
| 1997–1998 | Mahabharat Katha | Karna | |
| 1999 | Rishtey | Dayashankar | |
| 2004–2005 | Kamini Damini | Kamini's husband | |
| 2008–2009 | Teen Bahuraaniyaan | Dwarkadas | |
| 2008–2010 | Raja Ki Aayegi Baraat | Mr. Sisodia "Raja Sahab" | |
| 2010 | Rang Badalti Odhani | Sarpanch | |
| 2011–2012 | Sasural Simar Ka | Jamnalal Dwivedi | |
| 2011 | Shobha Somnath Ki | Kirit Chalukya | |
| 2012–2014 | Devon Ke Dev...Mahadev | Maharaj Himavan | |
| 2012 | Savdhaan India | Gurubaksh | |
| 2015 | Dil Ki Baatein Dil Hi Jaane | Anand Kapoor | |
| 2015 | Doli Armaano Ki | Mr. Jaamdar | |
| 2016 | Rishton Ka Saudagar – Baazigar | Kailashnath Trivedi | |
| 2016–2018 | Badho Bahu | Ganga Singh Ahlawat | |
| 2019 | Poison | Barrister D'Costa | |
| 2022–2023 | Ajooni | Ravindra Singh Bagga, Gyaneshwar Singh | |
| 2024 | Dhruv Tara – Samay Sadi Se Pare | Giriraj | |
