= Share bazaar =

Share bazaar may refer to:

- Bombay Stock Exchange
- National Stock Exchange of India
- Share Bazaar (film), a 1997 Bollywood film
