= Baba Sehgal =

Indian rapper (born 1965)

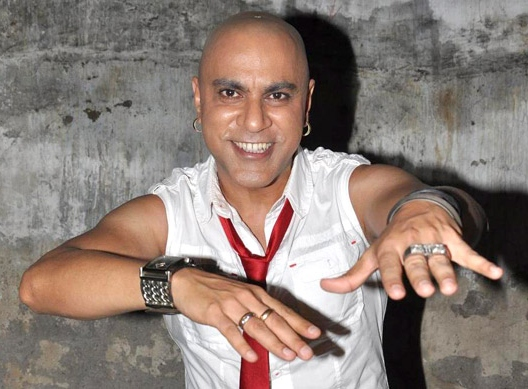
- Baba Sehgal at a photoshoot promoting his album Mumbai City

Background information
- Born: Harjeet Singh Sehgal; 23 November 1965 (age 60); Lucknow, Uttar Pradesh, India
- Genres: Hip hop, Indipop
- Occupations: Singer, rapper, actor
- Years active: 1990–present

Harjeet Singh "Baba" Sehgal is an Indian rapper. He is widely acclaimed to be the first successful Indian rapper. He is also involved in various other areas of the entertainment industry and works across media in several different languages. He was a contestant in the reality show Bigg Boss in 2006.

== Early life ==
Born and raised in Lucknow, Sehgal graduated with a B.Tech. from G. B. Pant University of Agriculture and Technology, Pantnagar.

== Career ==
His entertainment career began in the 1990s, when he emerged as part of the Indipop scene, and released an album which got frequent airplay on MTV India. Since then he has been a popular figure on the rap scene, with hits such as "Thanda Thanda Paani" (which sampled Vanilla Ice's "Ice Ice Baby", which in turn sampled Queen's "Under Pressure"), "Manjula" and "Dil Dhadke".

Sehgal's first album was Dilruba (1990), followed by Alibaba (1991). Then came his biggest hit album Thanda Thanda Pani (1992), which sold 5 million cassettes, making it the first successful Indian hip-hop album.

His next albums were Main Bhi Madonna (1993), Baba Bachao Na (1993), Dr. Dhingra (1994), Miss 420 (1994), Double Gadbad (1994), Indian Romyo (1995), Tora Tora (1995), Loomba Loomba (1996), Na Aariya Hai Na Jariya Hai (1997), America Mein Indian Dhaba (1997), D.J. Mix Blue (1997), Hak Dhak Dil in Culcutta (1997), A Reason to Smile (1997), Meri Jaan Hindustan (1998), Jugni Mast Kalandar (1998), Abb Mein Vengaboy (1999), Pinga Pinga (2001), Pump up your Style (2003), Welcome to Mumbai (2005), Babe Di Gaddi (2009), Woh Beete Din and The Magic of Dandiya, among others. He writes the majority of the music for his albums himself. He was the music director of the movie Dance Party (1995), featuring the popular song "Kapurthala Se Aaya Hoon", "Tere Liye Laaya Hoon", "Orange Kurta Peela Pajama". He was the first Indian artist to have a music video broadcast on MTV Asia, which was broadcasting out of Hong Kong at the time. He was also the presenter of the TV show Superhit Muqabla which was aired on DD2 at primetime. He has also worked as a stage performer.

He was in New York from 2001 to 2005. When he came home to Mumbai, he released his album Welcome to Mumbai, which was his 22nd album.

He also directed the music for the Bollywood films Bhoot Unkle (2006) and Nalaik (2005). He also anchored the TV show Santa and Banta News Unlimited on Zoom. In 2012, he released the song, "Praji Kunjam Kunjam Control", which aimed to raise awareness against female infanticide and support the "Save The Girl Child" campaign. His next song "Mumbai City" was a dark hip-hop song, centered on the street culture of Mumbai. His song "Trump Ka Mania" supporting the then-Republican nominee Donald Trump was a hit. Now, he makes and releases his singles on his YouTube channel Baba Sehgal Entertainment. Some of them are "Aloo ka Parantha", "Going to the Gym", "Swacchh Bharat".

In January 2024, Sehgal came up with his own version of "O Mere Dil Ke Chain", originally sung by Kishore Kumar.

=== Acting ===
In 1998, Sehgal made his acting debut in the Bollywood film Miss 420 alongside Sheeba Akashdeep. He also sang four songs for the film's soundtrack which was released in 1994, four years before the film's theatrical release. In 1999, he played dual roles in the television film Double Gadbad. He was a contestant on the first season of Bigg Boss 1 in 2006. In 2009, he had a part in the SAB TV comedy series Jugni Chali Jalandhar. In 2011, he appeared in the drama serial Rang Badalti Odhani on Star One. Sehgal also made his Telugu film debut in Rudhramadevi, with Anushka Shetty in the lead. It was directed by National award winner Gunasekhar. Baba Sehgal was signed to play a major negative role in another Telugu film titled Overdose. In 2016, he featured in a cameo appearance as himself in Bank Chor, and also contributed to the soundtrack of the film. In the same year, he made his debut in Tamil cinema playing the role of a corrupt cop in the film Achcham Yenbadhu Madamaiyada.

== Filmography ==
- Helicopter Eela (2018)
- Bank Chor (2017) as himself
- Achcham Enbadhu Madamaiyada (2016)
- Sahasam Swasaga Sagipo (2016)
- Rudramadevi (2015)
- My Friend Ganesha 3 (2010)
- Miss 420 (1998) as Vicky

=== Television ===
Year	Title	Role	Notes
1992	Superhit Muqabla	Anchor	
1996	Top 10	Khare	
1999	Double Gadbad	Vijay Johny Mendes	Television film
2006	CID	Himself	Episodes: "Killer Whistle Part I and II"
2006–2007	Bigg Boss 1	Contestant	
2009–2010	Jugni Chali Jalandhar	Balwinder	
2011	Rang Badalti Odhani	Bhai	
2016	Soadies	Sodhi	
2019	Bhoot Purva	Yamraj	

== Discography ==
=== Telugu ===
- Rikshavodu (1995) - "Roop Tera Mastana"
- Jalsa (2008) - "Jalsa"
- Arya 2 (2009)
- Adhurs (2010)
- Don Seenu (2010)
- Mr. Perfect (2011)
- Ragada (2010)
- Gabbar Singh (2012) - "Dekho Dekho Gabbar"
- Shadow (2013)
- Om 3D (2013)
- Action 3D (2013)
- Adda (2013)
- Alludu Seenu (2014)
- Sankarabharanam (2015)
- Pelli SandaD (2021)
- Paarijatha Parvam (2024)
- Swag (2024)
- Mana Shankara Vara Prasad Garu (2026)

=== Hindi ===
- Roja (Hindi version) (1992)
- Hum Hain Bemisaal (1994)
- Miss 420 (1998)
- Bhoot Unkle (2006) (also music director)
- 13B (2009)
- Bank Chor (2017) (one song)

=== Kannada ===
- Gajakesari (2014)

=== Tamil ===
Year	Film	Song name	Composer	Co-singer(s)
2009	Villu	"Jalsa Jalsa" & (Remix)	Devi Sri Prasad	Devi Sri Prasad, Rita
2010	Singam	"Kadhal Vandhale"	Devi Sri Prasad	Priyadharshini
2011	Osthe	"Osthe Maamey"	S. Thaman	Ranjith, Rahul Nambiar, Naveen
2012	Muppozhudhum Un Karpanaigal	"Sokku Podi"	G. V. Prakash Kumar	Shruti Haasan
2012	Saguni	"Vella Bambaram"	G. V. Prakash Kumar	Priya Himesh
2013	Alex Pandian	"Bad Boy"	Devi Sri Prasad	Priya Himesh
2013	Singam II	"Singam Dance"	Devi Sri Prasad	Devi Sri Prasad, Anuradha Sriram

=== Bengali ===
Year	Film	Song name	Composer	Co-singer(s)
2013	Khiladi	"Heartbeat"	Shree Pritam	Saberi Bhattacharya

=== Studio albums ===
- Dilruba (1990)
- Alibaba (1991)
- Thanda Thanda Pani (1992)
- Main Bhi Madonna (1993)
- Dr. Dhingra (1994)
- Miss 420 (1994)
- Double Gadbad (1995)
- Miss Loomba Loomba (1996)
- Na Aariya Hai Na Jariya Hai (1997)
- America Mein Indian Dhaba (1998)
- Abb Main Vengaboy (1999)
- Tora Tora (2000)
- Pump Up Your Style (2003)
- Baba Sehgal: Greatest Hits
