= Shadow of Love =

Shadow of Love may refer to:

- "The Shadow of Love", a song by the Damned (1985)
- "Shadow of Love", a song by Laura Branigan from Touch (1987)
- "Shadow of Love", a song by Quiet Riot from Guilty Pleasures (2001)
- "Shadow of Love", a song by Celine Dion from Taking Chances (2007)
- Pyaar Ka Saaya (lit. 'Shadow of Love'), a 1991 Indian Hindi-language film
