= To B or Not to B =

To B or No to B
- Film poster
- Directed by: Vierendrra Lalit
- Written by: Sanjeev Tiwari; Rakesh Chaturvedi
- Produced by: JV Manisha; Tarsem Antil; Anil Rastogi
- Starring: Rahul Roy; Trivikram Mattoo; Akansha Shivhare; Vivek Srivastava
- Music by: Ishwar
- Production company: Harikrit Films
- Country: India

To B or Not To B is an unreleased Indian psycho-social thriller film directed by Vierendrra Lalit and starring Rahul Roy, Trivikram Mattoo, Akansha Shivhare, Vivek Srivastava in the lead roles. To B or Not to B is a psychological drama with heavy focus on the unstable emotional states of characters, in combination with mystery and thriller. The story and dialogues and the screenplay are written by Sanjeev Tiwari and Rakesh Chaturvedi. The film is produced by JV Manisha, Tarsem Antil & Dr. Anil Rastogi under the Harikrit Films banner.

== Plot ==
It’s around the festival of Holi, a couple are on their way to their Farm house, located in a remote hilly jungle. It’s raining, little dark and as they are about to reach the destination, they find frequent police barriers. The atmosphere seems to be tensed. The couple Nikhil, age 38 and Priya, age 26, are married since Five years and marriage is in somewhat, the Difficult stage. They do not have any Children. So this involuntary childlessness has given a way for the Stage of Grief which is infesting their Life with Denial, Despair, Remorse, Anger, Fear and Physical Grief and what not. In order to give a last chance to their incorrigible relationship, they are on a short trip to their Farm House. At their Farm House, when both are alone, they hear the knock on the door. Both are surprised to see an intruder, asking for shelter. After If’s and But’s, Nikhil allows him to stay...though Priya disagrees!!!...

== Cast ==
- Rahul Roy as Nikhil
- Trivikram Mattoo as Shakespeare/ Pratush
- Akansha Shivhare as Priya
- Vivek Srivastava as Ramdas

== Filming ==
The film was shot in Delhi and Morni Hills, Panchkula, Haryana at various locations.

== Post production ==
Post production work is on at Harikrit Films Studios, New Delhi.
