= College Girl =

College Girl may refer to:

- College Girl (1960 film), a 1960 Indian Hindi romantic family film
- College Girl (1974 film), a 1974 Indian Malayalam film
- College Girl (1978 film), a 1978 Indian Hindi film
- College Girl (1990 film), a 1990 Indian Hindi film
- College Girl Novels, a subgenre current in the late 19th and early 20th centuries (see Daddy-Long-Legs (novel))
