= Amita Nangia =

Indian Actress

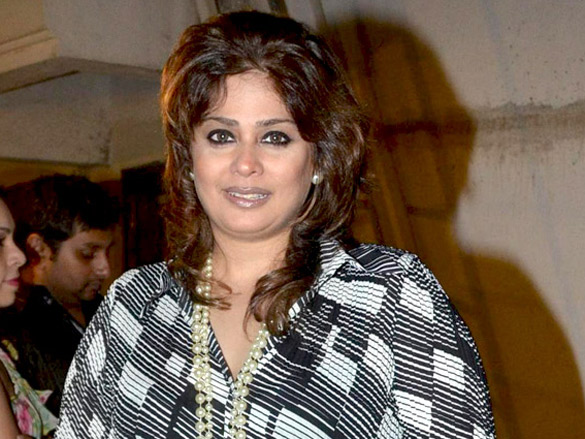
- Born: New Delhi, India
- Occupation: Actress
- Spouse: Sanjay Bansal

Amita Nangia (also known as Ameeta Nangia) is a TV actress in Bollywood. Her initial popularity was from her role as Sheena in the very famous TV serial Tara, in Season 2 broadcast on Zee TV in 1993. She has acted in Bollywood Horror movies like Purani Haveli and College Girl. She was a sorcerer in the Indian mystery and thriller show, Kaal Bhairav Rahasya. She is also remembered for the role of Radhika in the tele-serial Hum Paanch.

== Filmography ==
1. Balma Mora Banka (1988) Bhojpuri film
2. Purani Haveli (1989)
3. Ghabrahat (1989)
4. College Girl (1990)
5. Pathar Ke Insan (1990)
6. Paap Ki Kamaee (1990)
7. Baaghi (1990)
8. Jeevan Daata (1991)
9. Saugandh (1991)
10. Afsana Pyar Ka (1991)
11. Pratigyabadh (1991)
12. Ranbhoomi (1991)
13. Dastoor (1991)
14. Jeena Teri Gali Mein (1991)
15. Pratikar (1991)
16. Yaara Dildara (1991) as Madhavi aka Madhu
17. Hatyarin (1991) as Reshma
18. Inspector Dhanush (1991)
19. Rupaye Dus Karod (1991)
20. Sanam Tere Hain Hum (1992)
21. Zulm Ki Hukumat (1992)
22. Ghar Jamai (1992) as Suman
23. Giraft (1992)
24. Geetanjali (1993)
25. Ishq Aur Inteqaam (1993)
26. Hum Hain Kamaal Ke (1993)
27. Aakhri Chetawani (1993)
28. Baali Umar Ko Salaam (1994)
29. Gangster(1995)
30. Raja (1995)
31. Diya Aur Toofan (1995)
32. Angrakshak (1995)
33. Fauji (1995)
34. Zulm Hi Zulm (1996)
35. Namak (1996)
36. Dil Ke Jharoke Main (1997)
37. Suche Moti (1998) Punjabi film
38. Miss 420 (1998)
39. Ajnabee (2001)
40. Chup Chup Ke (2006)
41. Bhagam Bhag (2006)
42. Khatta Meetha (2010)
43. Rajnandini (2021)

== Television ==
Year	Serial	Role	Notes
1993-97	Tara	Sheena Pratap Singh	Recurring role
1994	Tehkikaat	Anjali Rao	
1994	Ajnabi		
1995	Hum Paanch	Radhika Mathur	
2001	Aane Wala Pal		
2009	Jhansi Ki Rani	Lacchobai	Recurring role
2012-13	Sukanya Hamari Betiyaa	Shakuntala	
