= Bhayaanak Panja =

1997 film

- Directed by: Rajesh Mittal
- Produced by: Rajesh Mittal
- Starring: Gajendra Chauhan; Anil Dhawan; Menaka; Tina Ghai; Sreepradha; Bharat Kapoor; Kumar Rajesh; Birbal; Nirmala
- Production company: Nirmala Movietone
- Release date: August 16, 1997
- Country: India
- Language: Hindi

Bhayaanak Panja (Dangerous Claw) is a Hindi horror film of Bollywood directed and produced by Rajesh Mittal. The film was released on 16 August 1997 under the banner of Nirmala Movietone.

== Plot ==
Thakur Vikram Sing, local landlord resides in his haveli (bungalow) in remote village Raigarh. One day he is murdered mysteriously in his haveli. A newspaper editor sends a group of reporters to the haunted bungalow to cover the murder story and investigation. While staying at this place they face an evil murderous ghost.

== Cast ==
- Gajendra Chauhan
- Anil Dhawan
- Menaka (actress)
- Tina Ghai
- Sreepradha
- Bharat Kapoor
- Kumar Rajesh
- Birbal
- Nirmala
