= Nishana (1995 film) =

- Compact disc cover
- निशाना
- Directed by: Raj N. Sippy
- Written by: Raju Saigal (script), Anwar Khan (dialogues)
- Produced by: Narendra Bajaj
- Starring: Mithun Chakraborty; Rekha; Paresh Rawal; Pankaj Dheer; Raza Murad; Shafi Inamdar; Aparajita
- Cinematography: S. Pappu
- Edited by: Prashant Khedekar, Vinod Nayak
- Music by: Jatin–Lalit
- Production company: Siddhi Vinayak Creations
- Release date: 17 February 1995
- Running time: 135 min.
- Language: Hindi

Nishana is a 1995 Hindi-language Indian action film directed by Raj N. Sippy and produced by Narendra Bajaj, starring Mithun Chakraborty, Rekha, Paresh Rawal, Pankaj Dheer, Raza Murad, Shafi Inamdar and Aparajita.

== Plot ==
Drug smuggling brings a lot of money to a high-ranking official, and he is willing to do anything to cover up his crimes. One of his victims is Inspector Vijay of the police. However, Vijay's young son has survived and has important evidence against the criminal. Now, he is a target for a new assassination attempt, along with his aunt, Inspector Vijay's sister, Bharti. In her struggle for survival, she must rely on her own strength, but a friend unexpectedly appears to protect her from the bullet.

== Cast ==
- Mithun Chakraborty as Police Inspector Suraj
- Rekha as Bharati
- Paresh Rawal as Chheda
- Pankaj Dheer as Police Commissioner Mallik
- Raza Murad as Minister Dharamdas
- Shafi Inamdar as Police Inspector Vijay
- Adi Irani as Police Inspector Sachin
- Puneet Issar as Durjan
- Mangal Dhillon as Corrupt Police Inspector, Durjan Associate
- Aparajita Bhushan as Mrs Malik
- Gurbachan Singh as Shera's Henchmen
- Aloka Mukherjee as Vijay's wife

== Soundtrack ==
#	Title	Singer	Length
1.	"Samane Baithi Raho"	Kumar Sanu, Alka Yagnik	06:06
2.	"Pyar Hi Pyar Hai"	Kumar Sanu, Alka Yagnik	05:00
3.	"Hamesha Muskurate Rahenge"	Sadhana Sargam, Shweta Pandit	04:30
4.	"Aankhon Mein Aansoo"	Alka Yagnik	05:45
5.	"Bali Haari"	Arun Bakshi, Poornima	05:35
