= JV Manisha =

Indian writer

JV Manisha Bajaj
- Born: JV Manisha Bajaj; 19 September 1967 (age 58); New Delhi,
- Education: Delhi University, Delhi
- Occupations: Actor, producer, writer, poet
- Years active: 1989–present

JV Manisha Bajaj is an Indian writer and filmmaker best known for initiating subjective poetry programs on Indian television.

== Early life and education ==
Manisha was born in New Delhi on 19 September 1967 to Geeta and Janardan Prasad Verma. She has one sibling, Monika Akhaury. Manisha wrote her first poem at age nine about starvation. She attended Prayag Sangeet Samiti and Delhi University, and participated in Kavi sammelan and Doordarshan programs during her studies. She also acted in plays, often in the lead role, and attended poetry recitals.

== Career ==
Manisha's career began with professional poetry recitals. She later joined Doordarshan as an announcer and acted as part of the main cast in a number of telefilms and serials. She has also worked for IGNOU, NDTV, Live India, SAB TV, and Sanskar TV. As a national poet, she performed from the Lal Quila. Manisha's social work career began in 2001 and she has since written for a number of newspapers and journals about social issues like inter-caste marriage. She has also published books, including Yug Yatra (2013), on social topics. In 2013, Manisha established Saanjhi Saanjh, the first national newspaper dedicated to senior citizens, though it was short-lived due to legal formalities.

In 2005, she started a filmmaking company with Tarsem Antil. Since then, she has scripted and produced many films, documentaries, promotions, and advertisements. She wrote the lyrics for the film To B or Not to B. In 2013, she was producing the film Page No. 217 in Fiji.

Manisha has won awards including the Srijan Samman Karm, Shri Bhopal Arishth Mdu, Rohtak Vyavharik Adhyatm "Vaibhav" National Institute of Value Education, and Best Short Film Award 2012 RMAI.

== Personal life ==
Manisha married Devender Kumar Bajaj in 1993. The couple have two sons, Pancham and Paawan.
