= Mahabharat Aur Barbareek =

Mahabharat aur Barabareek
- Film poster
- Directed by: Dharmesh Tiwari
- Produced by: KK Yadav
- Starring: Nitish Bharadwaj; Gajendra Chauhan; Praveen Kumar; Arjun; Rupa Ganguly; Puneet Issar; Vinod Kapoor; Pankaj Dheer; Hema Malini; Jeetendra; Shahbaz Khan; Gracy Singh
- Music by: Ravindra Jain
- Release date: 1 February 2013 (India)
- Running time: 137 minutes
- Country: India
- Language: Hindi

Mahabharat Aur Barbareek is a 2013 Indian Hindi language film directed by Dharmesh Tiwari starring Amit Rao Jeetendra as Barbarika, Bhima's grandson through Ghatotkacha. It is the last film that Dharmesh Tiwari starred in. It is based on the story of Barbarika, who had enough power to turn the tide of the battle any way he wanted. Several of the original cast members from B. R. Chopra's 1988 television adaptation of the Mahabharata also appeared in this film.

== Plot ==
Centered around the Mahabharata narrative, the story is set during the Pandavas' exile and the film features the grandson of Bhima and Hidimbi, Barbarika, who is also known as Lord Shyam and Shyam Baba by Lord Krishna. The film follows Barbarika, who possesses a powerful astra called the 'Teen Baan' (three infallible arrows). This astra had the potential to overwhelm whichever side Barbarika chose to confront. The story culminates in the sacrifice Barbarika eventually makes for the greater good.

== Cast ==
- Nitish Bharadwaj as Krishna
- Gajendra Chauhan as Yudhisthra
- Praveen Kumar as Bhima
- Arjun as Arjuna
- Sanjeev Chitre as Nakula
- Roopa Ganguly as Draupadi
- Puneet Issar as Duryodhana
- Vinod Kapoor as Dushasana
- Pankaj Dheer as Karna
- Shahbaz Khan as Ghatotkacha
- Hema Malini as Hidimbi
- Gufi Paintal as Shakuni
- Surendra Pal as Drona
- Adarsh Gautam as Shiva
- Vindu Dara Singh as Hanuman
- Gracy Singh as Mauravi
- Dharmesh Tiwari as Narada
- Amit Rao Jeetendra as Barbarika
