= Majhdhaar =

- Film poster
- Directed by: Esmayeel Shroff
- Written by: Salim Khan
- Produced by: Pravin Thakkar
- Starring: Salman Khan; Manisha Koirala; Rahul Roy
- Cinematography: Pramod Mithal
- Edited by: A. R. Rajendran
- Music by: Nadeem-Shravan
- Release date: 29 March 1996
- Running time: 140 minutes
- Country: India
- Language: Hindi
- Budget: ₹ 1.50 crore
- Box office: ₹ 49.68 lakh

Majhdhaar is a 1996 Indian Hindi-language drama film directed by Esmayeel Shroff. The film stars Salman Khan, Manisha Koirala and Rahul Roy. The film was a box office failure.

== Plot ==
The movie starts with Krishna talking to Shanti while he receives a letter and then realizes he is late and must be leaving to meet someone, he then reaches a house and sees Gopal on his deathbed, and Gopal goes into a flashback. This story is about three childhood best friends: Krishna, Radha and Gopal (an orphan). Krishna and Radha are in love, Gopal loves Radha. Gopal goes to earn and become financially strong so that on his return, he can marry Radha, meanwhile when Gopal is gone, Krishna and Radha get involved in an intimate relationship, which results in Radha getting pregnant. Then Gopal returns to Radha's life. Radha, who is still in love with Krishna, is unable to express her feelings about Krishna to Gopal. Circumstances become favorable for Gopal and he succeeds in marrying Radha, and subsequently, Radha gives birth to a baby girl, Shanti (Krishna's child). Radha, feeling guilty, leaves Shanti with Gopal (who thinks Shanti is his daughter) and returns to her father's house. Later Radha attempts suicide by jumping into a river but fails; caught by the police, they keep her under their supervision. Gopal gets to know where she is and comes to meet Radha, Radha tells Gopal that she loved Krishna and Shanti is Krishna's daughter. Gopal breaks down and says that everything will be alright. He makes his Will and hands over Shanti to Krishna, her biological father with a letter saying that he is going away. Gopal also decides to give all his wealth to Shanti along with the divorce papers thus setting Radha free from this relationship so that she can live her life the way she wants. Gopal then goes away onto a ship. Back to the future, elderly Gopal lying on the bed meets Krishna and says he just wanted to meet Krishna once as his death was near. Gopal then dies. Krishna then discloses to his daughter that years ago the night when Gopal left, Radha went to an Ashram leaving everyone, to spend the rest of her life there and the letter that Krishna received the other day said that Radha had died.

== Cast ==
- Salman Khan as Gopal
- Rahul Roy as Krishna
- Manisha Koirala as Radha
- Rajeev Verma as Rai Sahib
- Raj Babbar as Mohan
- Malvika Tiwari as Shanti
- Mukesh Rawal
- Sunil Shinde

== Soundtrack ==
The music for this film was composed by the duo Nadeem–Shravan. The song "Ae Mere Dost Dosti Ki Kasam" was originally composed for the 1993 film Do Kadam which starred Salman Khan, Divya Bharti, Karisma Kapoor but the film was later shelved.

Majhdhaar (Original Motion Picture Soundtrack)

#	Song	Singer
1.	"Aye Mere Dost Dosti Ki Kasam" (Part 1)	S. P. Balasubrahmanyam
2.	"Main Is Se Mohabbat Karta Hoon"	Alka Yagnik, Udit Narayan, Mohammed Aziz
3.	"Aye Mere Dost Dosti Ki Kasam" (Part 2)	S. P. Balasubrahmanyam, Kumar Sanu
4.	"Hamne Khamoshi Se Tumhen" (Female)	Alka Yagnik
5.	"Tararam Tararam Tararam Pa"	S. P. Balasubrahmanyam
6.	"Saagar Se Gehra Hai Pyar Hamara"	S. P. Balasubrahmanyam, Alka Yagnik
7.	"Aye Mere Dost Dosti Ki Kasam" (Part 3)	S. P. Balasubrahmanyam, Kumar Sanu
8.	"Hamne Khamoshi Se Tumhen" (Male)	Pankaj Udhas
9.	"Tujhko Meri Yaad Bahut Tadpayegi"	Vinod Rathod
10.	"Kya Zamana Aa Gaya"	Kumar Sanu, Udit Narayan
