= Mazaa Mazaa =

- Theatrical release poster
- Directed by: T. L. V. Prasad
- Written by: Anoop Srivastav
- Produced by: Ramesh K Doshi
- Cinematography: Shankar Naidu
- Music by: Arun Daga
- Production company: Shagun Film Creations
- Release date: 15 July 2005
- Country: India
- Language: Hindi

Mazaa Mazaa is a 2005 Hindi comedy-drama film about a 15-year-old girl whose wish to become an adult comes true.

== Plot ==
A young girl wishes she were a grown woman. The next day, by magic, her wish is granted.

== Cast ==
- Payal Rohatgi
- Farid Amiri
- Vishwajeet Pradhan
- Pankaj Berry
- Tej Sapru

== Music ==
1. Mazaa Mazaa – Shreya Ghoshal
2. Akhh – Mohini Singh
3. Akhh (Remix) – Arun Daga, Sonu Kakkar
4. Dance Dance (aaye Jawanee Aaye) – Sunidhi Chauhan, Arun Daga
5. Dil Hain Darwesho Kee Mehandee – Sonu Kakkar, Arun Daga
6. Dil Me Kyon Aaise – Arun Daga, Shreya Ghoshal
