= Jeena Teri Gali Mein =

- Directed by: Tinnu Anand
- Written by: Ranbir Pushp
- Produced by: Gulshan Kumar
- Starring: Amita Nangia; Kavita Kapoor
- Music by: Babul Bose
- Distributed by: Super Cassettes Industries Pvt. Ltd.
- Release date: 6 May 1991
- Country: India
- Language: Hindi

Jeena Teri Gali Mein is an Indian musical romantic film directed by Tinnu Anand and produced by Gulshan Kumar. It stars Kavita Kapoor, Amita Nangia, Archana Puran Singh and Kunika.

== Cast ==
- Kavita Kapoor
- Suraj
- Amita Nangia
- Archana Puran Singh
- Kunickaa Sadanand
- Dinesh Kaushik

== Soundtrack ==
The music of the album was composed by Babul Bose and the lyrics were written by Ravinder Rawal and Naqsh Lyallpuri (one song, "Mildi Naseeban Naal"). All the songs were sung by Anuradha Paudwal along with Kumar Sanu, S. P. Balasubrahmanyam, Mohammed Aziz, Udit Narayan, Nitin Mukesh and Debashish Dasgupta.

Song	Singer	Raga
"Jeena Teri Gali Mein"	Anuradha Paudwal, S. P. Balasubrahmanyam	
"Tere Hum Ae Sanam"	Anuradha Paudwal, Kumar Sanu	Bhairavi (Hindustani)
"Jaate Ho Pardes Piya"	Anuradha Paudwal, Nitin Mukesh	
"Aa Pyar Ke Rang Bharen"	Anuradha Paudwal, Mohammed Aziz	
"Tumse Hamara Vada Hai Hamdam"	Anuradha Paudwal, Udit Narayan	
"Meri Jindari Tere Haathon Mein"	Anuradha Paudwal, Mohammed Aziz	
"Aaj Is Rut Mein"	Anuradha Paudwal, Kumar Sanu	
"Jeevan Ek Samundar Hai"	Anuradha Paudwal, Nitin Mukesh	
"Mildi Naseeban Naal Mohabbat"	Anuradha Paudwal, Debashish Dasgupta	
