= Walk (2023 film) =

Indian social drama film

- Directed by: Nitin Kumar Gupta
- Starring: Rahul Roy; Archana Puran Singh
- Release date: 2023
- Country: India
- Language: Hindi

Walk is a 2023 Indian Hindi-language social drama film directed by Nitin Kumar Gupta, starring Rahul Roy and Archana Puran Singh. The film portrays the struggles of migrant workers during India's COVID-19 pandemic lockdown and marks Roy's comeback to cinema after his recovery from a brain stroke.

== Plot ==
The film depicts the hardships faced by migrant workers during the nationwide COVID-19 lockdown in India, focusing on their mass exodus as they were forced to walk hundreds of kilometers to their native places during the pandemic.

== Cast ==
- Rahul Roy
- Archana Puran Singh

== Production ==
The film was shot during India's pandemic lockdown period, making it one of the few features to be produced during this time. The production faced unique challenges due to the COVID-19 restrictions and protocols.

== See also ==
- Impact of the COVID-19 pandemic on cinema
- Indian migrant workers during the COVID-19 pandemic
