= Archana Puran Singh =

Indian actress, television personality, and YouTuber (born 1962)

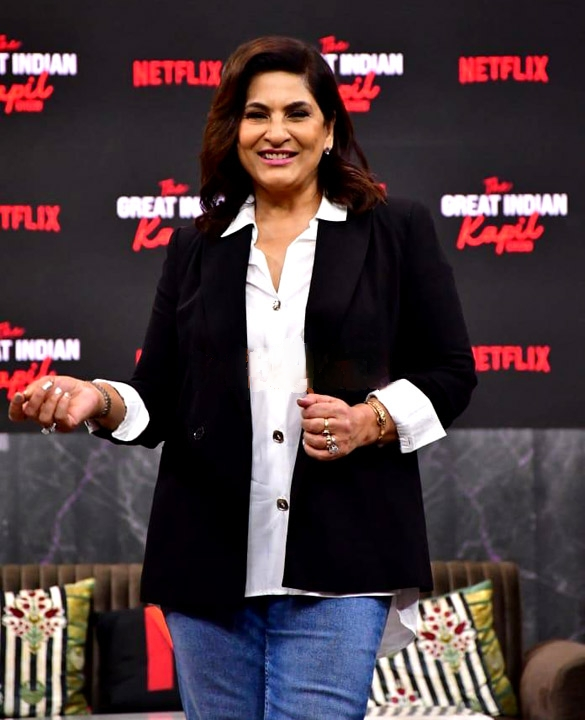
- Singh in 2024
- Born: 26 September 1962 (age 64); Dehradun, Uttarakhand, India
- Education: Lady Shri Ram College (B.A)
- Occupations: Actress; television personality; Youtuber
- Years active: 1982–present
- Spouse: Parmeet Sethi (m. 1992)
- Children: Aaryamann Sethi; Ayushmaan Sethi

YouTube information
- Channel: Archana Puran Singh
- Years active: Dec 12, 2024-present
- Subscribers: 1.32m
- Views: 678m
- Last updated: 13 September 2026

Archana Puran Singh (born 26 September 1962) is an Indian actress and television personality. She is known for her comedy roles in several Hindi films and as a judge in the comedy shows The Kapil Sharma Show and Comedy Circus. She is widely remembered for her supporting roles in several films, best known for playing Miss Braganza in the romance Kuch Kuch Hota Hai (1998). Archana Puran Singh has been featured in more than 100 films and television series.

== Early life ==
Archana Puran Singh is a Rajput. She was born in Dehradun to Chaudhary Puran Singh, an affluent lawyer who had represented Sanjay Gandhi in 1975-1977 Emergency in India related cases, but did not want his children to become lawyers as he believed this profession sometimes required compromise with own conscience while representing the clients. She is the third among the four siblings.

After she completed her 1st to 11th at Convent of Jesus and Mary, Dehradun, she went on to Lady Shri Ram College in Delhi to study literature where she stayed in the college hostel. After she finished college, her father coincidentally connected to his old friends in Mumbai for reasons unrelated to movies, but series of events saw Archana moving to Mumbai in a paying guest house where she stayed for four years with Mitali Mukherjee - wife of singer Bhupinder Singh.

== Career ==
=== In films ===
She made her film debut with Nikaah in 1982 at the age of 20. In 1987, she starred in Jalwa opposite Naseeruddin Shah. Later, she did roles in films like Agneepath (1990), Saudagar (1991), Shola aur Shabnam (1992), Aashiq Awara (1993), and Raja Hindustani (1996); she did a special dance appearance in films like the Govinda-starrer thriller Baaz and the Suniel Shetty starrer Judge Mujrim.

Thereafter, the industry has largely relegated her to supporting roles in Hindi films, often in comedies. Some of her films are Love Story 2050, Mohabbatein, Krrish, Kuch Kuch Hota Hai, Masti, De Dana Dan and Bol Bachchan. She reprised her role as Mrs. Braganza from Kuch Kuch Hota Hai in the Netflix film Nadaaniyan. She further starred in another Netflix film, Toaster.

=== In television ===
Archana's first TV show was the weekly sitcom Mr Ya Mrs, aired on Sundays in the year 1985 on the government-owned channel Doordarshan. She played a working woman in it, with Jayant Kriplani playing a house-husband who doesn't work a job but stays at home to take care of it.

She became a television anchor, with Wah, Kya Scene Hai on Zee TV in 1993, which was followed by Uncensored. She later acted in Shrimaan Shrimati, Junoon and hosted Archana Talkies on Sony Entertainment Television. She also acted in the TV show Zee Horror Show.

She also directed sitcoms like Jaane Bhi Do Paaro and Nehle Pe Dehla and produced Samne Wali Khidki.

In 2005, she was a contestant in the dance reality show Nach Baliye 1, in which she participated with her husband, Parmeet Sethi; they were eliminated in the sixth episode. In 2006, she and her husband hosted another dance reality show Jhalak Dikhhla Jaa.

Thereafter, she appeared as a judge on various comedy shows, including Sony Entertainment Television's Comedy Circus. In 2015, she appeared in SAB TV's The Great Indian Family Drama as Begum Paro.

In 2019, she entered as the judge/permanent guest in The Kapil Sharma Show replacing Navjot Singh Sidhu, and reprised her role in The Great Indian Kapil Show on Netflix in 2024. In 2019, she acted as Lakhan's mother, Paramjeet, in SAB TV serial, My Name Ijj Lakhan opposite her real life husband, Parmeet Sethi. She returned to acting with the web-series Adarsh Baal Vidyalaya.

=== Dubbing career ===
In 2010, she entered the dubbing industry with an Indian animated film, Pangaa Gang, and voiced the antagonist of the film. 9 years later, she returned to the industry to voice Zeta, the leader of Eagle Island in the Hindi version of The Angry Birds Movie 2.

== Filmography ==
=== Films ===
Key
†	Denotes films that have not yet been released

Year	Title	Role(s)	Language(s)	Ref.
1982	Nikaah	Salesgirl	Hindi	
1987	Jalwa	Jyothi	Hindi	
1988	Aaj Ke Angaarey	Priya	Hindi	
1988	The Perfect Murder	Miss Twinkle	Hindi	
1988	Woh Phir Aayegi		Hindi	
1989	Ladaai	Sashi Verma	Hindi	
1990	Aag Ka Gola	Nisha	Hindi	
1990	Agneepath	Shanti/Laila (Note: She played single character with different names)	Hindi	
1991	Jeena Teri Gali Mein		Hindi	
1991	Saudagar		Hindi	
1992	Main Hoon Sherni	Ganga Verma	Hindi	
1992	Zulm Ki Hukumat	Chitra	Hindi	
1992	Shola Aur Shabnam	Mrs. Deva	Hindi	
1992	Naalaya Seidhi		Tamil	
1992	Pandiyan		Tamil	
1992	Bandhu	Bandhu's wife	Hindi	
1992	Baaz	Monica	Hindi	
1993	Aasoo Bane Angaarey	Chanda	Hindi	
1993	Kondapalli Raja		Telugu	
1993	Aashiq Awara	Sheela	Hindi	
1994	Mahakaal	Anita	Hindi	
1994	Yuhi Kabhi		Hindi	
1994	Pyaar Ka Rog		Hindi	
1995	Takkar	Maya	Hindi	
1996	Aisi Bhi Kya Jaldi Hai		Hindi	
1996	Raja Hindustani	Shalini "Shalu" Mitra	Hindi	
1997	Share Bazaar		Hindi	
1997	Judge Mujrim		Hindi	
1998	Kuch Kuch Hota Hai	Miss Breganza	Hindi	
1999	Bade Dilwala	Manthara	Hindi	
1999	Anyay Hi Anyay		Hindi	
2000	Mela	Vidyavati	Hindi	
2000	Mohabbatein	Preeto	Hindi	
2001	Censor	Margaret	Hindi	
2001	Moksha: Salvation	Mrs D'Souza	Hindi	
2002	Maine Dil Tujhko Diya	Dancer	Hindi	
2003	Jhankaar Beats	Ms. Voluptuous	Hindi	
2003	Khanjar: The Knife		Hindi	
2003	Janasheen	Martha	Hindi	
2003	Enakku 20 Unakku 18 / Nee Manasu Naaku Telusu		Tamil / Telugu	
2004	Masti	Mrs. Tyagi	Hindi	
2004	Mirchi - It's Hot		Hindi	
2004	Rok Sako To Rok Lo	Sweety	Hindi	
2004	Aabra Ka Daabra	Suzanne	Hindi	
2005	Insan	Rajjo	Hindi	
2006	The Gold Bracelet	Baljit Singh	Hindi	
2006	Krrish	Nayantara	Hindi	
2006	Mera Dil Leke Dekho		Hindi	
2007	Naqaab	TV Reporter	Hindi	
2008	Mere Baap Pehle Aap	Inspector Bhawani Bhagmar	Hindi	
2008	Love Story 2050	Sangeeta Bedi	Hindi	
2008	Money Hai Toh Honey Hai	Dolly	Hindi	
2008	Rafoo Chakkar: Fun on the Run	Kokila	Hindi	
2008	Good Luck!		Hindi	
2008	Oye Lucky! Lucky Oye!	Kamlesh Handa	Hindi	
2009	Kal Kisne Dekha	Bebe	Hindi	
2009	Tera Mera Ki Rishta		Punjabi	
2009	Bad Luck Govinda	Mamta	Hindi	
2009	De Dana Dan	Kuljeet Kaur	Hindi	
2011	Luv Ka The End	Lux Lovani	Hindi	
2011	Haat - The Weekly Bazaar		Hindi	
2012	Bol Bachchan	Zohra/Madhumati	Hindi	
2014	Kick	Rati Lal Singh	Hindi	
2015	Dolly Ki Doli	Manjot's mother	Hindi	
2015	Uvaa	Jayshri Bhatiya	Hindi	
2019	Housefull 4	Varsha P. Sinha (photo only)	Hindi	
2020	Virgin Bhanupriya	Madhu Awasthi	Hindi	
2023	Walk		Hindi	
2024	Vicky Vidya Ka Woh Wala Video	Vidya's mother	Hindi	
2025	Nadaaniyan	Mrs. Braganza-Malhotra	Hindi	
2026	Toaster	Malini Pherwani	Hindi	

=== Television ===
Year	Title	Role	Notes
1987–1988	Mr Ya Mrs	Seema	
1987	Karamchand	Various characters	
1988	Doordarshan New Year Program	Host	Television special
1993–1997	Wah, Kya Scene Hai	Host	
1993	Zee Horror Show	Julie	Episodic Role
1994–1999	Shrimaan Shrimati	Prema Shalini	
1994	Junoon	Rekha	
1998–1999	Jaane Bhi Do Paaro	Paaro	Also director
1998–1999	Uncensored	Host/presenter	
1999	Nehle Pe Dehla	Various characters	Also director
2000	Archana Talkies	Host/presenter	
2001	Aasman Se Tapki		Also producer
2002–2003	Archana Aaa-Haa	Host/presenter	
2003	Samnewali Khidki	Sanjana	Also producer
2005	Nach Baliye 1	Contestant	
2006	Kandy Floss	Host	
2006	Jhalak Dikhhla Jaa 1	Host	
2007–2018	Comedy Circus	Judge	
2008	Sun Yaar Chill Maar	Miss Briganza	Guest
2014	Bhoot Aaya	Narrator	Episode 20
2015	The Great Indian Family Drama	Begum Paro	
2015–2016	Comedy Classes	Judge	
2018	Aunty Boli Lagao Boli	Aunty	
2019	My Name Ijj Lakhan	Paramjeet	
2019–2023	The Kapil Sharma Show	Permanent Guest	
2022	India's Laughter Champion	Judge	
2024–present	The Great Indian Kapil Show	Permanent Guest	
2026–present	Adarsh Baal Vidyalaya	Urmila Devi	
2026	India's Got Latent	Guest Judge	
2026–present	Dhammal with Pati Patni Aur Panga – Jodiyon Ka Reality Check	Contestant	

== Awards and nominations ==
Year	Award	Category	Work	Result	Ref.
1997	Filmfare Awards	Best Supporting Actress	Raja Hindustani	Nominated	
1999	Filmfare Awards	Best Comedian	Kuch Kuch Hota Hai	Nominated	
1999	Screen Awards	Best Comedian	Kuch Kuch Hota Hai	Won	
1999	Screen Awards	Best Anchor	Archana Talkies	Nominated	
1999	Asian Television Awards	Best Entertainment Presenter/Host	Uncensored	Won	
2000	IIFA Awards	Best Comedian	Mohabbatein	Nominated	
2001	Indian Television Academy Awards	Best Comedian	Aasman Se Tapki	Won	
2006	Method Fest Independent Film Festival	Best Ensemble Cast	The Gold Bracelet	Nominated	

== Personal life ==
Her first marriage with the model Gurinder Singh, also known as Sunny Reya who died accidentally in 1991, did not work and ended in a divorce. She later married actor Parmeet Sethi on 30 June 1992 after 4 year long cohabitation. They have two sons, Aaryamaan and Ayushmaan. Her son Aaryamaan got engaged to actress Yogita Bihani in August 2025.
