= Umar 55 Ki Dil Bachpan Ka =

- Directed by: Ajay Mehra
- Produced by: Ajay Mehra; K. Akshay
- Starring: Kader Khan; Anupam Kher; Swapna Khanna; Gulshan Grover; Aruna Irani; Akshay Anand; Chandni Thakur
- Cinematography: Dilip Dutta
- Music by: Dilip Sen-Sameer Sen
- Release date: 27 November 1992 (India)
- Country: India
- Language: Hindi

Umar 55 Ki Dil Bachpan Ka (translation: Age is 55 But Heart is Still Childish) a 1992 Bollywood crime-comedy-drama film, produced and directed by Ajay Mehra. The film features an ensemble cast of Kader Khan, Anupam Kher, Swapna Khanna, Gulshan Grover, Aruna Irani, Akshay Anand and Chandni Thakur.

== Plot ==
Giving in to the demands of his children, namely: Govindram, Rohit, Aarti, and his daughter-in-law, Sunita, Dhaniram distributes his wealth between the four of them. Rohit prefers not to participate in this, and remains devoted to his dad. Greed overtakes Govind, Aarti and Govind's wife, and they become arrogant and ill-mannered. Even his daughter gets married without his consent to Shashi. Dhaniram and his lawyer Batliwala contact Dhaniram's twin brother Maniram, and together they get Dhaniram married to Priya, who is much younger than Dhaniram. Thus the beneficiary of Dhaniram's estate is now changed to Priya, and it remains to be seen whether this will affect Dhaniram, Maniram, Govind, Rohit, Aarti, Snita, Shashim and others.

== Cast ==
- Kader Khan as Maniram / Dhaniram
- Anupam Kher as Vakil Batliwala
- Gulshan Grover as Malhotra
- Aruna Irani as Rani
- Akshay Anand as Rohit
- Chandni Thakur as Aarti
- Ruchika Pandey as Sonia
- Dinesh Hingoo as Lakhpatiya
- Shakti Kapoor as Govindram
- Tiku Talsania as Avinash Chatterjee
- Shashikiran as Shashi
- Swapna Khanna as Priya

== Music ==
1. "Jab Se Mila Hai Mujhe" - Anuradha Paudwal, Kumar Sanu
2. "Ye Dil Kaho To Dedu" - Alka Yagnik, Kumar Sanu
3. "Umar Pachpan Ki Dil Bachpan Ka" - Sudesh Bhosale, Sarika Kapoor, Aparna Mayekar
4. "Duniya Ko Chhod Ke, Rasmo Ko Tod Ke" - Amit Kumar, Alka Yagnik
5. "I Love You" - Alisha Chinai, Sudesh Bhosale
6. "Bombay Town" - Sudesh Bhosale, Jolly Mukherjee, Sarika Kapoor
7. "Jab Se Mila Hai Mujhe Pyar" (Sad) - Kumar Sanu
