= Appaji =

- Directed by: D. Rajendra Babu
- Written by: Richard Louis (dialogues)
- Screenplay by: D. Rajendra Babu
- Story by: V. Vijayendra Prasad
- Produced by: H. S. Janakiram; C. S. Manju
- Starring: Vishnuvardhan; Aamani; Pankaj Dheer
- Cinematography: Prasad Babu
- Edited by: K. Balu
- Music by: M. M. Keeravani
- Production company: Surya International
- Release date: 4 January 1996
- Running time: 139 min
- Country: India
- Language: Kannada

Appaji is a 1996 Indian Kannada-language action drama film starring Vishnuvardhan and Aamani. The film was directed by D. Rajendra Babu, written by V. Vijayendra Prasad and produced under Surya International banner. The music was scored by M. M. Keeravani. The movie was dubbed in Telugu with the same name. The story writer of this movie, V. Vijayendra Prasad reused a famous sequence of this movie - "Taking lift cunningly in the guise of helping a vehicle which seems to be broken down which was actually caused by himself" (just before the song "Ene Kannadathi" ) -later in his 2015 Hindi movie Bajrangi Bhaijaan.

== Cast ==
- Vishnuvardhan as Appaji and Shakthi (dual role)
- Aamani as Lakshmi Desai, Shakthi's girlfriend
- Pankaj Dheer as Arjun (Voice dubbed by P. Ravi Shankar)
- Sharanya as Rekha
- Sihi Kahi Chandru as Boda
- Doddanna as Home Minister
- Keerthi as Ranadheer Desai
- Krishne Gowda as Shankar Rao
- Lakshman as Captain, Appaji and Shakthi's wellwisher
- M. S. Karanth as IAS officer

== Music ==
Appaji

Soundtrack album by M. M. Keeravani
- Released: 1996
- Genre: Feature film soundtrack
- Producer: M. M. Keeravani

M. M. Keeravani chronology
| Rayudugaru Nayudugaru (1996) | Appaji (1996) | Bombay Priyudu (1996) |

All the songs are composed and scored by M. M. Keeravani. The song Yaava Deva Shilpi was reused from Keeravani's own Telugu song Sirichandanapu from Muddula Priyudu. The song 'Ene Kannadathi' is based on Ee Nela Manadira from People's Encounter. The sequence before the song Ene Kannadathi where the hero cunningly takes lift after restarting a vehicle broken down by himself was re-used by writer V. Vijayendra Prasad for his 2015 Hindi movie Bajrangi Bhaijaan.

| S. No. | Song title | Singer(s) | Lyricist |
|---|---|---|---|
| 1 | "Ene Kannadathi" | S. P. Balasubrahmanyam | R. N. Jayagopal |
| 2 | "Balu Rambada" | Mano, K. S. Chithra | R. N. Jayagopal |
| 3 | "Maama Jaba Jaba" | Malgudi Subha | R. N. Jayagopal |
| 4 | "Yaava Deva Shilpi" | S. P. Balasubrahmanyam, K. S. Chithra | R. N. Jayagopal |
| 5 | "Baanu Ello Kanenu" | S. P. Balasubrahmanyam, K. S. Chithra | R. N. Jayagopal |
| 6 | "Gharshane Gharshane" | S. P. Balasubrahmanyam | R. N. Jayagopal |

== Release ==
The movie was released on 4 January 1996.
