= Yaara Dildara =

- Vinyl Record Cover
- Directed by: Mirza Brothers
- Starring: Aasif Sheikh; Ruchika Pandey
- Music by: Jatin–Lalit
- Release date: 13 December 1991
- Running time: 150 minutes
- Country: India
- Language: Hindi

Yaara Dildara is a 1991 Indian Hindi-language romantic drama film directed by Mirza Brothers. It stars Aasif Sheikh and Ruchika Pandey. The film also marked debut of music directors Jatin–Lalit.

== Plot ==
A lonely son of a rich industrialist falls in love with a poor girl but life won't be easy for him without his mother's consent. A local goon is also deeply in love with the same girl.

== Cast ==
- Aasif Sheikh as Rajesh Mehra
- Ruchika Pandey as Rajni Yadav
- Rohini Hattangadi as Shanti Mehra
- Saeed Jaffrey as Mr. Mehra
- Shakti Kapoor as Ramaiya
- Kader Khan as Inspector Le Le
- Amjad Khan as Inspector De De
- Ashok Saraf as Mr. Yadav
- Amita Nangia as Madhavi aka Madhu
- Laxmikant Berde
- Viju Khote
- Mohan Choti
- Rajendra Nath

== Soundtrack ==
Yaara Dildara

Studio album by Jatin–Lalit
- Released: 1991–1991
- Genre: Feature film soundtrack
- Label: Venus Records & Tapes
- Producer: Jatin–Lalit

Jatin–Lalit chronology
Yaara Dildara (1991)	Jo Jeeta Wohi Sikandar (1992)

The songs "Tum Hi Hamari Ho Manzil, My Love" and "Bin Tere Sanam" were sampled from "Tum Ko Jo Dekha" and "Leja Mera Dil" respectively, from Jatin–Lalit's private album Rhythmic Love (1986). Lyrics for all songs are written by Majrooh Sultanpuri.

"Bin Tere Sanam" was a massive success, becoming the most popular song from the soundtrack.

#	Song	Singer
1.	"Bin Tere Sanam"	Udit Narayan, Kavita Krishnamurthy
2.	"Hamare Papa Aur Hum"	Amit Kumar, Bhupinder Singh
3.	"Tum Hi Hamari Ho Manzil My Love"	Udit Narayan, Anuradha Paudwal
4.	"Woh Jo Kaha Tha Maine"	Udit Narayan, Kavita Krishnamurthy
5.	"Koi Chahe Na Chahe"	Nitin Mukesh, Kavita Krishnamurthy
6.	"Ab To Tumhe Hai Dikhana"	Udit Narayan, Abhijeet
7.	"Le Le De De Ka Police Mein Kya Kaam"	Abhijeet
8.	"Bin Tere Sanam-Western Rhythm"	Udit Narayan, Kavita Krishnamurthy
