= Just Mohabbat =

- Directed by: Tony Singh; Deeya Singh
- Starring: See below
- Theme music composer: Raju Singh
- Opening theme: "Just Mohabbat" performed by KK
- Country of origin: India
- No. of episodes: 186

Production
- Producer: DJ's a Creative Unit
- Running time: 22 minutes

Original release
- Network: Sony Entertainment Television
- Release: 1996 – 2000

Just Mohabbat (transl. Just love) is an India television series which aired on Sony TV channel from 1996 to 2000. The series was directed by Tony and Deeya Singh.

The story revolved around the life of Jai (Harsh Lunia and later Vatsal Sheth), a kid who studies at a boarding school in Dehradun away from his parents, Raj (Salim Shah) and Maya (Kavita Kapoor). The series chronicles his growing up years and focuses on his relationships with his family and friends, specially his friends Madhur, Roma, and Sanjay, and his imaginary friend Gautam (Aditya Kapadia). Vatsal Sheth portrayed the role of Jai in his teen years.

== Premise ==
The show follows the life of a young Jai who is friendly and quiet but enjoys a good time with his closest friends. He is loved and pampered by the house help Desmond who is close to him. Later Jai's long lost Uncle J.D. comes to live with him. The episodes followed a young Jai grow up to be an adolescent experiencing his first crush, first heartbreak and first love all the while trying to make sense of other relationships and friendships in his life.

== Cast ==
- Harsh Lunia as young Jai Malhotra
- Vatsal Sheth as adolescent Jai Malhotra
- Aditya Kapadia as Gautam, Jai's imaginary friend
- Chandana Sharma as Aditi, Jai's girlfriend
- Jennifer Kotwal as Saloni, Jai and Aditi's friend
- Ashok Lokhande as Desmond, the house help who loves Jai as his own son
- Saleem Shah as Raj Malhotra, Jai's father
- Kavita Kapoor as Maya Malhotra, Jai's mother
- Alefia Kapadia as Pia Malhotra, Jai's elder sister
- Ravi Baswani as J.D. Uncle
- Tanvee Sharma as Madhur Lamba
- Karanvir Bohra as Kabir
- Manoj Pahwa as Ishwar
- Surekha Sikri as Mrs. Pandit
- Anita Kanwal as Sumedha
- Kunaal Roy Kapur as Sanjay, Ishwar's son and Jai's childhood friend
- Yash Tonk as H.S.S (Harveer Singh Sodhi)
- Sadiya Siddiqui as Laila
- Irrfan Khan as Mr. Singh
