= Dharmesh Tiwari =

Indian film director

- Born: 27 April 1951
- Died: 6 August 2014 (aged 63); Chandigarh, India
- Occupations: Actor, film director
- Years active: 1984–2008

Dharmesh Tiwari (27 April 1951 – 6 August 2014) was an Indian actor and film director. He is memorable for portraying Kripacharya in the TV series Mahabharat and Malayraj in Chanakya.

He essayed the role of a judge on the Hindi TV serial Kanoon.

He directed and wrote the script for Mahabharat Aur Barbareek in 2013. This was his last project.

In 2001, he was Honorary General Secretary of Cine and TV Artistes Association.

In 2003, he was president of the Federation of Western India Cine Employees, a film worker's union.

Dharmesh also did the role of Jaswant Singh in as ABP News 26 episodes series of political show Pradhanmantri in 2013.

Tiwari died of diabetes at the age of 63 on 6 August 2014.

== Selected filmography ==
- 1993 Tirangaa as Defence Lawyer
- 1996 Sapoot as Television News Reader
- 1997 Judaai (1997 film) as Lawyer
