= Kavita Kapoor =

Indian film and television actress

- Born: Pune
- Occupations: Film and television Actress
- Years active: 1991–present
- Known for: Yes Boss

Kavita Kapoor is an Indian film and television actress, most known for her role in television series Yes Boss (1999–2009). She was part of shows like Just Mohabbat (1996–2000) and Saans (1998–1999).

== Career ==
She debuted with the film Jeena Teri Gali Mein in 1991 as Khushboo. Her first television series is Kanoon (1993–1996). She played the role of a doctor in Doordarshan serial Ajnabi (1994), Maya in Just Mohabbat (1996–2000), Manisha in Saans (1998–1999) and Meera Srivastava in Yes Boss (1999–2009).

== Filmography ==
Year	Film	Role	Notes
1991	Jeena Teri Gali Mein	Khushboo	
2004	King of Bollywood	Mandira Kumar	
2005	Salaam Namaste	Doctor	
2025	Mere Husband Ki Biwi	Mrs. Chaddha	

=== Television ===
Year	Series	Role
1994–1995	Ajnabi	Doctor
1993–1996	Kanoon	Milli
1996–2000	Just Mohabbat	Maya
1998–1999	Saans	Manisha
1999–2009	Yes Boss	Meera Srivastava
2000–2002	Kittie Party	Reva
2009–2010	Pyaar Ka Bandhan	Sonia Rai
2010–2011	Rakt Sambandh	Prabha
2015–2016	Sumit Sambhal Lega	Avantika Seth
2023–2024	Vanshaj	Shobhana Mahajan aka Mahajani
