= Rahul Roy =

Indian actor (b. 1966)

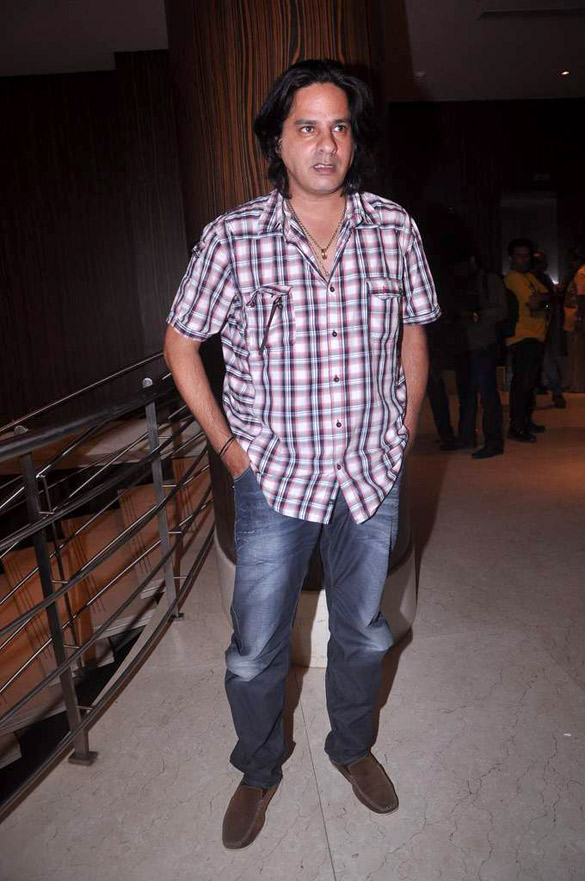
- Rahul Roy in 2012
- Born: 9 February 1966 (age 60); Bombay, Maharashtra, India
- Education: The Lawrence School, Sanawar
- Occupations: Actor, model, producer
- Years active: 1990–present
- Spouse: Rajlakshmi Khanvilkar (m. 2000; div. 2014)

Rahul Roy (born 9 February 1966) is an Indian actor, producer and former model known for his works in Hindi films and television. Roy began his acting career with the 1990 film Aashiqui, a Mahesh Bhatt production as the lead actor with newcomer Anu Aggarwal. He then appeared opposite Karishma Kapoor in Sudhakar Bokade's romantic film Sapne Sajan Ke (1992). Roy has been honoured with life membership of the International Film And Television Club of Asian Academy of Film & Television.

Roy delivered a notable performance in Mahesh Bhatt's 1993 autobiographical Phir Teri Kahani Yaad Aayee, Roy's character is based on the filmmaker. The film was Zee TV's first mainstream production. Roy then featured in Bhatt's production Jaanam, which was Vikram Bhatt's directorial debut.

In 2006, Roy participated and won the first season of game show Bigg Boss – the Indian version of Celebrity Big Brother, produced by Endemol India for Colors Viacom 18. Roy has ventured into movie production. His company, Rahul Roy Productions, released its first film, Elaan, on 25 November 2011 in Bihar.

== Personal life ==
Roy was born to Deepak and Indira Roy and educated at the Lawrence School, Sanawar in Himachal Pradesh. His maternal uncle is Cory Walia, a renowned name in tinsel town, and on the fashion circuit, especially as make-up artist of celebrities. Through his mother, he has a multi-ethnic background, with Punjabi Sikh, Burmese, Maratha Rajput and Goan Saraswat descent. He was married to Rajlakshmi Khanvilkar (Rani), a fashion model, who had been previously married to Samir Soni. They divorced amicably in 2014.

== Career ==
In the early 1990s, Roy appeared in several romantic films that did not do well, although his performances in Majhdhaar, Dilwale Kabhi Na Hare, Pyar Ka Saaya and Jaanam were well-received. His best acting performance is considered by many to be in Junoon. In the late 1990s, Roy mostly played supporting actor roles. He got his big break in the 1990 film Aashiqui.

After Aashiqui, Roy signed many films. Apart from Junoon, most of them did not become hits. Many of the films he had signed ended up being shelved. K.Balachander's film Dilon Ka Rishta was shelved due to the death of producer R. C. Prakash; another important film, Ayudh, was shelved due to the director's untimely death. His other shelved films are Premabhishek, Tune Mera Dil Le Liya with Raveena Tandon, N. R. Pachisia's Dil Diya Chori Chori with Karishma Kapoor, Balwant Dullat's Phir Kabhi, Mahesh Bhatt's Kalyug, Harry Baweja's Vajra with Raveena Tandon and Shilpa Shirodkar and Jab Jab Dil Mile with Karishma Kapoor and Nagma.

Roy was going to play the male lead in Mahesh Bhatt's Khilona, the Bollywood remake of the Kevin Costner thriller Revenge, but it was shelved as well. Roy returned to acting after four years in Meri Aashiqui (2005), in which he played the lead role. His most recent films include the comedy film Naughty Boy (2006) and Rafta Rafta – The Speed, in which he played the role of an underworld don. He also appeared on the television program Bigg Boss, the Indian version of Celebrity Big Brother in 2006. He won the show by public votes on 26 January 2007. Roy made a comeback with Harikrit Films psychological thriller To B or Not to B.

== Filmography ==
=== Films ===
Year	Film	Role	References
1990	Aashiqui	Rahul Roy	First film
1991	Pyaar Ka Saaya	Avinash (Avi) Saxena/Rakesh Saxena	Double Role
1992	Ghazab Tamasha	Sita Ram	
1992	Sapne Sajan Ke	Deepak	
1992	Junoon	Vikram Chauhan	
1992	Dilwale Kabhi Na Hare	Rahul	
1993	Game	Vijay	
1993	Bhookamp	Inspector Rahul Singh	
1993	Phir Teri Kahani Yaad Aayee	Rahul	Television film
1993	Pehla Nasha	Himself	
1993	Gumrah	Rahul Malhotra	
1993	Jaanam	Amar Rao	
1993	Baarish		
1994	Hanste Khelte	Rahul Chopra	Television film
1996	Megha	Akash	
1996	Majhdhaar	Krishna	
1997	Dharma Karma	Kumar	
1997	Naseeb	Deepak	
1998	Achanak	Vijay Nanda	
1999	Phir Kabhi	Vikram	
2000	Tune Mera Dil Le Liyaa	Vijay	
2001	Afsana Dilwalon Ka	Anwar	
2005	Meri Aashiqui	Daniel	
2006	Rafta Rafta – The Speed	Spencer	
2006	Naughty Boy	Singhania	
2006	Vidyarthi	Inspector	
2006	Bipasha – The Black Beauty	Lawyer	
2010	Crime Partner		
2010	Ada...A Way of Life		
2011	Elaan	Army Officer	Bhojpuri film
2013	Sabse Bada Mujrim		
2015	2B Or Not To B	Nikhil	
2017	2016 The End	Don Dicosta	
2018	Night & Fog	Tanvir Ahmad	
2019	A Thin Line	Mr. Thapar	
2019	Cabaret	Rahul Roy	ZEE5 original film
2022	Smile Hearts		
2023	Walk	Roshan	
2023	Agra	Daddy Ji	
TBD	LAC		

=== Television ===
Year	Film	Role	Notes
2001	Kaise Kahoon	Feroz	
2003–2004	Karishma – The Miracles of Destiny	Rahul	
2003	Ehsaas - Kahani Ek Ghar Ki	Arjun	
2006–2007	Bigg Boss 1	Winner	
