= Phir Teri Kahani Yaad Aayee =

Phir Teri Kahani Yaad Ayee
- Release poster
- Directed by: Mahesh Bhatt
- Written by: Jay Dixit
- Produced by: Jonny Bakshi; Nitin Keni
- Starring: Pooja Bhatt; Rahul Roy; Pooja Bedi
- Cinematography: Pravin Bhatt
- Music by: Anu Malik
- Production company: Essel Vision
- Distributed by: Zee TV
- Release date: 30 July 1993
- Country: India
- Language: Hindi

Phir Teri Kahani Yaad Ayee (transl. Then I remembered your story) is an Indian 90's melodious musical Hindi-language romance film. It was produced by Jonny Bakshi and Nitin Keni, directed by Mahesh Bhatt, and starred Pooja Bhatt and Rahul Roy. The film premiered on Zee TV on 30 July 1993.

== Plot ==
An alcoholic movie director, Rahul ends up in a Rehabilitation Centre. Once there, he finds out that there is an inmate, Pooja, who has schizophrenia and other mental problems. After an initial clash of personalities, the two become fast friends, and find that they are in love with each other. But Pooja's paranoia and instability makes any relationship impossible, and as a result she is hospitalized in a mental institution. Shortly thereafter, there is a fire at the institution, and Pooja is killed in it.

Rahul is devastated by Pooja's death, and is unable to take her off of his mind. One of his movie actresses, Seema, and his brother Rohit, attempt to divert his mind, without much success. Then Rahul starts getting phone calls from a girl whose voice resembles Pooja's. Near the end it is found out that Pooja is alive, and she was the one who had burned down the mental institution because "she didn't like it there". Rahul and Pooja run away from the cops and Pooja's dad who wants her back in mental hospital is trying to trace her. They roam the jungle and change places, but they are caught by the police in a town and at the climax Pooja snatches a gun from a police officer and shoots herself saying she doesn't want to go back to the mental hospital, she wants to be with Rahul. Her grandfather and Rahul helplessly watch her die.

== Cast ==
- Pooja Bhatt as Pooja
- Rahul Roy as Rahul
- Pooja Bedi as Seema
- Avtar Gill as Pooja's Grandfather
- Bhushan Patel as Rohit
- Neena Gupta as Street Dancer
- Javed Khan Amrohi as Beggar
- G.P. Singh
- Anu Malik as himself singing "Haan Deewana Hoon Main" (special guest appearance)

== Soundtrack ==
Phir Teri Kahani Yaad Aayi

Soundtrack album by Anu Malik
- Released: 16 July 1993
- Genre: Film soundtrack
- Length: 57:32
- Label: Tips Music Films

Anu Malik chronology
Tahqiqaat (1993)	Phir Teri Kahani Yaad Aayi (1993)	Sir (1993)

Music for Phir Teri Kahani Yaad Aayi was composed by Anu Malik while lyrics were penned by Qateel Shifai, Kaifi Azmi and Zameer Kazmi. The soundtrack consisting of 9 Tracks was released on Tips Music on 16 July 1993. The song "Tere Dar Par Sanam" was sung in both male and female version, were sung by Kumar Sanu and Sadhana Sargam. The soundtrack became very popular, especially the tracks "Tere Dar Par Sanam". According to the Indian trade website Box Office India, with around 2,800,000 units sold the soundtrack became the sixth highest-grossing album of the year. The soundtrack was #63 on the list of "100 Greatest Bollywood Soundtracks of All Time", as compiled by Planet Bollywood

All music is composed by Anu Malik.

Track Listing
No.	Title	Singer(s)	Length
1.	"Tere Dar Par Sanam (Male)"	Kumar Sanu	6:08
2.	"Dil Mein Sanam Ki Soorat"	Kumar Sanu, Alka Yagnik	6:06
3.	"Baadalon Mein Chup Raha"	Kumar Sanu, Alka Yagnik	6:14
4.	"Dil Deta Hai Ro Ro Duhai"	Alka Yagnik	8:23
5.	"Aane Wala Kal Ek Sapna"	Kumar Sanu	7:23
6.	"Shairana Si Hai Zindagi" (Raga Darbari Kanada)	Alka Yagnik	6:56
7.	"Tere Dar Par Sanam (Female)"	Sadhana Sargam	6:08
8.	"Dil Deta Hai Ro Ro Duhai"	Pankaj Udhas	8:20
9.	"Aane Wala Kal Ek Sapna"	Anu Malik	7:26
Total length:			57:32
