= Miss 420 =

- Movie poster
- Directed by: Akashdeep Sabir
- Written by: Sayed Sultan (additional scripting)
- Produced by: Ganesh Jain; Ratan Jain
- Starring: Baba Sehgal; Sheeba Akashdeep; Aashif Sheikh
- Cinematography: Thomas X. Lenin
- Music by: Anu Malik
- Distributed by: Venus Records & Tapes
- Release date: 23 January 1998
- Running time: 134 mins
- Country: India
- Language: Hindi
- Budget: ₹1.25 crore
- Box office: ₹92.77 lakh

Miss 420 is a 1998 Indian Hindi-language action thriller film directed by Akashdeep Sabir and produced by Ganesh Jain and Ratan Jain under the Venus Records & Tapes banner. The film stars Sheeba Akashdeep in the title role alongside rapper Baba Sehgal in his acting debut. Shakti Kapoor, Aashif Sheikh, Mohan Joshi and Tinnu Anand play key supporting roles in the film. The soundtrack of the film was composed by Anu Malik. Shot and completed in 1993, the film was initially scheduled for release in January 1994. However, the release was delayed for several years, and it was eventually released in cinema halls four years later on 23 January 1998.

The film featured songs "Aaja Meri Gaadi Me Baith Ja" and "Memsaab O Memsaab" that became chartbusters, but the film was a disaster at the box office, grossing worldwide ₹92.77 lakh against a budget of ₹1.25 crore.

== Cast ==
- Baba Sehgal as Vicky / Mr 421
- Sheeba Akashdeep as Miss Mohini Anamika / Shikha Sharma/
- Shakti Kapoor as CBI Officer
- Aasif Sheikh as Arvind (Anamika Brother)
- Tinnu Anand as Khan / Mr Aluwalia
- Johnny Lever as Tony Fernandes
- Mohan Joshi as Diwan Kapoor (DK)
- Amita Nangia Fake MISS 420 / Sheena

== Music ==
Miss 420

Soundtrack album by Anu Malik
- Released: 27 April 1994
- Recorded: 1993–1994
- Label: Venus Records & Tapes

The soundtrack of the film was composed by Anu Malik and it was released on April 27, 1994. It featured a total of eight tracks. Four songs were sung by Baba Sehgal including the track "Aaja Meri Gaadi Me Baith Ja", one of the singer's most popular tracks. Another song "Memsaab O Memsaab" was also a major chartbuster. Lyrics were penned by Anu Malik, Dev Kohli, Indeevar, Maya Govind, Rani Malik and Shaily Shailendra.

The film's protagonist Sheeba revealed in a 2024 interview with Siddharth Kannan that the song "Chura Ke Dil Mera" by Kumar Sanu and Alka Yagnik was originally recorded by Anu Malik for Miss 420, but Venus Records used the song in their other movie Main Khiladi Tu Anari (1994), which also featured soundtrack composed by Anu Malik.

Miss 420: Original Motion Picture Soundtrack
No.	Title	Lyrics	Singer(s)	Length
1.	"Aaja Meri Gaadi Me Baith Jaa"	Anu Malik	Baba Sehgal, Anu Malik	6:48
2.	"Memsaab O Memsaab (Part 1)"	Shaily Shailendra	Baba Sehgal, Sheeba	7:22
3.	"O Baba Kiss Me"	Indeevar	Alisha Chinai, Ravindra Sathe	8:12
4.	"Memsaab O Memsaab (Part 2)"	Shaily Shailendra	Anu Malik, Sheeba	7:26
5.	"Mere Dil Mein"	Rani Malik	Kumar Sanu	7:20
6.	"Ha Kah De Ya Na"	Dev Kohli	Baba Sehgal, Alisha Chinai	5:56
7.	"Dhak Dhak Ye Dil"	Shaily Shailendra	Baba Sehgal, Sheeba	7:01
8.	"Jhoom Re Baba"	Maya Govind	Hema Sardesai	6:25
Total length:				56:00
