= Pankaj Berry =

Indian television actor

- Born: 8 January 1956 (age 70); Ambala, Punjab, India
- Occupation: Actor
- Years active: 1987–present
- Known for: Tathacharya in Tenali Rama

Pankaj Berry (born 8 January 1956) is an Indian film and television actor.

He did his post-graduation from Department of Indian Theatre, Panjab University, Chandigarh where he acted in many theatre productions of the department. He first appeared in a small role in Govind Nihalani's Tamas, in which he played the role of Surekha Sikri's son. His first major break came with the television series Gul Gulshan Gulfaam on Doordarshan in 1987. College Girl was his first Bollywood film. He went on to appear in many television series and films after that. He gained wide popularity through the role of Tathacharya in Tenali Rama.

== Filmography ==
=== Films ===
Year	Film	Role
1988	Main Zinda Hoon	Alok's Brother
1990	College Girl	Vikram (Vicky) Singh
1991	Subedaar	Bhoopa
1992	Pyar Deewana Hota Hai	Vijay Mehra
1992	Balwaan	Pankaj
1992	Dilwale Kabhi Na Hare	Roshanlal
1993	My Story	
1993	Tirangaa	Dr. Sinha
1993	Game	Ajay
1993	Divya Shakti	Francis
1993	Kayda Kanoon	
1993	Sainik	Pankaj Chaudhary
1994	Sone Ki Sita	
1994	Maha Shaktishaali	
1995	Vartmaan	
1996	Chaahat	Raja
2000	Tapish	
2000	Rahasya	
2000	Apradhi Kaun	Alok
2019	Kissebaaz	Harsh's father
2015	Mumbai Can Dance Saala	
2011	Vikalp	
2009	Aisi Deewangi	Shekar's Uncle
2009	Team: The Force	
2009	Miss	
2006	With Luv... Tumhaara	Major Balwant Singh
2005	Mazaa Mazaa	
2005	Netaji Subhas Chandra Bose: The Forgotten Hero	Aabid Khan
2004	Hatya: The Murder	Babu Rokde
2004	Mission Mumbai	
2004	Shola: Fire of Love	Nagoba
2003	Sparsh: The Touch	
2003	Market	Appa Rao
2003	Dil Ka Rishta	Doctor
2002	Aakhri Inteqam	
2002	Hathyar	
2002	Ansh: The Deadly Part	Inspector Patil
2002	Ghaav: The Wound	Jayant
2001	Veer Savarkar	Madan Lal Dhingra
2001	Mujhe Kucch Kehna Hai	Pankaj
2001	Boond	John
1991	Phool Aur Kaante	College Student (Cameo Role)
1990	Ghayal	

=== Television ===
Year	Serial	Role
1987	Gul Gulshan Gulfaam	Qadir
1988	Bharat Ek Khoj	Episodic Roles
1988	Mahabharat	Rishi Kindama
1991	Sanjha Chulha	
1993	Junoon	Mr. Agrawal
1994	Tehkikaat	A ghost of John Perreira (Episode no 48,49,50) - Viren Chawla
1995	Vansh	
1995	Ek Tha Rusty	
1995	Zameen-Aasmaan	Chander
1995	Swabhimaan	Dinesh Shah
1996	Karm	Kesari Pandit
1997	Sab Golmaal Hai	
2001 - 2002	Sansaar	
2002	Amrapali	Bimbisara
2002	Kittie Party	
2005	CID Special Bureau	Episode Mystery of the Smiling Cat Part 4 - as Professor Arknath
2006	Agneepath	
2007	Maayka	Mr. T.D Khurana
2007-08	Meri Doli Tere Angana	Rajveer Malhotra
2008-09	Ranbir Rano	Rano's Uncle
2009	Mere Ghar Aayi Ek Nanhi Pari	Chacha
2009-11	Yahaaan Main Ghar Ghar Kheli	Raghav Pandit
2010-11	Yeh Ishq Haaye	Manjari's dad
2014	Devon Ke Dev...Mahadev	Maharaj Durdumb
2013	Pradhanmantri	Muhammad Mahabat Khan III
2014-2016	Crime Patrol	Episode No 624- Varchasva (Dashrath Choubey), Episode No 669,670- Ghera (Harjeet Gill) Episode No 722- Haasil (Dr Govind Trivedi)
2015 - 2016	Siya Ke Ram	Mayasur
2016	Waaris	Suraiya
2017	Gangaa	Shiv's father
2017	Hoshiyar… Sahi Waqt, Sahi Kadam	SP Sanghvi
2017	Peshwa Bajirao	Krishnaji Bhatt
2017	CID	Sushil Jayanti (Episode 1416: Vasiyat Ka Raaj)
2017–2020, 2024–2025	Tenali Rama	Rajguru Tathacharya
2021	Sargam ki Sadhe Satii	Baba
2021	Mere Sai - Shraddha Aur Saburi	Chakra Narayan
2021	Kaatelal & Sons	Balraj Solanki
2022	Brij Ke Gopal	Gyandhar
2022–2023	Dil Diyaan Gallaan	Dilpreet Singh Brar
2024	Qayaamat Se Qayaamat Tak	Haribol Raghuvanshi
