= Gufi Paintal =

Indian actor and director (1944–2023)

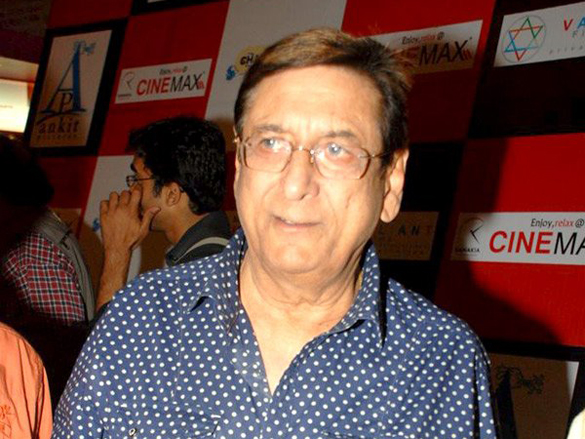
- Paintal in 2010
- Born: Sarabjeet Singh Paintal; 4 October 1944; Lahore, Punjab, British India
- Died: 5 June 2023 (aged 78); Mumbai, Maharashtra, India
- Occupations: Actor, casting director
- Years active: 1978–2023
- Spouse: Rekha Paintal
- Children: Harry Paintal (son)
- Relatives: Kanwarjit Paintal (brother); Hiten Paintal (nephew)
- Military service
- Allegiance: India
- Branch: Indian Army
- Service years: 1962–1968
- Conflicts: Sino-Indian War

Gufi Paintal (4 October 1944 – 5 June 2023), also known as Sarabjeet Singh Paintal, was an Indian actor and casting director.

Initially trained as an engineer, he joined the Indian Army during the Sino-Indian War in 1962. While on the border, a folk play of Ramlila was conducted in which he performed the role of Sita, from where he became interested in acting. Then he came to Bombay where his younger brother Paintal (who had been trained at the Film and Television Institute of India) was trying his career in acting. Arriving in Bombay in 1969, Gufi took up modelling, worked as an assistant director for movies and acted in various movies and serials. He also directed his brother. His most well-known role is that of Shakuni in Mahabharat (1988 TV series) by B.R. Chopra and his son Ravi Chopra, which Paintal himself recognized as his best role. He was so associated with his Shakuni character in India that Paintal presented a political discussion show on the news channel Sahara Samay in the character of Shakuni.

Paintal directed the movie Shri Chaitanya Mahaprabhu, which sketches the life of Chaitanya Mahaprabhu, a 16th-century devotee of Krishna who is recognised as an incarnation of the god by followers of Gaudiya Vaishnavism. The film was produced by Pawan Kumar with music by Ravindra Jain. In 2010 he was appointed head of facility at the Abbhinnay Acting Academy in Mumbai, a school established by his Mahabharata co-star Pankaj Dheer.

== Death ==
Paintal died in a Mumbai hospital on 5 June 2023, at the age of 78.

== Filmography ==
=== Films ===
Year	Films	Roles
1978	Dillagi	Ganesh
1978	Des Pardes	
1984	Aaj Ki Awaaj	
1992	Kal Ki Awaz	Srivastav, Bank Manager
1994	Suhaag	Akshay kumar's maternal uncle
1995	Maidan-E-Jung	Mamaji
1997	Daava	Mangal Singh (One Piece Kathiavadi Ghodo)
1998	Sham Ghansham	Chintamani
2000	The Revenge: Geeta Mera Naam	
2006	Ghoom	Vijay Dikshit's Boss
2008	Ghatothkach	Shakuni Mama
2010	Toofan	Pooru Chacha
2013	Mahabharat Aur Barbareek	Shakuni
2014	Samrat & Co.	Dinesh Das a.k.a. DD Family Lawyer

=== Television ===
Year	Serial	Role	Notes
1986	Bahadur Shah Zafar	Charles Metcalfe	
1988–1990	Mahabharat	Shakuni	also casting director
1993–1996	Kanoon	Justice Raghunath	
1992	Sauda		
1997-1999	Aahat	Raghu, Vijendra	
1997–2001	Om Namah Shivay	Shakuni	
1998–1999	Akbar Birbal	Mulla Do Pyaza	
2001	CID (Indian TV series)	Chander	
2002	Ssshhhh...Koi Hai	Dr. Jarkos	
2003	The Magic Make-Up Box	Brithari	
2011–2012	Dwarkadheesh Bhagwaan Shree Krishn	Shakuni	
2012–2013	Mrs. Kaushik Ki Paanch Bahuein	Brijbhushan Bhalla	
2013	Bharat Ka Veer Putra – Maharana Pratap	Humayun	
2016–2018	Karmaphal Daata Shani	Vishwakarma	
2018	Karn Sangini	Kripacharya	
2019–2023	RadhaKrishn	Vishwakarma	
2021–2022	Jay Kaniya lal Ki	Vishwakarma	
