= Kandy Floss (TV series) =

Indian talk show

- Genre: Talk show
- Created by: Ekta Kapoor
- Creative director: Sandip Sikchand
- Starring: Archana Puran Singh
- Country of origin: India
- Original languages: Hindi; English
- No. of seasons: 1
- No. of episodes: 20

Production
- Producers: Ekta Kapoor; Shobha Kapoor
- Production locations: Mumbai, Maharashtra, India
- Camera setup: Single-camera
- Running time: 45 minutes
- Production company: Balaji Telefilms

Original release
- Network: Sony Entertainment Television
- Release: 10 March – 28 July 2006

Kandy Floss is an Indian talk show created and produced by Ekta Kapoor and Shobha Kapoor under their banner Balaji Telefilms. The series premiered on 10 March 2006 on Sony Entertainment Television. The series is hosted by Archana Puran Singh.

== Plot ==
The series is a talk show where chats revolving television celebrities, their life styles, behind the scenes and their unknown secrets are discussed about.

== Cast ==
=== Host ===
- Archana Puran Singh

=== Guests ===
- Urvashi Dholakia
- Shweta Tiwari
- Iqbal Khan & Amit Tandon
- Yash Tonk
