= Jaagruti =

- Theatrical release poster
- Directed by: Suresh Krishna
- Written by: Anwar Khan
- Produced by: S R Shetty
- Starring: Salman Khan; Karisma Kapoor
- Cinematography: S.M. Anwar
- Edited by: Sunder Shetty
- Music by: Anand–Milind
- Distributed by: Shetty Films
- Release date: 1992
- Running time: 135 minutes
- Country: India
- Language: Hindi

Jaagruti is a 1992 Indian Hindi-language action drama film directed by Suresh Krissna. The film stars Salman Khan and Karisma Kapoor. It was produced by stunt director Raam Shetty under the name of S. R. Shetty.

== Plot ==
Vishal (Pankaj Dheer) is a respectable and honest officer. One day Vishal is abducted and killed in the presence of his younger brother, Jugnu (Salman Khan), who is missing and considered to be dead. In reality, he is taken in by a jungle tribe, where the chief, (Puneet Issar) trains him. Honest and diligent Gandhian Raghunath gets very angry at this situation and demands that Chief Minister, Omiji, steps into the picture. When Omiji attempts to inquire into this, his son is incriminated for selling tainted glucose in hospitals, which caused several deaths. Powerless to act, Omiji hesitates, and as a result, Raghunath is killed. Thereafter, Jugnu returns, now a one-man army, willing to avenge his brother's death.

== Cast ==
- Salman Khan as Jugnu
- Karisma Kapoor as Shalu
- Ashok Saraf as Shevalal
- Prem Chopra as Sunderlal
- Aparajita as Widow
- Beena as Jyoti
- Suresh Bhagwat as Driver
- Pankaj Dheer as Vishal
- Mohan Joshi as Omiji
- A.K. Hangal as Raghunath
- Puneet Issar as Leader Paras of Tribal Group
- Satyajeet as Adivasi (Tribal Man)

== Music ==
Jaagruti

Studio album by Anand–Milind
- Released: 1992 (India)
- Genre: Feature film soundtrack
- Label: Venus Records and Tapes
- Producer: Anand–Milind

Anand–Milind chronology
Ek Ladka Ek Ladki (1992)	Jaagruti (1992)	Honeymoon (1992)

The soundtrack of the film contains 10 songs. The music is composed by Anand–Milind, with lyrics authored by Sameer.

#	Song	Singer(s)	Length
1	"Hawa Mein Kya Hai"	S. P. Balasubrahmanyam, K. S. Chithra	05:56
2	"Aayega Aayega" (Part 1)	Abhijeet, Suresh Wadkar, Kavita Krishnamurthy	05:21
3	"Chal Naujawan Aage Chal"	Amit Kumar	04:14
4	"He Param Pita Parmeshwar"	Sadhana Sargam	04:20
5	"Hum Saare Bekar"	Abhijeet, Jolly Mukherjee, Kavita Krishnamurthy	06:31
6	"Jalnewale To Jalte Rahenge"	S. P. Balasubrahmanyam, K. S. Chithra	05:09
7	"Na Na Na Aana"	Sapna Mukherjee	05:11
8	"Aayega Aayega" (Part 2)	Abhijeet, Suresh Wadkar, Kavita Krishnamurthy	01:42
9	"Hawa Mein Kya Hai" (Sad)	S.P Balasubrahmanyam, K. S. Chithra	01:43
10	"Hawa Mein Kya Hai" (Jhankar Beats)	S.P Balasubrahmanyam, K. S. Chithra	05:54
