= College Girl (1990 film) =

- Directed by: Surendra Gupta
- Produced by: Suresh Sharma
- Starring: Amita Nangia; Pankaj Berry; Veerendra Singh; Sudhir Pandey; Ajit Vachhani
- Music by: Babul Bose
- Release date: 1990
- Country: India
- Language: Hindi

College Girl is a 1990 Bollywood movie starring Amita Nangia, Pankaj Berry, Veerendra Singh, Pramod Moutho, Ajit Vachani, Sudhir Pandey, Vidyashree and Rajani Bala. The movie was directed by Surendra Gupta.

== Plot ==
Madhuri, Vicky and Aakash study together in college. Vicky, whose father is a minister, tries to woo her, but she falls for Aakash. Vicky introduces her to drugs through another girl. She becomes an addict. Aakash contests against Vicky in the student elections and wins. Furious, Vicky rapes Madhuri. Madhuri's brother Niranjan is reluctant to file a police complaint due to social fear. Her sister-in-law (Rekha), however, decides to go to the police when Aakash assures that he will stand by Madhuri. The police inspector tips off the minister before registering the case. The minister tries to persuade Rekha not to go ahead with the complaint, but she refuses. He brutally rapes Rekha in her bedroom and get both her and her husband killed. The court too absolves Vicky of the charge. Madhuri, with the help of Aakash, takes revenge by taking on Vicky, the minister and their accomplices, one by one.

== Cast ==
- Amita Nangia as Madhuri
- Pankaj Berry as Vicky
- Virendra Singh (actor) as Akash
- Sudhir Pandey as Digvijay Singh, the minister (Vicky's father)
- Ajit Vachhani as Inspector Salunke
- Pramod Moutho as Niranjan (Madhuri's brother)
- Vidyashree as Rekha (Madhuri's Bhabhi)
- Tiku Talsania
- Shreechand Makhija as Sinha, Digvijay Singh Secretary
- Rajni Bala
- Jay Kalgutkar as Rang Raj
- Manmauji
