= Ruchika Pandey =

Indian actress and designer

- Occupations: Film actress, Fashion designer

Ruchika Pandey is an Indian actress and fashion designer who acted in several Hindi films.

== Biography ==
She debuted in Mirza Brothers filmYaara Dildara was also released in 1991 where Aasif Sheikh was her co-star. She also appeared in Pyaar Ka Saudagar (1991) and Mr. Bond (1992), the latter alongside Akshay Kumar. She also appeared in Umar 55 Ki Dil Bachpan Ka in 1992.

Pandey is now living in Dubai and she is working there as a fashion designer. She lost AED 3,00,000 in 2018 following a SIM-swap fraud.

== Filmography ==
| Year | Film | Role |
|---|---|---|
| 1991 | Yaara Dildara | Rajni Yadav |
| 1991 | Pyaar Ka Saudagar | |
| 1992 | Mr. Bond | Neelam |
| 1992 | Umar 55 Ki Dil Bachpan Ka | Sonia |
