= Pyaar Ka Saaya =

1991 film by Vinod Verma

- Vinyl Record Cover
- Directed by: Vinod Verma
- Written by: Mushtaq Merchant (screenplay); Dr. Rahi Masoom Reza (dialogue)
- Produced by: Babbar Subhash
- Starring: Rahul Roy; Sheeba; Amrita Singh
- Cinematography: Aloke Dasgupta
- Edited by: Mangesh Chavan
- Music by: Nadeem-Shravan
- Release date: 6 December 1991
- Country: India
- Language: Hindi

Pyaar Ka Saaya (English: The Shadow of love) is a 1991 Indian Hindi-language romantic thriller film directed by Vinod Verma and starring Rahul Roy, Sheeba. It is an uncredited remake of the 1990 American movie, Ghost.

== Plot ==
Avinash Saxena lives with his uncle and cousin, Vimal. His grandfather passes away, leaving the estate to him, as he is aware that Vimal is a wastrel and alcoholic. Nevertheless, the two cousins get along quite well. When Avinash goes to visit one of his houses in the country side, he finds out that his servant, Ram Prasad, had let his bedroom to a young woman, Gloria, without his permission. After he meets Gloria both of them fall in love with each other and get married in a simple temple ceremony. They then return to the city, where Gloria, who is now Pooja, is introduced to Vimal. Then one night while returning home from a late night movie, the couple are attacked and Avinash is killed, leaving Pooja widowed and devastated. Then a few months later, Pooja is approached by a fortune-teller, Maya Gangadhami, who informs her that Avinash has been in touch with her and would like to console her as well as warn her that the man who killed him is also going to kill her also. Pooja ridicules this, and tells Vimal about this. What Pooja does not know is that Vimal himself was responsible for hiring the killer to kill Avinash so that he could inherit the estate and wealth as the sole surviving relative, and with no proof available of Pooja's marriage, all he has to do is arrange her "death" at the hands of the same killer.

== Cast ==
- Rahul Roy as Avinash Saxena "Avi" / Rakesh Saxena (Double Role)
- Sheeba as Pooja Saxena / Gloria
- Amrita Singh as Maya Saxena / Gangadhami
- Mohnish Behl as Vimal Saxena
- Avtar Gill as Raghav
- Brij Gopal as Robert
- Anant Mahadevan
- Babbanlal Yadav as Ram Prasad
- Ghanshyam Rohera as Maya's Client
- Ramesh Goyal as Corrupt Inspector

== Soundtrack ==
Pyaar Ka Saaya

Soundtrack album by Nadeem-Shravan
- Released: 1991
- Venue: Bombay
- Studio: Sunny Super Sound
- Genre: Feature film soundtrack
- Length: 37:59
- Label: Venus Records & Tapes
- Producer: Nadeem-Shravan

Nadeem-Shravan chronology
Phool Aur Kaante (1991)	Pyaar Ka Saaya (1991)	Sadak (1991)

The soundtrack of the movie was composed by the duo Nadeem-Shravan. The lyrics were written by Sameer. The soundtrack was released in 1991 by Venus Records & Tapes and Melody International Limited, which consists of 7 songs. Most popular songs in album "Teri Dosti Se" etc. Songs are sung by Kumar Sanu, Asha Bhosle, Vijay Benedict, Alisha Chinoy.

#	Song	Singer
1.	"Teri Dosti Se"	Kumar Sanu, Asha Bhosle
2.	"Aaja Aaja Aa Bhi Jaa"	Kumar Sanu, Alisha Chinoy
3.	"Pyaar Ka Saaya" (Duet)	Kumar Sanu, Asha Bhosle
4.	"Ek Phool Sa Chehra Hai"	Vijay Benedict
5.	"Pyaar Ka Saaya" (Male)	Kumar Sanu
6.	"Tu Chahat Hai"	Vijay Benedict, Alisha Chinoy
7.	"Tumse Thoda Sa"	Kumar Sanu, Asha Bhosle

== Reception ==
The film was said to be an uncredited remake of the Hollywood film Ghost (1990).
