= Tinnu Anand =

Indian actor, writer and director (b. 1945)

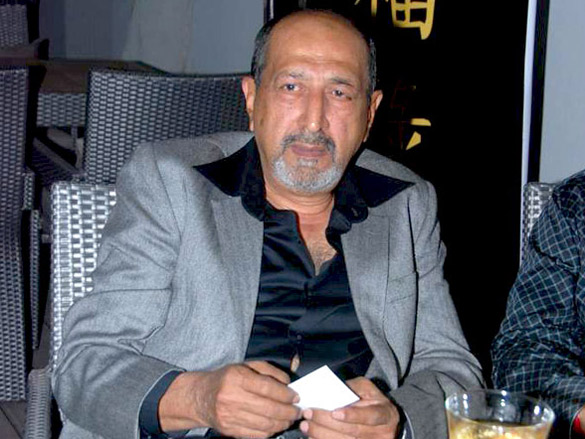
- Anand in 2011
- Born: Virender Raj Anand; 12 October 1945 (age 80); Peshawar, North-West Frontier Province, British Raj (present-day Khyber Pakhtunkhwa, Pakistan)
- Education: Mayo College
- Occupations: Actor; director; writer; producer
- Notable work: Shahenshah; Kaalia; Nayakan; Kaalapani; Salaar: Part 1 – Ceasefire; Anji
- Spouse: Shahnaz Anand
- Children: 2 (Isha Anand & Diksha Anand)
- Father: Inder Raj Anand
- Relatives: Siddharth Anand (nephew); Mukul Anand (cousin); Agha (father-in-Law); Jalal Agha (brother-in-law)

Tinu Anand (born Virender Raj Anand) is an Indian actor, director, writer and producer in Hindi cinema and a few Telugu and Tamil films.

== Personal life ==
He is the son of screenwriter Inder Raj Anand, brother of producer Bittu Anand, cousin of director Mukul Anand and uncle of director Siddharth Anand. He did his schooling from Mayo College in India. He is married to Shahnaz, daughter of veteran actor Agha.

== Career ==
His father, Inder Raj Anand, was a well-known writer in the Hindi film industry but did not want Tinnu Anand or his younger brother, Bittu Anand, to enter the profession. Recalling this period, Anand said that when he expressed his desire to direct films, his father was initially upset. However, he later accepted Anand’s determination and arranged for him to study under Satyajit Ray. Ray and Inder Raj Anand were friends, and Anand was subsequently taken under Ray’s mentorship.

Tinnu Anand was initially offered a role in K. Abbas' film Saat Hindustani. Recalling the incident, Anand said:

“In the evening, I was given the dirty job of offering Amitabh ₹5,000 for the entire film, whether it took a year or five. Amitabh reluctantly agreed, as he was desperate to act. He was given the role of the poet’s friend in Saat Hindustani. When my father received a letter from Satyajit Ray saying that I could work with him, I had to give up Saat Hindustani. I left for Calcutta, and Amitabh eventually got the role of the poet that I was supposed to play.”

Reflecting on working with actors who arrived late and worked limited hours, Anand said that he learned practical filmmaking techniques from action director Veeru Devgan. He recalled:

“I give all the credit to Veeru Devgan, who taught me how to unlearn what I had learnt. He told me that if you want to survive in this industry with actors like these, you should learn how to shoot a film when the actor is not there. I felt very proud when I once showed Amitabh a scene between him and Amjad Khan in a dubbing studio. He was shocked and said, ‘But I never shot with Amjad.’”

Anand worked as an assistant director to Satyajit Ray for nearly five years on several Bengali films, including Goopy Gyne Bagha Byne (1969), Aranyer Din Ratri (1970), Pratidwandi (1970), Seemabaddha (1971), and Ashani Sanket (1973).

In 2008, Anand portrayed a significant role in the Hindi film Ghajini.

In a later interview, Anand spoke about his early career and praised Amitabh Bachchan for his generosity and support during his formative years in the film industry.

== Fimography ==
=== As director ===
Year	Film	Notes
Director
1979	Duniya Meri Jeb Mein	
1981	Kaalia	Also writer
1984	Yeh Ishq Nahin Aasaan	
1988	Shahenshah	
1989	Main Azaad Hoon	
1991	Jeena Teri Gali Mein	
1998	Major Saab	
2003	Ek Hindustani	Unreleased
Assistant director
1969	Goopy Gyne Bagha Byne	Assisted Satyajit Ray
1970	Aranyer Din Ratri	Assisted Satyajit Ray
1970	Pratidwandi	Assisted Satyajit Ray
1971	Seemabaddha	Assisted Satyajit Ray
1973	Ashani Sanket	Assisted Satyajit Ray

=== As actor ===
==== Hindi films ====
Year	Film	Role	Notes
1987	Naam O Nishan	—	Only Writer
1988	Dayavan	Ajit Singh	
1990	Agneepath	Nathu	
1992	Mere Sajana Saath Nibhana	Dayal	
1992	Chamatkar	Kunta	
1992	Police Officer	Ram Kishan Verma	
1992	Khiladi	College Professor P.K. Mare	
1992	Balwaan	Police Commissioner Raj Sahni	
1993	Damini	Shekhar's maternal uncle	
1993	Kohra	Peter Gonsalves	
1993	Krishan Avtaar	Banarasi Das	
1993	Chandra Mukhi	Santala	
1994	Anjaam	Mohanlal	
1994	Fauj	Inspector Ramlakhan Yadav	
1994	Stuntman	Prem Kumar	
1994	Krantiveer	Yograj	
1995	Ram Jaane	Sameer Sanavla	
1995	Trimurti	Himmat Singh	
1996	Ghatak	Inspector	
1996	Krishna	Cobra	Also Writer
1996	Masoom	Mama	
1996	Army	Pancham	
1996	Papi Gudia	A Yadav / Ahulwalia Inspector in Doll Jail	Special Appearance
1996	Halo	Smuggler Raja	
1996	Diljale	Devotee of Vaishnodevi	
1997	Ek Phool Teen Kante	Yeda	Lead Role in a Comedy
1998	Share Bazaar	Mansukh	
1998	Miss 420	Khan / Mr Aluwalia	
1998	Kabhi Na Kabhi	Chhabile	
1998	China Gate	Capt. Bijon Dasgupta	
1998	Saat Rang Ke Sapne	Prahlad Sharma (Mahipal's Dad)	
2000	Hadh Kar Di Aapne	Mr. Khanna	
2000	Gang	Nagoba	
2001	Lajja	Purushotam	
2001	Chhupa Rustam	Mama Manikchand	
2002	Saathiya	Building Owner	
2002	Annarth	Dayal Bhai	
2002	Shararat	Saifuddin "Saifu"	
2003	Tumse Milke Wrong Number	Arti's uncle	
2004	Paisa Vasool	Uncle-Ji	
2004	Kyun! Ho Gaya Na...	Sandeep Malhotra	
2005	Bluffmaster!	Parimal Bajaj	
2006	Hindustan		
2007	Laaga Chunari Mein Daag	Rajshankar "Rajjo" Sahay	
2007	Salaam-e-Ishq: A Tribute to Love	Babu	
2008	Wafa: A Deadly Love Story	Police Commissioner	
2008	Ugly Aur Pagli	Mallika's Father	
2008	Ghajini	Satveer Kohli (Kalpana's Boss)	
2009	De Dana Dan	Himanshu Kakkar	
2009	Victory	Vedpal (Coach)	
2010	Khatta Meetha	Vishwas Rao	
2010	Dabangg	Shastri Master	
2011	Monica	Assem Ray	
2012	Tere Naal Love Ho Gaya	Bhatti	
2012	Dabangg 2	Shastri Master	
2013	Rabba Main Kya Karoon	Gujral Mama	
2013	Club 60	Ali Zafar aka Jaffar Bhai	
2013	Phata Poster Nikhla Hero	Director	
2014	Hasee Toh Phasee	Mukesh Adnani	
2015	Aisa Yeh Jahaan	Director	
2019	Saaho	Prithvi Raj	
2022	Janhit Mein Jaari	Dada-Ji	
2024	Merry Christmas	Yadhoom Uncle	
2025	Crazxy	Gurudutt Prasad	
2025	Dil Dosti Aur Dogs	Counsellor	

==== Other language films ====
Year	Film	Role	Language	Notes
1987	Pushpaka Vimana	Killer	Sound	Lead Role
1987	Nayakan	Ajith Kelkar	Tamil	
1991	Aditya 369	Prof. Ramdas	Telugu	
1994	Bombay	Sakthi Samaj Head	Tamil	
1995	Emergency		Kannada	
1995	Ghatotkachudu	Scientist	Telugu	
1996	Kaalapani	Ram Lakhan	Malayalam	
2004	Anji	Bhatia	Telugu	
2007	Framed	Professor	English	
2010	Gorosthaney Sabdhan	Marcus Goodwin	Bengali	
2011	Gosainbaganer Bhoot	Manmatha Ukil	Bengali	
2015	Puli	Sage	Tamil	
2019	Saaho	Prithvi Raj	Telugu	
2022	Sita Ramam	Anand Mehta	Telugu	
2023	Salaar: Part 1 - Ceasefire	Gaikwad alias "Baba"	Telugu	
2024	Lucky Baskhar	Rajbir Lokhande	Telugu	
2025	Good Bad Ugly	Mastaan Bhai	Tamil	
2026	Peddi	Vishnukant Tiwari	Telugu	

==== Television ====
Year	Title	Role
2007	Kahiin To Hoga	Mr. Ahluwalia
2026	Chiraiya	Nana
