= Sheeba Akashdeep Sabir =

Indian actress

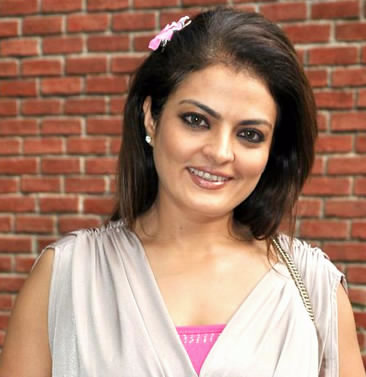
- Sheeba at Mondo Casa launch 2012
- Born: Sheeba Agarwal; Mumbai, Maharashtra, India
- Occupation: Actor
- Years active: 1990–present
- Spouse: Akashdeep Sabir (m. 1996)

Sheeba Akashdeep Sabir is an Indian actress who predominantly works in Hindi language films.

== Personal life and career ==
Sheeba born in a Agrawal Bania family. She married filmmaker Akashdeep Sabir in 1996; he directed her in films like Ghaath and Miss 420. She and her husband Akashdeep made a comeback as producers in the TV show Bhoot Aaya.

== Filmography ==
Year	Title	Role	Language	Notes
1990	Athisaya Piravi		Tamil	Debut Film
1991	Yeh Aag Kab Bujhegi	Pooja	Hindi	
1991	Nachnewale Gaanewale		Hindi	
1991	Pyaar Ka Saaya	Pooja Saxena	Hindi	
1992	Mr. Bond	Sunita	Hindi	
1992	Suryavanshi	Sonia	Hindi	
1992	Aasmaan Se Gira		Hindi	
1993	Boyfriend	Rani	Hindi	
1993	Hum Hain Kamaal Ke	Shallu	Hindi	
1993	Baarish		Hindi	
1994	Pyar Ka Rog	Reema Sharma	Hindi	
1994	Teesra Kaun	Herself	Hindi	Special appearance
1994	Zaalim		Hindi	
1995	Surakshaa	Diana	Hindi	
1995	Ravan Raaj: A True Story	Shilpa	Hindi	
1996	King Soloman	Aswathy	Malayalam	
1997	Lahu Ke Do Rang		Hindi	
1997	Share Bazaar	Inspector Kiran	Hindi	
1997	Kaalia		Hindi	
1997	Jeeo Shaan Se	Anamika	Hindi	
1998	Ajnabi Saaya		Hindi	
1998	Miss 420	Mohini Anamika / Shikha Sharma	Hindi	
1999	Kaala Samrajya	Chandni	Hindi	
1999	Pratidav		Marathi	
2000	Jwalamukhi		Hindi	Item Dancer
2000	Ghaath		Hindi	
2000	Bhootni		Hindi	
2003	Dum	Lakshmi Sharma	Hindi	
2009	Sanam Teri Kasam	Dr. Renu Mahinder Nath	Hindi	
2023	Rocky Aur Rani Kii Prem Kahaani	Mona Sen	Hindi	
2024	Jigra	Mrs. Mehtani	Hindi	
2025	Fateh		Hindi	
2025	Baaghi 4	Catherine	Hindi	
2025	Badaa Karara Pudna		Punjabi	

=== Television ===
Year	Serial	Role	Notes
2002	Kutumb	Kamini Aditya Maan	Season 2
2003–2004	Karishma - The Miracles of Destiny	Amrita	
2016	SauBhagyalaxmi	Bhairavi Birla	
2017–2018	Haasil	Sarika Jatin Raichand	
2022–2023	Naagin 6	Manjeet Kaur	
2023–2024	Baatein Kuch Ankahee Si	Pammi Sood	
