= Live India =

Indian Hindi-language news website

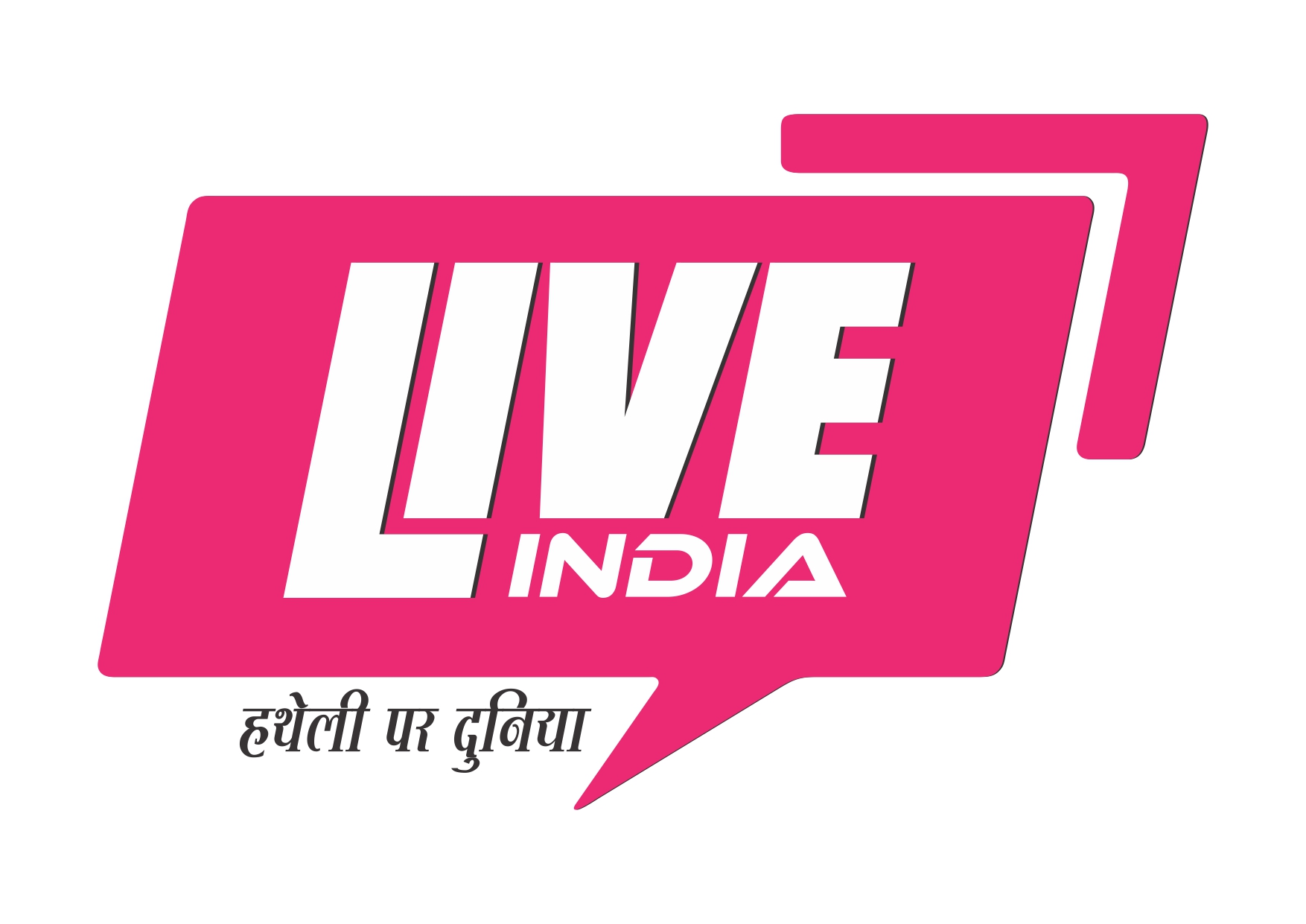
- Available in: Hindi
- Headquarters: Noida, {{{location_country}}}
- Owner: Quaint Media Consultant Pvt Ltd
- Website: www.liveindia.live
- Launched: February 2015

Live India is an Indian Hindi-language news and media website focusing on national news and viral content. Its headquarters is in Noida, India. The foundation of the news platform was laid by Union Cabinet Minister Ram Vilas Paswan and Union Cabinet Minister Najma Heptulla on 17 February 2015 at Constitution Club, New Delhi. Supriya Kanase and Basant Jha are the founders of the company. It is being run by Quaint Media Consultant Private Limited which is an Indian Company registered under the Companies Act 2013.

== Government ban ==
In 2007, the Indian government banned Live India for a month for breaching the Cable Networks Regulation Act of 1995, after the channel had run a doctored sting operation, broadcasting a false report about a porn racket being run by a school teacher. The report was ruled to be fake by a high court verdict.
