= Dilwale Kabhi Na Hare =

- Directed by: V.N. Menon
- Written by: Mahendra Dehlvi
- Produced by: Babubhai Thiba
- Starring: Rahul Roy; Prithvi; Nagma; Varsha Usgaonkar
- Cinematography: Mangesh Sawant
- Edited by: Padmakar Nirbhavani
- Music by: Nadeem-Shravan
- Distributed by: Sameer Productions
- Release date: 25 September 1992
- Running time: 150 minutes
- Country: India
- Language: Hindi

Dilwale Kabhi Na Hare is a 1992 Indian Hindi-language romance drama film directed by V. N. Menon and produced by Babubhai Thiba. It stars Rahul Roy, Prithvi, Nagma and Varsha Usgaonkar in pivotal roles.

== Plot ==
Rahul and Vijay becomes friends, after both of them saves each other getting framed in the murder case. Problems arise when they found out that they are in love with the same girl, Anjali. Rahul decides to sacrifice his love, while Vijay has something else in his mind.

== Cast ==
- Rahul Roy as Rahul
- Prithvi as Vijay
- Nagma as Anjali Oberoi
- Varsha Usgaonkar as Shabnam
- Satish Shah as Gene
- Girja Shankar as D. K. Oberoi
- Gajendra Chouhan as Shibu
- Rakesh Bedi as Pandit Aladdin Jagat Mama
- Guddi Maruti as Chintin
- Dinesh Anand as Inspector

== Soundtrack ==
The soundtrack of the movie was composed by the music duo Nadeem Shravan. The lyrics were written by Mahendra Dehlvi. The album became a hit and the songs "Hum Pyar Karte Hain", "Tu Meri Hai" and "Dilwale Kabhi Na Hare" were very popular. Most of the songs were sung by Kumar Sanu and Alka Yagnik, along with Shabbir Kumar, Nitin Mukesh and Rajeshwari.

No	Title	Singer(s)
1	"Hum Pyar Karte Hain"	Kumar Sanu, Alka Yagnik, Nitin Mukesh
2	"Dono Ke Husn Mein"	Kumar Sanu, Rajeshwari
3	"Tu Meri Hai"	Kumar Sanu, Alka Yagnik
4	"Dilwale Kabhi Na Hare"	Kumar Sanu, Shabbir Kumar
5	"Ab To Bina Tumhare"	Kumar Sanu
6	"Khushboo Tumhare Pyar Ki"	Kumar Sanu, Alka Yagnik
7	"Main Hoon Naarangi"	Alka Yagnik
