= Share Bazaar (film) =

- Directed by: Manmohan
- Starring: See below
- Music by: Utpal Biswas
- Release date: 1997
- Country: India
- Language: Hindi

Share Bazaar is a 1997 Hindi-language Bollywood crime thriller film, directed by Manmohan and released in 1997.

== Plot ==
In Mumbai's business district, on Dalal Street, stands a multi-storied building called the "Mumbai Stock Exchange" or the Share Bazaar. This is where fortunes are made and lost. Two of such traders in shares are the Mehta brothers, Hasmukh and Mansukh. They also manipulate people's lives and, this time, they have chosen to financially ruin Shekhar by getting him arrested on trumped-up charges. On the other hand, they have singled out a street-smart young man named Raj and persuaded him to take Shekhar's place.

== Cast ==
- Jackie Shroff as Jai
- Ravi Kishan as Shekhar
- Sheeba Akashdeep as Inspector Kiran
- Anupam Kher as Inspector Sharma
- Shammi Kapoor as Hansmukh Mehta
- Dimple Kapadia as Tara
- Imtiaz Khan as Roopesh
- Tinnu Anand as Mansukh Mehta
- C.S. Dubey as Money lender Vipin
- Jankidas as Parshuram
- Sudhir as Police Commissioner Jaichand Khurana

== Soundtrack ==
The music was composed by Utpal Biswas and released by Sony Music India.

Share Bazaar

Soundtrack album by Utpal Biswas
- Released: 1997
- Recorded: 1995
- Genre: Soundtrack
- Length: 31:24
- Label: Sony Music India
- Producer: Utpal Biswas

Track list
No.	Title	Lyrics	Singer(s)	Length
1.	"Mausam Hai Yeh Peenay Ka"	Sabir	Pankaj Udhas	7:12
2.	"O Neeli Ankhon Wali"	Sabir	Babul Supriyo, Mahalakshmi Iyer	5:03
3.	"Barsat Ki Raaton Mein"	Sabir	Sadhana Sargam	4:15
4.	"Pyar Ke Kabil To Samjha"	Sabir	Sadhana Sargam	4:31
5.	"Jaggu Ke Dil Mein Chori Hui"	Sabir	Bhavna Pandit, Vinod Rathod	4:26
6.	"Kismat Ne Likha Hai Kya"	Sabir	Bhavdeep Jaipurwale	1:09
7.	"Chitthi Na Aayee"	Srikant Mishra	Reema Dasgupta	4:48
Total length:				31:24
