= Hariprasad Chaurasia =

Indian flautist (born 1938)

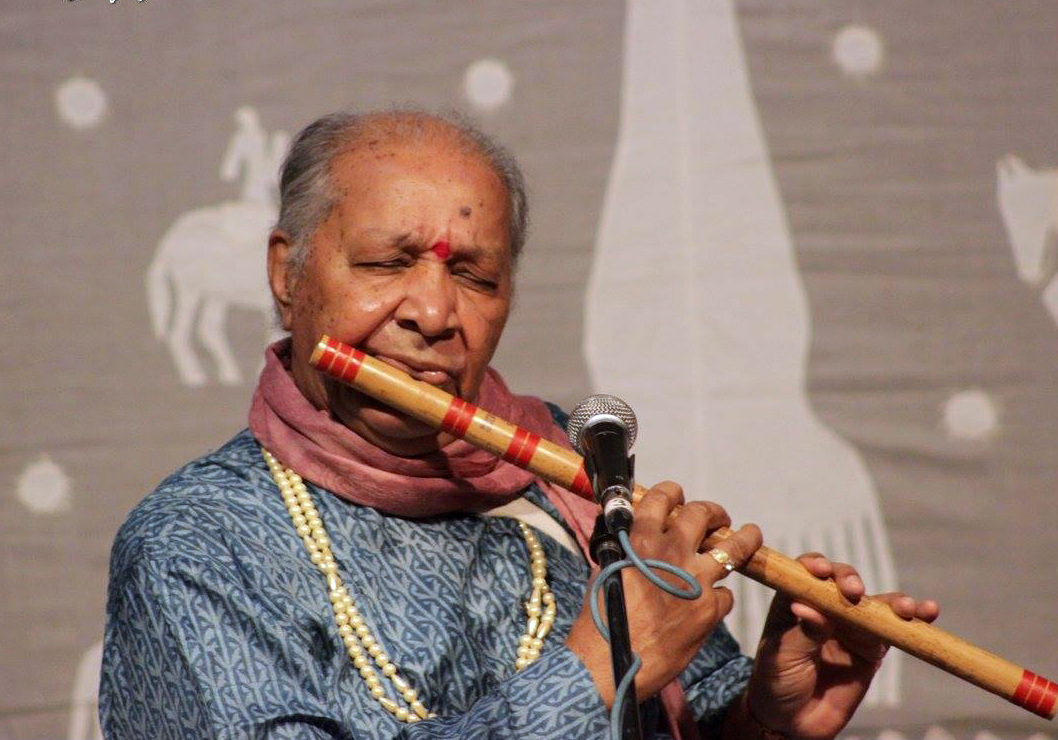
- Chaurasia performing in Bharat Bhavan, 2015.
- Born: 1 July 1938 (age 88); Allahabad, United Provinces, British India (present-day Prayagraj, Uttar Pradesh, India)
- Occupations: flautist, composer
- Years active: 1957–present
- Known for: Silsila (1981); Chandni (1989)
- Notable work: Call of the Valley (1968)
- Spouse(s): Kamala Devi; Anuradha Roy
- Children: 3
- Relatives: Rakesh Chaurasia (nephew)
- Awards: Padma Bhushan (1992); Padma Vibhushan (2000); Sangeet Natak Akademi Fellowship (2011)
- Musical career
- Genres: Hindustani classical music, film score
- Instrument: Bansuri
- Website: hariprasadchaurasia.com

Hariprasad Chaurasia (born 1 July 1938) is an Indian classical flautist and composer who plays the bansuri in the Hindustani classical tradition. Starting in the late 1950s, he developed the bansuri as a concert instrument through an approach drawing on vocal and instrumental techniques of Hindustani music, and became one of India's internationally known classical musicians.

Born into a family with no professional musical background, Chaurasia initially trained as a wrestler at the insistence of his father while secretly studying music. He began his professional career with All India Radio (AIR) in Cuttack in 1957 before being transferred to Bombay in 1962, where he became active in both classical music and the Hindi film industry. He later became a disciple of Annapurna Devi of the Maihar gharana. Alongside his classical career he worked extensively as a studio flautist, formed the film-composing partnership Shiv-Hari with santoor player Shivkumar Sharma producing notable filmscores like Silsila (1981) and Chandni (1989). He also collaborated with musicians including George Harrison, Zakir Hussain, John McLaughlin and Jan Garbarek.

He received the Sangeet Natak Akademi Award in 1984, the Padma Bhushan in 1992 and India's second highest civilian honour, the Padma Vibhushan in 2000. In 2011 he was elected a Fellow of the Sangeet Natak Akademi, its highest honour.

== Early life and education ==
Chaurasia was born in Allahabad (present day Prayagraj) in the United Provinces (present Uttar Pradesh). His mother died when he was six years old, after which he was brought up by his father, Chhedilal Pehelwan, who was a professional wrestler.< and his elder sister. He had to learn music without his father's knowledge, as his father wanted him to become a wrestler. Chaurasia did go to the Akhada and trained with his father for some time, although he also started learning stenography and Hindustani vocal music from his neighbour, Pandit Rajaram at the age of 15. Later, he switched to playing the flute under the tutelage of Bholanath Prasanna of Varanasi for eight years.

He has stated,

"I was not any good at wrestling. I went there only to please my father. But maybe because of the strength and stamina I built up then, I'm able to play the bansuri even to this day."

— Hariprasad Chaurasiaa

== Career ==
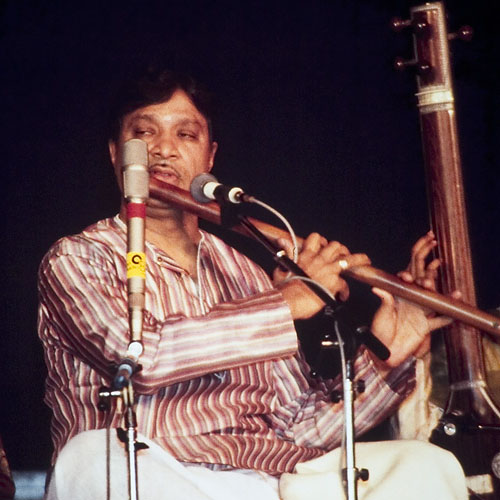
Hariprasad Chaurasia in concert, 1988

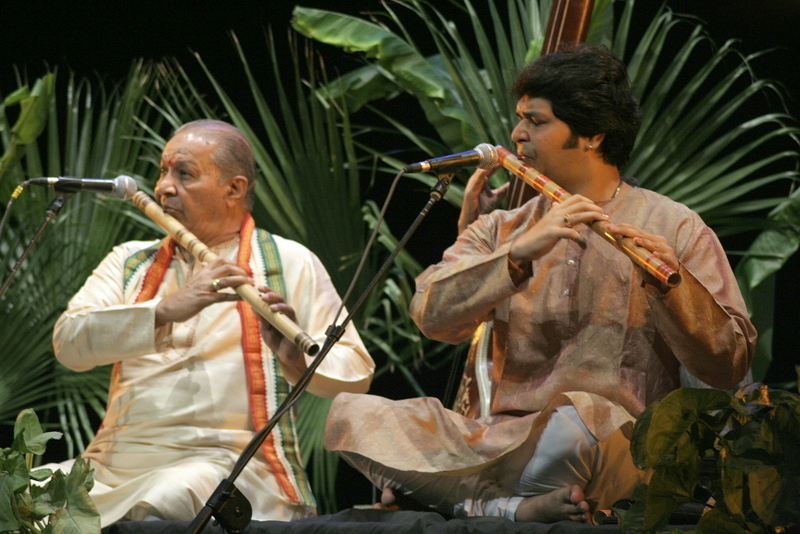
Hari Prasad and Rakesh Chaurasia in concert, 1999

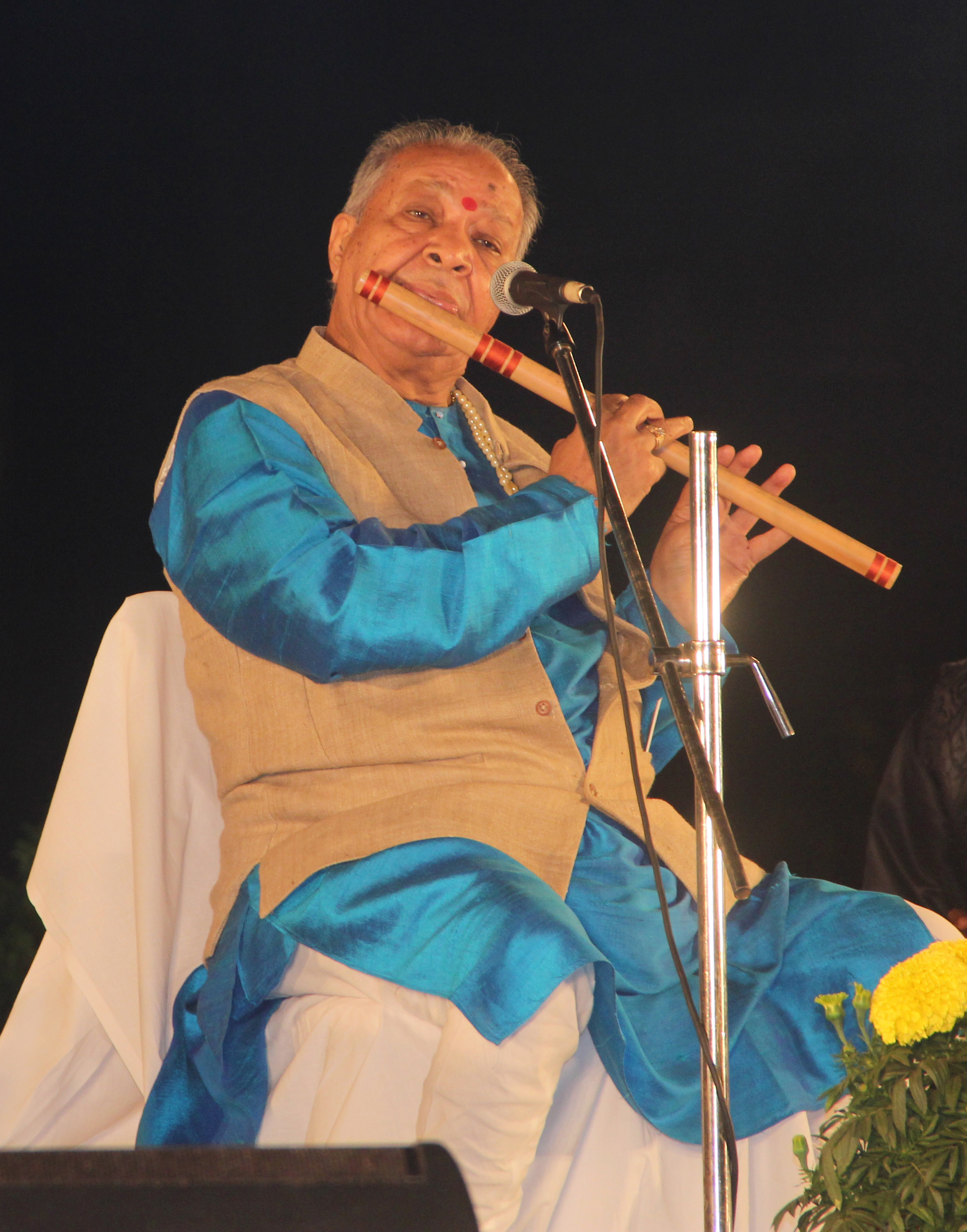
Hariprasad Chaurasia at Bhubaneswar, 2015

Chaurasia first worked as a stenographer in Allahabad while continuing to practise music privately. He joined the All India Radio, Cuttack, Odisha in 1957 and worked as a composer and performer. This relocation helped him him to leave Allahabad and pursue music as a profession. Here after working four year he was transferred to Mumbai. Much later, while working for All India Radio, he received guidance from the reclusive surbahar player Annapurna Devi of Maihar gharana, daughter of Baba Allaudin Khan. She only agreed to teach him if he was willing to unlearn all that he had learnt until then. Another version is that she only agreed to teach him after he took the decision to switch from right-handed to left-handed playing to show her his commitment. In any case Chaurasia plays left-handed to this day.

In 1967, Chaurasia, santoor player Shivkumar Sharma and slide guitarist Brij Bhushan Kabra recorded the instrumental album Call of the Valley, it marked the beginning of Chaurasia's long professional association with Sharma. The album was widely circulated in India and abroad and became one of the best-known recordings associated with the three musicians, and a milestone in world music. AllMusic reviewer Ken Hunt advises that "If the newcomer buys only one Indian classical recording, it should be "Call of the Valley"." It is listed in the book 1001 Albums You Must Hear Before You Die.

Starting 1970s, in a career stretching over six decades, Chaurasia toured locally and internationally extensively, as a soloist and in jugalbandi performances, performing at venues like Carnegie Hall, the Royal Albert Hall and the Kremlin.

=== Film music ===
Apart from classical music, Hariprasad has collaborated with Shivkumar Sharma, forming a composing duo called Shiv-Hari. The pair composed music for many popular movies, including Silsila and Chandni, and created some highly popular songs, such as "Dekha Ek Khwab", "Yeh Kahan Aa Gaye Hum", "Neela Aasman So Gaya" and "Rang Barse". The duo encouraged actor Amitabh Bachchan to sing in the film Silsila, including on song "Rang Barse".

Chaurasia also collaborated with Bhubaneswar Mishra, forming the pair "Bhuban-Hari" (in line with Shiv-Hari), and the pair composed music for many Odia films including Samaya (1975) and Gapa Hele Bi Sata (1976), creating numerous songs that were hugely popular in the state. These include Muje janena kaha baata (sung by Suman Kalyanpur; movie: Gapa helebi Sata); and all songs from Maa o Mamata, and many more.

=== International collaborations ===
He has collaborated with several western musicians, including John McLaughlin, Jan Garbarek, and Ken Lauber, and has composed music for Indian films. Chaurasia also played on The Beatles' 1968 B-side "The Inner Light", which was written by George Harrison. He also played with George Harrison on his first solo release, Wonderwall Music, and with Harrison, Ravi Shankar and others on the Dark Horse Records release Shankar Family & Friends (1974). In December 1986 he recorded Making Music (1987) with tabla player Zakir Hussain, guitarist John McLaughlin and Norwegian saxophonist Jan Garbarek, it featured improvisations both in Hindustani and European music.

In 1997, Chaurasia participated in the revived version of John McLaughlin's Indo-jazz group Shakti, known as Remember Shakti, and took part in its series of concerts in the United Kingdom.

== Musical style ==
Chaurasia's playing is known for its lyrical, voice-like quality and for bringing the bansuri into the extended form of Hindustani classical music, with detailed alap, jor and jhala. An key influence on his style was his training under Annapurna Devi of the Maihar gharana. As she was not a flute player, she taught him by singing the musical phrases and ideas she wanted him to learn, which Chaurasia then reproduced on the flute. Chaurasia later explained that this taught him to think of the flute simply as a medium for expressing music, rather than limiting himself to techniques specific to the instrument. Through continued experimentation, he expanded the expressive range of the bansuri while retaining an emphasis on melody, emotion and the development of the raga. The Sangeet Natak Akademi, India's National academy for Performing arts, credited him with evolving a distinctive style of flute playing and establishing himself among India's leading classical musicians.

His melodic approach also helped make his music accessible to audiences beyond specialist classical music listeners. Although his career has included film music and collaborations with jazz and world music musicians, Chaurasia has maintained that experimentation should remain grounded in a strong understanding of classical music.

== Teaching ==
Teaching became an increasingly important part of Chaurasia's later career, especially in the traditional guru–shishya model. In 2002 he established the Vrindaban Gurukul in Mumbai with support from the Sir Ratan Tata Trust, and formally inaugurated with an overnight concert around Krishna Janmashtami in 2002. A second Vrindaban Gurukul opened in Bhubaneswar in 2010.

Chaurasia's nephew and pupil Rakesh Chaurasia is also a flautist, and has been performing with artists such as Zakir Hussain.

In 1991, he was appointed as the artistic director of the Indian music section in World Music Department at the Rotterdam Conservatory of Music in the Netherlands. A role he continued even when the conservatory was incorporated into Codarts. In 2008, the Netherlands appointed him an "Officer of the Order of Orange-Nassau" for his musical contribution, presented by Princess Máxima.

== Personal life ==
Chaurasia has married twice, first to Kamala Devi, whom he married around 1957. His second marriage after a few years, was with Anuradha Roy, a classical vocalist who he met while working a AIR Cuttack. He has three sons. With first wife Kamala Devi he has two sons, Vinay and Ajay. With Anuradha, Chaurasia has a son named Rajeev. Chaurasia has five granddaughters and a grandson. Kamala Devi died in her early forties after a period of illness.

In 2010, the chronology of Chaurasia's two marriages became the subject of a legal dispute, when his sons Vinay and Ajay Chaurasia, from his marriage to Kamala Devi, filed a defamation suit in Bombay High Court (Vinay Kumar Chaurasia & Anr. v. Pandit Hariprasad Chaurasia & 3 Ors.) against Chaurasia and biographer Surjit Singh, alleging that the authorised biography Woodwinds of Change misrepresented the order of his marriages by suggesting that he married Kamala after Anuradha "Angurbala" Roy, which they argued implied that they were illegitimate. They sought ₹1 lakh in token damages and an injunction against further publication of the biography; the Bombay High Court declined to grant an interim restraint in March 2010, although the suit continued. The family dispute resurfaced in 2013 after the release of the documentary Bansuri Guru, directed by Chaurasia's son Rajeev Chaurasia. Vinay Chaurasia criticised the film for omitting his mother Kamala Devi, meanwhile their previous their lawsuit concerning Woodwinds of Change still continued. In 2026, The Indian Express similarly noted that the biographical musical Bansuri Jab Gaane Lage, written by Chaurasia's daughter-in-law Pushpanjali and produced by Rajeev, portrayed several women important to his life but omitted Kamala Devi and their two sons.

His nephew Rakesh Chaurasia is also a flautist and carrying forward the family legacy.

== In popular culture ==
The 2013 documentary film Bansuri Guru features the life and legacy of Chaurasia and was directed by the musician's son Rajeev Chaurasia and produced by the Films Division Ministry of Information and Broadcasting, Government of India. A 2026 stage musical Bansuri Jab Gaane Lage based on his life and career was produced by his family members.

== Awards and honours ==
- Sangeet Natak Academi Award - 1984
- Konark Samman - 1992
- Padma Bhushan - 1992
- Yash Bharati Samman - 1994
- Padma Vibhushan - 2000
- Pandit Chatur Lal Excellence Award - 2015
- Hafiz Ali Khan Award - 2000
- Dinanath Mangeshkar Award - 2000
- Pune Pandit Award - 2008, by The Art & Music Foundation, Pune, India
- Akshaya Samman - 2009
- Honorary Doctorate, North Orissa University - 2008
- Honorary Doctorate, Utkal University - 2011
- Sangeet Natak Akademi Fellowship (Ratna Sadasya) – 2011
- National Eminence award, NADA VIDYA BHARTI by Visakha Music and Dance Academy, Vizag - 2009
- The 25 Greatest Global Living Legends In India by NDTV - 2013
- Gansamradni Lata Mangeshkar Award - 2021-22
- Lokmat Sur Jyotsna National Music Award 2023 Legend Award for his contribution to Indian music

== Discography ==
=== Albums ===
These are major albums released by Hariprasad Chaurasia

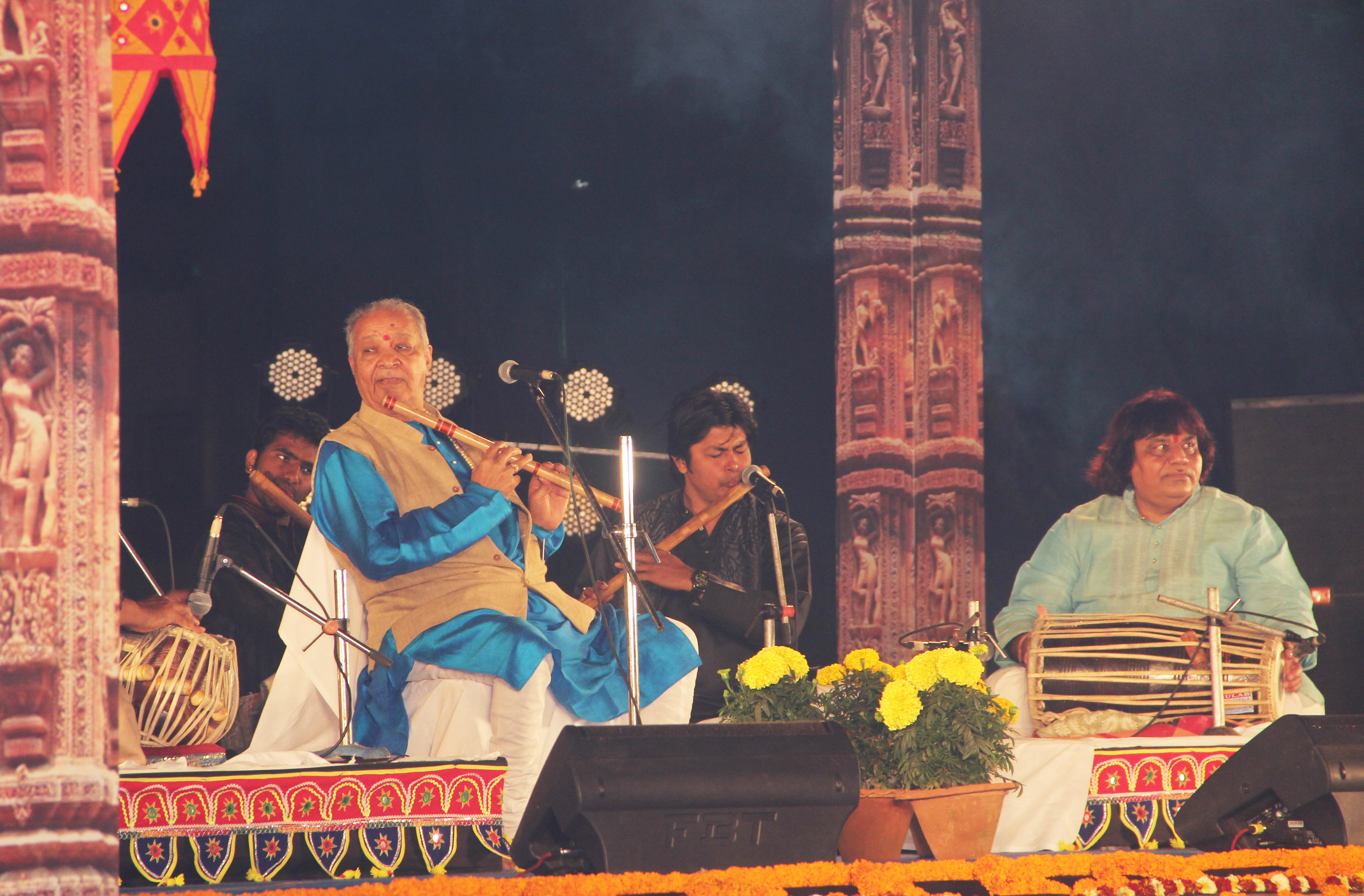
Pandit ji Performing at Rajarani Music Fest 2015, Bhubaneswar, Odisha

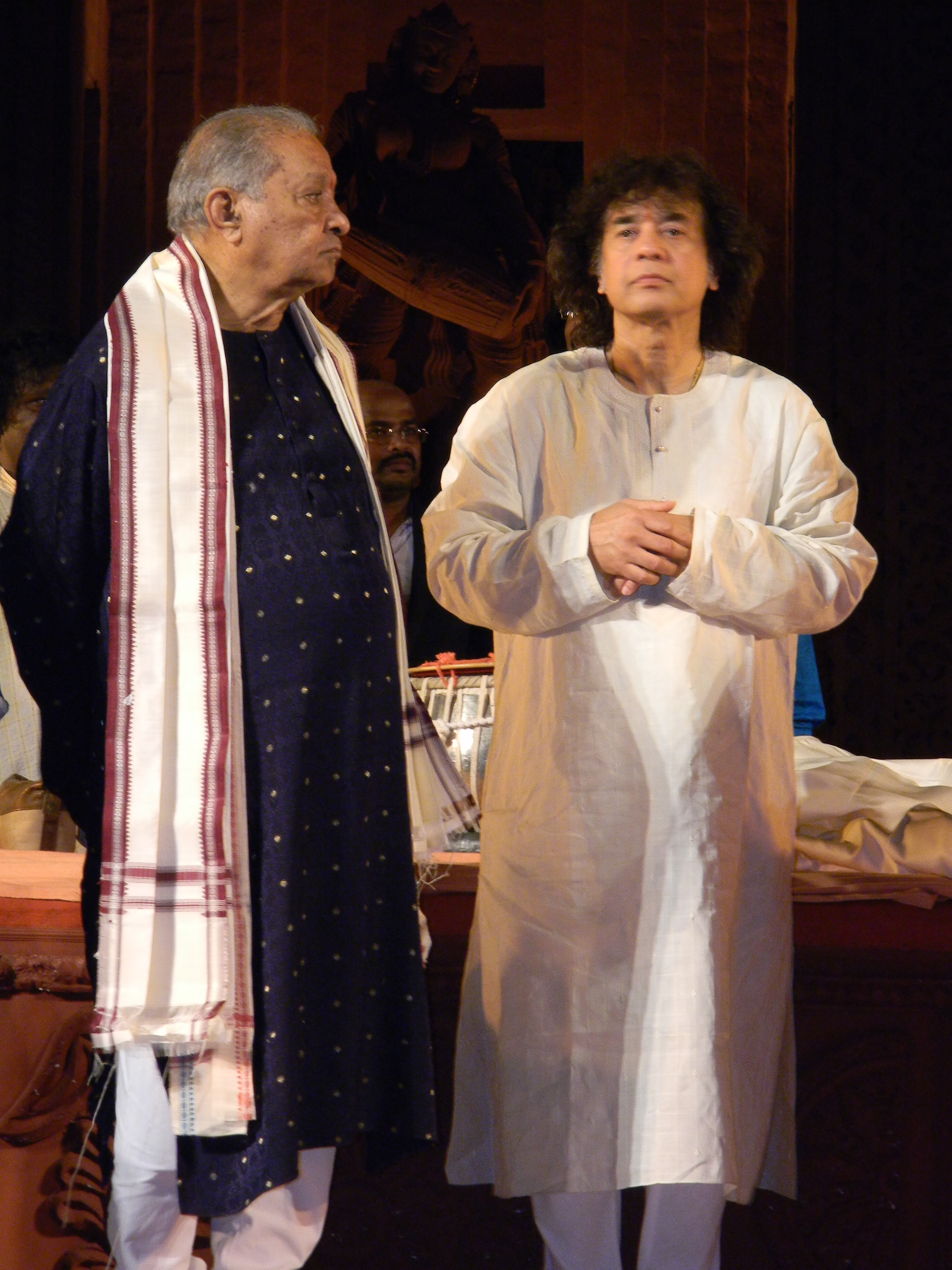
With Ustad Zakir Hussain (2012)

1967

- Call of the Valley with Shivkumar Sharma and Brij Bhushan Kabra

1978

- Krishnadhwani 60

1981

- Pt. Hariprasad Chaurasia - Flute

1984

- Pt. Hariprasad Chaurasia - Flute (different set of ragas, same album name)

1987

- Morning to Midnight Ragas - Morning Ragas

1988

- Nothing But Wind - Composed by the renowned musician "Isaignani" Ilaiyaraaja
- Call of the Valley

1989

- Venu
- Live in Ahmedabad '89

1990

- Immortal Series

1991

- Megh Malhar

1992

- Night Ragas
- Live in Amsterdam '92
- Morning to Midnight Ragas - Afternoon Ragas
- All time Favourites
- Live from Sawai Gandharva Music Festival - Video (VHS)
- Raga-s DU Nord Et Du Sud
- Immortal Series - Flute Fantasia

1993

- Indian Classical Masters
- Daylight Ragas
- Flute - Hariprasad Chaurasia
- Soundscapes - Music of the Rivers - Hari Prasad Chaurasia

1994

- Thumri - The Music of Love
- In A Mellow Mood
- Possession
- Immortal Series - Devine Drupad
- Classic Greats1 - Ideas on Flute

1995

- In Live Concert
- Cascades of Hindustani Music
- Maharishi Gandharva Veda - Pandit Hari Prasad Chaurasia - 4 am to 7 am Raga Bhairava: Integration
- Maharishi Gandharva Veda - Pandit Hari Prasad Chaurasia - 7 am to 10 am Raga Gurjari Todi: Compassion
- Maharishi Gandharva Veda - Pandit Hari Prasad Chaurasia - 10 am to 1 pm Raga Vrindavani Saranga: Greater Energy
- Maharishi Gandharva Veda - Pandit Hari Prasad Chaurasia - 1 pm to 4 pm Raga Multani: Affuence
- Maharishi Gandharva Veda - Pandit Hari Prasad Chaurasia - 4 pm to 7 pm Raga Marwa: Coherence
- Maharishi Gandharva Veda - Pandit Hari Prasad Chaurasia - 7 pm to 10 pm Raga Desh: Joy
- Maharishi Gandharva Veda - Pandit Hari Prasad Chaurasia - 10 pm to 1 am Raga Abhogi: Peaceful Slumber
- Maharishi Gandharva Veda - Pandit Hari Prasad Chaurasia - 1 am to 4 am Raga Sindhu Bhairavi: Gentleness
- Hariprasad Chaurasia - Flute
- Malhar-Chandrika
- Music 157 - Live in London
- Music - Flute
- Great Jugalbandis
- Music from the world of OSHO - Above & Beyond
- Prem Yog
- Written on the Wind
- Romantic Themes
- Saptarishi - Live at Siri Fort
- The Mystical Flute of Hari Prasad Chaurasia
- Maestro's Choice
- Basant Bahar
- Chaurasia's Choice

1996

- Hari Prasad Chaurasia & his Divine Flute
- Flute Recital
- Valley Recalls - In search of Peace, Love and Harmony
- Krishna's Flute - Master of the Bansuri
- Classical Encounters - A live Experience with Pt. Hari Prasad Chaurasia
- Fabulous Flute
- Pundit Hari Prasad Chaurasia
- In Concert - Vancouver, B.C
- Hariprasad Chaurasia - Flute
- The Bamboo Flautist of His Generation
- Pt. Hariprasad Chaurasia - Nada in Jerusalem

1997

- Classical Encounters - A Live Experience with Pt. Hariprasad Chaurasia
- Great Jugalbandis
- The Golden Collection (Classical)
- Immortal Essence
- Golden Raga Collection
- Bustan Abraham - Fanar (Guest appearance alongside Zakir Hussain)

1998

- Samarpan-VCD Special 60th Birthday Edition
- The Charms Companion
- Morning to Midnight - Morning to Dusk
- Music for Reiki

1999

- Jugalbandi
- Rasdhaara
- Live Inside Khajuraho
- Live in New Delhi - '89
- Golden Raga Collection
- Musical Titans of India - Jugalbandhi Video (VHS)
- Pure Joy - Positive Energy Music

2000

- Music without Boundaries
- Maaya - Far East
- Hriday - Cuba
- Caravan Spain
- Live Concert at Savai Gandharva Music Festival
- Gurukul - The Guru shishya Parampara

2001

- Adi-Ananth
- Love Divine - Parables of Passion
- Power & Grace - Live at the Saptak Festival 2001
- Discovery of Indian Classical Music
- Flute Duet

2003

- Flute Deity Hariprasad Chaurasia
- The Greatest Hits of Hariprasad Chaurasia
- Salvation - Instrumental Bhajans
- Sounds of Silence

2015

Ajanma - Hariprasad Chaurasia (Solo album)

Year unknown

- La Flute De Pundit Hariprasad Chaurasia
- Hariprasad Chaurasia - The Most Celebrated Flautist of India
- Charm of the Bamboo flute
- Kalpana - Imagination
- A Kaleidoscope of various ragas
- Krishna Utsav
- Kali - Classical Instrumental
- Pt. Hariprasad Chaurasia - the Living Legend of Flute
- Moon Light Moods - Flute Recital
- Pt. Hariprasad Chaurasia - The Living Legend of Flute
- Indian Music
- HariDhwani
- Dancing Water
- Fusion India - Passage of India Series
- Being Still
- Dhammapada - Sacred teaching of Buddha
- The Charms Companion
- Eternity
- Nothing but wind (1988) - Composed by Ilaiyaraaja

With Zakir Hussain

- Making Music (ECM, 1986)
- Maharishi Gandharva Veda - Pandit Hari Prasad Chaurasia - 4 am to 7 am Raga Bhairava
- Maharishi Gandharva Veda - Pandit Hari Prasad Chaurasia - 7 am to 10 am Raga Jaita
- Maharishi Gandharva Veda - Pandit Hari Prasad Chaurasia - 10 am to 1 pm Raga Ahir Lalita
- Maharishi Gandharva Veda - Pandit Hari Prasad Chaurasia - 1 pm to 4 pm Raga Samanta Saranga
- Maharishi Gandharva Veda - Pandit Hari Prasad Chaurasia - 4 pm to 7 pm Raga Puriya Dhanashri
- Maharishi Gandharva Veda - Pandit Hari Prasad Chaurasia - 7 pm to 10 pm Raga Maru Bihaga
- Maharishi Gandharva Veda - Pandit Hari Prasad Chaurasia - 10 pm to 1 am Raga Gunji Kanada
- Maharishi Gandharva Veda - Pandit Hari Prasad Chaurasia - 1 am to 4 am Raga Shuddha Vasanta

Contributing artist

- The Rough Guide to the Music of India and Pakistan (World Music Network, 1996)

=== Films ===
==== Hindi ====
Along with Shivkumar Sharma he composed music for:

- Silsila (1981)
- Faasle (1985)
- Vijay (1988)
- Chandni (1989)
- Lamhe (1991)
- Parampara (1993)
- Darr (1993)
- Sahibaan (1993)

==== Telugu ====
The music for the film Sirivennela (1986) was composed by K. V. Mahadevan which revolves around the role of Hari Prasad, a blind flautist played by Sarvadaman Banerjee and flute renditions by Chaurasia.

==== English ====
Some of his music was used in Mithaq Kazimi's 16 Days in Afghanistan (2007).

== Biblliography ==
- Vasudev, Uma (2005). Hariprasad Chaurasia: Romance of the Bamboo Reed. Shubhi Publications. ISBN 978-81-8290-042-4.
- Singh, Surjit (2008). Woodwinds of Change: The Authorised Biography of Padmavibhushan Hariprasad Chaurasia. Richa's Enterprise. ISBN 978-81-906927-0-0.
- Tournier, Henri (2010). Hariprasad Chaurasia et l'art de l'improvisation: Découverte pas à pas de la musique de l'Inde du Nord. Accords Croisés–Harmonia Mundi.
- Tournier, Henri. Hariprasad Chaurasia and the Art of Improvisation* Saran, Sathya (2019). Breath of Gold: Hariprasad Chaurasia. Penguin.
- Singh, Surjit (2010).Bansuri Samrat : Hariprasad Chaurasia (Hindi). Prabhat Prakashan. ASIN:B071XMLL7F.

== See also ==
- Annapurna Devi
- Shivkumar Sharma
- Shiv-Hari
- Remember Shakti
