= Baghban (soundtrack) =

Soundtrack album by Aadesh Shrivastava
- Released: 23 August 2003
- Genre: Feature film soundtrack
- Length: 52:47
- Language: Hindi
- Label: T-Series
- Producer: Aadesh Shrivastava

Aadesh Shrivastava chronology
Chalte Chalte (2003)	Baghban (2003)	Dev (2004)

Baghban is the soundtrack album to the 2003 film of the same name directed by Ravi Chopra and produced by his father B. R. Chopra starring Amitabh Bachchan and Hema Malini. The soundtrack featured nine songs composed by Aadesh Shrivastava with lyrics written by Sameer, and was released under the T-Series label on 23 August 2003 to positive reviews.

== Development ==
The film was initially set to be composed by Uttam Singh who had worked on two songs but left the project due to undisclosed reasons. Later, the producers discussed with Aadesh Shrivastava to score for the film; Shrivatsava sent an NOC letter to Singh, so that he could proceed working on the film, and later signed the project after Singh's approval. Sameer served as the primary lyricist for the songs.

Baghban was one of his few outings Shrivatsava had signed as he focused on being the sole composer, refraining offers for composing background scores and being part of multi-composer soundtracks. Shrivatsava admitted that the film "gave me a chance to show my versatility" as he composed a variety of songs for the film. He composed a Holi song "Holi Khele Raghuveera" with lyrics based on a poem written by Bachchan's father Harivansh Rai Bachchan and has a flavor of Uttar Pradesh in its music. Being an ardent fan of Bachchan and with whom he had shared a working relationship for two decades, Shrivatsava insisted him on singing vocals for the track instead of his norm playback singer Sudesh Bhosale as he wanted the actor "to convey much more [...] right emotions", although Bachchan was initially unwilling. Bachchan had then sung most of the songs in the film, which was complimented by Shrivatsava for his passionate singing.

Udit Narayan, Alka Yagnik, Shrivastava, Hema Sardesai, Sudesh Bhosale, Richa Sharma, Sneha Pant, and Sukhwinder Singh also performed the vocals. Shrivatsava initially planned to record a song with Pakistani Sufi singer Abida Parveen but refrained from finishing the recording as he felt it did not work. The song "O Dharti Tarse Amber Berse" was then recorded by Sharma with Bachchan. T-Series released the album on 3 September 2003.

== Reception ==
The soundtrack received positive response from music critics. A Hindu reviewer called Bachchan the album's highlight and praised all the songs; "Holi Khele Raghuveera" resembled "Rang Barse Bhige Chunar Wali" from the romantic drama film Silsila (1981). In a mixed review for Mid-Day, Narendra Kusnur called the album "a good break" for Shrivastava but felt that the instrumental version of "Main Yahan Tu Wahan" was "far too lengthy". Joginder Tuteja of Bollywood Hungama gave the album three-and-a-half out of five stars, saying that it had no songs "that can be singled out to be 'not good'".

Seema Pant of Rediff.com commended Shrivatsava for "making Bachchan sound so wonderful in the songs", while Ram Kamal Mukherjee of Stardust complimented it as "euphonious". Pant and Mukherjee added that his singing on "Main Yahan Tu Wahan" brought back memories of Mahaan (1983) where he sings "Jidhar Dekhoon Teri Tasveer" to Waheeda Rehman on the phone. Parag Chandrabala Maniar, in her review for B4U called Shrivatsava's tunes "hummable". In contrast, Parul Gupta of The Times of India admitted that the soundtrack "disappoints" and Shrivatsava "fails to lift the tunes, making it below average".

According to the Box Office India website, Baghban's soundtrack album was the year's ninth bestselling with 1.4 million units sold. Shrivastava told journalist Salma Khatib of Screen that "Holi Khele Raghuveera" was popular in Madhya Pradesh and Uttar Pradesh.

== Track listing ==
Baghban (Original Motion Picture Soundtrack)
No.	Title	Lyrics	Singer(s)	Length
1.	"Pehle Kabhi Na Mera Haal"	Sameer	Udit Narayan, Alka Yagnik	4:39
2.	"Chali Chali Phir" (Reprise)	Sameer	Aadesh Shrivastava, Hema Sardesai	1:41
3.	"Main Yahan Tu Wahan"	Sameer	Amitabh Bachchan, Sudesh Bhosle, Alka Yagnik	7:03
4.	"Meri Makhna Meri Soniye"	Sameer	Amitabh Bachchan, Sudesh Bhosale, Alka Yagnik	7:00
5.	"Chali Chali Phir"	Sameer	Amitabh Bachchan, Sudesh Bhosle, Aadesh Shrivastava, Hema Sardesai, Alka Yagnik	4:57
6.	"O Dharti Tarse Amber Berse"	Sameer	Amitabh Bachchan, Sudesh Bhosle, Richa Sharma	10:10
7.	"Holi Khele Raghuveera"	Harivansh Rai Bachchan	Amitabh Bachchan, Sudesh Bhosle, Sukhwinder Singh, Alka Yagnik, Udit Narayan	5:39
8.	"Meri Makhna Meri Soniye" (Instrumental)	Sameer		7:00
9.	"Om Jai Jagdish" (Arti)	Sameer	Udit Narayan, Sneha Pant	3:38
Total length:				52:47

== Accolades ==
Award	Category	Recipient(s)	Result	Ref.
International Indian Film Academy Awards	Best Lyricist	Sameer (for "Main Yahan Tu Wahan")	Nominated	
International Indian Film Academy Awards	Best Male Playback Singer	Amitabh Bachchan (for "Main Yahan Tu Wahan")	Nominated	
Zee Cine Awards	Best Playback Singer – Male	Sudesh Bhosale (for "Meri Makhna Meri Soniye")	Nominated	
Zee Cine Awards	Best Re-recording	Kuldeep Sod	Nominated	
