= Shivkumar Sharma =

Indian classical musician and composer (1938–2022)

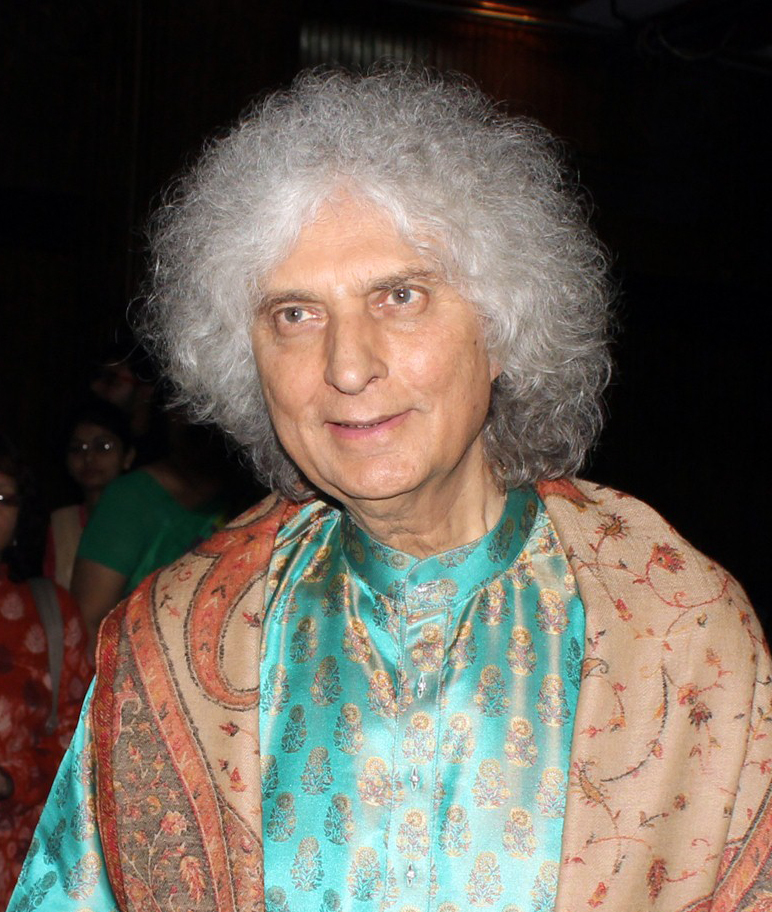
- Sharma in 2016

Background information
- Born: 13 January 1938; Jammu, Jammu and Kashmir, British India
- Died: 10 May 2022 (aged 84) Mumbai, Maharashtra, India
- Genre: Hindustani classical music
- Occupations: Musician; composer
- Instruments: Santoor; tabla
- Years active: 1955–2022
- Website: santoor.com

Shivkumar Sharma (13 January 1938 – 10 May 2022) was an Indian classical musician and santoor player who is credited with adapting the santoor for Indian classical music. As a music composer, he collaborated with Indian flautist Hariprasad Chaurasia under the collaborative name Shiv–Hari and composed music for such hit Indian films as Faasle (1985), Chandni (1989), and Lamhe (1991).

Sharma was awarded the Sangeet Natak Akademi Award in 1986 and the Padma Shri and Padma Vibhushan (India's fourth and second highest civilian awards) in 1991 and 2001.

== Early life ==
Sharma was born to a Dogra family of the Brahmin caste, on 13 January 1938, in Jammu, in the princely state of Jammu and Kashmir in British India (now in Jammu and Kashmir, India).

Shivkumar's grandfather was the Rajpurohit (chief priest) of the royal temple of Pratap Singh, the king of the princely state of Jammu and Kashmir. His father Umadutt Sharma was a vocalist and a tabla player. His father started teaching him vocals and tabla, when he was just five. His father saw an opportunity to introduce him to the santoor, a hammered dulcimer, which was a folk instrument of Kashmir, and as per Sharma was known as Shatatantri Veena (transl. 100-wired instrument) in the Vedic period.

Sharma spent his early years in Srinagar and saw the styles that integrated Sufi notes with traditional Kashmiri folk music and had his son play the instrument that was then new to Indian classical music. Sharma started learning santoor at the age of thirteen and gave his first public performance in Mumbai in 1955. The one-hour-long rendition of Raga Yaman at his first live performance in 1955, left his audience in Mumbai shouting ‘Encore!’

== Career ==
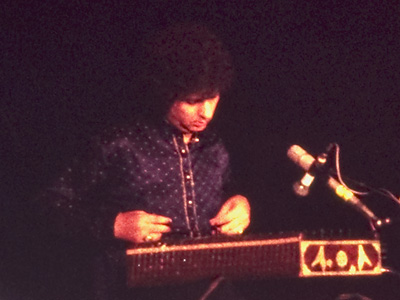
Sharma in 1988

Starting his career playing the santoor with his father, Sharma is credited with introducing the santoor as a popular Indian classical music instrument. He recorded his first solo album in 1960. Sharma took the santoor as an Indian classical musical instrument playing at various music venues. He collaborated with Indian tabla player Zakir Hussain and with flautist Hariprasad Chaurasia on many of his performances as well as on his albums. In 1967, he teamed up with Chaurasia and guitarist Brij Bhushan Kabra to produce a concept album, Call of the Valley (1967), which turned out to be one of Indian classical music's greatest hits.

Sharma composed the background music for one of the scenes in V. Shantaram's film Jhanak Jhanak Payal Baje (1955) where Gopi Krishna performed a Kathak dance piece. Further, he composed music for many Hindi films in collaboration with Chaurasia, starting with Silsila (1981). They came to be known as the Shiv–Hari music duo. Some of the movies they composed music for were musical hits, such as Faasle (1985), Chandni (1989), Lamhe (1991), and Darr (1993). Sharma also played tabla including in the popular song "Mo Se Chhal Kiye Jaaye" sung by Lata Mangeshkar in the 1965 film Guide, on the insistence of music director S. D. Burman. However, Sharma's focus remained on classic music rather than film songs; he said, "Classical music is not for entertainment. It is to take you on a meditative journey, ye toh mehsoos karne ki cheez hai (This has to be experienced)." Sharma’s 1968 concert in Los Angeles was his first performance abroad. He followed this with a tour of England in 1970. In 1996, Sharma and his son Rahul played the santoor on a stage in Norway, as 'equals' for the first time.

Sharma was awarded the Sangeet Natak Akadeemi Award in 1986, the Padma Shri, India's fourth highest civilian award in 1991, and the Padma Bhushan, India's third highest civilian award in 2001.

== Personal life ==
Sharma married Manorama and had two sons, Rohit, who learned Sitar and is currently an executive with Sony India and Rahul, who started learning at the age of 13 to become a santoor player, and they performed together since 1996. In a 1999 interview, Sharma stated that he chose Rahul as his shishya, because he thought he had the "gift of God". He became a staunch devotee and follower of Sathya Sai Baba after starting off as a sceptic.

Sharma died on 10 May 2022 from a cardiac arrest. He was 84 years old. He had kidney failure for the last few months and went through regular dialysis. He received a state funeral at Pawan Hans Juhu aerodrome, Mumbai, on 11 May 2022.

== Discography ==
=== Albums ===
Year	Title	Notes
1964	Santoor & Guitar	with Brij Bhushan Kabra
1967	Shivkumar Sharma	(re-released 2005 as "First LP Record of Pandit Shivkumar Sharma"
1967	Call of the Valley	with Brij Bhushan Kabra and Hariprasad Chaurasia
1982	When Time Stood Still!	with Zakir Hussain (Live in Bombay)
1987	Rag Madhuvanti & Rag Misra Tilang	with Zakir Hussain
1988	Hypnotic Santoor	
1991	Maestro's Choice, Series One	
1991	A Sublime Trance	
1991	The Glory of Strings	
1991	Raga Purya Kalyan	with Zakir Hussain
1993	Rag Rageshri	with Zakir Hussain
1993	Raga Bhopali vol I	
1993	Raga Kedari vol II	
1993	Varshā – A Homage to the Rain Gods	
1994	Sound Scapes, Music of the Mountains	
1994	Hundred Strings of Santoor	
1994	The Pioneer of Santoor	
1994	Raag Bilaskhani Todi	
1994	A Morning Raga Gurjari Todi	
1994	Feelings	
1996	The Valley Recalls - In Search of Peace, Love & Harmony	with Hariprasad Chaurasia
1996	The Valley Recalls - Raga Bhoopali	with Hariprasad Chaurasia
1996	Yugal Bandi	with Hariprasad Chaurasia
1999	Maestro's Choice, Series Two	
1999	Sampradaya	
1999	Rasdhara	with Hariprasad Chaurasia
2001	Saturday Night in Bombay – Remember Shakti (Universal Records), Composed Shringar	with John McLaughlin, Zakir Hussain and many others musicians
2002	Ananda Bliss	with Zakir Hussain
2002	The Flow of Time	with Zakir Hussain
2002	Sangeet Sartaj	
2003	Vibrant Music for Reiki	
2004	Sympatico (Charukeshi – Santoor)	
2004	The Inner Path (Kirvani – Santoor	
2007	Essential Evening Chants	with Hariprasad Chaurasia

=== Contributing artist ===
Year	Title	Network
1996	The Rough Guide to the Music of India and Pakistan	World Music Network

== Awards ==
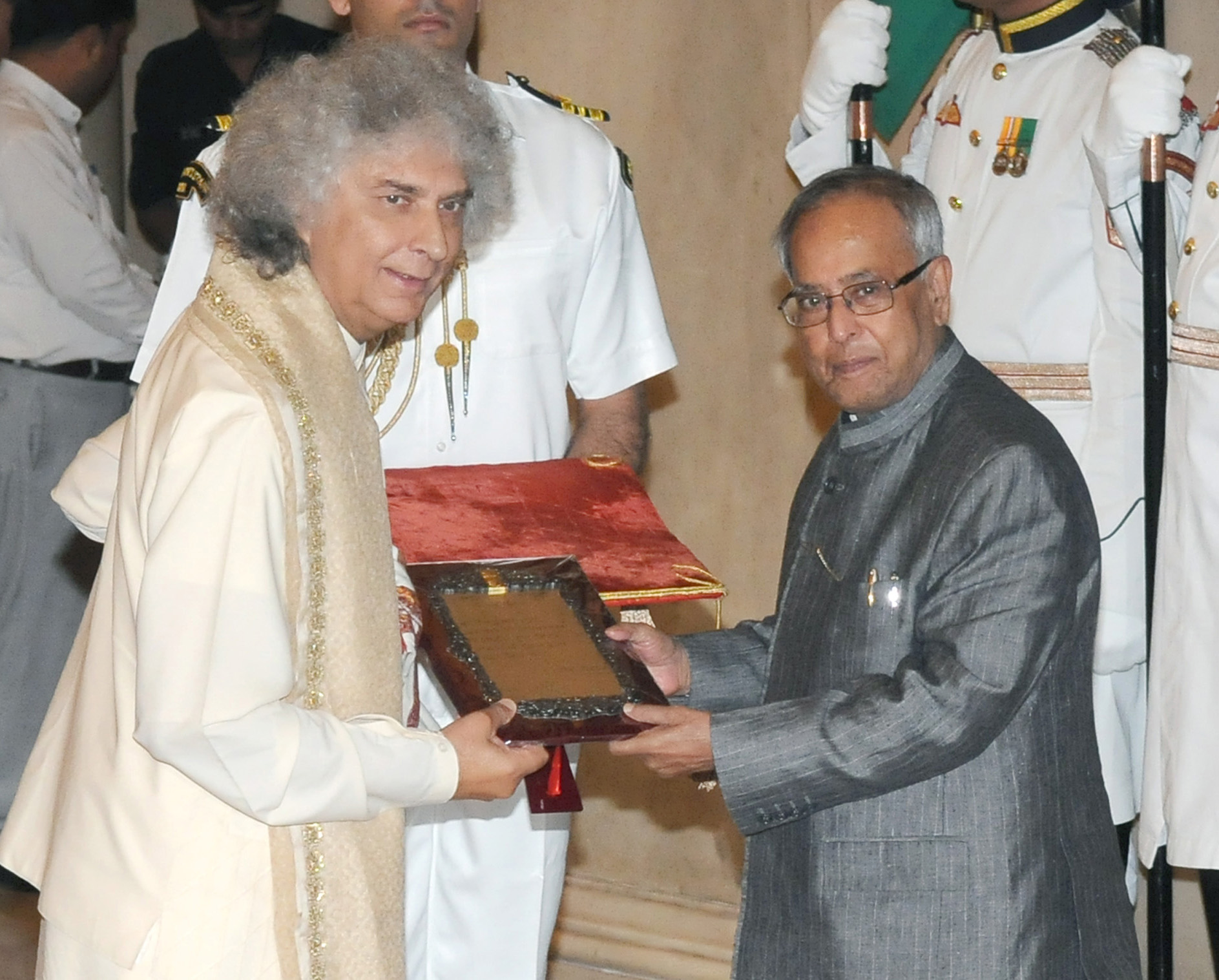
President Pranab Mukherjee presenting the Sangeet Natak Akademi Fellowship to Sharma in 2011

Sharma was the recipient of national and international awards, including an honorary citizenship of the city of Baltimore, USA, in 1985, the Sangeet Natak Akademi Award in 1986, the Padma Shri in 1991, and the Padma Vibhushan in 2001.

Some of his other awards included:

- Platinum Disc for Call of the Valley
- Platinum Disc for music of film Silsila
- Gold Disc for music of film Faasle
- Platinum Disc for music of film Chandni
- Pandit Chatur Lal Excellence Award – 2015
