= Jolly Mukherjee =

Indian singer (born 1956)

- Born: 1 October 1956 (age 69); Mumbai, Maharashtra, India
- Other name: King of Strings
- Occupation: Singer
- Years active: 1979-present
- Musical career
- Genres: Blues; Filmi
- Instrument: Vocals

Jolly Mukherjee (born on 1 October 1956) is an Indian singer who specializes in the music of Bollywood. He started his career as a backing singer for commercials, then moving on to writing music for airline on-flight introductions, where he sometimes wrote for British Airways. His roots include a mixture of Hindustani classical music and Western music. With the Madras Cinematic Orchestra, he recorded the album Fusebox, which included remixes from State of Bengal and Badmarsh & Shri. He provided the string arrangements for Icelandic singer Björk's song "Verandi".

== Discography ==
Denotes films that have not yet been released

Year	Film/Album	Song(s)	Composer(s)	Co-singer(s)	Notes
1988	Dayavan	"Diwani Tum Jawanon Ki"	Laxmikant Pyarelal	Sapna Mukherjee, Mohammad Aziz	
1988	Dayavan	Chahe Meri Jaan Tu Le Le	Laxmikant Pyarelal	Sapna Mukherjee	
1989	Chandni	"Chandni O Meri Chandni"	Shiv-Hari	Sridevi	
1991	Saathi	"Aaj Hum Tum O Sanam"	Nadeem–Shravan	Anuradha Paudwal	
1991	Saajan	"Aei to Prothom Dekhlam"	Nadeem-Shravan		Bengali
1992	Sangeet	"Sun O Hasina"	Anand Milind		
1992	Raju Ban Gaya Gentleman	""Kya Hua" (Laveria Hua)"	Jatin–Lalit	Kumar Sanu, Alka Yagnik	
1992	Raju Ban Gaya Gentleman	Raju Ban Gaya Gentleman	Jatin–Lalit	Kumar Sanu, Sudesh Bhonsle, Sadhana Sargam	
1993	Sahibaan	"Sahibaan Meri Sahibaan"	Shiv-Hari	Anuradha Paudwal	
1993	Sahibaan	Is Mele Mein Log Aate Hain	Shiv-Hari	Anuradha Paudwal	
1993	Aaina	"Goriya Re Goriya"	Dilip Sen-Sameer Sen	Lata Mangeshkar	
1993	Shatranj	"Koi Nahin"	Anand–Milind	Kumar Sanu	
1994	Aatish: Feel the Fire	"Dil Dil Dil Main Tere Pyar Mein"	Nadeem-Shravan	Alka Yagnik	
1994	Aatish: Feel the Fire	Ya Mustafa" but change to Ya dilruba	Nadeem-Shravan	Mukul Aggarwal, Alka Yagnik	
1995	Sabse Bada Khiladi	"Mukaala Mukaabla"	Rajesh Roshan	Kumar Sanu, Alka Yagnik	
1995	Raghuveer	"O Jaaneman Chehra"	Dilip Sen-Sameer Sen	Alka Yagnik	
1995	Bewafa Sanam	"Nargisi Nargisi Aankhein Teri Nargisi"	Raju Singh-Sameer Sen	Lata Mangeshkar	
1996	Ek Tha Raja	"Topi Topi"	Anand–Milind	Abhijeet Bhattacharya, Poornima	
1997	Judge Mujrim	"Laila o Laila"	Anand Milind		
2000	Josh	"Zinda Hain Hum To"	Anu Malik	Abhijeet Bhattacharya, Hema Sardesai	
2000	Kodom Ali Mastan	"Ki Batti Lagaili (Ore O Mainka)"			Bangladeshi Film
2002	Raaz	"Yahan Pe Sab Shanti Shanti Hai"	Nadeem-Shravan	Bali Brahmbhatt, Suzanne D'Mello	
2013	Satya 2	"Taaqat"	Sanjeev–Darshan	Hricha Narayan, Arghya, Sanjeev Rathod	
