= Shiv–Hari =

Indian musical duo

Shiv-Hari
- Origin: India
- Years active: 1967–2022
- Members: Shivkumar Sharma; Hariprasad Chaurasia

Shiv-Hari refers to the Indian music director duo of Shivkumar Sharma, a Santoor player, and Hariprasad Chaurasia, a flutist. The duo has worked on Indian classical music pieces as well as Indian movie scores. They worked mainly for Yash Chopra.

== Career ==
As early as 1967, Shiv-Hari went on to record the album titled Call of the Valley. With the active participation of guitarist Brij Bhushan Kabra and the unusual way in which this Indian classical music album was organized, the result was a fresh, edgy, and slightly controversial form of music. The innovative use of the guitar on the album made it popular among people from Western countries. It is still one of the most successful albums of Indian classical music ever recorded.

This marked the beginning of the partnership and numerous live outings followed over the years. As a nod to the 1967 concept album, the duo released a live album The Valley Recalls in 1996.

On 10 May 2022, Shivkumar Sharma died due to cardiac arrest. He was 84 years old.

== Discography ==
Although they mostly embarked on solo projects at different points of their respective careers, Shiv-Hari teamed up again for eight Hindi-language movies in total.

- Silsila (1981)
- Faasle (1985)
- Vijay (1988)
- Chandni (1989)
- Lamhe (1991)
- Parampara (1993)
- Sahibaan (1993)
- Darr (1993)

== Nominations ==
Filmfare Award for Best Music Director:

- Silsila (1981)
- Chandni (1989)
- Lamhe (1991)
- Darr (1993)

== Recent activities ==
Shiv-Hari have performed many live programs together. They toured multiple locations such as London and Singapore in 2011. Santoor maestro Pandit Shivkumar Sharma died on May 10 at the age of 84.
