= Making Music (Zakir Hussain album) =

Studio album by Zakir Hussain
- Released: 1987
- Recorded: December 1986
- Studio: Rainbow Studio; Oslo, Norway
- Genre: Jazz; world jazz; Indo jazz
- Length: 49:14
- Label: ECM 1349
- Producer: Manfred Eicher

Zakir Hussain chronology
Song for Everyone (1985)	Making Music (1987)	Tabla Duet (1988)

Making Music is an album by Indian tabla player and composer Zakir Hussain recorded in 1986 and released on ECM the following year. The quartet features flautist Hariprasad Chaurasia, guitarist John McLaughlin and saxophonist Jan Garbarek.

== Reception ==
The AllMusic review by Michael G. Nastos awarded the album 2½ stars stating "World fusion/jazz group falls short of its great potential."

Professional ratings
Review scores
Source	Rating
Allmusic	2.5/5 stars

== Track listing ==
All compositions by Zakir Hussain except as indicated

1. "Making Music" - 12:31
2. "Zakir" (John McLaughlin) - 6:23
3. "Water Girl" - 3:52
4. "Toni" - 3:51
5. "Anisa" - 9:14
6. "Sunjog" - 7:36
7. "You and Me" (Hussain, McLaughlin) - 2:12
8. "Sabah" - 3:35

== Personnel ==
- Zakir Hussain – tabla, percussion, voice
- Hariprasad Chaurasia – flutes
- John McLaughlin – acoustic guitar
- Jan Garbarek – tenor saxophone, soprano saxophone
