= The Rough Guide to the Music of India and Pakistan =

Compilation album by Various artists
- Released: 1996
- Genre: World
- Length: 77:13
- Label: World Music Network

Full series chronology
The Rough Guide to the Music of Kenya and Tanzania (1996)	The Rough Guide to the Music of India and Pakistan (1996)	The Rough Guide to the Music of the Andes (1996)

The Rough Guide to the Music of India and Pakistan is a world music compilation album originally released in 1996. Part of the World Music Network Rough Guides series, it focuses on the music of India and Pakistan, ranging from Hindi film songs to Hindustani classical music to Qawwali to folk. The release was compiled by Phil Stanton, co-founder of the World Music Network. Artwork was designed by Impetus and Anthony Cassidy.

Adam Greenberg of AllMusic gave the album three stars, recommending it to new listeners, while criticizing the truncating of the classical pieces. Michaelangelo Matos, writing for the Chicago Reader, described the release as "consistent" but "repetitious".

== Track listing ==
No.	Title	Artist	Length
1.	"Guru Bandana (Prayer)"	Ali Akbar Khan With Asha Bhosle	5:34
2.	"Agun Pani"	Purna Chandra Das Baul	4:37
3.	"Tanam Farsuda Jan"	Sabri Brothers led by Ghulam Farid Sabri	13:02
4.	"Mohé Apné Rang Main Rang Lé Nijaam"	Nusrat Fateh Ali Khan	10:02
5.	"Kaman Song"	Musicians & Poets Of Râjasthân	5:24
6.	"Gula Sta de Kilie"	Zarsanga	4:19
7.	"Thumri in Raga Khamaj"	Bismillah Khan	8:35
8.	"Extract from Raga Hameer"	Vilayat Khan	5:47
9.	"Extract from Raga Bhairav"	Amjad Ali Khan	5:31
10.	"Peace (Alap)"	Shivkumar Sharma & Hariprasad Chaurasia	8:00
11.	"Ninnade"	Dr. N. Ramani	6:22

Professional ratings
Review scores
Source	Rating
Allmusic	3/5 stars
