= The House That Ananda Built =

1968 film

- Directed by: Fali Bilimoria
- Produced by: Fali Bilimoria
- Distributed by: Films Division of India
- Release date: 1968
- Country: India
- Language: English

The House That Ananda Built is a 1968 Indian short documentary film directed by Fali Bilimoria. It was nominated for an Academy Award for Best Documentary Short.
