= Rang Barse Bhige Chunar Wali =

1981 song

Song by Amitabh Bachchan

from the album Silsila
- Language: Hindi
- Released: 1981
- Genre: Folk
- Length: 6:26
- Label: Saregama
- Songwriter: Harivansh Rai Bachchan
- Composer: Shiv–Hari

Music video
- Rang Barse Bhige Chunar Wali on YouTube

"Rang Barse Bhige Chunar Wali" (Devanagri: रंग बरसे भीगे चूनर वाली) is a song from the 1981 Hindi film Silsila. The song "Rang Barse Bhige Chunarwali" which Amitabh Bachchan sings during the film is said to be one of India's best known folk songs. The music director was Shiv-Hari, both also noted classical musicians. The taal (rhythm) of the song is Keherwa (Kaharva) of Hindustani classical music, while the lyrics were by poet Harivansh Rai Bachchan, based on a traditional bhajan, by 15th-century mystic poet Meera.

The song was featured in a film sequence showing a community Holi celebration with film's cast, including Bachchan, Jaya Bachchan and Rekha and hence got link with Holi festivities.

== In popular culture ==
To date, even decades after its release, 'Rang Barse' remains one of the most popular songs played on the occasion of festival Holi in north India.

== See also ==
- Meera
- Shiv-Hari
