= Chandni (1989 film) =

1989 Bollywood film

- Theatrical release poster
- Directed by: Yash Chopra
- Screenplay by: Arun Kaul; Umesh Kalbagh
- Dialogues by: Sagar Sarhadi
- Story by: Kamna Chandra
- Produced by: Yash Chopra
- Starring: Sridevi; Rishi Kapoor; Vinod Khanna; Waheeda Rehman
- Cinematography: Manmohan Singh
- Edited by: Keshav Naidu
- Music by: Shiv-Hari
- Production company: Yash Raj Films
- Release date: 15 September 1989
- Running time: 179 minutes
- Country: India
- Language: Hindi
- Budget: Rs 8 Crore
- Box office: Rs 27.2 Crore

Chandni (Moonlight) is a 1989 Indian Hindi-language musical romance film directed and co-produced by Yash Chopra from a story written by Kamna Chandra with a screenplay by Umesh Kalbagh, Arun Kaul, and Sagar Sarhadi. The film stars Sridevi in the title role of Chandni Mathur, a young, effervescent woman torn between two suitors played by Rishi Kapoor and Vinod Khanna. Waheeda Rehman, Anupam Kher, Sushma Seth, Mita Vashisht, Manohar Singh feature in supporting roles.

The eighties marked a professional setback in Chopra's career, After a series of failed action films, Chopra decided to return to his roots and make a romantic musical, a film with all the hallmarks of what has come to be known as the "Yash Chopra style" – heroine-oriented, romantic, emotional, depicting the lifestyle of the super-elite, with melodic music used in songs picturized in foreign locations. The film marked the first collaboration between Chopra and Sridevi; they would collaborate again for the path-breaking Lamhe (1991).

Chandni was theatrically released on 15 September 1989 by Yash Raj Films. The film emerged as a widespread critical and commercial success, ranking as the third highest-grossing Hindi film of the year, with its soundtrack emerging as the best-selling album of the year as well as the decade, with more than 10 million copies sold. The massive success of the film and its soundtrack was instrumental in ending the era of violent action films in Indian Cinema and rejuvenating the romantic musical genre. The success of the film further reinforced Sridevi's position as the top female star of the era. Over the years, Chandni has been hailed as one of Chopra's finest films.

At the 37th National Film Awards, Chandni won Best Popular Film Providing Wholesome Entertainment. At the 35th Filmfare Awards, the film received 10 nominations, including Best Film, Best Director (Yash Chopra), Best Actress (Sridevi), Best Actor (Rishi Kapoor), Best Supporting Actor (Vinod Khanna) and Best Supporting Actress (Waheeda Rehman), and won Best Cinematography.

== Plot ==
Chandni Mathur, a middle-class naïve girl, travels to Delhi with her parents to attend her cousin's wedding. There she meets Rohit Gupta, her cousin's friend. Rohit instantly falls in love with the beautiful Chandni and starts courting her. After his continuous attempts, Chandni accepts him, and they eventually get engaged, though Gupta's family dislikes Chandni due to a difference in their social status. One day, Rohit calls Chandni and asks her to come to the roof of her home, where he is waiting for her in a helicopter to shower rose petals on her. While doing that, his helicopter crashes, paralyzing his right side. The Guptas blame Chandni for the mishap and mistreat her. Thinking he cannot be a good husband, Rohit lets Chandni go. Heartbroken, she leaves Delhi and travels to Mumbai and finds work at a travel agency. Lalit Khanna, the head of the travel agency, and a widower, falls for Chandni and asks her to marry him, and she accepts the proposal hesitantly.

Two years later, after much contemplation, Chandni agrees to marry Lalit and meets his mom, Lata, who likes her instantly. Lalit visits on a business trip and runs into Rohit, who is still undergoing treatment from professional therapists and physicians for his paralysis.

Having recovered, he befriends Lalit, and they share their respective love stories, unaware that they both love the same girl, Chandni. Back in India, Rohit visits Lalit's house to meet him. Chandni opens the door; she and Rohit are surprised to see each other. Rohit reveals that he is no longer paralyzed. They get keyed up with tears, and he seizes this chance to propose to her.

However, Chandni tells Rohit that she is engaged to marry Lalit. She also reminds him of what the Guptas did to her. He leaves regretfully. Lalit invites Rohit to his wedding as they have become friends. Rohit and Chandni pretend to be strangers. On the wedding day, he mumbles and stumbles down a flight of stairs in a drunken stupor. Out of panic, Chandni runs towards him, hugs him, and starts crying. Upon seeing this, Lalit realizes Chandni loves Rohit. In the hospital, Rohit regains consciousness. Lalit sacrifices his love for Chandni, and she marries Rohit. Lalit and Lata share a brief, sad moment upon seeing Chandni and Rohit leave.

== Cast ==
- Sridevi as Chandni Mathur
- Rishi Kapoor as Rohit Gupta
- Vinod Khanna as Lalit Khanna
- Waheeda Rehman as Lata Khanna, Lalit's mother
- Sushma Seth as Armani Gupta, Rohit's mother
- Mita Vashisht as Kiran Chawla
- Anant Mahadevan as Brijbhan Chawla
- Achala Sachdev
- Beena Banerjee
- Manohar Singh as Nihaal Gupta, Rohit's father
- Ram Gopal Bajaj as Shiv Prasad Mathur, Chandni's father
- Asha Sharma as Asha Mathur, Chandni's mother
- Lalit Tiwari
- Suhas Joshi
- Renu Arya
- Bharat Bhushan Bhalla as Dr. Aryamaan Das
- Anupam Kher as Ramesh Mehra
- Juhi Chawla as Devika Shastri, Lalit's first lover (special appearance)
- Gajendra singh pal
- Bijendra singh

== Production ==
Speaking about the film with Karan Johar, Yash Chopra recalled when he was making Vijay (1988), an action film, he felt like he was not supposed to make films like this. Later, he met with writer Kamna Chandra, who had achieved popularity after having written Raj Kapoor's Prem Rog (1982). She presented the story of a social romantic musical film to Chopra, who liked it and started casting the stars. However, at the launch party, Chopra had a change of heart and decided to change the second half of the script, wherein originally Chandni was supposed to marry Lalit and have a son. The idea of a paralyzed lead was suggested by Rishi Kapoor, who had seen the 1981 Hollywood movie Whose Life Is It Anyway? and was inspired by the character played by Richard Dreyfuss.

Initially, Rekha was approached to play the titular role; however, upon her refusal, Chopra offered the role to Sridevi who accepted the offer.

With the casting of Vinod Khanna, distributors started demanding an action sequence in the film, to which Chopra refused. Originally, the script required Khanna to save Sridevi from a fire incident. However, upon watching the completed film, Chopra felt that it did not feel like a part of the film, so he called Sridevi and Khanna back for a day's shoot to re-film their first meeting sequence.

== Music ==
The soundtrack of Chandni was composed by Shiv Kumar Sharma and Hariprasad Chaurasia, known together as Shiv–Hari. The lyrics were provided by Anand Bakshi. In addition to the songs listed below, there was a recurring instrumental love melody, not part of a full song. That melody was further developed into the song "Kabhi Main Kahoon" for Chopra's next film Lamhe (1991), also scored by Shiv-Hari.

The film's soundtrack was a major success in India and sold more than 10 million copies, becoming the best-selling soundtrack album of the year as well as the decade. It is believed that the soundtrack helped bring back the romantic musical genre, along with Qayamat Se Qayamat Tak (1988) and Maine Pyar Kiya (1989), with its songs and lyrics receiving major critical acclaim. According to Yash Raj Films, the soundtrack went 4× Platinum by the day of the premiere.

The song Chandni O Meri Chandni was remixed and reused in the 2012 film Chaar Din Ki Chandni.

The songs "Mere Haathon Mein" and "Chandni O Meri Chandni" were respectively at #3 and #12 on the year-end Binaca Geetmala list of 1989.The song "Lagi Aaj Sawan Ki" was at #10 on the year-end list of 1990.

No.	Title	Singer(s)	Length
1.	"Mere Haathon Mein"	Lata Mangeshkar	05:34
2.	"Mehbooba"	Lata Mangeshkar, Vinod Rathod	04:53
3.	"Main Sasural Nahi Jaaungi"	Pamela Chopra	04:06
4.	"Mitwa (Tere Mere Honton Pe)" (Raga Pahadi)	Lata Mangeshkar, Babla Mehta	04:31
5.	"Aa Meri Jaan"	Lata Mangeshkar	04:21
6.	"Dance Music"	Instrumental	03:16
7.	"Chandni O Meri Chandni"	Sridevi, Jolly Mukherjee	04:32
8.	"Lagi Aaj Sawan Ki" (Raga Bhairavi, with Gunakri)	Suresh Wadkar, Anupama Deshpande	03:25
9.	"Parbat Se Kaali"	Asha Bhosle, Vinod Rathod	04:22
10.	"Tu Mujhe Suna"	Nitin Mukesh, Suresh Wadkar	04:30
11.	"Mere Haathon Mein"	Instrumental	05:47
Total length:			49:17

== Box Office ==
Chandni was made on a budget of 8 Crores and grossed 27 Crores worldwide at the Box Office Collection.

== Legacy ==
Chandni received widespread critical acclaim upon its release, with many critics highlighting the film's impact in being instrumental in bringing an end to an era of violent action movies in Indian cinema and rejuvenating the romantic musical genre. The film emerged as a blockbuster and the third highest-grossing Hindi film of the year. The Hindu stated that "the film opened to full houses and distributors had to drastically increase the number of theatres". It was cited by Times of India as "one of the most-watched films of Indian Cinema." Hindustan Times featured the movie in its list of 'Yash Chopra's Greatest Hits' saying "it was instrumental in ending the era of violence in Bollywood and bringing back the romance into Hindi films."

Chandni consolidated Sridevi's position as the top female star of the era. Describing Sridevi's performance in the film, Indiatimes wrote "True to her screen-name, she was an epitome of radiance, warmth and vivacity. She effortlessly introduced us to the powerful streaks, her classic, angelic character was laden with." The scene where she confronts Rishi Kapoor was ranked by Rediff as one of the "10 Best Scenes from Yash Chopra Films." While Sridevi topped the Hindustan Times' list of Yash Chopra's "Top 5 Heroines", CNN-IBN ranked her #1 on its list of 'Yash Chopra's 10 Most Sensuous Heroines', saying that "Yash Chopra immortalized Sridevi as the perfect Chandni." The titular character became one of the most famous characters of Hindi cinema, with India Today including it in its list of 'Yash Chopra's Iconic Characters'. CNN-IBN listed it among 'The Cult Characters Yash Chopra Created', while NDTV featured it in its list of 'Yash Chopra's Greatest Creations' stating that the film established Sridevi "as the nation's sweetheart" and "reinforced her position as the reigning actress in Bollywood."

Costume design in the film was done by Bhanu Athaiya and Leena Daru. Sridevi's iconic 'Chandni Look' revolutionized fashion in North India and became synonymous with the actress, with Rediff stating "A luminous Sridevi slips into every possible design in white for a major chunk of the romance and no one complains." Speaking about the look, Chopra told film critic Rajeev Masand "While making Chandni, I had a vision of who I wanted this girl to be. I told Sridevi that most of her costumes in the film would be in white." The Tribune wrote "Leena Daru scored a winner again when she created the Chandni look for Sridevi. Every street corner sold the salwar-kameez and dupatta that gave the heroine a refreshingly understated look, rarely seen on the Indian screen", while Mid-Day reported "Leena Daru dressed Bollywood's beauties for several years. But it was her simple white churidar and kurta with the leheriya dupatta for Sridevi in Chandni that gave the Southern belle an angelic image and caused the Chandni Chowk stores to hit the jackpot with thousands of copies." BizAsia described the effect of the look saying "Chopra never quite got over his Sridevi hangover and almost always chose to present his future lead heroines in similar outfits (Juhi Chawla in Darr (1993), Madhuri Dixit in Dil To Pagal Hai (1997), Preity Zinta in Veer-Zaara (2004)), but none of them became half as iconic as Sridevi did after Chandni." The 'Chandni Look' was also highlighted in the film's famous tandav dance sequence by Sridevi, where Rediff said "the actress transformed into a mythical goddess in a white number." Sridevi's chiffon sarees became equally popular with Indian Express writing "This film made the chiffon sari a must-have in every Indian woman's wardrobe."

The music of Chandni became a multi-platinum success, with Sridevi's famous dance number "Mere Haathon Mein Nau Nau Choodiyan Hai" finding a place in Rediff's chart of 'Bollywood's Top 25 Wedding Songs'. Sridevi also lent her voice to the film's popular title-track "Chandni O Meri Chandni" which featured among the 'Top 5 Songs of Yash Chopra' by Hindustan Times. Talking about her role in Chandni, Sridevi said it was "a lively and vibrant girl in the first half (who) becomes quiet and goes into a shell in the second half. I loved that transformation and when you have a director like Yash Chopra at the helm, you can be sure that he will make the best out of everything."

== Awards and nominations ==
37th National Film Awards:

- Best Popular Film Providing Wholesome Entertainment – Yash Chopra & T. Subbarami Reddy

35th Filmfare Awards:
Wins

- Best Cinematography – Manmohan Singh

Nominations

- Best Film – Yash Chopra & T. Subbarami Reddy
- Best Director – Yash Chopra
- Best Actress – Sridevi
- Best Actor – Rishi Kapoor
- Best Supporting Actor – Vinod Khanna
- Best Supporting Actress – Waheeda Rehman
- Best Music Director – Shiv-Hari
- Best Lyricist – Anand Bakshi for "Lagi Aaj Sawan Ki"
- Best Male Playback Singer – Suresh Wadkar for "Lagi Aaj Sawan Ki"
