= Bansuri Guru =

- Bansuri Guru film poster
- Directed by: Rajeev Chaurasia
- Written by: Rajeev Chaurasia & Pushpanjali Chaurasia
- Based on: Life of Hariprasad Chaurasia
- Produced by: Films Division, Ministry of Information & Broadcasting, Govt. of India
- Cinematography: Anil Kumar
- Edited by: Karl Mascarenhas
- Music by: Hariprasad Chaurasia
- Production companies: Universal Studios and Prime Focus
- Release date: 13 January 2013 (Pune International Film Festival)
- Running time: 60 minutes
- Country: India
- Language: Hindi

Bansuri Guru is a 2013 Indian documentary film about the life of classical instrumentalist Hariprasad Chaurasia. Directed by Rajeev Chaurasia as his directorial debut, the film is introduced by Amitabh Bachchan.

== Production ==
Bansuri Guru was produced by the Government of India's Films Division and features a series of interviews conducted with Chaurasia and others about the artist, including shots in Mumbai, Bhubaneswar and Rotterdam.
