= Darr =

1993 Indian film by Yash Chopra

Darr: A Violent Love Story
- Theatrical release poster
- Directed by: Yash Chopra
- Screenplay by: Honey Irani
- Dialogues by: Javed Siddiqui
- Story by: Honey Irani
- Produced by: Yash Chopra
- Starring: Sunny Deol; Juhi Chawla; Shah Rukh Khan
- Cinematography: Manmohan Singh
- Edited by: Keshav Naidu
- Music by: Shiv–Hari
- Production company: Yash Raj Films
- Distributed by: Yash Raj Films
- Release date: 24 December 1993
- Running time: 177 minutes
- Country: India
- Language: Hindi
- Budget: ₹3.25 crore
- Box office: est. ₹21.3 crore

Darr: A Violent Love Story (Hindi pronunciation: [ɖər]; lit. Fear) is a 1993 Indian Hindi-language psychological thriller film directed and produced by Yash Chopra under his banner Yash Raj Films. It stars Sunny Deol, Juhi Chawla, and Shah Rukh Khan, along with Anupam Kher, Tanvi Azmi, Annu Kapoor, and Dalip Tahil in supporting roles.

Darr released on 24 December 1993, coinciding with the Christmas weekend, and emerged as a major commercial success. It was declared a blockbuster at the box-office and went on to become the third highest-grossing Hindi film of the year and the highest-grossing Indian film of the year. It received widespread critical acclaim upon release, with praise towards the direction, story, screenplay, soundtrack, cinematography, costumes and the performances of the cast.

Darr proved to be a milestone for Chawla and Khan's careers, catapulting them to stardom. The film emerged as Chawla's third consecutive commercial success that year, following Lootere and Hum Hain Rahi Pyaar Ke, thus solidifying her career as a leading lady in the 1990s, while Khan's portrayal of an obsessive lover was widely appreciated by critics and audiences alike, making it one of the greatest Bollywood Villains. The film marked the first of Khan's collaborations with Chopra and the Yash Raj Films banner.

The film received two nominations at the 39th Filmfare Awards for Best Director (Chopra) and Best Villain (Khan), and won two awards: Best Comedian (Kher) and Best Cinematography (Manmohan Singh). At the 41st National Film Awards, the film won the award for Best Popular Film Providing Wholesome Entertainment. The famous Malayalam Director Shaji Kailas planned to remake in Malayalam with Kunchacko Boban on 2000 with Khan's role with the name as "Nna Thaan Case Kodu", but it wasn't materialized. Later a movie released in the same name on 2022.

== Plot ==
Kiran Awasthi, a beautiful college student, visits her brother Vijay and his wife Poonam upon her return home. Kiran is in love with Lieutenant Sunil Malhotra, a Marine Commando in the Indian Navy. However, Kiran is relentlessly stalked by her former classmate Rahul Mehra, who is in unrequited love with her. Rahul is the son of Sunil’s Commanding Officer Captain Avinash Mehra.

Rahul makes an effort to be friendly with Sunil in order to be near Kiran. Rahul keeps calling her when she gets home and asks her to avoid Sunil, but despite her fear, she rejects Rahul's authority over her. She and her family are frightened when he visits her on both her birthday and Holi. Kiran and Sunil become engaged thanks to Vijay and Poonam, who think the stalker would never bother Kiran again.

Upon learning this, a furious Rahul attempts to murder Sunil but is unsuccessful. When Sunil is chasing Rahul, he doesn't know that the stalker is Rahul, he has an accident and is taken to the hospital. Kiran chooses to flee the city so that the stalker won't harm her beloved any longer but is apprehended by Sunil, who marries her that very night. Rahul is attacked by this and vows to take Kiran for himself. He kills the police officers sent to protect the couple and vandalizes their new home with graffiti reading "Shaadi mubarak Kiran" (Congrats on your marriage, Kiran) and "Tum meri ho kiran" (You are mine, Kiran).

This horrifies Kiran, who worries that she might lose her mind. Sunil decides to take Kiran on a surprise honeymoon to Switzerland while booking extra tickets to Goa, so that the stalker goes away by misunderstanding that the couple is in Goa. Rahul falls for the trick and looks everywhere for Kiran in Goa in vain, but couldn't find her. Instead, he meets Vikram "Vicky" Oberoi, a friend from college, who is ill. Rahul then makes an effort to get to know Kiran's brother and sister-in-law by paying them daily visits to learn about Kiran's location.

Vicky calls Rahul and invites him to meet him. When he does, he discovers him on his deathbed, pleading with Rahul to kill him since he can no longer bear the anguish. After a brief pause, he kills his companion while creating the illusion that Vicky was the stalker. Kiran's family believes the stalker killed himself after failing to find Kiran and relax. Rahul is informed of her true whereabouts, and he shows up at her hotel.

He is acknowledged by Kiran and Sunil, who invite him to join their celebrations. However, Sunil learns that Rahul was Kiran's stalker when Vijay calls him and says that Rahul had been visiting him and Poonam but not mentioned he was going to Switzerland. Sunil sends Kiran to wait for him at a boat, before luring Rahul to the forest and attacking him. Rahul begs for mercy, stabs Sunil and then abandons him to perish. Later, as Rahul arrives at the boat, he tries to marry Kiran without her will and informs her that Sunil has died. Despite her pleading and begging, he hands her his mother's old saree and orders her to wear it.

Kiran locks herself in a room in the boat. When the boat's door is smashed and Kiran is yanked back out by Rahul and pretends to agree to marry Rahul, then it is discovered that Sunil didn't actually die and he returns to save Kiran bloodied. Enraged, Sunil brutally fights Rahul and ends up shooting him thrice. Dying, Rahul expresses shame for his actions and begs Kiran to not hate him. Kiran and Sunil return to India and visit their relatives once again.

== Cast ==
- Sunny Deol as Lieutenant Sunil Malhotra, Kiran’s boyfriend and later husband
- Juhi Chawla as Kiran Malhotra, Sunil’s girlfriend and later wife
- Shah Rukh Khan as Rahul Mehra, Kiran's obsessive unrequited lover and stalker-The Main Antagonist
- Anupam Kher as Vijay Awasthi, Kiran's brother
- Tanvi Azmi as Poonam Awasthi, Vijay’s wife; Kiran’s sister-in-law
- Dalip Tahil as Captain Avinash Mehra, Rahul's father; Sunil's superior in the Indian Navy
- Annu Kapoor as Vikram "Vicky" Oberoi, Rahul's friend
- Piloo J. Wadia as the hotel manager
- Vikas Anand as the psychiatrist

== Production ==
=== Development ===
Aditya Chopra wanted to make a film similar to the Hollywood film Cape Fear (1991) starring Robert De Niro. The film was to be directed by Naresh Malhotra, an assistant of Yash Chopra, with Raveena Tandon, Deepak Malhotra, and Saahil Chaddha in the lead roles. However, Yash decided to take over the project, and eventually changed the casting. The film's title Darr was suggested to Chopra by his other son Uday Chopra (who worked as an assistant director in the film) and Hrithik Roshan.

=== Casting ===
Sridevi, who had previously collaborated with Chopra in Chandni (1989) and Lamhe (1991), was first offered the role of Kiran. The role was planned much like her previous roles in Chandni and Lamhe. However, she wanted Kiran to be the obsessed lover instead of the victim; Chopra refused this change of plot, causing Sridevi to opt out. Madhuri Dixit was offered the role next, but she refused due to scheduling conflicts. Aishwarya Rai was screen tested for the role, but ultimately could do not the film as she was competing for the Miss World Pageant at the time. Divya Bharti was then signed, however, she was replaced with Juhi Chawla at Aamir Khan's request.

Sanjay Dutt was the original choice for the antagonist Rahul Mehra, however was unable to sign the film due to his conviction of illegal possession of arms. Sudesh Berry was considered for the role, but was rejected after a screen test. The role was then offered to Ajay Devgn, who declined as he was uncomfortable playing a negative character at that stage of his career. Aamir Khan, who had worked with Chopra in Parampara the same year, was signed. However, he was removed from the project after he asked for a joint narration with Sunny Deol. Khan's reasoning for this was that since he and Deol were two leading actors, they could hear their roles and if they were both satisfied, no ego hassles would happen henceforth. Furthermore, Khan was also unhappy with the way Deol's character beat Rahul up in the climax. Following Aamir's exit, Shah Rukh Khan was cast as Rahul after Chopra's son Aditya had watched his debut performance in Deewana and suggested his name. Darr ended up catapulting Khan to stardom and he went to star in all of Yash's future directorial ventures.

Rishi Kapoor, Mithun Chakraborty, and Jackie Shroff were all offered the role of Sunil, however all three of them refused. Nitish Bharadwaj was also approached for the role of Sunil, due to his popularity as Lord Krishna in B. R. Chopra's Mahabharat, but declined as he felt the role was not challenging enough. Sunny Deol had been given the choice of playing Sunil or the antagonist Rahul. Deol chose to play Sunil, believing that a negative role would harm his career.

== Soundtrack ==
The soundtrack was composed by the duo Shiv–Hari, with the lyrics written by Anand Bakshi.

It was the second best-selling Bollywood soundtrack album of the year, being surpassed only by Dilwale. The soundtrack album sold about 4.5 million units in India, earning at least ₹10.8 crore (equivalent to ₹85 crore or US$9.1 million in 2026). Rakesh Budhu of Planet Bollywood in his review gave the album 8.5 stars out of 10.

Darr's soundtrack marked one of the earliest instances of Udit Narayan supplying his voice for Shah Rukh Khan. Narayan's voice went on to be featured in the soundtracks of every single one of Khan's collaborations with Yash Raj Films until Veer-Zaara (2004).

Darr

Soundtrack album by Shiv-Hari
- Released: 1993
- Genre: Film soundtrack
- Length: 42:12
- Label: Saregama
- Producer: Shiv-Hari

Shiv-Hari chronology
Sahibaan (1993)	Darr (1993)

Professional ratings
Review scores
Source	Rating
Planet Bollywood	8.5/10 stars

All lyrics are written by Anand Bakshi.

No.	Title	Singer(s)	Length
1.	"Jaadu Teri Nazar"	Udit Narayan	4:41
2.	"Darwaaza Band Karlo"	Lata Mangeshkar & Abhijeet	6:05
3.	"Ang Se Ang Lagana"	Vinod Rathod, Sudesh Bhosle, Alka Yagnik & Devaki Pandit	6:49
4.	"Solah Button"	Lata Mangeshkar, Kavita Krishnamurthy & Pamela Chopra	7:35
5.	"Likha Hai Ye In Hawaaon Pe"	Lata Mangeshkar & Hariharan	5:12
6.	"Tu Mere Saamne"	Lata Mangeshkar & Udit Narayan	6:07
7.	"Ishq Da Bura Rog (not in the film)"	Lata Mangeshkar & Vinod Rathod	5:43
8.	"Obsession (Dance Music)"	Instrumental	2:18

== Box office ==
At the domestic Indian box office, Darr became the third highest-grossing film of 1993, after Aankhen and Khalnayak, and was declared a blockbuster. In India, it was released on 190 screens, with 19.96 million tickets sold. Its domestic gross was ₹15.73 crore, including a net income of ₹10.74 crore, which is equivalent to ₹184.4 crore (US$28.32 million) when adjusted for inflation as of 2017. Its domestic gross is equivalent to ₹339 crore (US$52.06 million) when adjusted for inflation as of 2017. (Note: Inflation rate of 17.17 times: ₹10.74 crore domestic net equivalent to ₹184.4 crore (US$28.32 million).)

At the overseas box office, Darr was the year's highest-grossing Indian film of 1993, grossing $500,000 (₹5.58 crore). Worldwide, it grossed ₹21.31 crore (US$6.78 million), equivalent to ₹366 crore (US$56.2 million) when adjusted for inflation as of 2017.

== Awards and nominations ==
Award	Category	Nominee	Result	Ref.
41st National Film Awards	Best Popular Film Providing Wholesome Entertainment	Yash Chopra	Won	
39th Filmfare Awards	Best Comedian	Anupam Kher	Won	
39th Filmfare Awards	Best Cinematography	Manmohan Singh	Won	
39th Filmfare Awards	Best Director	Yash Chopra	Nominated	
39th Filmfare Awards	Best Villain	Shah Rukh Khan	Nominated	
39th Filmfare Awards	Best Music Director	Shiv-Hari	Nominated	
39th Filmfare Awards	Best Lyricist	Anand Bakshi for "Jaadu Teri Nazar"	Nominated	
39th Filmfare Awards	Best Male Playback Singer	Udit Narayan for "Jaadu Teri Nazar"	Nominated	

== Remakes ==
It was remade in Kannada as Preethse, starring Upendra as Chandu (Rahul), Shiva Rajkumar as Surya (Sunil) and Sonali Bendre playing Kiran. The film also partially inspired the 2005 Tamil film Chinna. The Telugu film Tapassu also borrowed some scenes from Darr.

The teaser trailer for an intended five-part web series Darr 2.0 was released on YouTube on August 30, 2016. It was set to be a retelling of the film in a contemporary setting, portraying cyber-stalking and digital crimes. The web series was set to be produced by Ashish Chopra under the banner of Y-Films and directed by Vikash Chandra. Screenplay and dialogues were written by Nikhil Taneja and Shubham Yogi. The series was shelved.

== Legacy ==
Audience and the critics appreciated Shah Rukh Khan's dialogue: "I love you, K-k-k- Kiran" which still remains iconic. Darr was one of the first films of Shah Rukh Khan's career to gain international audiences, until he earned further recognition with Dilwale Dulhania Le Jayenge worldwide, 2 years later.
