= Brij Bhushan Kabra =

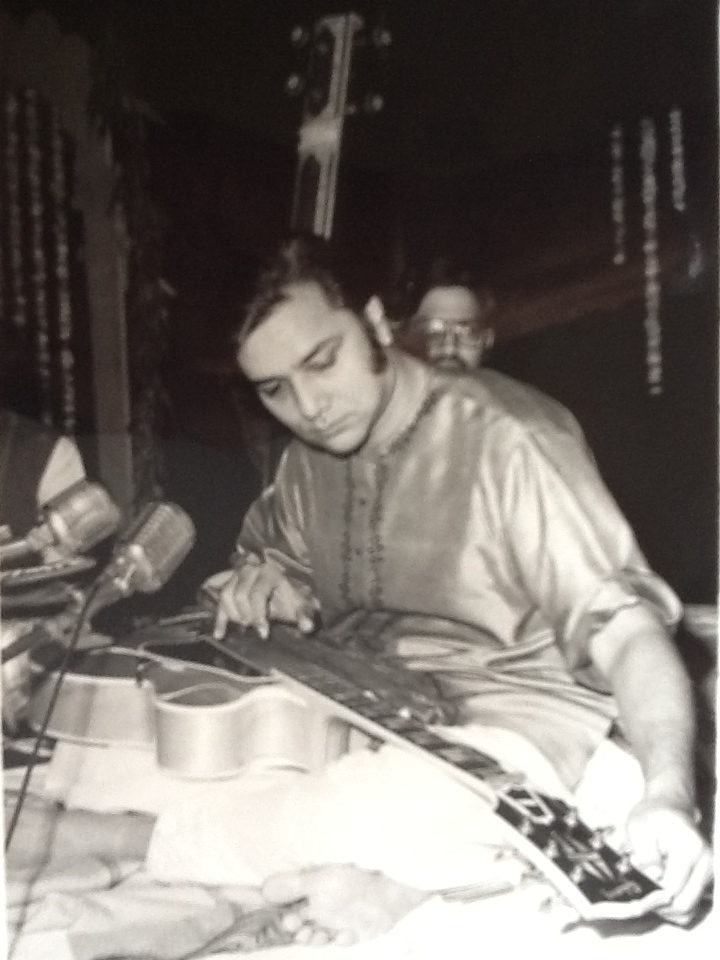
- In concert at Delhi

Background information
- Born: 1937; Jodhpur, Jodhpur State, British India
- Died: 12 April 2018 (aged 81) Ahmedabad, Gujarat, India
- Genres: Hindustani classical music
- Instrument: lap slide guitar
- Formerly of: Debashish Bhattacharya
- Website: www.brijbhushankabra.com

Brij Bhushan Kabra (1937 – 12 April 2018) was an Indian musician who popularized the guitar as an instrument in Indian classical music.

Kabra was born in 1937 to Goverdhanlal Kabra in Jodhpur where he spent his youth. He was interested in sports and listened to Indian classical music but did not intend to become a musician and trained as a geologist. During a visit to Kolkata he discovered the Hawaiian lap slide guitar and convinced his father to let him learn it by promising to only play classical music. Kabra then lived in Ahmedabad, Gujarat, learnt the instrument by imitating records, and later studied under Ali Akbar Khan. He modified the guitar by adding sympathetic and drone strings.

Kabra became the first Indian musician to play raga on the guitar, performed publicly, and recorded the successful album Call of the Valley (1967) with bansuri player Hariprasad Chaurasia and santoor player Shivkumar Sharma. The guitar was seldom used in Indian classical music, and his guitar playing gained popularity in the 1970s hippie culture. Kabra recorded solo albums and concentrated on teaching since the 1990s but continued to perform.

He was awarded the Rajasthan Sangeet Natak Akademi Award for 1983–84, was made a fellow of the Rajasthan Sangeet Natak Akademi for 1995–96, and received the national Sangeet Natak Akademi Award for 2005.

Kabra died on 12 April 2018 in Ahmedabad at age 81.
