= Silsila (1981 film) =

1981 Indian film by Yash Chopra

- Theatrical release poster
- Directed by: Yash Chopra
- Screenplay by: Yash Chopra; Sagar Sarhadi
- Story by: Preeti Bedi
- Produced by: Yash Chopra
- Starring: Shashi Kapoor; Amitabh Bachchan; Jaya Bachchan; Rekha; Sanjeev Kumar
- Cinematography: Kay Gee
- Edited by: Keshav Naidu
- Music by: Shiv–Hari
- Production company: Yash Raj Films
- Distributed by: Yash Raj Films
- Release date: 14 August 1981
- Running time: 180 minutes
- Country: India
- Language: Hindi
- Box office: ₹35 million

Silsila (transl. Continuation) is a 1981 Indian Hindi-language musical romantic drama film co-written, directed, and produced by Yash Chopra. The story revolves around the love triangle of a romantic playwright Amit (Amitabh Bachchan), his wife Shobha (Jaya Bachchan), and his former lover Chandni (Rekha). The soundtrack was composed by Shiv–Hari, with lyrics from Javed Akhtar, Hasan Kamal, Mirabai, Nida Fazli, Rajendra Krishan, and Harivansh Rai Bachchan.

Silsila attracted considerable attention from the media when it was in production due to its casting. Principal photography took place in Amsterdam, Bombay (now Mumbai), Delhi, and Kashmir from November 1980 and May 1981. The film, however, failed at the box office after releasing on 14 August 1981, grossing only ₹30 million (equivalent to ₹670 million or US$7.0 million in 2026). At the 29th Filmfare Awards, the film received nominations for Best Actor (Amitabh Bachchan), Best Actress (Jaya Bachchan), and Best Music Director (Shiv–Hari). Critically, it received negative notice for the story and the cast's performances.

== Plot ==
Orphaned at a young age, brothers Shekhar and Amit Malhotra enjoy a close relationship but live independently. Shekhar, the older brother, is a squadron leader in the Indian Air Force, while Amit is a Delhi-based romantic playwright. Shekhar introduces Amit to his fiancée, Shobha, and the three form a camaraderie. Amit, in turn, meets Chandni and their relationship blossoms into love with hopes of marriage. Before Amit is able to introduce Chandni to Shekhar, Shekhar dies in the Indo-Pakistani War of 1971. Shobha is subsequently revealed to be pregnant with Shekhar's child. Devastated from the loss of Shekhar, Amit marries Shobha to shield her from societal scorn and the stigma of being an unwed mother, and to honor Shekhar's memory. He sends a letter to Chandni ending their relationship, professing his love but urging her to move on, leaving Chandni heartbroken.

Tragedy strikes once more when Amit and Shobha are injured in a car accident and Shobha suffers a miscarriage. She is treated by Dr. V.K. Anand, who is revealed to have married Chandni. Without a child to bind them together, Amit and Shobha settle into their passionless marriage. Amit befriends Dr. Anand in an attempt to rekindle his romance with Chandni, who eventually gives in. They meet secretly, although not without arousing the suspicions of Shobha, who despite her history with Shekhar has come to revere Amit. On the way home from a tryst, Amit and Chandni injure a pedestrian with their car. Their affair is endangered when the policeman investigating the accident happens to be Shobha's cousin, who is protective of Shobha and intends to expose Amit.

Amit decides to leave his loveless marriage to be with Chandni. The news shatters Shobha, who has genuinely fallen for Amit but believes that her love will make him return. Dr. Anand is also aware of Chandni's infidelity and feels devastated. When Dr. Anand leaves on a business trip, Amit and Chandni secretly leave town to start a new life. Anand's plane then crashes, causing Amit, Chandni, and Shobha to rush to the wreckage site. There, Amit is confronted by Shobha, who reveals that she is expecting his child. He vows to return to her, then rushes to rescue Anand from the wreckage. Chandni realizes her love for her husband and returns to him. The film ends with Amit and Shobha living happily in their marriage.

== Cast ==
- Shashi Kapoor as Sqn. Ldr. Shekhar Malhotra
- Amitabh Bachchan as Amit Malhotra
- Jaya Bachchan as Shobha Malhotra
- Rekha as Chandni Anand
- Sanjeev Kumar as Dr. V. K. Anand
- Sudha Chopra as Shobha's mother
- Sushma Seth as Amit's benefactor
- Kulbhushan Kharbanda as police officer Kulbhushan, Shobha's cousin (guest appearance)
- Deven Verma as Vidyarthi (guest appearance)

== Production ==
Silsila was directed and produced by Yash Chopra for his banner Yash Raj Films. He co-wrote the screenplay with Sagar Sarhadi, who also co-wrote the story with Preeti Bedi. According to Sarhadi, Chopra "fell madly in love with the subject". The dialogue was written by Romesh Sharma. The film is about an extramarital relationship, the first time for a Hindi-language film; after he failed with action films, Chopra had decided to make a romantic film for his next venture.

Chopra's biographer Rachel Dwyer described the casting as complicated, for which the film was controversial before release. Speculations about the relationship between Amitabh Bachchan, who was married to Jaya Bachchan, and Rekha was common in gossip magazines and newspapers at the time. Chopra called his ability to cast the three his greatest achievement. He initially considered Parveen Babi and Smita Patil for Rekha's and Jaya Bachchan's parts, respectively, but abandoned the plans owing to their unsuitability in playing their respective roles. On the recommendations of Amitabh Bachchan, who had agreed to star in the film in 1980, Chopra subsequently replaced them with Rekha and Jaya Bachchan. Rekha designed her own costumes and jewellery. This was her final collaboration with Amitabh Bachchan.

Silsila was shot by Raju Kaygee. Filming was done from November 1980 to May 1981, starting in Kashmir and later Amsterdam, Bombay (now Mumbai), and Delhi. Wanting no exposure from the media, Chopra did the filming privately with the entire cast and crew. He described the production as "real life coming into reel life" but said that there are no incidents on the sets and all the lead actors were co-operative. The Delhi schedule sometimes took place at 5.30 PM when the weather was cold; Rekha recounted how she hated it and that she did so only for Chopra. The film, edited by Keshav Naidu, runs for 166 minutes. Hariprasad Chaurasia and Shivkumar Sharma provided the background score.

== Music ==
The soundtrack to the film, released by Saregama on 18 May 1981, was composed by Shiv–Hari. The lyrics were by Javed Akhtar, Hasan Kamal, Mirabai, Nida Fazli, Rajendra Krishan, and Harivansh Rai Bachchan. "Yeh Kahan Aa Gaye Hum" was one of the songs sung by Lata Mangeshkar in her concert "Lata Live". Akhtar, who previously collaborated with Salim Khan in screenwriting, turned to lyrical composition and "Dekha Ek Khwab" was his first written song. Akhtar was chosen after Chopra hearing his poetry and being astonished by it. "Rang Barse Bhige Chunar Wali" became one of the most-played songs in the Holi celebration.

According to the biographer, Rauf Ahmed, Shammi Kapoor apparently came up with the tune of "Neela Aasman So Gaya" spontaneously, inspired from a folk song he had heard, during one of the music sessions with Amitabh Bachchan.

Silsila (Original Motion Picture Soundtrack)
| No. | Title | Lyrics | Singer(s) | Length |
|---|---|---|---|---|
| 1. | "Silsila Theme" (Part 1, Instrumental) | | | 2:12 |
| 2. | "Silsila Theme" (Part 2, Instrumental) | | Shivkumar Sharma | 3:40 |
| 3. | "Silsila Theme" (Part 3, Instrumental) | | Hariprasad Chaurasia | 3:31 |
| 4. | "Neela Aasman So Gaya" (Male; Raga Pahadi) | Javed Akhtar | Amitabh Bachchan | 4:34 |
| 5. | "Dekha Ek Khwab" (with Dialogue; Raga Bhoopali) | Javed Akhtar | Kishore Kumar, Lata Mangeshkar, Amitabh Bachchan | 5:55 |
| 6. | "Yeh Kahan Aa Gaye Hum" (with Dialog) | Javed Akhtar | Lata Mangeshkar, Amitabh Bachchan | 7:39 |
| 7. | "Ladki Hain Ya Shola" | Rajendra Krishan | Kishore Kumar, Lata Mangeshkar | 3:58 |
| 8. | "Neela Aasman So Gaya" (Female; Raga Pahadi) | Javed Akhtar | Lata Mangeshkar | 5:28 |
| 9. | "Dekha Ek Khwab" (Part 1; Raga Bhoopali) | Javed Akhtar | Kishore Kumar, Lata Mangeshkar | 1:26 |
| 10. | "Yeh Kahan Aa Gaye Hum" | Javed Akhtar | Lata Mangeshkar, Amitabh Bachchan | 7:54 |
| 11. | "Rang Barse Bhige Chunar Wali" | Harivansh Rai Bachchan | Amitabh Bachchan | 6:06 |
| 12. | "Dekha Ek Khwab" (Part 2; Raga Bhoopali) | Javed Akhtar | Kishore Kumar, Lata Mangeshkar | 5:20 |
| 13. | "Sar Se Sarke" | Hasan Kamal | Kishore Kumar, Lata Mangeshkar | 5:41 |
| 14. | "Jo Tum Todo Piya" (Raga Kirwani) | Mirabai | Lata Mangeshkar | 3:35 |
| 15. | "Khud Se Jo Vada Kiya Tha" | Nida Fazli | Pamela Chopra | 4:06 |
| 16. | "Bahan Jinah Di Pakdiye" | | Ragi Harbans Singh Jagadhri Wale | 2:23 |
| Total length: | | | | 73:38 |

== Release and reception ==
Silsila was released on 14 August 1981 and failed at the box office, which Chopra believed was due to the audience's attentions mostly given to the controversy, resulted by the casting, rather than the plot. Around a week later, a screening was held at the Mumbai Metro and collected ₹1.5 million (US$16,000), with ₹1 million (US$10,000) being donated to the Nargis Dutt Foundation. Sunil Sethi of India Today criticized the cliché storyline and called the cast uninteresting. In his review, Sethi concluded,

"But Silsila itself is pure polyester yarn. It's a lot less real than the so-called dirty, distorted and damaging stories that appear in the gossip press which the stars claim are so distressing. At least they read better, look better and may be include half-truths here and there. Silsila looks good, too, but is a distortion of half-lies, which is worse."

Dwyer wrote that Amitabh Bachchan's then-popular screen persona as an "angry young man", which he got from Deewaar (1975), was incompatible with his role in Silsila as a lover. The film received three nominations at the 29th Filmfare Awards: Best Actor (Amitabh Bachchan), Best Actress (Jaya Bachchan), and Best Music Director (Shiv–Hari). It marked the beginning of the setback in Chopra's career; in spite of this, he called Silsila one of his favourite films in a 2011 interview.
