= Yash Chopra =

Indian filmmaker (1932–2012)

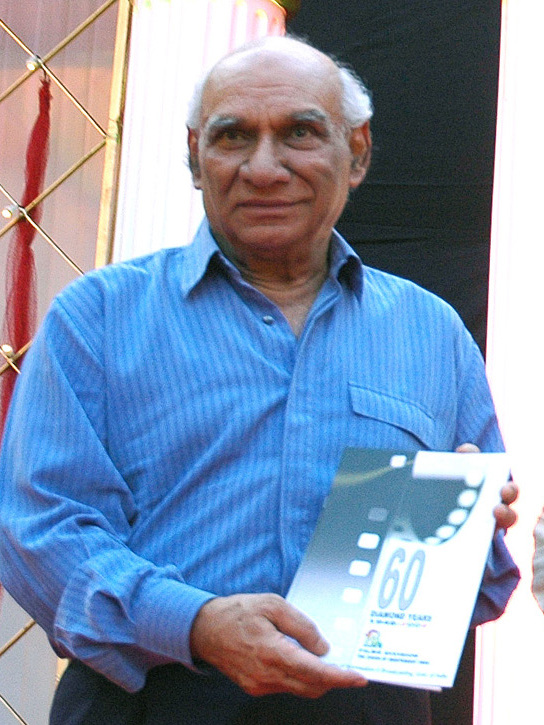
- Chopra in 2009
- Born: Yash Raj Chopra; 27 September 1932; Lahore, Punjab, British India
- Died: 21 October 2012 (aged 80); Mumbai, Maharashtra, India
- Occupations: Film director; Film producer
- Years active: 1959–2012
- Organization: Yash Raj Films
- Works: Full list
- Spouse: Pamela Singh (m. 1970)
- Children: Aditya Chopra; Uday Chopra
- Relatives: Chopra family

Yash Raj Chopra (27 September 1932 – 21 October 2012) was an Indian film director and film producer who worked in Hindi cinema. The founding chairman of the film production and distribution company Yash Raj Films, Chopra was the recipient of several awards, including 6 National Film Awards and 8 Filmfare Awards. He is considered among the best Hindi filmmakers, particularly known and admired for his romantic films with strong female leads. For his contributions to film, the Government of India honoured him with the Dadasaheb Phalke Award in 2001, and the Padma Bhushan in 2005. In 2006, the British Academy of Film and Television Arts presented him with a lifetime membership, making him the first Indian to receive the honour.

Chopra began his career as an assistant director to I. S. Johar and his elder brother, B. R. Chopra. He made his directorial debut with Dhool Ka Phool in 1959, a melodrama about illegitimacy, and followed it with the social drama Dharmputra (1961). Chopra rose to prominence after directing the critically and commercially successful family drama Waqt (1965), which pioneered the concept of ensemble casts in Bollywood. In 1970, he founded his own production company, Yash Raj Films, whose first production was Daag: A Poem of Love (1973), a successful melodrama about polygamy. His success continued in the seventies, with some of Indian cinema's most successful and iconic films, including the action-thriller Deewaar (1975), which established Amitabh Bachchan as a leading actor in Bollywood; the ensemble musical romantic drama Kabhi Kabhie (1976) and the ensemble family drama Trishul (1978).

Chopra collaborated with Sridevi in two of what has been considered to be his finest films; the romantic musical Chandni (1989), which became instrumental in ending the era of violent films in Bollywood and rejuvenating the romantic musical genre, and the intergenerational musical romantic drama Lamhe (1991), considered by critics and Chopra himself to be his best work, but underperformed at the domestic box-office, although bringing major profits overseas. After helming the critically panned Parampara (1993), Chopra directed the musical psychological thriller Darr (1993), the first of his collaborations with Shahrukh Khan. Chopra directed three more romantic films, all starring Khan; Dil To Pagal Hai (1997), Veer-Zaara (2004) and Jab Tak Hai Jaan (2012), before announcing his retirement from direction in 2012. He died of dengue fever during Jab Tak Hai Jaan's production in 2012. He is considered one of the all-time best directors of the Hindi film industry.

== Early life ==
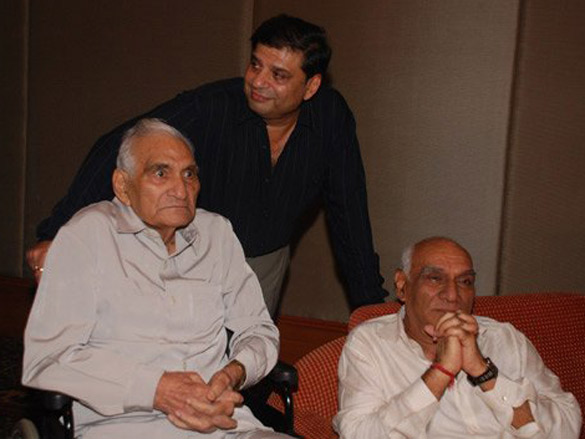
Chopra with his brother B. R. Chopra at an event in 2007

Chopra was born on 27 September 1932 in Lahore, Punjab Province, British India into a Punjabi Hindu Khatri family. His father was an accountant in the PWD division of the British Punjab administration. He was the youngest of eight children, the oldest of whom was almost 30 years his senior. One of his sisters, Hiroo Johar, was married to film producer Yash Johar, and the eminent film-maker B. R. Chopra is one of his brothers, thus making him the uncle of Ravi Chopra and Karan Johar.

Chopra was largely brought up in the Lahore house of his second brother, B. R. Chopra, then a film journalist. Chopra studied at Doaba College Jalandhar and originally sought to pursue a career in engineering. He later moved to Ludhiana, East Punjab (in India) after the Partition of India.

Like many other Punjabi Hindu families, who were associated with the Arya Samaj movement, in his youth Chopra was a member of the Rashtriya Swayamsevak Sangh, later in his life he would recall that he didn't see it as a Hindu nationalist organisation but as a club of boy-scouts with emphasis on physical training as well mental health, through kabaddi and yoga.

His passion for film-making led him to travel to Bombay, where he initially worked as an assistant director to I. S. Johar, and then for his director-producer brother, B. R. Chopra, while another brother, Dharam Chopra, worked as his cameraman.

== Career ==
=== Early career (1959–1970) ===
Chopra received his first directorial opportunity in 1959 with the social drama Dhool Ka Phool, produced by his elder brother B. R. Chopra and starring Mala Sinha, Rajendra Kumar and Nanda. The film revolved around a Muslim bringing up an "illegitimate" Hindu child. The film was well received by critics and became the fourth highest-grossing film of the year. Encouraged by their success, the Chopras made another hard-hitting social drama, Dharmputra (1961). It was one of the first films to depict the Partition of India and Hindu fundamentalism. The film marked the debut of Shashi Kapoor in a fully fledged role and was awarded with the National Film Award for Best Feature Film in Hindi.

Chopra's collaboration with his brother continued in the form of the 1965 film Waqt, which featured an ensemble cast including Sunil Dutt, Raaj Kumar, Shashi Kapoor, Sadhana, Balraj Sahni, Madan Puri, Sharmila Tagore, Achala Sachdev and Rehman. The film became a critical and commercial success. It is acknowledged as a "found film" of the "lost-and-found" genre. Setting many other trends, it was one of Indian cinema's first multi-starrers, a mode which became increasingly popular among the producers during the 1970s. It also began the now-obligatory style of depicting wealth and social class. Chopra received his first Filmfare Award for Best Director for the film.

In 1969, Chopra directed two films produced by his brother. The first was Aadmi Aur Insaan, which featured Dharmendra and Saira Banu in the lead roles. He directed Ittefaq (1969), a mystery thriller film based on a Gujarati play, depicting the events of a single night, with Rajesh Khanna and Nanda in the lead roles. Shot in a month and on a low budget, the film was deemed unusual by critics. Despite a being a slow starter, it eventually became a hit and won Chopra his second Filmfare Award for Best Director.

=== Formation of Yash Raj Films, continued success, setback and resurgence (1971–1992) ===
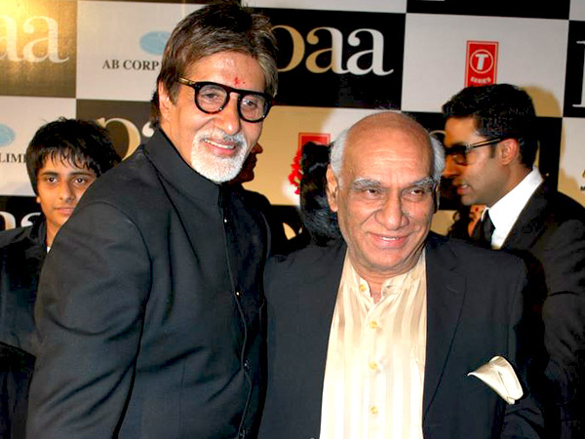
Chopra with actor Amitabh Bachchan at the premiere of Paa in 2009

His first independently produced film, Daag: A Poem of Love (1973), a melodrama about polygamy, starring Rajesh Khanna, Sharmila Tagore and Raakhee was a superhit and won Chopra his third Filmfare Award for Best Director.

He directed a number of cult classics starring Shashi Kapoor and Amitabh Bachchan, and scripted by Salim–Javed, notably Deewaar (1975) and Trishul (1978), which were major critical and commercial successes and remain popular even today. These films set the trend for the late-'70s and '80s, establishing Bachchan as the "angry young man". Chopra produced, directed and scripted two more films starring the duo. Unlike his earlier action-oriented films, these were musical romantic dramas: Kabhi Kabhie (1976), co-starring Waheeda Rehman, Raakhee, Rishi Kapoor and Neetu Singh, followed by Silsila (1981), co-starring Jaya Bachchan, Rekha and Sanjeev Kumar. Chopra suggested Javed Akhtar to become a lyricist, starting from this film. He also directed the duo in the action drama Kaala Patthar (1979), based on the Chasnala mining disaster. The film emerged a box office hit and received several Filmfare Award nominations.

The 1980s marked a professional setback in Chopra's career, as several films he directed and produced in that period failed to leave a mark at the Indian box-office. His film Mashaal (1984) was his first collaboration with the legendary actor, Dilip Kumar. The action-oriented film, which was based on the well-known Marathi play titled Ashroonchi Zhali Phule, received critical acclaim, but fared only average at the box-office. A year later, he made Faasle, a romantic drama starring Sunil Dutt, Rekha, Rohan Kapoor and Farah, which proved to be a critical and commercial disaster at the box-office. He and critics consider it his worst film. Vijay (1988) was also a box-office failure. The film received mixed-to-negative reviews from critics and was dubbed a remake of Trishul.

Chopra's lean phase ended in 1989 with the highly-successful romantic musical Chandni, a film with all the hallmarks of what has come to be known as the "Yash Chopra style": heroine-oriented, romantic, emotional, depicting the lifestyle of the elite, with melodious music used in songs picturised in foreign locations. It marked the first collaboration between Chopra and Sridevi. The huge success of its soundtrack was instrumental in ending the era of violence in Bollywood films and bringing back music into Hindi films. After a string of critically and commercially films, the success of Chandni consolidated Sridevi's position as the top female Bollywood star of the era. Though it was not the first time Chopra shot a film in Switzerland, the extensive scenes shot there made it a popular tourist destination for Indians. The film won the National Film Award for Best Popular Film Providing Wholesome Entertainment for 1989, in addition to earning Chopra his eighth nomination for the Filmfare Award for Best Director.

He followed it with Lamhe (1991) an intergenerational musical romantic drama starring frequent collaborators Sridevi and Anil Kapoor. The film received widespread critical acclaim, had exceptional music, and was one of the biggest Bollywood hits in the overseas market; however, it was a flop in India due to its controversial storyline. The film won five Filmfare Awards, including the Filmfare Award for Best Film, and earned Chopra his ninth nomination for the Filmfare Award for Best Director. Over the years, Lamhe has been hailed as a cult classic; it is regarded as a modern masterpiece and possibly his finest film to date. It was featured in Outlook magazine's list of All-Time Great Indian films. It has been cited by Chopra as his personal favourite of his films.

In 1992, Chopra directed Parampara. Despite an all-star cast of Ramya Krishnan, Aamir Khan, Raveena Tandon, Sunil Dutt, Anupam Kher, Vinod Khanna, Ashwini Bhave and Saif Ali Khan (in his film debut), the film was a commercial failure and was panned by critics for its weak storyline and soundtrack, although Chopra's direction was commended.

=== Later career (1993–2012) ===
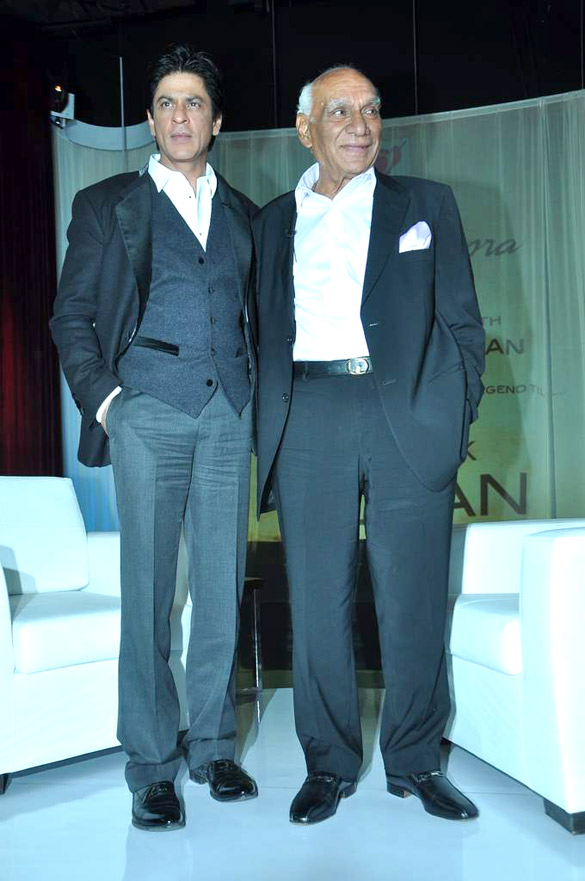
Chopra with actor Shahrukh Khan at a promotional event for their film Jab Tak Hai Jaan in 2012

In 1993, Chopra directed the newcomer Shahrukh Khan along with Juhi Chawla and Sunny Deol in the musical psychological thriller Darr. The film depicted the story of an obsessed lover (Khan) and the lengths to which he goes to pursue a woman (Chawla) who is already happily engaged to another man (Deol). The film was a runaway success and is now considered a cult classic. Darr emerged as one of the highest-grossing Hindi films of 1993. It also established Khan as a bankable star and earned Chopra the National Film Award for Best Popular Film Providing Wholesome Entertainment, in addition to his tenth nomination for the Filmfare Award for Best Director.

In 1995, Chopra launched the television production house Metavision. This company produced a singing reality show Meri Awaaz Suno (1995–1997), a talk show Meri Pasand (1995–1996), and a telefilm Humko Ishq Ne Mara (1997).

In 1997, Chopra directed, produced and co-wrote the musical romantic drama Dil To Pagal Hai, starring yet again Shahrukh Khan in a love quadrangle with Madhuri Dixit, Karisma Kapoor and Akshay Kumar. It was the first Bollywood film to be shot in Germany. The film became the highest grosser for the year and won several awards, including 8 Filmfare Awards (including an eleventh nomination for the Filmfare Award for Best Director for Chopra) and 3 National Film Awards, including the National Film Award for Best Popular Film Providing Wholesome Entertainment. Chopra then took a sabbatical from directing and focused solely on producing films for over 7 years.

In 2004, he returned to direction with the epic love saga Veer-Zaara. Starring Shahrukh Khan again, Preity Zinta and Rani Mukerji in lead roles, the film was the biggest hit of 2004 in both domestic and overseas markets, with a worldwide gross of over ₹940 million and was screened at the Berlin Film Festival to high critical appreciation. The film which narrated the star-crossed love story of an Indian air-force officer Veer Pratap Singh (Khan) and a Pakistani woman, Zaara Hayaat Khan (Zinta) was highly appreciated by critics. Rama Sharma from The Tribune wrote: "Giving love its due, Chopra has understandably linked the script to the life of a common man. The pace is exacting. Drawing from the best of the two countries, the story is made more colorful by a spray of the Punjabi culture—be it celebrating Lohri in India or visiting a dargah in Pakistan. He has handled the script cleverly. Whenever the pace begins to slacken, he introduces a new character and a twist." Veer-Zaara won 4 Filmfare Awards, including the Filmfare Award for Best Film, and earned Chopra a record-setting twelfth nomination for the Filmfare Award for Best Director. The film also won the National Film Award for Best Popular Film Providing Wholesome Entertainment.

In September 2012, in a special interview with actor Shahrukh Khan on the occasion of his 80th birthday, Chopra announced that Jab Tak Hai Jaan (2012) would be his last directorial venture and that he would opt to focus on his production company and his personal life. For the shoot of the last remaining song in Jab Tak Hai Jaan, director Yash Chopra wanted to shoot a scene with a sari-clad Katrina Kaif romancing Shahrukh Khan in the lush meadows of the Swiss Alps. But his illness, caused by a bout of dengue, stymied the plan for the song, which would have reflected his trademark directorial style.

=== Frequent collaborations ===
Chopra was known to often cast the same actors in his films, his most famous collaborations being with Amitabh Bachchan, Sanjeev Kumar, Madan Puri, Amrish Puri, Prem Chopra, Nirupa Roy, Aruna Irani, Bindu, Manmohan Krishna, Poonam Dhillon, Parikshit Sahni, Shashi Kapoor, Rishi Kapoor, Neetu Singh, Rekha, Sharmila Tagore, Raakhee, Rajesh Khanna, Sunil Dutt, Anil Kapoor, Waheeda Rehman, Hema Malini, Sridevi, Anupam Kher, Iftekhar, Achala Sachdev, Vikas Anand and Shahrukh Khan.

== Personal life ==
=== Family ===
In 1970, Chopra married Pamela Singh and together they have two sons Aditya Chopra and Uday Chopra, born in 1971 and 1973, respectively. Aditya Chopra is also a film director and producer and holds the position of chairman and managing director of Yash Raj Films, while Uday is an assistant director turned actor who made his acting debut in 2000 in his brother's directorial, Mohabbatein. Uday is currently the Director – Yash Raj Films, CEO – YRF Entertainment.

=== Religion ===
Chopra was born into an Arya Samaji family, a Hindu reformist movement noted for pushing social reforms, and in her book on Chopra Rachel Dwyer would say it had an influence at many levels: at a personal level, Chopra would refuse to identify as a Khatri, as it'd appear casteist; when it comes to his filmmaking style, the Chopra film clan in general would make movies containing a message of social change.

== Death ==
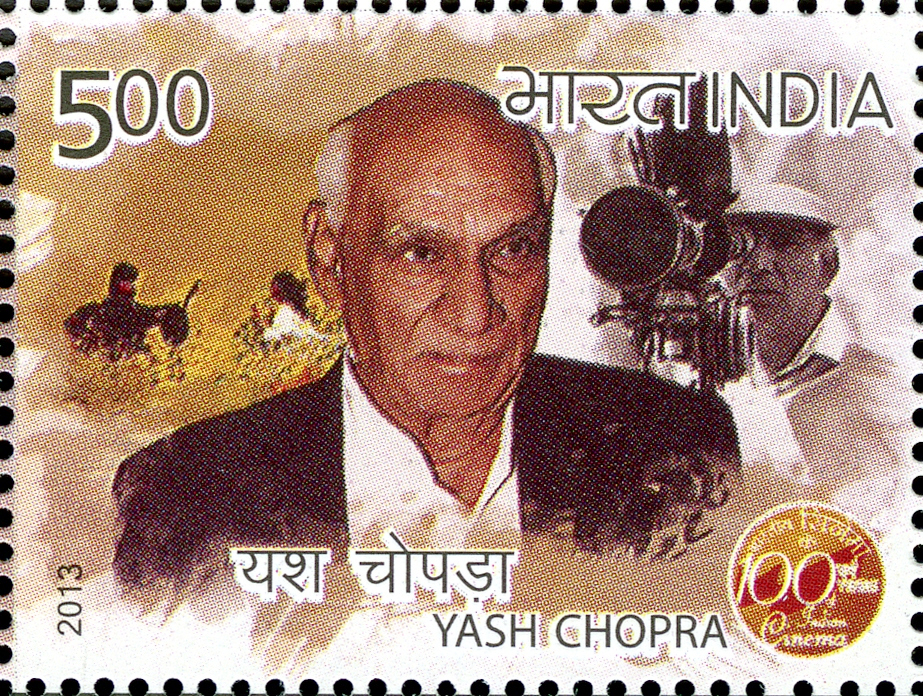
Chopra on a 2013 Indian stamp.

On 13 October 2012, Chopra was diagnosed with dengue fever and was admitted to Lilavati Hospital in Bandra, Mumbai. On 21 October, Yash Chopra succumbed to death following multiple organ failure. He was 80 years of age. The Chautha ceremony for Yash Chopra was held on 25 October 2012 at Yash Raj Films studio. Yash Chopra's final rites took place at Pawan Hans crematorium on 22 October 2012.

== Awards ==
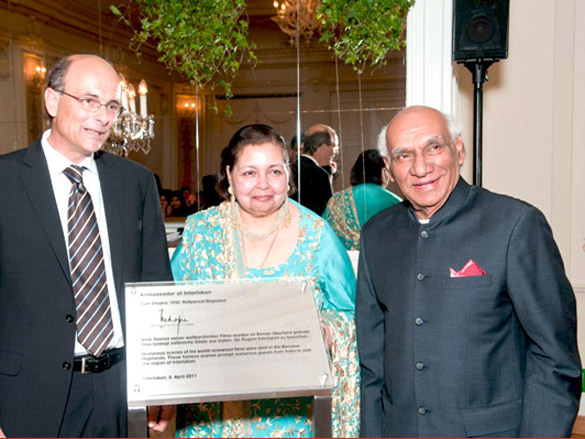
Chopra with his wife Pamela Chopra at an award show in 2011

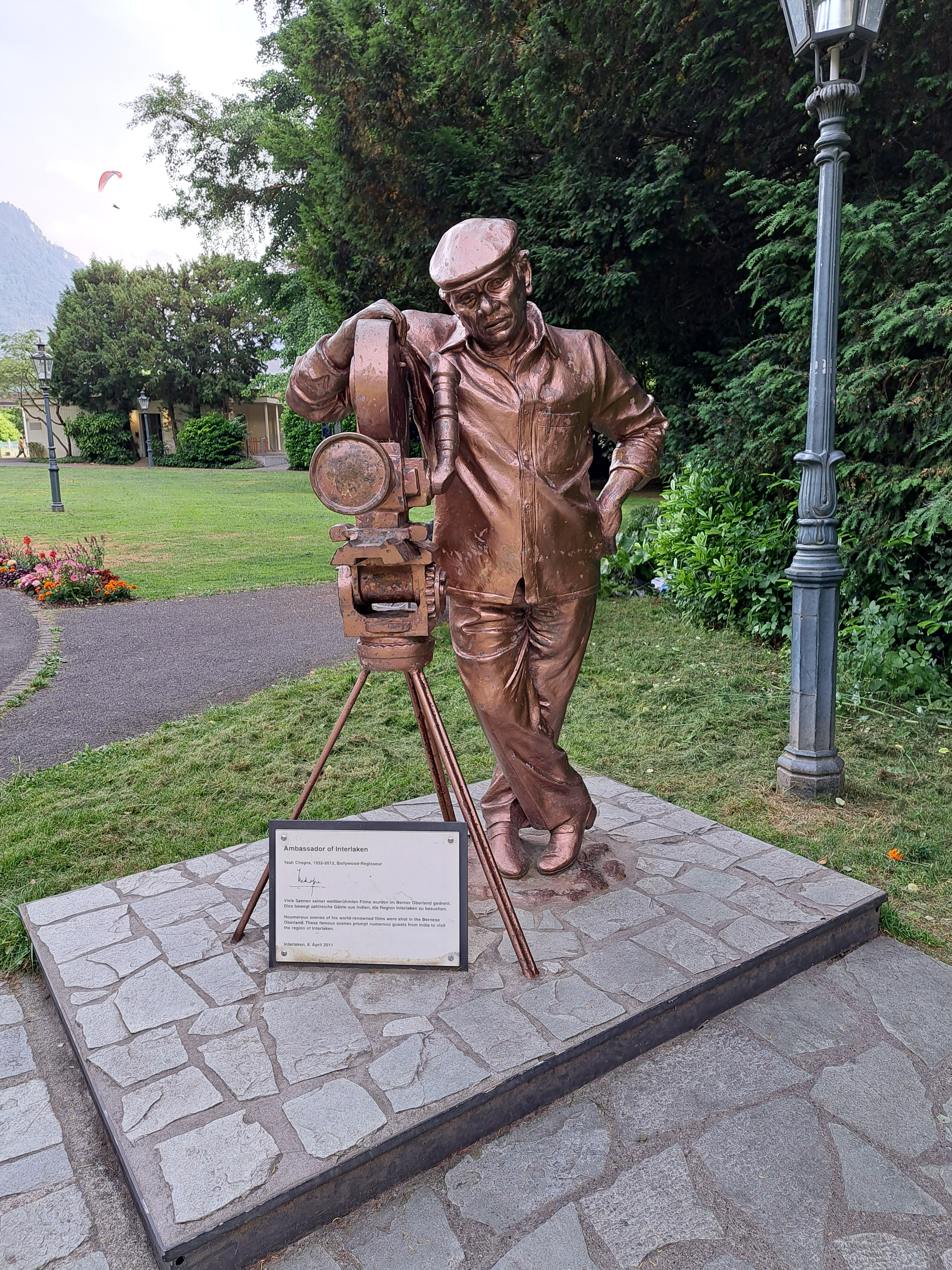
Statue of Chopra in Interlaken, Switzerland

Year	Award	Category	Film
1961	National Film Awards	Best Feature Film in Hindi	Dharamputra
1989	National Film Awards	Best Popular Film Providing Wholesome Entertainment	Chandni
1993	National Film Awards	Best Popular Film Providing Wholesome Entertainment	Darr
1995	National Film Awards	Best Popular Film Providing Wholesome Entertainment	Dilwale Dulhaniya Le Jayenge
1997	National Film Awards	Best Popular Film Providing Wholesome Entertainment	Dil To Pagal Hai
2004	National Film Awards	Best Popular Film Providing Wholesome Entertainment	Veer-Zaara
2008	National Film Awards	Best Popular Film Providing Wholesome Entertainment	Chak De India
1992	Filmfare Awards	Best Film	Lamhe
1996	Filmfare Awards	Best Film	Dilwale Dulhaniya Le Jayenge
1998	Filmfare Awards	Best Film	Dil To Pagal Hai
2005	Filmfare Awards	Best Film	Veer-Zaara
1966	Filmfare Awards	Best Director	Waqt
1970	Filmfare Awards	Best Director	Ittefaq
1974	Filmfare Awards	Best Director	Daag
1976	Filmfare Awards	Best Director	Deewaar
2006	Filmfare Awards	Power Award	Special Award
2007	Filmfare Awards	Power Award	Special Award
2008	Filmfare Awards	Power Award	Special Award
2013	Filmfare Awards	Lifetime Achievement Award	All of his films
2002	IIFA Awards	Outstanding Contribution to Indian Cinema	All of his films
2005	IIFA Awards	Best Film	Veer-Zaara
2005	IIFA Awards	Best Director	Veer-Zaara
2008	IIFA Awards	Best Film	Chak De India
2013	IIFA Awards	IIFA 2013 Macau is dedicated to Mr. Yash Chopra	Special Award
1998	Zee Cine Awards	Best Film	Dil To Pagal Hai
2005	Zee Cine Awards	Best Film	Veer-Zaara
2005	Zee Cine Awards	Best Director	Veer-Zaara
2008	Zee Cine Awards	Best Film	Chak De India
1996	Screen Awards	Best Film	Dilwale Dulhaniya Le Jayenge
2005	Screen Awards	Best Film	Veer-Zaara
2008	Screen Awards	Best Film	Chak De India
2013	Screen Awards	Lifetime Achievement Award	All of his films
2005	Bollywood Movie Awards	Best Film	Veer-Zaara
2005	Bollywood Movie Awards	Best Director	Veer-Zaara

=== Honours and recognitions ===
- 1996: Founder Trustee of Film Industry Welfare Trust established.
- 1998 & 2001: Received BBC Asia Awards in both years – in 1998 and 2001 for his outstanding contribution to films.
- 2001: Dadasaheb Phalke Award, the topmost and the highest honour given in the Indian film industry.
- 2001: Dr. Dadabhai Naoroji Millennium Lifetime Achievement award.
- 2003-2012: Vice-President of the Film Producers’ Guild of India for 10 years.
- 2005: Padma Bhushan, India's third highest civilian honours.
- 2005: Honoured along with the Egyptian comedian Adel Emam and the Oscar-winning actor Morgan Freeman as the Asian, Arab and Hollywood honorees in the Dubai International Film Festival "In the Spotlight", which honours the work of eminent actors, producers and directors from around the world for their distinguished service to the film industry.
- 2006: A lifetime membership to BAFTA for his contribution to the Indian film industry. He is the first Indian to be honoured at BAFTA in 59-year history of the academy.
- 2006: Punjab Rattan, Punjab's highest civilian honour.
- 2006: Lifetime Achievement Award at the 4th Pune International Film Festival (P.I.F.F.)
- 2007: The veteran director was on the advisory board of the Information & Broadcasting Ministry of the Government of India.
- 2007: He has been given the Maharashtra state government's Raj Kapoor and V. Shantaram’ Awards, in recognition of his impressive contributions to the Hindi film industry.
- 13 November 2007: Chopra was conferred the Zenith Asia Honour for his contribution to Indian cinema.
- 5 July 2008: France's Legion of Honour
- 2008: FIAPF Award for Outstanding Achievement in Film at the Asia Pacific Screen Awards.
- 2009: Yash Chopra received the Lifetime Achievement Award at Satya Brahma-founded India Leadership Conclave, moderated by NDTV.
- 2009: Pusan International Film Festival – Asian Filmmaker of the Year
- 2010: National Kishore Kumar Award by the Government of Madhya Pradesh.
- 2010: Honoured by the Swiss Government for rediscovering Switzerland, and recently, he was presented a Special Award by Ursula Andress on behalf of the Swiss Government.
- 2010: Swiss Ambassador's Award for his contribution in promoting "Brand Switzerland" through his movies.
- October 2010: Chopra was given the Outstanding Achievement in Cinema award at The Asian Awards.
- 2011: Chopra was honoured with the title of Ambassador of Interlaken.
- 2011: In Mumbai, the India Leadership Conclave felicitated him in the category of "Excellence in outstanding contribution to Indian Cinema".
- 2013: Awarded the "Father of Contemporary Indian Cinema" at Indian Film Festival of Melbourne (IFFM).
- The Jaipur International Film Festival-JIFF's Outstanding Lifetime Achievement Award was presented to the 'King of Romance,' Yash Raj Chopra on 17 January 2025 in Jaipur. The award was accepted by his grandson, Rishab Chopra.
- 3 May 2013: A postage stamp, bearing his likeness, was released by India Post to honour him.
- Handpicked by the British Film Institute for a book written by Rachel Dwyer in their "World Directors Series". This book showcases the glorious five-decade career of Yash Chopra.
- Certificate of Recognition from the British Tourist Authority and British Film Commission for promoting tourism in the UK through his films.
- Vocational Excellence Award by the Rotary Club
- Outstanding Achievement Awards by the apex bodies of Indian Industry – like the Confederation of Indian Industry (CII).
- Honoured by National Association of Software and Service Companies (NASSCOM) and All India Association of Industries (AIAI) for his outstanding achievements.
- He has also been awarded the Priyadarshini Award for his outstanding contribution to Indian cinema.

=== Honorary Doctorate degrees ===
- 2004: by the Guru Nanak University, Amritsar, India in recognition of his stature as a leading luminary of India.
- 2007: by the Leeds Metropolitan University in Yorkshire.
- 2008: by the Panjab University, Chandigarh, India for his contribution to Indian cinema.
- 2010: from the School of Oriental and African Studies.
- 2012 Honorary Professorship from Trinity College Dublin.

=== Memorial Awards ===
The Yash Chopra Memorial Award ceremonies were instituted by the TSR Foundation of T. Subbarami Reddy, which carries Rs 10.00 lakhs cash and citation. These awards ceremonies started in 2013, on the eve of Chopra's death and are dedicated to his memory. The ceremonies are held annually in Mumbai, and feature awards to people in recognition of their outstanding contribution in the field of art and culture.

Ordinal	Date
1	17 February 2018
2	25 December 2014
3	25 January 2016
4	25 February 2017
5	17 February 2018

== See also ==
- The Romantics (documentary) (2023)
- Yash Raj Films
