= Call of the Valley =

Studio album by Hariprasad Chaurasia, Brij Bhushan Kabra, and Shivkumar Sharma
- Released: 1968
- Genre: Hindustani classical music
- Length: 39:46; 70:55 (remastered rerelease)
- Label: His Master's Voice

Professional ratings
Review scores
Source	Rating
Allmusic	5/5 stars

Call of the Valley is a collaborative studio album by Hariprasad Chaurasia, Brij Bhushan Kabra, and Shivkumar Sharma, recorded and released in 1968 on the label His Master's Voice. Conceived as a suite, the instrumental album follows a day in the life of an Indian shepherd from Kashmir, using ragas associated with various times of the day to advance the dramatic narrative. Brij Bhushan Kabra plays slide guitar, Shivkumar Sharma plays the santoor, and Hariprasad Chaurasia plays the flute and bansuri, with tabla played by Manikrao Popatkar. The atmospheric music is traditional, but the innovative use of guitar and flute make the sound more suitable for Western audiences. Most of the artists were about 30 at the time of recording.

Call of the Valley helped to introduce Indian music to Western ears and became the best selling Indian music album worldwide, becoming a milestone in world music. The artists became well known after the album's release. Beatles Paul McCartney and George Harrison, Byrds members David Crosby and Roger McGuinn, and Bob Dylan are fans of the album. AllMusic reviewer Ken Hunt advises that "If the newcomer buys only one Indian classical recording, it should be "Call of the Valley"." It is listed in the book 1001 Albums You Must Hear Before You Die.

== Track listing ==
1. Ahir Bhairav/Nat Bhairav - 12:35
2. Rag Piloo - 07:58
3. Bhoop - 06:16
4. Rag Des - 06:09
5. Rag Pahadi - 06:48

The remastered edition on hEMIsphere has three bonus tracks.

1. Ghara-Dadra (Bonus Track 1) - 07:25
2. Dhun-Mishra Kirwani (Bonus Track 2) - 12:58
3. Bageshwari (Bonus Track 3) - 10:46
