= Films Division of India =

Government-owned film production company

- Type: Public
- Industry: Electronic media
- Genre: Electronic
- Founded: 1948; 78 years ago
- Founder: Government of India
- Defunct: 30 March 2022; 4 years ago
- Fate: merged with National Film Development Corporation.
- Headquarters: 24, Dr. G. Deshmukh Marg, Ministry of I&B, Mumbai-26
- Number of locations: Branches and Production centres: Kolkata; Bangalore; New Delhi; Chennai; Thiruvananthapuram; Hyderabad; Vijayawada
- Parent: Ministry of Information and Broadcasting
- Website: www.filmsdivision.org

The Films Division of India (FDI), commonly referred as Films Division, was established in 1948 following the independence of India. It was the first state film production and distribution unit, under the Ministry of Information and Broadcasting, Government of India, with its main intent being to "produce documentaries and news magazines for publicity of Government programmes" and the cinematic record of Indian history.

FDI was divided into four wings: Production, Distribution, International Documentary and Short Film Festival. The Division produces documentaries/news magazines from its headquarters in Mumbai, films on defence and family welfare from New Delhi and featurettes focussing on rural India from the regional centres at Calcutta ( now Kolkata) and Bangalore. In 1990, it was started at the annual Mumbai International Film Festival, for documentary, short and animation films at Mumbai. It housed a museum of cinema, the National Museum of Indian Cinema (NMIC), inaugurated on 19 January 2019.

In March 2022, it was merged with National Film Development Corporation.

== History ==
Established in 1948, FDI followed the model of state controlled and monopolized production, distribution and exhibition of documentary films, news reels and propaganda films, soon transforming into the biggest producer documentary and short film production in the country. For decades to come, FDI would produce thousands of documentaries and newsreels that would reach as many as 25 million Indians a week. As James Beveridge of the National Film Board of Canada would later observe, FDI “delivered a body of documentaries and newsreels which must constitute the largest peace-time programme of public information films ever seen among the democratic countries.”

== Works ==
Films Division had produced mainly for the state-owned TV channel, Doordarshan. It produced some classics like Ek Anek Aur Ekta. The films division had produced over 8000 films since inception and about 5000 films are being made available for online purchase and downloads.

== Film club ==
In 2012 Films Division started a film club at Mumbai which screens films from archives.

== NMIC ==
The Prime Minister of India Narendra Modi inaugurated National Museum of Indian Cinema in Mumbai on 19 January 2019. The “National Museum of Indian Cinema” is a store house of information for the public and it facilitates the film makers, film students and critics to know about the development of cinema in the world.

== Selected filmography ==
- Rabindranath Tagore (1961), by Satyajit Ray
- Through the Eyes of a Painter (1967), by M. F. Hussain
- The House That Ananda Built (1968)
- Mahatma: Life of Gandhi, 1869–1948 (1968)
- The Awakener (1969) A film on Meher Baba
- Aao Hajj Karen (1980)
- Bansuri Guru (2013)
