= Sahibaan =

- DVD cover
- Directed by: Ramesh Talwar
- Written by: Armaan Shahabi
- Produced by: D.K. Chawla
- Starring: Sanjay Dutt; Madhuri Dixit; Rishi Kapoor
- Cinematography: K.K. Mahajan
- Edited by: Naresh Malhotra
- Music by: Shiv-Hari
- Release date: 16 July 1993 (India)
- Running time: 140 minutes
- Country: India
- Language: Hindi

Sahibaan is a 1993 Indian Hindi-language romantic drama film directed by Ramesh Talwar. It features Rishi Kapoor, Sanjay Dutt and Madhuri Dixit in the lead roles. It marked Kapoor's fourth onscreen collaboration with Talwar after Doosra Aadmi (1977), Duniya (1984) and Zamana (1985) and second with Dutt as well after Hathyar (1989).

There were many films before the one in 1993 based on the same folk story. Mirza Sahibaan in one such film.

== Cast ==
- Rishi Kapoor as Gopi
- Sanjay Dutt as Kunwar Vijay Pal Singh
- Madhuri Dixit as Sahibaan
- Sonu Walia as Rajkumari Razee
- Bharat Kapoor as Diwan Durga Singh
- Kiran Kumar as Tikka
- Satyendra Kapoor as Balakram
- Javed Khan as Kheru
- Anjana Mumtaz as Mrs. Balakram
- Beena Banerjee as Mrs. Tikka
- Mangal Dhillon as Police Inspector
- Tinnu Anand as Inder - film director
- Sudhir Pandey as Inder's Guide

== Soundtrack ==
Anand Bakshi wrote the songs.

#	Title	Singer(s)
1	"Sahibaan Meri Sahibaan"	Jolly Mukherjee, Anuradha Paudwal
2	"Is Mele Mein Log Aate Hain"	Jolly Mukherjee, Anuradha Paudwal
3	"Tu Kya Pyar Karega"	Anuradha Paudwal
4	"Main Botal Nahin Sharab Ki"	Anuradha Paudwal
5	"Are Jaane Wale"	Anuradha Paudwal
6	"Bansuri Yeh Bansuri"	Hariharan
7	"Prem Hai Deepak Raag"	Afroz Bano
