= Parampara (1993 film) =

- Theatrical release poster
- Directed by: Yash Chopra
- Screenplay by: Aditya Chopra; Honey Irani
- Dialogues by: Rahi Masoom Raza; Additional Dialogues: Surendra Prakash
- Story by: Honey Irani
- Produced by: Firoz A. Nadiadwala
- Starring: Sunil Dutt; Vinod Khanna; Aamir Khan; Saif Ali Khan; Neelam; Raveena Tandon; Ashwini Bhave; Ramya Krishna; Anupam Kher
- Cinematography: Manmohan Singh
- Edited by: Keshav Naidu
- Music by: Shiv-Hari
- Distributed by: A G Films
- Release date: 14 May 1993
- Running time: 155 minutes
- Country: India
- Language: Hindi

Parampara (transl. Tradition) is a 1993 Indian Hindi-language action drama film directed by Yash Chopra. It was the last time Chopra directed a film outside his production house Yash Raj Films. It features an ensemble cast of Sunil Dutt, Vinod Khanna, Ashwini Bhave, Aamir Khan, Saif Ali Khan, Ramya Krishna, Neelam Kothari, Raveena Tandon and Anupam Kher. It marked the Bollywood debuts for both Saif and Ramya.

Parampara was released worldwide on 14 May 1993.

== Plot ==
The wealthy Thakur Bhavani Singh lives in a remote region of India where he shares an intense rivalry with a local gypsy clan led by Gora Shankar. Parampara (tradition) dictates that differences are resolved with a single bullet pistol duel at the top of a hill. Years earlier, Bhavani Singh fought a duel against Gora Shankar's father and killed him.

Bhavani's son Prithvi returns from London and, while on an excursion to the nearby woods with friends, hears the distant singing voice of Gora Shankar as he is arbitrarily serenading his wife with a short song. Prithvi alive immediately demands friendship with Gora Shankar and makes arrangements to do so. He strikes up a friendship with Shankar and his clanmates, much to the dismay of his father. As Prithvi gets closer he falls in love with Shankar's sister Tara. His father, however, has arranged Prithvi's marriage with the daughter of a fellow upper-class acquaintance. Prithvi is unable to make up his mind and ends up defiantly marrying Tara against his father's wishes - and subsequently marrying the girl of his father's choosing, Rajeshwari.

Later, Bhavani Singh discovers Tara has given birth to Prithvi's son and to his fury, orders his men to attack the gypsy colony and to kill Tara, her son and anyone who comes in the way. The Thakur's men set the camps ablaze, killing Tara but not her son, Ranvir. Shankar, who also survived the attack storms in to kill Bhavani Singh in revenge but he is arrested and imprisoned. Prithvi tells his father that he will never acknowledge his presence again and despite living in the same house, his father will never hear his voice. Rajeshwari then presents him with the rescued Ranvir, earning the respect and love of her husband. Rajeshwari gives birth to a son, Pratap, whom Bhavani Singh recognises as his true grandson. Both Ranvir and Pratap are brought up in the same household by Prithvi and Rajeshwari but both boys eventually realise that there is a difference between the two.

Gora Shankar is released from prison and returns to challenge Bhavani Singh to a pistol duel, but before the old man can respond, Prithvi intervenes and says the duel should be fought among equals and that Shankar should be duelling him, not his father. Shankar, who still sees Prithvi as his friend, reluctantly accepts and the duel is set for the next day.

Prithvi silently takes his father's blessing and heads to the hill alone. At the duel, both Shankar and Prithvi take their pistols and begin to pace away from each other. As the shot to turn and fire is heard, both men turn and aim - but only Shankar fires, shooting Prithvi in the chest. He runs immediately to Prithvi who reveals he never loaded his gun. As Prithvi dies, he tells Shankar to take Ranvir far away from his father, hoping no more blood will be shed in petty rivalry. At Prithvi's funeral, both Bhavani Singh and Gora Shankar draw their swords and challenge each other but are stopped by Rajeshwari. Shankar takes Ranvir and leaves the region for good.

Years later, both of Prithvi's sons meet in college as strangers, not knowing the identity of the other. Firstly rivals, the two become close friends but after Pratap recognises Gora Shankar at Ranvir's house, the two quickly realise that their past is linked but after years of being influenced by their respective guardians, they share a hatred of one another's families. Ranvir blames Bhavani Singh for killing his mother, while Pratap blames Shankar for killing his father.

Despite the efforts of Shankar and Rajeshwari to end the fighting which will only lead to tragedy, Ranvir ends up challenging his grandfather Bhavani Singh to a duel. Pratap, echoing the words of his father years ago, states that the duel should be fought among equals and with that the challenge is set.

The next day Pratap arrives with Rajeshwari and Ranvir with Shankar. Just as the battle is about to start, Bhavani shows up on his horse to watch from a distance. The two brothers turn their backs on each other and start to pace away. As they do this their grandfather watches them and begins to see visions of his son Prithvi as he looks at both Ranvir and Pratap. The signal to turn and shoot is given and both men turn and fire instinctively - only to see their grandfather between them having taken both their bullets. As Bhavani stumbles to the ground, he cries out for Prithvi, revealing the years of torment of losing his son. The brothers rush to the fallen old man, who, in his last moments, tells them of his regret and hope that with his death there is no further bloodshed.

After the funeral, Ranvir and Pratap are about to head their separate ways but stop to embrace each other as brothers for the first time.

== Cast ==
- Sunil Dutt as Thakur Bhavani Singh
- Vinod Khanna as Prithvi Singh
- Aamir Khan as Ranvir Prithvi Singh
- Saif Ali Khan as Pratap Singh
- Neelam Kothari as Sapna
- Raveena Tandon as Vijaya
- Ashwini Bhave as Rajeshwari Singh
- Ramya Krishna as Tara Shankar
- Anupam Kher as Gora Shankar
- Aloka Mukherjee as Phulmati Shankar
- Vikas Anand as a Qawaal singer
- Mukesh Rishi as Thakur Bhavani Singh's man

== Soundtrack ==
The music is composed by Shiv-Hari.

#	Title	Singer(s)	Note
1	"Aadhi Raat Ko"	Lata Mangeshkar, Amit Kumar, Chorus	
2	"Hum Banjaare Dil Nahin Dete"	Lata Mangeshkar, Devaki Pandit, Chorus	
3	"Tu Saawan Main Pyaas Piya"	Lata Mangeshkar	
4	"Phoolon Ke Iss Shehar Mein"	Lata Mangeshkar, Abhijeet Bhattacharya, Chorus	
5	"Mere Saathiya"	Lata Mangeshkar, Abhijeet Bhattacharya	
6	"Nawjawaanon Ka Zamaana Hain"	Kavita Krishnamurthy, Anupama Deshpande, Vinod Rathod, Samir Date, Chorus	
7	"Maangti Hain Pyaasi Dharti"	Chorus	
8	"Mujhe Ishq Ho Gaya"	Aslam Sabri and Party	
9	"Tu Saawan Main Pyaas Piya (Sad)"	Lata Mangeshkar	Soundtrack only, not included in the movie.
10	"Hum Banjaare Dil Nahin Dete (Sad)"	Lata Mangeshkar	Picturized on Tara's death. Not included in the soundtrack.
11	"Iss Paar Se Do Aawaaz Zara"	Hariharan (singer)	Picturized on Phulmati and Shankar. Not included in the soundtrack.
12	"Mere Saathiya (Solo)"	Abhijeet Bhattacharya	Picturized on Sapna's and Ranbir's reunion. Not included in the soundtrack.
13	"Dance Music"	Instrumental	Picturized on Tara. Not included in the soundtrack.
