= Ravi Chopra =

Indian filmmaker (1946–2014)

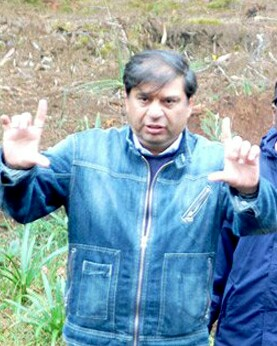
- Born: 27 September 1946; Lahore, Punjab, British India
- Died: 12 November 2014 (aged 68); Mumbai, Maharashtra, India
- Education: St. Xavier's College, Mumbai (BA)
- Occupations: Director; producer
- Years active: 1969–2009
- Spouse: Renu Chopra (m. 1975)
- Children: 2
- Father: B.R. Chopra
- Family: Chopra family

Ravi Chopra (27 September 1946 – 12 November 2014) was an Indian filmmaker, best known for directing the television show Mahabharat (1988–1990).

== Life ==
Chopra was the son of producer and director B.R. Chopra and nephew of Yash Chopra. Aditya Chopra and Uday Chopra are his cousins.

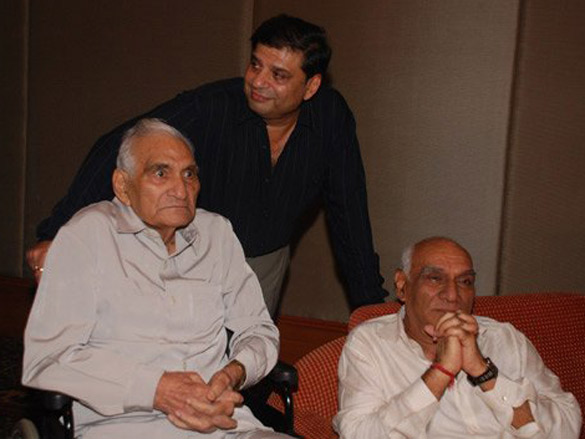
Ravi with his father B.R. Chopra (left) and uncle Yash Chopra in 2008 on the re-release of 1957 film Naya Daur in Mumbai

He was married to Renu since 1975, they have two children together.

On 23 October 2012, he was diagnosed with a severe lung ailment and was discharged from Breach Candy Hospital after a week. "He was discharged from hospital on October 26," hospital sources said, without going into details. He was being treated for lung cancer at CMC Vellore. Chopra died on 12 November 2014 at Breach Candy Hospital in Mumbai where he had been admitted a few days earlier for a lung ailment. He was 68 years old, and survived by his wife and two children.

== Career ==
=== Film career ===
Chopra started his career assisting his father B.R. Chopra in films like, Dastaan (1972) and Dhund (1973). He also assisted his uncle Yash Chopra in Ittefaq (1969). Eventually, he made his independent directorial debut with Zameer (1975), produced under the family banner, B. R. Films.

In 1980, he directed the ensemble disaster film The Burning Train, which over the years is considered a cult classic. Other films he directed included Mazdoor (1983), Aaj Ki Awaaz, Dehleez (1986), Pratigyabadh and Kal Ki Awaz (1992).

During 1988-89 along with his father, he directed the TV series Mahabharat. After his father's death the only movie Ravi produced was Bhoothnath (2008).

=== Television career ===
Ravi directed the highly successful television serial Mahabharat, which aired during 1988–1990, and the television mini-series, Ramayan, which was aired in 2002. He also directed mythological shows like Vishnu Puran and Ma Shakti. His TV series Aap Beeti was one of the most popular TV show on Doordarshan National in the early 2000s.

== Plagiarism charge ==
Chopra was served with a legal notice in 2009 by 20th Century Fox, which charged that Banda Yeh Bindaas Hai blatantly plagiarised their 1992 film My Cousin Vinny. Chopra and the production company, BR Films, denied the charges in court in May 2009. The film's release was to be delayed until June 2009 by order of the Bombay High Court.

A lawsuit was filed against BR Films by 20th Century Fox for copying their film without buying the rights. Fox sought damages of $1.4 million; they had given Chopra permission "to make a film loosely based on the Academy Award winning movie" but concluded the final product was a "substantial reproduction" of the original. Fox eventually accepted a $200,000 settlement from the film's producer. Although since the death of Ravi Chopra in 2014, it has not seen a theatrical release.

The Telegraph, listing a number of other Bollywood movies "inspired" by Hollywood blockbusters, noted that the case would "decide whether Indian filmmakers can continue to get their 'inspiration' with impunity, or buy rights the legal way."

== Filmography ==
=== Films ===
Year	Title	Director	Producer	Writer	Notes
1969	Ittefaq	No	No	No	Assistant director
1972	Dastaan	No	No	No	Assistant director
1973	Dhund	Associate	No	No	
1975	Zameer	Yes	No	No	
1978	Tumhari Kasam	Yes	No	No	
1980	The Burning Train	Yes	No	Yes	
1980	Insaf Ka Tarazu	No	Associate	No	
1981	Agni Pareeksha	No	Associate	No	
1982	Nikaah	No	Associate	No	
1982	Teri Meri Kahani	No	Associate	No	Television film
1983	Dharti Aakash	No	Associate	No	Television film
1983	Mazdoor	Yes	No	No	
1984	Aaj Ki Awaaz	Yes	Associate	No	
1986	Dahleez	Yes	Associate	No	
1987	Awam	No	Associate	No	
1991	Pratigyabadh	Yes	No	No	
1992	Kal Ki Awaz	Yes	Yes	No	Co-directed with B.R. Chopra
1999	Eastside	No	Yes	Yes	
2003	Baghban	Yes	No	No	
2004	Karma	No	Yes	No	Short film
2006	Baabul	Yes	No	Yes	
2008	Heaven on Earth	No	Executive	No	
2008	Bhoothnath	No	Yes	No	
2009	Cooking with Stella	No	Executive	No	
TBA	Banda Yeh Bindaas Hai	Yes	Yes	No	Unreleased

=== Television ===
Year	Title	Director	Producer
1986	Bahadur Shah Zafar	Yes	Yes
1987	Chunni	Yes	No
1988–1990	Mahabharat	Yes	No
1993–1996	Kanoon	Yes	No
1995	Ek Se Badhkar Ek	Yes	No
1995–1996	Jhansi Ki Rani	Yes	No
1997	Aurat	Yes	Yes
1997–1998	Mahabharat Katha	Yes	Yes
2000–2002	Vishnu Puran	Yes	No
2001	Aap Beeti	Yes	Yes
2001–2002	Ramayan	Yes	Yes
2002–2003	Maa Shakti	Yes	Yes
2004–2005	Kamini Damini	Yes	Yes
2008	Sujata	No	Yes

== Awards ==
In 1985, Chopra was nominated for Best Director at the 32nd Filmfare Awards for his film Aaj Ki Awaaz (1984).

In 2004, he was nominated at the IIFA Awards and Screen Awards for Best Director for his film Baghban (2003).
