= Joroo Ka Ghulam =

1972 Indian comedy film

- Directed by: A. Bhimsingh
- Starring: Rajesh Khanna; Nanda; Om Prakash
- Cinematography: K. Balakrishna
- Edited by: A. Paul Dorai Singham
- Music by: Songs: Kalyanji–Anandji; Background Score: Minoo Katkar
- Release date: 15 September 1972
- Country: India
- Language: Hindi

Joroo Ka Ghulam (Wife's Slave) is a 1972 Hindi-language comedy film. Directed by A. Bhimsingh, it stars Rajesh Khanna, Nanda, Om Prakash, Ramesh Deo and Jayshree T. The music is by Kalyanji Anandji. The movie was remade in Kannada as Anukoolakkobba Ganda. The duo of Nanda and Khanna had worked in the thriller The Train and the suspense drama Ittefaq (1969). This was the pair's third film and it was hit at the box office.

== Plot ==
Kalpana is the daughter of a rich man who always worries that his daughter might fall in love. Hence, he always forbids her to talk with men. But Kalpana does not care. She leaves for her uncle's house to continue her studies. In the city, Kalpana visits an art gallery and gets attracted by a painting of an artist named Rajesh. She gets angry when a photographer tries to get a sketch of her without her consent. Meanwhile, an aspiring artist is working on an assignment for an ad for the company where Kalpana's uncle works. Due to the deadline pressure, he sketches Kalpana for the ad without her knowledge as he was not satisfied with the models he saw. The next day Kalpana's picture gets published in newspaper and Kalpana gets angry about that. She finds that the sketch was done by the artist Rajesh and her anger goes away. Both of them become good friends and then eventually fall in love. Kalpana's father learns of this and he lies to her that Kalpana's mother is ill. Kalpana rushes to her home, only to find it was her father's lie as he does not want his daughter to be away anymore. He arranges for Kalpana's marriage with a son of rich man who looks like an elephant. Kalpana runs away to Rajesh and insists that he marry her. Rajesh initially refuses as his financial background is not stable, but finally agrees under Kalpana's compulsion. Both marry and settle with their lives.

Rajesh tells Kalpana that they should go to Kalpana's father and apologize for whatever happened, much against liking of Kalpana. Unwillingly, she goes to her father. She tells him to wait outside and she alone goes inside her home. Kalpana's father insults Rajesh and says that he is looking only for the money and property of Kalpana. She gets angry and leaves the place along with Rajesh. But Kalpana stays in touch with her mother through letters. She writes to her mother that Rajesh is now rich and bought a bungalow, car etc. so as to irritate her father. Kalpana and Rajesh are blessed with a boy and Kalpana's father changes his mind to see his grandson. He informs Kalpana about their arrival for the naming ceremony of the child. Now Kalpana is in trouble as she has lied to her parents about Rajesh's wealth and growth, of which even Rajesh is unaware.

She hires a bungalow and car for two days until the departure of her parents. Rajesh tries to dissuade her from lying and when she refuses to listen to him, he angrily tells her that she should hire a husband too, if she could hire a house and car and leaves. So Kalpana asks her friend's brother to feign to be her husband for two days and he hesitantly agrees. Kaplana's parents buy everything, though they feel things are chaotic. They attribute it to the inexperience of their daughter and lack of domestic help. On the other side, Rajesh feels quite ashamed of abandoning his wife and returns. When he learns of the arrangements, he settles there as domestic help.

Now, the comedy of errors revolves around the bungalow for the next two days with Kalpana, Rajesh and Kalpana's fake husband, who is about to marry Kalpana's other friend within two days. Things go normally till two days later, when Kalpana's parents announce that they want to continue the stay to spend more time with their grandchild and make him their heir. Their landlord, and people who gave the car and furniture on rent come to retrieve them. Moreover, Kalpana's cousin who expected that he would inherit property becomes bitter and kidnaps the child. After Rajesh saves his child and his father-in-law's money, the drama is unveiled. Finally Kalpana's parents buy a house, a car and furniture and ask forgiveness for not understanding Rajesh's character before, and the situation improves.

== Cast ==
- Rajesh Khanna as Rajesh / Neelkanth / Mundu
- Nanda as Kalpana
- Om Prakash as Shyamlal, Kalpana's father
- Achala Sachdev as Saraswati, Kalpana's mother
- Ramesh Deo as Ramesh, Shyamlal's nephew
- Nana Palsikar as Nandlal, Dipu's father
- Manmohan Krishna as Mohanlal, Tina's father
- Poonam Sinha as Tina, Kalpana's friend
- Sharad Kumar as Deepu, Tina's fiancé
- Iftekhar as Kalpana's uncle

== Soundtrack ==
#	Title	Singer(s)
1	"Aaiye Aap Ko Main"	Kishore Kumar
2	"Nainon Mein Nindiya Hai"	Kishore Kumar, Lata Mangeshkar
3	"Baras Gayi Re"	Kishore Kumar
4	"Hum Do Mohabbat Ke Maare"	Kishore Kumar, Asha Bhosle
5	"Jaam Par Jaam Peene Se"	Lata Mangeshkar
