= Nanda (actress) =

Indian actress (1939–2014)

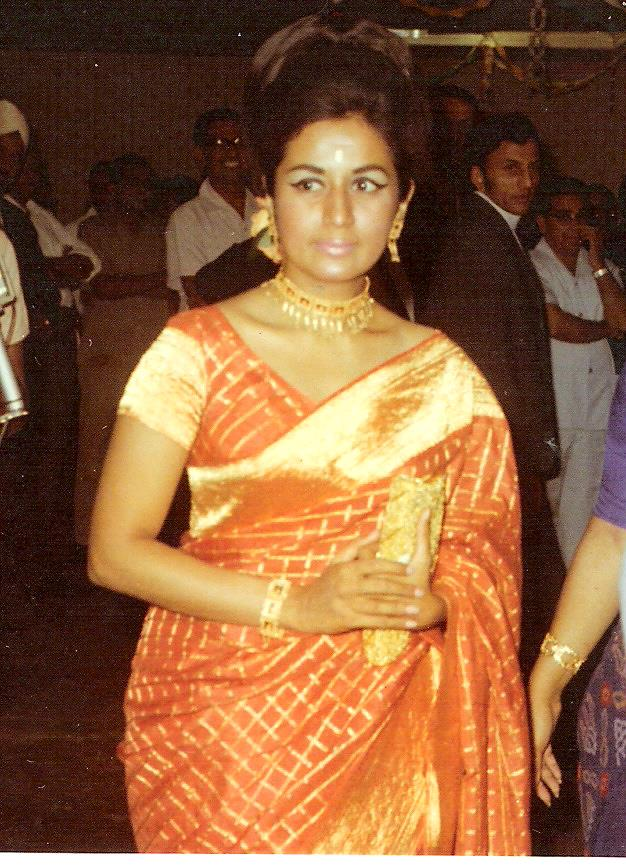
- Nanda at a party in Kenya, 1970
- Born: Nandini Karnataki; 8 January 1939; Kolhapur, Kolhapur State, India (now in Maharashtra, India)
- Died: 25 March 2014 (aged 75); Mumbai, Maharashtra, India
- Occupation: Actress
- Years active: 1948–1983
- Father: Master Vinayak
- Relatives: V. Shantaram (maternal cousin); Bhalji Pendharkar Baburao Pendharkar (half-brothers)
- Awards: Filmfare Best Supporting Actress Award for Aanchal (1960)

Nandini Karnataki (8 January 1939 – 25 March 2014), known mononymously as Nanda, was an Indian actress who appeared in Hindi and Marathi films. Starting out as a child actor, and later doing supporting roles, Nanda established herself as one of the highest-paid actresses of the 1960s and early 1970s. In a career spanning more than 30 years, she portrayed a range of characters and is the recipient of a Filmfare Award.

She is best known for her performances in Chhoti Bahen, Dhool Ka Phool, Bhabhi, Kala Bazar, Kanoon, Hum Dono, Jab Jab Phool Khile, Gumnaam, Ittefaq, The Train and Prem Rog.

== Early life ==
Nanda was born in a Maharashtrian show-business family to Vinayak Damodar Karnataki (Master Vinayak), a successful Marathi actor-producer-director. Master Vinayak was related to many personalities in the Indian film industry. His brother Vasudev Karnataki was a cinematographer while noted film personalities Baburao Pendharkar (1896–1967) and Bhalji Pendharkar (1897–1994) were his half-brothers. He was also a maternal cousin of legendary film director V. Shantaram. Master Vinayak was a good friend of the Mangeshkar family and introduced Lata Mangeshkar to the film industry in his movie Pahilee Mangalagaur.

Her father died in 1947, aged 41 when Nanda was seven years old. The family faced hard times. She became a child actress, helping her family by working in films in the early 1950s. As a result of her involvement in movies, her studies suffered, and she was coached at home by renowned school teacher and Bombay Scouts commissioner, Gokuldas V. Makhi. By taking up a career in films, she supported and educated her six siblings. One of her brothers is Marathi film director Jaiprakash Karnataki who is married to actress Jayshree T.

== Career ==
=== Child actress and supporting roles ===
Nanda made her debut with Mandir in 1948. On the silver screen, she was first recognised as "Baby Nanda". In films like Mandir, Jaggu and Angaarey, She was a child actor from 1948 to 1956. Nanda's paternal uncle, the renowned film producer-director V. Shantaram gave Nanda a big break by casting her in a successful brother-sister saga; Toofan Aur Diya (1956). It was the saga of an orphaned brother and sister that are buffeted by a series of tragic setbacks, including the girl losing her sight. She received her first nomination for the Filmfare Award for Best Supporting Actress for Bhabhi (1957), she claimed that the reason she did not win was that there was lobbying involved. She played supporting roles to stars such as Dev Anand in Kala Bazar (1960), and played the second lead in Dhool Ka Phool (1959). Earlier in her career, she acted in many Marathi films. These include Kuldaivat, Shevgyachyaa Shenga directed by Shantaram Athavale, Deoghar directed by Raja Paranjpe, Zalegele Visrun Jaa directed by Yashwant Patekar, and Aai wina baal with Hansa Wadkar. Nanda was honoured by Prime Minister Jawaharlal Nehru for her sister's role in Shevgyachyaa shenga.

=== Leading lady ===
She played the title role in L.V. Prasad's Chhoti Bahen (1959). The film was a big hit, making her a star. In this commercially successful 1959 film, Nanda played the blind younger sister looked after by two elder brothers, played by Balraj Sahni and Rehman. She then played lead roles, such as one of Dev Anand's heroines in Hum Dono (1961) and Teen Deviyan. Both films were acclaimed as hits. She was the heroine in B.R. Chopra's Kanoon (1960), a film with no songs, which was then rare.

She won the Filmfare Award for Best Supporting Actress for Aanchal (1960), her first and only win at the Filmfare Awards. She was paired with Raj Kapoor in Aashiq (1962) and she worked with Rajendra Kumar in three films – Toofan Aur Diya (1956), Dhool Ka Phool (1961) and Kanoon (1960). She had quoted in one of her interviews: "Many of my great performances were in films that failed or did average business, like Usne Kaha Tha, Char Diwari, Nartaki, and Aaj Aur Kal."

Nanda was known to encourage newcomers. She signed eight films with Shashi Kapoor at a time when he was yet to become successful in Hindi Cinema. Their first two films as a pair – the critically acclaimed romantic film Char Diwari (1961) and Mehndi Lagi Mere Haath (1962) – did not work, but the rest were successful at the box office. Shashi, though he had achieved success in English films in 1963 and in two Hindi films in 1965, had five flops as solo lead hero from his debut in 1961 till 1965 in Hindi films. In Jab Jab Phool Khile (1965), Nanda played a westernised role for the first time and it helped her image. Her favourite song that was famously picturised on her in the film was "Yeh samaa." Shashi would later declare that Nanda was his favourite heroine. Nanda, too, declared Kapoor as her favourite hero. In the period 1965 to 1970, the successful films of the pair Shashi-Nanda include Mohabbat Isko Kahete Hain (1965), Jab Jab Phool Khile (1965), Neend Hamari Khwab Tumhare (1966), Raja Saab (1969) and Rootha Na Karo (1970). In the early 1970s, Nanda suggested Rajendra Kumar, co-producer of The Train, to take Rajesh Khanna as the main lead.

She had another hit film in 1965 with Gumnaam, which helped put her in the top league of heroines. With Dharmendra, she worked in Mera Kasoor Kya Hai and Akashdeep. She played lead heroine roles beginning with Choti Bahen and Kanoon from 1959 to 60 and continued to get roles as the main female lead till 1973. She signed with new leading man Rajesh Khanna in the songless suspense thriller Ittefaq (1969), for which she received her first and only nomination for the Filmfare Award for Best Actress and also proved to be successful at the box office. After Khanna became a superstar, he signed two more films with her; the thriller The Train (1970) and the comedy Joroo Ka Ghulam (1972) which became hits. Jeetendra, too, had some hit films with her such as Parivar and Dharti Kahe Pukar Ke, with Sanjay Khan, she had a hit in Beti and Abhilasha The three films Ittefaq, The Train and Joru Ka Ghulam – earned more than her earlier hits opposite Shashi Kapoor, Rajendra Kumar, Dev Anand, Sanjeev Kumar and Jeetendra.

=== Later career and supporting roles ===
After a small role in Manoj Kumar's Shor (1972), Nanda did a few more critically acclaimed films such as Chhalia (1973) and Naya Nasha (1974), which flopped. Work offers for Nanda dried up from 1973 as her pairing with other younger actors such as Navin Nischol, Vinod Mehra, Deb Mukherjee and Parikshit Sahni did not work., and she then stopped acting. In the early 1980's, she had a career comeback with three successful films, all coincidentally having her play Padmini Kolhapure's mother in Ahista Ahista (1981), Raj Kapoor's Prem Rog (1982), and Mazdoor (1983), receiving two nominations for the Filmfare Award for Best Supporting Actress for the first two films, after which she permanently retired.

=== Earnings and ranking ===
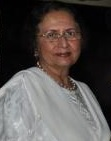
Nanda in 2010

Nanda, who has done some notable work in Bollywood films such as Dhool Ka Phool, Dulhan, Bhabhi, Jab Jab Phool Khile, Gumnaam, Shor, Parineeta, and Prem Rog and was one of the highest-paid actresses of her time. She was the second highest-paid Hindi actress, along with Nutan from 1960 to 1965, the second highest-paid Hindi actress from 1966 to 1969 along with Nutan and Waheeda Rehman, and the third highest-paid Hindi actress with Sadhana from 1970 to 1973.

== Personal life ==
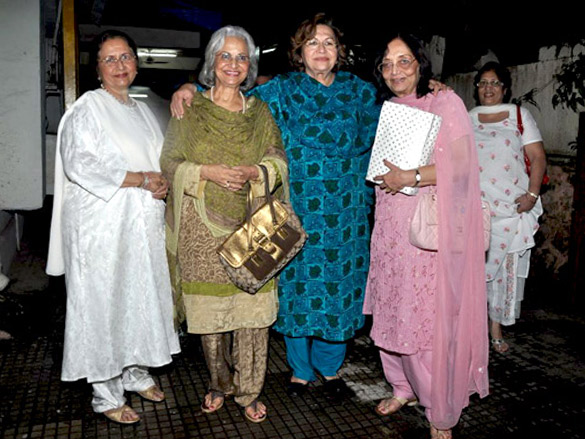
Nanda (first from left) with Waheeda Rehman, Helen, and Sadhana, in 2010

In 1965, while filming in Kashmir for Jab Jab Phool Khile, director Suraj Prakash recalled that a Maharashtrian lieutenant colonel had been smitten by Nanda and had asked him to forward his marriage proposal to her mother. In the end, nothing came of it. Nanda's brothers brought home many suitors for her, but she turned them all down.

In 1992, a middle-aged Nanda became engaged to director Manmohan Desai at the urging of Waheeda Rehman. But soon he died after falling from the terrace of his rented flat in Girgaon, just a year after her mother died of cancer. According to reports, the railing he was leaning on collapsed. Nanda remained unmarried.

Nanda lived in her residence in Mumbai, interacting only with family and very close friends. Her close friends from the film industry included Waheeda Rehman, Nargis, Asha Parekh, Helen, Saira Banu, Mala Sinha, Sadhana, Shakila and Jabeen Jaleel. After a long hiatus, she made a public appearance with Rehman for a screening of the Marathi film Natarang (2010).

== Death ==
She died in Mumbai on 25 March 2014 at her Versova residence, aged 75, following a heart attack.

== Selected filmography ==
Films as actor
| Year | Film | Role(s) | Notes |
|---|---|---|---|
| 1952 | Jaggu | | Child artist |
| 1954 | Angaray | young Tulsi | |
| 1956 | Toofan Aur Deeya | Nandini | |
| 1956 | Devghar (Marathi) | | |
| 1956 | Satranj | | |
| 1957 | Bandi | Asha Mishra | |
| 1957 | Bhabhi | Lata | |
| 1957 | Agra Road | Seema | |
| 1957 | Laxmi | | |
| 1957 | Sakshi Gopal | | |
| 1958 | Dulhan | Sadhana | |
| 1959 | Barkha | Parvati | |
| 1959 | Zara Bachke | | |
| 1959 | Qaidi No. 911 | Geeta | |
| 1959 | Chhoti Bahen | Meena | |
| 1959 | Dhool Ka Phool | Malati | |
| 1959 | Naya Sansar | | |
| 1959 | Pehli Raat | | |
| 1960 | Aanchal | Chanda | |
| 1960 | Apna Ghar | | |
| 1960 | Chand Mere Aja | Radha | |
| 1960 | Jo Huwa So Bhool Jao | | |
| 1960 | Kala Bazar | Sapna | |
| 1960 | Kanoon | Meena Prasad | |
| 1960 | Usne Kaha Tha | Kamli | |
| 1961 | Amar Rahe Yeh Pyar | Razia Hussain | |
| 1961 | Char Diwari | Lakshmi | |
| 1961 | Hum Dono | Ruma | |
| 1962 | Aashiq | Renu | |
| 1962 | Mehndi Lagi Mere Haath | Rajani | |
| 1963 | Nartakee | Lakshmi | |
| 1963 | Aaj Aur Kal | Hemlata (Hema) | |
| 1964 | Kaise Kahoon | Rekha | |
| 1964 | Mera Qasoor Kya Hai | Nirmala | |
| 1965 | Akashdeep | Ruma | |
| 1965 | Bedaag | Manju | |
| 1965 | Jab Jab Phool Khile | Reeta Khanna | |
| 1965 | Mohabbat Isko Kehte Hain | Rajani | |
| 1965 | Teen Devian | Nanda | |
| 1965 | Gumnaam | Asha | |
| 1966 | Neend Hamari Khwab Tumhare | Nishad | |
| 1966 | Pati Patni | Gauri | |
| 1967 | Parivar | Meena | |
| 1968 | Abhilasha | Ritu | |
| 1968 | Juaari | Saroj | |
| 1969 | Beti | Sudha Verma | |
| 1969 | Dharti Kahe Pukarke | Radha | |
| 1969 | Raja Saab | Poonam | |
| 1969 | Ittefaq | Rekha | |
| 1969 | Badi Didi | Bhavna | |
| 1970 | Rootha Na Karo | Neeta | |
| 1970 | The Train | Neeta/Geeta/Kalavati/Priya | |
| 1971 | Woh Din Yaad Karo | Tara | |
| 1971 | Adhikar | Meera | |
| 1971 | Umeed | | Delayed |
| 1972 | Shor | Geeta | Special Appearance |
| 1972 | Parineeta | | |
| 1972 | Joroo Ka Ghulam | Kalpana | |
| 1973 | Chhalia | Suneeta / Neeta | |
| 1973 | Naya Nasha | Reena | |
| 1974 | Jurm Aur Sazaa | Ricky | |
| 1974 | Asliyat | | |
| 1977 | Prayashchit | Rita/ Ramma | |
| 1980 | Qatil Kaun | | |
| 1981 | Ahista Ahista | Sangeeta | |
| 1982 | Prem Rog | Virendra's wife | |
| 1983 | Mazdoor | Radha | |

== Awards and nominations ==
| Year | Award | Category | Work | Result |
|---|---|---|---|---|
| 1958 | Filmfare Awards | Best Supporting Actress | Bhabhi | Nominated |
| 1961 | Filmfare Awards | Best Supporting Actress | Aanchal | Won |
| 1970 | Filmfare Awards | Best Actress | Ittefaq | Nominated |
| 1982 | Filmfare Awards | Best Supporting Actress | Ahista Ahista | Nominated |
| 1983 | Filmfare Awards | Best Supporting Actress | Prem Rog | Nominated |
