= Aadmi Aur Insaan =

1969 Indian Hindi film directed by Yash Chopra

- Poster
- Directed by: Yash Chopra
- Written by: Akhtar-Ul-Iman
- Produced by: B. R. Chopra
- Starring: Dharmendra; Saira Banu; Feroz Khan; Mumtaz
- Music by: Ravi
- Release date: 8 August 1969
- Country: India
- Language: Hindi

Aadmi Aur Insaan is a 1969 Hindi film produced by B. R. Chopra and directed by Yash Chopra. The film stars Dharmendra, Saira Banu, Feroz Khan, Mumtaz, Johnny Walker, Madan Puri, Ajit, Anwar, Iftekhar, Achla Sachdev, Kamini Kaushal and Nazima. The film's music is by Ravi with lyrics by Sahir Ludhiyanvi.

== Plot ==
A wealthy and independent industrialist, Jai Kishan befriends a young man from a middle-class background by the name of Munish Mehra, assists him financially to go abroad and get necessary qualifications as an engineer, and then hires him on one of his construction projects. Meena Khanna is the daughter of a government official. Munish and Meena meet and fall in love with each other. Jai also gets attracted towards Meena. Shortly after this, Jai finds out that Munish is in love with Meena, and gets enraged. He subsequently fires Munish, and ensures that he will not get hired anywhere else. After several vain attempts to obtain employment, Munish gets hired by the government, and is assigned to investigate the collapse of a railway bridge. Munish finds out that Jai was directly responsible for this mishap as he used sub-standard materials. Munish now has the tools to take revenge from Jai and destroy him, and accordingly informs his employer. But when the time comes for Munish to make a full report, he declines, and the government has no alternative but to prosecute him in a court of law for taking bribes and destroying his report. And the main witness appearing against him is none other than Jai. How Munish fights injustice and clears his name forms the rest of the story.

== Cast ==
- Dharmendra as Munish Mehra
- Saira Banu as Meena Khanna
- Feroz Khan as Jai Kishan / J.K.
- Mumtaz as Rita
- Johnny Walker as Gulam Rasool
- Poonam Sinha (Komal) as Renu Mehra
- Ajit as Kundanlal / Sher Singh
- Randhawa as Shanker
- Uma Dutt as Sher Singh
- Anwar Hussain as Gupta
- Iftekhar as Saxena
- Gajanan Jagirdar as Judge
- Kamini Kaushal as Mrs. Khanna (Meena's mom)
- Manmohan Krishna as Mr. Khanna (Meena's father)
- Roopesh Kumar as Abdul Rashid / Rashu
- Nana Palsikar as Justice B.N. Desai
- Madan Puri as Sabharwal
- Jagdish Raj as Balwa (drunkard)
- Achala Sachdev as Mrs. Mehra (Munish's mom)
- Surekha
- Ram Avtar as Sweets Seller (uncredited)
- Keshav Rana as Rana (uncredited)
- Ravikant as Mirza (uncredited)

== Soundtrack ==
Music: Ravi, Lyrics: Sahir Ludhiyanvi.

#	Title	Singer(s)
1	"Neele Parbaton Ki Dhara"	Mahendra Kapoor, Asha Bhosle
2	"Bacha Le Ae Maula Ae Ram"	Mohammed Rafi
3	"Ijaazat Ho"	Mahendra Kapoor, Asha Bhosle
4	"Itni Jaldi Na Karo"	Asha Bhosle
5	"Jaage Ga Insaan Zaman Dekhega"	Mahendra Kapoor
6	"O Yara Dildara"	Mahendra Kapoor, Balbir, Joginder
7	"Zindagi Ittefaq Hai (Duet)"	Mahendra Kapoor, Asha Bhosle
8	"Zindagi Ittefaq Hai (Solo)"	Asha Bhosle
9	"Zindagi Ke Rang Kai Re Saathi"	Asha Bhosle

Two songs are set in Hindustani ragas: "Neele Parbaton Ki Dhara" (Pahadi) and "O Yara Dildara" (Pahadi).

== Awards ==
- 1970 Filmfare Best Supporting Actor Award for Feroz Khan

Nominated

- 1971 Filmfare Best Supporting Actress Award for Mumtaz
