= Dulhan (1958 film) =

- Directed by: V. M. Vyas
- Written by: Vahid Kureshi
- Produced by: A. A. Nadiadwala
- Starring: Nirupa Roy; Raaj Kumar; Nanda
- Cinematography: P. Issac
- Music by: Ravi
- Production company: Pushpa Pictures
- Distributed by: Pushpa Pictures
- Release date: 1958
- Country: India
- Language: Hindi

Dulhan is a 1958 Hindi-language film.

== Cast ==
- Raaj Kumar as Mohan
- Nirupa Roy as Sharda
- Nanda as Sadhana
- Jeevan as Anokhelal
- Agha as Masterji
- Bhagwan Dada as Professor Bhaskande
- Gajanan Jagirdar as Seth Dhanpal
- Manorama as Chanda

== Soundtrack ==
Song	Singer
"Mere Gore Gore Gaal, Mere Kale Kale Baal"	Shamshad Begum, Mohammed Rafi
"Kaise Jaaun Mai Piya, Mora Maane Na Jiya"	Asha Bhosle, Hemant Kumar
"Lelo Lelo Muliram Aur Bhindimal Ka"	Mohammed Rafi
"I Love You O Madam"	Asha Bhosle, Geeta Dutt
"Jiya Sharmaye Nazar Jhuki Jaaye"	Asha Bhosle
"Naari Jeevan, Gehra Sagar, Dono Ek Saman"	Asha Bhosle
"Aaj Chita Par Leti Ek Bharat Maa Ki Beti"	Hemant Kumar
"Dil Na Jala Gham Ko Bhula Ja"	Asha Bhosle
"To Phir Tumko"	Asha Bhosle, Geeta Dutt
