= Kamini Damini =

Indian television drama series

- Genre: Drama
- Written by: Pravin Solanki; Harsha Jagdish; Hasan Kamal
- Directed by: Vishal Desai; Yatin Dang; Harish Razdan
- Creative director: Anjana Sood
- Starring: See below
- Theme music composer: Lalit Sen
- Opening theme: "Kamini Damini" by Priya Bhattacharya
- Country of origin: India
- Original language: Hindi
- No. of seasons: 1

Production
- Producers: B.R. Chopra; Ravi Chopra; Tripti Sharma
- Cinematography: Vasant Jadhav
- Editor: Godfrey Gonsalves
- Camera setup: Multi-camera
- Running time: Approx. 24 minutes
- Production company: BR Films

Original release
- Network: Sahara One
- Release: 27 December 2004 – 2005

Kamini Damini is an Indian television drama series which premiered on 27 December 2004 on Sahara One. The show replaced Malini Iyer. The show ended in 2005.

== Plot ==
The story revolves around the life of two twin sisters, Kamini and Damini, who get separated in their youth but later reunite several years later. Damini then replaces her sister to solve her problems and protect her from family members who torture her.

== Cast ==
- Hema Malini as
  - Kamini
  - Damini
- Pankaj Dheer as Damini's Husband
- Anang Desai
- Shashi Sharma
- Dharmesh Tiwari
- Rajesh Puri
- Sudesh Berry as Saurabh Verma
- Nasirr Khan
- Hrishikesh Pandey as Vijay, Damini's son
- Mazher Sayed as Damini's son
- Vishal Watwani as Damini's son
- Ekta Sharma as Damini's Daughter-in-law
- Chitrapama Banerjee as Damini's Daughter-in-law
