= Kal Ki Awaz =

1992 Indian Hindi film by Ravi Chopra

- Directed by: Ravi Chopra
- Screenplay by: Kulwant Jani; Satish Bhatnagar
- Dialogues by: Rahi Masoom Raza
- Story by: Rahi Masoom Raza
- Produced by: B. R. Chopra; Ravi Chopra
- Starring: Dharmendra; Raj Babbar; Amrita Singh; Rohit Bhatia; Pratibha Sinha
- Music by: Nadeem-Shravan
- Release date: 21 August 1992
- Country: India
- Language: Hindi

Kal Ki Awaz is a 1992 Indian Hindi-language drama film starring Dharmendra, Raj Babbar, Amrita Singh, Pratibha Sinha and Rohit Bhatia in the lead roles. It was produced and directed by the father-son duo of Baldev Raj Chopra and Ravi Chopra.

== Plot ==
After the retirement of Police Commissioner Hamza Shaikh, DSP Ali Haider Jafri took charge. Soon after, he displays his abilities when he successfully catches a gang of bank robbers, albeit risking the lives of the bank's customers. Then the son of Continental Bank Chairman Srivastava was kidnapped and a ransom demand was made. Ali learns of this and intervenes, but is unable to save the child. This has resulted in much criticism of the mishandling of the incident. Then Ali's own world is turned upside down when his daughter Shagufta, who is about to marry Naseeruddin, son of Home Minister Syed Nooruddin Ahmed, is kidnapped along with Naseeruddin.

== Cast ==
- Dharmendra as Police Commissioner Ali Haider Jaffrey
- Raj Babbar as Home Minister Syed Nooruddin Ahmed
- Amrita Singh as Principal Nahim Bilgrami
- Pratibha Sinha as Shagufta 'Shagufi' Haider Jaffrey
- Sumeet Saigal as Naseeruddin 'Naseer' Ahmed
- Neena Gupta as Mrs. Fahimida Nooruddin Ahmed
- Farida Jalal as Akbari
- Puneet Issar as Bhai Khan
- Gufi Paintal as Continental Bank Chairman Srivastava
- Arjun as DSP Singh

== Music ==
The music is composed by Nadeem–Shravan duo and the lyricist is Sameer. Most of the song sung by Kumar Sanu also Asha Bhosle, Sadhana Sargam and Alka Yagnik.

=== Track listing ===
All lyrics are written by Sameer Anjaan; all music is composed by Nadeem-Shravan.

No.	Title	Singer (s)	Length
1.	"Tumhari Nazron Mein Humne Dekha"	Asha Bhosle, Kumar Sanu	5:04
2.	"Kar Na Sake Hum Pyar Ka Sauda"	Asha Bhosle, Kumar Sanu	6:16
3.	"Kisi Meherban Ne Aake"	Asha Bhosle, Kumar Sanu	5:51
4.	"Aaj Raat Chandni Hai"	Kumar Sanu, Sadhana Sargam	2:41
5.	"Jabse Dekha Tumko"	Asha Bhosle, Kumar Sanu	5:41
6.	"Aaj Raat Chandni Hai"	Kumar Sanu, Sadhana Sargam, Alka Yagnik	5:21
7.	"Sabse Hum Door Huye"	Kumar Sanu, Sadhana Sargam	6:53
8.	"Hamare Khwabon Ke"	Asha Bhosle	1:11
9.	"Aaj Raat Chandni Hai"	Sadhana Sargam	2:41
10.	"Kyon Ladkiyan Humse"	Asha Bhosle, Kumar Sanu	6:38
11.	"Nazm"	Dharmendra, Pratibha	2:28
Total length:			50:18
