= Pratigyabadh =

- DVD cover
- Directed by: Ravi Chopra
- Written by: Sachin Bhowmick; Rahi Masoom Reza; Satish Bhatnagar
- Produced by: B. R. Chopra
- Starring: Mithun Chakraborty; Kumar Gaurav; Neelam Kothari; Sunil Dutt
- Cinematography: Dharm R. Chopra
- Music by: Kalyanji-Anandji; Hassan Kamal (lyrics)
- Production company: BR Films
- Release date: 19 July 1991
- Running time: 125 minutes
- Country: India
- Language: Hindi

Pratigyabadh is a 1991 Indian Hindi-language drama film directed by Ravi Chopra starring Sunil Dutt, Mithun Chakraborty, Kumar Gaurav, Neelam Kothari, Sujata Mehta and Beena Banerjee.

== Plot ==
Pratigyabadh is the story of simpleton Shankar and his brother and sister, and corrupt the hurdles they face in life. Shankar is enraged and grows up to become the right-hand man of Pascal, who is a smuggler of gold. In early childhood, he has seen his mother getting brutally raped by a truck driver and dying in front of him. She wants to take revenge on the truck driver and a moneylender because of whom his family had become homeless.

Years later, Shankar discovers that the truck driver becomes family a dangerous smuggler known as Tej Bahadur. However, the circumstances bring Shankar and his enemies face to face and however, he takes revenge his battles against them forms the story.

== Cast ==
- Sunil Dutt as Pascal
- Mithun Chakraborty as Shankar Yadav
- Kumar Gaurav as Advocate Shakti Yadav
- Neelam Kothari as Shobhna
- Sujata Mehta as Phoolrani
- Lalit Tiwari as Baburam Yadav
- Beena Banerjee as Laxmi Baburam Yadav (Shankar, Shakti, Shila's mother)
- Amita Nangia as Shila
- Shafi Inamdar as Advocate S. Merchant
- Anupam Kher as Tej Bahadur/Tejaa/Shersingh
- Yunus Parvez as Lala Kedarnath
- Sharat Saxena as Tarzan
- Asrani as Khairatlal, Shankar's friend
- Girja Shankar as Lala Sukhilal
- Mulraj Rajda as village Sarpanch
- Mayur Verma as Police Inspector Dholakia
- Ashalata Wabgaonkar as Nun
- Roopesh Kumar as Henchman Sameer
- Javed Hyder as Adolscent Shankar

== Soundtrack ==
All songs are written by Hasan Kamal.

#	Title	Singer(s)
1	"O Jane-e-jana Jane Bahara Sun"	Sadhana Sargam, Anwar
2	"Kale Rang Di Madhani"	Sonali Bajpayee
3	"Dhin Tara Bole Man Ka Ik Tara" (Duet)	Mahendra Kapoor, Anuradha Paudwal
4	"Rama Ho Rama Tere Ishq Me Mat Mori Mari Gayi"	Kumar Sanu, Alka Yagnik
5	"Dhin Tara Bole Man Ka Ik Tara" (Male)	Mahendra Kapoor
6	"Are Hey Ri Chhori Malan Ki" (Folk Song)	Kumar Sanu
7	"Dhin Tara Bole Man Ka Ik Tara" (Female)	Anuradha Paudwal
