= Bhabhi (1957 film) =

- Poster
- Directed by: Krishnan–Panju
- Written by: Rajendra Krishan
- Produced by: A. V. Meiyappan
- Starring: Balraj Sahni; Pandari Bai; Nanda; Om Prakash; Durga Khote
- Cinematography: S. Maruti Rao
- Edited by: S. Panjabi
- Music by: Chitragupta
- Production company: AVM Productions
- Distributed by: AVM Productions
- Release date: 1957
- Running time: 168 minutes
- Country: India
- Language: Hindi/Urdu
- Box office: Rs. 1,15,00,000

Bhabhi is a 1957 Hindi film directed by Krishnan–Panju for AVM Productions. It starred Balraj Sahni, Pandari Bai, Jagdeep and Nanda in pivotal roles.

The film went on to become the eighth highest grossing Bollywood film of the year. The film was a remake of the 1954 Bengali film Bhanga Gara, which in turn was based on the novel Bijila by Prabhavathi Devi Saraswathi. The Bengali movie was earlier remade in Tamil as Kula Deivam and later remade in Kannada as Jenu Goodu. Pandari Bai reprised her role in all versions except the Bengali one.

== Summary ==
Although a graduate in Arts, Shanta (Pandari Bai) agrees to marry a less educated widowed businessman Ratanlal (Balraj Sahni), shortly called Ratan, who has a son Mithu (Daisy Irani), from his first marriage and re-locates to live with him, his three brothers; Ramesh (Jawahar Kaul), Rajan (Raja Gosavi) and Baldev (Jagdeep) and his aunt (Durga Khote). Ratanlal permits Shanta to let her child-widowed sister, Lata (Nanda), to also live with them. Shanta soon earns the respect and love of everyone in the family. Ramesh marries Tara (Shyama), the daughter of Advocate Motilal (Bipin Gupta), while Rajan marries Mangala (Nalini Chonkar), the daughter of Munshiram (Shivraj). After these marriages, misunderstandings crop up, generally generated by Mangala, so much so that Tara joins forces with her, forcing the brothers to separate from each other, with Ratanlal dividing the property and business equally amongst them, and re-locating in a small village house, while Ramesh now lives with Tara and her brother, Jeevan (Anwar Hussain) and his wife. Rajan does not get along with Mangala, takes to alcohol in a big way, stops his medical studies and joins the army and Baldev relocates to Bombay. The film chronicles if this troubled family would ever be reunited.

== Cast ==
- Balraj Sahni as Ratanlal "Ratan"
- Pandari Bai as Shanta
- Nanda as Lata
- Daisy Irani as Mithu
- Jawahar Kaul as Advocate Ramesh
- Shyama as Tara
- Raja Gosavi as Rajan
- Nalini Chonkar as Mangala
- Jagdeep as Baldev "Billu"
- Durga Khote as Ratanlal's Aunty
- Om Prakash as Lata's Brother-in-law
- Manorama as Lata's Sister-in-law
- Bipin Gupta as Advocate Motilal
- Shivraj as Munshiram
- Anwar Hussain as Jeevan
- Agha as Champaklal
- Bhagwan Dada as Stage Actor

== Soundtrack ==
Lyrics written by Rajendra Krishan.

Song	Singer	Raga
"Ja Re Jadugar"	Lata Mangeshkar	
"Kare Kare Badra Ja Re"	Lata Mangeshkar	
"Tie Lagake Mana Ban Gaye"	Lata Mangeshkar	
"Chali Chali Re Patang Meri Chali Re"	Lata Mangeshkar, Mohammed Rafi	
"Chhupakar Meri Aankhon Ko Woh Poochhe"	Lata Mangeshkar, Mohammed Rafi	
"Hai Bahut Dinon Ki Baat, Tha Ek Majnu Aur Ek Laila"	S. Balbir, Manna Dey, Mohammed Rafi	
"Chal Ud Ja Re Panchhi"	Mohammed Rafi	Pahadi
"Jawan Ho Ya Budhiya"	Mohammed Rafi	

== Awards and nominations ==
Year	Nominee / work	Award	Result
1958	Nanda	Filmfare Award for Best Supporting Actress	Nominated
