= Naya Nasha =

- Directed by: Hari Dutt
- Produced by: C. V. K. Sastry
- Starring: Nanda; Ranjit Mallick
- Music by: Sapan Chakraborty
- Release date: 1973
- Country: India
- Language: Hindi

Naya Nasha is a 1973 Bollywood action film directed by Hari Dutt. The film stars Nanda and Ranjit Mallick in lead roles.

== Plot ==
The story follows Reena, a wealthy young woman who falls into drug addiction due to boredom. She ultimately finds her life complicated, leading to a problem for both her and her family.

== Cast ==
- Ranjit Mallick as Dr. Samar Chaudhary
- Nanda as Reena Chaudhary
- Asit Sen as Reena's Grandfather
- Manmohan Krishna as Reena's Father
- Achala Sachdev as Reena's Mother
- Ramesh Deo as Protesting Student's Father
- Seema Deo as Protesting Student's Mother
- Nana Palsikar as Protesting Student's Father
- Madan Puri as Politician
- Prithviraj Kapoor as Rana
- Amrit Patel as Kundan
- Sharad Kumar as Sharad
- Murad as Judge
- Amitabh Bachchan as Narrator

== Soundtrack ==
The music was composed by Sapan Chakraborty and released by Saregama. All lyrics were written by Anand Bakshi.

Naya Nasha

Soundtrack album by Sapan Chakraborty
- Released: 1973
- Recorded: 1973
- Genre: Soundtrack
- Length: 14:51
- Label: Saregama
- Producer: Sapan Chakraborty

Sapan Chakraborty chronology
Naya Nasha (1973)	36 Ghante (1974)

Song	Singer
"Ek Ladki Le Gayi Dil"	Kishore Kumar
"Aao Kare Baaten"	Lata Mangeshkar
"Mujhse Aisi Bhool Hui"	Asha Bhosle
"Kash Pe Kash Lagane De"	Asha Bhosle
