= Aanchal (1960 film) =

1960 film directed by Vasant Joglekar

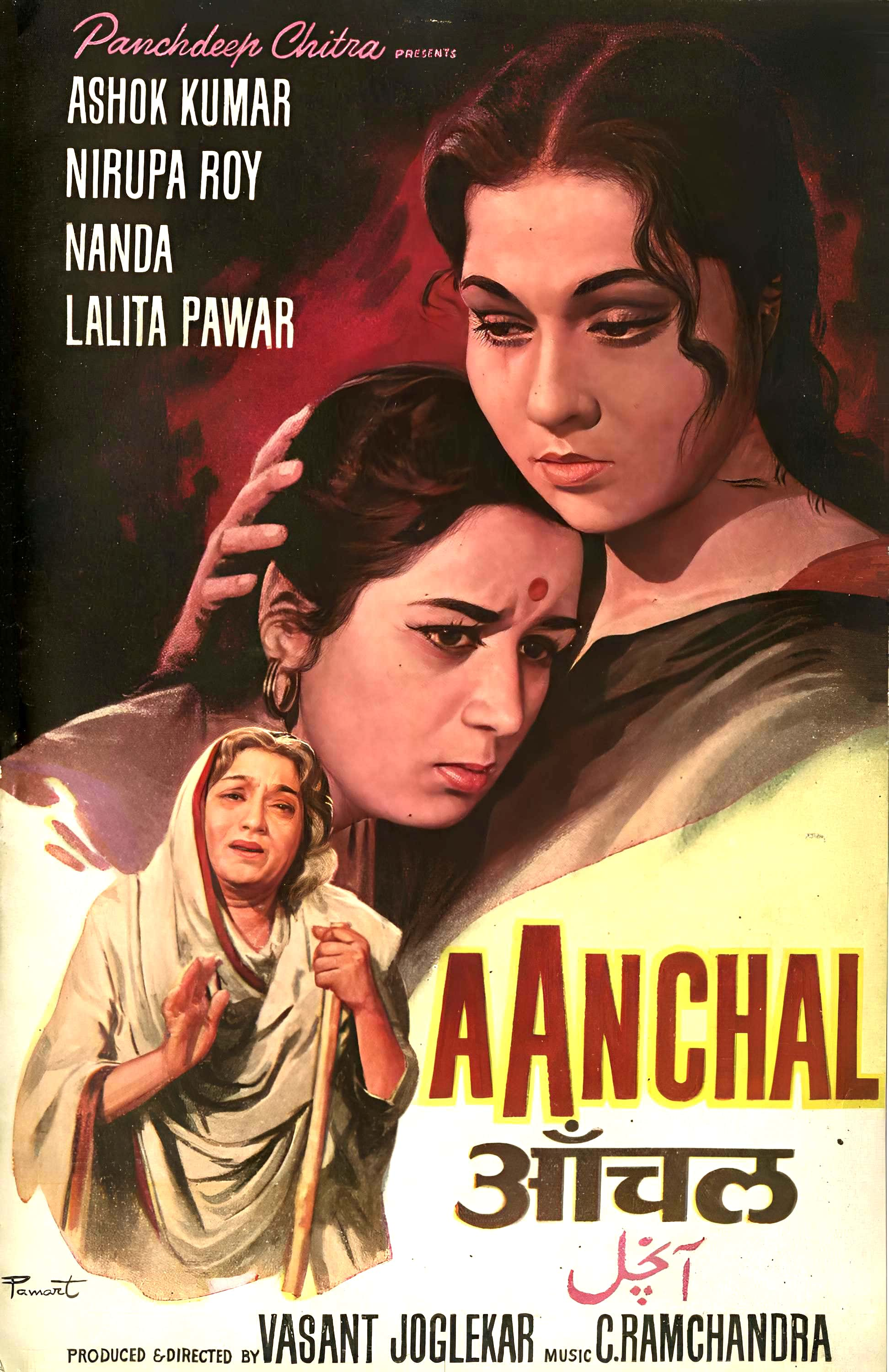
- Poster
- Directed by: Vasant Joglekar
- Starring: Ashok Kumar; Nirupa Roy; Nanda
- Music by: C. Ramchandra
- Production company: Panchdeep Chitra
- Release date: 1960
- Country: India
- Language: Hindi

Aanchal is a 1960 Hindi drama movie directed by Vasant Joglekar. The film stars Ashok Kumar, Nirupa Roy, Nanda in lead roles. The music was composed by C. Ramchandra.

== Cast ==
- Ashok Kumar as Ramu
- Nirupa Roy as Janki
- Nanda as Chanda
- Sudesh Kumar as Inspector Sundar
- Om Prakash as Constable Dharamdas
- Lalita Pawar as Ramu's Mother
- Dhumal as Laxmidas
- Iftekhar as Mohan

== Soundtrack ==
Song	Singer
"Ghunghat Kali Ka Na Khol"	Asha Bhosle
"Ga Rahi Hai Zindagi Har Taraf Bahar Mein Kis Liye"	Asha Bhosle, Mahendra Kapoor
"Ae Ji O Kuch To Bolo, Itni Kyun Humse Naaraaz Ho"	Asha Bhosle, Mahendra Kapoor
"Nache Re Nache Re, Radha Nache Sakhiyan Nache Re"	Asha Bhosle, Suman Kalyanpur
"Sanwariya Re" (Happy)	Suman Kalyanpur
"Sanwariya Re" (Sad)	Suman Kalyanpur
"Tu Har Ek Museebat Ka"	Sudhir Phadke

== Awards and nominations ==
Year	Nominee / work	Award	Result
1961	Nanda	Filmfare Award for Best Supporting Actress	Won
