= Banda Yeh Bindaas Hai =

Unreleased film by Ravi Chopra

- Directed by: Ravi Chopra
- Based on: My Cousin Vinny
- Produced by: Ravi Chopra
- Starring: Govinda; Tabu; Lara Dutta; Boman Irani
- Cinematography: Barun Mukherjee
- Edited by: Akiv Ali
- Music by: Shankar–Ehsaan–Loy
- Production company: BR Films
- Country: India
- Language: Hindi

Banda Yeh Bindaas Hai (transl. This guy is cool) is an unreleased Indian Hindi-language comedy film directed by Ravi Chopra, starring Govinda, Tabu, Lara Dutta, and Boman Irani. It is a remake of the American film My Cousin Vinny (1992).

== Cast ==
- Govinda as Raj Ahuja
- Tabu as Suman
- Lara Dutta as Naina
- Ashish Chaudhary as Jimmy Malhotra
- Vishal Malhotra as Virendra
- Boman Irani as Veer Ahuja
- Rajpal Yadav as Naurangilal
- Satish Shah as Satish Malhotra
- Zakir Hussain as Ashraf Iqbal

== Plagiarism charge ==
The director was served with a legal notice in 2009 by 20th Century Fox, which charged that the film blatantly plagiarised their 1992 film My Cousin Vinny. Chopra and the production company, Mumbai-based BR Films, denied the charges in court in May 2009; the film's release was to be delayed until June 2009 by order of the Bombay High Court.

A lawsuit was filed against BR Films by 20th Century Fox for copying their film without buying the rights. Fox sought damages of $1.4 million; they had given Chopra permission "to make a film loosely based on the Oscar-winning movie" but concluded the final product was a "substantial reproduction" of the original. Fox eventually accepted a $200,000 settlement from the film's producer, although since the death of director Ravi Chopra in 2014, it has not seen a theatrical release.

The Telegraph, listing a number of other Bollywood movies "inspired" by Hollywood blockbusters, noted that the case would "decide whether Indian filmmakers can continue to get their 'inspiration' with impunity, or buy rights the legal way."
