= Akhtar ul Iman =

Urdu poet and screenwriter (1915–1966)

Akhtar ul Iman اختر الایمان
- Born: 12 November 1915; Qila Patthargarh, Najibabad, Bijnor district
- Died: 9 March 1996 (aged 80); Mumbai, Maharashtra, India
- Resting place: Bandra Qabristan, Mumbai
- Education: Master of Arts degree in Urdu Literature
- Alma mater: Zakir Husain Delhi College; Aligarh Muslim University
- Occupations: Poet; screenwriter
- Employer(s): Freelance and B.R. Films assigned cine writer (1960–1980)
- Known for: Urdu Nazm, poet screenwriter and playwright
- Spouse: Sultana Iman
- Children: 4

Signature
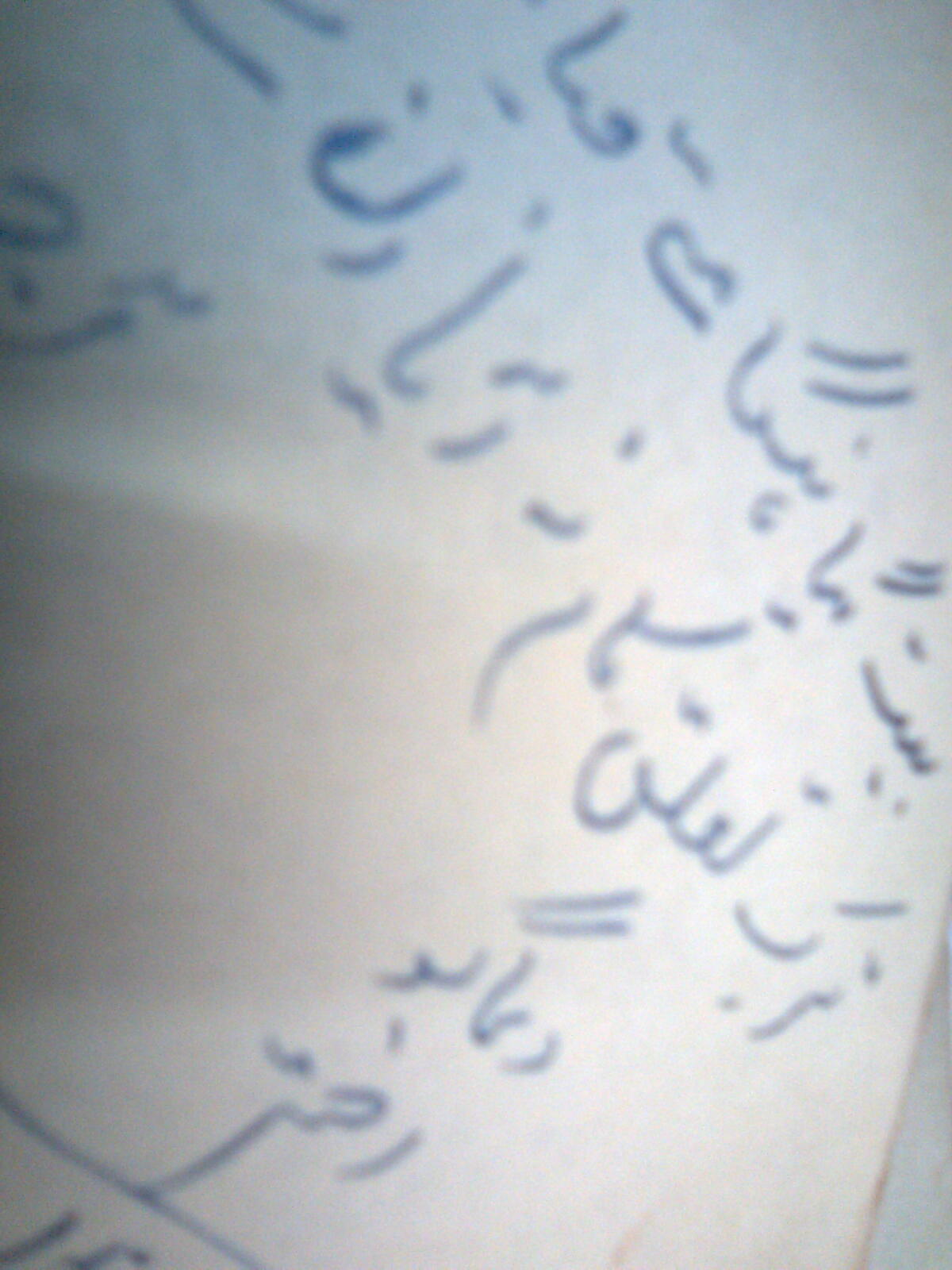

Akhtar ul Iman (12 November 1915 – 9 March 1996) was a noted Urdu poet and screenwriter in Hindi cinema, who had a major influence on modern Urdu nazm.

He won the Filmfare Award for Best Dialogue in 1963 for Dharmputra and 1966 for Waqt. He was awarded the 1962 Sahitya Akademi Award in Urdu, for his Poetry Collection, Yadein (Memories), by Sahitya Akademi, India's National Academy of Letters.

== Early life and education ==
Born on 12 November 1915 in Qila Patthargarh, Najibabad, in the Bijnor district of Uttar Pradesh in 1915. He was brought up in an orphanage. He gained his initial education at Bijnor, where he came in contact with poet and scholar Khurshid ul Islam, who taught at Aligarh Muslim University and developed a long association with Ralph Russell. He graduated from the Zakir Husain College at University of Delhi and completed his master's in Urdu degree from Aligarh Muslim University.

== Career ==
He first joined All India Radio as a staff artist. Then Iman joined the Filmistan Studio as a dialogue writer in 1945.

He preferred nazm over more popular ghazal as a mean of poetic expression. Akhtar ul Iman's language is "coarse and unpoetic". He uses "coarse" and mundane poetic expressions to make his message effective and realistic.

He left behind a substantial legacy for new generation of poets to follow which explores new trends and themes in modern Urdu poetry giving a new direction to the modern and contemporary Urdu nazm with emphasis on philosophical humanism.

== Works ==
=== Books ===
• Iss Aabad Kharabe Mein (Urdu)-published by Urdu Academy, Delhi, India. Autobiography of a famous Urdu writer of India.

=== Poetry ===
He has published eight collections:

- Girdaab (1943)
- Aabjoo (1944–1945)
- Tareek Sayyara (1946–47)
- Yaden (1961)
- Bint-e-Lamhaat (1969)
- Naya Ahang (1977)
- Sar-o-Samaan (1982)
- Zameen Zameen (1983–1990)
- Kulliyaat-e-Akhter-ul-Iman (2000)

Play

- Sabrang (1948): a one-verse play.

=== Translation and compilation by others ===
- Zamistan Sard Mehrika (Urdu)- Last Poetic Collection of an unforgettable Urdu poet. Compiled and edited by Sultana Iman and Bedar Bakht.
- Query of the Road – Selected Poems of Akhtar-ul-Iman with Extensive Commentary by Baidar Bakht

== Indian cinema ==
His contribution to Hindi cinema is significant, keeping in mind the number of landmark and hit movies he has contributed as a script writer (dialogue, story and screenplay). His first landmark movie was Kanoon (1960 film), which became a big hit despite the fact that it had no songs or comedy sequences. Other important movies to which he contributed as a script writer were Dharmputra (1961) – for which he received a filmfare award – Gumrah, Waqt, Patther ke Sanam, and Daagh.

The one movie which has his lyrics is Bikhare Moti.

== Awards ==
Literary awards

- 1962: Sahitya Akademi Award – Urdu: Yadein (Poetry)

and Numerous other literary awards.

- Filmfare Award
  - 1963: Best Dialogue: Dharmputra
  - 1966: Best Dialogue: Waqt

== Filmography ==
- Vijay (1988) – writer
- Chor Police (1983) – writer
- Lahu Pukarega (1980) – director
- Do Musafir (1978) – writer
- Chandi Sona (1977) – writer
- Zameer (1975) – writer
- 36 Ghante (1974) – writer
- Roti (1974) – writer
- Naya Nasha (1973) – writer
- Bada Kabutar (1973) – writer
- Daag (1973) – writer
- Dhund (1973) – writer
- Joshila (1973) – writer
- Kunwara Badan (1973) – writer
- Dastaan (1972) – writer
- Joroo Ka Ghulam (1972) – writer
- Aadmi Aur Insaan (1969) – writer
- Chirag (1969) – writer
- Ittefaq (1969) – writer
- Aadmi (1968) – writer
- Hamraaz (1967) – writer
- Patthar Ke Sanam (1967) – writer
- Gaban (1966) – writer
- Mera Saaya (1966) – writer
- Phool Aur Patthar (1966) – writer
- Bhoot Bungla (1965) – writer
- Waqt (1965) – writer
- Shabnam (1964) – writer
- Yaadein (1964) – writer
- Aaj Aur Kal (1963) – writer
- Akeli Mat Jaiyo (1963) – writer
- Gumrah (1963) – writer
- Neeli Aankhen (1962) – writer
- Dharmputra (1961) – writer
- Flat No. 9 (1961) – writer
- Barood (1960) – writer
- Kalpana (1960) – writer
- Kanoon (1960) – writer
- Nirdosh (1950) – writer
- Actress (1948) – writer
- Jharna (1948) – writer

== Death and survivors ==
Akhtar ul Iman died on 9 March 1996 in Mumbai at age 80. He also was the father-in-law of actor Amjad Khan.

== Cited sources ==
- Rajadhyaksha, Ashish (1999). Encyclopaedia of Indian cinema. Internet Archive. London : British Film Institute. ISBN 978-0-85170-669-6.
