= Iftekhar =

Indian actor (1920–1995)

- Born: Syedna Iftekhar Ahmed Sharif; 26 February 1922; Jalandhar, Punjab, British India (present-day Punjab, India)
- Died: 1 March 1995 (aged 73); Mumbai, Maharashtra, India
- Other name: Iftikhar
- Occupation: Film actor
- Years active: 1944–1994
- Spouse: Rehana Ahmad
- Children: Salma (daughter); Saeeda (daughter)

Syedna Iftekhar Ahmed Sharif (26 February 1922 – 1 March 1995), often mononym as Iftekhar or Iftikhar, was an Indian actor who mainly worked in Hindi cinema. He is known for his film roles as a police officer.

== Early life ==
Iftekhar was born in Jalandhar on 26 February 1922 and was the eldest among four brothers and a sister. After completing his matriculation, Iftekhar did a diploma course in painting from Lucknow College Of Arts. Iftekhar had a passion for singing and was impressed with the famous singer K. L. Saigal, besides intending to become a singer like him.

== Career ==
At the age of 20, Iftekhar travelled to Kolkata for an audition conducted by the music composer Kamal Dasgupta, who was then serving for His Master's Voice. Dasgupta took an audition test of Iftekhar for HMV which, Iftekhar successfully passed. HMV thereby released a private album featuring 2 songs sung by Iftekhar following which, he returned to Kanpur. However, after a few days of returning to Kanpur, he got a telegram from M. P. Production, insisting he return to Kolkata. Dasgupta was so impressed by Iftekhar's personality that he recommended his name to M. P. Production as an actor. However, despite his return to Kolkata upon being called by M. P. Production, no film with him in it could launch soon.

Ultimately, amidst a long gap, Iftekhar finally made his debut as an actor with a leading role in the film Taqraar (1944), which was made under the banner of Art Films-Kolkata. He then appeared in Ghar and Rajlaxmi (both 1945). In Taqraar and Ghar, he was cast opposite Jamuna Barua while in the latter, he appeared alongside Kanan Devi. This was followed by Aisa Kyun and Tum Aur Mai (both 1947).

Many of Iftekhar's close relatives, including his parents and siblings, migrated to Pakistan during the partition. He would have preferred to stay in Calcutta, but rioting forced him to leave Calcutta. Along with his wife and daughters, he moved to Bombay and arrived in 1948, where they struggled to make ends meet. Being unable to find work immediately, Jamuna Barua volunteered to work as a certain Mr. Patanwala's secretary to fulfil the basic household needs while Iftekhar himself continued to do whatever insignificant roles he was being offered then. Iftekhar had been introduced to actor Ashok Kumar during his time in Calcutta and contacted him in Bombay, gaining a role in the Bombay Talkies movie Muqaddar (1950). Iftekhar acted in over 400 films in a career that spanned from the 1940s through to the early 1990s.

His brother, Imtiaz Ahmed, was a famous TV character actor of PTV (Pakistan Television), especially Afshan and Tanhaiyan. Like many of the older character actors who populated the Bollywood universe of the 1960s and 1970s, Iftekhar had been a lead actor in his youth during the "golden age" of Bollywood, in the 1940s and 1950s. His roles ranged from father, uncle, great-uncle, grandfather, police officer, police commissioner, courtroom judge and doctor. He also did negative roles in Bandini, Sawan Bhadon, Call Girl, Khel Khel Mein and Agent Vinod.

In the 1960s and 1970s, Iftekhar graduated to playing uncle, father, and what came to be his speciality: police inspector roles, doctor or senior advocate. Generally he played "sympathetic" characters but, on occasion, he played the heavy. One of his most memorable roles as a heavy was as Amitabh Bachchan's corrupt industrialist mentor in Yash Chopra's classic Deewaar (1975). Another of Iftekhar's classic roles was as the police inspector in Prakash Mehra's Zanjeer. It was a small part, but the scene where Iftekhar reprimands the near-hysteric Amitabh Bachchan for taking the law into his own hands is incredibly powerful. Another important role as a police officer was played by him in the 1978 hit film Don. Some of his major roles came in Rajesh Khanna films such as Joroo Ka Ghulam, Mehboob Ki Mehndi, The Train, Khamoshi, Safar, Raja Rani, Ittefaq, Rajput and Awam.

Besides Deewaar and Zanjeer, Iftekhar had character roles in many of the classics of 1960s, 1970s, 1980s Bollywood cinema: Bimal Roy's Bandini, Raj Kapoor's Sangam, Manoj Kumar's Shaheed, Teesri Manzil, Teesri Kasam, Johny Mera Naam, Haré Rama Haré Krishna, Don, The Gambler (1971 film), Ankhiyon Ke Jharokhon Se (1978) and Sholay, to name but a few.

Apart from Hindi films, he appeared in two episodes of the American TV series Maya in 1967 as well the English language films Bombay Talkie (1970) and City of Joy (1992).

== Personal life ==
During his Kanpur days, he was engaged with a girl named Saeeda. However, upon reaching Kolkata, he fell for a Jewish woman named Hannah Joseph, who shared the same building he was living in. Ultimately, he severed ties with Saeeda and married Hannah towards the early 1940s. Post marriage, Hannah Joseph was renamed Rehana Ahmad. Together, they had 2 daughters Salma (born 1946) and Saeeda (1947 - 7 February 1995), probably named after his ex-fiancee.. Rehana herself died on 27 May 2013 when she was in her early 90s.

Being a painter as well, Iftekhar taught painting to Ashok Kumar for which, Kumar always addressed Iftekhar as hid Painting Guru. Iftekhar's calibre as a painter was shown through the background paintings he drew for the credit sequence of Kishore Kumar's film Door Gagan Ki Chhaon Mein (1964).

Salma had a love marriage to Vipin Chandra Jain in 1964, who in turn came from a very rich family of Dehradun and who arrived in Mumbai to become a Hindi film actor. Jain's grandfather Rai Bahadur Ugrasen Jain had been a renowned entrepreneur and was the chairman of Dehradun Municipal Corporation. Post marriage, Salma went to Dehradun too where she taught English in a college. They had a son and a daughter but she eventually returned back to Mumbai in 1979. For the next 20 years, she worked as the secretary and manager of producer N. C. Sippy at his office. During one of her journeys to Pakistan where her father's family resided, she came across Saeeda, the woman Iftekhar was earlier engaged to during his Kanpur days. Through their warm conversation, it was revealed Saeeda ultimately remained unmarried.

Saeeda was married to M. I. Sheikh stayed at Juhu, Mumbai. He was a manager of CIAT Tyres and they had 2 children. Later, Saeeda was diagnosed with cancer and after 5 years of being diagnosed, she succumbed to the disease on 1 March 1995.

Unable to bear the loss of his younger daughter, his diabetes suddenly shot up high. He was admitted to Suchak Hospital, Malad (East) but his condition worsened and he died on 1 March 1995, 24 days after Saeeda's demise.

== Selected filmography ==
=== Hindi ===
Year	Film	Role	Notes
1944	Taqrar		Debut film & role
1945	Ghar		
1945	Rajlaxmi		
1949	Patanga	Gardener	
1950	Lajawab		
1950	Muqaddar		
1951	Sagai	Chandni's father	
1952	Ashiana	Jeevan	
1952	Saqi	Abdul	
1953	Aabshar		
1953	Ek Do Teen	Shekhar	
1954	Biraj Bahu	Kishorilal	
1954	Mirza Ghalib	Badshah	
1954	Naukri		
1955	Devdas	Dwijdas Mukherjee	
1955	Flying Man		
1955	Shree 420	Police Inspector	
1955	Society		
1956	Jagte Raho	Chandu	
1956	Samundari Daku		
1956	Taksaal		
1957	Ab Dilli Dur Nahin	Police Inspector	
1957	Bandi	Ramesh Sharma	Uncredited guest appearance
1958	Dilli Ka Thug	Dilip Singh	
1958	Night Club	Police Inspector	
1958	Raagini	Villager	
1958	Sitaron Se Agey	Mohan	
1959	Bedard Zamana Kya Jane	Public Prosecutor	
1959	Fashionable Wife	Girdharilal	
1959	Kangan	Ramesh Bhatia	
1959	Mr. John		
1959	Naach Ghar		
1959	Raat Ke Rahi	Watson	
1960	Aanchal	Mohan	
1960	Chhabili		
1960	Kalpana	Johar	
1960	Kanoon	Savarkar	
1961	Dark Street		
1961	Kanch Ki Gudiya	Ghosh	
1961	Kismet Palat Ke Dekh		
1961	Modern Girl	Pharmacist	
1961	Roop Ki Rani Choron Ka Raja	fellow traveller	Uncredited guest appearance
1961	Zamana Badal Gaya		
1962	Pathan		
1962	Professor	Artist	
1962	Rangoli	Police Inspector	
1962	Soorat Aur Seerat		
1963	Bandini	Chutti	
1963	Gharni Shobha		
1963	Grahasti	Harish Chandra Khanna's brother-in-law	
1963	Meri Surat Teri Ankhen	Prakash	
1963	Yeh Rastey Hain Pyar Ke	Byomkesh Mukherjee's junior lawyer	
1964	Apne Huye Paraye	Public Prosecutor	
1964	Awara Badal	Darshan Singh	
1964	Cha Cha Cha	Family doctor	
1964	Door Gagan Ki Chhaon Mein	Jagga	Also drew the background paintings shown during the credit sequence of this film.
1964	Sangam	Indian Air Force Officer	
1964	Shehnai	Amarjeet's friend	
1965	Guide	Police Inspector	
1965	Shaheed	Public Prosecutor, Lahore	
1966	Ajnabi		
1966	Phool Aur Patthar	Babu	
1966	Pinjre Ke Panchhi	Police Inspector	
1966	Sagaai	Hospital doctor	
1966	Teesri Kasam	Vikram Singh	
1966	Teesri Manzil	Police Inspector	
1967	Duniya Nachegi	Jagdish	
1967	Hamraaz	Jagmohan Kumar	
1968	Do Dooni Char	Bukhari	
1968	Sunghursh	Shankar Prasad	
1969	Aadmi Aur Insaan	Saxena	
1969	Intaquam	Police Inspector	
1969	Ittefaq	Karwe	
1969	Khamoshi	Doctor	
1969	Pyar Ka Mausam	Keshav	
1969	Rahgir		
1969	Sajan	Police Inspector	
1970	Bhai-Bhai	Police Inspector	
1970	Insaan Aur Shaitan	Barna	
1970	Johny Mera Naam	Mehta	
1970	My Love	Doctor	
1970	Prem Pujari	Indian army	
1970	Safar	Prosecutor	
1970	Sau Saal Beet Gaye	Indrajeet Singh	
1970	Sawan Bhadon	Gauri Shankar	
1970	The Train	Police Commissioner	
1970	Tum Haseen Main Jawaan	Anuradha's father	
1971	Do Raha	Geeta's father	
1971	Door Ka Raahi	John	
1971	Elaan	Police Chief	
1971	Gambler		
1971	Hare Rama Hare Krishna	IGP	
1971	Irada	Police Inspector	
1971	Jal Bin Machhli Nritya Bin Bijli	Dr. Verma	
1971	Kal Aaj Aur Kal	Ram's friend	
1971	Mehboob Ki Mehndi	Nawab Safdar Jang	
1971	Sharmeelee	Colonel	
1972	Apradh	Police Inspector	
1972	Bees Saal Pehle	Lakshman	
1972	Dastaan	Prosecutor	
1972	Ek Bar Mooskura Do		
1972	Jawani Diwani	Thakur	
1972	Joroo Ka Ghulam	Kalpana's uncle	
1972	Kundan		
1972	Parchhaiyan	Choudhary Shyamlal	
1972	Pyaar Diwana		
1972	Rani Mera Naam		
1972	Tanhai	Madanlal Kapoor	
1972	Yeh Gulistan Hamara	Vijay's Captain	
1972	Zindagi Zindagi	Ismail	
1973	Achanak	Bakshi	
1973	Anamika	Dr. Irshad Hussain	
1973	Black Mail	Mehta	
1973	Daag: A Poem of Love	Singh	
1973	Ek Nari Do Roop	Dinesh	
1973	Gaddar	Professor	
1973	Haathi Ke Daant		
1973	Jheel Ke Us Paar	Diwan	
1973	Joshila	Police Inspector	
1973	Loafer	Police Commissioner	
1973	Nanha Shikari		
1973	Nirdosh		
1973	Raja Rani	Suresh's father	
1973	Sonal		
1973	Zanjeer	Singh	
1974	36 Ghante	Vijay's father	
1974	Azad Mohabbat		
1974	Badla	Lobo	
1974	Benaam		
1974	Call Girl	Sonachand	
1974	Chor Chor	Police Commissioner	
1974	Dak Bangla		
1974	Ishq Ishq Ishq	Ghumli	
1974	Jeevan Sangram	Police Inspector	
1974	Majboor	Khurana	
1974	Patthar Aur Payal	B.K. Varma	
1974	Pran Jaye Par Vachan Na Jaye	Dhanraj	
1974	Raja Kaka		
1974	Raja Shiv Chhatrapati		
1974	Ujala Hi Ujala	Jamuna Prasad	
1974	Woh Main Nahin	Prosecutor	
1974	Zehreela Insaan	Vishamber Nath	
1975	Aakhri Dao	Khurana	
1975	Badnaam		
1975	Chori Mera Kaam	Police Commissioner	
1975	Deewaar	Mulk Raj Daavar	
1975	Dharmatma	Vikram Singh	
1975	Ek Hans Ka Jora	Tina's father	
1975	Jaan Hazir Hai		
1975	Khel Khel Mein	Bhupendra Singh	
1975	Mazaaq		
1975	Phanda		
1975	Saazish	Mohanlal Saxena	
1975	Sholay	Radha's Father	
1975	Zakhmee	Ashok Ganguly	
1976	Ek Se Badhkar Ek	Police Commissioner	Uncredited guest appearance
1976	Fakira	Sujit	
1976	Gumrah	Gupta	
1976	Jaaneman	Police Commissioner	
1976	Kabhi Kabhie	Malhotra	Uncredited guest appearance
1976	Laila Majnu	Emir Sharwari	
1976	Zindagi	Verma	
1977	Abhi To Jee Lein	Deepak's father	
1977	Agent Vinod	Madanlal	
1977	Apnapan	Kishan Agarwal	
1977	Chandi Sona	Police Commissioner	
1977	Dangal		
1977	Do Dilwale		
1977	Dulhan Wahi Jo Piya Man Bhaye	Dr. Fareed	
1977	Kali Raat		
1977	Karm	Shyamlal Kumar	
1977	Paapi	Raj Kumar's foster father	
1977	Phir Janam Lenge Hum / Janam Janam Ka Saathi		
1977	Videsh	Prasad Sinha	
1978	Ankhiyon Ke Jharokhon Se	Dr. Pradhan	
1978	Bandie	Raghuveer Singh	Dubbed in Bengali as well.
1978	Besharam	Police Commissioner	
1978	Don	D'Silva	
1978	Ganga Ki Saugand	Gupta	
1978	Khatta Meetha	Cooper	
1978	Khoon Ka Badla Khoon	Commissioner Kotwal	
1978	Khoon Ki Pukaar	Khan	
1978	Phaansi	Mahendra Pratap Singh	
1978	Tere Pyaar Mein		
1978	Trishul	P.L. Verma	
1978	Vishwanath	Mahanta	
1979	Do Ladke Dono Kadke	Shinde	
1979	Jhoota Kahin Ka	Police Inspector	
1979	Kaala Patthar	Harpal Singh	
1979	Love in Canada	Shatru Khanna	
1979	Mr. Natwarlal		
1979	Noorie	Ghulam Nabi	
1979	Shaayad	Prosecutor	
1979	Shikshaa	Dwarka Das Gupta	
1979	Surakshaa	C. B. I. Head	
1979	The Great Gambler	Deepchand	
1980	Bombay 405 Miles	Ranveer Singh	
1980	Cobra		
1980	Do Shatru	Karan Singh	
1980	Dostana	Prosecutor	
1980	Ganga Aur Sooraj		
1980	Humkadam	Dr. Fareed	
1980	Insaf Ka Tarazu	Judge	
1980	Jyoti Bane Jwala		
1980	Karz	Dr. Daniel	
1980	Maan Abhiman	Sumer Singh	
1980	Sanjh Ki Bela		
1980	The Burning Train	Jagmohan	
1980	Zalim	Kamat	
1981	Agni Pareeksha	Dr. Sen	
1981	Baseraa	Dr. B. K. Gokhale	
1981	Chehre Pe Chehra	Diana's father	
1981	Ghungroo Ki Awaaz	Dr. Dixit	
1981	Harjaee	Dr. Gupta	
1981	Khoon Aur Paani	Khan	
1981	Krodhi	Police Commissioner	
1981	Laparwah	Police Inspector	
1981	Naari	Hakeem Noor Ali	
1981	Raaz	Sharma	
1981	Rocky	Dr. Bhagwandas	
1981	Sannata	Verma	
1981	Wardaat	Police Chief	
1982	Apradhi Kaun ?	Khanna	
1982	Bezubaan	Amarnath	
1982	Dard Ka Rishta	Head of Tata hospital	
1982	Dil Hi Dil Mein	Sahni	
1982	Dulha Bikta Hai	Daulatrai Walia	
1982	Nikaah	Jumman	
1982	Rajput	Ram Avtaar Singh	
1982	Raksha	Head of the Secret Service	
1982	Saath Saath	Gupta	
1982	Sun Sajna	Karim	
1982	Yeh Vaada Raha	Dr. Sahni	
1983	Dharti Aakash	Sadanand Chaudhary	Television film
1983	Ganga Meri Maa		
1983	Haadsa	Police Inspector	
1983	Jaane Jaan	Kapoor	
1983	Mahaan	Police Commissioner	Uncredited guest appearance
1983	Main Awara Hoon	Dr. Rashid	
1983	Mangal Pandey	R.P. Gupta	Uncredited guest appearance
1983	Mazdoor	Kundan Lal Batra	
1983	Mawaali	Prosecutor	
1983	Qayamat	Sinha	
1983	Rachana	Doctor	
1983	Rishta Kagaz Ka	Bhatnagar	
1983	Sadma	Train Passenger	
1983	Sun Meri Laila	Abid Khan	
1984	Aaj Ki Awaaz	V.V. Deshmukh	
1984	Awaaz	Police Commissioner	
1984	Boxer	Rushdie	
1984	Dharm Aur Qanoon	Dr. John	
1984	Grahasthi	Karim	
1984	Hanste Khelte	Shanti Prasad Goel	
1984	Inquilaab	Bombay Police Commissioner	
1984	Jagir	Praveen Singh	
1984	Kanoon Kya Karega	Samant	
1984	Maqsad	Doctor	
1984	Mashaal	Doctor	
1984	Mujhe Shakti Do	Jyoti's father	
1984	Phulwari	Chowdhury	
1984	Prarthana		
1984	Ram Tera Desh	Police Commissioner	
1984	Yaadon Ki Zanjeer	C. B. I. Officer	
1984	Yeh Ishq Nahin Aasaan	Akhtar Mirza	
1985	Aaj Ka Daur		
1985	Aakhri Chaal		Television film
1985	Awara Baap	Bihari	
1985	Bond 303	Police Commissioner	
1985	Dekha Pyar Tumhara	Target's Managing Partner	
1985	Ek Daku Saher Mein	Shaukat Hussain	
1985	Hum Dono	Mathura Das	
1985	Jaanoo	Dr. Prabha's senior	
1985	Kabhi Ajnabi The	Pappa	
1985	Meri Jung	Garewal	
1985	Misaal	Nath	
1985	Phaansi Ke Baad	Mohammed Riyaz	
1985	Salma	Ustad	
1985	Tawaif	Lala Fakirchand	
1985	Yaar Kasam		
1985	Yudh	Police Commissioner	
1986	Angaaray	Khan	
1986	Bhagwaan Dada	Doctor	
1986	Khamosh Nigahen		
1986	Locket		
1986	Peechha Karro	Police Commissioner	
1986	Tan-Badan	Devendra Pratap	Uncredited guest appearance
1986	Zindagani	Sumitra's father	
1987	Awam	Ram Kumar	
1987	Himmat Aur Mehanat	Doctor	
1987	Insaniyat Ke Dushman	Senior Police Officer	
1987	Itihaas	Senior Police Officer	
1987	Marte Dam Tak	Lal	
1987	Nazrana	Advocate	
1988	Commando	Restaurant Manager	Uncredited guest appearance
1988	Falak	D'Souza	
1988	Main Tere Liye	Mehta	
1988	Nagin Ke Do Dushman		
1988	Paap Ko Jalaa Kar Raakh Kar Doonga	Inspector General of Police	
1988	Razia		
1988	Saaya		
1988	Sherni	Police Chief	
1988	Tamacha	Senior Officer	
1988	Woh Phir Aayegi	Raju's Dad	
1989	Akanksha	Employer	Television film
1989	Farz Ki Jung	Walia	
1989	Galiyon Ka Badshah	Police Commissioner	
1989	Guru	Dead person (only his photograph is used)	Uncredited
1989	Na-Insaafi	Ravi Khanna's father	
1989	Shiva	Principal	
1990	Jaan-E-Wafa		
1990	Kaaranama	Suraj's father	
1990	Kanoon Ki Zanjeer	Jailor	
1990	Karishma Kismat Ka		
1990	Maha-Sangram	Rahim	
1990	Vidrohi	Director General of Police	
1991	Iraada	Ali	
1991	Lakhpati		
1991	Patthar Ke Phool	Smuggler	
1992	Bekhudi		
1992	Hayratt		
1992	Khule-Aam	Pratap Singh Rana	
1993	Kala Coat	Khurana	Last role
2008	Yaar Meri Zindagi	Munim	Delayed posthomous release; completed in 1971.

=== English ===
Year	Film	Role	Notes
1965	The Guide	Police Inspector	
1967-1968	Maya	Jang Bahadur	Television series
1970	Bombay Talkie	Vizarat Khan	
1970	The Evil Within	Hanif	
1984	The Far Pavilions	Nakshaband Khan	Television mini series

=== Bengali ===
Year	Film	Role	Notes
1956	Ek Din Ratre	Chandu	Bengali version of Jagte Raho (1956)
1978	Bandie	Raghuveer Singh	Hindi version of the same title.
1982	Agent Raaj	Avinash Ghoshal	

=== French ===
Year	Film	Role	Notes
1989	Nocturne Indien	Theosophy professor	
1992	City of Joy	Hasari's father	

=== Punjabi ===
Year	Film	Role	Notes
1985	Maujaan Dubai Diyaan	Roshan Lal	
