= Bandi (1957 film) =

1957 Hindi language film

- Directed by: Satyen Bose
- Written by: Mahendra Pran; Shailajanand Mukherjee
- Produced by: Benu Dutt
- Starring: Kishore Kumar; Ashok Kumar; Shyama; Nanda Karnataki
- Cinematography: Madan Sinha
- Edited by: Dulal Dutta
- Music by: Hemant Kumar
- Production company: Sree Pictures
- Distributed by: Sree Pictures
- Release date: June 21, 1957
- Country: India
- Language: Hindi

Bandi is a 1957 Indian drama and family film directed by Satyen Bose. It stars Kishore Kumar, Ashok Kumar, Shyama and Bina Rai.

== Plot ==
A much married Shankar (Ashok Kumar) works for a Zamindar and falls for his daughter Mala (Bina Rai). But the Zamindar gets him arrested for a murder. His younger brother Madhav (Kishore Kumar) takes responsibility of his wife Kamala (Shyama) and daughter Asha (teenage part played by Nanda Karnataki) but Shankar's wife passes away. Madhav brings up his daughter and arranges her marriage but the boy Dr. Madan Chaubey (Anoop Kumar) turns out to be son of the Zamindar Batuk Chaubey.

== Cast ==
- Ashok Kumar as Shankar Mishra, the main protagonist
- Kishore Kumar as Madhav Mishra (Madho), Shankar's younger brother, who is the titular character
- Nanda Karnataki as Asha Mishra Chaubey, Shankar & Kamala's daughter & Madan's wife
- Kanhaiyalal as Maheshwar Pandey, Kamala's father
- Anoop Kumar as Dr. Madan Chaubey, Asha's husband
- Shyama as Kamala Pandey Mishra, first wife of Shankar
- Bina Rai as Mala Mishra, second wife of Shankar
- S. N. Banerjee as Avinash, Mala's father
- Kammo as Champa, street singer & dancer
- Iftekhar as Ramesh Sharma, Shankar's lawyer (uncredited cameo)

== Soundtrack ==
The music was composed by Hemant Kumar. As far as lyrics are concerned, only Rajendra Krishan was credited as the lyricist of the film although Prem Dhawan and Ravi Shankar Sharma also were the lyricists of this film albeit uncredited.

Song	Singer(s)	Lyricist	Notes
"Ek Roz Hamari Bhi Daal Galegi"	Kishore Kumar	Rajendra Krishan	These songs were used in the film as well as issued on audio records of the same.
"Chup Ho Jaa Ameeron Ke Yeh Sone Ki Ghadi Hai"	Kishore Kumar	Rajendra Krishan	These songs were used in the film as well as issued on audio records of the same.
"Ghar Ki Raunaq Hai Gharwali"	Kishore Kumar & Geeta Dutt	Rajendra Krishan	These songs were used in the film as well as issued on audio records of the same.
"Gora Badan Mora Umariya Baali Mai Toh Gende Ki Daali Mohpe Tirchi Nazariya Na Dalo"	Geeta Dutt	Rajendra Krishan	These songs were used in the film as well as issued on audio records of the same.
"Ek Bade Baap Ki Beti Kal Ghar Ke Munshi Sang Dekha Gul Mil Batiya Karte"	Manna Dey & chorus	Rajendra Krishan	These songs were used in the film as well as issued on audio records of the same.
"Kaahe Sharmaye Gori Din Yeh Suhana Hai"	Asha Bhosle & chorus	Ravi Shankar Sharma (uncredited)	These songs were used in the film as well as issued on audio records of the same.
"Mere Haal Par Na Hanso Chand Taaro, Khatawaar Hu Mujhko Tane Na Maro"	Lata Mangeshkar	Prem Dhawan (uncredited)	These songs were used in the film as well as issued on audio records of the same.
"Yeh Mast Nazar Shokh Ada Kiske Liye Hai, Tum Hi Kaho"	Hemant Kumar & Geeta Dutt	Prem Dhawan (uncredited)	This song was not a part of the film but was issued on audio records of the same.
