= Jab Jab Phool Khile =

- Film poster
- Directed by: Suraj Prakash
- Written by: Brij Katyal
- Produced by: Chetan K.
- Starring: Shashi Kapoor; Nanda; Agha
- Cinematography: Taru Dutt
- Edited by: Stanley Joshua; Suraj Prakash
- Music by: Kalyanji-Anandji
- Production company: Lime Light
- Release date: 5 November 1965
- Running time: 141 minutes
- Country: India
- Language: Hindi

Jab Jab Phool Khile (transl. Whenever the Flowers Bloomed) is a 1965 Indian Hindi-language romantic drama film directed by Suraj Prakash, written by Brij Katyal and starring Shashi Kapoor and Nanda. The story is of a poor boy who is a boatman in Jammu and Kashmir and falls in love with a rich tourist. The film became a "blockbuster" at the box office, and was the second highest grossing Hindi film of 1965 according to Box Office India. The songs with music by the duo Kalyanji Anandji, assisted by then little-known Laxmikant Pyarelal, and lyrics by Anand Bakshi are a highlight of the film.

== Plot ==
Rita Khanna, only daughter and an heiress of Raj Bahadur Chunnilal goes to Jammu and Kashmir for a holiday along with her maid Stella. There, she rents a houseboat and becomes friendly with owner of that houseboat Raja. Raja was an innocent and romantic village guy who lives along with his younger sister Munni. After some misunderstandings, they grow friendly and Raja falls in love with Rita. Before starting back, Rita promises Raja that she would come back the following year.

At her home, her father wants her to marry Kishore, but Rita keeps on postponing her decision. She goes to Kashmir the following year as promised, but Kishore comes along with her, causing Raja trouble. Finally Raja professes his love and asks her to marry him. She chooses Raja over Kishore and brings him to her dad.

Raj Bahadur doesn't want his daughter to marry Raja and tries to reason with her, but fails. At last, he tells his daughter that Raja was of a completely different background and can't adjust to their ways. Rita asks Raja to change his appearance and habits and Raja agrees. After a makeover, Raj Bahadur throws a party to introduce Raja to everyone. There, Raja couldn't bear watching Rita dancing with other men. It leads to a quarrel between them and Raja leaves her house saying that he couldn't adjust to her culture.

Rita feels bad that Raja left just because of a minor fight. Then she overhears her father saying that he planned everything to separate them and he that knew way before that Raja couldn't tolerate Rita dancing with other men. Rita understands that she unnecessarily fought with Raja and decides to move to Kashmir with him. She goes to the railway station and requests Raja to take her with him. The film ends with Raja pulling Rita into a moving train and both embrace happily.

== Cast ==
- Shashi Kapoor as Raja / Rajkumar
- Nanda as Rita Khanna
- Kamal Kapoor as Raja Bahadur Chunnilal Khanna
- Shammi as Stella
- Mridula as Mrs. Khanna, Rita's Mother
- Baby Farida as Munni
- Jatin Khanna as Kishore
- Tun Tun as Mary
- Agha as Amarrnath
- Bhalla as Djun Djun
- Prayag Raj
- Shyam as Shyam kumar
- Javed

== Production ==
Brij Katyal's script was turned down by three top producers, including Sholay (1975) creator G. P. Sippy. However, director Suraj Prakash felt it was a beautiful story and accepted it. It went on to become his greatest hit and was his first colour film.

To prepare for his role as Raja, Shashi Kapoor spend days with the boatmen in Jammu and Kashmir to study their lifestyle. Sometimes, he would have meals with them. The climax, where Raja pulls Rita into the train, was shot at the Bombay Central station. Suraj Prakash gave explicit instructions on how and when to pull Nanda into the train. Kapoor followed those directions so well that there were only a few feet left for the platform to end when he pulled her in. Prakash claims the incident was so hair-raising that he'd shut his eyes, convinced that Nanda's end had come. The jeep of Chittajit Mohan Dhar (former M.P., industrialist, founder of Perfect Chemical Industries, scientist and cousin of CDRI director, Manojit Mohan Dhar) was featured in the film and he played a vital role in the production.

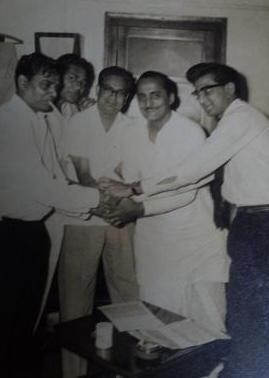
Chittajit Mohan Dhar MP, signing for Jab Jab Phool Khile with Directors

The original climax from the script had Raja beating up the bad guys. However, Suraj Prakash rejected it, and after an afternoon watching Love in the Afternoon (1957), he settled with Rita leaving everything behind to go back to Kashmir with Raja.

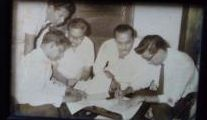
Chittajit Mohan Dhar signing for Jab Jab Phool Khile with the other producers including Mr. Sethia

The character of Rita (Nanda) is spotted reading Lolita in the houseboat at the time of teaching the Devanagari alphabet to Raja (Shashi Kapoor).

== Soundtrack ==
All lyrics are written by Anand Bakshi; all music is composed by Kalyanji-Anandji.

Songs
| No. | Title | Playback | Length |
|---|---|---|---|
| 1. | "Affoo Khudaya" | Mohammed Rafi |
| 2. | "Ek Tha Gul Aur Ek Thi Bulbul" | Mohammed Rafi, Nanda |
| 3. | "Main Jo Chali Hindustan Se" | Lata Mangeshkar |
| 4. | "Na Na Karte Pyar Tumhin Se" | Mohammed Rafi, Suman Kalyanpur |
| 5. | "Pardesiyon Se Na Ankhiyan Milana" | Lata Mangeshkar |
| 6. | "Pardesiyon Se Na Ankhiyan Milana" (Happy) | Mohammed Rafi |
| 7. | "Pardesiyon Se Na Ankhiyan Milana" (Sad) | Mohammed Rafi |
| 8. | "Yahan Main Ajnabi Hoon" | Mohammed Rafi |
| 9. | "Ye Samaa Samaa Hai Pyar Ka" | Lata Mangeshkar |

According to film and music expert Rajesh Subramanian, it was writer – actor Prayag Raj who sang the refrains affū khudā in the song "Affoo Khudaya". Lyricist Anand Bakshi's career took off after this film.

== Legacy ==
The film was screened in Algeria's cinema halls every two days for a couple of years; there had been public demand for it. Shashi Kapoor was one of the most successful Indian actors in North African countries such as Algeria, Morocco, and Libya.
