= Mazdoor =

1983 Bollywood film

- Poster
- Directed by: Ravi Chopra
- Produced by: B. R. Chopra
- Starring: Dilip Kumar; Nanda; Raj Babbar; Nazir Hussain; Rati Agnihotri; Padmini Kolhapure
- Music by: R. D. Burman
- Distributed by: B. R. Films
- Release date: October 14, 1983
- Country: India
- Language: Hindi

Mazdoor (Worker) is a 1983 Bollywood film. Produced by B. R. Chopra, it was directed by his son Ravi Chopra. The film stars Dilip Kumar, Nanda, Raj Babbar, Suresh Oberoi, Rati Agnihotri, Padmini Kolhapure, Iftekhar, Madan Puri, and Johnny Walker. The music of the film was composed by R. D. Burman. This was veteran actress Nanda's final appearance before her retirement from acting.

== Plot ==
The son of Mr. Sinha changes everything in order to maximize profits. This brings him into conflict with his employees including Dinanath Saxena. When Dinanath openly confronts Hiralal in a public meeting, Hiralal wants him to tender a written apology, but Dinanath instead resigns and decides to open his very own mill with the help of a struggling Engineer, Ashok Mathur. They do eventually succeed, go into production, hire employees, and soon earn a good reputation. Dinanath gets his daughter, Meena, married to Ashok, who becomes a ghar jamai, much to the chagrin of Smita, the daughter of multi-millionaire Kundanlal Batra, who had expected Ashok to marry her. She soon concocts a scheme to bring discord in the Mathur family, and also ensure Ashok's ruin.

== Cast ==
- Dilip Kumar as Dinanath Saxena
- Nanda as Radha Saxena
- Raj Babbar as Ashok Mathur
- Padmini Kolhapure as Meena Saxena
- Rati Agnihotri as Smita Batra
- Raj Kiran as Ramesh Saxena
- Suresh Oberoi as Heeralal Sinha
- Madan Puri as Daulatram
- Johnny Walker as Govinda
- Iftekhar as Kundanlal Batra
- Nazir Hussain as Mr. Sinha
- Jagdish Raj as Bank Manager Tiwari

== Soundtrack ==
Mazdoor

Soundtrack album by R.D. Burman
- Recorded: 1983
- Genre: Film soundtrack
- Length: 33:20
- Label: Saregama Music

The songs are composed by R.D. Burman. The lyrics are written by Hasan Kamal. The album consists of seven songs.

Track listing
No.	Title	Singer(s)	Length
1.	"Hum Mehnatkash Is Duniya Se"	Mahendra Kapoor	04:44
2.	"Naach Uthi (Not in the film)"	Asha Bhosle	03:56
3.	"Pet Mein Roti, Tan Par Kapda"	Mahendra Kapoor, Chandrashekhar Gadgil	05:17
4.	"Tumhe Bhool Jaane Ka Haq Hai"	Asha Bhosle	04:56
5.	"Nana Ho Gaya Diwana"	Mahendra Kapoor, Hariharan	06:15
6.	"Pahla Pahla Pyaar"	Salma Agha	03:59
7.	"Baat Adhoori Kyu Hai"	Asha Bhosle	04:13
Total length:			33:20
