= Raja Saab =

- Directed by: Suraj Prakash
- Starring: Shashi Kapoor; Nanda
- Music by: Kalyanji Anandji
- Production company: Lime Light
- Distributed by: Associated Films & Finance Corporation
- Release date: 24 October 1969
- Country: India
- Language: Hindi

Raja Saab is a 1969 Bollywood drama film directed by Suraj Prakash under the banner of Limelight. It stars Shashi Kapoor and Nanda in pivotal roles.

== Plot ==
Born and brought up in an orphanage, Raju dreams of living life King-size. On being forced by his employer, Prince Pratap Singh, he impersonates him in front of Princess Poonam. Soon he falls in love with her, and after initial hesitation, Poonam too starts liking him. But will Poonam keep loving him after realizing that he is not a royal prince but merely a pauper?

== Cast ==
- Shashi Kapoor as Raju
- Nanda as Poonam
- Rajendra Nath as Pratap Singh
- Kamal Kapoor as Poonam's uncle
- Azra as D'Mello as Waiter
- Agha as Hameshbahar's dad
- Shammi as Malti (Poonam's Secretary)
- Kumari Naaz as Hameshbahar

== Music ==
1. "Humne Aaj Se Tumhe Ye Naam De Diya, Jaaneman" - Lata Mangeshkar, Mohammed Rafi
2. "Tu Jungle Ki Morni, Te Mai Bhaga Da Mor" - Mohammed Rafi, Suman Kalyanpur
3. "Raju Ka Hai Ek Khwab, Raju Raja Raja Saab" - Mohammed Rafi
4. "Raju Ka Tha Ek Khwab, Raju Raja Raja Saab" - Mohammed Rafi
5. "Sajna Ke Tere Bin Sajna" - Lata Mangeshkar
6. "Jinki Kismat Me Kante Vo Khwab Na Dekhe Kaliyo Ke" - Mohammed Rafi
7. "Kal Raat Vaali Mulaakaat Ke Liye, Maaf Kijie" - Mohammed Rafi
8. "Kisi Meharbaan Ki Nazar Dhundte Hai" - Mohammed Rafi

== See also ==
- The Prince and the Pauper
