= Zameer (1975 film) =

- Movie poster
- Directed by: Ravi Chopra
- Screenplay by: B. R. Films story Department; Akhtar ul Iman (dialogue)
- Story by: C. J. Pavri
- Produced by: B. R. Chopra
- Starring: Shammi Kapoor; Saira Banu; Amitabh Bachchan
- Cinematography: Dharam Chopra
- Edited by: Pran Mehra
- Music by: Sapan Chakraborty
- Distributed by: B. R. Films
- Release date: 21 March 1975
- Country: India
- Language: Hindi

Zameer (transl. Conscience) is a 1975 Hindi action-drama film directed by Ravi Chopra in his directorial debut and produced by B. R. Chopra for B. R. Films. It stars Shammi Kapoor, Saira Banu, Amitabh Bachchan, Madan Puri and Vinod Khanna in a special appearance. The music for the film was composed by Sapan Chakraborty. All the songs of the movie were super hit. The film is based on O. Henry's short story A Double-Dyed Deceiver which was earlier adapted in 1960 as Bombai Ka Babu starring Dev Anand.

The film was commercially successful.

== Plot ==
Maharaj Singh is a proud owner of several derby-winning stallions, and lives in a palatial farmhouse with his wife, Rukmini and young son, Chimpoo. One day dacoits attack his farmhouse with a view of stealing the stallions, but Maharaj fights them, killing the son of the leader of the dacoits, Maan Singh. Maan Singh swears to avenge the death of his son, and abducts Chimpoo. Years later, a servant of Maharaj, Ram Singh, brings a young man named Badal into the Singhs lives, and tells them that he is their missing son Chimpoo. Both Maharaj, Rukmini, and their daughter, Sunita, are delighted at having Chimpoo back in their lives. Then Badal and Sunita fall in love with each other. It is then Badal confesses to Maharaj that he is not Chimpoo, but a former convicted jailbird, who was asked to impersonate him by an embittered Ram Singh. Maharaj does not want to relay this information to an ailing Rukmini, and decides to keep it quiet for the rest of their lives. But sooner or later Rukmini is bound to find out - especially when Badal and Sunita openly show their love - will this shock of an intimate brother and a sister spare her or has fate something else in store for her?

== Cast ==
- Shammi Kapoor as Thakur Maharaj Singh
- Saira Banu as Smita Singh
- Amitabh Bachchan as Badal Singh / Fake Chimpoo Singh
- Madan Puri as Daaku Maan Singh
- Vinod Khanna as Suraj "Chimpoo" Singh, Daaku Maan Singh's adoptive son & Thakur Maharaj Singh's biological son (Special Appearance)
- Indrani Mukherjee as Rukmini Singh, Thakur Maharaj Singh's wife
- Ramesh Deo as Ramu (Servant of Thakur Maharaj Singh)
- Jagdish Raj as Sheru

== Reception ==
Vijay Lokapally, in his review for The Hindu wrote "There was little in the movie to remember. The dialogues were ordinary and less said about the acting the better. Everyone, with the exception of Madan Puri, just about went through the motions. Shammi Kapoor was disappointing as the garrulous stud farm owner.It was certainly not among the best films of Amitabh Bachchan. Or even Vinod Khanna. Yet, it is listed a hit."

== Soundtrack ==
All music for the film was composed by Sapan Chakraborty, and all the songs are written by Sahir Ludhianvi and Rajkavi Inderjeet Singh Tulsi.

#	Title	Singer(s)	Lyricist(s)
1	"Zindagi Hansne Gane Ke Liye Hai"	Kishore Kumar	Sahir Ludhianvi
2	"Phoolon Ke Dere Hai"	Kishore Kumar	Sahir Ludhianvi
3	"Tum Bhi Chalo Hum Bhi Chale (Duet)"	Kishore Kumar, Asha Bhosle	Sahir Ludhianvi
4	"Bade Dinon Men Khushi Ka Din Aaya"	Mahendra Kapoor	Sahir Ludhianvi
5	"Tum Bhi Chalo (Male)"	Kishore Kumar	Sahir Ludhianvi
6	"Aanka Baanka Tali Talaka"	Kishore Kumar, Manna Dey	Rajkavi Inderjeet Singh Tulsi
7	"Ab Yahan Koi Nahin"	Kishore Kumar	Sahir Ludhianvi
