= The Train (1970 film) =

- Poster
- Directed by: Ravikant Nagaich
- Written by: Raj Baldev Raj; Arudra
- Based on: Cochin Express (1967)
- Produced by: Rajendra Kumar; Ramesh Behl
- Starring: Rajesh Khanna; Nanda
- Cinematography: Ravikant Nagaich
- Edited by: Nand Kumar
- Music by: R. D. Burman
- Production company: Rose Movies
- Release date: 10 April 1970
- Country: India
- Language: Hindi
- Box office: ₹2.10 crore (equivalent to ₹104 crore or US$11 million in 2023)

The Train is a 1970 Indian Hindi-language thriller film starring Rajesh Khanna, Nanda. It is a remake of the 1967 Malayalam film Cochin Express.

The film is counted among the 17 consecutive hit films of Rajesh Khanna between 1969 and 1971, by adding the two-hero films Marayada and Andaz to the 15 consecutive solo hits he gave from 1969 to 1971.

== Plot ==
Khanna stars as Police Inspector Shyam Kumar, who sets out to solve a series of murders which have all taken place on a train. Complicating the situation are his girlfriend Neeta, who has been acting mysteriously ever since she began her new job, and hotel dancer Miss Lily, who tries to seduce the good police inspector, but may find that she loses her heart instead.

== Cast ==
- Rajesh Khanna as CID Inspector Shyam Kumar
- Nanda as Neeta / Geeta
- Helen as Lily
- Rajendra Nath as Pyarelal
- Iftekhar As Police Commissioner
- Madan Puri as Yogi / No. 1
- M. B. Shetty as Shetty
- Mumtaz Begum as Neeta's Mother
- Chaman Puri as Neeta's father Ramdev
- Sunder as Hiralal jeweller
- Ranveer Raj as Inspector Kapoor
- Mamaji as Stationmaster
- Randhir as Peshomal Lodhani Diamond dealer
- Gurnam Singh as the waiter
- Chinu Rajput as the Male dancer in song "O Meri Jaan Maine Kahan"
- Harbans Darshan M. Arora as Inspector in Nasik police station
- Aruna Irani as dancer in song "Saiyan Re Saiyan"
- Shammi as Geeta the matron of girls' hostel
- Rajpal as Anokhe Lal (The Boss)

== Production ==
The Train was co-produced by Rajendra Kumar and it was Nanda who suggested to Rajendra to cast Rajesh Khanna in the main lead.

== Soundtrack ==
The lyrics were written by Anand Bakshi.

Song	Singer
"Gulabi Aankhen"	Mohammed Rafi
"Ni Soniye"	Lata Mangeshkar, Mohammed Rafi
"Kis Liye Maine"	Lata Mangeshkar
"O Meri Jaan"	Asha Bhosle, R. D. Burman
"Chhaiyan Re"	Asha Bhosle
"Maine Dil Abhi"	Asha Bhosle

== Reception ==
The Train was recorded as a "Hit" at Box Office India.
