= Insaf Ka Tarazu =

1980 Bollywood revenge drama film

- Promotional poster
- Directed by: B. R. Chopra
- Written by: Shabdkumar
- Produced by: B. R. Chopra
- Starring: Raj Babbar; Zeenat Aman; Padmini Kohlapure; Deepak Parashar
- Cinematography: Dharam Chopra
- Edited by: S. B. Mane
- Music by: Ravindra Jain
- Release date: 11 November 1980
- Country: India
- Language: Hindi

Insaf Ka Tarazu (transl. The Scale of Justice) is a 1980 Hindi drama film produced and directed by B. R. Chopra. The film stars Zeenat Aman, Raj Babbar, Deepak Parashar, Padmini Kolhapure, Iftekhar, Simi Garewal, Shreeram Lagoo, and Dharmendra in a Cameo. The music of the film was composed by Ravindra Jain. It is a remake of the American film Lipstick (1976 film), starring real-life sisters Margaux Hemingway and Mariel Hemingway playing as sisters in the film. The film was remade later in Telugu as Edi Dharmam Edi Nyayam? (1982), and in Tamil as Neethi Devan Mayakkam. The film became a box office success upon release.

== Plot ==
Bharti is a beautiful model, who is soon to marry Ashok.She gets raped by Ramesh so she approaches court. However, she is not able to get justice. Due to shame, she moves to Pune where she takes job in a weapons store and her sister Neeta enrolls in a typing course. Neeta is raped by Ramesh so Bharti kills him. Bharti gives a stirring speech in court which forces judge to give her a light sentence and resign due to miscarriage of justice in the past.

== Cast ==
- Zeenat Aman as Bharti Saxena
- Raj Babbar as Ramesh Gupta
- Deepak Parashar as Ashok Sharma
- Padmini Kolhapure as Neeta Saxena
- Shreeram Lagoo as Lawyer Chandra
- Iftekhar as Judge
- Simi Garewal as Bharti Saxena's lawyer
- Jagdish Raj as Police Officer
- Om Shivpuri as Ashok Sharma's father
- Yunus Parvez as Store owner
- Dharmendra as Soldier Anil Dev Maini (Cameo)

== Soundtrack ==
The film features four songs all written by Sahir Ludhianvi, by playback singers Asha Bhosle, Mahendra Kapoor and Hemlata.

| Song | Singer |
|---|---|
| "Log Aurat Ko" | Asha Bhosle |
| "Hazaar Khwab Haqeeqat Ke Roop" | Asha Bhosle, Mahendra Kapoor |
| "Hai Jo Yahi Pyar Ka Trailor" | Asha Bhosle, Mahendra Kapoor, Hemlata |
| "Insaaf Ka Tarazu" Theme Song | Mahendra Kapoor |

== Awards and nominations ==
28th Filmfare Awards:

Won

- Best Supporting Actress – Padmini Kolhapure
- Best Dialogue – Shabd Kumar
- Best Editing – S. B. Mane

Nominated

- Best Film – B. R. Chopra
- Best Director – B. R. Chopra
- Best Actress – Zeenat Aman
- Best Actor – Raj Babbar
- Best Supporting Actor – Shriram Lagoo
- Best Story – Shabd Kumar
