= Kanoon =

- Film poster
- Directed by: B. R. Chopra
- Written by: Akhtar-Ul-Iman; C. J. Pavri
- Produced by: B. R. Chopra
- Starring: Rajendra Kumar; Ashok Kumar; Nanda; Mehmood
- Cinematography: M. N. Malhotra
- Edited by: Pran Mehra; Ramlal; Krishnan Sachdeva
- Music by: Salil Chowdhury
- Release date: 1960
- Running time: 139 min.
- Country: India
- Language: Hindi

Kanoon (transl. Law) is a 1960 Indian Hindi-language courtroom drama film directed by B. R. Chopra. The film presents a case against capital punishment, arguing that witnesses may be genuinely deceived, and their consequent inadvertently tendered false testimony may lead someone wrongly to be convicted and hanged. Kanoon stars Rajendra Kumar, Nanda, Ashok Kumar, Mehmood, Shashikala, Jeevan and Om Prakash.

The film was a courtroom drama related with a murder case, where the judge's prospective son-in-law (Rajendra Kumar) is the defence lawyer in a case of murder, for which he suspects his would-be father-in-law. The film was the second songless Hindi talkie. The first one was Naujawan, made in 1937. The movie features an innovative Indo-Western ballet performance with instrumental music by music director Salil Chowdhury.

Kanoon has thematic similarities with the 1957 American film Witness for the Prosecution, itself based on an Agatha Christie play by Agatha Christie. More controversially, it has been noted that it wasn't submitted to the Oscars as India's official nomination considering that "the judges were afraid [Kanoon] would have been taken for an imitation of Witness for the Prosecution."

== Plot synopsis ==
Kalidas (Jeevan) is presented before court for the murder of Ganpat. He pleads guilty, but claims that the court can do him no harm, as he has already served a sentence for the murder of the same man. An emotionally overcharged Kalidas asks judge Badri Prasad (Ashok Kumar) what gives law the right to deprive an innocent man of something it cannot return him, before collapsing and dying.

The shocking incident makes its way to the press and becomes a matter of hot debate in the city. Two judges, Mr. Jha and Mr. Savalkar (Iftekhar in a guest appearance), discuss the case. Badri Prasad, who is well known for never having awarded a death sentence, has a friendly argument with Jha, which leads to a wager that it is possible for someone to get away scot-free with murder.

In the meantime, romance is blossoming between Badri Prasad's daughter Meena (Nanda) and advocate Kailash Khanna (Rajendra Kumar), one of the rising stars in the legal fraternity, and Badri Prasad's protégé. The young couple's visit to the ballet is rather unremarkable, except for the surreptitious appearance of Ashok Kumar, who is seen by the viewer romancing an unknown lady (Shashikala) in a private box. Incidentally, the murdered man Ganpat is her husband. She married a rich man during her first husband's (Ganpat) lifetime and inherited his property. This was an illegal marriage, and Dhaniram was blackmailing her, as he was privy to this information.

Badri Prasad's son Vijay (Mehmood) is heavily indebted to Dhaniram (Om Prakash) a local money lender who, having obtained the former's signature on a blank piece of paper, threatens to have his entire property confiscated. Afraid to face his stern father with the truth, Vijay pleads with Kailash to intercede with the moneylender. The latter agrees to do so, despite initial reluctance.

Kailash drops in at the money lender's place to have a word with him. Their exchange is interrupted by the arrival of Badri Prasad's look-alike. Kailash does not want to be seen with Dhaniram, so he hides in a side room, instructing Dhaniram not to disclose to the judge that he had come there.

Dhaniram receives the unexpected guest through an already open door. Kailash watches in horror from the inner room, as the unscheduled visitor (Ashok Kumar) stabs his host to death. Unsure of what to do, Kailash walks away. Unfortunately, a petty thief, Kaalia (Nana Palsikar), who comes in with the intention of burglary, is apprehended at the scene of the crime and presented in Badri Prasad's court. He is shown being caught by Sub-Inspector Das (Jagdish Raj) and Hawaldar Ram Singh. Kaalia's hands are completely drenched in blood.

Torn between his loyalty to his mentor and future father-in-law, on the one hand, and his moral duty to save an innocent man, on the other, Kailash resolves to defend the accused, while at the same time, avoiding bringing out in public the painful truth. What ensues is an absorbing psychological thriller with an unexpected end.

== Cast ==
- Ashok Kumar as Judge Badri Prasad
- Rajendra Kumar as Advocate Kailash Khanna
- Nanda as Meena Prasad, Badri Prasad's daughter
- Mehmood as Vijay Prasad, Badri Prasad's son
- Manmohan Krishna as Prosecuting Attorney
- Jagdish Raj as Sub-Inspector Das
- Jeevan as Kalidas
- Nana Palsikar as Kaalia
- Iftekhar as Judge Savalkar
- Om Prakash as Dhaniram
- Moolchand as Advocate
- Nazir Kashmiri as a jury member
- Shashikala
- Shubha Khote as stage announcer
- Gopi Krishna (dancer) as Male dancer in stage show
- Leela Chitnis as Kalidas's wife
- Balwant Singh
- Dewan Sharar as Judge Jha
- Kailash Sharma
- Ravi Kant
- Tina Misquitta as Tina Katkar
- Harbans Darshan M. Arora as advocate.

== Trivia ==
- The year of Dhaniram's (Om Prakash) death is not mentioned in the film, but it can be derived from the contents of the film. He may have been murdered on the night of 30 June 1959. This is because on the next day of the murder, when Badri Prasad's daughter Meena (Nanda), is serving breakfast to her father, the radio announces in Hindi in the background – "Aaj Budhwar hai aur July ki pehli Taarikh" [Today is Wednesday, and the first of July]. The film was made in 1960. Before this year, 1959 is the nearest year, where Wednesday falls on 1 July.
- The wager between Badri Prasad (Ashok Kumar) and Justice Jha, that it is possible to murder someone without being sentenced, occurs only 2 days earlier – on 28 June. When Kailash Khanna, towards the end of the film, presents Badri Prasad's diary to the court, he mentions this date.
- In Indian Courts, a person whose true identity is unknown or must be withheld in a legal action is called Ashok Kumar. The reason for this is actor Ashok Kumar's character in this movie.

== Awards and nominations ==
Year	Nominee / work	Award	Result
1960	B. R. Chopra	National Film Award for Best Feature Film in Hindi; Certificate of Merit	Won
1962	B. R. Chopra	Filmfare Award for Best Director	Won
1962	Nana Palsikar	Filmfare Best Supporting Actor Award	Won
1962	C.J. Pavri	Filmfare Award for Best Story	Nominated
1962	B. R. Chopra (for B. R Films)	Filmfare Award for Best Film	Nominated
