= Dastaan (1972 film) =

- Poster
- Directed by: B. R. Chopra
- Produced by: B. R. Chopra
- Starring: Dilip Kumar; Sharmila Tagore; Bindu; Prem Chopra; I. S. Johar
- Cinematography: Dharam Chopra
- Edited by: Pran Mehra
- Music by: Laxmikant–Pyarelal; Lyrics; Sahir Ludhianvi
- Release date: 3 March 1972
- Country: India
- Language: Hindi

Dastaan (lit. 'The Tale') is a 1972 thriller film produced and directed by B. R. Chopra. The film stars Dilip Kumar, Sharmila Tagore, Bindu, Prem Chopra, Iftekhar, I. S. Johar and Madan Puri. The film's music is by Laxmikant-Pyarelal. Dastaan was a commercial failure and Dilip Kumar's first outright flop in 6 years since Dil Diya Dard Liya (1966). This movie is based on director's own 1951 film named Afsana, starring Ashok Kumar in leading role.

== Plot ==
Anil and Sunil are identical twin brothers. They have a friend named Meena who likes Sunil. As a child, Sunil gets separated from his family in a fair, due to heavy storm. None of the trio remembers the incident. Sunil has lost his memory, found by a man named Sahay, who renames him Vishnu.

Vishnu Sahay grows up to become a reputed Judge. He has everything, money, fame, happiness and a seemingly devoted wife Mala. However, he is blissfully unaware that Mala and his best friend Rajan are having an affair behind his back. Meanwhile, Anil has grown into a Don Juan. He is involved with a dancer and also flirts with Meena, who, however, wants nothing to do with him and still in love with Sunil.

One day, Anil accidentally kills a man and runs to Mussoorie to hide from the cops. Judge Vishnu Sahay comes to the same hotel as Anil. When Anil sees Vishnu, he observes that they are lookalike. If Vishnu's facial hair and spectacles are removed, even the police will have a hard time distinguishing between him and Anil. Vishnu does not realize this. Anil spikes Vishnu's coffee and knocks him out. After removing Vishnu's facial hair and glasses, he checks out of the hotel as Vishnu. However, his plan turns out to be disastrous as Vishnu's car suffers an accident, killing Anil on the spot.

From the look of things, the police assume that Vishnu has died. Meanwhile, the real Vishnu is taken into custody as Anil after he gets up. He is, however, proved innocent in court. He sets out for home, expecting to surprise his wife. However, he is shocked to see that his wife and friend are celebrating his death. He learns of their adultery and leaves distraught and dejected. Mala and Rajan are unaware of his return, because they believe that Vishnu is not in the world now.

Vishnu comes back to Anil's house. Meena recognizes that he is in fact Sunil, but he cannot remember anything. She is perplexed as to why he is not responding to her. Vishnu re-enters the lives of his wife and her lover as Anil and befriends them. One day, he invites them to see a play staged by himself. Mala goes with Meena to watch the play where Rajan arrives at Anil's place to kill him for ruining his business. There he realizes the truth about Anil's identity as Vishnu reprimands him for being an unfaithful friend. Rajan realizes his mistake and asks for forgiveness from Vishnu who forgives him. Rajan leaves with guilt but falls to his death from the stairs. Mala, who is watching the play realizes everything and walks out of the play in horror. Vishnu follows her to his home, only to find Mala sitting calmly in a chair. He asks her to choose between death and the ignominy of living the rest of her life as an unfaithful wife. She says that she is guilty and no other woman like Mala should be born ever. She says that she has already made a choice and shows an empty poison bottle in her hand. She dies in front of Vishnu. Just then, a sad Meena comes from behind him and places a hand on his shoulder, indicating that she knows everything now.

== Cast ==
- Dilip Kumar ... Diwan Anil Kumar / Sunil Kumar / Vishnu Sahay (Dual Role)
- Sharmila Tagore ... Meena
- Bindu ... Mala
- Prem Chopra ... Rajan
- I. S. Johar ... Birbal
- Padma Khanna ... Padma
- Madan Puri ... Public Procecutor In Anil Kumar's Case (Special Appearance)
- Sachin Pilgaonkar ... Young Sunil and Anil
- Jayashree T ... Dancer
- Manmohan krishna ... Meena's father
- Gopikrishna... Balloon seller in fair

== Soundtrack ==
The lyrics of the songs were penned by Sahir Ludhianvi.

Song	Singer
"Na Tu Zameen Ke Liye Hai"	Mohammed Rafi
"O Mela, Jagwala, Saathi Mere, Chalta Rahe"	Mahendra Kapoor
"Maria My Sweetheart"	Mahendra Kapoor, Asha Bhosle
"Woh Koi Aaya, Lachak Uthi Kaaya"	Asha Bhosle
"O Haay, Main Ki Kara"	Asha Bhosle
