= Ittefaq (1969 film) =

1969 Indian film by Yash Chopra

- Promotional poster
- Directed by: Yash Chopra
- Written by: G. R. Kamath (story and screenplay); Akhtar ul Iman (dialogues)
- Produced by: B. R. Chopra
- Starring: Nanda; Rajesh Khanna
- Cinematography: K. G. Koregaonkar
- Music by: Salil Chowdhury
- Release date: 10 October 1969
- Running time: 105 minutes
- Country: India
- Language: Hindi

Ittefaq (English: Coincidence) is a 1969 Indian mystery thriller film produced by B. R. Chopra and directed by his brother Yash Chopra. The film stars Nanda and Rajesh Khanna in the lead with Sujit Kumar, Bindu, Madan Puri and Iftekhar playing supporting roles and has music by Salil Chowdhury. It is based on the 1965 American film Signpost to Murder (an adaptation of a 1962 play of the same name by Monte Doyle), which had earlier been remade into a Gujarati play Dhummas starring Sarita Joshi.

It was the third Bollywood film (after Munna and Kanoon) that did not have any songs in it. What was remarkable was that a previous production from the same production house, i.e. B. R. Films, namely Kanoon, made in 1960, was also a song-less film and with the same leading lady Nanda. Another common feature of both Kanoon and Ittefaq was that in both these song-less films Salil Chowdhary was the music director. This was also the first Hindi film that did not have any interval.

This film is counted among the 17 consecutive hit films starring Rajesh Khanna in a lead role between 1969 and 1971, by including the two multi-starrer films Maryada and Andaz to the 15 consecutive solo hits he gave from 1969 to 1971. This is also the last film Yash Chopra would direct for his brother before branching out to form his own production company Yash Raj Films.

== Plot ==
Dilip Roy (Rajesh Khanna) is a painter and is married to a rich woman, Sushma. One day while he is passionately painting, his wife asks him to go out with her. He refuses and in the ensuing struggle she destroys his painting. Dilip gets emotionally upset and shoves her, saying that he would kill her and leaves the house. When he comes back, his wife is dead and the police arrest him as the prime suspect on the testimony of Renu (Bindu), his wife's sister who lives with them. He claims that though he became enraged and can't remember what happened, he didn't kill her.

Later, he is sent for psychological analysis on account of his erratic behaviour during the trial. There, Dr. Trivedi (Gajanan Jagirdar), a psychologist examines him and decides to keep him in the hospital for some more time. On a stormy night, Dilip escapes and ends up at Rekha's (Nanda) house. Rekha is a married woman staying in a rich neighborhood, and her husband isn't home at that time. Dilip holds her at gunpoint and demands her to hide him from the police. She tries to call someone, but fails. When police come inquiring, she is forced to hide the fact that Dilip is there. Later, after some talk, Dilip asks her for forgiveness and they talk for some time. He changes from his prison uniform.

Dilip, believing that Rekha wouldn't call the police, sleeps for some time. When he wakes up at midnight after hearing a sound, he can't find Rekha. He searches for her, but finds the body of a young man in the bathroom. He demands an explanation from Rekha about the body, which is no longer there. Rekha tells him that everything was his imagination, but he suspects that Rekha is hiding something.

Later, after becoming sure of Rekha's deception, he calls the police and tells them that he found Mr. Jagmohan's (Rekha's husband) body in that house and that Rekha has killed her husband. But Rekha says that her husband hasn't returned from Calcutta yet. After some searching, they find Jagmohan's body outside and suspect that Dilip has killed him before entering the house. Moreover, they find Dilip's prisoner number cloth piece from his prison dress stuck with pin in Jagmohan's hands. Dilip tries to reason with them and suspects inspector Diwan (Sujit Kumar) is helping Rekha. He proves this with the help of his cigarette lighter unintenally taken by the inspector in one of his previous visits to Rekha's house. Whereas the inspector had previously denied any such visit or acquaintance with Rekha. Seeing no other way out Rekha admits that she was having an affair with the inspector, and that her husband was murdered by them as he walked in on them. She kills herself out of guilt and remorse. At the same time, Inspector Karwe (Iftekhar) finds, with the help of a piece of Renu's bracelet in Dilip's colour palette and fingerprinting, that Renu is the real killer of Dilip's wife and he clears Dilip of murder charge.

== Cast ==
- Rajesh Khanna as Dilip Roy
- Nanda as Rekha
- Bindu as Renu
- Sujit Kumar as Inspector Diwan
- Madan Puri as Public Prosecutor Khanna
- Gajanan Jagirdar as Dr. Trivedi
- Iftekhar as Inspector Karwe
- Jagdish Raj as Inspector Khan
- Shammi as Basanti
- Alka as Sushma Roy

== Awards and nominations ==
| Year | Award | Category | Recipient | Result |
|---|---|---|---|---|
| 1970 | Filmfare Awards | Best Director | Yash Chopra | Won |
| 1970 | Filmfare Awards | Best Actor | Rajesh Khanna | Nominated |
| 1970 | Filmfare Awards | Best Actress | Nanda | Nominated |
| 1970 | Filmfare Awards | Best Supporting Actress | Bindu | Nominated |
| 1970 | Filmfare Awards | Best Sound | M.A.Shaikh | Won |

== Remake ==
The film inspired the 2017 film with the same name starring Sidharth Malhotra, Sonakshi Sinha, and Akshaye Khanna. The film released on 3 November 2017.

== See also ==
- Rashomon effect
- List of Indian films without songs
