= Dhund (1973 film) =

Hindi thriller film

- Directed by: B. R. Chopra
- Written by: Akhtar-Ul-Iman
- Produced by: B. R. Chopra
- Starring: Sanjay Khan; Zeenat Aman; Danny Denzongpa; Ashok Kumar; Naveen Nischol; Madan Puri
- Cinematography: Dharam Chopra
- Edited by: Pran Mehra
- Music by: Ravi
- Release date: 13 February 1973 (India)
- Running time: 130 minutes
- Language: Hindi

Dhund (Note: The word translates as fog or mist in Hindi. Mist represents mystery, and many thriller/mystery films are named Dhund or Kohra (another Hindi word for fog or mist). Examples are Dhund (2003), Kohra (1964) and Kohra (1993). A 2023, Punjabi mystery series on Netflix has been released with a variant spelling Kohrra) is a 1973 Hindi thriller movie produced and directed by B. R. Chopra. It stars Sanjay Khan, Zeenat Aman, Danny Denzongpa, Deven Verma, Madan Puri, Navin Nischol and Ashok Kumar. The music is by Ravi. The plot is inspired by Agatha Christie's 1958 play, The Unexpected Guest.

== Plot ==
On a foggy night, Chandrashekhar, who is driving his car at high speed, meets with an accident. He walks to a nearby house to ask for assistance. When nobody answers the door, he enters the house and finds the dead body of a wheelchair-using man. Standing nearby is a beautiful, young woman, Rani, with a gun. She tells him that the dead man is her husband and she has murdered him. She asks Chandrashekhar to call the police. Intrigued, Chandrashekhar asks Rani to tell her what happened. She tells him that her husband, Thakur Ranjit Singh, was a cruel man who used to mistreat his family and used to shoot cats and dogs with his gun for amusement (which is why nobody in the house woke up upon hearing the gunshot). On this night, before Chandrashekhar arrived, they had an argument and when her husband threatened to shoot her, she tried to take the gun away from him. In the ensuing struggle, Ranjit got shot.

Since the murder is an accidental death and was done in self-defense, Chandrashekhar decides to help Rani. Together, they fake a robbery so that Ranjit's death appears to be a case of a theft gone wrong and more importantly, to suggest that the murder happened at a different time and give Rani an alibi. When the police arrive, Chandrashekhar tells them that he had bumped into a man who had just come out of the house. The man had dropped a gun, which Chandrashekhar hands over to the police. Because it was a foggy night, he says he cannot identify the man.

The police start investigating the murder and become convinced that it was committed by an insider as the "thief" seems to know his way around the house. Some of the important evidence they find at the crime scene is the dead man's pocket watch, an empty cigar container, and a tea tray which has fingerprints of an unknown person. Police soon find out that the cigar container and fingerprints belong to Suresh Saxena, a prominent lawyer and a friend of the family. Investigation reveals that Suresh was having an affair with Rani. Suresh denies being at the house on the night of the murder and claims to have been at a party that he had thrown. But upon enquiring, the police find out that Suresh had received a phone call from a woman and had subsequently left the party for about an hour. The police inspector shows Suresh's photograph to Chandrashekhar and ask him if Suresh was the man he had run into that night. But Chandrashekhar sticks to his story and says that he cannot positively identify the person.

Chandrashekhar tells Rani that the police think that Suresh committed the murder. Rani tells him how she first met Suresh when he stopped her from throwing herself off a cliff. Suresh had befriended Ranjit and had become a regular visitor to their house. Rani and Suresh had fallen in love but their romance was discovered by Ranjit. On the night of the murder, Ranjit got into a furious argument with Rani and threatened to destroy Suresh's budding political career by exposing his affair with a married woman. Rani calls Suresh at his party to warn him. Later that night, when she was taking a shower, she heard Suresh and her husband arguing with each other. By the time, Rani came out of the shower, the argument had ended. But a few minutes later, she again heard her husband shout at someone. But the noise of an airplane flying overhead drowned out all voices. By the time, she reached downstairs, Suresh had left. She confronted her husband and in the ensuring struggle, shot him. It is at this point that Chandrashekhar had walked in.

The police arrest Suresh and charge him with the murder. At the trial, the public prosecutor explains that the love affair between Suresh and Rani was the motive for the murder. The prosecutor tells the court that Suresh was present in the house at the time of the murder (the phone call and his disappearance from the party for an hour, during which the crime was committed). The prosecutor also establishes that the murder was committed long before Chandrashekhar walked into the house. He presents the dead man's pocket watch as evidence; the watch had stopped working when the fatal bullet hit it and therefore, reveals the actual time of murder. A second bullet was fired to mislead the rest of the household about the time of the murder. As the evidence mounts against Suresh, Rani panics and confesses to the murder. She asks the court to bring back Chandrashekhar to the stand so that he can tell the true story. The court is adjourned until next day. That night Chandrashekhar is visited by a nun.

As though as the consequence of it the truth is revealed next day in the court. Chandrashekar is in court to give his testimony and collaborate Rani's story, that she killed Ranjit. The nun is also present. It is revealed that Chandrashekar knew Ranjit from before. They used to be friends and in business together. Chandrashekar fell in love with a girl Kiran and were supposed to get married. Ranjit had a lustful eye on Kiran and out of jealousy framed Chanrashekar in a false case and had him imprisoned for 5 years. After serving his term, he is told Ranjit had raped Kiran and she committed suicide out of shame. Chandrashekar decided to take his vengeance from Ranjit and kill him. He goes to visit Ranjit and Ranjit was sitting in his chair facing the opposite direction. As Chandrashekar approached him he saw to his surprise that Ranjit is now a disabled man. He changes his mind and decided Ranjit state of being is a worse punishment for him than his death. He spits on Ranjit's face and is about to leave. Ranjit wants to shoot Chandrashekar and in the brawl the gun is pointed at Ranjit and fires accidentally, killing Ranjit. Chandrashekar leaves the house and in his car on the way home realizes he had forgotten his wallet at Ranjit's house. He goes back to get it so the wallet doesn't tie him to the murder. He purposely causes his car to have an accident with a tree and fall into a trench. He approaches Ranjit's house under the pretenses that his car had an accident and he wants to use the phone but in the process really to recover his wallet. To his surprise, he finds Rani with the gun in her hand and ready to take the blame for the murder. It is later revealed she was willing to do this because she thought the man who she loved, Suresh had murdered Ranjit. He couldn't let an innocent take the blame. The court asks Chandrashekar what evidence he has. The nun stands up and it is revealed she is Kiran, the girl Chandrashekar loved. She states she had tried to commit suicide but God saved her, and thus she became a nun. The court decides it was self defense and frees Chandrashekar and Suresh. Rani and Suresh reunite and Kiran leaves as Chandrashekar stands watching.

== Cast ==
- Navin Nischol as Chandrashekhar/Prakash (based on Michael Starkwedder)
- Zeenat Aman as Rani Ranjit Singh (based on Laura Warwick)
- Sanjay Khan as Advocate Suresh Saxena
- Danny Denzongpa as Thakur Ranjit Singh (based on Richard Warwick)
- Madan Puri as Inspector Joshi
- Nana Palsikar as The Judge
- Deven Verma as Banke Lal
- Jagdish Raj as Inspector Bakshi
- Ashok Kumar as Public Prosecutor Mehta
- Urmila Bhatt as Mrs. Singh, Thakur Ranjit Singh's Stepmother

== Soundtrack ==
All songs were composed by Ravi and penned by Sahir Ludhianvi.

| # | Title | Singer(s) | Raga |
|---|---|---|---|
| 1 | "Jo Yahan Tha" | Asha Bhosle, Usha Mangeshkar | |
| 2 | "Jubna Se Chunariya Khisak Gai Re" | Manna Dey, Asha Bhosle | |
| 3 | "Uljhan Suljhe Na Rasta Sujhe Na" | Asha Bhosle | |
| 4 | "Sansar Ki Har Shae" | Mahendra Kapoor | Bhoopali |
