= Awam (film) =

1987 Indian Hindi film

- Poster
- Directed by: B. R. Chopra
- Produced by: B. R. Chopra
- Starring: Ashok Kumar; Rajesh Khanna; Raj Babbar; Smita Patil; Poonam Dhillon; Nana Patekar
- Music by: Ravi
- Release date: 11 September 1987
- Running time: 160 minutes
- Country: India
- Language: Hindi

Awam (transl. the Public) is a 1987 Indian Hindi-language action drama film directed and produced by B. R. Chopra. The film stars Ashok Kumar, Rajesh Khanna, Raj Babbar, Smita Patil, Poonam Dhillon, Nana Patekar, Shafi Inamdar in pivotal roles.

== Plot ==
Captain Amar Kumar of the Indian army lives with his father, Ram, and mother, Saraswati. Ram has been associated with top freedom fighters during India's struggle for independence from the British. Almost all of these freedom fighters had taken advantage of their involvement and have taken up important positions in India's administration, and these include Jagratan and Mohanlal, while others like Vehshat Ansari and Ram have chosen not to. Amar goes to Delhi and meets Mohanlal, who offers him the position of personal secretary with Jagratan. Then a chain of events leads to the death of Jagratan's pilot son, Surender, resulting in Jagratan threatening to expose the powers-that-be unless they come clean and admit their involvement. Then Jagratan is killed in a vehicle accident. Before dying, he asks Dr. Shabnam to hand over a key to Amar. Before Shabnam could do so, she is attacked by two unknown men, and wounded. Together with Amar and Rafiq Sayed Jaffrey, they locate the key - but do not know where to locate the lock. Then Shabnam is attacked again, but Amar rescues her. Amar's world is turned upside down when he is accused of treason, court-martialed, and dishonorably discharged from the army. Disillusioned by this, he decides to join the very forces that are involved in treason. And when he does he finds out that he is not amongst strangers at all.

== Cast ==
- Ashok Kumar as Vehshat Ansari
- Rajesh Khanna as Captain Amar Kumar
- Raj Babbar as Rafiq Jaffrey
- Smita Patil as Dr. Shabnam
- Poonam Dhillon as Sushma
- Nana Patekar as Colonel Mustafa Ali Zahidi
- Vijay Arora as Thakur Suryabhan Singh
- Shafi Inamdar as Mohanlal
- Iftekhar as Ram Kumar
- Ashalata Wabgaonkar as Saraswati
- Shreeram Lagoo as Minister / Lawyer
- Om Shivpuri as Jagratan
- Sushma Seth as Durga
- Deepak Parashar as Surendra
- Satish Shah as Triloki Prasad "T.P."
- Rajesh Puri as Taxi Driver Baldev Singh
- Saeed Jaffrey as Defence Lawyer Yashpal Nanda
- Dalip Tahil as Army Officer Shamsher Singh
- Dan Dhanoa as Dayal
- Puneet Issar as Paras, Dayal's Associate
- Arun Bakshi as Air Chief Marshall Vasudevan
- Gufi Paintal as Mr. Agarwal
- Huma Khan as Mrs. Suryabhan Singh
- Manisha Kohli as Princess Saloni

== Soundtrack ==
Song	Singer
"Raghupati Raghav Raja Ram, Patitpavan Seeta Ram"	Mahendra Kapoor
"Teri Aankhon Mein Dhundh Li Maine Pyar Ki Duniya"	Mahendra Kapoor
"Yeh Raat, Yeh Barsaat, Yeh Tanhaai Ka Aalam"	Mahendra Kapoor, Asha Bhosle
"Kaise Murli Bajaye Ghanshyam"	Asha Bhosle
"Mast Jawani Allah Hi Allah"	Asha Bhosle
