= B. R. Chopra =

Indian film director (1914–2008)

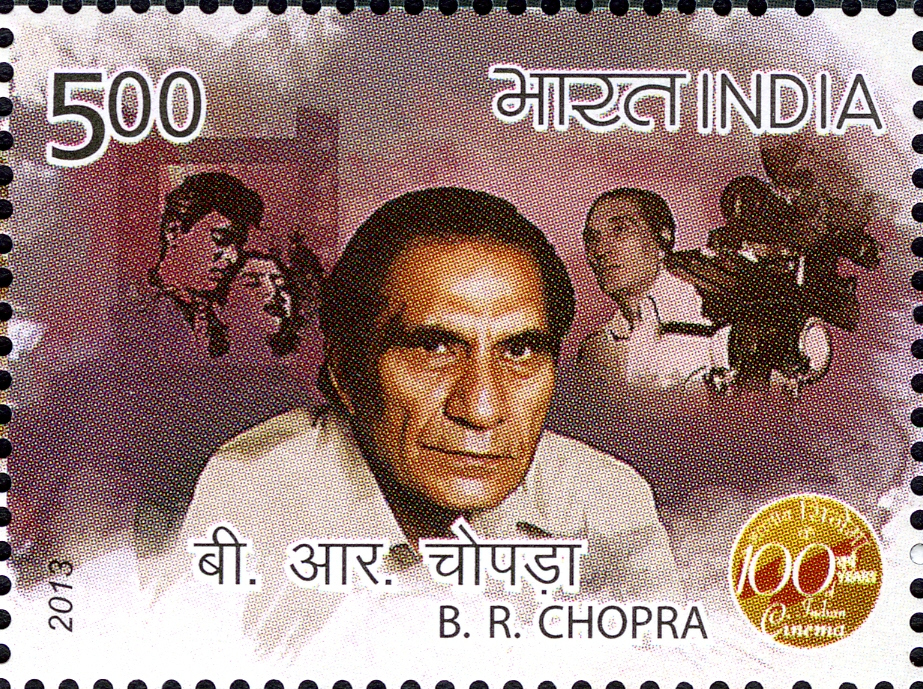
- Chopra on a 2013 stamp of India
- Born: Baldev Raj Chopra; 22 April 1914; Rahon, Punjab, British India (present-day Punjab, India)
- Died: 5 November 2008 (aged 94); Mumbai, Maharashtra, India
- Occupations: Film producer; director
- Years active: 1944–2006
- Spouse: Prakash Chopra
- Children: 3, including Ravi Chopra
- Relatives: See Chopra-Johar family
- Honours: Dadasaheb Phalke Award (1998); Padma Bhushan (2001)

Baldev Raj Chopra (22 April 1914 – 5 November 2008) was a prolific Indian director and producer noted for pioneering the Hindi film industry and television series. He's known for directing notable films, such as Afsana, Ek Hi Raasta, Naya Daur, Sadhna, Kanoon, Gumrah, Hamraaz, Dhund, Pati Patni Aur Woh, Insaf Ka Tarazu and Nikaah. He also produced hit films, including Dhool Ka Phool, Waqt, Ittefaq, Aadmi Aur Insaan, Chhoti Si Baat, The Burning Train, Aaj Ki Awaaz, Baghban and the TV series, Mahabharat. He was awarded Dadasaheb Phalke Award, India's highest award in cinema, for the year 1998, and Padma Bhushan, India's third highest civilian award, in 2001.

His younger brother Yash Chopra, son Ravi Chopra and nephew Aditya Chopra are also directors in the Bollywood industry. His nephew Uday Chopra is an actor and producer.

== Biography ==
Chopra was born on 22 April 1914 in Rahon, Shaheed Bhagat Singh Nagar district (formerly Nawanshahr district) to Vilayati Raj Chopra, an employee of the PWD. He later shifted to Lahore. He was the second of several siblings; his youngest brother was filmmaker Yash Chopra.

Chopra received an M.A. in English literature from University of the Punjab in Lahore. He started his career in 1944 as a film journalist with Cine Herald, a film-monthly published in Lahore, he later took over the magazine and ran it until 1947. In the same year, he launched a film with a story by I. S. Johar, Chandni Chowk. Naeem Hashmi was hero of this movie and Erika Rukhshi was the heroine. Just as the production of film was to start, riots broke out in Lahore and he and his family had to flee from the city. After the partition of India into India and Pakistan in 1947, he moved to Delhi. He later moved to Mumbai, where his first production, Karwat, began in 1948, though it turned out to be a flop. His first film as a director, Afsana, was released in 1951 and featured Ashok Kumar in a double role – the film was a hit and established his name in Bollywood. Chopra made Chandni Chowk, with Meena Kumari as a lead, in 1954. In 1955, Chopra formed his own production house, B.R Films. His first movie for this production house was Ek Hi Raasta (1956) which was highly successful.

During 1956–57, Chopra became involved in a legal battle with Madhubala and her father, Ataullah Khan, regarding the production of Naya Daur. When Khan refused to allow Madhubala to attend an outdoor shoot in Bhopal citing safety concerns, Chopra sued them for breach of contract. The case gained significant public attention when lead actor Dilip Kumar testified in favour of Chopra, leading to Madhubala's eventual exit from the film and her replacement by actress Vyjayanthimala. The dispute was historically noted for contributing to the high-profile breakup of Madhubala and Dilip Kumar; Chopra ultimately withdrew the case after the film's release in 1957. Naya Daur explored the conflict between tradition and modernization in post-independence India; it was a major critical and commercial success, with a critic for Amrita Bazar Patrika praising Chopra for "deliver[ing] a commendable film" that "combines ... purposeful and [picturesque] theme[s]".

Chopra's subsequent releases like Kanoon with Rajendra Kumar, Gumrah and Hamraaz with Sunil Dutt were major hits in the sixties. In 1963, he was a member of the jury at the 13th Berlin International Film Festival. His second film with actor Dilip Kumar was Dastaan which became a flop in 1972.

He directed successful film across genres after 1972, with films like suspense thriller Dhund (1973), drama Karm (1977), comedy film Pati Patni Aur Woh (1978), crime film in Insaf Ka Tarazu (1980), Muslim social in Nikaah (1982) and the political thriller Awam (1987).

He was the producer for the films Dhool Ka Phool (1959), Waqt (1965), Aadmi Aur Insaan (1969) and Ittefaq (1969) directed by his younger brother Yash Chopra, and he also produced The Burning Train (1980), Mazdoor (1983), Aaj Ki Awaaz (1984), Baghbhan (2003), Baabul (2006), Bhoothnath (2008) which were directed by Ravi Chopra.

Chopra forayed into television with Mahabharat, which become the most successful TV serial with a 92% viewer record in Indian television history, where Nitish Bharadwaj played the role of Krishna and Mukesh khanna portrayed the role of Bhishma. This was co-directed by him with his son. He also produced TV Series on Bahadur Shah Zafar, Kanoon, Vishnu Puran, Aap Beeti and Maa Shakti.

He died in Mumbai at the age of 94 on 5 November 2008, survived by his son, Ravi Chopra, and two daughters Shashi and Bina.

== Awards ==
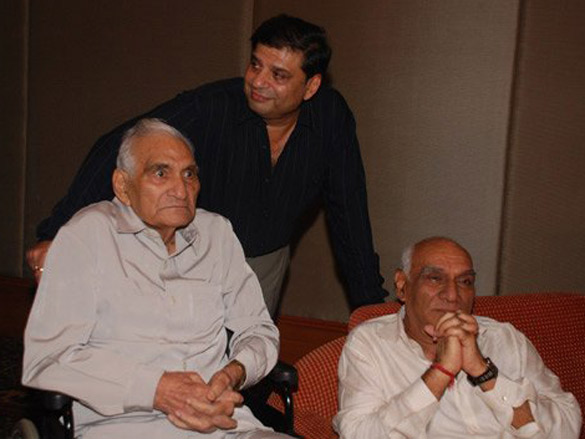
B. R. Chopra (sitting left) and Yash Chopra attending audio release of Naya Daur

Civilian awards

- Padma Bhushan (2001)

National Film Awards

- 1960: Third Best Feature Film in Hindi – Kanoon
- 1961: Best Feature Film in Hindi – Dharmputra (Producer)
- 1963: Third Best Feature Film in Hindi – Gumrah
- 1967: Best Feature Film in Hindi – Hamraaz
- 1998: Dadasaheb Phalke Award

Filmfare Awards

- 1962: Filmfare Award for Best Director: Kanoon
- 2004: Filmfare Lifetime Achievement Award

== Filmography ==
Year	Title	Director	Producer	Notes
1949	Karwat	No	Yes	
1951	Afsana	Yes	Yes	
1953	Shole : A Tale of Burning Tears	Yes	No	
1954	Chandni Chowk	Yes	No	
1956	Ek Hi Rasta	Yes	Yes	
1957	Naya Daur	Yes	Yes	
1958	Sadhna	Yes	Yes	
1959	Dhool Ka Phool	No	Yes	
1960	Kanoon	Yes	Yes	
1961	Dharmputra	No	Yes	
1963	Gumrah	Yes	Yes	
1965	Waqt	No	Yes	
1967	Hamraaz	Yes	Yes	
1969	Aadmi Aur Insaan	No	Yes	
1969	Ittefaq	No	Yes	
1972	Dastaan	Yes	Yes	
1973	Dhund	Yes	Yes	
1975	Zameer	No	Yes	
1976	Chhoti Si Baat	No	Yes	
1977	Karm	Yes	Yes	
1978	Pati Patni Aur Woh	Yes	Yes	
1980	The Burning Train	No	Yes	
1980	Insaf Ka Tarazu	Yes	Yes	
1981	Agni Pareeksha	No	Yes	
1982	Beta	No	Yes	
1982	Nikaah	Yes	Yes	
1982	Teri Meri Kahani	No	Yes	TV Film
1983	Mazdoor	No	Yes	
1983	Dharti Aakash	No	Yes	TV Film
1984	Aaj Ki Awaaz	No	Yes	
1985	Ghazal	No	Yes	
1985	Tawaif	Yes	No	
1986	Kirayadar	No	Yes	
1986	Dahleez	No	Yes	
1986	Bahadur Shah Zafar	Yes	Yes	TV Series
1987	Awam	Yes	Yes	
1988	Mahabharat	No	Yes	TV Series
1991	Mahabharat Katha	Yes	Yes	TV Series
1991	Pratigyabadh	No	Yes	
1992	Kal Ki Awaz	No	Yes	
1992	Sauda	Yes	Yes	TV Series
1993	Kanoon	Yes	No	TV Series
2000	Vishnu Puran	No	Yes	TV Series
2002–2004	Ramayan	Yes	Yes	TV Series
2001–2004	Aap Beeti	No	Yes	TV Series
2002–2003	Ma Shakti	Yes	Yes	TV Series
2003	Baghban	No	Yes	
2004	Kamini Damini	No	Yes	TV Series
2006–2007	Viraasat	No	Yes	TV Series
2006	Baabul	No	Yes	
