= Assembly House =

Georgian Grade I listed building in Norwich, England

Coordinates: 52.6268°N 1.2907°E

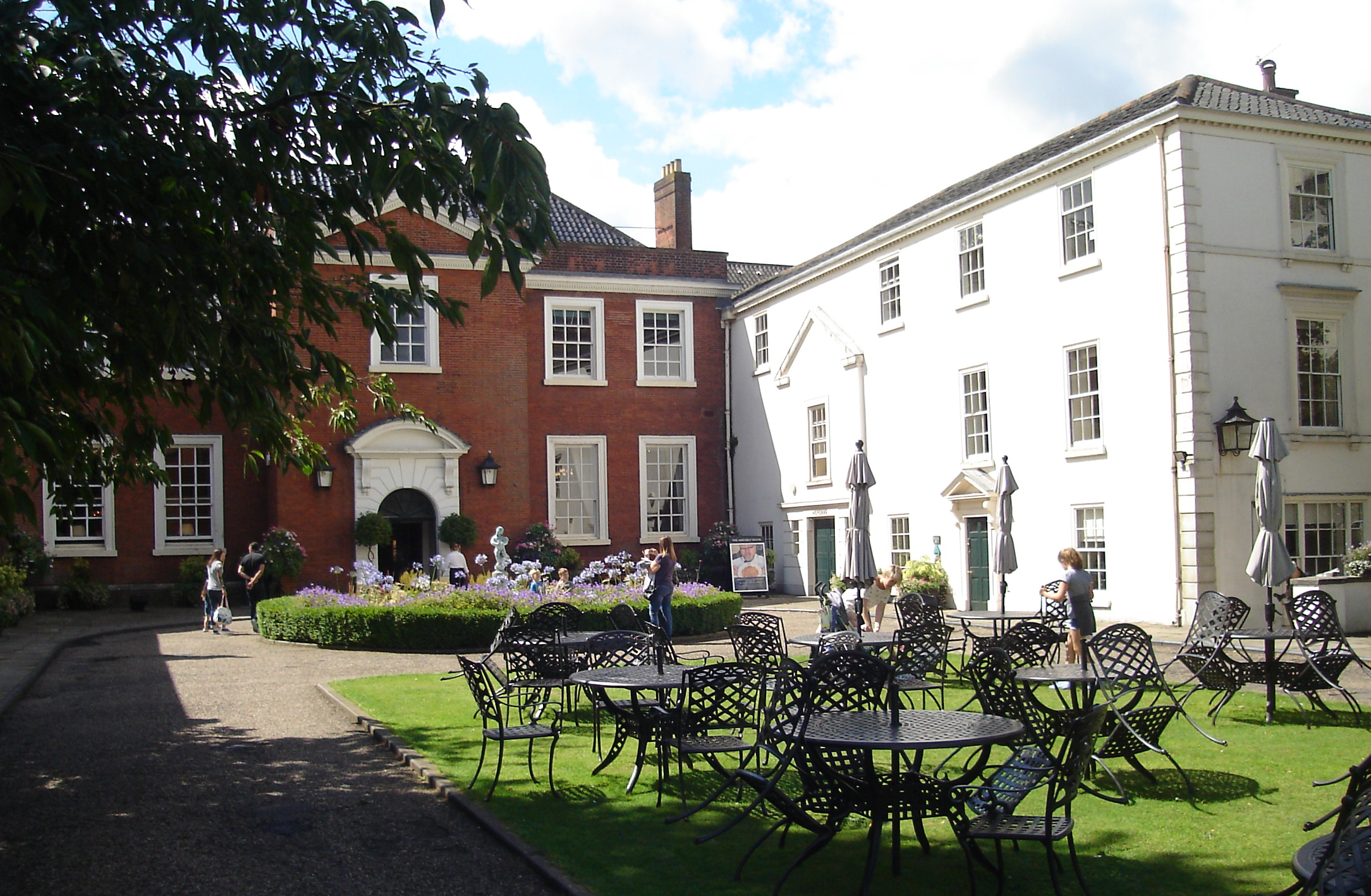
The Assembly House, August 2017

The Assembly House is a Georgian Grade I listed building located in Norwich, United Kingdom.

Today, the Assembly House is used for conferences, exhibitions, visual and performing arts activities, and weddings, and is owned by a registered arts charity. In 2025, the venue hosted a concert as part of the touring Kala Festival, featuring artists including Pandit Debasis Chakroborty (Indian Slide Guitar), Ustad Akram Khan (Tabla), and Raga Pianist Deepak Shah. It is one of the twelve historic Norwich buildings in the Norwich 12 initiative, a project to develop an integrated group of heritage attractions in the city.

== History ==
The origins of the Assembly House date back to 1248 when John Le Brun founded The Chapel and Hospice of St Mary's in the Field, a hospital dedicated to the Blessed Virgin Mary, on the site. In 1278 the hospital became a college for secular priests, The College of St Mary in the Fields. From 1404, when Norwich was granted the right to govern itself in the form of a corporation, assemblies were held at the college in which citizens chose bailiffs (the officials who were to govern the city for the following year). The college was also the base for the Feast of Corpus Christi, an important annual festival in which the trade guilds marched in procession.

In 1544 the college was closed as a result of Henry VIII's Dissolution of the Monasteries and in 1548 the buildings were surrendered to the crown. The chapel, cloisters and choir were all demolished and the remainder of the building was sold to the Dean to serve as a private house. In 1569 the site came into the hands of the Cornwallis family when it was acquired by Sir Thomas Cornwallis as a townhouse. In 1609 the site was acquired by Sir Henry Hobart, and became known as "Chapel of the Field House". In 1753, John Hobart, 1st Earl of Buckinghamshire, granted a 500-year lease of Chapel Field House estate (as it was then known) to a number of aldermen of the city for the sum of £1,800 plus an annual rent of £5. The aldermen subsequently unveiled plans for its conversion into "public places of entertainment for the county and the city", appointing architect Thomas Ivory, who also built the Octagon Chapel in the city, to oversee the works, assisted by Sir James Burrough. Ivory decided to demolish the central section of the building and designed a new house for the site, which became a 'House of Assemblies' where events were held for the gentry of Norwich.

From 1876 to 1939 the building was used by the Girls Public Day School (now the Norwich High School for Girls). During the Second World War the building was converted for use as a camouflage school. In 1950 the building underwent a major restoration at a cost of £70,000 and re-opened in May 1950 as a centre for entertainment and the Arts called "The Assembly House". The restoration had been encouraged by Oliver Messel and funded by the Norwich-based shoe manufacturer H. J. Sexton.

In 1995 the roof and the ceilings of the entrance hall, restaurant and Music Room were destroyed in a major fire, although much of the wooden panelling and Georgian plasterwork remained intact and many of the paintings and pieces of furniture were saved. The Assembly House was restored with the support of local businesses and re-opened in February 1997.

== See also ==
- The Forum, Norwich
