= Dartington Hall =

Historic house and country estate in Devon, England

Coordinates: 50.4518°N 3.6938°W

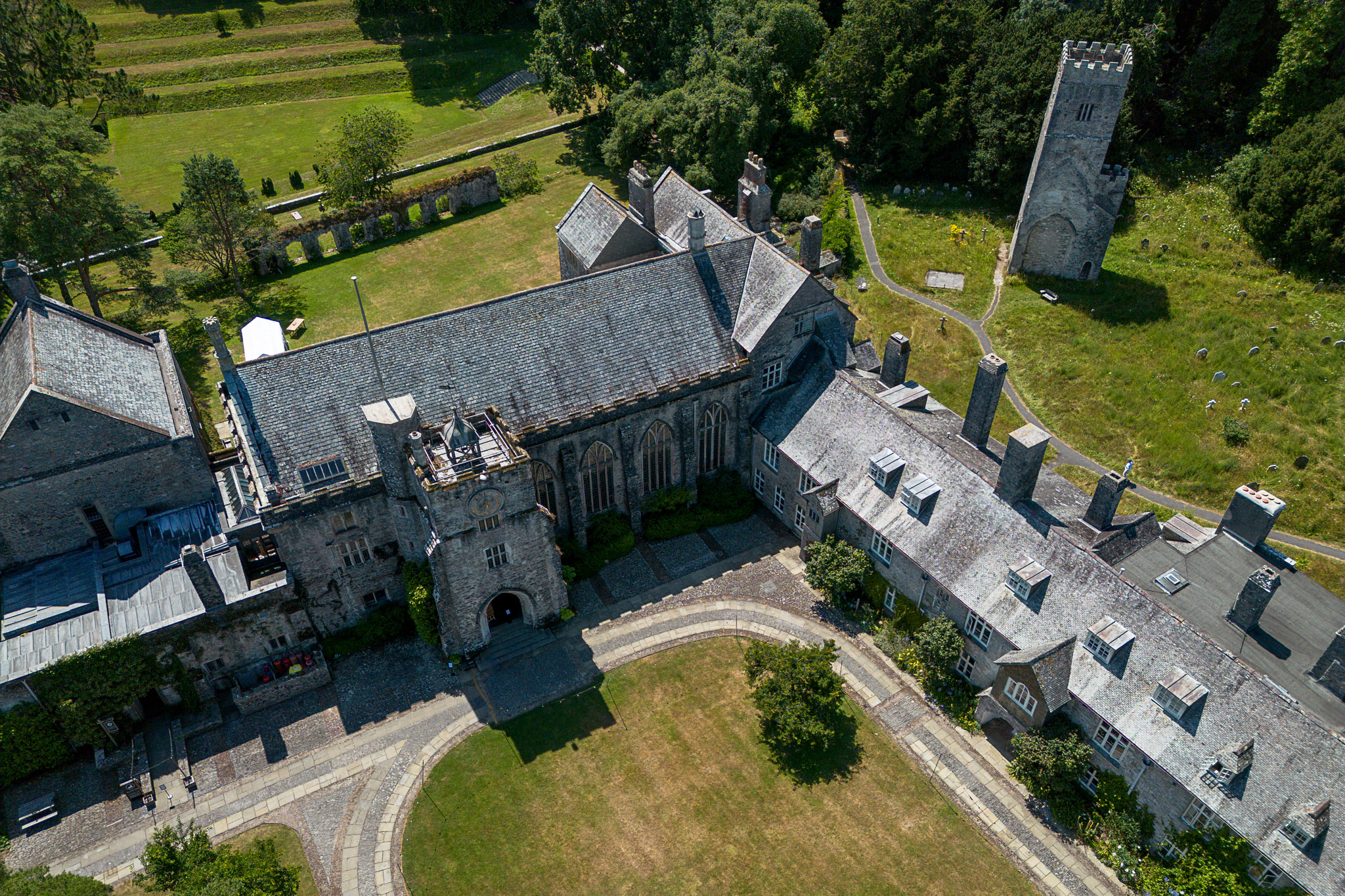
Dartington Hall courtyard. The Great Hall and entrance in the center top, and the medieval lodgings on the right.

Dartington Hall in Dartington, near Totnes, Devon, England, is an historic house and country estate of around 800 acres (320 hectares) dating from medieval times. The group of late 14th century buildings are Grade I listed; described in Pevsner's Buildings of England as "one of the most spectacular surviving domestic buildings of late Medieval England", along with Haddon Hall and Wingfield Manor. The medieval buildings are grouped around a huge courtyard; the largest built for a private residence before the 16th Century, and the Great Hall itself is the finest of its date in England. The west range of the courtyard is regarded nationally as one of the most notable examples of a range of medieval lodgings. The medieval buildings were restored from 1926 to 1938.

The site is now the home of the Dartington Trust, which in the past has run a number of charitable educational programmes, including Schumacher College, Dartington Arts School, Research in Practice and the Dartington Music Summer School & Festival. In addition to its own live arts and events, the Trust uses the Great Hall and the estate to support businesses' and is available to hire as a venue for events and weddings, along with conserving the Grade II Listed Gardens.

== Dartington Hall estate ==
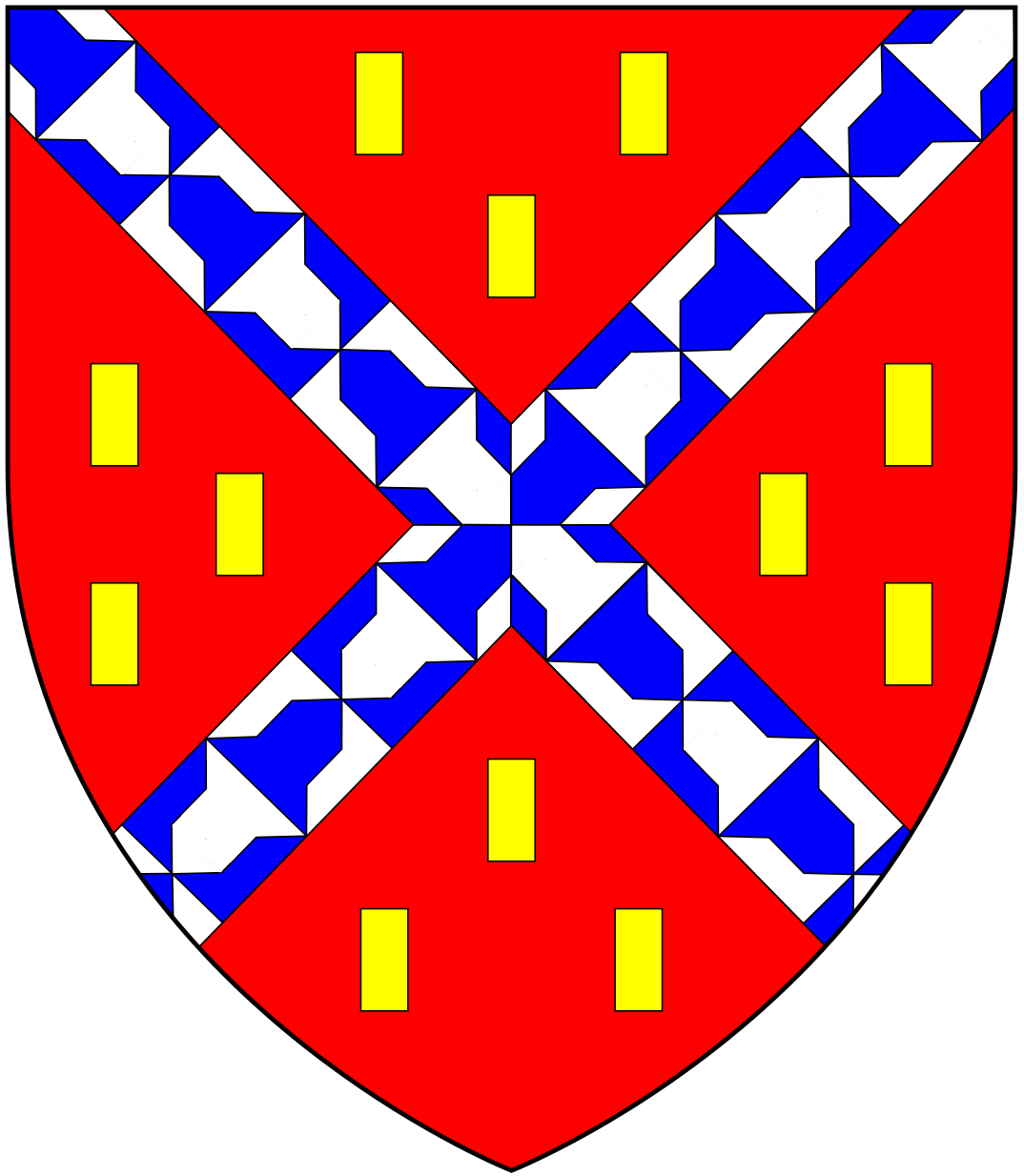
Arms of Champernowne: Gules, a saltire vair between twelve billets or

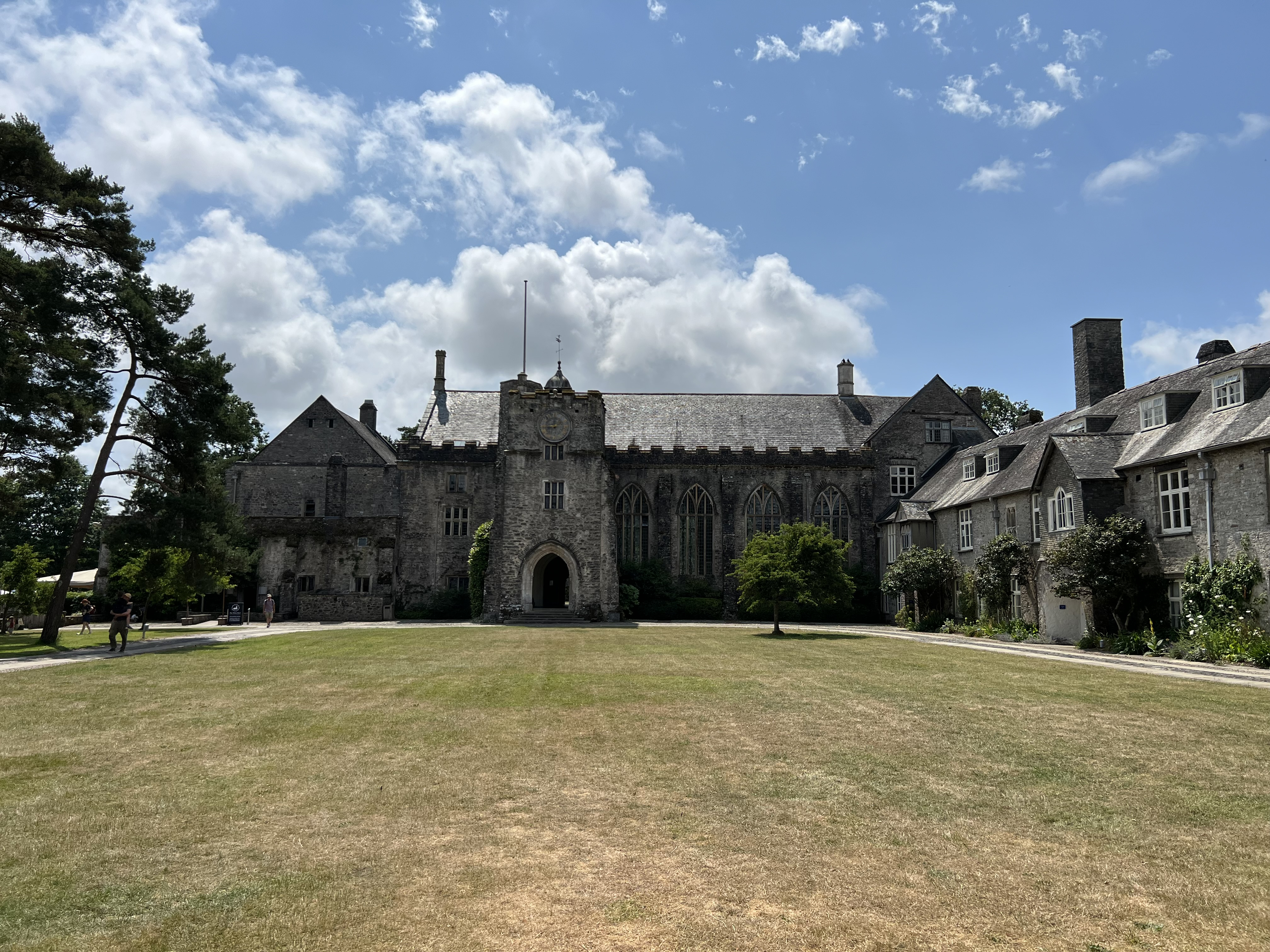
Entrance to the Great Hall

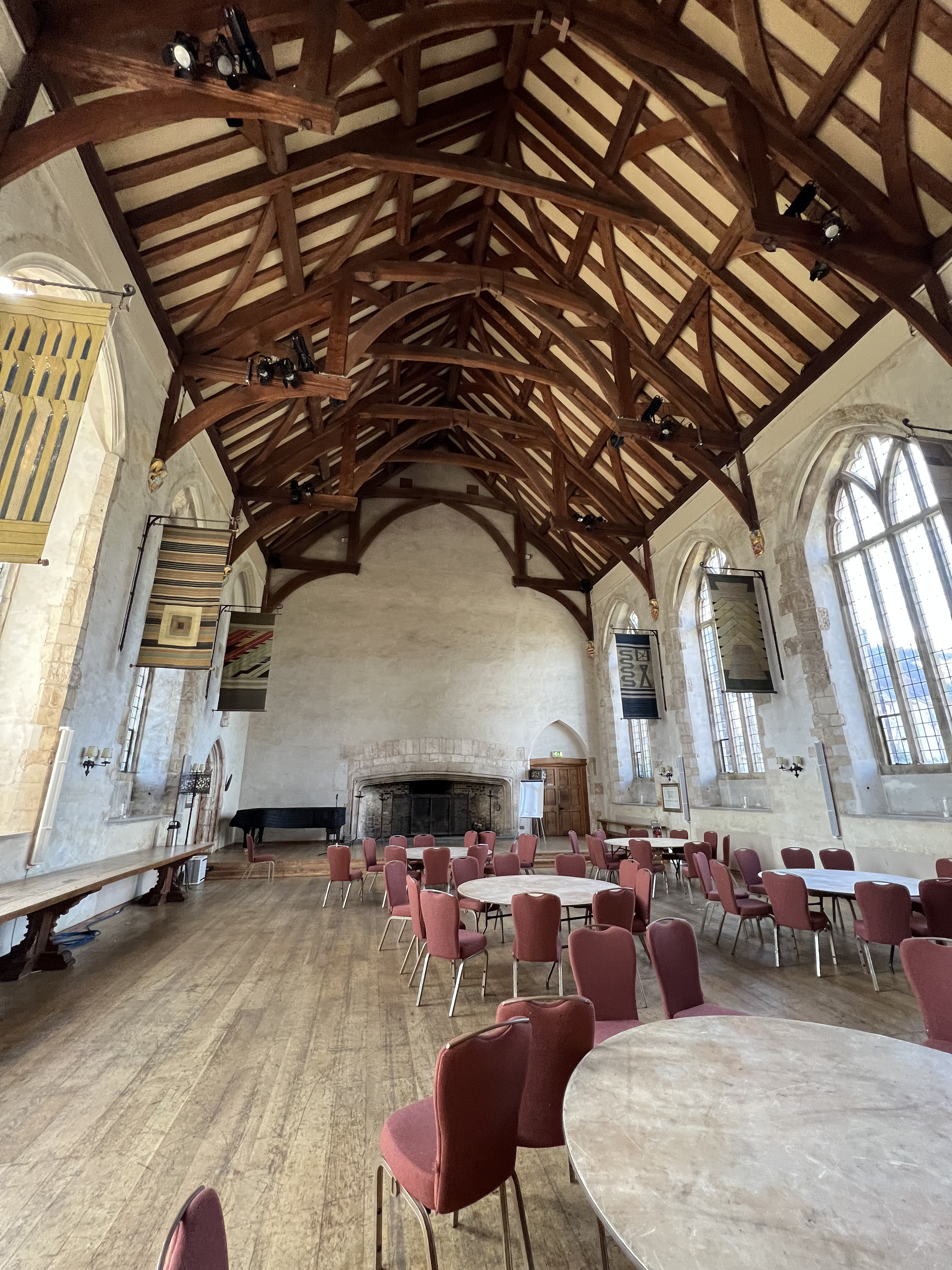
Dartington Hall, inside Great Hall, showing hammerbeam roof

The estate was held by the Martin family between the early 12th and mid-14th centuries, but on the death of William Martin in 1326, the feudal barony of Dartington escheated to the crown and in 1384 was granted by King Richard II to his half brother John Holland, 1st Duke of Exeter (c.1352–1400), created in 1388 Earl of Huntingdon and in 1397 Duke of Exeter.

=== Historic buildings ===
The 1st Duke built the mediaeval hall between 1388 and his death in 1400 and the sculpted arms of Richard II survive on ribbed vault of the Porch. The 1st Duke was beheaded by King Henry IV who had deposed Richard II, however Dartington continued as the seat of his son John Holland, 2nd Duke of Exeter (1395–1447) and grandson Henry Holland, 3rd Duke of Exeter (1430–1475) successively. On the death of the 3rd Duke in 1475 without issue, supposedly drowned at sea on the orders of King Edward IV, Dartington again escheated to the crown. In 1559 it was acquired by Sir Arthur Champernowne, Vice-Admiral of the West under Elizabeth I, whose descendants in a direct male line lived in the Hall for 366 years until 1925.

The hall was mostly derelict by the time it was bought in 1925 by the British-American millionaire couple Leonard Elmhirst (orig. from Yorkshire) and his wife Dorothy (née Whitney) from New York. They commissioned architect William Weir to renovate the medieval buildings and notably restore the Great Hall's hammerbeam roof.

=== 20th century and the Dartington experiment ===
The influence of Rabindranath Tagore on Leonard Elmhirst, and the interests and money of his wife Dorothy, led them to undertake an experiment in rural reconstruction at Dartington Hall. It is said that Tagore had become familiar with Dartington during his travels in England and influenced Elmhirst in his selection of the estate for purchase.

The energy and investments of the Elmhirsts and a number of significant innovations in rural regeneration became organised departments working on the estate. The innovations included "the social and spiritual "questing" that underwrote support for peace movements, Eastern mysticism and ultimately social science; the progressive educational values that led to the founding of Dartington School; the artistic commitments that made the place an innovator in pottery and textiles and – by 1938 – a refuge for sixty or so avant-garde Continental dancers, sculptors and playwrights; and the agricultural ventures which, if never profitable, became a seedbed for research."

In 1928, Leonard Elmhirst began collaborating with Alice Blinn, who worked for Delineator Home Institute to create a home economics training centre and modernise domestic activities of the village. Blinn recommended initiatives including education, apprenticeship programmes, a laboratory, a modern kitchen, cafeteria, laundry, and lavatories, based on what was available in a modern American home. Unable to persuade Blinn to move to England, Elmhirst abandoned the plan. Blinn's recommended kitchen equipment was installed but arranged in a typical English fashion because the headmaster's wife did not like the design.

In 1935, the Dartington Hall Trust, a registered charity, was set up in order to run the estate.

High Cross House was built in 1932 as a home for the headmaster of Dartington Hall school. It was designed by Swiss-American architect William Lescaze and is now regarded as an important modernist building. It is Grade II* listed.

Aller Park, the original Dartington Hall School, was built 1929–31 and designed by Ides Van Der Gracht of the New York firm of Delano and Aldrish. Intended as a junior school, it was built in a lavish Americanised Tudor style. Soon afterwards came Foxhole, the senior school built 1931–32, and boarding houses Blacklers (1933), Chimmels (1934) and Orchards (1935) in a straightforward modern idiom. A modern extension was added to Orchards, and a drama hall built nearby – both of 1964. East of the medieval Hall an arts centre and dance school with a large hall was built 1930–32, with several additions in 1938 and 1966. To the North of the Hall, Higher Close Students Centre was built in 1963 adjacent to the present main car park. Huxhams Cross and Broom Park were built 1932 as estate workers houses. At Shinners Bridge is the central Office of the estate (1935) and the Sawmill (1931–32). The Cider Press Centre was built 1976 for the growing tourist trade.

=== The estate today ===
In addition to historic buildings the estate has a number of legacy 20th century buildings from the Elmhirsts' social enterprises, including the defunct Dartington Hall School, which closed in 1987, and High Cross House which is now a base for Busby & Fox. Other buildings are being used by various businesses and departments at the Trust. The Old Postern is now home to an independent School. The Cider Press Centre, a shopping centre at Shinners Bridge, is also run by the Trust and home to other independent businesses.

The Hall and medieval courtyard functions in part as a conference centre and wedding venue and provides bed and breakfast accommodation for people attending events and for casual visitors. The Barn Cinema and the White Hart Bar and Restaurant are used by estate dwellers, residents from the surrounding countryside, and visitors alike.

In 2023 and 2025, the Great Hall hosted the Kala Festival, a touring South Asian classical music series featuring leading artists such as Pandit Debasis Chakroborty (Indian Slide Guitar), Raga Pianist Deepak Shah, Lovely Sharma (Sitar), and Durjay Bhaumik (Tabla) in 2023; and Pandit Sanju Sahai (Tabla), Ustad Akram Khan (Tabla), Pandit Debasis Chakroborty (Indian Slide Guitar), Tommy Khosla (Sitar), and Jonathan Mayer (Sitar) in 2025.

In North Devon, the Beaford Centre was set up as an arts centre by the Dartington Trust in the 1960s to bring employment and culture to a rurally depressed area. With similar social objectives, the Trust established the Dartington Crystal factory at Great Torrington in June 1967 under the name of Dartington Glass.

== Dartington Music Summer School & Festival ==
Dartington Music Summer School & Festival was a department of the Dartington Trust until 2023 which is now reformed into ChoralFest. It was both a festival and a music school which ran for over 70 years with an "ethos of bringing together top-quality performers and composers to work with students and amateur musicians in concerts and classes in a relaxed, informal atmosphere." Participants, both amateur musicians and advanced students, spend the daytime studying a variety of different musical courses, and the evenings attending (or performing in) concerts. In addition to instrumental and vocal masterclasses, there are courses at various levels on subjects such as composition, opera, chamber music, conducting and improvisation. Courses include choirs, orchestras, individual masterclasses, and non classical music such as Jazz, Salsa and Gamelan. Composition teachers have included Luciano Berio, Luigi Nono, Bruno Maderna, Harrison Birtwistle, Peter Maxwell Davies, Brian Ferneyhough, Witold Lutosławski and Elliott Carter.

== Dartington Gardens ==
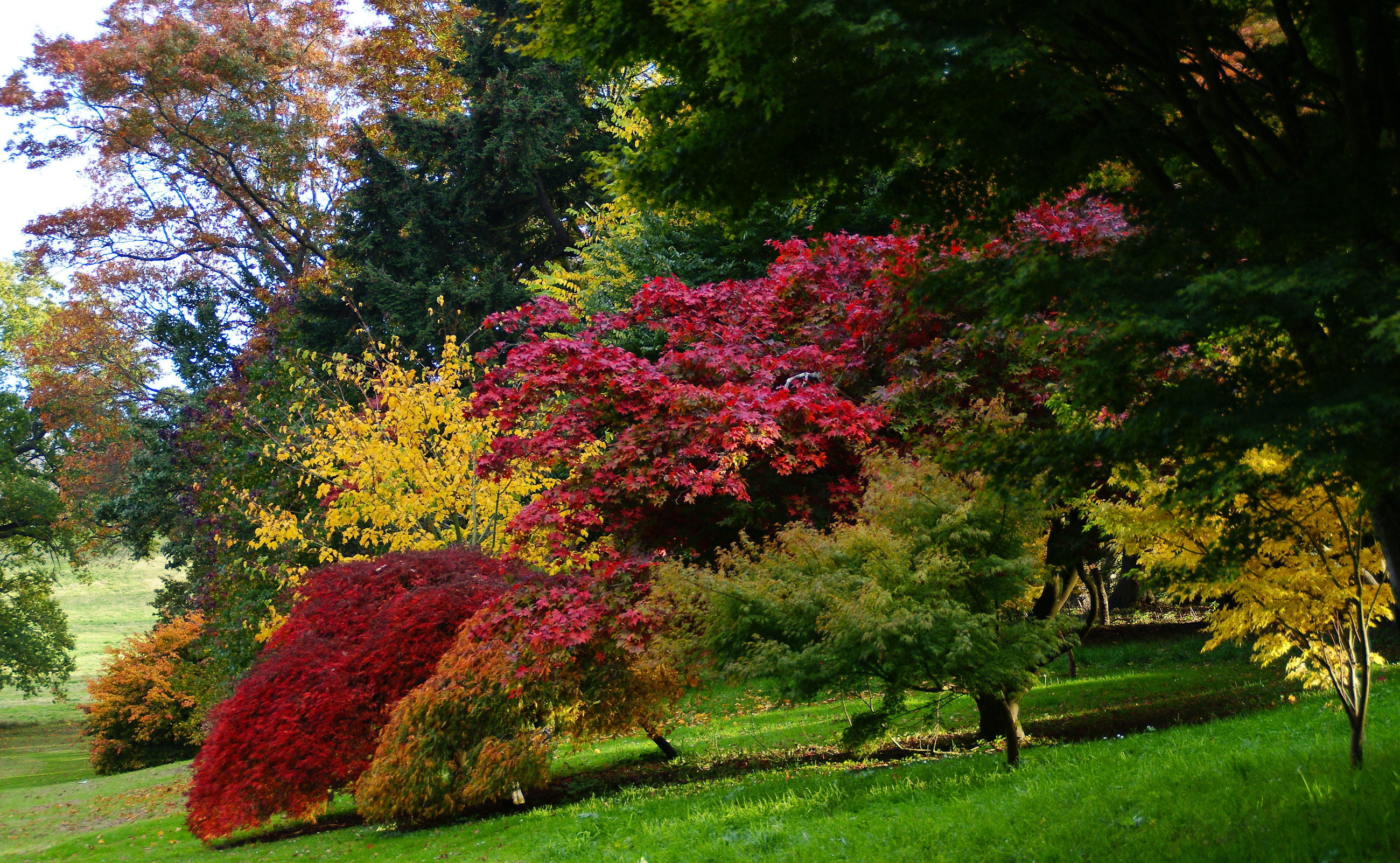
Autumn in the gardens

The gardens were created by Dorothy Elmhirst with the involvement of major landscape designers Beatrix Farrand and Percy Cane and feature a tiltyard (thought actually to be the remains of an Elizabethan water garden) and major sculptures, including examples by Henry Moore, Willi Soukop and Peter Randall-Page. There is an ancient yew tree (Taxus baccata) reputed to be nearly 2000 years old and legend has it that Knights Templar are buried in the graveyard there, although there is no evidence to substantiate this.

== Former activities ==
=== Dartington Hall School ===
Dartington Hall School, founded in 1926, offered a progressive coeducational boarding life. When it started there was a minimum of formal classroom activity and the children learned by involvement in estate activities. It was to have "no corporal punishment, indeed no punishment at all; no prefects; no uniforms; no Officers' Training Corps; no segregation of the sexes; no compulsory games, compulsory religion or compulsory anything else, no more Latin, no more Greek; no competition; no jingoism."

With time more academic rigour was imposed, but it remained progressive and had mixed success educating the children, sometimes the more wayward ones, of the fee-paying parents. A noted alumnus was Lord Young, a founder of Which? and the Open University. Lucian Freud attended the school for two years and his brother Clement Freud was also a pupil there. Other noted alumni include Eva Ibbotson, songwriter Kit Hain, Ivan Moffat, Jasper Fforde, Sheila Ernst, Lionel Grigson, Miriam Gross, Martin Bernal, Matthew Huxley, Max Fordham, Oliver Postgate, Richard Leacock, Jasia Reichardt, Nicolas Rea, Claire Tomalin and the sculptor Sokari Douglas Camp.

Son of the founders, Michael Straight, also attended the school. Straight later attended Cambridge and became a speechwriter to Franklin D Roosevelt, and after the war, publisher of the New Republic, a magazine which the Whitney family owned. In his memoir After Long Silence, Straight stated he had been recruited as a Communist agent by Cambridge spy Anthony Blunt, but had become disillusioned with the Party after the war.

W. B. Curry was headmaster of the school from 1931 to 1957, and wrote two books about it, The School, published by The Bodley Head in 1934, and Education for Sanity, published by Heinemann in 1947.

The author Dennis Wheatley novelised the activities of some people based at the school in his 1947 book The Haunting of Toby Jugg. This was a supernatural thriller which sensationalised some real-life events before the war, setting them at a fictional school called "Weylands". Years later, it was revealed that these events had attracted the attention of MI5 in a declassified report called "The Case Against Dartington Hall".

At its peak, the school had some 300 pupils. However, with the advent of state-based progressive education, the death of its founders, and the appointment of a new headmaster in whose time the school attracted considerable negative publicity – not least owing to his calling the police to the school to combat alcohol and drug abuse taking place, the death by drowning of a student, and his wife's modelling for pornographic photographs – the school suffered a dramatic drop in recruitment. The school was forced to close in 1987. After the school's closure, a number of staff and students set up Sands School which still carries some of the principles that Dartington once had.

It has been suggested that the school 'Knotshead' in the novel A Private Place by Amanda Craig was based upon Dartington Hall school, as the events in the book are similar to those that occurred within the final years of Dartington Hall.

Literary editor Miriam Gross wrote an account of her time at the school in her memoir, and also published in the May 2011 edition of Standpoint magazine.

=== Tagore ===
Inspired by a long association with Rabindranath Tagore's Shantiniketan, where Tagore was trying to introduce progressive education and rural reconstruction into a tribal community, the Elmhirsts set out in the 1920s on a similar goal for the depressed agricultural economy in rural England.

In May 2010, Sotheby's sold a group of 12 paintings by Rabindranath Tagore, which had been given by Tagore to Leonard Elmhirst. In Autumn 2011, The Trust proposed the sale of additional artworks by Ben Nicholson, Christopher Wood, Alfred Wallis and others, again at Sotheby's. The sale generated some criticism from local people, who voiced concerns about deaccessioning of the Trust's art assets. The Trust argued that the founders went to considerable lengths to make clear that art works and other assets could and should be used and sold at the discretion of the Trustees to support the activities of the Trust.

=== Dartington College of Arts ===
Dartington College of Arts was a specialist arts institution based at the hall from 1961 to 2010, focusing mainly on the performance arts. In 2008, it became part of University College Falmouth and subsequently relocated to Falmouth, Cornwall. In 2021, the Trust re-opened the Dartington Arts School with five new Masters programmes, including Arts and Place, Arts and Ecology and Poetics of Imagination.

== Gallery ==
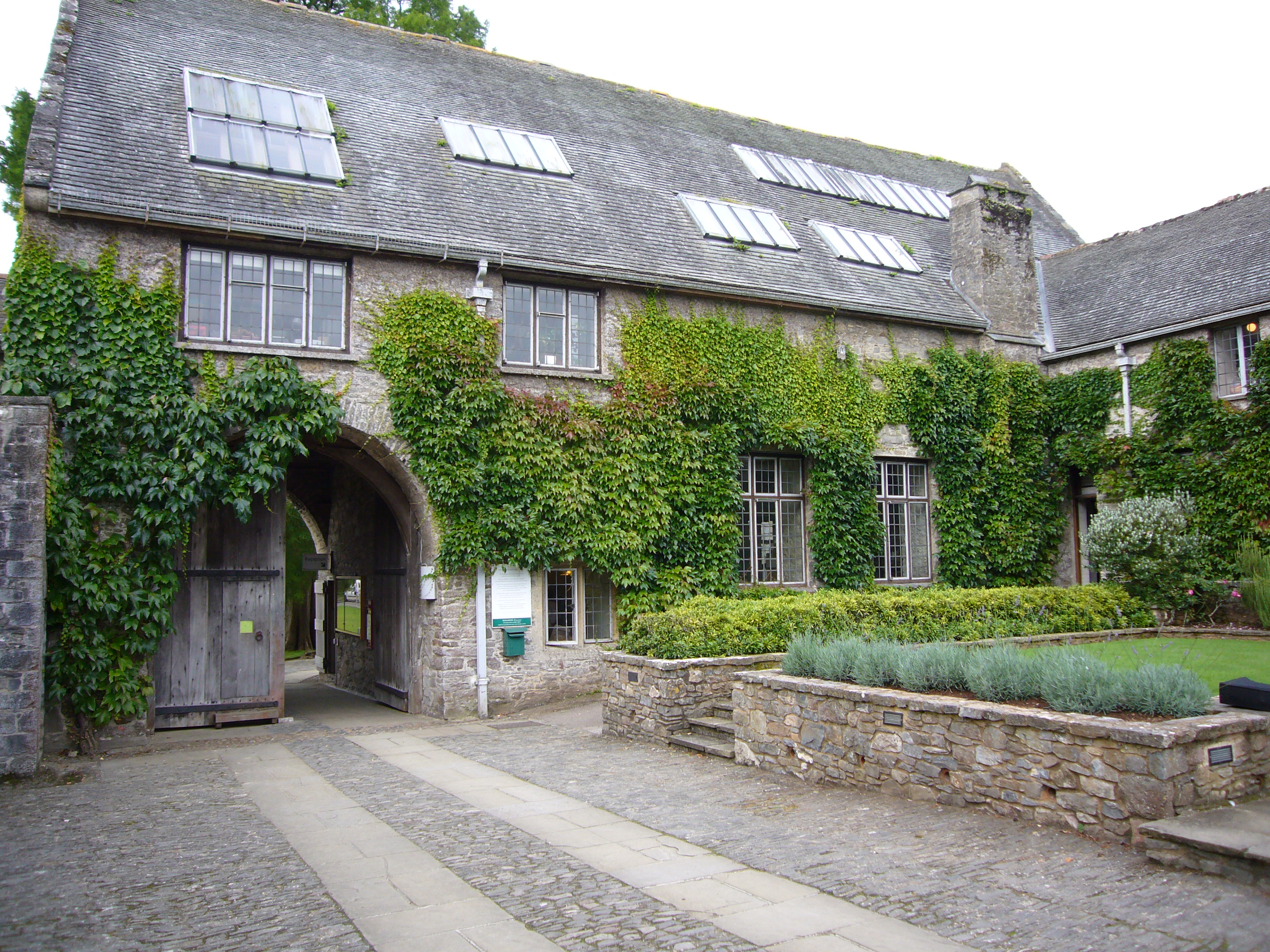
Courtyard north entrance

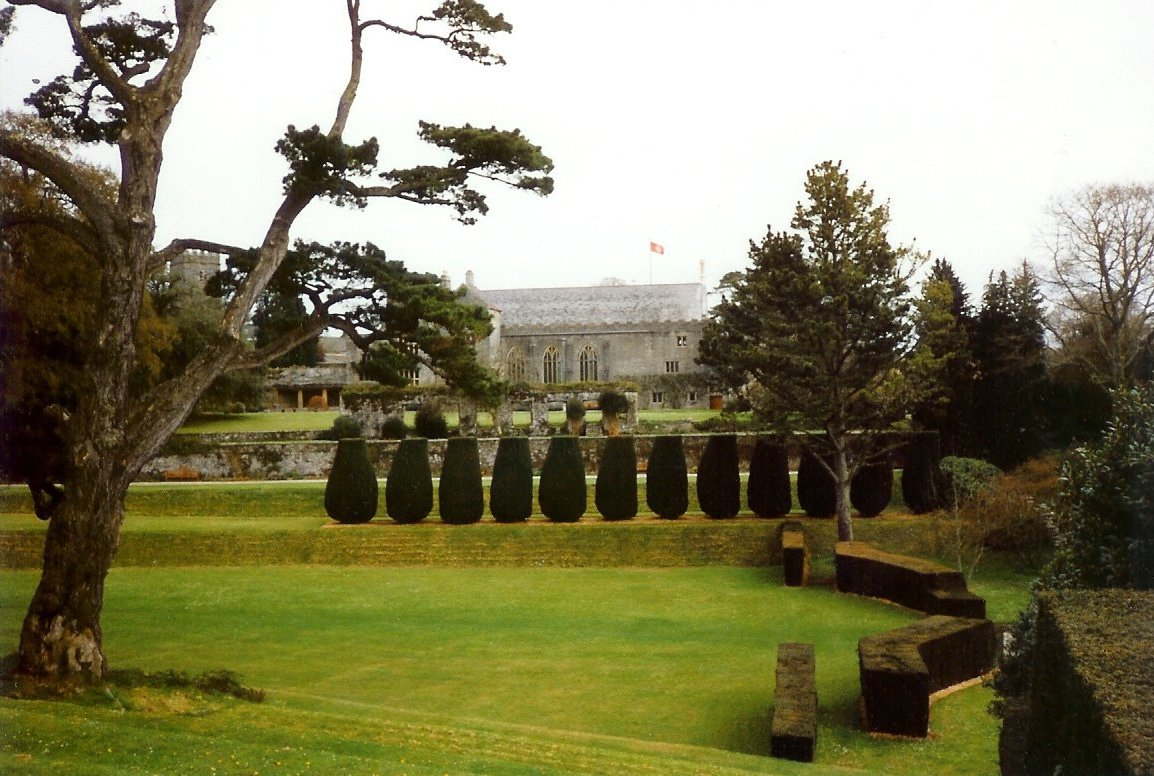
View of gardens and Hall

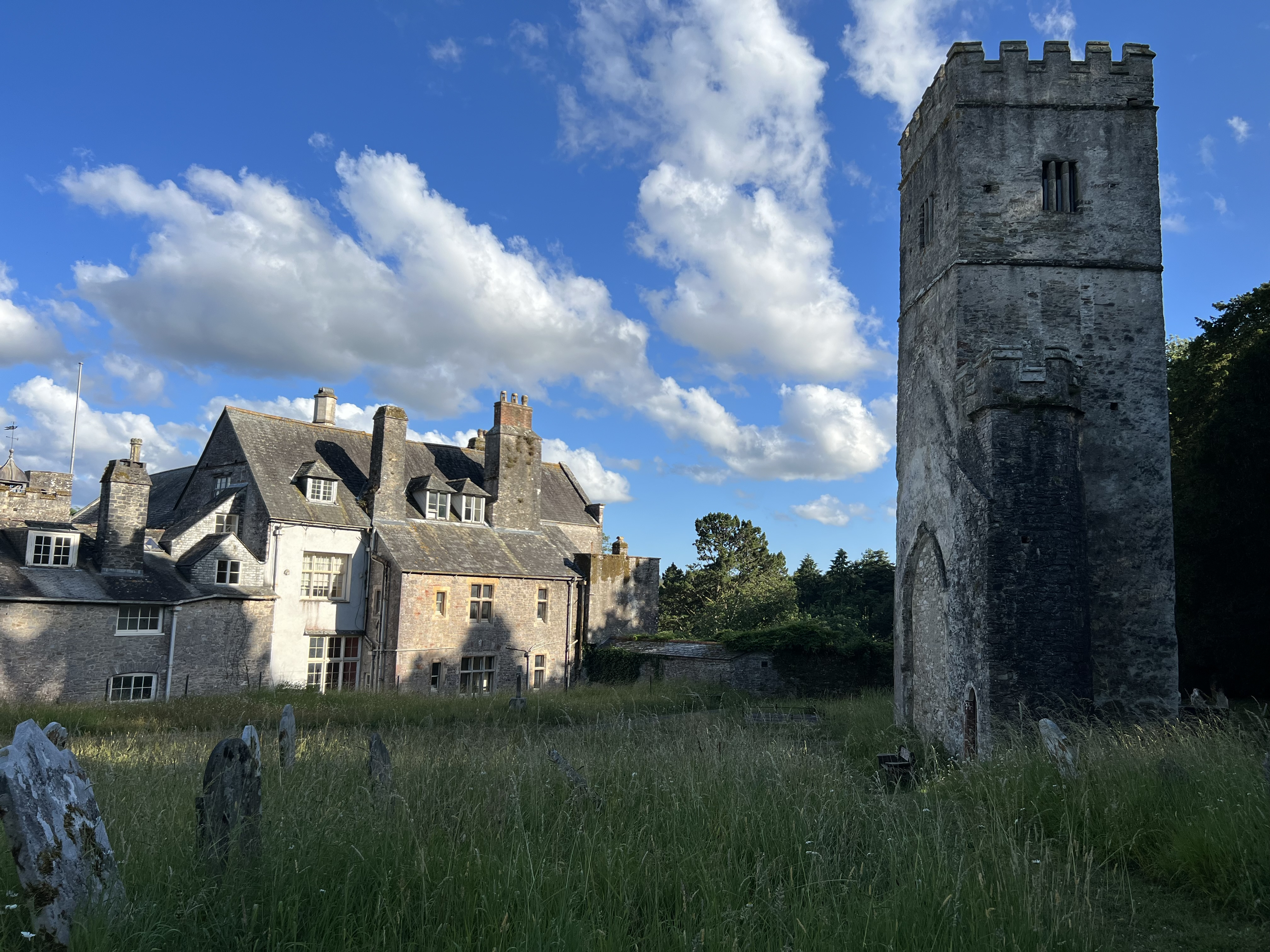
Tower from St. Mary's church behind Dartington Hall

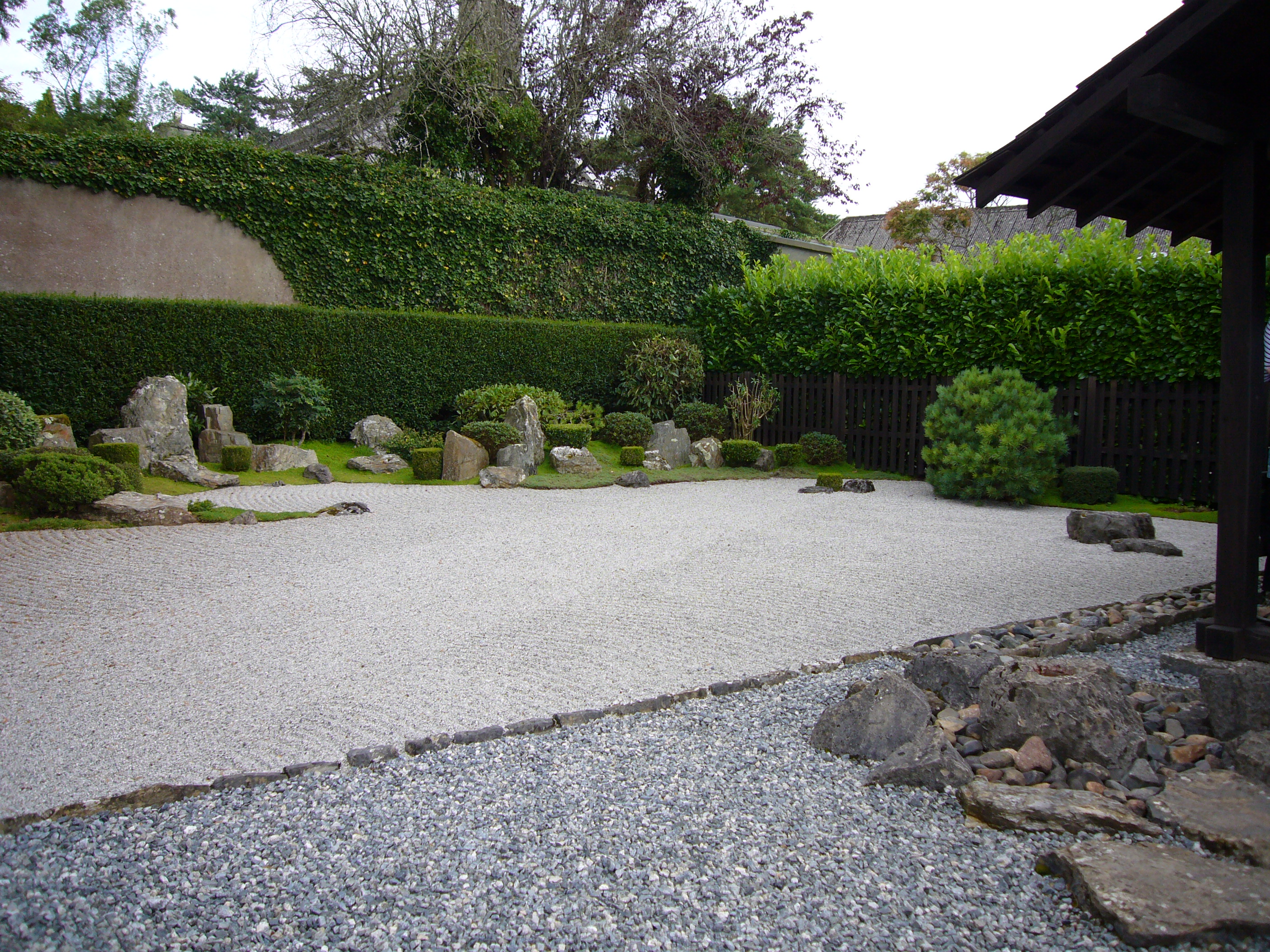
Zen garden

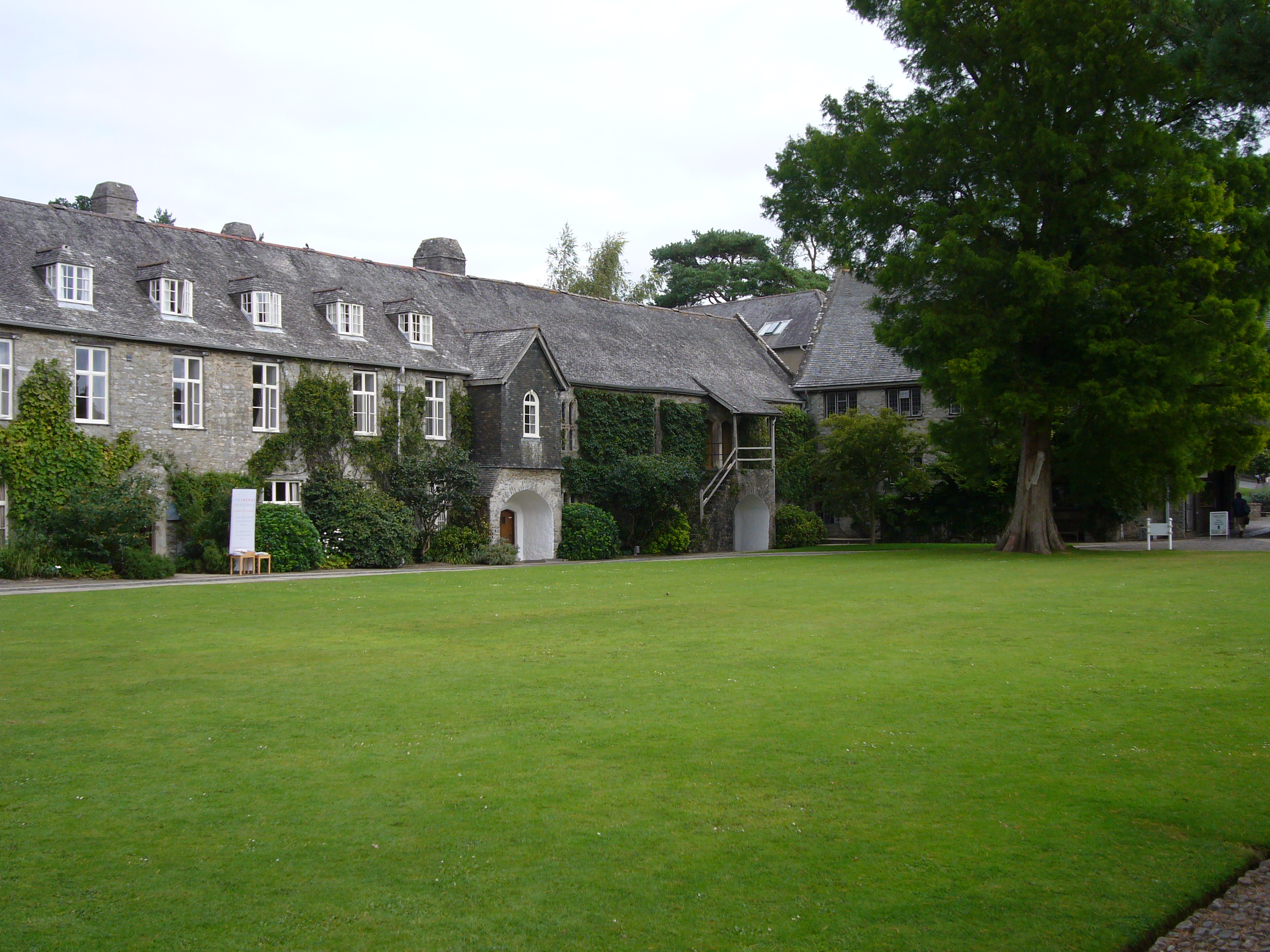
North corner of Courtyard

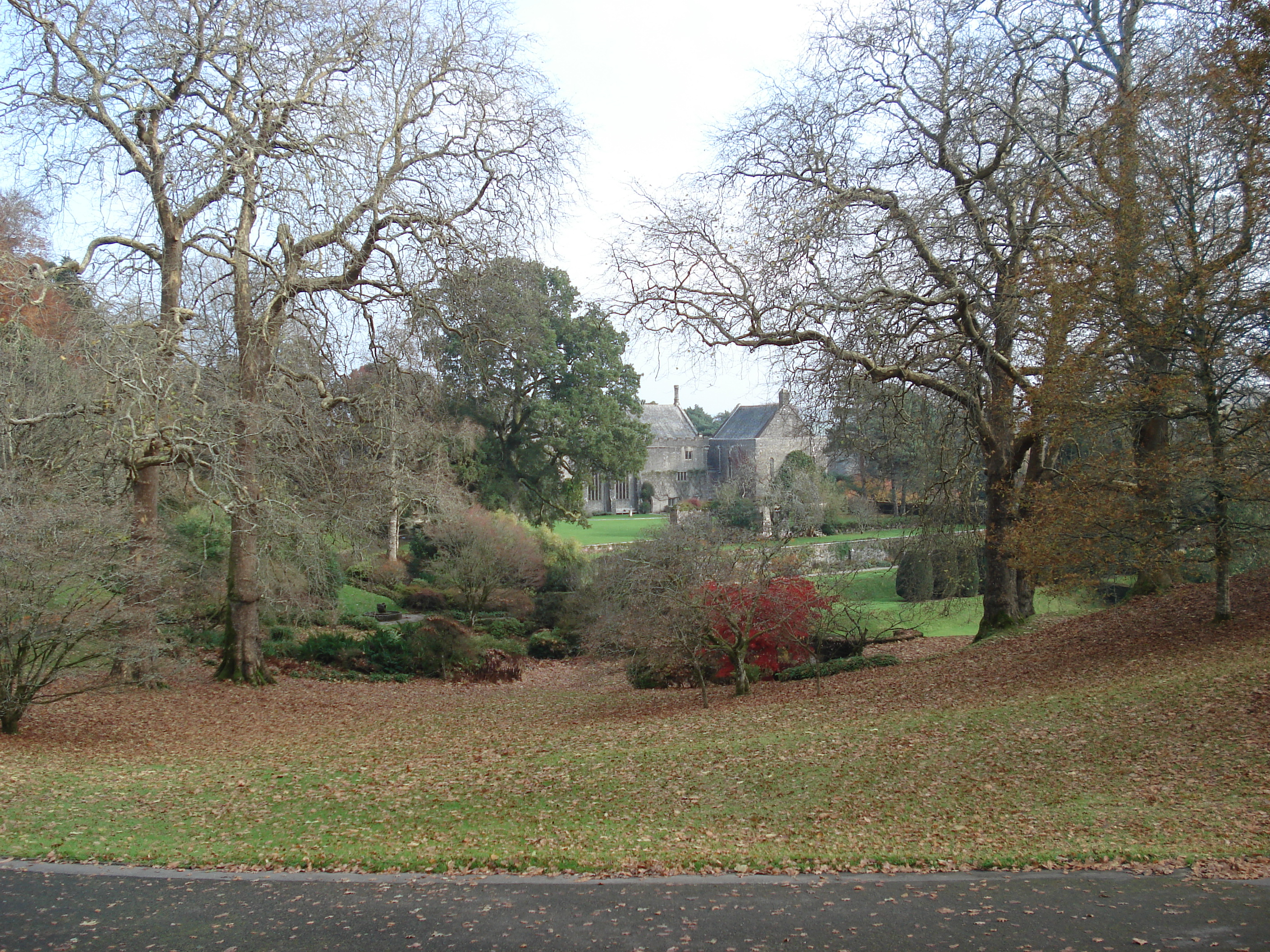
Gardens in winter

== See also ==
- D. G. Champernowne, mathematician and economist, buried in the church yard
- Dart, a poem by Alice Oswald (Dartington Hall's gardener)
- Schumacher College, a department of the Trust based primarily at the Old Postern on the Dartington estate.
