= Chhachhrauli Assembly constituency =

Constituency of the Haryana legislative assembly in India

Coordinates: 30.25°N 77.37°E

- Former constituency for the Haryana Legislative Assembly

Constituency details
- Country: India
- Region: North India
- State: Haryana
- Established: 1967
- Abolished: 2008
- Total electors: 1,22,763

Chhachhrauli Assembly constituency was an assembly constituency in the India state of Haryana.

== Members of the Legislative Assembly ==
Election	Member	Party
1967	R. Parkash	Indian National Congress
1968	Parbhu Ram	Indian National Congress
1972	Parbhu Ram	Indian National Congress
1977	Kanhaiyalal	Indian National Congress
1982	Roshan Lal	Lokdal
1987	Mohamad Aslam Khan	Indian National Congress
1991	Mohamad Aslam Khan	Indian National Congress
1996	Akram Khan	Independent politician
2000	Kanwar Pal Gujjar	Bharatiya Janata Party
2005	Chaudhary Arjun Singh	Bahujan Samaj Party

== Election results ==
=== Assembly Election 2005 ===
2005 Haryana Legislative Assembly election: Chhachhrauli
Party	Candidate	Votes	%	±%
BSP	Chaudhary Arjun Singh	35,853	33.86%	▲12.11
INLD	Akram Khan	31,625	29.87%	New
INC	Amir Hassan	23,841	22.52%	▲16.02
BJP	Kanwar Pal Gujjar	11,459	10.82%	▼24.07
NCP	Mahant Hukam Chand	1,460	1.38%	New
Independent	Vivek Zutshi	870	0.82%	New
BRP	Sunita Kashyap	739	0.70%	New
Margin of victory		4,228	3.99%	▲0.26
Turnout		1,05,872	86.24%	▼0.05
Registered electors		1,22,763		▲15.70
BSP gain from BJP		Swing	▼1.03	

=== Assembly Election 2000 ===
2000 Haryana Legislative Assembly election: Chhachhrauli
Party	Candidate	Votes	%	±%
BJP	Kanwar Pal Gujjar	31,948	34.89%	▲10.32
Independent	Akram Khan	28,527	31.16%	New
BSP	Amir Hassan	19,923	21.76%	▼2.97
INC	Naresh Kumar	5,951	6.50%	▼0.72
HVP	Arjun Singh	4,934	5.39%	New
Margin of victory		3,421	3.74%	▲3.31
Turnout		91,562	87.02%	▲3.94
Registered electors		1,06,107		▼1.45
BJP gain from Independent		Swing	▲9.74	

=== Assembly Election 1996 ===
1996 Haryana Legislative Assembly election: Chhachhrauli
Party	Candidate	Votes	%	±%
Independent	Akram Khan	22,302	25.15%	New
BSP	Aman Kumar	21,925	24.73%	▲1.44
BJP	Kanwar Pal Gujjar	21,782	24.57%	▲7.45
SAP	Mahipal Singh	12,839	14.48%	New
INC	Vrish Bhan	6,401	7.22%	▼16.48
AIIC(T)	Ramesh Chand	1,148	1.29%	New
Margin of victory		377	0.43%	▲0.01
Turnout		88,661	86.52%	▲6.70
Registered electors		1,07,664		▲14.14
Independent gain from INC		Swing	▲1.45	

=== Assembly Election 1991 ===
1991 Haryana Legislative Assembly election: Chhachhrauli
Party	Candidate	Votes	%	±%
INC	Mohamad Aslam Khan	16,916	23.70%	▼10.76
BSP	Aman Kumar	16,623	23.29%	New
JP	Mahipal Singh	13,390	18.76%	New
BJP	Kanwar Pal Gujjar	12,214	17.12%	New
JD	Sunil Kumar	8,556	11.99%	New
Independent	Braj Pal	930	1.30%	New
Doordarshi Party	Tirath Ram	385	0.54%	New
Margin of victory		293	0.41%	▼10.09
Turnout		71,363	78.65%	▼2.79
Registered electors		94,330		▲12.18
INC hold		Swing	▼10.76	

=== Assembly Election 1987 ===
1987 Haryana Legislative Assembly election: Chhachhrauli
Party	Candidate	Votes	%	±%
INC	Mohamad Aslam Khan	22,732	34.46%	▲2.93
Independent	Ram Rattan Singh	15,809	23.97%	New
Independent	Surjit Singh	12,529	18.99%	New
LKD	Begraj Singh	11,148	16.90%	▼16.17
VHP	Nirbhay Singh	1,110	1.68%	New
Independent	Jaswan Singh	1,103	1.67%	New
Independent	Rameshwar Dass	687	1.04%	New
Independent	Sat Pal	386	0.59%	New
Margin of victory		6,923	10.50%	▲8.95
Turnout		65,961	80.02%	▲4.06
Registered electors		84,087		▲18.26
INC gain from LKD		Swing	▲1.39	

=== Assembly Election 1982 ===
1982 Haryana Legislative Assembly election: Chhachhrauli
Party	Candidate	Votes	%	±%
LKD	Roshan Lal	17,493	33.07%	New
INC	Abdul Rashid	16,676	31.53%	▼6.10
Independent	Arjan Lal	8,264	15.63%	New
Independent	Naresh Kumar	3,861	7.30%	New
Independent	Rattan Amol Singh	2,578	4.87%	New
Independent	Sadhu Ram	905	1.71%	New
Independent	Krishan Dev	847	1.60%	New
Independent	Samer Chand	566	1.07%	New
Independent	Dharam Singh	509	0.96%	New
Independent	Babu Ram	279	0.53%	New
Margin of victory		817	1.54%	▼8.05
Turnout		52,889	75.97%	▲0.07
Registered electors		71,102		▲19.75
LKD gain from INC		Swing	▼4.55	

=== Assembly Election 1977 ===
1977 Haryana Legislative Assembly election: Chhachhrauli
Party	Candidate	Votes	%	±%
INC	Kanhaiyalal	16,603	37.63%	▼12.82
Independent	Ram Rattan Singh	12,371	28.04%	New
JP	Dharam Singh	11,811	26.77%	New
Independent	Rattan Amol Singh	2,191	4.97%	New
RPI(K)	Sumer Chand	1,150	2.61%	New
Margin of victory		4,232	9.59%	▲0.72
Turnout		44,126	75.70%	▲15.45
Registered electors		59,374		▼10.91
INC hold		Swing	▼12.82	

=== Assembly Election 1972 ===
1972 Haryana Legislative Assembly election: Chhachhrauli
Party	Candidate	Votes	%	±%
INC	Parbhu Ram	19,793	50.45%	▼9.00
CPI	Des Raj	16,313	41.58%	New
Independent	Telu	1,436	3.66%	New
Independent	Itavari Lal	938	2.39%	New
Independent	Rattna	752	1.92%	New
Margin of victory		3,480	8.87%	▼10.04
Turnout		39,232	61.11%	▲19.08
Registered electors		66,648		▲15.11
INC hold		Swing	▼9.00	

=== Assembly Election 1968 ===
1968 Haryana Legislative Assembly election: Chhachhrauli
Party	Candidate	Votes	%	±%
INC	Parbhu Ram	13,696	59.45%	▲16.97
VHP	Phool Chand	9,340	40.55%	New
Margin of victory		4,356	18.91%	▲16.39
Margin of victory		4,356	18.91%	▲16.39
Turnout		23,036	41.63%	▼23.92
Registered electors		57,897		▲0.93
INC hold		Swing		

=== Assembly Election 1967 ===
1967 Haryana Legislative Assembly election: Chhachhrauli
Party	Candidate	Votes	%	±%
INC	R. Parkash	15,525	42.48%	New
Independent	P. Chand	14,605	39.97%	New
CPI	S. Ram	3,312	9.06%	New
ABJS	Kishore	3,101	8.49%	New
Margin of victory		920	2.52%	
Turnout		36,543	68.98%	
Registered electors		57,364		
INC win (new seat)				
