= Manal Al Dowayan =

Saudi Arabian contemporary artist

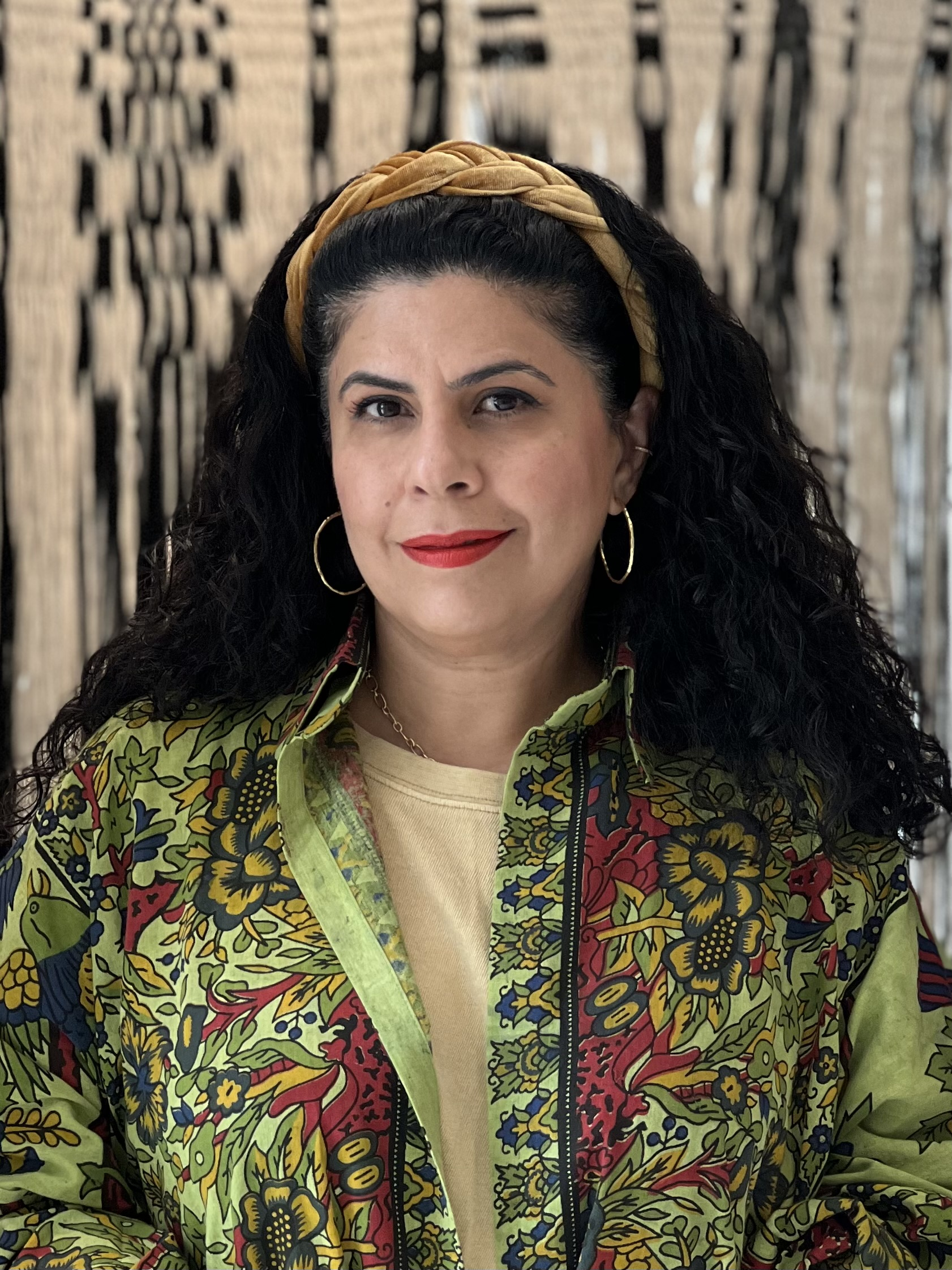
Al Dowayan in 2023

Manal Al Dowayan (Arabic: منال الضويان Manāl aḍ-Ḍawayān; born 1973) is a Saudi Arabian contemporary artist. She works in photography, sculpture, sound, neon and participatory installation, and much of her work examines the roles and visibility of women in Saudi society.

She represented Saudi Arabia at the 60th Venice Biennale in 2024 with Shifting Sands: A Battle Song, a participatory multimedia installation that drew on workshops with about 1,000 Saudi women. Her other works include Now You See Me, Now You Don't (2020), an installation of trampolines set into the desert near AlUla that remains on permanent display, and Suspended Together (2011). She was the visual director of Thikra: Night of Remembering (2025), a dance production with the choreographer Akram Khan.

== Early life ==
Al Dowayan was born in 1973 in Dhahran in Saudi Arabia's Eastern Province. She graduated with a master's degree in systems analysis and design. She began her career working for an oil company before moving to a full-time artistic practice. Her practice examines personal and political questions about women's rights in Saudi Arabia, including restrictions on women's travel and driving that were in force when much of her work was made. In 2018, she completed a master's degree in Contemporary Art Practice in the Public Sphere at the Royal College of Art in London.

== Photography ==
Al Dowayan's early work primarily used black and white photography, including images from her I Am collection, Drive-By Shootings, and Nostalgia Carries Us. The I Am collection from 2005 was inspired by a speech given by King Abdullah Al Saud when he took the Saudi throne in 2005, in which he emphasized the importance of women's participation in building and enriching Saudi society. The statement was interpreted in many ways by critics both for and against women's rights. Inspired by the statement, Al Dowayan photographed the women she believed the king was referring to, from engineers to mothers to scientists, and her series promoted the visibility and importance of Saudi Arabian women. Photographs from the Drive-By Shootings collection (2011) show the difficulty female artists in Saudi Arabia faced when their public movements were heavily restricted. At the time, women in Saudi Arabia could not legally drive, so a male driver took her around while she photographed from the passenger seat of the moving vehicle. The resulting blurred images emphasize that she could not simply step out of the car to make her art, and had to maintain gender-appropriate behavior as part of her creative process.

== Installation art ==
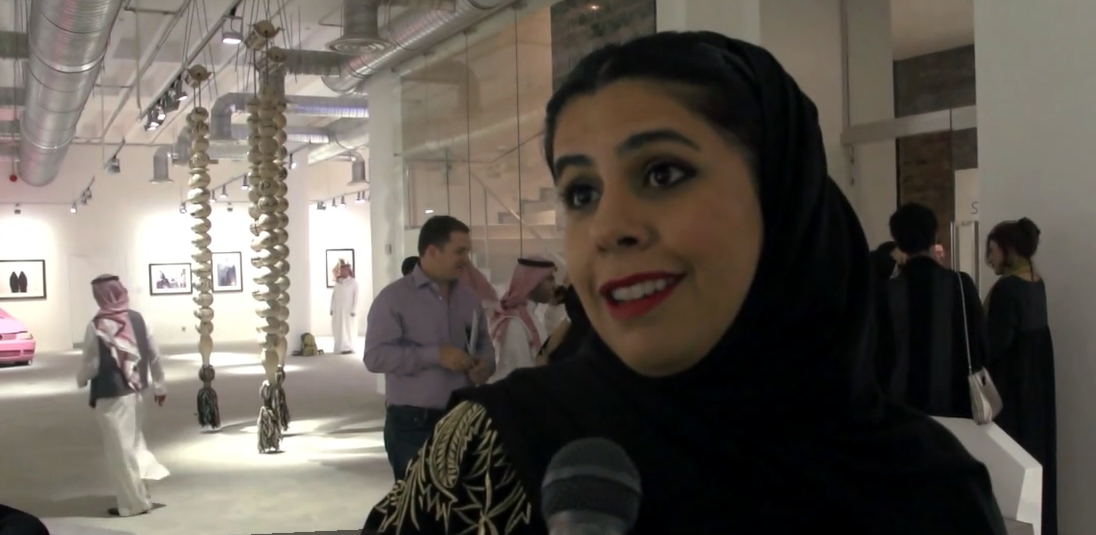
Manal Al Dowayan with the Soft Power show behind

In 2012, Al Dowayan's installation work was featured in the Edge of Arabia show We Need to Talk in Jeddah, Saudi Arabia. The show highlighted the need for progressive reform in Saudi Arabia as perceived by the artists. Al Dowayan's work Esmi My Name featured larger-than-life wooden worry beads with the names of women painted on them, hung from wool rope woven by Bedouin women. In parts of Saudi society, saying a woman's name in public has been considered taboo, which Al Dowayan saw as removing women's individual identity. She said that identity "is deeply linked to several elements of an individual's personality and one's name is integral among these elements". By making women's names public, the work seeks to question women's roles and treatment in Saudi society.

Among Al Dowayan's best-known works is Suspended Together (2011), a series of 200 white fiberglass doves suspended from the ceiling. Each dove, a traditional symbol of freedom, carries a reproduction of the permission-to-travel document that Saudi women were then required to have in order to travel. The document had to be issued and signed by their appointed male guardian, such as a father, brother or husband. The documents Al Dowayan reproduced were sent to her by Saudi women and ranged from six months to sixty years old, recording a history of restrictions on women's rights. Al Dowayan describes the piece: "In this installation of doves, I explore the concept of suspended movement. Many leading women from Saudi, wonderful scientists, educators, engineers, artists and leaders, have donated their papers to be included in this artwork. These women are breaking new ground and achieving for their society, but when it comes to travel they are still treated 'like a flock of suspended doves.'"

Now You See Me, Now You Don't (2020) was commissioned for the first edition of Desert X AlUla. It consists of 12 trampolines set into a desert valley to resemble puddles, which become light-activated after dark. The work addresses water scarcity and remains on permanent public display in AlUla. According to Canvas, it was the first work by a Saudi artist to be permanently installed in public.

Al Dowayan's work O'Sister (2021) was created to mark Saudi women gaining expanded rights in 2017. The work uses text from books published in the 1990s by the Saudi religious establishment that told women how to behave in public.

Shifting Sands: A Battle Song (2024), shown in the National Pavilion of Saudi Arabia at the 60th Venice Biennale, is a participatory multimedia installation built from workshops with Saudi women.

== Performance ==
In 2023, Al Dowayan presented From Shattered Ruins, New Life Shall Bloom in the rotunda of the Solomon R. Guggenheim Museum in New York.

She was the visual director of Thikra: Night of Remembering (2025), a production with the British choreographer Akram Khan. The production has toured internationally, including at the Baku International Arts Festival in 2026.

== Recent work ==
In 2024, two exhibitions of Al Dowayan's work in AlUla marked the pre-opening programme of Wadi AlFann, a planned desert art destination. She is creating a permanent large-scale installation there, titled Oasis of Stories, which was expected to be completed in 2026.

== Exhibitions ==
Al Dowayan's work has been exhibited at the British Museum, the Los Angeles County Museum of Art (LACMA), the Solomon R. Guggenheim Museum in New York, and Mathaf: Arab Museum of Modern Art in Qatar, among others. Her exhibitions include:

- Home Ground, Barjeel Art Foundation (2011), including Suspended Together
- Soft Power, Alan Art Center, Riyadh (2012)
- We Need to Talk, Edge of Arabia, Jeddah (2012)
- Journey of Belonging, solo show, Athr Gallery, Jeddah (2013)
- USA Biennial, Houston (2014)
- Prospect.3: Notes for Now, Prospect New Orleans (2015)
- 100 Masterpieces of Modern and Contemporary Arab Art, Paris (2017)
- The Future of a Promise, Venice Biennale
- Desert X AlUla (2020)
- Shifting Sands: A Battle Song, National Pavilion of Saudi Arabia, 60th Venice Biennale (2024)

== Publications ==
Home Ground Contemporary Art from the Barjeel Art Foundation - Published in Canada in 2015 by The Aga Khan Museum - ISBN 978-1-926473-05-5

Color and Line - The Naqvi Collection - ISBN 978-9948-18-110-1

"Hitting the Road (Driving)" - By Manal AlDowayan - "The Forecast Issue: A View Beyond The Horizon," Issue 07, 2018 - Published by The Monocle Magazine.

"I Am" – By Manal AlDowayan, the "Visual Research and Social Justice" special issue of Studies in Social Justice Journal. Published December 2017.

Imperfect Chronology: Arab Art from the Modern to the Contemporary - Works from the Barjeel Foundation - Edited by Omar Kholeif with Candy Stobbs - Published by Whitechapel Gallery, London, UK, 2015 - ISBN 978-3-7913-5485-9

Do It (in Arabic) - Edited by Hans Ulrich Obrist and Hoor AlQassimi - Published by the Sharjah Art Foundation 2016 - ISBN 978-9948-446-72-9

== Awards and nominations ==
- 2014 Arab Women Awards in Art
- 2019 Al Dowayan was named one of the BBC 100 Women, a list of 100 inspiring and influential women from around the world.
- 2023 Al Dowayan was nominated for the second Richard Mille Art Prize.
