= Akram Khan (politician) =

Indian politician

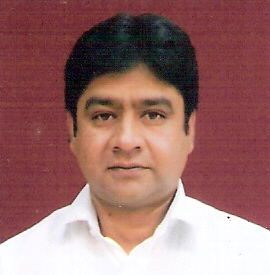
- Akram Khan

Member of the Haryana Legislative Assembly
- Incumbent
- Assumed office 8 October 2024
- Preceded by: Kanwar Pal
- Constituency: Jagadhri
- In office 2009–2014
- Preceded by: Subhash Chand
- Succeeded by: Kanwar Pal
- Constituency: Jagadhri

Deputy Speaker
- In office 5 March 2010 – 26 October 2014
- Constituency: Jagadhri

MOS Home Haryana
- In office 1999–2000
- Constituency: Chhachhrauli

Member of the Haryana Legislative Assembly
- In office 1996–2000
- Preceded by: Mohamad Aslam Khan
- Succeeded by: Kanwar Pal
- Constituency: Chhachhrauli

Personal details
- Born: 10 October 1970 (age 55) Khizri village, Yamunanagar district, Haryana, India
- Party: Indian National Congress
- Spouse: Nahid Khan
- Children: 2 (1 son, 1 daughter)
- Occupation: Politician, agriculturist

Akram Khan (born 10 October 1970) is an Indian politician, a leader of the Indian National Congress (INC) and the Former Minister of State for Home Affairs of Haryana. He became the Deputy Speaker of Haryana in March 2010. In 2009, he became the lone MLA of BSP in Haryana.

== Early life ==
Akram Khan was born to Mohammed Aslam Khan, a renowned politician, in the village of Khizri situated at the northern tip of the Yamunanagar district of Haryana, India. His grandfather Chaudhri Abdul Rashid Khan was also an eminent leader in northern Haryana. He is an alumnus of Colonel Brown Cambridge School, Dehradun. He did his B.A. at Panjab University, Chandigarh.

== Political career ==
After his father died, he continued the family tradition and joined the Indian National Congress but he was denied the ticket from Chhachhrauli in the 1996 elections. He became a rebel and contested election as an independent and became a member of Haryana Vidhan Sabha in 1996 for the first time. In year 1998-1999 he became the Chairman of Housing Board, Haryana in Bansi Lal Government. In the same Government he became the Minister of State for Home Affairs for the year 1999-2000. In 2000 Vidhan Sabha Elections he contested as an independent candidate from Chhachhrauli but got defeated. Despite the defeat he became the Chairman of Haryana Dairy Development & Coop. Federation Ltd for 2000-2004 due to his closeness to the then Chief Minister of Haryana Om Prakash Chautala. In the same Government he was appointed Chairman of Haryana State Electronics Development Corporation Ltd. (HARTRON) in 2004-2005. In 2005 elections he contested elections for the first time on a party ticket through INLD but he lost again to his nearest rival. The years 2005-2009 were the only years of his political career when he was not holding any position in Govt. of Haryana. In year 2007, he switched to Bahujan Samaj Party and contested 2009 elections on their ticket from Jagadhri and won with a huge margin. As he is the only MLA of BSP in Haryana, so the anti-defection law is not valid for him. So, he supported the coalition Government of Hooda and became the second Muslim Deputy Speaker of Haryana Vidhan Sabha after former Ferozepur Jhirka MLA Azad Mohammad on 5 March 2010. He then contested election in 2014 but he lost the elections due to Modi wave. But still he was a runner up securing 40,047 votes.

Akram Khan on 29 March 2019, joined Indian National Congress in presence of Rahul Gandhi, then President of Indian National Congress and Kumari Selja, Rajya Sabha Member (2014-2020).

In 2024 elections, he again contested from Jagadhri Vidhan Sabha and won by a margin of 6,868 votes.
