= Khizri =

Village in Haryana, India

- town
- Location in Haryana, India Khizri (India)
- Coordinates: 30.3175159°N 77.5023544°E
- Country: India
- State: Haryana
- District: Yamunanagar district
- Elevation: 258 m (846 ft)

Population (2019)
  - Total: 3,351

Language - Haryanvi Dialect of Hindi.
  - Official: Hindi
- Time zone: UTC+5:30 (IST)
- ISO 3166 code: IN-HR
- Vehicle registration: HR
- Website: haryana.gov.in

Khizri is a village/hamlet located in Chhachhrauli tehsil of Yamunanagar district in Haryana, India. It is 22 kilometres (14 mi) from the sub-district headquarters at Chhachhrauli and 32 kilometres (20 mi) from the district headquarters at Yamunanagar. It is 106.3 kilometers south-east of Chandigarh and 217 kilometers North of Delhi. According to 2009 statistics, Khizri is a gram panchayat of Khizri village. Population is 3351.

== Geography ==
The geographical area of village is 795 hectares (1,960 acres). Khizri has a total population of 2,317, spread among about 397 houses. The soil here is made of tertiary deposits from small streams of shiwaliks. Soil is sandy and less fertile than other parts of northern plains. Common trees are Sheesham, Sal, khair and bargad. Thorny shrubs can also be found due to presence of sand brought down by streams of shiwalik . Common crops here are Wheat, Rice, Mecca, Pulses, Sugarcane and Bajra. Plantation of Poplar and Safeda can also be found.
