= Indian slide guitar =

Indian slide guitar refers to modified forms of the Hawaiian guitar or lap-steel guitar adapted for performing Hindustani classical music ragas. It was popularised in the 1960s by Brij Bhushan Kabra, whose landmark recording Call of the Valley (1967) with Shivkumar Sharma and Hariprasad Chaurasia introduced the guitar’s fluid glissandi and melodic range to classical audiences.

Following Kabra’s innovations, Indian musicians developed custom slide guitars with extended string sets, sympathetic resonances and modified bridges to reproduce the subtleties of raga performance. Artists such as Debashish Bhattacharya, Debasis Chakroborty, Manilal Nag, and Barun Kumar Pal have expanded its repertoire and technique, integrating the instrument within both classical recitals and contemporary fusion projects.

Performance technique generally involves sitting on the floor with the instrument placed horizontally, a raised nut and bridge, and a steel or glass bar used for continuous pitch slides. These modifications allow characteristic ornaments such as meend (glissando), gamak, and andolan (slow oscillation), bridging the gap between plucked and vocal styles in Hindustani classical music.
