= Debasis Chakroborty =

Indian Slide Guitar player

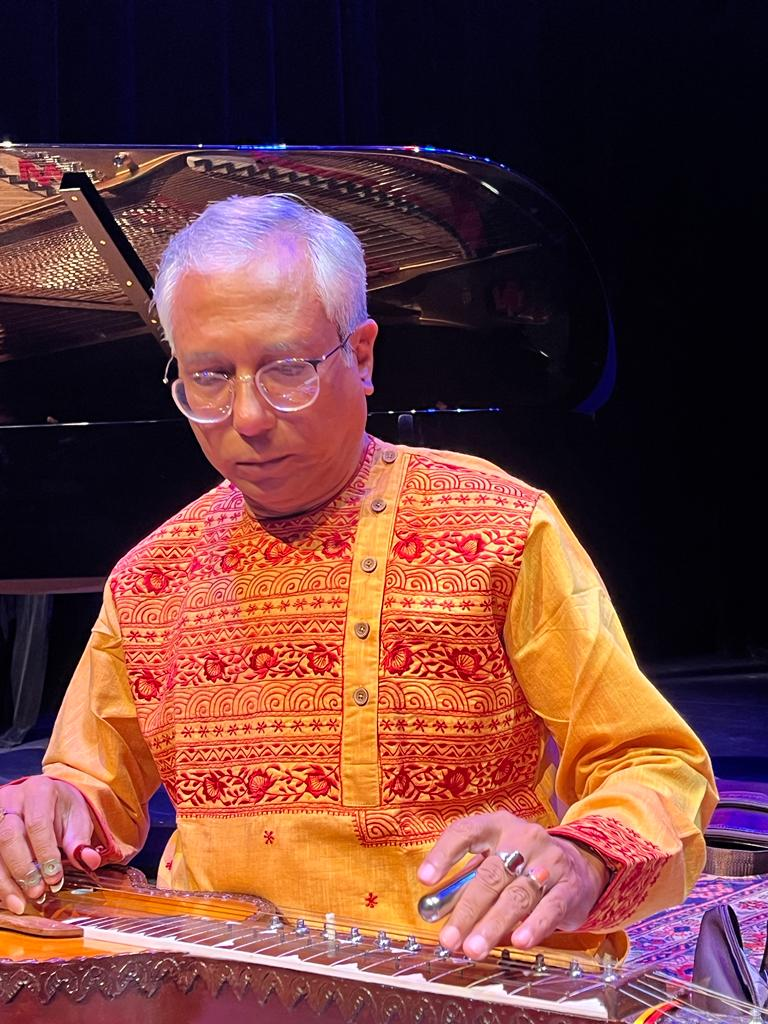

Background information
- Born: 9 June 1961 (age 65); Calcutta, India
- Genres: Indian Slide Guitar; Indian Classical Music; Hindustani Classical Music; World Music
- Occupations: Musician; composer; associate professor
- Instrument: Indian Slide Guitar
- Years active: 1991–present
- Website: debslide.com

Debasis Chakroborty (born 9 June 1961) is an Indian Slide Guitar player from Senia-Maihar Gharana of Hindustani Classical Music.

Chakroborty was born in Calcutta, India, and began learning guitar from his father Sh. Madhusudan Chakroborty. He then came under the tutelage of guitarist Pandit Barun Kumar Pal from Kolkata, and Pandit Jotin Bhattacharya, a sarod player and senior disciple of Ustad Baba Allauddin Khan Sahib of Maihar Gharana. Later on, Debasis became a disciple of the guitarist Pundit Brij Bhushan Kabra.

Debasis's style of playing combines both Gayaki and Tantrakari Angs. He follows the oldest tradition of playing sarode, sitar and veena with his modified Hawaiian guitar, which has a three-octave range.

He is an "A" grade artiste of Prasar Bharati in both Hindustani Classical and light music, and performed in the National programme. He is an ICCR empanelled artiste under the Indian Ministry of External Affairs. He has performed at Monash University in Melbourne, Australia as visiting faculty and artist in residence. At present, he lectures in the Department of Music, Institute of Visual Performing Arts & Research, Mangalayatan University in Aligarh.

== Career ==
Chakroborty continues to perform actively in India and abroad. In recent years, he has been featured as one of the leading artists at the Kala Festival, a UK-based celebration of South Asian music presented by KalaSudha.

He performed in the following editions of the festival:

- Kala Festival 2023 – featured in the launch edition of the festival, which celebrated a month of Indian instrumental music across several UK cities.
- Kala Festival 2025 – featured in the 2025 edition, including concerts and workshops such as “Echoes of Tradition: Indian Slide Guitar, Tabla & Instrumental Duet” (The Bhavan, London, 12 Sept 2025) and “Reading Raga Reasonance” (The Great Hall, Reading, 14 Sept 2025) in which he participated.

Through his Kala Festival appearances, Chakroborty has collaborated with noted artists such as Pandit Sanju Sahai (Tabla), Ustad Akram Khan (Tabla), Deepak Shah (Piano), and Hanif Khan (Tabla), showcasing cross-cultural dialogues between Indian and Western classical instruments.

== Discography ==
- 2012 – " Soul Mate" ecstasy on Slide Guitar, Label: Mountains Meet the Sea Productions-Australia, India, Switzerland

Solo with Sam Evans (Tabla)

- 2008 – Charukeshi, with Robert Burke, Stephen Magnusson, Sam Evans

Associated works

- 2008 – Creatures at the Crossroads, with Gian Slater
- 2010 – Tumbling into the Dawn, with Lior
- 2025 – Concert for Harmony & Peace (Live from Kala Festival 2023), with Raga Pianist Deepak Shah, Lovely Sharma (Sitar), and Durjay Bhaumik (Tabla) – Label: KalaSudha
