= Akram Khan =

Akram Khan may refer to:

- Nawab Sir Muhammad Akram Khan (1868–1907), a former ruler of Amb
- Mohammad Akram Khan (1868–1969), Bengali journalist and politician
- Akram Khan Durrani (born 1958), Pakistani politician
- Akram Khan (cricketer) (born 1968), Bangladeshi cricketer
- Akram Khan (politician) (born 1970), Indian politician
- Akram Khan (dancer) (born 1974), English dancer

== See also ==
- Akram (disambiguation)
- Khan (disambiguation)
