= Disha (disambiguation) =

Disha may refer to

- Disha (film)
- Disha (given name)
- DISHA (spacecraft)
- Tumhari Disha, an Indian television series
