= Chashme Buddoor (1981 film) =

Romantic comedy film by Sai Paranjpye

- Poster
- Directed by: Sai Paranjpye
- Written by: Sai Paranjpye
- Based on: Dhuan Dhuan by Sai Paranjpye
- Produced by: Gul Anand; Jayshree Anand-Makhija
- Starring: Farooq Sheikh; Deepti Naval; Saeed Jaffrey; Rakesh Bedi; Leela Mishra; Ravi Baswani
- Cinematography: Virendra Saini
- Edited by: Om Prakash Makkad
- Music by: Raj Kamal
- Distributed by: PLA Entertainment
- Release date: 8 May 1981
- Running time: 145 minutes
- Country: India
- Language: Hindi

Chashme Buddoor (lit. 'Far be the evil eye', also known as Chashme Baddoor) is a 1981 Indian Hindi-language romantic comedy film written and directed by Sai Paranjpye, adapted from Paranjpye's teleplay Dhuan Dhuan. The film stars Farooq Sheikh, Deepti Naval, Saeed Jaffrey, Rakesh Bedi, Leela Mishra and Ravi Baswani. The story revolves around three close friends, two of whom (Bedi and Baswani) fall in love at first sight with their neighbour (Naval), but after failing to woo her, and discovering that the third friend (Sheikh) is dating the girl, they vow to end their burgeoning relationship.

After watching Sparsh at a film festival in early 1980, producer Gul Anand, asked its writer/director Paranjpye for an escapist film, who then came up with an idea, based on her Doordarshan teleplay Dhuan Dhuan, which after some input from Anand would form the screenplay. Principal photography took place in Delhi during October–November of 1980. The music was composed by Raj Kamal.

Chashme Buddoor was released on 8 May 1981 to critical and commercial success. The film also received five Filmfare Award nominations. Retrospectively, the film has been analysed for its themes of nostalgia, bachelorhood, romance and parody of Hindi film clichés. The film is considered a classic now, and has since gained a cult following. Two remakes, Malayalam-language Odaruthammava Aalariyam directed by Priyadarshan and Hindi-language Chashme Baddoor directed by David Dhawan, were released in 1984 and 2013, respectively.

== Plot ==
Siddharth Parashar, Omi Sharma and Jai "Jomo" Lakhanpal are close friends and roommates enrolled at Delhi University. While Siddharth is a dedicated student focused on securing a stable future, Omi and Jomo lead a boisterous lifestyle. One day, Omi and Jomo spot their neighbour, Neha Rajan, from their balcony. Enamored, they both try to win her affection, but eventually give up after their efforts fail to impress her.

A few days later, Neha visits their apartment as a door-to-door salesgirl for a washing powder company. Spotting her through the peep hole, Omi and Jomo hide, forcing Siddharth to answer the door. Siddharth, who barely speaks to women, reluctantly lets her give him a demonstration. After sharing a conversation, they begin to date each other, unbeknownst to Omi and Jomo. Meanwhile, Siddharth also gets a job in a company, whose manager happens to be Neha's father, a fact that Siddharth is not aware of. Siddharth and Neha's talks soon turn to marriage.

One day, however, Omi and Jomo accidentally discover Siddharth and Neha together. In a fit of jealousy, they vow to end their relationship, which would also enable them to avenge their humiliations inflicted by her. They character assassinate her in the eyes of Siddharth, leading him to break up with her. Depressed, Siddharth starts ignoring his work, and even offers to resign from the job.

One day, Omi and Jomo discover poison in their flat, which prompts them to mistakenly conclude that Siddharth is considering suicide. Frightened for Siddharth's life, they confess everything to him. Siddharth pays a visit to Neha, who is unresponsive towards the abrupt change in his behaviour.

Seeing Neha's predicament, her grandmother decides to take matters in her own hands and visit Siddharth's flat. Though he happens to be out, Omi and Jomo are there. Together, the trio orchestrate a plan to reunite the couple. As a spate of kidnapping, especially of young girls, is taking place in Delhi, they plot a staged kidnapping of Neha outside a temple. Siddharth is vaguely instructed by Omi and Jomo to be outside the temple, so that he can witness the 'kidnapping,' and save her, which should lead them to reconcile. However, she is kidnapped by the real gang. Siddharth gives chase, and fights them, eventually rescuing her. Siddharth and Neha profess their love for each other and gets married.

== Cast ==
- Farooq Sheikh as Siddharth Parashar: A shy, studious and guileless Delhi University student, aspiring to be an economist, and a close friend of Omi and Jomo, who are also his roommates (Note: Attributed to multiple references)
- Deepti Naval as Neha Rajan: Siddharth, Omi and Jomo's pretty neighbour
- Saeed Jaffrey as Lallan Miyan: The local paan and cigarette stall owner with a heart of gold
- Rakesh Bedi as Omi Sharma: A boisterous Delhi University student, and a close friend of Siddharth and Jomo, who are also his roommates (Note: Attributed to multiple references)
- Leela Mishra as Dadi Amma: Neha's loveable grandmother
- Ravi Baswani as Jai "Jomo" Lakhanpal: A boisterous Delhi University student, and a close friend of Siddharth and Omi, who are also his roommates (Note: Attributed to multiple references)
- Vinod Doshi as Neha's father
- Ranjan Grewal as Neha's brother
- Amitabh Bachchan as himself
- Rekha as herself
- Kimti Anand as the waiter (uncredited)
- Chaman Bagga as the lead kidnapper (uncredited)
- Vinod Nagpal as the music teacher (uncredited)
- Sai Paranjpye as
  - a customer to Lallan Miyan (uncredited)
  - the radio announcer (uncredited)

Alka Nupur and Winnie Joglekar (Paranjpye's daughter) also appeared, though went uncredited for their roles.

== Production ==
=== Development ===
Shortly after getting impressed by her debut film Sparsh at the Tashkent Film Festival that took place during early 1980, producer/distributor Gul Anand asked Sai Paranjpye one evening to meet him to discuss an important matter. They decided to do so at the park in front of her hotel. While having ice-cream with her, and doing rounds of the park, he asked her for a "pure fun, feel-good film with no social message." Paranjpye then proposed a film based on her popular one-hour Doordarshan teleplay, Dhuan Dhuan (lit. 'Full of smoke'), which she wrote in the 1970s, inspired by her disillusionment towards chain-smoking girl-chasing youths, about three chain-smoking college-going friends/roommates, who one by one, try to befriend a girl, whom they saw from their terrace, and all of whose efforts go up in smoke (dhuan), but not before each spin yarns to others. (Note: Attributed to multiple references) In the end, however, they decide to 'let the girl go' so as not to cause animosity among them. Anand liked the idea, but wanted one of the three slackers to be a hero material, "sensible, studious, helpful, hard-working," whose love story should "blossom, not go up in smoke." They agreed upon a month for her to come up with a new outline. Upon returning to India, however, she dismissed the whole episode as typical Hindi film producer fancy, only to later realise that he was being earnest when he called her on the day he said he would call. She apologised, requested for a grace period, and began to work on the idea.

The name of the female lead, Neha, was suggested by the film's lyricist Indu Jain, and Omi was named after Om Prakash Makkad, the film's editor. A well-received one-act comedy, The Soap Fairy, that Paranjpye presented at the Gokhale Hall about a college student who becomes a door-to-door soap salesgirl, in reality itself a popular activity among girls at that time, was the basis for the Chamko scene. Ever since she was a child, Paranjpye had been bothered by actors breaking into a song and running around trees, with no one to question their conduct. That is what prompted her to include the scene where people make fun of Siddharth and Neha when they start to sing. The kidnapping idea could have been inspired by actual kidnapping–murder of two young siblings that took place in the late 1970s Delhi. In the vein of her plays Let's Play House, about three women as paying guests, and Albel, about three murder convicts sharing a prison cell, the film is also about three people of different temperaments living under the same roof. It took ten to fourteen days for her to finish the first draft. Older characters were subsequently added as Anand wanted the film to appeal to a wider demographic, not just younger audiences. Anand's sister, Jayshree Anand-Makhija of PLA Entertainment, joined him as an uncredited producer of the film.

=== Pre-production ===
Farooq Sheikh wanted to work under a respected banner, when Anand signed him. It was his first comedy film. Coincidentally, he attended a college named Siddharth College of Law once. Poonam Dhillon was originally considered for the role of Neha. Paranjpye wanted Deepti Naval, who was also eager to work with a respected banner, "an actor who did not look larger than life, rather someone who the youth of the country would relate to," who was then eventually cast. Naval saw her real self as far more stronger than her character. The washing powder Chamko, which Naval's character sells, was actually a brand available in the market at that time. Amid photos of writers, philosophers and world leaders, Siddharth's wall also features a black-and-white candid shot of Naval.

Saeed Jaffrey, a London-based BBC and West End play actor, was looking for a suitable break in Hindi film industry, when Anand offered him a role in the film. He spent time with 50-something paan-kiosk owners of Old Delhi (particularly the Jama Masjid area) in honing his character, "to observe the body language, mannerisms, language and its nuances," Paranjpye wrote. He was also very particular about his character's name. Names such as Lachhan, Fumman, Gulshan, Jumman, Dadoo and Babban were rejected, until one day the name Lallan came to him. He was actually taken for a real paanwala (paan vendor), as someone tried buying paan from him. The paan stall was erected by a tobacco company. That is why cigarettes and tobacco of the company's brand was displayed across its walls.

When then-recent FTII-graduate Rakesh Bedi was told by his batchmate Virendra Saini, the film's cinematographer, about the role, he went and heard the character. Anand recommended Bedi to Paranjpye; she saw some footage of his class exercises and selected him. Bedi contributed "a little bit of sher o shayri" to the script, given that he was interested in Urdu poetry. Like his character, he also used to have a bachelor pad. The coconut ashtray was his idea, as he used to carve ashtrays out of coconut shells for the smokers in his bachelor pad. Paranjpye was adamant on casting Leela Mishra. Strict about her payment, she ended up being the only actor in the film who was paid her usual fees, that of ₹1,000 (equivalent to ₹22,000 or US$240 in 2026) per day.

Naseeruddin Shah, who had known Ravi Baswani from the latter's theatre days, was visiting Delhi when Baswani happened to read Paranjpye's script for Sparsh. Impressed, Baswani begged Shah to recruit him as his spot boy, eventually getting hired for props. Baswani liked to joke that Paranjpye offered him Chashme Buddoor as a "bonus" for his backstage work in Sparsh. In reality, when Baswani's name came up during casting, Paranjpye wrote him a letter asking for his immediate reply, so she could stop her scouting. It was his acting debut. He was only paid ₹3,000 (equivalent to ₹67,000 or US$720 in 2026) for his one month work. Vinod Doshi, Paranjpye's friend, was the chairman of a company, while Kimti Anand and Vinod Nagpal had a background in theatre and Doordarshan serials. Chaman Bagga, an old Doordarshan colleague of Paranjpye, agreed to play the lead kidnapper when she asked him, on the promise that she'd make him the lead in her next film.

When Paranjpye explained the song situations to Indu Jain, she came up with the lyrics, but since Jain was in Japan, she had to dictate the lyrics through the telephone, and Paranjpye had to write them down. Paranjpye was initially skeptical regarding Raj Kamal's music, who was Anand's discovery, but ended up pleased with his work on the film.

Anand was against the original title, Dhuan Dhuan, as it seemed to imply to him that the money spent behind the film will go up in smoke. Paranjpye was initially not pleased about the fact that the "catchy, short and meaningful" title was to be changed. Among others, Diva Swapna (lit. 'Daydream') was also briefly considered as the title of the film. One day, Paranjpye and Anand witnessed someone using the expression chashme buddoor on a little girl dressed up for a school dance. Both of them decided on the spot to title the film based on the expression. Additionally, she also thought that people would be familiar with the term because of the popular song "Chashme Buddoor". Though, those of her friends unfamiliar with Urdu phraseology, referred to the title as Chashme Bahaddoor. (Note: Bahaddoor being a satirical misspelling of Bahadur (lit. 'Brave')) She ended up being proud of the film's eventual title.

Wanting to locate a typical barsaati (terrace flat), Paranjpye found a flat in Defence Colony, with a roomy hall, a terrace and a staircase, that was used as Siddharth, Omi and Jomo's place. The film unit ended up staying in that very flat, though Paranjpye stayed at a friend's mansion in Golf Links. Neha's home, featuring a garden, was found in Vasant Vihar, South Delhi. Paranjpye, however, took liberties with space, implying that Neha lived walking distance from the three men.

=== Filming ===
Principal photography took place in Delhi during October–November of 1980. The open garden restaurant scenes were shot at a cafeteria (since gone) on top of a hillock in Talkatora Garden. Siddharth, Omi and Jomo meet outside Central Cottage Industries Emporium, Janpath, Connaught Place (since relocated); the three of them were flying balloons in the garden surrounding India Gate; the three of them could be seen passing Purana Qila on their bike; Jomo leaving the clinic after getting beaten was shot in Khan Market; Siddharth picks Neha in Mandi House; Lutyens' Delhi could be seen during the motorcycle rides of Siddharth and Neha; the paan stall was located in Nizamuddin East, Mathura Road, South Delhi; Omi's dream sequence was filmed on Badkhal Lake, Faridabad, just across the Delhi border; Siddharth and Neha's duet, too, was filmed on the outskirts of Delhi, in a Surajkund park; and the climax was filmed on the slopes of Tughlaqabad Fort. (Note: Attributed to multiple references) Hauz Khas, Okhla, Adhchini and Mehrauli were also among shooting locations of the film. Paranjpye's friend, whose mansion she stayed in, let her shoot some scenes in his office.

Paranjpye used to cut Sheikh's shots right after he would raise the cigarette to his lips, as he was a non-smoker. When a light boy fell from the roof fixing lights in Defence Colony, and he has to be admitted to a hospital, Sheikh visited him quietly every day, bringing fruits and biscuits to him, and also paid for his tonics. Whenever Sheikh had to go to Kolkata during shoot, he brought Paranjpye mishti doi, her favourite sweet.

Meena Kumari, Zeenat Aman, Sadhana, Nutan, Asha Parekh, Nargis, Sharmila Tagore, Rajesh Khanna, Dilip Kumar, Dev Anand and Shammi Kapoor were parodied during Omi's fantasy scene where Neha auditions for him. When it came time for Naval to parody the bouncy "Aaja Aaja", she got cold feet, and refused to do the dance, or wear the wig. A heated argument between Paranjpye and Naval followed. Trusting the parody sequence so much so that he did not mind additional expense, Anand brought a choreographer to help Naval. Coincidentally, the choreographer was one of the background dancers in "Aaja Aaja". Naval's rehearsals took place at a Juhu hotel, and she ended up finishing the rest of the sequence effortlessly. For the Chamko scene, Paranjpye instructed Naval to "keep a demure frame," let out only "half a smile," and be presentable. She enjoyed playing the character.

After spotting a man during a shoot walking by in a huge yellow Taj Mahal-printed purple lungi, Jaffrey decided that his character would wear it, who then proceeded to make the spot boy take that man's lungi off in order to wear it himself, which he did, and the shooting continued. Bedi was simultaneously shooting for the film Apna Bana Lo (1982), where his character was clean shaven, and Chashme Buddoor, where his character Omi sported a thin-line moustache. To circumvent this, he'd go to the washroom and draw a line with pencil a few inches above his lips before each shoot of the latter film. One day, while he was wiping his face, half of the line got erased; he only found out when his fellow IPTA-mate Sheikh could not control his laughter. Paranjpye was furious at this, apparently. Although, according to Bedi, he has doubts whether Paranjpye ever got to know about it, as when Sheikh pointed out to Bedi his "blunder," he drew the line again.

A bhajan scene was being filmed in Kalkaji Mandir with Naval and Mishra, when four thousand villagers, wanting to see the shooting, started coming up to the temple. In order to finish the shoot peacefully, the production manager bolted all the doors and windows. The bhajan was shot to the accompaniment of bangings. When the unit came out, they got surrounded by the angry villagers, who began to pelt their car with stones, when Paranjpye, Naval and Mishra managed to get to their car. Some villagers even gave them chase through their motorbikes. It was only when Mishra advised the driver to head towards the police station, the chasers stopped. Paranjpye considers this to be the scariest episode of her career. The scene, however, was cut anyway, to trim the length of the film. The scene of the grandmother climbing stairs, and muttering dialogues was done in a single take.

When Jomo meets Neha for the first time, he introduces himself as director D. Lakhanpal. This was a reference to Dinesh Lakhanpal, who was the assistant director of the film. In a scene, Jomo could be seen wearing a Shri Ram College of Commerce jacket. Taking their lesson from the temple incident, the climax was shot under police supervision. The onlookers there turned out to be less intrusive, and the shooting went without a mishap. The film was not improvised at all, according to Naval, though Bedi claimed that he improvised "quite a bit."

=== Post-production ===
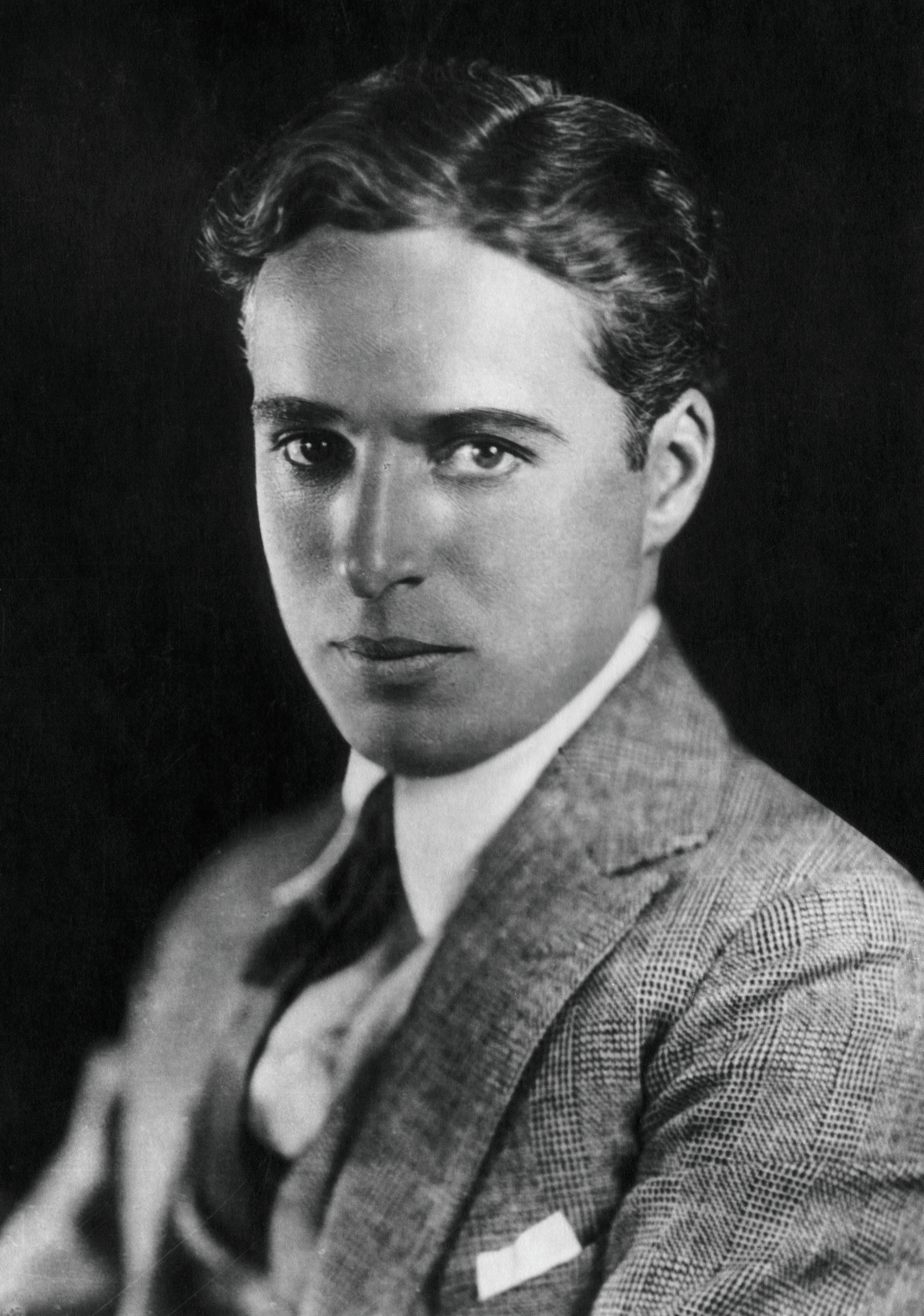
Paranjpye acknowledged the influence of Charlie Chaplin (pictured).

Dubbing took place in Rajkamal Studios. The scene of Omi retreating to a municipal park was originally filmed in a romantic fairy-tale ambiance, but the sound was changed into caw-caw of the crow on the actual version and the warbling of a cuckoo on the dream version after the input of the sound mixer. Adding the radio announcer before "Dost Dost Na Raha" was also his idea. He instructed Paranjpye to get an A-list dubber, whom he would record on that very afternoon. When he asked her about it later, she told him instead to let her give a try. Reluctantly, he permitted. Paranjpye managed to impress him on her very first take. It took only five days to finish the sound mixing. The title sequence was animated by Ram Mohan, who in wanting the sequence to be as unusual as the film itself, animated photographs of the cast as well as Mahatma Gandhi, Albert Einstein and George Bernard Shaw, among others. The film was edited on a Steenbeck. The physical and mental strain of her work took a toll during a particularly hot day, when Paranjpye fainted, and had to be admitted to a hospital. Anand took care of her expenses, on a loan basis. It took her a fortnight to recover. During that time period, Anand halted work on the film, as he did not want anyone to interfere with her work.

The film originally featured a different ending which was discarded because Anand thought that it was not commercially viable. Paranjpye acknowledged the influence of sophisticated American comedies and the works of Charlie Chaplin on the film. Even though expressing admiration for Hrishikesh Mukherjee, she admitted that neither him nor any other contemporaries of her influenced the production. Coincidentally, Mukherjee, then-chairman of the board, ended up being the signatory on the film's censor certificate. It was Paranjpye's second film to be completed, but the first to be released, because Basu Bhattacharya, producer of her debut film Sparsh, did not choose to release his film theatrically until 1984. Because of this, many assume Chashme Buddoor to be her film debut. Much like Sparsh, Paranjpye was not compensated adequately for Chashme Buddoor, even after getting a bonus.

== Soundtrack ==
Chashme Buddoor

Studio album by Raj Kamal
- Released: 1981
- Genre: Feature film soundtrack
- Label: HMV
- Producers: Gul Anand, Jayshree Anand-Makhija

Raj Kamal chronology
Payal Ki Jhankaar (1980)	Chashme Buddoor (1981)	Katha (1983)

All the songs were composed by Raj Kamal and penned by Indu Jain. For "Pyaar, Lagawat, Pranay, Mohabbat", Paranjpye wanted each of the trio to reflect their "individual style by singing different words in a different tune as they cruise the city." "Kahan Se Aaye Badra" and "Kaali Ghodi Dwar Khadi" were semi-classical songs, featuring raga Malhar and raga Megh, and raga Kafi, respectively, with "Kaali Ghodi" (lit. 'Black mare') being a stand-in for the motorbike in the latter. (Note: Attributed to multiple references) Gyan was a music assistant on the film.

=== Track listing ===
All tracks are written by Indu Jain.

No.	Title	Singer(s)	Length
1.	"Kahan Se Aaye Badra"	K. J. Yesudas, Haimanti Sukla	7:38
2.	"Is Nadi Ko Mera"	Shailendra Singh, Haimanti Sukla	5:50
3.	"Kaali Ghodi Dwar Khadi"	K. J. Yesudas, Haimanti Sukla	5:36
4.	"Aansoo Ki Aarti"	Haimanti Sukla	3:26
5.	"Kaise Ho Pagal"	Raj Kamal, Haimanti Sukla	5:00
6.	"Pyaar, Lagawat, Pranay, Mohabbat"	Anand Kumar C., Shailendra Singh, Hariharan	4:38

In addition, Mehdi Hassan's "Ye Dhuaan Sa Kahan Se Uttha Hai" opens the film, "Hum Tum Ek Kamre Mein Band Ho" plays on the radio when Siddharth and Neha first meet, and "Dost Dost Na Raha" plays on the radio in the Udupi restaurant, where Omi and Jomo goes.

Furthermore, "Pyar Kiya To Darna Kya", "Aap Jaisa Koi", "Tumne Pukara Aur Hum Chale Aaye", "Chhod Do Aanchal, Zamana Kya Kahega", "Na Jao Saiyan", "Aaja Aaja" and "Ab Chahe Maa Roothe Ya Baba" were parodied in "The Parody Song" (3:37).

=== Reception ===
The songs were generally praised by Chander Uday Singh. They were praised by Bollywood Hungama too, particularly "Kahan Se Aaye Badra" and the parody song, finding the latter to be hilariously executed. Vijay Lokapally, too, praised "Kahan Se Aaye Badra," and "Kaali Ghodi Dwar Khadi," though he deemed "Pyaar, Lagawat, Pranay, Mohabbat" mindless. The parody song and the score were praised by Namrata Joshi, the latter as "suitably deafening." Anupama Chopra found "Is Nadi Ko Mera" lilting. Ashok Ranade wrote that the film would have work without music too.

== Release ==
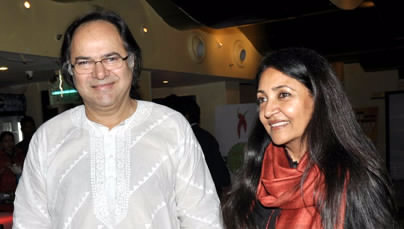
Farooq Sheikh (left) and Deepti Naval (right) in 2013. The year marked their final collaboration in the form of Listen... Amaya.

Chashme Buddoor was released on 8 May 1981. Despite the lack of major actors and singers, and having made on a minuscule budget, the independent film became a surprise silver jubilee hit. (Note: Attributed to multiple references) The film also received positive reviews from critics and audiences.

Singh praised the performances of Sheikh, Bedi, Baswani and Jaffrey, finding the latter to be superb, and wrote that "his acting lifts the movie out of any mundane slots it might have dropped into." In contrast, Naval "carries off the part of a dull, unexposed, home-loving girl a little too well" for him. Even though he deemed the plot formulaic, he still found the film funny, particularly praising Omi's fantasy scene, when Neha auditions for him. He believed the film to be influenced by Hrishikesh Mukherjee. Randhir Kapoor praised the film too.

Paranjpye did not expect to win "even half an award," as she believed comedy films often get overlooked. At the 29th Filmfare Awards, the film received five nominations: Best Film, Best Director (Paranjpye), Best Supporting Actor (Jaffrey), and two nominations for Best Comedian (Bedi and Baswani), but failed to win any.

The title sequence and the Chamko scene gained popularity (with some detergent companies naming their brands Chamko); the parody song inspired a few imitations of its own; Paranjpye began to get accosted by both major and independent production houses, and audiences began to recognise her name; and Naval became a role model for young girls, getting the moniker of Miss Chamko, with Neha becoming a popular name for babies in the 1980s. (Note: Attributed to multiple references) It was the first collaboration between Sheikh and Naval, who went on to make Saath Saath (1982), Katha (1983), Kissi Se Na Kehna (1983), Rang Birangi (1983), Faasle (1985), Tell Me O Kkhuda (2011) and Listen... Amaya (2013) together, with Katha, being a spiritual sequel to Chashme Buddoor, also directed by Paranjpye. Their pairing is seen as one of the most iconic and beloved in Hindi cinema. According to Amborish Roychoudhury, Baswani was cast in Jaane Bhi Do Yaaro (1983) based on his performance in the film.

After the success of the film, Anand expressed to Paranjpye his intention to make a sequel with the same cast and crew returning, but uninterested with the idea, she passed on the project. He then proceeded to contact Jain to write the script, but nothing came of his efforts.

== Themes ==
Describing her film as a heartfelt tribute and a love letter to Delhi, Paranjpye wrote that the film would explore "the length and breadth of the beautiful city and lay bare its soul." Bedi, who hails from Delhi, said that Delhi was a character in the film, and that he has not seen Delhi "so participative in a film. Films may have been shot there, but without naming the places or going overboard in showing the locations; the beautifully picturised city became an integral part of the narrative." Aditya Arya, still photographer for the film, said, "Delhi was like a village before that." The film, shot right before, "will remain a visual-history lesson of what Delhi used to look like." Joshi said that "it makes you long for Delhi of the '80s, quiet and laidback." Diptakirti Chaudhri wrote that the film had "an old-world charm around it, along with a sheen of fantasy," and that in the film, Delhi was "spacious, misty and had an air of wistfulness about it." Chopra found the film tailor-made for evoking nostalgia with its lush trees and greenery. Aseem Chhabra has called the film "an ode to Delhi long gone." Elaborating, he said that Defence Colony, where the three friends shared a barsaati, "is now home to expats – journalists working for foreign publications, diplomats, and Indians with strong business ties. Students like Siddharth, Jai, and Omi cannot imagine living in Defence Colony now;" the garden surrounding India Gate, where the three friends were flying balloons, "is now a restricted area as the government has dug up most of green space for the planned Central Vista Redevelopment Project;" Mathura Road, where the paan stall was erected, used to be practically empty. Though, counterpointing, he argued that through the kidnappings, Paranjpye was "definitely hinting at the fact that all was not well in the serene Delhi she presented to the audience."

To Roychoudhury, romance in the film was of the most innocent form, and therefore more corruptible. Joshi found the theme of "friendship, jealousies and misunderstandings coming in the way of love" timeless, and called the film about the times when "jaunty young men could fall for girls in two-plait hairstyle." Subhash K. Jha wrote that the film "harks back to that era of innocence when college students chased girls all across town hoping to get them to agree to a coffee or a movie. Sex, if at all, was never discussed," commenting further that Siddharth and Neha decide to forge a relationship "probably because they haven't met too many potential soul-mates to choose from." Nivedita Mishra said, Sheikh and Naval was what "middle-class romantic couples looked like, even the college going ones. There was warmth, friendship and an innate civility about their onscreen romance." Arushi Jain pointed out how Siddharth had "nothing heroic about him. He is no pushover when he tries to woo." Although, Siddharth pushing Neha to quit her job was seen as a red flag by her. Attracted by his clumsiness in wooing Neha, Chopra found Siddharth to be "the kind of man every woman can feel safe with, which is perhaps why within five minutes of meeting him, she gives him the details of her music classes so he can meet her again," contrasting the scene of a lone Neha in a stranger's apartment with a similar situation in a 2020s film, and characterising the latter as unsettling. She also noted how Omi and Jomo pursue women to no avail, but idealist Siddharth, who "barely speaks to women because he is so immersed in study," succeeds in finding love.

According to Lokapally, the film captures the essence of bachelor life with the room-sharing experience "when it was a necessity in student life." Similarly, Filmfare found it insightful about young men at the time. To Roychoudhury, the film was about "exuberance and impishness" of youth. Jha deemed the film a window into the middle-class life. Each wall of their room was decorated to the central trio's preference. Omi's had Urdu shayaris splashed across it, film buff Jomo's wall was plastered with pin-ups of superstars of the screen (including a nude), while Siddharth's wall displayed photos of writers, philosophers and world leaders. The trio smoking all through the film were seen by Jha as "a sign of those relatively innocent times when youngsters smoked because they thought they looked cool doing so." Bollywood Hungama noted that the trio survived more on cigarettes than food. There are half-smoked cigarettes and coconut shell ashtrays in their room. Siddharth offers Neha a homemade laddu in a coffee mug instead of in a proper utensil.

Paranjpye made fun of several tropes of mainstream Hindi films. When Omi fails to befriend Neha, he makes up a story of himself as a poet, with Neha on a boat. Jomo passes himself off as beaten up by goons, who were trying to kidnap Neha. Omi begs the villain to leave him in the name of God. Jomo fails to replicate Bachchan's success, when he tried the same method that Bachchan employed to flirt up Rekha. Siddharth and Neha, making fun of Hindi film lovers breaking into a song in a park, get laughed at by the park regulars themselves when they attempt a duet. When the waiter was told to come back later, he says that he will be back after interval, at the stroke of actual interval of the film. A woman's hands replaces a man's in the director credit during the titles. A song, in which the trio travel around on a motorbike sightseeing Delhi, ends in an anti-climax as a policeman hands them a ticket for riding in a group of three.

Protagonists' "cheesy pick-up lines" were never offensive, Jha commented, and that Paranjpye made the art of picking up girls "look decent." Lokapally wrote, "those were times when stalking did not exist." When Jomo exclaims girl, "there is no malice in his intent." "Terms like voyeurism were unknown then," according to Bedi. To Roychoudhury, the film existed in a world "where even eveteasers look innocent and loveable." In contrast, Chopra cited Omi and Jomo as "stalkers and liars who falsely malign a woman because they made no headway in their pursuit of her." Jain went so far as to label the supporting characters voyeuristic and the film casually sexist.

According to Mahmood Farooqui, the film was about nothingness. Chopra, too, deemed it devoid of logic. Jha, in case, pointed out the characters, who despite inhabiting the middle-income group, are untouched by suffering, and how the film is "strewn with a warm bonhomie that suggests a sense of equilibrium in the universe even when human intentions are far from legitimate or sensible."

Roychoudhury noted that Siddharth reflected Sheikh in many ways, as "nobody has to speak" ill about Sheikh, for unlike many cynical film personalities, he "would ask after the well-being of everyone," from colleagues to cook. Although, unlike his character, he never smoked in real life.

Jain contrasted Siddharth inviting Neha in with the generation that "can't look up from their phones for a second – let alone invite someone in for five minutes."

== Legacy ==
Chashme Buddoor is considered a classic now. It has been called one of the best Hindi comedy films of all-time, and among the most iconic films of the 1980s and comedy genre. (Note: Attributed to multiple references)

Reviewers identified the film as either a buddy film, a romantic comedy, a comedy, a parody, a spoof film or a middle-of-the-road film. (Note: Originating between the late 1960s and 1970s, the middle-of-the road genre of films refers to those Hindi films that tried to introduce the sensitivities of Indian literature without sacrificing their commercial appeal.) (Note: Attributed to multiple references) Samira Sood believed that Paranjpye's direction helped the supporting characters be part of the narrative in a way that could have been merely distracting in other films. Many publications found the simple and straight-forward writing to belie clever, nuanced and genuinely funny elements beneath it. (Note: Attributed to multiple references) In contrast, the writing was only "well-intended" for Jain. The cast performances were praised by Jha and Joshi. Each actor embraced their character with the "conviction of permanent ownership," said Jha. Though Jain was less positive, feeling the performances were merely "well-meaning." Sheikh's performance, radiating decency and restraint, was praised by Chopra and Business Standard as perfect, though Lokapally found him less compelling than usual on account of his subduedness. Some consider this performance as one of his best. Naval "delivers superbly," per Lokapally. Sheikh and Naval's chemistry was praised by Jha and Lokapally, stating that they convincingly appealed as an ideal pair. Jaffrey was praised by Chopra, Lokapally and Sood as terrific and winning, who made his small role large and memorable. Bedi's performance was praised by Lokapally and Business Standard as effortlessly humorous. Baswani was praised by many reviewers. Shaikh Ayaz believed his performance to be essential, and Tanushree Ghosh labelled him the funny bone of the film. (Note: Attributed to multiple references) Bachchan and Rekha's chemistry was praised by Bollywood Hungama and Roychoudhury. Anand was also praised for his small role.

Filmfare, Bollywood Hungama and Maithili Rao wrote that the film was funny, and its humour was innovative and heartfelt. The setting was familiar and identifiable for Bollywood Hungama and Rumi Jaffery. Bollywood Hungama praised its lack of "jerky, over smart camera movements." Joshi and Bollywood Hungama found the pace unhurried. The climax was considered "deliberately over-the-top" by Joshi. Chopra and Jain saw certain scenes as problematic: Omi and Jomo chasing women, and designating them as prey; the duo falsely maligning a woman; the duo checking out a girl; Neha's grandmother participating in having Neha mock-kidnapped; Siddharth pushing Neha to quit her job. Jain went so far as to proclaim that one cannot ignore sexism, stalking, possessive behaviour, and voyeurism in the film even if it is considered a classic. Joshi and Sood noted the film's level of detail. "Right down to the banal chore of the grandmother: filling achaar from a huge martbaan (lit. 'jar') into a small bottle," Joshi said. Comparisons were made to Seinfeld, Jaane Bhi Do Yaaro, Indru Poi Naalai Vaa, and the comedies of Mukherjee. (Note: Attributed to multiple references)

India Today referred to Siddharth as having the wardrobe of a male model. To Mimansa Shekhar, Neha was a reference point for middle-class girl-next-door, and still remains one of the most popular female characters. According to Bollywood Hungama, the film showed that parallel and mainstream elements "both can co-exist" in a single film. They also considered the film a precursor to "innumerable films made on male bonding or life-after-college." Similarly, Filmfare labelled it a precursor to parody films. According to Jha, the film set a new benchmark for "burlesque and banter." It has since gained a cult following, and remains enduringly popular.

== Remakes ==
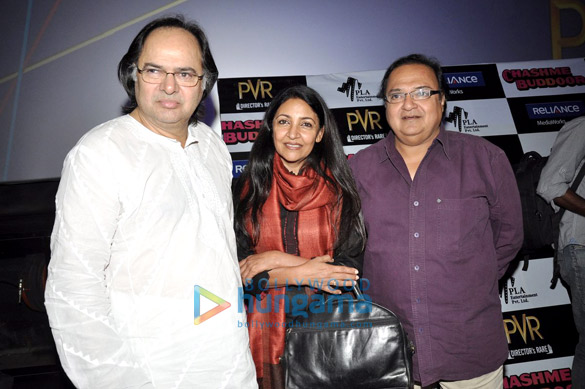
Farooq Sheikh (left), Deepti Naval (center) and Rakesh Bedi (right) at a Chashme Buddoor re-release screening in 2013

A Malayalam-language remake, Odaruthammava Aalariyam, directed by Priyadarshan was released in 1984. Onir was also considering a remake of the film in 2009. Paranjpye was disapproving and reportedly appalled when it was announced that David Dhawan was to helm a Hindi-language remake. Furthermore, as a creative originator of the work, she was liable to be compensated due to a copyright law as soon as the work on the remake began, but PLA Entertainment failed to do so. She approached Film Writers Association, whose then-head Kamlesh Pandey, initially told her not to take the matter into courts, but who later relented after the association failed to intervene to her satisfaction. She did so, and ultimately the matter settled out of court, with Paranjpye getting a decent amount. A digitally restored version of the original Chashme Buddoor was released in 40 screens domestically, alongside its Hindi-language remake Chashme Baddoor, on 5 April 2013, a first for India, when an original film and a remake were released simultaneously. Dhawan's remake was compared unfavourably to the original.

== See also ==
- Nayee Padosan (2003), which shares a similar plot
- List of cult films
- List of Hindi films of 1981
