= Kavita Paudwal =

Indian singer

Kavita Paudwal Tulpule
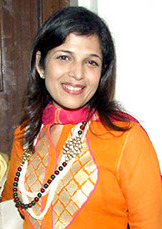

Background information
- Born: Kavita Paudwal; 1974 (age 51–52)
- Genres: Bollywood, Bhajan, Ghazal
- Occupations: Singer, Composer
- Instrument: Vocalist
- Years active: 1984–present
- Labels: T-Series, Times Music, Venus, Shemaroo

Kavita Paudwal Tulpule (born 1974) is an Indian singer. She is known for singing devotional Bhajan songs and has released around 40 music albums, including Gayatri Mantra, Krishna and Lakshmi and Amrutvani. She has been singing devotional songs since 1995. She has lent her voices for hit songs like Haiyya (1995), Mirch Masala (1996), and Julie I love you. She has done playback singing for many Bollywood films, including Tohfa (1984), Junoon (1992), Phool Bane Patthar (1998), Bhavna (1984), and Angaaray (1998).

She sings predominantly in Hindi lanugauge films and music albums but has also sung in Tamil, Telugu, Bengali, Kannada, Marathi, Gujarati, Nepali, Malayalam, Oriya, Bhojpuri and other Indian languages.

== Early life and education ==
Paudwal holds a commerce degree from Narsee Monjee College of Commerce and Economics, Mumbai. She completed her master's degree in interactive media from Tisch School of Arts, New York University. She was trained in Hindustani classical music by Pandit Jialal Vasant and Suresh Wadkar and her parents Arun Paudwal and Anuradha Paudwal.

== Career ==
At the age of 13, she debuted as a playback singer from Mahesh Bhatt's film Junoon. By the time Kavita was 16, she had composed music for two films. Kavita has given her voice to various film composers like A. R. Rahman, Lakshmikant-Pyarelal, Anu Malik, Bappi Lahiri. She has done playback singing for actresses like Kajol, Aishwarya Rai Bachchan, Sonali Bendre, Pooja Bhatt. She has launched 40 devotional music CDs with T-Series. She has sung with co-singers like Hariharan, Sonu Nigam, Javed Ali and Shaan.

Paudwal has done playback singing for the film such as Tohfa (1984), Bhavna (1984), Amchyasarkhe Aamich (1990), Jamla Ho Jamla (1995), Phool Bane Patthar (1998), Ratchagan (1997), Minsara Kanavu (1997), Krantikari (1997), Angaaray (1998), Love You Hamesha (2001) and Heroine No 1(2001).

In November 2019, she collaborated with Pankaj Udhas for a Marathi Bhavgeet single, titled Ranga Dhanoocha Zhula.

== Discography ==
As playback singer

| Year | Film | Credit |
|---|---|---|
| 2010 | Tu Hamar Saathi Re | Singer |
| 2001 | Heroine No 1 | Singer |
| 2001 | Love You Hamesha | Singer |
| 2001 | Zindagi | Singer |
| 1998 | Angaaray | Singer |
| 1997 | Krantikari | Singer |
| 1997 | Minsara Kanavu | Singer |
| 1997 | Ratchagan | Singer |
| 1996 | Jai Dakshineshwar Kali Maa | Singer |
| 1998 | Phool Bane Patthar | Singer |
| 1995 | Jamla Ho Jamla | Singer |
| 1993 | Kunku | Music Director |
| 1992 | Junoon | Singer |
| 1990 | Amchyasarkhe Aamich | Singer |
| 1984 | Bhavna | Singer |
| 1984 | Tohfa | Singer |

== Albums ==
| Year | Albums's Name | Label | Artist(s) |
|---|---|---|---|
| 1994 | Jai Tulsi Maiya | T-Series | Kavita Paudwal, Anuradha Paudwal |
| 1994 | Jai Banke Bihari | T-Series | Nitin Mukesh, Kavita Paudwal, Sonu Nigam |
| 1994 | Main Bewfa Nahin | T-Series | Anuradha Paudwal, Kavita Paudwal |
| 1995 | Haiyya | T-Series | Bali Brahmbhatt, Hariharan, Kavita Paudwal |
| 1995 | Jagran Ki Raat | T-Series | Kavita Paudwal |
| 1995 | Jain Stavan | T-Series | Kavita Paudwal, Anuradha Paudwal |
| 1995 | Shri Ghantakarna Mahaveer | T-Series | Anuradha Paudwal, Kavita Paudwal |
| 1995 | Premer Agun | T-Series | Kavita Paudwal |
| 1996 | Haralo Mon Kabe | T-Series | Kavita Paudwal |
| 1996 | Maihar Wali Sharda Maiya | T-Series | Kavita Paudwal |
| 1996 | Mirch Masala | T-Series | Jolly Mukherjee, Kavita Paudwal, Sukhwinder |
| 1996 | Tareef | T-Series | Jaswant Singh and Kavita Paudwal |
| 1996 | Gokul Ke Natkhat Gopal | T-Series | Kavita Paudwal, Sukhwinder, Vipin Sachdeva |
| 1997 | Shambhu Mere Shankar Mere | T-Series | Anuradha Paudwal, Kavita Paudwal |
| 1997 | Chunari Ranga De | T-Series | Ajeet Kumar Akela, Anuradha Paudwal, Kavita Paudwal |
| 1997 | Bol Bam Kanwariya | T-Series | Gautam Kaule, Kavita Paudwal, Vipin Sachdeva |
| 1997 | Maa Ki Sharan Mein | T-Series | Gautam Kole, Kavita Paudwal, Vipin Sachdeva |
| 1997 | Ganga Maiya Var De | T-Series | Anuradha Paudwal, Kavita Paudwal |
| 1997 | Dil To Hai Deewana | T-Series | Kavita Paudwal, Sonu Nigam |
| 1997 | Bidesi Maina | T-Series | Anuradha Paudwal, Babul Supriyo, Kavita Paudwal |
| 1997 | Sankat Harlo Balaji | T-Series | Mahendra Kapoor, Kavita Paudwal, Sonu Nigam |
| 1998 | Pukaro Naam Lek | T-Series | Kavita Paudwal |
| 1998 | Baba Ke Darbar | T-Series | Anuradha Paudwal, Kavita Paudwal, Sunil Chhaila Bihari |
| 1998 | Sachcha Hai Tumhara Darbar Maa | T-Series | Babul Supriyo, Vipin Sachdeva, Kavita Paudwal, Jojo, Nalini |
| 1998 | Happy Birthday Songs | T-Series | Kavita Paudwal, Neha, Paro |
| 1999 | Balya Ganpati | T-Series | Kavita Paudwal, Anuradha Paudwal, Vaishali Samant, Shrikant Narayan, Santosh Nayak |
| 2000 | Om Namo Ganraya | T-Series | Kavita Paudwal |
| 2000 | Aayi Maa Raat Sapne Mein | T-Series | Kavita Paudwal |
| 2000 | Shiv Dhaam | T-Series | Kavita Paudwal, Udit Narayan, Anuradha Paudwal |
| 2001 | Chhath Pooja Ke Geet | T-Series | Anuradha Paudwal, Kavita Paudwal |
| 2001 | Bhakton Ka Rakhna Khyaal Maa | T-Series | Kavita Paudwal |
| 2002 | Datta Guru Datta | Sumeet | Kavita Paudwal, Paurnima Kulkarni, Uttara Kelkar |
| 2003 | Jatadhaari Gangadhaari | T-Series | Kavita Paudwal, Rajeev Chopra, Anuradha Paudwal |
| 2004 | Maiya Rani Ne Bulaya | T-Series | Anuradha Paudwal, Kavita Paudwal, Sandeep Kapoor |
| 2005 | Meri Maiya Pahadonwali | T-Series | Kavita Paudwal, Kumar Pawan |
| 2006 | Bhakti Barsha | T-Series | Kavita Paudwal, Anuradha Paudwal |
| 2009 | Gundicha Jata | T-Series | Anupama Deshpande, Kavita Paudwal, Sonu Nigam |
| 2011 | Navdurga Stuti | T-Series | Anuradha Paudwal, Kavita Paudwal, Sahilendra Bhartti |
| 2011 | Sai Kardo Karam | T-Series | Anuradha Paudwal, Kavita Paudwal, Lokesh Garg |
| 2012 | Damroo Wale Baba | T-Series | Kavita Paudwal, Rajeev Raj Aditya |
| 2012 | Damroo Wale Baba | T-Series | Kavita Paudwal, Rajeev Raj Aditya |
| 2014 | Jago Bansi Wale | WorldWide Records | Hema Sardesai, Kavita Paudwal, Mitalee Singh |
| 2016 | Aarti | T-Series | Kavita Paudwal, Anuradha Paudwal |
| 2016 | Ganesh Prarthana | Yellow Music | Kavita Paudwal, Ravindra Sathe |
| 2016 | Chalo Shiv Ke Dwar | Skylark Infotainment | Kavita Paudwal |
| 2016 | Shree Sai Mantra | Yellow Music | Kavita Paudwal, Suresh Wadkar |
| 2016 | Gauri Ne Var Payo | T-Series | Ashok Sharma, Kavita Paudwal |
| 2017 | Shree Shyam Bandagi | T-Series | Kavita Paudwal, Rasik Pooran Pagal |
| 2017 | Vishwambhari Stuti | Times Music | Kavita Paudwal, Anuradha Paudwal |
| 2018 | Mero Sauro Bhayo Bauro | BBM Series | Kavita Paudwal |
| 2020 | Nachu Kheluya | T-Series | Anuradha Paudwal, Kavita Paudwal, Aditya Paudwal |
| 2020 | Gayatri Jayanti-Gayatri Mantra | T-Series | Anuradha Paudwal, Hemant Joshi, Kavita Paudwal |

== Personal life ==
She is the daughter of Anuradha Paudwal and Arun Paudwal.
