= National Film Award for Best Hindi Feature Film =

Indian film award

- National award for contributions to Indian Cinema
- Awarded for: Best Hindi feature film of the year
- Sponsored by: National Film Development Corporation of India
- Formerly called: President's Silver Medal for Best Feature Film in Hindi (1954–1968); National Film Award for Best Feature Film in Hindi (1969–2021)
- Rewards: Rajat Kamal (Silver Lotus); ₹2,00,000
- First award: 1954
- Most recent winner: Kathal (2023)
- Website: http://dff.gov.in/

The National Film Award for Best Hindi Feature Film is one of the National Film Awards presented annually by the National Film Development Corporation of India. It is one of several awards presented for feature films and awarded with Rajat Kamal (Silver Lotus).

The National Film Awards, established in 1954, are the most prominent film awards in India that merit the best of the Indian cinema. The ceremony also presents awards for films in various regional languages.

Awards for films in seven regional language (Bengali, Hindi, Kannada, Malayalam, Marathi, Tamil and Telugu) started from 2nd National Film Awards which were presented on 21 December 1955. Three awards of "President's Silver Medal for Best Feature Film", "Certificate of Merit for the Second Best Feature Film" and "Certificate of Merit for the Third Best Feature Film" were instituted. The later two certificate awards were discontinued from 15th National Film Awards (1967). Shyam Benegal won the award seven times (most by any director) followed by Hrishikesh Mukherjee who won six times. Since the 70th National Film Awards, the name was changed to "Best Hindi Feature Film".

Directed by Sohrab Modi, the 1954 film Mirza Ghalib was honoured with the first president's silver medal for Best Feature Film in Hindi. The most recent recipient is Gulmohar

== Winners ==
Award includes 'Rajat Kamal' (Silver Lotus Award) and cash prize. Following are the award winners over the years:

Awards legends
| * | President's Silver Medal for Best Feature Film |
| * | Certificate of Merit for the Second Best Feature Film |
| * | Certificate of Merit for the Third Best Feature Film |
| * | Certificate of Merit for the Best Feature Film |
| * | Indicates a joint award for that year |

List of award films, showing the year (award ceremony), producer(s) and director(s)
| Year | Film(s) | Producer(s) | Director(s) | Refs. |
|---|---|---|---|---|
| 1954 (2nd) | Mirza Ghalib | Minerva Moviestone | Sohrab Modi | |
| 1954 (2nd) | Jagriti | Filmistan Ltd. | Satyen Bose | |
| 1955 (3rd) | Jhanak Jhanak Payal Baaje | Rajkamal Kalamandir | V. Shantaram | |
| 1955 (3rd) | Shree 420 | R. K. Films | Raj Kapoor | |
| 1955 (3rd) | Devdas | Bimal Roy Productions | Bimal Roy | |
| 1956 (4th) | Basant Bahar | Shri Vishwa Bharati Films | R. Chandra | |
| 1957 (5th) | Do Aankhen Barah Haath | Rajkamal Kalamandir | V. Shantaram | |
| 1957 (5th) | Mother India | Mehboob Productions | Mehboob Khan | |
| 1957 (5th) | Musafir | Hrishikesh Mukherjee | Hrishikesh Mukherjee | |
| 1958 (6th) | Madhumati | Bimal Roy | Bimal Roy | |
| 1958 (6th) | Lajwanti | Mohan Segal | Narendra Suri | |
| 1958 (6th) | Karigar | Vasant Joglekar | Vasant Joglekar | |
| 1959 (7th) | Anari | Lachman B. Lulla | Hrishikesh Mukherjee | |
| 1960 (8th) | Mughal-e-Azam | K. Asif | K. Asif | |
| 1960 (8th) | Jis Desh Men Ganga Behti Hai | Raj Kapoor | Radhu Karmakar | |
| 1960 (8th) | Kanoon | B. R. Chopra | B. R. Chopra | |
| 1961 (9th) | Dharmputra | B. R. Chopra | Yash Chopra | |
| 1961 (9th) | Gunga Jumna | Dilip Kumar | Nitin Bose | |
| 1961 (9th) | Pyaar Ki Pyaas | Anupam Chitra | Mahesh Kaul | |
| 1962 (10th) | Sahib Bibi Aur Ghulam | Guru Dutt | Abrar Alvi | |
| 1963 (11th) | Bandini | Bimal Roy Productions | Bimal Roy | |
| 1963 (11th) | Mere Mehboob | Harnam Singh Rawail | Harnam Singh Rawail | |
| 1963 (11th) | Gumrah | B. R. Films | B. R. Chopra | |
| 1964 (12th) | Dosti | Tarachand Barjatya | Satyen Bose | |
| 1964 (12th) | Yaadein | Sunil Dutt | Sunil Dutt | |
| 1964 (12th) | Geet Gaya Patharon Ne | V. Shantaram Productions | V. Shantaram | |
| 1965 (13th) | Shaheed | Kewal Kashyap | S. Ram Sharma | |
| 1965 (13th) | Oonche Log | M/S Chitrakala | Phani Majumdar | |
| 1965 (13th) | Guide | Dev Anand | Vijay Anand | |
| 1966 (14th) | Anupama | L. B. Lachman | Hrishikesh Mukherjee | |
| 1967 (15th) | Hamraaz | B. R. Chopra | B. R. Chopra | |
| 1968 (16th) | Aashirwad | Hrishikesh Mukherjee and N. C. Sippy | Hrishikesh Mukherjee | |
| 1969 (17th) | Satyakam | Sher Jeng Singh Punchee | Hrishikesh Mukherjee | |
| 1970 (18th) | Anand | Hrishikesh Mukherjee and N. C. Sippy | Hrishikesh Mukherjee | |
| 1971 (19th) | Phir Bhi | Shivendra Shah | Shivendra Shah | |
| 1972 (20th) | Maya Darpan | Kumar Shahani | Kumar Shahani | |
| 1973 (21st) | 27 Down | Awatar Krishna Kaul | Awatar Krishna Kaul | |
| 1974 (22nd) | No Award | | | |
| 1975 (23rd) | Nishant | Freni M. Variava and Mohan J. Bijlani | Shyam Benegal | |
| 1976 (24th) | Manthan | Gujarat Co-operative Milk Marketing Federation Ltd. | Shyam Benegal | |
| 1977 (25th) | Shatranj Ke Khiladi | Suresh Jindal | Satyajit Ray | |
| 1978 (26th) | Kasturi | Bimal Dutt | Bimal Dutt | |
| 1978 (26th) | Junoon | Shashi Kapoor | Shyam Benegal | |
| 1979 (27th) | Sparsh | Basu Bhattacharya | Sai Paranjpye | |
| 1980 (28th) | Aakrosh | NFDC | Govind Nihalani | |
| 1981 (29th) | Arohan | Government of West Bengal | Shyam Benegal | |
| 1982 (30th) | Katha | Suresh Jindal | Sai Paranjpye | |
| 1983 (31st) | Ardh Satya | Manmohan Shetty and Pradeep Uppoor | Govind Nihalani | |
| 1984 (32nd) | Paar | Swapan Sarkar | Gautam Ghose | |
| 1985 (33rd) | Anantyatra | Nachiket Patwardhan | Nachiket Patwardhan and Jayu Patwardhan | |
| 1986 (34th) | Mirch Masala | NFDC | Ketan Mehta | |
| 1987 (35th) | Pestonjee | NFDC | Vijaya Mehta | |
| 1988 (36th) | Salaam Bombay! | NFDC, Mirabai Films and Doordarshan | Mira Nair | |
| 1989 (37th) | Salim Langde Pe Mat Ro | NFDC | Saeed Akhtar Mirza | |
| 1990 (38th) | Drishti | Govind Nihalani | Govind Nihalani | |
| 1991 (39th) | Diksha | NFDC and Doordarshan | Arun Kaul | |
| 1991 (39th) | Dharavi | NFDC and Doordarshan | Sudhir Mishra | |
| 1992 (40th) | Suraj Ka Satvan Ghoda | NFDC | Shyam Benegal | |
| 1993 (41st) | Patang | Sanjay Sahay and Durba Sahay | Gautam Ghose | |
| 1994 (42nd) | Mammo | NFDC and Doordarshan | Shyam Benegal | |
| 1995 (43rd) | Bandit Queen | Sundeep Singh Bedi | Shekhar Kapur | |
| 1996 (44th) | Gudia | Amit Khanna and Mahesh Bhatt | Gautam Ghose | |
| 1997 (45th) | Hazaar Chaurasi Ki Maa | Govind Nihalani | Govind Nihalani | |
| 1998 (46th) | Godmother | Gramco Films | Vinay Shukla | |
| 1999 (47th) | Shool | Ram Gopal Varma and Nitin Manmohan | E. Nivas | |
| 2000 (48th) | Zubeidaa | Farouq Rattonsey | Shyam Benegal | |
| 2001 (49th) | Dil Chahta Hai | Ritesh Sidhwani | Farhan Akhtar | |
| 2002 (50th) | The Legend of Bhagat Singh | Tips Industries | Rajkumar Santoshi | |
| 2003 (51st) | Raghu Romeo | NFDC | Rajat Kapoor | |
| 2004 (52nd) | Raincoat | Shree Venkatesh Films | Rituparno Ghosh | |
| 2005 (53rd) | Black | Anshuman Swami and Sanjay Leela Bhansali | Sanjay Leela Bhansali | |
| 2006 (54th) | Khosla Ka Ghosla | Savita Raj Hiremath | Dibakar Banerjee | |
| 2007 (55th) | 1971 | Sagar Films | Amrit Sagar | |
| 2008 (56th) | Rock On | Excel Entertainment Pvt. Ltd. | Abhishek Kapoor | |
| 2009 (57th) | Paa | Amitabh Bachchan and Sunil Manchanda | R. Balki | |
| 2010 (58th) | Do Dooni Chaar | Arindam Chaudhuri | Habib Faisal | |
| 2011 (59th) | I Am | Onir and Sanjay Suri | Onir | |
| 2012 (60th) | Filmistaan | Satellite Picture Pvt. Ltd. | Nitin Kakkar | |
| 2013 (61st) | Jolly LLB | Fox Star Studios | Subhash Kapoor | |
| 2014 (62nd) | Queen | Phantom Films and Viacom 18 Motion Pictures | Vikas Bahl | |
| 2015 (63rd) | Dum Laga Ke Haisha | Maneesh Sharma and Yash Raj Films | Sharat Katariya | |
| 2016 (64th) | Neerja | Fox Star Studios India Pvt. Ltd. | Ram Madhvani | |
| 2017 (65th) | Newton | Drishyam Films | Amit V Masurkar | |
| 2018 (66th) | Andhadhun | Viacom18 Motion Pictures | Sriram Raghavan | |
| 2019 (67th) | Chhichhore | Fox Star Studios India and Nadiadwala Grandson Entertainment | Nitesh Tiwari | |
| 2020 (68th) | Toolsidas Junior | T-Series Films and Ashutosh Gowariker Productions | Mridul Mahendra | |
| 2021 (69th) | Sardar Udham | Ronnie Lahiri and Sheel Kumar | Shoojit Sircar | |
| 2022 (70th) | Gulmohar | Star India | Rahul V. Chittella | |
| 2023 (71st) | Kathal | Netflix, Balaji Motion Pictures and Sikhya Entertainment | Yashowardhan Mishra | |
| 2024 (72nd) | Srikanth | T-Series Films, and Chalk & Cheese Films | Tushar Hiranandani | |
