= Chashme Baddoor (2013 film) =

2013 film by David Dhawan

- Theatrical release poster
- Directed by: David Dhawan
- Written by: Sajid-Farhad
- Screenplay by: Renuka Kunzru
- Story by: David Dhawan
- Based on: Chashme Buddoor by Sai Paranjpye
- Produced by: Viacom18 Motion Pictures
- Starring: Ali Zafar; Taapsee Pannu; Divyendu Sharma; Siddharth
- Cinematography: Sanjay F. Gupta
- Edited by: Nitin Rokade
- Music by: Score: Sandeep Shirodkar; Songs: Sajid–Wajid
- Production company: Viacom18 Motion Pictures
- Distributed by: Wave Cinemas Ponty Chadha
- Release date: 5 April 2013
- Running time: 123 minutes
- Country: India
- Language: Hindi
- Budget: ₹20 crore Note: figure includes print and advertising costs
- Box office: ₹ 50 crore

Chashme Baddoor (lit. 'Let the evil eye be far away') is a 2013 Indian Hindi-language slapstick comedy film directed by David Dhawan and written by Sajid and Farhad Samji. An official remake of the 1981 film Chashme Buddoor, it was produced by Viacom 18 Motion Pictures and stars Ali Zafar and Taapsee Pannu (in her Hindi film debut) with Divyenndu and Siddharth in lead roles. The film was released on 5 April 2013.

== Plot ==
Seema Ranjan (Taapsee Pannu) is a young girl who lives in Mumbai with her father Suryakant “Santru” Ranjan (Anupam Kher). He, being an active military officer, wants Seema to marry an armyman. He had arranged Seema's marriage to such people five times in a row, with Seema evading all five arrangements. Her father had now arranged her marriage for the sixth time, which Seema evades again and escapes to Goa to live with her uncle Chandrakant “Chiku” Ranjan, her father’s younger twin brother (also Anupam Kher), who wants her to marry a civilian.

Siddharth “Sid” Kashyap (Ali Zafar), Jai (Siddharth) and Omkar "Omi" Sharma (Divyenndu) are three friends who live in a rented apartment in Goa. Miss Josephine (Lilette Dubey) is their landlady. All three are frequent visitors to a café owned by Joseph Furtado (Rishi Kapoor). The three owe huge amounts of money to Joseph and Josephine. One day, Omi spots Seema taking a walk with her dog. Attracted to her, he calls Jai. Both of them try to impress her. One after the other, they break into Seema's house. Omi tries to impress Seema with his poetry. Meanwhile, Seema mistakes him for a dog trainer and takes him straight into her bedroom. Omi assumes Seema is interested in him and starts browsing her bedroom while Seema prepares her dog. Unable to handle the dog as it bites him, Omi runs back home, where he tells everyone a completely different story. Omi tells his friends that they had sex and were deeply in love. Jealous, Jai tries his luck. Jai breaks in, telling them he is a reputed film-maker. Upon realization, Seema calls her grandmother and makes her beat up Jai until he finally makes his run. Back home, Jai tells a similar story. Jai tells the other two that they were deeply in love and were now dating. Siddharth, meanwhile, isn't interested in Seema.

However, one day, Siddharth accidentally bumps into Seema, unaware of the fact that she is the girl Jai and Omi failed to impress. Both of them chat over lunch. Seema is impressed with Sid and asks him out on a date. Both of them get along very well and date frequently, until one day, Jai and Omi spot them. Both of them, jealous of the fact that they are now dating, tell Sid that she isn't a good girl and ask him to break up with her. Seema, on the other hand is shocked about the fact that they are both Sid's friends. Sid pretends to beat up both his friends to impress Seema, which later turns out to be Omi and Jai's imagination. Albeit their fight, they continue to try and split Sid and Seema. One day, Josephine gets caught in heavy rain. Joseph too was present at the scene and helped out Josephine. Both of them were amused at the similarities between them. They both fall in love but hesitate to start dating. Jai and Omi try to take advantage of the situation. They assume that Joseph would stop asking them to pay the café bills and Josephine would let them stay at her apartment for free if they helped unite them. In their many attempts, they somehow unite Joseph and Josephine. Despite that, Joseph & Josephine still don't forgive the three. So Jai and Omi start lying about each of the two to the other. They get the money they wanted. However, Joseph and Josephine do not break up as they soon realize that all the secrets told to them were lies.

Soon after that, Sid and Seema break up, following successful attempts by Jai and Omi. However, Sid is deeply hurt and gets drunk. Later, one day, Omi and Jai find a poison bottle in Sid's drawer and assume that he has committed suicide even though he hasn't. Realizing that they have made a really big mistake, Jai and Omi try several times to unite Sid and Seema again. But they fail, causing Seema to get frustrated and blame Sid. One day, finally, they go to Seema's house and meet her grandmother. She comes up with a rather filmy solution and suggests that Jai and Omi play kidnappers and supposedly kidnap Seema. Then, the grandmother goes to Sid and asks him to rescue Seema from the kidnappers. Finally, Sid and Seema start dating again. Seema's uncle, who had always been trying to marry Seema to a civilian rather than a military officer, suggests that Seema marry Sid. At the same time, Seema's father turns up trying to take Seema back home. In order to solve the problem, Sid unites the brothers by telling them, that every military officer was once a civilian. The military officer & his brother are impressed and they both let Sid and Seema marry.

== Cast ==
- Ali Zafar as Siddharth Kashyap aka Sid
- Taapsee Pannu as Seema Ranjan
- Divyendu Sharma as Omkar "Omi" Sharma
- Siddharth as Jai Lakhanpal
- Rishi Kapoor as Mr. Joseph Furtado
- Anupam Kher as Suryakant "Santru" Ranjan, Seema's father and Chandrakant "Chiku" Ranjan, Seema's uncle (Double Role)
- Bharati Achrekar as Mrs. Ranjan, Seema's Grandmother
- Ayaz Khan as Major Pratap
- Lilette Dubey as Miss Josephine
- Nikhil Pandey - Cameo
- Ashish Verma as Pinto

== Development ==
Development on the Chashme Baddoor remake began in 2006, with Onir initially attached to the film. David Dhawan was later announced to be directing the film, and Sai Paranjpye, the director of the 1981 film, would be writing the script. Dhawan commented that there would be some changes for the remake, such as the story getting updated to modern day and the remake having a larger budget than the 1981 film.

In 2011 Siddharth was confirmed as portraying Jomo, with Dhawan stating that it was difficult casting the role due to Ravi Baswani's death in 2010 and that he wanted to cast someone that could "do justice to his part". Divyendu Sharma was later announced as performing Omi.

Filming took place in Mauritius, in 2012, with Ali Zafar becoming injured during a fight sequence with Ayaz Khan.

== Soundtrack ==
The songs were composed by the duo Sajid–Wajid and received a positive review from IBN Live which stated that it doesn't have a "dull moment" and brings back "the simple joys of the 1980s".

The film score was composed by Sandeep Shirodkar.

Chashme Baddoor

Soundtrack album by Sajid–Wajid
- Released: 1 January 2013
- Genre: Film soundtrack
- Label: T-Series

Soundtrack	Singer	Lyrics	Back up & Vocals	Remixed By
"Har Ek Friend Kamina Hota Hai"	Sonu Nigam	Kausar Munir	–	–
"Dhichkyaaon Doom Doom"	Ali Zafar, Shreya Ghoshal	Neelesh Misra	–	–
"Early Morning"	Sonu Nigam	Jalees Sherwani	–	–
"Ishq Mohallah"	Mika Singh, Wajid	Neelesh Misra	–	–
"Andha Ghoda Race Mein Dauda"	Wajid, Ali Zafar	Jalees Sherwani	Neuman Pinto	–
"Early Morning" (Remix)	Ali Zafar, Rap by "Limitless"	–	–	Ali Mustafa & Ali Zafar

== Critical reception ==
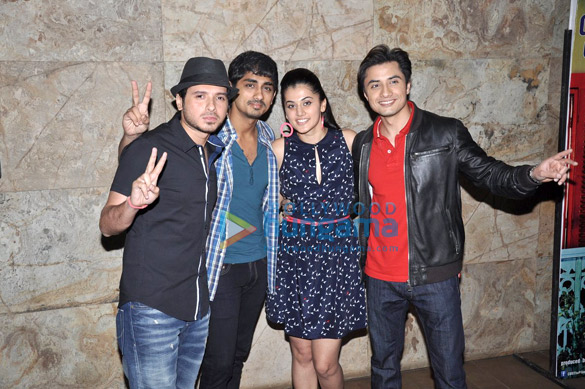
Film cast at a screening event

The movie received mostly positive reviews praising the performances and humour. Taran Adarsh of Bollywood Hungama gave the film a rating of 3.5 out of 5 and said, "An entertainer with dollops of humour and wild situations thrown in, this one's a laugh-riot". Srijana Mitra Das of The Times of India awarded it 3.5 out of 5 stars, stating, "It retains the original's madness, masti and movie-mania". Rajeev Masand of CNN-IBN gave it 2.5 out of 5 stating that the film "doesn't entirely work because Dhawan appears conflicted between taking the characters on a journey of his making, and sticking to the blueprint of the original film." Vinayak Chakravorty of India Today rated it 2.5 out of 5 and wrote, "The gags are simply not funny enough even if you are game to grant the licence of brainlessness". The Deccan Herald stated that the remake is "far(ce) removed" from the original and that "Exclamation marks are the only punctuations in this seamless comedy of courtship played at an impossibly high octave, without getting shrill." Emirates 24/7 stated that "Dhawan has upped his standard, just enough to warrant a trip to the cinemas".

== Box office ==
=== India ===
Chashme Baddoor opened good especially at multiplexes in North India where it collected ₹47.5 million (US$500,000) on its first day. It grew further positively on second day and netted around ₹57.5 million (US$600,000) nett. The film netted very good figures of around ₹183 million (US$1.9 million) over its first weekend. Chasme Bhaddoor earned ₹300 million (US$3.1 million) with a distributor share of around ₹158 million (US$1.7 million) over its first week. The movie grossed ₹390 million (US$4.1 million) in two weeks and finished at around ₹420 million (US$4.4 million) in India and was declared a Blockbuster at box office.

=== Overseas ===
The film collected ₹45 million (US$470,000) from overseas markets in its opening week it did well in Pakistan and UAE markets. The film collected ₹80 million (US$840,000) from overseas markets.
