= Sharaabi =

1984 Indian film by Prakash Mehra

- Movie poster
- Directed by: Prakash Mehra
- Written by: Kader Khan
- Screenplay by: Laxmikant Sharma
- Story by: Prakash Mehra
- Produced by: Satyendra Pal
- Starring: Amitabh Bachchan; Jaya Prada; Pran; Om Prakash; Deepak Parashar; Ranjeet
- Cinematography: N. Satyen
- Edited by: J. Adhikari
- Music by: Bappi Lahiri
- Distributed by: Prakash Mehra Productions
- Release date: 18 May 1984
- Country: India
- Language: Hindi
- Budget: ₹4.5 crore (US$470,000)
- Box office: ₹7.6 crore (US$790,000)

Sharaabi (transl. Drunkard) is a 1984 Indian Hindi-language action comedy film produced and directed by Prakash Mehra. This was Mehra's sixth film with Amitabh Bachchan. The dialogues were written by Kadar Khan. During an interview to film expert Rajesh Subramanian filmmaker Prakash Mehra revealed that the father's role was initially offered to Dilip Kumar but after listening to the bound script the thespian refused citing the character had certain negative traits. Eventually the role was offered to Pran.

Sharaabi stars Bachchan and Jaya Prada, with Pran, Om Prakash and Ranjeet. The music was composed by Bappi Lahiri. It became a super hit at the box office and also third highest grossing film of 1984 behind Maqsad and Tohfa.

The film, which was loosely inspired by the 1981 movie Arthur, was remade in Kannada in 1985 as Nee Thanda Kanike.

== Plot ==
Vicky Kapoor is the only son of billionaire industrialist Ammarnath Kapoor who is growing his business and has no time for his son. Munshi Phoolchand friend of Amarnath is a care taker and in lieu of affection for Vicky. Being ignored by his dad regularly, Vicky is inclined towards becoming alcoholic since his childhood days.

Amarnath blames Munshi for Vicky becoming an alcoholic, but Munshi confronts Amarnath by saying that Vicky's mom died bestowing Vicky to him as Amarnath did not even care to visit his dying wife, and his ignorance has made Vicky an alcoholic. As Munshi is about to leave his job, Vicky swears him to stop. Vicky being nice and polite, he sees an orphan kid Anwar, whose mother died recently and kind of adopts him entrusting the school principal and Munshi to take care of his schooling and bringing him up. Now in adulthood. Anwar becomes a police inspector and is still unaware of his secret angel who has helped him to grow into a successful man. Vicky is now a famous alcoholic but very good at heart and helps random poor and ill children. He helps Abdul, a butcher, and provides medical aid for his kid.

He meets Meena, a professional dancer and the daughter of a poor blind man, and falls in love with her. Her agent Natwar is greedy in gaining Vicky's money and harasses her and her blind father but doing petty theft of the gifts given by Vicky to her. When Amarnath tries to arrange Vicky's marriage he disagrees and Amarnath insults him by stating that poor girl won't marry him. Vicky insults his father in front of all his business and political contacts.

Vicky is framed for being with other girl by Natwar, which makes Amarnath angry and disowns Vicky from his property and money, on which he agrees and Munshi also tags along. Natwar also kidnaps Meena. Anwar realises that Vicky was his secret angel and invites Vicky and Munshi to stay at his home to which Vicky rejects at first but finally visits his home and sees Meena who was rescued by Anwar. Vicky entrusts Anwar that Meena should stay at Anwar's house till he is financially strong. They spend the night sleeping on the footpath. Next morning when Munshi leaves Vicky to find work so that he can earn money and feed both of them, but he gets involved in an accident and dies. Vicky quits alcohol and meets his father during a meeting and asks him to join him in last rights of Munshi Phoolchand, to which Amarnath denies and angry Vicky leaves by declaring him as an orphan as his rightful father Munshi is dead and his biological father is not concerned in anything apart from work.

One of Amarnath's business partners Govardhandas always wanted his daughter to marry Vicky but is always insulted by Vicky in the past, so Govardhandas meets Natwar and pays him money to separate Vicky and Meena.

Abdul, who was helped by Vicky earlier, finds that his son is missing. Natwar meets him and says that kidnappers have kidnapped his son and has demanded that Abdul kills Meena. Abdul shows the kidnappers the dead body of Meena and they return his son back to him.

Vicky hears the death of Meena and fights with Natwar, where he blames that Abdul was the one who has killed Meena upon Govardhandas' orders.

Meanwhile, Amarnath realizes his mistakes and starts missing Vicky. Desperate to see Vicky, Amarnath starts drinking and his business partner along with Govardhandas takes advantage by taking Amarnath's property under their name and planning to kill Amarnath.

Vicky learns about this and confronts Govardhandas and his henchmen to a fight. Vicky is shot by Natwar on his arm but is rescued by Anwar who then arrests Natwar and Govardhandas. Vicky is helped by all his poor people whom he has helped in the past and nabs the remaining goons. Abdul brings Meena to injured Vicky and Amarnath, stating that Vicky has helped his son in past so he would not kill Vicky's love. Amarnath accepts his mistakes and welcomes Meena in his family.

In the end, Vicky opens a housing complex for the poor and homeless and names it Munshi Phoolchand Nagar.

== Cast ==
- Amitabh Bachchan as Vicky Kapoor
- Jaya Prada as Meena
- Ranjeet as Natwar Shah
- Pran as Rai Sahib Amarnath Kapoor
- Om Prakash as Munshi Phoolchand
- Deepak Parashar as Inspector Anwar
- Chandrashekhar as Advocate Saxena
- Ashalata Wabgaonkar as Mrs. Amarnath Kapoor
- Bharat Bhushan as School Master/Principal
- Suresh Oberoi as Abdul
- Mukri as Mr. Nathulal
- Vikas Anand as Mr. Lobo
- A. K. Hangal as Meena's Father
- Satyen Kappu as Seth Govardhandas, Paper King
- Bhushan Tiwari as Mr. Gore
- Sunder as Mr. Khaitaan, Cement King
- Jankidas as Rustomjee Bandookwala
- Viju Khote as Mr. Nahata, Partner of Liquior Factory
- Babban as one amongst the dancers in "Jahan chaar yaar" song
- Smita Patil as guest appearance in the song "Jahan Chaar Yaar Mil Jaye"

== Soundtrack ==
The music of this album is composed by Bappi Lahiri who won the Filmfare Award for Best Music Director. The song "Jahan Chaar Yaar" is inspired from Runa Laila's classic Bengali song "Bondhu Teen Din".

Vocals supplied by Kishore Kumar for Amitabh Bachchan and Asha Bhosle for Jaya Prada. Kumar won his 7th Best Male Playback Singer. Kishore Kumar was only singer nominated for that year for four songs from this album: "De De Pyar De", "Inteha Ho Gayi Intezar Ki", "Log Kehte Hain" and won for the song "Manzilen Apni Jagah Hain".

=== Track listing ===
Song	Singer	Raga
"Jahan Chaar Yaar Mil Jaye, Wahi Raat Ho Gulzar"	Amitabh Bachchan, Kishore Kumar	
"Manzilen Apni Jagah Hain"	Kishore Kumar	
"De De Pyar De" (Male)	Kishore Kumar	Pilu (raga)
"Mujhe Naulakha Manga De Re, O Saiyaan Deewane"	Kishore Kumar, Asha Bhosle	Pilu (raga)
"Inteha Ho Gayi Intezar Ki, Aayi Na Kuch Khabar"	Kishore Kumar, Asha Bhosle	Madhukauns
"De De Pyar De" (Female)	Asha Bhosle	Pilu (raga)
"Log kehte Hain"	Kishore Kumar	Yaman Kalyan

== Awards ==
32nd Filmfare Awards:

Won

- Best Music Director – Bappi Lahiri
- Best Male Playback Singer – Kishore Kumar for "Manzilein Apni Jaga"

Nominated

- Best Film – Prakash Mehra
- Best Director – Prakash Mehra
- Best Actor – Amitabh Bachchan
- Best Actress – Jaya Prada
- Best Lyricist – Anjaan for "Manzilein Apni Jaga"
- Best Lyricist – Anjaan and Prakash Mehra for "Inteha Ho Gayi"
- Best Male Playback Singer – Kishore Kumar for "De De Pyaar De"
- Best Male Playback Singer – Kishore Kumar for "Inteha Ho Gayi"
- Best Male Playback Singer – Kishore Kumar for "Log Kehte Hai"
