= 32nd Filmfare Awards =

1985 awards for Hindi cinema

- Date: 1985

Highlights
- Best Film: Sparsh
- Critics Award for Best Film: Damul
- Most awards: Saaransh, Sohni Mahiwal & Sparsh (3)
- Most nominations: Sharaabi (11)

The 32nd Filmfare Awards were held in 1985.

Sharaabi led the ceremony with 11 nominations, followed by Aaj Ki Awaaz and Saaransh with 7 nominations and Sohni Mahiwal and Sparsh with 5 nominations each.

Saaransh, Sohni Mahiwal and Sparsh won 3 awards each, becoming the most-awarded films at the ceremony.

This year, the trend backed away from Parallel Cinema as more commercial films won awards.

Shabana Azmi received dual nominations for Best Actress for her performances in Bhavna and Sparsh, winning for the former.

== Main awards ==
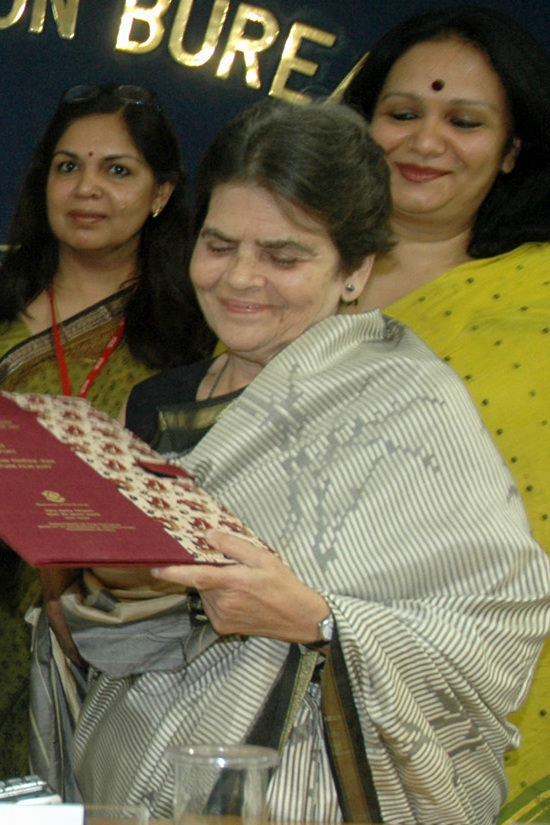
Sai Paranjpye — Best Director winner for Sparsh

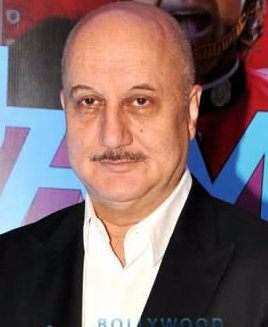
Anupam Kher — Best Actor winner for Saaransh

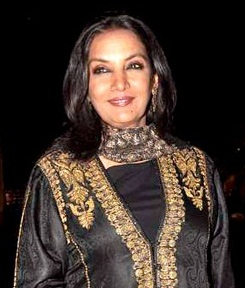
Shabana Azmi — Best Actress winner for Bhavna

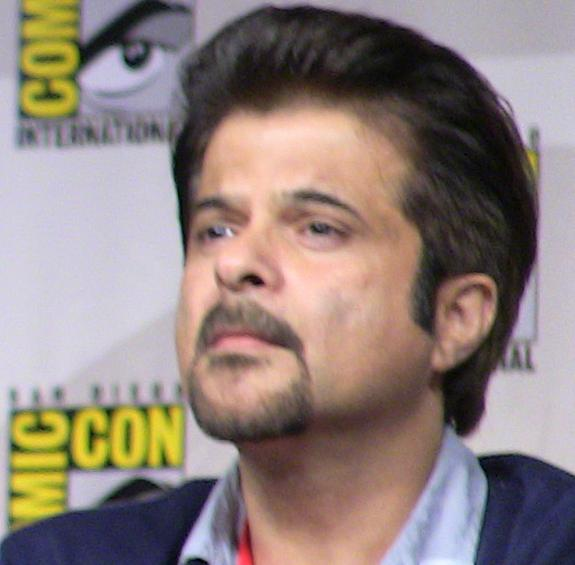
Anil Kapoor — Best Supporting Actor winner for Mashaal

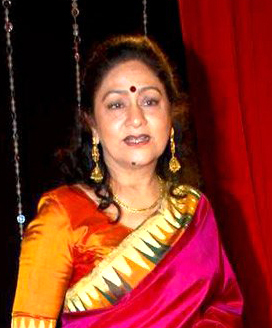
Aruna Irani — Best Supporting Actress winner for Pet Pyaar Aur Paap

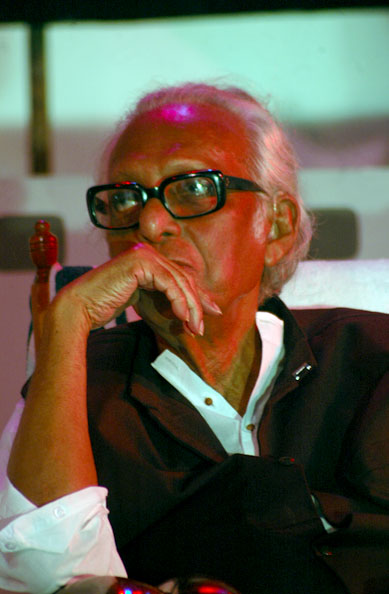
Mrinal Sen — Best Screenplay winner for Khandhar

=== Best Film ===
Sparsh

- Aaj Ki Awaaz
- Jaane Bhi Do Yaaro
- Saaransh
- Sharaabi

=== Best Director ===
Sai Paranjpye – Sparsh

- Kundan Shah – Jaane Bhi Do Yaaro
- Mahesh Bhatt – Saaransh
- Prakash Mehra – Sharaabi
- Ravi Chopra – Aaj Ki Awaaz

=== Best Actor ===
Anupam Kher – Saaransh

- Amitabh Bachchan – Sharaabi
- Dilip Kumar – Mashaal
- Naseeruddin Shah – Sparsh
- Raj Babbar – Aaj Ki Awaaz

=== Best Actress ===
Shabana Azmi – Bhavna

- Jaya Prada – Sharaabi
- Rohini Hattangadi – Saaransh
- Shabana Azmi – Sparsh
- Smita Patil – Aaj Ki Awaaz

=== Best Supporting Actor ===
Anil Kapoor – Mashaal

- Danny Denzongpa – Kanoon Kya Karega
- Nikhil Bhagat – Hip Hip Hurray
- Shafi Inamdar – Aaj Ki Awaaz
- Suresh Oberoi – Ghar Ek Mandir

=== Best Supporting Actress ===
Aruna Irani – Pet Pyaar Aur Paap

- Rehana Sultan – Hum Rahe Naa Hum
- Rohini Hattangadi – Bhavna
- Sharmila Tagore – Sunny
- Soni Razdan – Saaransh

=== Best Comic Actor ===
Ravi Baswani – Jaane Bhi Do Yaaro

- Dada Kondke – Tere Mere Beech Mein
- Ravi Baswani – Ab Ayega Mazaa
- Satish Shah – Jaane Bhi Do Yaaro
- Shakti Kapoor – Tohfa

=== Best Story ===
Saaransh – Mahesh Bhatt

- Aaj Ki Awaaz – Shabd Kumar
- Ghar Ek Mandir – Gyaan Dev Agnihotri
- Mashaal – Javed Akhtar
- Mohan Joshi Hazir Ho! – Sudhir Mishra

=== Best Screenplay ===
Khandhar – Mrinal Sen

=== Best Dialogue ===
Sparsh – Sai Paranjpye

=== Best Art Direction ===
Saaransh – Madhukar Shinde

=== Best Cinematography ===
Jaag Utha Insaan – P. L. Raj

=== Best Editing ===
Sohni Mahiwal – M.S. Shinde

=== Best Sound ===
Sohni Mahiwal – Brahmanand Sharma

=== Best Music Director ===
Sharaabi – Bappi Lahiri

- Jawaani – R.D. Burman
- Kasam Paida Karne Wale Ki – Bappi Lahiri
- Sohni Mahiwal – Anu Malik
- Tohfa – Bappi Lahiri

=== Best Lyricist ===
Aaj Ki Awaaz – Hasan Kamal for Aaj Ki Awaaz

- Sharaabi – Anjaan and Prakash Mehra for Inteha Ho Gayi
- Sharaabi – Anjaan for Manzilain Apni Jagah Hain
- Sohni Mahiwal – Anand Bakshi for Sohni Chinab Di
- Tohfa – Indeevar for Tohfa Tere Pyaar Ka

=== Best Playback Singer, Male ===
Sharaabi – Kishore Kumar for Manzilein Apni Jagah Hain

- Sharaabi – Kishore Kumar for De De Pyaar De
- Sharaabi – Kishore Kumar for Inteha Ho Gayi
- Sharaabi – Kishore Kumar for Log Kehte Hain

=== Best Playback Singer, Female ===
Sohni Mahiwal – Anupama Deshpande for Sohni Chinab Di

- Kasam Paida Karne Wale Ki – Salma Agha for Jhoom Jhoom Baba

== Critics' awards ==
=== Best Film ===
Damul

=== Best Documentary ===
Charakku

== Most Wins ==
- Sparsh – 3/5
- Sohni Mahiwal – 3/5
- Saaransh – 3/7
- Sharaabi – 2/11
- Aaj Ki Awaaz – 1/7

== See also ==
- 34th Filmfare Awards
- Filmfare Awards
