= Vanaprastham (soundtrack) =

Vanaprastham (Original Motion Picture Soundtrack)

Film score by Zakir Hussain
- Released: 1 October 1999 (Europe)
- Genre: Folk; world; country; Jazz
- Length: 41:00
- Label: Universal Music France
- Producer: Zakir Hussain

Zakir Hussain chronology
Saaz (1998)	Vanaprastham (Original Motion Picture Soundtrack) (1999)	The Mystic Masseur (2001)

Vanaprastham (Original Motion Picture Soundtrack) is the soundtrack album to the 1999 Indo-French psychological drama period film Vanaprastham directed by Shaji N. Karun, starring Mohanlal and Suhasini Maniratnam. The album featured the film score composed by Ustad Zakir Hussain, featuring 9 tracks of the score and was released through Universal Music France on 1 October 1999.

== Development ==
Ustad Zakir Hussain composed the film score for Vanaprastham. Zakir considered the core of the music to be traditional, based on the characters and subject, hence he spent around six months studying Kathakali, by listening to the music, meeting Kathakali artists, and also visiting the sets of the film to get the feel of the artform, and felt Vanaprastham being "a much more involved project than a normal film". Since the film did not feature songs, the music had to be emotive and expressive bringing all the subtle nuances on screen. Zakir was concerned on how Shaji wanted a scene to express itself and did not want to disturb it musically, hence the sessions divided into two different zones—one focusing on the core of the traditional Kathakali music, and the other being a modern approach to film music.

Zakir noted that when Mohanlal's character presented the traditional Kathakali artform, instruments such as chenda, idakka, madhalam and veena were used in the film, and wanted to express themselves to display the tradition, rather than how western music or pop music use Indian instruments for sound effects. Much of the music dealt with the Carnatic ragas so that it could closely relate to the Kathakali music providing more emotional content, and Zakir considered keeping the structure of the raga intact, maintaning the harmony and also work with the modernistic melodies. Since the film is an Indo-French co-production, and also intended to be presented all over the world, Zakir wanted to bridge the musical gap in a way that did not disturb the tradition and also appeal it to wider audience, so that they would feel an emotion, the way Indians would feel while listening to a particular raga.

Having well-versed with Carnatic music and musicians in his past, Zakir went to Kerala for the filming and saw a performance of the chenda master (Mattannoor Sankarankutty) which he found astonished about their discipline and dedication for their craft. He spent 10 days at the sets to figure out the notes of chenda music. Zakir wrote several music themes that underlined each characters and a wide canvas of emotions throughout the film. Zakir conceptualized several musical ideas for each character and take them through the whole journey the character is taking, whether it is confusion, indecision, love and anger, so that audience could identify the character and their feelings from the music.

== Release ==
The soundtrack album was distributed by Universal Music France, it was released on 1 October 1999 in Europe.

== Reception ==
Prem Panicker of Rediff.com wrote "[Zakir] Hussain is a master who, with this [lyrical background] score, gives the film its throbbing heartbeat." N. P. Krishnakumar of Gulf News called the music, camerawork and editing, are "integral elements to this cinematic masterpiece". Neelima Menon of Mathrubhumi wrote "Zakir Hussain’s haunting score, with its soft, deliberate crescendos, becomes the pulse beneath the surface." Following Hussain's death in December 2024, his work in Vanaprastham was regarded one of the notable works, by Deccan Herald and The Indian Express. OnManorama noted that "Though he did the music for only one film [Vanaprastham], his legion of followers embraced that."

== Track listing ==
Vanaprastham (Original Motion Picture Soundtrack) track listing
No.	Title	Length
1.	"Subhadra"	5:56
2.	"Smile"	3:44
3.	"Kunhikuttan"	3:59
4.	"Elanga"	2:31
5.	"Kamini"	5:29
6.	"Puskara"	3:04
7.	"Dark Melody"	4:27
8.	"Subhadra 2"	7:18
9.	"Taal Mantra"	4:32
Total length:		41:00
