= Paudwal =

Paudwal is a surname. People with the surname include:

- Anuradha Paudwal
- Kavita Paudwal
