= Sawan Ko Aane Do =

- Sawan Ko Aane Do
- Directed by: Kanak Mishra
- Produced by: Tarachand Barjatya
- Starring: Arun Govil; Amrish Puri; Zarina Wahab; Rita Bhaduri
- Music by: Raj Kamal
- Distributed by: Rajshri Productions Pvt. Ltd.
- Release date: 1979
- Country: India
- Language: Hindi

Sawan Ko Aane Do (English: Let the Monsoon arrive) is a 1979 Rajshri Productions Hindi movie produced by Tarachand Barjatya and directed by Kanak Mishra. The film was noted for its enchanting songs and charismatic performance by Arun Govil. It is said To Be " Star of Tomorrow " by Magazines

The film stars Arun Govil, Zarina Wahab, Rita Bhaduri and Amrish Puri. The film's music was composed by Raj Kamal and the lyrics by Indeevar, Gauhar Kanpuri, Maya Govind and others. Songs were performed by K J Yesudas, Sulakshana Pandit, Jaspal Singh, Kalyani Mishra and Anand Kumar C.

The film was shot mostly in the interior and outskirts of the city Lucknow.

== Plot ==
The film begins with the return of Chandramukhi (Zarina Wahab) to her native village, Ramnagar. She is the daughter of a proud landowner. Unfortunately her father (Amrish Puri) is dealing with a dispute over the land due to a former servants grand son trying to steal it. Having lost her mother at a young age, Chandramukhi had then been sent to live with her mother's parents in Lucknow, because her father had felt unable to take care of a small girl all by himself. Now, after completing her exams, she has returned to Ramnagar to take care of her beloved father, and spend a couple of years with him, while he arranges a suitable marriage for her.

Returning to Ramnagar, Chandramukhi meets her childhood school-friend Brij Mohan (Arun Govil), aka Birju, a young man with a talent for singing. Birju's parents are dead and he lives with his three older brothers, their wives and a little niece on whom he dotes. His brothers likewise dote on him and cherish him, but their wives are not fond of him and consider that his brothers have spoiled him so that he does not work in the fields but spends his time reading, singing and playing music. Birju belongs to the same Brahmin caste as Chandramukhi, but his family was never wealthy and has no memories of exalted status. The family does own some inherited farmland, but Birju's brothers themselves plough the field and raise the crop; they are farmers rather than land-owning Zamindars.

Chandramukhi invites Birju to sing at the mansion and is amazed by his voice. Birju and Chandramukhi start spending a lot of time together and she encourages him to share his voice with the world and become a famous singer. Eventually the two fall in love, but one night while Birju is singing under a tree, Chandramukhi goes to meet him and her father finds out. These meetings make him angry and he sends her back to Lucknow immediately. A short while later, Birju arrives in Lucknow, having been thrown out of his house by his sister in laws. Birju finds a place to stay with the mother of a man who tried to con him. Eventually he meets Gitanjali (Rita Bhaduri), who happens to be Chandramukhi's friend and is thrilled by his voice and helps him get a job at Aakashvani as a singer through her father. Birju returns to Ramnagar to ask for Chandramukhi's hand in marriage, but is once again rebuked. By this time, her family has lost its wealth in a court case and she becomes a teacher at the local school. This rejection motivates Birju to become a rich singer so that he can prove his worth. He returns and goes on to become a great singer in Mumbai with Gitanjali by his side, however he yearns for Chandramukhi and she yearns for him. With the village school on the verge of laying off teachers, they decide to invite Birju now Pandit Brijmohan to perform at their charity show to raise money. When Birju arrives in Ramnagar he meets his family and forgives his sister in laws, he then invites Chandramukhi's father to the show as well. Chandramukhi's father tells him he no longer has any objection to Birju marrying his daughter. Birju performs on stage with a song dedicated to Chandramukhi and the film ends with him walking away with his arm around Chandramukhi.

== Cast ==
- Arun Govil as Brij Mohan/Birju
- Zarina Wahab as Chandrmukhi
- Amrish Puri as Chandrmukhi's Dad
- Rita Bhaduri as Gitanjali
- Yunus Parvez as Balu
- Leela Mishra as Amma
- Jankidas as Karela Mama
- Pinchoo Kapoor as Kanuga
- Roopesh Kumar as Kanuga's Son
- Mukri
- Anand - Actor

== Soundtrack ==
All the songs were composed by Raj Kamal. Almost all the songs were melodious and hits, however the songs "Sawan Ko Aane Do", "Chand Jaise Mukhde Pe", "Teri Tasveer Ko", "Tujhe Dekh Kar", "Jaanam Jaanam", "Tere Bin Soona" and "Bole To Baansuri" were great hits and were usually on the tongue of the youth during those days.

No.	Title	Singer(s)	Lyricist	Duration	Raga
1	"Sawan Ko Aane Do"	Jaspal Singh, Kalyani Mitra, Chorus	Gauhar Kanpuri	04:10	
2	"Kajre Ki Baati"	Yesudas, Sulakshana Pandit	Maya Govind	03:50	
3	"Patthar Se Sheesha"	Anand Kumar C	Fauq Jaami	04:43	
4	"Gagan Yeh Samjhe"	Jaspal Singh, Chorus	Madan Bharti	03:55	
5	"Chand Jaise Mukhde Pe"	Yesudas	Purushottam Pankaj	04:09	
6	"Teri Tasveer Ko"	Yesudas	Fauq Jaami	04:59	
7	"Tujhe Dekh Kar"	Yesudas	Indeevar	03:43	
8	"Jaanam Jaanam"	Yesudas	Fauq Jaami	04:31	
9	"Tere Bin Soona"	Yesudas	Abhilash	03:08	
10	"Bole To Baansuri"	Yesudas	Pooran Kumar Hosh	04:02	Kedar
