= Disha =

Disha is an Indian feminine given name. Notable people with the name include:

- Disha Patani (born 1992/1993), Indian actress
- Disha Parmar (born 1992), Indian actress and model
- Disha Vakani (born 1978), Indian actress
- Disha Ravi (born 1998/1999), Indian climate activist
- Disha Pandey, Indian actress and model
- Disha Madan, Indian actress and social media personality

== See also ==
- Disha (film)
- DISHA (spacecraft)
