= Raj Kamal =

Indian composer

- Born: 15 January 1928; Mathaniya, Jodhpur Rajasthan, India
- Died: 1 September 2005 (aged 77); India
- Occupations: Film composer & director
- Years active: 1971 – 2005

Raj Kamal (15 January 1928 – 1 September 2005) was a well-known Indian composer. He composed classics such as the unforgettable Chashm-e-Buddoor, kahan se aaye badra, kaali ghodi dwaar khadi, Sawan Ko Aane Do, Chand Jaise Mukhde pe sung by K. J. Yesudas, Taqdeer se koi sung by Anandkumar C, and several other well-known songs. He also composed the music of B.R. Chopra's classic television show Mahabharat.

== Personal life ==
Composer Raj Kamal was born to Tulsidas and his wife in a village called Mathaniya in Rajasthan. He was named Dalpat after birth, a name he would later change to Raj Kamal for Bollywood. He was the eldest of 5 children. Raj Kamal came to Bombay with his whole family; his father having been persuaded by his brother, tabla maestro Pt. Bansilal Bharati. After marriage, Raj Kamal and his wife Sagar had 6 children - Chandra Kamal, Surya Kamal, Vinay Kamal, Hriday Kamal, Shubh Kamal, and a daughter Sunita Kamal. His three elder sons are all composers and musicians in their own right. Raj Kamal died aged 77 on 1 September 2005 from Alzheimer's disease which had severely affected his memory.

== Filmography ==
=== As director ===
- Zakhmi Haseena (2001)

== Discography ==
=== Films ===
| Year | Film | Notes |
|---|---|---|
| 1971 | Dost Aur Dushman | |
| 1972 | Achha Bura | |
| 1976 | Mera Salaam | |
| 1979 | Sawan Ko Aane Do | |
| 1980 | Jazbaat | |
| 1980 | Payal Ki Jhankaar | |
| 1981 | Chashme Buddoor | |
| 1982 | Akhand Saubhagyavati | |
| 1983 | Katha | |
| 1984 | Phulwari | |
| 1984 | Kanoon Meri Mutthi Mein | |
| 1984 | Johny Ustad | |
| 1985 | Aazhi (Malayalam) | |
| 1985 | Pratima | Unreleased |
| 1986 | Amma | |
| 1987 | 7 Saal Baad | |
| 1988 | Razia | |
| 1997 | Ganga Maange Khoon | |
| 1998 | Saaz | |

=== Television ===
| Year | Serial | Channel | Notes |
|---|---|---|---|
| 1986 | Bahadur Shah Zafar (TV series) | DD National | |
| 1988–1990 | Mahabharat | DD National | Playback singer also |
| 1997 | Mahabharat Katha | DD National | |
| 2000–2002 | Vishnu Puran | Zee TV | |
| 2001–2004 | Aap Beeti | DD National | |
| 2002–2003 | Ma Shakti (TV series) | | |

=== Bhajans ===
| Year | Bhajan/Album | Notes |
|---|---|---|
| 1987 | Jai Baba Ram Dev | |
| 1990 | Vari Jaun Balaji | |
| 1993 | Maiya Taar De Vol. 5 by Narendra Chanchal | composed with Ved Sethi |
