= Kanoon Meri Mutthi Mein =

- Directed by: K. Prasad
- Produced by: Dara Maruti
- Starring: See below
- Music by: Raj Kamal
- Release date: 1984
- Country: India
- Language: Hindi

Kanoon Meri Mutthi Mein is a 1984 Hindi-language action drama film directed by K. Prasad and produced by Dara Maruti. This multi starer movie was released in 1984 under the banner of Maruti Films. The Music of the film was composed by Raj Kamal.

== Plot ==
Dacoits kill Bikram at the day of Rakhsha Bandhan. Bikram's sister Geeta seeks revenge for her brother's death and become a lady dacoit, renamed as Jwala. Police inspector Sagar is assigned to catch her but he falls in love with Geeta, unaware that the lady is actually Jwala, the infamous dacoit.

== Cast ==
- Parveen Babi as Geeta/Jwala
- Smita Patil as Roma
- Raj Babbar as Vijay
- Arun Govil as Pankaj
- Marc Zuber as Gautam
- Suresh Oberoi as Inspector Sagar
- Shakti Kapoor as Duryodhan
- Kader Khan as Sher Singh
- Ranjeet as Shamsher
- Paintal as Anand
- Raza Murad as Advocate, Duryodhan's lawyer
- Leena Das as Dancer
- Rehana Sultan as Aftab's wife

== Soundtrack ==
- Solha Saal Ki Sajan Teri- Salma Agha
- Maa Hu Na Suhagan Hu- Salma Agha
- Mummy Daddy Ko Bhagwaan - Chandrani Mukherjee, Rajeshwari
- Aate Hi Kahte Ho, Jana Hai Jaldi Hai - Asha Bhonsle
- Ingali Mungali Khaike - Asha Bhonsle
