= Papeeha =

- Directed by: Sai Paranjpye
- Starring: Milind Gunaji, Winnie Paranjpe, Raghubir Yadav
- Music by: Bhupen Hazarika
- Release date: 1993
- Running time: 150 minutes
- Country: India
- Language: Hindi

Papeeha (Hindi: पपीहा; transl. a cuckoo) is a 1993 Indian Hindi-language film depicting a love story between a young anthropologist and a forest officer in the backdrop of a theme of tribals out to save a forestland. Directed by Sai Paranjpye, the film stars Milind Gunaji, Winnie Paranjpe and Raghubir Yadav.

== Plot ==
Jia, an anthropologist comes to the forests to study tribals where she meets Kabir Sagar, a forest officer. Fiercely protective of the forest, Kabir initially resents Jia's visit, taking her to be another pretentious expert on an excursion. Jia returns the cold vibes, but takes a liking to his assistant Bichhua, a local tribal, who takes her to where he lives in the interior. There, she discovers the designs of a timber mafia out to axe trees in the forest and a local landlord Mangeram in cahoots with a multinational company out to acquire the forest land. Jia and Kabir too become close. Kabir presents her an ornate comb, a tribal man's way of professing his love. But she wards off any ideas of romantic involvement.

Meanwhile, men in the village are coaxed into cutting trees, but women plan to defy them, aided by Jia and Bichhua. As men come with axes to cut trees they are confronted by women from their own families clutching on to a tree each. The forest is saved and Bichhua's wedding festivities are on when Jia, who has been offered a scholarship to study abroad, in the meanwhile, makes a surprise appearance wearing the comb in her hair.

== Cast ==
- Milind Gunaji as Kabir Sagar
- Winnie Paranjpe as Jia Rajhans
- Raghubir Yadav as Bichhua
