= Dost Aur Dushman =

- Directed by: Chand
- Produced by: Doulatram Lalsinghani
- Starring: Vinod Khanna; Tabassum; Rekha; Jayshree T.
- Music by: Raj Kamal
- Distributed by: Shiv Paras Production
- Release date: 1971
- Country: India
- Language: Hindi

Dost Aur Dushman (transl. Friend and Foe) is a 1971 Bollywood action film directed by Chand. The film stars Vinod Khanna, Rekha and Jayshree T.

== Cast ==
- Vinod Khanna
- Rekha
- Heena Kauser
- Jayshree T.
- Murad
- Sapru
- Tabassum
- Joginder
- Shiv Kumar

== Soundtrack ==
1. "Sanma O Mere Pyar Ka Banayka Kaahe Rayta" – Hemlata, Mohammed Rafi
2. "Auu Auu Aa Aa Jab Jab Dekhu" – Mohammed Rafi
3. "Dil Ki Hasrat Kab Nikal Jayegi" – Asha Bhosle
4. "Nadan Na Ban Pachtayega Mujhe Mat Chhuna Jal Jaaya" – Asha Bhosle
