= The Man with the Axe =

The Man with the Axe may refer to:

- "The Man with the Axe", a 2021 song by Lorde from Solar Power
- The King of Diamonds in a standard 52-card deck of playing cards
- Parashuram (1979 film)
