= Sparsh (film) =

1980 film by Sai Paranjpye

- Directed by: Sai Paranjpye
- Written by: Sai Paranjpye
- Produced by: Basu Bhattacharya
- Starring: Naseeruddin Shah; Shabana Azmi; Sudha Chopra; Om Puri
- Cinematography: Virendra Saini
- Edited by: Om Prakash Makkar
- Music by: Kanu Roy
- Release date: 30 January 1980
- Running time: 145 minutes
- Language: Hindi

Sparsh (transl. Touch) is a 1980 Indian Hindi drama film directed by Sai Paranjpye. It stars Naseeruddin Shah and Shabana Azmi playing the characters of a visually impaired principal and a sighted teacher in a school for the blind, where they fall in love though soon their complexes tag along and they struggle to get past them to reconnect with the "touch" of love. The film remains most memorable for the subtle acting of its leads, plus the handling of the issue of relationships with the visually disabled, revealing the emotional and perception divide between the worlds of the "blind" and the "sighted", epitomized by the characters. The film's release was delayed by almost 4 years. It won the National Film Award for Best Feature Film in Hindi.

The film won numerous awards including National Film Award – Best Actor for Shah, while Paranjpye won for Best Screenplay. At the Filmfare Awards, it won the top two honours: that of Best Movie and Best Director, plus a Best Screenplay Award for Paranjpye. Further, Azmi was nominated for Best Actress, which she eventually won for the film Bhavna. Sai Paranjpye also won an Filmfare award for Best Dialogue for the film.

== Synopsis ==
This film is about the blind, in particular about the lives and feelings of blind children and the principal of their school. Sparsh refers to the sensation and feeling of touch upon which blind people rely in the absence of sight.

The story opens with Anirudh Parmar as the principal of Navjivan Andhvidyalay, a school for the blind that educates about 200 blind children. Anirudh has a dark and lonely existence for the most part. One day, while on his way to the doctor, he hears a lovely song and ends up mesmerized at the singer's door instead of going to the doctor.

The voice belongs to Kavita Prasad, a young woman recently widowed after three years of marriage. Kavita, too, prefers a secluded existence. Her childhood friend Manju is the only ally she has.

Manju throws a small party where Kavita and Anirudh meet. He recognizes her from her voice. During the conversation, he mentions that the school is looking for volunteers to read, sing, teach handicrafts and spend time with the children. Kavita is reluctant, but she is urged by Manju and her husband Suresh to strongly consider it. Kavita decides to volunteer.

As Kavita spends more time at the school, she begins forming a friendship with Anirudh. The friendship grows stronger over time and they become engaged. But their personalities and feelings are different. Anirudh is of strong character. He firmly believes that the blind need help but not pity or charity. (When once, in his office, Kavita attempts to assist him with coffee, he gets enraged at the thought of his guest offering to overcome his obvious difficulty with hospitality.) Kavita, recently bereaved, looks to the school (and Anirudh) as a way towards an ideal, one of sacrificial service. Anirudh gets wind of this and assumes Kavita is simply seeking to fill the void in her life with this form of service. He assumes she accepted his wedding proposal, not out of love, but as a sacrifice towards a way out of her dark life. During this time, Anirudh's blind friend Dubey laments that his recently deceased wife was not happy in their marriage.

Anirudh is shaken, confused, and disturbed by all this. He breaks off his engagement (but does not mention the reason to Kavita). She accepts his decision.

Kavita, now a salaried employee of the school, continues to help the children. The initial coldness between her and Anirudh gives way to friction and eventually, over a series of events at the school, brings up the feelings they were not able to discuss before. The situation spirals downward and one of them must leave the school.

The film ends with Anirudh and Kavita being touched by the depth of their feelings for one another and finally seeing a way out.

== Cast ==
- Shabana Azmi – Kavita
- Naseeruddin Shah – Anirudh Parmar
- Sudha Chopra – Manju
- Mohan Gokhale – Jagdish
- Pran Talwar
- Arun Joglekar
- Om Puri – Dubey

== Production ==
=== Filming ===
Much of the film was shot at the Blind Relief Association in New Delhi and the character of Anirudh is modelled on Mr Mittal, who was the headmaster of the association.

== Awards ==
Award	Category	Recipient(s)	Result	Ref(s)
27th National Film Awards	Best Feature Film in Hindi	Basu Bhattacharya and Sai Paranjpye	Won	
27th National Film Awards	Best Actor	Naseeruddin Shah	Won	
27th National Film Awards	Best Screenplay	Sai Paranjpye	Won	
32nd Filmfare Awards:	Best Film	Basu Bhattacharya	Won	
32nd Filmfare Awards:	Best Director	Sai Paranjpye	Won	
32nd Filmfare Awards:	Best Dialogue	Sai Paranjpye	Won	
32nd Filmfare Awards:	Best Actor	Naseeruddin Shah	Nominated	
32nd Filmfare Awards:	Best Actress	Shabana Azmi	Nominated	

== Music ==
All lyrics are written by Indu Jain; all music is composed by Kanu Roy.

No.	Title	Artist(s)	Length
1.	"Concert (Sarod)"	Amjad Ali Khan
2.	"Geeton Ki Duniya Mein Sargam"	Sulakshana Pandit
3.	"Khali Pyala Dhundhla Darpan"	Sulakshana Pandit
4.	"Pyala Chhalka Ujla Darpan"	Sulakshana Pandit
