= Suee =

- Directed by: Sai Paranjpye
- Written by: Sai Paranjpye (Screenplay & Dialogue)
- Produced by: South Asia Region Development Marketplace, Sai Paranjpye Films
- Release date: July 2009
- Running time: 30 minutes
- Country: India
- Language: Hindi English Subtitles

Suee (The Needle), a film directed by Sai Paranjpye, explores a number of areas in the lives of injecting drug users including treatment, care, peer and community support, rehabilitation and the workplace. It was launched by Response Beyond Borders, the Asian consortium on drug use HIV/ AIDS and poverty at the IX International Congress on AIDS in Asia and the Pacific.

Ms Paranjpye, a Cannes Film Festival award winner, worked closely with injecting drug users from the Sankalp Rehabilitation Trust in Mumbai and spent time interviewing them on location and involving them as actors in the film. She also consulted NGO Sharan in Delhi, the International Center for Research on Women, and the World Bank.

The 30 minute film was aired on Doordarshan on World AIDS Day, 1 December 2009.

== Production ==
The film was drawn from the South Asia Region Development Marketplace (SAR DM), an initiative spearheaded by the World Bank. It consists of a competitive grants programme that identifies and supports small scale projects demonstrating an innovative approach to reducing HIV stigma and discrimination in the region. 26 civil society organizations from across South Asia won grants of US$40,000 each to bring their ideas to fruition.
