= Bimal Dutt =

Indian filmmaker, film director and editor

- Born: 1924; Orisha, Bengal Presidency, British India
- Died: 4 March 1996 (aged 71–72); Bandra, Bombay. India
- Occupation: filmmaker

Bimal Dutt (1924 – 4 March 1996) was an Indian filmmaker, film director, writer and editor, who directed all-time classics like Kasturi (1980), and Protimurti. He also wrote stories and screenplays.

== Death ==
Dutt died on March 4, 1996, at his Mumbai residence.
