= Shrikant Narayan =

Indian stage and playback singer (born 1968)

Shrikkant Narayan
- Born: 17 January 1968 (age 57); Mumbai, India
- Origin: India
- Genres: Stage Singing, Light Singing, ghazal, playback singing
- Occupation: Singer
- Instrument: Vocalist

Shrikant Narayan (born 17 January 1968) is an Indian stage and playback singer, known for the Marathi song Dol Doltay Warya Vari which reached double platinum status in India in 1986. Narayan records music in a number of languages; Hindi, Marathi, Tamil, Telugu, Kannada and Malayalam.

== Career ==
Narayan took part in music competitions during his youth, but did not pursue a singing career until winning a singing competition whilst attending Bhavan's College, Andheri in 1985–1986. He graduated from university in 1990 and would perform in the evenings, whilst working full-time during the day, latterly with pharmaceutical company May & Baker. Narayan would leave May & Baker in 1997 to perform full-time.

He has performed with Kavita Krishnamurthy, Shankar Mahadevan, Vinod Rathod and Sudesh Bhosle.

Narayan performed a 12-hour marathon concert titled Pukarta Chala Hoon Main in Mumbai on 25 December 2012, which featured 101 songs by Mohammed Rafi, to celebrate what would have been Rafi's 88th birthday.

== Achievements and awards ==
Narayan has been awarded the Maharashtra Kalabhushan Award by the Maharashtra Government and the Jan Parishad Award by the Madhya Pradesh Government.
