= Ravi Baswani =

Indian actor (1946–2010)

- Born: 29 September 1946; Delhi, British India
- Died: 27 July 2010 (aged 63); Haldwani, Uttarakhand, India
- Occupation: Actor
- Years active: 1981–2006

Ravi Baswani (29 September 1946 – 27 July 2010) was an Indian film actor, best known for his role in Sai Paranjpe's Chashme Buddoor (1981) and Kundan Shah's cult comedy Jaane Bhi Do Yaaro (1983), for which he won Filmfare Best Comedian Award in 1984. He was noted for his comic timing and underplaying a character in the true sense of the word. In a career spanning 30 years he acted in some 30 films. He died in Haldwani, on his way to Delhi from Nainital, to where he had travelled to scout for locations for his upcoming debut directorial feature film.

== Early life and education ==
Ravi Baswani was born and brought up in a Jat family in Delhi. He did his schooling from St. George's College, Mussoorie and his graduation from Kirori Mal College (KMC), Delhi University, where he was part of the KMC dramatic society.

== Career ==
Baswani started his career in 1981 with Chashme Buddoor and did many successful films as a comedian and/or as a character artist. He also appeared many times on Indian television. He went on to work in films like the cult Jaane Bhi Do Yaaro, Kabhi Haan Kabhi Naa, Chhota Chetan, Ab Aayega Maza and Naseeruddin Shah's first directorial venture, Yun Hota Toh Kya Hota. As a television actor, he acted in numerous TV serials, including, the popular comedy serial, Idhar Udhar on Doordarshan in the 1980s, wherein he acted alongside Pathak sisters, Supriya Pathak and Ratna Pathak. He was then seen in character roles in films like Bunty Aur Babli and Pyar Tune Kya Kiya. In 2004, when Film and Television Institute of India, Pune revived its acting course after 26 years, he became its coordinator and a teacher, along with Naseeruddin Shah, who also redesigned the course. Baswani however resigned the following year.

== Death ==
Baswani died following a massive heart attack on 27 July 2010 in Haldwani (Distt. Nainital). He was returning from Nainital to Delhi, where he had to hunt for locations for his directorial debut film, set in the hills. He never married.

== Filmography ==
Year	Film	Role	Notes
2006	Monsoon	Baba	
2006	Anthony Kaun Hai?	Dr. Lashwani	
2006	Yun Hota Toh Kya Hota	Papaji	
2005	The Film	Film-maker Kanti Gulati	
2005	Bunty Aur Babli	B.B.'s first victim	
2005	Lucky: No Time for Love	Mr. Negi	
2005	It Could Be You	Dhillon Sr	
2001	Pyaar Tune Kya Kiya	Vispy – Jai's boss	
2000	Chal Mere Bhai	Waitor	
1999	Double Gadbad	Sub-Inspector Kali Pandey	
1998	Jab Pyaar Kisise Hota Hai	Orphanage manager	
1998	Chhota Chetan	Raja	
1998	Ghar Bazar	Movie actor	Uncredited
1996	Return of Jewel Thief	Trikal Trivedi	
1994	Laadla	Ravi	
1993	Kabhi Haan Kabhi Naa	Albert Gonsalves	
1993	Raunak	Ravi	
1992	Jaan Tere Naam	Hotel Employee	
1990	Triyatri	Surya's father	
1990	Hamari Shaadi		
1987	Zevar	Sundeep	
1986	Peechha Karo	Hari Harihara	
1986	Ghar Sansar	Banwari	
1986	Love 86	Havaldar Pandu	
1986	Main Balwan	Dhillon Sr	
1985	Agnidaah		
1985	Sultan Ka Kukdoo Ku	Ricksaw Puller	
1984	Ab Ayega Mazaa	Suresh 'Sidey'	
1983	Jaane Bhi Do Yaaro	Sudhir Mishra	
1983	Dhat Tere... Ki	Madhukar Sharma (Maddy)	
1981	Chashme Buddoor	Jai Lakhanpal alias Jomo	

== Television ==
- Idhar Udhar (1985) as Kumar Bhairav
- Ek Se Badkar Ek (1996) as Rahul
- Football Ki Wapsi
- Just Mohabbat (1997) as J.D.
