= Kasturi (1980 film) =

1980 film

- Poster
- Directed by: Bimal Dutt
- Starring: Nutan; Mithun Chakraborty; Parikshit Sahni; Sadhu Meher; Shreeram Lagoo
- Cinematography: K. K. Mahajan
- Music by: Bappi Lahiri
- Release date: 1980
- Running time: 125 minutes
- Country: India
- Language: Hindi

Kasturi is a 1980 Indian Hindi-language film directed by Bimal Dutt, starring Nutan, Mithun Chakraborty, Parikshit Sahni, Sadhu Meher and Shreeram Lagoo. The music is composed by Uttam Singh.

It was released on 14 November 1980.
