= Sai Paranjpye =

Indian film director (born 1938)

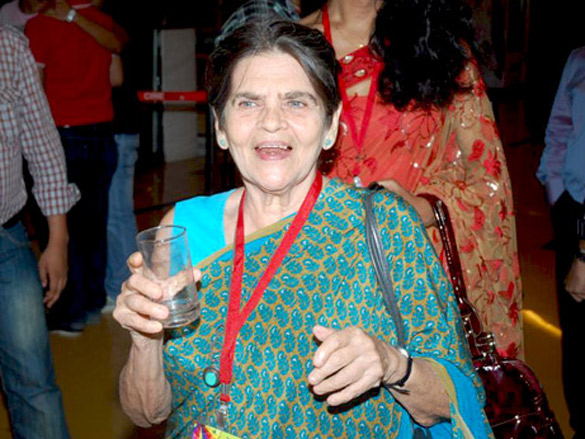
- Paranjpye in 2011
- Born: 19 March 1938 (age 88); Lucknow, United Provinces, British India
- Occupations: director, screenwriter
- Spouse: Arun Joglekar (divorced)
- Children: 2
- Mother: Shakuntala Paranjpye
- Relatives: R. P. Paranjpye (grandfather)
- Awards: Padma Bhushan (2006)

Sai Paranjpye (born 19 March 1938) is an Indian film director and screenwriter. She is the director of the award-winning movies Sparsh, Katha, Chasme Buddoor and Disha. She has written and directed many Marathi plays such as Jaswandi, Sakkhe Shejari, and Albel.

She has won four National Film Awards and two Filmfare awards. The Government of India awarded Paranjpye the Padma Bhushan in 2006 in recognition of her artistic talents.

== Early years ==
Sai Paranjpye was born on 19 March 1938 in Lucknow to Russian Youra Sleptzoff and Shakuntala Paranjpye. Sleptzoff was a Russian watercolor artist and a son of a Russian general. Shakuntala was an actor in Marathi and Hindi films in the 1930s and 1940s, including V. Shantaram's Hindi social classic, Duniya Na Mane (1937). Later she became a writer and a social worker, was nominated to Rajya Sabha, Upper House of Indian Parliament and was awarded the Padma Bhushan in 1991.

Sai's parents divorced shortly after her birth. Her mother raised Sai in the household of her own father, Sir R. P. Paranjpye, who was a renowned mathematician and educationist and who served from 1944 to 1947 as India's High Commissioner in Australia. Sai thus grew up and received education in many cities in India, including Pune, and for a few years in Canberra, Australia. As a child, she used to walk up to the home of her uncle Achyut Ranade, a noted filmmaker of the '40s and '50s, on Fergusson Hill in Pune, who would tell stories as if he were narrating a screenplay. Sai took to writing early in her life: Her first book of fairy tales – Mulānchā Mewā (in Marathi), was published when she was eight.

Paranjpye graduated from the National School of Drama (NSD), New Delhi in 1963.

== Career ==
Paranjpye started her career in All India Radio (AIR) in Pune, Maharashtra, India as an announcer and soon got involved with AIR's Children's Program.

Over the years, Paranjpye has written and directed plays in Marathi, Hindi, and English for adults and children. She has written and directed six feature films, two children's films, one of them being Nirupama Aani Parirani, and five documentaries. She has written many books for children, and six of them have won national or state level awards.

Paranjpye worked for many years as a director or a producer with Doordarshan Television in Delhi. Her first made-for-TV movie – The Little Tea Shop (1972), won the Asian Broadcasting Union Award at Teheran, Iran. Later that year, she was selected to produce the inaugural program of Bombay (Mumbai) Doordarshan.

In the 1970s, Paranjpye twice served as the Chairperson of Children's Film Society of India (CFSI), which is a government of India organization with the objective of promoting and ensuring value-based entertainment for children. She made four children's films for CFSI, including the award-winning Jādoo Kā Shankh (1974) and Sikandar (1976).

Paranjpye's first feature film Sparsh (The Touch), was released in 1980. It won five film awards, including the National Film Award. Sparsh was followed by the comedies Chashme Buddoor (1981) and Kathā (1982). Kathā was a musical satire based on the folk tale of the hare and the tortoise. She next made the TV serials Ados Pados (1984) and Chhote Bade (1985). Paranjpye worked as director, writer and narrator for the Marathi drama Maza khel mandu de. It was played on 27 September 1986 at Gadkari Rangayatan, Thane.

Paranjpye's subsequent movies include Angoothā Chhāp (1988) about the National Literacy Mission; Disha (1990) about the plight of immigrant workers; Papeeha (Forest Love Bird) (1993); Saaz (1997) (possibly inspired by the lives of Indian playback singing sisters, Lata Mangeshkar and Asha Bhosle); and Chakā Chak (2005), which was aimed at creating public awareness about environmental issues.

She also made the serials Hum Panchi Ek Chawl Ke, Partyana and Behnaa. Sridhar Rangayan assisted her in the film Papeeha and in the serials Hum Panchi Ek Chawl Ke and Partyana.

Paranjpye has also written and staged plays like Maza Khel Mandu De, Jaswandi and Sakhe Shejari.

Paranjpye directed several documentary movies, including Helping Hand (London), Talking Books, Capt. Laxmi, Warna Orchestra, and Pankaj Mullick. Her 1993 documentary Choodiyan, on the anti-liquor agitation in a small Maharashtra village for the Films Division, received the National Film Award for Best Film on Social Issues.

In 2001, Paranjpye made the movie for children, Bhago Bhoot. At the first Indian International Women's Film Festival, held in Goa in 2005, a review of her movies was held, and it featured her best movies. She headed the jury in the feature film category of the 55th National Film Awards for 2007.

In July 2009, Paranjpye's documentary film Suee was released, emerging from the South Asia Region Development Marketplace (SAR DM), an initiative spearheaded by the World Bank. Suee explores a number of areas in the lives of injecting drug users including treatment, care, peer and community support, rehabilitation and the workplace, and was produced in partnership with the Mumbai-based NGO Sankalp Rehabilitation Trust. The 29 minute film was aired on Doordarshan on World AIDS Day, 1 December 2009.

In 2016, she released her autobiography, Saya: Majha Kalapravas, written in Marathi. It was a bestseller that had reached its fifth edition in 2020. She then released A Patchwork Quilt – A Collage of My Creative Life, the English version of her autobiography, in 2020, with some chapters rewritten.

== Personal life ==
Sai was married to theater artist Arun Joglekar; they had a son, Gautam, and a daughter, Winnie. Sai and Arun separated after two years. They remained friends until Arun's death in 1992. After their separation, Arun acted in Sai's Sparsh (1980) and Katha (1983). Their son, Gautam Joglekar is a director of Marathi films (Pak Pak Pakaak, Jai Jai Maharashtra Maaza) and a professional cameraman, and their daughter Winnie Paranjpe Joglekar is an educationist and homemaker. Winnie acted in many of Sai's movies, dramas and TV serials in the 1980s. Winnie and her husband, Abhay, now deceased, have two children; Abeer and Anshunee. Gautam starred as the male lead in Nana Patekar's directorial venture Prahaar with Madhuri Dixit playing the female lead.

== Accolades ==
Civilian Award

- 2006 – Padma Bhushan – India's third highest civilian honour from the Government of India

Film Awards

Year	Award	Film	Category	Result	Ref.
1980	National Film Awards	Sparsh	Best Screenplay	Won	
1980	National Film Awards	Sparsh	Best Feature Film in Hindi	Won	
1983	National Film Awards	Katha	Best Feature Film in Hindi	Won	
1992	National Film Awards	Choodiyan	Best Film on Social Issues	Won	
1982	Filmfare Awards	Chashme Buddoor	Best Director	Nominated	
1985	Filmfare Awards	Sparsh	Best Director	Won	
1985	Filmfare Awards	Sparsh	Best Dialogue	Won	
1992	Filmfare Awards	Disha	Best Story	Nominated	

Other Awards

- 2017: Maharashtra Foundation Literature and Social Work Award
- 2019: Fergusson Gaurav Puraskar: Outstanding Alumnus Award from her Alma Mater, Fergusson College
- 2025: Padmapani Lifetime Achievement Award.

== Bibliography ==
- Nana Phadnavis, India Book House Education Trust; Echo ed edition, 1971.
- Rigmarole And Other Plays, Penguin Books India (Puffin). 2008. ISBN 0-14-333066-7.

== Filmography ==
- Jadu Ka Shankh (1974)
- Sparsh (1980)
- Chasme Buddoor (1981)
- Katha (1983)
- Ados Pados (TV 1984)
- Chote Bade (TV 1985)
- Angootha Chhaap (1988)
- Disha (1990)
- Papeeha 1993)
- Chooriyan (1993)
- Saaz (1997)
- Bhago Bhoot (2000)
- Suee (2009)
