= Saaz (film) =

- Directed by: Sai Paranjpye
- Produced by: Amit Khanna
- Starring: Shabana Azmi; Aruna Irani; Zakir Hussain
- Cinematography: G.S. Bhaskar
- Music by: Yashwant Deo; Bhupen Hazarika; Zakir Hussain; Raj Kamal
- Distributed by: Plus Films
- Release date: 1998
- Running time: 148 minutes
- Country: India
- Language: Hindi

Saaz is a 1998 Hindi musical drama film produced and directed by Sai Paranjpye, starring Aruna Irani and Shabana Azmi in lead roles. The plot is allegedly based on the life of legendary singing sisters of Bollywood, Lata Mangeshkar and Asha Bhosle.

In an interview after the release of the film Asha said, "Its not true at all. To have two women in long plaits, take a couple of incidents and exaggerate them into a 3-hour film is such a waste of time." However, Paranjpye stated in an Interview that the idea of the film came from actress Shabana Azmi who asked her to make a film on a playback singer. She also said that the story of two sisters in the film brought to life is based on the emotions experienced by herself as a writer.

== Plot ==
Saaz is a drama that revolves around the lives of two sisters, Mansi and Bansi—daughters of the great singer and theater artist Vrindavan. Born with extraordinary musical talents, the sisters face challenges and complexities rooted in familial ties, ambition, and personal struggle. The story begins with the tragic death of Vrindavan because of alcoholism that had left Mansi and Bansi orphaned. The elder sister, Mansi, moves to Mumbai with Bansi and becomes a very popular professional singer. Mansi's path to fame is contrasted with Bansi, who can only house sit for a while. Soon enough, however, Bansi finds out that she also has an excellent singing voice and wants to join her sister in the world of music. Jealous at this prospect, Mansi tries to destroy Bansi's aspirations by setting her up to marry a violent man.

Bansi's marriage turns out to be a curse, as her husband then starts physically and mentally abusing her. Even after Bansi became pregnant, Mansi tried to patch things up, but the marriage remained toxic. Mansi was worried for her niece Kuhu's safety, and thus she made Bansi divorce him. Mansi falls in love with a married music director called Indruneil. Things further complicate when Indruneil recognises Bansi's talent and offers her an opportunity to sing with Mansi, and out of jealousy, Mansi makes Bansi a background singer during the main recording.

So, fixated on succeeding independently, Bansi approaches Indruneil, who introduces her to a platform where she can project her voice. Bansi charms the audience with her voice, and soon enough, she overtook Mansi in popularity. The fierce rivalry further increases between the two sisters to the extent that Mansi does not give a second thought to snatching opportunities from Bansi, including a national, sadly prestigious performance. With time, Indruneil's career goes downhill. He stays with Bansi in a live-in relationship. However, Bansi is shattered when Indruneil decides to quit the music world.

The lead distance between the sisters draws on for ten long years. Years later, they meet in a felicitation function organised in the same theatre their father performed in. In her performance, Mansi's voice yields as she is suffering from blood cancer at a terminal stage. Before Mansi's death, she repents herself and feels guilty for her action against her sister Bansi.

Now, the plot is centered on Kuhu, who faces problems on her way to "get in the groove" as a singer. A new music director, Himaan Desai, enters their lives. While Kuhu idolises and loves Himaan, he feels his emotions for Bansi. This saddens Kuhu and makes her feel betrayed. Bansi, too, feels drawn towards Himaan, yet she breaks it off for the sake of Kuhu. Unfortunately, Himaan dies in a car accident, which Bansi happens to witness.

The events of the film come as flashbacks as Bansi tells her experiences with her psychiatrist, Dr. Ranjeet. Traumatised after Himaan's death, Bansi lost her voice and promised herself she would never sing again. With the help of a psychiatrist, Bansi slowly regained her confidence. During one of her foreign trips with Kuhu, there is an announcement declaring Kuhu a winner of a major award, which rekindled Bansi's interest in singing again. At the function organised to felicitate Kuhu's outstanding success, Bansi sang the song originally sung by her father and announced her return to singing.

The film ends with Bansi sending a recording of her performance to her psychiatrist and informing him that she has regained her confidence. Delighted, the psychiatrist meets Bansi at the airport, congratulates her, and proposes building a friendship beyond the doctor-patient relationship. Bansi smiles and agrees, and they leave together.

== Cast ==
- Shabana Azmi as Bansi (loosely based upon Asha Bhosle)
- Aruna Irani as Mansi (loosely based upon Lata Mangeshkar)
- Raghuvir Yadav as Vrindavan (loosely based upon Deenanath Mangeshkar)
- Aditi Deshpande as Vrindavan's wife (loosely based upon Shevanti Mangeshkar)
- Parikshit Sahni as Dr. Ranjeet Saamarth
- Ayesha Dharker as Kuhu Vrindavan
- Zakir Hussain as Himaan Desai
- Hemu aka Hemchandra Adhikari as Joshi
- Amar Talvar as Indranil (loosely based upon Bhosle's second husband R. D. Burman)
- Madhavi Shyete as Shevu aka Shevanta
- Brijbhushan Sahni as Bansi's husband & Kuhu's father (loosely based upon Bhosle's first husband Ganpatrao Bhosle)
- Vadehi Varerkar as Young Mansi
- Yogita Deshpande as Young Bansi
- Shruti Bhide as Young Kuhu
- Arun Hornekar as Journalist

== Music Tracks ==
The film has ten songs. The music score is provided by Zakir Hussain, Bhupen Hazarika, Raj Kamal and Yashwant Dev. Javed Akhtar won National Film Award for Best Lyrics.

- "Aaj Hum Roshan Karenge" - Sung By Devaki Pandit
- "Baadal Chaandi Barsaaye" - Sung by Devaki Pandit, Jyotsna Hardikar (Bhupen Hazarika)
- "Baadal Ghumad Badh Aaye" - Sung by Kavita Krishnamurthy & Suresh Wadkar
- "Jai Veera" - Sung by Suresh Wadkar
- "Kya Tumne Hai Keh Diya" - Sung by Kavita Krishnamurthy (Zakir Hussain)
- "Nindiya Hai Sapna Hai" - Sung by Kavita Krishnamurthy
- "Phir Bhor Bhayee" - Sung By Devaki Pandit (Zakir Hussain)
- "Raat Dhalne Lagi" - Sung by Kavita Krishnamurthy
- "Rama Bhaj Rama Bhaj" - Sung By Devaki Pandit
- "Sunne Wale Sun" - Sung by Suresh Wadkar, Shraddha Pandit, Shweta Pandit

The song "Baadal Ghumad Badh Aaye" is set in raga Miyan ki Malhar.
