= Bhavna (film) =

- Directed by: Pravin Bhatt
- Written by: Mushtaq Jalili
- Story by: Pravin Bhatt
- Produced by: Devi Dutt
- Starring: Shabana Azmi; Marc Zuber; Saeed Jaffrey
- Cinematography: Pravin Bhatt
- Edited by: B. Prasad
- Music by: Bappi Lahiri
- Release date: 10 October 1984
- Country: India
- Language: Hindi

Bhavna is a 1984 Hindi film directed by cinematographer Pravin Bhatt in directorial debut. The film stars Shabana Azmi, Marc Zuber, Kanwaljit Singh, Saeed Jaffrey, Rohini Hattangadi, Satish Shah and Urmila Matondkar (as child artiste). The film's music is by Bappi Lahiri.

== Plot ==
Bhavna Saxena, a young lady, who grew up as an orphan, lives alone in a city. She meets a man named Ajay Kapoor in a garden, sketching her portrait. They became friends and later on the friendship turns into love. Eventually they get married, though Kapoor's dad has not given his blessings to the wedding.

Ajay as an artist who does not make enough money. Bhavna tries to sell his paintings going from door to door, but their financial condition remains poor. In the midst of this worsening financial situation, Bhavna becomes pregnant with Ajay's child. Ajay is unhappy to hear this as he feels that he cannot afford the expenditure of raising a child. Unable to endure the worsening financial situation, Ajay decides to go and meet his millionaire father who resides in another city, telling Bhavna that he will return in a few days. The days turn into weeks and weeks into months. Still, there is no news of Ajay.

Bhavna manages to procure Ajay's father's address and goes in search of Ajay. Bhavna is astonished to see that Ajay has married another woman as per his father's wishes. Dejected, Bhavna confides her sorrows in Shobha, her best friend. But this is not the end of her struggles in life.

== Cast ==
- Shabana Azmi as Bhavna Saxena
- Marc Zuber as Ajay Kapoor
- Kanwaljit Singh as Dr. Anil B. Saxena
- Urmila Matondkar as Ram Kishen's Daughter (child artiste)
- Rohini Hattangadi as Shobha
- Saeed Jaffrey as Ram Kishen
- Ashalata Wabgaonkar as Mrs. Ram Kishen
- Vikas Anand as Nawab
- Satish Shah as Mr. Sinha
- Rajesh Puri as Raju (Ajay's Friend)

== Soundtrack ==
Lyricist: Kaifi Azmi

1. "Tu Kahan Aa Gayi Zindagi" - Lata Mangeshkar
2. "Tu Kahan Aa Gayi Zindagi" (v2) - Bappi Lahiri
3. "Paheli Chhoti Si" - Kavita Paudwal, Vanita Mishra, Gurpreet Kaur, Asha Bhosle
4. "Dekho Din Ye Na Dhalne Paye, Har Pal Ik Sadi Ho Jaaye" - Asha Bhosle, Kavita Paudwal
5. "Mere Dil Mai Too Hee Too Hai" - Chitra Singh, Jagjit Singh

== Awards ==
32nd Filmfare Awards:

- Won: Best Actress – Shabana Azmi
- Nominated: Best Supporting Actress – Rohini Hattangadi
