= Disha (film) =

1990 film by Sai Paranjpye

- Directed by: Sai Paranjpye
- Written by: Sai Paranjpye](Screenplay & Dialogue)
- Produced by: NFDC; Sai Paranjpye Films
- Starring: Shabana Azmi; Nana Patekar; Om Puri; Raghuvir Yadav
- Cinematography: Madhu Ambat; G.S. Bhaskar
- Edited by: Om Prakash Makkad
- Music by: Anand Modak
- Release date: 1990
- Running time: 135 minutes
- Country: India
- Language: Hindi

Disha (English: Direction) is a 1990 Indian Hindi film directed by Sai Paranjpye, based on the plight of immigrant workers in urban India, starring Shabana Azmi, Nana Patekar and Om Puri in lead roles.

The film was a part of the Indian Panorama at the International Film Festival of India. It was awarded the Best Jury and Most Popular film award at Rencontres Cinematographiques.

== Plot ==
The Story is about a little village of Bakuri, where water scarcity leads to a man named Parshuram Sarpat, to continuously dig for water resulting in the recognition as 'The pagal parsha'. Vasanta, another young man who gets married on insistence of his father to Phulwanti. Soma, who sees the Mumbai as the solution for his unemployment.

The story narrates how Vasanta's father takes loan for his marriage against his wish. yet, he had a great start in married life. Soma looking for work from local landlord, unable to get, goes to Mumbai to work in a cotton mill, living among 40 others, working and surviving all in the same debt, work, merely 8 hour sleep shift, away from family since so many years yet hoping to give them support from their hard work.

Vasanta too, could not find sustaining work after marriage leaves for Mumbai. Hansa along with Phoolwanti starts working in a Bidi factory, 5 km away from village. Munshi, manager of Bidi factory had bad intentions for Phoolwanti. Vasanta, in Mumbai, starts working and seeing the conditions thinks of leaving in 2–3 years after having a saving to open a co-operative scheme in village. He calls his wife for few days in Mumbai after arranging a shelter for them to live separately. One night, relatives of the Kholi (smallest flat in old times in old buildings) owner barge in and oust them. Vasanta along with his wife Phoolwanti, with the help of Soma and other men, living in the man's only place spends the night. The next day, Phoolwanti comes back to village. Vasanta starts doing multiple works to earn more. Soma says not to go back to village and Vasanta decides opposite to do as he feels real life is in village.

Phoolwanti again starts going to Bidi factory. She takes care of his father-in-law, having extra-marital affair with Munshi. Vasanta's father posts him to come back to village.

Meanwhile, Parsha gets success in having water from well and gets praise and announces that it will be used for everyone. Vasanta leaves village forever after understanding what his father could not write in letter. Soma decides to leave Mumbai as his brother writes about starting scheme for farming in village.

The movie shows the conditions of migrants, unemployment in rural area, old Mumbai -how it was in those days along with harsh realities of life that somewhere might be prevalent in some other ways for many.

== Cast ==
- Shabana Azmi as Hansa P. Sarpat, wife of Parshuram
- Nana Patekar as Vasanta D. Mandre
- Rizwan Shaikh
- Om Puri as Parshuram Sarpat
- Raghuvir Yadav as soma Sarpat, younger brother of Parshuram
- Nilu Phule as dashrath Mandre, father of Vasanta
- Sayaji Shinde
- Rajshree Sawant as Phoolwanti, wife of Vasanta
- Achyut Potdar, Munshi of Bidi Making factory
- Prashant Subhedar,
- Jayamala Inamdar
- Datta Rane
- Jairaj Nayar
- Vijay Parulkar
- Riju Bajaj
- Anil Bhagwat
