= Tohfa =

1984 Indian film by K. Raghavendra Rao

- Theatrical release poster
- Directed by: K. Raghavendra Rao
- Written by: Kader Khan (dialogues); Indeevar (lyrics)
- Screenplay by: K. Raghavendra Rao
- Based on: Devatha by K. Raghavendra Rao
- Produced by: D. Rama Naidu
- Starring: Jeetendra; Jaya Prada; Sridevi
- Cinematography: K. S. Prakash
- Edited by: K. A. Marthand
- Music by: Bappi Lahiri
- Production company: Suresh Productions
- Release date: 3 February 1984
- Running time: 160 minutes
- Country: India
- Language: Hindi
- Box office: ₹9 crore (equivalent to ₹141 crore or US$15 million in 2023)

Tohfa (transl. Gift) is a 1984 Indian Hindi-language melodrama comedy film produced by D. Ramanaidu under the Suresh Productions banner and directed by K. Raghavendra Rao. It stars Jeetendra, Jaya Prada and Sridevi. The film was a massive box office success, grossing ₹9 crore and becoming the highest-grossing Indian film of 1984.

The film's narrative follows siblings Janki and Lalita who both fall for Ram, their good friend. When Lalita learn that Janki loves Ram, she steps back and allows her sister to marry him. It was a remake of Raghavendra Rao's Telugu blockbuster Devatha (1982), with Sridevi and Jaya Prada reprising their roles.

At the 32nd Filmfare Awards, Tohfa received three nominations: Best Comic Actor (Kapoor), Best Music and Best Lyrics "Pyaar Ka Tohfa Tera."

== Plot ==
Janaki and Lalita are sisters who love each other dearly. Lalita and Ram fall passionately in love with each other. Unknown to them, Janaki is also in love with Ram. When Lalita finds out, she decides to sacrifice her relationship with Ram. In haste, she marries a good-for-nothing man, who is arrested by the police immediately afterward. Unaware of Lalita's true motive, Ram and Janaki are furious with her.

Lalita moves away and is not seen for several years. Ram and Janaki get married and live happily; their only sorrow is their inability to have children. Many years later, Ram meets Lalita again. She is working in an office and singlehandedly bringing up her son. To his shock, Ram realizes that he is the father of Lalita's son. The child had been conceived in a moment of passion between Ram and Lalita before they separated. Ram is torn between his loyalty to his wife Janaki and the pull of affection towards his son. Janaki, now expecting a child, finds out about her sister's reappearance but misunderstands the whole situation. She begins to suspect Ram and Lalita of cheating on her. However, at last, all the misunderstandings are cleared up. The true extent of Lalita's sacrifice becomes known to Janaki, who feel very guilty. Janaki gives birth to a daughter and passes away, leaving the baby and Ram in Lalita's care.

== Cast ==
- Jeetendra as Ram
- Jaya Prada as Janki
- Sridevi as Lalita
- Kader Khan as Raghuveer Singh
- Shakti Kapoor as Kaamesh Singh
- Asrani as Poojari
- Aruna Irani
- Jagdeep
- Leela Mishra as Dadi
- Mohan Choti as Jamoore

== Soundtrack ==
All songs are composed by Bappi Lahiri and lyrics are penned by Indeevar. The song "Ek Aankh Maroon To" was renamed as "Bhankas" from the movie, Baaghi 3. The singers are sung by Dev Negi, Bappi Lahiri and Jonita Gandhi. The music is composed by Tanishk Bagchi.

Song	Singer	Raga
"Albela Mausam Kehta Hai Swagatam"	Kishore Kumar, Lata Mangeshkar	
"Gori Tere Ang Ang Mein Roop Rang Ke Bhare Hue"	Kishore Kumar, Asha Bhosle	
"Ek Aankh Maroon To Parda Hat Jaye"	Kishore Kumar, Asha Bhosle	
"Pyar Ka Tohfa Tera Bana Hai Jeevan Mera"	Kishore Kumar, Asha Bhosle	
"Milan Maujon Se Maujon Ka"	Asha Bhosle, S. P. Balasubrahmanyam	Jog (raga)

== Marketing and reception ==
Producer D. Rama Naidu employed huge billboards and cut outs for film's publicity before its release and managed to create considerable public interest. Upon its release, Tohfa was immediately noticed for its item number "Pyar Ka Tohfa Tera" picturised on Jaya Prada and "Ek Ankh Marun To" with “Gori Tere Ang Ang Mein”, picturised on Sridevi sung by Asha Bhonsle, which became chartbusters.

== Awards ==
32nd Filmfare Awards:

Nominated

- Best Comedian – Shakti Kapoor
- Best Music Director – Bappi Lahiri
- Best Lyricist – Indeevar for "Tohfa Tere Pyaar Ka"

== Legacy ==
The dialogue "Aaoo Lalita" used by Shakti Kapoor became popular and Kapoor named his restaurant after the dialogue in 2017.
