= DISHA (spacecraft) =

Indian space mission to study effects of space weather on Earth's upper atmosphere

- Names: DISHA-H and DISHA-L
- Mission type: Aeronomy
- Operator: ISRO
- Mission duration: Planned: 5 years (with 3 years of combined operations)

Start of mission
- Launch site: SDSC-SHAR

Orbital parameters
- Reference system: Geocentric
- Regime: LEO
- Perigee altitude: 400-450 km
- Apogee altitude: 400-450 km
- Inclination: DISHA-H: ~85.0° DISHA-L: 25.0°
- Period: 92.5 minutes

Instruments
- Neutral Mass Spectrometer (NM); Airglow Photometer (AP); Drift Meter (DM); Auroral X-ray Imaging Spectrometer (AXIS); High frequency Langmuir Probe (LM); Electron Temperature Analyser (ETA); Upper Atmosphere Visible Airglow Spectral Imager (UrVASI)

The Disturbed and quiet time Ionosphere-thermosphere System at High Altitudes (DISHA) is a proposed twin satellite aeronomy mission by ISRO. It will study the effects of space weather events on the uppermost layers of Earth's atmosphere. The mission will consist of two small satellites namely DISHA-H and DISHA-L in high and low inclinations for simultaneous observation in polar and equatorial regions. DISHA satellites will have expected mission life of 5 years with at least 3 years of combined operations and are expecting readiness by 2024–25.

The twin Aeronomy satellites will be placed into different orbits DISHA-H (High inclination, > 85°) and DISHA-L (Low inclination, ~25°), both at ~ 400 km altitude, aim to decouple latitudinal and longitudinal variations for effective space weather forecasting. The spacecraft is in the process of receiving internal clearances from ISRO.

== Payloads ==
DISHA-H and DISHA-L are similar in configuration with six common payloads each. But while DISHA-L has all of its six scientific payloads on fixed platform, DISHA-H has an additional scientific payload called Auroral X-ray Imaging Spectrometer (AXIS) and all seven of them are positioned on a rotatable deck to meet data transmission requirements.

- Neutral Mass Spectrometer (NMS) by Space Physics Laboratory (SPL) to measure neutral composition (1-300 amu) with 10° FOV
- Airglow Photometer (AP): Narrow bandwidth (0.03 nm) photometer by PRL with 3° FOV to measure nightside airglow emissions in two wavelengths (630 nm, 777.4 nm).
- Drift meter: Ion drift meter with retarding potential analyser (1 to 40 amu) by PRL and SAC with 45° FOV.
- Auroral X-ray Imaging Spectrometer (AXIS) by URSC and PRL is nadir facing soft X-ray spectrometer (0.3 to 2 KeV) with 110° FOV and 5 km resolution.
- High frequency Langmuir probe (LP): Two novel high frequency Langmuir probes developed by PRL to measure electron density and fluctuations. In double mounted configuration One probe will perform the sweep and other will monitor plasma potential.
- Electron Temperature Analyser (ETA) by SPL
- Upper Atmosphere Visible Airglow Spectral Imager (UrVASI) by SPL, by SAC and IIT Roorkee to measure nightglow emission from 80 to 500 km altitude range (2 km resolution) in two channels (585 to 595 nm, 530-780 nm with 0.1 nm, 0.5 nm resolution) and 12° FOV

== See also ==
- TRISHNA
