= Smita Patil filmography =

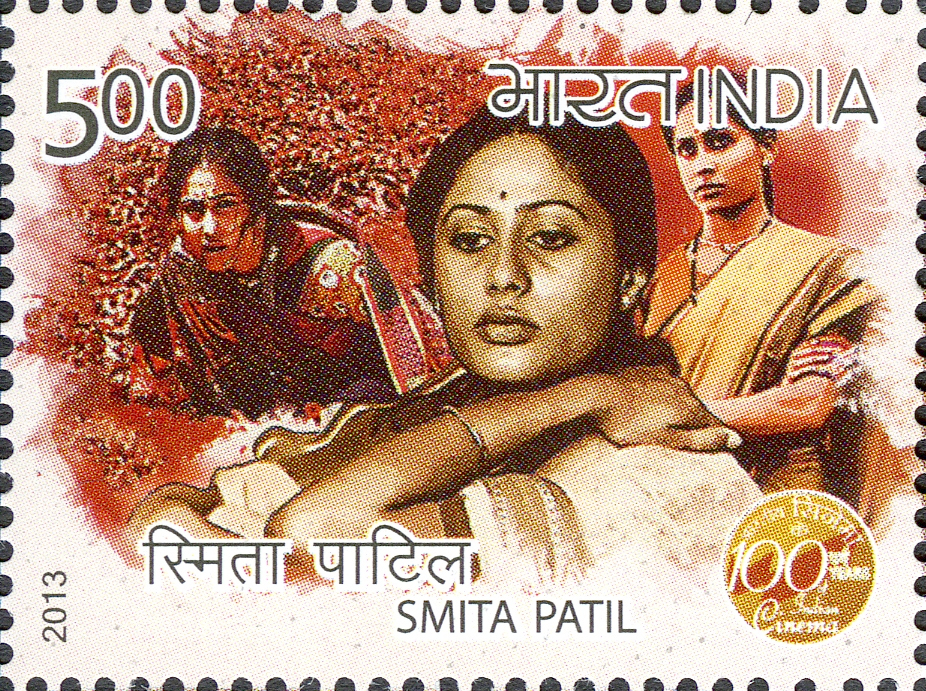
Patil on a 2013 stamp of India

Smita Patil (17 October 1955 – 13 December 1986) was an Indian film and theatre actress. Patil is regarded among the finest and greatest stage and film actresses in the history of Indian cinema. She appeared in over 80 films in several languages, but mostly in Hindi and Marathi, in a career that spanned just over a decade. Patil is a recipient of two National Film Awards, a Filmfare Award, two Filmfare Awards Marathi and received the Padma Shri, India's fourth-highest civilian honour in 1985.

Patil made her film debut with Shyam Benegal's Charandas Chor (1975). She became one of the leading actresses of parallel cinema, a New Wave movement in India cinema, though she also appeared in several mainstream movies throughout her career. Her performances were highly acclaimed, and her most notable roles include Manthan (1977), Bhumika (1977) for which she won her first National Film Award for Best Actress, Jait Re Jait (1978), Aakrosh (1980), Chakra (1981) which earned her a second National Film Award for Best Actress and her first and only Filmfare Award for Best Actress, Namak Halaal (1982), Bazaar (1982), Umbartha (1982), Shakti (1982), Arth (1982), Ardh Satya (1983), Mandi (1983), Aaj Ki Awaaz (1984), Chidambaram (1985), Mirch Masala (1985), Amrit (1986) and Waaris (1988).

Apart from acting, Patil was an active feminist and a member of the Women's Centre in Mumbai. She was deeply committed to the advancement of women's issues and gave her endorsement to films which sought to explore the role of women in traditional Indian society, their sexuality, and the changes facing the middle-class woman in an urban milieu. She died on 13 December 1986 at the age of 31 due to childbirth complications. Over ten of her films were released after her death.

== Films ==
Year	Title	Role	Language	Notes	Ref.
1974	Raja Shiv Chhatrapati	Saibai	Hindi-Marathi	Bilingual	
1975	Samna	Kamley	Marathi		
1975	Nishant	Rukmani	Hindi		
1975	Charandas Chor	Rajkumari	Hindi		
1976	Manthan	Bindu	Hindi		
1977	Bhumika	Usha/Urvashi Dalvi	Hindi	Won - National Film Award for Best Actress, Nominated – Filmfare Award for Best Actress	
1977	Saal Solvan Chadya	Pinky	Punjabi		
1977	Jait Re Jait	Chindhi	Marathi	Won - Filmfare Award for Best Actress Marathi	
1978	Kondura/ Anugraham	Parvati	Hindi-Telugu	Bilingual	
1978	Gaman	Khairun Hussain	Hindi		
1980	Sarvasakshi	Sujatha	Marathi		
1980	The Naxalites	Ajitha	Hindi		
1980	Albert Pinto Ko Gussa Kyon Aata Hai	Joan	Hindi		
1980	Aakrosh	Nagi Lahanya	Hindi		
1981	Bhavani Bhavai	Ujaan	Gujarati		
1981	Chakra	Amma	Hindi	Won - National Film Award for Best Actress and Filmfare Award for Best Actress	
1981	Tajurba	Pinki	Hindi		
1981	Sadgati	Jhuria	Hindi	TV movie	
1981	Akaler Sandhane	Herself	Bengali		
1982	Namak Halaal	Poonam	Hindi		
1982	Bazaar	Najma	Hindi	Nominated – Filmfare Award for Best Actress	
1982	Badle Ki Aag	Bijli	Hindi		
1982	Dil-E-Nadaan	Sheela	Hindi		
1982	Shakti	Roma Devi	Hindi		
1982	Arth	Kavita Sanyal	Hindi	Nominated – Filmfare Award for Best Supporting Actress	
1982	Umbartha	Sulabha Mahajan	Marathi	Won - Filmfare Award for Best Actress Marathi and Maharashtra State Film Awards for Best Actress	
1982	Sitam	Meenakshi	Hindi		
1982	Dard Ka Rishta	Dr. Anuradha	Hindi		
1982	Bheegi Palkein	Shanti	Hindi		
1982	Naseeb Ni Balihari		Gujarati		
1983	Chatpati	Chatpatee	Hindi		
1983	Ghungroo	Kesarbai	Hindi		
1983	Qayamat	Shashi	Hindi		
1983	Ardh Satya	Jyotsna Gokhale	Hindi		
1983	Mandi	Zeenat	Hindi	Nominated – Filmfare Award for Best Supporting Actress	
1983	Haadsa	Asha	Hindi		
1983	Anveshane	Revati	Kannada		
1984	Farishta	Kashibai	Hindi		
1984	Sharaabi	Dancer	Hindi	Guest appearance in song "Jahan Char Yaar Mil Jaye"	
1984	Hum Do Hamare Do	Aarati	Hindi		
1984	Aaj Ki Aawaz	Rajni Deshmukh	Hindi	Nominated – Filmfare Award for Best Actress	
1984	Raavan	Ganga	Hindi		
1984	Pet Pyaar Aur Paap		Hindi		
1984	Kasam Paida Karne Wale Ki	Aarti	Hindi		
1984	Tarang	Janki	Hindi		
1984	Shapath	Shanti	Hindi		
1984	Meraa Dost Meraa Dushman	Lali	Hindi		
1984	Kanoon Meri Mutthi Mein	Roma	Hindi		
1984	Giddh	Hanumi	Hindi		
1984	Anand Aur Anand	Kiran	Hindi		
1985	Jawab	Rajni/Radha/Salma	Hindi		
1985	Ghulami	Sumitra Singh	Hindi		
1985	Meraa Ghar Mere Bachche	Geeta Bhargav	Hindi		
1985	Aakhir Kyon?	Nisha	Hindi		
1985	Chidambaram	Shivakaami	Malayalam		
1986	Sutradhar	Prerna	Hindi		
1986	Kaanch Ki Deewar	Nisha	Hindi		
1986	Dilwaala	Sumitra Devi	Hindi		
1986	Aap Ke Saath	Ganga	Hindi		
1986	Mirch Masala	Sonbai	Hindi	Won - BFJA Award for Best Actress (Hindi)	
1986	Amrit	Kamla Shrivastav	Hindi		
1986	Anokha Rishta	Dr. Padma Kapoor	Hindi		
1986	Dahleez	Sukhbir Kaur	Hindi		
1986	Mere Saath Chal	Geeta	Hindi		
1986	Angaarey	Arti Varma	Hindi		

== Posthumous releases ==
Year	Title	Role	Notes	Ref.
1987	Insaniyat Ke Dushman	Lakshmi Nath		
1987	Nazrana	Mukta		
1987	Debshishu	Seeta	Bengali film	
1987	Dance Dance	Radha		
1987	Raahee	Rano / Sandhya		
1987	Ahsaan			
1987	Awam	Dr. Shabnam		
1987	Thikana	Shashi Goel		
1987	Aaj	Kavita		
1987	Sher Shivaji			
1988	Hum Farishte Nahin	Roma		
1988	Waaris	Paramjit	Voice dubbed by Rekha	
1988	Akarshan	Herself	Special appearance	
1989	Oonch Neech Beech	Sumati	Delayed release	
1990	Galiyon Ka Badshah	Tulsi	Delayed release	
