= Dahiwad, Shirpur =

Village in Maharashtra, India

Dahiwad
- village
- Location within Maharashtra Location within India
- Coordinates: 21.342507°N 74.943731°E
- Country: India
- State: Maharashtra
- District: Dhule district
- Taluka: Shirpur

Dahiwad is a village in Shirpur taluka of Dhule district in the state of Maharashtra, India. The village has the Smita Patil Public School run by the Smita Patil Charitable Trust under the chairmanship of Shivajirao Girdhar Patil, father of Hindi film actress Smita Patil in whose memory the school is founded. The school's mission is to impart quality education to students in rural area.
