= Chitrapatha.com =

- Founded: March 2021; 5 years ago
- Founder: Shashidhar Chitradurga
- Website: chitrapatha.com

Chitrapatha.com is an Indian Kannada-language cinema history portal started by journalist Shashidhar Chitradurga in 2021.

== History ==
Shashidhar Chitradurga created a photo book called Chitrapatha that featured a compilation of photos by still photographer Ashwatha Narayana. It was published by the Karnataka Chalanachitra Academy and was officially released on 4 July 2015. The compilation features 400 rare photos since the 1970s for several films. The book also highlights the history of Kannada cinema including the careers of Dr. Rajkumar, S. Siddalingaiah, Puttanna Kanagal, Hunsur Krishnamurthy and Dwarakish from Ashwatha Narayana's experience.

In March 2021, Shashidhar Chitradurga started a website of the same name. A continuation of the book, the website details the 90 year history of the Kannada film industry and additionally features photographs from Bhavani Lakshminarayan. The website's title is based on films from the olden days and additionally includes a trivia section for technicians who remain ultimately unknown. The website also features inputs from other writers and features information about non-Kannada films such as Garm Hava (1973; directed by M. S. Sathyu) and Mirch Masala (1979).
