= Anand Aur Anand =

- Poster
- Directed by: Dev Anand
- Story by: Suraj Sanim
- Produced by: Dev Anand
- Starring: Dev Anand; Raakhee; Suneil Anand; Raj Babbar; Smita Patil; Natasha Sinha; Biswajit Chatterjee
- Cinematography: D. K. Prabhakar
- Music by: Rahul Dev Burman
- Release date: 10 August 1984 (India)
- Language: Hindi

Anand Aur Anand (lit. 'Anand and Anand') is a 1984 Indian film, which is most famous for being the debut movie of both Dev Anand's son, Suneil Anand as well as Natasha Sinha and famous playback singer Abhijeet Bhattacharya. It stars Dev Anand along with Suneil Anand, Natasha Sinha, Raakhee, Smita Patil, Raj Babbar, and Biswajit Chatterjee.

== Plot ==
Arun Anand (Dev Anand) has been married for several years now, but his wife (Raakhee) is unable to conceive. Arun has an affair with his personal secretary, Kiran (Smita Patil), and as a result Kiran gets pregnant. Arun does not want a scandal to upset his wife, so he asks an impotent union leader, Pratap Singh (Raj Babbar), to marry Kiran, sire the child, and then divorce her, all for a hefty sum of money. Pratap agrees to this arrangement, and soon a boy is born. Pratap then changes his mind about divorcing Kiran, as her son is proof of his virility and manhood, and as such disappears from Arun's life. Years later Kiran's son has grown up and named Varun Singh (Suneil Anand). Arun finally finds out about them and meets them, but is rejected by Varun, who has come to accept Pratap as his father. There is a confrontation between Pratap and his employer, Thakur (Biswajit Chatterjee), and as a result, Varun is abducted, tied to a tree with four wild elephants who are made to drink alcohol, and after which will go on a drunken and virtually unstoppable rampage - starting with the gory death of the person nearest to them - Varun.

== Cast ==
- Dev Anand as Arun Anand
- Suneil Anand as Varun Singh
- Raj Babbar as Pratap Singh, Union Leader
- Rakhee Gulzar as Mrs. Arun Anand
- Smita Patil as Kiran
- Natasha Sinha as Rachna Thakur, Varun's girlfriend
- Rakesh Bedi as Ravi
- Biswajit Chatterjee as Thakur

== Crew ==
- Director: Dev Anand
- Producer: Dev Anand
- Story: Suraj Sanim
- Cinematographer: D. K. Prabhakar

== Soundtrack ==
All lyrics are written by Anjaan; all music is composed by R. D. Burman.

No.	Title	Singer(s)	Length
1.	"Hum Kya Hain"	Kishore Kumar, Pinaaz Masani
2.	"Mere Liye Soona Soona"	Kishore Kumar
3.	"Wadon Ki Sham Aai"	Kishore Kumar, Asha Bhosle & Abhijeet Bhattacharya
4.	"Lag Jaa Gale Se"	Kishore Kumar, Pinaaz Masani, Dilraj Kaur, Shailendra Singh
5.	"Main Awara Hi Sahi"	Abhijeet Bhattacharya
6.	"Nasha Hai Mujhe Bhi"	Lata Mangeshkar & Abhijeet Bhattacharya
