= Habib Tanvir =

Indian actor (1923–2009)

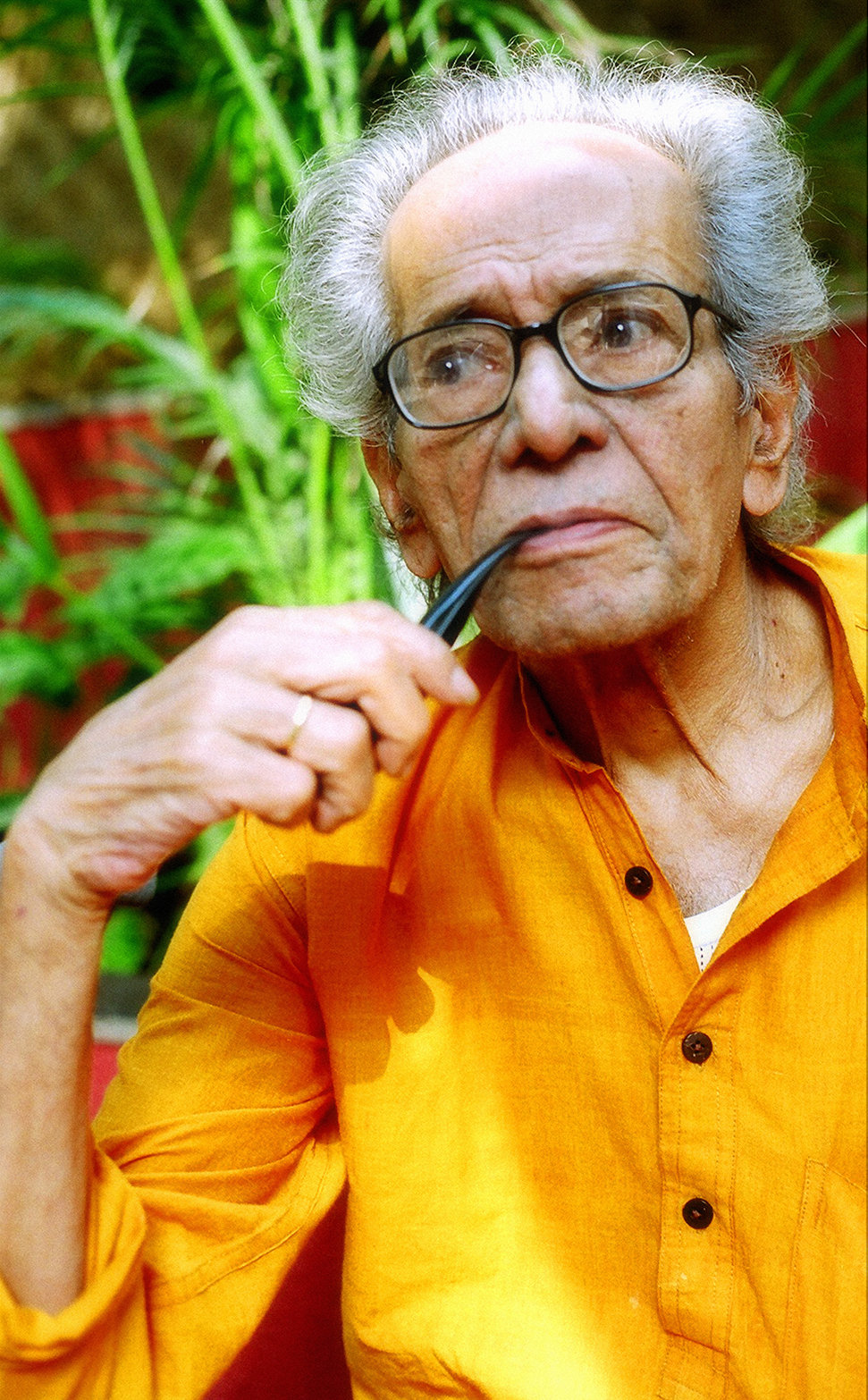
- Habib Tanvir at Prithvi Theatre, Mumbai; November 2005
- Born: Habib Ahmed Khan; 1 September 1923; Raipur, Central Provinces and Berar, British India
- Died: 8 June 2009 (aged 85); Singrauli, Madhya Pradesh, India
- Occupations: Playwright, dramatist, poet, actor
- Years active: 1945–2009
- Spouse: Moneeka Misra (2001-2005)
- Children: Anna (b.1964); Nageen (b. 1964)
- Honours: Padma Shri (1983) Padma Bhushan (2002)

Habib Tanvir (1 September 1923 – 8 June 2009) was one of the most popular Indian Urdu playwrights, a theatre director, poet and actor. He was the writer of plays such as, Agra Bazar (1954) and Charandas Chor (1975). A pioneer in Urdu and Hindi theatre, he was most known for his work with Chhattisgarhi tribals, at the Naya Theatre, a theatre company he founded in 1959 in Bhopal. He went on to include indigenous performance forms such as nacha, to create not only a new theatrical language, but also milestones such as Charandas Chor, Gaon ka Naam Sasural, Mor Naam Damad and Kamdeo ka Apna Basant Ritu ka Sapna.

For him, true "theatre of the people" existed in the villages, which he strived to bring to the urban "educated", employing folk performers as actors alongside urban actors. He died on 8 June 2009 at Bhopal after a three-week illness. Upon his death, he was the last of pioneering actor-managers in Indian theatre, which included Sisir Bhaduri, Utpal Dutt and Prithviraj Kapoor, and often he managed plays with a mammoth cast, such as Charandas Chor (Charandas the thief), which included an orchestra of 72 people on stage and Agra Bazaar, with 52 people.

During his lifetime he won several national and international awards, including the Sangeet Natak Akademi Award in 1969, Jawaharlal Nehru Fellowship in 1979, Padma Shri in 1983, Kalidas Samman 1990, Sangeet Natak Akademi Fellowship in 1996, and the Padma Bhushan in 2002. He had also been nominated to become a member of the Upper House of Indian Parliament, the Rajya Sabha (1972–1978). His play Charandas Chor won him the Fringe Firsts Award at Edinburgh International Drama Festival in 1982, and in 2007, it was included in the Hindustan Times' list of 'India's 60 Best works since Independence which said: "an innovative dramaturgy equally impelled by Brecht and folk idioms, Habib Tanvir seduces across language barriers in this his all-time biggest hit about a Robin Hood-style thief."

== Biography ==
=== Early life ===
He was born in Raipur, Chhattisgarh (erstwhile Madhya Pradesh) to Hafiz Ahmed Khan, who hailed from Peshawar. He passed his matriculation from Laurie Municipal High School, Raipur, and later completed his B.A. from Morris College, Nagpur in 1944. Thereafter he studied M.A. for a year at Aligarh Muslim University . Early in life, he started writing poetry using his pen name Takhallus. Soon after, he assumed his name, Habib Tanvir.

=== Career ===
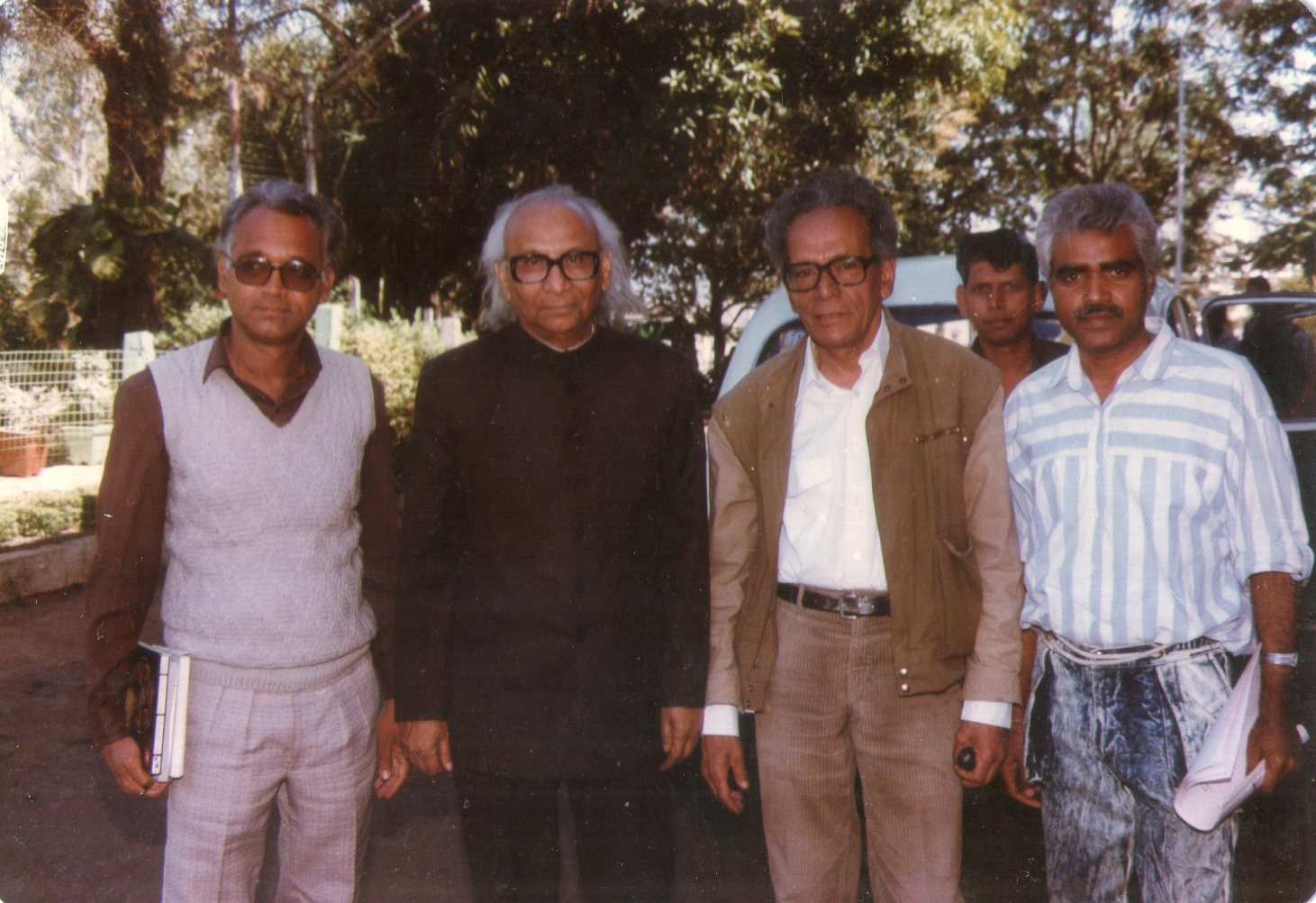
Khalid Abidi, Prof. Desnavi Playwright Habib Tanvir.

In 1945, he moved to Bombay, and joined All India Radio (AIR) Bombay as a producer. While in Bombay, he wrote songs for Urdu and Hindi films and even acted in a few of them. He also joined the Progressive Writers' Association (PWA) and became an integral part of Indian People's Theatre Association (IPTA) as an actor. Later, when most of the prominent IPTA members were imprisoned for opposing the British rule, he was asked to take over the organisation.

In 1954, he moved to New Delhi, and worked with Qudsia Zaidi's Hindustani Theatre, and also worked with Children's theatre, where he authored many plays. Later in the same year, he produced his first significant play Agra Bazar based on the works and times of the plebeian 18th-century Urdu poet, Nazir Akbarabadi, an older poet in the generation of Mirza Ghalib. For this play he brought together local residents and folk artistes from Okhla village in Delhi and students of Jamia Millia Islamia creating a palette never seen before in Indian theatre. Additionally, the play was not staged in a confined space, rather a bazaar, a marketplace. After this, he continued to work with non-trained actors and folk artistes like the folk artists of Chhattisgarh.

=== Stay in Europe ===
In 1955, when he was in his 30s, Habib moved to England. There, he trained in Acting at Royal Academy of Dramatic Arts (RADA)(1955) and in Direction at Bristol Old Vic Theatre School (1956). For the next two years, he travelled through Europe, watching various theatre activities. One of the highlights of this period, was his eight-month stay in Berlin in 1956, during which he got to see several plays of Bertolt Brecht, produced by Berliner Ensemble, just a few months after Brecht's death. This proved to have a lasting influence on him, as in the coming years, he started using local idioms in his plays, to express trans-cultural tales and ideologies. This, over the years, gave rise to a "theatre of roots", which was marked by an utter simplicity in style, presentation and technique, yet remaining eloquent and powerfully experiential.

=== Return to India ===
A deeply inspired Habib returned to India in 1958 and took to directing full-time. He produced Mitti ki Gaadi a post-London play, based on Shudraka's Sanskrit work, Mrichakatika. It became his first important production in Chhattisgarhi. This was the result of the work he had been doing since his return – working with six folk actors from Chhattisgarh. He went on to found "Naya Theatre", a theatre company in 1959.

In his exploratory phase, i.e. 1970–73, he broke free from one more theatre restriction – he no longer made the folk artistes, who had been performing in all his plays, speak Hindi. Instead, the artistes switched to Chhattisgarhi, a local language they were more accustomed to. Later, he even started experimenting with "Pandavani", a folk singing style from the region and temple rituals. This made his plays stand out amidst the gamut of plays which still employed traditional theatre techniques like blocking movements or fixing lights on paper. Spontaneity and improvisation became the hallmark of his new theatre style, where the folk artistes were allowed greater freedom of expression.

His next venture with Chhattisgarhi Nach style, saw another breakthrough in 1972, with a staging of the play titled Gaon Ka Naam Sasural, Mor Naam Damaad. This was based on a comic folk tale, where an old man falls in love with a young woman, who eventually elopes with another young man.

By the time he produced his seminal play, Charandas Chor in 1975, the technique became popular. This play immediately established a whole new idiom in modern India theatre; whose highlight was Nach – a chorus that provided commentary through song. He also brought in Govind Ram Nirmalkar, a noted Nacha artist who would later go on to win Padma Shri and Sangeet Natak Akademi Awards, to play the lead role. Later, he collaborated with Shyam Benegal, when he adapted the play to a feature-length film, by the same name, starring Smita Patil and Lalu Ram. He was awarded the prestigious Jawarharlal Nehru Fellowship in 1979 for research on Relevance of Tribal Performing Arts and their Adaptability to A changing Environment. In 1980, he directed the play Moti Ram ka Satyagraha for Janam (Jan Natya Manch) on the request of Safdar Hashmi.

During his career, Habib has acted in over nine feature films, including Richard Attenborough's film, Gandhi (1982), Black and White and in a yet-to-be-released film on the Bhopal gas tragedy.

His first brush with controversy came about in the 1990s, with his production of a traditional Chhattisgarhi play about religious hypocrisy, Ponga Pandit. The play was based on a folk tale and had been created by Chhattisgarhi theatre artists in the 1930s. Though he had been producing it since the sixties, in the changed social climate after the Babri Masjid demolition, the play caused quite an uproar amongst Hindu fundamentalists, especially the Rashtriya Swayamsewak Sangh (RSS), whose supporters disrupted many of its shows, and even emptied the auditoriums, yet he continued to show it all over.

His Chhattisgarhi folk troupe, surprised again, with his rendition of Asghar Wajahat's Jisne Lahore Nahin Dekhya in 1992. Then in 1993 came Kamdeo Ka Apna Basant Ritu Ka Sapna, Tanvir's Hindi adaptation of Shakespeare's A Midsummer Night's Dream. In 1995, he was invited to the United States by the Chicago Actors Ensemble, where he wrote his only English language play, The Broken Bridge. In 2002, he directed Zahareeli Hawa, a translation of Bhopal by the Canadian-Indian playwright Rahul Varma, based on the Bhopal Gas Tragedy. During his illustrious career he brought works from all genres to stage, from ancient Sanskrit works by Shudraka, Bhasa, Vishakhadatta and Bhavabhuti; to European classics by Shakespeare, Molière and Goldoni; modern masters Brecht, Garcia, Lorca, Gorky, and Oscar Wilde; Tagore, Asghar Wajahat, Shankar Shesh, Safdar Hashmi, Rahul Varma, stories by Premchand, Stefan Zweig and Vijaydan Detha, apart from an array of Chhattisgarhi folk tales.

== Legacy ==
In 2010, at the 12th Bharat Rang Mahotsav, the annual theatre festival of National School of Drama, Delhi, a tribute exhibition dedicated to life, works and theatre of Habib Tanvir and B.V. Karanth was displayed. The 13th Bharat Rang Mahotsav opened with an Assamese adaptation of his classic play Charandas Chor, directed by Anup Hazarika, a NSD graduate.

== Awards ==
He was the recipient of

1. Sangeet Natak Akademy Award(1969),
2. Jawaharlal Nehru Fellowship(1979),
3. Padma Shri (1983),
4. Padma Bhushan(2002),

among other national and international awards during his lifetime.

== Plays ==
- Agra Bazar (1954)
- Shatranj Ke Mohrey (1954)
- Lala Shoharat Rai (1954)
- Mitti Ki Gaadi (1958)
- Gaon Ke Naon Sasural, Mor Naon Damand (1973)
- Charandas Chor (1975)
- Uttar Ram Charitra (1977)
- Bahadur Kalarin (1978)
- Ponga Pandit (1960s)
- Ek Aurat Hypathia Bhi Thee (1980s)
- Jis Lahore Nai Dekhya (1990)
- Kamdeo ka Apna Basant Ritu ka Sapna (1993)
- The Broken Bridge (1995)
- Zahreeli Hawa (2002)
- Raj Rakt (2006)
- Kartoos (?)
- Dekh Rahe Hai Nyan
- Hirma Ki Amar Kahani
- He also came up with his own versions of Basant Retu ka Sapna, Shajapur ki Shanti Bai, Mitti ki Gari and Mudrarakhsas.

== Filmography ==
- Rahi (1952) - Ramu
- Foot Path (1953)
- Charandas Chor (1975) (lyrics and script)
- Staying On (1980) (TV) - Dr. Mitra
- Gandhi (1982) - Indian barrister
- Man-Eaters of Kumaon (1986) (TV) - Bahadur
- Yeh Woh Manzil To Nahin (1987) - Akhtar Baig
- Hero Hiralal (1988)
- Prahaar: The Final Attack (1991) - Joe D'Souza, father of Peter D'Souza
- The Burning Season (1993) - Raja Sahib
- Sardar (1993)
- Mangal Pandey: The Rising (2005) - Bahadur Shah Zafar
- Black & White (2008) - Quazi Saab (final film role)

== Bibliography ==
- Rang Habib – Critical Appreciation of Habib Tanveer's Works, Written by Shri B. R. Bhargava, Published by National School of Drama, 2006ISBN 81-8197-012-8
- Charandas Chor. Tr. by Anjum Katyal. Seagull Books, 1996. ISBN 81-7046-108-1
- Use of Music and Dance in Contemporary Dramatic Performances
- The Buddhist Theatre of Tibet
- The Living Tale of Hirma: Hirma Ki Amar Kahani. Calcutta, Seagull Books, 2005. ISBN 81-7046-277-0
- Janam comes of Age by Habib Tanvir, 1988 Theatre of the streets: the Jana Natya Manch experience, by Arjun Ghosh, Jana Naṭya Mancha, edited by Sudhanva Deshpande. Published by Jana Natya Manch, 2007
- Gaon ke Naon Theatre, Mor Naon Habib (documentary film), dirs. Sanjay Maharishi and Sudhanva Deshpande, 2005
- One Day in the Life of Ponga Pandit (documentary film), dirs. Sanjay Maharishi and Sudhanva Deshpande, 2005
- Tanvir ka safarnama (documentary film), dir. Ranjan Kamath. 2008

== Notable Disciple ==
- Omkar Das Manikpuri

== See also ==
- Theatre in India
