= Maithili Rao =

Maithali Rao
- Born: 1943 (age 82–83); Hyderabad, Hyderabad State, India
- Occupations: Author; Journalist; Film Critic; Lecturer; Subtitlist
- Spouse: Shyam Rao (m. 1967)
- Children: Shamita Dewan
- Writing career
- Language: English, Hindi, Kannada, Telugu

Maithili Rao is an Indian freelance film critic, author, journalist, and former English lecturer based in Mumbai. She has worked for several publications, including The Hindu, Frontline, Film Comment, the Sunday Observer, Gentleman, The Independent, and Screen.

== Career ==
Rao worked as a journalist for The Hindu, Frontline, Film Comment, Gentleman, Man's World, Cinema in India, and South Asian Cinema; the latter two were published by the National Film Development Corporation of India and South Asian Cinema Foundation, which was based in London. She wrote the column "Image of Women" in the newspaper Eye's Weekly for ten years. She is also a film critic for the Sunday Observer, The Independent, Screen, The Free Press Journal, Bombay, and Zee Premiere. In 2003, she contributed to the Encyclopaedia of Hindi Cinema, an encyclopaedia book about Hindi cinema that was published by Popular Prakashan.

Rao served as a jury at The Golden Elephant (also known as International Children's Film Festival India) and the Mumbai International Film Festival. She has authored one book, titled Smita Patil: A Brief Incandescence, a biographical book on the Indian actress Smita Patil published by HarperCollins. According to the Indo-Asian News Service, "The book is not only a long-pending due to this accomplished but instinctive actress but also an invaluable distillation of some of the best of Indian cinema, which could easily rise above mindless escapism to sensitively portray society and its inequities and injustices—especially towards women, whose plight Smita can so touchingly render." The Times of India listed it amongst the "top 25 good reads" of 2015.

== Bibliography ==
- Rao, Maithili (2015). Smita Patil: A Brief Incandescence. HarperCollins. ISBN 978-93-51775-12-6.
- Rao, Maithili; Bhattacharya, Rinki Roy (2022). The Oldest Love Story : A Motherhood Anthology. Om Books International. ISBN 978-93-92834-36-3.
- Rao, Maithili (2023). The Millennial Woman in Bollywood: A New 'Brand'?. Oxford University Press. ISBN 978-01-90130-47-3.
- Rao, Maithili; Bhattacharya, Rinki Roy (2025). Travel Tales and Close Encounters. Mind u Read. ISBN 978-81-93677-35-3.
