= Akarshan =

- Directed by: Tanvir Ahmed
- Produced by: Pramod Kumar Saraswat
- Starring: Akbar Khan; Sonu Walia
- Music by: Ajit Singh
- Release date: 7 October 1988
- Country: India
- Language: Hindi

Akarshan is a 1988 Bollywood romantic film directed by Tanvir Ahmed. The film stars Akbar Khan and Sonu Walia in lead roles.

== Plot ==
Akarshan follows the journey of Priya, an ambitious young actress played by Sonu Walia. While filming a high-risk stunt sequence, her life is put in grave danger, only to be heroically saved by her co-star Abhishek, portrayed by Akbar Khan. This dramatic rescue sparks an instant and powerful bond between them.

As their relationship deepens, Priya falls passionately in love with Abhishek. Their secret meetings, however, face strong opposition from her protective elder sister (Rohini Hattangadi), who vehemently disapproves of the romance. Defying her sister’s wishes, Priya confronts her and eventually runs away in search of Abhishek.

Overwhelmed by despair during her desperate search, Priya attempts suicide but is rescued in time. Eventually, her sister comes to accept their love, allowing the couple to marry. However, happiness is short-lived as Abhishek is left paralyzed in a tragic accident, putting Priya’s loyalty and devotion to the ultimate test as she becomes his caregiver.

The film unfolds in a linear narrative style, beautifully punctuated by emotional song sequences that heighten the romantic and dramatic moments.

== Cast ==
- Akbar Khan as Abhishek
- Sonu Walia as Priya
- Sharon Prabhakar as Shalu
- Rohini Hattangadi as Didi
- Girish Karnad as Director Anand
- Parveen Babi (Special appearance)
- Smita Patil (Special appearance)
- Raj Babbar (Special appearance)
- Deepak Qazir as Siddharth
- Suparna Anand as Suparna
- Nandita Thakur as Doctor

Cameo appearances (Alphabetical order)

- Amitabh Bachchan
- Anil Kapoor
- Anupam Kher
- Feroz Khan
- Hrithik Roshan
- Kirron Kher
- Poonam Dhillon
- Rakesh Roshan
- Rekha
- Rishi Kapoor
- Sanjay Khan
- Shekhar Kapur
- Sridevi
- Suresh Oberoi
- Vinod Khanna
- Yash Chopra
- Zayed Khan

== Music ==
Only the song "O Mere Yaar O Mere Pyar" has music composed by Bappi Lahiri, it was actually for a film titled Mr. Aashiq, but after it was shelved, director Tanvir Ahmed used it in this film.

- "O Mere Yaar O Mere Pyar" –

Kishore Kumar

- "Ae Khuda Yeh Bata, Aisa Hota Hai Kyun" –

Bhupinder Singh

- "Mausam Ka Taqaaza Hai" –

Ajit Singh, Kavita Krishnamurthy

- "Zindagi Waqt Ka Aaina Hai" –

Ajit Singh, Kavita Krishnamurthy

- "Faasla Rahe Na Yeh Aaj Ek Ho Jaaye" –

Kavita Krishnamurthy
