= Bhopal (play) =

- Cover of published play
- Written by: Rahul Varma
- Chorus: Story Teller
- Characters: Dr. Sonya Labonté; Izzat Bai; Devraj Sarthi; Minister Jaganlal Bhandari; Madiha Akram; Pascale Sauvé; Warren Anderson
- Original language: English with some French and Hindi
- Subject: Bhopal disaster
- Setting: Bhopal, India

Premiere
- Date premiered: 2001

Bhopal is a play by Indo-Canadian playwright Rahul Varma about the 1984 Bhopal disaster in India.

== Production history ==
It premiered in 2001 in Montreal, produced by Teesri Duniya and directed by Jack Langedijk. It used a non-realistic, live music, minimalist set and a chorus.

It was translated into Hindi as Zahreeli Hawa in 2003 by translator/director Habib Tanvir.

It was produced by Cahoots Theatre Projects in 2003 at the Theatre Centre in Toronto, directed by Guillermo Verdecchia. The set consisted of a wall of dirty rags and sand on the floor.

It was translated into French in 2005 by translator Paul Lefebvre and performed at Theatre Periscope in Quebec City and in Montreal at the Espace Libre. Directed by Philippe Soldevilla. Eight actors performed all the rolls with doubling and with added dance. The set was made up of wooden blocks moved into different configurations.

Bhopal was published in 2004 by Playwrights Canada Press.
