= Shivajirao Girdhar Patil =

Indian social activist and politician (1925–2017)

- Born: 5 March 1925
- Died: 22 July 2017 (aged 92)
- Other name: Dadasaheb Shivajirao Patil
- Occupations: Social activist, Politician
- Spouse: Vidya Alias Vidyotama Deshmukh
- Children: 3, including Smita Patil
- Awards: Padma Bhushan (2013)

Shivajirao Girdhar Patil (5 March 1925 – 22 July 2017) was an Indian social activist and politician from the state of Maharashtra. He began his social activism at an early age when he participated in the Indian independence movement. Post-independence, he was associated with various political parties and had been member of the Maharashtra Legislative Council, Maharashtra Legislative Assembly and even the Rajya Sabha for one term. In 2013, he was presented with the Padma Bhushan, India's third highest civilian award. He was the father of Indian film actress Smita Patil.

== Biography ==
Patil had been an active politician from a young age, and has been associated with several political parties, including the Communist Party of India (CPI), the Congress party, Samajwadi Party and Bahujan Samaj Party.

Patil began his career as a radical and a freedom fighter, and was attracted to the Communist movement as a teenager. In 1939, aged only 14, he became the president of the All India Students' Federation (AISF), which is the student wing of the Communist Party of India (CPI). Founded in August 1936, the AISF the first national Indian union of students. Through AISF, Patil took part in various activities aimed at subverting British rule in India. Some of these activities were violent, and Patil was arrested, tried and imprisoned for twelve long years. However, he did not serve his sentence and broke out of jail, going undercover in Lucknow for a while, before he was caught out.

Patil was a member of the Maharashtra Legislative Council (Upper House) from 1960 to 1967 and of the Maharashtra Legislative Assembly (Lower House) from 1967 to 1978, contesting and winning the elections of 1967 and 1972 from Shirpur. He served as a minister in the Maharashtra government for two stints: 1968-72 under Vasantrao Naik and 1976-78 under Shankarrao Chavan and Vasantdada Patil. All of these ministers belonged to the Congress party. As minister, Patil handled the portfolios of irrigation, power, protocol, co-operatives and legislative affairs. Later, he also was the member of Rajya Sabha for one term from 1992 to 1998.

Patil was also active in the cooperative movement in the sugar sector in Maharashtra, which has been a highly politicized and politically important sector in the state. In 1981, he helped to start the cooperative sugar factory "Shirpur Sahakari Sakhar Karkhana" in Shirpur, Dhule district. He remained its president for 27 years continuously until 2009, when Vasantrao Patil was elected.^{[Note]} As of 2012, Patil is one of the directors of the National Federation of Cooperative Sugar Factories.

In 1996, under his chairmanship, the Smita Patil Charitable Trust was founded in memory of his daughter, the actress Smita Patil, who had died in childbirth in 1986. The trust runs a Smita Patil Public School in the village of Dahiwad in Shirpur taluka of Dhule district with a mission to impart quality education to students in rural area.

In 2013, the Government of India awarded him the Padma Bhushan for his contribution to public affairs. The award is India's third highest civilian award.

== Personal life and family ==
Patil was married to Vidyatai Patil (née Vidyotama Deshmukh) in an unconventional wedding. Vidyatai had been to some of the talks held by Shivajirao as a freedom fighter and was inspired by his zeal and dedication to the cause. Though betrothed to another man, she sent Shivajirao a note saying she would like to join his fight for freedom. They were both atheists and non-ritualistic and their wedding was solemnised by Sane Guruji. The marriage, conducted in 1938, lasted for 77 years Vidyatai Patil died in March 2015. The marriage remained harmonious and rock-solid through all the travails of a life that included imprisonment for 12 years, the glory of ministerial power and status, the tumultuous personal life and death of a film-star daughter, and the need to raise her new-born orphan son. The Patils were the parents of three daughters, namely Anita, Smita and Manya. Anita was married to Shankar Deshmukh, the couple have two sons, (Varoon and Adeetya Deshmukh). Anita currently resides in Mumbai and is the executive director of PUKAR. Anita's granddaughter is named Zoë Smita Deshmukh after her late sister, Smita. The third and youngest daughter, Manya Seth, is a former costume designer, and serves as president of The Smita Patil Foundation.

The couple's second daughter, Smita Patil, began her career as a newsreader but quickly moved to films. She became a critically acclaimed Hindi film actress and won several awards for her performances. She informally married the actor-turned-politician Raj Babbar, who was already married to Nadira Babbar, by whom he already had two children. Smita became pregnant by this relationship and gave birth to a son in December 1986. She died immediately after giving birth to the child, due to complications arising from childbirth. At this time, Patil and his wife had both crossed their 60th birthdays. Nevertheless, they assumed the responsibility of raising the new-born baby, who grew up to become the actor Prateik Babbar. Prateik, who only had sporadic and occasional contact with his father Raj Babbar, looked upon Shivajirao Patil and Vidyatai Patil as his parents for all practical purposes. Prateik hence regards his grandmother as "Ma" (mother).

== Notes ==
^{^[Note]}Vasantrao Uttamrao Patil is not to be confused with Vasantdada Patil, ex-Chief Minister of Maharashtra. And Shivajirao Girdhar Patil is not to be confused with Maharashtra Chief Minister Shivajirao Nilangekar Patil.
