= Kaanch Ki Deewar =

- Promotional Poster
- Directed by: M.N. Yasin
- Produced by: Kamal Chowdhary
- Starring: Sanjeev Kumar; Smita Patil
- Music by: Shankar Singh Raghuvanshi
- Release date: 31 January 1986 (India)
- Country: India
- Language: Hindi

Kaanch Ki Deewar (transl. Walls of glass) is a 1986 Indian Hindi-language drama film directed by M.N. Yasin and produced by Kamal Chowdhary. It stars Sanjeev Kumar and Smita Patil.

== Plot ==
This is the story of an orphan, Jassu, who was adopted by Inayat Mian. Jassu is in search of his lost brother, but he do not know that his loving brother Vikram became a notorious criminal.

== Cast ==
- Sanjeev Kumar as Jaswant Singh / Durjan Singh
- Smita Patil as Nisha
- Shakti Kapoor as Vikram Singh
- Amrish Puri as Bhoop Singh
- Om Prakash as Durjan's victim
- Jagdeep as Jaswant's Tutor
- Urmila Bhatt as Jaswant's Mother

== Music ==
The music for this film given by the famous duo of Shankar–Jaikishan with lyrics by Kafil Azar.

1. "Aiyo Na Maro Teer Ka Nishaana" - Kishore Kumar, Sharda
2. "Baato Me Na Taalo Ji..." - Mohammed Rafi, Asha Bhosle
3. "Bichhad Gaye Hai Kahin Na Unka Pata Milega" - Sharda
4. "Ari O Sakhi Bata Toh Sahi Tera Mehboob Kaisa Hai" - Dilraj Kaur, Anuradha Paudwal, Alka Yagnik, Chandrani Mukherjee
5. "Jalvon Ki Humare" - Anuradha Paudwal, Sharda
6. "Na Idher Ke Rahe Na Udher Rahe" - Suresh Wadkar, Sharda
