= Haqdaar =

- Promotional Poster
- Directed by: S.K.Luthra
- Written by: S.K.Luthra
- Produced by: S.K.Luthra
- Starring: Rakesh Roshan; Suresh Oberoi; Yogeeta Bali
- Music by: Kalyanji Anandji
- Release date: 18 September 1981
- Country: India
- Language: Hindi

Haqdaar (transl. Entitled) is a 1981 Indian Hindi-language film directed by S.K.Luthra, starring Rakesh Roshan, Suresh Oberoi and Yogeeta Bali.

== Cast ==
- Rakesh Roshan as Rakesh
- Suresh Oberoi as Suresh
- Yogeeta Bali as Yogeeta

== Soundtrack ==
Lyrics: Rajendra Krishan

Song	Singer
"Aaja Re Aaja Mere Pyar Ko Pyaas Pukare"	Asha Bhosle, Anwar
"O Deewane Jeena Hai To Jhoom Jhoomkar Jee Le"	Asha Bhosle, Amit Kumar
"Nayi Zindagi, Nayi Baharen, Din Albele Aaye"	Asha Bhosle, Manhar Udhas
"Hare Bhare Is Bagh Ki Hum Do Kaliyan Matwali"	Hemlata, Anuradha Paudwal
"Hum Jo Rehte The Kisi Dil Mein Tamanna Banke"	Hemlata
