= Suresh Oberoi =

Indian actor (born 1946)

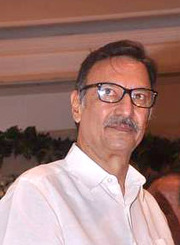
- Oberoi at Rajesh Khanna's prayer meet
- Born: 17 December 1946 (age 79); Quetta, Baluchistan Province, British India (present-day Balochistan, Pakistan)
- Occupations: Actor; television presenter; film producer; politician
- Years active: 1977–present
- Political party: Bharatiya Janata Party (2004–present)
- Spouse: Yashodhara (m. 1974)
- Children: 2; including Vivek Oberoi
- Family: Oberoi family

Suresh Oberoi (born 17 December 1946) is an Indian actor and politician who appeared in Hindi films. He is a recipient of the 1987 National Film Award for Best Supporting Actor. He started his career in radio shows, modelling and later moving to Bollywood, making him a popular character actor in the 1980s and much of the 1990s. He is the father of actor Vivek Oberoi.

== Early life ==
Oberoi was born to Anand Sarup Oberoi and Kartar Devi on 17 December 1946 in Quetta, then Baluchistan Province of British India. His father ran a real-estate business. Within a year, after the 1947 partition of India, the family along with four brothers and four sisters moved to India, and later relocated to Hyderabad where his family established a chain of medical stores. Oberoi was active in sports. He was a tennis and swimming champion, later winning the President's Award as a Boy Scout. After his father's death when he was just out of high school, Oberoi, along with his brother, continued running their pharmacy chain.

== Career ==
He has appeared in over 135 films. He recited a few couplets in the song "Dil Mein Phir Aaj Teri" with Anuradha Paudwal for the film Yaadon Ka Mausam (1990).

In 2004, he joined the Bharatiya Janata Party as a primary member.

=== Television ===
Oberoi has acted in the television shows Dhadkan and Kashmeer.

== Personal life ==
=== Family ===
He married Yashodara, 8 years younger than him, in Madras on 1 August 1974. The couple have a son, Bollywood actor Vivek Oberoi, born in 1976 and a daughter Meghna Oberoi born a few years later. His wife Yashodara is, as he said in a 2002 interview with Times of India, "from a Punjabi business family who had lived in the south."

His nephew, Akshay Oberoi is also a Bollywood actor.

=== Religion ===
Oberoi's father belonged to the Arya Samaj, a Hindu reformist organization, while his mother was a Nanakpanthi, and he considers himself to be religious, having written a spiritual book, Pilgrim of Life.

=== Poetry ===
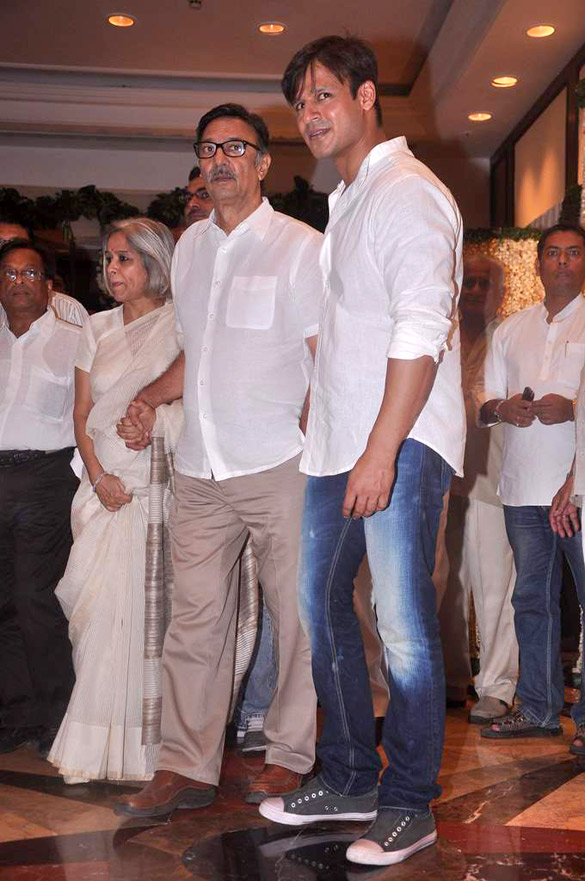
Yashodhara Oberoi, Suresh Oberoi, Vivek Oberoi at Rajesh Khanna's prayer meet

In addition to acting and singing, he writes "romantic and philosophical poetry".

=== World Psychiatric Association ===
Together with the speaker Brahma Kumaris Sister Shivani Verma, Oberoi is an ambassador of the World Psychiatric Association.

=== Politics ===
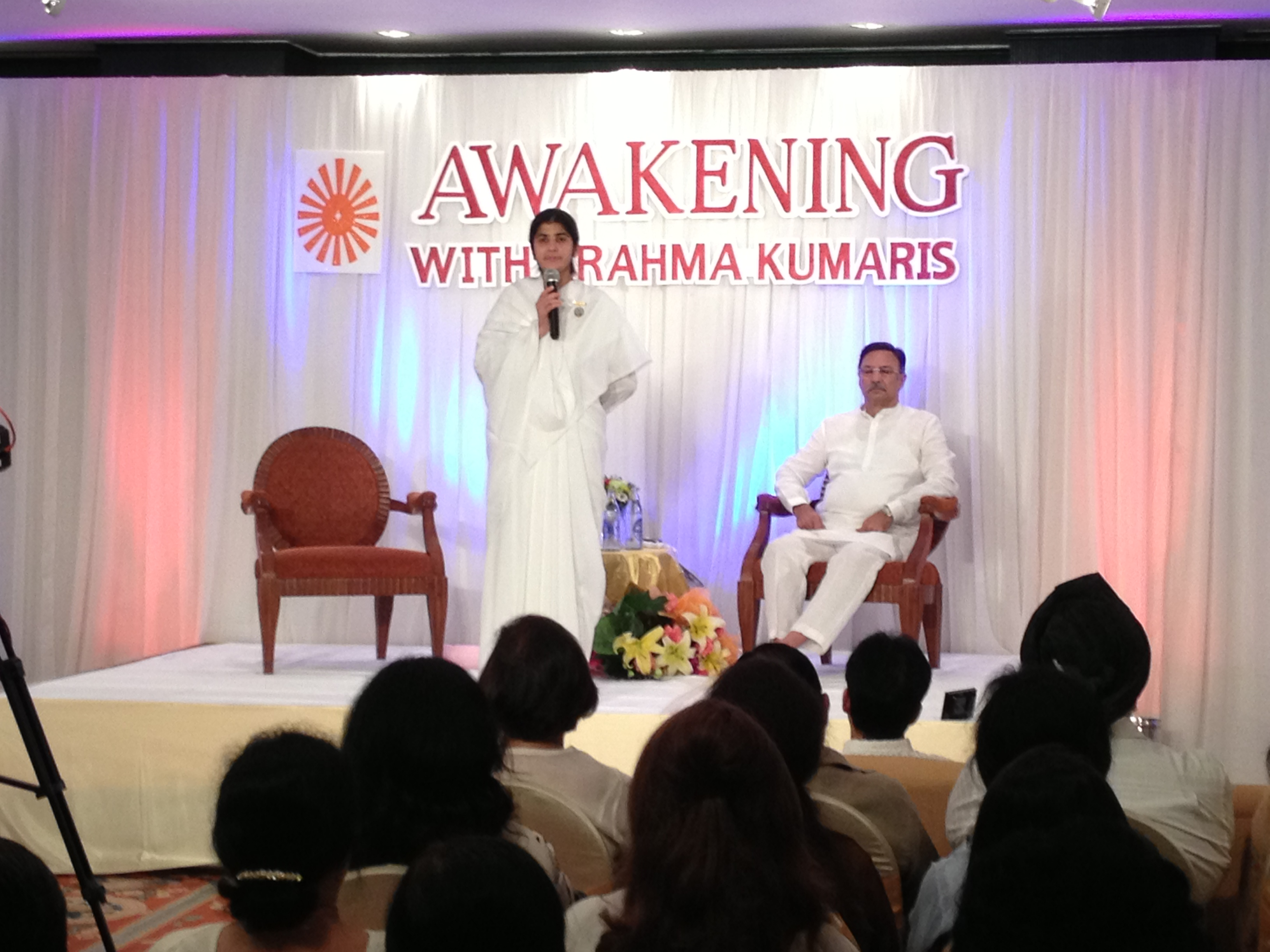
Oberoi with BK Sister Shivani Verma in Bangkok on the pay-to-broadcast television program Awakening with Brahma Kumaris

== Filmography ==
=== Films ===
Year	Film	Role	Notes
1977	Jeevan Mukt		
1978	Arvind Desai Ki Ajeeb Dastan		
1979	Surakshaa	Captain Kapoor	
1979	Kartavya	Forest Officer	
1979	Kala Patthar	Navy Officer	
1980	Pyaara Dushman		
1980	Phir Wohi Raat	Police Inspector	
1980	Morcha		
1980	Khanjar	Captain Usman	
1980	Ek Baar Phir	Mahender Kumar	
1980	Ek Baar Kaho		
1981	Shradhanjali	Laxmi Narayan	
1981	Saajan Ki Saheli	Suresh Oberoi	
1981	Raksha	Dr. Sinha	
1981	Naari		
1981	Main Aur Mera Haathi	Teja	
1981	Lawaaris	Ram Singh	Nominated 1982 Filmfare Best Supporting Actor Award
1981	Haqdaar		
1982	Vidhaata	Inspector Pratap Singh	
1982	Tumhare Bina	Robin Dutt	
1982	Teri Meri Kahani	Ajay Verma	TV film
1982	Taqdeer Ka Badshah		
1982	Patthar Ki Lakeer		
1982	Namak Halaal	Bhim Singh	
1982	Kaamchor	Suresh	
1982	Johny I Love You	Suraj Singh	
1982	Aagman		
1983	Ek Din Bahu Ka	Deepak	
1983	Rishta Kagaz Ka	Dr. Ravi Kaul	
1983	Mazdoor	Hiralal Sinha	
1983	Jeena Hai Pyar Mein		
1983	Hero		
1983	Ghungroo	Suraj	
1983	Coolie	Vicky Puri	
1984	Zindagi Jeene Ke Liye		
1984	Sharaabi	Abdul	
1984	Mujhe Shakti Do		
1984	Kanoon Kya Karega	Lawyer, Advocate Gautam Mehra	
1984	Grahasthi	Captain Deepak Verma	
1984	Ghar Ek Mandir		Nominated Filmfare Best Supporting Actor Award
1984	Gangvaa	Inspector	
1984	Ek Nai Paheli	Avinash	
1984	Ek Din Bahu Ka		
1984	Awaaz	Inspector Amit Gupta	
1984	Aagaman		
1985	Surkhiyaan	Shera	
1985	Ramkali	Inspector Dilip Singh	
1985	Raahi Badal Gaye	Dr. Mehra	
1985	Phul Debi	Bikram Malla	Bengali film
1985	Mirch Masala	Mukhi	1987 National Film Award for Best Supporting Actor; 1988 Bengal Film Journalists' Association – Best Supporting Actor Award
1985	Kahani Phoolvati Ki		
1985	Jawaab	Inspector J. S. Sharma	
1985	Grahasthi		
1985	Ek Daku Shaher Mein	Rakesh Pratap Singh	
1985	Dekha Pyar Tumhara	Inspector Ranjeet Mullick	
1985	Bepanah	Truck Driver	
1985	Aitbaar	Sagar	
1986	Zindagani	Sudarshan	Special appearance
1986	Triveni		
1986	Swarthi		
1986	Panchavati		
1986	Palay Khan	Dr. Ramkrishna Sinha	
1986	Mazloom	Vijay Singh	
1986	Main Balwan	Anil, Tony's Father	
1986	Jwala	Dr. Dev Dutt	
1986	Dilwaala	Madanlal Sharma	
1986	Bhai Ka Dushman Bhai		
1986	Amma		
1986	Aag Aur Shola	Aarti's mamaji	
1987	Wahem		
1987	Thikana	Police Inspector Ranbir Singh	
1987	Tera Karam Mera Dharam		
1987	Saat Saal Baad	Deepak Khanna	
1987	Naam O Nishan	Zorawar 'Zavar'	
1987	Itihaas	Kalicharan	
1987	Insaaf	Mr. Agnihotri	
1987	Dil Tujh Ko Diya	Ashok A. Sahni	
1987	Dacait	Amritlal Yadav	
1987	Kaal Chakra	Police Inspector Abhay Kamble	
1988	Tezaab	Inspector Gagan Singh	
1988	Shoorveer	Dr. S. Malhotra	
1988	Aakhri Muqabla		
1988	Mulzim	Ranjit Kumar	
1988	Mohabbat Ke Dushman	Abu Bhai	Special appearance
1988	Marana Mrudangam	Vasant Dada	Telugu film
1988	Bharatamlo Bala Chandrudu		Telugu film
1988	Khoon Baha Ganga Mein		
1988	Kaal Chakra		
1988	Dharam Yudh	Kundan	
1988	Bhai Ka Dushman Bhai		
1988	Akarshan	Himself	Special appearance
1989	Tujhe Nahin Chhodunga		
1989	Rakhwala	Ranjeet	
1989	Parinda	Abdul Khan	
1989	Mujrim	Police Inspector Gokhale	
1989	Manika, une vie plus tard	Rajit Sharma	French film
1989	Kasam Suhag Ki	Inspector Dildaar Dawood	
1989	Do Qaidi	Inspector Amar Sinha	
1989	Daata	Ramzan Khan	
1989	Apna Desh Paraye Log		
1989	Andhergardi		
1989	Aakhri Muqabla	Bajranj	
1990	Sailaab	Police Inspector Ranjit Kapoor	
1990	Panchavati		
1990	Kali Ganga		
1990	Halaat		
1990	C.I.D.	Major Brijmohan Verma	
1990	Aaj Ka Arjun	Mohan	
1991	Sadhu Sant		
1991	Pucca Badmash	Salim Dandewala	
1991	Pyar Ka Devta	Inspector Arun	
1991	Numbri Aadmi	ACP Vijay Pratap	
1991	Kasam Kali Ki		
1991	Jeene Ki Sazaa	Dr. Santosh	
1991	Jaan Ki Kasam	Kumar	
1991	Iraada		
1991	Inspector Dhanush	Com. Avinash	
1991	Fateh	Major Anand	
1991	Deshwasi	Pratap Singh	
1991	Dastoor		
1992	Abhi Abhi	Vishwanath	
1992	Zindagi Ek Juaa	CBI Officer Suresh Chandra Bhatnagar	
1992	Tirangaa	Rudrapratap Chouhan	
1992	Kis Mein Kitna Hai Dum	Shamsher Singh	
1992	Indira		
1992	Dil Ka Kya Kasoor	Rajesh Saxena	
1992	Apradhi	Satyaprakash V. Nath	
1992	Abhi Abhi		
1993	Santaan	Judge Sahab	
1993	Pratimurti		
1993	Pardesi		
1993	Khoon Ka Sindoor		
1993	Gardish	Inspector Saini	
1993	Game	Inspector Pawar	
1993	Dhartiputra		
1993	Bhookamp		
1993	Anari	Bhai Raja Vikram Singh, Nandini's eldest brother	
1993	Aasoo Bane Angaarey		
1994	Vijaypath	Inspector Rajesh Saxena	
1994	Suhaag	Rai Bahadur	
1994	Kranti Kshetra		
1994	Gopi Kishan	Rajeshwar Choudhary	
1994	Dilbar	DCP Sridhar Atmaram Verma	
1995	Suraksha		
1995	Raghuveer	Ravi Varma, Commando	
1995	Meri Mohabbat Mera Naseeba		
1995	Kismat	ACP Anand	
1995	Jai Vikranta	Raja	
1995	Diya Aur Toofan	Dr. Vijay Mehra	
1995	Dilbar	DCP Sridhar Atmaram Verma	
1995	Anokhi Chal		
1996	Raja Hindustani	Bakshrath Sehgal	
1996	Masoom	Vikram Singh	
1996	Jaan	Vishambar	
1996	Ajay	Raja Brijraj Singh	
1997	Suraj	Police Commissioner Ramakant	
1997	Prithvi	Dhanraj	
1997	Kaun Sachcha Kaun Jhutha♧	IG Suryakant Verma	
1997	Lahu Ke Do Rang	Dharma Shikari	
1998	Surviving Sabu	Sadru	Short film
1998	Soldier	Pratap Singh	
1998	Puraido: Unmei no toki	Justice, Dr. Radhabinod Pal	Japanese film
1998	Khote Sikkey	Pukhraj Mahadevan	
1998	Aakrosh: Cyclone Of Anger	Mahendra Pratap Gujral/Suraj Singh	
1998	2001: Do Hazaar Ek	Mr. Amirchand	
1999	Sautela		
1999	Safari	Mr. Ajit Aggarwal, Anjali's father	
2000	Khauff	Mr. Singhania	
2001	Shirdi Sai Baba		
2001	Pyaar Tune Kya Kiya	Mr. Jaiswal, Ria's Father	
2001	Moksha: Salvation	Mr. Sehgal, Vikram's father	
2001	Lajja	Raghuveer's father	
2001	Kaala Mandir		
2001	Hum Ho Gaye Aapke	Mr. Oberoi, Rishi's father	
2001	Gadar: Ek Prem Katha	Kulwant Singh, Tara Singh's uncle	
2001	Dal: The Gang	Bhaktavar Singh/Major Balwant Sahni	
2001	Asoka		Narrator
2002	Raat Ke Saudagar		
2002	Deewangee	Mr. Bhullar, Public Prosecutor	
2002	23rd March 1931: Shaheed	Gaoler Chaddha	
2003	Yeh Dil		
2003	Talaash: The Hunt Begins...	Babu, Arjun's Father	
2005	Socha Na Tha	Nirmal Oberoi	
2009	World Cupp 2011	Coach	
2009	Karma Aur Holi	Shekhar	
2013	Attahasa	Rajkumar	Kannada film
2019	Kabir Singh	Rajdheer Singh	
2019	Manikarnika: The Queen of Jhansi	Peshwa Bajirao II	
2019	PM Narendra Modi	Swami Dayanand Giri	Narrator
2023	Sangharsh 2	Narrator	Bhojpuri film starring Khesari Lal Yadav
2023	Animal	Rajdheer Dodamal Singh (Dadaji)	
2026	Azad Bharath	Chhaju Ramji	
2026	Khalifa	Seth	Malayalam film

=== Dubbing roles ===
==== Live action films ====
Film title	Actor	Character	Dub Language	Original Language	Original Year release	Dub Year release	Notes
The Mummy	Arnold Vosloo	Imhotep	Hindi	English; Arabic; Ancient Egyptian	1999		
The Mummy Returns	Arnold Vosloo	Imhotep	Hindi	English; Arabic; Ancient Egyptian	2001		

==== Animated films ====
Film title	Original voice	Character	Dub Language	Original Language	Original Year Release	Dub Year Release	Notes
The Lion King	James Earl Jones	Mufasa	Hindi	English	1994	1995	

== Awards and nominations ==
Year	Award	Film	Category	Result	Ref.
1982	Filmfare Awards	Lawaris	Best Supporting Actor	Nominated	
1985	Filmfare Awards	Ghar Ek Mandir	Best Supporting Actor	Nominated	
1987	National Film Awards	Mirch Masala	Best Supporting Actor	Won	
1988	Bengal Film Journalists' Association Awards	Mirch Masala	Best Supporting Actor (Hindi)	Won	

- Champions of Change Award in 2019, for his work in culture. The award was conferred by Shri Pranab Mukherjee at Vigyan Bhavan New Delhi on 20 January 2020.
