= Badalte Rishtey =

1978 film

- Movie Poster
- Directed by: R. Jhalani
- Written by: Madan Joshi (dialogues); Anjaan (lyrics)
- Screenplay by: Phani Majumdar
- Story by: Mahendra Saral
- Produced by: Sudesh Kumar
- Starring: Jeetendra; Rishi Kapoor; Reena Roy
- Narrated by: Govindram Ahuja
- Cinematography: Pravin Bhatt
- Edited by: B. Prasad
- Music by: Laxmikant–Pyarelal
- Production company: Vijayashree Pictures
- Distributed by: Ultra Distributors (2006, India, Video)
- Release date: 3 November 1978
- Running time: 136 mins
- Country: India
- Language: Hindi

Badalte Rishtey (transl. Changing Relations) is a 1978 Bollywood drama film, produced by Sudesh Kumar under the Vijayashree Pictures banner and directed by R. Jhalani. It stars Jeetendra, Rishi Kapoor, Reena Roy and music by Laxmikant Pyarelal.

== Plot ==
Savitri (Reena Roy), a music teacher with a school, also takes music tutorials for girls by going to their homes. Savitri lives with her brother, Chandar (Asrani), who is a painting contractor, and his mother. She meets Manohar Dhani (Rishi Kapoor), a guide by profession, who falls for her at the first meeting. He follows her to her home on the pretext of selling her eggs. Savitri knows fully aware that Manohar is just trying to woo her and is not an egg seller. Sagar (Jeetendra), is a US returned businessman whose kid sister is a student of Savitri. On his return from the US, he happens to hear Savitri's song and immediately falls for her as well.

Savitri's friend, who is also her brother's fiancée, comes in with her father (A. K. Hangal), an astrology expert. He predicts that some good times are waiting for Chandar, but he also predicts a bad phase for his mother. However, he refuses to share any details about Savitri. In the meantime, Savitri is falling for Manohar and both romance.

Sagar helps Chandar on account of an old friendship and also nurses a plan to marry Savitri. He writes her a letter offering to be her student with the tone of the letter clearly showing his intentions. Savitri fumes at the letter and complains to Sagar's sister-in-law, who in turn describes Sagar's plan to marry her and also lists this as a reason to help her brother. Sagar's family visits Savitri's home and the sister-in-law proposes Savitri's marriage to Sagar. Savitri refuses the proposal and on hearing this, her mother falls unconscious. Manohar meets with an accident and is taken to the hospital. In the meantime, Savitri ends up marrying Sagar at the insistence of her critically ill-mother. On the day of her marriage, her friend tells her about A. K. Hangal's prediction, that the man she marries would die within 40 days.

Savitri tells Sagar about this but he is ready to take this risk and wants to marry her anyway. After marriage, Savitri writes to Manohar about the events. Manohar meets Savitri at her brother's wedding and offers to kill her husband, suggesting that he is going to die anyway in 40 days. Savitri saves Sagar and asks Manohar to stay out of this and thus begins her hate for Manohar. Meanwhile, Manohar befriends Sagar and enters their house, telling Savitri that he would have access to kill Sagar at any time. Savitri strongly disagrees and she wants him to go away.

Finally, Savitri tells Sagar of Manohar's intentions and he confronts Manohar. When Manohar tries to kill Sagar with a pistol, Savitri saves Sagar and drives Manohar away. Thus, Sagar and Savitri start living together happily. While going away, Manohar meets Savitri's brother and tells him that the relationship has changed. Chandar explains to his wife that Manohar was intentionally behaving in a cruel way so that Savitri would unite with Sagar.

== Cast ==
- Jeetendra as Sagar Singh
- Rishi Kapoor as Manohar Dhani
- Reena Roy as Savitri Thakur
- Asrani as Anup Chandra Thakur
- Dina Pathak as Mrs. Thakur
- Pinchoo Kapoor as Colonel
- A. K. Hangal as Professor
- Urmila Bhatt as Mrs. Raghuvir Singh
- Shubha Khote as Urmila Bipin Singh
- Raju Shrestha as Kishan Singh
- Rachana Bhatt as Prema Singh
- Shashi Bala Saxena as Champa

== Soundtrack ==
Song	Singer Lyrics By – Anjaan
"Gumsum Si Khoi Khoi, Jaise Ho Boot Koi"	Kishore Kumar, Anuradha Paudwal
"Tum Chahe Humko Pasand Na Karo, Par Tum Humko Pasand Ho"	Kishore Kumar, Suman Kalyanpur
"Na Jaane Kaise, Pal Mein Badal Jaate Hai Yeh Duniya Ke Badalte Rishte"	Kishore Kumar, Suman Kalyanpur, Mohammed Rafi
"Meri Saanson Ko Jo Mehka Rahi Hai"	Lata Mangeshkar, Mahendra Kapoor
"Woh Woh Na Rahe, Jinke Liye Hum The Bekaraar"	Mohammed Rafi

== Awards ==
Year	Nominee / work	Award	Result
1979	B. Prasad	Filmfare Best Editing Award	Won
