= Zindagi Ek Juaa =

- Poster
- Directed by: Prakash Mehra
- Written by: Prakash Mehra; Dr. Rahi Masoom Reza (dialogues)
- Screenplay by: Satish Bhatnagar
- Produced by: Prakash Mehra
- Starring: Anil Kapoor; Madhuri Dixit; Shakti Kapoor; Suresh Oberoi; Anupam Kher; Amrish Puri
- Music by: Bappi Lahiri
- Release date: 15 May 1992
- Running time: 184 mins
- Country: India
- Language: Hindi

Zindagi Ek Juaa (transl. Life is a Gamble) is a 1992 Hindi tragedy drama film directed and produced by Prakash Mehra. It stars Anil Kapoor, Madhuri Dixit, Shakti Kapoor, Suresh Oberoi, Anupam Kher, Amrish Puri in pivotal roles. The music was composed by Bappi Lahiri.

== Plot ==
After saving the life of his employer, Jagjeet Singh, alias J.J., Harikishan, alias Hariya is promoted with a wage increase that he had only dreamt of. Anxious to please his employer, Hariya agrees to have his name changed to Harry and does anything that he is instructed to do. Soon Harry realises that he has been aiding his employer in illegal activities. When he tries to break away, he is told that his mother and sister are and will be held captive to guarantee his cooperation. Harry must now come up with a scheme that will guarantee his safety as well as the freedom of his mother and sister, and at the same time save himself from being arrested by the police.

== Cast ==
- Anil Kapoor as Harikishan "Hariya" / Harry
- Madhuri Dixit as Juhi
- Shakti Kapoor as Shakti
- Suresh Oberoi as CBI Officer Suresh Chandra Bhatnagar
- Anupam Kher as Jagjeet Singh "J.J."
- Amrish Puri as Bhalla
- Mangal Dhillon as Mangal
- Anant Jog as Lobo
- Roma Manek as Dancer in Shakti Dancing Group
- Asha Sharma as Harikishan's Mother

== Soundtrack ==
Song	Singer
"Na Ja Re Na Ja Pardes"	Asha Bhosle
"Yeh Zindagi Hai Ek Juaa"	Asha Bhosle
"Dil To Dil Hai, Dil Ka Kya Hai"	Asha Bhosle
"Dil To Dil Hai, Dil Ka Kya Hai"	Kumar Sanu
"Yeh Zindagi Hai Ek Juaa"	Kumar Sanu
"Yun Ghur Ghurke"	Kumar Sanu
"Kabhi Kuch Khoya"	Kumar Sanu
