= Anjaan (lyricist) =

Indian author and film song lyricist (1930–1997)

- Born: Lalji Pandey; 28 October 1930; Benares, Benares State, British India (Present-day Varanasi, Uttar Pradesh, India)
- Died: 3 September 1997 (aged 66); Mumbai, Maharashtra, India
- Occupation: Lyricist
- Children: 3; including Sameer

Lalji Pandey (28 October 1930 – 3 September 1997), better known by the pen name of Anjaan, was an Indian lyricist known for his work in Hindi language films. Having penned over 1,500 songs for more than 300 films, he is remembered for tracks from his frequent collaborations with composers Kalyanji–Anandji, Laxmikant-Pyarelal, R. D. Burman and Bappi Lahiri. Lyricist Sameer is his son.

== Initial days in Hindi films ==
Anjaan had got his first break with the 1953 Prem Nath production Prisoner of Golconda where he wrote "Lehar Yeh Dole Koyal Bole" and "Shaheedon Amar Hai Tumhari Kahani".

After this he remained fairly busy, but in small films. His only popular number was "Mat Poonch Mera Hai Mera Kaun Watan" (Lambe Haath) with music by G. S. Kohli, with whom he did many small films. He was first noticed for his work with the Raaj Kumar film Godaan, based on the Premchand classic, with music by Ravi Shankar. This film got him a few good assignments in the mid-1960s with big composers like O. P. Nayyar ("Aap Ke Haseen Rukh") in Guru Dutt's Baharen Phir Bhi Aayengi and G. P. Sippy's Bandhan, which established him commercially with "Bina Badraa Ke Bijuriya Kaise Barse". This also saw the forging with fellow lyricist Indeevar and composers Kalyanji-Anandji. This was followed by songs in Kalyanji - Anandji's Kab? Kyon? Aur Kahan?. Shankar - Jaikishan's Umang, Rivaaj and Ek Nari Ek Brahmachari, Ravi's Vandana ("Aap Ki Inaayat Aap Ke Karam"), R. D. Burman's Hungama ('Wah Ri Kismat', 'Suraj Se Jo Kiran Ka Naata' which was the first ever song filmed on Zeenat Aman) and a few other films.

And yet it took Anjaan many more years before he emerged as a prolific writer who amalgamated many of his commercial songs with lyricism and poetry. Some of his strongest work came in Amitabh Bachchan films scored by Kalyanji Anandji, beginning with Do Anjaane ("Luk Chhip Luk Chhip Jao Na") in 1976.

Followed Hera Pheri ("Barson Purana Yeh Yaarana"), Khoon Pasina ("Title Song" and "Bani Rahe Jodi Raja Rani Ki"), Muqaddar Ka Sikandar ("Rote Hue Aate Hain Sab", "O Saathi Re", "Pyar Zindagi Hai", "Dil To Hai Dil"), Don with his biggest hit of the career "Khaike Paan Banaras Wala", ("Ee Hai Bambai Nagariya", "Jiska Mujhe Tha Intezaar"), Lawaaris ("Jiska Koi Nahin", "Kab Ke Bichhde") and Jaadugar. He also wrote hits for Bachchan with other composers like Rajesh Roshan (Do Aur Do Paanch, Yaarana), Bappi Lahiri (Namak Halaal, Sharaabi) and R. D. Burman (Mahaan). His liaison with Prakash Mehra also yielded hits like Zindagi Ek Juaa, Dalaal and other films like Jwalamukhi, Ghunghroo, Mohabbat Ke Dushman, Muqaddar Ka Faisla, Imaandaar, Chameli Ki Shaadi and Himalay Se Ooncha.

== Career in the 1980s and afterwards ==
In the 1980s, he even emerged as the writers of choice for Mithun Chakravarty's films like Disco Dancer and Dance Dance and struck a gold mine in the films of Bappi Lahiri, Shibu Mitra and B. Subhash. Among his hits with them were the songs of Aandhi Toofan, Ilzaam, Aag Hi Aag, Paap Ki Duniya and Tarzan.

His work with others was almost schizophrenically different, with songs like R. D. Burman's "Yeh Faasle Yeh Duriyan" (Zameen Aasman), "Laagi Lag Jaaye Logon" (Poonam / Anu Malik), "Ganga Mein Dooba" (Apne Rang Hazaar), ‘Meri Saanson Ko Jo’, "Na Jaane Kaise" and "Woh Woh Na Rahe" (Badaltey Rishtey, "Hamrahi Mere Humrahi" (Do Dilon Ki Daastaan), ‘Yashoda Ka Nandlala (Sanjog), ‘Sadiyan Beet Gayi’ (Triveni) and the beautiful songs of Eeshwar (all these films were with Laxmikant–Pyarelal showing a poetic vein). Another major hit was Anu Malik's breakthrough film Ek Jaan Hain Hum.

His health suffered a major setback in the early 1990s, though he delivered hits with Zindagi Ek Juaa, Dalaal, Ghayal and the 1990 chartbuster "Gori Hain Kalaiyan" (Aaj Ka Arjun) and his last hit Shola Aur Shabnam (1992). His other films in the 1990s included Vishnu Devaa, Parakrami, Insaniyat, Police Aur Mujrim, First Love Letter, Aandhiyaan, Phool Bane Angaarey and others.

In the 1960s, Anjaan also wrote several non-films albums composed by Shyam Sagar and sung by Mohammad Rafi, Manna Dey and Suman Kalyanpur. Rafi's song "Main Kab Gaata" was a big hit then. Anjaan also entered the world of Bhojpuri films with the massive hit Balam Pardesia in the late 1970s. The song "Gourki Patarki Re" became a rage and set the stage for many more films with a resurgent Chitragupta and laying the foundation for the personal - and later - professional liaison between their respective sons Sameer and Anand–Milind.

Anjaan was a very successful all-rounder for almost 20 years in Hindi films, but his poetry still had the colour of Bhojpuri language and the ethos and culture of Uttar Pradesh, the citadel of Hindi. This is why, says Sameer, he could write "Khaike Paan", "Bina Badra Ke Bijuriya" and similar songs with great skill. His own favourites were his songs from Apne Rang Hazaar and Badaltey Rishtey and "Maano To Main Ganga Maa Hoon Maano To Behta Paani" and "Chal Musafir" from Ganga Ki Saugandh. A few months before his death on 13 September 1997, his only book of poems, Ganga Tath Ka Banjara (A Gypsy from the Shores of the Ganges) was released at the hands of Amitabh Bachchan.

== Filmography as lyricist ==
Year	Film	Notes
1963	Godaan	
1966	Baharen Phir Bhi Aayengi	
1971	Hungama	
1978	Priyatama (1977film)	
1978	Don	
1978	Muqaddar Ka Sikander	
1978	Badalte Rishtey	
1980	Jwalamukhi	
1981	Lawaaris (1981 film)	
1982	Disco Dancer	
1982	Namak Halal	
1984	Sharaabi	
1984	Zameen Aasmaan	
1985	Do Dilon Ki Daastan	
1986	Sultanat	
1989	Saaya	
1990	Naakabandi	
1992	Shola Aur Shabnam	

== Notable songs ==
- "Pyaar kisi ka gaata hai" (singer: Mohammed Rafi)
- "Aapke haseen rukh pe aaj nayaa" – Baharein Phir Bhi Aayengi (singer: Mohammed Rafi)
- "Khaike Paan Banaras Waala" – Don (singer: Kishore Kumar)
- "Dil To Hai Dil" – Muqaddar Ka Sikandar
- "Rote Huye Aate Hain Sab" – Muqaddar Ka Sikandar (singer: Kishore Kumar)
- "O Saathee Re Tere Bina Bhi Kya Jina" – Muqaddar Ka Sikandar (singer: Kishore Kumar)
- "Pyaar Zindagi Hai" – Muqaddar Ka Sikandar
- "Log Kehte Hain Maein Sharaabi Hoon" – Sharabhi (singer: Kishore Kumar)
- "Tere Jaisa Yaar Kahan" – Yaarana (singer: Kishore Kumar)
- "Chhookar Mere Man Ko Kiya Toone Kya Ishaara" – Yaarana (singer: Kishore Kumar)
