= Amrit (1986 film) =

1986 film by Mohan Kumar

- Theatrical release poster
- Directed by: Mohan Kumar
- Written by: V K Sharma
- Story by: Mohan Kumar
- Produced by: Mohan Kumar
- Starring: Rajesh Khanna; Smita Patil; Aruna Irani; Shafi Inamdar; Satish Shah; Zarina Wahab; Mukri; Sujit Kumar; Daljit Kaur
- Cinematography: V. K. Murthy
- Music by: Laxmikant Pyarelal; Anand Bakshi (Lyrics)
- Production company: Emkay Films
- Release date: 27 June 1986
- Running time: 190 minutes
- Country: India
- Language: Hindi

Amrit is a 1986 Indian Hindi drama film starring Rajesh Khanna in the title role playing the character of Amritlal Sharma. The film was directed by Mohan Kumar immediately after directing Avtaar with Khanna in the title role and lyrics written by Anand Bakshi. This movie gave Rajesh Khanna his fourth BJFA Best Actor award in 1987. The film was critically acclaimed and received five stars in Bollywood Guide Collections. The film was remade in Telugu as Aatma Bandhuvulu.

== Synopsis ==
Amrit (Rajesh Khanna) stays with his only son and meanwhile Kamla (Smita Patil) a widow stays with her only son at Kamal Niwas. But Kamla is treated as a servant in her own house and the only person who loves her in the house is her granddaughter Sunita. Amrit has the habit of taking his grandson to the nearby garden when his grandson is free from studies. Amrit learns about Kamla's problems due to his meeting her coincidentally quite regularly in the garden. Amrit and Kamla meet up to develop a good relationship. One fine day Kamla gets late to pick up her granddaughter Sunita from the school, as the auto rickshaw she was travelling in to reach school, meets with an accident. Amrit, meanwhile goes to pick up his grandson Rahul, learns of this and brings Sunita to her house. Amrit sees Kamla being humiliated by her daughter-in-law when he goes to their house to nurse Kamla's injury. Amrit decides to donate some money to Brahmins on the occasion of his son's birthday but he does not have money and so asks his son to give him a few bucks. Amrit and Kamla watch TV with Sunita and Rahul, upon this Amrit's son gets angry and humiliates them, his son throws him out of the house permanently. In the torrential rains, the hurt Amrit meets with an accident. Kamla, then with help of like minded people, has Amrit admitted in a hospital. The rest of the story is about how Amrit and Kamla decide to separate from their respective selfish children and spend the rest part of life together and how society perceives their togetherness.

== Reception ==
The film had collections worth gross of 9.3 crores at the box office in 1986 in India. It received five stars in the Bollywood guide Collections. The movie was a super hit and celebrated silver jubilee at many centers.

== Cast ==
- Rajesh Khanna as Amritlal "Amrit" Sharma
- Smita Patil as Kamla Srivastav
- Aruna Irani as Hasina Banu Ali
- Shafi Inamdar as Advocate Sharafat Ali
- Pallavi Joshi as Sunita Srivastav
- Shashi Puri as Shrikant Srivastav
- Rajesh Puri as Baldev Srivastav, the brother-in-law of Virendra Srivastav
- Satish Shah as Ramcharan Yadav
- Sujit Kumar as Doctor Vikas
- Mukri as Kamru, Vegetable Vendor
- Zarina Wahab as Savitri Srivastav
- Rishabh Shukla as Virendra Srivastav
- Anita Kanwar as Rekha Srivastav
- Yunus Parvez as Judge Saxena
- Mumtaz Begum as Mausi Pushpa (uncredited)
- Shivraj as Fakir (in the song "Duniya Mein Kitna Gham Hai")
- Birbal as Chajuram, Dhaba owner

== Music ==
All lyrics are written by Anand Bakshi; all music is composed by Laxmikant–Pyarelal.

No.	Title	Singer(s)	Length
1.	"Zindagi Kya Hai Ik Lateefa Hai"	Kishore Kumar and chorus
2.	"Jeevan Sathi Saath Mein Rahna"	Manhar Udhas, Anuradha Paudwal
3.	"Sharafat Ali Ko Sharafat Ne Mara"	Kavita Krishnamurthy, Mohammad Aziz, Jaspal Singh, Mahendra Kapoor
4.	"Duniya Mein Kitna Gham Hai (Duet)"	Mohammad Aziz, Anuradha Paudwal
5.	"Duniya Mein Kitna Gham Hai (male)"	Mohammad Aziz
6.	"Duniya Mein Kitna Gham Hai (female)"	Anuradha Paudwal
