= Anokha Rishta =

1986 film by I. V. Sasi

- Promotional poster designed by P. N. Menon
- Directed by: I.V. Sasi
- Written by: Rahi Masoom Raza
- Story by: P. Padmarajan
- Produced by: Raju Mathew
- Starring: Rajesh Khanna; Smita Patil; Tanuja; Shafi Inamdar; Satish Shah; Karan Shah; Beena Banerjee; Sabeeha
- Music by: Songs: R. D. Burman; Background score: Shyam
- Release date: 29 August 1986
- Country: India
- Language: Hindi

Anokha Rishta is a 1986 Indian Hindi film, directed by I.V. Sasi, written by Rahi Masoom Raza, and starring Rajesh Khanna, supported by Smita Patil, Sabeeha, Tanuja, Shafi Inamdar, Satish Shah and Karan Shah. A remake of the director's own 1984 Malayalam film Kanamarayathu starring Mammootty, the story revolves around the three characters played by Rajesh Khanna, Smita Patil and Sabeeha. The original film was written by P. Padmarajan and was loosely based on Jean Webster's 1919 novel Daddy-Long-Legs. Anokha Rishta was the debut of Sabeeha, the daughter of actress Ameeta.

== Synopsis ==
Anokha Rishta is the story of an unusual relationship between Mary and Robert Brown. Mary is a 19-year-old orphan who lives in an orphanage run by nuns. She scores 92.5% in her last year of school and is artistically talented. Her school education was being sponsored by a philanthropist. When he passes away, Mother Superior meets with the old man's son Robert 'Bob' Brown and requests him to continue supporting Mary's college education.

Bob, who is now at the helm of his father's business, agrees after consulting his father's trusted aid Nasir Khan. Bob insists that Mary not be told of her sponsor's death so she continues to write him letters and Bob can fulfill her wishes. Bob does not know what Mary looks, like but keeps receiving letters from Mary asking for new dresses and accessories and such. Mother Superior advises Mary not tell any one that she is an orphan when she is in her city college and hostel and instead say that her parents live in Dubai. Bob is a good looking bachelor, who is a rich businessman, aged above 40. On meeting him with her college friend Sweety, Mary ends up falling in love with Bob without knowing he is her sponsor and "her uncle", to whom she writes letters regularly.

Bill is a young man working for Bob. Bill finds out that Bob was in love with Dr. Padma, but the couple decided to remain unmarried as they did not want to go against their respective fathers' wishes. At Sweety's birthday party, Bob notices Mary wearing the dress and accessories he had sent the girl in the orphanage, but does not read too much into this since he thinks she is from Dubai. Bill falls in love with Mary but she rejects Bill. After numerous attempts to impress Mary fail, Bill decides to take his work more seriously and starts working more sincerely. Mary, being madly in love with Bob keeps on living in her dreamy world of a married life with him. She refrains from sharing her feelings and mental agony (of not getting a positive response from Bob) with "her uncle" since all incoming and outgoing mail is first screened by Mother Superior.

Bill gets tips from Bob on how to win a young girl's heart. Bill tells Bob that he is in love with Mary. Bill's brother Alex asks Bob to help unite Bill and Mary. Bob organizes a picnic but Bill does not turn up there as he is angry with Mary. Mary who has come to the picnic only to spend time with Bob proposes to him. Bob points out that had he got married at the right age he would have a daughter of Mary's age. Bill tells Mary that Bob was in love with Dr. Padma, but the couple decided to remain unmarried as they did not want to go against the wishes of their respective families. Mary is extremely frustrated and in a fit of rage lies to Padma that she is pregnant with Bob's child. Padma is shocked and scolds Bob for his irresponsibility. Bob calls Mary to his office and shouts at her thinking that she is pregnant with Bill's baby and has lied to the doctor but she tells him that she was trying to prove her love for him.

Mary decides to become a nun because of her love disappointment. Dr. Padma tries to stop Mary but she remains firm in her decision. She writes a final letter to "her uncle" with a special request to the head of the orphanage to deliver it to him without opening it or reading its contents. Padma advises Bob to marry Mary and prevent Mary from taking this drastic step. Mary meets Bill and tells him tells him that she is in love with Bob and since he did not accept her, she has decided to become a nun. Bill has a fight with Bob over this. As Mary is about to leave the orphanage, Bob comes in and reveals that he was the unseen sponsor (her uncle) and asks her to marry Bill.

== Cast ==
- Rajesh Khanna as Robert Bob
- Smita Patil as Dr. Miss Padma Kapoor
- Sabeeha as Mary
- Shafi Inamdar as Alex
- Tanuja as Mother Superior
- Karan Shah as Bill
- Beena Banerjee as Alex's Wife
- Satish Shah as Nasir Khan
- Sukumari as Robert's mother

== Music ==
Lyrics: Anand Bakshi

#	Song	Singer
1	"Aaj Ka Din Na Jaane Kyun"	Asha Bhosle
2	"Chal Saheli Jhoomke"	Asha Bhosle
3	"Tune Yeh Jaana"	Asha Bhosle
4	"Mary, Tu Meri Ho Jaa"	Amit Kumar
