= Charandas Chor =

1975 film

- Movie poster
- Directed by: Shyam Benegal
- Written by: Shyam Benegal; Shama Zaidi (Screen Adaptation)
- Story by: Vijaydan Detha
- Based on: Rajasthani folk tale by Vijaydan Detha
- Produced by: Children's Film Society of India
- Starring: Smita Patil, Lalu Ram, Sunder
- Music by: Nand Kishore Mittal
- Release date: 1975
- Running time: 156 min
- Country: India
- Language: Hindi

Charandas Chor (Charandas the Thief) is a 1975 children's film by noted director Shyam Benegal, based on the famous play by Habib Tanvir, which itself was an adaptation of a classical Rajasthani folktale by Vijaydan Detha. The lyrics of the film were also by Habib Tanvir.

The film starred Smita Patil, Lalu Ram, Madanlal and Habib Tanvir. The film is the start of Patil's career in cinema.

== Plot ==
Based on a classic folk tale originally narrated by Vijaydan Detha and adapted as a folk play by Habib Tanvir, the film follows the tumultuous life of Charandas (Lalu Ram), a petty thief who nevertheless adheres to a strict moral code, valuing honesty, integrity and professional efficiency. He makes four vows to his guru: never to eat from a gold plate, lead a procession in his own honour, become a king or marry a princess, believing these possibilities to be beyond his reach. His guru later adds a fifth vow: never to tell a lie.

Charandas sets out on his life's journey, which eventually leads him to a kingdom where a series of events makes him famous. Despite his lowly origins, he is offered political power and the opportunity to become king, but refuses in accordance with his vows. The local princess (Smita Patil) subsequently becomes enchanted by him and proposes marriage. Charandas rejects her as well, remaining faithful to his principles, but his refusal costs him his life.

As Charandas is put to death, the film exposes the inherent paradoxes of human existence, suggesting that a truthful life may be impossible to sustain, even for those who remain committed to honesty or become truthful by circumstance.

== Cast ==
- Lalu Ram as Charandas
- Smita Patil as Princess Kelavati
- Madanlal as Buddhu
- Fida Bai as Dancer
- Malabai as woman wearing jewellery
- Sadhu Meher as Chitragupt
- Thakur Das as Yamraj
- Habib Tanvir as Magistrate
- Tahir Khan as lawyer
- Ram Narayan Lahare as Mantri
- Anjali Paigankar as Dasi of princess
- Sunder
- Babu das as Hawaldar
- Bhaklaram as Sipahi 1
- Ramnath as Sipahi 2
- Thakur ram as Sadhu (Guruji)
- Ram Ratan as Mandir Pujari
- Hira Ram as Zamindar
- Amarsingh Lahare as poor farmer
- Ram Charan as Sahukar
- Uday Ram as Jeweller
- Saifuddin as driver
- Govind Nirmalkar as Munim
- Babu
- Kemal Kar
