= Namak Halaal =

1982 Indian film by Prakash Mehra

- Film poster
- Directed by: Prakash Mehra
- Written by: Surendra Kaul (story); Laxmikant Sharma (screenplay); Kader Khan (dialogue)
- Produced by: Satyendra Pal
- Starring: Shashi Kapoor; Amitabh Bachchan; Smita Patil; Parveen Babi; Waheeda Rehman; Om Prakash; Ranjeet
- Cinematography: N. Satyen
- Edited by: Jayant Adhikari
- Music by: Bappi Lahiri
- Distributed by: Chaudary Enterprises; Prakash Mehra Productions
- Release date: 30 April 1982
- Running time: 172 mins
- Country: India
- Language: Hindi
- Box office: ₹120 million

Namak Halaal (transl. Loyal Servant) is a 1982 Indian Hindi-language masala film, directed by Prakash Mehra and written by Kader Khan. The film stars Shashi Kapoor, Amitabh Bachchan, Smita Patil, Parveen Babi and Waheeda Rehman.

Prakash Mehra initially approached Rajesh Khanna alongside Bachchan for the role of Shashi Kapoor as the both stars has done a similar film Namak Haraam but due to rivalry with Amitabh Bachchan he refused the role.

The film went on to be the third highest-grossing Indian film of 1982, grossing ₹120 million (US$12.64 million). It is the biggest comedy blockbuster of all time in India, where it sold more than 20 million tickets, with an inflation-adjusted net income equivalent to nearly ₹3 billion (US$32 million) as of 2019. It was remade in Telugu as Bhale Ramudu (1984) and in Tamil as Velaikaran (1987). The song "Raat Baaki" has been recreated by Tanishk Bagchi for the movie Ittefaq. The movie is most famous for the dialogue 'I can talk English, I can walk English, I can laugh English because English is a very funny language.'

== Plot ==
Bhim Singh works as a manager and personal bodyguard to Seth Raja Singh and saves him from many murder attempts planned by Raja's step brother, Girdhar Singh. One day Raja Singh appoints Savitri, Bhim Singh's wife as trustee to their property and guardian to his toddler son Raja Kumar. On the same day, he and Bhim Singh die at the hands of Girdhar Singh. Savitri promises her husband that she would take care of Raja Kumar at any rate. Everyone including Bhim Singh's father Dashrath Singh blames Savitri thinking that she killed her husband and employer for money. Savitri hands over young Arjun to Dashrath Singh and settles herself as Raja Kumar's mother to protect him.

Later Arjun grows up to be a naive youngster under the care of Dashrath Singh. He moves to the city to build his life on his own and joins as a bellboy in a five star restaurant. There he meets Poonam and they both fall in love. That hotel is owned by Raja Kumar and run by Savitri. Hotel manager Ranjit Singh is the son of Girdhar Singh and plans to kill Raja. They manage to show Savitri as a culprit and Raja believes that and suspects Savitri.

Gradually Arjun learns that Savitri is actually his, not Raja's mother and swears that he would protect Raja at any rate, just like his father did. Meanwhile, Raja meets a beautiful young dancer Nisha and gets attracted to her. She is actually hired by Ranjit Singh to kill Raja, but Nisha falls in love with Raja and couldn't kill him. Finally she arranges a party on a boat to execute her plan, but Arjun foils it.

Finally goons kidnap Arjun's and Raja's family members and blackmail them to transfer all his property to Ranjit's name. Arjun and Raja beat all bad guys and save their loved ones. Raja marries Nisha and Arjun marries Poonam at the end and they reconcile with their mother Savitri.

== Cast ==
- Shashi Kapoor as Raj Singh
- Amitabh Bachchan as Arjun Singh
- Smita Patil as Poonam
- Parveen Babi as Nisha
- Waheeda Rehman as Savitri Singh
- Om Prakash as Dashrath Singh "Daddu"
- Ranjeet as Ranjeet Singh
- Satyen Kappu as Girdhar Singh
- Viju Khote as Talvar Singh
- Ram Sethi as Bhairon
- Kamal Kapoor as Raja Sahib
- Suresh Oberoi as Bheem Singh
- Ashalata Wabgaonkar as Nisha's Mother
- Dev Kumar as Hotel Guest

== Production ==
Mehra originally considered Rajesh Khanna for the role of Raja Singh, because Khanna and Bachchan starred in Namak Haraam a decade earlier, and it would be poetic justice to reverse roles in Namak Halaal. Complications led Mehra to next consider Raj Babbar for the role, which eventually went to Shashi Kapoor.

Bachchan portrays the protagonist Arjun Singh, who was influenced by the character Hrundi Bakshi, the protagonist of the 1968 Hollywood film The Party; Hrundi Bakshi is an Indian character portrayed by British comedian Peter Sellers.

Smita Patil was initially reluctant to film an intimate song "Aaj rapat jaye" in rain, She agreed after a lot of personal persuasion from co-actor Amitabh.

== Soundtrack ==
Namak Halaal

Film score by Bappi Lahiri
- Released: 1982
- Genre: Feature film soundtrack
- Language: Hindi
- Label: EMI Records Saregama
- Producer: Bappi Lahiri

The movie's soundtrack, featuring music composed by Bappi Lahiri, with lyrics written by Anjaan. Vocals supplied by Lahiri (for Kapoor), Kishore Kumar (for Bachchan), Asha Bhosle (for Patil and Babi), and Pandit Satyanarayan Mishra. Kumar won his fifth Filmfare Award for Best Male Playback Singer for the song 'Pag Ghungroo Bandh'.

No.	Title	Lyrics	Singer(s)	Length
1.	"Jawani Jan-E-Man"	Anjaan	Asha Bhosle	05:35
2.	"Pag Ghungroo Bandh" (Raga Darbari Kanada)	Anjaan, Prakash Mehra	Kishore Kumar, Pandit Satyanarayan Mishra	11:37
3.	"Aaj Rapat Jaayen To"	Anjaan	Kishore Kumar, Asha Bhosle	06:47
4.	"Raat Baaqi Baat Baaqi"	Anjaan	Asha Bhosle, Bappi Lahiri	06:19
5.	"Thodi Si Jo Pee Lee Hai"	Anjaan	Kishore Kumar	06:51
Total length:				37:13

== Awards ==
30th Filmfare Awards:

Won

- Best Male Playback Singer – Kishore Kumar for "Pag Ghungroo"

Nominated

- Best Actor – Amitabh Bachchan
- Best Supporting Actor – Shashi Kapoor
- Best Music Director – Bappi Lahiri
- Best Lyricist – Anjaan and Prakash Mehra for "Pag Ghungroo"
