= Hum Farishte Nahin =

- LP Vinyl Records Cover
- Directed by: Jatin Kumar
- Produced by: B. S. Suri
- Starring: Raj Babbar; Poonam Dhillon; Om Puri; Rameshwari; Kulbhushan Kharbanda; Amrish Puri
- Music by: Manoj–Gyan
- Release date: 5 February 1988
- Running time: 135 minutes
- Country: India
- Language: Hindi

Hum Farishte Nahin (transl. We are not Angels) is a 1988 Indian Hindi-language film directed by Jatin Kumar. It stars Raj Babbar, Poonam Dhillon, Om Puri, and Rameshwari. Smita Patil gave a special appearance as former lover of Raj Babbar's character.

== Plot ==
After escaping from prison, three convicts, among them Gopi (Om Puri), disguise themselves as servants and gain entry into a wealthy household with plans to steal its valuable jewelry. However, their intentions change when they discover that the family’s head, Shivraj Verma (Kulbhushan Kharbanda), has been devastated by the deceitfulness of the ruthless smuggler Purushottam, also known as Dindayal (Amrish Puri). Moved by Shivraj’s plight and the injustice he has endured, the trio decide to abandon their criminal intentions and instead help the family. Using their experience and teamwork, they set out to scuttle Purushottam’s plans, expose his wrongdoing, and thereby restore Shivraj’s honor and freedom.

== Cast ==
- Raj Babbar as Rajesh "Raja"
- Om Puri as Gopi "Tala Master"
- Poonam Dhillon as Sunita
- Rameshwari as Komal
- Smita Patil as Roma (Special Appearance)
- Deepak Seth as Baldev
- Kulbhushan Kharbanda as Shivraj Verma
- Sushma Seth as Mrs. Supriya Verma
- Amrish Puri as Purushottam / Dindayal

== Music ==
Song	Singer
"Sun Sun Sun Meri Sridevi"	Kishore Kumar
"Abhi Abhi Mera Dil"	Asha Bhosle
"Saanwla Badan"	Asha Bhosle
"Kudi Mar Gayi"	Neeta Banerjee
