= Bheegi Palkein =

- Directed by: Sisir Mishra
- Screenplay by: Sisir Mishra; Kartik Rath
- Story by: Sisir Mishra
- Produced by: K. K. Arya
- Starring: Raj Babbar; Smita Patil
- Edited by: Sudhakar
- Music by: Jugal Kishore; Tilak Raj
- Production companies: Filmistan; Film City; Natraj Essel
- Release date: 24 August 1982
- Running time: 123 minutes
- Country: India
- Language: Hindi

Bheegi Palkein (English: Moistened eyelids) is a 1982 Indian Bollywood romance drama film directed by Sisir Mishra and produced by K. K. Arya. It stars Raj Babbar and Smita Patil in pivotal roles.

== Plot ==
It was based on the story of an Odisha Brahmin family, and dealt with the caste system and marital differences.

The film starts with Ishwar Acharya (Raj Babbar), an I.A.S. officer who goes for an inspection of a Roman Catholic Mission school of Odisha. There, he meets Shanti, his estranged wife, (Smita Patil) who works as a teacher.

Ishwar (Raj Babbar) and Shanti (Smita Patil) were childhood friends. They lived, studied and travelled together and fell in love with each other as adults. When Ishwar's sister-in-law (Sulabha Deshpande) chose a bride for him, he refused and announced that he wants to marry Shanti. His entire family except his brother was opposed to this - because Shanti belongs to a lower caste and comes from a poor family. Ishwar gets a job in a private company and goes in for a registered marriage with Shanti after which they live separate from the joint family.

Marital differences soon crop up due to Ishwar's short temper and tendency to discount Shanti's opinion. After the birth of their son, Shanti starts working in a bank. But Ishwar doesn't like this. One day, Ishwar has a bike accident and blames Shanti for it. Shanti is more understanding and doesn't argue with him. During the same time, their son contracts fever and dies. When Ishwar learns of this he blames her, stops trusting her and returns to the joint family. Shanti also leaves the house after this and joins the Roman Catholic Mission school. Realising his mistake, Ishwar wants to apologize to her, but is not been able to locate her.

Flashback over. Ishwar goes to her cottage and wants her to go back with him. Shanti tells him that he shouldn't make a decision as her husband. Ishwar agrees that the husband has been defeated, and begs that they stay friends.

== Cast ==
- Raj Babbar as Ishwar Acharya
- Smita Patil as Shanti Acharya
- Dina Pathak as Mrs. Acharya
- Sulabha Deshpande as Janki Acharya
- Suresh Chatwal as Prakash Acharya
- Laxmi Chhaya as Ishwar's Sister
- Jagdeep as Hussain Bhai
- Asit Sen as Divisional Manager
- Leela Mishra as Chachi
- Umakant Mishra as Father at Church

== Music ==
The soundtrack was composed by Jugal Kishore–Tilak Raj and written by M. G. Hashmat and was very popular upon release. The song "O Mother Mary" earned special attention and popularity. The song "Janam Janam Ka Saath Hai" was also one of the most popular song of the year.

Song	Singer
"Jab Tak Maine Samjha"	Kishore Kumar
"Janam Janam Ka Sath Tha"	Lata Mangeshkar
"Nainon Mein Sapne Samaye"	Asha Bhosle, Amit Kumar
"Janam Janam Ka Sath Hai Tumhara Hamara"	Mohammed Rafi, Lata Mangeshkar
"O Mother Mary Teri Sharn Me"	Sushree Sangeeta, Chorus
"Aadmi Ki Zindagi Ka Aurat Nasha Hai"	Mohammed Rafi, Asha Bhosle

== Filming ==
The film locations included Jagannath Temple, Puri, Cuttack Chandi Temple (Cuttack), Udayagiri and Khandagiri Caves. The first song of this film was shot in Roman Catholic Church (Surada). Other scenes were shot in Cuttack, Bhubaneswar and Brahmapur. Basically the overall film was shot in Odisha and some studios in Mumbai.

== Crew ==
- Director: Sisir Mishra
- Producer: K. K. Arya
- Music Director: Jugal Kishore, Tilak Raj
- Lyrics: M. G. Hashmat
- Playback Singers: Amit Kumar, Asha Bhosle, Kishore Kumar, Lata Mangeshkar, Mohammad Rafi, Sangita Mahapatra
- Make up (sequence shot at Odisha): Samaresh Pal
