= Galiyon Ka Badshah =

- Film poster
- Directed by: Sher Jung Singh
- Produced by: K. Yogi
- Starring: Raaj Kumar; Hema Malini; Mithun Chakraborty; Poonam Dhillon; Smita Patil
- Music by: Kalyanji–Anandji
- Release date: 1990
- Running time: 135 minute
- Country: India
- Language: Hindi

Galiyon Ka Badshah (transl. King of the Lanes) is a 1990 Indian Hindi-language action film directed by Sher Jung Singh. The film stars Raaj Kumar, Hema Malini, Mithun Chakraborty, Poonam Dhillon, Smita Patil, Aruna Irani, Ranjeet, Danny Denzongpa, Om Shivpuri, Iftekhar. The film was shot and completed several years before its delayed release and also marked the final film of Smita Patil, who died in 1986.

== Cast ==
- Raaj Kumar as Raja / Ram
- Hema Malini as Billo
- Mithun Chakraborty as Sikandar
- Poonam Dhillon as Madhu
- Smita Patil as Tulsi
- Aruna Irani as Rani Sahiba
- Shreeram Lagoo as Abdul
- Parikshit Sahni as Rana
- Ranjeet as Tiger
- Danny Denzongpa as Inspector Vijay
- Om Shivpuri as Seth Vinod Kumar
- Iftekhar as Police Commissioner

== Music ==
The music was composed by the duo Kalyanji–Anandji.

Song	Singer
"Galiyon Ka Badshah"	Alka Yagnik
"Khushbu Laile Gangaram"	Alka Yagnik
"Hum Galiyon Ke Aware, Beghar Beghar Banjare"	Alka Yagnik, Sadhana Sargam
"Kya Kahoon, Kya Na Kahoon"	K. J. Yesudas, Sadhana Sargam
"Mujhe Zindagi Ki Dua"	Bhupinder Singh
"Mujhe Zindagi Ki Dua"	Lata Mangeshkar
"Mujhe Zindagi Ki" (Sad)	Lata Mangeshkar
"Aaya Main Pyar Ka"	Kishore Kumar
"Kya Yeh Mumkin Hai, Bolo Kya Ho Sakta Hai"	Kishore Kumar, Asha Bhosle
