= Angaaray (1986 film) =

1986 film directed by Rajesh Sethi

Angaaray अंगारे
- Promotional Poster
- Directed by: Rajesh Sethi
- Written by: Salim Khan (dialogues)
- Screenplay by: Salim Khan
- Story by: Salim Khan
- Produced by: Gurdip Singh
- Starring: Raj Babbar; Smita Patil
- Music by: Anu Malik
- Release date: 21 November 1986
- Country: India
- Language: Hindi
- Box office: ₹8.79 Crores

Angaaray (transl. Flames) is a 1986 Hindi-language romantic thriller film directed by Rajesh Sethi and starring Raj Babbar, Smita Patil in the main lead roles. Rajesh Khanna has done a special appearance. The dialogue, screenplay and story has been written by Salim Khan.

== Plot ==
Aarti Verma (Smita Patil) is an educated girl living with her young brother Sanjay Verma (Alankar Joshi) and her mother. She joins as the personal secretary to Jolly (Shakti Kapoor). Meanwhile, Vijay (Raj Babbar) develops a desire that he should marry Aarti, although he does not propose to her directly. One day Vijay finds that Aarti's brother is a drug addict and promptly informs Aarti. She convinces her brother to join the army so that he becomes a disciplined person in his life. After a few days Jolly tries to rape Aarti and Vijay comes to the rescue.

Meanwhile, Aarti participates in a function where she is supposed to dance and there she is noticed for her dancing skills by the audience and from the audience section. After seeing her performance, Vijay's friend Ravi falls in love with Aarti. Ravi even secures permission from his and her parents to marry her and gets engaged to her and after that Ravi goes abroad. However, Jolly manages to find a chance to rape Aarti traumatizing her. On learning the truth, Ravi's parents cancel Ravi's marriage to Aarti and at this juncture Aarti finds out that Vijay had loved her the whole time.

Vijay offers to marry her but his own mother disapproves of this alliance upon knowing that Aarti is a girl who was raped in the past. Disillusioned, Aarti goes and meets the tawaif Heerabai (Bindu) and becomes a tawaif. After few months her brother returns to the town and after becoming aware of the events which took place, decides to kill Jolly. The plan backfires and Jolly kills him. To take revenge, Aarti murders Jolly. The rest of the story is about how the court cases happens and what sentence is pronounced for Aarti and whom will she marry at last.

== Reception ==
The box office collections were Rs. 8.79 crores in 1986. It received three and half stars in Bollywood Guide Collections.

== Cast ==
- Rajesh Khanna as Ravi (Special Appearance)
- Raj Babbar as Inspector Vijay
- Smita Patil as Aarti Verma
- Nirupa Roy as Mrs. Verma
- Bindu as Heerabai
- Shakti Kapoor as Jolly
- Alankar Joshi as Sanjay Verma
- Iftekhar as Khan Chacha
- Satyen Kappu as Ravi's Father
- Dina Pathak as Vijay's Mother
- Pradeep Kumar as Police Commissioner
- Prema Narayan as Sub-Inspector Meena Shrivastav
- Mohan Sherry as Mehta

== Soundtrack ==
All lyrics are written by Rajendra Krishan; all music is composed by Anu Malik.

| No. | Title | Singer(s) | Length |
|---|---|---|---|
| 1. | "Pyar Kahte Hai Jise" | Kishore Kumar |
| 2. | "Mubarak Ho Mubarak Ho" | Suresh Wadkar, Mohammad Aziz, Anuradha Paudwal |
| 3. | "Mujhe Zindagi Ne Mara" | Asha Bhosle |
| 4. | "Ek Tahzeebon Ka Sangam Hai" | Kavita Krishnamurthy |
| 5. | "Tauba Tauba Karoge" | Asha Bhosle |
