= Thikana (film) =

- Directed by: Mahesh Bhatt
- Written by: Suraj Saneem
- Screenplay by: Suraj Sanim
- Story by: Suraj Sanim
- Produced by: Paul Arora; V. B. Soni
- Starring: Smita Patil; Anil Kapoor; Amrita Singh; Satish Kaushik; Anupam Kher; Suresh Oberoi
- Cinematography: Adeep Tandon
- Edited by: Tara Singh
- Music by: Kalyanji–Anandji
- Production company: Dilliwala Films
- Release date: 30 October 1987
- Country: India
- Language: Hindi

Thikana is a 1987 Hindi crime drama film directed by Mahesh Bhatt. It stars Smita Patil, Anil Kapoor and Amrita Singh in lead roles.

== Plot ==
Alcoholic lawyer Ravi Goel does not get cases because he refuses to lie. He lives with his mother and sister Shashi, who also happens to be the breadwinner for the family.

MP Rane rapes a girl and is videotaped by a cameraman. Rane has both of them killed. Meanwhile, Shashi becomes pregnant from Ranveer Singh. She refuses to marry him because she feels that when she would leave her family, they would be in trouble. Ranbir convinces Ravi to take on cases to fight in the court.

Tea shop owner Chakradhari tells Ravi that dancer Shaila's brother has been missing for some time. Ravi begins searching for her brother and discovering his death, tries to find the killers.

== Cast ==
- Smita Patil as Shashi Goel
- Anil Kapoor as Ravi Goel
- Amrita Singh as Shaila
- Satish Kaushik as Chakradhari
- Anupam Kher as Inspector Anwar Ali
- Suresh Oberoi as Inspector Ranveer Singh
- Rohini Hattangadi as Mrs. Goel
- Avtar Gill as MP Rane
- Madan Jain as Cameraman Avinash

== Songs ==
Anjaan wrote the songs.

Song	Singer
"Ajnabee Koi Kabhi"	Asha Bhosle
"Bachana Dil Bachana"	Asha Bhosle
"Aasman Chhat Ho Meri"	Suresh Wadkar
"Dua Samajh Lo"	Suresh Wadkar
"Thoda Sa Gham" (Male)	Suresh Wadkar
"Thoda Sa Gham" (Female)	Alka Yagnik

== Production ==
During the film's shooting actress Smita Patil became pregnant but continued working for the film. She cited that housemaids also work when they are pregnant. She died on 13 December 1986 due to childbirth complications, just a few days after the birth of her and Raj Babbar's son Prateik Babbar.

Arshad Warsi assisted Bhatt for Kaash and Thikana.

== Reception ==
Akshay Shah of PlanetBollywood.com gave the film a rating of 8/10. He praised the story, direction, Suresh Oberoi and Anil Kapoor's performance. Shah felt that Kapoor's performance was underrated. He called Patil a "disappointment" and termed the remaining cast as "average". He also said that Paresh Rawal or Kader Khan could have done better than Avtar Gill in the MP's role. Mint's Nandini Ramnath called Patil's role one of her most underrated ones. Dawn has called the film "one of [Bhatt's] most searching studies of flexible middle-class morality". Despite the critical acclaim, it was a commercial failure.
