= Mirch Masala =

- Theatrical release poster
- Directed by: Ketan Mehta
- Written by: Chunilal Madia; Ketan Mehta; Tripurari Sharma
- Produced by: NFDC
- Starring: Naseeruddin Shah; Smita Patil; Om Puri; Suresh Oberoi; Deepti Naval; Dina Pathak; Mohan Gokhale; Paresh Rawal
- Cinematography: Jehangir Choudhary
- Edited by: Sanjiv Shah
- Music by: Rajat Dholakia
- Release date: 13 February 1987
- Running time: 128 minutes
- Country: India
- Language: Hindi

Mirch Masala (Translation: Hot Spice/ Spice, excitement, or added drama/ exaggeration) is a 1987 Indian Hindi-language psychological thriller film directed by Ketan Mehta. Before making this film, Ketan Mehta had made Bavani Bhavai (1980), trying to portray the psyche of an oppressed people and grass-roots resistance. Mirch Masala is a step further, and clearly shows the maturity its maker attained in that 4-year gap. It stars Naseeruddin Shah and Smita Patil in the lead roles. On the centenary of Indian cinema in April 2013, Forbes included Smita Patil's performance in the film on its list, "25 Greatest Acting Performances of Indian Cinema". The film was released after the death of Smita Patil and remains one of her most important films.

== Plot ==
In the early 1940s, an arrogant Subedar (Naseeruddin Shah) (local tax collector in colonial India) and his henchmen ride into a village, scaring a group of women fetching water. Sonbai (Smita Patil) alone stands her ground and politely asks them not to let horses into the village's potable water source.

Subedar settles into his camp and the Mukhi (trans. the chieftain) of the village visits him to pay respect. Subedar's gramophone is an object of fascination for the men of the village. Mukhi's frequent absence from home is resented by his wife. The schoolmaster (Benjamin Gilani), tries to get her to enrol her only daughter in the school. When she does, other women ridicule her. Mukhi pulls his daughter out and beats his wife for disobeying him. The mukhi's younger brother (Mohan Gokhale) is in love with a lower caste girl, but dares not mention it. When their liaison is found out, the girl's father beats her and tries get the mukhi to agree to a marriage. The mukhi rejects the proposal as unsuitable.

The subedar's men routinely loot the village for food, livestock, and supplies. When Mukhi brings a woman to him, he is disappointed that she is not Sonbai, but beds her nonetheless. He persists in wooing Sonbai, but when his demands turn forceful, she slaps him across the face and runs away. Enraged, he orders his soldiers to bring her. Sonbai takes refuge in a masala karkhana (a spice factory where red chillies are ground into powder). Abu Mian (Om Puri), the wizened old Muslim gatekeeper and factory guard shuts the factory doors keeping the soldiers out. The subedar attempts to get the gates open through the factory owner and the mukhi fail. Abu Mian refuses to compromise on his job of providing security to the factory employees.

Subedar's threats of destroying the village prompt the mukhi to convene the village panchayat. The villagers hold Sonbai responsible for inciting the subedar and decide that she should yield to him. The schoolmaster points out that once they give in for one, there will be nothing to stop the subedar from demanding others, even perhaps the mukhi's own wife. Mukhi thrashes him and throws him out. Mukhi reports back to the subedar that they will hand over Sonbai on the condition that the subedar will not make further demands of this nature. The subedar laughs off this condition and has the schoolmaster tied up to a post.

The mukhi brings pressure on Sonbai, but she stands firm. Within the factory, the women who once supported Sonbai now turn upon her. They fear that if she does not yield, the subedar may send his men to indiscriminately molest the womenfolk. Sonbai nearly relents, but is stopped by Abu Mian. She resolves to stand firm. Abu Mian chides the mukhi and the villagers; they may lord it over their wives at home, but are not man enough to face the subedar.

The subedar orders his soldiers to charge the factory, and they smash down the door. Abu Mian manages to shoot one of the soldiers, but he is shot dead immediately after. The subedar enters the factory and tries to grab Sonbai. The women of the factory mount a sudden and surprising defense. They attack the subedar with bagfuls of lal mirch masala (fresh ground red chilli powder) in teams of two. The film ends with the subedar on his knees, screaming in pain as the chilli burns his face and eyes.

== Cast ==
- Naseeruddin Shah as Subedar/Sarkar, the villain
- Smita Patil as Sonbai
- Raj Babbar as Sonbai's husband, guest appearance
- Om Puri as Abu Mian, the factory watchman
- Suresh Oberoi as Mukhi, the village headman
- Deepti Naval as Saraswati -Mukhi's wife
- Benjamin Gilani as the school master
- Harish Patel as the priest
- Paresh Rawal as a villager
- Amol Gupte as a villager
- Dina Pathak as the old village woman inside the factory
- Ratna Pathak Shah as Pallavi, a village woman inside the factory
- Supriya Pathak as Radha, a village woman inside the factory
- Mohan Gokhale as Mukhi's younger brother and lover of Radha
- Deep Dhillon as soldier of Subhedar/Sarkar
- Ahmed Khan as soldier of Subhedar/Sarkar
- Ram Gopal Bajaj as Jeevan Thakkar, owner of pepper factory
- Vipin sharma as villager

== Reviews ==
Siddhi Pathak of FeminisminIndia.com gave a very positive review and wrote "Of all the Bollywood feminist films out there, Mirch Masala gets it right in so many ways with its clarity of the differences of experience of women of different social locations". Bubla Basu of Scroll.in gave a positive review and commented "Spun in rustic earthy colours, ground in folklore and pounded with melodrama, Mirch Masala is a must-watch tale of spiced vengeance". Federica Giampaolo of Asianmoviepulse.com gave a very positive review and commented "Ketan Mehta’s tale does not spare any time in exposing the active, hypocritical, and even passive perpetrators of a pervasive patriarchal regime. It succeeds in embodying a powerful message through incredible storytelling and an attentive and varied portrayal of society. “Mirch Masala” is a must-watch story of heated retribution, spun in earthy, rustic colors, rooted in folklore, and hammered with melodrama".

== Awards and nominations ==
Year	Nominee / work	Award	Result
1986	Producer: NFDC; Director: Ketan Mehta	National Film Award for Best Feature Film in Hindi	Won
1986	Suresh Oberoi	National Film Award for Best Supporting Actor	Won
1986	Sanjiv Shah	National Film Award for Best Editing	Won
1987	Ketan Mehta	Golden Prize at 15th Moscow International Film Festival	Nominated
1988	Suresh Oberoi	Bengal Film Journalists' Association – Best Supporting Actor Award	Won
