= Smita Patil =

Indian actress (1955–1986)

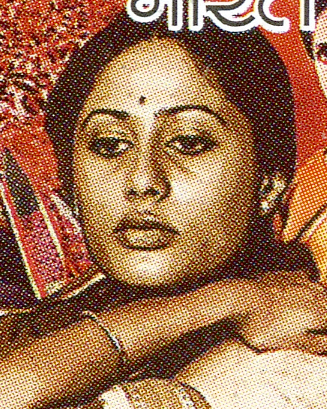
- Patil on a 2013 Indian postage stamp
- Born: 17 October 1955; Poona, Bombay State, India
- Died: 13 December 1986 (aged 31); Bombay, Maharashtra, India
- Occupations: Actress, television newscaster
- Years active: 1974–1986
- Works: Full list
- Spouse: Raj Babbar
- Children: Prateik Smita Patil
- Parent: Shivajirao Girdhar Patil (father)
- Honors: Padma Shri (1985)

Smita Patil (17 October 1955 – 13 December 1986) was an Indian actress who primarily worked in Hindi and Marathi films. Regarded among the finest actresses in the history of Indian cinema, she was known for her unconventional portrayal of strong and independent women. Patil appeared in over 80 films, in a career that spanned over a decade and was the recipient of two National Film Awards, a Filmfare Award, a Maharashtra State Film Award and two Filmfare Awards Marathi. In 1985, Patil received the Padma Shri, India's fourth-highest civilian honour.

Patil made her film debut with Shyam Benegal's Charandas Chor (1975). She became one of the leading actresses of parallel cinema, a New Wave movement in India cinema, though she also appeared in several mainstream movies throughout her career. Her performances were highly acclaimed, and her most notable roles include Manthan (1976), Bhumika (1977) for which she won her first National Film Award for Best Actress, Jait Re Jait (1978), Aakrosh (1980), Chakra (1981) which earned her a second National Film Award for Best Actress and her first and only Filmfare Award for Best Actress, Namak Halaal (1982), Bazaar (1982), Umbartha (1982), Shakti (1982), Arth (1982), Ardh Satya (1983), Mandi (1983), Aaj Ki Awaaz (1984), Chidambaram (1985), Mirch Masala (1987), Amrit (1986), Dance Dance (1987) and Waaris (1988).

Apart from acting, Patil was an active feminist and a member of the Women's Centre in Mumbai. She was deeply committed to the advancement of women's issues and gave her endorsement to films which sought to explore the role of women in traditional Indian society, their sexuality, and the changes facing the middle-class woman in an urban milieu.

Patil was married to actor Raj Babbar, with whom she had a son, actor Prateik Smita Patil. She died on 13 December 1986 at the age of 31 due to childbirth complications. Over ten of her films were released after her death.

== Early life ==
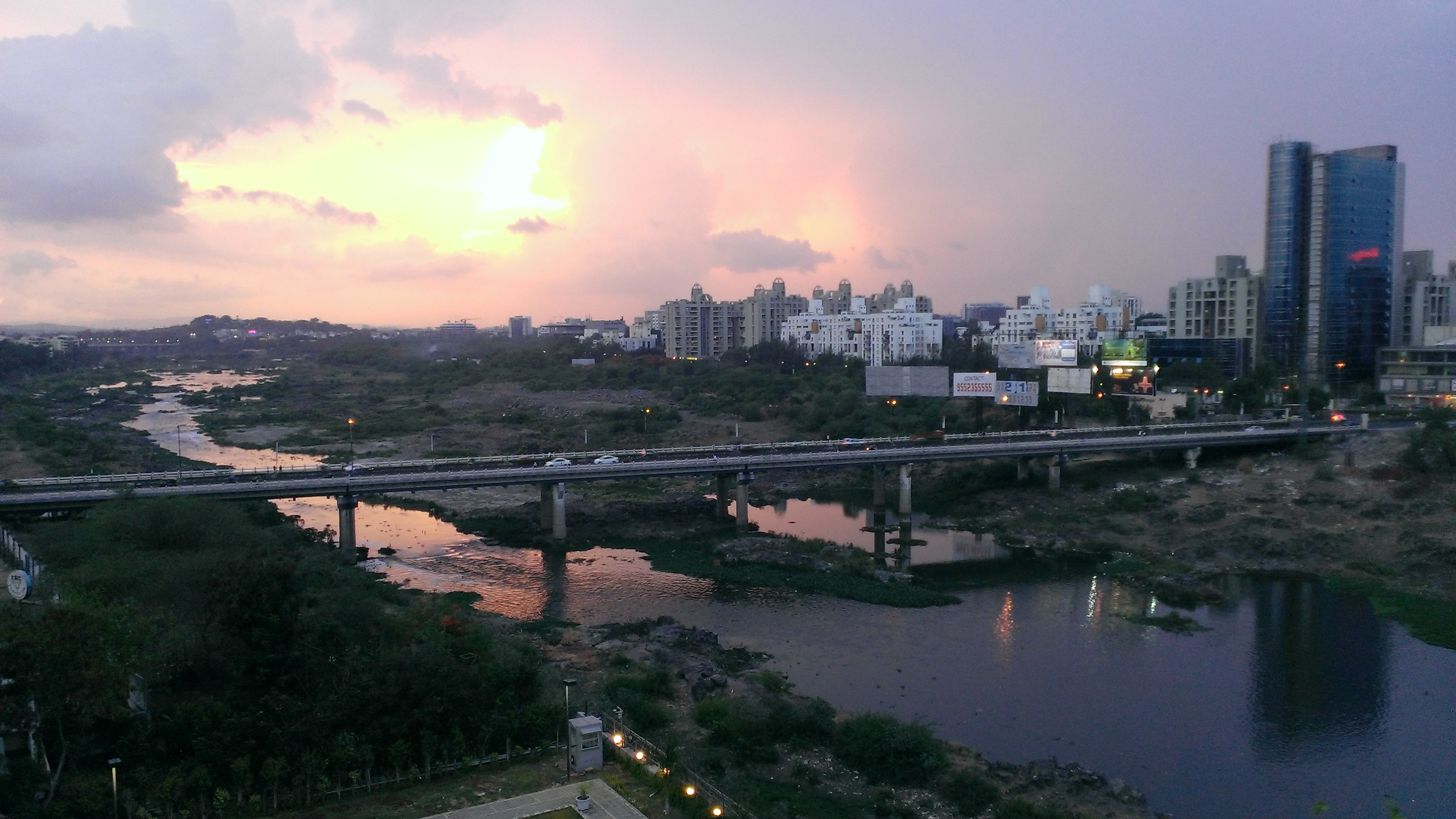
Patil was born and brought up in Pune

Smita Patil was born on 17 October 1955, in Pune, Maharashtra into a Hindu-Marathi family, to a Maharashtrian politician father, Shivajirao Girdhar Patil and social worker mother Vidyatai Patil, from Shirpur town of Khandesh province of Maharashtra. She has two sisters, Dr. Anita Patil Deshmukh, a faculty neonatologist and Manya Patil Seth, a costume designer.

As a child, Patil participated in dramas. Patil studied literature at University of Mumbai, and was a part of local theatre groups in Pune and spent much of her time at the campus of the Film and Television Institute of India (FTII), causing many to mistake her for an alumna. The family mov's election as a cabinet minister.

== Career ==
=== Debut and early success (1974–1980) ===
Patil began her career in the early 1970s as a television newsreader on the newly transmitting Mumbai Doordarshan, the Indian government run broadcaster. Her first film role was in the FTII student film Teevra Madhyam by Arun Khopkar. Shyam Benegal then discovered her and cast her in his 1974 children's film, Charandas Chor. Patil's first major role was in his other film, Manthan, in which she played a Harijan woman who leads the revolt of the milk co-operative.

Patil then won her first National Film Award for Best Actress and her first nomination for the Filmfare Award for Best Actress for her performance in the Hindi film Bhumika, just three years after her debut. The film, in which she portrays an actress leading a tumultuous life through sudden fame and stardom, brought her talent to the attention of the world. Patil attended the Cannes Film Festival in 1976 with Shabana Azmi and Shyam Benegal for the film Nishant. Patil won Filmfare Award for Best Actress – Marathi for her performance in Jait Re Jait in 1977.

=== Acclaim in parallel cinema and stardom (1981–1987) ===
Patil was a part of the radically political cinema of the 1970s, which included actresses such as Shabana Azmi and Deepti Naval. Her work includes films with parallel cinema directors like Shyam Benegal, Govind Nihalani, Satyajit Ray (Sadgati, 1981), G. Aravindan (Chidambaram, 1985) and Mrinal Sen as well as forays into the more commercial Hindi film industry cinema of Mumbai. In her films, Patil's character often represents an intelligent femininity that stands in relief against the conventional background of male-dominated cinema. Patil was a women's rights activist and became famous for her roles in films that portrayed women as capable and empowered.

Patil received widespread critical acclaim for her performances in Chakra (1981), which earned her a second National Film Award for Best Actress and her first and only Filmfare Award for Best Actress. As a part of her preparation for the role of a slum-dweller, Patil used to visit the slums in Bombay during the making of Chakra.

Patil went onto star in Bazaar (1982) and Aaj Ki Awaaz (1984), which earned her two nomination for the Filmfare Award for Best Actress. For Mandi (1983), she earned her a nomination for the Filmfare Award for Best Supporting Actress. Patil's performance in the marital drama Arth (1982) was highly appreciated. For her portrayal as "the other woman" while acting opposite Shabana Azmi, she earned a second nomination for the Filmfare Award for Best Supporting Actress. During this time, she also starred in several notable Marathi film Umbartha (1982), winning her second Filmfare Award for Best Actress – Marathi for her performance in the films.

Patil gradually moved to more commercial cinema. In an interview, she stated:

"I remained committed to small cinema for about five years ... I refused all commercial offers. Around 1977–78, the small cinema movement started picking up and they needed names. I was unceremoniously dropped from a couple of projects. This was a very subtle thing but it affected me a lot. I told myself that here I am and I have not bothered to make money. I have turned down big, commercial offers because of my commitment to small cinema and what have I got in return? If they want names I'll make a name for myself. So I started and took whatever came my way."

In time, commercial filmmakers like Raj Khosla, Ramesh Sippy and B.R. Chopra offered her roles, agreeing that she was "excellent". Her fans, too, grew with her new-found stardom. Patil's glamorous roles in her more commercial films, such as Shakti (1982) and Namak Halaal (1982) with Amitabh Bachchan. She showed that one can act in both, "serious" cinema and the "Hindi cinema" masala in the Hindi film industry. However, her sister Manya Patil Seth stated, "Smita was never comfortable in big-budget movies. She wept her heart out after performing the rain dance with Mr Bachchan in Namak Halaal; she felt she wasn't doing the right thing." In 1984, she served as a jury member of the Montreal World Film Festival. Patil acted with Raj Babbar in films such as Bheegi Palkein, Tajurba, Aaj Ki Awaaz, Awam and Hum Do Hamare Do and later fell in love with him.

Director C. V. Sridhar was the first one to pair her opposite Rajesh Khanna in Dil-E-Nadan in 1982. After the success of this film, Patil and Khanna were paired in successful films like Aakhir Kyon?, Anokha Rishta, Angaarey, Nazrana, Amrit. With the release of Aakhir Kyon? her popularity and her pairing with Khanna were at its peak. The songs "Dushman Na Kare Dost Ne Woh" and "Ek Andhera Lakh Sitare" from Aakhir Kyon? were chartbusters. Each of these films were different and dealt with various social issues. Their performances were critically acclaimed. In 1986, Amrit directed by Mohan Kumar became the fifth highest-grossing film of the year. Nazrana, co-starring Sridevi released posthumously and became a box office success and was among the top 10 films of 1987.

"Patil was a great actress. Many of her great performances are laser-like in focus on a few things. So Arth for instance was about vulnerability and desire. Jait Re Jait was about resilience and belief. Mirch Masala covers the entire oeuvre of her acting chops. From the low key of the early frames to the full blast upper registers in the closing stages of the film: The transformation is awesome."

— Forbes India on Patil's performance in Mirch Masala (1987)

Patil's association with artistic cinema remained strong, however. Her arguably greatest (and unfortunately final) role came when Patil re-teamed with Ketan Mehta to play the feisty and fiery Sonbai in Mirch Masala, which released after her death in 1987. Patil's performance as a spirited spice-factory worker who stands up against a lecherous petty official in this film was highly praised, and won her the Bengal Film Journalists' Association Award for Best Actress (Hindi). On the centenary of Indian cinema in April 2013, Forbes included her performance in the film on its list, "25 Greatest Acting Performances of Indian Cinema". The Washington Post called her work "an enigmatically feisty final performance".

=== Posthumous films (1987–1990) ===
Some of Patil's last works and posthumous releases include the Bengali film Debshishu, where she worked without remuneration, Hum Farishte Nahin, Dance Dance, Insaniyat Ke Dushman, Thikana, Oonch Neech Beech and Waaris. Patil was pregnant during the filming of Thikana. For Waaris, Patil received wide acclaim. The 1990 film Galiyon Ka Badshah marked her final film appearance. For Waaris, Patil won her final acting award, the Lux Award for Best Actress.

== Personal life ==
Patil was an active feminist and was a member of the Women's Centre in Mumbai. She attempted to portray women's issues through her different films. She was also involved in charity work, donating the winnings of her first National Award to charity.

When Patil became romantically involved with actor Raj Babbar, she drew severe criticism from her fans and the media, clouding her personal life and throwing her into the eye of a media storm. Raj Babbar left his wife Nadira Babbar to marry Patil. Babbar and Patil first met on the sets of the 1982 film Bheegi Palkein. Their son, actor Prateik Babbar was born on 28 November 1986.

== Death ==
Patil died from childbirth complications (Puerperal sepsis) on 13 December 1986, aged 31. Nearly two decades later, notable film director Mrinal Sen alleged that Patil had died due to "gross medical negligence". After Patil's death, her son was raised by her parents in Mumbai. According to the media, she died an idol, a cult figure reaching beyond her grave. On her death, poet Kaifi Azmi said in his inaugural speech at a charity function, "Smita Patil is not dead. Her son is still amongst us."

== Public image ==
Patil is regarded as one of the greatest and most accomplished actresses of Indian cinema. Rediff.com placed her as the second-greatest Indian actress of all time, behind Nargis. In 2022, she was placed in Outlook India's 75 Best Bollywood Actresses list. Patil was placed 5th in Rediff.com's "Best Bollywood Debut Ever" list, for her films Charandas Chor and Manthan. Patil was known for her beauty and fashion throughout the 70s and 80s. In the media, she is cited a style icon with various publications like Hindustan Times, including her among the topmost sex symbols of Bollywood. Yahoo! placed Patil 5th in its "Ten most iconic beauties of Hindi cinema" list, and Times of India's placed her in its "50 Beautiful Faces" list. In 2023, Rajeev Masand named Patil as one of Hindi cinema's best actresses of all time.

Patil is highly regarded for her range as an actor, her beauty, and her style. Suresh Kohli of Deccan Herald noted, "Smita Patil was, perhaps, the most accomplished actress of Hindi cinema. Her oeuvre is outstanding, investing almost every portrayal with a powerhouse realistic performance." Several actresses have been inspired by Patil's work. Actress Deepika Padukone said, "Smita Patil is someone whose work I admire a lot." Bhumi Pednekar credited the actress for "ushering in the change for heroines on screen", by her progressive portrayals. Katrina Kaif said, "Smita Patil's roles were an inspiration and touched the lives of millions of women. She showed us that not even sky is the limit" Somy Ali said that Patil inspired her to become an actress, she also termed Patil, her "favourite". Rekha termed Patil a "far better actor" than her or anybody else.

Talking about Patil, her co-actor Om Puri stated: "Smita had an understanding of love, a lot of sincerity and warmth came through in her performances. She was a Bohemian. She was not class conscious, rather was very bubbly, full of life. Never saw her low or depressed about anything. Very liberated and progressive in her thoughts and work." Andrew Robinson wrote in his book Satyajit Ray: The Inner Eye, that Ray once said, "There is no one who can replace Smita Patil". Aruna Vasudev termed Patil as one of the "most intense" actress, Indian cinema ever had. Sumita S. Chakravarty noted that, "In the 1960-1970, "new cinema" emerged and Patil became one of the foremost actress of the prosixties. Filmmaker Mahesh Bhatt added, "There was something very special about her from the start. When I decided to make Arth, I wanted to make it with two powerful actresses as the wife and the other woman. Looking back, I'm proud to say that Smita Patil [with Shabana Azmi] made Arth what it was." Actor Nawazuddin Siddiqui praised Patil's beauty and said, "Smita Patil would appear as a typical Indian girl. But as soon as she faced the camera, no one looked more beautiful. If she were here today, she would have been a favourite for international filmmakers. The West was drawn to her."

== Reception and legacy ==
Patil is known among the greatest actresses of Indian cinema. On Patil's successful film career, Rachit Gupta of Filmfare noted, "Her dusky, unconventional looks, choice of roles, active socio-political career worked to her advantage. Smita Patil made an enviable movie career." Mamun M. Adil of Pakistan's newspaper Dawn noted, "Patil was in her early 20s when she delivered towering turns which, speak volumes for the talent that simmered behind her mesmerising eyes." Santanu Das of Hindustan Times added, "Rarely has an actor arrived in Indian Cinema quite like Patil; so full-bodied in her approach to the art of performance." Filmmaker Shyam Benegal praised the actress and said, "Smita Patil was a chameleon. She could be a part of the story without your thinking about it. She was instinctive. The camera loved her. The camera looked at her, it picked her out of everyone else. That was the thing about her." News18 India named her as an actress "remembered for her work and influence" and noted, "Smita Patil was famous for her serious roles, expressive eyes, and impeccable acting."

=== Acting style and screen image ===
Patil is considered among the finest actresses. She established herself as one of the most prominent actress of arthouse and parallel cinema, and was widely known as the "Queen of parallel cinema and new wave movement". Patil was also known for her work in the mainstream films. Writing for Scroll.in, film critic Maithili Rao stated, "Art or mainstream, Smita was a magnet to film-makers hopelessly in love with her screen presence and the wonderful woman behind the image." Gargi Nandwana from The Indian Express stated, "Smita Patil's films fearlessly traversed uncharted terrain — an absolute anathema for a Bollywood actress of that time poised for an illustrious career — navigating the intricate nuances, complexities, strengths, and vulnerabilities intrinsic to the female experience."

Patil was known for her path-breaking roles and she changed the portrayal of women onscreen with her morally complex characters. Patil received critical acclaim for her portrayal of a feisty village girl in Manthan, an actress in Bhumika, a rape victim in Aakrosh, a slum-dweller in Chakra, a woman involved with a married man in Arth, a prostitute and classical singer in Mandi, a divorcee in Aakhir Kyon? and a strong woman against oppressors in Mirch Masala. Forbes included her performance in Mirch Masala in its, "25 Greatest Acting Performances of Indian Cinema" list. Filmfare included Patil's performances in Bhumika and Mirch Masala in its list of "80 Iconic Performances" of Bollywood, placed 24th and 8th respectively. For Bhumika, it noted, "Smita's role is memorable not only because of her keen understanding of an actor and a woman's mindset but also because she flawlessly became Hansa during the film-within-the-film portions and her act giving the bygone era glimpse." NDTV added her character, Usha, from Bhumika in its "Trailblazing Women of Bollywood" list.

On not working in commercial cinema, Patil said, "I hope I don't get pushed into doing commercial films because, truly, that will be the end of Smita Patil." Shaikh Ayaz of The Indian Express noted, "In this repertory of talent that dominated the Hindi art cinema landscape, Patil was but a comet. Her films made space for feminist interventions, serving as a template for every succeeding generation of actors." Praising Patil's screen presence and work, S. Shivakumar of The Hindu termed her a "rare and refreshing exception in cinema" and said, "The lines between parallel and mainstream cinema may have blurred but her performances in both are priceless." Raja Sen from Rediff.com noted, "The more striking side of the coin was Smita Patil, who had a compellingly intelligent presence that stood for both empowerment and sensitivity." Ali Peter John from Bollywood Hungama noted, "Smita Patil was a complete and consummate actress, whose ability to face the most difficult challenges and triumph over them has become a part of the art of great acting. She was the life of art, parallel or new wave cinema."

== Accolades ==
=== Civilian Award ===
Year	Award	Work	Result	Ref.
1985	Padma Shri	Contribution in the field of Arts	Honoured	

=== Film Awards ===
Year	Award	Category	Work	Result	Ref.
1977	National Film Awards	Best Actress	Bhumika	Won	
1978	Filmfare Awards	Best Actress	Bhumika	Nominated	
1978	Filmfare Marathi Awards	Best Actress – Marathi	Jait Re Jait	Won	
1980	National Film Awards	Best Actress	Chakra	Won	
1982	Filmfare Awards	Best Actress	Chakra	Won	
1983	Filmfare Awards	Best Actress	Bazaar	Nominated	
1983	Filmfare Marathi Awards	Best Actress – Marathi	Umbartha	Won	
1983	Maharashtra State Film Awards	Best Actress	Umbartha	Won	
1984	Filmfare Awards	Best Supporting Actress	Arth	Nominated	
1984	Filmfare Awards	Best Supporting Actress	Mandi	Nominated	
1985	Filmfare Awards	Best Actress	Aaj Ki Aawaz	Nominated	
1987	Bengal Film Journalists' Association Awards	Best Actress – Hindi	Mirch Masala	Won	
1989	Star & Style - Lux Awards	Best Actress	Waaris	Won	

== Honours and tributes ==
"I describe her as an illusion. She was not intelligent or intellectual but sensitive. Intense. And there were people all over the world who cared for her. From John Warrington to a Polish actor, a Swedish director, they were all in love with her."

— Mohan Agashe on Smita Patil (Smita Patil, A Brief Incandescence)

The Priyadarshni Academy started the Smita Patil Memorial Award for Best Actress, as a tribute to the veteran actress in 1986. It is awarded every other year to an actress for her contribution to Indian cinema. In 2012, the Smita Patil International Film Festival Documentaries and Shorts was initiated in her honour. In 2015, film critic Maithili Rao published Patil's biography "Smita Patil: A Brief Incandescence". In the same year, National Centre for the Performing Arts and National Film Archive of India organised a retrospective on the actress named, "Smita - A minor retrospective of a major actress". In 1989, Meera Dewan, made a documentary on her, named "Searching for Smita". Odissi dancer Jhelum Paranjape named her dance institute "Smitalaya" (launched in 1989), in fond memory of Patil. Smita Patil Street Theatre, has been named in the late actress honor.

On the occasion of 100 years of the Indian cinema, a postage stamp bearing her face was released by India Post to honour her on 3 May 2013. Patil's father, Shivajirao Giridhar Patil started the Smita Patil Charitable Trust in 1996, in her memory. It was started with a mission to provide co-education to the students of the rural areas. The same year, a school named, Smita Patil Public School was started in Dhule, Maharashtra. In 2010, the Indo-American Arts Council, organised an 11-film retrospective of the late actress’ films in New York. The Polish Film Institute and the Indian embassy in Warsaw organised "Smita Patil Retrospect", in Poland in her memory. Thus, she became the first Indian actress to be honored with a retrospective abroad. In 2023, her son Prateik Babbar changed his name to Prateik Patil Babbar, as a heartfelt homage to his late mother. He said, "When my name appears in film credits or anywhere, I want it to be a reminder to myself, the people and the audience, of her extraordinary and remarkable legacy, of my legacy, a reminder of her brilliance and greatness."

== In popular culture ==
=== In film ===
- In 2012, India Times included her film Arth (1982), in its "25 must-see Bollywood films" list.
- In 2013, News18 included her 1982 films - Umbartha and Akaler Shandhaney, in its "100 greatest Indian films" list.
- While, Richa Chadha gave Patil a tribute by recreating her look for a magazine shoot, actress Madhuri Pawar gave her a tribute by recreating her Jait Re Jait's look.
- In 2024, restored version of her 1976 film Manthan was selected for premier at the Cannes Film Festival.

=== Biography ===
- In 2015, film critic Maithili Rao, wrote Patil's biography titled, Smita Patil: A Brief Incandescence.
