= Shafi Inamdar =

Indian actor (1945–1996)

- Born: 23 October 1945; Pangari, Bombay Province, British India
- Died: 13 March 1996 (aged 50); Mumbai, Maharashtra, India
- Occupations: Actor, producer, director
- Years active: 1979–1995
- Spouse: Bhakti Barve

Shafi Inamdar (23 October 1945 – 13 March 1996) was an Indian actor. He started his film career with the film Vijeta and continued it in Ardh Satya. He acted in a number of television serials including Yeh Jo Hai Zindagi. His most notable film roles include the inspector in Aaj Ki Awaz, the villain in Awam and the friend of the hero in films like Nazrana, Anokha Rishta, Amrit. Some of his other films are Jurm, Khatron Ke Khiladi, Kudrat Ka Kanoon, Sadaa Suhagan and Love 86, all are successful.

== Life and career ==
Shafi Inamdar received his early education at Pangari Dapoli, Ratnagiri, MS and at St. Joseph's High School in Umerkhadi (Dongri) in Mumbai, India, where he passed his S.S.C exam in 1958. He did his B.Sc. from K.C College in 1963.

He is particularly known for playing the common man's role. He has acted in numerous television shows, the most notable being Kundan Shah's Yeh Jo Hai Zindagi, telecast on Doordarshan in the 80s which made him a household name. The show went on to become so popular that it even started affecting the business of films, as it used to be aired late on Friday nights. The serial was such a hit that it ran for 61 episodes when generally a serial ran for a maximum of 25 weeks. One of his last performances on television was in Teri Bhi Chup Meri Bhi Chup. He also played the role of an advocate in the Hindi film Yeshwant, which was released after his death. He appeared in Ramesh Sippy's film Saagar. Inamdar also directed a film titled Hum Dono, starring Nana Patekar, Rishi Kapoor and Pooja Bhatt. The film was a hit and he was considered a good director.

From his schooling days he was interested in dramas and used to act and direct school plays. He participated in elocution competition and debates. This continued through his college days and intensified his desire to become a performing artist and a theatre personality. He started his career as an actor and director under the guidance of Gujarati theatre personality Praveen Joshi. He directed and acted in about 30 one act plays in Hindi, Gujarati, Marathi and English from 1973 to 1978. Later he joined the Indian National Theatre and Indian People's Theatre Association where he met Balraj Sahni and other members of Indian Theatre and learned the finer aspects of acting.

The turning point in his career was Ismat Chugtai’s play Nila Kamra, which he staged as his first commercial production in Hindi. In the late seventies when the Prithvi Theatre was started Shafi Inamdar got an opportunity to produce several Hindi plays that paved the way for establishing him as a theatre personality to be reckoned with. He founded his own theatre group Hum Productions in 1982 and directed, produced and acted in various plays. He also staged comedies and folk theatre based on human drama, Naag Mandala.

In 1984 came India's most popular television sitcom Yeh Jo Hai Zindagi, a comedy serial starring Shafi Inamdar in the main lead as the character Ranjeet Verma, Swaroop Sampat played his wife Renu while Rakesh Bedi played his brother-in-law Raja. Shafi later acted in many other television serials like Adha Sach, Aadha Jooth, Mirza Ghalib and Teri Bhi Chup meri Bhi Chup. In 1983, he made first appearance on the Hindi screen in the Shashi Kapoor produced and Govind Nihalani directed film Vijeta, followed by the hard-hitting but popular Ardh Satya. He acted in B. R. Chopra films like Aaj Ki Awaaz (for which he also won a nomination in Filmfare award for Best Supporting Actor), Awaam and Dahleez, and became a regular with the B. R. film camp.

One of his most notable efforts comes from the film Krantiveer, in which he plays a TV anchor, a caricature of TV journalist Rajat Sharma of Aap Ki Adalat fame, and exposes a group of corrupted people regarding politics, law and police. His witty dialogues were appreciated. Krantiveer was one of the highest-grossing movies of 1994.

== Personal life ==
Shafi married actress Bhakti Barve, who died in a road accident on 12 February 2001.

Shafi died on 13 March 1996 following a massive heart attack while watching the India vs Sri Lanka 1996 Cricket World Cup semifinal match, which India lost. At the time, he was acting in the comedy show Teri Bhi Chup Meri Bhi Chup, which was shelved due to his death and All The Best in which his role was later played by Satish Shah.

== Filmography ==
Here is the updated table with the rowspan attributes applied to the Year column. This cleans up the visual repetition and makes the filmography much easier to read.

Shafi Inamdar Filmography

Year	Title	Role	Notes
1979	Ninaithale Inikkum		Tamil-Telugu film; uncredited
1982	Vijeta	Parulkar	
1983	Ardh Satya	Inspector Haider Ali	
1983	Ashray		
1984	Inquilaab	Inspector Pratap	
1984	Party	Ravi	
1984	Hip Hip Hurray	Football Match Refry	
1984	Aaj Ki Awaz	Inspector Shafi	
1984	Kamla	Jaspal ji (editor)	
1984	Arjun	Anand Patkar	
1985	Mahaguru	Shyam Kumar Talwari	
1985	Saagar	Vikram	
1985	Jaan Ki Baazi	Inspector Ranjeet Waghmare	
1986	Love 86	Ramniwas Tilak	
1986	Pahuche Huwey Log	Mohan	
1986	Kala Dhanda Goray Log	Advocate Abdul Rahim Khan	
1986	Amrit	Advocate Sharafat Ali	
1986	Sadaa Suhagan	Vinod	
1986	Anokha Rishta	Alex Lobo	
1986	Dahleez	Major General Khushal Singh	
1986	Jumbish: A Movement - The Movie	Shaitaan	
1986	Swarthi		
1986	Main Balwaan	Jailor	
1986	Insaaf Ki Awaaz	Sanyasi Raja	
1987	Ghar Ka Sukh		
1987	Nazrana	Shafi	
1987	Anjaam	Raj	
1987	Sansar	Albert Fernandes	
1987	Dacait	S. P. Srivastava	
1987	Awam	Mohanlal	
1987	Kudrat Ka Kanoon	Minister Chunautilal	
1988	Inaam Dus Hazaar	Karamat Khan	
1988	Tera Naam Mera Naam		
1988	Khatron Ke Khiladi	Inspector Ram Avatar	
1988	Agnee	Amit Foster Father	
1988	Aakhri Adaalat	D.S.P	
1988	Insaf Ki Jung		
1989	Socha Na Tha		
1989	Vardi	Shambhu	
1989	Abhimanyu	G.S. Parmeswaran	
1989	Dana Paani	Advocate Gautam Tripathi	
1989	Gola Barood	Jailor Sharma	
1989	Kala Bazaar	Sampta (Kamini's dad)	
1989	Ghar Ka Chiraag	Ravi's dad	
1989	Tujhe Nahin Chhodunga		
1989	Police Ke Peechhe Police		
1989	Hum Intezaar Karenge	Barrister Vikas Anand	
1990	Asli Haqdaar		
1990	Zahreelay	A.V. Raxdan	
1990	Izzatdaar	Prem Chand	
1990	C.I.D.	Police Inspector Faizaan	
1990	Ghayal	Barrister Pramod Saran Gupta	
1990	Jurm	Inspector Pramod Kadam	
1990	Sailaab	Police Inspector Haider Ali	
1990	Paap Ki Kamaee	Abu Bhai Gang Villain	
1990	Pratibandh	Corrupt Police Officer	
1990	Jai Shiv Shankar		
1990	Jaan-E-Wafa		
1990	Haar Jeet (1990 film)	Ajit	
1990	Andher Gardi	Police Commissioner	
1991	Yodha	Chandrakant Srivastav	
1991	Prem Qaidi	Jailor	
1991	Henna	Pak Police Superintendent Iqbal	
1991	Pratigyabadh	Lawyer S Merchant	
1991	Love	Maggie's father	
1991	Meet Mere Man Ke	Virendra	
1991	Phool Bane Angaray	Muralidhar	
1991	Narasimha	Inspector Vinod Rastogi	
1991	Maskari		
1991	Ghar Parivaar	Police Inspector	
1991	Fateh	Inspector Doshi	
1992	Sagale Sarkhech	Albert Pinto	
1992	Inteha Pyar Ki	Dr.Lall Jaiswal	
1992	Humlaa	Puthran Dada	
1992	Humshakal	Inspector Kulkarni	
1992	Sangeet	Yashraj Ahuja	
1992	Pyar Hua Chori Chori	Raja Saaheb	
1992	Naseebwaala	Shankar	
1992	Daulat Ki Jung	Mr Chaudhary (Rajesh's father)	
1993	Divya Shakti	Police Commissioner Anand Patkar	
1993	Hasti	Bhisham	
1993	Badi Bahen	Seth Dwarkaprasad	
1993	Yugandhar	Ballu	
1993	Sadhna	Dhaniram	
1993	Chahoonga Main Tujhe	Neelu's father	
1994	Janam Se Pehle	Dr.Verma	
1994	Insaniyat	Police Commissioner Shafi	
1994	Ishq Mein Jeena Ishq Mein Marna		
1994	Krantiveer	TV Interviewer	
1994	Ikke Pe Ikka	Iqbal Miya	
1995	Meri Mohabbat Mera Naseeba		
1995	Jeena Nahin Bin Tere		
1995	Faisla Main Karungi	Chandra	
1995	Takkar	DCP Mishra	
1995	Akele Hum Akele Tum	Kaushikji (music director)	
1995	Nishana	Vijay	
1995	Kis Kaam Ke Yeh Rishte		
1995	Ab Insaf Hoga	Ashok Mishra	
1995	Hum Dono		Director
1996	Hukumnama		
1996	Zordaar	ACP Sharma (Anju's dad)	
1996	Hahakaar	Inspector N.A. Pradhan	
1997	Anyay Hi Anyay		
1997	Yeshwant	Advocate Vikram	
1998	Barsaat Ki Raat		Final film role

== Television ==
Year	Title	Role	Notes
1984–1986	Yeh Jo Hai Zindagi	Ranjeet	
1986	Bahadur Shah Zafar (TV series)	Mirza Ghalib	Episode No 7
1987-1988	Aadha Sach Aadha Jooth		
1988	Mirza Ghalib	Mohammad Ibrahim Zauq	
1995-1996	Teri Bhi Chup Meri Bhi Chup	Ramakant	
1996	All the Best	Dr. Raj	
1996-1997	Biwi Toh Biwi Salla Re Salla	Dr. Raj Sethi	Episodes 1 - 16

== Awards and nominations ==
- 1986: Nominated: Filmfare Award for Best Supporting Actor for Aaj Ki Awaaz
