= Bhakti Barve =

Indian stage and movie actress

- Born: 10 September 1948; Sangli, Bombay Province, India
- Died: 12 February 2001 (aged 52); Bhatan, Maharashtra, India
- Other name: Bhakti Barve Inamdar
- Spouse: Shafi Inamdar

Bhakti Barve (10 September 1948 – 12 February 2001) was an Indian film, theatre and television actress in Marathi, Hindi and Gujarati. She is best known for the title role in the Marathi play Ti Phularani and for her role in Kundan Shah's comedy Jaane Bhi Do Yaaro (1983), where she acted alongside Naseeruddin Shah, Satish Shah and Ravi Baswani.

In theatre, which was her mainstay, she was associated with leading groups like Theatre Unit, Indian National Theatre, and Rangayan, and is remembered for performances in plays like Ti Phularani, Nag Mandala, Aayee Retire Hote Aahe and Hands Up. She was awarded the Sangeet Natak Akademi Award in Marathi theatre Acting in 1990 by India's National Academy of Music, Dance and Drama, apart from Maharashtra Gaurav Puraskar, and Abhinay Puraskar. She was married to actor Shafi Inamdar, who died in 1996.

== Personal life ==
Barve was born in Sangli, Maharashtra. During her school days she participated in Sudha Karmarkar's productions of children's theatre. She was married to late actor Shafi Inamdar.

== Career ==
Barve began her career by acting for Sudha Karmarkar's Little Theatre. She also had a short stint as announcer on All India Radio, Bombay and later as a news reader on Bombay Doordarshan (India's National broadcaster), and presenter of Saptahiki. While with Doordarshan, she also performed the role of Bahinabai Choudhary, the poetess-saint, in the critically acclaimed DD produced telefilm, Bahinabai.

She shot to fame with her performance in plays like the Marathi drama Ajab Nyaya Vartulacha ('Strange Justice of the Circle') in 1973, C. T. Khanolkar's adaptation of Brecht's Caucasian Chalk Circle, Mohan Rakesh's Adhe-adhure, Tee Phul Rani (Flower Queen) (1975), P.L. Deshpande's noted adaptation of G. B. Shaw's Pygmalion and by Jay Lerner's My Fair Lady. She was widely appreciated in 2 super hit Marathi stage plays, Hands-Up! (1982) and Ranga Mazha Vegala (1991), both co-starring Avinash Masurekar.

She acted in many TV serials and dramas, besides Hindi films, Kundan Shah's Jaane Bhi Do Yaaro (1983) and Govind Nihlani's Hazaar Chaurasi Ki Maa (1998). She was also the chairperson of the Akhil Bharatiya Marathi Natya Sammelan.

== Death ==
Barve performed a solo act, Pu La Fulrani Aani Mee, at Wai on 11 February 2001. The next morning at 02:45 IST, on her way back to Mumbai, her car driven by her driver rammed into the opening of Bhatan Tunnel on the Mumbai-Pune Expressway and she succumbed to her injuries.

== Awards ==
Bhakti Barve was honoured with a posthumous award at the Indian Telly Awards in 2001 for her contribution to Indian cinema and television.

== Filmography & Theatre ==
- Jaane Bhi Do Yaaro (1983)
- Hazaar Chaurasi Ki Maa (1998)
- Jannat Talkies
- Rishtey (TV series) – Episode: 68, (Season 3)
- Gharkul

== Theatre ==
- Tee Phulrani
- Thank You Mr. Glad
- Ajab Nyay Vartulacha
- Aai Retire Hotey
- Rang Mazaa Veglaa
- Gandhi Virudh Gandhi
- Akheracha Sawaal
- Double Game
- Kimayagar
- Damba Dweepcha Mukabla
- Naag Mandal
- Aadhe Adhure
- Hands Up
- Gandhi Viruddha Gandhi
- Bebii
