= Aaj Ki Awaaz =

1984 film by Ravi Chopra

Aaj Ki Awaz
- Directed by: Ravi Chopra
- Written by: Shabd Kumar
- Produced by: B. R. Chopra
- Starring: Raj Babbar; Smita Patil; Nana Patekar; Shafi Inamdar
- Cinematography: Barun Mukherjee
- Edited by: S. B. Mane
- Music by: Ravi
- Distributed by: B. R. Films
- Release date: 6 September 1984
- Running time: 137 minutes
- Country: India
- Language: Hindi
- Budget: ₹80 lakh
- Box office: ₹7.84 crore

Aaj Ki Awaz (transl. Voice of the day) is a 1984 Indian Hindi-language vigilante action film directed by Ravi Chopra and produced by B. R. Chopra. It stars Raj Babbar, Smita Patil, Nana Patekar and Shafi Inamdar. The film is based on 1982 American film Death Wish II. It tells the story of a professor who becomes a vigilante after his sister is raped and his mother is killed. This film was remade in Telugu as Nyayam Meere Cheppali (1985), in Tamil as Naan Sigappu Manithan (1985) and in Kannada as Mahatma (2000).

The film opened to positive response from critics and emerged a superhit at the box office. At the 32nd Filmfare Awards, Aaj Ki Awaz received six nominations, including Best Film (B. R. Chopra), Best Director (Ravi Chopra) Best Actor (Babbar), Best Actress (Patil), Best Supporting Actor (Inamdar) and Best Story (Kumar) and won for Best Lyricist (Kamal) for the title song. It is available for digital streaming on Amazon Prime Video.

== Plot ==
Professor Prabhat Kumar Varma (Raj Babbar) lives in Andheri, Mumbai with his widowed mother and sister, Madhu (Raksha Chauhan). Concerned about the rising crime rates in the city, he meets with Police Commissioner Sathe (Chandrashekhar) to voice his concerns. Meanwhile, his friend Professor Lalwani's sister-in-law, Sudha (Sonika Gill), is kidnapped, raped, and killed by Suresh Thakur (Dalip Tahil). However, Suresh's lawyers prove in court that he was not in Mumbai at the time of the incident, and he is acquitted. Frustrated by Prabhat's persistence in seeking justice for Sudha, Suresh and his gang break into Prabhat's apartment. They tie him up and sexually assault his sister in front of him before murdering his mother when she attempts to call the police. His sister subsequently commits suicide. Devastated by these events, Prabhat loses faith in the criminal justice system and becomes a vigilante, taking it upon himself to roam the city at night and kill rapists and murderers.

Inspector Shafi (Shafi Inamdar) begins to investigate these crimes, and Prabhat soon comes under the police's radar. The inspector eventually captures Prabhat, and his girlfriend Rajni (Smita Patil), who is a lawyer, takes it upon herself to free him and seek justice for his family once and for all.

== Cast ==
- Raj Babbar as Professor Prabhat Kumar Verma / Robinhood
- Smita Patil as Public Prosecutor Rajni Deshmukh
- Nana Patekar as Jagmohandas
- Om Shivpuri as Judge
- Dheeraj Kumar as Professor Lalwani
- Shafi Inamdar as Inspector Shafi
- Vijay Arora as Shrivastav
- Arun Bakshi as Inspector Veerkar
- Ashalata as Mrs. V.V. Deshmukh
- Chandrashekhar as Police Commissioner Sathe
- Iftekhar as Judge V.V. Deshmukh
- Aloknath as Bar Owner
- Gufi Paintal as Orderly in Mental Hospital
- Dalip Tahil as Suresh Thakur
- Dinesh Thakur as Advocate Dayal
- Chandni as Sudha's friend
- Deepak Qazir as Kishan Khanna
- Sonika Gill as Sudha Advani
- Urmila Bhatt as Mrs. Verma
- Raksha Chauhan as Madhu, Prof. Prabhat's sister who gets raped and killed.
- Om Katare as Villain
- Girija Shankar as Minister Sri Kanhaiya Laal Tomar

== Music ==
Song	Singer (s)
"Aaj Ki Awaz"	Mahendra Kapoor
"Dil Hi Dil Main"	Mahendra Kapoor
"Mera Chhota Sa Ghar"	Mahendra Kapoor
"Bharat To Hai Azad"	Mahendra Kapoor
"Mera Chhotasa Ghar" (sad)	Mahendra Kapoor
"Shloka"	Hemant Kumar
"Saare Jahan Se Achcha" (Note: Written by Muhammad Iqbal.)	Vijaya Majumdar

== Controversy ==
The censor certificate of the film shows "Re-revised", implying that censor board objected to certain scenes of the film, and cleared the movie when it was re-edited. The producers of the film have been subsequently criticized by many for filming sexual assault scenes in a gratuitous way.
