= Mridula Sinha =

Indian writer and politician (1942–2020)

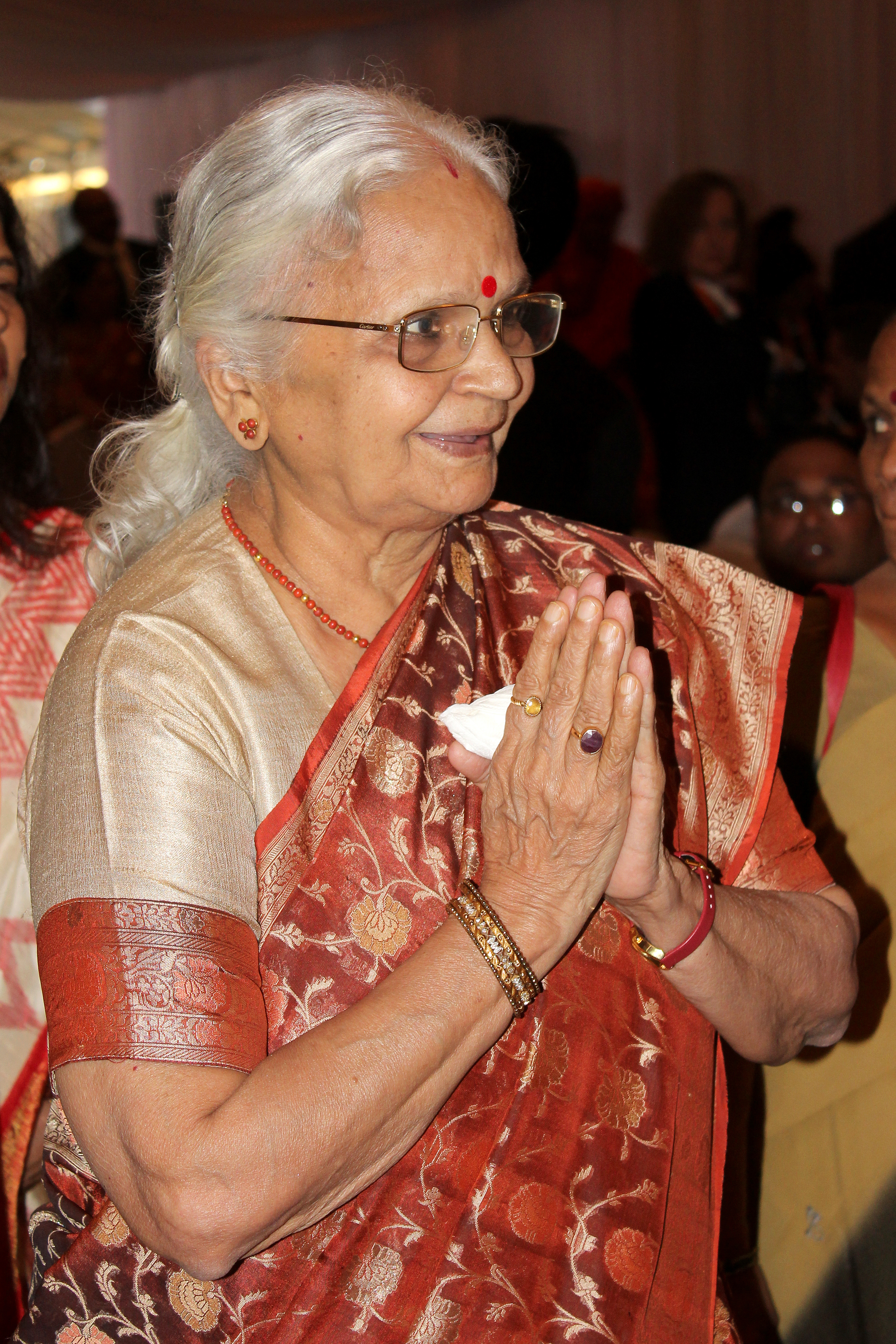

17th Governor of Goa
- In office 26 August 2014 – 23 October 2019
- Chief Minister: Manohar Parrikar; Laxmikant Parsekar; Pramod Sawant
- Preceded by: Om Prakash Kohli
- Succeeded by: Satya Pal Malik

Personal details
- Born: 27 November 1942 Muzaffarpur, Bihar, British India
- Died: 18 November 2020 (aged 77) Delhi, India
- Party: Bharatiya Janata Party
- Spouse: Ram Kripal Sinha

Mridula Sinha (27 November 1942 – 18 November 2020) was an Indian writer and politician who served as Governor of Goa from August 2014 to October 2019. She was the first woman Governor of Goa.

Mridula Sinha was also a former president of BJP Mahila Morcha. She was awarded India's fourth highest civilian award the Padma Shri posthumously in 2021.

== Early life ==
Mridula Sinha was born on 27 November 1942 in the village of Chhapra Dharampur Yadu in Muzaffarpur district in Mithila region of Bihar state in India. Her father was Babu Chhabile Singh and her mother was Anupa Devi. She attended the local school in Chhapra and later studied at Balika Vidyapeeth, a residential school for girls in Lakhisarai district.

Shortly before she completed her bachelor's degree, Mridula's parents arranged for her to marry Ram Kripal Sinha, who at that time was a college lecturer based in Muzaffarpur town, Bihar. After marriage, Mridula continued her studies and took a post-graduate degree in Psychology. She then took a job as a lecturer in the Dr. S.K. Sinha Women's College in Motihari. Shortly afterwards, her husband received his doctorate degree. She left the job and started a school in Muzaffarpur where her husband was working in a college.

== Career ==
Meanwhile, with encouragement from her husband, Mridula experimented with the short story format. She was interested in cultural matters and village traditions. She wrote short stories on these topics and on folk tales that she gathered from the villages where she and her husband worked. Many of these stories were published in Hindi language magazines and were later compiled into a two-volume anthology named Bihar ki lok-kathayen ("folk-tales of Bihar"). She also wrote several novels and a biography of Rajmata Vijayaraje Scindia titled Ek Thi Rani Aisi Bhi. A film of the same name was later made based on this book.

Mridula initially helped her husband in reaching out to the women of the constituency during his campaigns for election to the district committee. She found that with her knowledge of local tradition and cultural nuances, she had a strong connect with the people, especially women. She developed a very strong interest and commitment for social welfare, although she had no interest in electoral politics and never contested any election. She was named Chairperson of Central Social Welfare Board.

== Political career ==
At this time, her husband was a cabinet minister in the Bihar state government. She was, until August 2014, a member of the national executive of Bharatiya Janata Party. During the BJP's campaign for 2014 general elections, she was in charge of the BJP Mahila Morcha (women's wing). On 25 August 2014, she was appointed the Governor of Goa.

Sinha was also appointed an ambassador for the Swachh Bharat Abhiyan, by the Prime Minister of India Narendra Modi. During her tenure as Governor of Goa, she also adopted a cow and a calf at the Raj Bhavan for the purpose of daily worship.

== Literary contribution ==
- Ek thi rani aisi bhi (Short biography)
- Nayi devyani (Novel)
- Gharwaas (Novel)
- Jyon mehandi ko rang (Novel)
- Dekhan mein choten lagen (Stories)
- Sita puni boli (Novel)
- Yayavari ankhon se (Interviews)
- Bihar ki lok kathayen -I (Stories)
- Bihar ki lok kathayen-II (Stories)
- Dhai beegha zameen (Stories)
- Matr deh nahin hai aurat (Women liberation)
- Nari na kathputli na udanpari (2014) by Yash Publications, New Delhi
- Apna jivan (2014) by Yash Publications, New Delhi
- Antim ichha (2014) by Yash Publications, New Delhi
- Paritapt Lankeshwari (2015)
- Mujhe Kuch Kehna Hain (2015, Poetry) By Yash Publications, New Delhi
- Aaurat aaviksit purush nahi hain (2015) by Yash Publications, New Delhi
- chinta aur chintan ke inderdhanushyain rang by Mridula Sinha (2016) by Yash Publications, New Delhi
- India women new images on ancient foundation (2016) by Yash Publications, New Delhi
- ya nari sarvbuteshu (2016) by Yash Publications, New Delhi
- Relfications (2017) by Yash Publications, New Delhi
- Ek Sahitya Tirth Sw lauthkar (2017) By Yash Publications, New Delhi

Films & TV adaptation : Mridula Sinha's works such as the novel Jyon Mehendi Ko Rang has been adapted for a TV serial, with the short story "Dattak Pita" and the autobiography on Vijayaraje Scindia Rajpath se lok path par are made into feature films as Dattak and Ek thi Rani Aisi Bhi respectively. All her major literary works adapted for films and TV have been by the national award-winning film maker Gul Bahar Singh.

=== Translations into English ===
- Flames of Desire

=== Translations into Marathi ===
- Paritapt Lankeshwari, a translation by Rajashree Khandeparkar

== Honours ==
- Sinha received an honorary doctorate by the Babasaheb Bhimrao Ambedkar Bihar University in Muzaffarpur, Bihar.
- She was conferred with Acharya Tulsi Kartritva Puraskar in 2017 by Akhil Bhartiya Terapanth Mahila Mandal.

== See also ==
- List of Indian writers

Political offices
Preceded by Om Prakash Kohli; Additional Charge	Governor of Goa; 26 August 2014 - 2 November 2019	Succeeded by Satya Pal Malik
