= Nyayam Meere Cheppali =

- Poster
- Directed by: G. Rammohan Rao
- Written by: Acharya Aatreya
- Story by: Shabd Kumar
- Based on: Aaj Ki Awaaz (1984) by Ravi Chopra
- Produced by: Venkineni Satyanarayana
- Starring: Suman; Jayasudha; Rajnikanth
- Music by: K. Chakravarthy
- Release date: 8 February 1985
- Language: Telugu

Nyayam Meere Cheppali (transl. You deliver Justice) is a 1985 Telugu-language revenge vigilante film directed by G. Ram Mohan Rao. The film stars Suman and Jayasudha. The film was a remake of a Hindi film Aaj Ki Awaz (1984) which later remade in Tamil as Naan Sigappu Manithan by S. A. Chandrasekhar. Rajinikanth who made an extended guest appearance in this film, played the lead role in Tamil. This Telugu film was a hit at the box office.

== Cast ==
- Suman as Prabhakar, professor and Robin Hood, serial killer
- Jayasudha as Kranti, lawyer
- Rajinikanth as Inspector Atmaram (Guest appearance)
- Jaggayya as Judge
- M. Prabhakar Reddy as Sathyamurthy, Judge
- Kanta Rao as M. Bhaskara Rao, Police Commissioner
- Nutan Prasad as Mahanandam, Ministe.
- Eeswara Rao as Suresh, Prabhakar's colleague and friend
- Banerjee as Chidanandam
- Gulshan Grover as Dilip
- Jaya Bhaskar as Attendant in Hospital

== Soundtrack ==
All lyrics are written by Veturi.

No.	Title	Singer(s)	Length
1.	"Jeevanmaranam"	S. P. Balasubrahmanyam	04:03
2.	"Sangeetanivo Cheli Saahityanivo"	S. P. Balasubrahmanyam	04:09
3.	"Puvvula Puttillu"	S. P Balasubramaniam, S. P. Sailaja	03:29
4.	"Judam Jeevitam Oka Pandem"	S. P. Sailaja	03:51
5.	"Nyayam Meere Cheppali"	S. P. Balasubrahmanyam	03:53
