= Ek Se Badhkar Ek (2004 film) =

2004 film by Kundan Shah

- Theatrical release poster
- Directed by: Kundan Shah
- Written by: Dilip Shukla
- Produced by: Pammi Sandhu
- Starring: Suniel Shetty; Raveena Tandon; Shekhar Suman; Isha Koppikar
- Cinematography: Thomas A. Xavier
- Edited by: Aseem Sinha
- Music by: Anand Raj Anand
- Production company: Sai Trinetra Arts
- Distributed by: Ultra Films
- Release date: 17 September 2004
- Running time: 146 min
- Country: India
- Language: Hindi

Ek Se Badhkar Ek (transl. One better than the next) is a 2004 Hindi-language comedy film directed by Kundan Shah and stars Suniel Shetty and Raveena Tandon. The film was produced by Pammi Sandhu. The score and soundtrack were composed by Anand Raj Anand. The film was released on 17 September 2004.

== Plot ==
Advocate Anand Mathur draws up a will for his client, while reading the novel The Godfather, and erroneously makes out the will with a provision that the beneficiary must be a criminal Don in order to inherit the billions of rupees. The beneficiary is a bachelor named Rahul Bhargav, who wants no part of being a Don, criminal or anything of the sort. His police inspector girlfriend, Kanchan Dhillon, has set her sights on the billions and makes him change his mind. She assures him that she will use her influence and ensure that he gets to be the Don in no time at all, little realising that this will change their lives forever, and make them captives in neighbouring and hostile Pakistan.

== Cast ==
- Suniel Shetty as Rahul Bhargav
- Raveena Tandon as Insp. Kanchan Dhillon
- Shekhar Suman as Anand Mathur
- Isha Koppikar as Tracy D'Souza / Shalini Mathur
- Asrani as CBI Director Srikant Ramprasad Done
- Deepak Shirke as Deka
- Makrand Deshpande as Scientist Krishnamurthy
- Rana Jung Bahadur as Jaleel
- Sadashiv Amrapurkar as Inspector Inamdar
- Shakti Kapoor as Inspector Kaate
- Gulshan Grover as Jindaal
- Dinyar Contractor as Dastoor
- Achyut Potdar as Advocate Nadkarni
- Vivek Shauq as Khaleel

== Soundtrack ==
Songs
No.	Title	Lyrics	Music	Playback	Length
1.	"Aankhon Hi Aankhon Mein (I)"	Majrooh Sultanpuri	Anand Raj Anand	Kumar Sanu, Anuradha Sriram, Sunidhi Chauhan
2.	"Aankhon Hi Aankhon Mein (II)"	Majrooh Sultanpuri	Anand Raj Anand	Anuradha Sriram, Anand Raj Anand
3.	"Dheere Se Jaana"	Dev Kohli	Anand Raj Anand	Alka Yagnik, Babul Supriyo
4.	"Don Don"	Dev Kohli	Anand Raj Anand	Abhijeet, Sadhana Sargam
5.	"Meri Aankh Nashili"	Dev Kohli	Anand Raj Anand	Jaspinder Narula, Vinod Rathod
6.	"Phir Se"	Abbey	Abbey	Abbey
7.	"Tujhe Dekha Jab Se"	Dev Kohli	Anand Raj Anand	Abhijeet, Shweta Pandit, Sonu Nigam

== Reception ==
Chitra Mahesh of The Hindu wrote, "Bored? It might be a good idea to go and see Ek Se Badhkar Ek. Because that is the only way you would be motivated to see it." Taran Adarsh of Bollywood Hungama gave the film 1.5 stars out of 5, writing "On the whole, Ek Se Badhkar Ek is no Number Ek entertainer. It falls short of expectations and at best, might appeal to a small segment of audience in metros mainly." Patcy N of Rediff.com wrote, ″Though he tried more than once in his new film, Kundan Shah couldn't create the magic of his debut Jaane Bhi Do Yaaron in Ek Se Badhkar Ek.″
