= Meenakshi Dixit =

Indian actress

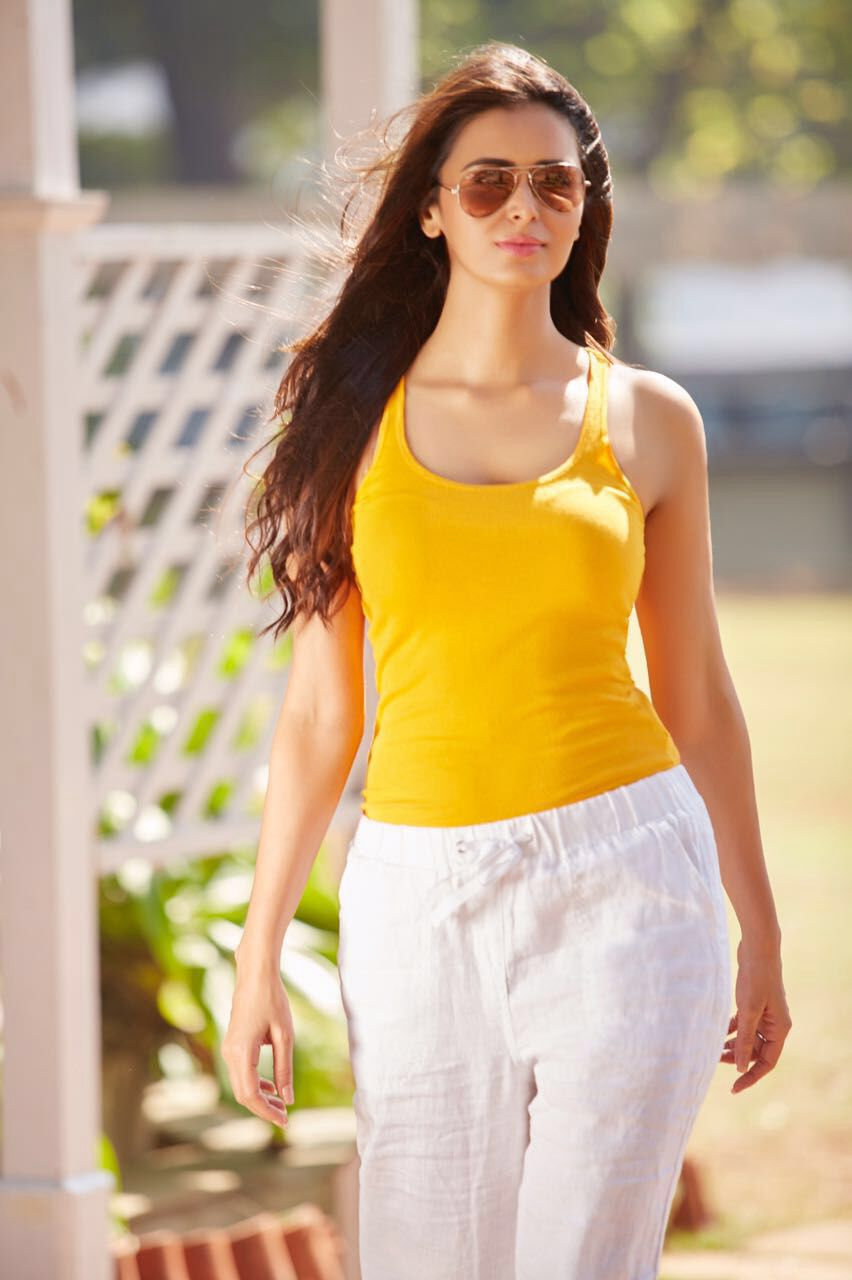
- Born: Raebareli, Uttar Pradesh, India
- Education: Kanpur University
- Occupation: Actress
- Years active: 2008 – Present
- Parent(s): Ishwar Chandra Dixit; Geeta Dixit
- Website: meenakshidixit.com

Meenakshi Dixit is an Indian actress who has worked in Telugu, Tamil, Hindi, Malayalam and Kannada films.

== Background ==
Meenakshi Dixit was born in Raebareli, Uttar Pradesh. She is the daughter of Ishwar Chandra Dixit, a senior lawyer in Civil Court in Raebareli, and Geeta Dixit. She graduated with a Bachelor of Science in Botany, Zoology, and Chemistry. She has trained in Kathak and western dance.

== Career ==
In 2008 Meenakshi Dixit appeared as a contestant in NDTV Imagine's dance reality show Nachle Ve with Saroj Khan hosted by Saroj Khan, which led to her entry into the Indian film industry. She first appeared in a Telugu film, Lifestyle. Later on, she got into modelling, endorsing local and international brands such as Joyalukkas Jewelry, Microsoft Windows, Fair and Handsome cream, Chennai Silks, Shankaram diamond jewellery, Brook Bond Taza tea, Paaneri Sarees, Lee Cooper, Red Square Energy Drink, Radio Mirchi, ESSAR, Anytime Fitness gym and Aquagaurd. She has also been a regular model for the fashion industry, as well as in prominent Indian magazines.

In 2011, she made a special appearance in a dance number in Dookudu, the year's highest grossing Telugu film. Following Dookudu, she was also chosen by the producers of the Bodyguard remake to do a dance number, hoping that it would repeat the success of her number in Dookudu. She also performed an item number in the Tamil film Billa II, considered to be one of her biggest project to be done yet. In 2014 she was seen in lead roles in two films. She played the role of a princess in the Tamil period-comedy Tenaliraman while the thriller-drama Adavi Kachina Vennela saw her playing an aspiring sharp shooter, with the actress also performing stunts in the film.

She was introduced in Bollywood by National Award Winner director Kundan shah's P Se PM Tak in 2015. She played a feisty prostitute who finds herself in the Chief Minister's chair and then in the run to become the Prime Minister of the country. Filmmaker Kundan Shah said "She is photogenic and also a talented actress". She was next seen in Laal Rang in 2016 as Randeep Hooda's onscreen love interest where she plays the role of a medical student.

Her last Tamil film was Bayam Oru Payanam (2016). She next played the role of Nidhi in the 2019 Telugu film Maharshi.

== Filmography ==
Key
†	Denotes films that have not yet been released

=== Film ===
Year	Title	Role	Language	Notes
2009	Lifestyle	Anjali	Telugu	
2010	Alexander the Great	Bismitha	Malayalam	
2011	Dookudu	Herself	Telugu	"Nee Dookudu" song
2012	Bodyguard	Guest appearance	Telugu	"Body Guard" song
2012	Billa II	Herself	Tamil	"Madurai Ponnu" song
2012	Devaraya	Sunandha	Telugu	
2013	Baadshah	Special appearance	Telugu	Baadshah title track
2014	Tenaliraman	Princess Maadhulai	Tamil	
2014	Adavi Kaachina Vennela	Vennela	Telugu	
2015	En Vazhi Thani Vazhi	Priya	Tamil	
2015	P Se PM Tak	Kasturi	Hindi	
2016	Bayam Oru Payanam	Annu	Tamil	
2016	Laal Rang	Rashi	Hindi	
2018	Lupt	Tanu Tandon	Hindi	
2019	Maharshi	Nidhi	Telugu	
2021	Babu Marley	Shanthi	Kannada	
2021	Tamil Rockers		Tamil	
2022	Bangarraju	Apsara	Telugu	Cameo appearance
2022	Local Train	Kushi	Kannada	

=== Television ===
Year	Title	Role	Notes
2008	Nachle Ve with Saroj Khan	Herself	Runner-up; Credited in the show as Meenakshi Dixit

=== Music videos ===
Year	Title	Co-star	Notes
2012	Chuloon Aasman		Hindi
2017	Kadhile Kaalam Kalala	Anirudh Sameer	Telugu

== Awards ==
Year	Title	Notes
2017	Uttar Pradesh Gaurav Samman	Received from Governor of UP Shri Ram Naik & Deputy CM Shri Dinesh Sharma
2017	10 Global Film Festival – Hindi Cinema Samman Samaroh	Received from Jackie Shroff & Sandeep Marwah
2017	Marvellous Personality Of India	Received from Governor of UP Shri Ram Naik & Cabinet Minister Rita Bahuguna
2018	Entertainment Award	Presented by Gurujee Kumaran Swami in Bahrain
2018	Uttar Pradesh Gaurav Samman	Received from Home Minister of India Shri Rajnath Singh
