= The Goal (1999 film) =

- Directed by: Gul Bahar Singh
- Written by: Deeya Roy
- Screenplay by: Partha Banerjee; Subir Mukherjee
- Story by: Prafulla Roy
- Starring: Irrfan Khan
- Cinematography: Aryan Kanakia
- Edited by: Ujjal Nandy
- Music by: Chandan Roy Chaudhury
- Production company: Children's Film Society, India
- Release date: 30 December 1999
- Running time: 1 hour 30 minutes
- Country: India
- Language: Hindi

The Goal is a Hindi drama film based on the short story written by Bengali writer Prafulla Roy, released In 1999 produced by Children's Film Society, India and directed by Gul Bahar Singh starring Irrfan Khan as a coach. The film has won several national and international awards. The movie was shot in many parts of Batanagar thereby the craze of people during this movie's shooting time was unmatchable, as many of people there love playing Football more than anything. This was his first movie that being shot in West Bengal with many other Bengali actors in lead.

== Plot ==
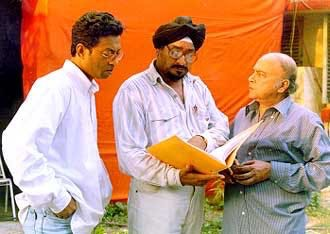

The film is about a child Manu (Tapas Dhali) who belongs to a poor family and loves to play football but no one accepts him to play in their team because of his family background however Anupam is a football coach (Irrfan Khan) finds Manu talented and decides to coach him. After spending some time coaching Manu, coach Anupam thinks that Manu is eligible and decides to play him in a semifinal match for his club but other players and their parents declined to play with Manu because his father is a thief and he belongs to a lower caste. Anupam finds himself helpless and doesn't want such a talent to die so he puts Manu in the rival team to play against his own club.

== Cast ==
- Abhinav Ben
- Punya Darshan Gupta
- Irrfan Khan
- Girish Mathur
- Manoj Mitra
- Anandita Saha
- Sanjay Sharma
- Manjula Singh
- Abhishek Singha

== Awards ==
- 2000, Best Children's Film at 47th National Film Awards, India.
- 2001, Special International Jury Prize at 11th Cairo International Film Festival Egypt.
- 2001, Special Mention at Zlin International Federation of Film Societies.
- 2001, Selected in Indian Panorama.
- Participated in International Children film festival, Hyderabad
