= Bayam Oru Payanam =

2016 Indian film by RR Mani Sharma

- Theatrical release poster
- Directed by: RR Mani Sharma
- Produced by: S. Durai; S. Shanmugam
- Starring: Bharath Reddy; Vishakha Singh; Meenakshi Dixit
- Cinematography: I. Andrew
- Edited by: L. V. K. Dass Daniel
- Music by: Y. R. Prasad
- Production company: Octo Spider Productions
- Release date: 25 August 2016
- Country: India
- Language: Tamil

Bayam Oru Payanam (transl. Fear is a journey) is a 2016 Indian Tamil-language horror film written and directed by Manisharma. The film features Bharath Reddy, Vishakha Singh and Meenakshi Dixit in the leading roles, while Urvashi, Singampuli, and Yogi Babu play supporting roles. Featuring music composed by YR Prasad, production for the film began in mid-2015. The film was released on 25 August 2016 in India.

== Cast ==
- Bharath Reddy as Ram
- Vishakha Singh as Abhinaya
- Meenakshi Dixit as Annu
- Urvashi
- Singampuli as Kavariman
- Yogi Babu as Watchman
- Jangiri Madhumitha
- King Kong
- Lollu Sabha Manohar
- Dinesh Sharavana
- John Vijay

== Production ==
Manisharma began Bayam Oru Payanam during mid-2015 and revealed that the film was "almost complete" by October 2015. Vishakha Singh, Bharath Reddy and Meenakshi Dixit were announced to be playing the lead roles in the film, with the makers describing it as a "female-orientated, horror film". The team shot a twenty-day schedule in Munnar during late December 2015, with Vishakha Singh portraying a ghost in her scenes. According to Vishakha Singh, the film was shot for 19 to 21 hours a day. Leeches were an issue during filming and a lot of the cast and crew encountered leech bites, except for her since she used eucalyptus oil and salt to prevent them.

== Soundtrack ==
The music was composed by Y. R. Prasad.

- "Yaaradhu Yaaradhu" - Renjith Unni, Aravind Sreenivas
- "Maayavi Penne" - Haricharan, Saindhavi
- "Aagasam Ponavarey" - M. L. R. Karthikeyan, Y. R. Prasad
- "Wish You A Happy New Year" - Ranjith, Gana Bala, Rita
