= Dattak =

2001 film by Gul Bahar Singh

- Directed by: Gul Bahar Singh
- Written by: Partha Banerjee; Subbir Mukherjee
- Produced by: NFDC
- Starring: Rajit Kapoor; Anjan Srivastav; A.K. Hangal
- Cinematography: Sunirmal Mazumdar
- Edited by: Ujjal Nandi
- Release date: 2001
- Running time: 125 minutes
- Language: Hindi

Dattak (The Adopted) is a 2001 Hindi film directed by Gul Bahar Singh with Rajit Kapoor, Anjan Srivastav and A.K. Hangal in the lead roles. The film was in competition at the 5th Shanghai International Film Festival, China and was also screened at the 20th Fazr International Film Festival, Tehran (Iran). It was recently shown in IFFI, Goa.

== Plot ==
Sunil is married to an American girl. His father lives in Kolkata with an old servant, Shambhu. When Sunil returns home after fifteen years, he sees the house is locked and his father has disappeared. Guilt-ridden Sunil starts looking for him. He learns that his father might be in an old age home. He reaches there only to find that he had died a few months earlier. Sunil meets Satya Babu, his father's fellow inmate, who tells him all about his father's last days. Sunil tells the old man that he wants to adopt him as his father and requests him to come to the US with him.

== Cast ==
Actor/actress	Role
Rajit Kapur	Sunil
A.K. Hangal	Satya Babu
Anjan Srivastav	Sunil's father
Kruttika Desai	
