= Aanjjan Srivastav =

Indian actor (Born: 1948)

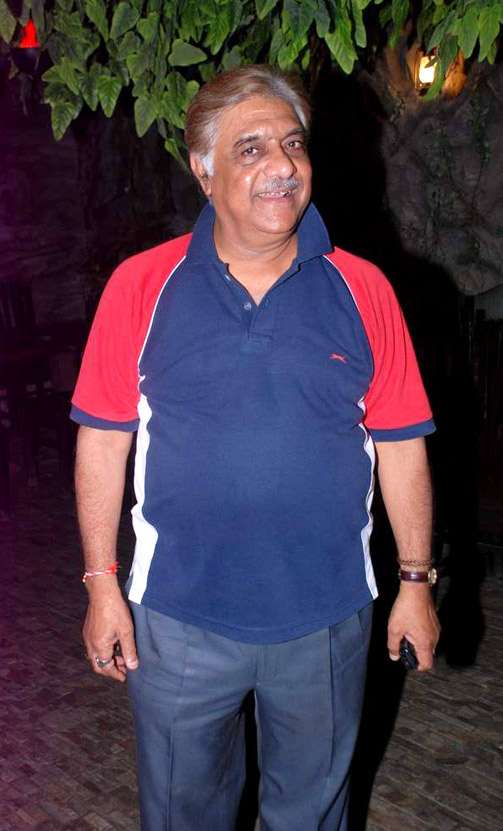
- Srivastav in 2012
- Born: Anjan Srivastav; 2 June 1948 (age 78); Calcutta, West Bengal, India
- Occupation: Actor
- Years active: 1976–present
- Spouse: Madhu Srivastav

Aanjjan Srivastav (born 2 June 1948) is an Indian film, television and stage actor, associated with Indian People's Theatre Association (IPTA) in Mumbai of which he remained Vice-President for several years. Outside theatre, he is best known as a character actor in Marathi and Hindi films, most notably, Mira Nair's Salaam Bombay!, Mississippi Masala, and Anupam Mittal's Flavors and Bollywood films like Gol Maal, Bemisal, Khuda Gawah, Kabhi Haan Kabhi Naa, and Pukar. He has also acted in the TV shows Wagle Ki Duniya (1988) and Wagle Ki Duniya – Nayi Peedhi Naye Kissey (2021).

On television, Srivastav made his mark as the quintessential "common man" in the TV series Wagle Ki Duniya (Wagle's World) (1988–90) and Wagle Ki Nayi Duniya, where he played the lead role, apart from Yeh Jo Hai Zindagi (1984) and Nukkad. He has also acted for more than 40 years in over 30 plays, many of them jubilee hits, including Bakri, Moteram Ka Satyagrah, Shatranj Ke Mohre, Ek Aur Dronacharya, and Chakkar Pe Chakkar. One of his serials is Bharat Ek Khoj, based upon Jawaharlal Nehru's Discovery of India, wherein he played various roles.

== Early life and education ==
He was born and brought up in Calcutta (now Kolkata), into a family from Uttar Pradesh and his father was a banker with Allahabad Bank. Anjan did his B.Com. and LLB from Calcutta University, it was here that he started taking part in local Hindi and Bengali theatre groups in 1968, and did plays for All India Radio. Meanwhile, he also did a small role in the film Chameli Mem Shaeb. Soon he acted with noted groups in the city like Kala Bhavan, Sangeet Kala Mandir and Adakar and acted in a few Bengali films.

== Career ==
As per his fathers wishes, he joined the Allahabad Bank, and continued acting in plays on the side. It was only after the death of his sister in 1976 that his father relented and allowed him get transferred to Bombay (now Mumbai) to pursue his acting career further.

Upon arrival, he immediately joined Indian People's Theatre Association (IPTA) and worked in its several productions, and remained with it ever since, after staying its General Secretary of IPTA for a while, he went on to become the Vice-President. He also worked with Prithvi Theatre in the city.

Anjan started his career with Bengali plays like Neel Darpan, Kayakalp and Anwar around the year 1967. In Mumbai, with Indian People's Theatre Association (IPTA), he contributed to several plays including the most renowned Safaid Kundali (The Caucassion chalk circle) by M. S. Sathyu and other Stage plays in the social category with association of the same theatre group. Theatre led to film roles like in Kundan Shah's Saza-E-Maut, Hrishikesh Mukherjee's comedy classic, Gol Maal (1979) and JP Dutta's Ghulami (1985). Then he moved in Television with Yeh Jo Hai Zindagi and went on act in notable TV series like Manoranjan, Tamas, by Govind Nihlani, Nukkad and Katha Sagar, finally in 1987, he received the lead in comedy series, Wagle Ki Duniya, based on R.K. Laxman's common man, which brought him his place in the limelight. He also acted in Shyam Benegal's epic series, Discovery of India.

He often plays skeptical bureaucratic roles, sometimes the conventional narrow-minded father character, and as the veteran actor who effectively enacted the troubles and ways of life of a common-middle-class man in Wagle Ki Duniya, a creation by known cartoonist R.K. Laxman and director Kundan Shah. He has acted in over 127 Hindi films including Kabhi Haan Kabhi Naa, as head hockey official, Mr. Tripathi in Chak De! India, and in other films like Raju Ban Gaya Gentleman and No Entry and many other characters in various films. In 2005, he played the lead in M.S. Sathyu's production Raat, written by Javed Siddiqui and based on Ariel Dorfman's play Death and the Maiden. Other plays Anjan continues to do include Moteram Ka Satyagrah, directed by M. S. Sathyu, based on the writings of Munshi Premchand and Safdar Hashmi and Kashmakash, directed by Ramesh Talwar. These plays mostly run at Prithvi Theatre, Mysore Association-Sion, TejPal Auditorium. Anjan's Moteram Ka Satyagrah and Shatranj Ke Mohre are some plays which have been running now for more than 20 years.

All through his acting career, he remained a bank employee from where he later retired in 2001.

== Theatre shows ==
Year	Play	Direction	Language
1967–1978	Kayakalp	Sushila Mishra	Bengali
1967–1978	Baati Ghar	Bijon Chatterjee	Bengali
1967–1978	The Chinese Wall	Sushila Mishra	Bengali
1967–1978	All My Sons	Sushila Mishra - Arthur Miller's	Bengali
1967–1978	Neel Darpan (Bengali)	Jnanesh Mukherjee - Bandhu Mitra's	Bengali
1967–1978	Aashad Ka Ek Din	Badri Prasad Tewary - Mohan Rakesh's	Bengali
1967–1978	Chakkar pe Chakkar	Rajendra Sharma	Bengali
1967–1978	Kachwa Aur Khargosh	Rajendra Sharma	Bengali
1967–1978	Aasman Se Gira	Rajendra Sharma	Bengali
1967–1978	Kisi Ek Phool Ka Naam Lo	Rajendra Sharma	Bengali
1967–1978	Barf Ki Minar	Rajendra Sharma	Bengali
1967–1978	Ek Aur Dronachaarya	Badri Prasad Tiwari	Bengali
1967–1978	The Good Woman of Setzuan	Shyamaland Jalan - Brecht's	Bengali
1978–present	The Ghost (Ateet Ki Parchaaiyan)	R. M. Singh - Ibsen's	Hindi
2000	Bakri	M. S. Sathyu - Saxena's	Hindi
1978	Hum Farishtey Nahin	Javed Khan	Hindi
1979	Aap Kaun Hai, Kya Karte Hai, Kya Karna Chahte Hai	Baasu Bhattacharya	(adaptation)
	Hori	Kamlakar Sontake	Hindi
1979–1980	The Caucassion chalk circle as Sufaid Kundali	M. S. Sathyu - Brecht's	Hindi
1980	Dande Ka Ghoda	M. S. Sathyu- Brecht's	Hindi
	Dekha Andekha	Ashok Lal	Hindi
1983	Lok Katha	Ramesh Talwar	Hindi
1983	Rakshas	M. S. Sathyu	Hindi
1985	Ek Aur Dronacharya	S. Dangayach - Dr. Shankar Shesh's	Hindi
1984	The Dragon as Rakshas	M. S. Sathyu	Hindi
1986	Rajdarshan	Waman Kendre	Hindi
1987	Saiyyan Bhaye Kotwal	Waman Kendre	Hindi
1989–90	Moteram Ka Satyagraha	M. S. Sathyu - Premchand's	Hindi
1989	Aakhri Peshi	Jaspal Sandhu	Hindi
1991–92	Temp Me Not	Waman Kendre	Hindi
1999	Shatranj Ke Mohre	Ramesh Talwar - P. L. Deshpande's	Hindi
1999	Ek Mamooli Aadmi	Raman Kumar - Akiru Kurusawa's Ikiru	Hindi
2000	Kurukshetra Se Kargil Tak	M. S. Sathyu - K. V. Puttappa	Hindi
2001	Surya Ke Waris	Jaydev Hattangady	Hindi
2002	Tajmahal Ka Tender	Salim Arif	Hindi
2002	Aakhri Shama	M. S. Sathyu - Kaifi Azmi's	Urdu
2002	Raat (Based on 1994 Mystery Death & the Maiden)	M. S. Sathyu - Javed Siddiqui	Hindi
2002	Doodh King	Jha	Hindi
2004	Kashmakash (Based on Bengali Play Tamrapatra)	Ramesh Talwar	Hindi/ Bengali
2007	Orange Juice		Hindi
2007	Hum Deewane Hum Parwane	Ramesh Talwar	Hindi/Urdu
2013	Darindey: The Villains	Ramesh Talwar	Hindi
2012–13	Rishton Ka Live Telecast	Prasad Khandekar (Non IPTA production)	Hindi
2017	Ek Aur Dronacharya (Revived)	S. Dangayach - Dr. Shankar Shesh's	Hindi
2017	Ek Mamuli Aadmi (Revived)	Raman Kumar (AShok Lal)	Hindi
2017	Bakri (revived)	M. S. Sathyu	Hindi

== Selected television shows ==
- Yeh Jo Hai Zindagi (1984)
- Nukkad (1986–1988)
- Bharat Ek Khoj (1988)
- Wagle Ki Duniya (1988–1990) as Srinivas Wagle
- Naya Nukkad (1993–1994)
- Paltan (1997)
- Alpviram (1998) as Amrita's grandfather
- Bhanwar (1998–1999)
- Woh Rehne Waali Mehlon Ki (2005)
- Virrudh (2007–2008) as Pandeyji
- Mrs. & Mr. Sharma Allahabadwale (2010) as Sarveshwarprasad Mukteshwarprasad Sharma
- Na Bole Tum... Na Maine Kuch Kaha (2012) as Vedkant Vyas
- Samvidhaan (2014) as Pandit Balkrishna Sharma
- Chandrashekhar (2018) as Lala Lajpat Rai
- Out of Love (2019–2021) as Dr Pradhan
- Wagle Ki Duniya – Nayi Peedhi Naye Kissey (2021–2025) as Srinivas Wagle
- Operation Safed Sagar as Prime Minister Atal Bihari Vajpayee

== Selected filmography ==
=== Hindi films ===
- Gol Maal (1979) - Inspector
- Sazaye Maut (1981)
- Kaalia (1981) ... Constable in central jail
- Aagaman (1982)
- Bemisal (1982) - Doctor
- Saath Saath (1982) - Dr. B.M. Acharya
- Lorie (1984)
- Vivek (film) (1985)
- Ghulami (1985)
- Jawaab (1985) - Mehta (Journalist)
- Loha (1987) - Champaklal
- Mr India (1987) - Baburam
- Kaash (1987)
- Aakhri Adalat (1988) - Dr. Abdul Rehman
- Shahenshah (1988)- Mr. Pathak
- Salaam Bombay! (1988) - Psychic Superintendent
- Dayavan (1988) - S.P. Raghavan
- Abhi To Main Jawan Hoon (1989)
- Main Azaad Hoon (1989) - Rastogi
- Awwal Number (1990) - Cricket Commentator
- Agneepath (1990)
- Yodha (1991) - Mantri
- Narasimha (1991) - Narasimha's dad
- Mississippi Masala (1991) - Jammubhai
- Khuda Gawah (1992) - Kamaljit
- Jo Jeeta Wohi Sikandar (1992) - Race commentator
- Chamatkar (1992) - Tripathi-Inspector/commissioner
- Ghar Jamai (1992) - Gopaldas
- Isi Ka Naam Zindagi (1992) - Doctor
- Dil Hi To Hai (1992 film) - Minister
- Raju Ban Gaya Gentleman (1992) - Saxena
- Roop Ki Rani Choron Ka Raja (1993)- Mr. Narang
- Damini - Lightning (1993) - Chandrakant (Damini's dad)
- Dilwale (1994)
- Kabhi Haan Kabhi Naa (1994) - Vinayak
- Ghatak: Lethal (1996) - Dhamu Kaka
- Gupt: The Hidden Truth (1997) - Commissioner Patwardhan
- Sanam (1997)
- China Gate (1998) - Pandey/DK
- Pyaar To Hona Hi Tha (1998) - Shekhar's Father
- Bandhan (1998)
- Pukar (2000)
- Dattak (2001)
- Little John (2001)
- Pyaar Ishq Aur Mohabbat (2001)
- Lajja (2001)
- Durga (2002) - Gayatri's Father
- Shararat (2002)
- Stumped (2003)
- Flavors (2003)
- Run (2004)
- Aan: Men at Work (2004)
- Vaada (2005)
- Chak De! India (2007) - Mr. Tripathi
- Halla Bol (2008) - Amanullah Khan
- Flavors (2004) - Mr. Gopalkrishna
- What's Your Raashee? (2009) - Bharatbhai Patel
- Yuvvraaj (2008) - Om Mama ji
- Mittal v/s Mittal (2010) - Mitali's Father
- Paathshaala (2010) as Waghmare
- Tees Maar Khan (2010)
- Arjun: The Warrior Prince (2012) - (Animation) Lord Shiva
- P Se PM Tak (2014)
- Jab Harry Met Sejal (2017)
- Amma (2017)
- Ek Thi Rani Aisi Bhi (2017)
- Firangi (2017)
- Sanju (2018)
- Junction Varanasi (2018)
- PM Narendra Modi (2019)
- Chandigarh Kare Aashiqui (2021)
- Sam Bahadur (2023)
- Murderbaad (2025)

=== Other language films ===
- Chakravyuh (2000) (Bengali)
- Dr. Babasaheb Ambedkar (2000) (English) - Sayajirao Gaekwad III
- Suri (2000) (Telugu)
- Little John (2001) (English)
- Nishani Dava Angatha (2009) (Marathi)
- SEZ (2014) (Marathi)
- Ek Nadir Galpo: Tale of a River (2014) (Bengali)
