= Ek Thi Rani Aisi Bhi =

- Directed by: Gul Bahar Singh
- Written by: Mridula Sinha
- Based on: Ek Thi Rani Aisi Bhi by Mridula Sinha
- Produced by: Rajmata Vijayaraje Scindia Smirit Trust
- Starring: Hema Malini; Vinod Khanna; Sachin Khedekar; Rajesh Shringarpure; Anjan Srivastav
- Music by: Chandan roy Chaudhury & Hirju Roy
- Release date: 21 April 2017
- Running time: 125 minutes
- Country: India
- Language: Hindi

Ek Thi Rani Aisi Bhi (transl. Once there was a queen) is a 2017 Hindi language biopic directed by Gul Bahar Singh starring Hema Malini, who portrays Vijaya Raje Scindia. The film is based on Mridula Sinha's biography novel Rajpath se Lokhpath par, and traces her journey from Palace to the public. Vinod Khanna is portrayed as Jivajirao Scindia of Gwalior. The film was completed in 2008 but its release was delayed for years. It eventually released in theatres on 21 April 2017, and premiered to television on Zee Classic on 6 May 2017. The film was shown in the 49th International Film Festival of India in Goa.

== Plot ==
Ek Thi Rani Aisi Bhi is a story of conflict between righteousness and autocracy, between modesty and pride, between idealism and opportunism. It is the saga of the king who loved his people and died of a broken heart when separated from them. It is the legend of the queen who never compromised with her faith and became the mother of millions of propagating love. The merger of the princely states with the Indian Union after Independence had left several kings and queens disheartened. Especially when those monarchs considered their subjects as their own children and whose objective was to improve the lot of the people. It was a difficult situation to cope with.

Maharaja Jivajirao Scindia of Gwalior was one of those unfortunate monarchs. He died prematurely, leaving his wife, Vijaya Raje Scindia, at the mercy of a political party. She struggled hard but, in the process, lost her son in the war of ideology. She was never reconciled to the fact that her son would join hands with those who brought hardship to the people. It was the beginning of the end of a relationship between a mother and her son. It was a difficult situation for the mother. But she had never bowed down to those forces and went her own way. It was a road that finally led to the triumph of truth, faith, and human values.

== Cast ==
- Hema Malini as Vijaya Raje Scindia
- Vinod Khanna as Jiwajirao Scindia
- Sachin Khedekar as ADC
- Rajesh Shringarpure as Madhavrao Scindia
- Priyanshi Mane as Vijaya's Daughter
