= Yeh Jo Hai Zindagi =

Indian sitcom series

- Screenshot with the title Yeh Jo Hai Zindagi in Hindi
- Genre: Sitcom
- Written by: Sharad Joshi
- Directed by: Manjul Sinha; Kundan Shah; Raman Kumar
- Opening theme: "Yeh Jo Hai Zindagi" by Kishore Kumar
- Country of origin: India
- Original language: Hindi
- No. of seasons: 3
- No. of episodes: 67

Production
- Producer: S. S. Oberoi
- Camera setup: Single camera
- Running time: 25 minutes
- Production company: Oberoi Films

Original release
- Network: DD National
- Release: 1984

Yeh Jo Hai Zindagi (literal meaning: 'Such is Life') is a sitcom that aired on DD National in 1984. It was written by comedy writer Sharad Joshi and directed by Kundan Shah, S. S. Oberoi and Raman Kumar.

== Plot ==
The episodes revolved around funny happenings in the lives of Ranjit Verma and Renu Verma, who play a married couple along with Renu's unmarried and unemployed younger brother Raja and then Chachi's daughter who plays the character of Rashmi. Other characters were Ranjit's boss, his Bengali neighbours.

== Cast ==
=== Main ===
- Shafi Inamdar as Ranjit Verma, the husband
- Swaroop Sampat as Renu Verma, Ranjit's wife
- Rakesh Bedi as Raja, Renu's brother
- Satish Shah as different character in each episode.
- Sulbha Arya as Mandira Bhattacharya, Bengali neighbour
- Vijay Kashyap as Tarun Bhattacharya, Bengali neighbour (season1–2);

=== Recurring ===
- Aanjjan Srivastav as Various characters
- Jatin Kanakia as Rekha's Uncle
- Pavan Malhotra as Various characters
- Kishori Ballal as Groom's Mother
- Avtar Gill as Various characters
- Amrit Pal as Manager in Episode 2 Sofa Cum Bed
- Salim Ghouse as Mr Venkat
- Rekha Sabnis as Mrs Venkat
- Ravi, Raja's Brother-in-law (season 3)
- Tiku Talsania as Raghuwan Kailash Gupta a.k.a. R.K. Gupta, Ranjit's boss and later Raja's father in law.
- Farida Jalal as Ranjit's aunt (season 2)
- Javed Khan Amrohi as Jhumru the servant (season 2)
- Reena Wadhwa as Rashmi, the daughter of Ranjit's Aunt (season 2)
- Nivedita Joshi-Saraf as Rekha, Raja's Wife (season 3)
- Kiran Juneja as Ranjana, Ravi's Girlfriend (season 3)

== Production ==
The first 24 episodes of the show has focus on Ranjit, Renu and Raja and their neighbours Mr. Bhattacharya and Mandira, with various characters played by Satish Shah.

Shafi Inamdar (who played Ranjit) left after Episode 24 due to his film commitments. Episode 25 to 44 had focus on Raja, his aunt and her servant.

Ranjit and Renu return from Episode 45 onwards and act till Episode 55 of Raja’s marriage with Rekha. The characters played by Satish Shah were constant factor from Episode 1 to 55. The second season retained the fame of the first season. Raja's love life and affair with Rekha (Nivedita) was the new center of activity. The third innings had a reasonably shorter run from episode 55 to 67. It focused on the household life of Mr Gupta, Raja and Rekha after marriage.

The alumni of this show went on to have chequered careers in Indian and other cinema over the years. In few episodes from 40, Anjan Srivastav, Avtaar Gill, Pawan Malhotra, Ashok Pandit played different characters.

== List of episodes ==
Episode	Title	Role played by Satish Shah	Description
1	The Divorce	Lawyer on his first day of practice	Renu wants to see if Ranjit remembers their anniversary. Ranjit overhears Renu but pretends to forget. Renu meets a lawyer to send a fake divorce notice to Ranjit. They patch up things in the evening after Ranjit brings gifts for Renu.
2	The Sofa cum Bed	Bumbling furniture salesman	Renu and Ranjit order a sofa; so do their neighbours. The salesman wrongly delivers their neighbours' sofa who turn up to claim it exactly when they have a guest. They try to manage the situation and everything ends well.
3	The South Indian Marriage (Part I)	Groom's father	Ranjit and Renu's south Indian neighbour requests them to let him invite a prospective groom and his parents to meet his daughter, Kavita, at their house since he doesn't have proper space at his house. The groom and his parents mistake Renu as the bride. During the meeting the prospective bride and the groom slip away without seeing each other, as they are both in love with someone else.
4	South Indian Marriage (Part II)	Groom's father	The parents spend time at Ranjit's house looking for a solution. The groom's parents bring their second son while the bride's parents plan to present their second daughter, Savita, as Kavita. Meanwhile, it is revealed that the prospective bride and groom were in love with each other but break-up on hearing that the other person was meeting someone else for marriage. Both return to Ranjit's house independently. Much confusion and commotion ensues, but everything is sorted out in the end.
5	Renu as a salesgirl	Vinod - Ranjit's colleague	Renu is annoyed when Ranjit describes how he flirts with salesgirls in his office. She takes up a job as a saleswoman herself and turns up at Ranjit's office flirting with him and his colleague, Vinod. Ranjit's boss decides to cancel and give no further orders to salesgirls. Renu then dresses up as a salesman and takes the order for her company.The
6	Cancer	Doctor	Ranjit gets a routine medical check-up done, but his report is mixed up with someone else's. The doctor breaks the bad news that he has cancer and has only five days to live. Ranjit decides not to break the news to Renu and Raja, but starts acting strange nevertheless. The doctor is even more woeful and depressed, due to which Renu thinks he is having some fatal disease himself. A nurse finally realises the mistake and brings the correct report to Ranjit's house where everybody is mourning.
7	Guess Who's Coming for Dinner?	Renu's boss	To gain a push in the career, Ranjit and Renu challenge each other to invite their boss for dinner, so that they can please their respective bosses with a grand dinner and in return they get a promotion in the career. To make matters more complicated, Ranjit and Renu invite their respective bosses on the same day.
8	Women's Liberation (Part I)	Keshwani	Sheila, Renu's foreign-returned friend pays her a visit. She sees that Ranjit and Raja are very dependent on Renu for the daily chores, and that Renu has to do housework as well as her job. Based on Sheila's suggestion, Renu decides that she will not slave for the men. In the evening all four go to Ranjit's Sindhi friend Keshwani's, house for dinner. He makes fun of Ranjit when Renu refuses to do any work asked for by Ranjit. Ranjit invites Keshwani to dinner betting that he will also show that he is in control of Renu.
9	Women's Liberation (Part II)	Keshwani	Renu refuses to prepare dinner for Keshwani's visit. In the evening the three women (Renu, Sheila and the Sindhi friend's wife) go for an outing by themselves and leave the men worrying about their own dinner. The next morning Renu relents and agrees to prepare breakfast for Ranjit and Raja provided they also participate in housework.
10	Raja Falls in Love	Prashanto Bannerjee	Bhattacharya's (Ranjit's neighbour) sister in law comes to visit the neighbourhood from Bengal. Raja meets her and falls in love with her. He learns that she was in love with a Bengali man, Prashanto Bannerjee, but broke up when she saw him with someone else. Prashanto comes to visit them and explains to Raja that there has been a misunderstanding. Raja's hopes are shattered when the lovers make up.
11	Thief's Sweet Tooth (Part I)	Thief	A thief is on the loose in Juhu area where Ranjit's family resides. Renu has prepared gulabjamuns (sweets) and warns everyone not to eat them. However, when she checks in the night, some gulabjamuns are missing. Ranjit and Raja also come to check out. While they are arguing over the missing sweets, the thief who was in hiding eats some more. Raja catches the thief (who wears a mask) but he escapes. The police ask Raja to announce in the newspaper that he can recognise the thief so that they can use him as a bait and trap him.
12	Thief's Sweet Tooth (Part II)	Thief	A plainclothes policeman comes to Ranjit's house to check everything is OK and to warn Raja to be careful. He also is fond of gulabjamun. Ranjit and family think he is the thief and drug him by mixing sleep-inducing medicines in the sweets. The real thief comes dressed as a policeman to teach Raja a lesson. They tell him the entire story believing he is a policeman. The thief fools them, holds them at gunpoint, and reveals his identity. Renu tricks him into eating the drugged sweets from the kitchen.
13	Blackmail	Blackmailer thief	Ranjit is home one day when a thief comes to his house pretending to be a salesgirl. She tries to get Ranjit in a compromising position, after which she and her accomplice try to blackmail Ranjit for money. Even after he pays up, they plan to continue the blackmail. Ranjit's neighbour Bhattacharya has overheard the whole thing and tells Renu the truth. Ranjit gets Raja to appear as a police constable, while Renu gets Bhattacharya disguised as an inspector to nab the crooks next time they are there. Raja and Bhattacharya start a fight amongst themselves about who is the real police while the crooks slip away in the commotion.
14	Pregnancy (Part I)	No appearance	Renu's neighbour Kavita is pregnant and requests Renu to knit socks and caps etc. for the 'to be born'. Seeing some knitted socks, Ranjit thinks Renu is pregnant. The confusion continues when Ranjit talks about the expected newcomer and Renu thinks he is talking about the new puppy she is thinking of getting.
15	Pregnancy (Part II)	Psychiatrist	The confusion over whether Renu is pregnant continues until matters are cleared up.
16	Raja As a Salesman	Department store owner	Raja is feeling very low and depressed. Department store owner (Satish Shah) offers Raja the job of a salesman at his store. At first, with complete uninterest, Raja takes the job and humiliates a customer that has been visiting the store for 30 years. He explains later that flower vase that he is planning to buy is available cheaper at the footpath. However, after Raja is encouraged by Ranjit and the store owner, he decides to show his sales skills. He sells the flower pot at an exorbitant price not only to the previous customers but to Ranjit as well as to the department store owner himself.
17	Smugglers' Den	Smuggler's Man Friday	Ranjit's briefcase containing contract papers worth Rs. 20 lakhs is exchanged with that of a smuggler's (Moolchand played by Satish Shah) containing diamonds worth Rs.20 lakhs. Satish Kaushik is the main smuggler boss and Avtar Gill and Satish Shah are his henchmen. The whole smuggler gang reaches Ranjeet's house to retrieve the briefcase. At the same time Raja is practising with his theatre group for some play. Raja thinks that the smugglers are the cast members he was waiting for. Further, the play has a story involving a briefcase. Confusion and comedy of errors results with a total of three briefcases.
19	The Antique Gift	Retired Army Colonel	Renu and Ranjit are heading to a friend's place, a retired Army colonel, when they realize they don't have a gift to offer him. They decide to take a brass face from Zambia, which was gifted to them by Renu's friend. However, Mrs. Talwar demands her gift back when she realizes that the gift was actually meant for someone else. The retired colonel, a superstitious man, is reluctant to return the gift since it has brought him good luck. Renu and Ranjit use different tactics to get the gift back from the colonel, only to realize Mrs. Talwar intended to give it to him.
20	Truth or Lies?	Guru Gokulji	Ranjit is suddenly inspired to speak only the truth after he meets a guru Gokulji. His truths cause problems to all and sundry including marital quarrels amongst the neighbours, the Bhattacharyas. He is forced to abandon his truthful ways after the problems caused when he reveals to Gokulji's wife that her husband dislikes her.
21	Double Trouble	Anju's Father	Raja is dating two girls, Anju and Manju. Renu and Ranjit disapprove and warn the girls' fathers. Trouble starts when both girls elope and come to Raja's house to marry. Their fathers, too, come looking for their daughters.
22	Marital Rift	Ranjit's father	Ranjit and Renu get into a fight while mediating an argument between a married couple who are their friends. Raja gets bothered and calls Ranjit's father and Renu's mother for an intervention. Instead, both in-laws get into an argument over their children, while Ranjit and Renu repent at their workplace for their actions. They call each other and patch things up, but Raja tells them they've to pretend to fight so their parents can "solve their issue." The fake-fight flares into a real one again.
23	The Cooking Range	Ranjit's father	Renu wants a cooking range to expedite her household work and to satisfy Ranjit's and Raja's demand for food to be prepared quickly. She orders that everyone start becoming frugal with their finances, including giving up on day-to-day comforts and start collecting their savings. Unfortunately, their bills pile up, too, till they are forced to pay them after being admonished by Ranjit's father for being irresponsible. They lose all their savings. Ranjit's father ultimately surprises them with a gift: a cooking range.
24	New Member Arrives	Bedi	Ranjit is in London. In order to pay Rs.5000 for a policy premium, Raja suggests Renu that they accommodate a paying guest named Bedi, who pays the amount as deposit. Ranjit calls shortly after and informs Renu that his aunt (Chachi) and her daughter, Rashmi are coming from Meerut to stay on account of Rashmi's employment. Raja doesn't get along well with Chachi, who in turn doesn't like Bedi staying there. Chachi refuses to stay there because of Bedi and is ready to leave, when one of Renu's friends who owes her Rs.5000 turns up and reveals she is Bedi's older sister. The accounts are settled, Bedi leaves, and Renu convinces Chachi to stay on since Rashmi gets a job too.
25	Jhumroo	Maharaj	Chachi's home-servant, Jhumroo, runs away from Meerut to stay with her since he is tired of her husband's antics. Raja wants Jhumroo gone because he catches him wearing his clothes and breaks his guitar strings. Raja hires a Maharaj (cook) to replace him, who bullies Jhumroo a lot. Jhumroo breaks down and decides to leave, when Raja catches the Maharaj consuming the household's grocery supplies. The Maharaj is fired and Jhumroo and Raja patch up.
26	Rashmi gets a haircut	Rashmi's boss	Rashmi decides to get a haircut instead of sporting pigtails since she finds it old-fashioned and her boss makes fun of her. She is, however, scared that her mother, Chachi wouldn't be pleased. Renu convinces her to get one and keep it a secret from Chachi. Jhumroo sees her with a new haircut and Rashmi's boss falls for her. Rashmi wears a wig to keep her mother in the dark, but her boss and Jhumroo expose the truth in front of Chachi by pulling the wig off. Chachi is pleased with the Rashmi's new hair-cut.
27	Chachi Gets Lost	Rustomji	Raja, Rashmi, and Jhumroo return home from a picnic, but leave Chachi behind in the city accidentally. Bhattacharya and his wife aid them in looking for Chachi. Meanwhile, Chachi runs into an old Parsee man, Rustomji, who is looking for his wife who got lost and goes around town with him, while her family searches for her frantically. Since Bhattacharya and his wife don't know what Chachi looks like, they bring a random old lady home. Chachi finally finds her home and invites Rustomjee, too, where it's revealed the old lady whom Bhattacharya and his wife brought home is his wife.
28	Unwanted Guest	Mishra	An annoying neighbor of Chachi from Meerut, Mishra, barges in uninvited and creates a lot of trouble for the family. He makes a mess out of the house and invites his own friends in without permission, and the family tries getting rid of him.
29	Raja Goes Detective	Pandey	Raja finds a part-time job in Bhattacharya's friend, Chandola's Sameer Khakhar detective agency. Chandola is frustrated with his existing detective, Pandey, and assigns a dangerous task of following a smuggler to Raja as a training assignment. Pandey vows to exact his revenge on Raja and Chandola and tries to sabotage Raja's assignment but ends up helping Raja apprehend the smuggler. Pandey is then reinstated in the agency.
30	Babysitting	Toy seller	Jhumroo is bored at home, but neither Raja, Renu, nor Chachi agree to let him accompany them on their outing. He tries crank-calling and accidentally reaches a lady who mistakes him for a daycare center owner. She leaves her child with Jhumroo, who proves more than a handful for all.
31	Rambhai Shyambhai	Rambhai/Shyambhai	Raja is expecting an interview call from Rambhai Shyambhai & Co., but he gets the call from Shyambhai & Co. and Rambhai & Co., who have split up and are fierce rivals. He gets the letter from the former, whereas Chachi and Renu get the letter from the latter when Raja's nowhere to be found. Chachi and Renu go to Rambhai & Co. to mention that Raja is sick and would be delayed for the interview, but Chachi signs up for the job and Raja gets employed by Shyambhai & Co. As a result, Raja and Chachi become fierce rivals.
32	Dieting	Tiku	Raja and Chachi get an offer from director Vidhu Vinod Chopra (playing himself), Ranjit's friend, to star in his movie about slum-dwellers, which requires both to lose weight. A dieting instructor, Tiku, is sent to get the job done, but at the end of the program they end up gaining weight. However, the director comes by and reveals that a change in script now requires obese characters, and all is well.
33	Renu misses Ranjit	Jaikishen	Renu is uninterested in her daily life, behaves oddly around the house and loses her temper often. The rest cannot understand her behavior and try to cheer her up to no avail. When they realize the true cause for her behavior is because she misses Ranjit, Bhattacharya offers to cheer her up by asking one of his co-workers as Ranjit's colleague and bring her gifts. However, Ranjit's real friend Jaikishen turns up first and brings gifts for all but is mistaken for Bhattacharya's co-worker. When Bhattacharya's co-worker comes by, the confusion is cleared. Jaikishen then returns with a ticket for Renu to fly to London to live with Ranjit.
34	Bhattacharya Acts	Playwright	Bhattacharya has been doing some theater as a lead actor to surprise his wife, Mandira, and has been mumbling romantic lines in his sleep to prepare for his role. Mandira, mistakes it as him having an affair and when she complains to Chachi, she employs Raja to tail him. Raja catches Bhattacharya and the lead actress rehearsing their lines in the open and confirms an affair. Bhattacharya brings everyone to the rehearsals and clears the misconception. The script is deemed too romantic for Mandira, Chachi, Rashmi, and Raja, and Bhattacharya's acting stint is terminated.
35	Rashmi in love	Bablu's dad	Rashmi reveals to Raja that she has a shy and introverted boyfriend named Bablu, whose father is opposed to the relationship and locks him in his room. Chachi agrees to the relationship and confronts Bablu's dad at his place, while Rashmi helps Bablu escape. Bablu's dad heads to Rashmi's place to bring back Bablu, where Rashmi realizes Bablu is too much of a weakling to confront his father and lets him go.
36	Jhumroo becomes smart	Eccentric professor	Jhumroo gets frustrated of being ordered around by Raja, Chachi, and Rashmi. A neighbor's maid, Lakshmi suggests him ways of getting back at his family. He adds a lot of chillies in the dinner, but it backfires when Raja, Rashmi, and Chachi taste it and go outside to eat, leaving Jhumroo to eat the fiery food. Lakshmi then asks him to work for an eccentric professor, who promises him good pay and benefits for moving his precious furniture around the house. However, his new master is too weird for him and Jhumroo returns to his family.
37	Raja as a copywriter	Vicky	Raja shows his capability to write advertising slogans and lands up in an advertising agency, where he manages to impress a client manufacturing soaps, much to the chagrin of Vicky, the advertising agency bigwig. The client asks both Raja and Vicky to come up with a competing slogan. Raja recruits Chachi to help sell the slogan and wins the contract, but the soap company loses market due to a rival brand. The client asks a slogan for tea leaves, but before Chachi and Raja can come up with a slogan, a rival tea brand upstages the client's tea brand.
38	Bombay to Pune	Police inspector	Raja, Chachi, Rashmi, and Jhumroo plan a trip from Bombay to Pune. Bhattacharya barges in and asks to join in on the fun, and offers to buy tickets. However, he mistakes it for the movie Bombay to Pune and buys tickets for the movie instead, while the others wait hopelessly at the train station. Bhattacharya ends up in jail for selling tickets illegally, whereas Raja and the rest land in jail for buying tickets illegally, where the confusion is cleared.
39	Forecast	Ravi	Raja, Chachi, Rashmi, Bhattacharya, and Jhumroo find their daily horoscope's forecasts coming real, but Rashmi's friend, Ravi, doesn't believe it.
40	Jack and Johnny	Johnny	Johnny and Jack (music director, Ajit) are famous singers who sing together. They have a fallout over a song and a foreign tour is canceled. Rashmi, who works for them, tells it to Chachi and Raja who become interested. Jack overhears Chachi singing and asks her to join his team. Johnny, who is also seeking a singing partner, is duped by Jack and Chachi into recruiting Raja whom Johnny thinks is a famous singer from USA, Buddu. Raja passes the test with help from Jack and lip-synching but sides with Johnny for fame and fortune. A competition, with the prize being a foreign tour, occurs between the two duos where they try to sabotage the other by mixing a medicine that causes hiccups in their drinks. The contest results in a stalemate and Jack and Johnny patch up.
41	Raja's Interview	Raja's boss	Raja is being coerced by Chachi to find a job in Allahabad, but he wants to find a job in Mumbai. He goes to an interview for the position of an accounts officer, but his employer hires for a peon position. He, however, lies to his family about his job. Raja discovers that his new boss is a failed actor pretending to be an officer in his friend's office to appease his father. His boss' father, Chachi, and Bhattacharya land in the office at the same time, forcing both to pretend to be accounts officers, but they're caught. Raja is forced by Chachi to leave for Allahabad, but a telegram arrives indicating that position is filled.
42	Instant Solution	Sadashiv(Bhattacharya's Rival)/Club Owner/Eccentric Actor who portrays Shah Jahan/Customer	
43	Raja becomes Reporter - Part I	Editor Tondon of Demonstrated weekly	
44	Raja becomes Reporter - Part II	Editor Tondon of Demonstrated weekly	
45	Rambo	Thadhani	Renu and Ranjit return from London. Ranjit bought one small robo "Rambo".
46	Time is Money	Vinod	Ranjit apply new time management formula to his company and life.
47	Boy Friend	Sanjay(Ranjit's Friend)	
48	Mary	Himanshu Da, Writer	
49	Lottery I	Bilwa, Lottery Ticket Dealer	Raja, Renu and Ranjit get lottery fever. They run into Bilwa, an eccentric lottery ticket dealer with tagline "Thirty years ka experience hai!"
50	Lottery II	Bilwa, Lottery Ticket Dealer	Raja, Renu and Ranjit get lottery fever. They run into Bilwa, an eccentric lottery ticket dealer with tagline "Thirty years ka experience hai!"
51	Transfer of Boss	Vinod, Ranjit's colleague	Ranjit and his colleague Vinod try to manipulate their boss to avoid being the employee who gets transferred to remote Madhavpur
52	Kidnapping	Kidnapper	Raja tries to get Rs. 50,000 from an elderly relative, who refuses. Raja then plots with a kidnapper to stage his kidnapping and ask for the money as a ransom.
53	Wedding I	(Groom Radhe appears in part 2)	Raja's friend and ex-classmate, comes over to invite Raja and family for her wedding. Raja jokingly flirts with her and speaks of his hopes of marrying her, Rekha doesn't know if he's joking or not. After she leaves, Ranjit realizes Rekha is his boss' daughter. Ranjit's boss, Mr. Gupta, has his whole office managing the wedding.
54	Wedding II	Groom Radhe	Ranjit's boss, Mr. Gupta, has his whole office managing his daughter, Rekha's wedding. However, the staff are incompetent and Raja fixes all their mistakes one by one. Rekha and Mr. Gupta are impressed with Raja. Meanwhile, the groom refuses to marry Rekha as he is already secretly married. Rekha and her family choose a last minute replacement for the groom - Raja.
55	Honeymoon I	-	Raja and Rekha leave for their honeymoon, but Mr. Gupta insists on giving them way too many things to carry. In the way to Hotel Honeymoon, Raja and Rekha sing and dance in Bollywood style.
56	Honeymoon II	-	Hotel Honeymoon Manager keeps a room for Mr. Gupta's daughter and son-in-law, and refuses a room to Raja and Rekha, not knowing that they are the same couple.
57	Honeymoon III	-	The confusion and drama for double bedroom continues as Raja and Rekha get separate single bed rooms. To add to their woes, Mr. Gupta himself arrives at Hotel Honeymoon.
58	The sleeping pill		
59	The Chase		
60	Executive Director		
61	Benefit of Lying		
62	The Actress		
63	The Fakir		
64	The Conman		
65	The Court		
66	The Verdict		
67	The speech files		

== Reception ==
In a retrosepctive review, Chandrima Pal of Scroll.in wrote, "Long before comedy shows on Indian television became an excuse to pimp slap-stick and bawdy humour, Yeh Jo Hai Zindagi gave millions of Doordarshan viewers a taste of a truly indigenous sitcom that was decidedly middle class, replete with generic tomfoolery and yet retained an irreverent and gentle heart."

== See also ==
- List of Hindi comedy shows
