= Kabhi Haan Kabhi Naa =

1993 Indian film by Kundan Shah

- Poster
- Directed by: Kundan Shah
- Written by: Pankaj Advani; Kundan Shah; Dialogues: Ranjit Kapoor
- Produced by: Vikram Mehrotra
- Starring: Shah Rukh Khan; Deepak Tijori; Suchitra Krishnamoorthi; Naseeruddin Shah
- Cinematography: Virendra Saini
- Edited by: Renu Saluja
- Music by: Jatin–Lalit
- Release dates: January 1993 (New Delhi); 25 February 1994
- Running time: 158 minutes
- Country: India
- Language: Hindi
- Budget: ₹14 million
- Box office: ₹55 million

Kabhi Haan Kabhi Naa (transl. Sometimes Yes, Sometimes No) is a 1993 Hindi-language coming-of-age comedy drama film directed by Kundan Shah, starring Shah Rukh Khan, Deepak Tijori, Suchitra Krishnamurthy (in her Hindi film debut) and Naseeruddin Shah. With a budget of ₹14 million (US$446,226.52), the film received positive reviews and grossed ₹55 million (US$1.75 million), equivalent to ₹838 million (US$12.25 million) adjusted for inflation as of 2018.

At the 39th Filmfare Awards, it won 2 awards – Best Film (Critics) and Best Actor (Critics) for Khan, who also won Best Actor for Baazigar at the same ceremony. It is widely considered to be one of Khan's best performances, and he has said that it is his favorite film. It was premiered at the Indian Panorama section of the 24th International Film Festival of India.

Shah Rukh Khan has bought the rights to the film under his banner, Red Chillies Entertainment.

The film was remade in Telugu as Swapnalokam (1999), with Jagapathi Babu and Raasi in the cast.

== Plot ==
Sunil is woken up from his dream of marrying the girl he loves, Anna, by his younger sister Nikki.

Sunil is a happy-go-lucky scamp who loves music and is not interested in studies, which bothers his father, Vinayak. Everyone has given up on Sunil and thinks he is good for nothing except for Father Braganza, who believes Sunil is pure at heart.

Sunil, Anna, and Chris are 3 members of a 6-person music band, who are looking to make it big. Anna rejoins the group after being away for a while, which makes Chris happy as he loves Anna. After Anna reenters his life, Sunil begins to try and change his ways to get Anna to fall in love with him.

During a performance at a friend's wedding, Sunil notices the closeness between Anna and Chris. Devastated, he decides to create a rift between them. Sunil eventually gets caught in his web of lies. A furious Anna slaps him and decides to never talk to him again. Sunil is thrown out of the band. However, fortune favors Sunil as he saves the band from being heckled at a local club by putting on a stellar show; the entire band forgives and welcomes him back.

At the same time, Sunil fails his exams again, having done so three times already. While Vinayak is upset and no longer wishes to associate with his son anymore, with Father Braganza and everyone's advice and support, he eventually forgives his son and accepts his passion and talent for music, upon realizing Sunil is gaining success as a musician, especially since Sunil was brave enough to speak the truth.

Sunil thinks he has won Anna back but finds out that Anna and Chris love each other and want to be married. Crushed to pieces, Sunil accepts he has lost in love.

Meanwhile, Anna's father decides that Chris is worthy of marrying her. He makes his intentions known but Chris' parents have other ideas and fix his marriage to their friend's daughter. Anna and her family are dejected.

Sunil consoles Anna and the tide slowly turns in his favor. Anna's father believes that Sunil will love and take care of her and convinces Anna to marry Sunil. Sunil is overjoyed until he realizes Anna still loves Chris. Sunil ultimately reunites the two and gets them married. On their wedding day, as Chris and Anna are about to exchange rings, Chris drops his ring and it rolls out of sight. Sunil spots the ring but feigns ignorance, even as Nikki gazes at him with a heavy heart. Eventually, Chris locates the ring, and the couple gets married.

Just after the wedding, Sunil is seen sitting on the sidewalk, dejected and heartbroken. By chance, a random girl, who is lost and seeking directions, approaches him. Sometime later, Sunil and the girl are seen walking in the moonlight and talking merrily.

Anthony and Vasco, two criminals who are a part of the story (and earlier wished to help Sunil win Anna over having been fans of his), see Sunil with the new girl and break the fourth wall, saying that Sunil will be alright. The criminals hear the police siren and immediately scamper away as the credits roll.

== Cast ==
- Shah Rukh Khan as Sunil
- Deepak Tijori as Chris
- Suchitra Krishnamurthy as Anna Gonsalves
- Naseeruddin Shah as Father Braganza
- Rita Bhaduri as Mary Gonsalves, Anna's mother
- Satish Shah as Simon Gonsalves, Anna's father
- Anjan Srivastav as Vinayak, Sunil's father
- Goga Kapoor as Anthony Gomez, the Don
- Ravi Baswani as Albert Gonsalves, Anna's brother
- Tiku Talsania as Patel, the bar owner
- Ashutosh Gowarikar as Imran Bilal, Sunil's friend
- Kurush Deboo as Yezdi, Sunil's best friend
- Aditya Lakhia as Tony, Sunil's friend
- Shashi Sahay as Prabha, Sunil's mother
- Sadiya Siddiqui as Nikki, Sunil's sister
- Virendra Saxena as Vasco, Anthony's right-hand-man
- Anita Kanwal as Chris's mother
- Jyoti Nathan
- Suhaas
- Preeta Mathur
- Snehal Lakhia
- Munila Siddiqui
- Ajit Vachani in a special appearance as Charles Rodrigues, Chris's father
- Juhi Chawla as herself in a special appearance

== Production ==
The film was shot in Goa and Mumbai.

== Music ==
The music was composed by Jatin–Lalit, while the lyrics were penned by Majrooh Sultanpuri. The song "Sachhi Ye Kahaani Hai" derives from two songs; Boney M.'s "Rasputin" (1978), and Johnny Wakelin's "In Zaire". Kabhi Haan Kabhi Naa sold over 800,000 soundtrack albums in India.

No.	Title	Singer(s)	Length
1.	"Ae Kaash Ke Hum"	Kumar Sanu	05:10
2.	"Aana Mere Pyar Ko Na Tum"	Kumar Sanu & Alka Yagnik	03:59
3.	"Deewana Dil Deewana"	Amit Kumar & Udit Narayan	07:37
4.	"Woh Toh Hai Albela"	Kumar Sanu & Devaki Pandit	05:09
5.	"Sachi Yeh Kahani Hai"	Amit Kumar & Alka Yagnik	06:30
6.	"Kyon Na Hum Milke Pyar"	Amit Kumar, Udit Narayan & Vijayeta Pandit	04:21
Total length:			32:49

== Release ==
Kabhi Haan Kabhi Naa had it premiere at the Panorama section of the 24th International Film Festival of India in January 1993. It was theatrically released in India on 24 February 1994.

It was re-released on 31 October 2025 as part of SRK Film Festival, a two week special screening by PVR INOX to celebrate Khan's 60th birthday.

== Reception ==
In a retrospective review, Sampada Sharma of The Indian Express wrote, "SRK played everything from a lost lover to man dealing with mental health issues. Shah’s Kabhi Haan Kabhi Naa was also a unique film in that respect. If made traditionally, it could have been a love story of Chris and Anna where Sunil is the villain of their life. But Kundan Shah decided to tell this story from the point of view of this lost guy who doesn’t drown himself in alcohol, and isn’t out to burn the world just because he got stuck in an unsuccessful love story. He moves on with his broken heart hoping that it will heal over time." Sukanya Verma of Rediff.com wrote, "What makes Kundan Shah's second classic after Jaane Bhi Do Yaaron great is that he makes his characters and situations entirely believable. The humour is subtle and circumstantial."

=== Awards ===
39th Filmfare Awards:

- Best Film (Critics)
- Best Actor (Critics) – Shah Rukh Khan
