= P Se PM Tak =

- Directed by: Kundan Shah
- Written by: Kundan Shah
- Produced by: Jayantilal Gada
- Starring: Meenakshi Dixit; Bharat Jadhav; Yashpal Sharma; Chinmay Jadhav; Aanjjan Srivastav; Akhilendra Mishra
- Cinematography: Rajesh Joshi
- Edited by: Aseem Sinha; Javed Sayyed
- Release date: 4 April 2014
- Running time: 123 minutes
- Country: India
- Language: Hindi

P Se PM Tak (transl. From P to the PM) is a 2014 Hindi-language film written and directed by Kundan Shah. The film stars Meenakshi Dixit in the lead role. Dixit, who has appeared in several Tamil, Telugu and Malayalam films, plays a prostitute in the film which also features Indrajeet Soni, Bharat Jadhav, Yashpal Sharma, Aanjjan Srivastav. The film was earlier titled Masquerade, but later changed to P Se PM Tak. The film was released on 4 April 2014.

== Plot ==
P Se PM Tak is a political satire on modern Indian politics. A penniless prostitute arrives in a town where a by-election is taking place and gets caught up in the politics, eventually becoming chief minister.

== Cast ==
- Meenakshi Dixit
- Indrajeet Soni
- Bharat Jadhav
- Yashpal Sharma
- Aanjjan Srivastav
- Vedish
- Chinmay Jadhav
- Aakash Pandey
- Akhilendra Mishra
- Prerna Wanvari
- Deepak Shirke
- Mushtaq Khan
- Upasana Singh
- Virendra Saxena
- Aanand Kale
- Pandharinath Kamble
- Rocky Verma
- Rana Norana
- Sanjay Dadhich

== Soundtrack ==
P Se PM Tak

Soundtrack album
- Released: 21 May 2015
- Genre: Feature film soundtrack

The music for the film is composed by Jatin Pandit and lyrics by Vinoo Mahendra. The soundtrack of the film comprises 2 songs. The full audio album of the film was released on 21 May 2015 on YouTube.

No.	Title	Singer(s)	Length
1.	"Chu Le Yeh Badan"	Khushi	6:53
2.	"Balle Balle"	Amit Kumar	0:54
