= Abaidha =

- DVD cover of the film
- Directed by: Gul Bahar Singh
- Written by: Partha Banerjee and Subbir Mukherjee
- Produced by: S.M. Bhura, Siddharth Bhura and Sharad Bhura (executive producer)
- Starring: Chiranjeet Chakraborty (see cast section)
- Cinematography: Shakti Banerjee
- Edited by: Ujjal Nandi
- Music by: Kalyan Sen Barat
- Production companies: Sunrise Media & Effects
- Release date: 29 June 2002
- Running time: 1 hour 54 minutes
- Country: India
- Language: Bengali

Abaidha (transl. Illegal) is a Bengali film written by Partha Banerjee and Subbir Mukherjee, and directed by Gul Bahar Singh. The film stars Chiranjeet Chakraborty, Debashree Roy, and Rajit Kapur. It was shown in the Montreal film festival and Commonwealth film festival in Manchester in 2002. The film has won the Bengal film journalists' association award for best actor for Chiranjeet Chakraborty. The film has also participated in the 2002 4th Cinemaya festival of Asian Cinema in New Delhi.

== Cast ==
- Chiranjeet Chakraborty
- Debashree Roy
- Rajit Kapur
- Sumitra Mukherjee
- Dulal Lahiri
- Monu Mukherjee
- Manjushree
- Chandan Sen

== Awards ==
- 2003, Best actor award at Bengal Film Journalists' Association Awards.
