= Ram Kripal Sinha =

Indian politician (1934–2023)

Union Minister of State for Labour and Parliamentary Affairs
- In office 1977–1979
- President: Basappa Danappa Jatti (Acting); Neelam Sanjiva Reddy
- Prime Minister: Morarji Desai

Personal details
- Born: April 1934
- Died: 15 January 2023 (aged 88)
- Spouse: Mridula Sinha

Ram Kripal Sinha (April 1934 – 15 January 2023) was an Indian politician from the state of Bihar. He was a minister of state in the Government of India and a cabinet minister in the Government of Bihar. He was the office secretary of Bharatiya Janata Party Parliamentary Party Executive Committee.

== Early life and education ==
Sinha was born in April 1934 in the Matihani village of Bihar. He obtained two Master of Arts degree in English and a Doctorate in Prakrit.

== Career ==
Sinha started his career as a college lecturer based in Muzaffarpur town, Bihar. Shortly afterwards, he received his doctorate, he settled in Muzaffarpur of Bihar. In 1968, he was elected as a member to the Bihar Legislative Council which he served until 1974. In 1971, he was appointed as cabinet minister in the Socialist Party (India) government of Chief Minister Karpoori Thakur. On 3 April 1974, he was elected as a member of the Rajya Sabha, the upper house of Parliament of India and served as a parliamentarian until 1980. During this term, he was appointed as the Union Minister of State for Labour and Parliamentary Affairs in the Janata Party government of Prime Minister Morarji Desai and served in this post until the dissolution of Government in 1979.

== Personal life and death ==
Sinha was married to Mridula Sinha who was the Governor of Indian state Goa and a writer in Hindi Literature and politician.

Sinha died from congestive heart failure on 15 January 2023, at the age of 88.
