= Gul Bahar Singh =

Indian film-maker

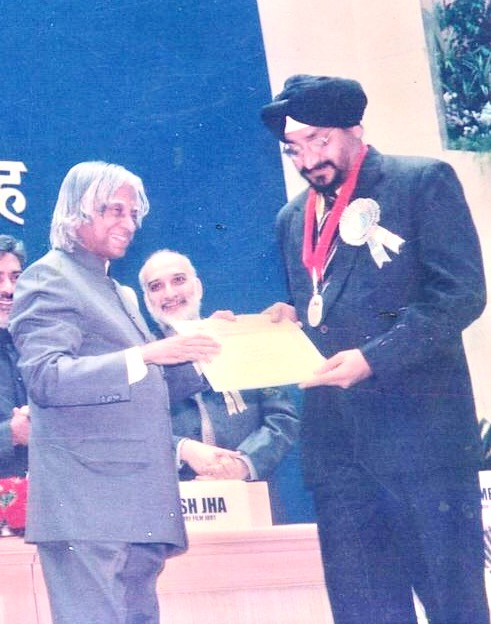
- Born: Pakur, Jharkhand
- Occupation: Filmmaker
- Years active: 1980–present

Gul Bahar Singh is a six time national award winning Indian film-maker. He received first national award in 1986 for his documentary film, Anukaran.

== Early life ==
Singh was born in Pakur, Jharkhand in a Sikh family and he is the youngest child of his parents. He studied in Pakur, Kolkata, and Faridabad, after completing his graduation Singh self-trained himself to become a filmmaker.

== Career ==
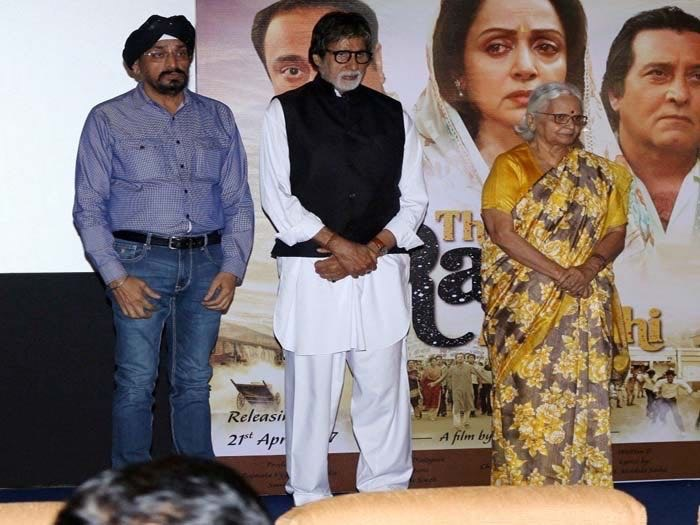
Gul Bahar Singh with actor Amitabh Bachchan

He started his career in 1980 with his first documentary "Weeds" on street children, which received very good response. He received first national award in 1986 for his documentary film Anukaran, a film on status of women in India. In 1991 he received national award for film Biotechnology; Some possibilities.

He made a long documentary for Doordarshan on life of noted Hindi writer Munshi Premchand starred Irrfan Khan as Premchand. In 1999 Hindi feature film Sundari produced by N.F.D.C. was screened in Calcutta film festivals and Participated in Vith, International film festivals in Sochi, Moscow and received Diploma for participation. He also won National award in 44th National Film Awards as best film on Family welfare for Bengali short film Bheet and won National award in 45th National Film Awards for Gotipua. The Goal feature Irfan Khan in main lead won Golden Lotus at 47th National Film Awards as best children film and received special Jury award at 11th, Cairo International Children's Film Festival held in Egypt, received special mention by the jury of International Federation of Film Societies in 2001 in Czech Republic. The film was also selected in India Panorama in 2001, and also participated in Golden Elephant Children's Film Festival in the same year. His feature film Dattak starring Rajit Kapoor and A. K. Hangal as main lead was the only Indian film which participated in the 5th Shanghai International Film Festival, China. In 2016, he made a feature-length biopic Ek Thi Rani Aisi Bhi starring Hema Malini and Vinod Khanna on the life of Rajmata Vijaya Raje Scendia of Gwalior.

== Awards ==
Year	Film	Gener	Award	Ref.
1986	Anukaran	Documentary	33rd National Film Awards	
1992	Biotechnology :Some possibility	Documentary	38th National Film Awards	
1997	Bheet	Short Film	National Award	
1999	Gotipua	Documentary	45th National Film Awards	
1999	Sundari	Feature Film	Certificate of Participation.	
2000	The Goal	Feature Film	National & International award	
2003	Dhatri Panna	Short Film	50th National Film Awards	
2003	Abaidha	Feature Film	Best Actor (BFJA); Certificate of Participations; Montreal film festival	
2003	Dalma Wild Life Sanctuary	Documentary	Certificate of Participation (Vatavaran)	

== Filmography ==
Year	Film	Note
1980	Weeds	Documentary
1982	The third hand	Documentary
1986	Anukaran	Documentary
1988	Ujjala	Telefilm
1991	Biotechnology :Some possibility	Documentary
1993	Bayen	Telefilm
1994	Sawa ser Gehoon	Telefilm
1995	Sikhs & Five takhts	Serial
1996	Melody Man	Documentary
1996	Premchand	Serial
1996	Jyon Mehndi ko Rang	Serial
1996	Seemant	Telefilm
1997	Bheet	Bengali short film
1998	Bansuriwala	Short film
1999	Gotipua	Documentary
1999	Sundari	Feature film
1999	The Goal	Feature film
2001	Dattak	Feature film
2002	Sixer	Feature film
2002	Tandav	Feature film
2003	Dhatripanna	Short film
2003	Abaidha	Bengali feature film
2004	Dalma wild Life Sanctuary	Documentary
2004	Saranda	Documentary
2004	Shravani Mela	Documentary
2005	Do Behne	Serial
2006	Jogajog	Bengali Telefilm
2007	Nishi Kutumb	Bengali serial
2008	Bhola Bhai Patel	Documentary
2010	Shahmal jat	Documentary
2013	Dalip Kaur Tiwana	Documentary
2015	Sarbat da Bhala	Documentary
2017	Ek Thi Rani Aisi Bhi	Feature film
