= Naan Sigappu Manithan (1985 film) =

1985 film by S. A. Chandrasekhar

- Film poster
- Directed by: S. A. Chandrasekhar
- Screenplay by: S. A. Chandrasekhar
- Story by: Shabd Kumar
- Based on: Aaj Ki Awaaz (1984)
- Produced by: A. Purnachandra Rao
- Starring: Rajinikanth; K. Bhagyaraj; Ambika
- Cinematography: M. Kesavan
- Edited by: P. R. Gautham Raju
- Music by: Ilaiyaraaja
- Production company: Lakshmi Productions
- Release date: 12 April 1985
- Running time: 147 minutes
- Country: India
- Language: Tamil

Naan Sigappu Manithan (Note: Spelt as Naan Sikappu Manithan on the CBFC certificate.) (transl. I am a Red Man) is a 1985 Indian Tamil-language vigilante action film directed by S. A. Chandrasekhar and produced by A. Purnachandra Rao under Lakshmi Productions. The film, a remake of Hindi film Aaj Ki Awaaz, stars Rajinikanth, K. Bhagyaraj and Ambika with Vijay as a child artist in the film. The music was composed by Ilaiyaraaja, while cinematography and editing were handled by M. Kesavan and P. R. Gautham Raju.

Naan Sigappu Manithan was released on 12 April 1985 and became a box office success.

== Plot ==
Vijay, a Tamil professor, lives with his widowed mother Lakshmi and his sister Shanti. During a visit to his friend Ravi's house, Vijay is disgusted by the illicit liquor and prostitution in the neighborhood and files a police complaint, but the cops don't pay heed as they are on the corruption's payroll and manages to warn them before making a raid. Ravi's sister gets killed and the culprit Mohanraj gets off scot-free with help from a minister. An enraged Vijay and Ravi clean up the liquor trade and brothel in the neighbourhood.

Mohanraj and his goons barges into Vijay's house, where they kill Lakshmi and assault Shanti, who later commits suicide by jumping from the terrace. Vijay turns into a vigilante, walking in the streets at nights and dealing out his own brand of justice. Vijay soon becomes known as Robin Hood. Chinna Salem Singaram, a CID officer, is assigned to unmask Robin Hood and begins his investigation. Vijay kills Mohanraj and his uncle, where he surrenders to Singaram revealing the truth, but Singaram mentions that he had already found the truth and decided not to arrest Vijay as he destroy the "weeds" that are harmful to the society.

However, Vijay feels guilty for the murders and surrenders himself. Vijay's girlfriend Uma appears in court in favour of Vijay and argues. The day before the judgment, Singaram disguise himself and tries to molest the judge's daughter, seeing which the judge tries to shoot him. Singaram reveals his identity and mentions that his intention was to make the judge understand that Vijay was also under a similar situation before. The judge sentences Vijay for lifetime imprisonment, but recommends to the President of India for granting a pardon.

== Cast ==
- Rajinikanth as Prof. Vijay (Robin Hood)
- K. Bhagyaraj as Chinna Salem Singaram, a CID officer
- Sathyaraj as Mohanraj
- Ambika as Uma
- Nizhalgal Ravi as Ravi
- M. N. Nambiar as Commissioner Amarnath
- Y. Gee. Mahendra as Harichandran
- Thengai Srinivasan as Minister Tambaram Thanga Kannan
- Sumathi as Shanthi, Vijay's younger sister
- Senthil as Senthil
- V. Gopalakrishnan as Adv. Sivaraman
- V. S. Raghavan as Judge Vishwanathan
- Vennira Aadai Moorthy as Krishnan, Anburaj's henchman
- S. R. Veeraraghavan as Justice Veeraraghavan, Uma's father
- Suryakanth as Mani, Anburaj's henchman
- Arundhathi as Meena, Ravi's wife
- Rajni Nivetha as Rani, Meena's younger sister
- Vaani as Lakshmi, Vijay's mother
- K. G. Shanthi as Visalam, Viswanathan's wife
- Swaminathan as Shanmugam
- Kovai Sarala as Saradha
- Renuka as Janaki, Uma's mother
- Anuradha in a cameo appearance
- T. K. S. Natarajan as Varadharajan
- Banerjee as a drunkard
- S. N. Surendar as a beggar
- S. A. Chandrasekhar as Sekhar, a ward boy at a hospital
- Master Haja Sheriff as a newspaper boy
- Vijay appears in the opening song in the pre-credits scene with a social message board

== Production ==
Though Rajinikanth stopped working in "double-hero" films by the mid-1980s, he accepted to work on this film, which had Bhagyaraj in another leading role, and no major alterations were made to the script.

== Themes ==
Writing for Jump Cut, Kumuthan Maderya noted Naan Sigappu Manithan's similarities to Death Wish (1974) and Death Wish II (1982). According to him, one factor that differentiates Naan Sigappu Manithan from those films is the "unleashing of nationalist angst in a climactic courtroom drama scene".

== Soundtrack ==
The music was composed by Ilaiyaraaja.

Title	Singer(s)	Lyrics	Length
"Ellarumey Thirudangathan"	Ilaiyaraaja	Vaali	04:09
"Gandhi Desamey"	S. P. Balasubrahmanyam	Vairamuthu	04:32
"Kungumathu Meni"	S. Janaki	Gangai Amaran	04:30
"Penn Maaney"	S. P. Balasubrahmanyam, S. Janaki	Mu. Metha	04:32
"Venmegam Vinnil"	S. P. Balasubrahmanyam	Pulamaipithan	04:47

== Reception ==
Jayamanmadhan of Kalki said the film would run for Rajinikanth and Bhagyaraj.
