= Pangari Tarf Haveli =

Village in Maharashtra

- Village
- Interactive map of Pangari Tarf Haveli
- Country: India
- State: Maharashtra

Pangari Tarf Haveli is a small village near the town of Dapoli, in Ratnagiri district, Maharashtra state in Western India. The 2011 Census of India recorded a total of 1,284 residents in the village. Pangari Tarf Haveli is 811 hectares in size.
