= Jaane Bhi Do Yaaro =

1983 Indian film by Kundan Shah

- Film poster
- Directed by: Kundan Shah
- Written by: Ranjit Kapoor; Satish Kaushik
- Screenplay by: Sudhir Mishra; Kundan Shah
- Story by: Sudhir Mishra; Kundan Shah
- Produced by: NFDC
- Starring: Naseeruddin Shah; Ravi Baswani; Bhakti Barve; Satish Shah; Om Puri; Pankaj Kapur; Satish Kaushik; Neena Gupta; Ashok Banthia
- Cinematography: Binod Pradhan
- Edited by: Renu Saluja
- Music by: Vanraj Bhatia
- Production company: National Film Development Corporation of India
- Distributed by: Ultra Media & Entertainment
- Release dates: 12 August 1983; 2 November 2012
- Running time: 132 min
- Country: India
- Language: Hindi
- Budget: ₹ 8-9 lakh

Jaane Bhi Do Yaaro (transl. Let It Go, Mates) is a 1983 Indian Hindi-language satirical black comedy film directed by Kundan Shah and produced by the NFDC. It is a dark satire on the rampant corruption in Indian politics, bureaucracy, news media, and business. The film stars an ensemble cast including Naseeruddin Shah, Ravi Baswani, Om Puri, Pankaj Kapur, Satish Shah, Satish Kaushik, Bhakti Barve and Neena Gupta. Vidhu Vinod Chopra was in the cast playing the cameo of Dushasana in the famous staging of the Mahabharata scene in the climax of the movie. He was also the production controller. Blow-Up, a 1966 English-language film directed by Michelangelo Antonioni in which a photographer unwittingly takes photographs of the killing, was an inspiration for a part of Jaane Bhi Do Yaaro. The production managers were Deepak Qazir, Imtiaz Bagdadi, Pavan Malhotra. Sudhir Mishra and Renu Saluja also figure as direction assistants.

Kundan Shah won the 1984 Indira Gandhi Award for Best Debut Film of a Director for his work. The film was part of the NFDC Retrospective at India International Film Festival in 2006.

== Plot ==
Professional photographers Vinod Chopra and Sudhir Mishra open a photo studio in the prestigious Haji Ali area in Bombay. After a disastrous start, they are given some work by Shobha Sen, the editor of Khabardar (transl. Beware, a pun on khabar meaning news), a publication that exposes the scandalous lives of the rich and the famous. Impressed with their work, Shobha hires them for a story about the connection between the Municipal Commissioner D'Mello and Tarneja, a builder. They find Tarneja and his business rival Ahuja working together to bribe D'Mello in order to win the contracts for the construction of four flyovers. Shobha asks the two photographers to create a rift between Tarneja and Ahuja. Vinod, impersonating Albert Pinto, leads Tarneja to believe that Ahuja, with Shobha's assistance, is trying to cheat him. Tarneja and Ahuja fight until Tarneja's secretary, Priya, arrives with Assistant Municipal Commissioner Srivastav and tells them that D'Mello has given the contracts to neither Tarneja nor Ahuja but to someone else.

Meanwhile, Sudhir and Vinod decide to enter a photography contest promising Rs. 5000/- and take a number of photos all over the city. In one of the photos, they see a man shooting someone, and after enlarging it, they realize that the killer is Tarneja. They return to the park where they shot that photo and eventually find out the crime scene. They find the body lying behind the bushes, but before the duo can get to the body, it disappears, but they manage to retrieve a gold cufflink.

Sometime later, Srivastav has become the new commissioner. Tarneja has built a flyover, dedicating it to the memory of the late D'Mello, who he says died of a terminal disease. Vinod and Sudhir attend the inauguration of the flyover and discover another cufflink there and realize that they're a pair. They return at night and dig up the area and unearth a coffin containing the dead body of D'Mello. They take several photos but lose the corpse again. Shobha starts blackmailing Tarneja with the photos. He invites her, Vinod and Sudhir for dinner and plants a time bomb to kill them. The bomb explodes after the three escape. They later find out from the news that the flyover built in the memory of D'Mello collapsed and the police suspect sabotage from Vinod and Sudhir. The duo learn about Shobha's blackmail and disassociate from her.

Vinod and Sudhir find out that the body is with Ahuja, who had, in an inebriated condition, carried the coffin to his farmhouse. They steal the corpse, but not before Tarneja, Ahuja, Srivastav, Shobha and others also get involved resulting in a series of comic mix-ups, resulting in Vinod and Sudhir having to hide D'Mello's body in a play production of the Mahabharata.

Vinod and Sudhir present their evidence to the police when they arrive at the theatre. Tarneja threatens to take Ahuja, Shobha and Srivastav down with him. Srivastav brokers a deal between the four of them. He frames Vinod and Sudhir for the collapse of the bridge, jailing the two. In the final scene, Vinod and Sudhir are shown released from prison. Still in their prison clothes, they make a symbolic cut-throat gesture.

== Cast ==
- Naseeruddin Shah as Vinod Chopra
- Ravi Baswani as Sudhir Mishra
- Om Puri as Ahuja, a corrupt contractor
- Pankaj Kapur as Tarneja, a corrupt contractor who murders D'Mello
- Satish Shah as D'Mello, Municipal Commissioner
- Bhakti Barve as Shobha Sen, editor of the "Khabardar" magazine (voice dubbed by Anita Kanwar)
- Rajesh Puri as Kamdar, assistant editor of the "Khabardar" magazine
- Satish Kaushik as Ashok Namboodirippad, Tarneja's assistant
- Neena Gupta as Priya, Tarneja's secretary
- Deepak Qazir as Srivastav, Assistant Municipal Commissioner
- Zafar Sanjari
- Ashok Banthia as News correspondent
- Vidhu Vinod Chopra as theater actor playing Dushasana
- Anupam Kher as voiceover for Architect Tulyaani at construction site
- Ajay Wadhavkar as Police Constable under the bridge

== Reception ==
The Mahabharata scene is considered to be one of the major highlights of the film, and has been praised for its humour.

In 2010, Dhiraj Nayyar in his op-ed for The Indian Express wrote, "In 1983, the average cinema-goer would perhaps have empathised closely with the two heroes and their tangle with the establishment. In contrast, in 2010, the average cinema-goer can perhaps only sympathise with the heroes given that it is perfectly possible to prosper without seeking favour from or getting entangled with a small cabal of crooks." In a retrospective review in 2020, Jyoti Kanyal of India Today wrote, "The film was released in 1983, but it is still relevant in the current times, given the current socio-political state of the country. In 1983, the year before Indira Gandhi's assassination, the nation was not in the best of moods. People were raising voices against corruption and intolerance. Jaane Bhi Do Yaaro chose to laugh away the bruise. It didn't hesitate from references and cross-references to politicians and scams."

== Re-release ==
A digitally restored print of the film was released on 2 November 2012 at selected theaters. The film opened to an enthusiastic welcome from the media.

== Awards ==
31st National Film Awards:

- Indira Gandhi Award for Best Debut Film of a Director: Kundan Shah

32nd Filmfare Awards:

Won

- Best Comedian – Ravi Baswani

Nominated

- Best Film – National Film Development Corporation of India
- Best Director – Kundan Shah
- Best Comedian – Satish Shah

== See also ==
- Assassinations in fiction
