= Om Katare =

Indian actor

- Born: 16 June 1954 (age 72); Datia, Madhya Pradesh, India
- Occupations: Theatre director Playwright; Actor; Theatre educator
- Years active: 1976–present
- Known for: Founder and Artistic Director of Yatri Theatre
- Awards: Sangeet Natak Akademi Award (Direction in Theatre)

Om Katare (born 16 June 1954) is an Indian theatre director, playwright, actor and theatre educator associated with Hindi theatre. He is the founder and artistic director of Yatri Theatre, a Mumbai-based Hindi theatre group established in 1979.

Over a career spanning more than four decades, Katare has directed numerous stage productions in Hindi theatre and has also worked as a playwright, actor and theatre educator.

In recognition of his contribution to Indian theatre, he received the Sangeet Natak Akademi Award for Direction in Theatre for the year 2024.

== Early life and education ==
Katare was born on 16 June 1954 in Datia, Madhya Pradesh. He later moved to Mumbai to pursue a career in theatre.

He studied acting at Filmalaya Acting School in Mumbai, where he completed a diploma in professional film acting. During this period, he developed an interest in theatre, which led him to establish Yatri Theatre in 1979.

== Theatre career ==
Katare founded Yatri Theatre in January 1979, a Mumbai-based Hindi theatre group established to stage Hindi-language productions. The group's inaugural production was Ek Tha Gadha urf Alaadad Khan by Sharad Joshi, staged at Prithvi Theatre on 16 January 1979.

Prithvi Theatre became closely associated with Katare's career. In interviews, he has described it as the venue where Yatri Theatre began and where many of the company's productions were first staged.

As Yatri Theatre developed during the 1980s, Katare broadened the company's repertoire to include adaptations of contemporary Indian plays alongside original Hindi productions. During this period, the group established itself as a regular presence in Mumbai's theatre circuit through performances at venues such as Prithvi Theatre and later the National Centre for the Performing Arts (NCPA).

During the 1980s and 1990s, Katare directed productions of works by playwrights including Sharad Joshi, Vijay Tendulkar, Jaywant Dalvi, Vasant Kanetkar and K. P. Saxena, alongside original Hindi plays written by himself.

His productions have included social comedies, family dramas, children's theatre, literary adaptations and experimental works. In addition to directing, he has written, designed and produced several original Hindi plays.

Among his later productions are Perfect Family (2020), Jeena Isi Ka Naam Hai (2022), a biographical play based on the life of Padma Shri recipient Dr. Mukesh Batra, Phone Pe (2025), and the children's play Aaya Re Aaya AI Aaya (2026).

Katare's directing has included original Hindi plays, adaptations of Marathi and other Indian literary works, children's theatre, comedy, social drama and experimental productions. His productions have been staged at venues including Prithvi Theatre and the National Centre for the Performing Arts (NCPA) in Mumbai.

Among the playwrights whose works he has directed are Sharad Joshi, Vijay Tendulkar, Jaywant Dalvi, Vasant Kanetkar, K. P. Saxena and Dr. Kusum Kumar, alongside his own original plays.

Over the course of his career, Katare expanded Yatri Theatre's repertoire from adaptations of established literary works to original Hindi plays, children's theatre and contemporary social comedies. Independent coverage has noted the group's sustained presence in Mumbai's Hindi theatre scene through annual theatre festivals and regular productions spanning several decades.

== Theatre education and workshops ==
Katare has conducted theatre workshops for children and adults through Yatri Theatre. His workshops have focused on acting and stagecraft, and independent publications have noted his role in training aspiring theatre performers as part of Yatri Theatre's educational activities.

== Selected productions ==
Katare's productions span original Hindi plays, literary adaptations, children's theatre, social comedies and biographical theatre.

His first production with Yatri Theatre was Ek Tha Gadha urf Alaadad Khan by Sharad Joshi, staged at Prithvi Theatre in January 1979.

Among the adaptations directed by Katare are Sakharam Binder by Vijay Tendulkar, Kaal Chakra by Jaywant Dalvi, Chinta Chhod Chintamani by Vasant Kanetkar, Gaj Foot Inch by K. P. Saxena and Raavanleela by Dr. Kusum Kumar.

His original works include Hadh Kar Di Aapne, Jeene Bhi Do Yaaro, Perfect Family, Phone Pe and the children's play Aaya Re Aaya AI Aaya.

In 2022, he wrote, designed and directed Jeena Isi Ka Naam Hai, a biographical stage production based on the life of Padma Shri recipient Dr. Mukesh Batra.

== Recognition and reception ==
Independent publications have described Katare as a significant contributor to contemporary Hindi theatre in Mumbai through his work with Yatri Theatre. His productions have been noted for combining popular entertainment with socially relevant themes, and for sustaining regular Hindi theatre programming over several decades.

Writers have also noted Yatri Theatre's role in maintaining a regular Hindi theatre presence in Mumbai through annual theatre festivals, new productions and theatre workshops.

== Selected works ==
Katare's work as a theatre director and playwright includes original Hindi plays, literary adaptations, children's theatre and biographical theatre.

Among his original plays are Jeene Bhi Do Yaaro, Perfect Family, Phone Pe and Aaya Re Aaya AI Aaya. His adaptations include Kaal Chakra by Jaywant Dalvi, Chinta Chhod Chintamani by Vasant Kanetkar, Tillu Ki Dulhaniya (also staged as Gaj Foot Inch) by K. P. Saxena, and Raavanleela by Dr. Kusum Kumar. In 2022, he wrote, designed and directed Jeena Isi Ka Naam Hai, a biographical play based on the life of Dr. Mukesh Batra.

== Awards and honours ==
In 2026, Katare was named a recipient of the Sangeet Natak Akademi Award for Direction in Theatre for the year 2024. The award, presented by the Sangeet Natak Akademi, India's National Academy of Music, Dance and Drama, is among the country's highest national honours in the performing arts.

== Theatre productions ==
=== As an actor and director ===
- Ek Masheen Jawani Ki (1979)
- Ek Tha Gadha (1979)
- Qasai Banda (1979)
- Phandi (1980)
- Arre Natwarlal (1980)
- Hai Padosan (1980)
- Rahasya (1981)
- Chor Ke Ghar Mor (1982)
- Danga (1983)
- Govinda Ala Re (1983)
- Shabash Banchharam (1984)
- Sakharam Binder (1985)
- Inse Miliye (1985)
- Unse Mili Nazar (1986)
- Purush (1986)
- Aao Na (1987)
- Jhamele Mein Jhamela (1987)
- Prem Nagar Ki Dagar (1988)
- Chakra (1988)
- Khuda Bachaye Aurat Se (1989)
- Savita Damodar Paranjpe (1989)
- Dilli Uncha Sunti Hai (1991)
- Abhi To Main Jawan Hoon (1992)
- Jaako Rakhe Saiyaan (1993)
- Bhaag Chalein (1993)
- Kaal Chakra (1994)
- Jee Huzoor (1995)
- Doondhte Reh Jaoge (1996)
- Hadh Kar Di Aapne (2000)
- Yeh Kahan Aa Gaye Hum (1997)
- Mann Karta Hai (1998)
- Ladoo Gopal (1999)
- Mahasagar ( 1999)
- Jaane Do Na (2000)
- Pajee Kahin Ka (2000)
- Rani Ki Kahani (2003)
- Aankhon Aankhon Mein (2004)
- Zaraa Inse Miliye (2004)
- Chandu Ki Chachi (2005)
- Chinta Chhod Chintamani (2008)
- Dadaji Kahein (2009)
- Gaj Foot Inch (2009)
- Baap re Baap (2009)
- Raavanleela (2010)
- Ladoo Gopal
- Yeh Jo Dil Hai na
- Halla Bol
- Teri Meri Prem Kahani
- Magic If
- Bubblegum Boy
- Inspector Matadeen Chand Per (2019)
- Heroine Banoongi Main
- Jeene Bhi Do Yaaro
- Genius Chor (2018)
- Yeh Tera Dil Yeh Mera Dil (2017)
- Perfect Family (2020)
- Jaa Jee le Apni Zindagi (2022)
- Babuji Dheere chalna (2023)
- Raat Baaki hai (2024)
- Ek Lekhak ki Maut (2024)
- Vikram Rathore (2025)
- Phone Pe (2025)
- Aaya Re Aaya AI Aaya (2026)

Forthcoming Production

- Daroga Babu
