= Satish Shah =

Indian actor and comedian (1951–2025)

Padma Shri Satish Shah
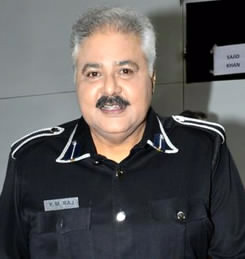
- Shah in 2014
- Born: Satish Ravilal Shah; 25 June 1951; Bombay, Bombay State, India
- Died: 25 October 2025 (aged 74); Mumbai, Maharashtra, India
- Occupations: Actor; comedian
- Years active: 1976–2025
- Spouse: Madhu Shah (m. 1982)
- Awards: Full list

Satish Ravilal Shah (25 June 1951 – 25 October 2025) was an Indian actor and comedian, best known for his iconic comic roles in films such as Jaane Bhi Do Yaaro (1983), Main Hoon Na (2004), Kal Ho Naa Ho (2003), Fanaa (2006), and Om Shanti Om (2007) and television series such as Yeh Jo Hai Zindagi (1984), and Sarabhai vs Sarabhai (2004) for which he won the ITA Award for Best Actor in a Comic Role and the Indian Telly Award for Best Actor in a Comic Role.

In 2008, he co-judged Comedy Circus alongside Archana Puran Singh. In 2015, he was appointed a member of the Film and Television Institute of India (FTII) society.

== Early life ==
Satish Shah was born in Mumbai, Maharashtra, on 25 June 1951. His father's family was from Mandvi, Gujarat. He did his schooling at New Era School in Mumbai and then completed his graduation from St. Xavier's College, Mumbai. He is an alumnus of the Film and Television Institute of India in Pune, where he received formal training in acting.

== Career ==
Shah graduated from Film and Television Institute of India in 1976. He was known for his roles in the 1984 sitcom Yeh Jo Hai Zindagi directed by Kundan Shah and Manjul Sinha, where he played 55 different characters in 55 episodes, and the character of Prakash in the television serial Zee TV - Filmy Chakkar in 1995, who he played in 50 episodes. He also starred in the 2004 television show Sarabhai vs Sarabhai as Indravadhan Sarabhai. In both Filmy Chakkar and Sarabhai vs Sarabhai, his pairing was opposite Ratna Pathak Shah. In 1997, he played the lead role in Ghar Jamai for 80 episodes along with the serial All The Best with Swaroop Sampat for 109 episodes for DD2.

He played the role of Municipal Commissioner D'Mello in the 1984 movie Jaane Bhi Do Yaaro directed by Kundan Shah. Considered to be primarily a comedian, he has portrayed various character roles in his career throughout the 1980s, 1990s and 2000s, starting with his first movie Arvind Desai Ki Ajeeb Dastaan in 1978. Apart from his career in Bollywood, he was also a judge of the Comedy Circus.

== Personal life ==
Satish Shah married designer Madhu Shah in 1982. The couple had no children however.

In January 2023, while on a trip to UK, Shah posted a tweet on X, describing the staff at Heathrow Airport questioning on how Shah could afford a first class seat, to which he replied with a proud smile "because we are Indians". While several twitter users praised Shah for standing up to this remark, many twitter users criticized the racist behavior of the airport staff, and the official X account of Heathrow Airport responded to Shah's tweet with an apology of the encounter.

== Illness and death ==
During the COVID-19 pandemic in 2020, Satish Shah was diagnosed with COVID-19. He was admitted to Lilavati Hospital in Mumbai on 20 July and discharged on 28 July after making a full recovery.

On 25 October 2025, Shah died of cardiac arrest at the age of 74. He was cremated the same day, and numerous celebrities attended his last rites His co-stars and producers of Sarabhai vs Sarabhai sang the title song of the show as a tribute to him during his cremation.

Ratna Pathak Shah paid tribute to Shah by writing an op-ed for The Indian Express, calling him "a maestro of the [comedy] genre." Prime Minister Narendra Modi in a post on X, called him "true legend of Indian entertainment." He further wrote that Shah's "effortless humour and iconic performances brought laughter into countless lives." Numerous members of the entertainment industry also paid tribute to Shah including Shahrukh Khan, Priyanka Chopra, Kareena Kapoor Khan, Hrithik Roshan, Karan Johar, R Madhavan, Anupam Kher, Farah Khan, Madhur Bhandarkar, and Johnny Lever.

== Filmography ==
=== Films ===
Year	Film	Role	Other notes
1976	Bonga	Robber	short
1978	Arvind Desai Ki Ajeeb Dastaan		
1979	Gaman		
1981	Umrao Jaan	Dilawar	
1981	Albert Pinto Ko Gussa Kyon Ata Hai		
1982	Shakti	Ravi	
1983	Jaane Bhi Do Yaaro	Commissioner D'Mello	
1984	Meri Kahanii	Dolan	
1984	Purana Mandir	Saanga	
1986	Peechha Karro		
1986	Main Balwan	Peter	
1986	Amrit	Ram Charan	
1986	Anokha Rishta	Nasir Khan	
1987	Gammat Jammat	Police Inspector	Marathi film
1987	Apne Apne		
1987	Kalyug Aur Ramayan		
1987	Jaan Hatheli Pe		
1987	Param Dharam	Toluram	
1988	Ek Hi Maqsad	Mad Poet	
1988	Peechha Karo	Giri Harihara	
1988	Maalamaal	Govinda Sakharam Godbole	
1988	Aage Ki Soch		
1988	Maar Dhaad		
1988	Veerana	Hitcock	
1988	Ghar Ghar Ki Kahani	Asha's Brother	
1988	Hero Hiralal	Bhagwan	
1989	Saath Saath	Satish Shah	
1989	Shakti	Satish Rai	
1989	Ardh Satya	Dacoit	
1989	Mohan Joshi Hazir Ho!		
1989	Anjaam		
1989	Bhagwan Dada	Bijli's Patron	
1989	Meri Kahani		
1989	Aag Aur Shola	Vidyasagar	
1989	Love 86	Hawaldar Sandow	
1989	Ghar Mein Ram Gali Mein Shyam	Mr. Srivastav	
1989	Khoj		
1989	Bade Ghar Ki Beti		
1989	Sachche Ka Bol Bala	Akram	
1989	Dost Garibon Ka	Barkat Ali Khan / Bholeram	
1989	Purani Haveli	Mangu and Kala Gang	
1989	Mahaadev		
1989	Tere Bina Kya Jeena		
1989	Hisaab Khoon Ka		
1989	Ladaai	Radheshyam Pandit	
1990	Meri Lalkaar		
1990	Naag Nagin	Champalal, Chamdewala	
1990	Apmaan Ki Aag		
1990	Shaitani Ilaaka	Funtoosh	
1990	Hatim Tai	Nazrul	
1990	Mera Pati Sirf Mera Hai		
1990	Jungle Love		
1990	Chor Pe Mor		
1990	Amba		
1990	Thanedaar	Police Constable Rangiley	
1991	Jaan Pehchan		
1991	Baharon Ki Manzil		
1991	Naamcheen	Satiya	
1991	Mehandi Ban Gayi Khoon		
1991	Jungle Queen		
1991	Patthar Ke Insaan	Ram Singh, Chauffeur	
1991	Benaam Badsha	Ganpat	
1991	Narsimha	Anil Saxena	
1991	Dharam Sankat		
1992	Abhi Abhi	Shastri	
1992	Phoolwati		
1992	Aaj Ka Goonda Raaj	Jailor	
1992	Dilwale Kabhi Na Hare	Reshamlal	
1992	Touhean	Dr. Jatin	
1993	Kabhi Haan Kabhi Naa	Simon Gonsalves	
1993	Wajva Re Wajva	Babulal Jain	Marathi film
1993	Aaja Meri Jaan	Police Inspector	
1993	Bomb Blast	Police Inspector Anil Chhatpate	
1993	Aashiq Awara	Inspector	
1993	Sainik	Alka's father	
1993	Boy Friend	Commissioner	
1994	Ghar Ki Izzat		
1994	Anokha Prem Yudh		
1994	Hum Aapke Hain Koun..!	Doctor	
1994	Stuntman	Mastan	
1994	Teesra Kaun	Bingo	
1995	Baazi	Editor Roy	
1995	Dilwale Dulhaniya Le Jayenge	Ajit Singh	
1995	Akele Hum Akele Tum	Gulbadan Kumar	
1996	Saajan Chale Sasural	Ram Pyara	
1997	Aar Ya Paar	Jagdish	
1997	Judwaa	Havaldar/Inspector	
1997	Hero No. 1	Pappi	
1997	Agni Chakra		
1997	Himalay Putra	Major Mathur	
1997	Mere Sapno Ki Rani	Subhash	
1997	Ghulam-E-Mustafa	Qawwali Singer	
1998	Dhoondte Reh Jaaoge!	Seth Motichand	
1998	Saat Rang Ke Sapne	Baldev	
1998	Gharwali Baharwali	Anand Rastogi	
1998	Tirchhi Topiwale	Gokul Pai	
1998	Prem Aggan		
1998	Shanti Shanti Shanti	Anantha Murthy	Kannada film
1999	Anari No.1	Sattar	
1999	Hum Saath Saath Hain	Pritam	
2000	Kaho Naa Pyaar Hai	Rohits Landlord	
2000	Phir Bhi Dil Hai Hindustani	Kaka Chowdhry	
2000	Saali Poori Gharwali		
2000	Har Dil Jo Pyar Karega	Mahesh Hirwani	
2002	Kitne Door Kitne Paas	Veer Singh/Jeet Singh Rathod/Bhanwar Singh	
2002	Pyar Ki Dhun	Kuber	
2002	Om Jai Jagadish		
2002	Mujhse Dosti Karoge	Mr. Sahani	
2002	Jeena Sirf Merre Liye	Editor/Publisher	
2002	Saathiya	Om Sehgal	
2003	Tujhe Meri Kasam	Satish Khanna	
2003	Love at Times Square	Gujarati Motel Owner	
2003	Ishq Vishk	Mr. Mathur	
2003	Chalte Chalte	Manubhai	
2003	Kuch Naa Kaho	Rakesh (Raj's Uncle)	
2003	Kal Ho Naa Ho	Karshan Bhai Patel	
2003	Out of Control	Flower	
2004	Masti	Dr. Suresh Kapadia	
2004	Main Hoon Na	Prof. Madhav Rasai	
2004	Mujhse Shaadi Karogi	Suraj Prakash	
2004	Kis Kiski Kismat	Rafsanjani	
2005	Bachke Rehna Re Baba	Gutkha Baron Mansukhani	
2005	Pyaar Mein Twist	Karam Khanna	
2005	Ramji Londonwaley	Immigration officer Vishambal Mehra	
2005	Shaadi No. 1	Kothari	
2006	Fanaa	Colonel	
2006	Love Ke Chakkar Mein	Neha's Father	
2006	Panga Na Lo	Karsanbhai Shah	
2006	Sandwich	Chelaramani	
2006	Dil Laga Ke Dekho		
2006	Deewana Tere Naam Ka		
2007	Om Shanti Om	Partho Das	
2007	Just Married	Chaturvedi	
2008	Bhootnath	Principal J.J. Irani	
2008	Dhoom Dadakka	Jignesh	
2008	De Taali		
2009	Horn 'OK' Pleassss		
2009	Mr. Fraud		
2009	Kal Kissne Dekha	Kapoor	
2010	Chance Pe Dance	School Principal	
2010	Jaane Kahan Se Aayi Hai	Rajesh's Father	
2010	Banda Yeh Bindaas Hai		
2010	Milenge Milenge	Trilok Kapoor	
2010	Khichdi: The Movie	Ishwar Buddhidev	
2011	Ra.One	Iyer Uncle	
2012	Gola Berij	Peston Kaka	Marathi-language film
2012	A New Love Ishtory	DD	
2013	Ramaiya Vastavaiya	Krishnakant	
2013	Club 60	Mansukhani	
2014	Humshakals	Mr. Y.M. Raj	

=== Television ===
Year	Title	Role	Note	Ref.
1984–1986	Yeh Jo Hai Zindagi	Various characters		
1993–1995	Filmi Chakkar	Prakash Jaiswal		
1994	P.A. Sahab	P.A. Sahab		
1997–1998	Ghar Jamai	Vishamber Mehra		
1999	Top 10	Host/presenter		
2004–2006; 2017	Sarabhai vs Sarabhai	Indravadan Sarabhai		
2007–2008	Comedy Circus	Judge		
2023	United Kacche	Jogu Chimanlal Patel		

== Awards ==
Year	Award	Category	Work	Result
1985	Filmfare Awards	Best Performance in a Comic Role	Jaane Bhi Do Yaaro	Nominated
2005	Indian Television Academy Awards	Best Actor in a Comic Role	Sarabhai vs Sarabhai	Won
2005	Indian Telly Awards	Best Actor in a Comic Role	Sarabhai vs Sarabhai	Nominated
2006	Indian Telly Awards	Best Actor in a Comic Role	Sarabhai vs Sarabhai	Won
2017	Indian Television Academy Awards	Best Actor - Web Series	Sarabhai vs Sarabhai	Won

In 2026, he has been awarded with Padma Shri by the government of India.
