= Kundan Shah =

Indian film director and writer (1947–2017)

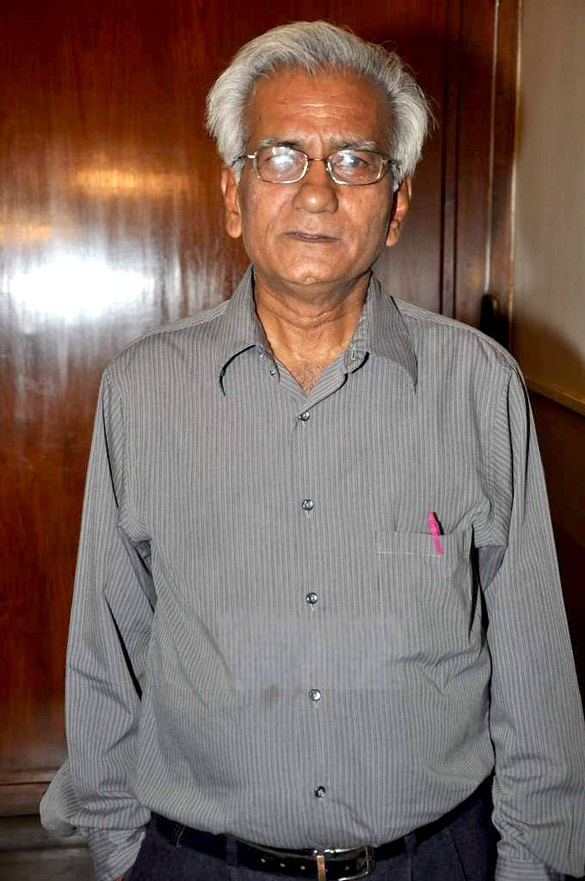
- Shah in 2015
- Born: 19 October 1947; Bombay, Bombay Province, India
- Died: 7 October 2017 (aged 69); Mumbai, Maharashtra, India
- Occupations: Director; screenwriter
- Years active: 1983–2014
- Awards: 1983 Indira Gandhi Award for Best Debut Film of a Director – Jaane Bhi Do Yaaro; 1994 Filmfare Critics Award for Best Movie – Kabhi Haan Kabhi Naa

Kundan Shah (19 October 1947 – 7 October 2017) was an Indian film director and writer. He is known for his comedy classic Jaane Bhi Do Yaaro (1983) and his 1986–1987 TV series Nukkad with Saeed Akhtar Mirza.

== Biography ==
Kundan Shah was born in a Gujarati family.

Shah studied direction at the Film and Television Institute of India in Pune and he developed an interest in the comedy genre.

His directorial debut was the comedy film Jaane Bhi Do Yaaro (a.k.a. Who Pays the Piper) in 1983. He also was the co-writer of the film, with Satish Kaushik. The film introduced Indian cinema to satirical comedy for the first time and was well accepted as not being slapstick.

Shah then started to work in television. He was one of the directors of the popular sitcom Yeh Jo Hai Zindagi, which started telecast in August 1984. He became a partner of Iskra, a company founded by Saeed Akhtar Mirza, Aziz Mirza and others. In 1985–1986 he directed the TV series Nukkad (street) along with Saeed Akhtar Mirza. The serial was another folk comedy dealing with the routine life of street youngsters. In 1987 he directed another television serial named "Manoranjan", the comedy serial was based on film industry and became an instant hit. In 1988, he started directing sitcom, Wagle Ki Duniya, based on cartoonist, R. K. Laxman's character, the common man, starring Anjan Srivastav.

After directing several serials, Shah took a long break of 7 years from cinema.

Shah made his comeback to cinema in 1993. He directed the famous Kabhi Haan Kabhi Naa and wrote the screenplay for the film. The film was another comic love story but it also displayed new aspects to its credit – it was the first time that the hero in the film was an absolute loser. The film starred Shahrukh Khan in one of his first roles. The film was much acclaimed and both Shah and Khan were appreciated for their work. In 1994, Shah won the Filmfare Critics Award for Best Movie for the film. He was the first filmmaker to win this award.

In 1998, Shah directed another acclaimed film, Kya Kehna. Due to delay, the film released in 2000 and became the surprise hit of the year. The film dealt with the socially controversial issue of single parenthood and premarital pregnancy. Preity Zinta gave a critically appreciated performance in the lead role of a teenage single-mother who tries to overcome the values of her society. This was to be her debut film but, due to the delay in release, she instead debuted in Dil Se..., followed by Soldier. The film also starred Saif Ali Khan and Chandrachur Singh.

Shah's next releases were Hum To Mohabbat Karega in 2000, starring Bobby Deol and Karisma Kapoor, Dil Hai Tumhaara in 2002, starring Rekha, Preity Zinta, Arjun Rampal, Mahima Chaudhry and Jimmy Sheirgill, and Ek Se Badhkar Ek in 2004, starring Suniel Shetty and Raveena Tandon. While the second film received generally positive reviews, none of the films fared well at the box office.

== Awards ==
- National Film Award – Indira Gandhi Award for Best Debut Film of a Director – Jaane Bhi Do Yaaro
- Filmfare Award for Best Film (Critics) – Kabhi Haan Kabhi Naa

== Filmography ==
=== Films ===
Year	Title	Writer	Director	Notes	Ref.
1976	Bonga	Yes	Yes	short	
1983	Jaane Bhi Do Yaaro	Yes	Yes		
1986	Khamosh	Yes	No		
1993	Kabhi Haan Kabhi Naa	Yes	Yes		
2000	Kya Kehna	No	Yes		
2000	Hum To Mohabbat Karega	Yes	Yes		
2002	Dil Hai Tumhaara	Yes	Yes		
2004	Ek Se Badhkar Ek	No	Yes		
2005	The Three Sisters	No	Yes		
2014	P Se PM Tak	Yes	Yes		

=== Television ===
Year	Title	Writer	Director	Notes	Ref.
1984–1985	Yeh Jo Hai Zindagi	No	Yes		
1986–1987	Nukkad	Yes	Yes		
1988–1990	Wagle Ki Duniya	No	Yes		
1989–1990	Circus	No	Yes		
1999	Wagle Ki Nayi Duniya	No	Yes		
2001–2002	Persai Kehte Hain	Yes	Yes		
