= Morani =

Morani may refer to:

== People ==
- Alessia Morani (born 1976), Italian politician
- Aly Morani, Indian film producer
- Karim Morani, Indian film producer
- Lucky Morani, Indian fashion designer, model, and actress
- Zoa Morani (born 1988), Indian model and actress

== Places ==
- Morani, Studeničani, North Macedonia
- Morani (Tutin), Serbia
