= Filmfare Award for Best Film =

Awards for best film

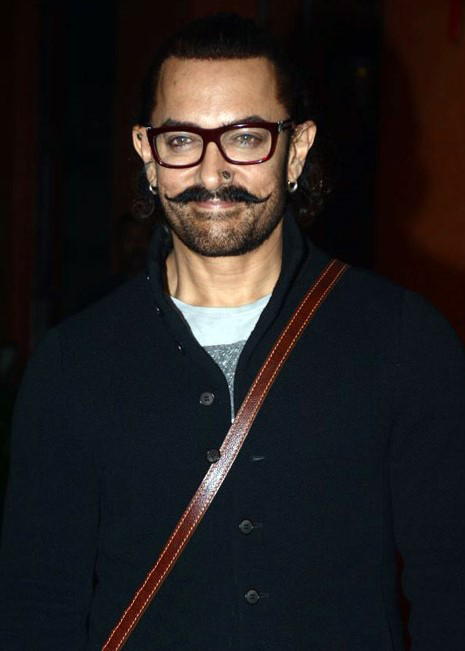
- The 70th recipients: Aamir Khan (pictured), Kiran Rao and Jyoti Deshpande
- Awarded for: Best Film
- Country: India
- Presented by: Filmfare
- First award: Do Bigha Zamin (1954)
- Currently held by: Laapataa Ladies (2025)
- Website: Filmfare Awards

The Filmfare Award for Best Film is given by the Filmfare magazine as part of its annual Filmfare Awards for Hindi films.

The award was first given in 1954. Here is a list of the award winners and the nominees for the respective years. Each individual entry shows the title followed by the production company and the producer.

Yash Raj Films has produced 18 films that have been nominated, the most for any production house. It also shares the most wins at 4 along with Bimal Roy Productions and UTV Motion Pictures. Yash Chopra has been the producer of all of the winning films of Yash Raj Films, and Bimal Roy of all of the winning films of Bimal Roy Productions, thus making them the producers with the most wins. Sanjay Leela Bhansali has directed 5 winning films, the most for any director. Aamir Khan has starred in 9 winning films which is the most for any actor in a leading role. Nutan, Madhuri Dixit, Rani Mukerji, Aishwarya Rai, and Alia Bhatt have each starred in 3 winning films which is the most for any actress in a leading role.

== Winners and nominees ==
=== 1950s ===
Year	Film	Studio(s)
1954 (1st)
1954 (1st)	Do Bigha Zamin	Bimal Roy Productions
1954 (1st)	No Other Nominees	
1955 (2nd)
1955 (2nd)	Boot Polish	R. K. Films
1955 (2nd)	No Other Nominees	
1956 (3rd)
1956 (3rd)	Jagriti	Filmistan Productions
1956 (3rd)	Azaad	Pakshiraja Studios
1956 (3rd)	Biraj Bahu	Hiten Chaudhary Productions
1957 (4th)
1957 (4th)	Jhanak Jhanak Payal Baaje	Rajkamal Kala Mandir
1957 (4th)	No Other Nominees	
1958 (5th)
1958 (5th)	Mother India	Mehboob Productions
1958 (5th)	No Other Nominees	
1959 (6th)
1959 (6th)	Madhumati	Bimal Roy Productions
1959 (6th)	Sadhna	B. R. Films
1959 (6th)	Talaaq	Anupam Chitra
1960 (7th)
1960 (7th)	Chhoti Bahen	Prasad Studios
1960 (7th)	Anari	L. B. Films
1960 (7th)	Sujata	Bimal Roy Productions

=== 1960s ===
Year	Film	Studio(s)
1961 (8th)
1961 (8th)	Mughal-e-Azam	Sterling Investments
1961 (8th)	Masoom	Bani Rupa Chitra
1961 (8th)	Parakh	Bimal Roy Productions
1962 (9th)
1962 (9th)	Jis Desh Men Ganga Behti Hai	R. K. Films
1962 (9th)	Gunga Jumna	Citizen Films
1962 (9th)	Kanoon	B. R. Films
1963 (10th)
1963 (10th)	Sahib Bibi Aur Ghulam	Guru Dutt Movies Pvt. Ltd.
1963 (10th)	Bees Saal Baad	Geetanjali Pictures
1963 (10th)	Rakhi	Prabhuram Pictures
1964 (11th)
1964 (11th)	Bandini	Bimal Roy Productions
1964 (11th)	Dil Ek Mandir	Chitralaya
1964 (11th)	Gumrah	B. R. Films
1965 (12th)
1965 (12th)	Dosti	Rajshri Productions
1965 (12th)	Sangam	R. K. Films
1965 (12th)	Shehar Aur Sapna	Naya Sansar
1966 (13th)
1966 (13th)	Himalaya Ki God Mein	Shri Prakash Pictures
1966 (13th)	Haqeeqat	Himalaya Films
1966 (13th)	Waqt	B. R. Films
1967 (14th)
1967 (14th)	Guide	Navketan Films
1967 (14th)	Anupama	L. B. Films
1967 (14th)	Mamta	Charu Chitra
1968 (15th)
1968 (15th)	Upkar	V. I. P. Films
1968 (15th)	Mehrban	AVM Productions
1968 (15th)	Milan	Prasad Studios
1969 (16th)
1969 (16th)	Brahmachari	Sippy Films
1969 (16th)	Ankhen	Sagar Art International
1969 (16th)	Neel Kamal	Kalpanalok

=== 1970s ===
Year	Film	Studio(s)
1970 (17th)
1970 (17th)	Aradhana	Shakti Films
1970 (17th)	Aashirwad	Rupam Chitra
1970 (17th)	Jeene Ki Raah	Prasad Studios
1971 (18th)
1971 (18th)	Khilona	Prasad Studios
1971 (18th)	Do Raaste	Raj Khosla Films
1971 (18th)	Pehchaan	Filmnagar
1972 (19th)
1972 (19th)	Anand	Rupam Chitra
1972 (19th)	Mera Naam Joker	R. K. Films
1972 (19th)	Naya Zamana	Pramod Films
1973 (20th)
1973 (20th)	Be-Imaan	Filmnagar
1973 (20th)	Anubhav	Aarohi Film Makers
1973 (20th)	Pakeezah	Mahal Pictures
1974 (21st)
1974 (21st)	Anuraag	Shakti Films
1974 (21st)	Aaj Ki Taaza Khabar	Kiron Productions
1974 (21st)	Bobby	R. K. Films
1974 (21st)	Koshish	Romu N. Sippy and Raj N. Sippy
1974 (21st)	Zanjeer	Prakash Mehra Productions
1975 (22nd)
1975 (22nd)	Rajnigandha	Devki Chitra
1975 (22nd)	Ankur	Blaze Film Enterprises
1975 (22nd)	Garm Hava	Unit 3 mm
1975 (22nd)	Kora Kagaz	Shreeji Films
1975 (22nd)	Roti Kapda Aur Makaan	V.I.P. Films
1976 (23rd)
1976 (23rd)	Deewaar	Trimurti Films
1976 (23rd)	Aandhi	Filmyug
1976 (23rd)	Amanush	Shakti Films
1976 (23rd)	Sanyasi	Filmnagar
1976 (23rd)	Sholay	Sippy Films
1977 (24th)
1977 (24th)	Mausam	Sunandini Pictures
1977 (24th)	Chhoti Si Baat	B. R. Films
1977 (24th)	Chitchor	Rajshri Productions
1977 (24th)	Kabhi Kabhie	Yash Raj Films
1977 (24th)	Tapasya	Rajshri Productions
1978 (25th)
1978 (25th)	Bhumika	Blaze Film Enterprises
1978 (25th)	Amar Akbar Anthony	MKD Films Combine
1978 (25th)	Gharaonda	Climb Films
1978 (25th)	Manthan	Gujarat Milk Co-Op Marketing Federation Ltd.
1978 (25th)	Swami	Jayasarathy Combine
1979 (26th)
1979 (26th)	Main Tulsi Tere Aangan Ki	Raj Khosla Films
1979 (26th)	Ankhiyon Ke Jharokhon Se	Rajshri Productions
1979 (26th)	Muqaddar Ka Sikandar	Prakash Mehra Productions
1979 (26th)	Shatranj Ke Khilari	Suresh Jindal
1979 (26th)	Trishul	Trimurti Films

=== 1980s ===
Year	Film	Studio(s)
1980 (27th)
1980 (27th)	Junoon	Film-Valas
1980 (27th)	Amar Deep	Sujatha International
1980 (27th)	Kaala Patthar	Yash Raj Films
1980 (27th)	Noorie	Yash Raj Films
1980 (27th)	Sargam	N. N. Sippy Productions
1981 (28th)
1981 (28th)	Khubsoorat	Rupam Chitra
1981 (28th)	Aakrosh	Krsna Movies Enterprises
1981 (28th)	Aasha	Filmyug
1981 (28th)	Insaaf Ka Tarazu	B. R. Films
1981 (28th)	Thodisi Bewafaii	Konark Kombine International
1982 (29th)
1982 (29th)	Kalyug	Film-Valas
1982 (29th)	Baseraa	Rose Movies
1982 (29th)	Chakra	Neo Films
1982 (29th)	Chashme Buddoor	PLA Productions
1982 (29th)	Ek Duuje Ke Liye	Prasad Studios
1983 (30th)
1983 (30th)	Shakti	M. R. Productions
1983 (30th)	Bazaar	New Wave Production
1983 (30th)	Nikaah	B. R. Films
1983 (30th)	Prem Rog	R. K. Films
1983 (30th)	Vidhaata	Trimurti Films
1984 (31st)
1984 (31st)	Ardh Satya	Neo Films
1984 (31st)	Arth	Anu Arts
1984 (31st)	Avtaar	Emkay Enterprises
1984 (31st)	Betaab	Vijayta Films – Dharmendra
1984 (31st)	Masoom	Krsna Movies Enterprises
1985 (32nd)
1985 (32nd)	Sparsh	Basu Bhattacharya
1985 (32nd)	Aaj Ki Awaaz	B. R. Films
1985 (32nd)	Jaane Bhi Do Yaaro	National Film Development Corporation of India
1985 (32nd)	Saaransh	Rajshri Productions
1985 (32nd)	Sharaabi	Chaudhary Enterprises, Prakash Mehra Productions
1986 (33rd)
1986 (33rd)	Ram Teri Ganga Maili	R. K. Films
1986 (33rd)	Arjun	Cineyugg Films
1986 (33rd)	Ghulami	Nadiadwala Sons
1986 (33rd)	Meri Jung	N. N. Sippy Productions
1986 (33rd)	Saagar	Sippy Films
1986 (33rd)	Tawaif	Sunrise Productions
1987	No Award	
1988	No Award	
1989 (34th)
1989 (34th)	Qayamat Se Qayamat Tak	Nasir Hussain Films
1989 (34th)	Khoon Bhari Maang	Film Kraft
1989 (34th)	Tezaab	N. Chandra Productions

=== 1990s ===
Year	Film	Studio(s)
1990 (35th)
1990 (35th)	Maine Pyar Kiya	Rajshri Productions – Tarachand Barjatya
1990 (35th)	Chandni	Yash Raj Films – Yash Chopra
1990 (35th)	Parinda	Vinod Chopra Productions – Vidhu Vinod Chopra
1990 (35th)	Ram Lakhan	Mukta Arts – Ashok Ghai, Subhash Ghai
1990 (35th)	Salaam Bombay!	Mirabai Films – Mira Nair
1991 (36th)
1991 (36th)	Ghayal	Vijayta Films – Dharmendra
1991 (36th)	Agneepath	Dharma Productions – Yash Johar
1991 (36th)	Dil	Maruti International – Indra Kumar, Ashok Thakeria
1991 (36th)	Pratibandh	Geetha Arts – Allu Aravind
1992 (37th)
1992 (37th)	Lamhe	Yash Raj Films – Yash Chopra
1992 (37th)	Dil Hai Ki Manta Nahin	Vishesh Films / T-Series – Mukesh Bhatt, Gulshan Kumar
1992 (37th)	Henna	R. K. Films – Randhir Kapoor
1992 (37th)	Saajan	Divya Films International – Sudhakar Bokade
1992 (37th)	Saudagar	Mukta Arts – Subhash Ghai
1993 (38th)
1993 (38th)	Jo Jeeta Wohi Sikandar	Nasir Hussain Films – Nasir Hussain
1993 (38th)	Beta	Maruti International – Indra Kumar, Ashok Thakeria
1993 (38th)	Khuda Gawah	Glamour Films – Nazir Ahmed Khan, Manoj Desai
1994 (39th)
1994 (39th)	Hum Hain Rahi Pyar Ke	Tahir Hussain Enterprises – Tahir Hussain
1994 (39th)	Aankhen	Chiragdeep International – Pahlaj Nihalani
1994 (39th)	Baazigar	United Seven Combines – Ganesh Jain
1994 (39th)	Damini	Cineyug Entertainment – Aly Morani, Karim Morani, Bunty Soorma
1994 (39th)	Khalnayak	Mukta Arts – Subhash Ghai
1995 (40th)
1995 (40th)	Hum Aapke Hain Koun..!	Rajshri Productions – Ajit Kumar Barjatya, Kamal Kumar Barjatya, Rajkumar Barjatya
1995 (40th)	1942: A Love Story	Vinod Chopra Productions – Vidhu Vinod Chopra
1995 (40th)	Andaz Apna Apna	Vinay Pictures – Vinay Kumar Sinha
1995 (40th)	Krantiveer	Mehul Movies – Mehul Kumar
1995 (40th)	Mohra	Trimurti Films – Gulshan Rai
1996 (41st)
1996 (41st)	Dilwale Dulhania Le Jayenge	Yash Raj Films – Yash Chopra
1996 (41st)	Akele Hum Akele Tum	United Seven Combines – Ratan Jain
1996 (41st)	Karan Arjun	Film Kraft – Rakesh Roshan
1996 (41st)	Raja	Maruti International – Indra Kumar, Ashok Thakeria
1996 (41st)	Rangeela	Varma Corporation – Ram Gopal Varma
1997 (42nd)
1997 (42nd)	Raja Hindustani	Cineyug Entertainment – Aly Morani, Karim Morani, Bunty Soorma
1997 (42nd)	Agni Sakshi	Neha Films – Binda Thackeray
1997 (42nd)	Bandit Queen	Kaleidoscope Entertainment – Bobby Bedi
1997 (42nd)	Khamoshi: The Musical	Polygram Filmed Entertainment – Sibte Hassan Rizvi
1997 (42nd)	Maachis	Pan Pictures – R. V. Pandit
1998 (43rd)
1998 (43rd)	Dil To Pagal Hai	Yash Raj Films – Yash Chopra
1998 (43rd)	Border	J. P. Films – J. P. Dutta
1998 (43rd)	Gupt	Trimurti Films – Gulshan Rai
1998 (43rd)	Pardes	Mukta Arts – Subhash Ghai
1998 (43rd)	Virasat	M. R. Productions – Mushir Alam, Mohammad Riaz
1999 (44th)
1999 (44th)	Kuch Kuch Hota Hai	Dharma Productions – Yash Johar
1999 (44th)	Ghulam	Vishesh Films – Mukesh Bhatt
1999 (44th)	Pyaar Kiya To Darna Kya	G. S. Entertainment – Sohail Khan
1999 (44th)	Pyaar To Hona Hi Tha	Baba Films – Gordhan Tanwani
1999 (44th)	Satya	Varma Corporation – Ram Gopal Varma

=== 2000s ===
Year	Film	Studio(s)
2000 (45th)
2000 (45th)	Hum Dil De Chuke Sanam	Bhansali Films – Sanjay Leela Bhansali
2000 (45th)	Biwi No.1	Puja Films – Vashu Bhagnani
2000 (45th)	Sarfarosh	Cinematt Pictures – John Matthew Matthan
2000 (45th)	Taal	Mukta Arts – Subhash Ghai
2000 (45th)	Vaastav	Adishakti Films – Deepak Nikhalje
2001 (46th)
2001 (46th)	Kaho Naa... Pyaar Hai	Film Kraft – Rakesh Roshan
2001 (46th)	Dhadkan	United Seven Combines – Ratan Jain
2001 (46th)	Josh	United Seven Combines – Ganesh Jain
2001 (46th)	Mission Kashmir	Vinod Chopra Productions – Vidhu Vinod Chopra
2001 (46th)	Mohabbatein	Yash Raj Films – Yash Chopra
2002 (47th)
2002 (47th)	Lagaan	Aamir Khan Productions – Aamir Khan
2002 (47th)	Asoka	Dreamz Unlimited – Shahrukh Khan, Juhi Chawla
2002 (47th)	Dil Chahta Hai	Excel Entertainment Pvt. Ltd. – Ritesh Sidhwani
2002 (47th)	Gadar: Ek Prem Katha	Zee Telefilms – Nitin Keni
2002 (47th)	Kabhi Khushi Kabhie Gham	Dharma Productions – Yash Johar
2003 (48th)
2003 (48th)	Devdas	Mega Bollywood – Bharat Shah
2003 (48th)	Company	Varma Corporation – Ram Gopal Varma
2003 (48th)	Humraaz	Venus Films – Ratan Jain, Ganesh Jain
2003 (48th)	Kaante	White Feather Films / Pritish Nandy Communications / Film Club – Sanjay Gupta, Lawrence Mortorff, Pritish Nandy, Raju Patel
2003 (48th)	Raaz	Vishesh Films – Mukesh Bhatt
2004 (49th)
2004 (49th)	Koi... Mil Gaya	Film Kraft – Rakesh Roshan
2004 (49th)	Baghban	B. R. Films – B. R. Chopra
2004 (49th)	Kal Ho Naa Ho	Dharma Productions – Yash Johar, Karan Johar
2004 (49th)	Munna Bhai M.B.B.S.	Vinod Chopra Productions – Vidhu Vinod Chopra
2004 (49th)	Tere Naam	MD Productions – Sunil Manchanda, Mukesh Talreja
2004 (49th)	Andaaz	Shree Krishna International – Suneel Darshan
2005 (50th)
2005 (50th)	Veer-Zaara	Yash Raj Films – Yash Chopra, Aditya Chopra
2005 (50th)	Dhoom	Yash Raj Films – Yash Chopra, Aditya Chopra
2005 (50th)	Hum Tum	Yash Raj Films – Yash Chopra
2005 (50th)	Main Hoon Na	Red Chillies Entertainment – Shahrukh Khan, Gauri Khan
2005 (50th)	Swades	Ashutosh Gowariker Productions – Ashutosh Gowariker
2006 (51st)
2006 (51st)	Black	SLB Films – Sanjay Leela Bhansali
2006 (51st)	Bunty Aur Babli	Yash Raj Films – Yash Chopra, Aditya Chopra
2006 (51st)	No Entry	S. K. Films Enterprises – Boney Kapoor, Surinder Kapoor
2006 (51st)	Page 3	Lighthouse Entertainment – Bobby Pushkarna, Kavita Pushkarna
2006 (51st)	Parineeta	Vinod Chopra Productions – Vidhu Vinod Chopra
2007 (52nd)
2007 (52nd)	Rang De Basanti	UTV Motion Pictures, Rakeysh Omprakash Mehra Pictures – Ronnie Screwvala, Rakeysh Omprakash Mehra
2007 (52nd)	Dhoom 2	Yash Raj Films – Yash Chopra, Aditya Chopra
2007 (52nd)	Don	Excel Entertainment Pvt. Ltd. – Ritesh Sidhwani, Farhan Akhtar
2007 (52nd)	Kabhi Alvida Naa Kehna	Dharma Productions – Hiroo Yash Johar
2007 (52nd)	Krrish	Film Kraft – Rakesh Roshan
2007 (52nd)	Lage Raho Munna Bhai	Vinod Chopra Productions – Vidhu Vinod Chopra
2008 (53rd)
2008 (53rd)	Taare Zameen Par	Aamir Khan Productions – Aamir Khan
2008 (53rd)	Chak De! India	Yash Raj Films – Yash Chopra, Aditya Chopra
2008 (53rd)	Guru	Madras Talkies – Mani Ratnam, G. Srinivasan
2008 (53rd)	Jab We Met	Shree Ashtavinayak Cine Vision – Dhillin Mehta
2008 (53rd)	Om Shanti Om	Red Chillies Entertainment – Shahrukh Khan, Gauri Khan
2009 (54th)
2009 (54th)	Jodhaa Akbar	Ashutosh Gowariker Productions, UTV Motion Pictures – Ashutosh Gowariker, Ronnie Screwvala
2009 (54th)	Dostana	Dharma Productions – Karan Johar, Prashant Shah
2009 (54th)	Ghajini	Geetha Arts – Allu Aravind, Tagore Madhu, Madhu Mantena
2009 (54th)	Jaane Tu... Ya Jaane Na	Aamir Khan Productions – Aamir Khan, Mansoor Khan
2009 (54th)	Rab Ne Bana Di Jodi	Yash Raj Films – Yash Chopra, Aditya Chopra
2009 (54th)	Rock On!!	Excel Entertainment Pvt. Ltd. – Farhan Akhtar, Ritesh Sidhwani

=== 2010s ===
Year	Film	Studio(s)
2010 (55th)
2010 (55th)	3 Idiots	Vinod Chopra Productions – Vidhu Vinod Chopra
2010 (55th)	Dev.D	UTV Motion Pictures – Ronnie Screwvala
2010 (55th)	Kaminey	UTV Motion Pictures – Ronnie Screwvala
2010 (55th)	Love Aaj Kal	Illuminati Films – Saif Ali Khan, Dinesh Vijan
2010 (55th)	Paa	AB Corp Ltd. – Amitabh Bachchan, Abhishek Bachchan, Sunil Manchanda
2010 (55th)	Wake Up Sid	Dharma Productions – Karan Johar, Hiroo Yash Johar
2011 (56th)
2011 (56th)	Dabangg	Arbaaz Khan Productions & Shree Ashtavinayak Cine Vision Ltd, – Arbaaz Khan, Malaika Arora Khan & Dhillin Mehta
2011 (56th)	Band Baaja Baaraat	Yash Raj Films – Yash Chopra, Aditya Chopra
2011 (56th)	My Name Is Khan	Dharma Productions, Red Chillies Entertainment – Hiroo Yash Johar, Gauri Khan
2011 (56th)	Peepli Live	Aamir Khan Productions – Aamir Khan
2011 (56th)	Udaan	UTV Motion Pictures, Anurag Kashyap Films – Ronnie Screwvala, Anurag Kashyap, Sanjay Singh
2012 (57th)
2012 (57th)	Zindagi Na Milegi Dobara	Excel Entertainment – Farhan Akhtar, Ritesh Sidhwani
2012 (57th)	Delhi Belly	Aamir Khan Productions, UTV Motion Pictures – Aamir Khan, Kiran Rao, Ronnie Screwvala
2012 (57th)	Don 2	Excel Entertainment, – Farhan Akhtar, Ritesh Sidhwani, Shahrukh Khan
2012 (57th)	No One Killed Jessica	UTV Spotboy – Ronnie Screwvala
2012 (57th)	Rockstar	Shree Ashtavinayak Cine Vision Ltd, Eros International – Dhilin Mehta
2012 (57th)	The Dirty Picture	ALT Entertainment & Balaji Motion Pictures – Ekta Kapoor, Shobha Kapoor
2013 (58th)
2013 (58th)	Barfi!	UTV Motion Pictures – Ronnie Screwvala and Siddharth Roy Kapur
2013 (58th)	English Vinglish	Eros Entertainment – Sunil Lulla, R. Balki, and Rakesh Jhunjhunwala
2013 (58th)	Gangs of Wasseypur	Viacom 18 Motion Pictures – Anurag Kashyap and Sunil Bohra
2013 (58th)	Kahaani	Viacom 18 Motion Pictures and Pen India Limited – Sujoy Ghosh and Kushal Kantilal Gada
2013 (58th)	Vicky Donor	Eros Entertainment and John Abraham Entertainment – John Abraham
2014 (59th)
2014 (59th)	Bhaag Milkha Bhaag	Rakeysh Omprakash Mehra, Rajiv Tandon and P. S. Barathi
2014 (59th)	Chennai Express	UTV Motion Pictures and Red Chillies Entertainment – Ronnie Screwvala, Siddharth Roy Kapur and Gauri Khan
2014 (59th)	Goliyon Ki Raasleela Ram-Leela	SLB Films and Eros International – Sanjay Leela Bhansali, Kishore Lulla
2014 (59th)	Raanjhanaa	Eros International – Krishika Lulla
2014 (59th)	Yeh Jawaani Hai Deewani	Dharma Productions – Karan Johar
2015 (60th)
2015 (60th)	Queen	Viacom 18 Motion Pictures and Phantom Films – Anurag Kashyap and Vikramaditya Motwane
2015 (60th)	2 States	Dharma Productions and Nadiadwala Grandson Entertainment – Karan Johar and Sajid Nadiadwala
2015 (60th)	Haider	UTV Motion Pictures and Vishal Bhardwaj Pictures – Vishal Bhardwaj and Siddharth Roy Kapur
2015 (60th)	Mary Kom	SLB Films and Viacom 18 Motion Pictures – Sanjay Leela Bhansali
2015 (60th)	PK	Rajkumar Hirani Films and Vinod Chopra Films – Rajkumar Hirani and Vidhu Vinod Chopra
2016 (61st)
2016 (61st)	Bajirao Mastani	SLB Films and Eros International – Sanjay Leela Bhansali, Kishore Lulla
2016 (61st)	Badlapur	Maddock Films and Eros International – Dinesh Vijan, Sunil Lulla
2016 (61st)	Bajrangi Bhaijaan	Salman Khan Films and Eros International – Salman Khan, Rockline Venkatesh
2016 (61st)	Piku	MSM Motion Pictures, Saraswati Entertainment Creations Limited and Yash Raj Films – N. P. Singh, Ronnie Lahiri, Sneha Rajani
2016 (61st)	Talvar	VB Pictures and Junglee Pictures – Vineet Jain, Vishal Bhardwaj
2016 (61st)	Tanu Weds Manu Returns	Colour Yellow Productions and Eros International – Krishika Lulla, Aanand L. Rai
2017 (62nd)
2017 (62nd)	Dangal	Walt Disney Pictures, Aamir Khan Productions and UTV Motion Pictures – Aamir Khan, Kiran Rao, Siddharth Roy Kapoor
2017 (62nd)	Kapoor & Sons	Dharma Productions and Fox Star Studios – Hiroo Yash Johar, Karan Johar, Apoorva Mehta
2017 (62nd)	Neerja	Bling Unplugged and Fox Star Studios – Atul Kasbekar, Shanti Sivaram Maini
2017 (62nd)	Pink	Rising Sun Films and Rashmi Sharma Telefilms – Rashmi Sharma, Ronnie Lahiri, Sheel Kumar, Shoojit Sircar
2017 (62nd)	Sultan	Yash Raj Films – Aditya Chopra
2017 (62nd)	Udta Punjab	Balaji Motion Pictures and Phantom Films – Shobha Kapoor, Ekta Kapoor, Anurag Kashyap, Vikramaditya Motwane, Aman Gill, Vikas Bahl, Sameer Nair, Madhu Mantena
2018 (63rd)
2018 (63rd)	Hindi Medium	T-Series and Maddock Films – Dinesh Vijan, Bhushan Kumar, Krishan Kumar
2018 (63rd)	Badrinath Ki Dulhania	Dharma Productions – Karan Johar, Hiroo Johar and Apoorva Mehta
2018 (63rd)	Bareilly Ki Barfi	BR Studios and Junglee Pictures – Renu Ravi Chopra and Vineet Jain
2018 (63rd)	Secret Superstar	Aamir Khan Productions – Aamir Khan and Kiran Rao
2018 (63rd)	Toilet: Ek Prem Katha	Viacom 18 Motion Pictures, KriArj Entertainment and Friday Filmworks – Aruna Bhatia, Shital Bhatia, Prernaa Arora, Arjun N. Kapoor and Hitesh Thakkar
2019 (64th)
2019 (64th)	Raazi	Dharma Productions and Junglee Pictures – Vineet Jain, Karan Johar, Hiroo Yash Johar, Apoorva Mehta
2019 (64th)	Andhadhun	Viacom 18 Motion Pictures and Matchbox Pictures – Sriram Raghavan
2019 (64th)	Badhaai Ho	Junglee Pictures and Chrome Pictures – Vineet Jain, Aleya Sen, Hemant Bhandari, Amit Ravindernath Sharma, Sushil Choudhary, and Priti Sahani
2019 (64th)	Padmaavat	SLB Films and Viacom 18 Motion Pictures – Sanjay Leela Bhansali, Sudhanshu Vats, and Ajit Andhare
2019 (64th)	Sanju	Rajkumar Hirani Films and Vinod Chopra Films – Rajkumar Hirani and Vidhu Vinod Chopra
2019 (64th)	Stree	Maddock Films, and D2R Films – Dinesh Vijan, Raj Nidimoru and Krishna D.K.

=== 2020s ===
Year	Film	Studio(s)
2020 (65th)
2020 (65th)	Gully Boy	Excel Entertainment and Tiger Baby Films – Farhan Akhtar, Zoya Akhtar and Ritesh Sidhwani
2020 (65th)	Chhichhore	Nadiadwala Grandson Entertainment – Sajid Nadiadwala
2020 (65th)	Mission Mangal	Cape of Good Films, Hope Productions, Fox Star Studios, Aruna Bhatia, Anil Naidu
2020 (65th)	Uri: The Surgical Strike	RSVP Movies – Ronnie Screwvala
2020 (65th)	War	Yash Raj Films – Aditya Chopra
2021 (66th)
2021 (66th)	Thappad	Benaras Media Works and T-Series – Bhushan Kumar, Krishan Kumar, and Anubhav Sinha
2021 (66th)	Gulabo Sitabo	Rising Sun Films and Kino Works – Ronnie Lahiri and Sheel Kumar
2021 (66th)	Gunjan Saxena: The Kargil Girl	Dharma Productions and Zee Studios – Karan Johar, Hiroo Yash Johar and Apoorva Mehta
2021 (66th)	Ludo	T-Series – Bhushan Kumar, Divya Khosla Kumar, Krishan Kumar and Anurag Basu
2021 (66th)	Tanhaji: The Unsung Warrior	Ajay Devgn FFilms and T-Series – Ajay Devgn, Bhushan Kumar and Krishan Kumar
2022 (67th)
2022 (67th)	Shershaah	Dharma Productions, Kaash Entertainment, Amazon Prime Video
2022 (67th)	Ramprasad Ki Tehrvi	Drishyam Films, Jio Studios
2022 (67th)	Rashmi Rocket	RSVP Movies, Mango People Media Network, ZEE5
2022 (67th)	Sardar Udham	Rising Sun Films, Kino Works, Amazon Prime Video
2023 (68th)
2023 (68th)	Gangubai Kathiawadi	Bhansali Productions, Pen Studios
2023 (68th)	Badhaai Do	Junglee Pictures, Zee Studios
2023 (68th)	Bhool Bhulaiyaa 2	T-Series Films, Cine1 Studios
2023 (68th)	Brahmāstra: Part One – Shiva	Dharma Productions, Star Studios, Prime Focus, Starlight Pictures
2023 (68th)	The Kashmir Files	Zee Studios, Abhishek Agarwal Arts
2023 (68th)	Uunchai	Rajshri Productions, Mahaveer Jain Films, Boundless Media
2024 (69th)
2024 (69th)	12th Fail	Vinod Chopra Films, Zee Studios
2024 (69th)	Animal	T-Series Films, Cine1 Studios, Bhadrakali Pictures
2024 (69th)	OMG 2	Cape of Good Films, Viacom18 Studios, Wakaoo Films
2024 (69th)	Pathaan	Yash Raj Films
2024 (69th)	Jawan	Red Chillies Entertainment
2024 (69th)	Rocky Aur Rani Kii Prem Kahaani	Dharma Productions, Viacom18 Studios
2025 (70th)
2025 (70th)	Laapataa Ladies	Jio Studios, Aamir Khan Productions, Kindling Pictures
2025 (70th)	Article 370	Jio Studios, B62 Studios
2025 (70th)	Bhool Bhulaiyaa 3	T-Series Films, Cine1 Studios
2025 (70th)	Kill	Dharma Productions, Sikhya Entertainment
2025 (70th)	Stree 2	Maddock Films, Jio Studios

== Total wins ==
Wins by Studio

Wins	Studio
4	Yash Raj Films; SLB Films; UTV Motion Pictures Bimal Roy Productions; Aamir Khan Productions
3	Dharma Productions
2	FilmKraft; T-Series; ROMP; Excel Entertainment; Vinod Chopra Films

== Special 50 Year Award ==
In 2005, Filmfare announced the best film of the last 50 years as Sholay, although the film did not win the Filmfare Award for Best Film in its year of release.

== See also ==
- Filmfare Critics Award for Best Movie
- Filmfare Awards
- Bollywood
- Cinema of India
