= Lalit Dalmia =

Indian fashion designer

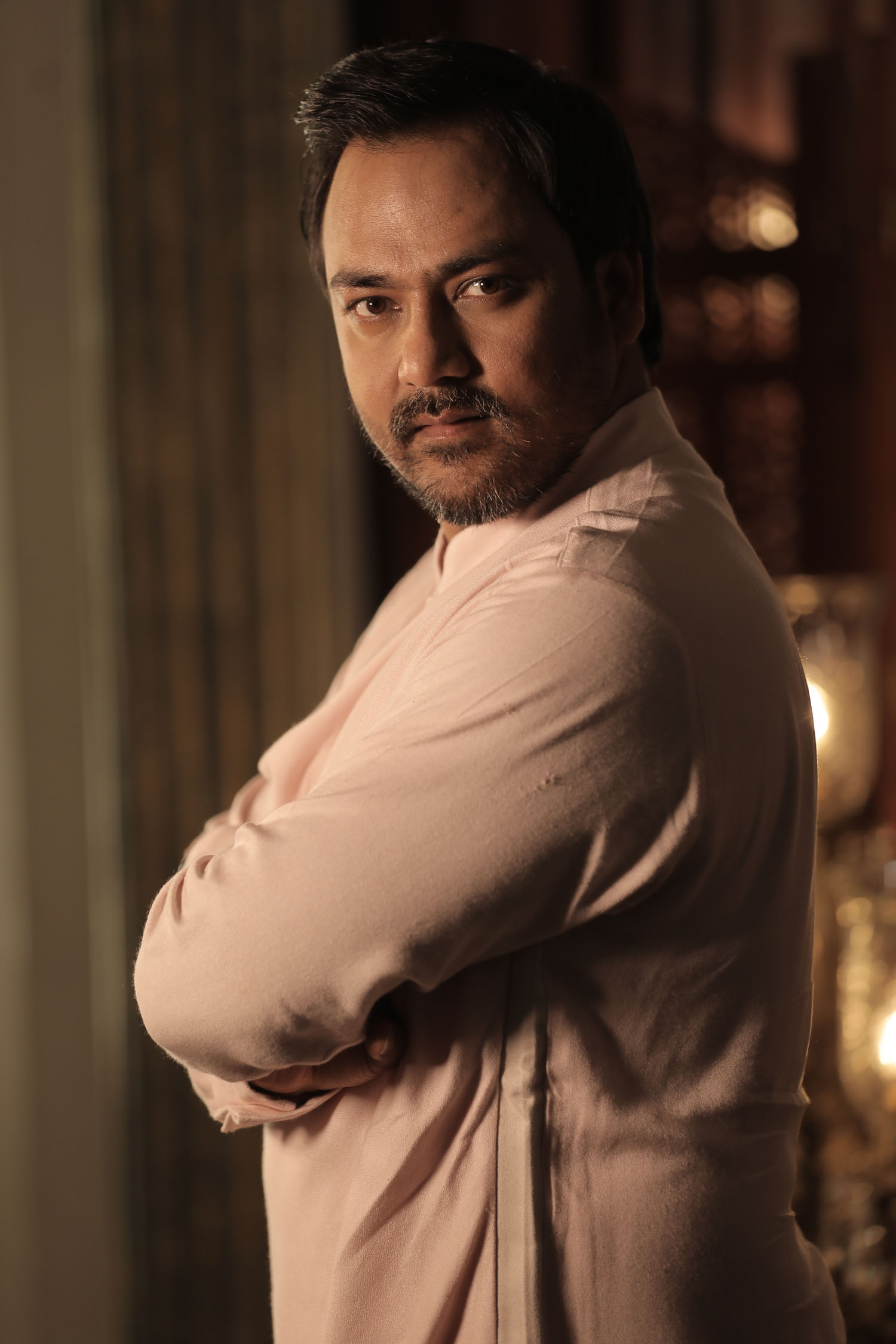
- Born: 14 August 1979 (age 46); Delhi, India
- Occupation: Fashion Designer
- Label: Lalit Dalmia
- Website: www.lalitdalmia.in

Lalit Dalmia (born 14 August 1979) is an Indian fashion designer from Delhi. He is known for his bridal and luxury wear.

== Clients and projects ==
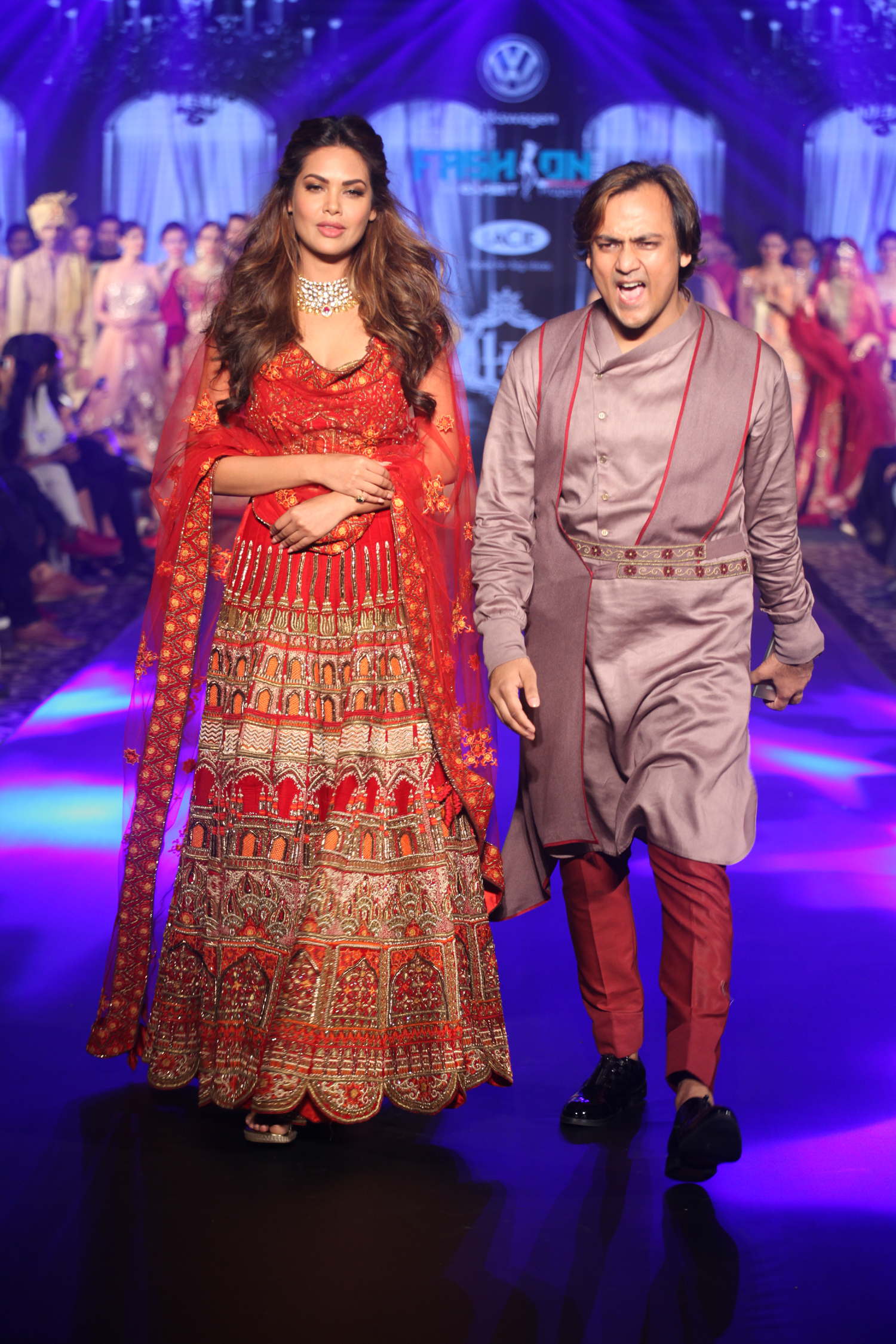
Esha Gupta walks in Lalit Dalmia Couture with Lalit Dalmia

Dalmia has dressed some of the leading Bollywood celebrities such as Esha Gupta, Gauahar Khan, Akshay Kumar, Isha Koppikar, Sunny Leone and Bollywood Film producer Aly Morani among several others. He has also dressed India's multiple Grand Slam champion Leander Paes, Tennis sensation Damir Džumhur, Russia's upcoming star Daniil Medvedev, US's Nicholas Monroe and Indian rookie Jeevan Nedunchezhiyan in Aircel Chennai Open fashion show. Apart from this, Dalmia has led many fashion shows as a leading designer and received an immense response for his innovative launch activities and collections

== Fashion Shows ==
Lakme Fashion Week 2016

== Store Locations ==
The brand has flagship stores in Pitam Pura and Chandni Chowk in New Delhi.
