= Dushmani: A Violent Love Story =

1995 Hindi film

Dushmani
- Theatrical release Poster
- Directed by: Bunty Soorma; Shekhar Kapur
- Written by: Karan Razdan
- Produced by: Karim Morani; Bunty Soorma; Aly Morani
- Starring: Sunny Deol; Jackie Shroff; Manisha Koirala; Deepti Naval; Anupam Kher; Raghuveer Yadav
- Cinematography: Manmohan Singh
- Edited by: Waman Bhonsle
- Music by: Songs: Anand–Milind; Score: Jolly; Kishore
- Production company: Cineyug
- Distributed by: B4U Films
- Release date: 19 January 1996
- Country: India
- Language: Hindi
- Budget: ₹5.75 crore
- Box office: ₹7.03 crore

Dushmani (lit. 'Enmity') is a 1996 Indian Hindi-language action romantic film directed by Bunty Soorma and Shekhar Kapur.

It stars Sunny Deol and Manisha Koirala in main roles, along with Jackie Shroff, Deepti Naval, Anupam Kher and Raghuveer Yadav.

Shekhar Kapur directed major portions of the film but left the film before completion due to differences with the producers. The rights of this film are now owned by Shah Rukh Khan's Red Chillies Entertainment.

== Plot ==
Bitter enmity has always existed between the Singh and the Oberoi families. With each and every generation swearing to extract vengeance. This generation consists of Suraj Singh and his elder brother, Jai. While Jai leads the life of a gangster, Suraj is not inclined to violence at all. He meets with a young woman named Sapna, and both fall in love with each other. When he takes Sapna to be introduced to Jai and the rest of his family, he is forbidden from marrying Sapna, as she is the sister of Oberoi.

Suraj and Sapna are able to convince Jai and the rest of the Singh family to give up this enmity, and let them marry. One day, Oberoi's men brutally attack Suraj's friend Raghu and critically injure him. Suraj goes tho Oberoi's garage and kills all of his goons. However, Raghu dies from his injuries. Furious, Suraj chases down one of the goons and kills him. Jai goes to meet Oberoi, and proposes marriage, and to his joy, Oberoi agrees, and both families start preparations for the marriage. Jai starts to relax and thinks about giving up his gangster-like life. It is then a group of men target him with automatic weapons, leaving him mortally wounded and hospitalized. When Suraj finds out, he is action, and decides to avenge his brother's injuries.

He finds out that the assailants are none other than Oberoi's men, and he swears to bring an end to Oberoi and his criminal empire. Suraj fights Oberoi's men along with Jai and he wounds Oberoi. Before dying, Oberoi tells Jai that he was wrong about love and that he wants to seek forgiveness. However, he had tricked him and stabs Jai with a knife. Suraj then kills Oberoi. Jai tells Suraj that Oberoi had never changed at all before dying. The film ends with Suraj and Sapna united, and Suraj scattering Jai's ashes in the lake.

== Cast ==
- Sunny Deol as Suraj Singh – Jai’s younger brother, Sapna’s boyfriend
- Jackie Shroff as Jai Singh – Suraj’s elder brother
- Manisha Koirala as Sapna Oberoi – Oberoi’s younger sister, Suraj’s girlfriend
- Anupam Kher as Oberoi
- Deepti Naval as Rama Oberoi – Oberoi’s wife
- Raghuveer Yadav as Raghu – Suraj’s friend
- Pradeep Rawat
- Manohar Singh as Sardar Sahib
- Dina Pathak as Buaji
- Varsha Usgaonkar as dancer in the song - 'Mera Salaam Le'
- Max Pokrovsky as dancer in the song - 'Aaj Pyar Kar Le Yaar'

== Music and soundtrack ==
The music for the songs was composed by Anand–Milind and the lyrics of the songs were penned by Sameer. The background score of the film was provided by Jolly and Kishore.

Dushmani-A violent story

Studio album by Anand-Milind
- Released: 1995
- Recorded: Meboob Studio, 1995
- Genre: Feature film soundtrack
- Length: 47 Min
- Label: Saregama India Limited

Professional ratings
Review scores
Source	Rating
Planet Bollywood	7.5/10 stars

#	Song	Singer
1	"Ladki Kunwari Thi Ladka Kunwara"	Kumar Sanu, Alka Yagnik
2	"Kabhi Hanste Hai Kabhi Rote Hai"	S. P. Balasubrahmanyam, Kavita Krishnamurti
3	"Tere Bina Jiya Kahin Lage Na"	Udit Narayan, Sadhana Sargam
4	"Aaj Pyar Kar Le Yaar"	Amit Kumar
5	"Mera Salaam Le"	Kumar Sanu, Udit Narayan, Kavita Krishnamurti
6	"Badi Mushkil Se Main Aai Hoon"	Kavita Krishnamurthy, Anand Shrivastava
7	"Banno Teri Ankhiyan Soorme"	Sapna Awasthi
