= Hum Hain Rahi Pyar Ke =

- Theatrical release poster
- Directed by: Mahesh Bhatt
- Screenplay by: Robin Bhatt (also Dialogues); Aamir Khan
- Story by: Robin Bhatt
- Produced by: Tahir Hussain
- Starring: Aamir Khan; Juhi Chawla; Sharokh Bharucha; Kunal Khemu; Baby Ashrafa
- Cinematography: Pravin Bhatt
- Edited by: Sanjay Sankla
- Music by: Songs: Nadeem–Shravan; Background Score: Shyam–Surender; Nadeem–Shravan
- Production company: Tahir Hussain Enterprises
- Distributed by: T. V. Films Pvt Ltd
- Release date: 23 July 1993
- Running time: 150 minutes
- Country: India
- Language: Hindi
- Box office: ₹97 million

Hum Hain Rahi Pyar Ke (transl. We Are Travelers on the Path of Love) is a 1993 Indian romantic comedy-drama film, directed by Mahesh Bhatt and produced by Tahir Hussain, with screenplay written by Aamir Khan and Robin Bhatt, and with a musical score by Nadeem–Shravan. Based on the 1958 Hollywood movie Houseboat, it stars Aamir Khan and Juhi Chawla in the lead roles, with Sharokh Bharucha and Kunal Khemu in supporting roles. Upon release, the film received positive reviews from critics, with particular praise directed towards Chawla's performance, for which she won the Filmfare Award for Best Actress at the 39th Filmfare Awards. The film has also garnered the National Film Award – Special Jury Award / Special Mention (Feature Film), and the Filmfare Award for Best Film. The film was remade in Telugu as Bhale Maavayya (1994) starring Suman and in Malayalam as Priyam (2000) starring Kunchacko Boban.

== Plot ==
The movie starts with, Rahul Malhotra is the caretaker of a garment company with a pending order of a hundred thousand shirts to Sindhi Businessman Mr Bijlani. Rahul is also the guardian of his deceased sister's mischievous kids: Sunny, Munni, and Vicky. He finds it hard to control the kids, as he is new to this. When the kids cause trouble, Rahul punishes them by locking them up in their room. However, the children escape and head for a carnival in town.

Vyjayanti Iyer is the bubbly daughter of Mr Iyer, a South Indian businessman and Carnatic music lover. Her father wants her to marry Natarajan Iyer, a Carnatic music legend, who is somewhat creepy. Vyjayanti refuses to marry him; as punishment, she is locked up and escapes. She meets the three kids at the carnival and they become friends. Vyjayanti explains that she has no home so the children invite her to stay with them.

The children go to great lengths to hide Vyjayanti from Rahul. In a row of hilarious sequences, they are always one step ahead of Rahul before he can discover Vyjayanti. Two nights later, however, Vyjayanti is revealed. Initially angry, Rahul sees that the children love her so he gives her a job as the children's governess. Vyjayanti begins to live with Rahul and the kids and slowly falls in love with him.

And then there enters seductive, glitzy Maya, Bijlani's daughter, who is obsessed with Rahul. She wants to marry Rahul, and Rahul approves, deciding it would benefit the children. When Vyjayanti and the children find out about Maya and Rahul's upcoming engagement ceremony, Vyjayanti is heartbroken and the kids are upset, as they dislike Maya. On the day of the engagement, Vyjayanti explains to the kids that she loves Rahul and wants to marry him. The kids come up with a plan to stop the engagement. They crash the party with a dramatic act, which successfully postpones the engagement but leads to Rahul losing his temper. Back home, he scolds Vyjayanti and she admits that she loves him, shocking him.

The next morning, Bijlani comes with Maya to offer Rahul a second chance. Rahul defends Vyjayanti against their insults, thereby expressing his own feelings for her. The mischievous kids chase Bijlani and Maya out of the house with rotten eggs and tomatoes. As revenge, Bijlani and Maya set on auctioning Rahul's house. Rahul asks his workers to work overtime to complete the shirt orders, which the supportive workers agree to do. A successful two lakh shirts are made and loaded onto a truck to be delivered to Bijlani. Bijlani hires some thugs to ensure that the truck doesn't arrive on time. Much to their distaste, Rahul arrives on time with the order, and Bijlani and Maya are arrested.

Vyjayanti is finally reunited with her father, who disapproves of her marrying anyone outside the Iyer clan. All the factory workers, Rahul's colleagues, and the children ask him to allow Rahul and Vyjayanti to marry. He continues to stand by his decision until Natarajan himself supports the couple, eventually leading Iyer to accept Rahul and Vyjayanti's marriage on the condition that they would marry in a South Indian ceremony. The movie ends with Rahul's marriage to Vyjayanti.

== Cast ==
- Aamir Khan as Rahul Malhotra
- Juhi Chawla as Vyjayanthi Iyer
- Dalip Tahil as Bijlani, Maya's father.
- Navneet Nishan as Maya Bijlani
- K.D. Chandran as Mr. Iyer, Vyjayanti's father.
- Veeru Krishnan as Natrajan Iyer
- Tiku Talsania as Advocate Homi Wadia
- Mushtaq Khan as Bhagwati Prasad Mishra "Mishraji"
- Javed Khan as Chhotya
- Robin Bhatt as Host and Manager of East West Airlines.
- Master Kunal Khemu as Sunny Chopra
- Baby Ashrafa as Munni Chopra
- Sharokh Bharucha as Vicky Chopra

== Soundtrack ==
Hum Hain Rahi Pyar Ke

Soundtrack album by Nadeem-Shravan
- Released: 1993
- Recorded: 1992
- Venue: Mumbai
- Studio: Sunny Super Sound
- Genre: Feature film soundtrack
- Length: 31:56
- Language: Hindi
- Label: Weston Musicassettes later purchased by Tips Music
- Producer: Tahir Hussain

Nadeem-Shravan chronology
| Rang (1993) | Hum Hain Rahi Pyar Ke (1993) | Dhartiputra (1993) |

The soundtrack of the movie was composed by the music duo Nadeem–Shravan and lyrics were contributed by Sameer. Vocals for Aamir Khan were supplied by Kumar Sanu, and for Juhi Chawla by Alka Yagnik and Sadhana Sargam.

Songs like "Ghunghat Ki Aad Se", "Kaash Koi Ladka Mujhe Pyaar Karta", "Woh Meri Neend Mera Chain Mujhe" and "Bombai Se Gayi Poona" became extremely popular. The song "Yunhi Kat Jaayega Safar Saath" is based on Schönes Mädchen aus Arcadia. According to the Indian trade website Box Office India, with around 2,500,000 units sold the soundtrack became the fifth highest-selling album of the year. "Bombay Se Gayi" tune and music is lifted from “Jhilmil Kare Aankhein” by Mohammed Ali Sheiki.

| # | Title | Singer(s) | Length |
|---|---|---|---|
| 1. | "Ghoonghat Ki Aadh Se" | Kumar Sanu & Alka Yagnik | 06:17 |
| 2. | "Yunhi Kat Jayega" | Kumar Sanu & Alka Yagnik | 07:40 |
| 3. | "Mujhse Mohabbat Ka" | Kumar Sanu & Alka Yagnik | 05:07 |
| 4. | "Woh Meri Neend Mera Chain" | Sadhana Sargam | 04:48 |
| 5. | "Chikni Soorat Tu Kahan Tha" | Kumar Sanu | 04:24 |
| 6. | "Bambai Se Gayi Poona" | Alka Yagnik | 04:23 |

== Awards and nominations ==
41st National Film Awards:

Won

- Special Jury Award – Mahesh Bhatt
- Best Female Playback Singer – Alka Yagnik for "Ghunghat Ki Aad Se"

39th Filmfare Awards:

Won

- Best Film – Tahir Hussain
- Best Actress – Juhi Chawla
- Best Lyricist – Sameer for "Ghunghat Ki Aad Se"

Nominated

- Best Director – Mahesh Bhatt
- Best Actor – Aamir Khan
- Best Music Director – Nadeem-Shravan
- Best Female Playback Singer – Alka Yagnik for "Hum Hain Rahi Pyar Ke"
