= Bhaag Johnny =

2015 Bollywood thriller film

- Theatrical release poster
- Directed by: Shivam Nair
- Screenplay by: Vikram Bhatt
- Produced by: Bhushan Kumar; Krishan Kumar; Vikram Bhatt; Ajay Kapoor
- Starring: Kunal Khemu; Zoa Morani; Mandana Karimi
- Cinematography: Prakash Kutty
- Edited by: Mukesh Thakur
- Music by: Devi Sri Prasad; Mithoon; Yo Yo Honey Singh; Arko
- Production companies: T-Series Films; BVG Films
- Distributed by: AA Films
- Release date: 25 September 2015
- Running time: 119 minutes
- Country: India
- Language: Hindi

Bhaag Johnny (transl. Run, Johnny) is a 2015 Bollywood thriller film directed by Shivam Nair, and produced by Bhushan Kumar, Krishan Kumar, Vikram Bhatt, and Ajay Kapoor. The film stars Kunal Khemu, Mandana Karimi and Zoa Morani in leading roles. It was released on 25 September 2015.

== Plot ==
Bangkok-based Janardhan "Johnny" Arora is called in by his conniving boss Ramona Bakshi where she accuses him of cheating and gives him a chance to redeem himself by going to Pattaya on a vacation. Whilst there, he learns from Ramona's right-hand man Mr. Nobody that she sent him to murder a girl named Tanya Malik who appears to pose some threat to Ramona. Although intent on saving his job, the moment he sets his sight on the beautiful Tanya, he is drawn into a state of confusion as to whether he should save the innocent girl's life or his job. However, a genie Jinn appears to help him and gives him an offer to live 2 different lives of his own at once, where one life will be completely isolated from another, Johnny won't remember that he even met the Jinn. As he accepts this offer, Johnny finds himself at the head of a conspiracy and several events unfolding fast.

== Cast ==
- Kunal Khemu as Janardhan Arora /Johnny
- Zoa Morani as Tanya Malik
- Mandana Karimi as Rachel Robinson
- Manasi Scott as Ramona Bakshi
- Vikram Bhatt as Jinn
- Nishigandha Wad as Savitri Arora
- Arun Bali as Acharya Ji
- Mukul Dev as ACP Pathan
- Urvashi Rautela as Johnny's girlfriend
- Major Bikramjeet Singh as Third Eye Detective
- Mohan Kapoor as Tanya's boss
- Aseem Merchant as Mr. Nobody
- Gyan Prakash as Tanya's father
- Deana Uppal in a special appearance in the song "Aankhon Aankhon"
- DSP as himself in the beginning of the song '"Daddy Mummy"

== Soundtrack ==
Bhaag Johnny

Soundtrack album by Devi Sri Prasad (DSP), Mithoon, Yo Yo Honey Singh, Arko
- Released: 20 August 2015
- Genre: Feature film soundtrack
- Length: 22:47
- Language: Hindi
- Label: T-Series

Singles from Bhaag Johnny
- 1. "Daddy Mummy" Released: 20 August 2015

The songs are composed by Mithoon, Yo Yo Honey Singh, Arko and Devi Sri Prasad (DSP). Ankit Tiwari, Yo Yo Honey Singh, Rahul Vaidya and Sunil Kamath sang for the film. The song "Daddy Mummy" is a Hindi remake of the song "Akalesthey Annam Pedatha" from the Telugu film Shankar Dada Zindabad (2007). (Note: The lyrics "Daddy Mummy" are based on the song of the same name from Villu (2009), which was also based on the same Telugu song.)

| No. | Title | Lyrics | Music | Singer(s) | Length |
|---|---|---|---|---|---|
| 1. | "Daddy Mummy" | Kumaar | Devi Sri Prasad (DSP) | Devi Sri Prasad (DSP), M. M. Manasi | 04:25 |
| 2. | "Iss Qadar Pyar Hai" | Faaiz Anwar | Arko | Ankit Tiwari | 03:50 |
| 3. | "Aankhon Aankhon" | Yo Yo Honey Singh | Yo Yo Honey Singh | Yo Yo Honey Singh | 04:04 |
| 4. | "Kinna Sona" | Amitabh Verma | Mithoon | Sunil Kamath | 05:03 |
| 5. | "Meri Zindagi" | Amitabh Verma | Mithoon | Rahul Vaidya | 05:25 |
| Total length: | | | | | 22:47 |

== Production ==
=== Casting ===
Earlier, Deepak Tijori was first to direct the film with Indian television actor Karan Singh Grover. Later on, Vikram Band Tijori will not be a part of project instead of this, Kunal Khemu will play leading role.

== Critical reception ==
Subhash K. Jha rated the film one and half stars out of five, saying, "Not that Bhaag Johnny was ever meant to be a dud. It must have sounded promising on paper, a crime thriller with a twist to the telling."
