= Vardi (film) =

- Theatrical release poster
- Directed by: Umesh Mehra
- Screenplay by: Umesh Mehra; Anand Kaushal; P. D. Mehra
- Dialogues by: Javed Siddiqui
- Story by: Shabd Kumar
- Produced by: Karim Morani; Bunty Soorma; Aly Morani
- Starring: Sunny Deol; Jackie Shroff; Kimi Katkar; Dharmendra (special appearance); Madhuri Dixit (special appearance); Vinod Mehra; Kader Khan
- Cinematography: S. Pappu
- Edited by: M. S. Shinde
- Music by: Anu Malik
- Production company: Cineyug
- Distributed by: Cineyug
- Release date: 6 January 1989
- Country: India
- Language: Hindi

Vardi (trans: Uniform) is a 1989 Indian Hindi-language action crime film directed by Umesh Mehra. It stars Sunny Deol, Jackie Shroff and Kimi Katkar, along with Dharmendra and Madhuri Dixit in special appearances.

The film was successful at the box office, becoming one of the highest-grossing movies of 1989.

== Plot ==
"Vardi", meaning "Uniform", is a story about duty and revenge, centred on a young police officer, Ajay Singh, and his relentless pursuit of a notorious criminal.

The narrative begins with Inspector Verma and his loyal friend and accomplice, Havildar Bhagwan Singh, successfully apprehending the dangerous criminal Lalchand. However, Lalchand vows revenge. He retaliates by kidnapping Verma's young son, Anil, and later informs the Inspector that he has killed the boy, devastating Verma and his wife, Shanti. During a subsequent attempt to capture the fleeing Lalchand, Havildar Bhagwan Singh is killed.

Tragically bereaved and deeply affected by the loss of his son and his best friend, Inspector Verma and Shanti take in Bhagwan Singh’s only son, a boy named Ajay. They raise him as their own, offering him the love and stability of a family.

Years pass, and Ajay grows up, embodying the honesty and bravery instilled in him by his adoptive parents and his late father. Following in the footsteps of the men he admires, Ajay becomes a dedicated Police Inspector. By this time, Verma has ascended to the rank of Commissioner of Police. Meanwhile, Ajay meets a young doctor, Sonu Kaul, and the two fall in love.

The main focus of Inspector Ajay Singh's professional life is the continued search for Lalchand. The criminal has not been idle; he has risen to become a powerful and ruthless kingpin of the underworld, posing a significant threat to society and the nation. Ajay is determined to bring Lalchand to justice, driven by a strong sense of duty and the memory of his own father’s sacrifice. He is a man of action, using his position and moral compass to fight crime.

The central conflict intensifies when Ajay discovers a shocking truth: Commissioner Verma's son, Anil, is actually alive. However, this is not a joyous revelation. Anil, who now goes by the name Jai, has been raised in the shadows of crime and operates as an associate in the underworld, perhaps even unknowingly working for Lalchand.

Ajay's mission now becomes two-fold and intensely personal. He must, first and foremost, succeed in his professional duty to capture the crime lord Lalchand and dismantle his empire. Simultaneously, he is faced with the difficult emotional task of trying to redeem Anil/Jai and reunite him with his long-suffering parents, Commissioner Verma and Shanti. The rest of the film chronicles Ajay's relentless and dangerous struggle to fulfill both promises—to uphold the law represented by his uniform (Vardi) and to restore a broken family. Ajay's commitment to family and justice is tested as he must confront the complex reality of his 'brother' on the wrong side of the law while pursuing the man responsible for his own family's tragedy.

== Cast ==
- Sunny Deol as Inspector Ajay Singh
- Jackie Shroff as Anil Verma / Jai
- Kimi Katkar as Dr. Sonu Kaul – Ajay’s girlfriend
- Dharmendra (special appearance) as Havildar Bhagwan Singh – Ajay’s biological father
- Madhuri Dixit (special appearance) as Jaya – Anil’s girlfriend
- Vinod Mehra as Police Commissioner Verma – Anil’s father, Ajay’s adoptive father
- Kader Khan in a dual role of identical twins as
  - Lalchand
  - Balkishan
- Paresh Rawal as Rudra
- Raza Murad as Kalan Khan
- Shafi Inamdar as Shambhu
- Anjana Mumtaz as Shanti Verma – Ravi’s mother, Ajay’s adoptive mother
- Satish Kaushik
- Tom Alter as Tom
- Bob Christo as Bob
- Sudhir Dalvi as Inspector General of Police
- Leena Das as Courtesan – In the song "Maine Kitne Dil Liye"
- Sameer Khakhar as Havildar
- Shammi as Customer
- Viju Khote as Kasturi
- Shubha Khote as Mrs. Kaul
- Roopesh Kumar
- Deep Dhillon as Rudra's Brother

== Music and soundtrack ==
This film's music was composed by Anu Malik and featured the first major Bollywood song of the singer Kumar Sanu, while lyrics of the songs were penned by Anand Bakshi.

Song	Singer
"Teri Hifazat, Meri Hifazat" - 1	Kumar Sanu
"Teri Hifazat, Meri Hifazat" - 2	Kumar Sanu
"Main Aansoo Aaj Bahaoongi"	Sadhana Sargam
"Wah Wah, Kya Kamar Hai"	Amit Kumar
"Oye, Rab Ne Tujhe Husn Diya Mere Liye, Mere Liye"	Shabbir Kumar, Asha Bhosle
"Maine Kitne Dil Liye"	Asha Bhosle
