= Ravi Pujari =

Indian gangster

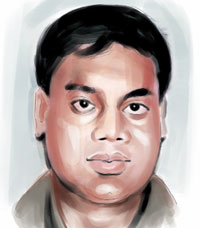
- Sketch of Ravi Pujari
- Born: Ravi Suliya Pujari
- Occupation: Gangster
- Known for: Extortion and organised crime
- Criminal status: In custody

Ravi Pujari is an Indian gangster who is involved in various murders and threats to Indian celebrities and businessmen. In January 2019, he was arrested in Dakar, Senegal. He is also noted for his philanthropy work in Western Africa.

== Career ==
Ravi Pujari started his criminal career in 1980s and by 21st century he formed his own gang. As per the Sydney Morning Herald, Pujari was believed to be hiding in Australia then and had an Australian passport. He often called up the police claiming to have targeted people close to Dawood or his aide Chhota Shakeel. On 13 February 2016 over the controversy of Jawaharlal Nehru University (JNU) protests, Ravi Pujari threatened to eliminate islamist hardliner Hurriyat faction Syed Ali Shah Geelani.

In 2017 and 2018, various activists in India including students and MLAs filed police complaints that they were receiving death threats from Ravi Pujari, now in Australia.

In 2019 Kerala MLA P. C. George complained that he got threats from Ravi Pujari as death threats for his kids. Kerala Police verified that Mr George got calls from Senegal.

From 2009 to 2013, Pujari threatened many Bollywood actors like Salman Khan, Akshay Kumar, Karan Johar, Rakesh Roshan, and Shahrukh Khan. Ravi Pujari threatened Shah Rukh Khan for his relationship with Karim Morani who is a friend and business partner of Shah Rukh Khan.

While he was in Senegal, he ran a restaurant chain called ‘Namaste India’ with nine outlets in western Africa. He provided drinking water facilities in various rural areas which were affected by water scarcity and made donations in the region. His philanthropy related work was also noted by the regional newspapers of the region.

== Arrest ==
On 21 January 2019, Pujari was arrested from a barber shop in Dakar, Senegal where he was living with his family under the name Anthony Fernandes. Mumbai police were then preparing a request for his extradition. Pujari held a Burkina Faso passport. Previously, he was believed to be residing in Australia.

Pujari had escaped to South Africa while on local bail in Senegal, before being arrested in a joint South African-Senegalese operation in South Africa in February 2020. He was extradited to Senegal and then India in the same month. He was brought to the Karnataka police and was wanted for 10 serious offences in both Karnataka and Mumbai.
