= Dum (2003 Hindi film) =

2003 Indian film by Eeshwar Nivas

- Theatrical release poster
- Directed by: Eeshwar Nivas
- Written by: Mehran; Eeshwar Nivas
- Based on: Dhill by Dharani
- Produced by: Aly Morani; Karim Morani; Mazhar Nadiawala; Bunty Soorma
- Starring: Vivek Oberoi; Dia Mirza; Atul Kulkarni
- Cinematography: Surendra Rao
- Edited by: Bharat Singh
- Music by: Sandeep Chowta
- Production company: Cineyugg Entertainment
- Distributed by: Eros International
- Release date: 24 January 2003
- Running time: 171 minutes
- Country: India
- Language: Hindi
- Budget: ₹7.75 crore
- Box office: ₹9.07 crore

Dum (transl. Guts / Valour) is a 2003 Indian Hindi-language action film directed by Eeshwar Nivas and produced by Aly and Karim Morani. It is a remake of the 2001 Tamil film Dhill (2001). The film stars Vivek Oberoi, Diya Mirza, Govind Namdeo, and Atul Kulkarni, while Sushant Singh, Mukesh Rishi, and Yashpal Sharma play supporting roles. The film's music was composed by Sandeep Chowta.

The film was released theatrically on 24 January 2003.

== Plot ==
Uday and Mohan come from lower middle-class families. Against their families' wishes, the boys are determined to join the police force. The duo aim to succeed on the basis of their abilities. Despite a lack of any recommendations or leverage to make it to the police academy, they are accepted with the help of Raj Dutt Sharma, their training officer.

The duo also return his favour by realizing their dreams and making him proud. They soon become popular as no-nonsense upright cops. One day, however, Kaveri, who happens to be Uday's girlfriend, gets into an argument with Inspector Shankar aka Encounter Shankar after she witnesses him urinating in a river. Shankar tries to slap Kaveri, but Uday intervenes and beats Shankar up badly. Shankar swears vengeance on him and leaves. On learning this, Sharma tells Uday that Shankar is an egoistic, corrupt cop who uses his powers for wrong activities.

He reveals that on the orders of Minister Deshmukh, a goon named Babu Kasai killed his rival. Sharma's wife Lakshmi was one of the many witnesses to the murder, but only she came forward to testify. Shankar, who was also on Deshmukh's payroll, barged into Sharma's household and killed Sharma's daughter in front of Lakshmi. After sending Lakshmi into shock, Shankar was promoted over Sharma; the latter was demoted and given the job of selecting officers for training.

This was one of the reasons why Sharma selected the duo. Uday now decides that he will not stop until Shankar's menace ends once and for all. However, Shankar already goes into offensive mode by killing Mohan. After cornering Uday, Shankar thinks that he is safe. But Uday retaliates by attacking Shankar. He kills Babu with Shankar's gun stolen by him, making everybody believe that Shankar gunned the criminal. In retaliation, Shankar kills Deshmukh and frames Uday for it. Now, it is revealed that Babu's death was faked and that he is actually in captivity of Uday.

Unaware of this, Shankar manages to launch a massive manhunt against Uday. On learning that Babu is still alive, Shankar springs into action to track down Babu, Uday, and Kaveri. He traces the trio, and a shootout occurs. Babu gets fatally injured during the fracas. Taking advantage of the situation, Shankar tries to corner and kill Uday. Meanwhile, Babu, who is on his deathbed, confesses all his crimes to Kaveri, who videotapes it.

The commissioner himself turns up at the crime scene, where Kaveri shows the dying confession to him. With Shankar's real face exposed, the commissioner orders both Uday and Shankar to surrender. Shankar tries to run away, but Uday tracks him down and kills him, thus avenging all the wrongs Shankar caused. Uday surrenders, after which he is duly tried in court. Based on the evidence, he is exonerated, after which he is cheerfully greeted by people in the end.

== Cast ==
- Vivek Oberoi as Uday Shinde
- Dia Mirza as Kaveri Mathur
- Atul Kulkarni as Inspector "Encounter" Shankar
- Sushant Singh as Mohan Chaturvedi
- Govind Namdeo as Minister Deshmukh
- Mukesh Rishi as Raj Dutt Sharma
- Sheeba Akashdeep as Lakshmi Sharma, Raj's wife
- Yashpal Sharma as Babu Kasai
- Nagesh Bhosale as Jitendra Salvi aka Jeetu Bhai, Provident Fund officer
- Rakhi Sawant as Maid (cameo appearance)
- Yusuf Hussain as Police Commissioner
- Yana Gupta as the dancer in the item song "Babuji Zara Dheere Chalo"

== Soundtrack ==
The soundtrack was composed by Sandeep Chowta with the lyrics penned by Sameer, Abbas Tyrewala, and Nitin Raikwar.

Soundtrack
No.	Title	Lyrics	Artist(s)	Length
1.	"Dum"	Sameer, Abbas Tyrewala, Nitin Raikwar	Sandeep Chowta	4:58
2.	"Jeena"	Nitin Raikwar	Sonu Nigam, Sowmya Raoh	4:48
3.	"Babuji Zara Dheere Chalo"	Sameer	Sukhwinder Singh, Sonu Kakkar	4:59
4.	"Someday"	Nitin Raikwar	Leslie Lewis, Anuradha Sriram	4:54
5.	"Dil Hi Dil Mein"	Abbas Tyrewala	Sonu Nigam, Sowmya Raoh	4:33
6.	"Suntaja"	Sameer	Sukhwinder Singh, Jolly Mukherjee, Javed Ali, Sowmya Raoh, Parthiv Gohil & Sandeep Chowta	5:03
7.	"Dum"	Sameer, Abbas Tyrewala, Nitin Raikwar	Sonu Nigam	4:57
8.	"Babuji Zara – Bijli Mix"	Sameer	Sukhwinder Singh, Sonu Kakkar	5:49

== Release ==
The film was released on 24 January 2003. In the UK, the distributor removed the visuals of a gunshot impact to secure a 12A classification.

== Critical reception ==
Dum received mixed reviews from critics. Omar Ahmed of Empire Online gave the film 4 out of 5, writing, "Niwas' third directorial venture doesn't punch as hard as his critically-acclaimed debut, Shool. But with a sharp, power-packed narrative, he manages to strike plenty of universal chords that should help the film cross over to the mainstream."

Conversely, Taran Adarsh of IndiaFM, gave the film one and a half stars out of five, praising the first half while criticizing the second; he praised the cinematography and the action sequences aside from the performances of Oberoi and Kulkarni, but wrote off the screenplay and execution. Deepa Gumaste of Rediff.com also responded negatively, similarly praising Sushant Singh and some moments in the first half, but criticized the cinematography and placement of the songs. The reviewer felt the film's message involving vigilantism was misleading.

S. Dharani, who wrote and directed the original, criticised the film for straying from the source material and making changes that created significant story problems.
