= Main Aur Charles =

- Theatrical release poster
- Directed by: Prawaal Raman
- Written by: Prawaal Raman
- Screenplay by: Prawaal Raman
- Story by: Prawaal Raman
- Produced by: Raju Chadha; Amit Kapoor; Vikram Khakhar
- Starring: Randeep Hooda; Adil Hussain; Richa Chadda; Tisca Chopra; Alexx O'Nell
- Cinematography: Anuj Rakesh Dhawan
- Edited by: Nipun Ashok Gupta
- Production company: Wave Cinemas Cynozure Networkz
- Release date: 30 October 2015 (India)
- Running time: 121 minutes
- Country: India
- Language: Hindi
- Budget: ₹100 million
- Box office: ₹80 million

Main aur Charles (transl. Me and Charles) is a 2015 Hindi crime film written and directed by Prawaal Raman and produced by Cynozure Networkz. The film is a fictitious thriller inspired by true events; it is told from the perspective of the Indian cop, Amod Kanth, who handled the case of the Indian Origin French serial killer Charles Sobhraj who was known as the bikini killer. The film opened on 30 October 2015 to positive reviews across India. However, it was a box office flop, grossing ₹80 million (US$1.25 million) against a ₹100 million (US$1.56 million) budget.

The film stars Randeep Hooda, Richa Chadda, Adil Hussain, Tisca Chopra, and Alexx O'Nell in lead roles. Through the narrative, we see a series of crimes committed by Charles and the story of each of his victims, who fell for his charisma but were betrayed by his serpentine nature. The man not just escaped several high security jails but also manipulated the legal system. In the title, Main aur Charles, the word 'Main' means 'me' and stands for the character of Amod Kanth. The film was warmly accepted in the trade for its impeccable direction, casting and background score. Apart from these technicalities, the film has satisfied critics creatively with fine performances by Hooda, Chadha and Hussain.

== Cast ==
- Randeep Hooda - Hatchand Bhaonani Gurumukh Charles Sobhraj / Zubin Pratap
- Richa Chaddha - Mira Sharma (Charles's girl friend)
- Adil Hussain - Amod Kanth
- Alexx O'Nell - Richard Thomas
- Lucky Morani - Dr. Ashima Mehra (criminal psychologist)
- Mandana Karimi - Liz (Charles's girl friend)
- Shaanti - Princess Malvika
- Dijana Dejanovic - Charles's Lawyer
- Vipin Sharma - Satender Kumar (Jailor)
- Tisca Chopra - Reena (Amod Kanths' wife)
- Kanika Kapoor - Special appearance as bar singer
- Anastasia Fullfina - Andrea (Charles's girl friend)
- Nandu Madhav - Inspector Sudhakar Zhende
- Saurabh Sarkar- Bajrangi Babu
- Sandeep Punia - Satpal Punia
- Satyakam Gupta - Rajan Ahuja
- Shanu Dev - Mr.Joshi (Investigating Officer)
- Abhiskek Diwan - Hemant
- Judge - M.L CHAUHAN(IAS)

== Production ==
The film was shot in Delhi, Goa, Mumbai, Pattaya, and Udaipur.

== Soundtrack ==
Main Aur Charles

Soundtrack album by Vipin Patwa, Aditya Trivedi, Bally Grunge and Sanjeev-Darshan
- Released: October 15, 2015
- Length: 29:07
- Label: T-Series

The music for Main Aur Charles is composed by Vipin Patwa, Aditya Trivedi, Bally Grunge and Sanjeev–Darshan. The full audio album was released on 15 October 2015. The music rights are acquired by T-Series.

The song 'Jab Chaaye mera jaadoo' is originally from the movie Lootmaar (1980).

No.	Title	Lyrics	Singer(s)	Length
1.	"Neeli Bullet"	Kartik Chaudhry	Aditya Trivedi	03:41
2.	"Woh Tho Yahin Hai Lekin"	Dr. Sagar	Jonita Gandhi	02:51
3.	"Ya Rabba"	Rohan Moktali	Saugat Upadhaya	04:07
4.	"Dekhe Meri Aankhon Mein Jo"	Kartik Chaudhry	Saba Azad	03:36
5.	"Jee Lo Yaaron"	Bally Grunge	Saugat Upadhaya	03:43
6.	"Main To Yahin Hoon Lekin"	Dr Sager	Ali Azmat	02:39
7.	"Theme of Charles"	Aditya Trivedi	Aditya Trivedi	03:36
8.	"Jab Chaye Mera Jadoo"	Ikram Basra	Kanika Kapoor	04:54
Total length:				29:07

== Reception ==
Shubhra Gupta for The Indian Express rated 1 star out of 5 and wrote "The film should have been riveting. But it comes off as a slapdash, confused collage of scenes involving the famous jail break in which the real life Sobhraj broke free with several prisoners: it was the kind of astoundingly brazen 'kaand' whose reverberations were felt in the system for a long time." Sweta Kaushal for Hindustan Times wrote "The film does not just fail, it crashes miserably." Nandini Ramnath for Scroll.in wrote "The brazen fun that Charles and his cohorts are having is contrasted with the routine police work by Adil Hussain's overly loud and morally outraged cop. Hussain's outrage at Charles seems to be the result of envy." On review aggregator website Rotten Tomatoes, the film holds an approval rating of 33% based on 6 reviews, and an average rating of 5/10. Rachit Gupta for Filmfare wrote "Main Aur Charles is also a period film. But most of it takes place on beaches in Goa, courtrooms and jails. Locations that haven't really changed in the past 30 odd years. So the only place that you actually get to see a simulated sense of the ‘70s and ‘80s is the fashion."
