= Adhura =

Indian television series

- Written by: Ananya Banerjee; Anand Jain
- Directed by: Gauravv K. Chawla; Ananya Banerjee
- Starring: Rasika Duggal; Ishwak Singh; Shrenik Arora; Rahul Dev; Zoa Morani
- Composer: John Stewart Eduri
- Country of origin: India
- Original language: Hindi
- No. of seasons: 1
- No. of episodes: 7

Production
- Executive producer: Rahul Gandhi
- Producers: Monisha Advani; Nikkhil Advani; Madhu Bhojwani
- Cinematography: Srijan Chaurasia
- Editor: Maahir Zaveri
- Production company: Emmay Entertainment

Original release
- Network: Amazon Prime Video
- Release: 7 July 2023

Adhura (transl. Incomplete) is a 2023 Indian Hindi-language horror thriller television series on Amazon Prime Video. It stars Rasika Dugal, Ishwak Singh and Rahul Dev and is directed by Ananya Banerjee and Gauravv K. Chawla and produced by Monisha Advani, Nikkhil Advani and Madhu Bhojwani. The series premiered on the OTT platform Amazon Prime Video on July 7, 2023. The primary shooting for the series was done in The Lawrence School, Lovedale.

== Plot ==
Strange occurrences at the Nilgiri Valley School appear to be connected to Vedant, a new 10-year-old pupil. Adhiraj Jaisingh, a former student, must confront actions from fifteen years ago when the class of 2007 reunites. But when Vedant and Adhiraj cross paths, the situation takes a terrifying turn. The lives of everyone on campus are at risk as a sinister secret begins to surface.

=== Episode 1: "Psycho Puppy Killer" ===
The Dean of Nilgiri valley school dies under suspicious circumstances. While Vedant is being bullied by fellow students in the boarding school, they lock him up in a locker and he mysteriously comes out of it.There starts the series of mishaps in his surrounding. A puppy is killed and Vedant is found near with blood all over his clothes. Everyone starts to believe he is the killer while newly appointed dean asks counsellor, Supriya Ghosh to look after him as Vedant's parents disregard the fact that he is having hard time adjusting.

Adhiraj flies in from the US to attend the school reunion. There, he meets his former batchmates, including Malvika, his school-time love interest, who is now married to Dev. However, Ninad is missing, and Adhiraj appears to be hiding some secrets.

=== Episode 2: "Shadow Boy" ===
Ninad becomes friends with Adhiraj, also known as Aadhu, who saves him from bullies at school. Ninad creates a comic-book world for himself, calling himself the Shadow Boy and seeing Adhiraj as the Phoenix Boy, his savior. All the grown-ups carry their own insecurities, even after all these years.

During the function, when Adhiraj is called on stage, Vedant approaches him and says something that deeply disturbs him. Vedant then faints and is kept under observation.

=== Episode 3: "If You Make Trouble, You Will Be Punished" ===
On the last day of school, Malvika plans a surprise date for Adhiraj and gets stood up. That's when Dev takes advantage and eventually marries her. Ninad in the heat of moment tries to kiss Adhiraj and Adhiraj calls him names in rage.

In the present, Adhiraj goes to Kotagiri and learns from Ninad’s parents that he has been missing for 15 years. Ninad left a note saying his grandfather was unwell and confirming Coach Vyas as his guardian. The case was closed with no results, and the police insisted that Ninad left willingly and was not considered missing.

Back at school, Suyash commits suicide under unknown influence. While returning to his room, Adhiraj has an anxiety attack and sees Vedant approaching him, confirming that Vedant is fighting back.

=== Episode 4: "The Boy Who Lives Inside Vedant" ===
The police start the investigation and ask old students to stay back for one more day. Malvika starts to have second thoughts about her breaking up with Adhiraj. Rajat is attacked by an unknown entity and is almost choked to death and Vedant also goes through same suffocation as him. Both of them survive the incident.

In the flashback of Vedant, he is offered in help and possessed by Ninad.

=== Episode 5: "No Exit" ===
A new investigating officer, Officer Bedi, is assigned for the case who wants to find out truth by hook or crook. Rajat dies mysteriously similar to Suyash by jumping off of an old building.

It is revealed that on the last day of school, Dev had beaten Ninad up for making Malvika cry.

=== Episode 6: "Hush Little Baby" ===
While pulling out Rajat's body, police find another body in the dump. Adhiraj believes it is Ninad's. He tries to find out what must have happened. Adhiraj investigates in his own way and finds out that Suyash, Rajat and Dev assaulted Ninad on the last day and Coach Vyas and peon Devi Prasad were all involved in the case. Dev tries to flee from campus only to see mass murders in front of him pointing him to stay back.

Vedant again has seizures and Supriya takes him to the hospital. In the flashback, Supriya was suffering from post partum depression and accidentally kills her newborn. Her husband commits suicide.

=== Episode 7: "The Farewell" ===
Dev is killed in front of everyone, and the situation initially seems resolved. However, when Ninad’s belongings are retrieved, Adhiraj finds a badge and approaches Malvika. He asks her to confess, but she denies everything. It is then revealed that Malvika pushed Ninad to his death, as she had always been jealous of his closeness to Adhiraj and saw him as a third wheel in their relationship. Malvika is also killed, and Ninad’s soul finally departs for good.

Supriya tries to connect with her dead child's spirit and is possessed by someone else instead. She calls Adhiraj for help while he is leaving for the US.

== Cast ==
- Rasika Duggal as Supriya Ghosh
- Ishwak Singh as Adhiraj Jaisingh
- Shrenik Arora as Vedant Malik
- Rahul Dev as Officer Bedi
- Zoa Morani as Malvika Seth Jamwal
- Sahil Salathia as Suyash Verma
- Rijul Ray as Dev Pratap Jamwal
- Aru Krishansh Verma as Rajat
- Poojan Chhabra as teenage Ninad Raman
- Arjun Deswal as teenage Adhiraj Jaisingh
- Vansh Sethii as teenage Dev Jamwal
- Anisha Pahuja as teenage Malvika Seth
- Akshay Nagori as teenage Suyash Verma
- Chinmay Chandraunshuh as teenage Rajat
- K.C. Shankar as Dean K. C. Swamy
- Priya Banerjee as Nancy, Suyash's girlfriend
- Jaimini Pathak as Chandra Prakash Jha, school teacher
- Digvijay Savant as Dean Satyanshu Vyas
- Pawan Singh as Devi Prasad, a school peon
