= Ishwak Singh =

Indian actor (born 1989)

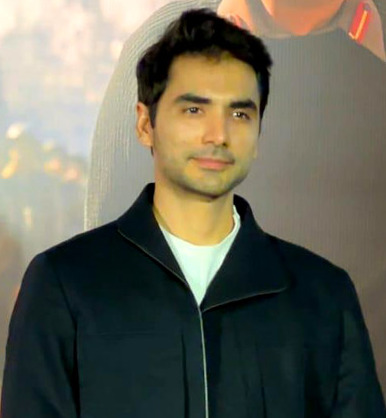
- Singh in 2023
- Born: 18 November 1989 (age 36); New Delhi, India
- Occupation: Actor
- Years active: 2013–present

Ishwak Singh (born 18 November 1989) is an Indian actor who works in Hindi-language television series and films. Following small roles in several films, he became known for starring in the series Paatal Lok (2020–2025) and Rocket Boys (2022–2023), receiving nominations for the Filmfare OTT Awards. He has also starred in the second season of Made in Heaven and in the spy thriller film Berlin, both in 2023.

== Early life ==
Singh was born in New Delhi, India. He studied to be an architect, and ventured into acting by joining Asmita Theatre, a theatre group in Delhi.

== Career ==
Singh made his screen debut with a small role in Raanjhanaa (2013). He expanded into films with brief roles in the 2015 films Aligarh and Tamasha and had a bigger role in the romantic drama Tum Bin II (2016). He then played a supporting role opposite Sonam Kapoor in the comedy Veere Di Wedding (2018). In 2019, he had a small role in Sanjay Leela Bhansali-produced film Malaal, starring Sharmin Segal and Meezaan Jafri.

In 2020, Singh starred as Imran Ansari, a young, idealistic cop in the Amazon Prime Video crime thriller series Paatal Lok. Reviewing the series for The Indian Express, Shubhra Gupta labelled him as "impressive". Priyanka Roy of The Telegraph considered him to be "the find of the series". He was nominated for a Filmfare OTT Awards, for Best Supporting Actor in a Drama Series. Singh next played a supporting role in one segment of the Amazon Prime Video anthology film Unpaused (2020).

In 2022 and 2023, he portrayed Vikram Sarabhai opposite Jim Sarbh's Homi J. Bhabha in the Sony LIV drama series Rocket Boys. Journalist Anuj Kumar of The Hindu opined, "As the genteel but determined Sarabhai, Ishwak Singh proves to be an effective foil to Sarbh. His honest smile wins half of the battle in essaying a complex role." He also starred in the horror series Adhura and the second season of the drama series Made in Heaven, both for Amazon Prime Video.

Also in 2023, Singh starred in the spy thriller film titled Berlin, alongside Aparshakti Khurana, and Tumse Na Ho Payega alongside Mahima Makwana. The former film premiered at the Indian Film Festival of Los Angeles in 2023 and was released on ZEE5 the following year. The critic Saibal Chatterjee labelled Singh's performance as a deaf-mute man accused of being a foreign spy as "at once expressive and mystifying". In 2025, Singh reprised his role as Ansari in the second season of Paatal Lok.

== In the media ==
Ishwak Singh ranked 18th in Times 50 Most Desirable Men List of 2020.

== Filmography ==
Key
†	Denotes projects that have not yet been released

=== Films ===
Key
†	Denotes films that have not yet been released

Year	Title	Role	Notes
2013	Raanjhanaa	Doctor	
2015	Aligarh	Arvind Narayan	
2015	Tamasha	Tara's friend	
2016	Mohavalayam		Malayalam film
2016	Tum Bin II	Harry	
2018	Veere Di Wedding	Nirmal Sharma	
2019	Malaal	Aditya	
2020	Unpaused	Chirag	Segment: "Apartment"
2023	Tumse Na Ho Payega	Gaurav Shukla	
2023	Berlin	Ashok	
2025	Tumko Meri Kasam	Rudra Tripathi	
2026	Gandhari	Gokul	
TBA	Sarvagunn Sampanna †	TBA	Post-production

=== Television ===
Year	Title	Role
2020–2025	Paatal Lok	Imran Ansari
2022–2023	Rocket Boys	Vikram Sarabhai
2023	Adhura	Adhiraj Jaisingh
2023	Made in Heaven	Raghav Sinha
2025	Mitti: Ek Nayi Pehchaan	Raghav Sharma

=== Music videos ===
Year	Title	Singer	Ref.
2025	"Palki Mein Hoke Sawaar - Take 2"	Asees Kaur, Shahid Mallya	
2025	"Dekha Ji Dekha Maine"	Jyoti Nooran	

== Awards and nominations ==
Year	Award	Category	Work	Result	Ref.
2020	Vogue Beauty Awards	Fresh Face- Male	—N/a	Won	
2020	Filmfare OTT Awards	Best Supporting Actor - Drama Series	Paatal Lok	Nominated	
2022	Filmfare OTT Awards	Best Actor (Male)	Rocket Boys	Nominated	
