= 39th Filmfare Awards =

1994 awards for Hindi cinema

- Date: February 12, 1994

Highlights
- Best Film: Hum Hain Rahi Pyaar Ke
- Critics Award for Best Film: Kabhi Haan Kabhi Naa
- Most awards: Baazigar and Damini (4)
- Most nominations: Khalnayak (11)

The 39th Filmfare Awards for Hindi cinema were held in 1994.

Khalnayak led the ceremony with 11 nominations, followed by Baazigar and Darr with 10 nominations each.

Baazigar and Damini were the most awarded films with 4 awards each, with the former winning Best Actor (for Shah Rukh Khan), and the latter winning Best Director (for Rajkumar Santoshi) and Best Supporting Actor (for Sunny Deol).

Shah Rukh Khan won his first Filmfare Award for Best Actor for his performance in Baazigar. He also won his first Best Actor (Critics) award for Kabhi Haan Kabhi Naa, and was nominated for Best Villain for his performance in Yash Chopra's Darr, rounding off a spectacular year for him.

Juhi Chawla received her first and only Filmfare Award for Best Actress for her performance in Hum Hain Rahi Pyar Ke.

== Main awards ==
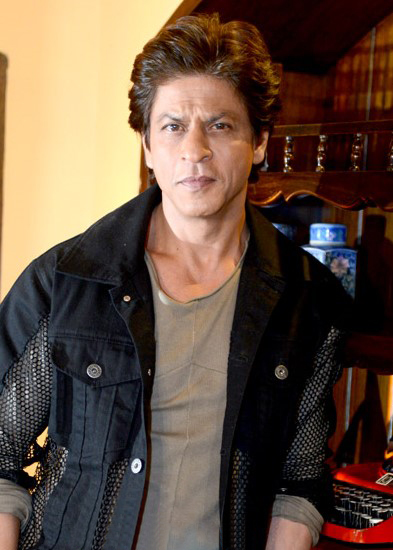
Shah Rukh Khan — Best Actor winner for Baazigar & Best Actor (Critics) winner for Kabhi Haan Kabhi NAa

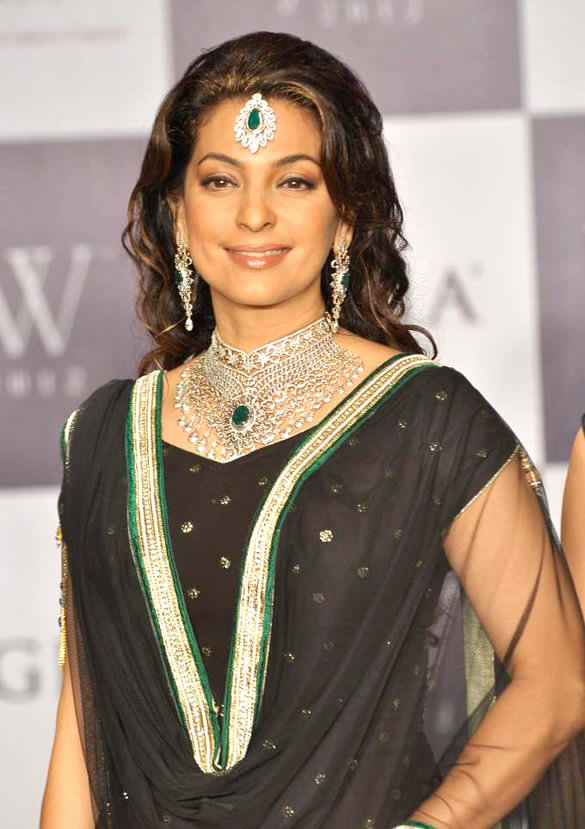
Juhi Chawla — Best Actress winner for Hum Hain Rahi Pyar Ke

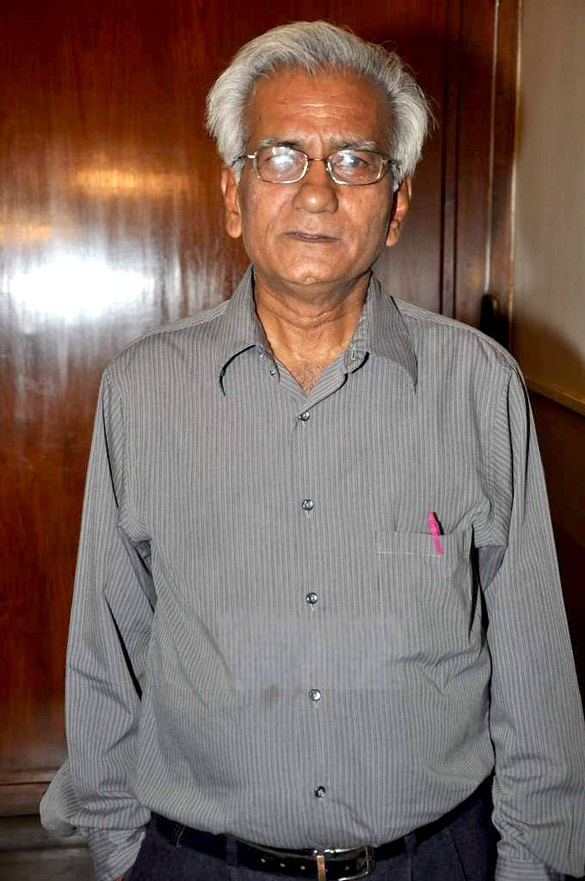
Kundan Shah — Best Director Critics winner for Kabhi Haan Kabhi Na

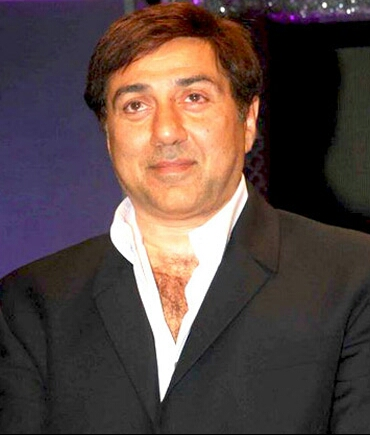
Sunny Deol — Best Supporting Actor winner for Damini

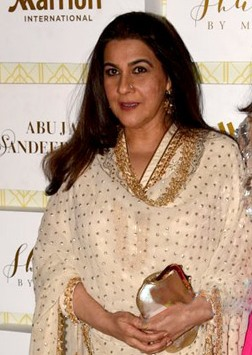
Amrita Singh — Best Supporting Actress winner for Aaina

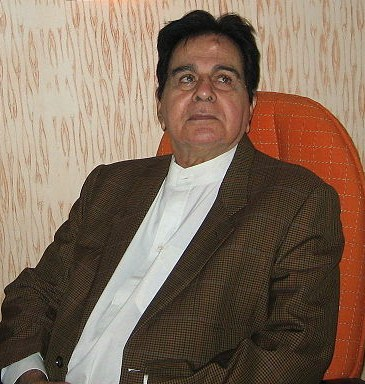
Dilip Kumar — Lifetime Achievement Awardee

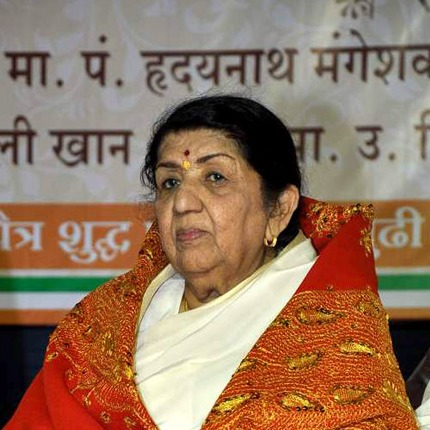
Lata Mangeshkar — Lifetime Achievement Awardee

=== Best Film ===
Hum Hain Rahi Pyaar Ke

- Aankhen
- Baazigar
- Damini
- Khalnayak

=== Best Director ===
Rajkumar Santoshi – Damini

- David Dhawan – Aankhen
- Mahesh Bhatt – Hum Hain Rahi Pyaar Ke
- Subhash Ghai – Khalnayak
- Yash Chopra – Darr

=== Best Actor ===
Shah Rukh Khan – Baazigar

- Aamir Khan – Hum Hain Rahi Pyar Ke
- Govinda – Aankhen
- Jackie Shroff – Gardish
- Sanjay Dutt – Khalnayak

=== Best Actress ===
Juhi Chawla – Hum Hain Rahi Pyar Ke

- Madhuri Dixit – Khalnayak
- Meenakshi Sheshadri – Damini
- Sridevi – Gumrah

=== Best Supporting Actor ===
Sunny Deol – Damini

- Amrish Puri – Gardish
- Jackie Shroff – Khalnayak
- Nana Patekar – Tirangaa
- Naseeruddin Shah – Sir

=== Best Supporting Actress ===
Amrita Singh – Aaina

- Anu Aggarwal – Khal–Naaikaa
- Dimple Kapadia – Gardish
- Raakhee – Anari
- Shilpa Shetty – Baazigar

=== Best Comedian ===
Anupam Kher – Darr

- Anupam Kher – Shreemaan Aashique
- Anupam Kher — Waqt Hamara Hai
- Johnny Lever – Baazigar
- Kader Khan – Aankhen

=== Best Villain ===
Paresh Rawal – Sir

- Amrish Puri – Damini
- Gulshan Grover – Sir
- Raj Babbar – Dalaal
- Shah Rukh Khan – Darr

=== Best Debut ===
Saif Ali Khan – Aashiq Awara

=== Lux New Face of the Year ===
Mamta Kulkarni – Aashiq Awara

=== Best Story ===
Damini – Sutanu Gupta

=== Best Screenplay ===
Baazigar – Akash Khurana, Robin Bhatt and Javed Siddiqui

=== Best Dialogue ===
Sir – Jay Dixit

=== Best Music Director ===
Baazigar – Anu Malik

- Darr – Shiv–Hari
- Hum Hain Rahi Pyaar Ke – Nadeem–Shravan
- Khalnayak – Laxmikant–Pyarelal
- Rudaali – Bhupen Hazarika

=== Best Lyricist ===
Hum Hain Rahi Pyaar Ke – Sameer for Ghunghat Ki Aad Se

- Baazigar – Dev Kohli for Yeh Kaali Kaali Aankhen
- Darr – Anand Bakshi for Jaadu Teri Nazar
- Khalnayak – Anand Bakshi for Choli Ke Peeche Kya Hai
- Rudaali – Gulzar for Dil Hum Hum

=== Best Playback Singer, Male ===
Baazigar – Kumar Sanu for Yeh Kaali Kaali Aankhen

- Anari – Udit Narayan for Phoolon Sa Chehra Tera
- Baazigar – Kumar Sanu for Baazigar O Baazigar
- Darr – Udit Narayan for Jaadu Teri Nazar
- Khalnayak – Vinod Rathod for Nayak Nahin

=== Best Playback Singer, Female ===
Khalnayak – Alka Yagnik and Ila Arun for Choli Ke Peeche Kya Hai

- Baazigar – Alka Yagnik for Baazigar O Baazigar
- Hum Hain Rahi Pyaar Ke – Alka Yagnik for Hum Hain Rahi Pyaar Ke & ghoonghat Ki aad
- Khalnayak – Alka Yagnik for Paalki Pe Ho Ke Sawaar

=== Best Action ===
Gardish

=== Best Art Direction ===
Gardish

=== Best Choreography ===
Khalnayak – Saroj Khan for Choli Ke Peeche Kya Hai

=== Best Cinematography ===
Darr - Manmohan Singh

=== Best Editing ===
Gardish

=== Best Sound ===
Damini

=== Lifetime Achievement Award ===
Dilip Kumar and Lata Mangeshkar

== Critics' awards ==
=== Best Film ===
Kabhi Haan Kabhi Naa

=== Best Actor ===
Shah Rukh Khan – Kabhi Haan Kabhi Naa

=== Best Documentary ===
I Live in Behrampada

== Biggest Winners ==
- Baazigar – 4/10
- Damini – 4/7
- Hum Hain Rahi Pyaar Ke – 3/7
- Gardish – 3/6
- Sir – 2/4
- Darr – 2/10
- Khalnayak – 2/11

== See also ==
- 40th Filmfare Awards
- 41st Filmfare Awards
- Filmfare Awards
