= Jole Jongole =

- Film poster
- Bengali: জলে জঙ্গলে
- Directed by: Nitish Roy
- Written by: Nitish Roy; Debaditya Dutta
- Produced by: Surajit Das; Kallol Das; Ranjan Bhattacharjee (Executive Producer)
- Starring: Mithun Chakraborty; Jackie Shroff; Ashish Vidyarthi; Tinnu Anand
- Cinematography: Badal Sarkar
- Edited by: Rabiranjan Maitra
- Music by: Jeet Gannguli
- Production company: Princes Art Production
- Release date: 5 January 2018
- Running time: 145 minutes
- Country: India
- Language: Bengali

Jole Jongole is a 2018 Indian Bengali-language science-fantasy action film directed by Nitish Roy, who was the production designer for the Hollywood horror film Crocodile 2: Death Swamp.

The film stars Mithun Chakraborty as a 'mad' scientist who wants to bring back prehistoric creatures, perished millions of years ago from the earth as he is trying to expand the brain of crocodiles. Jackie Shroff stars as the antagonist who wants to take control of dangerous crocodiles for his own park.

A few scenes of the film were shot in Prayag Film City in West Midnapore, and shooting was completed by early 2012, but got stuck in development hell and was finally released on 6 January 2018.

== Plot ==
The film is based on the experiment done by a mad scientist (Mithun) who comes up with a lovable crocodile. Like the dolphins, this crocodile was implanted with intelligence. At this point, an NRI (Jackie) eyes this project as he wants to build his own Jurassic Park and wants to gain control of this crocodile.

== Cast ==
- Mithun Chakraborty
- Jackie Shroff
- Ashish Vidyarthi
- Tinnu Anand
- Dibyendu Bhattacharya
- Dijana Dejanovic
- Biswajit Chakraborty
- Mumtaz Sorcar
- Titas Bhowmick
- Pamela Singh Bhutoria
- Sayantani Guhathakurta
- Riju Biswas
- Sayak
- Rajdeep Gupta
- Anindya Chatterjee
- Dhruba Lal
- Mumaith Khan as item number ""

== Soundtrack ==
Jole Jongole

Soundtrack album by Jeet Gannguli
- Released: 2018
- Recorded: 2017
- Genre: Feature film soundtrack
- Label: Princes Art Production
- Producers: Surajit Das, Kallol Das, Ranjan Bhattacharjee (Executive Producer)

Jeet Gannguli chronology
Jio Pagla (2017)	Jole Jongole (2018)	Phir Se... (2018)

Singles from Jole Jongole
- 1. "Premer Infection (Dil ki Kite)" Released: 8 Jan 2018; 2. "College Er Canteen E Party Jomabo" Released: 9 Jan 2018; 3. "Banzara Yeh Dil" Released: 10 Jan 2018; 4. "Ei Mon" Released: 12 Jan 2018

All lyrics are written by Priyo Chatterjee; all music is composed by Jeet Gannguli.

No.	Title	Singer(s)	Length
1.	"Premer Infection (Dil ki Kite)"	Aditi Singh Sharma, Neeraj Shridhar	4:09
2.	"College Er Canteen E Party Jomabo"	Jeet Gannguli	3:16
3.	"Banzara Yeh Dil"	Sunidhi Chauhan, Rana Mazumdar	4:14
4.	"Ei Mon"	Monali Thakur, Shaan	3:53

== Remake ==
The film will be remade in Hindi as Gehra Paani with a higher budget than the Bengali version. For the Hindi version, the cast and location will remain same except Mithun Chakraborty, who will be replaced by Bollywood actor Sanjay Dutt. Both the versions are being made at a budget of ₹25 crore (US$2.6 million) and would be shot in the Sunderban.
