= Bharatamlo Arjunudu =

- Theatrical poster
- Directed by: K. Raghavendra Rao
- Written by: Dialogues: Paruchuri Brothers
- Screenplay by: K. Raghavendra Rao
- Story by: Javed Akhtar
- Based on: Arjun (1985) by Rahul Rawail
- Produced by: K S Prakash Rao
- Starring: Venkatesh; Khushbu
- Cinematography: K. S. Prakash
- Edited by: Kotagiri Venkateswara Rao
- Music by: Chakravarthy
- Production company: Prakash Studios
- Release date: 29 May 1987
- Running time: 140 minutes
- Country: India
- Language: Telugu

Bharatamlo Arjunudu (transl. Arjuna in India) is a 1987 Telugu-language film directed by K. Raghavendra Rao and produced by K. S. Prakash Rao under the Prakash Studios banner. It stars Venkatesh and Khushbu, with music composed by Chakravarthy. The film was a remake of Hindi film Arjun. The film was as a flop at the box office.

== Plot ==
Arjun is unemployed but tolerant and kind-hearted and stays with his father Dasaradharamayah, stepmother, and stepsister Kalyani. One day Arjun beats up some ruffians who are thrashing a poor man for not paying extortion, headed by Ungarala Ramappa and Ungarala Kishtappa, protected by MLA Benerjee. With this incident, Arjun's life changes; he invokes the wrath of the local goon. Ugarala Kishtapa warns Arjun's parents and insults his sister, and the infuriated Arjun thrashes him and destroys all his activities. Arjun is arrested, and C.I. Keshava Rao's henchmen go to Benerjee let him off with a warning, but an Inspector Shekar notes that Arjun is doing the right thing, later he also begins to fall in love with Arjun's sister Kalyani. Arjun has also fallen in love with Sensational Subhadra, a journalist at his college meeting.

Soon, Arjun begins to grab public attention, MLA Benerjee also learns about Arjun and suspects that Arjun is working for his rival Ranganayakulu, a social reformer. Banerjee orders that Arjun and his friends be eliminated; The gang attacks and kills one of Arjun's friends Gokhale, who is killed in public. Though Arjun tries his best, no one comes forward to give witness to the murder out of fear, because of which the killers are let free. Soon Arjun's family put him out of the house, he is approached by Ranganayakulu, who invites him to his house and treats him as his son. With Arjun's help, Ranganayakulu destroys all the illegal activities of Benerjee, gets his sister Kalyani's marriage with Shekar at her request, and also handles the shop owner where his father is working, for ill-treating the latter. Finally, Ranganayakulu tells Arjun to get some secret files and documents against Benerjee, which can be used to expose him in public. Arjun gets that secret file at the risk of his life.

Now the story takes a twist; Arjun discovers that Ranganayakulu is a jackal who played the double game with him and has joined hands with Benerjee and that none of the evidence he collected has been published anywhere, as promised. Frustrated and angered, Arjun goes to fight the politicians at their speech rally but is simply thrown out. Finally, Arjun recollects all the evidence and presents it to the public and court, the criminals are arrested and the film ends with Arjun and Subhadra's marriage.

== Cast ==
- Venkatesh as Arjun
- Khushbu as Sensational Subhadra(Voice Dubbed by Durga)
- Rao Gopal Rao as M. L. A. Benerjee
- Allu Ramalingaiyah as Subhadra's father
- Nutan Prasad as C. I. Keshava Rao
- Ranganath as Ranganayakulu
- Kota Srinivasa Rao as Chenchuramayah
- Sudhakar as Inspector Shekar
- Paruchuri Brothers as Ungarala Ramappa and Ungarala Kishtappa
- Chalapathi Rao as Mallesh
- Sai Kumar as Gokhale
- P. L. Narayana as Dasaratharamaiah
- Chitti Babu as Bullet
- Chidatala Appa Rao as Tea Stale Babai
- Mada as Panganamala Ranganatham
- Mucharalla Aruna as Jyothi
- Samyuktha as Kalyani
- Kuyili as a Club Dancer
- Tatineni Rajeswari as Arjun's stepmother
- Kalpana Rai as Miss Swapna
- Nirmalamma as Gokhale's Bamma
- Manik Irani as Tiger

== Soundtrack ==
Bharatamlo Arjunudu

Film score by Chakravarthy
- Released: 1987
- Genre: Soundtrack
- Length: 21:37
- Label: Lahari Music
- Producer: Chakravarthy

Chakravarthy chronology
| Ajeyudu (1987) | Bharatamlo Arjunudu (1987) | Pasivadi Pranam (1987) |

Music composed by Chakravarthy. Lyrics written by Jonnavithhula Ramalingeswara Rao. Music released on Lahari Music.

| S.No | Song title | Singers | length |
|---|---|---|---|
| 1 | "Nee Magasiri Mashala" | S. P. Balasubrahmanyam, S. Janaki | 4:16 |
| 2 | "Gongura Selona" | S. P. Balasubrahmanyam, S. Janaki | 4:30 |
| 3 | "Andhala Konalo" | S. P. Balasubrahmanyam, S. Janaki | 4:51 |
| 4 | "Nee Magasiri" | S. P. Balasubrahmanyam, S. Janaki | 4:48 |
| 5 | "Agni Sikhala" | S. P. Balasubrahmanyam | 3:12 |
| 6 | "Ee Maya Joodam Aadakuraa" | S. P. Balasubrahmanyam | 3:06 |
