= Dijana Dejanović =

Serbian model, and actress

- Born: 17 July 1979 (age 46); Banja Luka, SFR Yugoslavia
- Citizenship: Serbia
- Occupations: Model; Actress
- Years active: 2015–present

Dijana Dejanović (born 17 July 1979) is a Serbian model, and actress known for her works in Bollywood and European cinema. Dejanović is a noted model, and has modeled for several international brands such as The Telegraph-t2. She made her Hindi cinema debut with Main Aur Charles (2015).

== Filmography ==
Year	Film	Role	Language	Notes
2015	Main Aur Charles	Charles's Lawyer	Hindi	Debut
2018	Jole Jongole		Bengali	Debut
2018	Namastey England		Hindi	
