= Berlin (2023 film) =

2024 Hindi thriller film

- Official release poster
- Directed by: Atul Sabharwal
- Written by: Atul Sabharwal
- Produced by: Manav Shrivastav; Umesh Kr Bansal
- Starring: Rahul Bose; Aparshakti Khurana; Ishwak Singh; Anupriya Goenka; Kabir Bedi
- Cinematography: Shreedutta Namjoshi
- Edited by: Irene Dhar Malik
- Music by: K
- Production companies: Zee Studios; Yippie Ki Yay Motion Pictures
- Distributed by: ZEE5
- Release dates: November 2023 (Los Angeles); 13 September 2024
- Running time: 119 minutes
- Country: India
- Language: Hindi

Berlin is a 2023 Indian Hindi-language spy thriller film written and directed by Atul Sabharwal, produced by Zee Studios and Yippie Ki Yay Motion Pictures. It stars Aparshakti Khurana, Ishwak Singh, Rahul Bose, Anupriya Goenka, and Kabir Bedi. The film had its world premiere at Indian Film Festival of Los Angeles 2023. The film released on 13 September 2024 on ZEE5 to positive reviews from critics.

== Synopsis ==
Set in New Delhi, India, in 1993, the film follows a deaf-mute young man Ashok, who is accused of being a foreign spy. A sign language expert named Pushkin Verma is brought in to interpret for the government during his interrogation. As the mystery unfolds, the line between guilt and innocence becomes blurred and the sign language expert finds himself caught in a dangerous web of deceit and political intrigue.

== Cast ==
- Aparshakti Khurana as Pushkin Verma
- Ishwak Singh as Ashok
- Rahul Bose as Sondhi (the intelligence officer)
- Anupriya Goenka
- Nitesh Pandey as Mehta
- Kabir Bedi as bureau chief
- Joy Sengupta, father of the girl proposed for Pushkin

== Production ==
The film was produced by Zee Studios and Yippie Ki Yay Motion Pictures. They started shooting for the film in February 2022. The shoots were wrapped up by April of the same year. Atul Sabharwal, who had previously directed acclaimed films like Class of '83 and Aurangzeb, wrote and directed the film.

== Music ==
The background score for Berlin was composed by Krishna Kumar, professionally known as K. The music in Berlin is noted for enhancing the film's atmospheric tension and contributing to its suspenseful narrative.

== Release ==
Berlin premiered at the Indian Film Festival of Los Angeles 2023. This was followed by an Indian premiere at Mumbai Film Festival, 2023.

The movie went on to be screened at the Indian Film Festival of Melbourne 2024, Habitat Film Festival and Red Lorry Film Festival.

It was released on ZEE5 on 13 September 2024.

== Awards ==
Ishwak Singh won the Best Actor Award for the movie at Stars Asian International Film Festival (SAIFF) in Los Angeles.

== Reception ==
Berlin received positive reviews from critics.

Mayur Sanap of Rediff.com gave the film 4/5 stars and recommends "Make time for this one, you will be in for a pleasant surprise like I was." Dhaval Roy of The Times of India gave 4 stars out of 5 and said "Despite some flaws, Berlin is a masterclass in suspenseful storytelling and character development. It is a must-watch for fans of spy thrillers and those seeking a film that offers more than just surface-level excitement." Zinia Bandyopadhyay of India Today rated 3.5/5 writes in her review that "Berlin is a good watch that you will be hooked onto. Yes, it would have been a good big screen watch, but it is just as enjoyable on the small screens." Saibal Chatterjee of NDTV gave 3 stars out of 5 and said that "The film deserves kudos for its refusal to kowtow to the current demands of the Bollywood spy movie template" Vinamra Mathur of the Firstpost gave 3 stars out of 5 and observes that "Aparshakti Khurana and Ishwak Singh's chemistry is in sync with the required restlessness of the story and situation. But the film cannot save itself from certain cliches. Mayank Shekhar of Mid-Day gave 3 stars out of 5 and stated that "The film looks cold, in a John le Carré space, like Cold War itself. It helps that you feel the same way about the two leads as well." A critic from Bollywood Hungama gave 2 out of 5 stars and wrote "Berlin rests on the terrific performances by Ishwak Singh and Aparshakti Khurana. However, the film disappoints due to the slow narrative and a very poor second half." Shubhra Gupta of The Indian Express gave 2 stars out of 5 and writes in her review that "At no point did I feel a sense of fear for any of the characters. 'Berlin''s world, where faceless, nameless characters live in the shadows, doing shadowy things, tries inhabiting John le Carre's territory. Have you ever tried reading one of his classics without holding your breath? Here, there's no dread, only a spreading dullness. This spy-fest left me cold. Anuj Kumar of The Hindu observers that "Mood and meaning mingle as director Atul Sabharwal lifts the iron curtain to expose the mean side of the spy business". Rishabh Suri writes for Hindustan Times that "Berlin deserves a watch for the atmospherics and conviction the maker and cast place in it". Nandini Ramnath of Scroll.in writes in her review that "Berlin is gripping in its fashion, skillfully deploying deafness as both metaphor and weapon. Sabharwal meshes the melancholy of John Le Carré novels with the foreboding quality of Alan J Pakula's films to imagine Delhi as the stage for a pantomime of democracy. The movie is a unique contribution to the spy fiction genre, set in a world that has never been seen before on the Indian screen."
