= Damini =

1993 Indian film by Rajkumar Santoshi

- Theatrical release poster
- Directed by: Rajkumar Santoshi
- Screenplay by: Rajkumar Santoshi
- Dialogues by: Dilip Shukla
- Story by: Sutanu Gupta
- Produced by: Karim Morani; Bunty Soorma; Aly Morani
- Starring: Rishi Kapoor; Meenakshi Sheshadri; Amrish Puri; Sunny Deol; Kulbhushan Kharbanda; Paresh Rawal; Anjan Srivastav; Vijayendra Ghatge; Tinnu Anand; Rohini Hattangadi; Prajakta Kulkarni
- Cinematography: Ishwar Bidri
- Edited by: V. N. Mayekar
- Music by: Score: Vanraj Bhatia; Songs: Nadeem–Shravan
- Production company: Cineyug
- Distributed by: Cineyug
- Release date: 30 April 1993
- Running time: 150 minutes
- Country: India
- Language: Hindi
- Box office: est. ₹ 11.75 crore

Damini (transl. Lightning) is a 1993 Indian Hindi-language legal drama film directed and co-written by Rajkumar Santoshi. The film stars Meenakshi Seshadri in the titular role, Rishi Kapoor, Amrish Puri and Sunny Deol, along with Kulbhushan Kharbanda and Paresh Rawal. Aamir Khan makes a special appearance. The story revolves around Damini who witnesses her housemaid being raped by her brother-in-law and his friends. Despite facing many obstacles, she strives to get justice for herself with the help of her husband and Govind, a lawyer. The film is considered one of the best woman-centric films ever made in Bollywood.

When it was released on April 30, 1993, the film immediately made an impact. It was not only universally acclaimed by critics but also dominated the box office to become a blockbuster hit. Damini – Lightning marked Meenakshi Seshadri's career best performance that was highly acclaimed.

It is considered a cult feminist film and is still regarded as an all-time classic female oriented film and important for portraying women empowerment in cinema. The pathbreaking film was praised for breaking social taboos and handling the subject of rape with sensitivity; a rarity in Bollywood at the time.

The movie is highly memorable for Deol's outstanding performance. He portrayed an alcoholic lawyer and the role gained him a Filmfare as well as National Film Award for Best Supporting Actor for 1993. It strengthened his Bollywood he-man image. His dialogues in the film "Tarikh Pe Tarikh" ("Date after date") and "Dhai Kilo Ka Haath" ("Two-and-a-half kilogram hand") became iconic and pop-culture references. For Sunny Deol, Meenakshi Sheshadri and Amrish Puri, this film was a significant career milestone, cementing their successful collaboration that also generated the blockbusters Ghayal (1990) and Ghatak (1996). Aamir Khan acted in a special appearance in the stage show dance song. He also promotes his upcoming film Andaz Apna Apna (1994) which was also directed by Rajkumar Santoshi.

Damini is the recipient of a number of accolades. At the 40th National Film Awards, Deol won Best Supporting Actor. In addition to other awards, the film received seven nominations at the 39th Filmfare Awards including Best Film, Best Actress for Seshadri, and Best Villain for Puri. It won a 4 leading awards — Best Director for Santoshi, Best Supporting Actor for Deol, Best Story for Sutanu Gupta, and Best Sound for Rakesh Ranjan.

== Plot ==
Shekhar Gupta is the elder son of wealthy industrialist Kedarnath Gupta. He falls in love at first sight with a girl named Damini after seeing her dance performance at a charity event. Damini belongs to a lower-middle-class family but tends to raise her voice against injustices in society. Her sister eloped with a drunkard mimicry artist, Birju, to Mumbai, in a bid to relieve her father from the onus of arranging a dowry for her wedding.

Damini and Shekhar get married, and Damini moves into his luxurious bungalow. However, this irks Tolu Bajaj, the Guptas' business partner who had been planning to marry his daughter to Shekhar. Bajaj breaks his business partnership with the Guptas and begins to conspire against them. Damini befriends Urmi, a young maidservant who was brought up in the Guptas' house. On the festival of Holi, she witnesses Shekhar's younger brother, Rakesh, and his friends gang-raping Urmi and rushes to tell Shekhar. Shekhar rushes over to prevent the sexual assault but arrives too late. Later, Rakesh and his friends throw Urmi by the roadside.

The Gupta family conspires to cover up this shameful incident. But Damini decides to inform the police. Shekhar tries to convince her not to say anything to the police. When the police visit their home and ask Damini about the incident, she denies having any knowledge of it. Later, it is revealed that it is Tolu Bajaj who bribed the police department to escalate the matter in order to tarnish the Guptas' image. The matter is taken up in court and Damini is asked to testify. The Guptas then hire the top lawyer, Barrister Inderjit Chaddha, as their defence counsel. At the first hearing, Chaddha portrays Damini as a mentally unstable person, and she is confined in a mental institution for two weeks by judicial order.

At this, Shekhar gets upset with his family while the Guptas and Bajaj reunite. At the mental institution, Damini overhears Rakesh asking the doctor to deliberately make Damini mentally ill or even kill her and frame it as a suicide. Damini escapes and runs into a down-and-out alcoholic advocate, Govind Srivastav, who saves her from the culprits chasing her. Govind gave up the legal profession after he failed to secure justice for his wife, Aarti, who was fatally struck on a footpath by a vehicle driven by an intoxicated, wealthy man. Govind, however, decides to help Damini. He gets the rape case reopened. Following this, Chaddha and the Guptas have Urmi murdered in the hospital and try to frame it as a suicide.

At the second hearing, Govind cross-examines the Guptas' driver and is successful in proving that the driver also knew about the incident. He also proves that the suicide note found by police near Urmi's body was fake. Seeing the situation getting out of hand, Chaddha fakes chest pain and asks the court for an adjournment. Later that night, Chaddha meets Govind and asks him to settle out of court. However, an angry Govind challenges him to face him in the courtroom. Following this, the Guptas send goons to kill Govind, but he defeats them in a fight. Damini goes out in public and garners support. Drivers, servants, and other relatives, fed up with the incident, leave the Guptas' house.

Before the next court hearing, Chaddha, the Guptas, and Bajaj plan to kill Damini. Shekhar overhears this and vows to stand by Damini come what may. Later, he is attacked by goons on the road and kidnapped. Shekhar's uncle sees this and goes to rescue him. Meanwhile, Bajaj, along with his men, tries to kill Damini while she is going to court. However, they themselves are attacked by local people who shoo them off. At the court, Chaddha requests an adjournment, stating that both Damini and Shekhar are absconding. Govind, however, convinces the judge to wait for Damini. After a short delay, Damini arrives, followed shortly by Shekhar. Both then testify as witnesses to the incident. The court convicts Rakesh and his friends and also sentences the Guptas, along with Bajaj and Chaddha, as accused for covering up the case. Shekhar is spared for helping achieve justice, and the court thanks Damini for her resilience and resolve, stating that she has set a historic example in the history of law and order.

== Cast ==
- Rishi Kapoor as Shekhar Gupta, Damini's husband
- Meenakshi Seshadri as Damini, Shekhar's wife
- Amrish Puri as Inderjit Chaddha, Gupta family's lawyer
- Sunny Deol as Govind Srivastav, Damini's Lawyer
- Kulbhushan Kharbanda as Kedarnath Gupta, Shekhar's father
- Paresh Rawal as Tolu Bajaj
- Tinnu Anand as Shekhar's uncle
- Vijayendra Ghatge as Inspector Kishore Kadam
- Rohini Hattangadi as Sumitra Gupta, Shekhar's mother
- Prajakta Kulkarni as Urmi, Gupta family's maid-servant
- Sulabha Arya as Shekhar's aunt
- Viju Khote as Mangesh
- Achyut Potdar as Commissioner of Police
- K.K. Raina as Shekhar's friend
- Aanjjan Srivastav as Chandrakant, Damini's father
- Asha Sharma as Mrs. Chandrakant, Damini's mother
- Suhas Bhalekar as Urmi's Grandfather
- Anu Dhawan as Devika, Damini's elder sister
- Ashwin Kaushal as Rakesh Gupta, Shekhar's younger brother
- Vishwajeet Pradhan as Commissioner of Police
- Virendra Saxena as Lawyer Saxena
- Madhav Moghe as Birju, Devika's husband
- Rubina as Lucy Bajaj
- Aamir Khan (cameo) as himself, dancer in the song "Bin Sajan Jhoola Jhoolu"
- Raveena Tandon (photo cameo) as Aarti Srivastav, Govind's deceased wife (present in a framed photograph)
- Irshad Hashmi as Mewalal Mithaiwala

== Production ==
Rishi Kapoor suggested Santoshi to cast Sridevi in the title role whereas Sunny Deol thought that she would be a misfit for the role. Deol suggested to cast Dimple Kapadia instead but that did not materialize. Santoshi offered the role to Madhuri Dixit who could not do it because of her conflicting dates with a previously signed film. Meenakshi Seshadri was then finalized to portray the role.

== Music and soundtrack ==
Damini (Original Motion Picture Soundtrack)

Soundtrack album by Nadeem–Shravan
- Released: 1993
- Recorded: 1992
- Venue: Bombay
- Studio: Sunny Super Sound
- Genres: Motion Picture Soundtrack, Filmi
- Length: 31:25
- Language: Hindi
- Label: His Master's Voice
- Producer: Nadeem–Shravan

The music for the movie's songs was composed by the music duo Nadeem–Shravan and the lyrics were penned by Sameer. The background score of the film was done by Vanraj Bhatia.

The soundtrack was released in 1993 on Audio Cassette and Audio CD in His Master's Voice Music Made in India and EMI Made in England, Which consist 5 Songs. The full album is recorded by Kumar Sanu, Alka Yagnik, and Sadhna Sargam.

The song "Gawah Hain Chand Taare Gawah Hai" is based on the Swahili folk song "Malaika".

Damini (Original Motion Picture Soundtrack)
No.	Title	Singer(s)	Length
1.	"Bin Sajan Jhoola Jhoolu"	Kumar Sanu & Sadhana Sargam	6:15
2.	"Gawah Hai Chand Tare"	Kumar Sanu & Alka Yagnik	6:16
3.	"Kaga To Ud Gaya"	Alka Yagnik	5:16
4.	"Jab Se Tumko Dekha"	Kumar Sanu & Sadhana Sargam	5:12
5.	"Sachcha Ashiq Hai To"	Alka Yagnik & Kumar Sanu	8:23
6.	"Tandav (Instrumental)"		2:21
Total length:			31:25

== Critical reception ==
The film received universal acclaim for its execution and outstanding performances by Sunny Deol and Meenakshi Sheshadri. Vineeta Sinha in her review praises the film for its tight bound script, courtroom scenes, music and above all the career best performance of Meenakshi.

Sulagana Biswas of Telegraph India; states the film despite being dated is still "eminently watchable" and also praising Sheshadri's portrayal of the title role states, "the film still holds its own due to the earnestness of Meenakshi Sheshadri's performance".

Simantini Dey writing for News18 hailed the film as a "cult feminist film" and stated "Damini - released in 1993 - is perhaps one of the most misunderstood films in Hindi cinema history. Despite receiving instant critical acclaim upon its release and having a successful run at the box-office, we as an audience have celebrated this film for all the wrong reasons. Yes, Sunny Deol's punchy dialogues like, "Tarikh par Tarikh milti rahi hai, lekin insaaf nahi mila, my lord!" deserved all the claps and whistles it received, and the theatrics of the courtroom drama, wherein two lawyers Govind (Sunny Deol) and Mr. Indrajit Chaddha (Amrish Puri) exchange angry words and stares indeed make for a great Bollywood entertainer. But the real reason why Damini was such an iconic film and deserves a cult status is the protagonist of the film - Damini (played brilliantly by Meenakshi Seshadri). Till date, Hindi cinema has not given us such a strong and beautifully written female character as Damini, who not only has a mind of her own, but also a conscience. Long before films like Pink (2016) and Raazi (2018) were made in Bollywood, Rajkumar Santoshi's Damini gave us a Hit feminist movie with a female central character, who fights against all odds to bring justice to another woman."

== Accolades ==
Ceremony	Category	Recipient	Result
40th National Film Awards	Best Supporting Actor	Sunny Deol	Won
39th Filmfare Awards	Best Supporting Actor	Sunny Deol	Won
39th Filmfare Awards	Best Director	Rajkumar Santoshi	Won
39th Filmfare Awards	Best Story	Sutanu Gupta	Won
39th Filmfare Awards	Best Sound	Rakesh Ranjan	Won
39th Filmfare Awards	Best Film	Damini	Nominated
39th Filmfare Awards	Best Actress	Meenakshi Seshadri	Nominated
39th Filmfare Awards	Best Villain	Amrish Puri	Nominated

== Remakes ==
Damini – Lightning was remade into Odia as Nari Nuhne Tu Narayani, starring Sidhanta Mohapatra and Rachana Banarjee, in Tamil as Priyanka, starring Revathi as the title character, in Telugu as Urmila, starring Suman and Malashri, and in Bangladesh as Sottyer Bijoy, starring Manna and Moushumi, directed by F.I. Manik. A Kannada remake titled Deepavali was announced in 1998 and was to be directed by D. Rajendra Babu starring Shiva Rajkumar, Ravichandran, Prakash Raj, and Prema, but was later dropped.

The film was declared a blockbuster at box-office. The rights of the movie were owned by Shah Rukh Khan's Red Chillies Entertainment, which were transferred to Sunny Deol who plans to remake the film with his son Karan Deol.
