= Lucky Morani =

Indian fashion designer, model, and actress

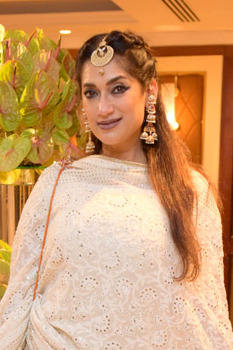
- Morani in 2018
- Born: Mumbai, India
- Education: Fashion design
- Alma mater: Narsee Monjee College of Commerce and Economics; SNDT Women's University
- Occupations: Event manager, fashion designer, model, actress
- Spouse: Mohammed Morani
- Relatives: Karim Morani (brother-in-law); Aly Morani (brother-in-law); Zoa Morani (niece)

Lucky Morani is an Indian fashion designer, model, stage and film actress. Morani is a noted fashion designer, and has designed, and modeled for several brands in India. In 2014, she ventured into mainstream acting with the bollywood crime thriller film Main Aur Charles.

== Early career and cinema ==
Morani was born in Mumbai, India. She did her schooling at St. Joseph's Convent High School, Mumbai. She holds a Bachelor of Commerce from Narsee Monjee College of Commerce and Economics, and Diploma in Fashion design from SNDT Women's University. Morani was an apprentice to fashion designer Hemanth Trivedi. She subsequently worked as Creative and Event Planner for the Cineyug Group Of Companies. She subsequently ventured into theater and stage acting through playwright and director Nadira Babbar's works. Lucky Morani received the 'I Am Woman' women empowerment award in 2016.

== Personal life ==
Morani is married to Bollywood film producer Mohamed Morani, and sister-in-law of Karim Morani and Aly Morani, the owners of Cineyug Entertainment, one of India's event management companies.
