= Zoa Morani =

Indian model and actress

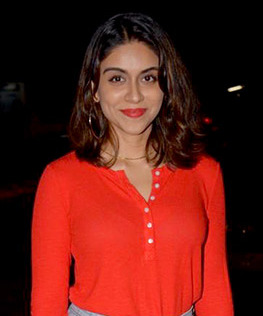
- Morani in 2018
- Born: 29 March 1988 (age 38); India
- Occupations: Actress, model
- Years active: 2011–present
- Father: Karim Morani
- Relatives: Aly Morani (uncle); Lucky Morani (aunt); Priyank Sharma (brother-in-law)

Zoa Morani (born 29 March 1988) is an Indian model and actress who appears in Bollywood films. She has appeared in films and web series with her notable works being Always Kabhi Kabhi (2011), Bhaag Johnny (2015), Taish (2020) and Tuesdays & Fridays (2021).

Morani is the daughter of film producer and co-owner of Cineyug, Karim Morani and the niece of film producers Aly Morani and Mohammed Morani. Her aunt Lucky Morani (wife of Mohammed) is a fashion designer and actress.

== Career ==
Morani started as an assistant director for the 2007 film Om Shanti Om and was assistant director for Halla Bol (2008). Morani had no interest in directing films, but took up these roles to familiarise herself with acting. She made her acting debut in Shahrukh Khan's production Always Kabhi Kabhi in 2011 and has been signed by film director Shyam Benegal for his next film. In 2011, she took up a modelling assignment during the Lakme Fashion Week. She has since appeared in the 2012 edition of the Lakme Fashion Week .

Morani was signed by Vikram Bhatt for his film Bhaag Johnny opposite Kunal Khemu and Mandana Karimi. The film was co-produced by Bhushan Kumar and Vikram Bhatt and released in 2015.

== Personal life ==
From the Morani family, she is the daughter of film producer Karim Morani who owns Cineyug with his brothers Aly Morani and Mohammed Morani (husband of Lucky Morani). Her sister is also affiliated with Cineyug and is married to actress Padmini Kolhapure's son Priyank Sharma. She is a Nizari Muslim. She got afflicted with COVID-19 during the height of its spread in India but subsequently recovered.

== Filmography ==
=== Films ===
Year	Title	Role	Notes
2011	Always Kabhi Kabhi	Nandini Oberoi	
2012	Mastaan		
2015	Bhaag Johnny	Tanya	
2020	Taish	Mahi	ZEE5 film
2021	Tuesdays and Fridays	Kajal	Netflix film
2024	Dange	Siddhi	

=== Web series ===
Year	Title	Role	Platform	Ref.
2018	Akoori	Jehan Irani	ZEE5	
2019	Bhoot Purva	Angelina	ZEE5	
2023	Dahaad	Vandana	Amazon Prime	
2023	Adhura	Malavika	Amazon Prime	

=== As assistant director ===
Year	Film
2007	Om Shanti Om
2008	Halla Bol
