= Arjun (1985 film) =

1985 film

- Theatrical release poster
- Directed by: Rahul Rawail
- Written by: Javed Akhtar
- Produced by: Karim Morani; Sunil Soorma
- Starring: Sunny Deol; Dimple Kapadia; Raj Kiran; Prem Chopra; Anupam Kher; A. K. Hangal; Supriya Pathak; Shafi Inamdar; Paresh Rawal; Raja Bundela; Satyajeet Puri; Annu Kapoor
- Cinematography: Baba Azmi
- Edited by: Dilip Kotalgi
- Music by: R. D. Burman
- Production company: Cineyug Films
- Distributed by: Eros International
- Release date: 20 April 1985
- Running time: 154 minutes
- Country: India
- Language: Hindi
- Budget: ₹1.5 crore
- Box office: ₹5.5 crore

Arjun is a 1985 Indian Hindi-language political action film directed by Rahul Rawail. Written by Javed Akhtar, the film stars Sunny Deol in the titular role, alongside Dimple Kapadia in the lead, while Raj Kiran, Prem Chopra, Anupam Kher, Paresh Rawal, A. K. Hangal and Supriya Pathak play other pivotal roles. The plot of the film revolves around a group of radical young men who take matters into their hands to fight against corruption.

The film was a big commercial success and catapulted Deol to superstardom. Sukanya Verma of Rediff.com called it Deol's best action film. This film also marked the debut of Paresh Rawal in commercial cinema. The rights to this film are now owned by Red Chillies Entertainment.

The film was later remade in Tamil as Sathyaa, in Telugu as Bharatamlo Arjunudu, in Kannada as Sangrama, and in Sinhala as Suranimala.

== Plot ==
The story focuses on the struggles of an educated, unemployed young man fighting against systemic corruption and injustice. The plot centres on Arjun Malvankar, a kind-hearted but volatile youth from a lower-middle-class family in Bombay. Frustrated by his unemployment and the widespread corruption he sees, Arjun's life changes when he stands up to local thugs and beats them up for extorting money.

This act of defiance puts him on a collision course with the city's criminal elements and their powerful and corrupt political patron, MLA Dindayal Trivedi. Arjun is initially arrested, but an honest police officer, Inspector Ravi Rane, recognizes that Arjun is essentially fighting on the side of justice. Arjun is approached by Geeta Sahni, a young primary school music teacher, who asks him for a favour, which he obliges. After a few subsequent meetings, they both fall in love.

After a retaliatory attack by the goons results in the public murder of one of Arjun's close friends, and no one comes forward to testify out of fear, Arjun is pushed to his limits. While Geeta offers him unwavering love and support, Arjun is shunned by his family who fear for their safety. Soon, he is approached by a rival politician, Shivkumar Chowgule.

Chowgule, appearing to be an upright and honest person, takes Arjun under his wing. He uses Arjun's strength and anti-corruption zeal to systematically dismantle Trivedi's illegal businesses and collect evidence against him, all under the guise of cleaning up the city. Arjun, believing he is working for a noble cause, is very successful.

The story takes a sharp turn when Arjun discovers that Chowgule is just as corrupt as Trivedi. Chowgule was merely using Arjun as a pawn to eliminate his rival and gather blackmail material for his own selfish gains. Disillusioned and betrayed, Arjun is thrown out and his resources are confiscated.

Now fully aware that both politicians are two sides of the same corrupt coin, a frustrated and enraged Arjun decides to take matters into his own hands. In a furious single-handed confrontation, Arjun barges into a gathering, beating up both Chowgule and Trivedi to seize the vital files that contain proof of their illegal activities. A climactic chase ensues, with Arjun pursued and wounded by Chowgule's goons. Despite his injuries, Arjun manages to escape and delivers the incriminating documents to the one honest man he trusts, Inspector Ravi Rane. The evidence leads to the arrest of both Chowgule and Trivedi, finally securing a defiant victory against corruption. The story concludes with a battered but victorious Arjun in the hospital, receiving a thumbs-up from Inspector Rane, signifying that the fight for justice, though costly, has been won.

== Cast ==
- Sunny Deol as Arjun Malvankar
- Dimple Kapadia as Geeta Sahni – Arjun's girlfriend
- Anupam Kher as Shivkumar Chaugle – Politician
- Prem Chopra as Dindayal Trivedi – MLA
- A. K. Hangal as Mr. Malvankar – Arjun's father
- Raj Kiran as Inspector Ravi Rane – Sudha's husband
- Supriya Pathak as Sudha Malvankar Rane – Arjun's step-sister
- Shashikala as Rukmini Malvankar – Mr. Malvankar's wife (after his first wife's death)
- Raja Bundela as Chander – Arjun's friend
- Satyajeet Puri as Mohan – Arjun's friend
- Shafi Inamdar as Anand Patkar
- Paresh Rawal as Anup Lal – Dindayal's henchman
- Annu Kapoor as Baburam – Chaugle's secretary
- Goga Kapoor as Ranga – Dindayal's henchman
- Leena Das as Exotic dancer – In the song "Dhadkan Pal Pal Badhti Jaaye"
- Jaspal Sandhu
- Ghanshyam Rohera as Ashok
- Jagdish Raj as Police Inspector
- Dev Kumar as Khanna
- Jagdarshan Samra as Chaugle's henchman
- Sheela David
- Vikas Anand

== Music and soundtrack ==
Arjun (Original Motion Picture Soundtrack)

Soundtrack album by R. D. Burman
- Released: 20 April 1985
- Recorded: 1984–1985
- Genres: Motion picture soundtrack, filmi
- Length: 21:55
- Language: Hindi
- Label: Music India
- Producer: R. D. Burman
External audio
- Arjun (Full Album) on YouTube

The music of this film was composed by R. D. Burman. Javed Akhtar had penned the lyrics of the songs.

Song	Singer
"Mammaiya Kero Mamma"	Shailendra Singh
"Bhuri Bhuri Aankhonwala"	Lata Mangeshkar
"Munni Pappu Aur Chunnum"	Asha Bhosle
"Dhadkan Pal Pal Badhti Jaaye"	Asha Bhosle

== Awards ==
33rd Filmfare Awards:

Nominated

- Best Film – Cineyug Films
- Best Director – Rahul Rawail
- Best Story – Javed Akhtar

== Legacy ==
In 2022, Farhan Akhtar described the film as his "all-time favourite", responding to Sunny Deol’s query about where he could watch the film online. Actor Paresh Rawal, who made his commercial debut with the movie, likewise referred to Arjun as "one of my favourite films", praising its writing and performances in the same discussion thread.
