= Aly Morani =

Indian film producer

- Born: Mumbai, Maharashtra, India
- Occupation: Film producer
- Spouse: Yasmin Aly Morani
- Children: Shirin Morani (daughter); Noureen Morani (daughter)
- Relatives: Karim Morani (brother); Lucky Morani (sister-in-law); Zoa Morani (niece); Uday J. Singh (son-in-law)
- Website: cineyug.com

Aly Morani is an Indian film producer who has produced films like Dum, Raja Hindustani, Damini, Arjun and Dushmani: A Violent Love Story. He, along with his brother Karim Morani, owns Cineyug which is a production and event company.

== Filmography ==
Year	Film	Role
1985	Arjun (1985 film)	As ( executive producer)
1989	Vardi (film)	As (producer)
1993	Damini	As ( producer)
1995	Dushmani: A Violent Love Story	As (producer).
1996	Raja Hindustani	As (Producer)
2003	Dum	As (Producer)

== Controversies ==
There was an attempt on his life by the Mumbai underworld.

== Personal life ==
He is married to Yasmin Aly Morani and the couple have two daughters Shirin (wife of Uday J. Singh, brother of Indian actor Vikram Singh) and Noureen Morani.
