= Karim Morani =

Indian film producer

- Born: Mumbai, Maharashtra, India
- Occupation: Film producer
- Spouse: Zara Morani
- Children: Zoa Morani; Shaza Morani
- Relatives: Aly Morani (brother); Lucky Morani (sister-in-law); Priyank Sharma (son-in-law)
- Website: cineyug.com

Karim Morani is an Indian film producer who has produced films like Arjun (1985) and Damini (1993) starring Sunny Deol. Later, he teamed up with Shahrukh Khan to co-produce Chennai Express and Ra.One starring Shahrukh Khan. Morani and his brother Aly Morani co-own Cineyug, which is a film production and event management company.

== Film career ==
Morani entered film production in 1985 with the super hit film Arjun which starred Sunny Deol and was directed by Rahul Rawail. His next produced movie was Vardi in 1989 which starred Sunny Deol and Jackie Shroff. He later produced the film Yodha in 1991, which was also directed by Rahul Rawail and starred Sunny Deol and Sanjay Dutt in lead roles. His next as a producer was the universally acclaimed 1993 film Damini which starred Sunny Deol, Meenakshi Seshadri and Rishi Kapoor, and was directed by Rajkumar Santoshi. In 1996, he produced Dushmani: A Violent Love Story starring Sunny Deol, Manisha Koirala and Jackie Shroff. Again later in 1996, he produced Raja Hindustani starring Aamir Khan and Karisma Kapoor. His next film as a producer came after a gap of seven years with Dum in 2003 directed by Eeshwar Nivas and starring Vivek Oberoi and Diya Mirza.

Following another gap of eight years, all his films have been co-productions with Shar Rukh Khan of films that star Khan. Morani's next release happened in 2011, after he teamed up with Shah Rukh Khan's production house Red Chillies Entertainment as an associate producer for the film Ra.One starring Khan. In 2013, he co-produced the commercially successful film Chennai Express, and in 2014, he was the associate producer for the film Happy New Year, both of which star Shah Rukh Khan in the lead role. In 2015, Morani co-produced Dilwale in association with Red Chillies Entertainment and Gauri Khan. The film was directed by Rohit Shetty and stars Shah Rukh Khan, Varun Dhawan and Kajol.

== Controversies ==
Morani has been dogged by several controversies during his career.

=== 2G spectrum case ===
Morani is an alleged accused in the 2G spectrum case. The Income Tax Department and the Central Bureau of Investigation (CBI) claim that Morani was a part of the conspiracy to illegally transfer funds to Kalaignar TV on the behest of Shahid Balwa and Vinod Goenka who are both co-accused in the 2G spectrum case. It was alleged that the promoters of DB Realty Shahid Balwa and Vinod Goenka transferred ₹2,092.5 million (US$33 million) to Kusegaon Fruits and Vegetables, in which Shahid Balwa's brother was a director. Kusegaon Fruits and Vegetables then transferred ₹2 billion (US$31 million) to Cineyug Films, and Morani then transferred it to Kalaignar TV. Morani was charged with Criminal conspiracy to cause criminal breach of trust by a public servant, criminal conspiracy, cheating, forgery, fabrication of evidence and also booked under the Prevention of Corruption Act. Morani was arrested by the Central Bureau of Investigation on 30 May 2011 and was subsequently granted bail on 28 November 2011. As of August 2012, Morani is facing trial in 2G spectrum case and has to appear at a Special CBI Court in New Delhi.

=== Mumbai underworld ===
On 23 August 2014, members of the Ravi Pujari gang made an attempt on the life of Morani. In 2018, A Delhi-based Model accused Morani of rape, blackmail and threatening to eliminated by underworld connection.

=== Allegations of rape ===
In 2017 Morani was booked by Hyderabad police for the rape of a 25-year-old Delhi-based student. On 23 September 2017, Morani had to surrender to the Hyderabad police following the order by the Supreme Court refusing to give Morani anticipatory bail in the alleged rape case against him.

== Personal life ==
Karim Morani is an Ismaili Muslim. He married Zara Morani and the couple has two daughters, Zoa and Shaza. Their older daughter Zoa Morani is an actress. Shaza is married to Priyaank Sharma, Padmini Kolhapure and Tutu Sharma's son.
