= List of Hindi songs recorded by K. S. Chithra =

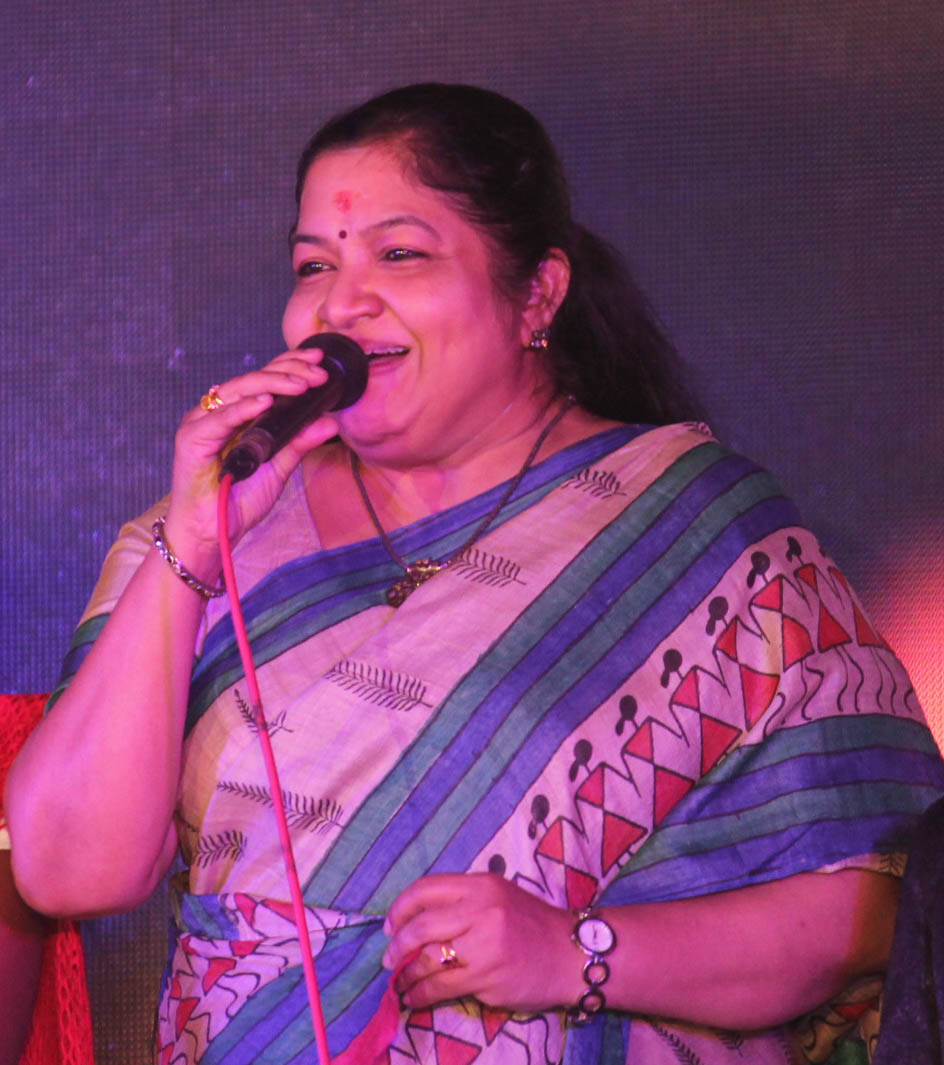
Chithra in 2015

K. S. Chithra was introduced to Hindi film music in 1985; she recorded her first Hindi song composed by S. P. Venkitesh, which was not commercially released. For the 1991 Hindi film Love, composers Anand–Milind, called upon her to sing duets song along with S. P. Balasubrahmanyam and since then, Chithra has recorded for around 200 Bollywood songs. Then she went on recording some Hindi songs under A. R. Rahman's compositions from 1991 to 1995, her breakthrough in Hindi film music came through "Kehna Hi Kya" from the film Bombay (1995), which was highly successful in the North Indian region and gave her an identity in Bollywood film industry ("Kehna Hi Kya" was included in The Guardian newspaper's "The 1000 songs that everyone must hear"). For the song "Payalein Chunmun" recorded in the 1997 film Virasat, Chithra received the National Film Award for Best Female Playback Singer and became the only South India based female singer till date to achieve the feat. Her most number of Hindi songs were recorded for Anu Malik, the most notable being her voice recorded for eight songs out of eleven in the soundtrack of Main Prem Ki Diwani Hoon in 2003.

Some of Chithra's memorable Hindi songs include "Ye Haseen Wadiyan" from Roja, "Yaaron Sun Lo" from Rangeela, "Hum Tumse Na" from Ziddi, "Payale Chunmun" from Virasat (she won a National Award, Star Screen Award and the nomination for FilmfareAwards for her rendition), "Raat Ka Nasha" from Aśoka, "Pyaar Tune Kya Kiya (sad version)", "Rang De Basanti" title track, "Mere Dil Ka Tumse Hi Kehna" from Armaan, "Mere Dil Ka Tumse Hi Kehna" from the film Armaan In the composition of Rajesh Roshan, she has sung "Koi Mil Gaya" title song of the film Koi... Mil Gaya for which she won Bollywood Movie Awards, MTV Immies Award and the nomination for Filmfare Awards. "Tum Bin Jiya Jaye Kaise" from the film Tum Bin topped the charts and she was lauded for her expressive rendition.

Apart from film songs, Chithra recorded for many private albums of which Piya Basanti and Sunset Point became hugely popular and went on to win several laurels including the MTV Music Video Awards. The popularity of the former album made her known among the Northern part of Indians identify her as "Piya Basanti" Chitra.

== Film songs ==
This is an incomplete list

Year	Film	Song	Composer(s)	Writer(s)	Co-artist(s)
1991	Love	"Saathiya Tune Kya Kiya"	Anand Milind	Majrooh Sultanpuri	S. P. Balasubrahmanyam (SPB)
1991	Love	"Aaja Aaja Give Me A Kiss"	Anand Milind	Majrooh Sultanpuri	S. P. Balasubrahmanyam (SPB)
1991	Love	"My Love Meri Priyatama"	Anand Milind	Majrooh Sultanpuri	S. P. Balasubrahmanyam (SPB)
1991	Love	"We Are Made For Each Other"	Anand Milind	Majrooh Sultanpuri	S. P. Balasubrahmanyam (SPB)
1991	Ashwini	"Koyal Kaali Daali"	M. M. Kreem		
1991	Ashwini	"Zindagi Yeh Dhool"	M. M. Kreem		
1991	Giraftaari	"Dekho Kitna Door Hai"	Ilaiyaraaja		
1991	Giraftaari	"Rimjhim Rimjhim"	Ilaiyaraaja		
1992	Drohi	"Jungle Dance"	Mani Sharma	Javed Akhtar	Jojo
1992	Drohi	"Dhadakti Mere Dil"	R. D. Burman	Javed Akhtar	
1992	Dharam Yodha	"Mujkho Yeh Lagta Hai"	A. R. Rahman	P. K. Mishra	
1992	Jaagruti	"Hawa Mei Kya Hai"	Anand Milind	Sameer	SPB
1992	Jaagruti	"Jalnewale To Jalte Rahenge"	Anand Milind	Sameer	SPB
1992	Jaagruti	"Hawa Mei Kya Hai (Sad)"	Anand Milind	Sameer	SPB
1992	Jaagruti	"Hawa Mei Kya Hai (Jhankar beats)"	Anand Milind	Sameer	SPB
1992	Roja	"Ye Haseen Wadiya"	A. R. Rahman	P. K. Mishra	SPB
1993	Ashaant	"Jaani Jaani Jaani"	Jatin–Lalit	Sameer	
1993	Santaan	"Aa Zara Kareeb Aa"	Anand Milind	Sameer Anjaan	SPB
1993	Chor Chor	"Jhoom Jhoom"	A. R. Rahman	P. K. Mishra	SPB
1993	Chor Chor	"Pyaar Kabhi Na"	A. R. Rahman	P. K. Mishra	Udit Narayan, Mano
1993	The Great Robbery	"O Raveena"	Raj–Koti		
1993	The Great Robbery	"Man Hai Beqabu"	Raj–Koti		
1994	Aaj Ka Romeo	"Ae Haseena Nazneena"	Deva		
1994	Aaj Ka Romeo	"Aye Jaani Dilbar Jaani"	Deva		
1994	Bhairav Dweep	"Aaye Teri Roop Rachana"	Madhavapeddi Suresh		
1994	The Gentleman	"Roop Suhana Lagta Hai"	A. R. Rahman (Reused By Anu Malik)	Indeevar	SPB
1994	The Gentleman	"Jhoom Ke Dil Ne"	Raj–Koti	Rajan Khera	SPB
1994	Sajna Doli Leke Aana	"Chitapata Aaja Gori"	M. M. Kreem		
1994	Suhaag	"Tere Liye Janam"	Anand Milind	Sameer	SPB
1994	Tejasvini	"Paisa Dewe To"	Laxmikant–Pyarelal		
1994	Tu Hi Mera Dil	"Anjali Anjali"	A. R. Rahman	P. K. Mishra	SPB
1995	Bombay	"Kehna Hi Kya"	A. R. Rahman	Mehboob	
1995	Criminal	"Tu Mile Dil"(Film Version)	M. M. Kreem	Indeevar	Kumar Sanu
1995	Criminal	"Keemti Keemti Hai"	M. M. Kreem	Indeevar	SPB, Alka Yagnik, M. M. Keeravani
1995	Criminal	"Kisi Ka Tu Hoja"	M. M. Kreem	Indeevar	Abhijeet Bhattacharya
1995	Haathkadi	"Jawani Mei Aag Lagi"	Anu Malik	Sameer	Anu Malik
1995	Haathkadi	"Janta Hu Manta Hu"	Anu Malik	Sameer	SPB
1995	Baasha	"Chehre Pe Dhoop"	Deva	Mehboob	K. J. Yesudas
1995	Maa Ki Shakti	"Ye Mann Pyasa Tera"	Sri Kommineni		
1995	Rangeela	"Yaaro Sunlo Zara"	A. R. Rahman	Mehboob	Udit Narayan
1995	Priyanka	"Thoda Thoda Pyar"(Version l)	A. R. Rahman	P. K. Mishra	SPB
1995	Priyanka	"Thoda Thoda Pyar"(Version ll)	A. R. Rahman		
1996	Khel Khiladi Ka	"Chumma De Chumma De"	A. R. Rahman	Mehboob	SPB
1996	Is Raat Ki Subah Nahin	"Dushmani Hogi"	M. M. Kreem	Nida Fazli	
1996	Is Raat Ki Subah Nahin	"Chup Tum Raho"	M. M. Kreem	Nida Fazli	M. M. Kreem
1996	Is Raat Ki Subah Nahin	"Hey Babu"	M. M. Kreem	Nida Fazli	SPB
1996	Is Raat Ki Subah Nahin	"Pehli Baar Mile"	M. M. Kreem	Nida Fazli	SPB
1996	Sazaa-E-Kalapani	"Zindagi Mei Tum Mile"	Ilaiyaraaja	P. K. Mishra	Hariharan
1996	Sazaa-E-Kalapani	"Bachpan Ke Saathi Mere"	Ilaiyaraaja	P. K. Mishra	Hariharan
1996	Sazaa-E-Kalapani	"Sandhya Ki Laali"	Ilaiyaraaja	P. K. Mishra	M. G. Sreekumar
1996	Sazaa-E-Kalapani	"Baaghon Ke Bahaare"	Ilaiyaraaja	P. K. Mishra	M. G. Sreekumar
1996	Maun	"Kya Haseen Raat Hai"	M. M. Kreem	Sameer	SPB
1996	Maun	"Pyar To Hua"	M. M. Kreem	Sameer	Udit Narayan, Sindhu
1996	Maun	"Sajna Mujhko Kya"	M. M. Kreem	Sameer	SPB
1997	Love Birds	"Milgaye Milgaye"	A. R. Rahman	Mehboob	Hariharan
1997	Aflatoon	"Tu Mange Dil"	Dileep Sen — Sameer Sen	Mehboob	Hariharan
1997	Pardes	"Jahaan Piya Wahan Main"	Nadeem Shravan	Anand Bakshi	Shankar Mahadevan
1997	Sapnay	"Ek Bagiya Mei"	A. R. Rahman	Javed Akhtar	Shankar Mahadevan, Srinivas
1997	Virasat	"Payalein Chunmun"(Duet)	Anu Malik	Javed Akhtar	Kumar Sanu
1997	Virasat	"Payalein Chunmun"(Female)	Anu Malik	Javed Akhtar	
1997	Ziddi	"Hum Tumse Na Kuchh"	Dileep Sen — Sameer Sen	Sameer	Hariharan
1997	Ziddi	"O Haseena"	Dileep Sen — Sameer Sen	Sameer	Kumar Sanu
1997	Ziddi	"Aji Suno Suno"	Dileep Sen — Sameer Sen	Sameer	Udit Narayan
1998	Chhota Chetan	"Chhota Chetan"	Anu Malik		
1998	Kabhi Na Kabhi	"Tu Hi Tu"	A. R. Rahman	Javed Akhtar	M. G. Sreekumar, A. R. Rahman
1998	Kabhi Na Kabhi	"Mere Yaara Dildara"	A. R. Rahman	Javed Akhtar	Hariharan, SPB
1998	Salaakhen	"Pagal Deewana Awaara"	Dilip Sen - Sameer Sen	Sameer	Vinod Rathod
1998	Salaakhen	"Zubaan Pe Jo"	Dilip Sen - Sameer Sen	Sameer	Udit Narayan
1998	Zakhm	"Maa Ne Kaha"	M. M. Kreem	Anand Bakshi	
1999	Hote Hote Pyar Ho Gaya	"Pyaar Wale Rang"	Anand Raaj Anand		
1999	Silsila Hai Pyar Ka	"Aaj Raat Ayega"	Jatin–Lalit	Sameer	
1999	Sooryavansham	"Dil Mere Tu Deewana"(Female)	Anu Malik	Sameer	
1999	Sooryavansham	"Har Subah Bahut Yaad"	Anu Malik	Sameer	Kumar Sanu
2000	Tera Jadoo Chal Gayaa	"Tera Jadoo Chal Gayaa"	Ismail Darbar	Sameer	Sonu Nigam
2000	Muthu Maharaja	"Phoolwali Ne Loota"	A. R. Rahman	PK Misra	Udit Narayan, G. V. Prakash Kumar
2001	Aks	"Hum Bhool Gaye"	Anu Malik	Gulzar	
2001	Asoka	"Raat Ka Nasha Abhi"(Female)	Anu Malik	Gulzar	
2001	Asoka	"Raat Ka Nasha Abhi"(Duet)	Anu Malik	Gulzar	Abhijeet Bhattacharya
2001	Pyaar Tune Kya Kiya	"Pyaar Tune Kya Kiya"	Sandeep Chowta	Nitin Raikwar	
2001	Paagalpan	"Dekhte Dekhte"	Raju Singh	Sameer	Srinivas
2001	Paagalpan	"Mera Dil"	Raju Singh	Sameer	Srinivas
2001	Tum Bin	"Tum Bin Jiya Jaye Kaise"	Nikhil-Vinay	Faaiz Anwar	
2001	Tum Bin	"Pyar Humko Hone Laga"	Nikhil-Vinay	Faaiz Anwar	Abhijeet Bhattacharya
2001	Little John	"Baila Re Baila"	Pravin Mani	Javed Akhtar	Clinton Cerejo, Gopi
2001	Jaana Na Dil Se Door	"Jaana Na Dil Se Door"	Dilip Sen - Sameer Sen	Neeraj	Udit Narayan
2001	Jaana Na Dil Se Door	"Tu Chala Jo Apni"	Dilip Sen - Sameer Sen	Kaifi Azmi	Hariharan, Udit Narayan
2001	Jaana Na Dil Se Door	"Yeh Dharti Gagan"	Dilip Sen - Sameer Sen	Neeraj	Kumar Sanu
2001	Jaana Na Dil Se Door	"Dil Mein Yeah Kaisa"	Dilip Sen - Sameer Sen	Neeraj	Kumar Sanu, Sanjeevani
2002	Agni Varsha	"Dole Re Mann Mora"	Sandesh Shandilya	Javed Akhtar	KK
2002	Filhaal...	"Kyun Baar Baar"	Anu Malik	Gulzar	
2002	Filhaal...	"Le Chale Doliyon Mei"	Anu Malik	Gulzar	Roop Kumar Rathod
2002	Filhaal...	"Naya Naya"	Anu Malik	Gulzar	KK
2002	Yeh Kaisi Mohabbat	"Pyar Hai Tumse"	Sandeep Chowta		Shaan
2003	Armaan	"Mere Dil Ka Tumse"	Shankar–Ehsaan–Loy	Javed Akhtar	
2003	Kahan Ho Tum	"Tan Man Pe Aaj"	Rajat Dholakia		
2003	Chota Jadugar	"Taare Soye Tu"	Sharreth		
2003	Fun 2shh: Dudes in the 10th Century	"Dhuan Dhuan Sa"	Pritam	Mayur Puri and Amitabh Bhattacharya	Sanjeevani
2003	Jaal: The Trap	"Jo Pyar Tumne"	Anand Raj Anand	Javed Akhtar	Zubeen Garg, Anand Raj Anand
2003	Koi... Mil Gaya	"Koi Mil Gaya"	Rajesh Roshan	Ibrahim Ashk	Udit Narayan
2003	Main Prem Ki Diwani Hoon	"Bani Bani"	Anu Malik	Dev Kohli	
2003	Main Prem Ki Diwani Hoon	"Chali Aayee"	Anu Malik	Dev Kohli	KK
2003	Main Prem Ki Diwani Hoon	"Sanjana I Love You"	Anu Malik	Dev Kohli	KK, Sunidhi Chauhan
2003	Main Prem Ki Diwani Hoon	"O Ajnabi"	Anu Malik	Dev Kohli	KK
2003	Main Prem Ki Diwani Hoon	"Kasam Ki Kasam"	Anu Malik	Dev Kohli	Shaan
2003	Main Prem Ki Diwani Hoon	"O Ajnabi"(Sad)	Anu Malik	Dev Kohli	KK
2003	Main Prem Ki Diwani Hoon	"Bhatke Panchi"	Anu Malik	Dev Kohli	
2003	Main Prem Ki Diwani Hoon	"Prem! Prem! Prem!"	Anu Malik	Dev Kohli	Shaan, KK
2003	Pyaar Kiya Nahin Jaatha	"Nazrein Mil Jaati Hai"	Anand Raaj Anand		Sonu Nigam
2004	Charas	"Tumhe Arpan"	Raju Singh	Javed Akhtar	Hariharan
2004	Kis Kis Ki Kismat	"Uff A Jawani"	D. Imman		
2004	Rudraksh	"Dil Ki Aahein"	Shashi Preetam	Shashi Pritam	KK
2004	Rudraksh	"Bole Dole"	Shashi Preetam	Shashi Pritam	Sandeep, Bhaumik, Shashi Pritam
2004	Uff Kya Jadoo Mohabbat Hai	"Tum Pe"	Sandesh Shandilya		Sonu Nigam
2004	Uff Kya Jadoo Mohabbat Hai	"Jagmug"	Sandesh Shandilya		Vinod Rathod
2005	Parineeta	"Raat Hamari Toh"	Shantanu Moitra	Javed Akhtar	Swanand Kirkire
2006	Rang De Basanti	"Rang De Basanti"	A. R. Rahman	Prasoon Joshi	Daler Mehndi
2006	Sri Ram Mandhir	"Dasharathi"	M. M. Kreem		
2007	Apna Asmaan	"Jhanana Jhanana"	Lesle Lewis		
2007	Guru	"Ek Lo Ek Muft"	A. R. Rahman	Gulzar	Bappi Lahari
2007	Guru	"Jaage Hain"	A. R. Rahman	Gulzar	A. R. Rahman, Madras Chorale Group
2007	Swami	"Swami"	Nitin Arora - Sony Chandy	Sameer	Hariharan
2007	Swami	"De Jab Duaayen"	Nitin Arora - Sony Chandy	Sameer	Hariharan
2007	Swami	"Aankhon Ki"	Nitin Arora - Sony Chandy	Sameer	Hariharan
2007	Swami	"Naa Tin Dhinna"	Nitin Arora - Sony Chandy	Sameer	Hariharan
2007	Swami	"Dhyaan"	Nitin Arora - Sony Chandy	Sameer	
2008	Via Darjeeling	"Baarish"	Prabuddha Banerjee	Mrityunjay Kumar Singh	
2009	13B	"Aasman Odhkar"	Shankar–Ehsaan–Loy	Neelesh Mishra	Shankar Mahadevan
2009	13B	"Aasman Odhkar"(Remix)	Shankar–Ehsaan–Loy	Neelesh Mishra	Shankar Mahadevan
2010	Ada... A Way of Life	"Tu Mera Hai"	A. R. Rahman	Nusrat Badr	Sukhwinder Singh, Naresh Iyer
2010	Lava Kusa: The Warrior Twins	"Ramayana Divya Katha"	L. Vaidyanathan		
2010	Lava Kusa: The Warrior Twins	"Shree Raghunadhki"	L. Vaidyanathan		
2010	The Film Emotional Atyachar	"Yaadon Ki"	Mangesh Dhakde		
2010	Twinkle Twinkle Little Star	"Mann Hai Mera"(Female)	Ilaiyaraaja	Dev Kohli	
2021	Marakkar: Lion of the Arabian Sea	"Nanhe kunjali"	Ronnie Raphael		
2022	Major	"Mere Laalna"	Sricharan Pakala	Ritesh Rajwada	
2023	The Kerala Story	"Tu Mila"	Viresh Sreevalsa	Ozhil Dalal	
2024	Thalapathy is the G. O. A. T.	"Chhoti Chhoti Aankhen"	Yuvan Shankar Raja	Raqueeb Alam	Javed Ali
2025	"Crazxy"	"Yun hi chale gaye"	Osho Jain	Osho Jain	
2025	Hai Junoon! Dream.. Dare.. Dominate.	Roop Suhana Lagta hain - Trap Mix	Anu Malik, Farooq Got Audio ( Remixed)	Indeevar	S. P. Balasubrahmanyam

== Non-film songs ==
Year	Album title	Song	Composer(s)	Writer(s)	Co-artist
1993	Ragga Raaga	"Gori Gori"	Salim–Sulaiman		Vodoo Rapper
1993	Ragga Raaga	"Kabhi Yahaan Kabhi Wahaan"	Salim–Sulaiman		Vodoo Rapper
1993	Ragga Raaga	"Kiss Me"	Salim–Sulaiman		Vodoo Rapper
1993	Ragga Raaga	"Senoritaa"	Salim–Sulaiman		Vodoo Rapper
1995	Dole Dole & Other Hits	"Sangeet"	Salim–Sulaiman		Solo
2000	Sunset Point	"Kachche Rang"	Vishal Bhardwaj		Gulzar
2000	Sunset Point	"Aa Chal Doobke"	Vishal Bhardwaj		Bhupinder Singh, Gulzar
2000	Sunset Point	"Aasmani Rang"	Vishal Bhardwaj		Bhupinder Singh, Gulzar
2000	Sunset Point	"Aarzoo Meri"	Vishal Bhardwaj		Bhupinder Singh, Gulzar
2000	Sunset Point	"Pakhiyan Ve Pakhiyan"	Vishal Bhardwaj		Bhupinder Singh, Gulzar
2000	Sunset Point	"Aa Chal"(Reprise)	Vishal Bhardwaj		
2000	Sunset Point	"Kachche Rang"(Repise)	Vishal Bhardwaj		
2000	Piya Basanti	"Piya Basanti"	Kishan Rajbhatt		Ustad Sulthan Khan
2000	Piya Basanti	"Surmayi Aankhen"	Kishan Rajbhatt		Ustad Sulthan Khan
2000	Piya Basanti	"Shaam Dhale"	Kishan Rajbhatt		Ustad Sulthan Khan
2000	Piya Basanti	"Chale Re"	Kishan Rajbhatt		Ustad Sulthan Khan
2000	Piya Basanti	"Sawan Rut Aayi"	Kishan Rajbhatt		Ustad Sulthan Khan
2000	Piya Basanti	"Rangeelo Rut"	Kishan Rajbhatt		Ustad Sulthan Khan
2006	Ustad & the Divas	"Haiye Re"	Sandesh Shandilya	Irshad Kamil	
2006	Ustad & the Divas	"Rangeelo Rut"	Sandesh Shandilya	Irshad Kamil	Ustad Sultan Khan
2007	Zindagi	"Pal Pal Bekal"	Alaap Dudul Saikia	Sunil Bhatia	Zubeen Garg
2007	Zindagi	"Sham Dhal Jaye"	Alaap Dudul Saikia	Ravi Basnet	Zubeen Garg
2008	Nightingale - Tribute to Lataji	"Raina Beeti Jaaye"			
2008	Nightingale - Tribute to Lataji	"Roz Shaam Aathi Thi"			
2008	Nightingale - Tribute to Lataji	"Tu Jahaan Jahaan"			
2008	Nightingale - Tribute to Lataji	"Teri Aakhon"			
2008	Nightingale - Tribute to Lataji	"Na Jane Kyun"			
2008	Nightingale - Tribute to Lataji	"Ab Toh Hai Tumse"			
2009	Kehna Maine Yaad Kiya Hai	"Kehna Maine Yaad Kiya Hai"			Afsar & Sajid
2009	Kehna Maine Yaad Kiya Hai	"Kyun Humare Khwab Mei"			Afsar & Sajid
2009	Kehna Maine Yaad Kiya Hai	"Bas Ek Baat Ka Humko Gila"			Afsar & Sajid
2009	Kehna Maine Yaad Kiya Hai	"Ho Sake Toh Mujhe Bhula Dena"			Afsar & Sajid
2009	Kehna Maine Yaad Kiya Hai	"Mere Aansooo Ponchhathe Hi"			Afsar & Sajid
2009	Kehna Maine Yaad Kiya Hai	"Kehna Maine Yaad Kiya Hai II"			Afsar & Sajid
2009	Kehna Maine Yaad Kiya Hai	"Tu Hawaaon Mei Bikhar"			Afsar & Sajid
2009	Kehna Maine Yaad Kiya Hai	"Hai Tamanna Ajeeb Rehne Do"			Afsar & Sajid
2009	Andaaz	"Dard Badhkar"			Ramesh Narayan
2009	Andaaz	"Apni Dhun"			Ramesh Narayan
2009	Andaaz	"Ilahi"			Ramesh Narayan
2009	Andaaz	"Duniya Jise"			Ramesh Narayan
2009	Andaaz	"Jab Kisi Se"			Ramesh Narayan
2009	Andaaz	"Hum Resh Ko"			Ramesh Narayan
2009	Andaaz	"Tu Apne"			Ramesh Narayan
2009	Andaaz	"Raat Bhi"			Ramesh Narayan
2009	Sadaa	"Phool Thumse"(Duet)	Vijay Karun		Hariharan
2009	Sadaa	"Phool Thumse"(Female)	Vijay Karun		
2012	Piya Basanti Again	"Piya Basanti in the Lounge"			Ustad Sulthan Khan
2012	Piya Basanti Again	"Sehra Sehra"			Ustad Sulthan Khan
2012	Piya Basanti Again	"Chand Hain"			Ustad Sulthan Khan
2012	Piya Basanti Again	"Kab Aaoge"			Ustad Sulthan Khan
2012	Piya Basanti Again	"Gori Tune"			Ustad Sulthan Khan
2012	Piya Basanti Again	"Dil Ka Tu"			Ustad Sulthan Khan
2014	A Lullaby Of Hope	"Chanda Re"			Varun Sunil
2014	Raunaq	"Sach Kahoon"	A. R. Rahman		A. R. Rahman
2017	Bholi Bano	"Bholi Bano OST (Rang Mein)"			Owais Masood
2018	Gohar-e-Nayab	"Gohar-e-Nayab OST (Neend Mein)"			Owais Masood
2019	Jai Hind Vandemataram	"Zee music for Independence Day"			Shivkumar Bilagrami
2020	Jayatu Jayatu Bharatam	"Jayatu Jayatu Bharatam"			Shankar Mahadevan
2021	The Song Of 7th International Day Of Yoga	Theme : Yoga for Wellness	Kailash Kher Composed & lyrics	Launched by Honorable Prime Minister of India Sh. Narendra Modi and PIB India	Sonu Nigam Shankar Mahadevan, Daler Mehndi, Shaan, Kailash Kher and various other international artists.
2021	Meri Pukaar Suno	"Ek Jahaan Ek Ummeed Ek Waada"	A. R. Rahman	Gulzar	Sadhana Sargam, Shreya Ghoshal, Alka Yagnik, Shashaa Tirupati, Armaan Malik, Asees Kaur
2023	Aarambh	Payo ji	Ricky Kej	Traditional - Meera Bhajan	Abby V
