= Kismat (2004 film) =

- Poster
- Directed by: Guddu Dhanoa
- Written by: Dilip Shukla (dialogues)
- Screenplay by: Robin Bhatt; Sutanu Gupta
- Produced by: Pravin Shah
- Starring: Bobby Deol; Priyanka Chopra; Kabir Bedi; Amit Behl
- Cinematography: Shripad Natu
- Edited by: A. Muthu
- Music by: Anand Raj Anand
- Production company: Time Magnetics Pvt Ltd
- Distributed by: Time Magnetics
- Release date: 20 February 2004
- Running time: 143 min
- Country: India
- Language: Hindi
- Budget: ₹8 crore
- Box office: ₹8.46 crore

Kismat (transl. Destiny) is a 2004 Indian Hindi-language action film directed by Guddu Dhanoa. A remake of the 2002 Bengali film Deva, it stars Bobby Deol and Priyanka Chopra in the lead roles. It also stars Kabir Bedi, Sanjay Narvekar, Smita Jaykar and Ashish Vidyarthi.

== Plot ==
Tony is a hitman for a gangster, Vikas Patil, who owes his allegiance to wealthy Raj Mallya. Raj Mallya has been involved in marketing spurious and outdated drugs and, as a result, is the subject of an investigation by the Food & Drugs Administration's inspector, Dr. Hargobind Gosai. Raj asks Vikas to take care of Hargobind through Tony, which Tony does, and in this manner, Raj is absolved of all wrongdoing. Then Tony meets with an attractive starlet named Sapna and falls head over heels in love with her. When Sapna tells him that she is engaged to be married to Dr. Ajay Saxena, he is heartbroken. Then a scandal breaks out, and Hargobind is implicated in the deaths of three children that were killed by Raj's spurious drugs. All the evidence points against Hargobind, and not a single lawyer is willing to take his case; his wife kills herself, and the marriage of his daughter has been canceled. Then Tony finds out that Hargobind is none other than Sapna's dad – and he has ruined the only chance he had for marrying the girl of his dreams.

== Cast ==
- Bobby Deol as Tony
- Priyanka Chopra as Sapna Gosai
- Kabir Bedi as Raj Mallya
- Sanjay Narvekar as Goli (Toni's Friend)
- Mohan Joshi as Dr. Hargobind Gosai
- Amit Behl as Dr Ajay Saxena, Sapna's fiancé
- Shahbaz Khan as Raj Mallya's son
- Imran Khan as Vijay Sharma, elder son of Raj Mallya
- Smita Jaykar as Mrs. Sangeeta Gosai
- Ashish Vidyarthi as Vikas Patil
- Mushtaq Khan as Pankaj Bhai (Sapna's secretary)
- Veerendra Saxena as Sinha (Mallya's secretary)

== Soundtrack ==
The music was composed by Anand Raj Anand and the lyrics were penned by Dev Kohli. There are nine tracks in the album, including three instrumentals.

No.	Title	Performer(s)	Length
1.	"Mahi Mahi Mahi"	Sunidhi Chauhan
2.	"Sajna Se Milne Jaana"	Sunidhi Chauhan
3.	"Dil Teri Deewangi Mein"	Anand Raj Anand, Richa Sharma
4.	"Chitti Dudh Kudi"	Shaan, Gayatri Iyer
5.	"Hum Hain Mast Maula"	Abhijeet Bhattacharya, Alka Yagnik
6.	"Bicchi Padi Hai"	Anand Raj Anand
7.	"Mahi Mahi Mahi"	Instrumental
8.	"Sajna Se Milna Jaana"	Instrumental
9.	"Dil Teri Deewangi Mein"	Instrumental

== Critical reception ==
Taran Adarsh of IndiaFM gave the film 1.5 stars out of 5, writing, ″On the whole, KISMAT is a predictable fare that holds appeal for front-benchers mainly. For the gentry and the multiplex audiences, it has precious little to offer. However, its reasonable price should prove advantageous for its distributors.″ Sukanya Verma of Rediff.com gave a negative review writing ″All of Dhanoa's action flicks—like Ziddi and Salaakhen—are consistent: they all reek of clichés. They defy logic too. There is nothing wrong in being illogical as long as it is unapologetic. Dhanoa's Ziddi clicked despite being unbelievably implausible because Sunny Deol could carry it off. But in Kismat, Bobby Deol is unable to do a bade bhaiya (big brother). Anupama Chopra of India Today wrote, ″Needless to say, nobody rises above the film. Deol and Chopra look dazed and confused. The villains are fit for Cartoon Network and the endless item numbers, pure tedium. Unlike Rudraksh, Kismet isn't even unintentional comedy. Skip it.″ Manish Gajjar of BBC.com wrote, ″On the whole, Kismat has very little to offer in terms of content. Its [sic] pure entertainment Bollywood style. What Kismat (meaning fate!) awaits this film at the UK box office? Your guess is good as mine.″
