= Dharma (1998 film) =

- Theatrical release poster
- Directed by: Keyaar
- Written by: Prasannakumar (dialogues)
- Screenplay by: Keyaar
- Story by: Robin Henry
- Based on: Ziddi (1997) by Guddu Dhanoa
- Produced by: A. S. Ibrahim Rowther (presenter); A. Abbas Rowther
- Starring: Vijayakanth; Preetha Vijayakumar
- Cinematography: Rajarajan
- Edited by: R. T. Annadurai
- Music by: Ilaiyaraaja
- Production company: Rowther Films
- Release date: 9 July 1998
- Running time: 160 minutes
- Country: India
- Language: Tamil

Dharma (transl. Righteousness) is a 1998 Indian Tamil-language action drama film directed by Keyaar. The film stars Vijayakanth and Preetha Vijayakumar. A remake of the 1997 Hindi film Ziddi, it was released on 9 July 1998.

== Plot ==
Dharma (Vijayakanth) is an angry man who cannot tolerate injustice. He lives with his lawyer father Ranganathan (Jaishankar), mother Savithri (Vadivukkarasi), journalist brother Vijay (Thalaivasal Vijay), and beloved sister Geetha (Shilpa). Dharma and Sharmila (Preetha Vijayakumar) fall in love with each other. One day, Geetha is molested by the rowdy Raja, and Dharma kills Raja in public; thus, he is sent to jail. In the meantime, Dharma's friend Ranjith (Ranjith) becomes an ACP.

Upon his release from jail, Dharma becomes a powerful gangster who punishes rowdies in his own way and helps the poor. The honest chief minister Vedhachalam (S. S. Rajendran) then gives free hand to arrest all the goons including Dharma. Geetha then marries Ranjith.

The drug smuggler Daas (Mansoor Ali Khan), the notorious killer Khan (Ponnambalam), and the land grabber Amarnath (Kazan Khan) work under a corrupted politician Chakravarthy (Vinu Chakravarthy). They decide to kill Vedhachalam, but Vijay has listened to their plan and immediately informs Ranjith. Surprisingly, Ranjith kills Vijay from behind. In fact, Ranjith is Raja's brother and wants to take revenge on Dharma.

Later, Vedhachalam is severely injured by the rowdies, but Dharma saves him and hides him in a secured place. Meanwhile, Geetha finds out that Vijay was killed by Ranjith, and Ranjith also kills her.

The police department seeks Dharma for kidnapping Vedhachalam. What transpires later forms the crux of the story.

== Cast ==
- Vijayakanth as Dharma
- Preetha Vijayakumar as Sharmila Pavithrambalam
- Chippy as Geetha
- Jaishankar as Lawyer Ranganathan
- Ranjith as Ranjith
- Vinu Chakravarthy as Chakravarthy
- Thalaivasal Vijay as Vijay
- Vadivukkarasi as Savithri
- Manorama as Fathima
- S. S. Rajendran as Chief Minister Vedhachalam
- Mansoor Ali Khan as Daas
- Ponnambalam as Khan
- Kazan Khan as Amarnath
- Ashwini as Anandhi
- LIC Narasimhan
- Singamuthu
- Rajasekhar
- Master Aravind
- Baby Aarthi

== Production ==
Since the climax of the original Hindi film took 90 days to shoot, Keyaar decided to reuse the bomb blast scenes from that film in the Tamil version, replacing Sunny Deol's portions with Vijayakanth thereby shooting the climax in three days.

== Soundtrack ==
The music was composed by Ilaiyaraaja.

Song	Singer(s)	Lyrics	Duration
"Dharmangal"	S. P. Balasubrahmanyam	Vaasan	5:00
"Iru Kanngal" (Happy)	Ilaiyaraaja	Vaasan	1:09
"Iru Kanngal" (Sad)	Ilaiyaraaja	Vaasan	1:06
"Iru Kanngal" (Happy)	S. P. Balasubrahmanyam	Vaasan	5:04
"Iru Kanngal" (Sad)	S. P. Balasubrahmanyam	Vaasan	5:00
"Manakkum"	S. P. Balasubrahmanyam, Sujatha	Pulamaipithan	5:01
"Sembaruthi"	S. P. Balasubrahmanyam, Swarnalatha	Pulamaipithan	5:02
"Thinam"	S. P. Balasubrahmanyam	Vaasan	1:19

== Critical reception ==
Ji of Kalki gave a negative review, saying that despite suiting Vijayakanth's image, the film lacks freshness. D. S. Ramanujam of The Hindu wrote, "Vijayakanth plays the part with his known ease and vigour. His zeal for action has not diminished. Preetha is no match for him and is more of a showpiece".
