= Imran Khan (TV actor) =

Indian actor

Imran Khan is an Indian actor, director, writer and a producer in Bollywood films, television films, soap operas and commercials.

== Early life ==
Khan was born in Mumbai. Khan graduated from Mithibai College with a degree in commerce. He has been working in the film and television industry for 25 years.

== Career ==
=== Film ===
Khan's first film as an actor was 1991's Inteha Pyar Ki starring Rishi Kapoor and Ruksar. He then worked in movies such as Sangam Hoke Rahega in 1994, Karamveer, Mohabbaton ka Safar in 1995, Kismat, Big Brother, Heroine, Sooryavansham, Khiladiyon Ka Khiladi, Hawa, Dil Toh Baccha Hai Ji and 23rd March 1931: Shaheed.

=== Television ===
His first appearance in a TV series was Tara. This was followed by Dastaan, Parampara, Ajnabi, Nagin, Chandni, Aashirwad, Astitwa, Ammaji Ki Gali, Jiny and Jeeju, and I Love My India.

Imran Khan Productions has produced television films and TV serials such as Haya for Ary digital, and Nakhuda for Zee.

== Filmography ==
=== Films ===
Feature films

- Inteha Pyar Ki (1992)
- Karamveer (1993)
- Sangam Ho Ke Rahega (1994)
- Mohabbaton Kaa Safar (1995)
- Khiladiyon Ka Khiladi Popo (1996)
- Sooryavansham (1999)
- 23rd March 1931: Shaheed (2002)
- Hawa (2003)
- Kismat (2004)
- Bhola in Bollywood (2004)
- Big Brother (2007)
- Dil Toh Bachcha Hai Ji (2011)
- Heroine (2012)

== Television ==
Year	Serial	Role	Notes
2023–2025	Kumkum Bhagya	Harman Malhotra	
2025–present	Jagadhatri	Mahesh Deshmukh	

- Vishwaas as Inspector Siddhanth
- Humse Hai Liife as Principal Shenoy (2011)
- Tara (1993) as Popo
- Hero Uncle (1994)
- Dastaan (Zee TV) (1995-1996)
- Ajnabi (1996)
- Naagin (1999) as Rahul
- Devrani Jethani(1997)
- Lakeerein (Zee Tv)
- Neeyat (Zee Tv)
- Sssshhh...Phir Koi Hai as Krishna (Jai Shree Krishna)
- Dharti Ka Veer Yodha Prithviraj Chauhan as Alha
- Nargis (DD national)
- Hamari Bahu Tulsi as Aavishkar
- Arjun (Star Plus)
- Ek Hazaaron Mein Meri Behna Hai
- Savdhaan India (2012) as Ramji (Episode 2209)
- Beintehaa (2014) as Rahim Chacha
- Beyhadh (2016)
- SuperCops Vs SuperVillains as Rajan Gupta (2013) / Dr Manav (2015)
- Ishq Ki Dastaan - Naagmani as Durjan Singh (2022)
