= Ek Hindustani =

- Directed by: Tinnu Anand
- Written by: Santosh Saroj
- Produced by: Amar Sharma
- Starring: Suniel Shetty; Raveena Tandon
- Cinematography: Basheer Ali
- Music by: Anand Raj Anand
- Production company: Vivek Arts
- Release date: 1 October 2003
- Country: India
- Language: Hindi

Ek Hindustani is a 2003 Indian action film. The film was directed by Tinnu Anand. It starred Suniel Shetty and Raveena Tandon in lead roles.

== Plot ==
Sunil Shrivastava (Suniel Shetty), is the son of a freedom fighter (Pran), who fought against the British regime for Indian independence. His father knew what slavery meant and also made him understand the same. He believed that, "It was better to die than to live as coward". With such intention Sunil comes to bombay from Allahabad to study law, so that he can fight for the justice of the people. But he soon realizes that the law in the city favours the powerful people and the weaker section of the society are the losers. Not being a coward, Sunil decides to take on the system, be it all-alone, and fight them on his own terms. A saviour called "Ek Hindustani" is born which is the name given by the people to Sunil. Suddenly there is revolution in the air. Every child around wants to become "Ek Hindustani" and wants to live without fear. Sunil's dream will come true when every person in the country will stand up and fight against evil, than live life of a coward.

== Cast ==
- Suniel Shetty as Sunil Shrivastav
- Raveena Tandon as Nisha
- Pran as Mr Shrivastav
- Mohan Joshi as Insp Kulkani
- Mohnish Bahl as Vikram
- Ashish Vidyarthi as Salim
- Kulbhushan Kharbanda as Judge Acharya
- Himani Shivpuri as Razia
- Rakhee Malhotra as Anisha
- Rajendra Gupta as Zaheer
- Harish Patel as Ibu
- Mushtaq Khan as Parvez
- Shahbaz Khan as Deb
- Brij Gopal as Bhushan
- Veerendra Saxena as Bhagwat Choudhary

== Soundtrack ==
Ek Hindustani

Soundtrack album by Anand Raj Anand Daboo Malik
- Released: 17 August 2002
- Label: T-Series

1. "Mohabbat ko Hum Chhod De" - Udit Narayan, Alka Yagnik
2. "Aao Mujhe Acche LAgne Lage" - Udit Narayan, Anuradha Paudwal
3. "Aap Mujhe Acche Lagne Lage (sad)" - Sonu Nigam, Anuradha Paudwal
4. "Dilruba" - Udit Narayan
5. "Chori Chori Dil Diya" - Udit Narayan, Alka Yagnik
6. "Chalo Accha" - Udit Narayan, Kavita Krishnamurthy
7. "Sonewale Neend Se Jage" - Alka Yagnik, Anand Raj Anand, Sonu Nigam
8. "Yeh Fauji" - Anand Raj Anand
9. "Yaaron Ka Dil Todke" - Ram Shankar
