= Surinder Sodhi =

Indian film score composer

Surender Sodhi (often credited as Surendra Sodhi) is an Indian film score composer. He has composed background scores for notable Hindi films such as Deewana, Soldier, Raja Hindustani, Baadshah, Hera Pheri, 23rd March 1931: Shaheed and Special 26.

== Partial filmography as Background Score Composer ==
Year	Film	Language	Notes
1992	Deewana	Hindi	
1995	Gaddaar	Hindi	
1995	Coolie No.1	Hindi	
1995	Gundaraj	Hindi	
1996	Vijeta	Hindi	Credited as Surender Singh
1996	Mr. Bechara	Hindi	
1996	Raja Hindustani	Hindi	
1997	Ziddi	Hindi	
1997	Ishq	Hindi	
1997	Aflatoon	Hindi	
1997	Mohabbat	Hindi	
1998	Bhai Bhai	Hindi	
1998	Badmaash	Hindi	
1998	Pyaar To Hona Hi Tha	Hindi	
1998	Bandhan	Hindi	
1998	Soldier	Hindi	
1999	Aarzoo	Hindi	
1999	Baadshah	Hindi	
2000	Mela	Hindi	
2000	Hera Pheri	Hindi	
2000	Dulhan Hum Le Jayenge	Hindi	
2000	Papa the Great	Hindi	
2000	Hadh Kar Di Aapne	Hindi	
2000	Hum To Mohabbat Karega	Hindi	
2000	Har Dil Jo Pyar Karega	Hindi	
2000	Dhadkan	Hindi	
2000	Karobaar: The Business of Love	Hindi	
2001	Bhairav	Hindi	
2001	Ajnabee	Hindi	
2002	Haan Maine Bhi Pyaar Kiya	Hindi	
2002	Kranti	Hindi	
2002	Tum Se Achcha Kaun Hai	Hindi	
2002	23rd March 1931: Shaheed	Hindi	
2002	Dil Hai Tumhaara	Hindi	
2003	Nayee Padosan	Hindi	
2003	Hawa	Hindi	
2003	Dil Pardesi Ho Gayaa	Hindi	
2004	Ab Tumhare Hawale Watan Saathiyo	Hindi	
2004	Tum – A Dangerous Obsession	Hindi	
2004	Taarzan: The Wonder Car	Hindi	
2004	Colour Blossoms	Cantonese	Hong Kong film.
2004	Hulchul	Hindi	
2005	Bachke Rehna Re Baba	Hindi	
2007	Undertrial	Hindi	
2008	Shaurya	Hindi	
2008	Pranali: The Tradition	Hindi	
2008	Hashar : A Love Story	Punjabi	
2009	Lottery	Hindi	
2009	Do Knot Disturb	Hindi	
2010	Hello! Hum Lallan Bol Rahe Hain	Hindi	
2011	I Am Singh	Hindi	
2013	Special 26	Hindi	
2016	Rustom	Hindi	
2017	Toilet - Ek Prem Katha	Hindi	
