= Mar Mitenge =

- Theatrical release poster
- Directed by: Kawal Sharma
- Written by: Javed Siddique
- Produced by: Pradeep Sharma
- Starring: Jeetendra; Mithun Chakraborty; Madhavi; Bhanupriya
- Cinematography: V. Durga Prasad
- Edited by: Muthar Ahmed
- Music by: Laxmikant–Pyarelal
- Production company: TUTU Films
- Release date: 15 October 1988
- Running time: 140 minutes
- Country: India
- Language: Hindi

Mar Mitenge (transl. Bear The Death) is a 1988 Hindi-language action film, produced by Pradeep Sharma under the TUTU Films banner and directed by Kawal Sharma. It stars Jeetendra, Mithun Chakraborty, Madhavi, and Bhanupriya in the pivotal roles with music composed by Laxmikant–Pyarelal.

== Cast ==
- Jeetendra as Ram
- Mithun Chakraborty as Laxman
- Madhavi as Radha
- Bhanupriya as Jenny
- Amrish Puri as Ajit Singh
- Shakti Kapoor as Manjit Singh
- Asrani as Jalaluddin Mohammed Akbar
- Vinod Mehra as Police Inspector Thakur
- Kader Khan as Pasha
- Satyendra Kapoor as Master Shrikant Verma
- Jayshree Gadkar as Shanti Shrikant Verma
- Chand Usmani as Ranjana, Akbar's grandmother
- Yunus Parvez as The Groom Saxena
- Tiku Talsania as Police Inspector G.B. Parab
- Viju Khote as Constable P.K. Kale
- Manik Irani as Manglu Dada
- Gurbachan Singh as Darshan
- Bob Christo as Bob
- Mac Mohan as Prakash
- Sudhir as Jaichand, Ajit Singh's Henchman
- Pradeep Rawat as Shekhar, Ajit Singh's Henchman
- Moolchand as Jeweller

== Soundtrack ==
Lyrics: Anand Bakshi

#	Title	Singer(s)
1	"Dekho Mera Janaza"	Kishore Kumar, Anuradha Paudwal
2	"Badon Ka Hai Farmana"	Mohammed Aziz, Shailender Singh, Anuradha Paudwal, Kavita Krishnamurthy
3	"Haye Mere Rabba"	Anupama Deshpande
4	"Ram Ne Kahi"	Mohammed Aziz, Shailender Singh
5	"Mar Mitenge"	Mohammed Aziz, Shailender Singh, Anuradha Paudwal, Alka Yagnik
6	"Aale Re Aale"	Shailender Singh, Shabbir Kumar, Kavita Krishnamurthy, Anuradha Paudwal
