= Bichhoo =

- Poster
- Directed by: Guddu Dhanoa
- Screenplay by: Dilip Shukla
- Story by: Santosh Dhanoa
- Produced by: Guddu Dhanoa
- Starring: Bobby Deol; Rani Mukherjee; Ashish Vidyarthi; Malaika Arora
- Cinematography: Shripad Natu
- Edited by: V. N. Mayekar
- Music by: Anand Raaj Anand
- Production company: Bhagwan Chitra Mandir
- Distributed by: Video Sound Inc.
- Release date: 7 July 2000
- Running time: 162 minutes
- Country: India
- Language: Hindi
- Budget: ₹7.50 crore
- Box office: ₹19.75 crore

Bichhoo (transl. Scorpion) is a 2000 Indian Hindi-language action thriller film directed by Guddu Dhanoa, starring Bobby Deol and Rani Mukerji. It is a remake of the 1994 French English-language film Léon: The Professional by Luc Besson with the age of the lead actress changed from 12 to 22 years.

== Synopsis ==
Jeeva (Bobby Deol) is from a struggling family. He falls in love with Kiran (Malaika Arora Khan). Due to their differences in social class, Kiran's father does not approve of their relationship. To punish Jeeva, Kiran's father frames his mother (Farida Jalal) and two sisters for prostitution and bribes the police into arresting them, which leads to the three of them committing suicide. Kiran also kills herself, ashamed of what her father has done. Jeeva seeks revenge by killing Kiran's father.

He is a professional killer, residing in Mumbai who kills anybody for a price, other than women and children. He lives in an apartment next to the Bali family. Their youngest daughter, also named Kiran strongly dislikes them and tries many a time to befriend Jeeva, who is too engrossed in his killings to have any time for her. Kiran Bali's father has been supplying drugs for a corrupt police officer named Devraj Khatri. Khatri learns that Bali has been hiding drugs from him and so, in retaliation he leads his men to kill the entire family. Kiran is the only one to survive as she was delivering milk to Jeeva in his apartment.

Jeeva empathises with Kiran, mostly due to his own tragic past which involved losing loved ones. Kiran soon enough learns that Jeeva is a professional killer and despite the latter's initial objections, learns how to handle weapons to avenge the death of her family. Meanwhile, Khatri and his men learn that there is a sole survivor of their brutal murder of the Bali family, and so decide to hunt down and kill Kiran. So, Jeeva must stop at nothing to protect Kiran from Khatri.

== Cast ==
- Bobby Deol as Jeeva Khandelwal
- Rani Mukerji as Kiran Bali
- Malaika Arora as Kiran Sabarwal
- Farida Jalal as Neha Khandelwal, Jeeva's mother.
- Ashish Vidyarthi as Corrupt Assistant Commissioner of Police Devraj Khatri (in Narcotics Department)
- Sachin Khedekar as Vijay Bali, Kiran Bali's brother.
- Suresh Chatwal as Shopkeeper
- Veerendra Saxena as Madan Bhai, Jeeva's friend.
- Pramod Moutho as Pankaj Kharbanda
- Mohan Joshi as Kiran 's father
- Avtar Gill as S.K. Puri, Police Commissioner
- Mahavir Shah as Inspector Zaid Khan
- Bhakti Barve as TV interviewer, who takes an interview of the Police Commissioner
- Ishrat Ali as Vikas Bali, Kiran Bali's father.
- Dolly Bindra as Mrs Bali, Kiran Bali's stepmother.
- Shweta Shetty in a guest role (in the song "Dil Tote Tote Ho Gaya")
- Hans Raj Hans as himself
- Janardhan Parab as Security Guard of society
- Santosh Gupta as Mumbai Local Train passenger

== Soundtrack ==
Bichhoo

Soundtrack album by Anand Raaj Anand
- Released: 2000
- Genre: Feature film soundtrack
- Label: T-Series

All songs written composed by Anand Raaj Anand and lyrics written by Sameer. The album consists of 8 songs, including two instrumental tracks. Harry Anand, brother of the music director Anand Raj Anand and one of the first musicians to start the trend of bringing out remix music videos in India, composed and sang two songs from the tracks. According to the Indian trade website Box Office India, with around 16,00,000 units sold, this film's soundtrack album was the year's eleventh highest-selling.

=== Track listing ===
| # | Title | Singer(s) | Length |
|---|---|---|---|
| 1 | "Pyar Tu Dil Tu" | Alka Yagnik, Vinod Rathod | 5:39 |
| 2 | "Dil Tote Tote Ho Gaya" | Hans Raj Hans, Shweta Shetty | 5:38 |
| 3 | "Jeevan Mein Jaane Jaana" | Harry Anand, Jaspinder Narula | 5:15 |
| 4 | "Tere Hothon Ki Hansi" (Deleted song) | Hariharan, Swarnalatha | 4:26 |
| 5 | "Pyar Ho Na Jaye" | Shankar Mahadevan, Ram Shankar, Raj Bhatt | 6:39 |
| 6 | "Ekwari Tak Le" | Harry Anand, Sunidhi Chauhan | 5:25 |
| 7 | "Jeevan Mein Jaane Jaana (Instrumental)" | — | 5:14 |
| 8 | "Dil Tote Tote Ho Gaya (Instrumental)" | — | 5:37 |

== Sequel ==
In 2014, director Guddu Dhanoa has announced that he would make a sequel, Bichhoo 2, with Bobby Deol in the central role. The production of the film is in its preliminary phase; selection of the lead actress is to be done, among other pivotal tasks. In retrospect of the success of Bichhoo, Dhanoa has said that the new venture is special for him. Though he was tentative about a cut and dry date of release, he said the film will be hitting the screens in the near future.
