= Wajahh: A Reason to Kill =

- Theatrical release poster
- Directed by: Gautam Adhikari
- Written by: Ghalib Asadbhopal; Sandeep Patel
- Story by: Tony Mirrcandani
- Produced by: Markand Adhikari; Anand Pandit
- Starring: Arbaaz Khan; Gracy Singh; Shamita Shetty; Zulfi Syed; Sudesh Berry; Satish Kaushik; Vijayendra Ghatge
- Cinematography: S.R.K. Murthy
- Music by: Anand Raj Anand
- Release date: 8 October 2004
- Country: India
- Language: Hindi

Wajahh: A Reason to Kill is a 2004 Indian Hindi-language thriller film directed by Gautam Adhikari, starring Arbaaz Khan, Gracy Singh, Shamita Shetty, Zulfi Syed, and Sudesh Berry in lead roles. It is co-produced by Markand Adhikari and Anand Pandit.

== Cast ==
- Arbaaz Khan as Dr. Aditya Bhargava
- Gracy Singh as Trishna Bhargava, Dr. Aditya's wife
- Shamita Shetty as Ishita Singhania, Dr. Aditya's love interest
- Zulfi Syed as Raj
- Sudesh Berry as Sameer
- Satish Kaushik as Inspector Bholenath
- Vijayendra Ghatge as Rakesh Singhania, Ishita's father
- Zahid Ali
- Aarti Nagpal as Sonia
- Firdaus Mevawala as Doctor Taneja

== Soundtrack ==
Wajahh: A Reason to Kill

Soundtrack album by Anand Raj Anand
- Released: 1 January 2004
- Recorded: 1003-2004
- Genre: Feature film soundtrack
- Length: 28:36
- Language: Hindi
- Label: Anand Raj Anand
External audio
- Video on YouTube

The music for the film is composed by Anand Raj Anand.

No.	Title	Music	Singer(s)	Length
1.	"Agar Zindagi Se" (Hindi)	Anand Raj Anand	Daler Mehndi	04:18
2.	"Wada Yeh Kar Sathiya" (Hindi)	Anand Raj Anand	Shreya Ghosal, Anand Raj Anand	04:16
3.	"Yeh Zamana" (Hindi)	Anand Raj Anand	Sunidhi Chauhan, Bob	03:33
4.	"Teri Dee Ko Akhiya Tarse" (Hindi)	Anand Raj Anand	Anand Raj Anand	05:17
5.	"Sapna Koi" (Hindi)	Anand Raj Anand	Shreya Ghosal	04:52
6.	"Koi Na Koi Wajah Toh Hogi" (Hindi)	Anand Raj Anand	Kunal Ganjawala	03:40
Total length:				28:36
