= Kawal Sharma =

Indian film director and producer

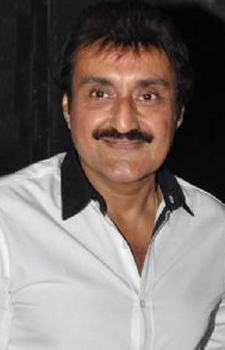
- Born: 3 July 1959 (age 66)
- Citizenship: India
- Occupations: Film director, producer

Kawal Sharma is an Indian film director and producer who works in Hindi films.

== Filmography ==
- Paap Ki Kamaee (1990) (as director)
- Jeete Hain Shaan Se (1987) (as director)
- Mar Mitenge (1988) (as director)
- Maalamaal (1988) (as director and editor)
- Ustaad (1989) (as director)
- Gunahon Ka Devta (1990) (as director)
- Namak (1996) (as director and producer)
- Heeralal Pannalal (1999) (as director)
