= Rajesh Khera =

Indian television actor and voice actor (born 1968)

- Born: 26 October 1968 (age 57); Pune, Maharashtra, India
- Occupations: Actor; Voice Actor
- Years active: 1995–present

Rajesh Khera (Rājēśa Khērā) is an Indian television actor and voice actor who has acted in many Hindi films and is remembered for the role of fashion designer Maddy in Jassi Jaissi Koi Nahin. He was also a contender in a TV reality show Survivor (2011) which aired on Star Plus.

He played the role of Acharya Devvrat in the TV serial Chakravartin Ashoka Samrat.

== Filmography ==
=== Films ===
- Hazaar Chaurasi (from Kashmir)
- Hazaar Chaurasi Ki Maa (1998)
- Hu Tu Tu (1999)
- Taal (1999) as Brij Mohan Mehta
- Josh (2000) as Matwyn
- Tum Bin (2001) as Shekhar's Friend 'Bosco'
- 23rd March 1931: Shaheed (2002) as Sardar Ajit Singh
- Om Jai Jagadish (2002) as Fake Audio CD manufacturer
- Jaal: The Trap (2003) as Journalist Alok Dass (Ajay's Friend)
- Samay (2003) as Postmortem Doctor
- Naach (2004) as Director
- Karam (2005) as Bull
- Tango Charlie (2005) as BSF soldier Sangraam Singh
- The Train (2007)
- Chain Kulii Ki Main Kulii (2007) as John Kakkad (Hitler)
- Victoria No. 203 (2007) as Karan
- Speed (2007) as Taxi Driver
- Kambakkht Ishq (2009) as Dr. Ali
- Aagey Se Right (2009) as T.V. Vinod
- Lamhaa (2010) as Parvez
- Mallika (2010)as Chandar
- The Whisperers
- 42 km as Ramesh
- Yeh Dooriyan (2011) as Vishal
- U R My Jaan (2011)
- Hate Story 2 (2014) as Atul Mhatre
- Ek Kahani Julie Ki (2016)
- Satyameva Jayate (2018) as Police Inspector Satish Bhonsale
- Thackeray (film) (2019) as Morarji Desai
- Gadar 2 (2023) as Col. Nazeer
- Swatantrya Veer Savarkar (2024) as MK Gandhi
- The Bengal Files (2025) as Muhammad Ali Jinnah
- Ek Deewane Ki Deewaniyat (2025) as Raheja

=== Television ===
Year	Show	Role	Notes	Ref(s)
1993-97	Tara (TV series)	Gautam	Debut Show	
1995	Swabhimaan	Ranjit	Supporting Role	
1998	Saaya (Indian TV series)	Ranveer Rastogi		
1998-2000	Aahat	Rajan/Amit/ Jai/Ravi	Episodic Role	
1999-2002	C.I.D. (Indian TV series)	Jagdish/Mangal/ Dushyant/Badshah; Johnny/Kedar (Note: He appeared in eight episodes in three distinct roles.)	Episodic Role	
2003-07	Jassi Jaissi Koi Nahin	Maddy	Supporting Role	
2005-07	C.I.D. (Indian TV series)	Nandan Kumar/Jaan/Vishwajeet (Note: Rajesh appeared in three distinct roles in five episodes.)	Episodic Role	
2006-08	Left Right Left (TV series)	Major Bhargav	Negative Role	
2008	Mumbai Calling		Supporting Role	
2009	Bhaskar Bharti	KK(Krishan Kanhaiya)	Supporting Role	
2012	Survivor India (season 1)	Contestant	Reality Show	
2012	Aasman Se Aage	Sanam	Supporting Role	
2014	Uttaran	Maharani	Cameo	
2014-15	Maharakshak: Aryan	Senapati Karakasur	Negative Role	
2015	Sense8	Wedding Planner	International TV series	
2015	Chakravartin Ashoka Samrat	Acharya Devavrath	Supporting Role	
2016	Baal Veer	Gurudev	Antagonist	
2016 – present	24 (Indian TV series season 2)	Colonel Sudeep	Cameo	
2016	Naagarjuna - Ek Yoddha	Takshaka	Supporting Role	
2017	Ghulam	Ardhanareshwar Maharaj	Special Appearance	
2017	Tenali Rama (TV series)	Sultan Samshudin Jafar Khan	Cameo	
2017	Dev (TV series)	Arastu Sahay		

2024 SARDAR THE GAME CHANGER (TV series)

=== Web series ===
Year	Title	Role	Platform	Notes
2019	Ishq Aaj Kal	Javed	ZEE5	Negative Role
2019	The Verdict – State vs Nanavati	Inspector John Lobo	ALTBalaji and ZEE5	
2020	The Casino	Deshmukh	ZEE5	
2025	Criminal Justice: A Family Matter	Solkar	JioHotstar	
2025	Saare Jahan Se Accha: The Silent Guardians	Bilal Jahangir Baweja	Netflix	

== Dubbing career ==
Rajesh has also been dubbing for foreign films into the Hindi language as well, in addition to acting, while working as a production trainee.

== Dubbing roles ==
=== Live action films ===
Film title	Actor	Character	Dub Language	Original Language	Original Year release	Dub Year release	Notes
Predators	Adrien Brody	Royce	Hindi	English	2010	2010	

== Notes ==
c. He has a niece whose name is Anika Lakhanpal
