= Hawa (2003 film) =

- Poster
- Directed by: Guddu Dhanoa
- Written by: Sutanu Gupta; Sanjay Masoom
- Produced by: Guddu Dhanoa; Santosh Dhanoa
- Starring: Tabu; Shahbaz Khan; Mukesh Tiwari; Hansika
- Cinematography: Sripad Natu
- Edited by: A. Muthu
- Music by: Dilip Sen-Sameer Sen; Surendra Singh Sodhi
- Release date: 4 July 2003
- Running time: 128 min
- Country: India
- Language: Hindi
- Budget: ₹3 crore
- Box office: ₹5.89 crore

Hawa (transl. Wind) is a 2003 Indian Hindi-language supernatural horror film directed by Guddu Dhanoa. Starring Tabu, it is an unofficial remake of the 1983 American film The Entity, and was filmed in Manali, a location selected by Dhanoa after his car broke down over a narrow bridge during the shoot of Jaal: The Trap (also featuring Tabu), and prompted him to make a horror film situated there. Tabu signed on for the lead role of a mother with two children holed up in a haunted house, as she wanted to understand what ghosts and the supernatural were all about. It also marked Hansika Motwani's on-screen debut as a child actor.

Hawa was released on 4 July 2003. It was later dubbed into Telugu as Naa Intlo Oka Roju and in Tamil as Raja Leelai.

== Plot ==
The beautiful Sanjana is a divorcee who moves to a hillside house, as she cannot afford a house in the city. To earn her living, she runs her stepfather's antique shop. However, it is not long before strange occurrences begin near and in her home. One day, a Tibetan old lady gives her an antique locket at her antique shop and leaves. Sanjana sells it to a tourist couple for 500 rupees. Sanjana finds the lady on the way to her home to return the money, but she discovers that the lady was dead. The locket is returned to Sanjana by the tourist as the Tibetan lady keeps haunting the couple to make them return it.

Later, Sanjana is tortured and physically raped multiple times by an invisible demon, first in her room, then in the shower, and then in front of her own kids. Her dog becomes possessed soon after and attacks her and Vicky, her younger brother. Sanjana consults a psychiatrist who doesn't believe her, despite telling him multiple times. Soon, the invisible demon has sex with Sanjana, for which she gets an orgasm but soon regrets having sex with an invisible being. After a while, the demon takes away her younger daughter from Sanjana. She calls her psychiatric friend, and he brings a parapsychologist. Sanjana comes to learn that the demon comes from an old well, where the tribals used to push down and kill criminals as punishment. Due to lightning striking the well, one soul who was a rapist was thrown in the well and killed; he has now escaped, and he fell for Sanjana. The parapsychologist opens the well from which all the evil spirits come out and attacks him.

Sanjana jumps into the well to bring back her daughter. There all the spirits get combined into a huge demon. Sanjana throws the Tibetan locket to hit the demon, which then dissolves. The soul of Sanjana's father comes as an angel and returns her younger daughter.

Sanjana prepares to leave her house, and suddenly the door closes. A demonic voice calls her, and she opens the door but finds nothing. Before leaving, her younger daughter suddenly runs to the house, and the door closes.

== Cast ==
- Tabu as Sanjana
- Shahbaz Khan as Dr. Asif Ali
- Mukesh Tiwari as Psychiatrist-exorcist (Tantrik)
- Imran Khan as Vicky, Sanjana's brother
- Grusha Kapoor as Pooja (as Grusha Grover)
- Vishwajeet Pradhan as Pooja's husband
- Amit Behl as Vijay, Sanjana's husband
- Avtar Gill as Sanjana's father/ Angel
- Hansika Motwani as Sasha, Sanjana's elder daughter
- Hansika Motwani as Misha, Sanjana's younger daughter
- Suresh Chatwal as Real Estate Agent

== Critical reception ==
Taran Adarsh of Bollywood Hungama gave the film 2.5 stars and claimed that "the film merges two lethal aspects, sex and violence, which should prove a path-breaking exercise for the Hindi viewer." Suraj Das of Planet Bollywood, gave the film 2 stars out of 5 and said that 'Self-respecting moviegoers looking for quality film rather than shameful sexual exploitation should steer far clear of this compost.' Anjum N from Rediff, gave the film a negative review and said that "Tabu is the only saving grace of the movie'", and "it's rather sad that all her effort has been wasted in a movie like Hawa."
