= Pardesi Babu =

- Directed by: Manoj Agrawal
- Written by: Aadesh K. Arjun (dialogues)
- Story by: Satish Jain
- Produced by: Kulbhushan Gupta
- Starring: Govinda; Raveena Tandon; Shilpa Shetty
- Cinematography: Rajan Kinagi
- Edited by: R. Rajendran
- Music by: Anand Raj Anand
- Distributed by: K. B. Pictures
- Release date: 13 November 1998
- Running time: 161 mins
- Country: India
- Language: Hindi
- Budget: ₹5.50 crore
- Box office: ₹9.44 crore

Pardesi Babu is a 1998 Indian Hindi-language comedy drama film directed by Manoj Agrawal, starring Govinda, Raveena Tandon and Shilpa Shetty.

== Plot summary ==
Raju Pardesi (Govinda), a poor villager, relocates to Mumbai for a better life. He falls in love with a rich man's daughter, Chinni (Shilpa Shetty). Chinni's father opposes their love and challenges Raju to acquire INR one crore within a year if he wants to marry Chinni.

Raju has no idea how he will obtain that amount of money. After trying a few places, he is about to give up and go home. He goes to pray at a temple at a railway station and finds a suitcase full of money. Believing this to be the answer to his prayers, he uses the money to invest in a tea plantation.

Raju reaches the tea plantation in Darjeeling, where he meets Karuna (Raveena Tandon), the maid and caretaker of the estate house. Karuna begins to fall in love with the kind-hearted Raju.

He almost acquired the money he needed to marry Chinni when he learns Karuna’s backstory. Raju learns that Karuna’s father used to own the tea plantation. He put the plantation up as collateral to pay the dowry for Karuna’s wedding. However, her father lost the suitcase full of money at a railway station. Karuna’s wedding was called off, her father lost his sanity, and the plantation was foreclosed.

Raju realizes that the suitcase that changed his fortune belonged to Karuna’s father. Feeling guilty, he decides to marry Karuna and cuts ties with Chinni.

Chinni, worried about Raju, comes to the plantation to figure out what is going on. She finds out that Raju is about to marry another woman and is heartbroken. Raju explains why he is marrying Karuna, and Chinni reluctantly respects Raju’s decision. However, Karuna finds out Raju’s true motivations right before the wedding. She tells Raju that he should marry Chinni. The story ends with Pardesi and Chinni's marriage.

== Cast ==
- Govinda as Raju Pardesi
- Raveena Tandon as Karuna
- Shilpa Shetty as Chinni Chopra
- Shashikala as Mai, The Landlady
- Satish Kaushik as Harpal Happy Singh
- Aasif Sheikh as Nandu (Union leader of the factory)
- Virendra Saxena as Scientist (Oldton)
- Mohnish Behl as Naren, Chinni's prospective groom
- Arun Bakshi as Thief
- Avtar Gill as Doctor
- Rajeev Verma as Mr. Chopra, Chinni's father.
- Gavin Packard as Wrestler
- Suresh Chatwal as Referee in Wrestling Competition
- Deepak Qazir as Ramji, Karuna's father.

== Soundtrack ==
Pardesi Babu

Soundtrack album by Anand Raj Anand
- Released: 19 August 1998
- Genre: Feature film soundtrack
- Label: T-Series

The music of all the tracks of Pardesi Babu was composed by Anand Raj Anand. Tracks like "It Happens Only In India", "Jave Sajna Main Nahin Karna", and "Kuch Khona Hai Kuch Pana Hai" gained a lot of popularity, although all the tracks of the movie were popular. Mohammad Ali Ikram of PlanetBollywood.com quoted about the album-"Give Pardesi Babu a few listenings; it is an album which, as promised, comes Straight from the Heart."

#	Title	Singer(s)
1	"Kuch Khona Hai Kuch Pana Hai"	Udit Narayan
2	"Kya Hai Pyar Bataao Naa"	Udit Narayan, Kavita Krishnamurthy
3	"It Happens Only In India"	Anand Raj Anand
4	"Hai Nazuk Nazuk Halki Phulk"	Anand Raj Anand, Alka Yagnik, Aditya Narayan
5	"Jave Sajna Main Nahin Karna Tera Aitbaar"	Udit Narayan, Altaf Raja, Priti Uttam Singh, Ramkishan, Jeetendra, Poonam Bhatia, Bhavdeep Jaipurwale
6	"Pada Jeena Tere Bin Meri Jaany"	Udit Narayan, Kavita Krishnamurthy, Seema Anil Sehgal
