= Salaakhen (1998 film) =

1998 Indian Hindi action film

- Theatrical release poster
- Directed by: Guddu Dhanoa
- Written by: Dilip Shukla
- Produced by: Guddu Dhanoa; Rajiv Tolani
- Starring: Sunny Deol; Raveena Tandon; Amrish Puri; Anupam Kher; Rummy Dhillon; Deven Verma; Farida Jalal
- Cinematography: Shripad Natu
- Edited by: A. Muthu
- Music by: Songs: Dilip Sen–Sameer Sen; Score: Surinder Sodhi
- Production company: Bhagwan Chitra Mandir
- Distributed by: T-Series Films
- Release date: 24 April 1998 (India)
- Country: India
- Language: Hindi
- Budget: ₹9 crore
- Box office: ₹18.58 crore

Salaakhen (Bars) is a 1998 Indian Hindi-language action film directed by Guddu Dhanoa. It stars Sunny Deol and Raveena Tandon in pivotal roles. Upon release, it recorded an excellent opening and was a hit at the box office.

== Plot ==
The film starts with scenes in which police are in search of Vishal Agnihotri who is the killer of four prominent personalities of the city. Suddenly, Vishal comes on the scene talking with a prominent lawyer. He deals with the lawyer to prove him innocent in court for Rs.100 million. According to the deal, the lawyer proves Vishal innocent by presenting wrong witnesses wrongfully.

When the judge is about to announce the decision, Vishal kills his lawyer and accepts his guilt of killing four people. The news spreads in the media like a forest fire. An inquiry committee was constituted to see the other side of the picture in Vishal's case. Vishal appears before the committee and the film goes flashback - A Kandivali-based honest school-teacher, Sachidanand Agnihotri has always faced problems due to his honesty, first with Poornima School; then to a Government school, and now he has come forward to testify against the sexual assault and murder of a young woman from Worli. Sachidanand points an accusing finger at Nagesh, the son of prominent and influential Jaspal Rana. Sachidanand's family, which consists of his wife, Gayetri, and son, Vishal, attempt in vain to talk him out of testifying. Vishal falls in love with Neha. The Police are forced to arrest Nagesh and hold him in a cell.

Then the Police, headed by a corrupt Assistant Commissioner of Police, Kamble, attempts to intimidate Sachidanand and follow him everywhere under the pretext of protection. Sachidanand is driven out of his mind, and on the day of the testimony, Nagesh's lawyer, Ashok Pradhan, confuses him to such an extent that Sachidanand kills himself. Vishal, who is being held in prison for assaulting several policemen, breaks out, abducts Nagesh, and then kills Ashok Pradhan. When Kamble comes to Nagesh's rescue, Vishal kills both of them. He then hunts down Jaspal Rana and eventually kills him.

The film comes in the present. After listening to Vishal's story, the court hands Vishal a sentence of 4 years for which he tells the judge not to appoint people like Jaspal Rana to be ministers so people like him would have to take the law into their own hands.

== Cast ==
- Sunny Deol as Vishal Agnihotri
- Raveena Tandon as Neha – Vishal’s girlfriend
- Amrish Puri as Jaspal Rana
- Anupam Kher as Sachidanand Agnihotri – Vishal’s father
- Rummy Dhillon as Nagesh Rana – Jaspal’s son
- Farida Jalal as Gayatri – Vishal’s mother
- Deven Verma as Girivar – Neha’s father
- Mahavir Shah as ACP Arvind Kamble
- Mohan Joshi as Advocate Ashok Pradhan
- Dinesh Hingoo as Badri
- Harish Patel as Banteshwar
- Ravi Patwardhan as Advocate Jagdish Khurana
- Manisha Koirala (special appearance) as Dancer – In the item number "Pichhu Pade Hai"
- Mukesh Rawal (guest appearance) as Function organizer at public meeting

== Music and soundtrack ==
The music for the film's songs was composed by Dilip Sen–Sameer Sen and the lyrics were penned by Sameer. The background score of the movie was done by Surinder Sodhi.

Salaakhen

Soundtrack album by Dilip Sen-Sameer Sen
- Released: 4 February 1998
- Recorded: 1997–1998
- Genres: Feature film soundtrack, filmi
- Label: T-Series
- Producer: Dilip Sen-Sameer Sen

Salaakhen track listing
#	Title	Singer(s)
1	"Dhak Dhak"	Abhijeet, Shweta Shetty
2	"Pichhu Pade Hai"	Shweta Shetty
3	"Pagal Diwana Awara"	Vinod Rathod, Chithra
4	"Zubaan Pe Jo Nahin Aaye"	Udit Narayan, Chithra
5	"Punajbi Kudi Maare Jhatke"	Lalit Sen, Hema Sardesai
6	"Pagal Karna Pagal Hona"	Udit Narayan, Anuradha Paudwal
7	"Dil Mera Le Gayee"	Kumar Sanu, Alka Yagnik
