= Chal Chala Chal =

- DVD Cover
- Directed by: T. K. Rajeev Kumar
- Based on: Ee Parakkum Thalika (2001) by Thaha
- Produced by: Dharmesh Rajkotia; Manna Shetty; G.P. Vijayakumar
- Starring: Govinda; Rajpal Yadav; Reema Sen; Om Puri
- Cinematography: Madhu Neelakandan
- Edited by: Arun Kumar Aravind
- Music by: Songs: Anand Raj Anand; Anu Malik; Sunil Jha; Background Score: Sharreth
- Release date: 6 February 2009
- Running time: 125 minutes
- Country: India
- Language: Hindi

Chal Chala Chal is a 2009 Indian Hindi-language comedy film. The film is a remake of the 1989 Malayalam-language Indian film Varavelpu starring Mohanlal and many scenes from another Malayalam film Ee Parakkum Thalika, starring Dileep.

== Plot ==
A story of a simpleton whose life changes when he becomes the owner of a private bus. Deepak is a simpleton. He has been switching jobs as he does not want to succumb to the corrupt system. For years, with unwavering efforts, financial hardships, and unshaken faith in the judicial system, he has been helping his father Omkarnathji in a legal matter.

Omkarnathji, the ex-principal of a private school, is fighting a court case against the school to get his due provident fund and pension. He later wins the case, and the school is ordered to give a part of its property as compensation, but its funds have no money. And thus Deepak's life gets an addition: a bus. Instead of selling it off, acting on his father's advice, he decides to run the bus. While the rest of the family members - two sisters, Chhaya and Aprana, and their Ghar Jamai husbands, Vinayak Agrawal, a lawyer, and U.U. Upadhyay are against it. They feel it's a low-profile job. Their primary interest is in selling off the huge bus and devouring their share of property. But Deepak has immense trust in his father's judgment. Sundar, a jolly good sweetheart who is desperately trying for an American visa, is also an old friend. He comes in handy with initial investments, and they establish a company, Chal Chala Chal Transport. And so begins the ride of their lives. The bus is in a dilapidated condition, and much of the money is gone for the repairs. It's a roller-coaster ride where mishaps are more than the commuters. The bus driver, Basantilal, wears thick glasses, and the conductor, Harilal, has a sugar factory in his mouth and an eye for cash, adding to it like a cherry on the triple-decker pastry Sunder's enmity with a rat that has eaten his passport. Corruption chases Deepak in the transport business as well. U.U. Upadhyay is a chief vehicle inspector. He tried his best to harass Deepak and extort money, raising trouble. These workers are messing up Deepak's life and business, but he can't raise a finger against them, for they are under the cushioned wings of the Union Leader, Mr. Singh. Their only relief should have been the lovely lady on the bus, Payal, but the bus hits her, fracturing her leg. Now she is also in the vengeance mode, extorting money from Deepak. What saves Deepak from these madhouse characters is his faith in his principles and his father's love-acting as the strong backbone in bittersweet times.

== Cast ==
- Govinda as Deepak O. Nath (bus owner)
- Rajpal Yadav as Sunder Lala
- Reema Sen as Payal Ghosh
- Razak Khan as Basantilal (Bus Driver)
- Murli Sharma as Gajendra Singh (Union Leader)
- Asif Basra as Harilal Ahuja (Bus Conductor)
- Manoj Joshi as Uttam Upadhyay
- Upasna Singh as Chhaya U. Upadhyay
- Asrani as Advocate Vinayak Agrawal
- Amita Nangia as Arpana V. Agrawal
- Om Puri as Omkarnath
- Satyajit Sharma as Nirmal Kumar (Labour Officer)
- Veerendra Saxena as Banwari - Tailor
- Dolly Bindra - cameo
- Firdaus Mewawala as the Judge

== Music ==
The cassettes and audio CD's were released by Venus Records & Tapes LTD. The soundtrack lists are as below-

1. "Aplam Chaplam Ho Gayi Re" - Sunidhi Chauhan, Joi Barua
2. "Chanchal Hai Aankhein Tumhaari" - Sadhana Sargam, Shaan
3. "Gaanv Ke Pipal Tale" - Vinod Rathod
4. "Money Bhi Hai, Honey Bhi Hai" - Anand Raj Anand, Sneha Pant
5. Naacho Don't Se Bas, Gaao Don't Se Bas" - Anu Malik, Shaan
