= Heeralal Pannalal (1999 film) =

- DVD Cover
- Directed by: Kawal Sharma
- Written by: Anwar Khan(dialogues)
- Screenplay by: Praful Parekh; Rajeev Kaul
- Story by: Praful Parekh; Rajeev Kaul
- Produced by: Kewal Sharma
- Starring: Mithun Chakraborty; Johnny Lever; Payal Malhotra; Mohan Joshi; Shakti Kapoor; Pramod Moutho
- Cinematography: Anil Sehgal
- Edited by: A. Muthu
- Music by: Anand Raj Anand
- Distributed by: Indian Talkies
- Release date: 22 October 1999
- Running time: 130 minutes
- Language: Hindi

Heeralal Pannalal is a 1999 Indian Hindi-language action comedy film produced and directed by Kawal Sharma, in his directorial debut in Bengali cinema. Loosely inspired by Uttam Kumar starrer Bhranti Bilash (1963), the film stars Mithun Chakraborty and Johnny Lever, both portraying dual roles, alongside Mohan Joshi, Shakti Kapoor and Pramod Moutho in another pivotal roles. The film follows Heeralal and Pannalal – twin brothers who face humorous situations when they are mistaken for another set of twins with the same name.

The film marks the fifth collaboration between Sharma and Chakraborty, and also Lever's acting debut in Bengali cinema. Predominantly shot in Ooty, portions of the filming took places in Kolkata and Mumbai. Music of the film is composed by Anand Raaj Anand, with the Bengali and lyrics penned by Pulak Bandyopadhyay and Shaheen Iqbal respectively. Anil Sehgal handled its cinematography, while A. Muthu edited the film.

Heeralal Pannalal theatrically released on 22 October 1999. In the Hindi version of the film, Chakraborty's voice was dubbed by a dubbing artist, which created further controversy. The film was a disaster at the box office.

== Plot ==
Heeralal Pannalal is a comedy entertainer with Mithun and Johnny starring in parallel roles. It is the story of "two sets" of "twins" and both have been named "Heeralal" and "Pannalal"; they set out in search of love and adventure, but they are quite unaware of the presence of the other "set" of Heeralal and Pannalal.

== Cast ==
- Mithun Chakraborty as Heera Lal/himself (double role)
- Johnny Lever as Pannalal/himself (double role)
- Mohan Joshi as Kulkarni, Motiwala's brother
- Shakti Kapoor as Shekhar, Motiwala's elder brother
- Maleeka Ghai as Sarla, Police Commissioner's daughter
- Asrani as Constable Chaurasia
- Deven Verma as Mangalbhai
- Padmini Kapila as Mangalbhai's wife Raksha
- Raju Kher as Police Commissioner Dayal Singh
- Pramod Moutho as S.K. Motiwala
- Razak Khan as Babu
- Arun Bakshi as Pandit Shambhu (in song "Aaya Sherawali")
- Rana Jung Bahadur as Natwar (as Ranajung Bahadur)
- Benu Kalsi as (as Binu Kalsi)
- Ghanshyam Rohera as stage show organiser
- Veerendra Saxena as Bhagwat Choudhary
- Payal Malhotra as Bindu
- Raj Tilak as Judge Mrityunjay Saxena
- Lakhbir Singh Lakkha (Bhajan Singer) - Cameo Appearance

== Music ==
| # | Title | Singer(s) |
|---|---|---|
| 1 | "Ekka Dukka Tiya Du" | Udit Narayan, Vinod Rathod |
| 2 | "Aye Mithun Tu Pee Ke" | Vinod Rathod, Sudarshina |
| 3 | "Tere Bin Zindagi" | Udit Narayan, Anuradha Paudwal, Anand Raj Anand |
| 4 | "Badi Badi Ankh" | Udit Narayan, Vinod Rathod |
| 5 | "Aaja Sherawaliye" | Anand Raj Anand, Lakhbir Singh Lakkha |
