= 23rd March 1931: Shaheed =

2002 Indian film directed by Guddu Dhanoa

23 March 1931: Shaheed
- DVD cover
- Directed by: Guddu Dhanoa
- Screenplay by: Sultanu Gupta
- Dialogues by: Sanjay Masoomm
- Story by: Sultanu Gupta
- Produced by: Dharmendra
- Starring: Bobby Deol; Sunny Deol; Amrita Singh; Rahul Dev; Vicky Ahuja; Suresh Oberoi; Shakti Kapoor; Divya Dutta; Aishwarya Rai
- Cinematography: Tirru
- Edited by: Keshav Naidu
- Music by: Songs: Anand Raaj Anand; Score: Surinder Sodhi
- Production company: Sunny Super Sound
- Release date: 7 June 2002
- Running time: 190 minutes
- Country: India
- Language: Hindi
- Budget: ₹20 crore
- Box office: ₹14.25 crore

23rd March 1931: Shaheed is a 2002 Indian Hindi-language biographical historical drama based on the life of Indian revolutionary Bhagat Singh directed by Guddu Dhanoa. It depicts the events leading up to the hanging of Singh and his companions Shivaram Rajguru and Sukhdev Thapar on 23 March 1931. The film stars Bobby Deol as Bhagat Singh, his elder brother Sunny Deol as Chandra Shekhar Azad, Amrita Singh as Vidyavati Kaur Sandhu (Bhagat's mother) and Aishwarya Rai as Mannewali (special appearance), along with Rahul Dev, Vicky Ahuja, Vivek Shauq and Raja Bundela.

The film's release coincided with another film based on Bhagat Singh directed by Rajkumar Santoshi titled The Legend of Bhagat Singh. Both films failed at the box office.

== Plot ==
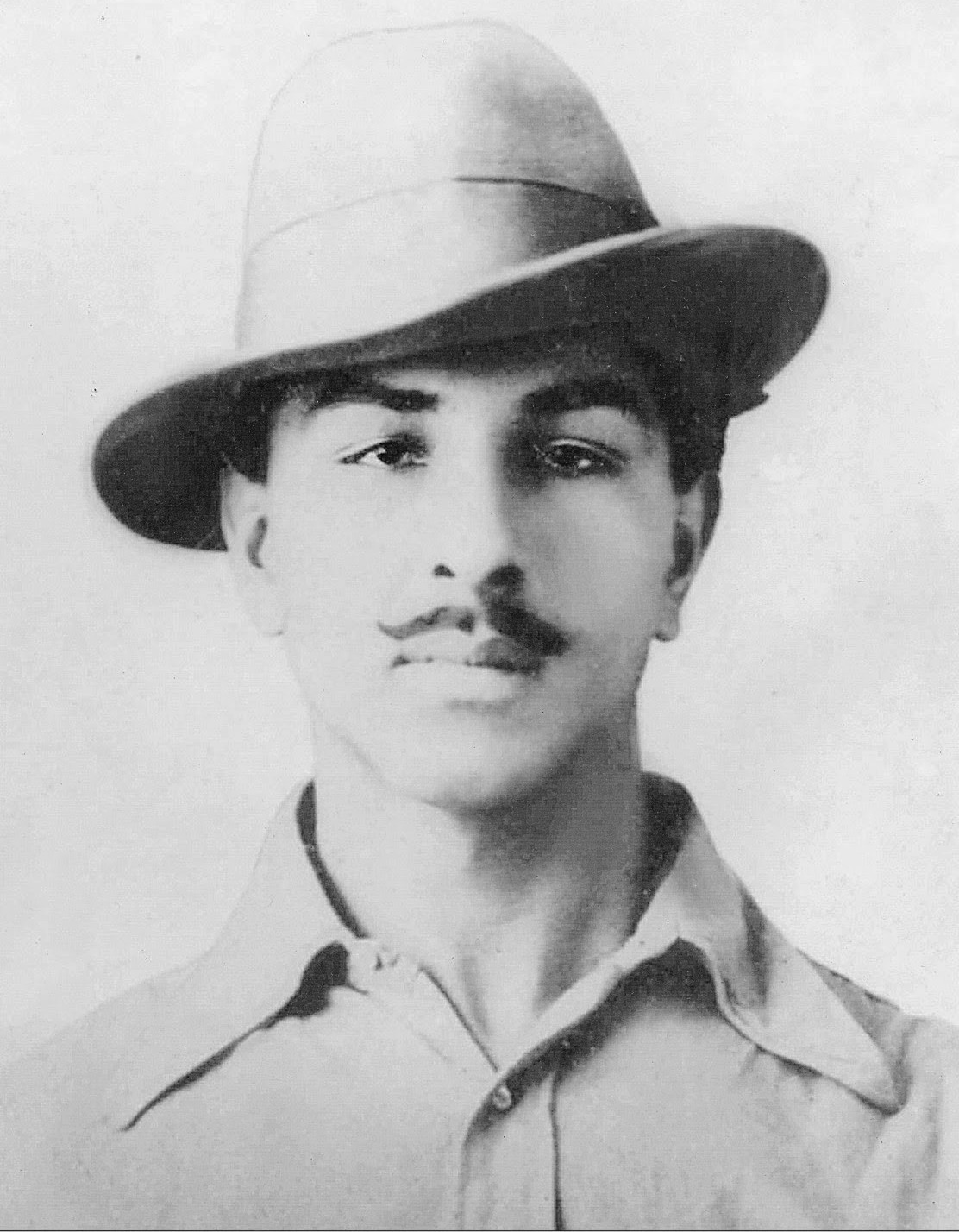
Bhagat Singh (1929)

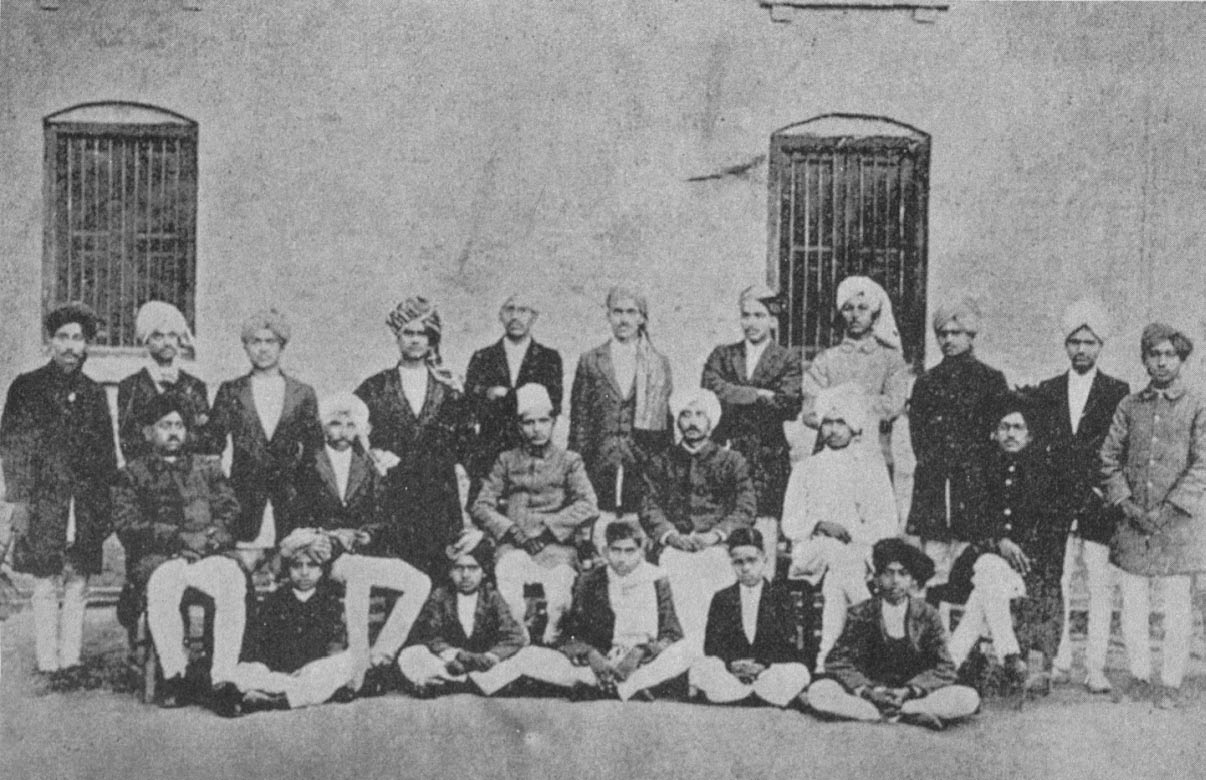
Photo of Singh (back row, fourth from right) in the Lahore College Drama Club (1924)

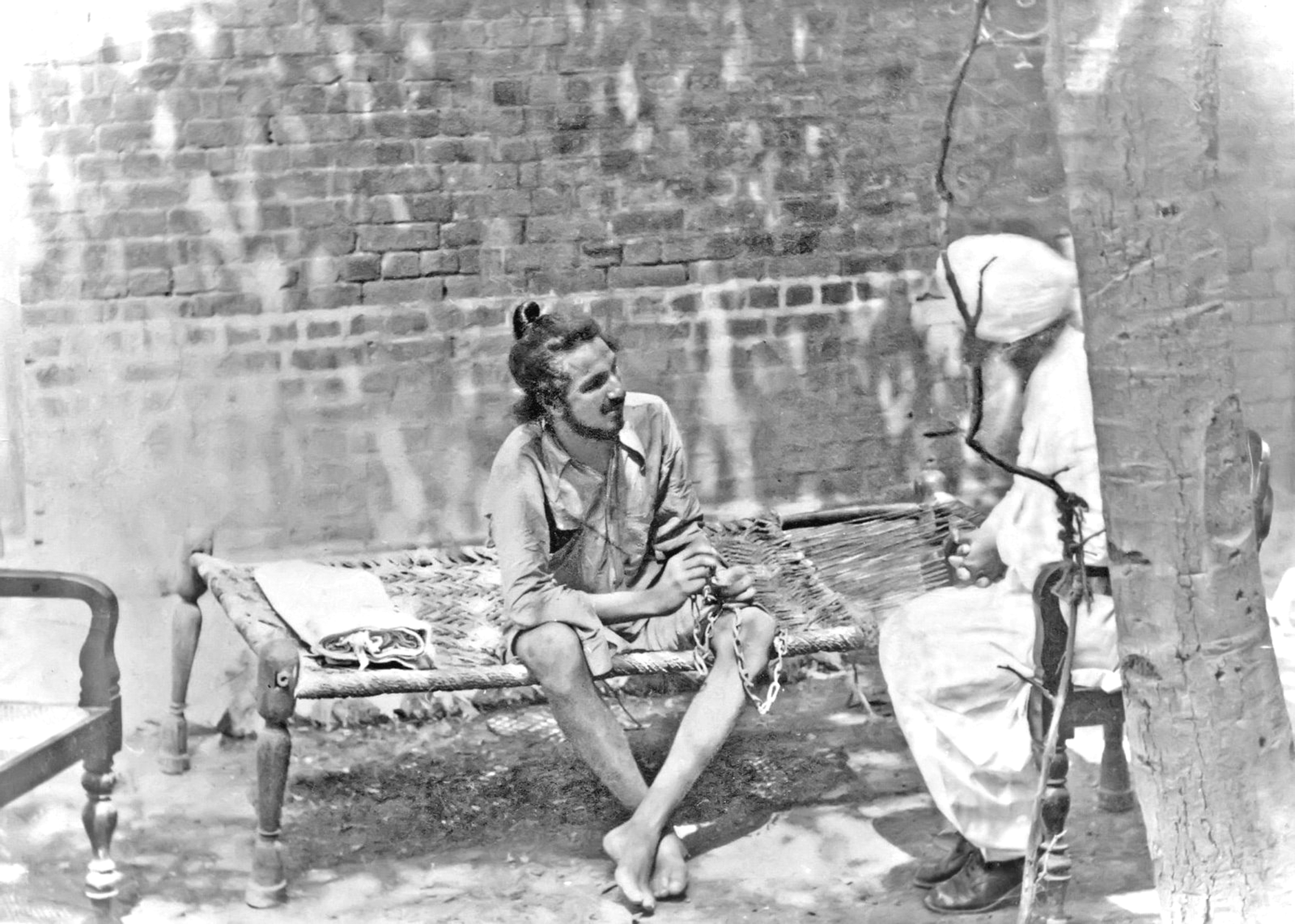
Singh's photo during his first arrest

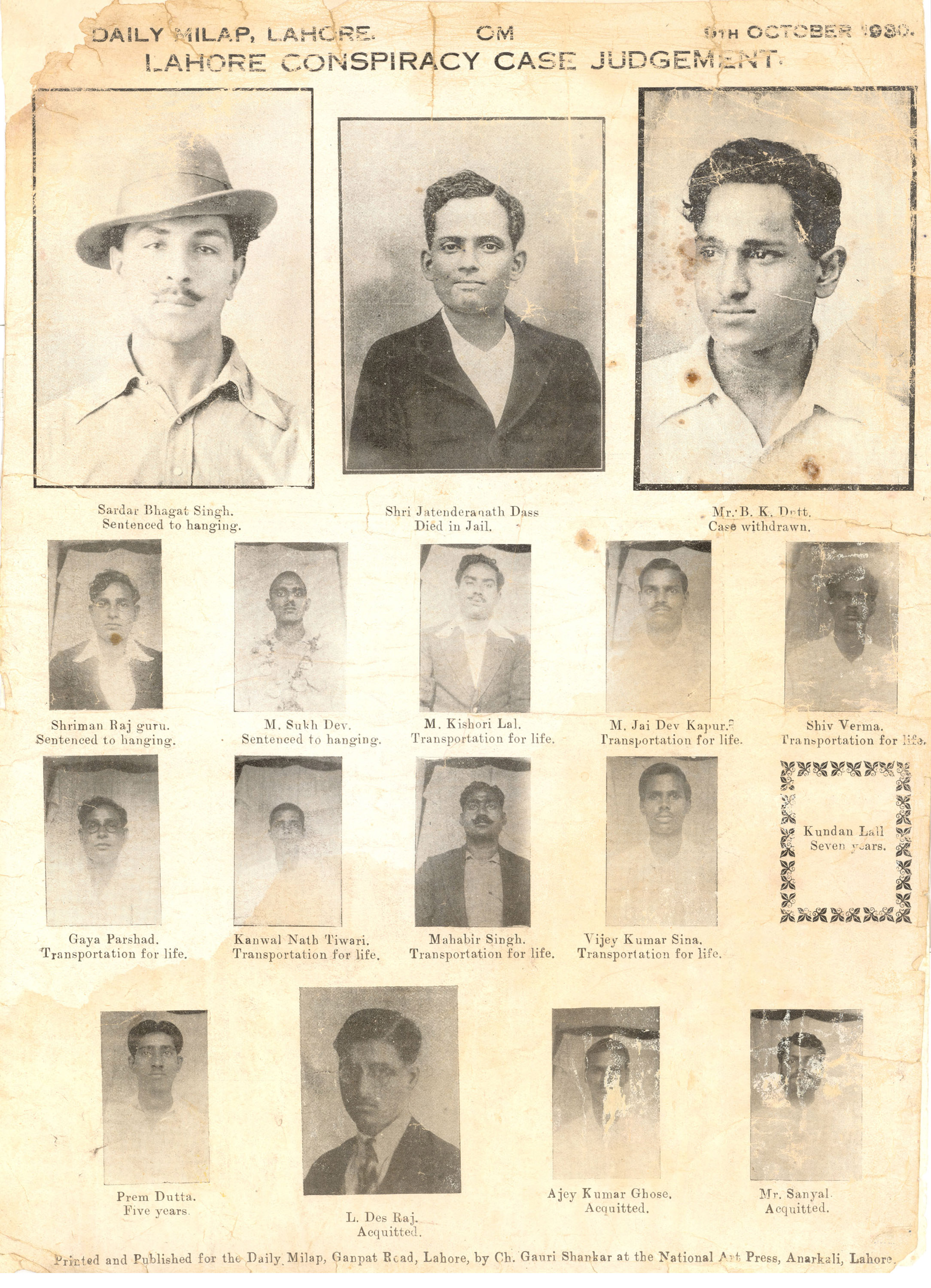
Lahore conspiracy case poster 9 October 1930

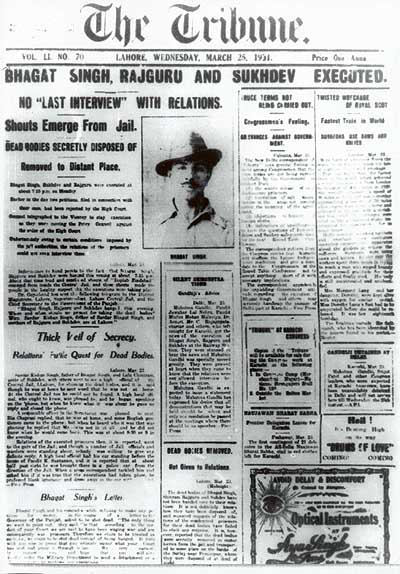
The Tribune (Lahore)'s front page headline on the 25th of March 1931: "BHAGAT SINGH, RAJGURU and SUKHDEV EXECUTED"

Set in the mid-1920s in British India, the film tells the story of freedom fighters Bhagat Singh and Chandrashekhar Azad, who have only one motive in mind: freedom for India. They set about doing this task together with two other men, Sukhdev and Rajguru. Bhagat Singh is enraged when his mentor Lala Lajpat Rai is mercilessly beaten to death by the police, and he sets about to avenge his death. He and his colleagues do succeed in killing one of the officials responsible, but they are identified, and as a result, Bhagat and Others are arrested and held in prison, where they are tortured relentlessly.

When produced in court, they dramatically admit to the killing and claim that it was done in the name of "freedom." The judge and the public prosecutor do not see it their way, and they are sentenced to life in prison. Bhagat's mother, Vidya, comes to meet him in prison, and he goes to greet her, shackled in chains from head to toe, and he foretells that India will continue to suffer, even after independence from the British, and that he will return in another birth to free his motherland. Subsequently, all three are charged with treason and assassination and are sentenced to death.

== Cast ==
- Sunny Deol as Chandra Shekhar Azad
- Bobby Deol as Bhagat Singh
- Amrita Singh as Vidyavati Kaur Sandhu, Bhagat's mother.
- Rahul Dev as Sukhdev Thapar
- Akshay Anand as Ram Prasad Bismil
- Vicky Ahuja as Shivaram Rajguru
- Divya Dutta as Durgawati Devi
- Aishwarya Rai as Mannewali, the girl Bhagat's family wanted him to marry. (special appearance)
- Raja Bundela as Lala Lajpat Rai
- Suresh Oberoi as Jailor Chaddha
- Shakti Kapoor as Jail Warden Chattar Singh
- Vivek Shauq as Bhagwati Charan Vohra
- Samaresh Routray as Yashpal
- Tej Sapru as Dilbagh Singh
- Rajesh Khera as Sardar Ajit Singh, Bhagat's uncle.
- Deepak Sharma as Jatindra Nath Das
- Suresh Chatwal as Pandit Kishori Lal
- Sachin Khedekar as Advocate Asaf Ali
- Manoj Tiwari as Virbhadra Tiwari
- Rana Jung Bahadur as Public Prosecutor Ashish Verma
- Ranjan Koshal as Kishan Singh Sandhu, Bhagat's father.
- Vivek Kumar Rawat as Batukeshwar Dutt
- Imran Khan as Kartar Singh Sarabha
- Raman Khatri as Ashfaqulla Khan
- Sanjay Tripathi as Hans Raj Vohra
- Indal Singh as Jai Gopal
- Mahendra Ghule as a constable

== Music ==
The music for the film’s songs was composed by Anand Raaj Anand with the lyrics penned by Dev Kohli. The background score was provided by Surinder Sodhi.

#	Song	Singer(s)
1	"Mera Rang De Basanti Chola"	Udit Narayan, Bhupinder Singh, Veer Rajinder
2	"Deshnu Challo"	Hans Raj Hans
3	"Jogiya Ve"	Alka Yagnik
4	"Watanparaston Ki"	Hans Raj Hans, Veer Rajinder
5	"Pagadi Sambhal"	Veer Rajinder
6	"Sarfaroshi Ki Tamanna"	Bhupinder Singh, Mohammad Salamat, Vinod Rathod
7	"Aye Watan"	Veer Rajinder
8	"Khush Raho"	Veer Rajinder

== Box office ==
The film failed to cover its budget thus underperforming at the box office, collecting only ₹14.25 crore by the end of its theatrical run.

Shubhra Gupta of Business Line attributed the film's commercial failure to its release on the same day as The Legend of Bhagat Singh, opining that "the two Bhagats ate into each other's business". The producer of the film The Legend of Bhagat Singh, Ramesh Taurani, also acknowledged this as a reason for his film's failure, along with the release of another Bhagat Singh film Shaheed-E-Azam the week before.

== See also ==
Other films based on Bhagat Singh:

- The Legend of Bhagat Singh - 2002 Indian film directed by Rajkumar Santoshi
- Shaheed-E-Azam - 2002 Indian film directed by Sukumar Nair
- Shaheed - 1965 Indian film directed by S. Ram Sharma

Other films based on Indian Independence Movement:

- Sardar Udham - 2021 Indian film directed by Shoojit Sircar – based on the life of Udham Singh
