= Aflatoon (1997 film) =

1997 film by Guddu Dhanoa

- DVD cover
- Directed by: Guddu Dhanoa
- Produced by: Guddu Dhanoa; Lalit Kapoor; Raju Narula
- Starring: Akshay Kumar; Urmila Matondkar; Anupam Kher
- Cinematography: Sripad V. Natu
- Edited by: A. Muthu
- Music by: Dilip Sen-Sameer Sen
- Production company: Bhagwan Chitra Mandir
- Release date: 19 December 1997
- Country: India
- Language: Hindi
- Box office: est.₹7.93 crore

Aflatoon (transl. Maverick) is an Indian Hindi-language masala film directed by Guddu Dhanoa. The film stars Akshay Kumar in dual roles along with Urmila Matondkar and Anupam Kher in supporting roles.

== Plot ==
Raja (Akshay Kumar), a good-for-nothing loafer trying to get rich quick, impersonates Parimal Chaturvedi, a college professor and enters into a college full of beautiful rich women. He falls for a rich girl Pooja (Urmila Matondkar), and manages to win her heart.

Trouble comes when Pooja's father Prakash (Anupam Kher) mistakes Raja for Rocky (also Akshay Kumar), a ruthless and merciless criminal who extorts money from people by threatening to kill them. Prakash, who is being threatened by Rocky, asks Raja for help, so Raja decides to impersonate Rocky to get his secrets and Prakash's money. But the tables are turned when Rocky finds out about Raja's game and decides to return the favor.

Raja wakes up and finds himself kidnapped and held by Rocky and his goons. He then realizes he has been drugged for the past seven days, and in these seven days, Rocky has posed as Raja and has convinced Raja's friends, mother, and Pooja that he is Raja, and is all set to marry Pooja. Rocky sets up an elaborate scheme where he robs a bank to frame Raja as Rocky, and kills his henchmen along with mortally wounding his girlfriend Sonia so no one can testify against him. Raja manages to convince an officer to believe him, and is given 24 hours to prove himself. Raja ends up crashing the wedding, where Sonia reveals the truth; desperate, Rocky escapes and goes on the run with Pooja as hostage. Raja follows him to a multi-story building where the two fight brutally. Raja gains the advantage and pushes Rocky off the building, who falls to his death. In the end Raja, marries Pooja.

== Cast ==
- Akshay Kumar as Raja / Rocky (dual role)
- Urmila Matondkar as Pooja, Raja's love interest.
- Shazia Malik as Sonia, Rocky's love interest.
- Farida Jalal as Raja's mother
- Harish Patel as the Police Commissioner Ibu Hatela
- Anupam Kher as Vidyaprakash, Pooja's father.
- Tiku Talsania as a Police Inspector Narayan Sinha
- Remo D'Souza as Raja's friend
- Subbiraj as College Principal Prithvi
- Sonia Sahni as College Professor Anita
- Sarad Sankla
- Brahmachari
- Dinesh Aanand
- Rajesh Joshi

Anita Bhandi

== Soundtrack ==
The song "We Love We Love Rocky" was inspired by Queen's song We Will Rock You. The song "Poster Lagwado Bazar Mein" was recreated by Tanishk Bagchi for 2019 film Luka Chuppi

#	Title	Singer(s)
1	"Aflatoon - Aflatoon"	Remo Fernandes
2	"Poster Lagwado Bazar Mein (Duet)"	Lalit Sen, Shweta Shetty
3	"Oye Oye Tere Si Ladki"	Udit Narayan, Anuradha Paudwal
4	"Uee Maa Uee Maa Mar Gayi Re"	Abhijeet, Anuradha Paudwal
5	"We Love We Love Rocky"	Vinod Rathod
6	"Tu Mange Dil Main De Doon Jaan"	Hariharan, Chitra
7	"Poster Lagwado Bazar Mein (Male)"	Lalit Sen
8	"Gori Chori Chori"	Alisha Chinai
