= Veerendra Saxena =

Indian actor (Born November 1960)

Virendra Saxena
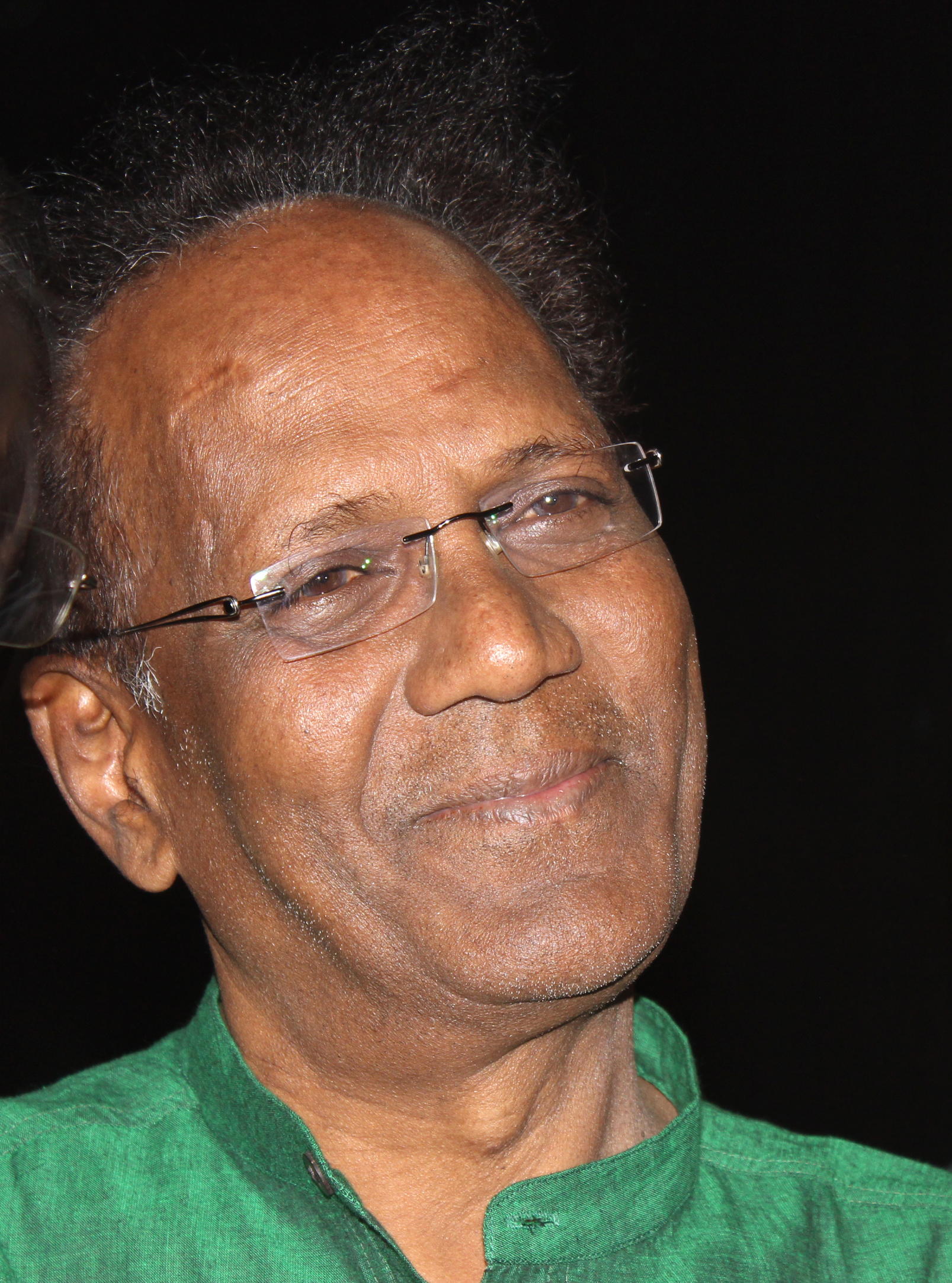
- Saxena in 2015
- Born: 23 November 1951 (age 74); Mathura, Uttar Pradesh, India
- Education: National School of Drama
- Occupation: Actor
- Years active: 1975–present
- Spouse: Samta Sagar

Virendra Saxena (born 23rd November 1951) is an Indian actor who works in Hindi theatre, film, and television. He is an alumnus of the National School of Drama. Saxena is known for his character roles as well as his unique voice. He made his movie debut in 1975 with "Uljhan". But he first received recognition with the 1985 movie "Massey Sahib". He has acted in more than 80 Indian films such as Aashiqui (1990), Dharavi (1992), Dilwale (1994), Kabhi Haan Kabhi Naa (1994), Split Wide Open (1999), Saathiya (2002), Samay: When Time Strikes (2003), Bunty Aur Babli (2005), Sarkar (2005), Ek Chalis Ki Last Local (2007), A Wednesday (2008), The Stoneman Murders (2009) and Naam Shabana (2017), Rabbi (2017), Sonu Ke Titu Ki Sweety (2018) and Super 30 (2019) and a few English-language films such as White Rainbow, Cotton Mary and In Custody. Prominent TV serials he has acted in include Ajnabi and Jassi Jaissi Koi Nahin.

== Filmography ==
=== Films ===
- Massey Sahib (1985)
- Khamosh (1986)
- Tamas (1986)
- Aashiqui (1990)
- Narsimha (1991)
- Dil Hai Ki Manta Nahin (1991)
- Vishnu-Devaa (1991)
- Dharavi (1992)
- Karamati Coat (1993)
- Angaar (1992)
- Suraj Ka Satvan Ghoda (1993)
- Kabhi Haan Kabhi Naa (1993)
- Damini (1993)
- Aaina (1993)
- Tejasvini (1994)
- Tarpan (1994)
- In Custody (1994)
- Amravati ki kathiya (1994)
- Naaraaz (1994)
- English, August (1994)
- Ram (1996)
- Tunnu Ki Tina (1997)
- Ziddi (1997)
- Pardesi Babu (1998)
- Heeralal Pannalal (1999)
- Arjun Pandit (1999)
- Double Gadbad (1999) as Tiger
- Split Wide Open (1999)
- Shool (1999)
- Cotton Mary (1999)
- Bichhoo (2000)
- Aks (2001)
- Maya (2001)
- Kaaboo (2002)
- Ghaav (2002)
- Saathiya (2002)
- Aapko Pehle Bhi Kahin Dekha Hai (2003)
- Jaal: The Trap (2003)
- Raghu Romeo (2003)
- Samay (2003)
- Dhoop (2003)
- Fun2shh (2003)
- Rudraksh (2004)
- Kismat (2004)
- Bardaasht (2004)
- Vanity Fair (2004)
- Bhola in Bollywood (2005)
- Vaada (2005)
- White Rainbow (2005)
- Bunty Aur Babli (2005)
- Sarkar (2005)
- Ek Chalis Ki Last Local (2007)
- Ram Gopal Varma Ki Aag (2007)
- A Wednesday (2008)
- Yeh Mera India (2009)
- The Stoneman Murders (2009)
- Housefull 2 (2012)
- Bheja fry 2
- The Mechanic
- Ata Pata Lapatta
- Bubble Gum
- Shagird
- Tera Kya Hoga Johnny
- Road, Movie
- Dekh Bhai Dekh
- Sankat City
- Ek Se Bure Do
- Chal Chala Chal
- Say Salaam India
- Krishna
- Karamati Coat
- Vishnu-Devaa
- Jigariyaa (2014)
- Mr Joe B. Carvalho (2014)
- Naam Shabana (2017)
- Mantostaan (2017)
- Lucknow Central (2017)
- Sonu Ke Titu Ki Sweety (2018)
- Super 30 (2019)
- Photograph (2019)
- Bombay Rose (2019)
- Commando 3 (2019)
- Baaghi 3 (2020)
- Chehre (2021)
- Bheed (2023) as Hari Dubey
- Mission Raniganj (2023)
- Ek Hindustani (TBA)

=== Television ===
Title	Notes
Ajnabi	
Dil Dariya	He played father to actor Shahrukh Khan
Aahat	
Sharad	
Jassi Jaissi Koi Nahin	Balwant Walia
Kis Desh Mein Hai Meraa Dil	
Mahayagya	
Bhanwar	
Chhajje Chhajje Ka Pyaar	
Afsar Bitiya	
Amaravati ki Kathayein	Episode 2 "Don't Tell Anyone"- Shankaraiyya/ Episode 3 "Saree"- Venkaiyah/Episode 7 "Nosering" - Bacchikaadu
Kitani Mohabbat Hai	(season 1)
Yatra	
Byomkesh Bakshi	Episode: Tasvir Chor as Dr. Ghatak
Wagle Ki Duniya	Society Day
Bharat Ek Khoj	
Keele Ka Rahasya	
Phir Wahi Talash	
Bhagya Lakshmi	Manoj Singh Bajwa
Guilty Minds	
The Kapil Sharma Show (2025)	As himself with cast of Jassi Jaisa Koi Nahin
Taskaree	As Shrikant Saxena Netflix series

== Personal life ==
He is married to actor-writer Samta Sagar.
