= Shahbaz Khan (actor) =

Indian television actor (born 1966)

- Born: Haider Khan; 10 March 1966 (age 60); Indore, Madhya Pradesh, India
- Occupation: Actor
- Years active: 1989–present
- Height: 6 ft 4 in (1.93 m)
- Spouse: Ruhana Khan
- Children: Shahana Khan (daughter); Shanaya Khan (daughter)
- Parents: Amir Khan (father); Raisa Khan (mother)

Shahbaz Khan (born 10 March 1966, Haider Khan) is an Indian actor from Indore, Madhya Pradesh. He is famous for playing lead roles in television serials such as Chandrakanta, The Great Maratha, and The Sword of Tipu Sultan.

== Early life ==
Shahbaz Khan is originally from Indore, and is a son of Padma Bhushan winner Ustad Amir Khan, a doyen of Indian classical music. He had studied in St Joseph Convent, Kamptee and Hislop College Nagpur, then had worked at Centre Point Hotel Nagpur for few years before moving to Mumbai.

== Filmography ==
Year	Film	Role
1991	Nachnewale Gaanewale	Chandar
1993	Dhartiputra	Anwar Khan
1993	Kaise Kaise Rishte	Ravi
1993	Meri Aan	Sher Khan
1994	Dhuan Hi Dhuan	
1995	Jai Vikraanta	D.I.G. Sher Ali Khan
1997	Ziddi	Lal Singh
1997	Darmiyaan: In Between	Inder Kumar Bhalla
1997	Share Bazaar	Raj
1997	Amirzaada	
1998	Qila	Inspector Rana
1998	Major Saab	Vicky Bihari
1998	Mehndi	Rajeshwar
1999	International Khiladi	Police Commissioner
1999	Jai Hind	Wali Shah
1999	Hindustan Ki Kasam	Lieutenant General Hyder
1999	Arjun Pandit	Sanjay Sharma
2000	Jwalamukhi	Sir David
2000	Badal	Asgar
2000	Chal Mere Bhai	Rakesh
2000	Raja Ko Rani Se Pyar Ho Gaya	
2000	Raju Chacha	Babu
2001	Officer	Awasti
2001	Baghaawat Ek Jung	Police Inspector
2001	Jagira	
2001	Pyaar Zindagi Hai	Lt. Col. Jagat Khanna
2001	Kyo Kii... Main Jhuth Nahin Bolta	Mr. Vinod Kalra
2002	Aap Mujhe Achche Lagne Lage	Kania Pathan
2002	Hum Kisise Kum Nahin	
2002	Yeh Hai Jalwa	Chotu
2002	Jaani Dushman: Ek Anokhi Kahani	Raju
2002	Karz: The Burden of Truth	Police Inspector Khan
2003	Taj Mahal - A Monument Of Love	
2003	Khwahish	Doctor Medora
2003	The Hero: Love Story of a Spy	Idris Malik
2003	Hawa	Dr. Asif Ali
2003	Jaal: The Trap (2003), as	Captain Amarjeet Indian Army
2004	Kismat	Raj Mallya's son
2004	Masti	
2004	Dukaan: Pila House	Havaldar
2004	Woh	Police Inspector Sameer Yadav

- Kismat (2004), as Raj Mallya's son
- Woh (2004), as Police Inspector Sameer Yadav
- Masti (2004)
- Dukaan: Pila House (2004), as Havaldar
- Tango Charlie (2005) as Army Officer
- The Rising: Ballad of Mangal Pandey (2005), as Azimullah Khan
- Mr Prime Minister (2005)
- Rafta Rafta – The Speed (2006), as Ponty Chaddha
- Ladies Tailor (2006), as Jeeva
- Ghutan (2007)
- Mr. Hot Mr. Kool (2007), as Lele
- Big Brother (2007), as Rajji Pandey
- The Last Lear (2007)
- The Game of Love (2009), as Gullu (uncredited)
- Veer (2010), as Naunihaal
- Looteri Dulhan (2011)
- Agent Vinod (2012), as Colonel Huzefa Lokha
- Barbreek (2012)
- JUST U & ME (2013)
- Singh Saab the Great (2013), as Jata Singh
- Bikkar Bai Sentimental as Police Inspector (2013) Punjabi Film
- Mahabharat Aur Barbareek (2013), as Ghatotkacha
- Unforgettable (2014), as Munshiji
- Jatt James Bond (2014) as Police Inspector Punjabi Film
- Gajakesari (2014) as Raja Jayasurya Bahaddur, Kannada film
- Keep Safe Distance (2016), Rama Dhanraj production
- Romeo & Radhika (2016), Gujarati film
- Dhingana (2017) Marathi Film
- Raktdhar (2017)
- Dying to Survive (2018), Chinese film
- Touch Chesi Chudu (2018) as Rauf Lala Telugu film
- Turning Point (2018), by Pruthvi Film Industries
- Badla Hindustani Ka (2018)
- Hum(Short Film) (2018)
- Risknamaa (2019), by Kirti Motion Pictures Aarun Nagar
- Border 2 (2026) as Naib Subedar Zail Singh 6 Sikh

== Television ==
Year	Serial	Role	Notes
1990	The Sword of Tipu Sultan	Hyder Ali	
1994	The Great Maratha	Mahadji Shinde	
1994–1996	Chandrakanta	Kunwar Virendra Vikram	
1996	Prithviraj Raso	Prithviraj Chauhan	
1996	Chandni		
1997	Yug	Virendra "Veeru" Singh	
1997–1998	Neeyat		
1997	Betaal Pachisi	Betaal	
1998	Main Dilli Hoon	Prithviraj Chauhan	
2001	Draupadi	Karna	
2002	Amrapali		
2002–2003	Ssshhhh...Koi Hai	Mayakaal	
2006	Suno... Harr Dill Kuchh Kehtaa Hai		
2006	C.I.D.	Karan	
2007	C.I.D.	Don	
2007	Saat Phere: Saloni Ka Safar	Padam Singh	
2007–2009	Naaginn	Bhairavnath	
2008	Raavan	Ahiravan / Sahastrarjun	
2008–2009	Grihasti	Tauji	
2009	Mitwa Phool Kamal Ke	Maamchand Chaudhary	
2010	Maharaja Ranjit Singh	Jassa Singh Ahluwalia	
2010	Aahat	the guy	Episode 1: Shaitaani Aaina
2010	Aahat	Himself	Episode 26: Maut Ka Khel
2011–2012	Afsar Bitiya	Tuntun Singh	
2011–2012	Dekha Ek Khwaab	Maharaj Briraj	
2013–2014	Ek Ghar Banaunga	Mata Singh	
2013–2015	Bharat Ka Veer Putra – Maharana Pratap	Bairam Khan	
2015–2016	Santoshi Maa	Pratap Mishra	
2016	Dil Aashna Hai		
2017–2018	Karmaphal Daata Shani	Ravana	
2018	Tenali Rama	Babur	
2018–2019	Dastaan-E-Mohabbat Salim Anarkali	Akbar	
2019	Ram Siya Ke Luv Kush	Maharaj Janaka	
2019	Naye Shaadi Ke Siyape	Mubarak Khan	
2019	Phir Laut Aayi Naagin	Tejeshwar Singh	
2021	Yeh Rishta Kya Kehlata Hai	Narendranath Chauhan	
2021	Mauka-E-Vardaat	Senior Inspector Khan	
2022	Nath – Zewar Ya Zanjeer	Garjan Mishra	
2022	Jai Hanuman – Sankatmochan Naam Tiharo	Bhairavnath	
2023	Tulsidham Ke Laddu Gopal	Bhairavnath	
2024	Lakshmi Narayan – Sukh Samarthya Santulan	Maharaj Kans	
2025	Apollena – Sapno Ki Unchi Udann	Mahadev Pandey	
2025–2026	Pati Brahmachari	Gulab Singh	

=== Plays ===
- Ayodhya ki Ramlila (2020, 2021,2022) as Ravana
