= Guddu Dhanoa =

Indian writer, producer and director

- Occupations: Film director film producer writer
- Years active: 1992–present
- Relatives: Dharmendra (cousin); Sunny Deol (first cousin once removed); Bobby Deol (first cousin once removed); Abhay Deol (first cousin once removed); Esha Deol (first cousin once removed)

Guddu Dhanoa is an Indian writer, producer and director. He is mainly known for making Hindi films. He directed several action films, most notably Ziddi, starring Sunny Deol, and Bichhoo, starring Bobby Deol.

== Personal life ==
He is a cousin of the actor Dharmendra.

His brothers are former actor Narendra and actor-producer Vijay Dhanoa.

== Career ==
He started as a producer for Shahrukh Khan who starred in Dhanoa's 1992 film Deewana. He directed 1997 film Ziddi starring Sunny Deol which was a success at the box office. His other Hindi language films as a director includes Elaan (1994), Tu Chor Main Sipahi (1996), Aflatoon (1997), Bichhoo (2000), 23rd March 1931: Shaheed (2002), Hawa (2003), Jaal: The Trap (2003) and Big Brother. In 2011, he directed his first Punjabi language film The Lion of Punjab, followed by another Ramtaa Jogi (2015).

In year 2000, Dhanoa produced and directed a revenge drama film Bichhoo with Bobby Deol and Rani Mukherjee. The film was an unofficial remake of Léon: The Professional (1994), a French film. A sequel of this film was also planned which never went into production. In 2002, he directed 23rd March 1931: Shaheed with Bobby Deol playing the lead role of Shaheed Bhagat Singh and Sunny Deol playing freedom fighter Chandra Shekhar Azad. The film clashed at the box office with Legend of Bhagat Singh, another film based on Shaheed Bhagat Singh. 23 March 1931: Shaheed was a box office failure. In the year 2003, he produced and directed a supernatural thriller Hawa, featuring Tabu. The film was heavily inspired from the 1982 Hollywood film The Entity and received poor reviews. He shot his 2003 film Jaal: The Trap in Himanchal Pradesh. During the shooting of this film Indian actor Amrish Puri had a serious accident which caused serious injury to his face and eyes.

== Filmography ==
Year	Title	Producer	Director	Language
1992	Deewana	Yes		Hindi
1994	Elaan		Yes	Hindi
1995	Gundaraj		Yes	Hindi
1996	Tu Chor Main Sipahi		Yes	Hindi
1997	Ziddi		Yes	Hindi
1997	Aflatoon	Yes	Yes	Hindi
1998	Salaakhen	Yes	Yes	Hindi
2000	Bichhoo	Yes	Yes	Hindi
2002	23rd March 1931: Shaheed		Yes	Hindi
2003	Hawa	Yes	Yes	Hindi
2003	Jaal: The Trap		Yes	Hindi
2004	Kismat	Yes	Yes	Hindi
2007	Big Brother	Yes	Yes	Hindi
2011	The Lion of Punjab		Yes	Punjabi
2015	Ramta Jogi		Yes	Punjabi
2025	Romeo S3		Yes	Hindi
