= Anand Raaj Anand =

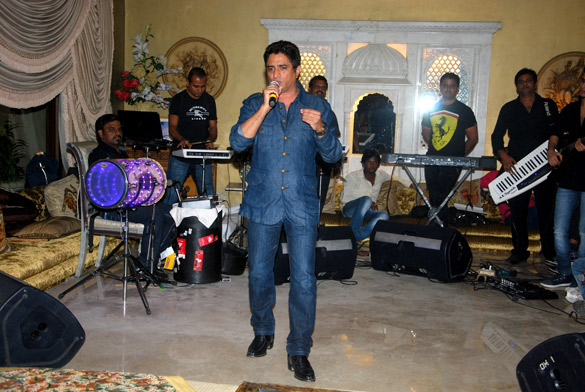
- Anand Raj Anand in 2012

Background information
- Born: 14 November 1962 (age 63); Delhi, India
- Origin: Delhi, India
- Genre: Film score
- Occupations: Lyricist, film score composer, singer
- Years active: 1995–present

Anand Raaj Anand (born 14 November 1962) is an Indian composer, lyricist and playback singer in the Hindi film industry. His early breakthrough came with the song "Chhota Bachha Jaan Ke" from the 1996 film Masoom. and went on to work in films like Kaante, Musafir, Welcome, Shootout at Lokhandwala, Double Dhamaal, Singh Saab the Great and Shootout at Wadala.

He received a Filmfare Award for Best Music Director nomination for Kaante (2003).

== Early life ==
Anand Raaj was born on 14 November 1962 in Delhi in a family of jewellers. In 1995, he left his family business and went to Mumbai to pursue musical career.

His younger brother Harry Anand is also a singer-composer.

== Career ==
Anand moved to Mumbai in 1995 with the intention of becoming a playback singer. In 1995, his first private album was "Babu Tiptop" on Time Music. "Jhanjharia uski chhanak gayi", from this album was later used in the film Krishna by Time Audio (also known as Time Magnetics). He later said that, after struggling for about a year, his first break came with the 1996 film Masoom, for which he composed and sang, the song "Chhota Bachcha Jaan Ke" from the film became one of his early hits, along with Kale Libaas Mein and Tukur Tukur Dekhte Ho Kya. Since then, he has been the music director and composer of over 90 films, the lyricist of over 40 soundtracks, and he did playback singing for over 45 films.

His best-known work includes Pardesi Babu, Hadh Kar Di Aapne, Bichhoo, Jis Desh Mein Ganga Rehta Hai, Kaante, Kismat, Musafir, Welcome, Shootout at Lokhandwala, Double Dhamaal, Singh Saab The Great, and Shootout at Wadala.

After a break, he made a comeback in 2026, with the song "Ucha Lamba Kad Forever" in Welcome to the Jungle (2026).

== Personal life ==
Anand is married and has two daughters.

In 2026, Anand spoke publicly about having experienced clinical depression after stepping away from the Hindi film industry and moving to London.

== Discography ==
=== Films ===
Year	Film	Role	Notes
1996	Masoom	Composer	
1997	Kaalia	Composer	
1997	Ghoonghat	Composer	
1997	Koi Kisi Se Kum Nahin	Composer	
1998	2001: Do Hazaar Ek	Composer	
1998	Aakrosh	Composer	
1998	Qila	Composer	
1998	Major Saab	Composer, lyricist, playback singer	
1998	Gunda	Composer	
1998	Tirchhi Topiwale	Composer	
1998	Bandhan	Composer	
1998	Pardesi Babu	Composer, playback singer	
1999	Lo Main Aagayaa	Composer	
1999	Hote Hote Pyar Ho Gaya	Composer	
1999	Heeralal Pannalal	Composer	
2000	Hadh Kar Di Aapne	Composer, playback singer	
2000	Bichhoo	Composer	
2000	Jis Desh Mein Ganga Rehta Hai	Composer, playback singe	
2000	Champion	Composer, playback singer	Song "Jatt Lutiya Gaya"; singers: Shankar Sahney, Hema Sardesai
2001	Jodi No.1	Composer	
2001	Kyo Kii... Main Jhuth Nahin Bolta	Composer	
2001	Indian	Composer	
2001	Tera Mera Saath Rahen	Composer	
2001	Ehsaas: The Feeling	Composer, playback singer	
2001	Dishayen	Composer	TV series
2002	Pitaah	Composer	
2002	Yeh Mohabbat Hai	Composer	
2002	23rd March 1931: Shaheed	Composer, playback singer	
2002	Yeh Hai Jalwa	Composer	
2002	Jaani Dushman: Ek Anokhi Kahani	Composer	
2002	Gunaah	Composer	
2002	Zindagi Khoobsoorat Hai	Composer, playback singer	
2002	Hathyar	Composer	
2002	Annarth	Composer	
2002	Maseeha	Composer	
2002	Kaante	Composer, playback singer	Nominated: Filmfare Award for Best Music Director
2003	Pyaar Kiya Nahin Jaatha	Composer	
2003	Bhoot	Composer	
2003	Jaal: The Trap	Composer, playback singer	
2003	Calcutta Mail	Composer	
2003	Mumbai Matinee	Composer	
2003	Ek Hindustani	Composer, playback singer	
2003	Jodi Kya Banayi Wah Wah Ramji	Composer	
2003	Out of Control	Composer	
2003	Janasheen	Composer	
2004	Plan	Composer, playback singer	
2004	Kismat	Composer, playback singer	
2004	Masti	Composer, playback singer	
2004	Shikaar	Composer	
2004	Rakht	Composer	
2004	Ek Se Badhkar Ek	Composer	
2004	Wajahh: A Reason to Kill	Composer	
2004	Musafir	Composer	
2005	Padmashree Laloo Prasad Yadav	Composer	
2005	Bullet: Ek Dhamaka	Composer	
2005	Chaahat Ek Nasha	Composer	
2005	Jurm	Composer	
2005	Tango Charlie	Composer	
2005	Kaal	Composer 1 song nassa nassa	
2005	Jo Bole So Nihaal	Composer	
2005	Viruddh... Family Comes First	Composer	
2005	Orey Pandu	Composer	Telugu film
2006	Humko Tumse Pyaar Hai	Composer, playback singer	
2006	Love Ke Chakkar Mein	Composer	
2006	Vidyaarthi	Composer	
2006	Aryan: Unbreakable	Composer	
2006	Sarhad Paar	Composer	
2006	My Bollywood Bride	Composer	
2007	Welcome	Composer, playback singer	
2007	Dus Kahaniyaan	Composer, Playback Singer	
2007	Dhan Dhana Dhan Goal	Playback singer	
2007	Chhodon Naa Yaar	Composer, Playback singer	
2007	Shootout at Lokhandwala	Composer	
2007	Sirf Romance: Love by Chance	Composer	
2007	Nehlle Pe Dehlla	Composer	Co-Composer: Himesh Reshammiya
2007	Big Brother	Composer, playback singer	
2007	Deha	Composer	
2008	C Kkompany	Composer	
2008	Lakh Pardesi Hoiye	Composer	
2008	Haal–e–dil	Composer	
2008	Jimmy	Composer, playback singer	
2008	Mithya	Composer	
2009	Baabarr	Composer, lyricist	
2009	Shadow	Composer, Lyricist	
2009	Chal Chala Chal	Composer	
2010	No Problem	Composer, lyricist, playback singer	
2010	Benny and Babloo	Composer	
2010	Ek Second... Jo Zindagi Badal De...	Composer	
2011	Double Dhamaal	Composer, lyricist, playback singer	
2011	Bin Bulaye Baraati	Composer, lyricist, playback singer	
2011	Violin	Composer	Malayalam film
2011	Chalo Dilli	Composer, lyricist	
2011	The Lion of Punjab	Composer, playback singer	Punjabi Film
2012	Matinee	Composer	Malayalam film
2012	Chakradhaar	Composer, Playback singer	
2012	Agneepath	Playback singer	
2013	Super Nani	music director	
2013	Shootout at Wadala	music director	
2013	Singh Sahab the Great	Composer	
2013	Grand Masti	Composer	
2013	Toofan	Composer	Telugu film
2013	Zanjeer	Composer	
2013	Deewana Main Deewana	Composer and lyricist	
2013	Mumbai Mirror	Composer	
2016	Dil Toh Deewana Hai	Composer, playback singer	
2016	Mastizaade	music director	
2017	Shaadi Mein Zaroor Aana	Composer, Playback Singer	
2019	Officer Arjun Singh IPS Batch 2000	Composer, playback singer	

=== Albums ===
Year	Album	Role	Singer(s)	Notes
1995	Babu Tiptop	Composer, Playback Singer	Anand Raj Anand	
1997	Yeh Umre Hai Aisi	Lyricist	MG Sreekumar, Nibedita	First album only as a lyricist
1998	Maiyya Rani	Composer, Playback Singer	Anuradha Paudwal, Udit Narayan, Suresh Wadkar, Sukhwinder Singh, Babla Mehta, Anand Raj Anand	
1999	Jaikara Album	Composer, Playback Singer	Anand Raj Anand	
2000	Chorni	Composer	Hans Raj Hans	
2000	Suno To Deewana Dil	Composer	Kamaal Khan	
2000	Ab Ke Baras	Composer	Suneeta Rao	
2001	Sab Ton Sohni	Composer	Hans Raj Hans	

== See also ==
- Films scored by Anand Raj Anand
