= Jaal: The Trap =

- Theatrical release poster
- Directed by: Guddu Dhanoa
- Screenplay by: Rajeev Kaul; Praful Parekh
- Dialogues by: Dilip Shukla
- Story by: Rajeev Kaul; Praful Parekh
- Produced by: Vinod Shah; Harish Shah
- Starring: Sunny Deol; Tabu; Reema Sen; Amrish Puri; Anupam Kher; Mukesh Rishi; Ashish Vidyarthi
- Cinematography: Sripad Natu
- Edited by: Sanjay Verma
- Music by: Songs: Anand Raaj Anand; Score: Aadesh Shrivastava
- Production company: Parth Productions
- Distributed by: B4U Entertainment
- Release date: 18 July 2003
- Running time: 158 minutes
- Country: India
- Language: Hindi

Jaal: The Trap is a 2003 Indian Hindi-language action-thriller film directed by Guddu Dhanoa. It stars Sunny Deol, Tabu and Reema Sen, along with Amrish Puri, Anupam Kher, Mukesh Rishi and Ashish Vidyarthi. It was released on 18 July 2003.

== Plot ==
In the hilly areas of Mashobra, Shimla reside the Kaul family, consisting of Major Amrish, his wife Sudha, a daughter, and a son, Ajay. Ajay meets with two accidents on his motorcycle due to the carelessness of Neha Pandit; this leads to their meeting again, and both fall in love. Ajay finds out that Neha has been widowed, but this does not deter him, and he convinces her father-in-law, R. K. Sharma, to bless them, which he does. Shortly after his approval, Neha is abducted by terrorist group Wafa-e-Alhak headed by Junaid Afghani, who demand the release of their chief Naved Rabhani, and in exchange for Neha, Anita Choudhary, the daughter of India's Home Minister Bhagwat Choudhary. Ajay is tasked with abducting Anita and bringing her to them if he is to ever see Neha alive again, but Anita has now relocated to New Zealand under the security of Major Amrish Kaul. Ajay travels to New Zealand, Anita falls in love with him, and he manages to bring her to Junaid, but confronts him to rescue both Anita and Neha. When it is revealed that Neha is the wife of Naved Rabbani, her father, Krishnakant, is Captain Rashid and was playing all along to trap Ajay. Anita is taken away, and Ajay is thrown off a cliff and branded as a terrorist by the government and public. Ajay then goes incognito to set things right, and he finally kills all the terrorists, including Neha, and saves Anita. He finally gets united with Anita.

== Cast ==
- Sunny Deol as Ajay Kaul
- Tabu as Neha Pandit / Nusrat Rabbani – Ajay’s gaslighting ex-girlfriend, who is actually Naved’s wife
- Reema Sen as Anita Chaudhary – Ajay’s girlfriend
- Amrish Puri as Major Amrish Kaul – Ajay's father
- Anupam Kher as R. K. Sharma/Captain Rashid – Naved's associate
- Mukesh Rishi as Junaid – Naved's associate
- Ashish Vidyarthi as Naved Rabbani – Nusrat's husband
- Farida Jalal as Sudha Kaul – Ajay's mother
- Virendra Saxena as Minister Bhagwat Chaudhary – Anita's father
- Shahbaaz Khan as Captain Amarjeet Singh – Amrish's junior officer
- Susheel Parashar as Police Inspector
- Ghanshyam Rohera as Sukhwinder Billa – Taxi driver
- Rajesh Khera as Journalist Alok Dass – Ajay ji ki dost

== Music and soundtrack ==
Jaal: The Trap

Studio album by Anand Raj Anand
- Released: September 13, 2002
- Genre: Feature film soundtrack
- Label: Universal Music India

The music for the songs of the film was composed by Anand Raaj Anand and the lyrics were penned by Sameer and Anand Raaj Anand. The background score of the movie was done by Aadesh Shrivastava. The track "Indian Indian" and "Sona Sona Soniye" gained popularity during the release.

#	Title	Singer(s)
1	"Ek Ladki Bas Gayi"	Udit Narayan
2	"Humsafar Ke Liye"	Alka Yagnik, Anand Raaj Anand
3	"Indian Indian"	Anand Raaj Anand
4	"Jo Pyar Tumne"	Zubeen, Chitra, KK
5	"Pehla Pehla Pyar Ho Gaya"	Kumar Sanu
6	"Sona Sona Soniye"	Udit Narayan
