= Ziddi (1997 film) =

- Theatrical release poster
- Directed by: Guddu Dhanoa
- Screenplay by: Robin Henry
- Dialogues by: Dilip Shukla
- Story by: Robin Henry
- Produced by: N.R. Pachisia
- Starring: Sunny Deol; Raveena Tandon; Raj Babbar; Anupam Kher; Ashish Vidyarthi; Shahbaz Khan; Sharat Saxena
- Cinematography: Sripad Natu
- Edited by: A. Muthu
- Music by: Songs: Dilip Sen–Sameer Sen; Score: Surinder Sodhi
- Production company: Ratan International
- Distributed by: Eros International
- Release date: 11 April 1997
- Running time: 171 minutes
- Country: India
- Language: Hindi
- Budget: ₹7.5 crore
- Box office: ₹32.43 crore

Ziddi (transl. Stubborn) is a 1997 Indian action film directed by Guddu Dhanoa, starring Sunny Deol, Raveena Tandon, Anupam Kher, Raj Babbar and Ashish Vidyarthi. It follows a short-tempered and stubborn Deva, who is feared because of his ruthless ways and severe punishment to the local hoodlums and later vows to avenge the death of his siblings.

It went on to become one of the biggest Bollywood hits of 1997, grossing Rs 324.3 million (US$5.7 million) at the box office. The film was remade in Tamil as Dharma, starring Vijayakanth. This is the second time Vijayakanth reprised Sunny Deol's role after Ghayal (1990) remake titled Bharathan (1992).

== Plot ==
Deva, an angry young man, lives with his father, Advocate Ashok Pradhan, mother Gayatri, brother Akash, and sister Guddi. He is greatly vigilant about the well-being of his family – an intrinsic reason for his fury and stubbornness. One day a man named Vilas tries to molest Guddi and forcefully grabs her hand. Deva, in a fit of extreme rage, rips off the hand of the man. Deva is arrested, and is sent to jail for 4 years.

After his liberation from jail, Deva along with his henchmen form a tribunal of justice called "Deva Ki Adaalat", where he punishes the evil-doers, mostly the tyrants over the poor. Soon, Deva's name is filed as one of the top four criminals of the city, the other three being Jindaal, Laal Singh, and Khan. These three men are in an effort to do away with Deva, who acts as an impediment to their illegal activities. ACP Inder Saxena has a genial relationship with Deva and his family, but is secretly planning to apprehend and punish him. Concurrently, a club dancer Jaya falls for Deva.

In due course of time, Inder marries Guddi. One day, Akash stops at a building under construction erected by "Laal Builders" to deliver some goods. Incidentally, at the top floor of the building he eavesdrops on the three crime bosses – Jindaal, Laal Singh and Khan devising an evil plot to kill the Chief Minister and frame Deva for the murder. In a great panic, Akash flees from the spot but in his haste, he drops the cap of his pen on which the name "AKASH" is engraved. He reports this dreadful plot to Inder by phone after a failed attempt to call Deva. Inder arrives shortly and both of them walk up to the top of the building where the three men are abetting. Inder retains the pen-cap (which Akash dropped behind) and after an onslaught on Akash by Jindaal, Laal Singh and Khan, Inder slays Akash by throwing him off the building to avenge the death of his brother Vilas, whose hand Deva ripped off.

One day, the Chief Minister comes to meet Deva after the latter convenes him for a private meeting. Jindaal bursts onto the scene, before Deva arrives and fires at the CM in a lethal attempt to assassinate him. However, Deva turns up in time and carries the acutely wounded CM to a safe location. A search operation is launched for Deva by the police. Deva kills Laal Singh in a heavy blood-shedding route.

Inder's wife Guddi comes across Akash's pen-cap inside a drawer at their home, which leads her to learn with shock and horror that Inder killed Akash. She rings up Deva, but before she utters the truth, Inder arrives with Jindaal, and Khan and detaches the telephone cord. The three men assault Guddi before Inder stabs her to death.

Eventually, Deva tracks down Khan as one of the killers of his brother and kills him by stabbing Khan to death. Later, Deva finds Akash's pen-cap among Guddi's mortal remains. Deva now knows that Inder has joined hands with Jindal. A squad of policemen led by Inder besieges Deva's refuge. Jindaal arrives at the spot to kill the CM who is under vital medical treatment in Deva's shelter. Angered by this, Deva and his bleeding men with the help of the local residents annihilate the armed force. He kills Jindaal when the latter tries to fire at the CM, and beats up Inder. Finally, Deva's father Ashok Pradhan arrives and shoots Inder to death.

"Jaanwar ko maarne ke liye jaanwar banna padta hai" (To kill a beast, one has to become a beast) – the honest advocate upholds. In the final scene, the CM asserts Deva's innocence. Deva is sentenced to seven years in jail.

== Cast ==
- Sunny Deol as Deva Pradhan
- Raveena Tandon as Jaya Pradhan – Deva’s girlfriend, later wife.
- Raj Babbar as Jindaal, the main antagonist.
- Anupam Kher as Advocate Ashok Pradhan, Deva’s father.
- Ashish Vidyarthi as ACP Inder Saxena – Guddi's husband, Deva’s brother-in-law.
- Shahbaz Khan as Lal Singh, Jindaal’s associate
- Sharat Saxena as Khan, Jindaal’s associate
- Sachin Khedekar as Akash Pradhan, Deva and Guddi’s elder brother.
- Farida Jalal as Kamla, Jaya’s mother.
- Beena Banerjee as Gayatri Pradhan – Ashok’s wife, Deva’s mother.
- Richa Ahuja as Guddi Pradhan Saxena, Deva's younger sister.
- Virendra Saxena as Chief Minister of Maharashtra Bhagwat Choudhary
- Mushtaq Khan as Parvez , Lal Singh's henchman
- Dhananjay Manjrekar as Sharma , Deva's associate

== Box office ==
Ziddi was a super hit at the box office, with a collection of Rs 324.3 million. The songs were well-received, with the dandy number "Mera Dil Le Gayi Oye" becoming extremely popular.

== Music and soundtrack ==
Ziddi

Soundtrack album by Dilip Sen–Sameer Sen
- Released: February 1997
- Recorded: 1996–1997
- Genres: Feature film soundtrack, filmi
- Length: 38:33
- Language: Hindi
- Label: Vatsa Music
- Producer: Dilip Sen–Sameer Sen

The music for the songs of the film was composed by Dilip Sen–Sameer Sen The lyrics of the songs were penned by Sameer. The background score of the movie was done by Surinder Sodhi.

The album has seven songs in the vocals of Hariharan, K. S. Chithra, Udit Narayan, Kumar Sanu, Shweta Shetty and Alka Yagnik. Besides "Mera Dil Le Gayi Oye" with Punjabi dash and touch, the song "Hum Tumse Na Kuch Keh Paaye" became popular as a soft romantic ballad. The other popular song, "Mera Dil Le Gayi Oye" also known as "Kammo" is based on "Billo".

The Ziddi soundtrack album sold 2.2 million units in India, making it one of the year's top ten best-selling Bollywood soundtrack albums.

=== Track list ===
#	Title	Singer(s)
1.	"Kaale Kaale Baal"	Shweta Shetty
2.	"Mera Dil Le Gayee"	Lalit Sen
3.	"Hum Tumse Na Kuchh"	Hariharan, K. S. Chithra
4.	"O Haseena"	Kumar Sanu, K. S. Chithra
5.	"Aji Suno Suno"	Udit Narayan, K. S. Chithra
6.	"Hum Mile Tum Mile"	Udit Narayan, Alka Yagnik
7.	"Hum Tumse Na Kuchh II"	Hariharan

== Awards and nominations ==
- Nominated – Zee Cine Awards for Best Performance in a Negative Role – Ashish Vidyarthi
