= Shweta Shetty =

Indian-German pop singer (born 1969)

- Born: Shweta Shetty; 1969; Bombay, Maharashtra, India
- Other name: Shwetaa
- Citizenship: Germany
- Occupation: Singer
- Years active: 1990–present
- Spouse: Clemens Brandt (m. 1997)
- Musical career
- Genres: Pop, Indipop
- Instrument: Vocals
- Labels: Sony Music; Universal Music Group

Shweta Shetty (also known as Shwetaa in nickname) is an Indian-born German pop singer known for her albums and for her contributions to Bollywood film soundtracks.

== Life and career ==
Shetty's album, Johnny Joker, was a success. She was awarded the Best Female Pop Artist for her work in the album Deewane To Deewane Hain at the 1998 Screen Awards.

In 1997, Shetty married a German man, Clemens Brandt, and moved to Hamburg. They divorced five years later, but it wasn't until 2015 when Shetty eventually moved back to India. Shetty is a German citizen but also holds an Overseas Citizenship of India.

She is cousin of Indian actresses Shilpa Shetty and Shamita Shetty.

Shetty launched a brand new single Daro Na feat. Delhi based Music Producer Addy S during the pandemic which was shot and edited at home while in lockdown.

In 2021, Shetty launched a remix of original song jalne mein hai mazza (1993) by salim-suleman with House music producer Addy S on Sony music India. the video was shot in goa and was very well received by the audience and critics alike as a 90s disco revivalist number.

== Discography ==
=== Studio albums ===
Year	Album details	Track list
1990	Shweta - The Album: Label: Unknown; Format: Cassette	
1991	Lambada: Label: Unknown; Format: Cassette	
1993	Johnny Joker: Label: Magnasound; Format: Cassette, CD, Digital Download; Composer(s): Biddu; Lyricist(s):	1. "Johnny Joker"; 2. "Aaja Naye"; 3. "Bewafa"; 4. "Mr. Gentleman"; 5. "Chaand"; 6. "Pyaar Hai"; 7. "Jaano"; 8. "Main Khoi Jaane"
1995	Shweta – The New Album: Release Date: Audio Cassette; 18 January 1995 (India); 9 March 1995 (Canada); 14 July 1995 (Europe); Audio CD; 27 September 1995 (India, Europe, Canada, USA, Japan); 29 September 1995 (Australia); Label: Magnasound; Format: Cassette, CD, Digital Download; Composer(s): Salim–Sulaiman (Track 1 to 8) AR Rahman (Track 9) Biddu (Track 10 and 11) Jawahar Wattal (Track 12); Co-artist(s): Shaan (Track 5) Sagarika (Track 6) Baba Sehgal (Track 9)	Standard Edition (Only Cassette) Tracklist: 1. "Bekaarar"; 2. "Kaisi Hai Zindagi"; 3. "Jhoothe"; 4. "Dil Ki Gaadi"; 5. "Silsile"; 6. "Jalne Main Hai Mazza"; 7. "Aa Chori Chori"; 8. "Le Lo Dil"; Bonus Track/Other Hits Edition (Only CD) Tracklist: 1. "Bekaarar"; 2. "Kaisi Hai Zindagi"; 3. "Jhoothe"; 4. "Dil Ki Gaadi"; 5. "Silsile"; 6. "Jalne Main Hai Mazza"; 7. "Aa Chori Chori"; 8. "Le Lo Dil"; 9. "Rukumani Rukumani"; 10. "Johnny Jokers"; 11. "Made in India"; 12. "Bolo Ta Ra Ra"
1998	Deewane To Deewane Hai: Release Date: 10 January 1998; Label: Magnasound; Format: Cassette, CD, Digital Download	
1999	Dil La Ley: Release Date: February 1999; Label: Magnasound; Format: Cassette, CD, Digital Download	
2003	Saajna: Release Date: April 2003 (USA, Germany); May 2003 (UK, France, Italy, Spain); September 2003 (India, Pakistan, Bangladesh); November 2003 (UAE, China, Japan, Australia); Label: Universal Music Group; Format: Cassette, CD, Digital Download	

=== Soundtracks ===
- "Rukmani Rukmani" from Roja (1992)
- "Mangta Hai Kya" from Rangeela (1995)
- "Kaale Kaale Baal" from Ziddi (1997)
- "Main Deewani Main Mastani" from Bandhan (1998)
- "Tote Tote Ho Gaya" from Bichhoo (2000)
- "Lambo" from cancelled video game Lamborghini (2003)
- "Dilli Ki Sardi" from Zameen (2003)

=== Singles ===
- Daro Na feat. Addy S (2020)
- Jalne Mein Hain Mazaa (Addy S Version) ( 2021)

=== Collaborations ===
Gayatri Mantra (Celestial Yoga Version) by Shweta Shetty, Mihir Chandan, Madoc, C-Deep (2022) Gayatri Mantra (Acoustic Version) by Shweta Shetty, Mihir Chandan, Madoc, C-Deep (2022)
