= Vijay Kumar Arora =

Indian filmmaker

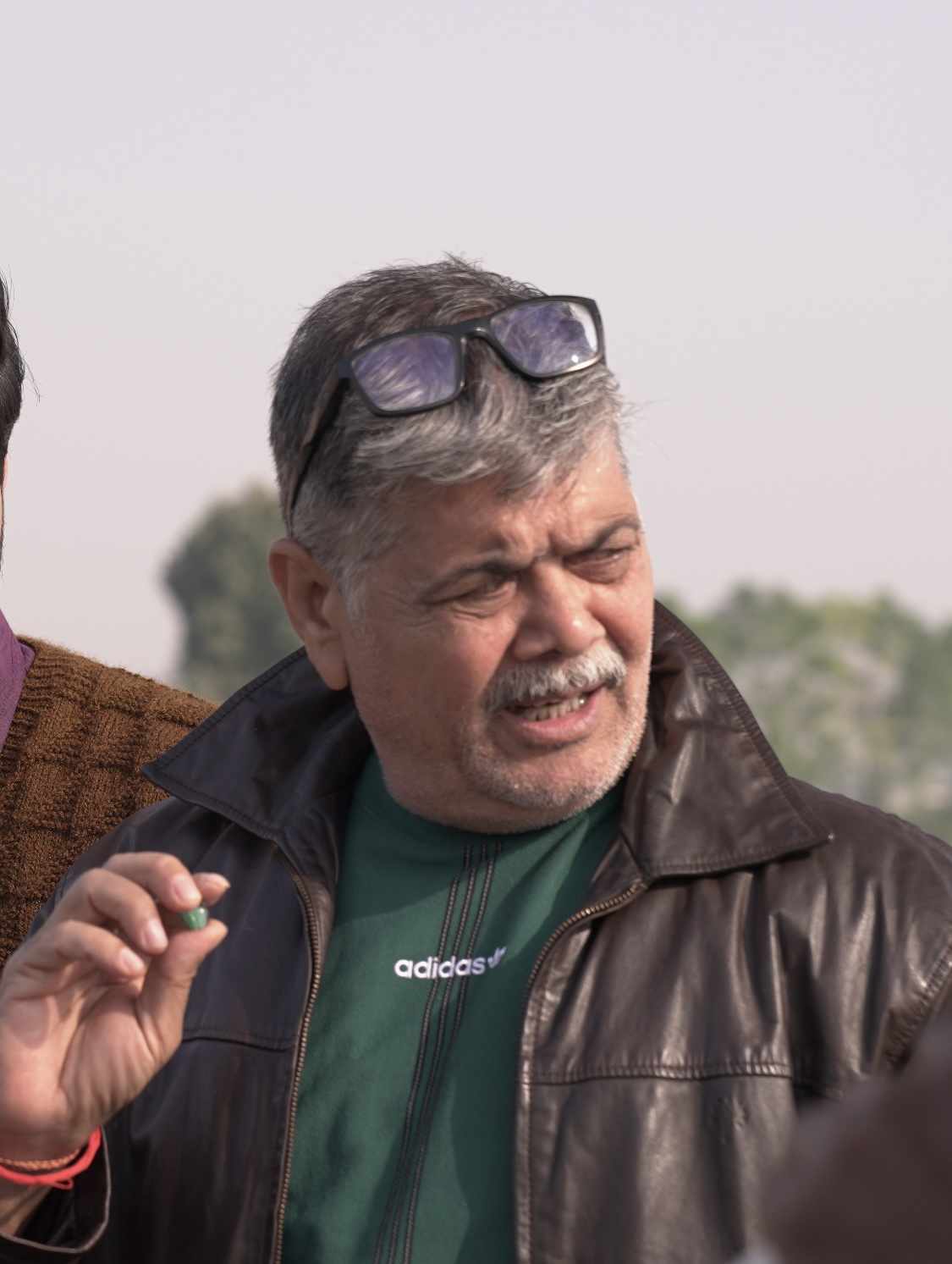
- Born: Amritsar, Punjab, India
- Other names: Daddu
- Occupations: Film director and cinematographer
- Years active: 1990s–present

Vijay Kumar Arora, also known as Daddu, is an Indian filmmaker and cinematographer who predominantly works in the Hindi and Punjabi film industries. As a cinematographer, he is known for his collaborations with Mahesh Manjrekar, Anubhav Sinha, and Remo D'Souza.

For his work as a filmmaker, he was awarded the 66th National Film Award for Best Punjabi Feature Film for Harjeeta. His other directorial Punjabi film, Guddiyan Patole, earned him a nomination for Best Director at the PTC Punjabi Film Awards in 2020. The film went on to win the Jury's Choice Award for Best Film at the 10th PTC Punjabi Film Awards in 2020.

== Early life and career ==
Arora began his career in the late 1990s and worked as a cinematographer on Hindi films such as Vaastav: The Reality (1999), Kurukshetra (2000), Tum Bin (2001), Pyaar Kiya Nahin Jaata (2003), Dhamaal (2007), and ABCD (2013). His later cinematographic work includes Any Body Can Dance 2 (2015), A Flying Jatt (2016), and Street Dancer 3D (2020). He also worked on television projects, including Hasratein, Sea Hawks, Hum Bombay Nahi Jayenge, and Shikast.

In the early 2010s, Arora made his directorial debut with the Punjabi film Ronde Sare Vyah Picho (2013), starring Neeru Bajwa. He went on to direct films such as Harjeeta (2018), which won the National Film Award for Best Feature Film in Punjabi, Guddiyan Patole (2019), Kali Jotta (2023), and Godday Godday Chaa (2023).

Arora has also directed music videos for artists such as Gippy Grewal, Mika Singh, B Praak, Raftaar, and Badshah, in collaboration with T-Series, and for Sonu Nigam's album Deewana.

== Filmography ==
=== As cinematographer ===
Year	Film	Language	Notes
1995	Aai	Marathi	Debut
1999	Vaastav: The Reality	Hindi	
2000	Jungle	Hindi	
2000	Nidaan	Hindi	
2000	Astitva	Marathi; Hindi	
2000	Kurukshetra	Hindi	
2001	Tum Bin	Hindi	
2001	Tera Mera Saath Rahen	Hindi	
2001	Ehsaas: The Feeling	Hindi	
2002	Pitaah	Hindi	
2002	Hathyar	Hindi	
2003	Pyaar Kiya Nahin Jaata	Hindi	
2003	Aapko Pehle Bhi Kahin Dekha Hai	Hindi	
2004	Rakht	Hindi	
2005	Padmashree Laloo Prasad Yadav	Hindi	
2005	Dus	Hindi	
2005	It Was Raining That Night	Hindi	
2005	Viruddh	Hindi	
2005	Vaah! Life Ho Toh Aisi!	Hindi	
2006	Naksha	Hindi	
2007	Deha	Hindi	
2007	Dhamaal	Hindi	
2008	Love Story 2050	Hindi	
2009	Do Knot Disturb	Hindi	
2011	F.A.L.T.U	Hindi	
2013	ABCD: Anybody Can Dance	Hindi	
2014	Action Jackson	Hindi	
2015	ABCD 2	Hindi	
2016	A Flying Jatt	Hindi	
2018	Nawabzaade	Hindi	
2018	Mohalla Assi	Hindi	
2020	Street Dancer 3D	Hindi	
2025	Be Happy	Hindi	

=== As director ===
- Ronde Sare Vyah Picho (2013)
- Harjeeta (2018)
- Guddiyan Patole (2019)
- Kali Jotta (2023)
- Godday Godday Chaa (2023)
- Son of Sardaar 2 (2025)

== Awards and nominations ==
Year	Award	Category	Film	Result	Ref.
2018	National Film Awards	Best Punjabi Feature film	Harjeeta	Won	
2018	PTC Punjabi Film Awards	Best Director	Harjeeta	Nominated	
2019	PTC Punjabi Film Awards	Best Director	Guddiyan Patole	Nominated	
2025	National Film Awards	Best Punjabi Feature film	Godday Godday Chaa	Won	
