= Kishore Nandlaskar =

Indian actor (Born 1940 - Died 2021)

- Born: Kishore Nandlaskar; 1940; Bombay, Bombay Presidency, British India
- Died: 20 April 2021 (aged 80–81); Thane, Maharashtra, India
- Occupations: Actor, Theatre artist

Kishore Nandlaskar (1940 – 20 April 2021) was an Indian actor, who is noted for his work in Hindi and Marathi films. He made his debut as an actor in the Marathi cinema with the 1989's film Ina Mina Dika. He is best known for e Khakee (2004), Vaastav: The Reality (1999), Singham (2011), Simmba, Miss U Miss, Gaon Thor Pudhari Chor and Are Soda Batali Bai.

He died of COVID-19 on 20 April 2021.

== Early life and career ==
Nandlaskar's native village is Shejawali in Kharepatan taluka, Maharashtra. He spent his childhood in Lamington Road, Nagpada, and Ghatkopar areas of Mumbai. He attended New Era High School and Union High School.

He performed plays like Vitthal Farari, Natheetun Marla Teer, Sundara Manamdhe Bharli by folk drama writer Sharad Niphadkar. Around the same time, in 1980, he participated in Doordarshan's Gajra, Natak and other programs.

Nandlaskar had acted in about 40 plays, more than 25 Marathi and Hindi films and more than 20 series. ‘Nana Karte Pyaar’ was his last play in commercial theatre. Sare Sajjan, Shejari Shejari, Halad Rusli Kunku Hasle and a few other films are credited to his name. On the commercial stage, Nandlaskar made the audience laugh with his plays like Chal Atap Jalve, Bhramacha Bhopala, Pahuna, Shriman Shrimati, Bhole Dambis and One Room Kitchen.

== Filmography ==
- 2020 - Miss U Miss
- 2019 - Stepney
- 2019 - Perfume
- 2019 - Dhadpad
- 2018 - Pakda Pakdi
- 2018 - Simmba
- 2017 - Bhavishyachi Aishi Taishi: The Prediction
- 2017 - Gaon Thor Pudhari Chor
- 2014 - Madhyamvarg: The Middle Class
- 2014 - Are Soda Batali Bai
- 2013 - Mandali Tumchyasathi Kay Pan
- 2013 - Tatya Vinchu Lage Raho
- 2013 - Kutha Bolu Naka
- 2012 - Yedyanchi Jatra
- 2011 - Aajoba Vayat Aale
- 2011 - Shabri
- 2011 - Ashi Fasli Nanachi Tang
- 2011 - Singham
- 2011 - Swargacha Visa
- 2010 - Most Wanted
- 2010 - Dus Tola
- 2010 - Tum Milo Toh Sahi
- 2010 - Kurukshetra
- 2010 - Kalshekar Aahet Ka?
- 2010 - Ek Shodh
- 2010 - Gosht Lagna Nantarchi
- 2009 - Lonavala Bypass
- 2009 - Sanam Hum Aapke Hain...
- 2009 - Nasheebachi Aishi Taishi
- 2009 - Fruit and Nut
- 2009 - Love Kaa Taddka
- 2009 - Hello! Gandhe Sir
- 2008 - Dasvidaniya
- 2007 - Mumbaiche Shahne
- 2007 - Soon Majhi Bhagyachi
- 2007 - Dumkata
- 2006 - Ishhya
- 2006 - Lalbaugcha Raja
- 2006 - London Cha Jawai
- 2005 - Thaiman
- 2005 - Munnabhai S.S.C
- 2005 - Chakachak
- 2005 - Chalta Hai Yaar
- 2004 - Khakee
- 2003 - Baap Ka Baap
- 2003 - Pran Jaaye Par Shaan Na Jaaye
- 2002 - Aadharstambh
- 2002 - Be-Lagaam
- 2002 - Hathyar
- 2001 - Ehsaas: The Feeling
- 2001 - Yeh Teraa Ghar Yeh Meraa Ghar
- 2000 - Jis Desh Mein Ganga Rehta Hain
- 2000 - Astitva
- 1999 - Dhandgad Dhinga
- 1999 - Rang Premacha
- 1999 - Vaastav: The Reality
- 1998 - Paij Lagnachi
- 1997 - Yeshwant
- 1997 - Tyag
- 1997 - Purna Satya
- 1995 - Jamla Ho Jamla
- 1994 - Akka
- 1994 - Bajrangachi Kamaal
- 1994 - Vishwavinayak
- 1993 - Lapandav
- 1993 - Garam Masala
- 1993 - Sarech Sajjan
- 1993 - Wajva Re Wajva
- 1993 - Bedardi
- 1993 - Karamati Coat
- 1992 - Gruhpravesh
- 1991 - Doctor Doctor
- 1991 - Shame to Shame
- 1991 - Yeda Ki Khula
- 1991 - Halad Rusli Kunku Hasla
- 1991 - Shejari Shejari
- 1990 - Dhamal Bablya Ganpyachi
- 1990 - Kuthe Kuthe Shodu Mi Tila
- 1989 - Chambu Gabale
- 1989 - Dharla Tar Chavtay
- 1989 - Hamaal De Dhamaal
- 1989 - Ina Mina Dika
- 1989 -Thartharat
- 1989 - Pasant Ahe Mulgi Sahebrao
- 1982 - Navare Sagle Gadhav

== Television ==
- 2019 - Koparkhali
- 2019 - Zhale Mokale Aakash
- 1999 - Stars Bestsellers: Anand'
- 1990 - Bhikaji Rao Karodpati
- 1990 - Nasti Aafat

== Death ==
Nandlaskar died of COVID-19 on 20 April 2021, at a COVID centre in Thane, Maharashtra.

== See also ==
- List of Marathi film actors
- List of Hindi film actors
