= Reema Lagoo =

Indian actress (1958–2017)

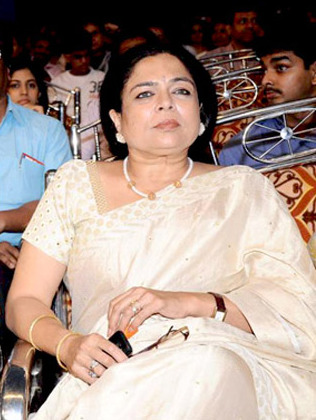
- Lagoo in May 2011
- Born: Nayan Bhadbhade; 21 June 1958; Bombay, Bombay State, India (now Mumbai)
- Died: 18 May 2017 (aged 58); Mumbai, Maharashtra, India
- Other name: Rima
- Occupation: Actress
- Years active: 1964–2017
- Spouse: Vivek Lagoo (m. 1978, separated)
- Children: 1

Reema Lagoo (born Nayan Bhadbhade; 21 June 1958 – 18 May 2017) was an Indian theatre and screen actress known for her work in Hindi and Marathi cinema. She began her acting career in the Marathi theatre, after which she became a household name for playing motherly roles in the 1990s and early 2000s. She gained widespread attention after her roles in the 90s classic TV sitcoms Shriman Shrimati (as Kokila Kulkarni) and Tu Tu Main Main (as Devaki Verma).

== Career ==
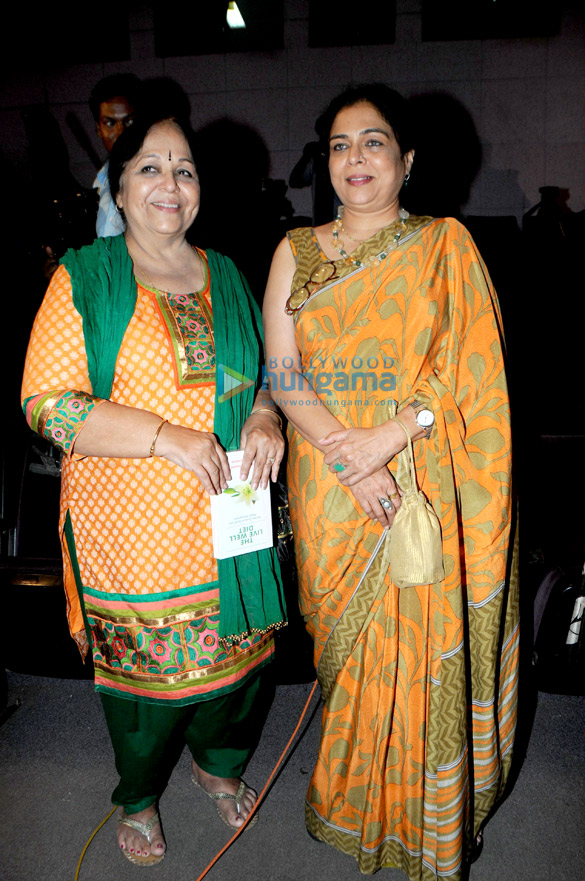
Lagoo with Rohini Hattangadi.

Lagoo's career as an actor began as a child, influenced by her mother, who was a Marathi stage and film actress. She appeared in five films including Masterji, directed by Durga Khote. Her senior career continued in Marathi stage after a long gap following work as a child artiste. It began with her coming to Mumbai and appearing in P. L. Deshpande's play, an adaptation of My Fair Lady. However, she received wider recognition with roles in television serials, Hindi and Marathi films. She debuted in films in 1979 with the Marathi film Sinhasan.

=== Hindi films ===
She went on to play supporting roles with some of the biggest names in the Hindi film industry, mostly as the mother of the lead characters. She first rose to prominence with the Hindi film Qayamat Se Qayamat Tak (1988) where she played Juhi Chawla's mother. She was seen in a controversial role in Aruna Raje's Rihaee (1988). She then starred in the blockbuster film Maine Pyar Kiya (1989) as Salman Khan's mother and then in Saajan (1991), also a superhit success at the box office. She starred in action drama and crime thriller Gumrah (1993) as Sridevi's mother, Jai Kishen (1994) as Akshay Kumar's mother and Rangeela (1995) as Urmila Matondkar's mother. Her Gumrah (1993) was seventh-highest grosser of the year at the box office, Jai Kishen (1994) was a commercial success (declared 'semihit'). Rangeela (1995) was highest grosser of the year at the box office.

Most prominently, she has starred in some of the biggest hits in the Bollywood industry including the Hum Aapke Hain Koun..! (1994), Yeh Dillagi (1994), Dilwale (1994), Rangeela (1995), Kuch Kuch Hota Hai (1998), Kal Ho Naa Ho (2003), Hum Saath-Saath Hain (1999) Vaastav: The Reality (1999) In this role that earned her a fourth Filmfare Award nomination for best supporting actress, Lagoo played the mother of a gangster played by Sanjay Dutt. She has been credited in the media as a coming of a "new-age mother" in Hindi cinema.

Though mostly playing a middle-aged mother in films, she has also played other roles earlier in her career. She played the role of a dancer in Aakrosh (1980) and a cold-hearted businesswoman in Yeh Dillagi (1994).

=== Marathi films ===
Lagoo also had a notable presence in Marathi cinema. She was awarded the Maharashtra State Film Award for Best Actress for her performance in the 2002 film Reshamgaath. Her role in Janma (2011), which she referred to as "one of the best roles in her career", received praise. Recognising her contribution to Marathi cinema, she was awarded the V Shantaram Award by the Government of Maharashtra.

=== Television ===
Lagoo also had a fairly successful career as a television actor in both Hindi and Marathi languages. She debuted on television in 1985 with the Hindi series Khandaan. Her roles in Shriman Shrimati as Kokila Kulkarni and as Devaki Verma starring opposite Supriya Pilgaonkar in Tu Tu Main Main were her most successful shows, with the latter winning her the Indian Telly Award for Best Actress in a Comic Role.

Lagoo has appeared on the Marathi show Maanacha Muzra, which honours Marathi personalities.

== Personal life ==
Reema Lagoo was born on 21 June 1958 as Nayan Bhadbhade. Her mother was Marathi stage actress Mandakini Bhadbhade famed for the drama Lekure udand Jaahalee. Lagoo's acting abilities were noted when she was a student at the Huzurpaga HHCP High School in Pune. She took to acting professionally after completing her secondary education. Starting 1979, she was employed with Union Bank of India for ten years in Bombay (now Mumbai), when, alongside appearances in television and films, she participated in the inter-bank cultural events.

She met Vivek Lagoo (1953—2025), her future colleague in the bank and stage actor, in 1976 and married him in 1978. Upon marriage, she adopted the name Reema Lagoo. Described by Vivek as "an understanding to restructure our lives", they separated later. The couple's daughter Mrunmayee Lagoo is also an actress and theatre director.

== Death ==
Lagoo had been shooting for the television series Naamkarann till 7 p.m. (IST) on 17 May 2017. After she complained of chest pain later that night, she was taken to Kokilaben Dhirubhai Ambani Hospital in Mumbai at 1 a.m. (IST). She died at 3:15 a.m. (IST) from cardiac arrest. At the time of death, she was described as being "perfectly fine" and having "no health issues". Her funeral was performed by her daughter Mrunmayee in Oshiwara crematorium, in Mumbai.

== Filmography ==
=== Films ===
List of films and roles
Year	Title	Role	Language	Notes
1963	Ha Maza Marg Ekala	Nayan	Marathi	Child artist
1964	Masterji		Marathi	
1979	Sinhasan	Kamal Dabhade	Marathi	
1979	Javayachi Jaat	Sujata's friend	Marathi	
1980	Darodekhor	Sita	Marathi	
1980	Aakrosh	Lavani Dancer	Hindi	
1980	Kalyug	Kiran	Hindi	
1981	Nanad Bhavjay	Nanad	Marathi	
1981	Are Sansar Sansar	Hausa Desai	Marathi	
1983	Chatpati	Chatpati's friend	Hindi	
1985	Nasoor	Manjula Mohite	Hindi	
1986	Mazhe Ghar Mazha Sansar	Sindhutai Sane	Marathi	
1987	Antarpat	Kunda		
1988	Hamara Khandaan	Dr. Julie	Hindi	
1988	Qayamat Se Qayamat Tak	Kamla Singh	Hindi	
1988	Rihaee	Teekhibai	Hindi	
1989	Maine Pyar Kiya	Kaushalya Choudhary	Hindi	Nominated – Filmfare Award for Best Supporting Actress
1990	Police Public	Servant	Hindi	
1990	Aashiqui	Mrs. Vikram Roy	Hindi	Nominated – Filmfare Award for Best Supporting Actress
1990	Pratibandh	Judge	Hindi	
1990	Teri Talash Mein		Hindi	
1991	Balidaan	Sharda V. Gyanoba	Marathi	
1991	Ramwati	Laxmi Arjun Singh	Hindi	
1991	Henna	Chandni's mother	Hindi	
1991	Baharon Ke Manzil	Reema	Hindi	
1991	Saajan	Kamala Verma	Hindi	
1991	Pyar Bhara Dil	Sudha Sunderlal	Hindi	
1991	Patthar Ke Phool	Meera Verma	Hindi	
1991	First Love Letter	Shyam's mother	Hindi	
1991	Aag Laga Do Sawan Ko		Hindi	
	Chaukat Raja	School Director	Marathi	Cameo appearance
1992	Sapne Sajan Ke	Deepak's Mother	Hindi	
1992	Prem Deewane	Sumitra Singh	Hindi	
1992	Jiwalagaa	Resham's Mother	Hindi	
1992	Jeena Marna Tere Sang	Dr. Lakshmi Khurana	Hindi	Guest appearance
1992	Shola Aur Shabnam	Sharda Thapa	Hindi	
1992	Vansh	Rukmani K. Dharmadhikari	Hindi	
1992	Qaid Mein Hai Bulbul	Guddo Choudhry	Hindi	
1992	Do Hanso Ka Joda	Radha	Hindi	
1992	Nishchaiy	Yashoda Gujral	Hindi	
1992	Parda Hai Parda	Andrew's mother	Hindi	
1992	Sapne Sajan Ke	Deepak's mother	Hindi	
1992	Prem Deewane	Sumitra Singh	Hindi	
1992	Jiwalagaa	Resham's Mother	Marathi	
	Aapli Mansa	Janaki	Marathi	
1993	Shreemaan Aashique	Suman Mehra	Hindi	
1993	Sangram	Mrs. Rana	Hindi	
1993	Mahakaal	Anita's Mother	Hindi	
1993	Aaj Kie Aurat	Shanta Patil	Hindi	
1993	Gumrah	Sharda Chadha	Hindi	
1993	Dil Hai Betaab	Raja's mother	Hindi	
1993	Pyaar Ka Tarana	Reema	Hindi	
1994	Zamane Se Kya Darna	Shalini 'Shalu' Singh	Hindi	
1994	Yeh Dillagi	Mrs.Shanti Saigal	Hindi	
1994	Dilwale	Arun's mother	Hindi	
1994	Pathreela Raasta	Kamla	Hindi	
1994	Hum Aapke Hain Koun..!	Mrs. Madhukala Choudhury	Hindi	Nominated – Filmfare Award for Best Supporting Actress
1994	Vijaypath	Mrs. Saxena	Hindi	
1994	Kanoon	Pankaj 's wife	Hindi	
1995	Jai Vikraanta	Sharda Singh	Hindi	
1995	Naajayaz	Mili's mother	Hindi	
1995	Rangeela	Naina Bakshi	Hindi	
1995	Taqdeerwala	Suraj's mother	Hindi	
1996	Apne Dam Par	Mrs. Saxena	Hindi	
1996	Vijeta	Mrs. Laxmi Prasad	Hindi	
1996	Papa Kehte Hai	Dadi	Hindi	
1996	Prem Granth	Parvati	Hindi	
1996	Maahir	Asha	Hindi	
1996	Dil Tera Diwana	Kumar's wife	Hindi	
1997	Uff! Yeh Mohabbat	Raja's Mother	Hindi	
1997	Rui Ka Bojh	Bahu	Hindi	
1997	Dil Kitna Nadan Hai	Neelam Khurana	Hindi	
1997	Judwaa	Prem Malhotra's mother	Hindi	
1997	Yes Boss	Rahul Joshi's mother	Hindi	
1997	Betaabi	Sameer's mother	Hindi	
1997	Deewana Mastana	Bunnu's mother	Hindi	
1997	Suraj	Gayatri	Hindi	
1998	Tirchhi Topiwale	Sumitra Oberoi	Hindi	
1998	Pyaar To Hona Hi Tha	Shekhar's sister-in-law	Hindi	
1998	Mere Do Anmol Ratan	Suman	Hindi	
1998	Deewana Hoon Pagal Nahi	Sharada	Hindi	
1998	Aunty No. 1	Vijayalaxmi	Hindi	
1998	Kuch Kuch Hota Hai	Anjali's mother	Hindi	
1998	Jhooth Bole Kauwa Kaate	Savitri Abhyankar	Hindi	
1999	Hum Saath-Saath Hain	Mamta	Hindi	
1999	Bindhaast	Aasawari Patwardhan	Marathi	
1999	Aarzoo	Parvati	Hindi	
1999	Vaastav: The Reality	Shanta	Hindi	Nominated – Filmfare Award for Best Supporting Actress
1999	Dillagi	Shalini's Mother	Hindi	
2000	Nidaan	Suhasini Nadkarni	Hindi	
2000	Deewane	Vishal's Mother	Hindi	
2000	Jis Desh Mein Ganga Rehta Hain	Laxmi	Hindi	
2000	Kahin Pyaar Na Ho Jaaye	Mrs. Sharma	Hindi	
2001	Hum Deewane Pyar Ke	Mrs. Chatterjee	Hindi	
2001	Censor	Mother in the film	Hindi	Cameo appearance
2001	Indian	Mrs. Suryapratap Singh	Hindi	
2001	Tera Mera Saath Rahen	Janki Gupta	Hindi	
2002	Hathyar	Shanta	Hindi	
2002	Reshamgaath	Anna Smith	Hindi	Maharashtra State Film Award for Best Actress
2003	Kavtya Mahakaal	Unnamed	Hindi	Cameo appearance
2003	Pran Jaye Par Shaan Na Jaye	Reema	Hindi	
2003	Main Prem Ki Diwani Hoon	Prem Kumar's mother	Hindi	
2003	Chupke Se	Laxmi Timghure	Hindi	
2003	Kal Ho Naa Ho	Namrata Mathur	Hindi	
2004	AK-47	Rudra's Mother	Hindi	
2004	Hatya	Mrs. R. Lal	Hindi	
2005	Navra Maza Navsacha	Politician	Marathi	Special appearance
2005	Koi Mere Dil Mein Hai	Mrs. Vikram Malhotra	Hindi	
2005	Hum Tum Aur Mom	Mom	Hindi	
2005	Shaadi Karke Phas Gaya Yaar	Ayaan's Mother	Hindi	
2005	Sandwich	MRS. Singh, Shekhar's mother	Hindi	
2005	Divorce: Not Between Husband and Wife	Judge	Hindi	
2006	Aai Shappath	Devki Desai	Marathi	
2006	Shubh Mangal Savdhan	Komal Mulgaonkar	Marathi	
2007	Deha	Piloo	Hindi	
2007	Savalee	Ramabai Shirodkar	Marathi	
2008	Humne Jeena Seekh Liya	Mrs. Joshi	Hindi	
2008	Superstar	Kusum P. Saxena	Hindi	
2008	Mehbooba	Queen Mother (Ma'sa)	Hindi	
2008	Kidnap	Sonia's grandmother	Hindi	
2009	Me Shivajiraje Bhosale Boltoy	Jijabai	Marathi	
2009	Agnidivya	Nandini's Mother	Marathi	
2009	Aamras	Indumati	Marathi	
2009	Gho Mala Asala Hawa	Dagdubai	Marathi	
2010	Mittal v/s Mittal	Mitali's mother	Hindi	
2011	Janma	Vandhana Sarpotdar	Hindi	
2011	Mumbai Cutting		Hindi	
2011	Trapped in Tradition: Rivaaz	Ranjeet Singh's wife	Hindi	
2011	Dhoosar		Marathi	
2012	Om Allah	Aushim's Mother	Hindi	
2012	498A: The Wedding Gift	Sudha Patel	Hindi	
2013	Mahabharat	Gandhari	Hindi	Voice Role Animated Film
2013	Anumati	Ambu	Marathi	
2013	Yeda	Sadhana Narvekar	Marathi	
2014	Ungli	Nikhil's mother	Hindi	
2015	Main Hoon Rajinikanth	Herself	Hindi	
2015	I Love NY	Tikku Verma's adopted mother	Hindi	Cameo appearance
2015	Katyar Kaljat Ghusali	Katyar	Marathi	voice-over
2016	Jaundya Na Balasaheb	Aaisaheb	Marathi	
2017	Deva	Shalini	Marathi	
2018	Home Sweet Home	Home-Minster	Marathi	

=== Television ===
List of television shows and roles
Year	Title	Role	Notes	Ref.
1985	Khandaan			
1988	Mahanagar			
1993	Kirdaar			
1994	Aasmaan Se Aagay			
1994–1999	Shrimaan Shrimati	Kokila Kulkarni		
1994–2000	Tu Tu Main Main	Devaki Verma / Madam X Saas ki duplicate	Indian Telly Award for Best Actress in a Comic Role	
1997–1999	Do Aur Do Paanch	Radha		
1999	Waqt Ki Raftar			
2002–2003	Dhadkan	Prajakta Marathe		
2006	Kadvee Khattee Meethi	Yashoda Verma		
2009	Do Hanson Ka Joda	Snehlata		
2012	Lakhon Mein Ek			
2013	Tuza Maza Jamena	Reema Limaye		
2016–2017	Naamkarann	Dayavanti Mehta	Final appearance	
2026	Yeh Prem Mol Liya		Posthumous Appearance	
