= Baaghi (2000 film) =

2000 film by Rajesh Kumar Singh

- Poster
- Directed by: Rajesh Kumar Singh
- Written by: Ikram Akhtar; Jalees Sherwani
- Produced by: Ramesh J. Sharma
- Starring: Sanjay Dutt; Manisha Koirala; Aditya Pancholi
- Cinematography: Sanjay Malwankar
- Edited by: Kuldeep Mehan
- Music by: Sajid–Wajid; Dilip Sen-Sameer Sen
- Distributed by: Triple Aar Films
- Release date: 7 April 2000
- Country: India
- Language: Hindi
- Budget: ₹5.75 crore
- Box office: ₹6.47 crore

Baaghi (transl. Rebel) is a 2000 Indian action drama film starring Sanjay Dutt, Manisha Koirala and Aditya Pancholi. The film is directed by Rajesh Kumar Singh and was released on 7 April 2000. It has been described as a remake of Robert De Niro's A Bronx Tale (1993).

== Plot ==
Raja is in love with a nightclub dancer, Rani. Rani gets Raja a job as a security guard in a hotel run by Vikram. Raja's life turns haywire when Manubhai falls for Rani and tries to get her at any cost. Rani, instead of falling prey to his lusty charms, prefers to kill herself. Raja then turns into a professional killer in Vikram's gang. Raja comes across Soorya (master Rohan), who idolizes him as his hero and even adopts his lifestyle. Soorya grows up and falls in love with Vikram's sister Kiran. Initially, Raja encourages Soorya, but when he learns that the girl is Kiran, he advises Soorya to relent, but in vain. Raja also tries to pacify Vikram, but in vain. Raja becomes a rebel with a cause, mainly to protect love. Raja tries to get Soorya and Kiran married but just after becoming husband and wife, Raja and Vikram kill each other. The movie ends with everybody crying for Raja and Vikram.

== Cast ==
- Sanjay Dutt as Raja
- Manisha Koirala as Rani
- Aditya Pancholi as Vikram
- Inder Kumar as Surya (Suryaprakash Vidyashankar Pandey)
- Tina Sen as Kiran (Vikram's sister Pinky)
- Shalini Kapoor Sagar as Vikram's wife
- Mohan Joshi as Assistant Commissioner of Police Kulkarni
- Gulshan Grover as Manmohan
- Shivaji Satam as Prof. Vidyashankar Pandey (Surya's father)
- Shama Deshpande as Sarika Pandey, Surya's mother
- Sanjay Narvekar as Chakku
- Mahesh Anand as Chhottey
- Tej Sapru as Randhir Kanojia
- Jack Gaud as Gogi Pathan
- Gavin Packard as Zandu Pathan
- Ankush Mohit as Rane
- Uday Tikekar as Satish
- Rana Jung Bahadur as Peter
- Dinesh Hingoo as Manuz, the drunkard
- Deepak Jethi as Hakeem Lukka
- Raj Babbar as Raj

== Soundtrack ==
Baaghi

Soundtrack album by Sajid–Wajid
- Released: 29 February 2000
- Genre: Feature film soundtrack
- Label: Venus Records & Tapes

Music: Sajid–Wajid | Lyrics: Faaiz Anwar

=== Track list ===
Song	Singer(s)
"Ek Kabhi Do Kabhi"	Kavita Krishnamurthi
"Khaai Hai Kasam"	Kumar Sanu, Kavita Krishnamurthi
"Piya Tu Kahaan Hai"	Shubha Mudgal
"Pyaar Pyaar"	Abhijeet, Jaspinder Narula
"Sapne Mein Kudi"	Abhijeet
"Tumhi Ko Chaahta Hai"	Kumar Sanu, Kavita Krishnamurthy
"Chaha Tha Tujhe"	Sonu Nigam, Sunidhi Chauhan

== Reception ==
A review in Sify, gave the film a three star rating, writing "BAAGHI, directed by Rajesh Kumar Singh suffers from an identity crisis. Is it a gangster film, is it a love story, is it about a possessive brother, or is it about lost innocence? And then should it not be Vaastav, Tezaab or Lawaaris? In the end it is all and with so many elements thrown in it flattens under its own pressure." Faisal Shariff of Rediff.com was critical of Tina Sen and Inder Kumar's acting.

According to the Indian film trade website Box Office India, the film was made on an estimated budget of ₹57.5 million (US$600,000) and had a worldwide gross of ₹64.8 million (US$680,000).
