= Rahul Ranade =

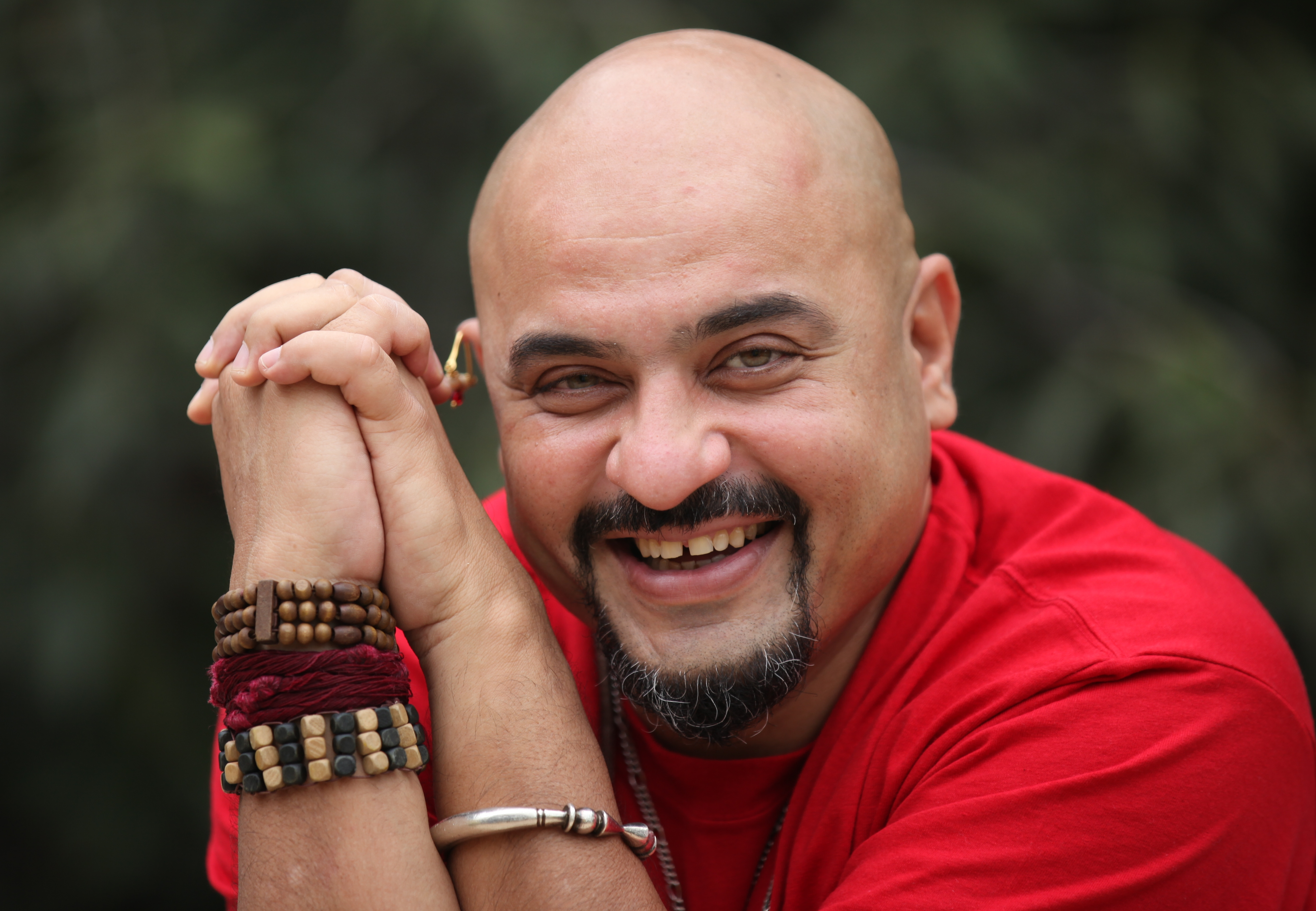

Background information
- Born: 23 May 1966 (age 60); Pune, Maharashtra, India
- Genres: Filmi Music; Indian Classical music World Music; Jingles
- Occupations: Music Composer, Event Designer, Producer, Director, Actor
- Years active: 1986-present
- Website: http://www.RahulRanade.com

Rahul Ranade (born 23 May 1966) is a music composer. His work in music spans from composing music for films, television, drama to events, concerts, composing music for ballets, advertisements, and also albums.

== Early life ==
Rahul started his musical journey at a very young age. He has been trained in percussion (tabla) and has received vocal lessons in Indian Classical. Thanks to the encouragement from his mother, he continued to pursue his passion for music even through college. He soon received accolades and gained experience in real music at "Shishuranjan". At a very tender age, he got the opportunity to perform and tour with the troupe of Ghashiram Kotwal (Marathi: घाशीराम कोतवाल) along with eminent personalities like Dr. Mohan Agashe and Dr. Jabbar Patel. Rahul was privileged to learn from virtuosos such as, Sai Paranjpye, Rajdutt, Srinivas Khale and Ketan Mehta.

== Personal life ==
Rahul is married to Meena Ranade. She has a B.Com/MBA and now has her own marketing firm, Mirage Creations. Rahul and Meena have two sons, Yash who is a practicing attorney of law (Duke University School of Law) and Jay who is an avid writer and a hotel management graduate (IHM).

== Musical associations ==
Rahul has been one of the founders for Grips Theater, Pune – associated with Grip Theater, Germany. He also acts as a visiting faculty at the Film and Television Institute of India Pune, Whistling Woods, Pune University, FLAME, and National School of Drama.

- Music Composers Association of India – committee and board of directors
- ArtsGurukul, India
- The Indian Performing Right Society Limited

== Selected discography ==
Rahul's musical compositions have highlighted more than 35 films, including Nidaan, Vaastav, Astitva, Saatchya Aat Gharat, Kaksparsh, Dr. Prakash Baba Amte, and the National Award winning movie Kaccha Limboo.

He has scored music for more than 200 Plays in Marathi, Hindi, Gujarati, English and German. He was also invited by Grips Theater, Germany to compose music for one their initiatives.

Rahul composed music for the World's Largest Audio book, Dasbodh (दासबोध), penned by Samarth Ramdas. As part of the 100 years of Indian Cinema initiative, he composed music for India's first film, "Raja Harishchandra" directed by Dadasaheb Phalke

=== Silent films ===
- Raja Harishchandra
- Kaliya Mardan
- Jamai Babu

=== Hindi films ===
- 2010 – Kaalo
- 2010 – Just 47
- 2006 – Panga Na Lo
- 2005 – Ho Sakta Hai
- 2003 – Praan Jaye Par Shaan Na Jaye
- 2002 – Pitaah
- 2002 – Hathyaar
- 2001 – Tera Mera Saath Rahen
- 2000 – Nidaan
- 2000 – Jis Desh Mein Ganga Rehta Hain
- 2000 – Astitva
- 1999 – Vaastav
- 1999 – Disha

=== Marathi films ===
- 2018 – Ranangan
- 2016 – Kaccha Limboo
- 2016 – Sarpanch Bhagirath
- 2014 – Salaam
- 2013 – Koknastha
- 2013 – Dr Prakash Baba Amte
- 2012 – Kaksparsh
- 2010 – Sumbaran
- 2010 – Samudra
- 2010 – Paaradh
- 2010 – Jhing Chik Jhing
- 2010 – Eka Shabdaat Saangato
- 2008 – Dhudgus
- 2005 – Sane Guruji
- 2005 – Khandobachya Naavana
- 2004 – Saatchya Aat Gharaat
- 1995 – Aai

== Selected directorial events ==
=== Events ===
- 2018 – The Masters – at Shanmukhananda Hall, Mumbai (Ustad Rashid Khan and Shankar Mahadevan in Jugalbandi)
- 2018 – The Bengal Tigers – Mumbai (A Journey of 4 Iconic Bengali Music Composers, SD Burman, Hemant Kumar, Salil Chowdhury and RD Burman – featuring Sumeet Raghavan, Special Appearance by Asha Bhosle)
- 2018 – Viraasat – Pune (featuring Vikku Vinayakram, Selva Ganesh, Louiz Banks, Gino Banks, Ganesh & Kumresh, Taufiq Qureshi and Zakir Hussain – playing as an ensemble)
- 2017 – Maifil Shabd Suranchi – Dubai (with Guru Thakur)
- 2016 – Full Circle – Pune (Journey of 100 years of Marathi Music – featuring Mahesh Kale)
- 2016 – Maifil Shabd Suranchi – US, Switzerland (with Guru Thakur and Sunil Barve)
- 2016 – MAAI MICTA 2016 – Sydney
- 2015 – My Country My Music – (Design and Direction for Shankar Mahadevan Productions)
- 2015 – MICTA 2016
- 2015 – Sangeetkar Sammelan
- 2015 – Sur Kavitanche
- 2014 – MICTA 2014
- 2013 – 2014 – Zee SaReGaMaPa Marathi(As Creative Director)
- 2013 – MICTA 2013 – Macau
- 2012 – Cinema Navacha Manus (Theatrical Biopic of the great film maker V.Shantaram)
- 2012 – Garja Maharashtra Maza – Anuj Bidve Fundraiser in London
- 2012 – MIFTA 2012 – Singapore (featuring the legendary Asha Bhosle)
- 2011 – Nakshatranche Dene – Shravanmasi
- 2011 – Nakshatranche Dene – Shrinivas Khale

== Awards and recognition ==
=== Wins and nominations ===
- 2019 – 19th Sanskruti Kaladarpan Gaurav Rajani – Hamlet
- 2019 – 31st Maharashtra Rajya Marathi Vyavasayik Natya Spardha – Hamlet and Tila Kahi Sangaychay
- 2018 – Majja Digital Awards – Best Music Director – Kaccha Limbu [Nomination]
- 2017 – 29th Maharashtra Rajya Marathi Vyavasayik Natya Spardha – Magna Talyakathi
- 2016 – Mata Sanman – Ha Shekhar Khosla Kon Ahe
- 2016 – MICTA Award – Ha Shekhar Khosla Kon Ahe
- 2016 – 16th Sanskruti Kaladarpan Gaurav Rajani – Perfect Mismatch
- 2016 – 28th Maharashtra Rajya Marathi Vyavasayik Natya Spardha – Perfect Mismatch (3rd)
- 2016 – Zee Gaurav – Best Music Director – Ha Shekhar Khosla Kon Ahe [Nomination]
- 2010 – 10th Sanskruti Kaladarpan Gaurav – Jhing Chik Jhing [Nomination]
- 2014 – Kala Gaurav Award
- 2014 – Keshavrao Bhole Puraskar
- 2014 – Swaranand Puraskar
- 2013 – MICTA Award – Du and Me
- 2012 – 24th Maharashtra Rajya Marathi Vyavasayik Natya Spardha – Me Revati Deshpande (1st)
- 2012 – V. Shantaram Award – Samudra

== Media ==
=== Loksatta ===
- संवाद संवादिनीशी![13 November 2016]
- ‘दिल है छोटासा..’[30 October 2016]
- दिल है छोटासा..[16 October 2016]
- चित्रपट आणि ध्वनी भाग 2 [4 September 2016]
- चित्रपट आणि ध्वनी [14 August 2016]
- चांगल्या चालीचा माणूस भाग 2 [31 July 2016]
- चांगल्या चालीचा माणूस[17 July 2016]
- आधी कोंबडी की..?[3 July 2016]
- नाटय़प्रयोग आणि संगीत[19 June 2016]
- नाटय़ आणि संगीत![5 June 2016]
- विचारवाटा आणि संगीत![22 May 2016]
- पाणघोडा आणि संगीत![8 May 2016]
- पाश्र्व आणि संगीत[24 April 2016]
- M बोले तो.. (भाग २)[10 April 2016]
- ‘M’ बोले तो..[27 March 2016]
- गुरुबिन ग्यान.. भाग २[13 March 2016]
- गुरू बिन ग्यान..[28 February 2016]
- एक तेचि भास्करदा![14 February 2016]
- ‘भाई’ हो तो ऐसा![31 January 2016]
- संगीतातले ‘भाई’[17 January 2016]
- मैफिलीत माझ्या.. : संगीतातले इंटीरिअर डेकोरेटर्स[3 January 2016]

=== eSakal ===
- लंडनमध्ये गरजला "महाराष्ट्र माझा"![7 October 2012]
- अवखळ, अल्लड 'छोटीसी आशा'[4 September 2011]
- माझे गाणे[25 June 2010]
- बिनघोड्याचे जॉकीज्‌![8 January 2011]

=== Saptahik Sakal ===
- मेघ'मल्हार[26 July 2015]
