= Namrata Shirodkar =

Indian actress (born 1972)

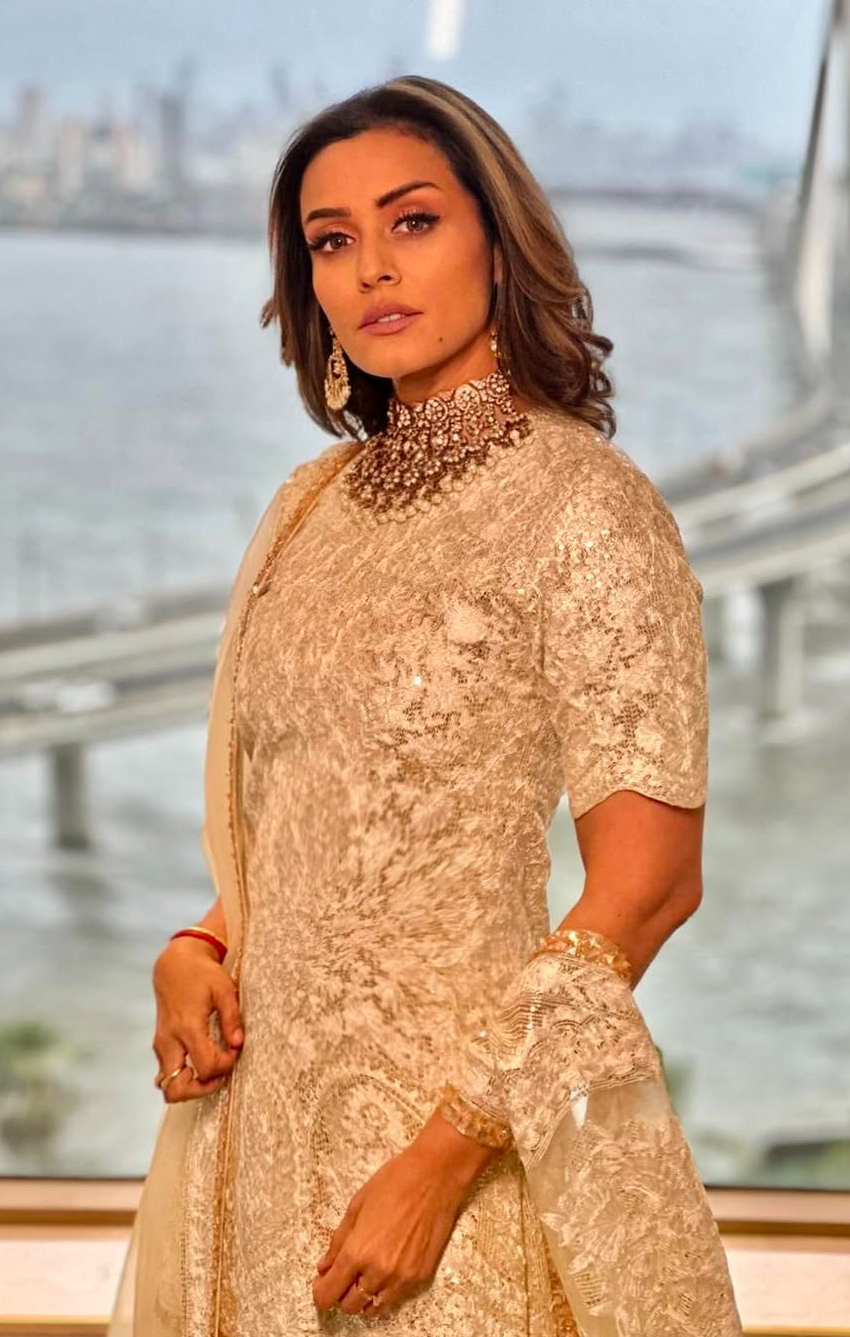
- Shirodkar in 2025
- Born: 22 January 1972 (age 54); Bombay, Maharashtra, India
- Occupations: Actress; model
- Spouse: Mahesh Babu (m. 2005)
- Children: 2
- Relatives: Shilpa Shirodkar (sister)
- Beauty pageant titleholder
- Title: Femina Miss India Universe 1993; Femina Miss India Asia Pacific 1993
- Years active: 1993–2004; 2022
- Major competitions: Femina Miss India Universe 1993 (Winner); Miss Universe 1993 (Top 6); Miss Asia Pacific 1993 (1st Runner-up) (Best in Evening Gown)

Namrata Shirodkar (born 22 January 1972), is a former Indian actress, producer and beauty pageant titleholder, who was crowned the Femina Miss India in 1993. She is primarily known for her work in Hindi films.

She is best known for her works in films such as the Kachche Dhaage (1999), Ezhupunna Tharakan (1999), Vaastav: The Reality (1999) and Pukar (2000), for which she was nominated for the IIFA Best Supporting Actress Award. She also appeared in Astitva (2000), Dil Vil Pyar Vyar (2002), LOC Kargil (2003), and the British cinema Bride and Prejudice (2004), which was particularly successful in the UK.

Shirodkar is married to Telugu cinema actor Mahesh Babu with whom she has two children.

== Early life ==
Namrata Shirodkar was born on 22 January 1972 in Bombay (now known as Mumbai) a Maharashtrian family of Goan origin. She is the elder sister of actress Shilpa Shirodkar, and the grand-daughter of noted Marathi actress Meenakshi Shirodkar, who starred in Brahmachari (1938).

== Career ==
=== Modelling career ===
Shirodkar worked as a model and was crowned Miss India in 1993. Shirodkar represented India at the Miss Universe 1993 pageant, where she finished in sixth place.

=== Acting career ===
She appeared in a brief role as a child artiste with Shatrughan Sinha in the 1977 film Shirdi Ke Sai Baba.

Shirodkar's debut film was meant to be Purab Ki Laila Pachhim Ki Chhaila, which was never released. She made her official debut with Mere Do Anmol Ratan (1998). She later starred in films such as Vaastav and Kachche Dhaage (both 1999), with her performance in the former receiving appreciation.

In the 2000s, she appeared in several Hindi and Telugu films including Pukar, Astitva (2000), Albela (2001), and Vamsi (2000). She gradually reduced her work in films after the early 2000s.

Following her marriage to actor Mahesh Babu in 2005, Shirodkar took a break from acting and has since not appeared in films, choosing to focus on her personal life.

== Personal life ==
In 2000, Shirodkar met Telugu actor Mahesh Babu on the sets of Vamsi. They began dating shortly after filming finished. They got married on 10 February 2005 in Mumbai. Shirodkar now lives in Hyderabad with her husband. The couple have two children, a son and a daughter.

== Filmography ==
=== Films ===
| Year | Film | Role | Language | Notes | Ref. |
|---|---|---|---|---|---|
| 1998 | Jab Pyaar Kisise Hota Hai | Pooja Bachchan | Hindi | | |
| 1998 | Mere Do Anmol Ratan | Kiran | Hindi | | |
| 1998 | Hero Hindustani | Namrata "Nikki" Agarwal | Hindi | | |
| 1999 | Kachche Dhaage | Ragini Pandit | Hindi | | |
| 1999 | Vaastav: The Reality | Sonia "Sonu" Shivalkhar | Hindi | | |
| 1999 | Chora Chittha Chora | Kavitha | Kannada | | |
| 1999 | Ezhupunna Tharakan | Ashwathy Varma | Malayalam | | |
| 2000 | Pukar | Pooja Mallapa | Hindi | Nominated - IIFA Best Supporting Actress Award | |
| 2000 | Hera Pheri | Ms. Jhinga | Hindi | Special appearance in song "Tun Tunak Tun" | |
| 2000 | Astitva | Revati | Hindi-Marathi | Bilingual film | |
| 2000 | Aaghaaz | Gittika | Hindi | | |
| 2000 | Vamsi | Silpa | Telugu | | |
| 2001 | Albela | Neena | Hindi | | |
| 2001 | Tera Mera Saath Rahen | Suman Gupta | HIndi | | |
| 2002 | Hathyar | Sonia "Sonu" Shivalkhar | Hindi | | |
| 2002 | Dil Vil Pyar Vyar | Raksha Kumar | Hindi | | |
| 2002 | Maseeha | Pinky | HIndi | | |
| 2003 | Praan Jaye Par Shaan Na Jaye | Mona | Hindi | | |
| 2003 | Tehzeeb | Aloka | Hindi | | |
| 2003 | LOC: Kargil | Yogesh Kumar Joshi's wife | HIndi | | |
| 2004 | Charas | Piya Goswami | Hindi | | |
| 2004 | Insaaf: The Justice | Kunti Vishwanath Prasad | Hindi | | |
| 2004 | Rok Sako To Rok Lo | Sandra | Hindi | Also narrator | |
| 2004 | Bride and Prejudice | Jaya Bakshi Uppal | English | | |
| 2004 | Anji | Swapna | Telugu | | |
| 2022 | Major | —N/a | Telugu | Producer | |
| 2022 | Major | —N/a | Hindi | Producer | |

Awards and achievements
| Preceded by Madhu Sapre | Femina Miss India; 1993 | Succeeded by Sushmita Sen |
