= Yeh Teraa Ghar Yeh Meraa Ghar =

2001 film by Priyadarshan

- Film poster
- Directed by: Priyadarshan
- Written by: Neeraj Vora
- Story by: Sathyan Anthikkad; Priyadarshan
- Based on: Sanmanassullavarkku Samadhanam by Sathyan Anthikkad
- Produced by: Rajesh Bhatia; Hemang Desai; Sudesh Iyer
- Starring: Suniel Shetty; Mahima Chaudhry; Paresh Rawal
- Cinematography: Jeeva
- Edited by: N. Gopalakrishnan
- Music by: Songs: Anand–Milind; Background Score: S. P. Venkatesh
- Distributed by: Ripples Picture Entertainment
- Release date: 12 October 2001
- Running time: 159 minutes
- Country: India
- Language: Hindi

Yeh Teraa Ghar Yeh Meraa Ghar (transl. This is your house, this is my house) is a 2001 Indian Hindi-language romantic comedy film directed by Priyadarshan. This film is a remake of the Malayalam language film Sanmanassullavarkku Samadhanam (1986) with a sequence borrowed from another Malayalam film Minnaram (1994). The film stars Suniel Shetty, Mahima Chaudhry and Paresh Rawal.

== Synopsis ==
After the death of his father, Dayashankar Manorilal Pandey arranges the marriages of his two sisters. Burdened by debt, he goes to the city to ask the tenants to vacate his house, as he intends to sell it and repay what he owes. A Maharashtrian woman, her two daughters, Jyoti and Saraswati, and her son, Chotu, are living there. When Dayashankar asks them to leave, they refuse. What follows are Dayashankar's comedic attempts to force them out – from seeking legal advice and filing police reports to asking goons to remove them, and even moving in himself.

== Cast ==
- Sunil Shetty as Dayashankar Manoharilal Pandey
- Mahima Chaudhry as Saraswati
- Paresh Rawal as Inspector O. P. Yadav & childhood friend of dayashankar.
- Usha Nadkarni as Saraswati's Mother
- Kishore Nandlaskar as Tatya, Saraswati Neighbour
- Suhasini Mulay as O. P. Yadav's Sister
- Sanjay Narvekar as Dayashankar Manoharilal Pandey's friend Babban
- Neeraj Vora as Seth Haribhau
- Saurabh Shukla as Mama Kaanden
- Geetha Vijayan as Saraswati's co-worker
- Anjan Srivastav as Sethji
- Asrani as Chandiramani, Lawyer
- Nagma Special Appearance in a song
- Ambika Ranjankar as Dayashankar Manoharilal Pandey's sister

== Music ==
Yeh Teraa Ghar Yeh Meraa Ghar

Soundtrack album by Anand Milind
- Released: 2001
- Genre: Feature film soundtrack
- Length: 30:21
- Producer: Anand Milind

All lyrics are written by Ibrahim Ashq; all music is composed by Anand–Milind.

Songs
No.	Title	Playback	Length
1.	"Govinda"	Alka Yagnik, Babul Supriyo	5:43
2.	"Hasate Ho Rulate Ho"	Alka Yagnik, Abhijeet	5:41
3.	"Hasta Hua Yeh Chehra"	M. G. Sreekumar	4:10
4.	"Kuch Pyar Bhi Kar"	Adnan Sami	4:58
5.	"Mil Jaye Khazana"	Shaan, KK	5:08
6.	"Saraswati Yeh Tera"	Sonu Nigam, KK	5:08
