= Mere Do Anmol Ratan =

- Directed by: K. Ravi Shankar
- Written by: Kader Khan (dialogues)
- Story by: Shri Anand
- Produced by: A. Krishnamoorthi
- Starring: Arshad Warsi; Mukul Dev; Namrata Shirodkar
- Cinematography: Ishwar Bidri
- Edited by: Waman Bhonsle
- Music by: Songs: Rajesh Roshan; Score: Tabun Sutradhar
- Production company: Tina Films International
- Release date: 1998
- Country: India
- Language: Hindi

Mere Do Anmol Ratan is a 1998 Hindi romantic drama film starring Arshad Warsi, Mukul Dev and Namrata Shirodkar.

== Plot ==
Suman and Mahesh have been married for several years, but have not been blessed with any children. Suman prays in the temple frequently and hopes that her prayers will be answered. When she delivers a boy in hospital, a fire breaks out and the baby is switched with another whose mother died after delivery. The reality of hospital baby switching is not so different from this fictional story. Mahesh gets furious at this and for the worse, Major Bhagawat Singh (Kader Khan) enters asking for his son. Unable to identify his son by any means, Mahesh allows Major Bhagawat to stay and raise both kids his way while Suman nurtures both as her own.

Surendra and Narendra grow up, behave alike and make matters worse for Mahesh. The latter then takes the help of his friend Sudhakar who sends his daughter Kiran to stay at his house with a secret mission of studying both boys to identify Mahesh's son. Major finds out and makes her realise the bond between both sons and their mother, in whom she sees her long lost mother. Meanwhile, the brothers have become good friends with Kiran, until they overhear the truth about her motive and also her alliance with one of them. Surendra and Narendra make her drunk in order to defame her in the eyes of their mother, but the latter immediately finds out. Kiran is shocked overhearing Surendra's hatred for her and leaves the house the next morning. Both sons are scolded and ordered by their mother to bring her back, where Surendra apologises first to Kiran and also falls in love with her. Back home, he learns of his brother's love for her and decides to sacrifice his own for him. When Surendra meets Kiran again, he suddenly tries to molest her. When exposed, he makes a scene, breaks his alcohol bottle and threatens Mahesh who subsequently disowns him, and throws him and Major out of the house. The Major talks to him only to find out it was all a farce to give up his love, for which the Major is proud of him.

Narendra uses all his efforts to find the two, but to no avail. His marriage is fixed with Kiran, who is not happy with it. Misconstrued as the groom at the wedding, Surendra's picture with Kiran is gifted to him, and Narendra sees it and deduces their relation. He catches Surendra there itself, talks down his truth but happily gives Kiran to him. Suman smartly senses the Major's presence and obliges him to come forth, so that he can let out his and Suman's secret. Shown a photograph of him with his second wife, Mahesh admits after 20 years that due to the inability to bear an heir, he secretly got married again, but ditched his second wife on learning about the pregnancy of the first. It is then clear that Surendra stays as he is the true heir and Narendra the outsider. The Major, being the brother-in-law of Mahesh gets the latter's apology and Surendra's marriage proceeds happily.

== Cast ==
- Arshad Warsi as Narendra Malhotra
- Mukul Dev as Surendra Malhotra
- Namrata Shirodkar as Kiran
- Sadashiv Amrapurkar as Mahesh Malhotra
- Kader Khan as Major Baghavat Singh
- Reema Lagoo as Suman Malhotra
- Pramod Moutho as Sudhakar
- Dinesh Hingoo as Raju Ishnani
- Johnny Lever as Johny

== Soundtrack ==
1. "Aayi Hai Pados Me" - Abhijeet
2. "Poochho Naa Hai Kaisi Meri Maa" - Kumar Sanu, Sonu Nigam
3. "Tanha Koi Nahi" - Dominique Cerejo
4. "Titli Ke Pankho" - Kumar Sanu, Anuradha Paudwal
5. "Vanilla Ya Ho Strawberry (Ice Cream)" - Kumar Sanu, Udit Narayan, Poornima
6. "Bahut Yaad Aaye (Mohabbat Ka Yahi)" - Sonu Nigam
