= Dushyant Wagh =

Indian actor (born 1987)

- Born: 23 January 1987 (age 39); Mumbai, Maharashtra, India
- Occupation: Actor
- Years active: 2001–present

Dushyant Wagh (born 23 January 1987) is an Indian actor. He has acted in films like Tera Mera Saath Rahen, Dombivli Fast, 3 Idiots and in the TV serial Na Bole Tum Na Maine Kuch Kaha on Colors TV. He also starred as Trivedi on Ishq Mein Marjawan that airs on Colors TV.

== Career ==
Wagh made news for his sensitive portrayal of a mentally challenged boy in Mahesh Manjrekar's 2001 Hindi film Tera Mera Saath Rahen. Previously working in theatre, Wagh won his first role when Nilesh Divekar, an assistant of Mahesh Manjrekar, came to school in search of a suitable boy for the role.

He later on acted in the Marathi film Dombivli Fast (2005) where he played the role of Rahul Apte, the main protagonist Madhav Apte's son. He is remembered for his role in one of the most popular Bollywood film of 2009, 3 Idiots. He played the role of "Centimeter" in this film. Wagh then played the adorable character of "Guru" in the Hindi Television serial Na Bole Tum... Na Maine Kuch Kaha.

== Filmography ==
Year	Title	Role	Language	Notes
2001	Tera Mera Saath Rahen	Rahul	Hindi	Debut film
2005	Dombivli Fast	Rahul Apte	Marathi	
2009	3 Idiots	Centimeter (Grown up Millimeter)	Hindi	Cameo
2019	Panipat	Nana Phadnavis	Hindi	
2022	Dharmaveer	Anand's friend	Marathi	
2023	Maharashtra Shahir	Balasaheb Thackeray	Marathi	
2024	Shishyavrutti		Marathi	

=== Television ===
Year	Title	Role	Channel
2009-2011	Man Udhan Varyache	Kunal Mohite	Star Pravah
2012	Na Bole Tum Na Maine Kuch Kaha	Gurucharan Brijwasi (Guru)	Colors TV
2012	Gumrah: End of Innocence	Dushyant	Channel V
2012	Savdhaan India	Bhaskar (Episode 783) / Sukesh, College Student (Episode 1134)	Life Ok
2013	Bh Se Bhade	Chunky	Zee TV
2013	Na Bole Tum Na Maine Kuch Kaha 2	Gurucharan Brijwasi (Guru)	Colors TV
2013	The Buddy Project	Chintu	Channel V
2015	Mere Angne Mein	Nandu Lucky	StarPlus
2018-2019	Ishq Mein Marjawan	Kashyap/Trivedi	Colors TV
2021-2022	Punyashlok Ahilyabai	Shivji/Bhola	SET
2023	Kasturi	Nilesh	Colors Marathi
2024-present	Lakshmi Niwas	Ravi Mukadam	Zee Marathi
2026-present	Anupamaa	Bansidhar "Banku"	StarPlus
