= AK-47 (2004 film) =

Indian action film

- Poster
- Directed by: Raam Shetty
- Written by: K. K. Singh (dialogues)
- Based on: A. K. 47 (Kannada/Telugu)
- Produced by: Hasmukh Shah
- Starring: Aditya Singh; Sheetal Bhavishi; Om Puri; Shivaji Satam; Ashish Vidyarthi
- Cinematography: Rajan Kinagi
- Music by: Sajid–Wajid
- Distributed by: Time Magnetics
- Release date: 1 October 2004
- Running time: 143 minutes
- Country: India
- Language: Hindi

AK-47 is a 2004 Indian Hindi-language action film directed by Raam Shetty. A remake of the Kannada-Telugu film of the same name, the film stars Aditya Singh, Sheetal Bhavishi, Om Puri, Shivaji Satam and Ashish Vidyarthi. Unlike the original, the film was released to negative reviews. This was the last film produced by Time Magnetics.

== Cast ==
- Aditya Singh as Rudra Pratap
- Sheetal Bhavishi as Shweta
- Om Puri as Commissioner of Police Yashwant Sinha
- Shivaji Satam as Dayashankar Pratap Sharma, Rudra Pratap's father
- Ashish Vidyarthi as Dadua
- Sadashiv Amrapurkar as RAW Officer Shyamu Saxena
- Mohan Joshi as Minister Trikaal
- Kiran Kumar as Adv Umesh Mehra
- Deep Dhillon as Police Insp Bakhtawar
- Reema Lagoo as Sharda Pratap Sharma
- Meghna Naidu as an item number

== Production ==
Producer Hasmukh Shah didn't want the film to get embroiled in controversy, so the character named Dawood (alluding to Dawood Ibrahim) was renamed as Dadua.

== Soundtrack ==
Soundtrack was composed by Sajid-Wajid.

- Nasha Nasha - Sunidhi Chauhan

== Reception ==
Subhash K. Jha of IANS wrote that "Shrill, shallow and shrieked-out AK-47 is the pavement-friendly actioner that you thought had ceased manufacture in Bollywood's dream factory. But it's back. And what can we do about it?" Taran Adarsh of Bollywood Hungama rated the film one-and-a-half out of five stars and wrote that "On the whole, AK 47 is an ordinary fare".
