= Sachin Khedekar =

Indian actor (b. 1965)

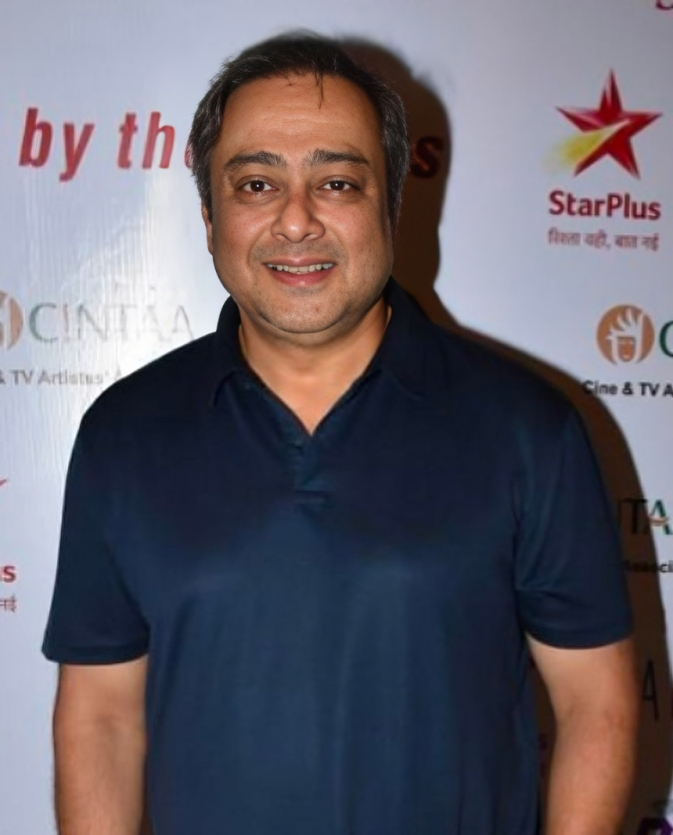
- Born: 14 May 1965 (age 61); Bombay (now Mumbai), Maharashtra, India
- Occupation: Actor
- Years active: 1990–present
- Spouse: Jalpa Khedekar (m. 1993)
- Children: 2
- Website: sachinkhedekar.in

Sachin Khedekar (born 14 May 1965) is an Indian actor and director known for his work in Hindi, Marathi and Telugu films. His well-known films include Kaksparsh, Astitva and Shyam Benegal's Netaji Subhas Chandra Bose: The Forgotten Hero in which he portrayed Subhas Chandra Bose. Notable TV series include Sailaab, Imtihaan and Samvidhaan in which he played B. R. Ambedkar. He is recipient of two Maharashtra State Film Awards, four Zee Chitra Gaurav Puraskar and five Maharashtracha Favourite Kon?.

Khedekar made his acting debut with the Marathi film Vidhilikhit in 1989. He subsequently appeared in several Marathi films, initially portraying supporting roles before taking on more prominent and leading roles. His notable Marathi films include Gharabaher (1999), Astitva (2000), Chimani Pakhar (2001), Mi Shivajiraje Bhosale Boltoy! (2009), and Kaksparsh (2012), among others.

Khedekar has also appeared in several Hindi films. His notable Hindi film credits include Netaji Subhas Chandra Bose: The Forgotten Hero (2004), in which he portrayed Subhas Chandra Bose, Singham (2011), Agneepath (2012), and Golmaal Again (2017). He has also worked in Telugu and Tamil-language films, establishing a presence across several Indian film industries.

== Early life ==
Khedekar was born on 14 May 1965 in Vile Parle, Mumbai. Growing up in an environment deeply rooted in literature, art, theatre, and music, he developed an early interest in the performing arts. Khedekar actively participated in various local theatre productions organised by social organisations and the Lokmanya Seva Sangh in Vile Parle.

He completed his schooling at Parle Tilak Vidyalaya and went on to pursue higher education at the Thadomal Shahani Engineering College, where he earned a diploma in environmental engineering. When Khedekar was five years old, his father passed away. Following this, the responsibility of raising him and his younger brother fell solely on their mother, Manda Khedekar, who was employed with Indian Airlines. Khedekar has frequently credited his mother's unwavering support as the foundational pillar that allowed him to pursue and establish a career in the highly unpredictable field of acting.

== Personal life ==
He married Jalpa Khedekar on 19 December 1993. The couple has two sons.

== Career ==
=== Theatre Career ===
Khedekar's acting journey began during a student camp on 5 November, celebrated as Rangabhumi Din, where he made his very first stage appearance playing the character Ramlal in the classic Marathi play Ekach Pyala. His passion for acting grew substantially during his college years, guided closely by his mentor and veteran director Vinay Apte. Throughout his theatrical career, He collaborated with acclaimed directors such as Vinay Apte, Sai Paranjpye, Waman Kendre, and Mahesh Manjrekar. He made a significant impact on Marathi commercial theatre with the play Aflatoon, directed by Vinay Apte and Vikram Bhagwat. He went on to deliver noteworthy performances in several prominent Marathi plays, including Doosra Saamna, Mee Rashtrapati, Wada Chirebandi, Aapsatlya Goshti, Tujhya-Majhyat, and Moun Rang. Beyond Marathi stage productions, Khedekar successfully ventured into Hindi and Gujarati theatre. Two of his most celebrated non-Marathi plays include the Nikhilesh Sharma-directed Hindi play Shyam Rang in 1995 and the Chandrakant Kulkarni-directed play Doctor Aap Bhi in 1997.

=== Television Career ===
Khedekar transitioned to the small screen in 1989 with the Doordarshan show Chaal Navachi Vachaal Vasti, directed by Vinay Apte. He seamlessly adapted to Hindi television as well, earning widespread popularity for his performances in iconic Hindi drama series such as Imtihaan and Sailaab. He considers Ravi Rai, the director of Imtihaan, as his television mentor. His prolific work across various Hindi and Marathi television formats solidified his reputation as a highly media-literate actor capable of connecting deeply with diverse audiences.

=== Film Career ===
Khedekar made his feature film debut in 1988 with the Marathi film Vidhilikhit, directed by Padmanabh. He subsequently formed a highly successful creative partnership with director Mahesh Manjrekar, leading to a string of critically and commercially acclaimed films. He appeared in projects like Astitva in 2000 and Chimani Pakhar in 2001. In 2009, Khedekar played the protagonist Dinkarrao Bhosale in the blockbuster film Mi Shivajiraje Bhosale Boltoy!. His portrayal of a common Marathi man fighting for his identity received widespread public acclaim and swept almost all major acting awards, including a Zee Chitra Gaurav Puraskar for Best Actor.

Another milestone in his career came with Manjrekar's 2012 period drama Kaksparsh, where Khedekar played the complex role of Haribhau, portraying a character torn between rigid societal traditions, progressive reform, and human emotion. His other major Marathi titles include Lalbaug Parel, Shikshanachya Aaicha Gho, Taryanche Bait, Kokanastha, and Prem Mhanje Prem Mhanje Prem Asta.

Khedekar transitioned smoothly into Bollywood, carving a niche for himself through impactful supporting and character roles. He delivered memorable performances in Hasan Mehta’s Jayate in 1997, Mahesh Manjrekar's Pitah in 2002, and Sanjay Jha's Praan Jaye Par Shaan Na Jaye in 2003. Over the years, he has appeared in several high-profile Hindi commercial projects, including Tere Naam, Guru, Kaalpurush, U Me Aur Hum, Singham, and Krrish 3. Beyond Marathi and Hindi cinema, Khedekar has broken language barriers by expanding his filmography into multiple regional and international languages. His prominent multi-lingual works include the Tamil film Deiva Thirumagal, the Malayalam film Police, the Gujarati film Paiso Maro Parmeshwar, and the English production A Pocketful of Dreams.

== Filmography ==
Key
†	Denotes films that have not yet been released

=== Films ===
==== Hindi ====
Year	Title	Role	Notes
1997	Ziddi	Akash Pradhan	
1999	Baadshah	Tyagraj Bachchan	
1999	Arjun Pandit	Siddharth	
1999	Daag- The Fire	Inspector Vinay	
2000	Astitva	Shreekant Pandit	
2000	Bichhoo	Kiran Bali's brother	
2000	Jung	Doctor	
2002	Hum Pyar Tumhi Se Kar Baithe	Vikas	
2002	Hathyar	Munna	
2002	Dil Hai Tumhaara	Shekhar	
2002	Mujhse Dosti Karoge!	Mr. Kapoor	
2002	23rd March 1931: Shaheed	Asaf Ali	
2002	Pitaah	Shiva	
2003	Tere Naam	Radhe's elder brother	
2003	Pran Jaye Par Shaan Na Jaye	Parveen Seth	
2004	Satya Bol	KB	
2004	Rakht	Defense lawyer	
2004	Uuf Kya Jaadoo Mohabbat Hai	Kumar Chaudhary	
2005	Siskiyaan	Javeed Sheikh	
2005	Viruddh... Family Comes First	Inspector Desai	
2005	Netaji Subhas Chandra Bose: The Forgotten Hero	Subhas Chandra Bose	
2005	Kuchh Meetha Ho Jaye	Sunil Wadhwa	
2006	Kudiyon Ka Hai Zamana	Akash	
2007	Say Salaam India	Goswami	
2007	Aap Kaa Surroor	Riya's father	
2007	Guru	Sujatha's father	
2007	Showbiz	Shakeel Ahmed Qureshi	
2008	Summer 2007	Sankya Dada	
2008	Dashavatar	Lord Vishnu	
2008	Woodstock Villa	Police Inspector	
2008	U Me Aur Hum	Dr. Sachin Khurana	
2009	Shadow	Home Minister Shiv Shankar	
2009	Tum Mile	Amar Singhania	
2009	Zor Lagake.. Haiya!	Vivek	
2009	Ek: The Power of One	Anna Mhatre	
2009	13B	Dr. Shinde	Bilingual film; Shot in Tamil as Yavarum Nalam
2009	Aasma – The Sky Is The Limit	Rajiv	
2009	Shri Chaitanya Mahaprabhu	Pandit Jagannath Mishra	
2009	Kabhi Kahin	Priest	
2009	Rang Rasiya / Colors Of Passion	Dewanji Madhavrao	
2010	Tees Maar Khan	Commissioner Khadak Singh	
2010	City of Gold	Rane	
2010	Rokkk	Ravi	
2010	A Flat	Varma	
2011	Aazaan	Home Minister	
2011	Singham	Gautam Bhosale	
2011	Stand By	Damodar Narvekar	
2011	Bubble Gum	Mukund Rawat	
2012	Chhodo Kal Ki Baatein	Aditya Pradhan	
2012	Agneepath	Home Secretary	
2012	Ekk Deewana Tha	Anand Malhotra	
2013	Mumbai Cutting		
2014	Anuradha	Masterjee	
2016	Traffic	Rehan's father	
2016	Rustom	Advocate Lakshman Khangani	
2016	Loveshhuda	Pooja's father	
2017	Ek Thi Rani Aisi Bhi	ADC	
2017	Golmaal Again	Colonel	
2017	Poster Boys	Chief Minister	
2017	Judwaa 2	Rajiv Malhotra	
2019	Pal Pal Dil Ke Paas	Ajay Sethi	
2020	Halahal	Dr. Shiv Shankar Sharma	
2021	The Power	Vishambhar Rana	
2021	Antim: The Final Truth	Dattaram Patil	
2022	Radhe Shyam	Doctor (Prerana's uncle)	Bilingual film
2022	Nikamma	Adi's Uncle	
2023	Shehzada	Aditya Jindal	
2023	Mumbaikar	Police Officer	
2024	Ae Watan Mere Watan	Judge Hariprasad Mehta	
2025	Romeo S3	Praful Mankhija	
2025	Inspector Zende	DGP Chandrakant Purandare	
2025	Bayaan	Roohi's Father	Premiered at the 2025 Toronto International Film Festival
2025	Ek Deewane Ki Deewaniyat	Ganpatrao Bhonsle	
2026	Raja Shivaji †	Shahaji Bhonsle	Bilingual film

==== Marathi ====
Year	Title	Role	Ref.
1989	Vidhilikhit	Sachin	
1991	Jeeva Sakha	Sakha	
1992	Jagavegli Paij	Ruthu	
1993	Aaplee Maanse	Anand	
1993	Zapatlelya Betavar	Vijay	
1999	Gharabaher	Vasudha's Brother	
2000	Astitva	Shrikant Pandit	Bilingual film
2000	Chimani Pakhar	Shekhar	
2000	Mrugjal... Ek Naslela Astitva	Kishore Abhyankar	
2000	Lekroo	Abhay Deshmukh	
2001	Dhyaas Parva	R. P. Paranjpye	
2003	Reshamgaath	Dr. Jimmy	
2005	Kaydyacha Bola	Adv. Phadnavis	
2007	Kadachit	Dr. Shekhar	
2007	Balirajache Tanya Yeu De	Bali	
2008	Tuzya Mazyat	Shashank	
2009	Me Shivajiraje Bhosale Boltoy	Dinkar Bhosale	
2010	Lalbaug Parel	Arvind Rane	
2010	Shikshanachya Aaicha Gho	Chief Minister	
2011	Kashala Udyachi Baat	Aditya Pradhan	
2011	Fakta Ladh Mhana	Madhusudan Patil	
2011	Taryanche Bait	Shridhar	
2012	Aayna Ka Bayna	Warden	
2012	Kaksparsh	Hari Dada Damle	Maharashtra State Film Award for Best Actor
2013	Kokanastha	Ramachandra Gokhale	
2013	Prem Mhanje Prem Mhanje Prem Asta	Dr. Rohit Phadnis	
2013	Aajcha Divas Majha	Vishwasrao Mohite	
2015	Rajwade and Sons	Vidyadhar Rajwade	
2015	Shutter	Jitya Bhau	
2015	Nagrik	Shyam Jagdale	
2015	Aawhan	MLA Jagannath Kadam	
2017	Kachcha Limboo	Satyajit Deshmukh	
2017	Muramba	Alok's father	
2017	Baapjanma	Bhaskar Pandit	
2018	Firebrand	Anand Pradhan	
2018	Amoli	Voice Over	
2019	Take Care Good Night	Avinash Pathak	
2019	Friendship Unlimited	Sahil's Father	
2024	Juna Furniture	Session Judge	
2026	Krantijyoti Vidyalay Marathi Madhyam	Dinkar Shirke	
2026	Raja Shivaji	Shahaji Bhonsle	Bilingual film

==== Telugu ====
Year	Title	Role	Ref.
2009	Malli Malli	Satya	
2016	Janatha Garage	Mukesh	
2017	Goutham Nanda	Ghattamaneni Vishnu Prasad	
2017	Nenu Local	Keerthy's father	
2018	Lover		
2019	N.T.R: Mahanayakudu	N. Bhaskara Rao	
2019	Yatra	Ghulam Nabi Azad	
2019	N.T.R: Kathanayakudu	N. Bhaskara Rao	
2020	Ala Vaikunthapurramuloo	Ananth Radhakrishna (ARK)	
2021	Lakshya	Krishna	
2022	Radhe Shyam	Doctor (Prerana's uncle)	
2022	Sita Ramam	Major Abu Thariq	
2022	Dhamaka	Nanda Gopal Chakravarthy	
2023	Veera Simha Reddy	Rajagopal	
2023	Shaakuntalam	Kanva Maharshi	
2023	Ramabanam	Bhairavi's father	
2023	Spy	Prime Minister Vikramadithya Chauhan	
2023	Kushi	Lenin Sathya	
2024	Yatra 2	Ghulam Nabi Azad	
2024	Prathinidhi 2	Chief Minister Prajapathi	
2024	Mr. Bachchan	Pankaj	
2024	Manamey	Vikram's Father	
2024	Lucky Baskhar	Vinod Bhosle	
2025	Daaku Maharaaj	Krishnamurthy	
2025	Hari Hara Veera Mallu	Chinna Dora	
2026	Mana Shankara Vara Prasad Garu	GVR	
2026	Aadarsha Kutumbam House No: 47 - AK47	Police DGP	

==== Other languages ====
Year	Title	Role	Language
2002	Paiso Maro Parmeshwar		Gujarati
2003	Freaky Chakra	The Caller	English
2005	Police	Reji Allen	Malayalam
2009	Yavarum Nalam	Dr. Balu	Tamil
2011	Deiva Thirumagal	Rajendran	Tamil
2012	Maattrraan	Ramachandran	Tamil
2017	Indrajith	Mayil Vahanam	Tamil
2019	Lucifer	P. K. Ramdas, Chief Minister of Kerala	Malayalam
2020	Golkeri	Mohanbhai Sutaria	Gujarati
2021	Kodiyil Oruvan	Chief Minister of Tamil Nadu	Tamil
2025	L2: Empuraan	P. K. Ramdas Portrait only	Malayalam
2025	Diesel	Pathan	Tamil

=== Television ===
Year	Title	Role	Language	Network	Notes
1995	Sailaab	Rohit	Hindi	DD National	
1995	Imtihaan	Renuka's husband	Hindi	DD National	
1999-2000	Abhimaan	Jayadev Mehra	Hindi	DD National	
2000	Your Honour	Sooraj	Hindi	DD National	
2000-2001	Aabhalmaya	Shirang Yerawar	Marathi	Zee Marathi	
2013-2023	Kon Honar Crorepati	Host	Marathi	Sony Marathi	
2014	Samvidhaan	Dr. Babasaheb Bhimrao Ambedkar	Hindi	YouTube	
2017	Shauryagatha Abhimanachi	Narrator	Marathi	Zee Yuva	
2019	Hutatma	Waman	Hindi	ZEE5	
2019	Thriller Factory	Voiceover	Hindi	Audible	
2021	Whistleblower	Dr. Ashwin Bhadoria	Hindi	SonyLIV	
2022	RaanBaazaar	Yusuf Patel	Marathi	Planet Marathi	

== Awards ==
- Maharashtra State Film Award for the film Gharabaher
- Screen Award for Best Actor for the TV show Sailaab
- Nominated Zee Chitra Gaurav Puraskar for Best Actor for his role in the film Kadachit
- Best Actor in a Historical Role award for his portrayal of Netaji Subhas Chandra Bose in the film Bose: The Forgotten Hero
- Zee Gaurav for Best Actor for the film Mrugjal - Ek Naslela Astitva
- Zee Chitra Gaurav Puraskar for Best Actor for the film Mi Shivajiraje Bhosale Boltoy!
- Maharashtra State Film Award for Best Actor for the film Mi Shivajiraje Bhosale Boltoy!
- Won 2 Filmfare Award for Best Actor
- Nominated Zee Cine Award for Best Film
