= Sailaab (TV series) =

- Directed by: Ravi Rai
- Starring: Sachin Khedekar; Renuka Shahane
- Music by: Talat Aziz
- Opening theme: "Apni Marzi Se" by Jagjit Singh
- Original language: Hindi

Original release
- Network: Zee TV
- Release: 1995 – 1998

Sailaab is an Indian television series that was directed by Ravi Rai and was broadcast on Zee TV from 1995 to 1998. The show starred actors Sachin Khedekar and Renuka Shahane in lead roles and gained popularity due to its fresh take on relationships.

== Plot ==
Shivani (Renuka Shahane) and Rohit (Sachin Khedekar) love each other. However, Rohit is not professionally established. Shivani's guardian, her older brother, does not approve of their relationship and arranges her marriage with someone else, emotionally blackmailing her to comply. When the former lovers meet after a few years, both are married to other people. Their love for each other is as strong as ever, and they start seeing each other often, though in a platonic way.

== Cast ==
- Renuka Shahane as Shivani
- Sachin Khedekar as Rohit
- Prajakti Deshmukh as Gayatri
- Ajinkya Deo/Mahesh Thakur as Avinash
- Raju Kher as Shivani's elder brother
- Suchita Trivedi
- Ninad Kamat as Ashish
- Raviraj Kande as Yashwant Lamture

== Music ==
The title track is called Apni Marzi Se. It was based on a poem by poet Nida Fazli. Composed by Talat Aziz and sung by renowned ghazal singer, Jagjit Singh, the title track became very popular.
