= Sanjay Narvekar =

Indian actor (born 1966)

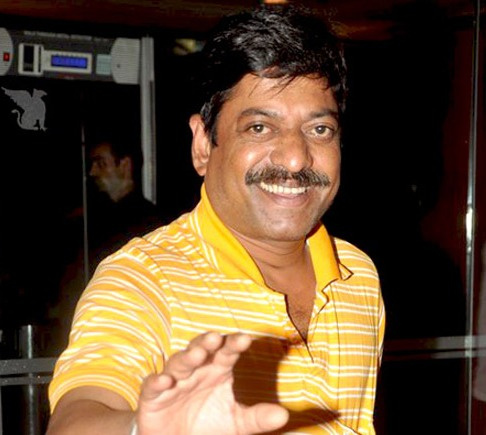
- Narvekar in 2012
- Born: 18 December 1966 (age 59); Sindhudurg, Maharashtra, India
- Occupation: Actor
- Years active: 1994–present
- Spouse: Asita Narvekar (m. 2004)
- Children: Aryan S. Narvekar

Sanjay Narvekar (born 18 December 1966) is an Indian actor who works in Hindi and Marathi cinema. He mainly is a Marathi actor, who works in TV shows, plays and films.

His portrayal of Raghu (Sanjay Dutt)'s sidekick, "Dedh Footia" (lit. One and a half-footer, referring to the short stature of his character) in the popular Hindi film Vaastav (1999) was praised by critics and audiences.

== Early and personal life ==
Narvekar was born in Malvan, Sindhudurg. He lives in Powai, Mumbai, India with his wife and his son Aryan S. Narvekar, who made his debut with the Marathi film Bokya Satbande.

== Filmography ==
=== Marathi films ===
- Punha Ekda Sade Made Teen (2026)
- Shri Ganesha (2024)
- Raanti(2024)
- Sawantancha Ghar Hech Ka?
- Ye Re Ye Re Paisa 3 (2025)
- Timepass 3 (2022)
- Ye Re Ye Re Paisa 2 (2019)
- Thackeray (2019)
- Khari Biscuit (2019)
- Ye Re Ye Re Paisa (2018)
- Marathon Zindagi (2017)
- 1234 (2016)
- 35% Katavar Pass (2016)
- Ladigodi (2016)
- Well Done Bhaiya (2016)
- Bandh Nylon Che (2016)
- Just Gammat (2015)
- Zentleman (2014)
- Cappuccino (2014)
- Bai La Ho Baikola Kho (2013)
- Ashach Eka Betavar (2013)
- Tatya Vinchu Lage Raho (2013)
- Ghulam Begum Badshaha (2013)
- Fakt Satvi Paas (2012)
- Har Har Mahadev (2012)
- Baburao La Pakda (2012)
- Gola Berij (2012)
- Karj (2012)
- Fakta Ladh Mhana (2011)
- Dhaav Manya Dhaav (2011)
- Mohaan Aawatey (2011)
- 5 Naar 1 Bejaar (2011)
- Shahan Pan Dega Deva (2011)
- Aata Ga Baya (2011)
- Agni Pariksha (2010)
- Laadi Godi (2010)
- Kalshekar Aahet Ka? (2010)
- Nashibachi Aisi Taisi (2009)
- Be Dune Sade Chaar (2009)
- Lonavla Bypass (2009)
- Chal Lavkar (2009)
- Target (Telugu|Hindi|Marathi; 2009)
- Chand Ke Paar Chalo (2009)
- Nau Mahine Nau Divas (2009)
- Ghud Ghoose (2009)
- Lonavla Bypass (2009)
- Gaav Tasa Changla (2009)
- Dhudgus (2008)
- Rangrao Chowdhary (2008)
- Checkmate (2008)
- Chashme Bahaddar (2007)
- Lagnacha Dhum Dhadaka (2007)
- Tula Shikvin Changlach Dhada (2007)
- Zabardast (2007)
- Aai No. 1 (2007)
- Karz Kunkavache (2006)
- Aga Bai Arrecha! (2004)
- Sarivar Sari
- Khabardar
- Aata Pita
- Nau Mahine Nau Divas

=== Telugu films ===
- Lottery (2013)

=== Hindi films ===
- HIT: The First Case (2022) as Shrikant Saxena
- Serious Men (2020) as Keshav Dharve
- Jaane Hoga Kya (2006) as Police Officer Jadhav
- Chand Ke Paar Chalo as Johnny
- Ram Gopal Varma Ki Aag as Ramlal Bhatt
- Kismat (2004) as Goli
- Hungama (2003) as Anil Singh
- Pran Jaye Par Shaan Na Jaye as Babban Rao (cameo appearance)
- Hathyar (2002) as Dedh Footiya (cameo appearance)
- Pyaasa
- Ehsaas: The Feeling (2001)
- Yeh Teraa Ghar Yeh Meraa Ghar (2001)
- Bas Itna Sa Khwaab Hai
- Jodi No.1 as Bedi
- Fiza
- Vaastav: The Reality (1999) as Chandrakant Kumar a.k.a. "Dedh Footiya"
- Baaghi (2000) as Chakku
- Deewaar (2004)
- Indian (2001)
- Ek Aur Ek Gyaarah
- Ek Pyaar Ka Nagma Hai
- Love Recipe (2012)
- Chaar Deewane Aur Ek Deewani Bhi (2012)

=== Television shows ===
- My Name Ijj Lakhan (2019) as Lucky Bhai - Sony SAB
- Ghum Hai Kisikey Pyaar Meiin (2020;2021;2022;2023) as Inspector Kamal Joshi - StarPlus
- Escaype live (2022)
- Tujya Ishqacha Naadkhula (2021) as ACP Gautam Salvi
- Udne Ki Aasha, Paresh Deshmukh (2024–present) - StarPlus
- CID as Superintendent Omkar Sawant (2025) - Sony Entertainment Television

=== Marathi plays ===
- Lochya zaala re
- Rangya Rangila Re
- Chamatkar
- Gholat Ghol
- Teen Payanchi Sharyat
- Circuit House

== Awards and nominations ==
=== Filmfare Awards ===
- 2000: Nominated, Best Supporting Actor for Vaastav: The Reality
- Filmfare Marathi Awards Nominated Filmfare Award for Best Supporting Actor – Marathi For film Ye Re Ye Re Paisa 2
