= Tera Mera Saath Rahen =

2001 Indian film by Mahesh Manjrekar

- Directed by: Mahesh Manjrekar
- Story by: Deepak Kulkarni; Mahesh V. Manjrekar
- Produced by: N.R. Pachisia; Sunil Saini
- Starring: Ajay Devgn; Dushyant Wagh; Sonali Bendre; Namrata Shirodkar
- Cinematography: Vijay Kumar Arora
- Edited by: V. N. Mayekar
- Music by: Anand Raj Anand
- Release date: 16 November 2001
- Country: India
- Language: Hindi

Tera Mera Saath Rahen is a 2001 Indian drama film directed by Mahesh V. Manjrekar. The film stars Ajay Devgn, Dushyant Wagh, Sonali Bendre and Namrata Shirodkar.

== Plot ==
Raj Dixit (Ajay Devgn) is a respectable, ordinary man who lives with his younger brother Rahul (Dushyant Wagh). Suman (Namrata Shirodkar) and her parents (Shivaji Satam and Reema Lagoo) are his neighbours; at times, Suman's parents are like surrogate parents to him. The obstacle in Rahul's life is not his physical disability, cerebral palsy, but his overwhelming dependence on Raj. Suman is in love with Raj and declares her feelings openly. Raj needs a wife who would be willing to accept Rahul as part of her life. After Raj ignores her feelings, Suman begins dating someone else in the neighbourhood, much to the chagrin of her parents, and eventually leaves home.

Khanna (Prem Chopra) takes advantage of Raj's quiet personality and asks him to marry his niece, Madhuri Khanna (Sonali Bendre). Raj soon accepts the proposal and develops a relationship with Madhuri. Raj explains to Madhuri that their relationship leaves little room for them to grow as lovers. Madhuri believes that Rahul should be sent to a special school, which Raj strongly opposes. Madhuri ends the relationship and begins to avoid Raj.

After looking after Rahul for 15 years, Raj grows tired and wishes to have a normal family life. He changes his mind and admits Rahul to a special school. Raj and Madhuri rekindle their relationship; however, Raj begins to miss Rahul, which adversely affects his work. Meanwhile, Suman returns home after some time away. In the end, Raj, Madhuri, and Rahul live together happily.

== Cast ==
- Ajay Devgan as Raj Dixit
- Dushyant Wagh as Rahul Dixit, Raj's younger brother
- Sonali Bendre as Madhuri Khanna
- Namrata Shirodkar as Suman Gupta
- Prem Chopra as Mr. Khanna
- Anand Abhyankar
- Kishore Nandalaskar
- Shivaji Satam as Mr. Gupta, Suman's father
- Reema Lagoo as Janki Gupta, Suman's mother
- Sayaji Shinde
- Swapnil Kamble as Mr. Amit Chauhan

== Soundtrack ==
Music by Anand Raj Anand. Lyrics by Sameer.

#	Title	Singer(s)
1	"Pehli Nazar"	Udit Narayan, Alka Yagnik
2	"Jumbo Jet"	Atul Kale
3	"Dil Wahi Bekaraar Hota Hai"	Udit Narayan, Alka Yagnik
4	"Main Sochon"	Hariharan, Alka Yagnik
5	"Dum Dum Diga Diga"	Atul Kale, Bela Shende
6	"Tera Mera Saath Rahen"	Udit Narayan, Alka Yagnik
7	"Hathon Ki Lakeeron Mein"	Udit Narayan, Alka Yagnik
8	"Haqh Jata De"	Sukhwinder Singh, Hema Sardesai
9	"Tadpati Hai Tarsati Hai"	Udit Narayan, Alka Yagnik
10	"Tujh Se Bichad Ke"	Udit Narayan
