= Shivaji Satam =

Indian actor (born 1950)

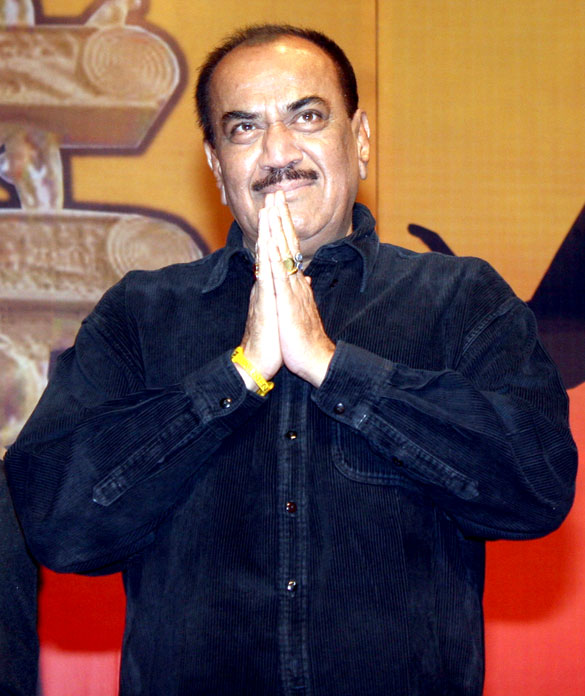
- Satam at Babasaheb Ambedkar Awards in 2012
- Born: 21 April 1950 (age 76); Devgad taluka, Sindhudurg District, India
- Education: S.H. Kelkar College, Devgad
- Occupation: Actor
- Years active: 1980–present
- Known for: ACP Pradyuman (C.I.D.)
- Spouse: Aruna Satam (m. 1976; died 2000)
- Children: 2
- Relatives: Madhura Velankar (daughter–in–law)

Shivaji Satam (born 21 April 1950) is an Indian television and film actor. He is best known for his role as ACP Pradyuman in the detective television series CID. He is recipient of two Maharashtra State Film Awards. He is honoured with the V. Shantaram Lifetime Achievement Award, Maharashtra's highest award in the field of Marathi cinema.

== Early life and education ==
Shivaji Satam attended school at the Antonio D'Souza High School, Byculla, Mumbai, later boarding at the Barnes High School, Devlali. He then returned to Mumbai to study at Maharshi Dayanand College.

== Career ==
He is best known for his role as ACP Pradyuman on the TV series C.I.D. on SET India. A former bank official and Inspection Officer, he has appeared in Hindi and Marathi films, including Vaastav, Ghulam-E-Mustafa, Kurukshetra, Fiza, Yeshwant, China Gate, Taxi No. 9211, Nayak, Jis Desh Me Ganga Reheta Hai, Sooryavansham, Hu Tu Tu. In Marathi, he has received recognition through movies like Uttarayan.

Shivaji made his screen debut in 1980 in the TV series Rishte-Naate. In 1988, he appeared in the series Famous Trials of India. He played a role in the Marathi show Ek Shunya Shunya. He then appeared in numerous serials and films and became noted for appearing in the Hindi films Vaastav, Kurukshetra and 100 Days.

== Awards ==
Shivaji has been nominated for the Best Actors award for Star Screen Awards for Ghulam-E-Mustafa.

== Filmography ==
=== Films ===
Year	Film	Role	Language
1988	Pestonjee	Doctor	Hindi
1991	100 Days	Police Inspector	Hindi
1995	English August	Govind Sathe	English
1995	Aai	Mr. Bawadekar	Marathi
1997	Yeshwant	Police Inspector	Hindi
1997	Ghulam-E-Mustafa	Dayanand Dixit	Hindi
1998	Vinashak – Destroyer	Police Inspector Harinaam	Hindi
1998	Yugpurush	Paresh Kumar	Hindi
1998	China Gate	Gopinath	Hindi
1998	Wajood	Police Commissioner of Mumbai	Hindi
1999	Hu Tu Tu	Amol Barve	Hindi
1999	Daag: The Fire	Municipal Commissioner Satyaprakash	Hindi
1999	Sooryavansham	Ramesh	Hindi
1999	Vaastav	Namdev	Hindi
2000	Split Wide Open	Shiv – Leela's father	English
2000	Pukar	Col. Rana	Hindi
2000	Baaghi	Prof Vidyashankar Pandey	Hindi
2000	Nidaan	Aniruddha Nadkarni	Hindi
2000	Jis Desh Mein Ganga Rehta Hain	Ganga's father	Hindi
2000	Kurukshetra	Sambhaji Yadav	Hindi
2001	Jodi No. 1	Host of India's Most Wanted	Hindi
2001	Ehsaas: The Feeling		Hindi
2001	Nayak: The Real Hero	Mr.Ghatge Manjari's father	Hindi
2002	Ek Hoti Vadi	Doctor	Marathi
2002	Pitaah	Station Master	Hindi
2002	Hathyar	Namdev	Hindi
2002	Filhaal...	Dr Surve	Hindi
2003	Pran Jaye Par Shaan Na Jaye	Pandhari (Sheela's Father)	Hindi
2003	Sssshhh...	Commissioner Kamath	Hindi
2004	Bardaasht	Commissioner	Hindi
2004	Garv: Pride and Honour	Commissioner Yeshwant Deshpande	Hindi
2004	Rakht	Drishti's Father	Hindi
2004	AK-47	Rudra Pratap's father	Hindi
2005	Uttarayan	Raghuveer Rajadhyaksh or Raghu	Marathi
2005	Viruddh	Bharucha	Hindi
2006	Taxi No. 9211	Arjun Bajaj	Hindi
2008	De Dhakka	Suryabhan Jadhav	Marathi
2010	Haapus	Anna Gurav	Marathi
2015	Karbonn		Hindi
2018	Me Shivaji Park	Dr. Rustom Mistry	Marathi
2019	Wedding Cha Shinema	Prakash's Father	Marathi
2021	Haseen Dilruba	Ajinkya	Hindi
2022	De Dhakka 2	Suryabhan Jadhav/Tatya	Marathi
2023	Bamboo	M.N. Bhasme	Marathi
2024	Juna Furniture	Magistrate	Marathi

=== Television ===
Year	Show	Language	Role
1980	Rishte-Naate	Hindi	
1988	Famous Trials of India	Hindi	
1988	Ek Shunya Shunya	Marathi	Inspector Shrikant Patkar
1995	A Mouthful Of Sky	Hindi	
1997	Aahat	Hindi	Chauhan (Episode 70/71-Hunter), Insp. Vijay (Episode106/107-Shakti)
1998–2018; 2024–2025	CID	Hindi	ACP Pradyuman
2010–2014	Adaalat	Hindi	ACP Pradyuman
2014	Taarak Mehta Ka Ooltah Chashmah	Hindi	ACP Pradyuman
2024	Murder In Mahim	Hindi	Dhular

== Awards and nominations ==
Year	Awards	Category	Work	Result	Ref
1998	Star Screen Awards	Best Supporting Actor	Ghulam-E-Mustafa	Nominated	
2001	Star Screen Awards	Best Supporting Actor	Nidaan	Nominated	
2000	Kalashree Awards	Character Actor	Vaastav: The Reality	Won	
2001	Maharashtra State Film Awards	Best Actor	Ek Hoti Vaadi	Won	
2002	Indian Telly Awards	Fan Favorite Actor	CID	Won	
2003	Indian Telly Awards	Fan Favorite Actor	CID	Won	
2004	Indian Telly Awards	Fan Favorite Actor	CID	Nominated	
2004	Maharashtra State Film Awards	Best Actor	Uttarayan	Won	
2012	Gold Awards	Best Actor - Critics	CID	Won	
2021	Nickelodeon Kids' Choice Awards India	Favorite Actor	CID	Nominated	
2024	Maharashtra State Film Awards	V. Shantaram Lifetime Achievement Award	—N/a	Honoured	
