= Vaastav: The Reality =

1999 Indian film by Mahesh Manjrekar

- Theatrical release poster
- Directed by: Mahesh Manjrekar
- Screenplay by: Mahesh Manjrekar
- Story by: Mahesh Manjrekar
- Dialogue by: Imtiyaz Husain
- Produced by: Deepak Nikalje
- Starring: Sanjay Dutt; Namrata Shirodkar; Mohnish Bahl; Shivaji Satam; Reema Lagoo; Paresh Rawal; Sanjay Narvekar
- Narrated by: Reema Lagoo
- Cinematography: Vijay Kumar Arora
- Edited by: V. N. Mayekar
- Music by: Songs: Jatin–Lalit; Rahul Ranade; Background Score: Sandeep Chowta
- Production company: Adishakti Films
- Release date: 7 October 1999
- Running time: 144 minutes
- Country: India
- Language: Hindi

Vaastav: The Reality is a 1999 Indian Hindi-language action film written and directed by Mahesh Manjrekar in his Bollywood directorial debut, and starring Sanjay Dutt, Namrata Shirodkar, and Sanjay Narvekar in lead roles, with Mohnish Behl, Paresh Rawal, Reema Lagoo and Shivaji Satam in supporting roles.

Vaastav was promoted with the tagline "The Reality", referring to the harsh realities of life in the Mumbai underworld. The film is said to be loosely based on the life of Mumbai underworld gangster Chhota Rajan.

Released on 7 October 1999, Vaastav: The Reality received positive reviews from critics, with major praise directed towards Dutt's performance, which is widely considered as his career-best. It emerged as a major commercial success at the domestic and overseas box-office.

At the 45th Filmfare Awards, Vaastav: The Reality received 6 nominations, including Best Film, Best Director (Manjrekar), Best Supporting Actor (Narvekar) and Best Supporting Actress (Lagoo), and won 2 awards – Best Actor (Dutt) and Filmfare–Sony Award (Manjrekar).

Dutt's performance received universal critical acclaim and was unanimously regarded by critics amongst one of Indian cinema's most memorable onscreen characters. Over the years, it has become a cult film.

The film was remade into Telugu as Bhavani (2000), in Kannada as Bhagavan Dada (2000) and in Tamil language as Don Chera (2006). It was followed by the 2002 sequel Hathyar. In 2013, it was dubbed in Bhojpuri as Tohar Ko Thok Debe (I will shoot you).

== Plot ==
Raghunath Namdev Shivalkar, alias "Raghu", and his best friend "Dedh Footiya" struggle to find employment in Mumbai. Raghu lives in a chawl with his father Namdev, a former mill worker, his mother Shanta, and his unemployed graduate brother Vijay. Showing no interest in academics, Raghu and Dedh Footiya open a pav bhaji stall. The business succeeds until the brother of a local gangster, Fracture Bandya, frequently visits the stall in a drunken state and violently assaults Dedh Footiya. Pushed to their limit, Raghu and Dedh Footiya retaliate and accidentally kill him.

Now fugitives, the duo seeks the assistance of their childhood friend, Sub-Inspector Kishore Kadam, who connects them with Vitthal Kaanya, a rival gang lord willing to offer protection. Fracture Bandya attempts to trap and murder them through a treacherous meeting arranged by a middleman named Suleiman Bhai. However, Raghu and Dedh Footiya intercept the plot and eliminate Fracture Bandya instead, formally embedding themselves in the Mumbai underworld.

Raghu quickly rises to become a feared hitman under Vitthal Kaanya, with Dedh Footiya serving as his primary accomplice. Their efficiency helps Kaanya dominate the city's criminal empire. Recognizing Raghu's lethal utility, Home Minister Babban Rao Kadam bypasses the gang hierarchy and recruits him directly for high-level political assassinations. Raghu accepts, ignoring the warnings of Kishore, who nevertheless continues to leak police intelligence to keep his friend alive.

The turf war intensifies when the remaining members of the Fracture gang assassinate Vitthal Kaanya. They launch a follow-up hit on Raghu during Dedh Footiya's father's funeral, missing Raghu but severely injuring his father. In a calculated counter-strike, Raghu tortures a corrupt officer, Inspector Rane, to learn that the Fracture gang is traveling to Shirdi. After executing Rane, Raghu and Dedh Footiya ambush the rival gang on a bridge, slaughtering them entirely and cementing Raghu as the city's undisputed underworld kingpin.

Despite his dominance, Raghu's position becomes precarious. Kishore repeatedly warns the duo that Babban Rao will dispose of them once their political utility expires. The dynamic shifts when Babban Rao orders Dedh Footiya to assassinate an innocent Muslim man, sparking deadly communal riots. Shortly after, during a forced land-acquisition dispute, an enraged Raghu murders an unyielding Parsi landowner, Parvez, who threatened to expose the operation. The public and political fallout forces Babban Rao's hand; to sever his ties to the underworld, the minister issues a direct "shoot-at-sight" warrant for the duo.

The police successfully ambush and kill Dedh Footiya in an encounter designed to bait Raghu. Alerted by Kishore that a permanent hit order is out on him, a paranoid Raghu goes into hiding. Realizing his wife Sonia and his parents are prime targets for both the police and Babban Rao's fixers, Raghu orchestrates a final meeting with the minister via Suleiman Bhai. Raghu assassinates Babban Rao to stop him from destroying more lives, though Suleiman Bhai is killed in the crossfire.

Hunted, cut off, and suffering a severe mental breakdown marked by violent hallucinations, a broken Raghu escapes to the safehouse he sent his family to. He begs his mother to save him from the approaching police, handing her his weapon and gold chains. Recalling a past moment when Raghu had playfully taught her how to handle a firearm, Shanta takes the gun, points it at her suffering son, and pulls the trigger to grant him mercy. The story concludes on a Mumbai beach during Raghu's annual funeral rites, where Shanta recounts the cautionary tale to her young grandson, Rohit, praying for the absolution of Raghu's sins.

== Cast ==
- Sanjay Dutt as Raghunath "Raghu" Namdev Shivalkar
- Namrata Shirodkar as Sonia "Sonu" Shivalkar, Raghu's wife
- Deepak Tijori as Sub-Inspector Kishore Kadam "Kisha"
- Sanjay Narvekar as Dedh Footiya
- Mohnish Bahl as Vijay Namdev Shivalkar, Raghu's brother
- Ekta Sohini as Pooja Shivalkar, Vijay's wife
- Shivaji Satam as Namdev Shivalkar, Raghu and Vijay's father
- Reema Lagoo as Shanta Shivalkar, Raghu and Vijay's mother
- Usha Nadkarni as Dedh Footiya's mother
- Paresh Rawal as Suleiman Basha aka Mandavali Baadshah
- Mohan Joshi as Home Minister Babban Rao Kadam
- Ashish Vidyarthi as Vitthal Kaanya
- Himani Shivpuri as Laxmi Akka
- Mahesh Manjrekar as himself in 'Apni Toh Nikal Padi'
- Jack Gaud as Fracture Bandya
- Ganesh Yadav as Chhota Fracture
- Kishore Nandlaskar as Dedh Footiya's father (drunkard)
- Achyut Potdar as an old Muslim man murdered by Dedh Footiya
- Anand Abhyankar as a Parsi Man (Parvez)
- Bharat Jadhav as Raghu's friend
- Makarand Anaspure as Raghu's friend
- Satish Rajwade as Satya
- Atul Kale as Bhopu
- Nilesh Divekar as Raghu's friend
- Dhananjay Mandrekar as Commissioner of Police
- Jayant Savarkar as Pandit
- Kashmera Shah as an item number "Jawani Se"
- Prabhakar as "Fracture" Bandya's henchman (uncredited)

== Soundtrack ==
All lyrics are written by Sameer except where noted.

| No. | Title | Music | Singer(s) | Length |
|---|---|---|---|---|
| 1. | "Meri Duniya Hai" | Jatin–Lalit | Kavita Krishnamurthy, Sonu Nigam | 04:40 |
| 2. | "Meri Duniya Hai (Male)" | Jatin–Lalit | Sonu Nigam | 04:38 |
| 3. | "Tere Pyar Ne (Male)" | Jatin–Lalit | Kumar Sanu | 04:36 |
| 4. | "Tere Pyar Ne (Female)" | Jatin–Lalit | Kavita Krishnamurthy | 04:37 |
| 5. | "Jawani Se Ab Jung" | Jatin–Lalit | Preetha Mazhumdar | 04:44 |
| 6. | "Apni To Nikal Padi" | Jatin–Lalit | Kumar Sanu, Atul Kale | 04:22 |
| 7. | "Har Taraf Hai Yeh Shor" | Jatin–Lalit | Vinod Rathod, Atul Kale | 05:41 |
| 8. | "Shendur Laal Chadhayo (Aarti)" | Jatin–Lalit | Ravindra Sathe | 03:14 |
| 9. | "Vaastav Theme - 1" | Rahul Ranade | Ravindra Sathe | 01:14 |
| 10. | "Vaastav Theme - 2" | Rahul Ranade | Ravindra Sathe | 01:09 |
| 11. | "Apni Maa" (lyrics by Gautam Joglekar) | Rahul Ranade | Shankar Mahadevan | 05:33 |

== Accolades ==
| Award (Note: Awards, festivals and organizations are in alphabetical order.) | Date of ceremony (Note: Date is linked to the article about the awards held that year, wherever possible.) | Category | Recipient(s) | Result | Ref. |
|---|---|---|---|---|---|
| Bollywood Movie Awards (Note: as Zee Gold Bollywood Awards.) | 8 June 2000 | Best Actor | Sanjay Dutt | Won | |
| Filmfare Awards | 13 February 2000 | Best Film | Vaastav: The Reality | Nominated | |
| Filmfare Awards | 13 February 2000 | Best Director | Mahesh Manjrekar | Nominated | |
| Filmfare Awards | 13 February 2000 | Filmfare – Sony Award | Mahesh Manjrekar | Won | |
| Filmfare Awards | 13 February 2000 | Best Actor | Sanjay Dutt | Won | |
| Filmfare Awards | 13 February 2000 | Best Supporting Actor | Sanjay Narvekar | Nominated | |
| Filmfare Awards | 13 February 2000 | Best Supporting Actress | Reema Lagoo | Nominated | |
| International Indian Film Academy Awards | 24 June 2000 | Best Film | Vaastav: The Reality | Nominated | |
| International Indian Film Academy Awards | 24 June 2000 | Best Director | Mahesh Manjrekar | Nominated | |
| International Indian Film Academy Awards | 24 June 2000 | Best Story | Mahesh Manjrekar | Nominated | |
| International Indian Film Academy Awards | 24 June 2000 | Best Actor | Sanjay Dutt | Won | |
| International Indian Film Academy Awards | 24 June 2000 | Best Supporting Actress | Reema Lagoo | Nominated | |
| International Indian Film Academy Awards | 24 June 2000 | Best Performance in a Negative Role | Mohan Joshi | Nominated | |
| International Indian Film Academy Awards | 24 June 2000 | Best Editing | V. N. Mayekar | Won | |
| Screen Awards | 23 January 2000 | Best Actor | Sanjay Dutt | Won | |
| Screen Awards | 23 January 2000 | Best Supporting Actor | Sanjay Narvekar | Nominated | |
| Screen Awards | 23 January 2000 | Best Performance in a Negative Role | Mohan Joshi | Nominated | |
| Screen Awards | 23 January 2000 | Best Story | Mahesh Manjrekar | Nominated | |
| Screen Awards | 23 January 2000 | Best Screenplay | Mahesh Manjrekar | Nominated | |
| Zee Cine Awards | 11 March 2000 | Best Director | Mahesh Manjrekar | Nominated | |
| Zee Cine Awards | 11 March 2000 | Best Technical Director | Mahesh Manjrekar | Won | |
| Zee Cine Awards | 11 March 2000 | Best Screenplay | Mahesh Manjrekar | Won | |
| Zee Cine Awards | 11 March 2000 | Best Action | Raam Shetty | Nominated | |
| Zee Cine Awards | 11 March 2000 | Best Make Up Artist | Hemchandra Sawant | Nominated | |

== Reception ==
Reviewing the film for Rediff.com, Suparn Verma compared its theme to Hollywood films Scarface (1983), The Godfather (1972), and Indian films such as Satya (1998), Nayakan (1987) and Agneepath (1990). He felt the film offered "no new insight into the underworld" and added that it was "fast-paced and taut at times". However, he felt the film was "well shot and edited" and criticized the "lengthy dialogues". He concluded commending the acting performance of Sanjay Dutt and called it "one of the best performances of his career". He added, "From an easy-going guy to a broken man -- the role is essayed with great care by him, maintaining a consistency throughout." Mukhtar Anjoom of Deccan Herald felt Dutt, who looked "terrific", couldn't "hold the excitement for long" due to the "shaky screenplay".
