= Pitaah =

- Poster
- Directed by: Mahesh Manjrekar
- Written by: Mahesh Manjrekar; K. K. Singh (dialogues)
- Screenplay by: Teja
- Story by: Teja
- Produced by: Avinash Adik
- Starring: Sanjay Dutt; Jackie Shroff; Nandita Das; Om Puri; Mink Brar
- Cinematography: Vijay Kumar Arora
- Edited by: V. N. Mayekar
- Music by: Songs: Anand Raj Anand; Score: Rahul Ranade
- Production company: Aryamann Films
- Release date: 4 January 2002 (India)
- Running time: 127 minutes
- Country: India
- Language: Hindi

Pitaah (transl. Father) is a 2002 Indian Hindi-language action drama film directed by Mahesh Manjrekar and produced by Avinash Adik. Inspired by the 1989 novel A Time to Kill, which was also adapted into a 1996 film of the same name, it stars Sanjay Dutt, Jackie Shroff, Nandita Das and Om Puri.

The film was released on 4 January 2002 and bombed at the box office.

== Plot ==
A small town in rural India gets to witness a confrontation between two fathers, one a rich, powerful, and cruel Zamindar Thakur Avadh Narayan Singh who wants the man who filed a police complaint against his two sons to be killed immediately. The other is Rudra, a poor laborer employed by Avadh, who wants justice when he finds out that his nine-year-old daughter, Durga, has been beaten and brutally raped by Avadh's sons, Bachhu, and Bhola.

His quest for justice is made harder due to a corrupt doctor, willing to change his medical report after he is bribed appropriately; and Police Inspector, Ramnarayan Bhardwaj, who is willing to drop any charges against Avadh's sons provided he gets his "dues" from the Thakur. These hardships force Rudra to take matters into his own hands and he kills the Thakur's sons when they arrive for their court date.

Rudra confronts the Thakur and apologises for his actions, he agrees to surrender himself to the police in return for his family's safety. However, Avadh refuses to give in and Rudra kills his men. The Thakur is eventually killed by Rudra's wife Paro. Rudra then surrenders himself to the police and is given a six-month sentence. He is eventually released and reunites with his family, finally at peace.

== Cast ==
- Sanjay Dutt as Rudra
- Jackie Shroff as Ramnarayan Bharadwaj, police officer (daroga)
- Nandita Das as Paro
- Om Puri as Thakur Avadh Narayan Singh
- Mita Vasisht as Thakurain
- Anupama Verma as Thakur's daughter
- Siddharth Ray as Bacchu, Thakur's eldest son
- Vineet Kumar Singh as Bhola, Thakur's youngest son
- Sachin Khedekar as Shiva
- Salil Ankola as Krishna, Shiva's Son and Thakur's daughter's love interest
- Atul Kale as Villager Bhudhwa
- Anjan Srivastav as Senior Doctor Nekchand
- Ankush Chaudhari as Junior Doctor Dayal
- Shivaji Satam as Railway Station Master Rana Jung Bahadur
- Mink Brar as Naina
- Tanvi Hegde as Durga, 'Muniya' (Rudra's daughter)
- Sagar Thawani as Lav, Durga's brother
- Samrat Thawani as Kush, Durga's brother
- Kalpana Pandit as Special Appearance (Song 'Meri Jawani')
- Nilesh Diwekar as Bheema

== Soundtrack ==
The film's music was composed by Anand Raj Anand.

#	Title	Singer(s)
1	"Shloka"	
2	"Pitaah"	Udit Narayan
3	"Nadiya Kinare Aao"	Sonu Nigam, Kavita Krishnamurthy
4	"Rama Bachaye"	Anuradha Sriram
5	"Sau Baar Janam Nahi"	Sukhwinder Singh
6	"Meri Jawani"	Sunidhi Chauhan
7	"Humko To Ishq"	Kavita Krishnamurthy
8	"Putra Pratishtha"	Rahul Ranade, Ravindra Saathe

== Reception ==
A critic from The Times of India wrote that ". in short, pitaah is such a monotonous monotone about the strength of a father, it sends you rushing for a break. this, despite the snatches of seasoned performances by both sanjay dutt and nandita das". A critic from Rediff.com wrote that "Pitaah does not live up to the mark".
