= Gaon Thor Pudhari Chor =

- गाव थोर पुढारी चोर
- Directed by: Pitambar Kale
- Screenplay by: Pitambar Kale; Laxmikant Vispute
- Story by: Aaba Gaykwad
- Produced by: Mangesh Doiphode
- Starring: Digambar Naik; Prema Kiran; Chetan Dalvi; Siya Patil; Kishor Nandalskar; Kanchan Bhor
- Cinematography: Shivaji Kale
- Music by: Nandu Honap
- Production company: Mangesh Movies
- Release date: 17 February 2017
- Country: India
- Language: Marathi

Gaon Thor Pudhari Chor (transl. Village great, leader thief) is 2017 Indian Marathi-language film directed by Pitambar Kale and produced by Mangesh Doiphode under banner of Mangesh Movies. Gaon Thor Pudhari Chor was released on 17 February 2017.

This new film presents a light comedy on some amazing political moves in a simplest possible ways.

== Cast ==
- Digambar Naik
- Prema Kiran
- Chetan Dalvi
- Siya Patil
- Kanchan Bhor
- Prakash Dotre
- Jairaj Nair
- Anshumala Patil
- Datta Thorat
- Parag Chaudhari
- Sunil Godabole
- Arun Khandagale
- Suresh Deshmukh
- Somanath Shelar

== Plot ==
The film's screenplay does not spare the ruling party as well as opposition party, presenting their gimmicks to remain in limelight, while pulling each other's legs. In short, all the politicians will be target in this film. And the makers of this film are confident that their film would offer total entertain to the Marathi audience.

== Production ==
The film is produced by Mangesh Doiphode under his own production company Mangesh Movies Enterprise. The film is written by Pitambar Kale and Laxmikant Vispute.

== Soundtrack ==
Music given by Nadu Honap

No.	Title	Singers	Lyricists	Reference
1.	"Gaon Thor Pudhari Chor"	Sudesh Bhosle and Neha Rajpal	Babasaheb Saudagar	
2.	"Name Dharun Mara Shikka Song"	Rohit Raut, Siddhant Bhonsle and Neha Rajpal	Aaba Gaikwad	
3.	"Facebook Open Kara"	Vaishali Samant	Aaba Gaikwad	
