= Ehsaas: The Feeling =

2001 film by Mahesh Manjrekar

- Directed by: Mahesh Manjrekar
- Written by: Mahesh Manjrekar
- Produced by: Pravin Shah
- Starring: Sunil Shetty; Neha Bajpai
- Cinematography: Vijay Kumar Arora
- Edited by: V. N. Mayekar
- Music by: Anand Raj Anand; Milind Saagar; Prajwal Joseph & Anand Kurhekar
- Production company: Time Magnetics
- Release date: 30 November 2001
- Running time: 117 mins
- Country: India
- Language: Hindi

Ehsaas: The Feeling is a 2001 Indian Hindi-language film starring Sunil Shetty and Neha Bajpai.

== Plot ==
After the death of his wife, Aditi, Ravi Naik must look after his only child – a son – on his own. He brings up his son, Rohan, in a very strict and disciplined atmosphere, so much so that his son starts to resent him and his mannerisms. His immediate neighbors, Antara Pandit and her mom, are critical of the way Ravi handles his son and suggest that he adopt a more lenient view. But Ravi ignores this advice. All he wants is to get Rohan to excel as an athlete and win the forthcoming athletic event.

== Cast ==
- Suniel Shetty as Ravi Naik
- Neha Bajpai as Antara Pandit
- Kiron Kher as Antara's mother-in-law
- Mahesh Manjrekar as Michael
- Rakhi Sawant as Maria
- Mayank Tandon as Rohan Naik
- Shivaji Satam
- Shakti Kapoor as Principal
- Kishore Nandlaskar
- Anand Raj Anand
- Sunidhi Chauhan
- Sanjay Narvekar

== Music ==
1. "Kuch Kehna Hai Meri Bhul Huvi" – Udit Narayan, Aditya Narayan
2. "Yeh Din Bachpan Ke" – Aditya Narayan
3. "Juhi Ne Dil Manga Mai Nakko Bola" – Atul Kale, Vaishali Samant
4. "Tumse Milkar Hua Hai Ehsaas" – K. K., Bela Shende
5. "Ek Bar Pyar Mujhe De" – Sonu Nigam, Sunidhi Chauhan
6. "Yeh Kaisa Ehsas Hai" – Sunidhi Chauhan, Sonu Nigam
7. "Zindagi Ek Daud Hai" – Shankar Mahadevan
