= Nidaan =

- Directed by: Mahesh Manjrekar
- Written by: Gautam Joglekar (dialogue); Mahesh Manjrekar (screenplay)
- Produced by: R. V. Pandit
- Starring: Shivaji Satam; Reema Lagoo; Nisha Bains; Shagufta Ali; Sunil Barve
- Cinematography: Vijay Kumar Arora
- Edited by: V. N. Mayekar
- Music by: Rahul Ranade
- Release date: 28 July 2000
- Running time: 146 minutes
- Country: India
- Language: Hindi

Nidaan is a 2000 Indian family drama film directed by Mahesh Manjrekar and produced by R. V. Pandit. Shivaji Satam, Reema Lagoo, Nisha Bains, and Sunil Barve appeared in the main roles. The plot involved the ordeal of an AIDS-infected patient in getting her disease treated against the backdrop of India's "substandard medical facilities."

== Plot ==
Soumya Nadkarni lives a luxurious life in Mumbai with her parents, Anirudh and Suhasini. A second-year Science student at I.B. Institute, she admires Bollywood star Sanjay Dutt. After overcoming a childhood appendectomy and a fear of needles, she donates blood to support her boyfriend, Ninad Kamat, during a campaign. However, she falls seriously ill during her final exams, and Dr. S.D. Potnis suspects Malaria. After two months of fever, Anirudh discovers Soumya is HIV positive and shares the news with Suhasini, who decides to keep it a secret. When Soumya learns the truth, she resolves to live normally and expresses her desire to marry Ninad, leading to significant challenges for the Kamat family and distancing from friends, as well as her denial of admission to her preferred hospital.

== Cast ==
- Shivaji Satam as Anirudh Nadkarni
- Reema Lagoo as Suhasini A. 'Suhas' Nadkarni
- Nisha Bains as Soumya A. Nadkarni
- Sunil Barve as Ninad S. Kamat
- Mohan Joshi as Dr. Dhawan
- Shagufta Ali as Aditi Dhawan
- Sunil Shende as Dr. S.D. Potnis
- Shama Deshpande as Veena S. Kamat
- Dilip Prabhavalkar as Shrikant Kamat
- Sanjay Dutt as himself (cameo appearance)

== Songs ==
Nidaan

Soundtrack album by Rahul Ranande
- Released: 20 May 2000
- Genre: Feature film soundtrack
- Length: 51:58
- Label: Rajshri Music

Nidaan (Original Motion Picture Soundtrack)
No.	Title	Singer(s)	Length
1.	"Aaja Re Chanda"	Ravindra Sathe, Kavita Krishnamurthy
2.	"Waqt Ki Kimat"	Nandu Bhende, Sagarika
3.	"Hum Aru Tum"	Kavita Krishnamurthy, Suresh Wadkar
4.	"O Kartar"	Sanjeev Abhyankar
5.	"Agar Ho Pyar"	Suresh Wadkar
6.	"Aaja Re Chanda" (Girl Version)	Sagarika
7.	"Aaja Re Chanda" (Sad Version)	Ravindra Sathe, Kavita Krishnamurthy
8.	"Aaja Re Chanda" (Instrumental)	Rahul Ranande
9.	"Title Music"	Rahul Ranande
10.	"Blood Bank"	Rahul Ranande
11.	"End Title"	Rahul Ranande
12.	"Pehla Din Hai College Ka"	Manohar Shetty
13.	"Yeh Hain Prem"	Milind Ingle

== Release ==
The film was released on 27 July 2000. It was also dubbed and released in Tamil as Uyirin Uyire.
