= Hathyar (2002 film) =

2002 Indian film by Mahesh Manjrekar

- DVD Cover
- Directed by: Mahesh Manjrekar
- Story by: Mahesh Manjrekar
- Produced by: Ganesh Jain; Ratan Jain
- Starring: Sanjay Dutt; Shilpa Shetty; Sharad Kapoor
- Narrated by: Sachin Khedekar
- Cinematography: Vijay Kumar Arora
- Edited by: V. N. Mayekar
- Music by: Songs: Anand Raj Anand; Nitin Raikwar; Rahul Ranade; Background Score: Ranjit Barot
- Distributed by: Venus Records & Tapes
- Release date: 18 October 2002
- Country: India
- Language: Hindi
- Budget: ₹7 crore
- Box office: ₹9.63 crore

Hathyar: Face to Face with Reality (transl. Weapon) is a 2002 Indian Hindi-language action political thriller film directed by Mahesh Manjrekar. The film is a sequel to Vaastav (1999). It stars Sanjay Dutt, Shilpa Shetty and Sharad Kapoor. Hathyar begins where Vaastav had ended and focuses on the son of Raghu bhai, Boxer bhai, also played by Dutt.

== Plot ==
The film opens with Rohit Shivalkar (Sanjay Dutt) being shot at by some gangsters including his aide Pakya (Sharad Kapoor). As the doctors operate on him, the story begins from the past.

Rohit is ostracized since his childhood because of the stigma attached to him due to his father Raghunath (Sanjay Dutt) who was a gangster, by all except Munna (Sachin Khedekar) who is an orphan. Rohit's grandfather Namdev (Shivaji Satam) is now a drunkard who later dies of liver failure. Rohit's mother, Sonu (Namrata Shirodkar) is forced to resort to prostitution again for money, seeking Chaudhary's (Viju Khote) help. As Rohit grows up, he earns a reputation in his college days for being a good boxer, until defeating Amar Rane (Inder Kumar) in an inter-college championship. Amar learns how Raghu had murdered his father who was a police officer and presses Rohit on false charges of drug possession with his uncle's (Pramod Moutho) help, harassing him in custody despite Rohit's innocence. Rohit also learns the truth about his mother from Amar and he spots her with Chaudhary, which infuriates him, causing her to end her own life. Fed-up of Amar calling his mother a whore, Rohit drunkenly kills him brutally and gets imprisoned. His grandmother, Shanta (Reema Lagoo) reprimands him as she informs him about his mother's suicide when she visits him in the prison.

Years later, Hasan Bhai (Shakti Kapoor) remembers the time Raghu had eliminated the Fracture gang, as he faces trouble with the gang's sons, and he bails Rohit out. Rohit, just like his father, makes his way up the ranks in the Mumbai underworld, earning the name "Boxer Bhai". He's also in a relationship with his father's friend Bhopu's (Atul Kale) daughter Gauri (Shilpa Shetty), who is enduring a physically abusive marriage. Rohit eventually snatches her out of this abusive relationship and remarries her. They eventually give birth to a daughter, Shanti.

Meanwhile, Rohit is also approached by ruling party power broker Digamber Patil (Gulshan Grover) who offers him to fight for elections to get into politics as a corporator. Rohit reluctantly accepts and eventually wins the elections. DCP Kishore Kadam (Deepak Tijori), who is Rohit's guardian and Raghu's best friend warns Rohit about the new honest Chief minister and advises him to mend his ways before it is too late.

One day, Gauri's friend Jyoti and her husband Shekhar, who is a police officer get transferred to Mumbai. Shekhar turns out to be the informer of Fracture Nagya (Anup Soni). Rohit eventually finds out after a few of his men get killed by the Fracture gang due to his info. Rohit kills Shekhar. Angered, Gauri moves to Munna's house for a while. Munna persuades Gauri to go back to Rohit with the help of another police officer who tells her that Shekhar was Nagya's informer. Gauri decides to return but Rohit kills Munna after being misled by Pakya that Munna and Gauri are having an affair. Gauri then deserts him, and Rohit is devastated by his mistakes. The plot returns to the start where Rohit miraculously survives the attack.

It is then revealed that Patil had conspired with Nagya against Rohit and was double-crossed by Pakya due to Rohit's powerful political status and a personal score that had to be settled with the Fracture family. A vengeful Rohit recovers and sets out to eliminate Patil, Nagya and Pakya. Rohit kills Nagya and then kills Pakya at a guest house, enraged by Pakya's betrayal due to a hefty bribe given by Patil to him. Subsequently, Rohit bludgeons Patil in a cricket stadium and goes in hiding.

Rohit is now the most wanted criminal in the city and the Chief Minister gives "shoot to kill" orders to Kishore. Rohit locates Gauri and asks for forgiveness from her and says that he was forced into a life of crime because of his father's past. He tells Gauri to take Shanti far away from the city, away from his dark past, as he commits suicide. Gauri finally decides to leave the city with Shanti. The film ends with a note on the irony of destiny as the credits roll.

== Cast ==
- Sanjay Dutt as
  - Rohit "Boxer Bhai" Shivalkar
    - Abhijeet Satam as Rohit (in his college days)
  - Raghunath “Raghu” Shivalkar, Rohit’s father (Flashback appearance)
- Shilpa Shetty as Gauri
- Sharad Kapoor as Pakya
- Shakti Kapoor as Hasan Bhai
- Sachin Khedekar as Munna
- Gulshan Grover as Digamber Patil
- Shivaji Satam as Namdev, Rohit's grandfather
- Reema Lagoo as Shanta, Rohit's grandmother
- Deepak Tijori as DCP Kishore Kadam
- Pramod Moutho as Inspector Sudhakar Rane
- Inder Kumar as Amar Rane, Sudhakar's nephew
- Harsh Chhaya as Gautam Naik, Gauri's first husband
- Anup Soni as Fracture Nagya
- Pankaj Berry as Fracture Nagya's brother
- Namrata Shirodkar as Sonia Shivalkar "Sonu", Rohit's mother
- Atul Kale as Bhopu, Gauri's father
- Usha Nadkarni as Dedh Footiya's mother
- Resham Tipnis as Jyoti Deshmukh
- Sanjay Batra as Inspector Shekhar Jadhav, Jyoti's husband
- Vineet Kumar Singh as Aslam
- Sanjay Narvekar as Dedh Footiya (Flashback appearance)
- Bharat Jadhav as Raghu's friend (Flashback appearance)
- Nilesh Divekar as Raghu's friend (Flashback appearance)
- Viju Khote as Chaudhary
- Uday Sabnis as MLA Madhukar Dilip Dixit
- Sandeep Kulkarni as MLA Kishan Rao Morey
- Jack Gaud as Fracture Bandya (photo only)
- Ashima Bhalla as an item number
- Baby Miloni as Shanti, Rohit and Gauri's daughter

== Soundtrack ==
No.	Title	Lyrics	Music	Singer(s)	Length
1.	"Chaha Tha Tumhe"	Dev Kohli	Anand Raj Anand	Alka Yagnik, Sanjay Dutt	5:00
2.	"Nazar Nazar"	Pravin Bhardwaj	Anand Raj Anand	Asha Bhosle, Mohammed Salamat	4:50
3.	"Ye Dil Deewana Hai" (not in film)	Pravin Bhardwaj	Anand Raj Anand	Udit Narayan, Alka Yagnik	5:25
4.	"Baat Hai Kamaal"	Anand Raj Anand	Anand Raj Anand	Jolly Mukherjee, Bali Brahmbhatt	3:54
5.	"Thamba Re Thamba"	Dev Kohli	Anand Raj Anand	Asha Bhosle, Mohammed Salamat	5:13
6.	"Boxer Bhai"	Nitin Raikwar	Nitin Raikwar	Vinod Rathod, Sudesh Bhosle, Nitin Raikwar	4:50
7.	"Nazar Nazar (Remix)"	Pravin Bhardwaj	Anand Raj Anand	Alisha Chinai, Mohammed Salamat	4:56
8.	"Shlok"	Sanjay Upadhye	Rahul Ranade	Ravindra Sathe	3:09

== Reception ==
Sukanya Verma of Rediff.com wrote,"In sum, Hathyar is like a shot in the dark. Aimless. It neither preaches nor entertains." Taran Adarsh of IndiaFM gave the film two out of five, writing, "On the whole, there's tremendous curiosity and anxiety to watch the sequel of VAASTAV. Although HATHYAR is a sincere attempt, comparisons with the predecessor are inevitable and in that respect, HATHYAR would meet with mixed reactions from cinegoers."
