= Praan Jaye Par Shaan Na Jaye =

- Theatrical release poster
- Directed by: Sanjay Jha
- Written by: Sanjay Pawar
- Screenplay by: Mahesh Manjrekar
- Produced by: Mahesh Manjrekar; Asoo Nihalani; Raj Lalchandani; Sagoon Wagh
- Starring: Aman Verma; Rinke Khanna; Dia Mirza; Raveena Tandon; Bharat Jadhav
- Narrated by: Vijay Raaz; Sushmita Sen
- Cinematography: Rajeev Shrivastava
- Edited by: Sarvesh Parab
- Music by: Daboo Malik; Nitin Raikwar (songs); Rahul Ranade (score)
- Release date: 2 May 2003
- Country: India
- Language: Hindi
- Budget: ₹3.25 crore
- Box office: ₹2.35 crore

Praan Jaye Par Shaan Na Jaye is a 2003 Indian Hindi-language black comedy film directed by Sanjay Jha which depicts various aspects of chawl culture in Mumbai. This film was co-produced by Raj Lalchandani, Mahesh Manjrekar, Asoo Nihlani and Sagoon Wagh. The film stars Aman Verma and Rinke Khanna.

== Plot ==
The film begins in Mumbai, where actress Sushmita Sen introduces Popatlal Chunnilal Garodia Chawl. A resident named Ganpat, a wise yet an unemployed man, introduces the diverse inhabitants living together despite daily hardships, such as standing in a long queue for water early morning or the youth, who always play cricket. When the landlord, Praveen Pitalwala, announces plans to demolish the building for his new commercial complex project, the residents band together and drive him away by throwing a bucket of water on him. Praveen sends a gangster named Munna Bhai Hatela to intimidate them, but the tenants throw him out as well.

Aman Joshi arrives at the chawl claiming to be a research student, writing a thesis on community life. Befriending Ganpat, Aman rents a room and integrates into the neighborhood. He develops romantic feelings for a resident named Suman and learns about the personal struggles of the tenants: Suman’s father suffers from post-traumatic stress disorder after his son was killed in a police encounter; Sheela endures marital abuse from her unemployed husband, Sayaji Rane; Saundarya struggles with low self-esteem due to social rejection and her bland looks; Dulaari, a housemaid who is constantly henpecked by her mother-in-law for not giving a son, as Dulaari already had given birth to 2 daughters and enduring an abusive marriage from her drunkard husband Ram Pyare; and Mona, a newcomer judged for being an escort, is defended by the chawl's women, who also gets reconciled with Milind, a man from the chawl who loves her dearly. Aman earns the community's trust and respect through his generosity, helping Saundarya gain confidence, gives her a makeover and gets her married to the resident Michael, (whom she has a crush on) paying the medical bills of an injured boy, and lending money to residents to improve their lives.

Praveen soon reveals that Aman was secretly his operative. The loans were a scheme to trap the residents in debt so they would be forced to vacate. Enraged by the betrayal, the residents confront Aman. Having witnessed their unity and resilience, Aman feels genuine remorse, confesses, and begs for forgiveness. The residents forgive him, and Aman severs ties with Praveen, promising to help protect the chawl and its members. The residents assemble to raise funds to repay the debt. Two residents, Laxmi and Mahendra stage a fake sati ritual to delay Praveen's visit and draw public and media attention to their plight and in the midst of this, Sayaji, who is now employed and requests Sheela to come back with him, thus changed his attitude and ways. While Mahendra is about to be killed, so that Laxmi would perform the ritual, angrily reprimands the media and public that it was all a ruse to save the chawl from the menacing Praveen, thus ending the charade. Meanwhile, Venkat, a resident who sells movie tickets, triples the pooled money through a blockbuster film screening, securing enough funds to clear the entire debt.

Aman contacts Praveen to announce that the debt will be paid in full. In a final act of retaliation, Praveen hires a sniper who fatally shoots Aman in front of the chawl members. Aman asks for their final forgiveness before dying, and confesses his love for Suman, to which the latter reciprocate as well. In the afterlife, Aman's soul looks over the chawl members, living their lives in peace and attempts to call out to Suman. A spiritual entity representing the R.K. Laxman's "The Common Man" comforts Aman, telling him that the middle class will go to any length to preserve their dignity and unity and it is their undying spirit, due to which the country thrives. Suman mourns Aman, remembering him tearfully as she walks back into the chawl.

In an epilogue, Ganpat breaks the fourth wall, remarking that the film lacks traditional storyline songs, and introduces an unrelated closing musical sequence featuring Munna Bhai Hatela and Sushmita Sen.

== Cast ==
- Aman Verma as Aman Joshi
- Rinke Khanna as Suman
- Raveena Tandon as Laxmi Rathore
- Namrata Shirodkar as Mona
- Dia Mirza as Saundarya
- Divya Dutta as Dulari
- Shweta Menon as Sheela Rane
- Sachin Khedekar as Praveen Pitalwala (alias Parveen Seth)
- Vijay Raaz as Ganpat (Narrator)
- Mahesh Manjrekar as Munna Bhai Hatela
- Sushmita Sen as herself (Narrator / Special Appearance)
- Shivaji Satam as Pandhari Sawant
- Swati Chitnis as Mrs. Sawant
- Sayaji Shinde as Sayaji Rane
- Vivek Shauq as Sukhwinder
- Bharat Jadhav as Mahendra Rathore
- Makarand Anaspure as Venkat
- Jitendra Joshi as Milind
- Sanjay Narvekar as Babban (special appearance)
- Atisha Naik as Elaichi
- Abhijeet Satam as Michael (Saundarya's crush)
- Pandharinath Kamble as Chitya

== Music ==
1. "Aye Aye Ya Mujhe Isse Pyaar Hua" – Daboo Malik, Vinod Rathod
2. "Hum Tere Sanam Na Hote" – Vinod Rathod, Alka Yagnik
3. "Chaalee Hamko Jaan Se Pyaaree Hai" – Vinod Rathod, Nitin Raikwar
4. "Kuch Nayi Nayi Wo Baat Thi" – Sonu Nigam
5. "Lagi Ye Lagi" – Vinod Rathod
6. "Loan De Baba" – Vinod Rathod
7. "Background Score" – Rahul Ranade
