= Kurukshetra (2000 film) =

- Directed by: Mahesh Manjrekar
- Written by: Mahesh Manjrekar
- Produced by: Pravin Shah
- Starring: Sanjay Dutt; Mahima Chaudhry; Om Puri; Mukesh Rishi; Shivaji Satam
- Cinematography: Vijay Kumar Arora
- Edited by: V.N. Mayekar
- Music by: Score: Amar Haldipur; Songs: Himesh Reshammiya; Sukhwinder Singh
- Release date: 10 November 2000
- Country: India
- Language: Hindi
- Budget: ₹87.5 million
- Box office: ₹198.7 million

Kurukshetra (transl. : Righteous war) is a 2000 Indian action drama film written and directed by Mahesh Manjrekar. It was released on 10 November 2000 and stars Sanjay Dutt, Mahima Chaudhry and Om Puri with Mukesh Rishi and Shivaji Satam in supporting roles.

== Plot ==
ACP Prithviraj Singh is an honest and brave police officer. The day he joins duty in Mumbai, he destroys all the illegal business of Iqbal Pasina. From that day onward, Iqbal Pasina starts admiring Prithviraj.

In his personal life, Prithviraj lives with his wife, Anjali and sister, Aarti. Aarti is in love with Sub-Inspector Avinash. Anjali is sad because "Prithvi", who once used to love her a lot, is now a totally different man, a man of law and duties. She lost her lover to the uniform.

One day, Chief Minister, Baburao Deshmukh's son Ambar and his friend Rohit, trap a girl named Gita Naik in a hotel room, and both of them rape her.

This brutal incident provokes the battle of "Kurukshetra."

The battle is fought between Baburao and Prithviraj. Babu Rao Deshmukh has money, power and government infrastructure, and Prithvi Raj Singh gets support from opposition leaders Sambhaji Yadav and Iqbal Pasina.

Sambhaji Yadav later betrays Prithviraj and joins hands with the Baburao. Finally, Prithviraj realizes that the law is helpless and kills both Baburao and Sambhaji Yadav to avenge the perpetrators of the rape incident and bring justice.

== Cast ==
- Sanjay Dutt as ACP Prithviraj Singh
- Mahima Chaudhry as Anjali Singh
- Om Puri as Chief Minister Baburao Deshmukh
- Mukesh Rishi as Iqbal Pasina
- Shivaji Satam as Sambhaji Yadav
- Rakhi Sawant as Geeta Naik
- Tina Rana as Aarti Singh
- Salil Ankola as Sub-Inspector Avinash
- Pramod Moutho as ACP Patwardhan
- Ganesh Yadav as Ambar B. Deshmukh
- Sayaji Shinde as Constable Gopinath Survey Patil "Gopi"
- Mahesh Anand as Anna Pillai
- Rajat Sharma as himself (guest appearance)
- Sukhwinder Singh as a special appearance in song "Banthan"
- Kashmera Shah as item number "Banthan"
- Suman Ranganathan as item number "Nahi Milega Aisa Ghaghra"

== Music ==
Kurukshetra

Soundtrack album by Himesh Reshammiya Sukhwinder Singh
- Released: September 2000
- Recorded: 2000
- Venue: Mumbai
- Genre: Feature film soundtrack
- Length: 40:00
- Label: Saregama
- Producer: Himesh Reshammiya

Himesh Reshammiya Sukhwinder Singh chronology
Kahin Pyaar Na Ho Jaaye (2000)	Kurukshetra (2000)	Dulhan Hum Le Jayenge (2000)

The music is composed by Himesh Reshammiya and Sukhwinder Singh. "Aap Ka Aana Dil Dhadkana" sets the romantic tone, featuring both instrumental and vocal versions. "Banthan Ke" is the energetic item number featuring Sukhwinder Singh & Sunidhi Chauhan.

#	Song	Singer(s)	Lyricist(s)
1.	"Aap Ka Aana Dil Dhadkana"	Kumar Sanu and Alka Yagnik	Dev Kohli
2.	"Banthan Ke"	Sukhwinder Singh and Sunidhi Chauhan	Madan Pal
3.	"Ishq Bhi Kya Cheez Hai"	Kumar Sanu, Sonu Nigam and Alka Yagnik	Sudhakar Sharma
4.	"Janam Tere Liye"	Kumar Sanu and Alka Yagnik	Sudhakar Sharma
5.	"Chal Shaadi Kar Lete"	Kumar Sanu and Alka Yagnik	Sudhakar Sharma
6.	"Yeh Tera Kurukshetra Hai"	Ravindra Sathe	Sudhakar Sharma
7.	"Ghagra"	Sunidhi Chauhan	Sudhakar Sharma

== Reception ==
Taran Adarsh wrote "On the whole, Kurukshetra is an engrossing good versus evil film that has all the masala to appeal to the masses ? winning performances, bravura dialogues and ample doses of action". Sharmila Taliculam of Rediff.com opined that "The violence is non-stop, unremitting, and at times, overdone to the point where you find yourself wishing it would end".
