= Shilpa Shetty filmography =

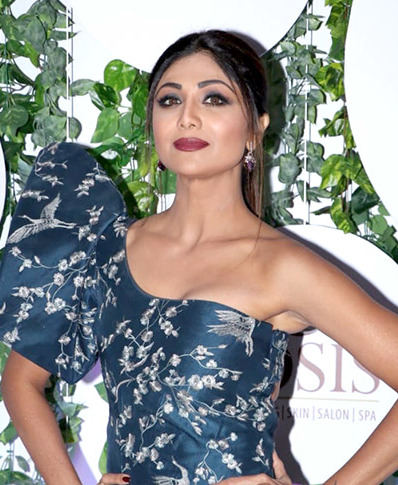
Shetty in 2018

Shilpa Shetty is an Indian actress who is primarily known for her work in Hindi films, in addition to a few Telugu, Kannada and Tamil films. Shetty made her acting debut opposite Shah Rukh Khan in the 1993 thriller Baazigar. Shetty's performance earned her two Filmfare Awards nominations for Lux New Face of the Year and Best Supporting Actress. She subsequently earned recognition with dual roles in the 1994 action-comedy Main Khiladi Tu Anari. After initial success, Shetty's films fared poorly at the box office for the next five years. Films Shetty starred in including action drama Aag, romantic drama Aao Pyaar Karen, comedy Haathkadi and Chhote Sarkar proved to be financially unsuccessful.

The 2000 romantic drama Dhadkan marked a turning point in her career, earning her several nominations in the Best Actress category at various award ceremonies. Shetty played the lead female in films such as family drama Apne, police drama Garv: Pride and Honour and musical drama Life in a... Metro. Her comic performance as an eccentric fisherwoman in 2002 action-drama release Rishtey earned her a nomination for the Filmfare Best Supporting Actress Award. Shetty became a global figure after winning the 2007 British reality television series Celebrity Big Brother, after comments made by other contestants about Shetty fell afoul of Ofcom rules and caused an international controversy over racism.

Shetty made her debut in South Indian cinema in the Tamil-language musical action film Mr. Romeo (1996). Shetty subsequently played lead roles in the Telugu films such as action drama Sahasa Veerudu Sagara Kanya (1996), comedy drama Veedevadandi Babu (1996) with Mohan Babu, and the action drama Azad (2000). She had a successful career in Kannada cinema with releases such as Preethsod Thappa, Ondagona Baa and Auto Shankar. Shetty has served as a talent judge for reality shows Zara Nachke Dikha, Nach Baliye, and Super Dancer.

== Films ==
Key
| † | Denotes films that have not yet been released |

List of Shilpa Shetty film credits
| Year | Title | Role(s) | Language | Notes | Ref. |
|---|---|---|---|---|---|
| 1993 | Baazigar | Seema Chopra | Hindi | Nominated—Filmfare Award for Lux New Face of the Year; Nominated—Filmfare Award for Best Supporting Actress | |
| 1994 | Aag | Bijli/Barkha Sharma | Hindi | | |
| 1994 | Main Khiladi Tu Anari | Mona/Basanti | Hindi | | |
| 1994 | Aao Pyaar Karen | Chhaya | Hindi | | |
| 1995 | The Gambler | Ritu/Radha | Hindi | | |
| 1995 | Hathkadi | Neha | Hindi | | |
| 1996 | Chhote Sarkar | Inspector Seema | Hindi | | |
| 1996 | Himmat | Nisha | Hindi | Special appearance | |
| 1996 | Mr. Romeo | Shilpa | Tamil | | |
| 1996 | Sahasa Veerudu Sagara Kanya | Bangaru | Telugu | Nominated—Filmfare Award for Best Actress – Telugu | |
| 1997 | Prithvi | Neha/Rashmi | Hindi | | |
| 1997 | Insaaf | Divya | Hindi | | |
| 1997 | Zameer: The Awakening of a Soul | Roma Khurana | Hindi | | |
| 1997 | Auzaar | Prathna Thakur | Hindi | | |
| 1997 | Veedevadandi Babu | Shilpa | Telugu | | |
| 1998 | Pardesi Babu | Chini Malhotra | Hindi | | |
| 1998 | Aakrosh | Komal | Hindi | | |
| 1998 | Preethsod Thappa | Chandana (Chandu) | Kannada | | |
| 1999 | Jaanwar | Mamta | Hindi | | |
| 1999 | Lal Baadshah | Parvati | Hindi | | |
| 1999 | Shool | Dancer | Hindi | Special appearance in song "UP Bihar Lootne" | |
| 2000 | Dhadkan | Anjali Chauhan Verma | Hindi | | |
| 2000 | Tarkieb | Lt. Captain Preeti Sharma | Hindi | | |
| 2000 | Jung | Tara | Hindi | | |
| 2000 | Azad | Kanaka Mahalakshmi | Telugu | | |
| 2000 | Kushi | Macarena | Tamil | Guest appearance | |
| 2001 | Indian | Anjali | Hindi | | |
| 2001 | Bhalevadivi Basu | Swetha | Telugu | | |
| 2002 | Karz | Sapna | Hindi | | |
| 2002 | Badhaai Ho Badhaai | Radha/Banto | Hindi | | |
| 2002 | Rishtey | Vyjayanthi | Hindi | Nominated—Filmfare Award for Best Supporting Actress | |
| 2002 | Chor Machaaye Shor | Kajal Singh | Hindi | | |
| 2002 | Hathyar | Gauri Shivalkar | Hindi | | |
| 2002 | Darna Mana Hai | Gayatri | Hindi | Story segment: Apples | |
| 2003 | Ondagona Baa | Belli | Kannada | | |
| 2004 | Garv: Pride & Honour | Jannat | Hindi | | |
| 2004 | Phir Milenge | Tamanna Sahani | | Nominated—Filmfare Award for Best Actress | |
| 2005 | Dus | Aditi | Hindi | | |
| 2005 | Fareb | Neha Malhotra | Hindi | | |
| 2005 | Khamoshh... Khauff Ki Raat | Sonia | Hindi | | |
| 2005 | Auto Shankar | Maya | Kannada | Nominated—Filmfare Award for Best Actress—Kannada | |
| 2006 | Shaadi Karke Phas Gaya Yaar | Ahana Kapoor | Hindi | | |
| 2007 | Life in a... Metro | Shikha | Hindi | | |
| 2007 | Apne | Simran Singh | Hindi | | |
| 2007 | Om Shanti Om | Herself | Hindi | Special appearance in song "Deewangi Deewangi" | |
| 2008 | Dostana | Herself | Hindi | Special appearance in song "Shut Up & Bounce" | |
| 2014 | Dishkiyaoon | Herself | Hindi | Special appearance in song "Tu Mere Type Ka Nahi Hai"; Also producer | |
| 2021 | Hungama 2 | Anjali | Hindi | | |
| 2022 | Nikamma | Avni | Hindi | | |
| 2023 | Sukhee | Sukhee | Hindi | | |
| 2026 | KD: The Devil | Satyavati | Kannada | | |

== Television ==
List of Shilpa Shetty television credits
| Year | Title | Role | Notes | Ref. |
|---|---|---|---|---|
| 2006 | Jhalak Dikhhla Jaa | Judge | season 1 | |
| 2007 | Celebrity Big Brother 5 | Contestant | Winner | |
| 2007 | Bigg Boss 2 | Host | | |
| 2010 | Zara Nachke Dikha | Judge | season 2 | |
| 2012–2014 | Nach Baliye | Judge | season 5–6 | |
| 2016–2021 | Super Dancer | Judge | | |
| 2018 | Hear Me Love Me | Judge | | |
| 2022 | India's Got Talent 9 | Judge | | |
| 2023 | India's Got Talent 10 | Judge | | |
| 2024 | Indian Police Force | Tara Shetty | | |
| 2026 – | Maa Hai Na | Host | | |

== Music videos ==
List of Shilpa Shetty music video credits
| Year | Title | Singer(s) | Label | Ref. |
|---|---|---|---|---|
| 2013 | "Betiyaan" (Save the Girl Child) | Shankar Mahadevan, Sunidhi Chauhan, Sonu Nigam | Worldwide Records | |
| 2015 | "Wedding Da Season Hai" | Neha Kakkar, Mika Singh | T-Series | |
