= List of awards and nominations received by Shilpa Shetty =

Shilpa Shetty awards and nominations
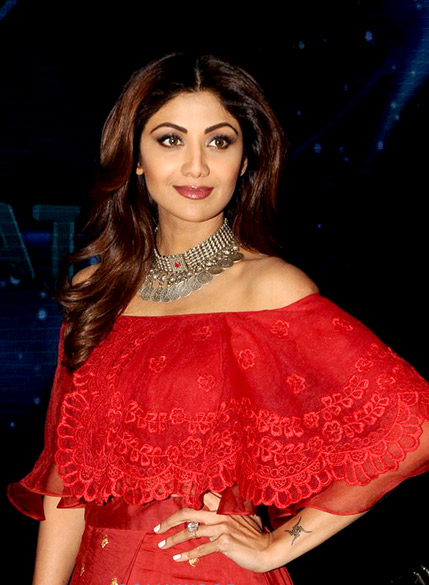
- Shetty in 2017
Awards and nominations
Award	Wins	Nominations
Apsara Film & Television Producers Guild Award	0	1
Bollywood Movie Awards	1	4
Filmfare Awards	0	4
IIFA Awards	1	3
Screen Awards	0	2
Zee Cine Awards	1	2
BIG Star Entertainment Awards	2	2
Indian Television Academy Awards	1	1
Indian Telly Awards	1	1

Totals (Note: Certain award groups do not simply award one winner. They acknowledge several different recipients, have runners-up, and have third place. Since this is a specific recognition and is different from losing an award, runner-up mentions are considered wins in this award tally. For simplification and to avoid errors, each award in this list has been presumed to have had a prior nomination.)
- Wins: 11
- Nominations: 30

Shilpa Shetty (born 8 June 1975) is an Indian actress and producer who works in Hindi films, in addition to few Telugu, Kannada and Tamil films. She made her acting debut in Baazigar, for which she received a nomination for the Filmfare Award for Lux New Face of the Year. As an actress, Shetty has won 11 awards out of 30 nominations, including one Bollywood Movie Award, one IIFA Award and one Zee Cine Award.

Shetty received several honors for her humanitarian causes including the IIFA Special Award for Global Impact. In 2007, she was awarded the Honorary Doctorate by the University of Leeds. In 2009, IIFA-FICCI Frames Awards awarded her with the "Most Powerful Entertainers of the Decade" with 9 other recipients.

== Film and television awards ==
=== BIG Star Entertainment Awards ===
The BIG Star Entertainment Awards was an annual award show presented by Reliance Broadcast Network Limited in association with STAR India to honour personalities from the field of entertainment. Shetty has won two awards.

Year	Category	Work	Result	Ref.
2013	Most Entertaining Jury (TV) - Non Fiction	Nach Baliye 6	Won	
2016	Most Entertaining Jury (TV) - Non Fiction	Super Dancer - Chapter 1	Won	

=== Bollywood Movie Awards ===
The Bollywood Movie Awards was an annual film award ceremony held in Long Island, New York, United States between 1999 and 2007 celebrating films and actors from the Bollywood film industry. Shetty won 1 award out of 4 nominations. She was the first-ever winner of the Bollywood Movie Award - Best Supporting Actress and received a nomination for the Bollywood Movie Award - Best Actress.

Year	Category	Work	Result	Ref.
1999	Best Supporting Actress	Pardesi Babu	Won	
2003	Best Supporting Actress	Rishtey	Nominated	
2003	Most Sensational Actress	Rishtey	Nominated	
2005	Best Actress	Phir Milenge	Nominated	

=== Filmfare Awards ===
The Filmfare Awards are presented annually by The Times Group to honor both artistic and technical excellence of professionals in the Hindi language film industry of India. Shetty received four nominations, one in the Lux New Face of the Year category, two in the Best Supporting Actress category and one in the Best Actress category.

Year	Category	Work	Result	Ref.
1994	Best Female Debut	Baazigar	Nominated	
1994	Best Supporting Actress	Baazigar	Nominated	
2003	Best Supporting Actress	Rishtey	Nominated	
2005	Best Actress	Phir Milenge	Nominated	

=== Filmfare Awards South ===
Filmfare Awards South is the South Indian segment of the annual Filmfare Awards, presented by the Filmfare magazine of The Times Group to honour both artistic and technical excellence of professionals in the Telugu cinema, Tamil cinema, Kannada cinema and Malayalam cinema.

Year	Category	Work	Result	Ref.
1996	Best Actress – Telugu	Sahasa Veerudu Sagara Kanya	Nominated	
2006	Best Actress – Kannada	Auto Shankar	Nominated	

=== IIFA Awards ===
The International Indian Film Academy Awards are presented annually by the International Indian Film Academy to honour both artistic and technical excellence of professionals in Bollywood, the Hindi language film industry. Shetty has been nominated twice for the Best Actress Award.

Year	Category	Work	Result	Ref.
2001	Best Actress	Dhadkan	Nominated	
2005	Best Actress	Phir Milenge	Nominated	
2007	IIFA Special Award for Global Impact	—N/a	Won	

=== Indian Television Academy Awards ===
The Indian Television Academy Awards, is an annual award ceremony organised by the Indian Television Academy to honour excellence in Hindi-language television.

Year	Category	Work	Result	Ref.
2008	The GR8!Achiever Laurel	Celebrity Big Brother 5 & Bigg Boss 2	Won	

=== Indian Telly Awards ===
The Indian Telly Awards is an annual award for excellence both on-screen and behind-the-scenes of Hindi-language television. Conceptualised and created by Anil Wanvari.

Year	Category	Work	Result	Ref.
2014	Best Judge Panel on a TV Show	Nach Baliye 6	Won	

=== People's Choice Awards India ===
The People's Choice Awards India was an annual awards ceremony presented to the Bollywood film industry. Shetty has received two nomination.

Year	Category	Work	Result	Ref.
2005	Favourite Movie Actress	Phir Milenge	Nominated	
2006	Favourite Movie Supporting Actress	Dus	Nominated	

=== Producers Guild Film Awards ===
The Producers Guild Film Awards are presented by the Apsara Producers Guild to honour and recognise the excellence of their peers to recognize excellence in film and television.

Year	Category	Work	Result	Ref.
2008	Best Actress in a Leading Role	Life in a... Metro	Nominated	

=== Sansui Viewer's Choice Awards ===
The Sansui Viewers' Choice Movie Awards was an annual awards ceremony presented to the Bollywood film industry. Shetty has received one nomination.

Year	Category	Work	Result	Ref.
2003	Best Comic Actor	Rishtey	Nominated	

=== Screen Awards ===
The Star Screen Awards is the only award ceremony in India to be involved with the Executive Director and the Governor of the Academy of Motion Picture Arts and Sciences. They are presented annually to honor professional excellence in the Hindi language film industry of India. Shetty has received two nominations, one in the Best Actress category and one in the Best Comedian category.

Year	Category	Work	Result	Ref.
2003	Best Comedian	Rishtey	Nominated	
2005	Best Actress	Phir Milenge	Nominated	

=== Zee Cine Awards ===
The Zee Cine Awards is an award ceremony for the Hindi film industry, now held abroad each year. Shetty has received a nomination in the Best Actor - Female category and won the Best Actor in a Supporting Role - Female award once.

Year	Category	Work	Result	Ref.
2005	Best Actor - Female	Phir Milenge	Nominated	
2008	Best Actor in a Supporting Role - Female	Life in a...Metro	Won	

== Other awards ==
Year	Award	Category	Work	Result	Ref.
2012	Jaipur International Film Festival	Best Actress	The Desire	Won	
2013	NDTV Indian of the Year	Fit and Wellness Icon	—N/a	Won	
2021	Lokmat Stylish Awards	Most Stylish Fashion Icon	—N/a	Won	
2022	Iconic Gold Awards	Fitness Icon of the Year	—N/a	Won	
2022	Pinkvilla Style Icons Awards	Super Stylish Showbiz Icon	—N/a	Nominated	

== Honours and recognitions ==
- 2005: Indian "Diva of the Year" by Sahara One Television viewers.
- 2007: Silver Star Award for her outstanding contribution to humanitarian causes.
- 2007: Rajiv Gandhi Award for her contribution to Indian cinema.
- 2007: Honorary Doctorate by University of Leeds
- 2009: Shetty was among the 10 recipients of the IIFA-FICCI Frames Awards for the "Most Powerful Entertainers of the Decade".
- 2019: Champions of Change Award for her work on the Swachh Bharat Mission cleanliness campaign.
