= Gitamohanam =

Gita Mohanam (गीतमोहनम्) 'Spiritual Hymns' is a book of spiritual poems in Sanskrit written by the Indian poet Manmohan Acharya and published in 2001. It consists of sixteen songs. Its songs have inspired compositions and choreographic works in Odissi classical dance.

== Overview ==
Two songs are written in traditional Sanskrit meters of Vasanta Tilaka and Pancha Chaamara. Two poems are in the style of Rabindra Sangeet. The Doha and Chaupai tradition of Tulsi Das is also found in two songs in Gitamohanam. Some songs are Classical Ragas. The 10th song Jagannatha vandanam (Prayer to the God of the Universe) is in both Sanskrit and Oriya.

== TV adaptation ==
The song Gajaraja chatwarimsika is featured in the 2010 movie The Desire. Classical music directors including Padmashree, Raghunath Panigrahi, Guru Ramahari Das, Devashish Sarkar, Laxmikant Palit, Sangeeta Gosain, Suchitra Mohapatra, Sukanta Kundu and Manjushree Tripathy have put songs from the Gitamohanam to music. Dancers including Guru Ratikant Mohapatra, Padmashree Gangadhar Pradhan Sujata Mohapatra, Rajashree Praharaj, Shilpa Shetty, Dona Ganguly and Rahul Acharya have performed to songs from the Gitamonaham.
