= Allan Amin =

Indian film director

Allan Amin is an action director in India's Bollywood, Tollywood and Mollywood film industries. He received the Filmfare Award for Best Action in 2001, 2004 and 2006 for Mission Kashmir (2000), Qayamat: City Under Threat (2003) and Dus (2005). He was also nominated by Flimfare Award for Best action in 2018 for the movie Jagga Jasoos (2017).

== Filmography ==
- Yaariyan 2 (2023) (Hindi)
- Kayamkulam Kochunni (2018) (Malayalam)
- Boss 2: Back to Rule (2017) (Bengali)
- Dishoom (2016)
- Romeo Ranjha (2014) (Punjabi)
- Power (2014) (Telugu)
- Rangbaaz (2013) (Bengali)
- Mumbai Police (2013) (Malayalam)
- Casanovva (2011) (Malayalam)
- Players (2012)
- Prince (2010)
- Blue (2009)
- Delhi-6 (2009)
- Singh Is Kinng (2008)
- Race (2008)
- Marudhamalai (2007) (Tamil)
- Madrasi (2006) (Tamil)
- Naksha (2006)
- The Namesake (2006) (English) & (Bengali)
- Dhoom 2 (2006)
- Rang De Basanti (2006)
- Happy (2006) (Telugu)
- Jai Chiranjeeva (2005) (Telugu)
- Chocolate (2005)
- Dus (2005)
- Sarkar (2005)
- Paheli (2005)
- Kaal (2005)
- Chehraa (2005)
- Blackmail (2005)
- Dhoom (2004)
- Fida (2004)
- Kyun...! Ho Gaya Na (2004)
- Main Hoon Na (2004)
- Rules: Pyaar Ka Superhit Formula (2003)
- Darna Mana Hai (2003)
- Qayamat: City Under Threat (2003)
- Bhoot (2003)
- Haasil (2003)
- The Hero: Love Story of a Spy (2003)
- Rishtey (2002)
- Road (2002)
- Shakti: The Power (2002)
- Agni Varsha (2002)
- The Legend of Bhagat Singh (2002)
- Na Tum Jaano Na Hum (2002)
- Moksha: Salvation (2001)
- The Warrior (2001)
- Aks (2001)
- Love Ke Liye Kuchh Bhi Karega (2001)
- Mission Kashmir (2000)
- Jungle (2000)
- Thakshak (1999)
- Hu Tu Tu (1999)
- 1947 Earth (1998)
- Satya (1998)
- Dil Se.. (1998)
- Stiff Upper Lips (1998)
- Bekhudi (1992)
- Yoddha (1992) (Malayalam)

== Other works ==
Allan Amin hosts a reality show on MTV, Pulsar MTV Stunt Mania. He is the stunt director and stunt coordinator of the show.
