= Manmohan Acharya =

Indian poet

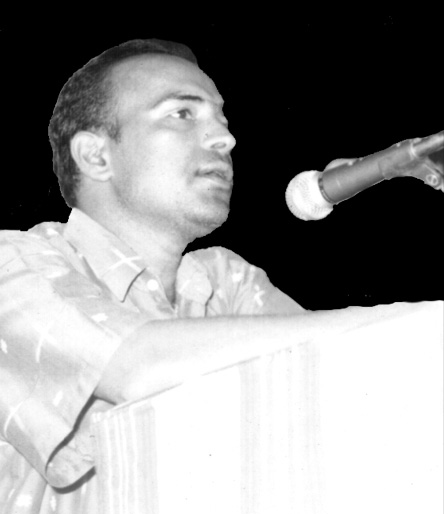
- Born: 20 October 1967; Lathanga, Odisha, India
- Died: 2013 (aged 45–46); Cuttack, Odisha, India
- Occupations: Poet, script writer for, Playwright, essayist
- Children: Ramashish Acharya
- Writing career
- Pen name: Vanikavi
- Period: 1987–2013
- Genre: Poetry
- Subjects: Post modernism, Realism,
- Notable works: Gita-Milindam, Gitamohanam

Manmohan Acharya was a poet and lyricist from India. His Sanskrit poems and lyrics have been put to music and danced to in the Odissi classical Indian dance form. A devotional song from his Gitamohanam was featured in the 2009 Bollywood movie, The Desire. He was also a researcher and published author.

== Early life ==
Manmohan Acharya was born in 1967 in Lathanga, a village in the Jagatsinghpur district of Orissa, India to Pandit Mayadhar Acharya and Parvati Devi.

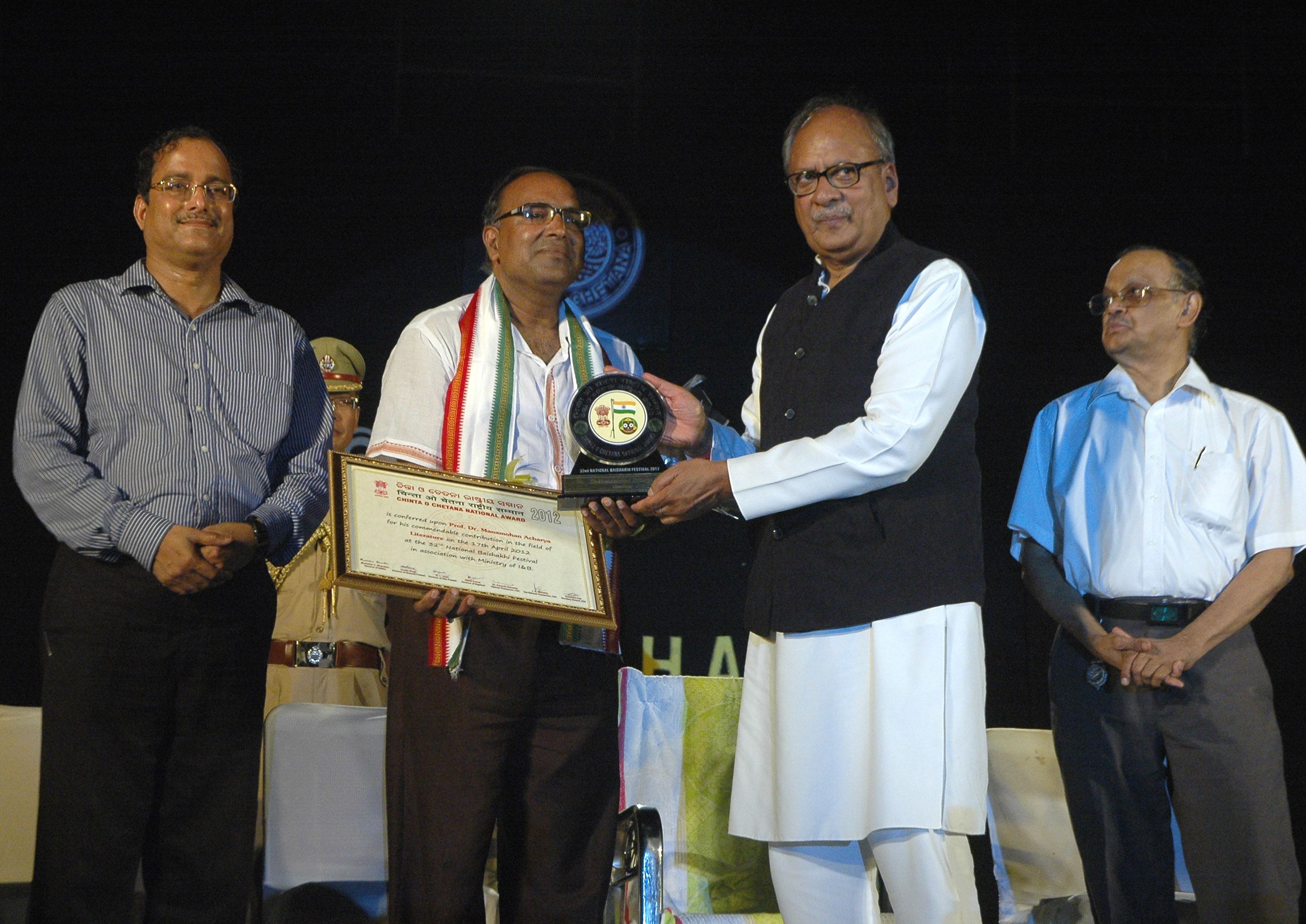
Acharya receives the Chinta O Chetana award for poetry

=== Poetry ===
His poetry includes the following works:

- Gitamohanam. One of its devotional songs features in the 2009 movie The Desire.
- Gita-bhaaratam (lyrics). A compilation of patriotic songs.
- Gita milindam (lyrics) consists of 15 songs (gunjans) with different rhythms.
- Palli-panchaasika (1987) - a Sanskrit minor poem (Khaṇḍakāvya)
- Subhasa-charitam - in Mahakavya style
- Sri Sivananda-Laharika - in Kāvya style
- Yati-giti-satakam (Sataka-kavya)

=== Dance drama ===
He has written dance dramas including:

- Arjuna-Pratijnaa
- Shrita-kamalam
- Pada-pallavam
- Divya-Jayadevam
- Ravana
- Pingalaa
- Mrtyu
- Sthitaprajnah
- Tantram
- Purva-sakuntalam
- Uttara-sakuntalam

Famous Indian Dance Drama, Mrtyuh by Srjan, Script written by Vanikavi

Famous Indian Dance Drama, Tantra by Srjan, Script written by Vanikavi

=== Translation ===
- Gitagovinda of Jayadev as Gitagovind Rasaavali

=== Research ===
With Famous Sanskrit Poet Prof. R.K.Sharma

1. Sistaachaara (Book)
2. Maagha And Bhanja in Picture Poetry (book)
3. Indian Trend of Human Rights
4. An Algebraic Operation in Vedic Mathematics;
5. Sharadindu-sundara-ruchih devi, Vani vaa Shakti-ruupini;
6. Sixty Four Arts, A Study;
7. Contribution of Sanskrit in Advancement of Oriya Language;
8. An Encyclopedic Dictionary Of Yajurvedic Upanishads (Book)
9. Vedic Research In Orissa during 20th Century
10. Mind in Shiva-samkalpa hymn, A psycho-philosophical Analysis
11. Bhaarata-pamkaja-dalamidam Utkal-mandala-miti viditam yat;
12. Description of Heart in Upanisads
13. Concept of Human Rights in Vedic Tradition;
14. Vedic Trend of Human Rights vrs. Varna- Ashrama System;
15. Financial Emergency : Kautilya's Arthashastra vis-a-vis Indian Constitution;
16. Kavivara- Bhaarata-varsham Shrauta-puraatanamaarsham;
17. Tarka Vaachaspati Madhusudan Mishra, A study
18. Map of Puranic India

== Awards ==
- Sanskrit Eloquency Award, Vikram University, Ujjain, M.P., 1990
- Vanikavi Award from Vanivinodi Parishad, Utkal University, 1991
- Doctor of Philosophy from Sri Jagannath Sanskrit University, 2003
- Gita-Saarasa Award from Christ College, Cuttack administration, 05.02.2005
- Delhi Sanskrit Academy Award for instant poem writing, 2007
- Ananda Bharadvaja Sammanah, 2007
- Lokakavyanidhi Award, from All India Lokabhasa Prachara Samiti, Puri, 2008
- Bharata-Bharati-Samman from National Sanskrit Sahitya Academy, 2009
- Abhinava Jayadeva Samman, 2009, Bhaktakavi Sri Jayadeva Samaroha samiti
- Sanskrit Sangeet Nataka Academy Award, 2010
- Fellowship of Vachaspati from Saraswati Research Institute
- Chinta Chetana National Baisakhi Award, 2012

== Death ==
Acharya died at his residence in Cuttack on 2013.
