= Parudeesa =

2012 Indian film

- Theatrical release poster
- Directed by: R. Sarath
- Written by: Vinu Abraham
- Produced by: Thampi Antony
- Starring: Sreenivasan; Thampy Antony; Swetha Menon
- Cinematography: Sajan Kalathil
- Edited by: B. Ajithkumar
- Music by: Ouseppachan (songs); Isaac Thomas Kottukapally (score)
- Production company: Kayal Films
- Distributed by: Remya Movies
- Release date: 26 October 2012
- Country: India
- Language: Malayalam

Parudeesa (transl. Paradise) is a 2012 Indian Malayalam-language drama film directed by R. Sarath and written by Vinu Abraham. The film stars Sreenivasan, Thampy Antony, and Swetha Menon. It explores the conflict between orthodox and unorthodox religious beliefs. Set in a remote hillside hamlet, the story revolves around a priest who adheres to tradition, and a verger, who holds a more liberated view of religion and life.

Parudeesa was the last film Jagathy Sreekumar completed before his accident. The film was released on 26 October 2012.

== Plot ==
It tells the story of a Catholic parish in a hillside village in Kerala. Set in two milieus – Kerala of the sixties and seventies and that of the eighties and nineties – the film unfolds through the conflict of ideals between Bishop Aanjalithanam, an orthodox Bishop, who is the last word in the parish, and a firebrand Priest named Jose, who believes that Christ was the original revolutionary. Both of them believe that their way to God is the true path, the only path.

As he sets out to bring a change in society, increasingly Father Jose finds himself facing opposition at every turn, and that's not only from Bishop Aanjalithanam but from within the parish and the extended village community too. The catalyst for the conflict is feisty Theresia, an umarried maid who works in the kitchen of a nearby convent. Jagathy Sreekumar also has an important role in the film, as the powerful secretary of the church committee.

== Cast ==
- Sreenivasan as Bishop Aanjalithanam
- Thampy Antony as Father Jose
- Swetha Menon as Theresia
- Jagathy Sreekumar as Antochan
- Nandu as Mammachan, the rubber tapper
- Indrans
- Ambika Mohan as Authachan's wife
- Krishna Prasad

== Production ==
Parudeesa was produced by Thampy Antony under the banner of Kayal Films. It was mainly shot in Erumapra near Erattupetta and Vinu Abraham says it was more like a miracle to find the exact locale he visualised for the film. "We wanted a church that stands high on a mountainous terrain and got this ancient church that was established more than a century back by the missionaries. It was the first time a movie camera entered its premises," he says. The film's background score is by Issac Thomas Kottukapally while the songs are composed by Ouseppachan. Thampi Antony who is acting in as well as producing the film pens a song in the film. The song starting with the lines, "Yathra Chodikkunnu", is sung by Vijay Yesudas.

== Release ==
The film was released on 26 October 2012.

=== Critical reception ===
The critic of Sify.com rated the film "Below Average" and wrote, "There is a decent storyline here but the problem is the way it has been narrated. . The usual cliches of the offbeat films are there and the efforts to commercialise the presentation have ended up as a rather half-baked one." The reviewer also criticised Thampi Antony's performance stating that the actor is "evidently struggling to fit in to the role".

The film became controversial for inciting the clergymen in the film. In reply to the controversies created, Sarath said: "It's a baseless allegation that the film instigates an anti-religious propaganda. In fact Parudeesa is a film that glorifies Christ. It makes a jibe at the situation where religion supersedes everything else, even god. From the progressive ideologies of 60s and 70s we are going back to the perils of theocracy. The film attacks superstitions and regression from a pointblank position." Vinu Abraham Vinu Abraham says in a sense Parudeesa attempts to define faith. "We are trying to tell that despite all its external rigidity, religion, at its core, should be a progressive forum," says Vinu.
