= Dus Bahane =

Song performed by KK and Shaan

- Dus Bahane song cover

Song by KK and Shaan

from the album Dus
- Language: Hindi
- Released: 2005
- Recorded: 2004
- Length: 3:26
- Label: T-Series
- Composer: Vishal–Shekhar
- Lyricist: Panchhi Jalonvi

Music video
- "Dus Bahane" on YouTube

"Dus Bahane" (transl. Ten excuses) is a song from the 2005 Hindi film Dus, sung by KK and Shaan. The lyrics for the song were written by Panchhi Jalonvi and the music is composed by Vishal–Shekhar.

"Dus Bahane" received positive reception from audiences and critics and became a chartbuster.

== Music video ==
The video shows Shashank Dheer (Abhishek Bachchan) and Aditya Singh (Zayed Khan) dancing to the song.

=== Filming ===
Zayed Khan revealed to Bollywood Hungama that the song wasn't supposed to be shot, but the director Anubhav Sinha insisted Bachchan and Khan. Khan said, "if we manage to shoot it, fine, if not, we will release the movie as is". The song was shot in 10 hours.

== Critical reception ==
The song was well-received by the public and critics. According to Rediff.com, "what people loved more than the script was the song of it. Viewers complained about the song coming on too early in the film." Joginder Tuteja of Bollywood Hungama described the song as a "marvelous number" and said "if there has been a song this year that has caught the nation's attention on day one of the promos, it's the title song "Dus Bahane"". Sukanya Verma of Rediff.com also liked the song and described the song as "punchy and high-voltage."

== Accolades ==
"Dus Bahane" won the award at the 3rd ceremony of India's MTV Immies—Best Performance in a film song (Male) for Bachchan and Khan. The song received nomination at the 51st ceremony of India's Filmfare Awards—Best Male Playback Singer for Shaan and KK. It was also nominated at the 7th ceremony of India's IIFA Awards—Best Male Playback Singer for Shaan and KK.

== 2.0 version ==
"Dus Bahane 2.0"
- Official song cover

Song by Vishal–Shekhar featuring KK, Shaan and Tulsi Kumar

from the album Baaghi 3
- Language: Hindi
- Released: 12 February 2020
- Recorded: 2019
- Studio: T-Series
- Genre: Bollywood; filmi
- Length: 3:21
- Label: T-Series
- Composer: Vishal–Shekhar
- Lyricist: Panchhi Jalonvi
- Producer: Meghdeep Bose

Music video
- "Dus Bahane 2.0" on YouTube

"Dus Bahane 2.0" (transl. Ten Excuses 2.0) is a Hindi song from the 2020 film Baaghi 3. The song was recorded, mixed and mastered by Eric Pillai - Future Sound Of Bombay in Mumbai. The song is arranged and programmed by Meghdeep Bose.

The makers of Baaghi 3 released its first song "Dus Bahane 2.0" on Wednesday. The track is a rehash of the title track "Dus Bahane" of 2005 film Dus. The music video featured Tiger Shroff and Shraddha Kapoor.

The official song was released on the T-Series's YouTube channel on 12 February 2020. The song was also made available for Online streaming on Saavn, iTunes and Gaana on the same day.
