= R. Sarath =

Indian film director and screenwriter (1960/1961–2026)

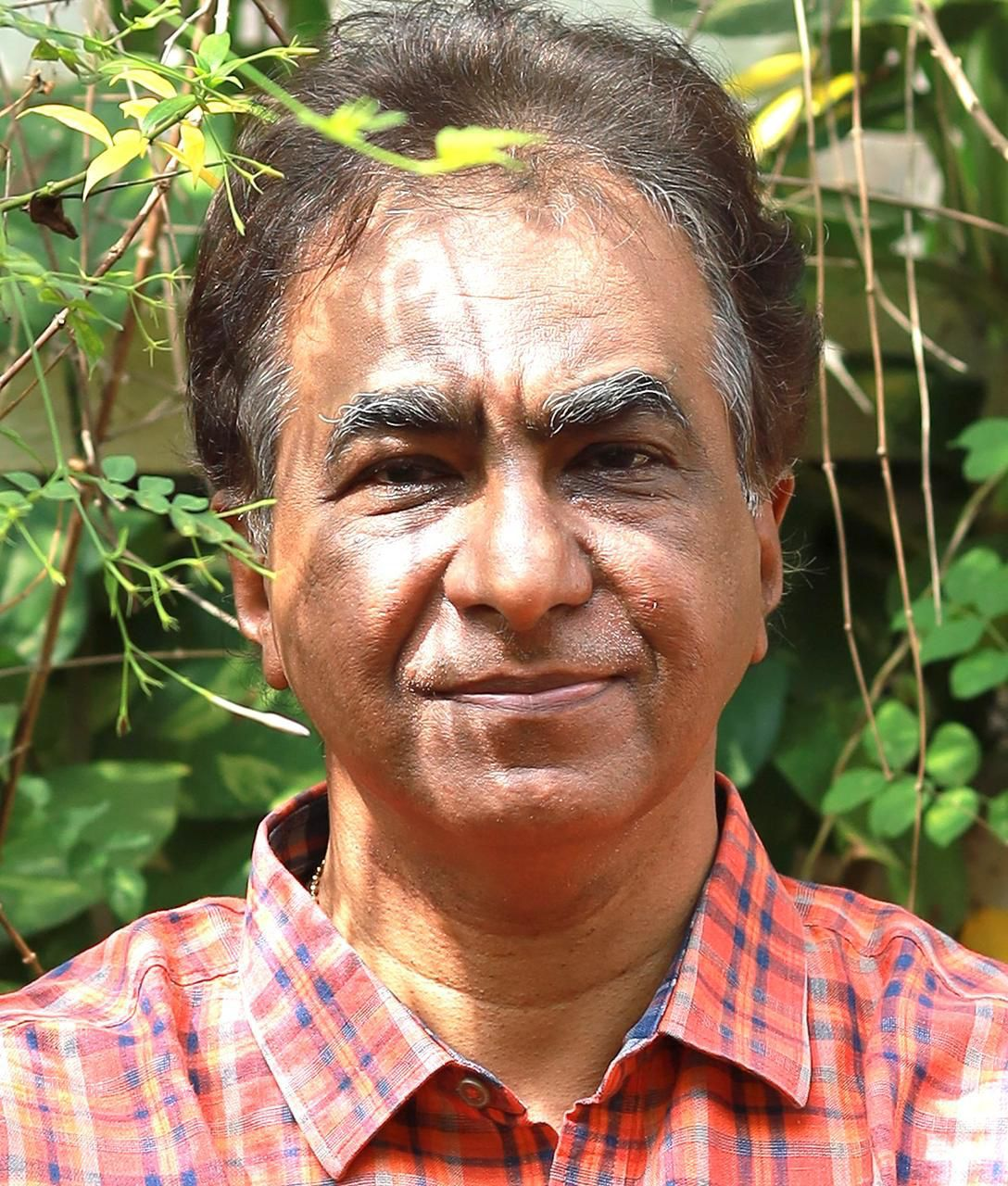
- R. Sarath
- Born: 1960 or 1961; Vilakkudy, Kollam, Kerala, India
- Died: 7 September 2026 (aged 65); Thiruvananthapuram, Kerala, India
- Occupation: Film director
- Years active: 2000–20??
- Website: http://www.sarathfilmdirector.com/

R. Sarath (1960 or 1961 – 7 September 2026) was an Indian film director and screenwriter who worked primarily in the Malayalam film industry based in Kerala.

== Career ==
R. Sarath started his film career as a documentary film director. During the filming of his documentary The Painted Epics, he discovered some rare mural paintings of Raja Ravi Varma, which were not exposed to the public yet. These findings have been a landmark in the history of Ravi Varma paintings and was a turning point in his career as an innovative documentary maker as he won many international awards for the same. He also received junior fellowship from Department of Culture, Government of India in 1996 for his research on Murals.

Gaining experience as a documentary and short film maker, he turned into the feature filmmaking. He debuted with the critically acclaimed drama Sayahnam (Twilight) in 2000. The film centred on the environmental and anti-nuclear issue in India, won seven Kerala State Film Awards and a National Film Award. Acclaimed as a remarkable film, Sayahnam got invitations from many international film festivals.

Bhumikku Oru Charamagitam (A Requiem to Earth), a short film on eco-feministic aesthetics based on the renowned Malayalam poem by legendary poet O. N. V. Kurup was greatly appreciated for its docu-fictional style and has been screened before elite audience, both at home and abroad.

His next feature film venture Sthithi (Plight) told the tale of a couple employed in the Secretariat. The film received rave reviews and was screened at many international film festivals. The major highlight was that the movie featured playback singer Unni Menon in the lead. His third feature film Seelabathi—another drama set in rural Kerala that revolves around the experiences of two young people who come from outside the village—received positive remarks from critics. Sarath said that the film is for "all those girls who have been reported missing from several parts of the State."

Purani Dun is his Hindi short film. He also directed a Hindi feature film Indo-Chinese co-production titled The Desire: A Journey of a Woman (2011) that premiered at various international film festivals and fetched numerous honours. It tells the journey of an Indian classical dancer and the love story between her and a Chinese artist, whom she meets during a travel assignment.

In his next Malayalam language feature, Sarath inter-weaved yet another complex theme—that of conflict of belief, the perpetual disagreement between orthodox and unorthodox paths of religion. The film titled Parudeesa (Paradise) earned rave reviews but became controversial even though it is a positive portrayal of Christianity .

== Personal life and death ==
R. Sarath, a post graduate in English Literature and Journalism, was retired as Deputy of Visual Communication at Information and Public Relations Department, Government of Kerala. He had earlier served as the Director to MPCC (Vyloppilli Samskrithi Bhavan) and secretary to Bharat Bhavan, Department of Culture, Government of Kerala. He was also the festival director of IUKFF 2007 at London.

Sarath died from kidney disease on 7 September 2026, at the age of 65.

== Filmography ==
=== Feature films ===
| Year | Original title | Notes |
|---|---|---|
| 2000 | Sayahnam | |
| 2002 | Sthithi | |
| 2005 | Seelabathi | |
| 2011 | The Desire: A Journey of a Woman | |
| 2012 | Parudeesa | |
| 2014 | Buddhanum Chaplinum Chirikkunnu | |
| 2017 | Swayam | |
| 2020 | Mahatma Gandhi Road | |
| 2024 | Burial of Dreams | |

== Awards ==
- Indira Gandhi Award for Best First Film of a Director – Sayahnam
- National Film Award for Best Feature Film in Malayalam – Sayahnam
- Kerala State Film Award for Best Film – Sayahnam
- Kerala State Film Award for Second Best Film – Sthithi
- Kerala State Film Award for Best Short Film – Bhoomikku oru charamageetham
- Kerala State Film Award for Best Story – Sayahnam
- Award for Best Narrative Feature Film at the 2011 Geneva International Film Festival – The Desire
