= Chhote Sarkar (1996 film) =

1996 Indian film by Vimal Kumar

- Promotional Poster
- Directed by: Vimal Kumar
- Written by: Naeem-Ejaz (dialogues)
- Story by: Saroj Khan
- Produced by: Vimal Kumar
- Starring: Govinda; Shilpa Shetty
- Cinematography: Anil Dhanda
- Edited by: Prakash Dave
- Music by: Anand–Milind
- Production company: Shivam Chitrya
- Release date: 22 November 1996
- Country: India
- Language: Hindi
- Budget: ₹4 crore
- Box office: ₹6.89 crore

Chhote Sarkar (translation: Little Prince) is a 1996 Indian Hindi-language romantic thriller film directed by Vimal Kumar and written by S. Khan and Naeem-Ejaz The film starred Govinda and Shilpa Shetty. It is inspired from Sanjeev Kumar thriller suspense film Anhonee The film was a moderate box office success.

== Plot ==
Amar Saxena is a businessman, and the managing director of prestigious Khaitan Fans Ltd., India. One day while leaving from a board meeting, he meets a beggar named Jagmohan, who calls him Rohit, and asks him to return home to his ailing wife, Seema. Amar denies being Rohit, but feels sorry for him and gives him some money, which Jagmohan declines to accept. Curious at his refusal, Amar offers to help. He visits the hospital and gets to meet Seema, and ends up falling in love with her. What he does not know that Jagmohan and Seema are plainclothes police officers, who have been assigned to arrest him for the murder of Ram Kumar Saxena, Amar's uncle. Using his wits, Amar manages to convince the Court that he is of unsound mind, and thus escapes being imprisoned, and ends up in an asylum. From here Amar must stock of his life, and figure out who has framed him for a murder he did not commit, and why Seema and Jagmohan were so intent to incriminate him.

== Cast ==
- Govinda as Amar Saxena / Rohit (Chhote Sarkar)
- Shilpa Shetty as Inspector Seema Bedi
- Divya Dutta as Meena (Lobo's sister)
- Aruna Irani as Amar's aunt
- Sadashiv Amrapurkar as Dr. Khanna (Amar's family doctor)
- Kader Khan as Jagmohan / ACP Chandra Bedi
- Aasif Sheikh as Photographer Lobo
- Tej Sapru as Beera (Dr. Khanna's Henchman)
- Avtar Gill as Ram Kumar Saxena (Bade Sarkar)
- Dinesh Hingoo as Cop
- Guddi Maruti as Doctor
- Mehmood Jr. as Asylum inmate (as Jr. Mehmood)
- Gurbachan Singh as Goon at Swimming Pool

== Songs ==
All lyrics are written by Rani Malik; all music is composed by Anand–Milind.

No.	Title	Singer(s)	Length
1.	"Ek Chumma Tu Mujhko"	Udit Narayan, Alka Yagnik	5:14
2.	"Socho Na Zara Yeh"	Udit Narayan, Alka Yagnik	5:11
3.	"Ladki Patale"	Vinod Rathod, Alka Yagnik	4:56
4.	"Main Aaya Hoon"	Bali Brahmabhatt	5:58
5.	"Mujhe Dil Ka Rog"	Alka Yagnik	4:14
6.	"Ek Naya Aasman"	Kumar Sanu, Alka Yagnik	5:48

== Controversy ==
In 1997, a petition was filed in Pakur district against Govinda and Shilpa Shetty, alleging that the song "Ek Chumma Tu Mujhko Udhar Dede" from the film was "vulgar, obscene, and defamatory to Bihar and UP". In 2019, the High Court granted relief to Govinda and Shetty. In its decision, the court states that the general rule would not apply to the actor because the film was cleared by the Central Board of Film Certification under the Cinematography Act of 1952.
