= Hear Me Love Me (TV series) =

TV series produced by Amazon

- Genre: Reality-TV
- Starring: Shilpa Shetty
- Music by: Yash Narvekar
- Country of origin: India
- Original language: Hindi
- No. of seasons: 1
- No. of episodes: 10

Production
- Executive producers: Aradhana Bhola; Keshav Kaul
- Running time: 36-38 minutes
- Production company: Fremantle

Original release
- Network: Amazon Video
- Release: 28 September 2018

Hear Me. Love Me. is an Amazon Prime Video series. It premiered on Amazon Video on 28 September 2018. Hosted by actress Shilpa Shetty, where she plays the Cupid and mentors to these young participants.

== Plot ==
The show follows a girl going on 3 dates with 3 men. The girl spends time with the men but is unable to see them as they have a camera strapped around the chest. The show has women aged 21–30 who go on virtual dates to find their suitor. At the end of the day, the girl has to pick the person she likes on the basis of their personality and then the 3 men's faces are revealed. The chosen person and the girl then have a choice of going ahead with a date. Shilpa Shetty will be seen helping the girl navigate her emotions while tapping into her personal anecdotes and experience.
