= Aakrosh (1998 film) =

1998 film by Lateef Binny

- Poster
- Directed by: Lateef Binny
- Written by: Sanjay Kumar
- Produced by: Ramesh J. Sharma
- Starring: Sunil Shetty; Shilpa Shetty
- Cinematography: Sanjay Malvankar
- Edited by: Kuldip Mehan
- Music by: Anand Raj Anand
- Release date: 3 April 1998
- Running time: 155 mins
- Country: India
- Language: Hindi

Aakrosh (English: Anger) is a 1998 Indian Hindi action crime thriller film directed by Lateef Binny starring Sunil Shetty and Shilpa Shetty in the lead roles.

== Plot ==
Due to his illegal activities, Anjali Gujral separates from Mahendra Pratap Gujral, and marries Dr. Malhotra. She does bring up her son, Dev, from her first marriage, who grows up to become a police officer. Years later, on the tracks of Gujral, Dev, and his close colleague, Komal, come across Suraj Singh, and find out that he is indeed Gujral. At this point, Gujral decides to play on Dev's emotions by reminding him of his past affection for him, and blaming his entire criminal career on a politician, Rajvansh Shashtri. Dev must now decide whether to go after Shastri, or disbelieve his father altogether.

== Cast ==
- Sunil Shetty as CBI Officer Dev Malhotra
- Shilpa Shetty as Komal
- Kulbhushan Kharbanda as CBI Chief Vikram Dutt
- Johnny Lever as CBI Officer Gopi / Himself (Double Role)
- Navin Nischol as Dr. Malhotra
- Anjana Mumtaz as Anjali Malhotra
- Girish Karnad as Rajvansh Shastri
- Suresh Oberoi as Mahendra Pratap Gujral / Suraj Singh
- Mohan Joshi as Chauhan / Thakur
- Ranjeet as Cyras
- Shiva Rindani as Girdhari

== Soundtrack ==
Song	Singer
"Madhosh Ho Gaya Main"	Asha Bhosle, Abhijeet
"Hello Hello Bolke"	Abhijeet, Kavita Krishnamurthy
"Picnic Mein Ho Gaya"	Udit Narayan, Aditya Narayan, Kavita Krishnamurthy
"Tadke Tadke"	Udit Narayan, Abhijeet
"Ujla Ujla"	Hema Sardesai
"Yeh Ladki Hai"	Udit Narayan, Kavita Krishnamurthy
