= Gita milindam =

Sanskrit epic

Gita-milindam,(गीतमिलिंदम्, Song of the Bumblebee) is a famous epic in Sanskrit written by Indian Poet, Manmohan Acharya.

== Theme ==
Gita milindam contains 15 gunjans (songs) in different melodious rhythms. The poet swept over untouched horizons and speaks for the common mass. The couple of bumble-bees are the natural singers and enjoyers of life's honey. By taking them as anchors of his presentation of poetic message, the poet has not only shown a creative technique but also suggested his attitude to life. Looking at his off-beat theme, none can deny that he is projecting the voice of the mass and hence he is a postmodern poet. The author of Gita-milindam does not present the theme of courtly love. Instead, while subverting the Jayadeva tradition he has composed a parody that ridicules lyrical romantic love in its lyrical structure, typically popular in the Sanskrit literary tradition.

The male and female bumblebees are the hero and heroine of the poem. They present their dialogues in different cantos. The male bee is a passionate lover of sensual enjoyment whereas the female bee opposes it. The male is the hero of the Omar Khayam who wishes to live away his life in sensuality. Parallels are drawn between him and a Tennysonian "lotus eater" - heedless to the closure of the lotus flower at sunset and even its resultant death. The female partner warns him, reminding him of the contemporary social and economic crises such as child labour, unemployment and political corruption that shatter society as a whole, resulting in severe and pitiable conditions that compel an old woman like archetypical Kunti to moving from door to door. Doctors are taking the lives of living human beings while the god of death takes away only the lives of the dead. We are reminded of the September 11 attacks that devastated New York City. Environmental pollution, children's death due to starvation and many other social problems seek to draw the attention of the bee-poets to presenting their experience rather than the ethereal and unnaturally high pitch of Romanticism of bygone days. The female bee is not a materialist, but certainly a representative of the Marxist socialism objecting to the feudalistic luxury and courtly ideology so typical of the age-old Sanskrit literature.

Poet Manomohan has been successful in lyricizing the theme that has for so long been considered anti-lyrical. The reader wonders at how Acharya has overcome the challenging task of reorienting the Sanskrit language to accommodate the contemporary theme in such traditional meters. While using nine ragas from Jayadeva,(cantos 1-5, 8-10 and 13), he has used Raga from other sources, the six ragas, Abhinava being his own invention.

== Quotations ==
'O! Poet Bumblebee, don’t repeat such poetry on ornamented face of a lady dazzling through fish like eyes and glorified by long black hairs. Here, the foetus of girl child, swimming fearlessly in mother’s womb is killed by her own father. Sita ... ... ., an innocent girl is made like a commodity in the horrible dowry market.' 'O! Partner Bumblebee, realize the pain. Please think deeply on it. Remember that the pen which steals both hunger and attention, is really a pen, nectar-flowing.'

== Translations ==
Gitamilindam was translated into English by Bernad Ambrose. Dr. R.N.Mohapatra, Former Professor and Head of the P.G. Department of Hindi, Ravenshaw University translated the poetry into Hindi.

== Editions ==
Gita milindam was first published in 1999 by the publication division of S.S. College, Jagatsinghpur, Orissa with the bare Sanskrit text in Devanagari Script. The Second Edition was published by K. Mohapatra, Advocate, Orissa High Court, Cuttack in 2008 with Hindi translation by Prof. R.N. Mohapatra. The 3rd edition was published as an English translation, Song of the Bumblebee, by Bernad Ambrose and Ramashish Acharya on Scribd on July 12, 2010.
