= Aao Pyaar Karen =

1994 film

- Poster
- Directed by: Ravendra Peepat
- Written by: Ravendra Peepat
- Based on: Chembaruthi by R. K. Selvamani
- Produced by: Gautam Bokadia
- Starring: Saif Ali Khan; Shilpa Shetty; Somy Ali
- Music by: Aadesh Shrivastav
- Release date: 25 November 1994 (India)
- Running time: 141 minutes
- Country: India
- Language: Hindi
- Budget: ₹ 1 crore
- Box office: ₹ 1.43 crore

Aao Pyaar Karen (transl. Come, Let’s fall in love!) is a 1994 Indian Hindi-language romantic drama film directed by Ravindra Peepat, starring Saif Ali Khan, Somy Ali and Shilpa Shetty. It is a remake of the 1992 Tamil film Chembaruthi.

== Plot ==
Anjali Devi (Bharati) is a rich businesswoman who lives by herself in a palatial mansion. She is attended by a number of people, including Sampat Rai (Prem Chopra), her business manager, and Chhaya (Shilpa Shetty), a girl from the local village. Chhaya was raised by Anjali Devi, and the two are very fond of each other. One day, Anjali Devi receives a telegram intimating that her grandson Raja (Saif Ali Khan) is coming to visit her from London.

It is revealed that Anjali Devi's only son married against her husband's wishes and was subsequently thrown out of the house. At his deathbed, her husband made Anjali Devi promise that she wouldn't let their son or his family cross the threshold of their house. Anjali Devi's son and daughter-in-law later pass away in an accident, but bound by the promise to her dying husband, Anjali Devi repudiates Raja when he comes to see her.

Chhaya advises Raja to set up a tent outside the house and slowly win over his grandmother. The plan succeeds, and eventually Anjali Devi accepts him. Raja and Chhaya fall in love and decide to get married. In the meantime, Sampat Rai, who had hoped to inherit her business, is furious at Raja's arrival in Anjali Devi's life. He decides to set up his daughter Sonu (Somy Ali) with Raja. Sonu and Raja become good friends. Anjali Devi also agrees to their marriage. However, Raja refuses to marry Sonu and tells Anjali Devi that he loves Chhaya.

Anjali Devi is furious at the thought of her grandson marrying down into a poor family and has Sampat Rai throw Chhaya out. Chhaya's brother Shankar (Mukesh Khanna) takes her back home. He, too, is furious that she fell in love with Raja and vows to get her married to the ultra creepy Maniram (Gulshan Grover). He locks up Chhaya to stop her from meeting Raja. When Raja tries to find Chhaya, he is beaten up by Maniram. Eventually, Chhaya and Raja run away with the aid of Shankar's wife. Maniram, Shankar, and Sampat Rai find out and pursue the couple. Before they catch up with the runaways, the latter get married in a temple. Shankar and Anjali Devi decide to forgive them.

However, Maniram, with the help of Sampat Rai, kidnaps Chhaya and Raja and takes them to Sampat Rai's abandoned factory. Sampat Rai, in the meantime, also kidnaps Anjali Devi and takes her there. He tortures her into signing over her property to Sampat Rai. Shankar finds his way to the factory and helps Chhaya and Raja fight Maniram and Sampat Rai. Sonu too has followed her father to the factory. She tries to free Anjali Devi but is killed in the process. Sampat Rai breaks down when he realizes that he has accidentally killed his own daughter. Just then, the police arrive and arrest the goons. At end Anjali Devi, Raja, and Chhaya are reunited.

== Cast ==
- Saif Ali Khan as Raja
- Shilpa Shetty as Chhaya
- Somy Ali as Sonu S. Rai
- Aparajita as Sampat's wife
- Gajendra Chauhan as Suraj
- Rakesh Bedi as Pandit Kashiram
- Bharati as Anjali
- Prem Chopra as Sampat Rai
- Gulshan Grover as Maniram
- Mukesh Khanna as Shankar
- Rajesh Puri as Bakshish
- Himani Shivpuri as Razia Shankar's wife
- Subbiraj as Anjali's husband
- Tiku Talsania as Tikuram

== Soundtrack ==
The music was composed by Aadesh Shrivastava and released by BMB Music Company. All lyrics were written by Shyam Raj.

Aao Pyaar Karen

Soundtrack album by Aadesh Shrivastava
- Released: 1994
- Recorded: 1994
- Genre: Soundtrack
- Length: 36:27
- Label: BMB Music Company
- Producer: Aadesh Shrivastava

Aadesh Shrivastava chronology
Imtihaan (1994)	Aao Pyaar Karen (1994)	Sauda (1995)

Track list
No.	Title	Singer(s)	Length
1.	"Chand Se Parda Kijiye"	Kumar Sanu	6:21
2.	"Haathon Mein Aa Gaya Jo Kal"	Kumar Sanu	5:38
3.	"Jab Do Dil Milte Hain"	Kumar Sanu, Sadhana Sargam	6:41
4.	"Kyun Phool Khilte Hain"	Kumar Sanu, Vijayeta Pandit	5:50
5.	"Oee Maa Yeh Kya Ho Gaya"	Poornima, Kumar Sanu	5:27
6.	"Zinda Hain Jo Log Mohabbat"	Suresh Wadkar	6:30
7.	"Chand Se Parda Kijiye II"	Sonu Nigam	6:21
Total length:			36:27
