= Haathkadi (1995 film) =

Hathkadi
- Promotional Poster
- Directed by: Tatineni Rama Rao
- Story by: Karaikudi Narayanan
- Produced by: A. V. Subbarao
- Starring: Govinda; Shilpa Shetty; Shakti Kapoor
- Cinematography: Prasadbabu
- Edited by: Gowtham Raju
- Music by: Anu Malik
- Production company: Prasad Art Productions
- Release date: 31 March 1995
- Country: India
- Language: Hindi
- Budget: ₹3 crore
- Box office: ₹8,29 crore ( India Nett)

Hathkadi (transl. Handcuffs) is a 1995 Hindi-language action comedy film directed by T. Rama Rao starring Govinda, Shilpa Shetty and Shakti Kapoor. The film was an average grosser in Big Cities in North India but a big hit in small cities and villages in North India. Lekar Tujhko Jaaonga Dulhan song was very popular and also responsible for its box office success in small centres in North India.

== Plot ==
Assistant Commissioner of Police, Suraj Chauhan, is an honest and diligent police officer. These qualities in him are instilled in him due to the presence of corrupt politicians and police officers like the Home Minister Bhavani Shankar, Suraj's Deputy Inspector General. Suraj has a brother, who is a crime reporter for the Indian Times. Home Minister Bhavani Shankar goes to a function held by an adoption center for orphan girls. There, he encounters a pretty girl and instantly feels infatuated with her. He asks the DIG to ask the Mayor's wife to bring her to him, since the Mayor's wife is the owner of the adoption center. At first, the Mayor's wife resists and says no, but when the DIG threatens to tell the truth about her past endeavours in dealing with prostitutes to her husband, she agrees. That night, when the Mayor's wife brings the girl to Bhavani Shankar, little does he know that Arun is on an assignment for his newspaper. Arun discovers and records a video of Bhavani Shankar raping the same girl from the adoption center. The next night, Arun goes to see the Mayor, only to show him the misdeed that Home Minister Bhavani Shankar has committed. Filled with anger and disgust, the Mayor and Arun head to the police department to have Home Minister Bhavani Shankar arrested for this. But unfortunately, the Mayor's wife overhears them and informs the DIG about this. On the way to the police station, Arun and the Mayor are blocked and then ruthlessly killed by Chakku Pande (Puneet Issar), a special hired goon of Bhavani Shankar. Suraj is enraged and aggrieved at the loss of his brother and swears to avenge his death. As Suraj finally starts coming more in contact with Bhavani Shankar, he realises his bad character and that Bhavani Shankar is the one behind his brother's killing. After that, Suraj goes to Chakku Pande to get him to confess to the killing he did, according to the order given by Bhavani Shankar. But Chakku Pande denies it and thus is beaten up by Suraj. Chakku Pande gets sent to jail by Suraj until he decides to confess to his crime. Then one night, Bhavani Shankar hires a few goons to have Chakku Pande killed. But Chakku Pande survives due to Suraj and the police and claims he will protest against Bhavani Shankar. To Suraj's surprise, when he takes Chakku Pande to a huge public function to confess this truth, Chakku Pande puts the blame on Suraj. After that, the lights go out, and a gunshot is heard. When the lights come back on, Chakku Pande is dead, and a possible suspect is seen running away through the crowd by Suraj. Presuming that Suraj is the killer (which he is not), the evil police officers of Bhavani Shankar arrest Suraj and send him to jail for the murder of Chakku Pande. But when he reaches jail, he is surprised to see that he has a lookalike, Rajnikant. Rajnikant is a simple man with strong positive morals who came to jail because he killed a man who tried to rape his wife. And when Rajnikant realises that the evil politicians put Suraj in jail in the first place, he suggests that Suraj and Rajnikant can switch places so that Suraj can leave as Rajnikant, since Rajnikant's sentence is almost over. And from here starts a fun and action-filled story of how Suraj and Rajnikant join forces to finally accomplish Suraj's goal of avenging his brother.

== Cast ==
- Govinda as dual role
  - ACP Suraj Chauhan
  - Rajnikant Chauhan
- Madhoo as Rani
- Shilpa Shetty as Neha
- Arun Govil as Arun Chauhan
- Shakti Kapoor as Bhavani Shankar
- Kiran Kumar as DIG Vijaykumar
- Tej Sapru as Inspector Prabhakar
- Alok Nath as Chief Minister
- Satyen Kappu as Chandraprakash
- Puneet Issar as Chakku Pandey, the killer
- Vijayalalitha as Lata
- Laxmikant Berde as Pyarelal
- Jayalalitha as Sub-inspector Phoolan Devi
- Vishwajeet Pradhan as Baccha Thakur
- Ishrat Ali as Guruji of Bhavani Shankar

== Music ==
Lyrics are by Maya Govind and one song each by Dev Kohli and Anu Malik himself.

1. "Aanan Faanan Aanan Faanan" – Swarnalatha, Abhijeet, Anu Malik
2. "Jawani Me Aag Lagi" – Chithra K S, Anu Malik
3. "Mera Chandi Jaisa Tan" – Swarnalatha, Anu Malik
4. "Amma Amma" – Abhijeet, Swarnalatha
5. "Janta Hu Manta Hu" – S P Balasubramaniam, Chithra K S
6. "Lml Baba Lml" – Alisha Chinai, Anu Malik
