= Lathanga, Odisha =

Lathanga Rathaanga
- Village
- Location in Odisha, India
- Coordinates: 20°16′17″N 86°26′9″E
- Country: India
- State: Odisha
- District: Jagatsinghpur

Languages
  - Official: Odia
- Time zone: UTC+5:30 (IST)
- PIN: 754140
- Telephone code: 06722
- Vehicle registration: OD-
- Nearest city: Paradip
- Literacy: 76%
- Lok Sabha constituency: Jagatsinghpur

Lathanga is a village in the state of Odisha, India.

== Location ==
Lathanga is near to Paradip and 10 kilometers distant from the Bay of Bengal.

== Demographics ==
According to the 2001 census, the population of the village is 384, 186 males and 198 females. 155 makes and 137 females are literate.
