= Veedevadandi Babu =

- Directed by: E. V. V. Satyanarayana
- Written by: E. V. V. Satyanarayana
- Story by: Sundar C
- Based on: Ullathai Allitha (Tamil)
- Produced by: Anna Rao
- Starring: Mohan Babu; Shilpa Shetty; Tanikella Bharani
- Cinematography: Chota K. Naidu
- Music by: Sirpy
- Release date: 18 April 1997
- Country: India
- Language: Telugu

Veedevadandi Babu is a 1997 Indian Telugu-language comedy film written and directed by E. V. V. Satyanarayana. The film is an official remake of the Tamil film Ullathai Allitha which itself was heavily inspired by the Hindi film Andaz Apna Apna. The film stars Mohan Babu, Shilpa Shetty and Tanikella Bharani.

== Cast ==
- Mohan Babu as Sriram
- Shilpa Shetty as Shilpa
- Tanikella Bharani as Ongole
- Brahmanandam
- Chalapathi Rao
- Kolla Ashok Kumar
- Kota Srinivasa Rao
- Srihari
- A. V. S. Subramanyam
- Ruchi
- Ironleg Sastri

== Soundtrack ==
Veedevadandi Babu

Soundtrack album by Sirpy
- Released: 1997
- Genre: Soundtrack
- Length: 28:08
- Language: Telugu
- Label: T-Series
- Producer: Sirpy

Music was composed by Sirpy and released by T-Series. Except "Chamak Chamak", five of the songs from this film were reused from Ullathai Allitha (1996), which itself plagiarised from various sources; "Aoura Laila" is based on "Ahla Ma Feki" by Hisham Abbas, "I Love You" is based on another Abbas song "Wana Amel Eih", "O Chelee Chelee" is based on "In the Summertime" by Mungo Jerry, "Chitti Chitti Guvvapilla"" is based on the Pakistani folk song "Laung Gawacha" and "Rama Hay Rama" is based on "Kinna Sohna Tainu" by Nusrat Fateh Ali Khan.

All lyrics are written by Sirivennela Seetharama Sastry.

No.	Title	Singer(s)	Length
1.	"Rama Hay Rama"	Mano, Geetha	5:20
2.	"Chamak Chamak"	Mano, Sujatha Mohan	5:04
3.	"Chitti Chitti Guvvapilla"	Mano, Sujatha Mohan	4:04
4.	"I Love You Love You"	Mano	4:29
5.	"O Chelee Chelee"	Mano	4:33
6.	"Aoura Laila"	Mano	4:38
Total length:			28:08

== Reception ==
Writing for The Times of India in 2019, a critic wrote that "Veedevadandi Babu is one of the funniest films of all time in Tollywood history".
