= Dus =

2005 Indian film by Anubhav Sinha

- Theatrical release poster
- Directed by: Anubhav Sinha
- Written by: Story and Screenplay: Yash-Vinay; Dialogues: Anubhav Sinha
- Produced by: Nitin Manmohan
- Starring: Sanjay Dutt; Sunil Shetty; Abhishek Bachchan; Zayed Khan
- Narrated by: Sanjay Dutt
- Cinematography: Vijay Kumar Arora
- Edited by: Rohan Desai
- Music by: Songs: Vishal–Shekhar; Background Score: Ranjit Barot
- Distributed by: Karma Entertainment; Zee Motion Pictures
- Release date: 8 July 2005
- Running time: 147 minutes
- Country: India
- Language: Hindi
- Box office: ₹38.83 crore

Dus (transl. Ten) is a 2005 Indian Hindi-language action spy thriller film directed by Anubhav Sinha, based on the lives of seven fictional SIT (Indian Special Investigation) officers. It stars Sanjay Dutt, Sunil Shetty, Abhishek Bachchan, Zayed Khan, Shilpa Shetty, Raima Sen, Esha Deol, and Dia Mirza. It was a critical and commercial success.

Dus is a tribute to the Indian film director Mukul S. Anand, who had died while filming the incomplete 1997 film of the same title, which starred Dutt, Shilpa Shetty, and Raveena Tandon with Salman Khan.

== Plot ==
Across the opening narration, Siddhant Dheer (Sanjay Dutt), head of the ATCl (a fictional organisation based on the real-life Anti-Terrorism Squad and the Central Bureau of Investigation), reflects on how rampant terrorism has become in the world and goes on to tell the story of 7 of the hardest days in his life.

The ATC gets a tip off about an impending terrorist attack planned for May 10, targeting 20 thousand people. The man behind the plan is Jamwaal, a hardened criminal who is feared by political figures and the law alike. Siddhant starts an unofficial investigation against Jamwaal. A goon named Altaf is arrested in connection with the case after the ATC defuses a bomb threat at a building.

Later, a woman is shot dead at her own home by an unknown assailant. Siddhant gets a tip from Neha (Esha Deol) an undercover officer stationed in Canada, that an aide of Jamwaal named Himmat Mehendi has been arrested by the Canadian police. After attending the engagement of their sister Anu (Diya Mirza) Siddhant asks his brother Shashank Dheer (Abhishek Bachchan) and his energetic partner Aditya Singh (Zayed Khan) to head to Canada. They are instructed to apprehend Himmat, transport him to a safe location and extract information from him about the plan. At the same time, Anu and her fiancé are kidnapped with a demand for Altaf's release. That is when Siddhant realises that there is a terrorist informer within the ATC.

Meanwhile, in Canada, Aditya and Shashank realise that the car they are travelling in has a bomb attached. They drive faster as reducing the speed would detonate the bomb. Dan, a local police officer (Sunil Shetty) who is meeting his estranged wife Priya (Raima Sen) to convince her to return to him after an incident that killed their unborn baby, sees them driving over the speed limit and pursues them in a high speed car chase. Aditya and Shashank escape by jumping off the car as it explodes while traversing a bridge. They are met by Neha, who reveals that she had planted the bomb in their car and asked them to drive it as some sort of a test.

The two go to her house and manage to kidnap Himmat, who claims that he is JD. Dan encounters them again and follows them to another bridge, where he pulls them over roughly and interrogates them, all the while refusing to believe their real identity. However, when a hit squad appears on the bridge and attacks them and a bullet hits Dan on the shoulder, it is Aditya and Shashank who save his life. Later, in custody, Himmat breaks down and tells them that everybody working for Jamwaal is a pawn. At this point the skeptical Dan decides to team up with Aditya and Shashank, and the trio move to his house.

When Himmat claims that he does not know anything else, the trio realizes that Himmat believes Jamwaal will save him, and will not reveal any sensitive information. When they stage an attempt on Himmat's life, a scared Himmat tells them that the only people who pose real danger to Jamwaal are Asif (the guy who sent the hit squad earlier) and Irfan, his friends turned foes, who have betrayed him to foil the plan for May 10. This leads the trio to a disco, Asif's hideout, where they question him. Asif gives them Irfan's whereabouts but commits suicide. The trio captures Irfan but mistakenly believing him to be Jamwaal, kills him and Himmat is set free.

In India, Siddhant discovers that Roy is the ATC mole and saves Anu by laying a trap for her captors but Anu's fiancé dies in a blast. Roy is detained but commits suicide instead of suffering the indignity of going to prison, after revealing that the codeword for the May 10 operation is JEET. Siddhant decides to go to Canada, while Aditi (Shilpa Shetty), his love-interest, decides to use Altaf as a bait to track down those in league with Jamwaal. As a result, many high-profile individuals and politicians are exposed.

Back in Canada, Shashank decides to propose to Neha and goes to her house along with Dan and Aditya but her is house suspiciously dark and empty. When they hear footsteps and confront the intruder they are shocked. Siddhant, who is the intruder, tells them that the real Neha was murdered some time back and has been replaced by a fake Neha, who had planted the bomb in their car (based on information given by Roy). The day Altaf was arrested, Jamwaal had suffered an accident. The real Neha, who had been following them, knew the real Himmat Mehendi, had been killed by Irfan. It was his body which had been found in Priya's car when she was about to divorce Dan. Jamwaal had wanted to kill his former friends but Altaf, his hired goon, was arrested by ATC. When he was kidnapped by the trio and they assumed he was Himmat Mehendi, he had he had used the misunderstanding and conned the trio to kill his friends turned foes, which is what he had wanted Altaf to do meaning his coast is now clear. This leads to one shocking reality: the person that they had released assuming him to be Himmat Mehendi, is the real Jamwaal.

Still clueless about Jamwaal's plan, the quartet focuses on JEET. Siddhant figures that every letter in the word has something to do with its position in the English alphabet. J is 10, the date of the attack; E is 5, denoting the month of May; the second E denotes the time, 5 O' clock, and T is 20, the significance of which remains unknown. The quartet receives information that a football match will take place at a nearby stadium on that date, and the Prime Minister of India has been invited as the Chief Guest, to be felicitated by 20 thousand people.

Realizing that the stadium will be bombed at 5 O'clock, the quartet turns up at the stadium on the fateful day. Siddhant is captured by the stadium guards, who are also in on the plan. Aditya finds the bomb on a car whose registration number ends with the number 20 and the timer is set for 20 minutes (explaining the T in JEET). He drives the car outside the stadium while Shashank finds another bomb of the same size and takes it to a nearby flying club, where he runs into the fake Neha, who confesses that she has fallen in love with him. The two load the bomb into a small plane and Shashank decides to dispose of it in a deserted area.

Dan enters the stadium via another route, only to end up being taken hostage, along with his estranged wife and the school children she is escorting. Dan somehow rescues them, while Siddhant escapes and kill some of the goons despite being temporarily blinded. Both head in different directions to find Jamwaal. Jamwaal is informed by his men that both the bombs were taken away and that the attack has been averted. Jamwaal tries to escape from the building, only to run into Siddhant. Jamwaal almost succeeds in escaping by pretending to be someone else, but Siddhant calls him on the bluff.

Shashank realizes that he has too little time to dispose of the second bomb safely, and decides to crash the plane. He bids an emotional farewell to his teammates on radio and crash lands in a lake. Aditya is running out of time and does not know where to dispose of the bomb. Siddhant is distraught by the turn of events. Dan calls for help, and succeeds in rescuing Aditya just moments before the jeep explodes in a valley. Jamwaal tries to escape, but is tracked down and shot dead by Siddhant in an elevator. The film ends with Shashank's ashes immersed in the river and Siddhant lamenting about the loss of his brother's life.

== Cast ==
- Sanjay Dutt as Siddhant Dheer, Head of ATC, Shashank and Anu's elder brother.
- Suniel Shetty as Danish Walia (Dan), Canadian police officer, Priya's husband.
- Abhishek Bachchan as Shashank Dheer, member of ATC, Siddhant's younger and Anu's elder brother.
- Zayed Khan as Aditya Singh, member of ATC, Shashank's best friend.
- Shilpa Shetty as Aditi, member of ATC, Siddhant's love-interest.
- Raima Sen as Priya Walia, Dan's wife.
- Esha Deol as fake ATC agent Neha, Shashank's love-interest.
- Dia Mirza as Anu Dheer, Aditya's love-interest, Siddhant and Shashank's younger sister.
- Pankaj Kapur as Jamwal, the terrorist.
- Gulshan Grover as Irfan, Jamwal's friend and decoy turned rival
- Rajendra Sethi as Altaf, Jamwal's friend turned rival
- Ninad Kamat as Agent Roy, member of ATC and terrorist informer
- Delhi Ganesh as Suryakant Raidu
- Anjan Srivastav as Bose
- Mayte Garcia as singer/dancer in "Deedar De" song
- Meesha Singh as dancer/model in "Dus Bahane Kar Ke Le Gaye Dil" song

== Production ==
Dus is a tribute to celebrated director Mukul S. Anand, who had died while filming the 1997 incomplete film of the same name, and which had also starred Sanjay Dutt alongside Salman Khan. The film had a plot involving terrorism in Kashmir, along with Sylvester Stallone-style action scenes. The film had a then unprecedented budget of ₹200 million. However, the 1997 film was cancelled after Anand's death. The 2005 film, according to director Anubhav Sinha, is a different film, with a different plot; the sole common thread between the two films is Dutt as lead and producer Nitin Manmohan.

== Reception ==
=== Critical response ===
Taran Adarsh of IndiaFM gave the film two out of five, writing, "On the whole, DUS has an impressive star cast, the hit tracks ['Dus Bahane' and 'Deedar De'] and vibrant action as its trump card. But, on the flip side, the film doesn't have the content to keep you hooked to the proceedings for the next two hours." Raja Sen of Rediff.com wrote, "This is full-on time-pass, sure. A racy actioner free of common sense, full of frilly thrills. And, as Mumbai parlance has it, 'total paisa vasool'."

=== Box office ===
According to Box Office India, it had an excellent opening. In its entire theatrical run at the box office, it grossed around ₹388.4 million. It was the tenth highest-grossing film of the year 2005.

== Soundtrack ==
Dus

Soundtrack album by Vishal–Shekhar
- Released: 30 May 2005
- Genre: Feature film soundtrack
- Length: 1:03:28
- Language: Hindi
- Label: T-Series
- Producer: Vishal-Shekhar

Vishal–Shekhar chronology
| Bluffmaster! (2005) | Dus (2005) | Salaam Namaste (2005) |

The music is composed by Vishal–Shekhar. Lyrics are penned by Panchhi Jalonvi and Mehboob. According to the Indian trade website Box Office India, with around 17,00,000 units sold, this film's soundtrack album was the year's sixth highest-selling. The song "Dus Bahane" was reportedly the most played song in 2005. The song "Dus Bahane" was recreated as "Dus Bahane 2.0" for Baaghi 3 (2020) by Vishal–Shekhar, marking the first time the duo recreated their own song. The song "Deedar De" was later recreated for Chhalaang (2020).

=== Track listing ===
| No. | Title | Lyrics | Singer(s) | Length |
|---|---|---|---|---|
| 1. | "Dus Bahane" | Panchhi Jalonvi | KK, Shaan | 3:26 |
| 2. | "Deedar De (Nikhil Mix)" | Panchhi Jalonvi | Sunidhi Chauhan, Krishna Beura | 4:56 |
| 3. | "Chham Se" | Panchhi Jalonvi | Sonu Nigam, Shaan, Babul Supriyo, Sunidhi Chauhan, Sapna Mukherjee | 5:17 |
| 4. | "Unse Pooche" | Panchhi Jalonvi | Udit Narayan, Alka Yagnik | 4:50 |
| 5. | "Samne Aate Ho" | Panchhi Jalonvi | Sonu Nigam, Sunidhi Chauhan | 4:49 |
| 6. | "Jaaniya Ve" | Panchhi Jalonvi | Hariharan, Mahalakshmi Iyer | 6:06 |
| 7. | "Dus Bahane – Extended" | Panchhi Jalonvi | KK, Shaan | 4:39 |
| 8. | "Adrenaline Nitrate – Dus Theme" | | | 5:45 |
| 9. | "Zalzala" | Mehboob | Sukhwinder Singh | 4:31 |
| 10. | "Make Some Noise" | Panchhi Jalonvi | Ranjit Barot | 3:25 |
| 11. | "Alternate Trance" | Panchhi Jalonvi | Cara | 2:22 |
| 12. | "Deedar De (Ranjit Barot Mix)" | Panchhi Jalonvi | Sunidhi Chauhan, Krishna Beura | 5:05 |
| 13. | "Get into My Car" | Panchhi Jalonvi | Caralisa Monteiro, Earl Edgar | 3:53 |

== Awards and nominations ==
| Award | Category | Nominee | Results |
|---|---|---|---|
| International Indian Film Academy Awards | Best Action | Allan Amin | Won |
| International Indian Film Academy Awards | Best Special Effects | Prime Focus | Won |
| International Indian Film Academy Awards | Best Villain | Pankaj Kapur | Nominated |
| International Indian Film Academy Awards | Best Music Director | Vishal–Shekhar (also for Bluffmaster!) | Nominated |
| International Indian Film Academy Awards | Best Male Playback Singer | KK and Shaan for "Dus Bahane" | Nominated |
| International Indian Film Academy Awards | Best Female Playback Singer | Sunidhi Chauhan for "Deedar De" | Nominated |
| Filmfare Awards | Best Action | Allan Amin | Won |
| Filmfare Awards | Best Villain | Pankaj Kapur | Nominated |
| Filmfare Awards | Best Music Director | Vishal–Shekhar | Nominated |
| Filmfare Awards | Best Male Playback Singer | KK and Shaan for "Dus Bahane" | Nominated |
| Filmfare Awards | Best Female Playback Singer | Sunidhi Chauhan for "Deedar De" | Nominated |
