= The Desire (2010 film) =

Indo-Chinese film about love and art

The Desire: A Journey of a Woman
- Theatrical release poster
- Directed by: R. Sarath
- Written by: R. Sarath; Dialogue: Amitabh Varma
- Produced by: Sunanda Shetty
- Starring: Shilpa Shetty; Xia Yu; Jaya Prada; Anupam Kher; Sheetal Menon; Nakul Vaid; Sachin Khedekar
- Cinematography: Sajjan Kalathil
- Edited by: Beena Paul
- Music by: Songs: Shankar–Ehsaan–Loy; Guest Composition: Priyanka Pripri; Background Score: Vishwa Mohan Bhatt
- Distributed by: C-9 Motion Pictures; Indish Creations
- Release dates: 2010 (film festivals); 2012
- Running time: 96 minutes
- Country: India
- Languages: English; Hindi; Cantonese

The Desire: A Journey of a Woman is a 2010 India-Chinese feature film, directed by R. Sarath. Starring Shilpa Shetty in the lead role, the film also stars Chinese actor Xia Yu along with Indian actors and actresses Jaya Prada, Anupam Kher, Sheetal Menon and Sachin Khedekar. The film began shooting in January 2009 and was expected for a public release in mid-2009 but was not released due to production problems, including the original producer leaving midway through shooting, only to be replaced by Shetty's mother, Sunanda. It was subsequently screened at film festivals worldwide and set for release in India and China in August 2012, but was still listed as forthcoming as late as September 2012. The movie was shot in Kerala, Ahmedabad, Nasik, Mumbai, Hyderabad and Malaysia.

The Desire is a film about "dance, music, art, culture and emotions". It tells the journey of an Indian classical dancer, Goutami, and the love story between her and a Chinese artist, Jai Leang, whom she meets during a travel assignment.

== Cast ==
- Shilpa Shetty as Goutami
- Xia Yu as Jai Leang
- Jaya Prada as Goutami's mother
- Anupam Kher
- Sheetal Menon
- Nakul Vaid
- Vikram Gokhale
- Aasif Sheikh
- Sachin Khedekar
- Vinayak Vinod as Musui
- Priyanka Pripri as Priyanka Pripri

== Music ==
A. R. Rahman was approached to compose the music for the film but he declined, citing a busy schedule. The soundtrack was then scored by the acclaimed composer trio Shankar–Ehsaan–Loy, whilst the background score was composed by Vishwa Mohan Bhatt. To give an Odissi touch to the film, a devotional song of Lord Jagannath, an integral part of the dance form, was included during the dance. The film has two classical songs, a Sanskrit sloka by eminent Poet Pdt. Manmohan Acharya and an Odia song taken from Padyaballi, written by Gopalkrushna Patnaik. Two more tracks were added by international new age singer-songwriter and composer Priyanka Pripri from Sydney, Australia to add a fusion of Indian and Chinese music.

== Honours ==
- Best Narrative Feature Film at the 2011 Geneva International Film Festival
