= Sahasa Veerudu Sagara Kanya =

1996 film by K. Raghavendra Rao

- Theatrical release poster
- Directed by: K. Raghavendra Rao
- Written by: Paruchuri Brothers
- Produced by: Burugapalli Sivarama Krishna
- Starring: Venkatesh; Shilpa Shetty; Malashree
- Cinematography: A. Vincent; Ajayan Vincent
- Edited by: K. A. Marthand; Marthand K. Venkatesh
- Music by: M. M. Keeravani
- Production company: Sri Venkateswara Art Films
- Release date: 9 February 1996
- Running time: 139 minutes
- Country: India
- Language: Telugu

Sahasa Veerudu Sagara Kanya (transl. Adventurous Hero and the Mermaid) is a 1996 Indian Telugu language film directed by K. Raghavendra Rao. It stars Venkatesh, Shilpa Shetty and Malashree, with music composed by M. M. Keeravani. The film was dubbed in Tamil as Kanavu Kanni and in Hindi as Sagar Kanya.

== Synopsis ==
The film is about Ravi Chandra, the film's hero, and Sagara Kanya, a mermaid. Malashree plays Ganga, Ravi's cross-cousin, who loves him. They stay with some comedians in a house near the seashore. Bangaru Raju, the villain of the film, tries to acquire a ship which sank with much treasure on board.

He associates himself with a witch who helps him find the treasure. After a few attempts, the witch finds out that the treasure can be recovered with the help of a mermaid. Accidentally, one day, Sagara comes onto land from the water and loses her mermaid body. She transforms into a beautiful woman. Whenever water is spilled over her, however, she turns back into a mermaid.

On land, she becomes involved with the hero, Venkatesh. She is named Bangaram. Bangaram starts loving Ravi. The witch learns about Sagara and informs Bangaru Raju that only a mermaid can find the treasure.

The film continues with Bangaram being harassed and with Ravi's adventures. In the end, Ravi wins over the evil elements. Bangaram returns to the sea, uniting Ravi and his cousin.

== Cast ==
- Venkatesh as Ravi Chandra
- Shilpa Shetty as Bangaram
- Malashree as Ganga
- Kaikala Satyanarayana as Bangaru Raju
- Kota Srinivasa Rao as Mutyalu
- Srihari as Ratnalu
- Brahmanandam
- Babu Mohan as Nallodu
- Sudhakar as Lingaraju
- Ali
- Dharmavarapu Subramanyam as Police Inspector
- Rallapalli
- Ananth
- Gundu Hanumantha Rao as Gundu
- Suthivelu
- Visweswara Rao as Pottivadu
- Mada
- Jagga Rao
- Vijayalalitha as Malakpeta Manchala

== Soundtrack ==
Sahasa Veerudu Sagara Kanya

Soundtrack album by M. M. Keeravani
- Released: 1996
- Genre: Soundtrack
- Length: 30:00
- Label: Melody Makers
- Producer: M. M. Keeravani

M. M. Keeravani chronology
Pelli Sandadi (1996)	Sahasa Veerudu Sagara Kanya (1996)	Is Raat Ki Subah Nahin (1996)

Music was composed by M. M. Keeravani and was released on Melody Makers audio label.

Telugu version

No.	Title	Lyrics	Singer(s)	Length
1.	"Abbabbo Abbabbo"	Bhuvanachandra	S. P. Balasubrahmanyam, Chitra	5:03
2.	"Ghadiya Ghadiyakomuddu"	Bhuvanachandra	S. P. Balasubrahmanyam, Chitra	5:10
3.	"Meena Meena"	Veturi	S. P. Balasubrahmanyam, M. M. Srilekha	5:10
4.	"Srinadhuni Kavithaloni"	Jonnavithhula Ramalingeswara Rao	S. P. Balasubrahmanyam, Chitra	4:56
5.	"Appananga Chikkenamma"	Vennelakanti	S. P. Balasubrahmanyam, Sindhu	4:52
6.	"Pettamandhi Pettamandhi"	Vennelakanti	Mano, Chitra	5:19
Total length:				30:00

Tamil version (Kanavu Kanni)

All the lyrics are written by Vairamuthu.

No.	Title	Lyrics	Singer(s)	Length
1.	"Manjal Niraj Konda"	Vairamuthu	S. P. Balasubrahmanyam, Chitra	4:57
2.	"Kaniya Kaniya"	Vairamuthu	S. P. Balasubrahmanyam, Chitra	4:59
3.	"Kandai Meen"	Vairamuthu	S. P. Balasubrahmanyam, Chitra	4:55
4.	"Meenu Meenu Nee"	Vairamuthu	S. P. Balasubrahmanyam, Chitra	4:54
5.	"Eru Kangalal Kavithai"	Vairamuthu	S. P. Balasubrahmanyam, Chitra	4:50
6.	"Malligai Thoranangal"	Vairamuthu	S. P. Balasubrahmanyam, Chitra	5:11
Total length:				29:57

== See also ==
- Splash
- Laal Paree
