= Auto Shankar (film) =

2005 film by D. Rajendra Babu

- Directed by: D. Rajendra Babu
- Written by: B. L. Venu Tushar Ranganath (Dialogues)
- Screenplay by: Ajay Kumar
- Story by: Ajay Kumar
- Produced by: Ramu
- Starring: Upendra; Shilpa Shetty; Radhika
- Cinematography: H. C. Venu
- Edited by: T. Shashikumar
- Music by: Gurukiran
- Production company: Ramu Films
- Release date: 9 September 2005 (India)
- Running time: 170 minutes
- Country: India
- Language: Kannada

Auto Shankar is a 2005 Indian Kannada-language masala film starring Upendra, Shilpa Shetty, and Radhika. The film was directed by D. Rajendra Babu and produced by Ramu, of Ramu Enterprises. It tells the story of Shankar, an autorickshaw driver belonging to a middle-class family, who gets into a conflict with Maya, a moneylender. However, the tables turn when she loses her property and they fall in love.

The film was dubbed in Tamil as Aanavakari, in Hindi as Shilpa - The Big Don in 2007 and in Malayalam as Sarappa Sundari. The film was remade in Bangladesh in 2017 as Ohongkar.

== Synopsis ==
Shankar is a middle-class autorickshaw driver based on chennai. He is friendly and jovial. Maya, a moneylender, is brought up in a rich family and is portrayed as a boorish character. She is unscrupulous in recovering loans given to the poor and has designed crude methods to recover the money. She is also the daughter of a lady don.

Shankar defends the poor and fights the moneylenders. Several interesting battles follow, after which the Maya loses all her property and prestige. It is also revealed that she is not really the daughter of the lady don. She then learns a lesson that reforms her attitude. She makes amends, and Shankar embraces her as the two fall in love. The rest forms the plot of the story.

== Cast ==
- Upendra as Auto Shankar
- Radhika Kumaraswamy as Gowri
- Shilpa Shetty as Maya, an arrogant moneylender
- Sudharani as Geeta, Shankar's sister
- Bhavya as an Auto driver's wife
- Srinivasa Murthy as Shankar's father
- Sumithra as Shankar's mother
- Gurukiran as Akash, Geeta's husband
- Avinash as Ramayya, Maya's biological father
- Tara as Maya's biological mother
- Srinivas Prabhu
- Ramesh Bhat as a victim whose daughter committed suicide due to Maya
- Ashok Rao as DGP of Police
- Lakshman Rao as Corrupt Police Inspector
- Doddanna as Kalamma's husband
- Rangayana Raghu as Maava, Kalamma's accountant
- Telangana Shakuntala as Kalamma, a don and Maya's adopted mother
- Ashalatha
- Mohan Raj as Peddodu, Kalamma's brother
- Rajashekhar Kotian as Chinnodu, Kalamma's brother
- Mohan Juneja as a man who came to see Geeta for a marriage proposal
- Maarimutthu Sarojamma
- Shanthamma
- H. M. T. Nandha
- Padma Vasanthi
- Sadhu Kokila as Anandha, Gowri's maternal uncle
- B. Jayamma
- Bangalore Nagesh as Kalamma's husband's accountant
- Dileep
- M. N. Suresh
- Pailwaan Venu

== Production ==
The film was launched at Gavi Gangadeshwara Temple in Basavanagudi in Bangalore. As the director was ill during the majority of the shoot, Telugu cinema's renowned associate director Shiva Ramakrishna, an associate of Puri Jagannadh, directed the songs, fight sequences and a major portion of Shilpa Shetty's scenes. The movie was filmed in different locations including Austria, Finland, the Bangalore Palace, and the Mysore Lamps Factory, Mysore.

=== Controversy ===
The film sparked off a controversy with regard to a movie poster depicted a glamour still of Shilpa Shetty from the film. A Madurai based lawyer filed an obscenity case against Shetty. Shetty however, protested by saying that "It (the photo) is not vulgar. I am an actor and an entertainer and I won't endorse vulgarity".

== Soundtrack ==
The music is composed by Gurukiran.

The music of the song "Ready Ready" was used in the Telugu film Nagavalli and the music was given by Guru Kiran.

Song title	Singers
"Kabaddi Kabaddi"	Rajesh Krishnan, Malathi
"Kachhi Kachhi"	Udit Narayan
"Line Hodi"	Malgudi Subha, Guru Kiran
"Raja Muddu Raja"	S. Janaki, P. B. Sreenivas
"Ready Ready"	S. P. Balasubrahmanyam
"Yen Madlo"	Sundar

== Reception ==
Film critic R. G. Vijayasarathy of IANS wrote that "Auto Shankar is one of those typical mass (or it masala) films which are made in style but lack substance". B. S. Srivani of Deccan Herald wrote "Ajaykumar has written an 'original' screenplay which is heavily influenced by Telugu movies -even the scenes reek of Telugu overtones. It is sad to see a director of Rajndra Babu's calibre picturising 'reality' in such a crude manner".

== Box office ==
Auto Shankar successfully ran for 100 days. The film was released at the same time as the Puneeth Rajkumar starrer Namma Basava and there was a fierce competition between the two films. Both the films were successful at the box office, but Auto Shankar turned out to be more successful than Namma Basava.
