= Phir Milenge (2004 film) =

2004 film by Revathi

- Directed by: Revathi
- Written by: Atul Sabharwal
- Produced by: Shailendra Singh
- Starring: Shilpa Shetty; Salman Khan; Abhishek Bachchan
- Cinematography: Ravi Varman
- Edited by: Ashwin Ramanathan
- Music by: Songs: Shankar–Ehsaan–Loy; Nikhil–Vinay; Bhavatha Raja; Score: Bhavatha Raja
- Distributed by: Percept Picture Company
- Release date: 27 August 2004
- Running time: 125 minutes
- Country: India
- Language: Hindi
- Budget: ₹5.50 crore
- Box office: ₹5.43 crore

Phir Milenge (transl. We'll Meet Again) is a 2004 Indian Hindi-language drama film directed by Revathi, starring Shilpa Shetty, Salman Khan and Abhishek Bachchan. The film dealt with the subject of AIDS and was inspired by the Hollywood film Philadelphia (1993). It received critical acclaim upon its release but was unsuccessful at the box-office.

Phir Milenge is noted as one of Shetty's career-best performances which earned her widespread critical acclaim and nominations for Best Actress at the Filmfare Awards, IIFA Awards, Screen Awards, and Zee Cine Awards. Bachchan received the Zee Cine Award for Best Actor in a Supporting Role – Male for his performance in the film.

== Plot ==
Tamanna Sahni is the creative head of a top advertising agency called T.J. Associates. Her dedication, ideas, designs, and hard work have mainly contributed to the success of the agency. She leaves for a college reunion and meets her college sweetheart, Rohit Manchanda. They rekindle their love for each other and share some intimate moments together. Eventually, Rohit leaves, and Tamanna settles back into her usual routine.

When her sister, Tanya meets with an accident, she decides to donate her blood. However, her doctor, Dr. Raisingh, informs her of testing positive for HIV. Tamanna's world turns upside down, and she desperately tries to get into contact with Rohit, but in vain, as he has been hospitalised due to HIV himself.

The news of Tamanna having HIV is soon spread around the office, and she loses her job. Angered by her unfair dismissal, she searches for a lawyer to fight her case. Unfortunately, there is no law in India concerned with such cases, and all lawyers refuse to accept her case. Eventually, Tarun Anand agrees to represent her, although he had initially rejected her. Tarun seeks assistance from Lal Sir, who is his mentor and has experience handling an HIV-related case. Unfortunately, Tarun and Tamanna lose the case, and they file an appeal before the high court.

Meanwhile, Tamanna reaches out to Rohit, who is battling for his life in a hospital and dies in front of her due to AIDS.

Tarun fights the case very strongly and finally wins the case in high court. Tamanna later starts her own business venture and, after 2 years, is recognised by Business Today as one of India's young achievers. Tamanna dedicates her award to Rohit.

== Cast ==
- Shilpa Shetty as Tamanna Sahni
- Salman Khan as Rohit Manchanda
- Abhishek Bachchan as Advocate Tarun Anand
- Mita Vashisht as Advocate Kalyani
- Kamalinee Mukherjee as Tanya Sahni
- Revathi as Dr. Raisingh
- Nassar as Lal
- Raja Krishnamoorthy as TJ, Tamanna's boss
- J. V. Somayajulu as Guruji

== Soundtrack ==
Phir Milenge

Soundtrack album by Shankar–Ehsaan–Loy, Nikhil Vinay, and Bhavatha Raja
- Released: 13 July 2004 (India)
- Genre: Feature film soundtrack
- Length: 38:55
- Label: T-Series
- Producer: Suresh Balaje

Shankar-Ehsaan-Loy chronology
Lakshya (2004)	Phir Milenge (2004)	Bunty Aur Babli (2005)

Nikhil-Vinay chronology
Kaun Hai Jo Sapno Mein Aaya (2004)	Phil Milenge (2004)	Dil Bechara Pyaar Ka Maara (2004)

Bhavatha Raja chronology
Avuna (2003)	Phil Milenge (2004)	Amirtham (2006)

The music is composed by Shankar–Ehsaan–Loy, Nikhil-Vinay, and Bhavatharini with lyrics penned by Prasoon Joshi and Sameer.

Track	Song	Singer(s)	Music	Lyrics	Length
1	"Jeene Ke Ishaare"	Shankar Mahadevan	Shankar–Ehsaan–Loy	Prasoon Joshi	6:38
2	"Betab Dil Hai"	Shreya Ghoshal, Sonu Nigam	Nikhil-Vinay	Sameer	7:29
3	"Yaad Hai Woh Pehli Mulaqat"	Abhijeet (Not in the film)	Shankar–Ehsaan–Loy	Sameer	6:30
4	"Khul Ke Muskurale"	Bombay Jayashri	Shankar–Ehsaan–Loy	Prasoon Joshi	4:41
5	"Betab Dil Hai" (sad)	Sonu Nigam	Nikhil-Vinay	Sameer	3:04
6	"Khushiyon Ki Koshish"	Srinivas, Mahalaxmi Iyer	Shankar–Ehsaan–Loy	Prasoon Joshi	4:56
7	"Kuchh Pal"	Vijay Yesudas	Bhavatha Raja	Prasoon Joshi	4:35
8	"Phir Milenge"	Febi Mani, Vijay Yesudas	Bhavatha Raja	Prasoon Joshi	1:02

== Reception ==
Despite being a minor commercial success, the performances of the film were applauded. Shilpa Shetty in particular was highly applauded for her portrayal of an HIV+ patient. Her performance earned her Best Actress nominations at the Filmfare Awards, IIFA Awards, Screen Awards and Zee Cine Awards.

Jagdish Chinappa, consultant paediatrician in his review; praised the film for tackling the sensitive theme of HIV and praised the performances. "Excellent performances by Shetty, Bachchan and Khan make this film emotionally charged." He concludes his review stating "the making of this movie is a brave attempt to highlight some issues facing people with HIV. To film such a story without an eye on the box office is a tribute to the social commitment of the makers of this film." In another positive review Sanjay A Pai a consultant pathologist praised the film stating "This film shows that there is hope for Indian cinema. Whether this will translate into hope for India and the world in its struggle with AIDS remains to be seen." He also heaped praise on Shetty's performance "Shetty is marvellous in her role. She emotes well, whether as the hard working, committed advertising executive or as a grieving woman on learning her HIV status or as someone determined to fight the system. Above all, she has shown bravery in playing an unglamorous role—that of an HIV+ woman—again uncommon in Indian films. It would not surprise me if she wins accolades and awards."

Film critic Shilpa Bharatan Iyer writing for Rediff Movies also praised Shetty's performance as the lead protagonist stating "Shetty comes up with a rare, subdued performance. Her life and work have been snatched from her, but yet, she refuses to bow to circumstances." although she was less than impressed with Bachchan's performance as a lawyer stating "Bachchan pales in comparison to Denzel Washington, who played the lawyer in the Hollywood original. He lacks in oratorical skills, especially in the climax". Of the film she states "Revathi spins a sensitive tale in her second film, after Mitr, My Friend (2002). The film has been adapted well to the Indian palate, and AIDS is woven delicately into the story. It educates without being preachy, something it may have been in the danger of. It tends to drag in the first half but more than touches your heartstrings later." She concludes her review stating "Phir Milenge is worth a watch for its sensitive handling of the delicate subject of AIDS." in another positive review, critic Chitra Mahesh writing for The Hindu states "In Phir Milenge, a serious issue has been handled with sensitivity and realism. Every now and then comes a film that restores faith in cinema. And at the risk of sounding clichéd and repetitive reinforces the fact that the medium is a great platform to convey great stories, ideas and messages of hope." She was also impressed with the performance of Shetty stating "Shetty plays her role magnificently." and she praised the direction of Revathi stating "And then of course there is Revathi herself, who has crafted this entire venture with great sensitivity and empathy. Truly, a film that must be seen."

Film critic Taran Adarsh was more critical of the film says "Director Revathi deserves a pat for attempting an issue-based film [Mahesh Manjrekar's Nidaan (2000) was also based on this issue]. But it's evident that she hasn't done complete research and updated herself on the issue. Even otherwise, her storytelling is of the kind that might only appeal to a niche audience" however, he hailed Shetty's performance: "Phir Milenge belongs to Shetty completely. She delivers, what can be rightly called, the performance of her career. The viewer feels and empathizes with the character mainly because of her effective portrayal. She conveys the pain and the emotional upheaval through her expressive eyes, making it amongst the most memorable performances the year has seen so far." Namrata Joshi was also critical of the film; says "Revathi keeps her narrative low-key - be it the emotions, the dialogues, the songs or the sprinkling of warm close-ups. But often she becomes so still and stiff in her quietude that the audience cannot hear the crucial whispers." She applauded Shetty's performance stating "Shilpa gets an 'artistic' role to dig her teeth into and she gives it all the poignancy and feeling she's got. It's the fringe characters that don't get fleshed out, particularly that of Mita Vashisht, the rival lawyer who is nothing more than a caricature".

Stephen Horne praised the film and Shetty's performance stating "After years of hard work, her resume still lacked that one special film that properly allowed her to flex her acting muscles. In 2004, her big chance finally arrived when she was cast in the lead role (and received top billing to boot, a rarity for female performers in Bollywood) in the HIV awareness drama Phir Milenge ("We'll Meet Again"). And while this film's controversial subject matter ensured its dismal failure at the Indian box office, its poignant story, sensitive portrayals and heartfelt performances garnered it much praise from fans and critics alike, who all had nothing but encouraging words to offer for Shetty's work in particular. An actress was born! Bachchan hadn't yet quite hit the big time during the making of this film, but his turn as the struggling advocate Tarun gives a nice indication of the good things to come. Though he falters slightly in his numerous grandiose speeches in court, Bachchan still brings forth his usual gusto and boyish charm to deliver a memorable performance. But the backbone of Phir Milenge is undoubtedly Shetty herself who carries every single frame she appears in; her ability to portray Tamanna's pain and anguish with startling believability. Her journey from carefree, fun-loving bigshot to frightened, heartbroken outcast is played to absolute perfection".
