= Rishtey (2002 film) =

2002 Indian film by Indra Kumar

- Theatrical release poster
- Directed by: Indra Kumar
- Written by: Rajeev Kaul; Tanveer Khan; Praful Parekh
- Produced by: Indra Kumar; Ashok Thakeria
- Starring: Anil Kapoor; Karisma Kapoor; Shilpa Shetty
- Cinematography: Baba Azmi
- Edited by: Sanjay Sankla
- Music by: Sanjeev Darshan; Ranjit Barot (background score)
- Release date: 6 December 2002
- Country: India
- Language: Hindi
- Budget: ₹8.75 crore
- Box office: ₹12.37 crore

Rishtey (transl. Relationships) is a 2002 Indian Hindi-language action drama film directed by Indra Kumar. The film stars Anil Kapoor, Karisma Kapoor, Shilpa Shetty and Amrish Puri in lead roles, and is based on the 1987 film Over the Top. The film was released on 6 December 2002, and was declared as an average grosser. The film was remade in Bangladesh as Sontrashi Munna (2005) with Manna and Moushumi.

== Synopsis ==
Suraj Singh (Anil Kapoor), a lower-middle-class amateur fighter falls in love with the beautiful and wealthy Komal (Karishma Kapoor). They dream of a future together, but Komal's controlling father Yashpal Chaudhary (Amrish Puri) does not agree due to Suraj's social and economic status. Komal cuts all ties with her father and chooses to marry Suraj; she is soon pregnant. Komal and her estranged father meet at a family wedding and they reconcile. Yashpal agrees to meet Suraj at the couple's home, but when they reach, they see a provocative woman (Deepshikha) inside, wearing Komal's gown. Suraj claims that he does not know her whereas the woman states that she is Suraj's mistress. Suraj tries to prove his innocence but Komal is heartbroken and goes into premature labour and gives birth to a baby boy. Yashpal fears that the child will become a lasting link between Komal and Suraj, so he conspires to have the baby killed. Suraj overpowers the hired hit men and takes his son away to safety. Yashpal lies to Komal, telling her that Suraj has kidnapped the child.

Suraj moves to an unknown place where he raises his son Karan, by taking on multiple hard labor jobs. Over time, the father and son forge a strong relationship, and Suraj tells everyone that Karan's mother is dead. One day, Suraj meets Vaijanti (Shilpa Shetty), a quirky and lively fisherwoman who falls in love with him at first sight. She employs many different hilarious gimmicks to woo him, but to no avail. Vaijanti observes a religious fast for Suraj, a ritual which is typically done by married women. Furious, Suraj informs her that his wife is still alive and he is still in love with her. Vaijanti is heart broken but still maintains her friendship with him.

Komal has been confined to her mansion by her father, where she has become very depressed and prone to fits. The doctor tells Yashpal that it will be difficult for her to heal until she finds her son. Yashpal tracks down Suraj and creates a situation in which Komal sees father and son together. Yashpal tries to get Karan kidnapped but Suraj intervenes. Suraj is then forced to explain the truth about Komal to Karan and his friends. Komal locates their home and goes there, only to be greeted by the sight of Vaijanti doing household chores. She misunderstands Vaijanti to be Suraj's lover, insults her and then leaves feeling distraught. Desperate to know her son, and spurred on by her father, Komal begins a custody battle after which she successfully gains custody of Karan. Karan is extremely upset about being separated from Suraj and refuses to reciprocate any of her affection. Yashpal throws a lavish party to celebrate the win in court, and Suraj tries to enter the premises without permission. Yashpal manhandles Karan, humiliates Suraj and has him arrested. The shocked court judge witnesses this incident and reformulates his judgement, by setting forth a condition that Suraj must earn 15 lakh rupees in three months time, in order to prove his ability to provide for Karans' needs. If this condition is met, Suraj will be awarded full custody.

Having lost his job, Suraj decides to fight in a high stakes wrestling match in order to possibly win the prize money. In the meantime, Vaijanti comes across the woman, who originally claimed to be Suraj's mistress and suffering with leprosy now. The woman confesses that she never knew Suraj and was instead hired by Yashpal to pose as Suraj's lover, something which she deeply regrets. The truth about how Yashpal ordered Karan's death on the day he was born is also revealed. Vaijanti takes the woman to Komal's mansion and clears the air. Komal then rushes to the wrestling arena, but it has already begun. Suraj is beaten badly but regains strength upon seeing Komal. He ultimately wins and they reconcile. Yashpal then arrives and repents for his mistake, finally accepting defeat which was something he never did. They eventually become a happy family.

== Cast ==
- Anil Kapoor as Suraj Singh, Karan's father and Komal's husband.
- Karishma Kapoor as Komal Singh Chaudhary, Karan's mother, Suraj's wife and Yashpal's daughter.
- Shilpa Shetty as Vaijanti Shukla, Suraj's Love interest lady fish seller fish monger fisherwoman
- Jibraan Khan as Karan Singh, Suraj and Komal's son.
- Amrish Puri as Yashpal Chaudhary, Komal's father, Karan's grandfather and the main antagonist
- Sharat Saxena as Hussain Bakshi
- Kaivalya Chheda as Hussain Bakshi's son
- Alok Nath as Judge Gaekwad
- Sadashiv Amrapurkar as Advocate Katre
- Deepshika as Seductress Choudhary's secretary
- Arjun Firoz Khan as Manik Trainer
- Vishwajeet Pradhan as Madesh, Yashpal's assistant
- Nils Allen Stewart as Scorpio

== Soundtrack ==
Rishtey

Soundtrack album by Sanjeev-Darshan
- Released: 1 November 2002
- Genre: Feature film soundtrack
- Label: T-Series

All track composed by duo Sanjeev-Darshan. Lyrics penned by Abbas Katka except for "Apun Ko Bas" by Sumit. The song "Apna Banana Hai" is based on "Karan Mein Nazara" from the Pakistani film Choorian (1998), "Deewana Deewana" is based on the Egyptian singer Amr Diab's "Albi Ikhtarak", "Dilbar Dilbar" is based on the Moroccan singer Samira Said's "Al Bal", "Har Taraf Tu Hi Tu" is based on Amr Diab's "Baateref" and "Yaara Re" is based on Lebanese singer Diana Haddad's "Amaneh".

Title	Singer(s)
"Har Tarf Tu Hai"	Shaan, Mahalakshmi Iyer
"Rishta Tera Rishta Mera"	Udit Narayan
"Apna Bana Na Hai"	Udit Narayan, Anuradha Paudwal
"Deewana Deewana (Yeh Dil)- Male Version"	Udit Narayan
"Dilbar Dilbar"	Asha Bhosle
"Tu Tu Dil Mein"	Udit Narayan, Anuradha Paudwal
"Apun Ko Bas"	Sunidhi Chauhan, Sanjeev Rathod
"Rishta Tera Rishta Mera (Sad)"	
"Rishta Tera Rishta Mera (Sad)"	Udit Narayan
"Deewana Deewana (Yeh Dil)- Female Version"	Sunidhi Chauhan
"Yaara Re Yaara Re"	Sonu Nigam, Kavita Krishnamurthy

== Box office ==
'Rishtey' worldwide collections breakdown
Territory	Territory wise Collections break-up
India	Nett Gross: ₹5.9 crore (US$630,000)
India	Distributor share: ₹2.2 crore (US$240,000)
India	Total Gross: ₹9.7 crore (US$1.0 million)
All Time	₹37.9 crore (US$4.0 million)
Budget	₹8.7 crore (equivalent to ₹36 crore or US$3.9 million in 2026)

== Award and nominations ==
48th Filmfare Awards

- Best Supporting Actress - Shilpa Shetty
