= Shilpa Shetty =

Indian actress and host (born 1975)

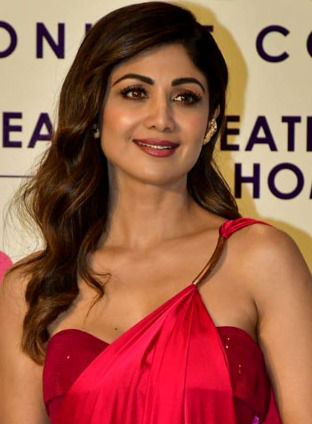
- Shetty in 2023
- Born: Ashwini Shetty; 8 June 1975 (age 51); Mangalore, Karnataka, India
- Other name: Shilpa Shetty Kundra
- Occupations: Actress; television personality
- Years active: 1993–present
- Works: Full list
- Spouse: Raj Kundra (m. 2009)
- Children: 2
- Relatives: Shamita Shetty (sister)
- Awards: Full list

Shilpa Shetty Kundra (born Ashwini Shetty, 8 June 1975) is an Indian actress who works primarily in Hindi films. She made her screen debut in the thriller Baazigar (1993) which gained her first nomination for the Filmfare Award for Best Supporting Actress. Shetty had intermittent success in the rest of the decade, such as in the action films Main Khiladi Tu Anari (1994) and Jaanwar (1999).

The romantic drama Dhadkan (2000) marked a turning point in Shetty's career. This was followed by roles in Indian (2001) and Rishtey (2002), which earned her a second Filmfare nomination for Best Supporting Actress. Shetty received praise for playing a woman with AIDS in the drama Phir Milenge (2004) and a woman in an unhappy marriage in the ensemble drama Life in a... Metro (2007). The former earned her a nomination for the Filmfare Award for Best Actress. She subsequently appeared in the action thriller Dus (2005) and the sports drama Apne (2007), and gained attention for the song "Shut Up & Bounce" from Dostana (2008). This was followed by a hiatus from acting.

In 2006, she ventured into reality television by judging the dance reality show Jhalak Dikhhla Jaa. In early 2007, Shetty joined the fifth series of the UK reality show Celebrity Big Brother, ultimately winning the series. During her stay, Shetty received international media coverage and attention for the racism she endured from several of her housemates. Her win was followed by a spot hosting the second season of the Indian version of the show, Bigg Boss in 2008. Shetty has since appeared as a judge on several dance and music reality-competition shows, including Zara Nachke Dikha (2010), Nach Baliye (2012–2020) and Super Dancer (2016–2021). She returned to acting in 2021 with the comedy film Hungama 2 and has since starred in the action series Indian Police Force (2024).

In addition to her screen work, Shetty is a celebrity endorser for various brands and products, and she has been vocal about personal issues such as feminism, vegetarianism and animal rights. Shetty has worked with PETA since 2006 as part of an advertising campaign against the use of wild animals in circuses. She is also a fitness enthusiast and she launched her own Yoga DVD in 2015. She is involved in several fitness campaigns such as the Fit India Movement, launched by the Government of India. Shetty was awarded the Champions of Change Award for her work on the Swachh Bharat Mission cleanliness campaign. From 2009 to 2015, she was a part-owner of the Indian Premier League team Rajasthan Royals.

== Early life ==
Shetty was born in Mangalore, Karnataka, into a Tulu-speaking Bunt family. Her mother, Sunanda, and late father, Surendra Shetty, were manufacturers of tamper-proof water caps for the pharmaceutical industry. Her younger sister, Shamita Shetty, is also an actress. She was educated at St. Anthony's Girls' High School in Chembur and at Podar College in Matunga. A trained Bharatanatyam dancer, she was the captain of the volleyball team at her school.

In 1991, after completing her tenth-grade exams, Shetty began her career as a model with a Limca television commercial and subsequently featured in several other commercials and advertisements, following which she began receiving offers for film roles. Shetty continued to pursue her career as a model until she became an actress.

== Career ==
=== Early success and career fluctuations (1993–1999) ===
In September 1992, Shetty signed for and began working on her first film – the romantic drama Gaata Rahe Mera Dil, to be directed by Dilip Naik which tells the story of a girl involved in a love triangle between two men (played by brothers Ronit Roy and Rohit Roy). However, the film went unreleased, which meant that Shetty's debut release was her next film, Abbas-Mustan's thriller Baazigar, alongside Shah Rukh Khan and Kajol. Inspired by the Hollywood film A Kiss Before Dying (1956), the film featured Shetty in the supporting role of Seema Chopra, a girl who is murdered by her revenge-seeking boyfriend, played by Khan. Baazigar proved to be a major box office hit and finished up as the fourth-highest-grossing film of the year. Both the film as well as Shetty's performance received critical appreciation; Shetty received nominations for Best Female Debut and Best Supporting Actress at the annual Filmfare Awards ceremony.

In 1994, Shetty had three film releases. Her first release that year was the action drama Aag, in which she played her first leading role. Co-starring Govinda and debutant Sonali Bendre, the film saw Shetty portray Bijli, a village belle who is actually an undercover policewoman assigned to arrest a murderer (played by Govinda) at any cost. Aag emerged as a moderate box office success and fetched mixed critical reviews, as did Shetty's performance. Shetty next starred alongside Akshay Kumar, Saif Ali Khan, Raageshwari and Shakti Kapoor in the action comedy Main Khiladi Tu Anari. In the film, Shetty played the dual roles of Mona (a cabaret dancer and a gangster's girlfriend) and her look-alike Basanti (a humble village girl). The film, which marked Shetty's first of many collaborations with Kumar, proved to be a super hit at the box office, becoming the sixth-highest-grossing film of the year with revenues of ₹138.4 million (US$1.5 million). Both the film as well as Shetty's performance received major critical acclaim; the success of Main Khiladi Tu Anari proved to be a breakthrough for Shetty. Her third and final release that year was the romantic drama Aao Pyaar Karen opposite Saif Ali Khan. The film, which narrates the love story of a wealthy man and his maid (played by Khan and Shetty respectively), underperformed at the box office.

Shetty starred in Hathkadi (1995), where she was working alongside actors such as Saif Ali Khan, Govinda and Madhoo, but it failed at the box office. The following year, she made her Tamil film debut with Mr. Romeo, opposite Prabhu Deva and Madhoo. The film was a sleeper musical hit at the box office and she also earned Filmfare Award for Best Actress – Telugu nomination for her performance as a mermaid in the successful film Sahasa Veerudu Sagara Kanya (1996), opposite Venkatesh. The year 1997 proved to be one of the busiest in her career, as she appeared in five films, beginning with Insaaf, Zameer: The Awakening of a Soul, and Prithvi, all of which failed commercially. Her first major Bollywood film of that year was the action thriller Auzaar, where she portrayed the character of Prathna Thakur alongside actors Salman Khan and Sanjay Kapoor. She also starred in the Telugu comedy Veedevadandi Babu, directed by E. V. V. Satyanarayana, which performed averagely but was later regarded by The Times of India as one of the funniest films of all time in Tollywood.

In 1998, she had three release, Pardesi Babu, alongside Govinda and Raveena Tandon, for which she received critical acclaim and won the Bollywood Movie Award for Best Supporting Actress for her performance. That year, she also made her Kannada film debut with Ravichandran’s romantic drama Preethsod Thappa, which is considered one of his notable musical hits. She appeared in Jaanwar (1999) alongside Akshay Kumar and Karishma Kapoor, playing a mother who is separated from her child. The film was a box office success, and Sukanya Verma of Rediff.com stated, "Shilpa is appealing as the grieved mother". That year also saw her feature in the widely popular item number "Main Aayi Hoon U.P. Bihar Lootne," choreographed by Ahmed Khan for the action crime film Shool. Bella Jaisinghani of The Indian Express wrote, "Shool's USP is Shilpa Shetty's song 'Main Aayi Hoon U.P. Bihar Lootne.'"

=== Critical acclaim and commercial success (2000–2006) ===
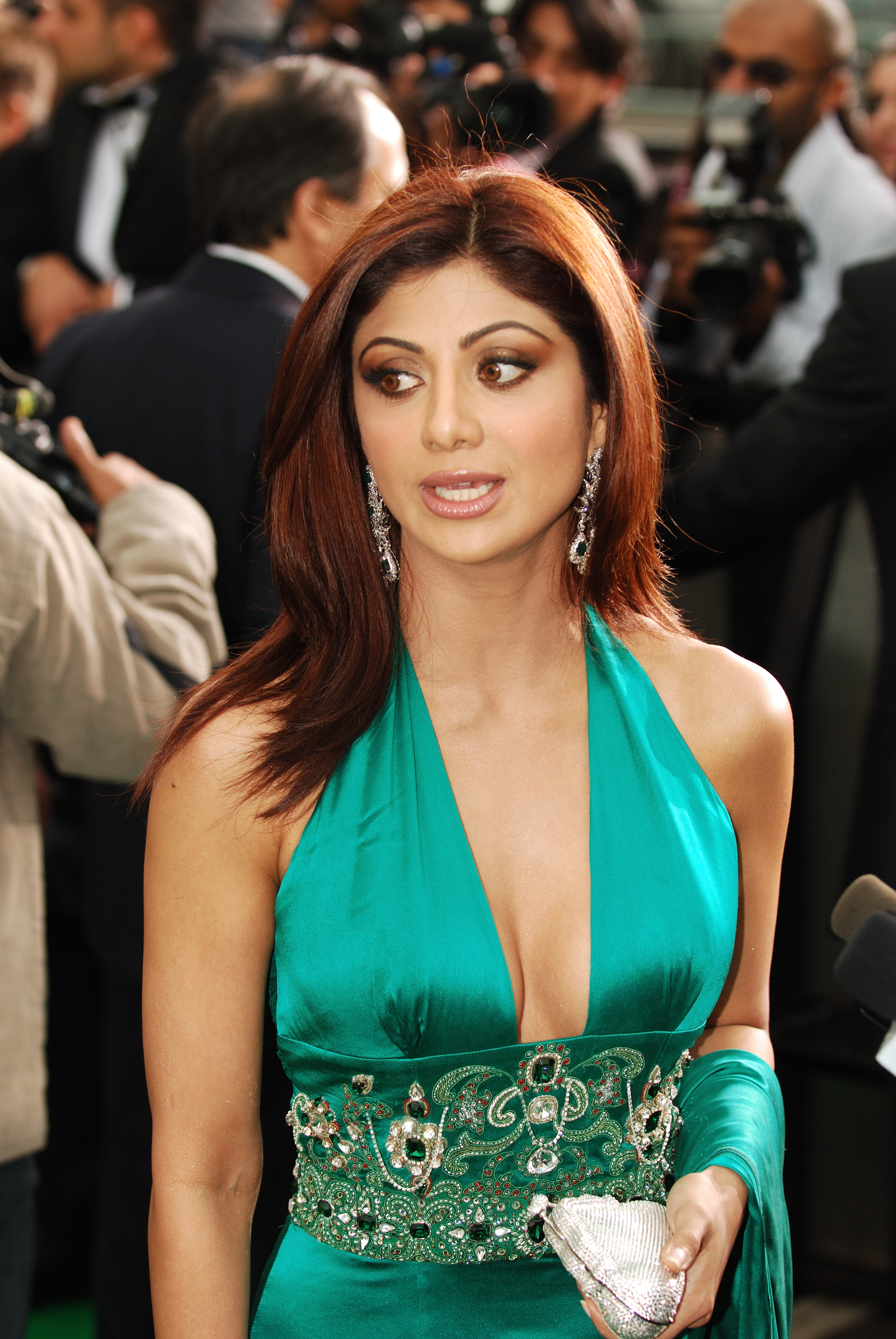
Shetty at IIFA Awards 2007

In 2000, Shetty received acclaim for her role in Dharmesh Darshan's musical romantic drama Dhadkan, where she played a young woman forced for an arrange marriage opposite Akshay Kumar and Suniel Shetty. A loose adaptation of Emily Brontë’s Wuthering Heights, the film earned ₹264.7 million (US$2.8 million) and emerged as a moderate success at the box office. Her performance earned her several Best Actress nominations at various award ceremonies, including the IIFA Awards. Padmaraj Nair of Screen remarked, "Shilpa gets the best role of her career and doesn't disappoint". Taran Adarsh of Bollywood Hungama wrote, “The life of the enterprise is undoubtedly Shilpa Shetty, who looks good, delivers her lines effectively, and emotes with utmost conviction.” She was also seen alongside Nagarjuna in Vyjayanthi Movies’ Azad, which ran for 100 days in theatres and became a profitable venture in Telugu cinema. However, her other release that year failed at the box office.

Shetty played a police inspector's wife opposite Sunny Deol in the 2001 action Indian. The film grossed ₹540 million (US$5.8 million) worldwide, becoming the fourth highest-grossing Hindi film of the year, although her performance received a mixed response.

Shetty had six releases in 2002, with only starred Rishtey opposite Anil Kapoor, being a box office success. Her comic performance as an eccentric fisherwoman was appreciated and she received her second nomination for the Filmfare Award for Best Supporting Actress, in addition to nominations for Best Comedian as well.

Shetty's first release of 2004 was the police drama Garv: Pride and Honour, in which she portrayed a Muslim orphan and disillusioned table dancer starring opposite Salman Khan. According to Shetty, she chose to do the film because she liked the subject. Later that year, she received widespread critical acclaim for her performance in Phir Milenge, in which she played a successful city high-flyer who contracts HIV from unprotected sex and becomes a social outcast as a result opposite Salman Khan and Abhishek Bachchan. The film, based on 1993's Philadelphia, was perceived to have tackled a social taboo as yet unaddressed by Bollywood. The film earned Shetty a Filmfare Award for Best Actress nomination and provided an impetus for her HIV-related charity work (see below. Taran Adarsh noted: "Phir Milenge belongs to Shetty completely. She delivers, what can be rightly called, the performance of her career." This marked a break from the previous trend of superficial song-and-dance items in favour of roles that have a greater depth of character.

Shetty's first film of 2005 was Dus, an action thriller. Although it received average returns at the box office, Shetty stated that she had taken the role to reinvent herself by portraying the rather unconventional character of an anti-terrorist squad member. She then starred opposite Upendra in the Kannada film Auto Shankar. The film was a major box office success and it earned her the name "The Gabbar Singh of the South" due to her villainous role in the film. She also earned nomination for Filmfare Award for Best Actress – Kannada. In the same year, she starred in the film Fareb with her younger sister Shamita Shetty. Shetty had one release in 2006, the much delayed Shaadi Karke Phas Gaya Yaar. The film was a box office flop, but she got good reviews for her role as a not entirely likeable wife. In 2006, she also became a judge alongside Farah Khan and Sanjay Leela Bhansali on Jhalak Dikhhla Jaa.

=== Further recognition and Celebrity Big Brother (2007–2009) ===
In January 2007, Shetty was a contestant and the subsequent winner of the British reality television series Celebrity Big Brother 5. She was the first Indian celebrity included in the show. Reportedly paid Rs.31.5 m (£367,500&) for her participation, she said to presenter Davina McCall, "I just want every Indian to be extremely proud that I'm in here". As for her participation, she stated: "I have zero expectations. The only thing I really hope to keep is my self-respect and my dignity." Her sister Shamita told The Times of India that this "is the boldest decision Shilpa has taken so far." During her stay on the show, Shetty instructed fellow housemates Carole Malone and Ken Russell in meditation and flirted with Dirk Benedict but tempers started to fray by Day 7 as a clique formed in the house disapproving of Shilpa's presence. Following a worldwide controversy that publicised her as a target of racist bullying within the house, Shetty won the contest after gaining 63% of the public vote and described the experience as "incredible and overwhelming". She further thanked the public for "a fantastic opportunity to make my country proud". In August 2008, Shetty began hosting the second season of the reality television series Bigg Boss, the Indian version of the international reality television series Big Brother.

2007 proved to be another successful year for Shetty. Her first release, Life in a... Metro, received widespread critical acclaim and became the first Bollywood film to premiere at Leicester Square, London. She portrayed a woman in an unhappy marriage opposite Kay Kay Menon and Shiney Ahuja. Shetty's performance was widely appreciated: Rajeev Masand noted: "It's a terrific performance and unquestionably Shetty's best to date". Raja Sen stated, "This is Shilpa's best-ever performance, nuanced and real, raw enough to feel". The film was a surprise commercial success at the box office. Her second release, alongside three Deols (Dharmendra, Sunny and Bobby), the family drama Apne, was also a major box office success. She played Sunny's wife in the film. In 2008, Shetty had a special dance appearance in Dostana. Following this, she took a hiatus from acting in films.

=== Television judge and intermittent acting work (2010–present) ===
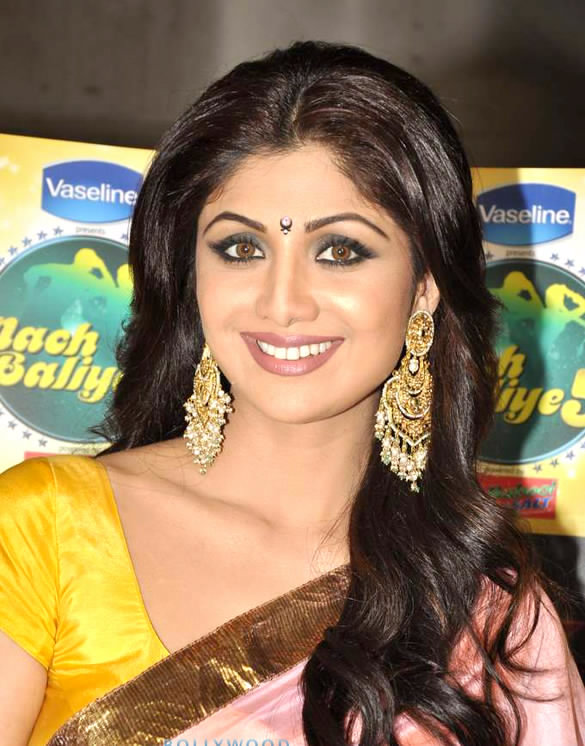
Shetty in 2013

Shetty starred in the unreleased 2010 Indo-Chinese drama The Desire, a film rescued during production by her mother, who stepped in when its producer abandoned the project unfinished. Alongside Sajid Khan and Terrence Lewis, Shetty was featured as a talent judge for the dance reality show Nach Baliye (seasons 5, 6 and Shriman v/s Shrimati), from 2012 to 2014. In March 2014, Shetty began hosting the reality television show Soney Ka Dil, which she also co-produced along with Kundra. The show format is based on featuring ordinary people who have contributed their extraordinary help to others in need. The same year, Shetty became a film producer with the action film Dishkiyaaoon, a box-office flop. Since early 2016, she has been judging the dance reality show Super Dancer on Sony Entertainment channel along with co-judges Geeta Kapoor and Anurag Basu.

Shetty's only appearance on-screen during her break was in the 2014 film Dishkiyaoon, where she appeared in the song 'Tu Mere Type Ka Nahi Hai'. She made her comeback to films after 14 years, with the 2021 film Hungama 2 which received widely negative reviews. In 2022, she appeared in Nikamma alongside Abhimanyu Dassani and Shirley Setia. She then starred in the 2023 female-led comedy Sukhee opposite Amit Sadh and Chaitanya Choudhry, where she played a wife who takes a break from her life to reunite with her friends.

Shetty expanded to web with Rohit Shetty's 2024 series Indian Police Force, joining as the first female cop in his Cop universe. Trisha Bhattacharya of India Today noted, "Tara played by Shilpa Shetty was a quirky casting pick! Initially, her lines felt a tad forced, but as the show rolled on, it just became better." Shetty will next return to Kannada films after 18 years, with KD - The Devil.

== Off-screen work ==
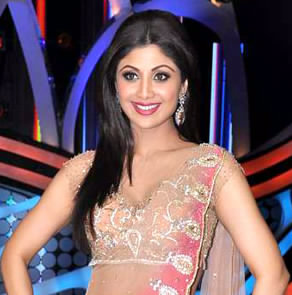
Shetty on the set of Nach Baliye 5 as judge

In February 2006, Shetty lent support to a BBC World Service Trust television show designed to tackle the problem of HIV-AIDS in India. According to reports, she participated in order to show solidarity with HIV-AIDS sufferers. According to Shetty, the issue was particularly close to her heart as she had portrayed an HIV-positive sufferer in her 2004 film Phir Milenge. Speaking about the film and HIV in general, Shetty said: "Why not a film on HIV positive patients? It is a social stigma in our society. We made this film to highlight this problem ... This film will bring about social awareness about AIDS in our country. It is high time we talked about this in our society".

In March 2006, various sources reported Shetty's joining PETA as part of an advertising campaign against the use of wild animals in circuses. According to a PETA India press release, Shetty is a long-time PETA supporter and has assisted the campaign by posing for photographs in a figure-hugging tiger costume. She explained that her crouching in a cage was uncomfortable during the photoshoot, but that her discomfort was insignificant compared to the pain suffered by the creatures. "These once dignified animals only leave their cages, which are barely larger than the size of their bodies, for a few minutes each day to be forced into the ring to perform tricks which make no sense and are upsetting to them. The best way to help animals suffering in circuses is to boycott the circus". Shetty revealed in a later interview that she felt strongly about this cause and that she was appalled to hear of the cruel treatment suffered by such animals. "I thought I should stop that. If I can make a little difference to their lives, why not go for it?"

Shetty holds a black belt in karate. She launched her fitness Yoga DVD in 2015. In February 2009, Shetty and Raj Kundra became part owners of the Indian Premier League franchise cricket team Rajasthan Royals by paying approximately US$15.4 million for an 11.7% stake. Shetty also co-owns the Indian chain of spas and salon called Iosis. In 2017, The Indian government selected Shetty as a brand ambassador of the Swachh Bharat Mission, a campaign to improve sanitation throughout India. On 20 January 2020, she received the Champions of Change award for her work in that campaign.

In 2021, edible oils and food products company B.L. Agro Industries announced her as the brand ambassador for their food offerings brand Nourish under categories pulses, dry fruits and flours. In 2023, she invested Rs 2.25 crore in Shark Tank India fame WickedGud. She has also been an early investor of Mamaearth, an Indian cosmetic brand. Shetty owns a restaurant in Mumbai named INKA.

== Legal issues and controversies ==
=== Obscenity charge ===
In April 2006, a Madurai court issued non-bailable warrants against Shetty and actress Reema Sen for "posing in an obscene manner" in photographs published by a Tamil newspaper. The report stated that the two actresses had failed to comply with earlier summonses, hence the issuance of the warrants. The petitioner submitted that the paper had published "very sexy and medium blow-ups" in its December 2005 and January 2006 issues, and alleged that these violated the Indecent Representation of Women (Prohibition) Act 1986, Young Persons (Harmful Publications) Act 1956, and the Indian Penal Code Section 292 (Sale of Obscene Books). The petitioner further demanded that the images be confiscated under the terms of the Press and Registration of Book Act 1867. The district court granted anticipatory bail to actress Shilpa Shetty, her husband Raj Kundra in a cheating case filed by a textile firm owner. Defence lawyer Aniket Nikam told the court that the accused had no intention to cheat, adding that BDTV had already paid Rs 1 crore to the complainant and only Rs 24 lakh were due.

Shetty responded that she had not received any court summons and also discounted the charges. She further claimed that the pictures were freeze-frame shots from a recent film that only exposed her navel. "As far as my photographs go, what is obscene about it? If navel-showing is obscenity, then our traditional Indian outfit – the traditional sari – should be banned in the first place."

In January 2007, outgoing Chief Justice Y.K. Sabharwal confirmed that Shetty had written to him requesting that he enunciate guidelines against frivolous lawsuits against the artists, but he had refused her plea on the grounds that she should have filed a formal petition instead of writing a letter.

=== Target of racism ===
During her stay on Celebrity Big Brother 5, Shetty was the target of racism and bullying by some other housemates, chiefly Jade Goody, Jo O'Meara and Danielle Lloyd. After correcting Goody's mother, who mispronounced Shetty's name as 'Shiwpa', Shetty was mocked for her Indian accent and was branded "The Indian" and was referred to as a "dog" by Lloyd. Referring to Shetty, O'Meara generalised that all Indians were thin because they were "sick all the time" as a result of undercooking their food, following their belief that Shetty had undercooked a chicken, which had given O'Meara diarrhoea. Lloyd also mentioned that she disliked Shetty touching her food because she did not "know where her hands have been".

After Shetty had attempted to dispose of the left-over chicken soup down the toilet and had caused a blockage, housemate Jack Tweed suggested that she should pick the bones out with her teeth and allegedly referred to her as a "fucking Paki", although show producers denied this and stated that the word used was "cunt". During a fierce argument, Goody told Shetty that she needed to "spend a day in the slums", although the media falsely reported this as "go back to the slums". Claiming that she did not know Shilpa's surname, Goody referred to her as "Shilpa Fuckawallah", "Shilpa Daroopa", and "Shilpa Poppadom", later claiming that they were non-racist references to Indian food. Lloyd had opined that Shetty's English-speaking skills were lacking and said she should "fuck off home".

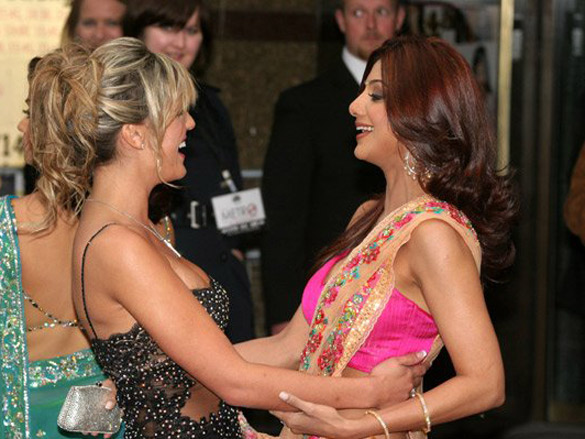
Danielle Lloyd (left) and Shetty (right) at Life in a... Metro premiere at London's Leicester Square, 2007.

Shetty had been reduced to tears on several occasions, telling fellow housemate Ian Watkins, "I feel like I'm losing my dignity." After the show, Goody stated that she understood her comments appeared as racist and apologised for any offence caused. On 14 February 2007, Shetty said "Jade and Danielle did apologise. And I've forgiven them. Anyone, who knows me, knows I forgive and forget easily." On 17 February 2007, Shetty said that she wanted to forgive Jo O'Meara, but she and other Celebrity Big Brother contestants had difficulty contacting her. After Goody apologised to Shetty for her behaviour, Tweed stated that he was very disappointed with Goody for apologising, and called Shetty a "dick" after previously describing her as a "wanker". Shetty speculated that she might be a victim of racism, but later retracted it by claiming: "People say things in anger." In May 2007, Lloyd attended the premiere of Shetty's film Life in a... Metro in London, in which the two were photographed together.

The screening of the racial comments on UK television resulted in national and international media coverage, responses from the UK and Indian governments, and the show's suspension during the 2008 season. Many agencies and corporations cancelled their contracts with the housemates accused of racism, citing the allegations as the reason for the terminations. Also, many sponsors of the Big Brother series cancelled or suspended their sponsorship of the show. After conducting an investigation, Ofcom ruled that Channel 4 had breached the Ofcom code of conduct, and statutory sanctions were placed on the network.

=== Richard Gere kissing incident ===
On 15 April 2007, the American actor Richard Gere hugged and kissed Shetty repeatedly on the cheek during an AIDS-awareness event. In response, a number of protesters, including members of the political party Shiv Sena, beat burning the effigies of Gere with sticks. The protests occurred in a variety of cities, including Varanasi, Bhopal, Kanpur, Indore, Delhi and Mumbai. Others set fire to glamour shots of Shetty. Some groups demanded an apology from her and threatened to ban her movies in the state. Shiv Sena leaders denied involvement in the protests, but Shiv Sena member of Parliament Sanjay Raut observed that the protests are "just a manifestation of the anger of the general public" and that there was "nothing wrong with expressing contempt at such an act".

Shetty responded to these protests by saying, "I understand this (kissing) is his (Gere's) culture, not ours. But this was not a big thing or so obscene for people to overreact in such a manner. I struggle to understand these people's sentiments, but mainly I do not want a foreigner to take bad memories from here." On 26 April 2007, an Indian court in Rajasthan issued a warrant for Shetty and Gere's arrest. A two-judge bench of the Supreme Court headed by the Chief Justice of India subsequently dismissed the suit and suspended the arrest warrants. While the charge against Gere was dropped soon after the incident, the charge against Shetty was not formally dismissed until January 2022. Gere has since expressed regret for causing any offence and Shetty has said: "so much has been blown out of proportion".

=== Other cases ===
In August 2025, Mumbai police have filed a case against Shilpa Shetty and her husband Raj Kundra for reportedly stealing ₹60.4 crore from a businessman in a loan-cum-investment deal in their old company (now defunct), Best Deal TV Private Limited.

== Personal life ==
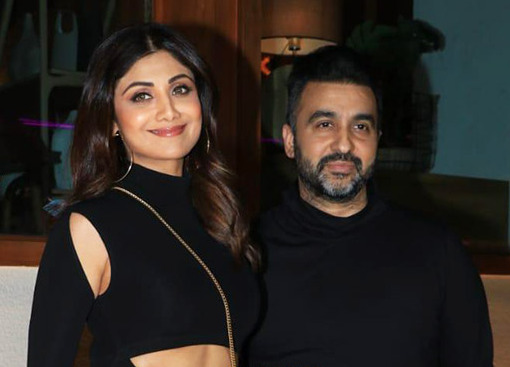
Shetty with her husband Raj Kundra in 2020

Having worked with Akshay Kumar in Main Khiladi Tu Anari (1994), Shetty began dating him on the set of Insaaf (1997), the latter having just broken up with actress Raveena Tandon. Shetty spoke openly about her relationship with Kumar. The couple broke up in 2000 while filming Dhadkan.

In February 2009, Shetty got engaged to businessman Raj Kundra, with whom she was co-owner of the Indian Premier League cricket team Rajasthan Royals. The two married on 22 November 2009. Shetty gave birth to a son on 21 May 2012. The couple had a second child, a girl, on 15 February 2020 via surrogacy.

== In the media ==
Shetty consider as among one of the extremely beautiful leading actresses of the 90s. Nayanika Das of Filmfare termed Shetty the "most vivacious and hard-working" actress. Shetty has appeared in Forbes India's Celebrity 100 list from 2012 to 2016 and 2019. She ranked at 58th position with an estimated annual income of ₹126 million (US$1.3 million) in her debut. In 2019, she ranked 75th with an estimated annual income of ₹22.6 million (US$240,000).

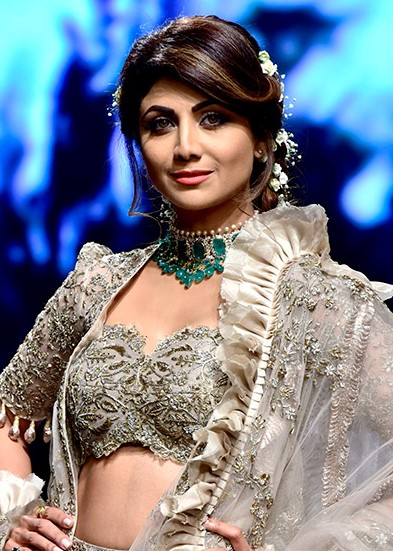
Shetty in 2018

Rediff.com named Shetty the "Most Powerful Actress" of 2007. The actress is also known for her dancing skills. In Times' Most Desirable Women list, she was placed 10th in 2009 and 27th in 2010. In 2009, she ranked 8th in Maxim's "Hot 100" list. Shetty is a celebrity endorser for brands and products such as Pantene, Yakult, Kesh King, Mamaearth, B Natural and Fast & Up. Shetty was placed 59th in "Google Top 100 Most Searched Asians" list of 2022. Shetty has also received the Rajiv Gandhi Award in 2007. Times of India's placed her in its "50 Beautiful Faces" list and Rediff.com placed her in "Best Dressed Woman" list.

In February 2007, Shetty attended a reception at the House of Commons by invitation of Keith Vaz MP to meet with then Prime Minister Tony Blair. She was also invited to meet Queen Elizabeth II at Marlborough House in London in March 2007. Shetty was the subject of a Sky One documentary entitled The Real Shilpa Shetty, produced by British television production company Twofour. The large number of commercial offers that Shilpa received after winning Celebrity Big Brother 5 themselves became a reason for controversy with an increasing number of accusations about her riding the "racism" wave to commercial gain. She was on the cover of the first issue of OK! Magazine in India. In 2007, she also modelled at the Wills Lifestyle India Fashion Week. In 2019 the actress, who has long been the poster girl for fitness, launched a holistic wellness app, The Shilpa Shetty app, which features yoga routines, functional training, special regimes (for women who are pregnant, struggling with menstrual cramps and so on), and daily nutrition charts for each program. "I think lifestyle modifications are the need of the hour. There's something for everyone on the app. You can do the workouts within the comfort of your home, without any equipment," Shilpa says. In 2009, Shetty was among the 10 recipients of the IIFA-FICCI Frames Awards for the "Most Powerful Entertainers of the Decade". Shetty has received an Honorary Doctorate from the University of Leeds.

== Awards and nominations ==
Shetty has received four Filmfare Awards nominations: Best Female Debut for Baazigar, Best Supporting Actress for Baazigar and Rishtey, and Best Actress for Phir Milenge.

Preceded by Chantelle Houghton	Celebrity Big Brother UK winner Series 5 (2007)	Succeeded by Ulrika Jonsson
