= Raveena Tandon filmography =

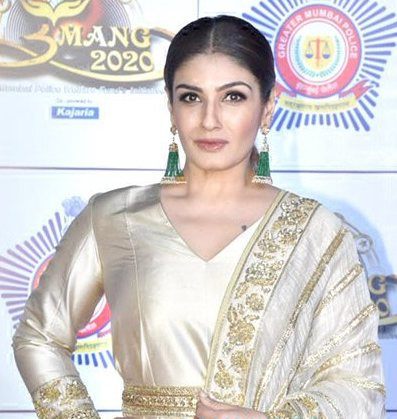
Tandon in 2020

Raveena Tandon is an Indian actress known for her work in Hindi films. She made her acting debut in the 1991 action film Patthar Ke Phool, which earned her the Filmfare Award for New Face of the Year. This was followed by a series of unsuccessful films including Ek Hi Raasta and Parampara (both 1993). In 1994, she appeared in eight Hindi films, most of them were commercial successes. Among these were two of the top-grossing films – the romantic musical drama Dilwale and the action drama Mohra. The success of the latter marked a turning point in her career, establishing Tandon as a leading actress in Hindi cinema. The same year, her performance in the drama Laadla, earned her a nomination for the Filmfare Award for Best Supporting Actress. Her other film was the comedy Andaz Apna Apna, which though initially a box office disappointment, attained cult status over the years.

Tandon subsequently played leading roles in the action thrillers Khiladiyon Ka Khiladi (1996) and Ziddi (1997). Both films were among the highest grossing Bollywood films of their respective years. In 1998, she starred opposite Govinda in the commercially successful comedies Dulhe Raja, and Bade Miyan Chote Miyan. Tandon had five film releases in 1999. While the comedy Anari No.1 was a commercial success, her other four releases that year performed poorly at the box office. Nevertheless, she received praise for her performance in the crime drama Shool.

In the early 2000s, she ventured into more serious dramatic roles and turned towards arthouse cinema. She received critical acclaim for her performances in them. She won the National Film Award for Best Actress for playing a victim of domestic abuse in the 2001 social drama Daman. The same year, her performance in the supernatural thriller Aks won her the Filmfare Special Performance Award. She received further praise for portraying a politician in Madhur Bhandarkar's 2003 drama Satta. Later, she starred on the Sahara One television series Sahib Biwi Gulam, Rituparno Ghosh's adaptation of Bimal Mitra's novel. After her marriage in 2004, she took a break from films, appearing occasionally on television. In 2012, she hosted a talk show titled Issi Ka Naam Zindagi on NDTV.

== Films ==
Key
†	Denotes films that have not yet been released

- All films are in Hindi unless otherwise noted.

Year	Title	Role	Notes	Ref(s)
1991	Patthar Ke Phool	Kiran Khanna	Filmfare Award for Lux New Face of the Year	
1992	Jeena Marna Tere Sang	Asha		
1993	Divya Shakti	Priya		
1993	Kshatriya	Neelima		
1993	Ratha Saradhi	Rekha	Telugu film	
1993	Parampara	Vijaya		
1993	Pehla Nasha	Avantika Bajaj		
1993	Bangaru Bullodu	Priya	Telugu film	
1993	Ek Hi Raasta	Priya Choudhry		
1994	Zamane Se Kya Darna	Anju Rajpal		
1994	Dilwale	Sapna Puri		
1994	Insaniyat	Salma		
1994	Imtihaan	Preeti		
1994	Laadla	Kajal	Nominated—Filmfare Award for Best Supporting Actress	
1994	Andaz Apna Apna	Raveena alias Karishma		
1994	Aatish	Nisha		
1994	Mohra	Roma Singh		
1994	Main Khiladi Tu Anari	Herself	Guest appearance	
1994	Sadhu	Selvi	Tamil film	
1995	Taqdeerwala	Lilly		
1995	Zamaana Deewana	Priya Singh		
1995	Saajan Ki Baahon Mein	Sapna Narang		
1996	Vijeta	Vijaya		
1996	Khiladiyon Ka Khiladi	Priya		
1996	Rakshak	Herself	Special appearance in song "Shahar Ki Ladki"	
1997	Anjaane			
1997	Ziddi	Jaya		
1997	Daava	Seema		
1997	Ghulam-E-Mustafa	Kavita		
1997	Deewana Mastana	Herself	Cameo appearance	
1998	Keemat – They Are Back	Sharmili		
1998	Vinashak	Kajal		
1998	Salaakhen	Neha		
1998	Aunty No. 1	Sandhya		
1998	Gharwali Baharwali	Kajal		
1998	Dulhe Raja	Kiran Singhania		
1998	Barood	Neha Singhal		
1998	Bade Miyan Chote Miyan	Seema		
1998	Pardesi Babu	Karuna		
1999	Anari No.1	Sapna		
1999	Jai Hind	Gulnar		
1999	Rajaji	Payal		
1999	Shool	Manjari Singh		
1999	Gair	Madhu		
1999	Upendra	Keerthi	Kannada film	
2000	Tune Mera Dil Le Liya			
2000	Jung	Naina		
2000	Bulandi	Meena		
2000	Khauff	Herself	Cameo appearance	
2000	Kahin Pyaar Na Ho Jaaye	Nisha		
2000	Ghaath	Herself	Cameo appearance	
2001	Daman: A Victim of Marital Violence	Durga	Credited as Raveena; National Film Award for Best Actress	
2001	Aks	Neeta	Filmfare Award for Special Performance	
2001	Akasa Veedhilo	Indu	Telugu film	
2001	Aalavandhan	Tejaswini Teju	Tamil film	
2001	Abhay	Tejaswini Teju		
2001	Officer	Meenal alias Pari		
2002	Akhiyon Se Goli Maare	Kiran Bhangare		
2002	Soch	Preeti Sardesai		
2002	Agni Varsha	Vishaka		
2002	Waah! Tera Kya Kehna	Inspector Salma Khan		
2003	Satta	Anuradha Sehgal		
2003	Pran Jaye Par Shaan Na Jaye	Laxmi Rathod		
2003	Stumped	Reema Seth	Also producer	
2003	Qayamat: City Under Threat	Mamta	Special appearnace in the song "Mujhe Tumse Mohabbat Hai"	
2003	LOC: Kargil	Deepak's wife		
2004	Jaago	Shraddha		
2004	Yeh Lamhe Judaai Ke	Jaya		
2004	Police Force: An Inside Story	Roma		
2004	Aan: Men at Work	Roshni Verma		
2004	Ek Se Badhkar Ek	Kanchan Dhillon		
2004	Dobara	Ria		
2005	Pehchaan: The Face of Truth	Mridula	Also producer	
2006	Sandwich	Nisha		
2010	Laboratory	Sohini	Bengali film	
2011	Bbuddah... Hoga Terra Baap	Kamini	Cameo appearance	
2014	Pandavulu Pandavulu Tummeda	Satya	Telugu film	
2015	Bombay Velvet	Club singer	Cameo appearance	
2015	Jai Hind	Evana "Eve" Chaudhary	Short film	
2015	2 Chehare	Radha		
2017	Maatr	Vidya Chauhan		
2017	Hanuman Da' Damdaar	Añjanā (voice)		
2017	Shab	Sonal Modi		
2019	Khandaani Shafakhana	Herself	Special appearance in song "Sheher Ki Ladki"	
2022	K.G.F: Chapter 2	Ramika Sen	Kannada film	
2023	One Friday Night	Lata Verma		
2024	Patna Shuklla	Tanvi Shukla		
2024	Ghudchadi	Menaka		
2025	Inn Galiyon Mein	Sapna Joshi		
2026	Welcome to the Jungle	Zoya		
2026	Vishwanath & Sons	Anjali Vishwanath	Tamil film	
2027	A for Anand †	TBA	Kannada film	

== Television ==
Year	Title	Role	Notes	Ref.
2004	Sahib Biwi Gulam	Choti Bahu		
2008	Chak De Bachche	Judge	Reality dance show	
2009	Chhote Miyan	Judge	Reality comedy show	
2011	Comedy Ka Maha Muqabala	Judge	Reality comedy show	
2012	Issi Ka Naam Zindagi	Host	Talk show	
2014	CEO's Got Talent	Judge	Talent show	
2014	Simply Baatien with Raveena	Host	Talk show	
2017	Sabse Bada Kalakar	Judge	Kids Reality Show	
2019	Nach Baliye 9	Judge	Reality Dance Show	
2020	Fabulous Lives of Bollywood Wives	Herself	Guest	
2021	Aranyak	Kasturi Dogra		
2024	Karmma Calling	Indrani Kothari		

== Music videos ==
Year	Title	Performer	Ref.
2013	"Betiyaan" (Save the Girl Child)	Shankar Mahadevan, Sunidhi Chauhan, Sonu Nigam	

=== Music song ===
- 2003: Appeared in Hum Ko To Hai Poora Yakeen made by msn cricket and sports (MSN India) to support The Indian Cricket team for the ICC Cricket World Cup 2003
