= Sahib Biwi Gulam =

Indian television series

- Genre: Drama
- Based on: Saheb Bibi Golam by Bimal Mitra
- Directed by: Amitava Bhattacharya; Indraneil Goswami
- Creative director: Rituparno Ghosh
- Starring: see below
- Theme music composer: Raju Singh
- Opening theme: "Sahib Biwi Gulam" by Sapna Mukherjee
- Country of origin: India
- Original language: Hindi
- No. of seasons: 1
- No. of episodes: 104

Production
- Producers: Pallavi Chatterjee; Tripti Sharma
- Production locations: Kolkata, West Bengal
- Cinematography: Vivek Banerjee
- Camera setup: Multi-camera
- Running time: Approx. 23 minutes

Original release
- Network: Sahara One
- Release: 23 March – 23 September 2004

Sahib Biwi Gulam (transl. King, Queen and Knave) is an Indian television series aired on Sahara One channel. The series is based on the 1953 Bengali novel Saheb Bibi Golam by Bimal Mitra. The star of the series is Raveena Tandon. The series was shot in Kolkata, West Bengal, and was directed by Amitava Bhattacharya.

== Cast ==
- Raveena Tandon as Chhoti Bahu
- Ayub Khan as Chote Babu
- Arjun Chakraborty as Majhle Babu
- Roopa Ganguly as Majhli Bahu
- Mouli Ganguly as Jaba
- Rajesh Shringarpure as Bhootnath
- Benjamin Gilani as Subinay Babu
- Zeb Khan as Nannhe Babu
- Kabir Sadanand as Nanni Gopal
- Aparna Bhatnagar as Chunnidasi
- Vaquar Shaikh as Natu Dutt
- Masood Akhtap as Bansi
- Neha Amandeep
