= Saheb Bibi Golam (film) =

- Directed by: Kartik Chatterjee
- Written by: Bimal Mitra
- Screenplay by: Bimal Mitra, (Lyrics - Pranob Roy)
- Based on: Saheb Bibi Golam by Bimal Mitra
- Produced by: Khagendralal Chattopadhyay
- Starring: Sumitra Devi; Uttam Kumar; Chhabi Biswas; Pahari Sanyal; Chhaya Devi
- Cinematography: Amulya Mukherjee
- Edited by: Haridas Mahalanbish
- Music by: Rabin Chattopadhyay
- Production company: Sarkar Production Pvt Ltd
- Distributed by: Nandan Pictures Limited
- Release date: 1956
- Running time: 149 minutes
- Country: India
- Language: Bengali

Saheb Bibi Golam is a 1956 Bengali film directed by Kartik Chatterjee. It is based on a Bengali novelist Bimal Mitra's 1953 novel of the same name. The film explores the tragic fall of feudalism in Bengal during the British Raj. The title of the movie and the story is a reference to the plot simultaneously exploring a platonic relationship between a beautiful, forlorn wife of an aristocrat and a career-driven clerk. The film stars Sumitra Devi, Uttam Kumar, Chhabi Biswas, Pahari Sanyal.

This film is considered to be one of the greatest Bengali films ever made. The storyline is based on the backdrop of the British rule in India and deals with the shocking downfall of Bengal feudalism during that period. Featuring Uttam Kumar, Sumitra Devi along with Chhabi Biswas this film is one of the best Bengali films that has ever been made and was later saw a Hindi remake titled ‘Sahib Bibi Aur Ghulam’ that proved to be one of the most critically acclaimed Bollywood movies. The film is considered one of Best Bengali films ever made.

== Plot ==
The film opens at the ruins of an old haveli in Calcutta, where a group of labourers are busy pulling down what remains. When the workers break off for lunch, the overseer (Uttam Kumar) wanders through the mansion. As he sits at a place there begins a flashback to the end of the 19th century.

The lower-class and educated Bhutnath arrives in colonial Calcutta looking for work. He is granted to stay in the grand mansion of an aristocratic family. He works at the Mohini Sindoor factory run by Subinay Babu (Pahari Sanyal), a dedicated member of the Brahmo Samaj. Subinay Babu's daughter Jaba (Anubha Gupta) is amused by Bhutnath whom she considers an unsophisticated rustic. Bhutnath becomes fascinated with the goings-on in the mansion and every night observes the decadent lifestyle of the Choudhury brothers.

One night the servant, Bansi (Kanu Banerjee), takes Bhutnath to meet the younger landlord's beautiful wife Pateshwari (Sumitra Devi) who implores him to bring her Mohini Sindoor believing it will keep her unfaithful husband home. Bhutnath is struck by her beauty and sadness and inadvertently becomes Pateshwari's secret confidante. A bomb explodes in the marketplace and Bhutnath is injured in the ensuing crossfire between freedom fighters and British soldiers. Jaba looks after him.

Pateshwari's repeated attempts to appease her husband fail until she becomes his drinking companion to keep him by her side. Jaba's marriage is finalised with Supavitra (a member of Bramho Samaj) but after her father's death she declined the marriage. Bhutnath becomes a trainee architect and goes away to work on a training project. After his return he find the mansion in partial ruins. Pateshwari is now a desperate alcoholic and her husband, paralysed. Meanwhile, he learns that he and Jaba were betrothed as children. One night Pateshwari asks Bhutnath to accompany her to a nearby shrine to pray for her ailing husband. Their plan to go to the shrine is informed to the elder landlord (Chhabi Biswas), who suspects that Pateshwari is having an affair with Bhutnath. He orders his henchmen to chase them. As Bhutnath and Pateshwari travel in the carriage, it is stopped by the henchmen. Bhuthnath is knocked unconscious and Pateshwari is abducted. When he wakes up in hospital, Bhutnath is informed that Pateshwari has disappeared and the younger landlord is dead. The flashback ends.

Bhutnath's workers inform him that a skeleton is found buried in the ruins of the mansion. From the bangles around the hand of the corpse, Bhutnath realises it is the remains of Pateshwari.

== Cast ==
- Uttam Kumar as Bhutnath
- Sumitra Devi as Choto Bou Rani
- Chhabi Biswas as Mejo Babu
- Nitish Mukherjee as Choto Babu
- Chhaya Devi as Boro Bou Rani
- Padma Devi as Mejo Bou Rani
- Pahari Sanyal as Subinay Babu
- Anubha Gupta as Jaba
- Jahar Ganguly
- Bhanu Banerjee
- Kanu Banerjee as Bongshi
- Haridhan Banerjee
- Nabadwip Haldar

== Soundtrack ==
Saheb Bibi Golam

Soundtrack album by Rabin Chatterjee
- Released: 1956
- Recorded: 1955
- Studio: Sarkar Production Pvt Ltd
- Length: 0:11:47
- Label: Angel Digital Pvt Ltd
- Producer: Khagendralal Chatterjee

Rabin Chatterjee chronology
Sagarika (1956)	Saheb Bibi Golam (1956)	Abhoyer Biye (1957)

The lyrics was written by Pranob Roy.

Songs
No.	Title	Playback	Length
1.	"Probhu Ami Je Tomar"	Alpana Banerjee	3:08
2.	"Jodi Oli Na Chahe"	Sandhya Mukherjee	2:08
3.	"Ke Tirandaaj"	Sandhya Mukherjee	1:59
4.	"Paniye Bharane"	Satinath Mukherjee	4:32
Total length:			11:47

== Reception ==
The film regarded as one of the greatest Bengali film ever made. Generally film become superhit. Uttam Kumar performance as Bhootnath was great acclaim by the critics. Famous actor Biswajeet Chatterjee inspired to his performance when he played Bhootnath role in Drama at Rangamancha theater. This film is considered as one of the best film ever made.

== Remakes ==
In 1962 the film was remade in Hindi as Sahib Biwi Aur Gulam by Guru Dutt (Producer and director) and he also played Bhootnath role while Meena Kumari and Waheeda Rehman also starred as Chhoti Bahu and Jabba role. It's remade again in Bengali in 2016 in same title starring Swastika Mukherjee, Anjan Dutta and Ritwik Chakraborty.
