= Achyut Potdar =

Indian Bollywood actor (1934–2025)

- Born: 22 August 1934; Jabalpur, Central Provinces and Berar, British India
- Died: 18 August 2025 (aged 90); Thane, Maharashtra, India
- Occupation: Actor
- Years active: 1980–2019
- Military career
- Allegiance: India
- Branch: Indian Army
- Service years: 1962–1967
- Rank: Captain
- Unit: Army Services Corps

Achyut Potdar (22 August 1934 – 18 August 2025), also known as Achyut, was an Indian actor who worked in over 125 Bollywood films. In addition to film, Potdar appeared in 95 serials, 26 plays and 45 ads.

== Early life and education ==
Potdar was born to a Marathi Brahmin family in Jabalpur, Central Provinces and Berar, British India, on 22 August 1934.

He spent his childhood in Indore, Madhya Pradesh and post graduated in 1961 with a major in economics.

== Career ==
After university, he became a professor at Rewa, Madhya Pradesh, and later joined the Indian Army from which he retired as a Captain in 1967. He later worked with Indian Oil as an executive for a period of nearly 25 years and retired at the age of 58 in 1992.

Potdar would participate in theatrical ventures and plays whilst working in Indian Oil and would host their cultural events.

Well known for his character roles in Bollywood, he entered this industry at the age of 44 years, coming from an army background and having spent years in the corporate world.

Potdar pursued acting as a serious hobby, he never went to ask for roles and did only those that came his way. He is almost a fixed character in Vidhu Vinod Chopra films.

His latest films include Dabangg 2, Ferrari Ki Sawaari and 3 Idiots. He also played a character in the serial Amita Ka Amit on Sony Entertainment Pvt. Ltd. Potdar also portrayed Jayaprakash Narayan on the television series Pradhanmantri and the character of Aaj Tak on Aandolan.

== Death ==
Potdar died on 18 August 2025, at the age of 90.

== Television ==
- Bharat Ek Khoj (Doordarshan)
- Pradhanmantri (ABP News)
- Shubh Mangal Savadhan (Sahara One)
- Aandolan (Aaj Tak)
- Amita Ka Amit
- All The Best (Doordarshan)
- Kya Hadsaa kya Haqeeqat (Kali Shakti)
- Mrs. Tendulkar (SAB TV)
- Pradhan Mantri (Zee TV)
- Agle Janam Mohe Bitiya Hi Kijo (Zee TV)
- Aahat Season 1 (1995–2001) (Sony TV)
- Wagle Ki Duniya
- Majha Hoshil Na (Zee Marathi)
- Yeh Duniya Ghazab Ki
- Maarshall

== Films ==
- 2019 Hausla
- 2014 Ekkees Toppon Ki Salaami
- 2013 R... Rajkumar as Pandit
- 2012 Dabangg 2 as Debi Prasad
- 2012 Ferrari Ki Sawaari
- 2009 3 Idiots as lecturer who taught machines
- 2009 Ek Tho Chance
- 2008 Karzzzz
- 2008 Bhoothnath
- 2006 Lage Raho Munna Bhai
- 2006 Teesri Aankh: The Hidden Camera
- 2005 Pehchaan: The Face of Truth
- 2005 Parineeta as Gurucharan, Vidya Balan's Father
- 2005 Vaada
- 2004 Ek Se Badhkar Ek as Advocate Nadkarni
- 2004 Dev
- 2004 Police Force: An Inside Story
- 2003 Qayamat: City Under Threat
- 2003 Yeh Dil
- 2003 Dhund: The Fog
- 2002 Rishtey
- 2002 Dil Hai Tumhaara
- 2002 Bharat Bhagya Vidhata
- 2001 Hum Ho Gaye Aapke
- 2001 Grahan
- 2001 Farz
- 2000 Aaghaaz
- 2000 Khauff
- 1999 Dahek – A Burning Passion
- 1999 Hum Saath-Saath Hain
- 1999 Gair
- 1999 Vaastav: The Reality
- 1999 Daag: The Fire
- 1999 Aa Ab Laut Chalen
- 1999 Nyaydaata
- 1998 Keemat – They Are Back
- 1998 Aakrosh: Cyclone of Anger
- 1998 Yugpurush
- 1998 Barsaat Ki Raat
- 1997 Ishq
- 1997 Udaan
- 1997 Insaaf
- 1997 Auzaar
- 1997 Yeshwant
- 1997 Shapath
- 1997 Sanam
- 1997 Mrityudand
- 1996 Shastra
- 1996 Bal Bramhachari
- 1996 Agni Sakshi
- 1996 Vijeta
- 1995 Rangeela as Mr. Joshi (Mili's father)
- 1995 Bollywood Dreams
- 1995 Gundaraj
- 1995 Andolan
- 1995 Surakshaa
- 1994 Droh Kaal
- 1994 Yeh Dillagi as Kajol's father
- 1994 Dilwale
- 1994 Elaan
- 1993 Shatranj
- 1993 Damini – Lightning
- 1993 Hasti
- 1993 Geetanjali
- 1993 Anth
- 1993 Aashiq Awara
- 1992 Angaar
- 1992 Chamatkar
- 1992 Humlaa
- 1992 Current
- 1992 Vansh
- 1992 Maarg
- 1992 Raju Ban Gaya Gentleman
- 1991 Shikari: The Hunter
- 1991 Prahaar: The Final Attack
- 1991 Narasimha
- 1990 Disha
- 1989 Parinda
- 1988 Tezaab
- 1988 Rihaee
- 1986 Mera Dharam
- 1985 Nasoor
- 1985 Aghaat
- 1984 Giddh
- 1983 Ardh Satya
- 1982 Vijeta
- 1981 Sazaye Maut
- 1980 Albert Pinto Ko Gussa Kyoon Aata Hai
- 1980 Aakrosh

== Awards and nominations ==
On 16 August 2015, Sanand, a cultural group in Indore, felicitated Achyut Potdar with Lifetime Achievement Award for his career, marking several decades, in Bollywood and remarkable contribution to the field of Art. He received Zee Marathi Jeevan Gaurav Puraskar in 2021 for playing the role of Appa in the television serial Majha Hoshil Na.

== See also ==
- List of Indian film actors
- List of people from Indore
