= Udaan (1997 film) =

- Directed by: Asrani
- Produced by: Lalit Kapoor; Raju Narula; Guddu Dhanoa
- Starring: Rekha; Saif Ali Khan; Madhoo
- Cinematography: Sripad Natu
- Edited by: A. Muthu
- Music by: Anand–Milind
- Production company: Amit Arts
- Release date: 3 October 1997
- Country: India
- Language: Hindi

Udaan (transl. Flight) is 1997 Hindi-language action film directed by Asrani and starring Rekha, Saif Ali Khan, Madhoo, in the lead roles, along with Prem Chopra, Dalip Tahil, Danny Denzongpa, Mohan Joshi as the antagonists. Saeed Jaffrey, Deven Verma, Mohnish Behl were in other important roles.

== Plot ==
A wealthy industrialist is killed by a villainous trio. The industrialist's daughter Varsha slowly starts to unravel the truth about her father's death, she is disposed of to an asylum. Varsha eventually escapes from there and sets out to bring the villain to justice, getting help along the way with a few inmates that escaped with her and from a young man named Raja, who she had attempted to help before being institutionalized. The film also deals with subjects like adulteration, corruption, and injustice in society.

== Cast ==
- Rekha as Varsha Sahay
- Saif Ali Khan as Raja
- Madhoo as Madhu
- Prem Chopra as Mr. Sood
- Dalip Tahil as Mr. Sethi
- Danny Denzongpa as Mr. Rana
- Mohan Joshi as Dr. Bhatia
- Saeed Jaffrey as Ramakant Sahay
- Deven Verma as Madhu's Uncle
- Mohnish Behl as Inspector Sharma
- Harish Patel as DSP Sahay
- Asrani as Baba Shree
- Annu Kapoor as Anand Lagpade
- Narendra Gupta as inmate of mental hospital
- Rana Jung Bahadur as inmate of mental hospital
- Lalit Mohan Tiwari as inmate of mental hospital
- Makrand Deshpande as Masoombhai Dayachand
- Achyut Potdar as Chandra Prakash

== Soundtrack ==
Song	Singer
"Chhat Ke Upar"	Shweta Shetty
"Chahun Tujhe"	Vinod Rathod, Bela Sulakhe
"Baadal Garja"	Kumar Sanu, Alka Yagnik
"Jab Jab Dekhun"	Kumar Sanu, Alka Yagnik
"Kal Raat Sapne"	Kumar Sanu, Alka Yagnik
"Angrezi Bhasha"	Abhijeet, Poornima

== Reception ==
Komal Nahta of Film Information wrote that "Udaan is devoid of an exciting drama and heroism", but noted Rekha's performance.
