= Nasoor =

- Directed by: Ashok Chopra
- Screenplay by: Ashok Chopra and Sandhya Divecha
- Story by: Mohan Kaul
- Produced by: BK Adarsh
- Starring: Om Puri; Priya Tendulkar; Sadashiv Amrapurkar
- Cinematography: Krishan Malhotra
- Edited by: Nandu Manjrekar
- Release date: 28 May 1985
- Country: India
- Language: Hindi

Nasoor (transl. Fistula, Ulcer, Sinus, or a Chronic discharging sore) is a 1985 Hindi drama film directed by Ashok Chopra with Om Puri, Priya Tendulkar, Sadashiv Amrapurkar, Reema Lagoo, Achyut Potdar, KK Raina and Arun Bakshi, among others, in lead roles.

== Plot ==
Dr. Sunil Gupta, a gynaecologist and Dr. Hira are partners in Prakash Nursing Home. Sunil treats his profession as an earning job unlike his father, who landed up in debt because of treating the poor patients for free. Sunil's girlfriend Yashoda Gore too, is a doctor working in a government hospital treating the profession as a service. A patient being treated by Dr Hira dies due to his negligence, but he saves his skin by firing the nurse. While operating on a minister's pregnant daughter-in-law, Manjula, Sunil is faced with a choice of saving either the mother or child. He opts for the former. The minister, Raosaheb, holds Sunil responsible for the child's death and lodges a complaint with the medical council. Dr Hira too sides with him against Sunil, getting him suspended. Sunil, in the meanwhile, discovers the truth of Hira's patient's death from the absconding nurse. Armed with the evidence, he files a case in the court and wins. Chastened Sunil decides to follow in his father's footsteps.

== Cast ==
- Om Puri as Dr. Sunil Gupta
- Priya Tendulkar as Dr. Yashoda Gore
- Sadashiv Amrapurkar as Raosaheb Mohite
- Achyut Potdar as Dr. Hira
- K. K. Raina as Kamlesh Pai
- Arun Bakshi as Dr. Babubhai
- Vijay Kashyap
- Kamini Bhatia
- Reema Lagoo as Manjula Mohite
- Shivraj as Deshpande
- Shashi Bala

== Reviews ==
Bobbytalkscinema gave a very positive review to the film and wrote "If you wish to see an honest film made on everything showcased in Aamir's famous serial's episode made on this disheartening issue (Evil and Unethical Practices by Doctors) then do watch "Nasoor" at the earliest. the film also needs to be seen if you want to experience what movies used to be in those good old days of "Meaningful Parallel Cinema" in our own Hindi Film Industry".
