= Vijeta (1996 film) =

- Directed by: K. Murali Mohana Rao
- Screenplay by: Santosh Saroj
- Produced by: Anil Rathi
- Starring: Sanjay Dutt, Raveena Tandon
- Cinematography: PS Prakash Rao
- Edited by: Narasimha Rao, Prashant-Vinod
- Music by: Anand-Milind
- Production company: Shree Ganesh Productions
- Release date: 26 January 1996
- Country: India
- Language: Hindi

Vijeta (transl. Winner) is a 1996 Bollywood action crime thriller film directed by K. Murali Mohana Rao and produced by Shree Ganesh Productions. Sanjay Dutt and Raveena Tandon played the lead roles with Paresh Rawal, Amrish Puri and Reema Lagoo in supporting characters. It was a remake of Telugu film Sathruvu (1990).

== Plot ==
Advocate Durga Prasad was to have received a file from Chote Thakur with regard to a case pending in a Court in Bangalore, India. However, Chote gets killed, he does not receive the file, and the Court's decision goes against him. Then he is approached by a former Government Employee, an Inquiry Officer, who claims that he was wrongly dismissed and framed by corrupt Government Officials. Durga Prasad, along with his juniors, Ashok, Ravi, and one other, decide to handle his case, however, before even the case could be filed, the Inquiry Officer is killed. An angered Durga is determined to take this matter to Court, but before that could happen, he and his wife, Laxmi, are killed in broad daylight right outside the Courthouse. His Junior, Ashok, promises to avenge their killings and sets about to locate their killers. He finds out that all of them work for Vidhya Sagar, and he goes about killing them one by one. Then the DIG of Police, Jagdish Chaudhary, assigns Police Inspector Vijayalaxmi to apprehend Ashok, not knowing that Vijaya and Ashok are in love with each other. She questions Ashok, but he provides her an alibi for each and every occurrence. But when the Mayor of Bangalore is killed, she catches Ashok red-handed, leaving open the question of whether Ashok will be ready to provide an alibi for this death or merely claim that he did not do it. The question remains, if Ashok did not kill the Mayor, then who did?

== Cast ==
- Sanjay Dutt as Advocate Ashok
- Raveena Tandon as Inspector Madam Anti Vijayalaxmi
- Paresh Rawal as Vidhya Sagar
- Reema Lagoo as Mrs. Laxmi D. Prasad
- Amrish Puri as D.I.G. Jagdish Chaudhary
- Alok Nath as Advocate Durga Prasad
- Annu Kapoor as Constable Chamanlal
- Rakesh Bedi as Constable Madanlal
- Dinesh Hingoo as Politics
- Dinesh Kaushik
- Raju Shrestha
- Deep Dhillon as Satyamurti, football coach
- Ananth Narayan Mahadevan as Inquiry Officer
- Shiva Rindani as Pratap Sharma
- Viju Khote as Vidhya Sagar's Lawyer
- Mahesh Anand as George
- Mac Mohan as Fernandes
- Javed Haider as Chintu
- Achyut Potdar as Chintu's Grandfather
- Ajit Vachani as Thapar
- Arun Bakshi as Trade Union Leader
- Asrani as Lallan, landLord's Wife
- Guddi Maruti as Rani, Lallan's Wife

== Soundtrack ==
1. "Ghunghat Mein Mukhde Ko" - Udit Narayan, Alka Yagnik
2. "Ghunghat Mein Mukhde Ko v2" - Bela Sulakhe
3. "Khwabo Mein Aanewali" - Vinod Rathod, Alka Yagnik
4. "Mujhko Ek Pappi Chahiye" - Abhijeet Bhattacharya, Poornima (Not in the film)
5. "Neend Aati Nahin" - Abhijeet Bhattacharya, Poornima
6. "Sherie Main Ho Gaya Deewana" - Abhijeet Bhattacharya, Kavita Krishnamurthy
