= Idiot (1992 film) =

- Based on: The Idiot by Fyodor Dostoevsky
- Written by: Anup Singh; Hemendra Bhatia; Rajeev Kumar
- Directed by: Mani Kaul
- Starring: Shah Rukh Khan; Ayub Khan-Din
- Music by: Vikram Joglekar; D. Wood
- Country of origin: India
- Original language: Hindi

Production
- Cinematography: Piyush Shah
- Editor: Lalitha Krishna
- Running time: 165 minutes

Original release
- Release: 8 October 1992

Idiot is a 1992 Hindi drama film based on Fyodor Dostoevsky's 1869 novel The Idiot. It was directed by Mani Kaul and stars Shah Rukh Khan and Ayub Khan-Din. The film debuted at the New York Film Festival in October 1992. In this version of the tale, placed in contemporary Mumbai, Prince Miskin (Khan-Din) is a man whose epilepsy is mistaken for idiocy.

== Cast ==
- Shahrukh Khan as Pawan Raghurajan
- Ayub Khan Din as Prince Miskin
- Mita Vashisht
- Imam Khan

== Production and release ==
The film was first released as a four-part television mini-series on state-run Doordarshan channel in 1991, and despite it debuting at the New York Film Festival in October 1992, it was never commercially released. In 1993, it was not part of the 24th International Film Festival of India but was shown privately to some festival delegates. It was screened at the Mumbai Film Festival in October 2016 with the title "Ahamaq".

== Reception ==
According to The New York Times, "it turns a literary masterpiece into a numbing soap opera as incoherent as it is technically crude."

== Awards ==
- 1993 Filmfare Awards: Critics Award For Best Movie
