= Narendra Gupta (actor) =

Indian television actor

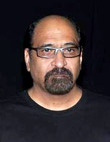
- Gupta in 2013
- Born: 21 July 1962 (age 64); Jaipur, Rajasthan, India
- Occupation: Actor
- Years active: 1988–present
- Known for: Dr. R. P. Salunkhe (C.I.D.)

Narendra Gupta is an Indian film and television actor who appears in Hindi television serials and films. He is best known for his role as forensic expert Dr. R. P. Salunkhe in the detective television series C.I.D..

== Early life ==
Gupta was born in Jaipur, Rajasthan, and was the youngest child of a business family. His father was originally from Uttar Pradesh, but migrated to Rajasthan. As a young student, he loved to study science and mathematics, though when he arrived in college, he started to read about arts and cinema. His mother's dream was for him to become a doctor. But he wanted to be an actor.

== Career ==
Gupta started his acting career with DD National's Wagle Ki Duniya in 1988. He joined the C.I.D. series in 1998. He made his debut in the episode "The Case of the Incomplete Letter", where he was initially referred to as Dr. Verma but started being referred to as Dr. Salunkhe from episode "The Case of the Burnt Letter". He gained popularity by playing the role of forensic expert Dr. R. P. Salunkhe in this series.

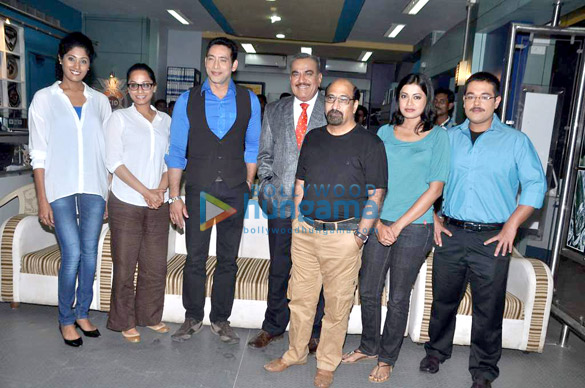
Narendra Gupta with co-actors of C.I.D. (from left–Shraddha Musale, Ansha Sayed, Hrishikesh Pandey, Shivaji Satam, Narendra Gupta, Janvi Chheda and Ajay Nagrath)

In 2014, Narendra Gupta appeared in Kaun Banega Crorepati with Shivaji Satam, Aditya Srivastava and Dayanand Shetty.

Gupta has acted in many popular television serials and films including Elaan (1994), Hulchul (1995), Udaan (1997), Police Force (2004), Forensic (2022).

== Filmography ==
=== Films ===
Year	Film	Role
1991	Maut Ki Sazaa	
1993	Karamati Coat	Lala
1994	Elaan	Conspirator to make Ramakant Chaudhary as a mental patient
1994	Anth	Telephone booth owner
1995	Hulchul	Bhandari Shobhraj's Secretary
1996	Aadhe Adhure	
1996	Tu Chor Main Sipahi	Chhota Khan
1996	Shastra	
1997	Udaan	Inmate of a mental hospital
2001	Boond	
2004	School	
2004	Kadvi Dava	Chaubey
2004	Police Force	Saxena
2005	Dhamkee	Rameshwar Pillai aka Ramya
2010	Tum Milo Toh Sahi	Store Manager
2018	Banoffee Pie	Man 1
2022	Forensic	Dr. Solanki

=== Television ===
Year	Show	Role	Notes
1988	Wagle Ki Duniya	Inspector Tyagi	
1989	Bharat Ek Khoj	Digha	
1997	Byomkesh Bakshi	Ravi Verma	
1997	Aahat	Lawyer	Episode 106 & 107 (Shakti)
1998	Rishtey		
2002	Piya Ka Ghar	Durgashankar Sharma	
2005	Saat Phere... Saloni Ka Safar	Aapji	
2007	Mano Ya Na Mano	Jewellery Shop Proprietor, Mr. Pandey	2 episodes
2008	Saath Saath Banayenge Ek Aashiyaan	Banwari	
2013	C.I.D. Chhote Heroes	Dr. R. P. Salunkhe	
2014	Kaun Banega Crorepati (Season 8)	Himself	Guest appearance
2012–2014	Adaalat	Dr. R. P. Salunkhe	2 episodes
2016	The Kapil Sharma Show	Himself	Guest appearance
2016	SuperCops Vs Super Villains	Harshwardhan	
1998–2003; 2005; 2007-2018; 2024–2025	C.I.D.	Dr. R. P. Salunkhe	
2019	CIF	Dr. D'Souza	
2021	Mauka-E-Vardaat	Newton Chattopadhyay	
2023	Mauka Ya Dhokha	Mr. Chawla	
