= Police Force: An Inside Story =

Police Force
- Directed by: Dilip Shukla
- Written by: Dilip Shukla
- Starring: Akshay Kumar; Raveena Tandon; Amrish Puri; Mohan Joshi; Alok Nath; Raj Babbar
- Music by: Anand–Milind; Satish-Ajay
- Release date: 28 May 2004
- Country: India
- Language: Hindi
- Budget: ₹5.5 crore
- Box office: ₹1.8 crore

Police Force is a 2004 Indian Hindi-language action film directed by Dilip Shukla, starring Akshay Kumar, Raveena Tandon and Amrish Puri.

== Plot ==
Police Academy trainer, Pandey, has been assigned to train some new recruits who are likely candidates for senior positions in India's Police Force. He does his best to train them, and get them assigned to their duties. What he is unable to teach them is about dishonest police officers, especially high-ranking ones; equally dishonest politicians, who have open links with gangsters and terrorists. These young men must now decide to carry on and compromise with this situation or become rebels and ultimately lose their jobs.

== Cast ==
- Akshay Kumar as Vijay Singh
- Raveena Tandon as Roma
- Amrish Puri as Training Officer Pandey
- Mohan Joshi as Pratap Bhosle
- Govind Namdeo as Dada Bhai
- Aloknath as Police Commissioner Chaudhary
- S. M. Zaheer as Mr. Singh
- Raj Babbar as Raatan Sethi
- Ashalata Wabgaonkar as Revati Singh
- Achyut Potdar as Bade Babu
- Payal Rohatgi Item Song
- Rami Reddy as Kutty Baba
- Vinay Apte as union leader Sawant
- Jaspal Sandhu as Baburao (Raatan Sethi's assistant)
- Deepraj Rana as Rana, batchmate and colleague of Vijay Singh in the Police Academy
- Ganesh Yadav as Batchmate and Colleague of Vijay Singh (cameo)
- Narendra Gupta as Saxena
- Ghanashyam Nayak as Public Spectator
- Santosh Gupta as Shanti Kumar, journalist (special appearance)

== Soundtrack ==
With the exception of the song "Aahi Re Mai", which was composed by Satish-Ajay, The soundtrack of Police Force was composed by Anand–Milind, with lyrics penned by Sameer. The film has 6 original songs. The soundtrack was released on 1 December 2003 by Saregama.

=== Track list ===
#	Song	Singer(s)	Length
1	"Rafta Rafta"	Sonu Nigam, Alka Yagnik	4:44
2	"Dil Churaya"	Abhijeet, Alka Yagnik	5:36
3	"Chehre Mein"	Sonu Nigam, Sadhana Sargam	4:38
4	"Maina Kunwari"	Vinod Rathod, Poornima	6:08
5	"Chudiyaan"	Richa Sharma	4:53
6	"Maina Kunwari - 2"	Vinod Rathod, Poornima	6:08
7	"Aahi Re Mai"	Shreya Ghoshal	6:12

== Critical response ==
Taran Adarsh of Bollywood Hungama gave the film 1 star out of 5, writing "None of the performances really stand out. Akshay goes through his role without much of an effort. His stunts are well executed of course. Raveena looks least interested in the goings-on. Amrish Puri gives a good account of himself. Raj Babbar tends to go over the top. Mohan Joshi is as usual. On the whole, POLICE FORCE has nothing forceful about it. Dull.
