= Elaan (1994 film) =

- Directed by: Guddu Dhanoa
- Written by: Dilip Shukla
- Produced by: Raju Narula; Lalit Kapoor
- Starring: Akshay Kumar; Madhoo; Amrish Puri
- Cinematography: Sripad Natu
- Edited by: A. Muthu
- Music by: Shyam-Surender
- Production company: Tridev Arts
- Distributed by: Shemaroo Entertainment
- Release date: 21 January 1994
- Running time: 140 minutes
- Country: India
- Language: Hindi
- Budget: ₹1.85 crore
- Box office: ₹8.66 crore

Elaan is a 1994 Indian Hindi-language action film directed by Guddu Dhanoa. It stars Akshay Kumar, Madhoo, and Amrish Puri in pivotal roles. Other cast members include Farida Jalal, Deven Verma, Mohnish Behl, Dalip Tahil, Mohan Joshi, and Rami Reddy. Released on 21 January 1994, the film was a commercially blockbuster.

== Plot ==
The story revolves around an upright and principled Police Officer, A.C.P. Ramakant Chaudhary, whose eldest son Vikas is killed in a pre-planned accident. But the A.C.P. is unable to nab the culprits for want of valid evidence. Consequently, the A.C.P., his wife Revati, and younger son Vishal are grief-stricken over the loss of young Vikas. While the atmosphere in the city is already vitiated by the atrocities of gang lords Baba Khan and Manna Shetty, who enjoy the support of some unscrupulous police personnel, the A.C.P. vows to make the ruthless gangsters bite the dust, without taking the law into his own hands. On the other hand, Vishal, an angry young man, cannot stand this injustice since the police had failed to arrest his brother's killers, and he silently resents his A.C.P father's inaction in dealing with the culprits. The ideologies of the father and son clash – which leads to a conflict between a dutiful father and a reckless son. The only one who understands the agony of Vishal is Mohini, the daughter of head constable Devkinandan Sharma. The day comes when Vishal confronts Baba Khan and Manna Shetty, which leads to tension and a gory situation for the A.C.P., as the gang lords threaten to eliminate the A.C.P. as well as his wife Revati and son Vishal.

== Cast ==
- Akshay Kumar as Vishal Chaudhary
- Madhoo as Mohini Sharma
- Amrish Puri as ACP Ramakant Chaudhary
- Farida Jalal as Revati Chaudhary
- Deven Verma as Head Constable Devkinandan Sharma
- Mohnish Behl as Inspector Vijay Sharma
- Dalip Tahil as Police Commissioner Desai
- Mohan Joshi as Baba Khan
- Rami Reddy as Manna Shetty
- Sulabha Arya as Parvati Sharma
- Achyut Potdar as Public Prosecutor
- Lalit Tiwari as Doctor Deepak
- Narendra Gupta as Man trying to frame Ramakant Chaudhary

== Soundtrack ==
#	Song	Singer
1.	"Naino Ko Baaten Karne Do"	Lata Mangeshkar, Kumar Sanu
2.	"Turu Ru Turu Ru"	Kumar Sanu, Poornima
3.	"Mil Ke Tumhari"	Kumar Sanu, Sadhana Sargam
4.	"Subah Huyee Shaam Huyee"	Kumar Sanu, Sadhana Sargam
5.	"Mera Dil Bola"	Poornima
6.	"Pehle Mere Aankhon"	Vinod Rathod, Sadhana Sargam
7.	"Lal Lal Gaal"	Kumar Sanu
