= Gair (film) =

1999 Indian film by Ashok Gaikwad

- Poster
- Directed by: Ashok Gaikwad
- Written by: Santosh Saroj (dialogues)
- Story by: Rajeev Kaul, Praful Parekh
- Produced by: Harish Sapkale, Prakash Patil
- Starring: Ajay Devgn; Raveena Tandon; Reena Roy; Amrish Puri; Paresh Rawal
- Cinematography: Anwar Siraj
- Edited by: Waman Bhonsle, Gurudutt Shirali
- Music by: Anand Milind
- Production company: Prakash Chitralaya
- Distributed by: Shemaroo Entertainment
- Release date: 7 November 1999
- Running time: 145 minutes
- Country: India
- Language: Hindi
- Budget: 3.50 cr
- Box office: 5.81 cr

Gair is a 1999 Indian Hindi-language action film starring Ajay Devgn, Raveena Tandon, Reena Roy, Amrish Puri and Paresh Rawal, directed by Ashok Gaikwad.

== Plot summary ==
A child left on the steps of a temple is adopted by a rich man. The child grows up to be rich and successful and generates hatred and envy by others.

Vijay (Ajay Devgan) an illegitimate orphan grows up to be a rich industrialist with his hard work. He falls in love with Madhu (Raveena Tandon) who is retired judge Amarnath's (Satyen Kapoor) only daughter. Their love blossoms. Raja (Ajinkya Deo) who is industrialist Oberoi's (Amrish Puri) son too falls for Madhu, but when Oberoi goes to ask for Madhu's hand he finds out that before him Vijay had approached for Madhu's hand. Oberoi sides Vijay's proposal, in fact Mr. Oberoi always best owed his special liking towards Vijay. He even treated him as his own son. This became the reason of conflict between his wife Sharda (Reena Roy), his brother-in-law (Paresh Rawal), and his son Raja. Vijay was even accused to be the illegitimate son of Mr. Oberoi. Jagat Poisoned Amarnath's mind about getting his daughter married to a bastard. The love of Vijay and Madhu was shattered but Vijay fights for his love.

== Cast ==
- Ajay Devgn as(dual role)
  - Vijay Kumar; Dev and Sharda's son;C.K.'s stepson; Raja's stepbrother; Madhu 's husband; An Angry Young Man
  - Dev; Vijay Kumar's Father and Sharda Oberoi's Boyfriend
- Raveena Tondon as Madhu, Vijay Kumar's wife
- Amrish Puri as C.K. Oberoi, Vijay Kumar's Step Father
- Reena Roy as Sharda Oberoi a.k.a. Mrs Oberoi, Vijay Kumar's Mother and C.K. Oberoi's wife
- Paresh Rawal as Jagat mama, Sharda Oberoi's elder brother
- Kiran Kumar as Union Leader Sampat
- Ajinkya Deo as Raja Oberoi, son of C.K.Oberoi; Vijay Kumar 's stepbrother; Madhu's one-side lover
- Satyen Kappu Retired Judge Amarnath
- Sulabha Deshpande as Kaushalya, Vijay Kumar's Mausi
- Guddi Maruti as Anita Keswani aka Anu, Madhu's Friend
- Rajesh Puri as Vijay Kumar's Manager
- Achyut Potdar as Jagat Mama's Friend
- Saleem Khan Ding Dong as Yokohama
- Khosrow Khalegpanah as College Goon

== Soundtrack ==
The soundtrack on Audio Cassettes was released in 1995 with its earlier name 'Shaktishaali'. But then CDs were released again at the time of film's release with updated title 'Gair'. This album is composed by Anand-Milind, Lyrics by Sameer.

#	Title	Singer(s)	Length
1.	"Akhon Main Mohabbat"	Kumar Sanu, Poornima	05:09
2.	"Aaj Ki Raat Naya"	Kumar Sanu, Alka Yagnik	05:33
3.	"Mere Dil Ne Chupke"	Kumar Sanu, Kavita Krishnamurthy	05:38
4.	"Laila Laila Mai Naye"	Abhijeet, Sapna Mukherjee	05:47
5.	"Mera Dil Meri Jaan"	Udit Narayan, Sadhana Sargam	04:48
6.	"Tu Aaja Meri Bahon"	Kumar Sanu, Alka Yagnik	05:15
