= Sadashiv Amrapurkar =

Indian actor (1950–2014)

- Monochrome portrait of Amrapurkar
- Born: Sadashiv Dattatray Amrapurkar; 11 May 1950; Ahilyanagar (Ahmednagar), Bombay State, India
- Died: 3 November 2014 (aged 64); Mumbai, Maharashtra, India
- Occupations: Actor
- Years active: 1979–2014
- Spouse: Sunanda Amrapurkar (m. 1973)
- Awards: Filmfare Awards for Best Supporting Actor in Ardh Satya (1983); Best Villain for Sadak (1991)

Signature
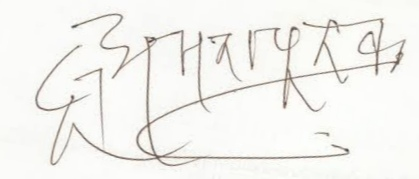

Sadashiv Dattatray Amrapurkar (11 May 1950 – 3 November 2014) was an Indian actor, best known for his performances in Marathi and Hindi films from 1983 to 2013. He acted in more than 300 movies in Hindi, Marathi, and other regional languages.

He received the Filmfare Award for Best Performance in a Negative Role in 1991 for Sadak — the first time the award was instituted. In 1993, he won the Filmfare Award for best actor in a villainous role, when the award was instituted. In 1993, Amrapurkar also played a comic hero, Inspector Pyare Mohan, in Aankhen. In addition to negative roles, he played supporting roles and later, comic roles.Amrapurkar played a negative role against Dharmendra in Anil Sharma's first successful film Hukumat in 1987.

== Early life ==
Amarapurkar was born on 11 May 1950, in Ahilyanagar (Ahmednagar) in Maharashtra in a well to do family. His father was a businessman and social worker in Ahmednagar. His younger brother Nilkanth Amarapurkar is a businessman in the city today.

Amrapurkar began acting during his school days. While completing his master's degree in history at Pune University, he was involved in theatre.

== Career ==
Amrapurkar started his career as an actor in Marathi theatre, eventually acting and directing nearly fifty plays, before transitioning to films. He made his film debut with the role of Bal Gangadhar Tilak in 22 June 1897, a Marathi historical film directed by Jayoo Patwardhan and Nachiket Patwardhan.

He won a number of awards in theatre and film. His first Hindi film was Govind Nihalani's Ardh Satya (1983), for which he won a Filmfare Award. He has acted in more than 300 movies in Hindi, Marathi, Bengali, Oriya, Haryanvi, Telugu and Tamil. In 1993, he won the Filmfare Award for Best Actor in a villainous role, the first time this award was instituted.

In 1981–82, Amarapurkar acted in a Marathi stage play, Hands-Up!, alongside stage actors Avinash Masurekar and Bhakti Barve-Inamdar. This play was successful and Amrapurkar was noticed by director Govind Nihalani, who was searching for an actor to play the central negative character in his movie Ardh Satya. The movie went on to be a hit and Amrapurkar's acting was appreciated. His style of dialogue delivery was considered unique as compared to the popular Hindi movie villains in those days. Amrapurkar won a Filmfare Award for his performance in the film.

After Ardh Satya, Amarapurkar starred in Purana Mandir, Nasoor, Muddat, Jawaani and Khamosh. In 1986, he starred as the villain in the Amitabh Bachchan-starrer Aakhree Raasta. In 1987, he starred as the main villain in the Dharmendra-starrer Hukumat, which went on to be a blockbuster that grossed even more than Mr. India. From 1988 he increasingly appeared in villainous roles in films such as Mohre, Khatron Ke Khiladi (1988 film), Kaal Chakra, Eeshwar, Elaan-E-Jung, Farishtay, Veeru Dada, Naaka Bandi and Begunaah.

In the mid-1990s he migrated towards supporting roles and comic roles such as in Aankhen, Ishq, Coolie No. 1, Gupt: The Hidden Truth, Aunty No. 1, Jai Hind, Master and Hum Saath-Saath Hain: We Stand United. He played the role of Dr. Khanna in the 1996 film Chhote Sarkar. He did a number of stunning roles in Marathi films such as Kadachit, Vaastupurush, Doghi, Savarkhed ek Gaav and Ara Ara Aaba Ata tari Thamba. His last Hindi screen role was a cameo in the short film by Dibakar Banerjee, Bombay Talkies (2012).

He did a cameo in the Waheeda Rehman-starrer Swayam in 1991. He played the role of a tough, upright cop who reprimands his children for leaving an elderly widow to fend for herself on the streets. The film touched on the problems old people face with the breakdown of the joint family system. It was a subject close to Amrapurkar's heart and he did the role for free.

Amrapurkar was a philanthropist, and social activist, and was engaged in a number of social organizations such as Samajik Krutadnyata Nidhi, Andhashraddha Nirmulan Samiti, Snehalaya, Lokshahi Prabodhan Vyaspeeth, Ahmednagar Aitihasik Vastu Sangrahalaya, and many others. He always had a soft spot for the rural youth and strove for their development.

In March 2013, he protested water waste during the Holi festival near his residence in Mumbai.

Amrapurkar also lent his support to the Anna Hazare movement in 2011 and was active in engaging citizens during the 2009 Lok Sabha elections by holding several discussions to make voters aware of their rights.

== Philanthropy ==
He was a philanthropist, social activist, and civically engaged in a number of social organizations including:

- Maharashtra Samajik Krutadnyata Nidhi: He worked with Narendra Dabholkar, Baba Adhav, and Shreeram Lagoo to raise Rs.50 Lakhs through the enactment of the play Lagnachi Bedi in Maharashtra and Goa. This was a fund created to support the social workers who toiled for the betterment of society without asking for anything in return.
- Andhashraddha Nirmulan Samiti: He was a trustee and an active participant in the Committee for Eradication of Blind Faith.
- Snehalaya, Ahmednagar: He was a trustee for this organization striving for betterment of marginalized women such as prostitutes and their children affected by HIV/AIDS.
- Narmada Bachao Andolan: He worked alongside Medha Patkar for the re-establishment of people displaced by the building of the Sardar Sarovar Dam on the banks of the river Narmada.
- Lokshahi Prabodhan Vyaspeeth: A non-political, non-denominational platform to create awareness about voter rights and democracy among the common masses. He held talks and forums to create awareness.
- Ahmednagar Aitihasik Vastu Sangrahalaya He raised funds for the Museum of Historical Artifacts of Ahmednagar,
- He supported non-profit organizations including the Institute for Psychological Health, Thane; Muktangan Rehabilitation Center, and Pune, through fundraising and mental health awareness.
- He collaborated with the Institute for Psychological Health in Thane to organize VEDH (Vocational Education – Direction and Harmony), a conference for school children, parents and teachers about the latest career options in Ahmednagar, once a year, for a decade.
- An ardent reader and a patron of Marathi and Hindi books, he wrote a number of articles on social issues in newspapers and magazines and published books, like Kimayagaar (a play about the life of Helen Keller) and Abhinayaache Saha Path ("Six Lessons in Acting").

After his death, Ahmednagar's Think Global Foundation started giving the 'Late Sadashiv Amarapurkar Award', in his memory, which became very popular in a short span. Kiran Kale, president of Think Global Foundation conceptualized this initiative. In 2016, the Marathi writer and IT expert Achyut Godbole and social worker and writer Deepa Deshmukh were honored with this award. In 2017, the playback singer Suresh Wadkar was honored with this award by the auspicious hands of the veteran actor Vikram Gokhale.

== Illness and death ==
Amrapurkar developed a lung inflammation in October 2014, which resulted in hospitalisation at Mumbai's Kokilaben Dhirubhai Ambani Hospital, where his condition became critical. He died on 3 November 2014, at the age of 64.

== Filmfare Awards ==
- 1984: Won - Best Supporting Actor for Ardh Satya
- 1991: Won - Best Villain for Sadak
- 1998: Nominated - Best Villain for Ishq

== Works ==
Selected plays he directed and acted in:

- Pai, Pai an Pai (one-act play, director, actor)
- Bandu, Baby ani Burkha (one-act play, director, actor)
- Jawai Maza Bhala (one-act play, director, actor)
- Bhatala dili Osri (actor)
- Kaka Kishacha (actor)
- Karaila gelo Ek (actor)
- Brahmacha Bhopla (actor)
- Kahi Swapna Vikaichi Aahet (actor, director)
- Yatrik (director, actor)
- Hawa Andhara Kavadsa (actor, director)
- Chhinna (director, actor)
- Chhoo Mantar (actor, director)
- Vitthala (director)
- Me Kumar (director)
- Suryachi Pillay (actor)
- Hands Up (actor)
- Kanyadaan (actor, director)
- Nishpap (director)
- Lagnachi Bedi (actor)
- Akasmat (director, actor)
- Ti Phulrani (actor)
- Jyacha Tyacha Vithoba (director, actor)

He directed some well-known artists like Shanta Jog, Smita Patil, Shreeram Lagoo, Bhakti Barve, Dilip Prabhavalkar, Neena Kulkarni, and Suhas Joshi.

Selected TV series

- Raj Se Swaraj (1989) Lokmanya Tilak
- Bharat Ek Khoj (1990) (Shyam Benegal's work based on the discovery of India) Mahatma Phule
- Kulvadhu (2009) Marathi serial
- Shobha Somnath Ki (2012)

Playback singer

- Hou De Jarasa Ushir (2013)
- Agnikaal (1990)

Books written by him 1. Kimayaagaar (play based on the life of Helen Keller) 2. Abhinayache Saha Paath

== Selected filmography ==
Film roles of Sadashiv Amrapurkar
Year	Title	Role	Notes
1979	22 June 1897	Bal Gangadhar Tilak	
1983	Ardh Satya	Rama Shetty	Won - Filmfare Award for Best Supporting Actor
1984	Jawaani	Joe	
1984	Maan Maryada	Bhawani Singh	
1984	Purana Mandir	Durjan, Watchman	
1985	Vivek		
1985	Sanjhi		
1985	Aghaat	V P Sarnaik	
1985	Nasoor	RaoSaheb Mohite	
1985	Teri Meherbaniyan	Sardari	
1985	Aar Paar		
1986	Khamosh	Chandran	
1986	Aakhree Raasta	Minister Chaturvedi	
1986	Muddat	Bharati Father	
1987	Mohre	Badrinath Chawla (Badri/Vasu Mudaliyar)	
1987	Hukumat	Mangal Singh, Deenbandhu Dinanath (DBDN)	
1987	Majaal	Driver Shyamu	
1987	Kaal Chakra	Police Inspector Waman Rao	
1988	Khatron Ke Khiladi	Balbir	
1988	Zulm Ko Jala Doonga	Police Inspector Mangesh Gandhi	
1988	Paap Ko Jalaa Kar Raakh Kar Doonga	Swami Parmanand	
1988	Maar Dhaad	Babulal/Dr. D'Cruz	
1988	Bijlee Aur Toofan		
1989	Nache Nagin Gali Gali		
1989	Dana Paani	Kutti	
1989	Sachché Ká Bol-Bálá	Police Inspector Nadkarni	
1989	Kasam Suhaag Ki	Inspector Sharma	
1989	Eeshwar	Tolaram	
1989	Kahan Hai Kanoon	Dharmatma	
1989	Asmaan Se Ooncha		
1989	Aakhri Baazi	Shaakal	
1989	Elaan-E-Jung	Durjan, Kaalia Naag	
1989	Gola Barood	Davar	
1989	Desh Ke Dushman	Rakka/Rakesh Verma	
1989	Lashkar	Inspector More	
1989	Apna Desh Paraye Log		
1990	Meri Lalkaar		
1990	Nakaa Bandi	Kaalia	
1990	Taqdeer Ka Tamasha	Sheshnaag	
1990	Dushman	Kaalicharan	
1990	Veeru Dada	Gul Anand	
1990	Doodh Ka Karz	Bhairav Singh	
1990	Agneekaal	Gulabchand Jhakotia	
1990	Awaragardi	Shakti Raj	
1990	Kaafila	Minister Thakur	
1991	Baat Hai Pyaar Ki	Gautam	
1991	Swayam		
1991	Begunaah	Rajan Dada	
1991	Farishtay	Raja Jaichand	
1991	Dushman Devta	Raja	
1991	Izzat	Thakur	
1991	Inspector Dhanush	Nageshswar Chaudhary/Rao	
1991	Hafta Bandh	Firangi Paisewala	
1991	Shiv Ram	Baburao Bheja	
1991	Indrajeet	DSP ShyamSunder	
1991	Rupaye Dus Karod	Lawyer Jamuna Das	
1991	Swarg Jaisaa Ghar	Sharmaji	
1991	Sadak	Maharani	Won - Filmfare Award for Best Villain
1992	Basanti Tangewali		
1992	Jai Kaali	Mukadam Summba	
1992	Police Officer	Badri Prasad	
1992	Kisme Kitna hai Dum	Thakur Bhanupratap Singh	
1992	Police Aur Mujrim	Dharampal	
1992	Sone Ki Lanka	Kamal Rai	
1992	Jeena Marna Tere Sang	MLA Dayanand Khurana	
1992	Yeh Raat Phir Na Aayegi	Thakur Jaswantkumar	
1992	Khule-Aam	Champaklal	
1992	Pyaar Ka Saudagar	Sadhuram	
1993	Bomb Blast	MLA Sada Khare	
1993	Aakanksha	Politician Nahar Singh	
1993	Aaj Kie Aurat	Home Minister Anna Patil	
1993	Aankhen	Inspector Pyaremohan	
1993	Hasti	Builder Narang	
1993	Andha Intequam	Police Inspector Shiva	
1993	Meherbaan	Chaurangilal	
1993	Khoon Ka Sindoor	Munna Kasai/C.B.I. Officer Sanjay Chauhan	
1993	Aag Ka Toofan		
1993	Hum Hain Kamaal Ke	Police Inspector Godbole	
1993	Kohra	Jakarto/CBI Office Neelkanth Sahai	
1993	Rani Aur Maharani	Police Constable Dildar Singh	
1993	Baarish		
1993	Anaam	Inspector Angre	
1993	Tadipaar	Maharani	Dream Sequence Special Appearance in beginning of film
1994	Do Fantoosh	Shetty	
1994	Pathreela Raasta	Ramakant Waghmare	
1994	Insaniyat	Deshpande	
1994	Janam Se Pehle	Judge Vishwanath Mahajan	
1994	Chauraha	Kalinath/Badrinath	
1994	Mohra	Police Commissioner Kamdev Kulkarni	
1994	Janta Ki Adalat	Minister Ranjit Khurana	
1994	Aag	Bholaram	
1994	Teesra Kaun	Police Inspector Aditya Talwar	
1995	Faisla Main Karungi	Inspector Shinde	
1995	Duniyaa Jhukti Hai	Judge/Underworld Don Ranjeet	
1995	The Don	Minister Parshuram	
1995	God and Gun	Satya Singh	
1995	Bewafa Sanam	John	
1995	Sabse Bada Khiladi	Amar Singh Choudhary	
1995	Coolie No. 1	Shaadiram Gharjode	
1995	Oh Darling Yeh Hai India	Bidder	
1995	Yaraana	Beggar Mungerilal	Special appearance
1995	Sanam Harjai	Advocate KK Verma	
1996	Hasina Aur Nagina	Thakur Bhanupratap	
1996	Aurat Aurat Aurat	Bijlee	
1996	Nirbhay		
1996	Jung	Chakradhari Choudhary	
1996	Angaara	Police Inspector	
1996	Return of Jewel Thief	Jukaso	
1996	Chhote Sarkar	Dr khanna	
1996	Ajay	Lala	
1997	Police Station	Thakur Shamsher Singh	
1997	Gupt: The Hidden Truth	Police Inspector Neelkanth	
1997	Do Ankhen Barah Hath	Viswanath Dayaram	
1997	Ek Phool Teen Kante	Kidnapper Bevda	
1997	Hasina Aur Nagina	Bhanupratap	
1997	Ishq	Ranjit Rai	Nominated - Filmfare Award for Best Villain
1997	Kaun Rokega Mujhe		
1998	Do Numbri	Hatela Hitler	
1998	2001: Do Hazaar Ek	Minister Ramaswamy	
1998	Aunty No. 1	Gopi Elder Brother	
1998	Mere Do Anmol Ratan	Mahesh	
1998	Mafia Raaj	Laturkar	
1999	Hai Kaun Woh	Police Inspector Hasmukh Sulje	
1999	Jai Hind	Sindhia	
1999	Kachche Dhaage	CBI Officer Jadeja	
1999	Jaanam Samjha Karo	Daniel	
1999	Trishakti	Police Inspector Dayal	
1999	Hum Saath-Saath Hain: We Stand United	Dharampal	
2000	Bulandi	Gora Father	
2000	Daku Ramkali	Bajrang	
2000	Hum To Mohabbat Karega	Inspector Shinde	
2000	Aakhir Kaun Thi Woh?	V P Sinha	
2000	Yeh Raat	Police commissioner	
2001	Officer	Lobo	
2001	Hum Ho Gaye Aapke	Manager	
2001	Dil Ne Phir Yaad Kiya	Mr Chopra	
2001	Kasam	Kala Daku	
2001	Jaan Pe Khelenge Hum	Police Inspector Bajrang Bihari	
2001	Rupa Rani Ramkali	Zamindar Rasikalal Rasia	
2001	Dal:The Gang	Gajrak Daruwala	
2002	Mawali No.1	Muthuswamy	Delayed, released in 2004
2002	Yeh Mohabbat Hai	Police Inspector	
2002	Tumko Na Bhool Paayenge	Chief Minister	
2002	Rishtey	Advocate Katre	
2003	Chori Chori	Chacha	
2003	Basti	Kanta	
2003	Tada	Dandekar	
2003	Parwana	Police Inspector Hardev Singh Haryanvi	
2003	Raja Bhaiya	Chaubey	
2004	AK-47	ACP Yograj Saxena	
2004	Taarzan: The Wonder Car	Anthony D'Çosta	
2004	Ek Se Badhkar Ek	Police Inspector Inamdar	
2005	Khullam Khulla Pyaar Karen	Supremo Trikaaal/ Anna	
2005	Koi Mere Dil Mein Hai	Iswarchand Mangatram Gore (I.M.Gore)	
2006	Aatma	Advocate Khurana	
2006	Siyaasat The Politics	Netaji	
2007	Dosh	Vijay Mehta/Kiran Bhatnagar	
2008	Tulsi	Annoying Foster Father	
2008	Mr. Black Mr. White	K.G	
2008	Rafoo Chakkar: Fun on the Run	Dilkhush	
2010	Bachao:Inside Bhoot Hai...		
2010	Khuda Kasam	Public Prosecutor	
2012	Sompa		Tulu-language film
2013	Bombay Talkies	Spirit of Sadashiv Amrapurkar	

=== Marathi films ===
Appearances by Sadashiv Amrapurkar in Marathi cinema
Year	Title	Role	Notes
1979	22 June 1897	Bal Gangadhar Tilak	
1985	Khichdi	Raghuvir Jagdale	
1988	Aai Pahije	Malhari	
1991	Z.P	Sadanand Waghmare	
1993	Janmathep	Parshuram Jadhav/Daku Parsha	
1995	Painjan	Shahir Pilajirao Khanjire	Dholki Mastero in Tamasha Folk
1996	Doghi	Uncle	
2000	Khatarnak	Advocate Raja Potbhare	
2002	Vaastupurush	Vadil	
2004	Savarkhed Ek Gaon	Sampatrao More	
2004	Zunj Ekaki	Sadabhau	
2005	Kunku Zaala Vairi	Tatyasaheb, Minister	
2007	Tahaan	Minister	
2008	Ara Ara Aaba Aata Tari Thamba	Aaba	
2008	Sakka Bhau Pakka Vairi	Mama	
2008	Kadachit		
2009	Gaav Tasa Changala	Sarpanch Popatrao	
2012	Hou De Jarasa Ushir	Fakir Baba	
