= Hasina Aur Nagina =

- Directed by: Gautam Bhatia
- Produced by: Gautam Bhatia
- Starring: Sadashiv Amrapurkar; Jagdeep; Kiran Kumar; Ekta Sohini
- Music by: Dilip Sen-Sameer Sen
- Release date: 1996
- Running time: 123 min
- Country: India
- Language: Hindi

Hasina Aur Nagina is a Bollywood film directed and produced by Gautam Bhatia. It was released in 1996 and stars Sadashiv Amrapurkar, Jagdeep, Kiran Kumar and Ekta Sohini.

== Plot ==
After the murder of the parents, two sisters became separated. Years later they meet and hunt for the murderers.

== Cast ==
- Ekta Sohini as Nagina
- Navneet Nishan as Hasina
- Jagdeep as Paplu
- Kiran Kumar as Nagraj
- Sadashiv Amrapurkar as Bhanu Pratap
- Arif Khan as Vikram
- Gina Shankar as Daku Maansingh
- Madhu Malhotra as Banjarin

== Music ==
1. "Tu Mera Raja Main Teri" – Sarika Kapoor, Simi Sinha
2. "Jay Shiv Shankar" – Sarika Kapoor
3. "Mai Hu Ek Hasina" – Kavita Krishnamurthy, Shobha Joshi
4. "Mai Tera Raja Tu Meri" – Sadhana Sargam, Nitin Mukesh
5. "Meri Shishe Wali" – Sadhana Sargam
6. "Mujhe Ishq Ka Rog" – Shobha Joshi, Mangal Singh
