= Muddat =

Muddat Move
- DVD Cover
- Directed by: K. Bapaiah
- Written by: Paruchuri Brothers; Kader Khan
- Based on: Chattamtho Poratam by Paruchuri Brothers
- Produced by: Firoz A. Nadiadwala
- Starring: Mithun Chakraborty; Jaya Prada; Padmini Kolhapure
- Cinematography: A. Venkat
- Edited by: V. R. Kotagiri
- Music by: Bappi Lahiri
- Production company: A. G. Films
- Distributed by: A. G. Films
- Release date: 20 June 1986
- Running time: 140 min.
- Country: India
- Language: Hindi
- Budget: ₹ 1.48 cr
- Box office: ₹ 15 cr

Muddat is a 1986 Indian Hindi-language thriller drama film directed by K. Bapaiah, starring Mithun Chakraborty, Jaya Prada, Padmini Kolhapure along with Kader Khan, Shakti Kapoor and Asrani. The film was a remake of Telugu film Chattamtho Poratam. It was the highest grossing Indian film of 1986 in worldwide box office.

== Plot ==
Bharti, a law student, lives with her widower and blind dad. Ravi Shankar Singh is a singer and dancer; Bharti is his fan and never misses his music concerts. One day Bharti is shocked to see Ravi being arrested by the police. She finds out that Ravi has confessed to the killing of a man, Rana Singh, and will soon be hanged. Bharti attends Ravi's last concert, but Ravi abducts her and forcibly marries her. After the marriage, Ravi is arrested and appears in court. It is revealed that Ravi and Bharti had conspired together to overturn Ravi's death penalty to life imprisonment, but the court is still not convinced and upholds Ravi's death penalty. Ravi's innocence or guilt is revealed in the climax.

== Cast ==
- Mithun Chakraborty as Ravi Shankar Singh
- Jaya Prada as Bharati Singh
- Padmini Kolhapure as Kalpana
- Sadashiv Amrapurkar as Bharati's Father
- Shakti Kapoor as Jailor Kripal Singh
- Kader Khan as Thakur Gajendra Singh
- Asrani as Heera
- Shreeram Lagoo as Vikram Singh
- Urmila Bhatt as Mrs. Vikram Singh
- Ashok Saraf as Narayan
- Rajesh Puri as Moti
- Satyendra Kapoor as Dayaram
- Vikas Anand as Police Inspector Mohan Nath
- Yunus Parvez as Police Inspector Saxena
- Goga Kapoor as Prosecuting Lawyer Randhir Ahuja
- Roopesh Kumar as Bhagwat Singh
- Manik Irani as Patthar

== Songs ==
Composed by Bappi Lahiri & Lyrics by Indeevar, the soundtrack album of the film was superhit at that time with popular songs like "Pyaar Humara Amar Rahega" & "Mujhe Kehte Hain Romeo".

Song	Singer
"Mujhe Kehte Hain Romeo"	Kishore Kumar
"Love Express"	Kishore Kumar, Asha Bhosle
"Pedon Ko Gaali Dene Do, Logon Ko Hansne Do"	Kishore Kumar, Asha Bhosle
"Pyar Hamara Amar Rahega, Yaad Karega Jahan"	Mohammed Aziz, Asha Bhosle
"Utho Jaago Chalo Bahenon"	Asha Bhosle

== Box Office ==
This movie collected ₹ 3.36 crore at the domestic box office and ₹ 15 crore at the global box office. Hence, it was declared a "Blockbuster".
