= Hemendra Bhatia =

Indian actor

Hemendra Bhatia was an Indian actor, writer, and acting coach.

== Early life ==
Bhatia was born in Kanpur in 1952. He was an alumnus of Film and Television Institute of India. He was an acting coach to prominent actors like Nawazuddin Siddiqui, Deepika Padukone and Anupam Kher. He joined the Bhartendu Natya Academy as a teacher and later served as the first dean of Anupam's acting school, Actor Prepares.

== Career ==
Hemendra appeared in the short The Eight Column Affair in 1987 and the film Karamati Coat or the miraculous coat in 1993. He acted in films like Maine Gandhi Ko Nahin Mara, Satta. He also appeared in the TV series Bharat Ek Khoj. He was also involved in writing of the screenplay of the 1992 film Idiot, starring Shah Rukh Khan. In 2020, he wrote and directed a stage play named Tum. He also served as a member of the jury in 52nd International Film Festival of India.

== Death ==
Bhatia died at the age of 70 in Mumbai, on 30 August 2022.
