= Satta (2003 film) =

- Film poster
- Directed by: Madhur Bhandarkar
- Written by: Madhur Bhandarkar; Manoj Tyagi
- Produced by: Metalight Productions Pvt Ltd.
- Starring: Raveena Tandon; Sameer Dharmadhikari; Atul Kulkarni; Vipin Sharma
- Cinematography: Madhu Rao
- Edited by: Deepak Wirkud
- Music by: Raju Singh
- Production company: Metalight Productions Pvt Ltd
- Release date: 7 February 2003
- Country: India
- Language: Hindi

Satta (transl. Power) is a 2003 Indian Hindi-language political drama film co-written and directed by Madhur Bhandarkar. It stars Raveena Tandon in the lead role, with Atul Kulkarni, Govind Namdev, and Sameer Dharmadhikari in supporting roles. The film narrates the story of a persecuted wife of a greedy politician who takes on his role after he lands up in jail because of murder charges. Satta received critical acclaim upon release and is considered one of the best performances of Raveena Tandon. The film was released on the same day as Khushi and Baaz.

== Plot ==
Anuradha Sehgal re-locates to Mumbai, finds employment, meets and weds Mumbai's aspiring Chief Minister, Vivek Chauhan. She soon finds out that Vivek is a womanizer and an alcoholic. She then faces physical abuse. Vivek is arrested for murder and is jailed. The Chauhan family persuades her to stand for elections in her husband's place, which she does. She then witnesses the nexus between the underworld, businessmen, corrupt policemen, and politicians.

== Cast ==
- Raveena Tandon as Anuradha Sehgal
- Sameer Dharmadhikari as Vivek Chauhan
- Atul Kulkarni as Yashwant Varde
- Govind Namdev as Liyaqat Ali Baig
- Anju Mahendru as Mrs. Sehgal
- Suchitra Pillai as Neelu
- Shrivallabh Vyas as Mahendra Chauhan
- Amardeep Jha as Mrs Chauhan
- Manoj Joshi as Uddhav Pawar
- Sunil Chauhan as Police Inspector
- Hemendra Bhatia as Anna Saheb Joshi.

== Songs ==
All songs were composed by Raju Singh, while the lyrics were penned by Javed Akhtar.

- "Gungunati Hai" - Sonu Nigam
- "Gungunati Hai" - Asha Bhosle
- "More Saiyan" - Asha Bhosle
- "Masti Masti" - Shankar Mahadevan
- "Jeevan Path" - Shubha Mudgal
- "Jab Dil Mile" - Shaan, Madhushree

== Reception ==
Satta opened to generally positive reviews. Deepa Gumaste of Rediff.com wrote, "Raveena Tandon has obviously landed the role of a lifetime and she makes the most of it. She portrays the firebrand Anuradha with the kind of passion you wouldn't have expected from the heroine who once danced to the tune of Tu cheez badi hai mast." Taran Adarsh in his review wrote: "Raveena Tandon delivers a bravura performance. The actress takes giant strides as a performer, giving the right touches to her character. Here's a performance that's bound to be noticed." Komal Nahta in a less favourable review wrote, "On the whole, Satta is a non-starter. Pretending to be an intellectual film, it would not even appeal to the intelligentsia because it offers nothing new."
