= Aunty No. 1 =

- Directed by: Kirti Kumar
- Screenplay by: Sachin Bhowmick
- Based on: Moru chi Maushi by Acharya Atre
- Produced by: Suresh Jethani
- Starring: Govinda; Raveena Tandon; Kader Khan; Harish Kumar
- Cinematography: S. M. Anwar
- Edited by: V. S. Mayekar
- Music by: Anand–Milind
- Dialogue by: Kader Khan
- Production company: Lata Films
- Release date: 1 May 1998
- Country: India
- Language: Hindi

Aunty No 1 is a 1998 Indian Hindi-language action comedy film directed by Kirti Kumar and written by Kader Khan and Sachin Bhowmik. It stars Govinda, Raveena Tandon, Harish Kumar and Kader Khan .

== Plot ==
Sandhya is in search of her prince charming and when Gopi realizes this he pretends to be a rich prince Ranjit Sehgal, so Sandhya dates him. Soon she discovers that Gopi is a poor man but nevertheless, they start loving each other. Meanwhile, Gopi's friends, Abhyankar and Raja, request Gopi to become an aunt for a big favour. He does so with hilarious results, as two men start loving him, leading to hilarious situations.

== Cast ==
- Govinda as Gopi (Kanaklakshmi / Ranjit Sehgal)
- Raveena Tandon as Sandhya
- Harish Kumar as Abhyankar
- Rohit Kumar as Raja
- Raza Murad as Ram Nath, Kamalnath (dual role)
- Reema Lagoo as Vijayalaxmi
- Kader Khan as Rai Bahadur Behl
- Guddi Maruti as Asha
- Satish Kaushik as Mr. Pareshan
- Anupam Kher as Jyotish
- Saeed Jaffrey as Col. Dogra
- Narender Singh Bedi as Sardarji on scooter
- Mohnish Behl as Gaurav
- Bindu as Gopi's sister-in-law
- Lilliput as Servant
- Sadashiv Amrapurkar as Gopi's elder brother
- Eva Grover as Usha
- Mitra Joshi as Nisha

== Box office ==
The film earned ₹10.5 crore at the domestic box office and was a semihit.

== Soundtrack ==
The music of this movie was composed by the duo Anand–Milind.

No.	Title	Singer(s)	Length
1.	"Kuchh Kuchh"	Udit Narayan, Alka Yagnik
2.	"Bulbula Re Bulbula"	Udit Narayan, Alka Yagnik
3.	"Chin China China"	Kumar Sanu, Udit Narayan, Sadhana Sargam, Poornima
4.	"Reshmi Rumaal Wala"	Vinod Rathod, Jyotsna, Sumati
5.	"Sonpapdi"	Alka Yagnik, Vinod Rathod
6.	"Aunty No. 1"	Arzoo Bano
