= Ek Hi Raasta (1993 film) =

1993 Indian film by Deepak Bahry

- Release poster
- Directed by: Deepak Bahry
- Written by: Lalit Mahajan; Sumeet Malhotra
- Produced by: Chander Sadanah
- Starring: Ajay Devgn; Raveena Tandon; Raza Murad; Saeed Jaffrey
- Cinematography: Damodar Naidu
- Edited by: Nazir Hakim
- Music by: Mahesh Kishor
- Distributed by: Tips Muvbsic Films
- Release date: 22 October 1993
- Country: India
- Language: Hindi

Ek Hi Raasta is a 1993 Indian Hindi-language action drama film. The film stars Ajay Devgn as an Indian army soldier and Raza Murad as a terrorist with aspirations to rule India. Directed by Deepak Bahry, the film also stars Raveena Tandon.

== Plot ==
A terrorist named Kubla wants to rule India. So, he works with army officer Vikram to steal army information for him. To get the information, Vikram kills another man and frames army soldier Karan Singh, who goes on the run. Kubla and Vikram then abduct Colonel Choudhry and his daughter Priya, threatening to harm them.

== Cast ==
- Ajay Devgn as Karan Singh
- Raveena Tandon as Priya Choudhry
- Raza Murad as Kubla
- Saeed Jaffrey as Colonel Choudhry
- Deven Verma as Mehra
- Kulbhushan Kharbanda as Bhagat Singh
- Mohnish Bahl as Vikram Singh
- Sharat Saxena as Army Officer Suraj Sachdev
- Arun Bakshi as Major Vijay Rathod

== Soundtrack ==
#	Title	Singer(s)	Lyric
1	"Meri Seeti Bas Gayee"	Kumar Sanu, Sadhana Sargam	Gulshan Bawra
2	"Kaliyon Ke Khilne Ka"	Udit Narayan, Bela Sulakhe	Rani Malik
3	"Aankh Mere Yaar Ki Dukhe"	Pankaj Udhas	Naqsh Layalpuri
4	"Tere Mere Pyar Ka"	Kumar Sanu, Bela Sulakhe	Kulwant Jani
5	"Yaar Ko Milne Jaana Hai"	Vinod Rathod	Dev Kohli
6	"Aankh Mere Yaar Ki Dukhe"	Pankaj Udhas, Kavita Krishnamurthy	Naqsh Layalpuri
7	"Pyar Ghazab Ki Cheez Hai"	Vipin Sachdeva	Dev Kohli
