= Divya Shakti =

1993 Indian film by Sameer Malkan

- Theatrical release poster
- Directed by: Sameer Malkan
- Written by: Sameer Malkan; Dilip Shukla
- Produced by: Dinesh Patel
- Starring: Ajay Devgan; Raveena Tandon
- Cinematography: Romesh Bhalla
- Edited by: Suresh Chaturvedi
- Music by: Nadeem-Shravan
- Distributed by: Sonu Films International
- Release date: 19 February 1993
- Running time: 180 min
- Country: India
- Language: Hindi

Divya Shakti (English: Divine Strength) is a 1993 Indian Hindi-language action film directed and written by Sameer Malkan. The film stars Ajay Devgan, Raveena Tandon in lead roles.

== Plot ==
Prashant Verma (Ajay Devgn) is a journalist and is in love with Priya (Raveena Tandon) He gets weary and tired of witnessing the reign of crime, police corruption and injustice in his city and decides to wage a one-man war against the psychotic king maker "Tau" (Amrish Puri). His journey costs him his limbs and loved ones as he goes on a vigilante style brute-fest right into the lair and dark world of the two-faced Tau and his cronies. Death and destruction follow the warpath.

== Cast ==
- Ajay Devgan as Prashant Verma
- Raveena Tandon as Priya
- Aloknath as Professor
- Shakti Kapoor as Bharat Acharya
- Amrish Puri as Tau
- Satyendra Kapoor as Monto
- Shafi Inamdar as ACP Anand Deshmukh
- Natasha Sinha as Shalini Verma
- Anjan Srivastav as Pandey
- Dinesh Hingoo as Rustam
- Pankaj Berry as Francis
- Deep Dhillon as Lalla
- Manohar Singh as Priya's Father
- Ragesh Asthana as Sunil Gupta only Photo in photo frame (uncredited)
- Abhimanyyu as Inspector
- Khosrow Khaleghpanah as imported the fighter

The music of the film was composed Nadeem-Shravan and the lyrics were penned by Sameer. The soundtrack was released in 1993.

#	Song	Singer
1.	"Bata Mujhko Sanam Mere"	Kumar Sanu, Alka Yagnik
2.	"Nahin Nahin Kabhi Nahin"	Kumar Sanu, Alka Yagnik
3.	"Sang Sang Chalunga Main" (Male)	Kumar Sanu
4.	"O Mere Gudde Raja"	Kumar Sanu, Asha Bhosle
5.	"Sang Sang Chalungi Main" (Female)	Sadhana Sargam
6.	"Aap Ko Dekh Kar"	Kumar Sanu, Alka Yagnik
7.	"Kare Kaise Ada Rabka"	Alka Yagnik
8.	"Aao Na Mujhse Pyar Karo"	Asha Bhosle
