= Jeena Marna Tere Sang =

Jeena Marna Tere Sang जीना मरना तेरे संग
- Promotional Poster
- Directed by: B. Vijay Reddy
- Written by: Shanmukha Sundaram
- Based on: Prema Parva (Kannada)(1983)
- Produced by: Gulshan Kumar
- Starring: Sanjay Dutt; Raveena Tandon
- Cinematography: Harmeet Singh
- Music by: Dilip Sen-Sameer Sen, Babul Bose
- Release date: 28 August 1992
- Country: India
- Language: Hindi

Jeena Marna Tere Sang (transl. live and die with you) is a 1992 Indian Hindi-language romantic action film directed by B. Vijay Reddy. It stars Sanjay Dutt and Raveena Tandon. The movie is a remake of 1983 Kannada film Prema Parva starring Murali and Bhavya. This Film Is Raveena's Only Release In 1992 .

== Cast ==
- Sanjay Dutt as Amar Khurana
- Raveena Tandon as Ashna (Asha)
- Javed Jaffrey as Vijay, Amar's college friend
- Sadashiv Amrapurkar as MLA Dayanand Khurana, Amar's father
- Reema Lagoo as Dr. Lakshmi Khurana, Amar's mother
- Paresh Rawal as Mantri Hiralal
- Alok Nath as Dinanath, Asha's father
- Aruna Irani as Kamla, Asha's stepmother
- Annu Kapoor as Pinto, Amar's college friend
- Asrani as Traffic Police Constable Sewakram (guest appearance)
- Viju Khote as Damodar, P.A. of College Principal
- Tej Sapru as Gulati, nephew of Kamla
- Tiku Talsania as Professor Chephutkar
- Guddi Maruti as Bela, Asha's college friend (guest appearance)
- Satyen Kappu as Dinu Kaka, Servant of Dayanand Khurana
- Chandrashekhar as College Principal Surinder Mehra
- Sonika Gill as Priya, Hiralal's daughter
- Roma Manek
- Aparajita Bhushan as Professor Shyamala

== Soundtrack ==
#	Title	Singer(s)	Lyricist(s)	Music director(s)
1	"Chaha Hai Tumhein Chahenge Saanson Mein Bas Jayeng"	Kumar Sanu, Anuradha Paudwal	Sameer Anjaan	Dilip Sen-Sameer Sen
2	"Kal Maine Khuli Aankh Se Ek Sapna Dekha"	Abhijeet, Anuradha Paudwal	Ibrahim Ashq	Dilip Sen-Sameer Sen
3	"Tumse Hai Kita Pyar Ye Hum Keh Nahin Sakte"	Vipin Sachdeva, Anuradha Paudwal	Dilip Tahir	Dilip Sen-Sameer Sen
4	"Aaj Dil Ki Baatein Keh Denge Hum Sabhi"	Babla Mehta, Anuradha Paudwal	Yogesh	Dilip Sen-Sameer Sen
5	"Tune Zamane Ye Kya Kar Diya"	Vipin Sachdeva, Anuradha Paudwal	Indeevar	Dilip Sen-Sameer Sen
6	"Kala Doriya"	Anuradha Paudwal	Mahendra Dehlvi	Dilip Sen-Sameer Sen
7	"Dil Mein Hai Kya"	Anuradha Paudwal, Hariharan	Sameer	Dilip Sen-Sameer Sen
8	"Dil Ek Mandir Pyar Hai Pooja"	Anuradha Paudwal	Ibrahim Ashq	Dilip Sen-Sameer Sen
9	"Ye Kya Hua"	Vipin Sachdeva, Anuradha Paudwal	Ibrahim Ashq	Dilip Sen-Sameer Sen
10	"Jo Sache Premi Hain"	Vipin Sachdeva, Anuradha Paudwal	Dilip Tahir	Dilip Sen-Sameer Sen
11	"Tere Liye Laya Hoom Main Lal Lal Chunariya"	Mohd Aziz, Anuradha Paudwal	Ravinder Rawal	Babul Bos
12	"Aa Tujhko Is Dil Mei Basa Loon"	Anuradha Paudwal, Babla Mehta	Sameer	Dilip Sen - Sameer Sen
13	"Jab Nazar Band Thi"	Anuradha Paudwal	Sameer	Dilip Sen - Sameer Sen
14	"Dil Ek Mandir Pyar Hai Pooja - Male"	Vipin Sachdeva	Ibrahim Ashq	Dilip Sen-Sameer Sen
