= Vinashak =

Vinashak - Destroyer
- Movie Poster
- Directed by: Ravi Dewan
- Written by: Rajkumar Santoshi
- Produced by: Xavier Marquis
- Starring: Sunil Shetty; Raveena Tandon; Danny Denzongpa
- Cinematography: Peter Pereira
- Edited by: Prashant Khedekar
- Music by: Viju Shah
- Release date: 30 January 1998
- Running time: 160 minutes
- Country: India
- Language: Hindi
- Budget: ₹ 6 crores
- Box office: ₹ 11 crores (India Net Collection)

Vinashak - Destroyer is a 1998 Indian Hindi-language action film directed by Ravi Dewan and produced by Xavier Marquis under the banner of Mark Films International. It stars Sunil Shetty, Raveena Tandon and Danny Denzongpa. The film netted domestically ₹11 crore (equivalent to ₹54 crore or US$5.8 million in 2026) against a production budget of ₹6 crore (equivalent to ₹29 crore or US$3.2 million in 2026).

The film is loosely based on the movies Death Warrant (1990) and Hard Justice (1995)

== Plot ==
Near Mumbai, in the Central Jail, Jailer Lankeshwar uses his jail as a trade centre for weapons and narcotics, with Ajgar, Lankeshwar's goon, hideously committing crimes despite a permanent death sentence. After one of the crimes committed by Ajgar, ACP Amar Agnihotri gets suspicious of Lankeshwar's actions. He even discovers his nature, getting determined further.

Police Inspector Arjun Singh is a brave, honest officer stationed in Khandala. He is a very strict police officer and uses harsh methods against all criminals. His colleague and friend is Inspector Khan, who always supports him. Arjun is in love with Kajal, who is the daughter of his senior police officer, ACP Amar Agnihotri. Arjun's father does not agree with the harsh ways he uses against the criminals, even though Arjun's sister had been a victim of drug addiction in the past, and without it, she is living in a depressed state.

ACP Amar requests the higher authorities to let Arjun go to jail and gather evidence about Lankeshwar's evil deeds. The plan is that Arjun will fire a blank bullet at ACP Amar. Arjun pleads guilty in court and is sentenced to jail. In jail, Arjun learns that arms, drugs and explosives are smuggled from the jail. He reports it secretly to the Home Minister and the New Police Commissioner through Constable Hariram. But the fact is that ACP Amar was really killed inside the ambulance, and Arjun is now trapped. Hariram is killed in jail, Arjun's sister is gang-raped, and his father is also killed by Ajgar.

Inspector Khan learns of Arjun's plight and decides to help him. He sneaks into the jail and breaks Arjun's chains. Arjun destroys the jail's office with the help of Khan. However, Khan is fatally shot by the police. Soon he approaches Kajal, who is furious with him for killing her father; however, after hearing the whole story and seeing Arjun's condition, she forgives him and decides to help him.

Arjun plans to take revenge systematically. He becomes a one-man army and kills many of Lankeshwar's henchmen. Lankeshwar, the Home Minister and the Police Commissioner are now in a panic as Arjun is on a killing spree. During the Home Minister's birthday, he and Kajal set up a trap for Lankeshwar and the remaining trio, but Kajal is trapped due to a blunder, leading her to suffer an injury from a gunshot, despite Arjun rescuing her. Arjun admits her to the hospital for treatment, and she somehow survives. With further preparations, Arjun kills the Police Commissioner, leading to the security arrangement going waste, and takes the Home Minister hostage, driving away to another area. He tells him to confess his misdeeds on a recorder at gunpoint and later kills him. After learning of this, Ajgar kidnaps General Store, the jail guard, to lure Arjun, but Arjun arrives in time to kill Ajgar by burning him alive.

In fright, Lankeshwar pleads guilty in court and is sentenced to be a prisoner in his own jail, thinking he will be safe there. But Arjun, sensing his motive, also pleads guilty and is imprisoned in the same jail. However, Lankeshwar, along with his fellow officers, decides to escape jail and cross the country border. When they escape, Arjun starts a killing spree. Lankeshwar and Arjun have a showdown in the jail. Arjun beats Lankeshwar as the prisoners begin to weave a noose, and then drags Lankeshwar to the gallows and hangs him by the noose, leading to the prisoners celebrating Arjun's victory. The film ends with Arjun, clad in a police uniform, saluting with Kajal and the Indian flag in the background, implying that he is acquitted.

== Cast ==
- Suniel Shetty as Arjun Singh
- Raveena Tandon as Kaajal
- Danny Denzongpa as Jailer Lankeshwar
- Alok Nath as Police Commissioner Rawat
- Tinnu Anand as Home Minister Deendayal
- Om Puri as Inspector Abdul Rehman Khan
- Mohan Joshi as A.C.P. Amar Agnihotri
- Mukesh Rishi as Bhairav Singh "Ajgar", Lankeshwar's henchman.
- Shivaji Satam as Hariram
- Satyen Kappu as Arjun's father
- Harish Patel as General Store, convict

== Soundtrack ==
Vinashak

Soundtrack album by Viju Shah
- Released: 1997
- Genre: Feature film soundtrack
- Label: Tips Music

#	Title	Singer(s)	Lyricist(s)
1	"Kho Diye"	Roop Kumar Rathod, Sadhana Sargam	Deepak Chaudhary
2	"Godhna Godh"	Poornima, Sudesh Bhosle	Kishore Shastri
3	"Rooba Rooba"	Kavita Krishnamurthy	Deepak Chaudhary
4	"Chal Chal"	Udit Narayan, Kavita Krishnamurthy	Deepak Chaudhary
5	"Vinashak"	Amit Kumar	Deepak Chaudhary
6	"Moriya Moriya	Udit Narayan, Sapna Mukherjee	Dinesh Parihaar
