= Maatr =

2017 Indian Hindi thriller film directed by Ashtar Sayed

- Theatrical release poster
- Directed by: Ashtar Sayed
- Story by: Michael Pellico
- Produced by: Michael Pellico
- Starring: Raveena Tandon; Sonali Pingale; Alisha Parveen; Madhur Mittal; Divya Jagdale; Anurag Arora; Rushad Rana; Saheem Khan; Shalee Goel
- Cinematography: Hari K. Vedantam
- Edited by: Manoj Magarr; Girish Verma
- Music by: Fuzön
- Production company: CDB Musical Production
- Release date: 21 April 2017
- Country: India
- Language: Hindi
- Budget: ₹210 million
- Box office: ₹939 million

Maatr (transl. Mother) is an Indian thriller film written by Michael Pellico and directed by Ashtar Sayed. Michael Pellico is the executive producer under the banner CDB Musical. It featured Raveena Tandon in the lead role alongside Madhur Mittal, Divya Jagdale, Shailendra Goel, Anurag Arora, Saheem Khan and Rushad Rana. The music was created and composed by the Pakistani Sufi rock band, Fuzön.

The film's principal photography commenced in March 2016. The film is shot in Delhi and Haryana. The film was released on 21 April 2017. It emerged as a commercial success.

== Plot ==
Vidya Chauhan is a schoolteacher living in Delhi with her husband, Ravi and her teenage daughter. Tia. One night she is returning home from a school event that is an annual function with her daughter when she decides to take a deserted route to avoid a huge traffic jam. During the traffic jam, Vidya calls her friend Ritu and starts telling her about the school function; while talking on the phone they meet with an accident caused by the Chief Minister's son and his friends while intending to kidnap a girl they saw at the annual function. Vidya and her daughter are kidnapped by the Chief Minister's son Apurva Malik and his friends even after they realize they had followed the wrong car, who take the women to a farmhouse and gang rape them before dumping their bodies on the roadside. Tia dies as a result of the sexual assault but Vidya survives. She names the CM's son and his friends as the attackers. However, those men use their influence to get away.

Vidya moves in with her friend Ritu after her husband leaves her. She decides to hunt down and punish her daughter's killers. First up is Sikander Beniwal. She loosens the screws on the tyres of his bike causing a severe accident that kills him. She notes down the numbers and names of his friends from his phone. She finds out that one of the men, Inder Jhangra has been abusing Meenal, one of her students and Tia's friend. She helps Meenal poison Inder when he tries to abuse her in a hotel room. The inspector on the case Akhil Sachdeva is starting to get suspicious of Vidya but has no proof. Apurva Malik and his friends have also become suspicious. They beat up Ravi to pressure Vidya to back off.

One night Ritu takes Vidya out for dinner. Vidya doesn't know that the restaurant is owned by Harshit Poojari, one of the rapists who attacked her. When Harshit sees her on the CCTV cameras, he calls Apurva who tells him to hold her. He also calls his other friends before following Vidya to the bathroom. In the ensuing scuffle, Vidya stabs him and manages to escape in a taxi. She is followed by Kamran Qureshi, Poojari's accomplice. Kamran rams his car into her taxi and shoots the driver before accidentally dropping his gun. Vidya grabs the gun and kills him before rushing home. Back home she tells Ritu the truth. Inspector Sachdeva comes to question her but leaves without getting anything out of her. Apurva's men beat up Ritu and she lands up in the hospital. Vidya decides to go after the rest of them.

She uses a fake name to set up a meeting at a building under construction with Sofi who is a property dealer. Once there, she holds him at gunpoint and makes him call Apurva and tell him that he is turning himself and the others into the police. Sofi then jumps off the building and kills himself knowing that Apurva will kill him now. Sutti Mama who had driven Sofi there sees Vidya come out of the building with a gun in her hand, jumping into his car and driving away. His car is hit by a truck and he dies on the spot. Apurva finally tells his father to tell the cops to stop Vidya. But before they can do that, she sneaks into the CM's house during Holi and kills Apurva and his father before walking away as the house explodes in a fireball.

== Cast ==
- Raveena Tandon as Vidya Chauhan
- Divya Jagdale as Ritu, Vidya's friend
- Saheem Khan as Sub-Inspector Akhil Sachdeva
- Madhur Mittal as Apurva Malik
- Shailendra Goel as Govardhan Malik
- Anurag Arora as Inspector Jayant Shroff
- Alisha Parveen Khan as Tia Chauhan
- Rushad Rana as Ravi Chauhan, Vidya's husband
- Pranav Brara as Sofi
- Amisha Sinha as Meenal, Tia's friend and schoolmate
- Piyush Kaushik as Sikander Beniwal
- Nitin Sharma as Inder Jhangra
- Ishan Bhatt as Kamran Qureshi
- Bhuvan Kaila as Harshit Poojary
- Sutinder Singh as Sutti Mama
- Umang Dev Shukla Farrukhabad

== Soundtrack ==
- "Zindagi Ae Zindagi"; Singer: Rahat Fateh Ali Khan
- "Aisi Hoti Hai Maa"; Singer: Kavita Seth
