= Chak De Bachche =

Television series

Chak De Bachche was an Indian television reality series that aired on 9X channel. The series is a little kids' dance show, where the kids dance with their partners to compete with the opposing teams. The series is produced by 9X and Saibaba Telefilms. The teams are divided into two separate teams: Metro Rockers ("Bade sehar ki bachche" - kids from big cities) & Desi Dhurandhars ("Chote sehar ke bachche" - kids from small cities)

Jury

- Salim–Sulaiman
- Raveena Tandon
- Ganesh Acharya

format n scripts

- Rajeev Arora
- Dr. Abhishek Dwivedi
- Thought Vendors

== Rules ==
There are a total of three disciplines, with each one judged by a different judge. The first discipline is composed of 'Music & Singing': Salim–Sulaiman; second discipline is composed of overall performance: Raveena Tandon; and the last discipline is composed of 'Choreography & Dancing': Ganesh Acharya.

Besides, each of the teams are assisted by a different captain: Team Rockers by Roshni Chopra and Desi Dhurandars by Manoj Tiwari.

== Contestants ==
Following is a list of contestants of 'Chak De Bachche':

Name	Team	Happy Card Round	Top 3
Deepak Tirkey / Nishta	Desi Dhurandars		Winner
Varun / Loria	Metro Rockers		1st Runner up
Rudraksh / Nidhi	Metro Rockers		2nd Runner up
Amaan / Mansi	Desi Dhurandars		
Abishek / Tanu	Desi Dhurandars		
Rik / Nemisha	Desi Dhurandars		Happycard Entrant
Alpansh / Debolina	Metro Rockers		Happycard Entrant
Tamojit Dasgupta / Rishika	Metro Rockers		
Vaibhav / Hargun	Metro Rockers		
Areeb / Prabhjoot	Desi Dhurandars		
Shubham / Rupali	Desi Dhurandars		
Kushal / Ketkee	Metro Rockers	Not in the Happy Round	
Rohan / Pooja	Metro Rockers	Not in the Happy Round	
Srejoni / Shazad	Desi Dhurandars	Not in the Happy Round	
