= Barood (1998 film) =

- Directed by: Pramod Chakravorty
- Written by: Rajeev Kaul; Praful Parekh; Javed Siddiqui(dialogue)
- Produced by: Pramod Chakravorty; Lakshmi Chakravorty(associate producer)
- Starring: Raakhee; Akshay Kumar; Raveena Tandon
- Edited by: Subhiraaj Pal
- Music by: Anand–Milind
- Release date: 7 August 1998
- Running time: 165 minutes
- Country: India
- Language: Hindi
- Budget: ₹5.50 crore
- Box office: ₹8.59 crore

Barood (transl. Gunpowder) is a 1998 Indian Hindi-language masala film directed and produced by Pramod Chakravorty. In 1976, he also directed and produced the movie of the same name. It stars Akshay Kumar, Raveena Tandon as the lead roles. Raakhee, Aruna Irani, Gulshan Grover, Mohnish Behl, Mohan Joshi, Amrish Puri played supporting roles in the film.

== Plot ==
Honest and diligent Police Inspector Jai Sharma suspects Mr. Singhal of being a hardcore criminal don, but is unable to apprehend him due to pressure from his superior officer, Police Commissioner Kalinath Gaur. Singhal's only daughter, Neha, is in love with Jai, and this news enrages Singhal as he wants her to marry Sanjay Gaur, the only son of the Commissioner, and he will not rest until he gets Jai killed, and will utilize every possible and available resource and influence to do this, which also includes exposing Gayetri's (Jai's mom) questionable past.

== Cast ==
- Raakhee as Gayatri Sharma
- Akshay Kumar as Jay Sharma
- Raveena Tandon as Neha Singhal
- Aruna Irani as Tara Khandelwal
- Gulshan Grover as Velji Chheda
- Mohnish Behl as Sanjay Gaur
- Mohan Joshi as Police Commissioner Kalinath Gaur
- Amrish Puri as Singhal
- Brij Gopal as Inspector Ashok Sharma
- Rana Jung Bahadur as Inspector Rana
- Shiva Rindani as Shiva
- Arjun as Jaggu
- Deepak Parashar as Inspector Shiv Sharma
- Suresh Chatwal as Sundar
- Rajesh Puri as Dance Show Organizer
- Ayesha Jhulka as Dancer / Singer
- Johnny Lever as Himself

== Soundtrack ==
Barood

Soundtrack album by Anand–Milind
- Released: 22 June 1998
- Genre: Feature film soundtrack
- Label: Venus Records & Tapes

Song	Singer
"Main Hoon Barood"	Abhijeet
"Sana San Sannana"	Abhijeet, Poornima
"Mach Gaya Shor"	Poornima
"Ek Ladki Ek Ladka"	Kumar Sanu, Alka Yagnik
"Hum To Tujhse"	Kumar Sanu, Alka Yagnik
"Raazi Raazi"	Udit Narayan, Alka Yagnik
