= Raveena Tandon =

Indian actress (born 1972)

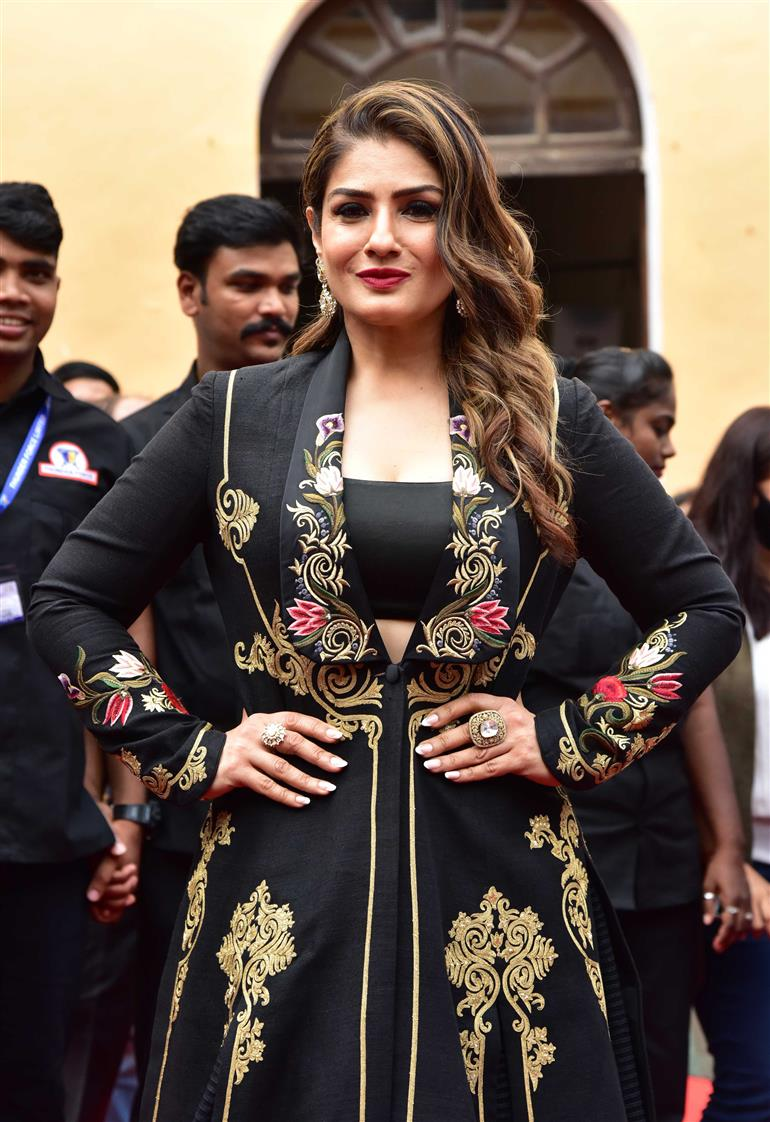
- Tandon in 2021
- Born: 26 October 1972 (age 54); Bombay (present-day Mumbai), Maharashtra, India
- Occupation: Actress
- Years active: 1991–present
- Works: Full list
- Spouse: Anil Thadani (m. 2004)
- Children: 4 (2 adopted)
- Father: Ravi Tandon
- Relatives: Rakhee Tandon (sister-in-law); Mac Mohan (uncle); Manjari Makijany (cousin); Kiran Rathod (cousin)
- Honours: Padma Shri (2023)

Raveena Tandon (born 26 October 1972) is an Indian actress primarily known for her work in Hindi films. One of the leading actresses of the 1990s, Tandon is known for her versatility and is the recipient of several awards, including a National Film Award, two Filmfare Awards and a Filmfare OTT Award. In 2023, she was awarded the Padma Shri, the fourth highest Indian civilian honour.

The daughter of director Ravi Tandon, she made her acting debut in the 1991 action film Patthar Ke Phool at age 18, which won her the Filmfare Award for Best Female Debut. Tandon established herself by playing the leading lady in the commercially successful action films Dilwale (1994), Mohra (1994), Khiladiyon Ka Khiladi (1996), and Ziddi (1997). She earned a nomination for the Filmfare Award for Best Supporting Actress for her role in the 1994 drama Laadla and in the late 1990s, she collaborated with Govinda in several successful comedies, including Bade Miyan Chote Miyan (1998), Dulhe Raja (1998) and Anari No.1 (1999). She also played against type in the crime dramas Ghulam-E-Mustafa (1997) and Shool (1999).

In the 2000s, Tandon ventured into arthouse cinema with roles in the 2001 films Daman and Aks, both of which garnered her critical acclaim, winning the National Film Award for Best Actress for the former and a Filmfare Special Performance Award for the latter. Post her marriage with film distributor Anil Thadani, Tandon took a break from films. She intermittently appeared on television with shows like the Sahara One drama Sahib Biwi Gulam (2004), the dance reality show Chak De Bachche (2008), and talk shows Isi Ka Naam Zindagi (2012) and Simply Baatien with Raveena (2014). After several years of hiatus, Tandon starred in the thriller Maatr (2017) and received praise for her leading role in the Netflix crime thriller series Aranyak (2021), winning a Filmfare OTT Award for Best Actress. Tandon had a supporting role in her highest-grossing release, K.G.F: Chapter 2 (2022).

Tandon is also an environmentalist and has worked with PETA since 2002. Tandon has four children, two adopted and two with her husband.

== Early life and background ==
Tandon was born on 26 October 1972 in Bombay (present-day Mumbai) to filmmaker Ravi Tandon and Veena Tandon. Tandon is a niece of character actor Mac Mohan and thus a cousin of Manjari Makijany, his daughter. She has a brother Rajiv Tandon, who was married to actress Rakhee Tandon. She is also a cousin of actress Kiran Rathod.

Tandon was educated at Jamnabai Narsee School in Juhu and attended Mithibai College in Mumbai. She started her career as a model, but during her internship at Genesis PR, she got her first film offer.

In an interview with Rediff Tandon stated, "I never thought I would become an actress. I was an intern at Genesis PR, helping ad-man Prahlad Kakkar, when friends and people around me started complimenting my looks. But photographer-director Shantanu Sheorey gave me the first break. He called and said he wanted to shoot with me. That was the time when models were becoming actors. I refused film offers. Prahlad kept saying millions of people are waiting for this chance and you keep refusing it. So I thought there was nothing to lose. Then Patthar Ke Phool happened."

== Career ==
=== Early work (1991–1993) ===
Tandon made her acting debut in 1991, with the film Patthar Ke Phool opposite Salman Khan, which was a box office hit. The film earned her the Filmfare Award for Lux New Face of the Year. This was followed by a series of box office failures including Jeena Marna Tere Sang, Divya Shakti, Parampara and Ek Hi Raasta among others.

=== Commercial success and recognition (1994–1999) ===
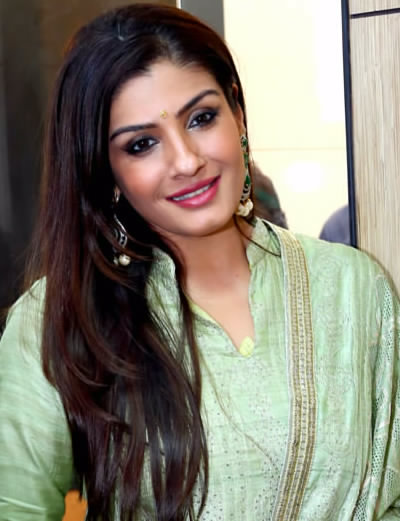
Tandon at an event

The year 1994 proved to be a turning point in her career with ten releases.Of these Dilwale opposite Ajay Devgn, Aatish: Feel the Fire opposite Sanjay Dutt, Laadla opposite Anil Kapoor, and Mohra opposite Akshay Kumar, emerged as the highest grossing films of the year. Andaz Apna Apna opposite Aamir Khan underperformed at the box office, but developed a cult following over the years since its release. Among these, Mohra became Tandon's breakthrough particularly due to her dance in the songs, "Too Cheez Badi Hain" and "Tip Tip Barsa Pani".

In 1995, Tandon starred opposite Shah Rukh Khan for the first time in Zamaana Deewana; the film failed to do well. Her 1996 film Khiladiyon Ka Khiladi opposite Akshay Kumar, was a commercial success. That year, she also appeared in the song "Shahar Ki Ladki", in Rakshak alongside Suniel Shetty. Tandon appeared in two successful films in 1997: Ziddi opposite Sunny Deol and Ghulam-E-Mustafa opposite Nana Patekar. Her other releases that year Daava and Vinashak – Destroyer – failed at the box office.

Tandon further achieved success as a leading actress in 1998 with two films opposite Govinda: Dulhe Raja and Bade Miyan Chote Miyan, both of which emerged as the highest-grossing films of the year. She received praises for her comic timing. That year, Tandon had several other commercial successes such as–Salaakhen opposite Sunny Deol, Gharwali Baharwali opposite Anil Kapoor and Aunty No. 1 opposite Govinda. However Keemat – They Are Back and Barood opposite Akshay Kumar, and Pardesi Babu opposite Govinda failed at the box office.

In 1999, Tandon appeared opposite Govinda in Anari No.1, a commercial success. She then appeared in the Kannada film Upendra opposite Upendra, which also became a box office success. A critic from Sify stated, "Raveena is adequate in her role and adds glamour to her role with rich costumes.". Tandon then received praises for her portrayal in Shool opposite Manoj Bajpayee, which later became a cult film. Anil Nair of Rediff.com was appreciative of Tandon's "subdued and convincing no-frills job".

=== Critical acclaim, hiatus and television (2000-2015) ===
In the 2000s, Tandon ventured into arthouse productions, to learn a realistic way of acting, and rejected several mainstream film offers. Tandon worked in films such as Bulandi (2000) and Aks (2001), which won her critical acclaim. She won several awards as well as the Filmfare Special Performance Award for her performance in Rakeysh Omprakash Mehra's Aks. A critic from The Hindu stated, "Raveena comes up with a gripping portrayal of a bar girl".

Her years in the industry paid off when she won the coveted National Film Award for Best Actress for her performance in Kalpana Lajmi's Daman: A Victim of Marital Violence (2001), where she played a battered wife to an abusive husband. She surprised critics and audiences with her performance in the film and received appreciation for her work. Critic Taran Adarsh said: "Raveena Tandon lends credibility to the role of a battered wife and walks away with the honours. The pathos she conveys through her expressions makes you realise that she's a performer of substance".

Since then, she has starred in several critically acclaimed films, such as Satta (2003) and Dobara (2004), but has not had much box office success. Her role as a middle-class woman thrust into the world of politics in the former was praised. Critic Taran Adarsh wrote: "Raveena Tandon delivers a bravura performance. The actress takes giant strides as a performer, giving the right touches to her character. Here's a performance that's bound to be noticed". Her role as a schizophrenic in Dobara was also praised with one critic saying: "Raveena is in sync with her character, playing her part with elaan". Tandon also worked in the Sahara One television series Sahib Biwi Gulam, based on the 1953 Bengali novel Saheb Bibi Golam by Bimal Mitra. Her only release in 2006 was Sandwich which opened to poor reviews and reception. After doing several films, she took a break from actively appearing in films. During this period, her only major appearance was in the Telugu film Pandavulu Pandavulu Tummeda opposite Mohan Babu, which was a box office success.

During her break from films, Tandon actively appeared on television. In 2014, she judged season 1 of CEO's Got Talent on CNBC TV18 with Mahesh Bhatt and Raj Nayak. She later hosted Issi Ka Naam Zindagi and Simply Baatien with Raveena. In 2015, she made a comeback to Bollywood in longtime friend Anurag Kashyap's magnum opus Bombay Velvet. Playing a sultry jazz singer, her brief performance was highly praised by critics. Following this, Tandon became a judge for Sabse Bada Kalakar and Nach Baliye 9.

=== Intermittent work and streaming projects (2017-present) ===
Following a three-year hiatus from films, Tandon had two releases in 2017. In Maatr, she played a mother who seeks revenge for her daughter's rape. Udita Jhunjhunwala noted, "Tandon internalises the horror and conveys the pain through her eyes, which turn fiery once she tastes first blood. She’s most convincing as the caring mother and teacher." It emerged a moderate success at the box office. Her next release of the year was Onir's Shab, where she plays a socialite. In 2019, she appeared in the song "Sheher Ki Ladki" from Khandaani Shafakhana. In 2021, Tandon made her web debut with Aranyak, where she played a police officer. Shubhra Gupta stated, "Raveena is unafraid of appearing uncouth and crude, and can toughen up and soften when the occasion demands, even if the unsophisticated accent slips".

Tandon made her comeback to Kannada films with KGF: Chapter 2, playing the Prime Minister. A commercial success, it became third highest-grossing Indian film of all time. Janani K felt that she delivers an "earnest performance". In 2023, she played a gynaecologist whose husband cheats on her in One Friday Night, opposite Milind Soman. Abhishek Srivastava noted, "Raveena's portrayal of Lata is commendable with a sincere performance, but one wonder why she didn't lend her voice to the film."

Tandon appeared in two films and one series in 2024. She first played a lawyer opposite Manav Vij in Patna Shuklla. In her next film Ghudchadi, she appeared opposite Sanjay Dutt, playing a mother who falls in love with her daughter's boyfriend's father. The film received mixed to negative reviews from critics. She then appeared in the series Karmma Calling, playing the lead. In 2025, she played a police officer's wife opposite Suniel Shetty in Inn Galiyon Mein.

== Off-screen work ==
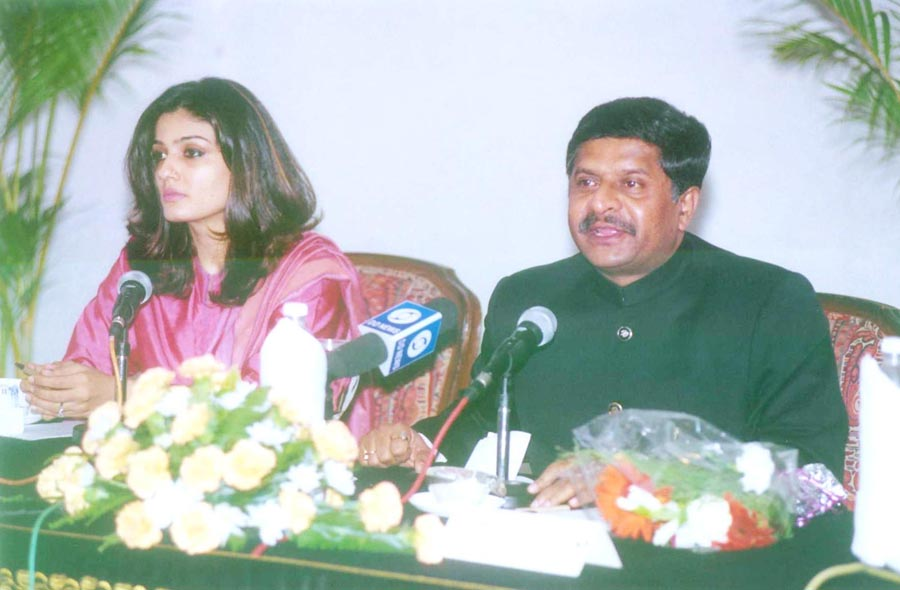
Tandon with Union Minister Ravi Shankar Prasad in 2003

Tandon was the chairperson of the Children's Film Society of India from 2003, but from 2004 the actress began to get complaints that she did not attend the organisation's meetings and that she was not involved with the activities set up by the society. In September 2005, Tandon resigned from her post citing personal reasons.

In November 2005, Tandon sued the websites, Shaadi.com and Shaaditimes.com, claiming that they were using unauthorised images of her to promote the site. She also sued the owner of Satyanet Solutions, as they claimed that Tandon and her husband had met through the website.

In November 2002, Tandon sang to support People for the Ethical Treatment of Animals. She has posed in many advertisement campaigns joining the likes of John Abraham, Shilpa Shetty and Amisha Patel. On the issue of cows being slaughtered for their skin, she said "Their abuse at the hands of corrupt skin and meat traders must be stopped".

As part of her charity work, she appeared in the music video "Betiyaan" (Save the Girl Child), sung by Shankar Mahadevan, Sunidhi Chauhan and Sonu Nigam. In 2023, she became the first person from the entertainment industry, chosen to be a delegate at W20, the Women's empowerment engagement wing at G20 New Delhi summit.

== Personal life ==
Tandon adopted two girls, Pooja and Chhaya, as a single mother in 1995 when they were 11 and 8-years-old, respectively.

=== Relationship with Akshay Kumar ===
During the 1990s, Tandon dated actor Akshay Kumar. She had announced him as her boyfriend. Despite being engaged, they later parted ways. In a 1998 interview with Rediff, Kumar admitted to having been engaged to Tandon while also claiming that they never married. In an interview with actor Simi Garewal, Tandon accused Kumar of cheating and improper behaviour. He is alleged to have even said, "Akshay Kumar used me and conveniently dropped me after he found someone else. Now Kumar and Tandon are said to be sharing normal relations, with letting bygones be bygones, though the sequence of events still remain etched in many memories."

=== Marriage and family ===
Tandon began dating film distributor Anil Thadani, during the making of her film Stumped (2003). Their engagement was announced in November 2003. She married Thadani on 22 February 2004 in Jag Mandir Palace, Udaipur, Rajasthan according to Punjabi Khatri and Sindhi traditions. Tandon gave birth to her daughter Rasha, in March 2005. In July 2008, she gave birth to her son Ranbirvardhan.

== In the media ==
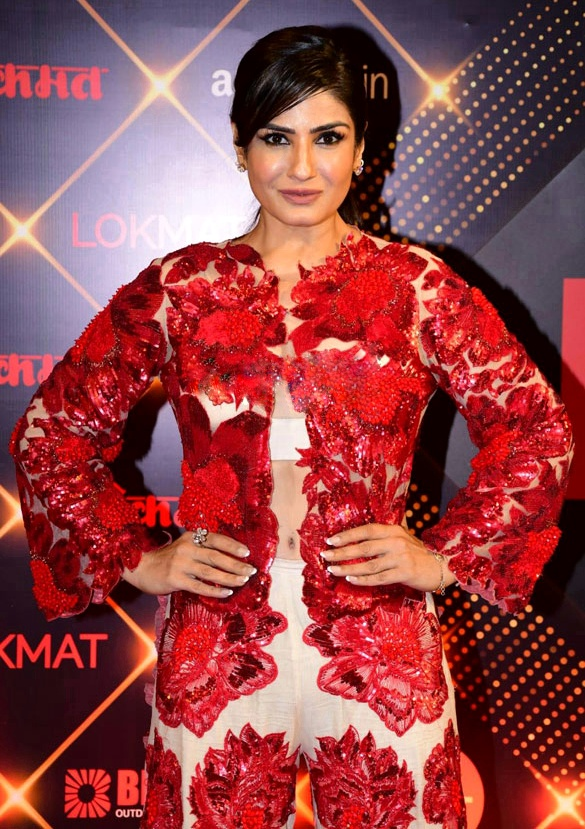
Tandon in 2022

Tandon has often been regarded as one of the most popular super star and great actresses of the 1990s. Devesh Sharma of Filmfare stated, "Tandon was one of the most vivacious actresses to have graced the silver screen". Rediff.com noted, "Ravishing and Raveena are synonymous with each other." Outlook India noted, "Tandon's filmography boasts of commercial entertainers as well as offbeat movies." Times Now termed the actress "ravishing and rebellious". Throughout her career, Tandon was widely known for her dance numbers. Praising her dance, Filmfare noted, "A natural dancer who radiated oomph by the bucket, Raveena literally set the silver screen on fire with her moves". Tandon ranks among the highest-grossing actresses in Indian cinema.

Tandon termed her performance in Shool and Daman: A Victim of Marital Violence, as the films that changed the perception of the audience. She added, "People took me seriously as an actor after Shool and Daman. I was being perceived only as a 'pretty face' until these films showcased my acting capabilities." One of the highest paid actress of the 90s, Tandon appeared on Box Office India's "Top Actresses" list of 1994. She appeared on Forbes India's Celebrity 100 list of 2019, ranking 89th, with an estimated annual income of ₹24 million (US$260,000). Rediff.com placed Tandon in their "Best Bollywood Actresses" list of 2002 and 2021. Times of India placed her at 10th position in its "50 Beautiful Faces" list. Tandon is a celebrity endorser for brands including iAir, Lux, 7 Up and Emami. In 2016, Rapper Badshah used Tandon's name in his song "Kar Gayi Chull", from the film Kapoor & Sons. In 2022, she was placed in Outlook India's "75 Best Bollywood Actresses" list. In 2023, the Government of India honoured Tandon with the Padma Shri, the fourth-highest civilian award, for her contribution to Indian cinema.

== Awards and nominations ==
=== Film awards ===
Year	Award	Category	Film	Result	Ref.
1992	37th Filmfare Awards	Best Female Debut	Patthar Ke Phool	Won	
1995	40th Filmfare Awards	Best Supporting Actress	Laadla	Nominated	
1999	People's Choice Awards	Favourite Actress	Shool	Nominated	
2001	People's Choice Awards	Favourite Actress	Daman: A Victim of Marital Violence	Nominated	
2001	48th National Film Awards	Best Actress	Daman: A Victim of Marital Violence	Won	
2002	47th Filmfare Awards	Special Performance Award	Aks	Won	
2002	Bengal Film Journalists' Association Awards	Best Supporting Actress	Aks	Won	
2002	Bollywood Movie Awards	Best Actress (Critics)	Aks	Won	
2002	Bollywood Movie Awards	Best Supporting Actress	Aks	Won	
2002	Awadh Samman	Awarded by the Government of Uttar Pradesh	Aks	Won	
2002	Screen Awards	Best Supporting Actress	Aks	Won	
2005	Screen Awards	Best Actress	Satta	Nominated	
2022	Filmfare OTT Awards	Best Actress (Drama Series)	Aranyak	Won	
2022	Indian Film Festival of Melbourne	Best Actress in a Series	Aranyak	Nominated	
2022	Indian Television Academy Awards	Scroll of Honour	—N/a	Won	
2022	Lokmat Stylish Awards	Most Stylish Timeless Icon	—N/a	Won	
2023	Bollywood Hungama Style Icons	Most Stylish Eternal Diva	—N/a	Won	
2024	Bollywood Hungama OTT India Fest	Inspirational Showbiz Icon of the Year	—N/a	Won	

=== Other recognitions ===
- 2023: Tandon received the Padma Shri for her contribution in the field of arts.

== See also ==
- List of Indian film actresses
