= Anth =

- Directed by: Sanjay Khanna
- Written by: Dilip Shukla
- Produced by: Ashok Honda
- Starring: Suniel Shetty; Somy Ali
- Cinematography: Najeeb Khan
- Edited by: Ashok Honda
- Music by: Anand–Milind
- Release date: 1994
- Running time: 140 mins
- Country: India
- Language: Hindi

Anth is a 1994 Indian action film directed by Sanjay Khanna, produced by Ashok Honda and starred Suniel Shetty, and Somy Ali in pivotal roles. Aloknath, Paresh Rawal, Mohan Joshi, Deepak Shirke, Vijayendra Ghatge, Neena Gupta, and Makrand Deshpande also featured in the film.

== Plot ==
Kali is a local ruffian who harasses students in his college. The principal Satyaprakash Saxena is helpless to stop him because Kali is the son of Dabla, a powerful gangster in the city. Satyaprakash has two sons, advocate Vikas and engineer Vijay, and a daughter, Pooja, who also studies in the same college. Vijay is in a relationship with Priya, a colleague in his engineering company. Satyaprakash had once given a false statement out of fear in the case of a student who was killed by Kali and was framed as a suicide. The deceased student's father cursed him that one day the same will happen in his family.

One day, Satyaprakash slaps Kali after being fed up with him harassing the students. To take revenge, Kali kidnaps and rapes Pooja and then kills her when her fiancée Raja comes to her rescue. The corrupt inspector Shirke puts the blame on Raja and has him killed while in custody. This enrages Vijay, and he embarks upon a bloody and violent fight to cleanse the city of ruffians like Kali, Dabla and Shirke. ACP Kulkarni shows up in a special appearance as an honest cop.

== Cast ==
- Suniel Shetty as Vijay Saxena
- Somy Ali as Priya
- Aloknath as Principal Satyaprakash Saxena
- Paresh Rawal as Dabla
- Deepak Shirke as Inspector Shirke
- Rita Bhaduri as Priya's Mother
- Makrand Deshpande as Kali
- Vijayendra Ghatge as Advocate Vikas Saxena
- Neena Gupta as Mrs. Vikas Saxena
- Mohan Joshi as ACP Kulkarni
- Vinay Sapru as Raja
- Narendra Gupta as the telephone booth owner

== Soundtrack ==
All lyrics are written by Sameer; all music is composed by Anand–Milind.

No.	Title	Singer(s)	Length
1.	"Na Vaada Karte"	Suresh Wadkar, Sadhana Sargam	6:02
2.	"Tu Deewani"	Kumar Sanu, Sadhana Sargam	4:30
3.	"Aaja Jaan-E-Jaan"	Abhijeet, Kavita Krishnamurthy	5:27
4.	"Dil Mera"	Sapna Mukherjee	6:34
5.	"Jaan-E-Jaan Dil Na Jala"	Kumar Sanu, Kavita Krishnamurthy	5:58
6.	"Aaja Sikha Doon"	Udit Narayan, Poornima	4:58
