= Sabse Bada Kalakar =

- Genre: Reality
- Written by: Dinesh Brigedier, Pradeep Chaturvedi
- Presented by: Jay Bhanushali, Jamie Lever
- Judges: Raveena Tandon; Arshad Warsi; Boman Irani
- Country of origin: India
- Original language: Hindi
- No. of seasons: 1
- No. of episodes: 28

Production
- Production location: Mumbai
- Camera setup: Multi-camera
- Running time: Approx. 40 minutes
- Production company: Frames Production

Original release
- Network: Sony Entertainment Television
- Release: 8 April – 9 July 2017

Sabse Bada Kalakar (transl. Greatest artist) is an auditioning Reality show on Sony Entertainment Television. The judges of the show are Boman Irani, Raveena Tandon and Arshad Warsi. This show is written by Dinesh Brigedier This show was rumoured to replace Indian Idol. The title track was sung by LV Revanth, the winner of Indian Idol.

The first episode of this season was aired on 8 April 2017 and last episode of this season was aired on 9 July 2017.

== Acting gurus ==
Each Contestant is paired up an Acting Guru with whom they will have to perform acts if in the danger zone and who will be mentoring the kids. The acting Guru's on the show are:

Karan Singh Chhabra, Subuhi Joshi, Kamna Pathak, Onisha Sharma, Mohit Agarwal, Saurabh Nayyar, Sumit Goswami, Bhasha Sumbli, Arun Shinde, Manjiri Popala.

== Top Ten ==
The Top Ten after the auditions are : Vrinda Gujral, Mahi Soni, Inayat Verma, Dhruv Acharya, Udhbhav, Satyam Arora, Keshav Mehndiratta, Mandeep Kaur Sekhon, Virad Tyagi, Tanya and Tanisha (twins).

== Winner ==
The Winner of Sabse Bada Kalakar 2017 Grand Finale is 7 year old boy Virad Tyagi from Saharanpur, Uttar Pradesh.
