= Saheb Bibi Golam =

1953 novel by Bimal Mitra

Saheb Bibi Golam (King, Queen and Knave)
- Author: Bimal Mitra
- Language: Bengali
- Genre: Novel
- Publication place: India
- Media type: Print (Hardback)

Saheb Bibi Golam is a 1953 Bengali novel written by Bimal Mitra (1912–1991) and is set in Calcutta, India during the last years of the nineteenth century. It was serialised in the Bengali-language literary magazine Desh in November 1952.

The novel tells the story of the sumptuous lifestyle and the decay of a feudal family. It is the story of Pateshwari aka Chhoto Bou, a woman who wants to experience romance, to be a real wife, to invent for herself and live a new kind of conjugality. But the book also tells the story of Calcutta, now Kolkata, and of all the people who lived there.

== Adaptations ==
The novel was adapted into Bengali film, Saheb Bibi Golam (King, Queen, Knave) in 1956, starring Sumitra Devi, Uttam Kumar and Chhabi Biswas. A Hindi version, Sahib Bibi Aur Ghulam released in 1962 starring Meena Kumari, Rehman, Guru Dutt and Waheeda Rehman among others, went on to become a huge hit.

== Title ==
The title Sahib Bibi Aur Ghulam is translated in English as King, Queen and Knave. The literal meaning comes from playing cards.
