= Bimal Mitra =

Bengali writer (1912–1991)

- Born: 18 March 1912; Fatehpur, Bengal Province, British India
- Died: 2 December 1991 (aged 79); Chetla, Calcutta, West Bengal, India
- Occupation: writer
- Writing career
- Genres: Novelist, Stories
- Notable works: Saheb Bibi Golam, Kori Diye Kinlaam
- Notable awards: Rabindra Puraskar

Bimal Mitra (18 March 1912 – 2 December 1991) was an Indian writer in Bengali. Bimal Mitra was equally adept in writing in Bengali as well as in Hindi, and wrote more than one hundred novels and short stories. His books were translated into many Indian languages.

== Life ==
Mitra was born in 1912 in British India. He had served in Indian railways in Bilaspur for long years. He was working in the Chakradharpur Division in the 1940s in the Control Organisation. One of his novelettes Char Chokher Khela is based on the lives of the Anglo-Indian population of Chakradharpur railway colony. He resigned from Indian Railway Services in 1950 at the age of 38 to become a full-time writer.

Mitra died on 2 December 1991, at his residence named Baansh Bhavan in Chetla, South Calcutta.

== Films ==
Many of Bimal Mitra's novels have been made into successful films. One of his most popular works, Shaheb Bibi Golam (January 1953) which was adapted into a hugely popular movie. He also earned a Filmfare nomination for Best Story for the film.

Set in the last years of the nineteenth century, his most of novels tells the story of the sumptuous lifestyle and the decay of a feudal family. Asami Hazir is another popular work of Bimal Mitra. The novel is based on the true story of a man who wants to repent for the sins of his father and grandfather. The novel was adapted into a TV series for Doordarshan - Mujrim Hazir. Kari Diye Kinlam is another works which have got a visual interpretation so called middle class family of Bengal, based on his novel.

== Literary works ==
- Saheb Bibi Golam (King, Queen and Slave)
- Kori Diye Kinlaam (Bought With Money)
- Begum Mary Bishwas (A Historical Novel of the Period of Nawab Siraujdalla / British Lord Clive)
- Ekak Dasak Shatak (Uni Deci Centi)
- Asami Hazir (At Your Service)
- Pati Param guru
- Rajabadal
- Sab Jhut hai
- Ei Norodeho (This Human body)
- Mrityuheen (Deathless)
- Tomra dujone mile
- Gulmohor
- Ja debi
- Sursatiya ( This Novel was published in "Saptahik Hindustan" on 22 February 1970 )

Short stories

- "Neelnesha"
- "Bonshodhor"
- "Lojjahoro"
- "Jenana Sambad"
- "Putul Didi"
- "Amrutyu"
- "Milonanto"
- "Dori"
- "Rekjon Mohapurush"
- "RaniSaheba"
- "Gharonti"
- "Satashe Srabon"
- "Ashukaka"
- "Nimaontrito Indranath"
- "Amir o Urboshi"
