= Madan Jain =

Indian actor

- Occupation: Actor
- Years active: 1980–present
- Spouse: Dr. Trupti Jain

Madan Jain is an Indian actor in Hindi language films.

== Career ==
His major works include Saaransh and Ankush.

== Filmography ==
=== Films ===
- 1980 Albert Pinto Ko Gussa Kyon Ata Hai
- 1980 The Naxalites – Comrade Babu
- 1981 Pehla Adhyay
- 1981 Sazaye Maut
- 1981 Chakra
- 1981 Kalyug – Kulkarni
- 1982 Vijeta – Flight Lieutenant Venkat, Angad's friend
- 1983 Ardh Satya
- 1983 Godam – Inspector Patil
- 1984 Party
- 1984 Mashaal – Somu (Somesh)
- 1984 Saaransh – Vilas Chitre
- 1985 Janam – Vilas Desai
- 1985 Ek Bhool (TV Movie)
- 1985 Bhulaye Na Bane
- 1985 Scandal (Video)
- 1986 Ankush – Shashi
- 1986 Nasamajh
- 1987 Thikana – Cameraman Avinash
- 1987 Kaal Chakra – Shankar Pradhan
- 1988 Inteqam – Police Inspector
- 1989 Wasta
- 1990 Pratibandh
- 1990 Vanchit
- 1991 Milan Ki Aag
- 1992 Benaam Rishte
- 1995 Andolan – Police Inspector Subhash
- 1995 God and Gun
- 1995 Gundaraj – Police Inspector Vijay Sharma
- 1995 Ek Ka Jawab Do
- 1996 Vijeta – Advocate (uncredited)
- 1997 Anyay Hi Anyay
- 1998 Zakhm – Anwar Hashmi
- 1999 Sangharsh – Police Officer
- 2001 Yeh Raaste Hain Pyaar Ke – Madhuri's brother in law
- 2002 Kranti – Traitor Police Inspector Pawar
- 2002 Kuch Tum Kaho Kuch Hum Kahein – Jaikumar Solanki
- 2005 Page 3 – ACP Uday Yadav
- 2008 Gumnaam: The Mystery – Rishi Gandhi
- 2013 Haani – Teacher
- 2014 Heartless

=== Television ===
- 1992 Khali Haat (TV Serial)
- 1996 Amar Prem
- 1995-2001 Aahat
- 1998-2018 C.I.D
- 2011 Taarak Mehta Ka Ooltah Chashmah
