= List of awards and nominations received by Mahesh Bhatt =

Mahesh Bhatt awards and nominations
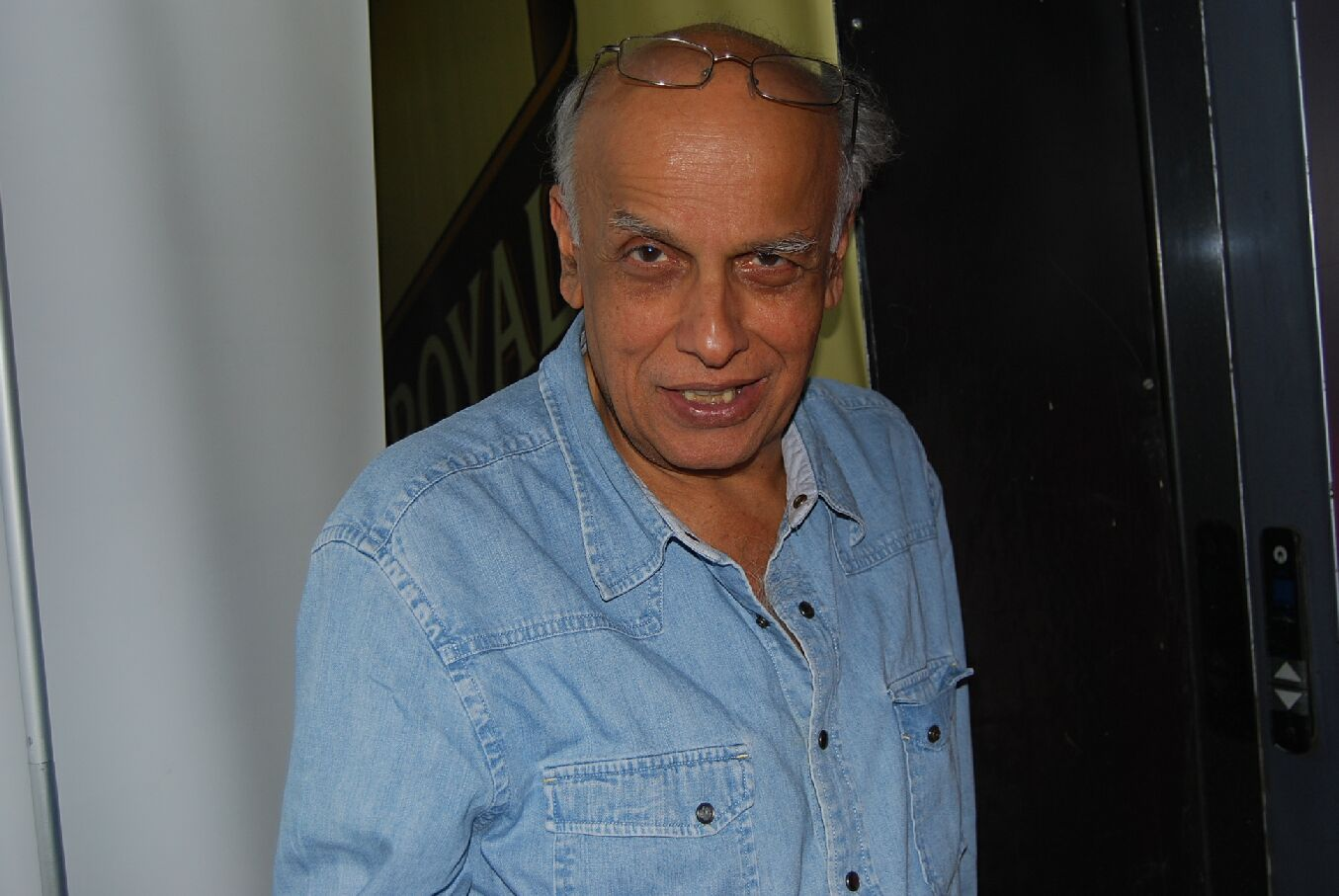
Awards and nominations
Award	Wins	Nominations
National Film Awards	5	0
Filmfare Awards	4	7
Moscow International Film Festival	1	1
Zee Cine Awards	1	1
Screen Awards	1	7
Stardust Awards	1	0
International Indian Film Academy Awards	1	0
Bengal Film Journalists' Association Awards	1	1
Star Guild Awards	1	0

Totals (Note: Certain award groups do not simply award one winner. They acknowledge several different recipients, have runners-up, and have third place. Since this is a specific recognition and is different from losing an award, runner-up mentions are considered wins in this award tally. For simplification and to avoid errors, each award in this list has been presumed to have had a prior nomination.)
- Wins: 16
- Nominations: 20

Mahesh Bhatt is an Indian filmmaker and director who works in Hindi Cinema. He has won several awards, including five National Film Awards and four Filmfare Awards. A notable film from his earlier period is Saaransh, screened at the 14th Moscow International Film Festival. He also won a Special Prize at Film Festival for the film. It became India's official entry for the Academy Award for Best Foreign Language Film for that year.

== National Film Awards ==
The National Film Awards is the most prominent film award ceremony in India. Established in 1954, it is administered by the International Film Festival of India and the Indian government's Directorate of Film Festivals. The awards are presented by the President of India.

List of National Film Awards received by Mahesh Bhatt
Year	Category	Work	Result	Ref.
1994	Special Mention (feature film)	Hum Hain Rahi Pyar Ke	Won	
1996	Best Feature Film in Urdu	Sardari Begum	Won	
1997	Best Feature Film in Hindi	Gudia	Won	
1999	Best Film on Other Social Issues	Tamanna	Won	
1999	Nargis Dutt Award for Best Feature Film on National Integration	Zakhm	Won	

=== Filmfare Awards ===
The Filmfare Awards are presented annually by The Times Group for excellence in Hindi cinema.

List of Filmfare Awards and nominations received by Mahesh Bhatt
Year	Category	Work	Result	Ref.
1984	Best Dialogue	Arth	Won	
1985	Best Director	Saaransh	Nominated	
1985	Best Story	Saaransh	Won	
1991	Best Director	Aashiqui	Nominated	
1992	Best Director	Dil Hai Ke Manta Nahin	Nominated	
1994	Best Director	Hum Hain Rahi Pyar Ke	Nominated	
1999	Best Story	Zakhm	Won	
1999	Outstanding Film of the Year	Zakhm	Won	
2007	Best Story	Gangster	Nominated	

== Moscow International Film Festival ==
The Moscow International Film Festival (MIFF) is one of the oldest global film festivals, first held in 1935.

Recognition at the Moscow International Film Festival
Year	Category	Work	Result	Ref.
1985	Special Prize	Saaransh	Won	
1985	Golden Prize	Saaransh	Nominated	

== Zee Cine Awards ==
The Zee Cine Awards are presented by Zee Entertainment Enterprises for excellence in Hindi cinema.

Zee Cine Awards received by Mahesh Bhatt
Year	Category	Work	Result	Ref.
2003	Best Screenplay	Raaz	Won	
2014	Best Film	Aashiqui 2	Nominated	

== Screen Awards ==
The Screen Awards are annual honours recognizing cinematic excellence in Hindi cinema.

Screen Awards nominations received by Mahesh Bhatt
Year	Category	Work	Result
1984	Best Director	Arth	Nominated
1985	Best Director	Saaransh	Nominated
1985	Best Director	Janam	Nominated
1991	Best Director	Aashiqui	Nominated
1992	Best Director	Dil Hai Ke Manta Nahin	Nominated
1994	Best Director	Hum Hain Rahi Pyar Ke	Nominated
1999	Best Story	Zakhm	Won

== Stardust Awards ==
The Stardust Awards recognize excellence in Hindi cinema as voted by the public and critics.

Year	Category	Work	Result	Ref.
2013	Best Film – Thriller	Jannat 2	Won	

== Star Guild Awards ==
The Star Guild Awards, presented by the Apsara Film & Television Producers Guild, honour excellence in Indian film and television.

Year	Category	Work	Result
2014	Guild Hall of Fame	Aashiqui 2	Won

== International Indian Film Academy Awards ==
The International Indian Film Academy Awards (IIFA Awards) honour Bollywood films and talent on a global platform.

Year	Category	Work	Result	Ref.
2003	Best Screenplay	Raaz	Won	

== Bengal Film Journalists' Association Awards ==
The Bengal Film Journalists' Association Awards are India's oldest critics’ awards, recognizing cinematic excellence.

Year	Category	Work	Result	Ref.
2000	Best Director	Zakhm	Won	

== Other recognition ==
- 2013: Honoured by Bollywood Walk of Fame as his hand print was preserved for posterity at Bandra Bandstand in Mumbai.
- In 2015, Bhatt was honoured by the Rotary Club of Mumbai for his consistent work in promoting secular values, communal harmony, and human rights in society.
- As of December 2018 Bhatt was a member of the Board of Patrons of the Mother Teresa Awards.
- In 2019, he was conferred the Lifetime Achievement Award at the Jagran Film Festival for his impactful cinematic career.
- In 2020, Bhatt was honoured by Lokmat Media Group as the Lokmat Maharashtrian of the Year Awards for his significant contributions to Indian cinema and socio-political discourse.
- In 2021, he received another Lifetime Achievement Award at the Bollywood International Film Festival (BIFF), recognizing his contribution to Indian storytelling and direction.
