= Giddh =

- Directed by: T.S. Ranga
- Written by: T.S. Ranga (Story & Screenplay); Vasant Dev (dialogues)
- Produced by: T.S. Ranga
- Starring: Smita Patil; Om Puri; Nana Patekar
- Edited by: Aruna-Vikas
- Music by: B.V. Karanth; Vasant Dev (lyrics)
- Release date: July 9, 1984
- Running time: 1 hr. 53 min.
- Country: India
- Language: Hindi

Giddh (The Vultures) is a 1984 Hindi film directed by T.S. Ranga starring Smita Patil, Om Puri and Nana Patekar among others. It was Giddh which brought fame for Ranga. Critics still rate performance of Om Puri in Giddh as the best in his (Om Puri) career. While Giddh dealt with a variety of issues around prostitution, it was not a simple condemnation of the Devadasi system. Ranga approached the issue from both the sides and offered a balanced outlook. Giddh is being described as one of the best Indian films dealing with poverty and the social evils it breeds. At the 32nd National Film Awards, the film won the Special Jury Award for "in-depth depiction of the helplessness of people struggling against the Devadasi tradition." Film's music is given by B.V. Karanth with lyrics by Vasant Dev, and features songs like Yellamma Yellamma and Main Nadiya Ban Jaoon sung by Ila Arun and Devaki Pandit.

== Plot ==
In a remote village at Karnataka-Maharashtra border in India, due to being ridden with superstition, the poor residents follow Devadasi tradition, according to which young girls are given up by their families, in the service of Goddess Yellamma. The landlords, priests and other men take advantage of these young girls and pimps like Veerapppan take them to brothels in Bombay. Bhashya, a labourer, and his wife Hanumi lead an attempt at awakening against the practice by deciding to save Laksmi from becoming a Devadasi with the help of Masterji, going against the powerful feudal lord Desai.

== Cast ==
- Smita Patil as Hanumi
- Om Puri as Bhashya
- Nana Patekar as Veerappan
- Achyut Potdar as Desai
- Gopi Desai as Sundari
- Savita Bajaj as Sundari
- Vikas Desai as Patil
- Vijay Kashyap as Katra
- M. K. Raina as Masterji
- Naseeruddin Shah as Politician (Special Appearance)
- S. Sathyendra as Veerappan's friend (uncredited)
