= Chakra (1981 film) =

- DVD cover
- Directed by: Rabindra Dharmaraj
- Written by: Jaywant Dalvi, Rabindra Dharmaraj
- Produced by: Pradeep Uppoor
- Starring: Naseeruddin Shah; Smita Patil; Kulbhushan Kharbanda
- Cinematography: Barun Mukherjee
- Edited by: Bhanudas
- Music by: Hridaynath Mangeshkar
- Distributed by: Neo Films
- Release date: 1981 (India)
- Running time: 140 minutes
- Country: India
- Language: Hindi

Chakra (transl. Cycle) is a 1981 Hindi movie directed by Rabindra Dharmaraj. The film is the first and last directorial attempt of Rabindra Dharmaraj. The film stars Naseeruddin Shah, Smita Patil and Kulbhushan Kharbanda.

== Plot ==
Amma and her son Benwa become Mumbai's slum-dwellers after running away from their village after her husband kills a moneylender who tried to rape her. The husband is then shot trying to steal some tin to build a hut.

In Mumbai, Amma has a lover who provides for her and her son. Since the lover is a truck driver who travels most of the time, Amma takes on another lover – a vain pimp and petty crook, Lukka, who becomes Benwa's idol. Lukka is on parole and ordered to be present before the police every day.

Benwa marries the young Amli. Amma meanwhile becomes pregnant, though it is never clear whose child it is. Amma, of course, lets Anna know that it is his because she knows that of her two lovers, he alone is capable and responsible enough to take care of her and her child.

Lukka reappears, ravaged by syphilis and drugs; he is now a changed man and is disenchanted with the criminal life. But he still lives a life of crime and it is implied that there is no other choice for him. He even tries to dissuade Benwa from a life of crime without much success. Lukka is assaulted by the police at his illicit liquor den. The climax has Lukka assaulting a chemist who refuses to give him medicines unless he pays for it. Lukka grabs some medicines and makes a run for it, is chased by the police and hides in Amma's hut. The cops find him and arrest both him and Benwa, beating them brutally in the process. Amma has a miscarriage in the scuffle. In the end, bulldozers arrives to flatten the entire slum. A sort of exodus is shown in the final moments of the movie – and Benwa and Amli move on to a new slum, and a new shanty hut to continue the Chakra.

== Cast ==
- Naseeruddin Shah as Lukka
- Smita Patil as Amma
- Kulbhushan Kharbanda as Anna
- Ranjit Chowdhry as Benwa
- Dilip Dhawan as Amma's husband
- Kaluram Dhobale as Child
- Arun Bakshi as Police inspector
- Rohini Hattangadi as Laxmi
- Salim Ghouse as Raghu
- Anjali Paigankar as Chenna
- Savita Bajaj as mentally challenged Chamnya's mother
- Suresh Bhagwat as Sweeper
- Yunus Parvez as Minister
- Suhas Bhalekar as drunkard in slums
- Alka Kubal as Amli
- Sudhir Pandey as Bhandari
- Uttam Sirur as Chamnya
- Sharayu Bhopatkar as Bhagi
- Satish Kaushik as boot polish guy
- Madan Jain as Amli's brother
- Sumant Mastakar as Amli's father
- Ratan Gaurang as watchman

== Reviews ==
Indiatoday praised the performances of the actors calling the performances "virtuoso". It wrote "And the prima donna for playing the role of the oppressed with her beauty-amidst dirt looks and her dark expressive eyes, which can project the hopeless exploitation of a thousand years and a raw promiscuous sexuality without a blink, is Smita Patil. Her latest award-winning performance in Chakra as Amma, an emigrant Andrhaite slumdweller in Bombay, follows her much acclaimed roles in Aakrosh as an Adivasi and as a village girl in Benegal's Manthan".

== Awards and nominations ==
Year	Category	Recipient(s)	Results
Filmfare Awards
1982	Best Film	Pradeep Uppoor	Nominated
1982	Best Director	Rabindra Dharmaraj	Nominated
1982	Best Actor	Nasseruddin Shah	Won
1982	Best Actress	Smita Patil	Won
1982	Best Story	Jaywant Dalvi	Nominated
1982	Best Art Direction	Bansi Chandragupta	Won
Locarno International Film Festival
1981	Golden Leopard	Rabindra Dharmaraj	Won
1981	Prize of the Ecumenical Jury	Rabindra Dharmaraj	Won
National Film Awards
1981	Best Actress	Smita Patil	Won

== Additional information ==
Kundan Shah was the chief assistant director, and Rajkumar Santoshi was the special assistant to the director on this movie. The art direction was by Bansi Chandragupta.
