= Arvind Deshpande =

Indian film actor (1932–1987)

- Born: 31 May 1932; Bombay, Maharashtra, India
- Died: 3 January 1987 (aged 54); Bombay, Maharashtra, India
- Occupations: Actor; director
- Spouse: Sulabha Deshpande

Arvind Deshpande (31 May 1932 – 3 January 1987) was an acclaimed Indian film, theatre and television actor and theatre director. Apart from Marathi theatre as well as Hindi theatre in Mumbai, he acted in many mainstream Bollywood as well as art house films as a character actor, apart from TV series and plays.

== Birth and career ==
He was born on 31 May 1932 in Mumbai.

Deshpande was a leading figure in experimental theatre movement of the 1960s. He was associated with Rangayan, that he co-founded with his wife Sulabha Deshpande and Vijaya Mehta. In 1971 along with his wife Sulabha Deshpande he co-founded theatre group Awishkar along with its children's wing Chandrashala, which continues to perform professional children theatre. Arvind and Sulabha Deshpande along with playwright Vijay Tendulkar were also at the centre of the Chhabildas Movement in Marathi experimental theatre during the 1960s and 70s.

== Personal life ==
Arvind was married to noted theatre actor-director, Sulabha Deshpande.

== Awards ==
- National Film Award for Best Feature Film in Marathi

== Death ==
He died on 3 January 1987.

== Filmography ==
=== Films ===
As actor
| Year | Title | Role | Language | Notes |
|---|---|---|---|---|
| 1971 | Shantata! Court Chalu Aahe | | Marathi | |
| 1975 | Zunj | | | |
| 1976 | Shaque | Subramaniam | Hindi | |
| 1977 | Chaani | | | |
| 1977 | Chani | | | |
| 1978 | Ankhiyon Ke Jharokhon Se | Dr Kapoor | Hindi | |
| 1978 | Gaman | Shankar | Hindi | |
| 1979 | Baton Baton Mein | Mr. Braganza | Hindi | |
| 1979 | Saanch Ko Aanch Nahin | Satyaprakash Agarwal | Hindi | |
| 1980 | Kasturi | | Hindi | |
| 1980 | Albert Pinto Ko Gussa Kyoon Aata Hai | Albert's father | Hindi | |
| 1980 | Aakrosh | Dr. Vasant M. Patil | Hindi | |
| 1981 | Ek Duuje Ke Liye | Dr. Kundanlal | Hindi | |
| 1982 | Vijeta | | Hindi | |
| 1982 | Pyaar Ke Rahi | Sunder Swaroop | | |
| 1982 | Bhannat Bhanu | | | |
| 1982 | Bheegi Palkein | Janki Kishan Acharya | Hindi | |
| 1983 | Woh Saat Din | Anand's father | Hindi | |
| 1983 | Sadma | J. K. Malhotra | Hindi | |
| 1984 | Sasural | | | |
| 1984 | Duniya | Albert Pinto | Hindi | |
| 1984 | Tarang | Kalyan | Hindi | |
| 1984 | Mohan Joshi Hazir Ho! | Khandke | | |
| 1984 | Kanoon Kya Karega | Advocate Jaswant Lal | Hindi | |
| 1985 | Meraa Ghar Mere Bachche | J. S. Acharya | Hindi | |
| 1985 | Sanjog | Narayan's father | Hindi | |
| 1986 | Manav Hatya | Ramakrishna | Hindi | |
| 1986 | Sheesha | | Hindi | |
| 1987 | Sadak Chhap | Shankar's father | Hindi | |
| 1989 | Oonch Neech Beech | Doctor | | (final film role) |
