= Shiva (1990 film) =

- Promotional Poster
- Directed by: Ram Gopal Varma
- Written by: Ram Gopal Varma; Iqbal Durrani (dialogues)
- Based on: Siva by Ram Gopal Varma
- Produced by: Akkineni Venkat; Yarlagadda Surendra
- Starring: Nagarjuna; Amala; Raghuvaran; J. D. Chakravarthy
- Cinematography: S. Gopal Reddy
- Edited by: Shankar
- Music by: Ilaiyaraaja
- Production companies: Annapurna Studios; S. S. Creations
- Release date: 7 December 1990
- Running time: 161 minutes
- Country: India
- Language: Hindi

Shiva is a 1990 Indian Hindi language action drama film written and directed by Ram Gopal Varma. It is a remake of Varma's debut Telugu film Siva (1989). The film has Nagarjuna and Amala with Raghuvaran and J. D. Chakravarthy in lead roles. The success of the film led to Ram Gopal Varma directing a prequel in 2006.

== Plot ==
The film opens in a classroom in VAS College of Arts & Sciences. After the classes, upon the directions of a college student, JD, a bunch of goons led by Ganesh savagely assaults a group of students right outside the college gate. It's later made clear that JD was settling some campus scores and that the incident resulted in at least one student leaving the college, deepening the fear for JD on the campus.

It turns out that JD is the (unopposed) president of the college students' union and the leader of a notorious campus gang, powerful enough to prevent the college principal from taking disciplinary actions against their unsavory conduct, which includes eve-teasing and insulting professors. JD's connections, through Ganesh, reach a gangster named Bhavani Chaudhury, whose criminal network lends muscle to a local politician, Tilak Dhari.

Shiva is a new student at college. He joins a small group of friends, including Prakash and Asha. Shiva's confident gait and tough attitude leads to JD locking horns with him. An inevitable fight ensues, in which Shiva and friends beat up JD's gang in broad daylight within the campus. Emboldened by the incident, Shiva's friends plan to fight the students' union elections. Shiva proposes the nerdy friend Naresh to stand for the presidency. He also rebuffs Ganesh's initial warning to stay out of politics.

When Ganesh attempts to use force, Shiva beats him back too. The matter comes before Bhavani. Bhavani is mildly annoyed, but he studies Shiva as a potential replacement for JD. At his behest, Naresh is assaulted and rendered unable to run. At this point, Shiva accepts the nomination and decides to run.

Meanwhile, Bhavani has other troubles. He refuses to side with the worker's union leader, Krishna Rao. Krishna Rao takes his plight to Shiva who agrees to help in return for muscle, and Rao provides this by calling upon the workers. Around this time, Asha expresses a romantic interest in Shiva. The friendship progresses, and they eventually marry.

The stage is now set. Bhavani launches a set of sniper attacks on those close to Shiva. Shiva retaliates in kind and takes out many of Bhavani's leaders. Tilak Dhari notices that Shiva is launching a fitting response to Bhavani and decides to stop supporting him. Angered, humiliated, and defeated, Bhavani strikes Shiva's home and finds Asha. When he learns that Ganesh has already been presented in court and an arrest warrant has been issued for him, Bhavani kills Asha and Tilak Dhari for betrayal and leaves.

A final fight ensues in which eventually Shiva manages to kill Bhavani, ridding the city of one of its most terrifying anti-social elements, while personally coming to terms with the fact that he has lost almost everything in the bargain.

== Cast ==
- Nagarjuna as Shiva
- Amala as Asha Akhouri
- Raghuvaran as Bhavani Chaudhary
- J. D. Chakravarthy as Jagdish Dave "J.D."
- Paresh Rawal as Tilakdhari Azaad
- Tanikella Bharani as Nanaji
- Iftekhar as Principal
- Chandrashekhar as Lecturer
- Girija Shankar as Inspector Tejesh Akhouri
- Raj Zutshi as Prakash
- Ajit Vachani as Krishna Rao
- Goga Kapoor as Kanta Prasad
- Brij Gopal as Ganesh
- Dilip Dhawan as Shiva's Brother
- Chinna as Chotu
- Ramjagan as Naresh
- Brahmaji as Kanta Prasad's Driver
- Uttej as Yadagiri
- Rohini Hattangadi as Prakash's Mother
- Beena Banerjee as Shiva's Sister-In-Law
- Puri Jagannadh as Shiva's friend
- Baby Sushma as Keerthi

== Production ==
The college campus depicted in the film was shot at Acharya N.G. Ranga Agricultural University (formerly known as the State Agricultural University) in the Rajendranagar area of Hyderabad.

== Soundtrack ==
Shiva

Film score by Ilaiyaraaja
- Released: 1990
- Genre: Soundtrack
- Length: 18:32
- Label: Venus Cassettes
- Producer: Ilaiyaraaja

Ilaiyaraaja chronology
| Thoorpu Sindhooram (1990) | Shiva (1990) | Bobbili Raja (1990) |

Music was composed by Ilaiyaraaja. Lyrics were written by Majrooh Sultanpuri.

| Song | Singer |
|---|---|
| "Marte Hai" | Suresh Wadkar, Asha Bhosle |
| "Meri Qadar Jani" | Suresh Wadkar, S. Janaki |
| "Jagadi Jagadi Jagadi Jagadi Ja" ("Botany Chhodenge Matinee Dekhenge") | Udit Narayan, S. Janaki |
| "Anando Bramha Govindo Mahaar" | S. P. Balasubrahmanyam, Kavita Krishnamurthy |

== Reception ==
Nandini Ramnath of Scroll.in wrote "A vigilante thriller that has the fleetness of 1970s and ’80s Hollywood crime dramas, Shiva contains the key themes that would animate Varma’s later films – the protagonist who breaks the law to achieve his means, the antagonist with his posse of surly men, the urban setting with dangers lurking around the corner, the doomed romance with a virtuous woman-next door, the bursts of stylish brutality, and moral ambiguity".
