= Ardh Satya =

- Poster
- Directed by: Govind Nihalani
- Written by: Vasant Dev (dialogues)
- Screenplay by: Vijay Tendulkar
- Story by: S. D. Panvalkar
- Based on: Surya by S. D. Panvalkar
- Produced by: Manmohan Shetty; Pradeep Uppoor
- Starring: Om Puri; Smita Patil; Amrish Puri; Shafi Inamdar; Naseeruddin Shah; Sadashiv Amrapurkar
- Cinematography: Govind Nihalani
- Edited by: Renu Saluja
- Music by: Ajit Verman
- Release date: 19 August 1983 (India)
- Running time: 130 minutes
- Country: India
- Language: Hindi
- Budget: ₹15 lakh

Ardh Satya (lit. 'Half truth') is a 1983 Indian Hindi language action drama film directed by Govind Nihalani from a screenplay by Vijay Tendulkar. The film was based on the short story, Surya by S. D. Panvalkar, and featured dialogues by Vasant Dev.

In this acclaimed cop-drama, Anant Velankar, played by Om Puri, is a policeman struggling with the evils around him and with his own frailties. The film also stars Amrish Puri, Smita Patil, and Sadashiv Amrapurkar, and features a theme poem by the Marathi writer Dilip Chitre. The title of the film comes from a poem written by Chitre.

== Plot ==
The film opens at a party where Anant Welankar, a sub-inspector with Bombay police, meets Jyotsna Gokhale, a lecturer in literature at a local college. They seem to hit it off despite some initial skirmishing about ideology, and the friendship blossoms into a relationship.

Anant brings diligence, enthusiasm and a definite idealism to his job. But the job is harsh. There is a deep nexus between the local mafia, the cops and the (corrupt) politicians. Honest himself, Anant falls among the lower rungs of the police hierarchy and has very limited scope of authority on the state of affairs in his area.

When Anant arrests three common thugs, he is asked to meet with their boss, Rama Shetty, a don in the local mafia. Anant refuses all of Shetty's attempts to get his men out or to entice Anant to join him. Shetty decides to watch over Anant.

Some time thereafter, a meek fellow from a local slum lodges a complaint about some ruffians who harass his wife. Anant finds them, locks them up, and administers a severe beating. As a fallout, the local MLA asks for Anant to be suspended.

Anant's boss, inspector Haider Ali, explains to a mystified Anant that the ruffians were the MLA's henchmen, providers of muscle during elections and political rallies. Anant is defiant with a clear conscience (he did nothing wrong) and ready to face a tribunal. Haider Ali explains that it will hardly get that far. Tribunals are either delayed indefinitely or rigged (by corrupt politicians), and suspension is a permanent black mark on one's record (for no other politician will be willing to deal with such a troublemaker).

Anant is initially baffled but goes along with Haider's plan to bring in Desai, a mediator or middle-man with connections in New Delhi, the "Centre" or national seat of power. Desai invokes higher powers to quietly cover up the matter. Anant's morals are shaken by this incident: He had to use means barely legal to uphold his righteous actions upon criminals.

Anant reflects upon his childhood. His father retired as a Faujdar (constable) in the village police force. His father was a hard and violent man, quick to slap or beat his wife on the slightest pretext. Anant recalls looking on and being powerless to intervene. When Anant graduates college, he expresses his desire to pursue higher education but is forced into joining the police force.

Things get interesting when Anant finds one of Shetty's goons, badly beaten, burnt, and left to die. Anant brings the man into the hospital and takes his statement, naming Shetty and others who inflicted this assault. Anant storms into Shetty's rooms to arrest him. But Shetty is unfazed. He makes a simple phone call to a high-ranking cop who immediately asks Anant to back off. Anant cites the context and the overwhelming evidence but is still ordered to step away. A consternated, resentful and hapless Anant leaves, feeling intensely humiliated.

Haider Ali explains yet again: Rama Shetty plans to run for city council in the upcoming municipal elections and simply cannot afford to let a petty matter distract his ambitions. Anant is horrified and enraged and takes to drinking. His relationship with Jyotsna suffers. He is distraught when he is sent to provide security cover for Shetty's campaign rallies.

He suffers another career setback when he leads an assault team to capture a dangerous bandit in the hills outside Mumbai, and the credit for the arrest is ultimately handed to another officer. His relationship deteriorates further and he takes to drinking fairly heavily. When Jyotsna confronts him, he confides in her.

Things go completely out of control one night soon after as a small-time thief, accused of stealing a radio, is brought into custody. Anant is very drunk, angry, and frustrated. He delivers a shocking and brutal beating to the thief – while continuing to drink – accusing him of "stealing the legitimate Rights of Others".

Not surprisingly, the thief succumbs to the excessive beating. The fallout leaves Anant suspended and facing charges of excessive force. Anant tries to approach Desai again, but Haider Ali backs off, saying the situation has become too hot for almost anyone. Haider Ali suggests, somewhat reluctantly, that perhaps the newly elected Rama Shetty can help.

After several days of deliberation, Anant decides to visit Rama Shetty in his betting den.

Rama Shetty receives Anant cordially, and invites him into his inner sanctum alone – possibly aware that this righteous cop is finally on his knees before him. He agrees to help him only if Anant, in return, joins forces with him. Anant breaks out of his 'impotent' torpor and, infuriated, in a stunning and violent move, strangles Rama Shetty.

The film ends with Anant turning himself in.

== Cast ==
- Om Puri as Sub-Inspector Anant Velankar
- Smita Patil as Jyotsna Gokhale
- Amrish Puri as Police Constable Velankar, Anant's father
- Madhuri Purandare as Anant's mother
- Naseeruddin Shah as Mike Lobo, suspended cop (cameo)
- Sadashiv Amrapurkar as Rama Shetty
- Madan Jain as Rama Shetty's son
- Shafi Inamdar as Police Inspector Hyder Ali
- Ila Arun as Sneha Vajpayee
- Satish Shah as Dacoit
- Achyut Potdar as Police Inspector Patil
- Akash Khurana as Khanna, mill manager
- Vijay Kashyap as Mill Union Leader
- K. K. Raina as restaurant owner
- Prabhakar Patankar as police officer Gupte
- Suresh Bhagwat as the complainant
- Shanta Gokhale as speaker at Lokshahi Hakka Samiti meeting

== Production ==
The film was financed by four producers, two of them processing laboratory owners, one a garment trader and the fourth an industrialist. In an interview with India Today, Nihalani said "Though it's still an uphill task to find backers, 10 years ago it wouldn't have been possible at all." Nihalani was looking for a new actor to play the role of Rama Shetty when writer Tendulkar convinced him to see the play of Amrapurkar. It was a Marathi play called "Hands Up".

== Awards ==
Year	Nominee / work	Award	Result
1983	Om Puri	Best Actor – Karlovy Vary International Film Festival	Won
1983	Om Puri	National Film Award for Best Actor	Won
1984	Om Puri	Filmfare Award for Best Actor	Nominated
1984	Manmohan Shetty, Pradeep Uppoor	Filmfare Award for Best Film	Won
1984	Govind Nihalani	Filmfare Award for Best Director	Won
1984	Sadashiv Amrapurkar	Filmfare Award for Best Supporting Actor	Won
1984	S.D. Panvalkar	Filmfare Award for Best Story	Won
1984	Vijay Tendulkar	Filmfare Award for Best Screenplay	Won
