= Gehrayee =

- Poster
- Directed by: Aruna-Vikas
- Written by: Vijay Tendulkar; Vikas Desai; Aruna Raje
- Produced by: N. B. Kamat
- Starring: Anant Nag, Padmini Kolhapure, Sriram Lagoo, Indrani Mukherjee
- Cinematography: Barun Mukherjee
- Edited by: Vikas Desai; Aruna Raje
- Music by: Laxmikant Pyarelal
- Release date: 13 February 1981 (India)
- Country: India
- Language: Hindi

Gehrayee (transl. Depth) is a 1980 Indian horror thriller film directed by Vikas Desai and Aruna Raje based on a script by Vijay Tendulkar, Desai and Raje, and starring Anant Nag, Padmini Kolhapure, Sriram Lagoo and Indrani Mukherjee with Amrish Puri in a guest appearance. The film was produced by N. B. Kamat.

== Plot ==
Chennabasappa is a successful manager of a reputed firm in Bangalore and lives with his devoted but docile wife Saroja, son Nandish and daughter Uma. Chennabasappa wants to build a house for his family in Bangalore and desperately needs money. He decides to sell his plantation spread across several acres in his ancestral village to a soap company. The plantation has been looked after by a very poor caretaker Baswa for many years who was Chennabasappa's loyal servant. Upon knowing Chennabasappa's intentions, Baswa becomes agitated as he considers Chennabasappa's act to be something close to the rape of one's mother. In his view, the piece of land is like one's mother (sign of fertility) that Chennabasappa sold for money.

Chennabasappa is a rationalist, who is more like an atheist and doesn't believe in anything that's beyond sensory perception. He is a hard-headed and bossy at both office and home. As the story progresses, we see Uma behaving strangely. She would speak something of Chennabasappa's unspeakable and totally unknown dark past. During one such revelation, the family members discover that Chennabasappa had seduced Baswa's wife while he was a teenager. Baswa's wife got pregnant and jumped into a well to save herself from shame.

Chennabasappa tries every medication and treatment that would bring Uma back to normal, but nothing works out. Unfortunately, the family also becomes the target of several fake exorcists, who start milking them with their evasive talks but do no good to hapless Uma. In one such instance, the family is fooled by a Tantrik Puttachari, who actually tries to rape Uma to resurrect his own devil. However, his plans fail when Nandish interrupts in between and saves Uma.

Finally the family finds peace in the hands of a mighty but sane Tantrik Shashtri, who discovers the roots of evil in Chennabasappa's house itself, a spell cast on a lemon and an ugly voodoo doll. Shashtri orders the soul inside Uma's body to reveal its identity and it is revealed that the unholy spirit was actually sent to Uma by a village Tantrik whom Baswa paid for this heinous act. Uma returns to normal after a few days.

A vengeful Nandish decides to fight Baswa and arrives at his ancestral village. He learns that Baswa died a few days earlier. Nandish begs a local Tantrik to help him meet Baswa's spirit to find answers to his questions.

== Cast ==
- Sriram Lagoo as Chennabassapa
- Indrani Mukherjee as Saroja
- Anant Nag as Nandu
- Padmini Kolhapure as Uma
- Ramkrishna as Rama
- Rita Bhaduri as Chenni
- Amrish Puri as Tantrik Puttachary
- Sudhir Dalvi as Tantrik
- Kumar Sahu as Sabi
- Suhas Bhalekar as Baswa

== Songs ==
1. "Rishte Bas Rishte Hote Hain" – Kishore Kumar
