= Shaque (film) =

1976 Indian film by Aruna-Vikas

- Directed by: Aruna-Vikas
- Written by: Vikas Desai (script); Haafiz (dialogue)
- Produced by: N.B.Kamat
- Starring: Vinod Khanna; Shabana Azmi; Utpal Dutt
- Cinematography: Apurba Kishore Bir
- Edited by: Aruna-Vikas
- Music by: Vasant Desai
- Release date: 1976
- Running time: 121 minutes
- Country: India
- Language: Hindi

Shaque (English: Suspicion) is a 1976 Bollywood drama film directed by Aruna-Vikas. The film stars Vinod Khanna, Shabana Azmi and Utpal Dutt.

== Plot ==
Vinod Joshi lives a middle-class existence with his wife, Meena, and a young son. He would like to improve upon his living conditions and ensure that his child enjoys life thoroughly. One day Vinod returns home in a bloodied state, and tells Meena that there has been a homicide at his place of work, and a large amount of money has been stolen. The police are called in to investigate, and as a result a fellow-employee by the name of Subramaniam is arrested and sentenced to jail. Then the Joshi family gets wealthy all of a sudden, and move to a different and more spacious location, and start enjoying their lives to the fullest. Meena finds out that another co-worker of Vinod's, Maan Singh, has been telling people that Vinod was the one who stole the money, and also killed the employee in the process. Meena goes to meet Maan Singh to confirm this, and he does so, and even writes a letter to her to that effect, and threatens to inform the police. When Meena confronts Vinod, he vehemently denies ever stealing nor killing anyone, but has no explanation to offer for their new-found wealth. As Meena attempts to trace the origin of this wealth, and gets more and more convinced about his guilt, she and Vinod finds themselves growing further apart from each other, and Meena coming to the shocking conclusion that she has been sleeping with someone who may have killed another human being. Then Maan Singh's girlfriend, Rosita, is killed. The police find Vinod's fingerprints on the knife. Upon seeing the police, Vinod asks Meena to get ready to run, which they do, with the police in hot chase after them. How long will Vinod continue to elude the police? Did he really commit those murders?

== Cast ==
- Vinod Khanna as Vinod Joshi
- Shabana Azmi as Meena Joshi
- Utpal Dutt as Maan Singh
- Bindu as Rosita
- Durga Khote as Mrs. Banerjee in guest appearance
- Farida Jalal as Mrs. Subramaniam in guest appearance
- Arvind Deshpande as Subramaniam
- Suhas Bhalekar as Bhalekar
- Atul Varadhachary as Mithu, Vinod and Meena's son
- Satya Kumar Patil as Police Inspector
- J.K.Banerjee as Mr Banerjee aka Kakaji

Also featuring in the supporting cast :- Nirmala Mathan, Onkar, Ninad Deshpande, Sunita, Ramji Koli, Padmakar Athavale, Balmukund Prabhu and Gopal Nair.

== Awards ==
25th Filmfare Awards:

Nominated

- Best Actor – Vinod Khanna
- Best Supporting Actress – Farida Jalal
- Best Supporting Actor - Atul Varadhachary

== Soundtrack ==
#	Song	Singer/s
1	"Ek Dil Hai Ek Jaan Hai"	Mohammed Rafi, Asha Bhosle
2	"Megha Barasne Laga Hai Aaj Ki Raat"	Asha Bhosle
3	"Ye Kaha Aa Gayi Main"	Asha Bhosle
4	"Do Nainon Ke Pankh Lagakar"	Kumari Faiyaz
5	"Abhi Na Parda Giraao Thahro"	J.K. Banerjee
