= Rohini Hattangadi =

Indian actress

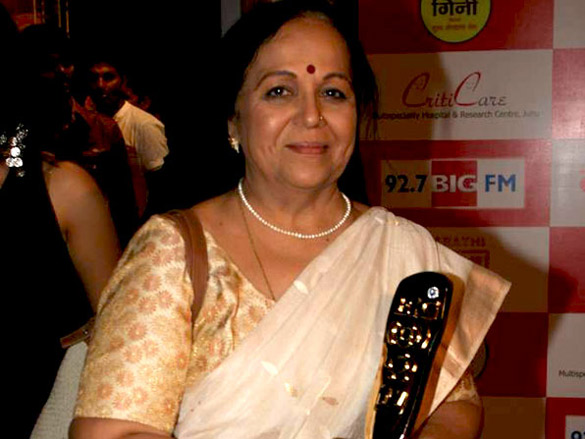
- Hattangadi in 2010
- Born: Rohini Oak; 11 April 1951 (age 75); Pune, Bombay State, India
- Years active: 1975–present
- Spouse: Jayadev Hattangadi (m. 1977; died 2008)
- Children: Aseem Hattangadi (son)

Rohini Hattangadi (née Oak; born 11 April 1951) is an Indian actress, known for her work in films in many languages including Marathi, Hindi, Telugu, Tamil, Kannada, Malayalam, and Gujarati, and in Marathi soap operas and theatre. She has won two Filmfare Awards, one National Film Award, and is the only Indian actress to win the BAFTA Award for Best Actress in a Supporting Role for her performance as Kasturba Gandhi in Gandhi (1982).

An alumna of the National School of Drama of New Delhi, Hattangadi had worked mainly in theatre when she made her movie debut with Arvind Desai Ki Ajeeb Dastaan in 1978. Some of her noted cinematic roles were in such art films as Arth (1982), Party and Saaransh (1984).

Hattangadi was mostly offered character roles in mainstream Hindi cinema after her portrayal in Gandhi, often typecast in mother roles much ahead of her years. Respected for her acting prowess, she has appeared in over 80 feature films, and is active in theatre and television.

== Early and personal life ==
Hattangadi was born in Pune as Rohini Oak. She attended Renuka Swaroop Memorial Girls High School, Pune.

She joined the National School of Drama (NSD) of New Delhi in 1971. Although the Film and Television Institute of India (FTII) was located in her hometown Pune, she did not join it because she was mainly interested in theatre and did not have early plans to enter cinema: "I just wanted to be an actor... My heart was in theatre because I learnt from my father (Anant Oak) that real acting is learnt through theatre. That's why I came all the way to Delhi to join NSD." At NSD, she met her future husband Jayadev Hattangadi, who was in the same batch as hers. They were trained together by Ebrahim Alkazi. Upon graduation in 1974, Rohini was awarded the Best Actress award and an award for Best all-round student, while Jayadev, who was being trained in direction, won the Best Director award. Jayadev and Rohini married the following year in 1975. Rohini also received training in Indian classical dance forms, Kathakali and Bharatnatyam for more than eight years, under the guidance of Professor Surendra Wadgaonkar.

Rohini and Jayadev have a son, Aseem Hattangadi, who is a theatre actor and acted in Badal Sircar's play, Evam Indrajit, directed by his father. Jaydev Hattangadi died on 5 December 2008, aged 60, after a battle with cancer.

== Career ==
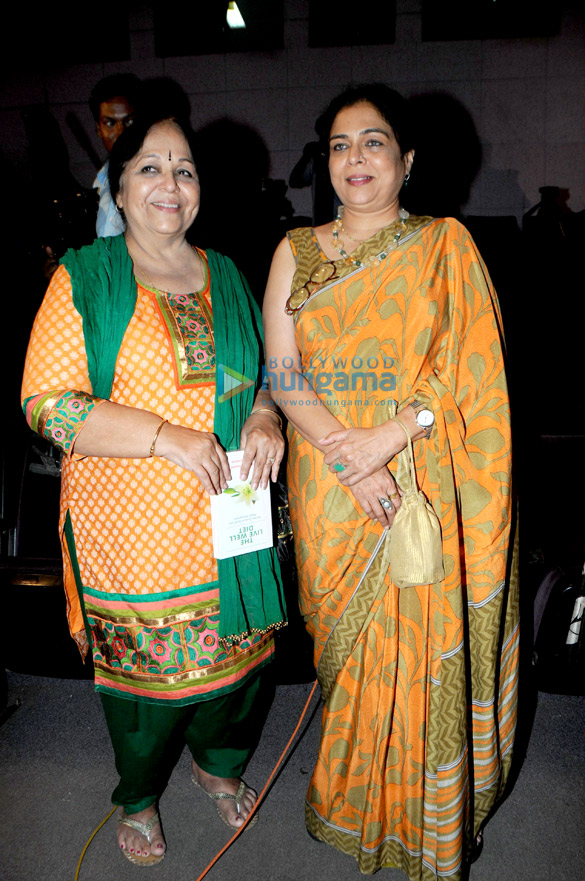
Hattangadi with Reema Lagoo.

=== Theatre ===
Rohini started her career with Marathi stage. Once in Mumbai while still at NSD, Jayadev and Rohini started a Marathi theatre group in Mumbai, called "Awishkar", which went on to produce over 150 plays. In 1975 she won the Best Actress Award at the Maharashtra State Drama Festival, for her performance in Changuna, a Marathi adaptation of Federico García Lorca's Spanish classic Yerma. The play was produced by "Awishkar" in Mumbai.

Hattangadi is the first woman to act in Kannada play Yakshagana, a folk play directed by K. Shivaram Karanth, and is the first woman in Asia to act in a Japanese Kabuki play, Ibaragi, directed by Shozo Sato, a Japanese director.

One play that Hattangadi was particularly appreciated for is Aparajita, based on a Bengali story by Nitin Sen. First staged in 1999, this 120-minute long solo-act play has over the years been performed in both Hindi and Marathi. Incidentally, it was her first performance in a long time to be directed by her husband, Jayadev Hattangadi. In all she has performed in five plays directed by him, including Medea, a Greek tragedy written by Euripides.

Her other theatre credits include Vijay Tendulkar's Mitra Chi Gosht, directed by Vinay Apte, Hori based on Premchand's Godaan, produced by IPTA, and most recently in the Hindi play Kohra with Sudha Chandran and Babul Bhavsar.

Hattangadi, along with husband Jayadev, ran "Kalashray", a centre for research, education in arts and talent encouragement in Mumbai, working with the underprivileged and developing tools for powerful communication. She won the 2004 Sangeet Natak Akademi Award for her contribution to Indian theatre.

=== Film ===
Hattangadi made her film debut with Saeed Akhtar Mirza's Arvind Desai Ki Ajeeb Dastaan in 1978. The film won the Filmfare Critics Award for Best Movie. This was followed by her appearance in Mirza's next picture, Albert Pinto Ko Gussa Kyon Ata Hai (1980), which won the same award, and Rabindra Dharmaraj's drama Chakra (1981). Her characters in these films were minor.

Her next film was Richard Attenborough's biographical film Gandhi (1982), based on the life of Mahatma Gandhi. She played Kasturba Gandhi, the wife of Mahatma, played by Ben Kingsley. The film was a major critical success, and among other awards won the Academy Award for Best Picture. Hattangadi's performance garnered her international recognition and she won the BAFTA Award for Best Actress in a Supporting Role in 1983, the only Asian to do that so far.

Despite the success she received for her role in Gandhi, the film was also credited with increasing "her screen age manifold". She was 27 when she played the middle-aged Kasturba, and from then on was offered roles of women of this age group. Hattangadi told of an instance when James Ivory wanted to cast for his film Heat and Dust, but he was surprised by how young she was when he met her and ultimately did not approach her for a part because he did not want to use make-up. Although theatre was her main interest, she stated that it was not enough financially, stating, "I realised that theatre won't be enough to make ends meet."

This was followed, however, by a string of acclaimed performances, starting with Mahesh Bhatt's Arth (1982), which won her the Filmfare Award for Best Supporting Actress. In 1984 she acted in Govind Nihalani's satirical drama Party (1984) for which she received the National Film Award for Best Supporting Actress. She followed it with two films in which she portrayed aging housewives, Mohan Joshi Hazir Ho! and Saaransh, both released in 1984. In Saaransh, she was the female lead along with Anupam Kher in his debut role. The film starred Hattangadi and Kher as B.V. and Parvati, an elderly couple struggling with the recent death of their son. Both Kher and Hattangadi were at their late 20s at the time, and The Tribune described them as giving "immortal performances". Her portrayal earned her a nomination for the Filmfare Award for Best Actress, but it further consolidated her image as a mother and by this time she was type-cast in Hindi commercial cinema in motherly roles.

She was later recognised for her small part in N. Chandra's Pratighaat (1987), and for her comic performances in Pankaj Parashar's ChaalBaaz and Ladaai, both released in 1989. She played the role of Sribaby, a drug kingpin, in Parashar's Jalwa (1987). It was in Indian parallel cinema, however, where she was offered demanding roles. Her films of this period include Govind Nihalani's Aghaat (1985), with Muzaffar Ali's Anjuman (1986) and Girish Kasaravalli's Mane and Ek Ghar (1991).

In 1990, she was again cast as the aging mother of Amitabh Bachchan in Agneepath, for which she was awarded her second Filmfare Award in the Best Supporting Actress category. Throughout the 1990s and the 2000s, she was cast by Rajkumar Santoshi in several of his films, such as Damini (1993), Ghatak: Lethal (1996) and Pukar (2000).

In 1995, she was cast alongside Mohanlal in the Malayalam film Agnidevan. In the film, she played a Jnanpith winning author and the matriarch of a joint family that runs a leading regional newspaper.

Her performance in Rajkumar Hirani's directorial debut Munnabhai MBBS (2003) received positive reactions, and she later reprised her role in the Tamil version of the film, Vasool Raja MBBS (2004).

She also worked in the Marathi film Mumbai Pune Mumbai 3 (2018) in the role of Shubhhu Mavshi.

=== Television ===
Some of her television performances include Vimla Pandey of Mahayagya, the role of a Hindustani classical singer in Yeh Kahaan Aa Gaye Hum, a committed social worker in Intehaan and the unlettered and harassed Sakkubai in Hindustani.

Hattangadi played lead roles in the Marathi serials Char Divas Sasuche and Vahinisaheb on ETV Marathi and Zee Marathi, respectively. She has played a parallel lead role in Marathi serial Honar Soon Mi Hya Gharchi on Zee Marathi. She played the lead role in a series on politics in India, where she played the leader of a major political party. In Hindi, She played the role of an actress in Ghar Ki Lakshmi Betiyann as Gayatri Baa. Over the years, she has been seen in a number of TV serials including Mahayagya, Thoda Hai Thode Ki Zaroorat Hai, Teache, Maayke Se Bandhi Dor and more. She played a special appearance in Chhal — Sheh Aur Maat, which aired in the TV channel Colors TV. She played a mother-in-law in Tuza Maza Breakup. She is also seen as Kashibai in the Marathi serial Swamini produced by Viren Pradhan on Colors Marathi.

In November 2025, Hattangadi announced her retirement from television serials.

=== Web series ===
In 2022, Rohini Hattangadi portrayed Kasturba Gandhi in the Gujarati web series Kalyanmurti Shrimadji Ni Jivangatha, alongside Deepak Antani, who played Mahatma Gandhi. The series was released on the 1 OTT YouTube channel.

== Filmography ==
Key
†	Denotes films that have not yet been released

=== Films ===
Year	Title	Role	Language	Notes
1978	Arvind Desai Ki Ajeeb Dastaan	Shilpa	Hindi	
1980	Albert Pinto Ko Gussa Kyon Ata Hai	Vivek's wife	Hindi	
1981	Chakra	Laxmi	Hindi	
1982	Gandhi	Kasturba Gandhi	English	Won – BAFTA Award for Best Actress in a Supporting Role
1982	Arth	Pooja's Maid	Hindi	Won – Filmfare Award for Best Supporting Actress
1983	Kaise Kaise Log	Durga	Hindi	
1984	Asambhava	Bhadra	Hindi	
1984	Saaransh	Parvati Pradhan	Hindi	Nominated – Filmfare Award for Best Actress
1984	Bhavna	Shobha	Hindi	Nominated – Filmfare Award for Best Supporting Actress
1984	Haisiyat	Shanta	Hindi	
1984	Lorie	Sharda Malhotra	Hindi	
1984	Party	Mohini Barve	Hindi	Won – National Film Award for Best Supporting Actress
1984	Mohan Joshi Hazir Ho!	Defense lawyer	Hindi	
1984	Hum Do Hamare Do	Sima	Hindi	
1984	Zakhmi Sher	Annapoorna Singh	Hindi	
1984	Tarang	Anita	Hindi	
1984	Insaaf Kaun Karega	Laxmi	Hindi	
1985	Aghaat	Mrs. Ali	Hindi	
1985	Anantyatra	Nirmala Godbole	Hindi	
1986	Surya		Kannada	
1986	Dharm Adhikari	Savitri	Hindi	
1986	Anjuman	Dr. Suchitra Sharma	Hindi	
1987	Achuvettante Veedu	Rukmini Kunjamma	Malayalam	
1987	Pratighaat	Durga	Hindi	
1987	Jalwa	Sree Baby	Hindi	
1987	Thikana	Mrs. Goel	Hindi	
1988	Shahenshah	Shanti Shrivastav	Hindi	
1988	Hero Hiralal	Roopa's step-mom	Hindi	
1988	Akarshan	Didi	Hindi	
1988	Tamacha	Laxmi Singh	Hindi	
1988	Shukriyaa	Yeshwanti	Hindi	
1988	Rukhsat	Sapna's aunt	Hindi	
1988	Andha Yudh	Shalini	Hindi	
1988	Aaj Ke Angaare	Sonia's mother	Hindi	
1989	Gair Kanooni	Devi Khanna	Hindi	
1989	Billoo Badshah	Billu's mother	Hindi	
1989	Ladaai	Mrs. Shanti Sharma	Hindi	
1989	ChaalBaaz	Amba	Hindi	
1989	Shiva	Prakash's mother	Hindi	
1989	Mane	Shekhar's aunt	Hindi	
1989	Indira	Bharti	Hindi	
1990	Agneepath	Suhasini Chauhan	Hindi	Won – Filmfare Award for Best Supporting Actress
1990	Siva	Prakash's Mother	Hindi	
1990	Amiri Garibi	Sheila Kedarnath	Hindi	
1990	Kroadh	Mrs. Shukla	Hindi	
1990	Hum Se Na Takrana	Ganga	Hindi	
1990	Sher Dil	Mayadevi Saxena	Hindi	
1990	Kanoon Ki Zanjeer	Subhadra	Hindi	
1991	Ek Ghar	Raj's aunt	Hindi	
1991	Pyar Ka Saudagar	Maria's mother	Hindi	
1991	Benaam Badsha	Kamleshwari	Hindi	
1991	Kurbaan	Kakimaa	Hindi	
1991	Dharam Sankat	Durga Devi	Hindi	
1991	Yaara Dildara	Shanti Mehra	Hindi	
1991	Lakshmanrekha	Shanti Sharma	Hindi	
1991	Sitaramayyagari Manavaralu	Janakamma, wife of Sitarammayya	Telugu	
1992	Raatri	Shalini Sharma	Telugu	
1992	Raat	Shalini Sharma	Hindi	
1992	Dr. Ambedkar	Durgabai Deshmukh	Hindi	
1993	Damini	Mrs. Sumitra Gupta	Hindi	
1993	Bhookamp	Mrs. D'Sa	Hindi	
1993	Kaise Kaise Rishte	Ravi's mother	Hindi	
1993	Baarish	College Principal	Hindi	
1994	Teerpu	Parvathi	Telugu	
1994	Bhale Pellam		Telugu	
1995	Top Hero	Amma	Telugu	
1995	Agnidevan	Aniyankuttan's Grand mother	Malayalam	
1995	Jawab	Mrs. Lucy Kumar	Hindi	
1995	Veergati	Shanta	Hindi	
1995	Akele Hum Akele Tum	Mrs. Dayal	Hindi	
1995	The Gambler	Mrs. Pandey	Hindi	
1995	Ab Insaf Hoga	Judge	Hindi	
1995	Sukhi Mansachi 12 Sutre	Rohini	Marathi	
1996	Little Soldiers	Rajeswari Devi	Telugu	
1996	Ghatak	Savitri	Hindi	
1996	Krishna	Sunil's mother	Hindi	
1996	Daanveer	Shanti's mother	Hindi	
1996	Ram Aur Shyam	Mrs. Raman	Hindi	
1997	Tunnu Ki Tina	Tunnu's mother	Hindi	
1997	Qahar	Krishna's mother	Hindi	
1997	Krishna Arjun	Sharda Yadav	Hindi	
1998	Sham Ghanshyam	Kaushalya Bhim Singh	Hindi	
1998	Hafta Vasuli	Kamla Chauhan	Hindi	
1998	Kabhi Na Kabhi	Tina's aunt	Hindi	
1998	Mohabbat Aur Jung	Pratima	Hindi	
1999	Lohpurush	Chief Minister Gayatri Devi	Hindi	
1999	Jaanam Samjha Karo	Shanti	Hindi	
2000	Pukar	Mrs. Mallapa (Pooja's mother)	Hindi	
2001	Lajja	Mrs. Hazarilal	Hindi	
2001	Avgat	Ramya's mother	Hindi	
2002	Badhaai Ho Badhaai	Rosy D'Souza	Hindi	
2003	Munna Bhai M.B.B.S.	Parvati Sharma	Hindi	
2004	Vasool Raja M.B.B.S.	Kasturi Venkataraman	Tamil	
2005	Davbindu	Dr. Amar's mother	Marathi	
2006	Devashappath Khota Sangen	Gauri Dolas	Marathi	
2008	Karzzzz	Shanta Prasad Verma	Hindi	
2009	Ganesh Just Ganesh	Divya's aunt	Telugu	
2012	Shirdi Sai	Ganga Bai	Telugu	
2013	Seethamma Vakitlo Sirimalle Chettu	Bondam/Bamma	Telugu	
2013	Ramayya Vasthavayya	Baby	Telugu	
2013	David	Malati Tai	Hindi/Tamil	
2013	Premachi Goshta	Ram's Mother	Marathi	
2014	Veeram	Koppenrundevi	Tamil	
2014	Lekar Hum Deewana Dil	Judge	Hindi	
2015	Mango Dreams	Padma	English	
2016	Brahmotsavam	Mahalakshmi's stepmother	Telugu	
2017	Sarkar 3	Rukkubai	Hindi	
2018	Chal Mohan Ranga	Saroja	Telugu	
2018	Oxygen	Maa	Gujarati	
2018	Mumbai Pune Mumbai 3	Dr. Subbu Mavshi	Marathi	
2019	Chitralahari	Judge	Telugu	
2019	Kolaiyuthir Kaalam	Cook	Tamil	
2019	Once More	Anjali's grandmother	Marathi	
2019	Mai Gayatri Jadhav	Judge	Marathi	
2022	Jalsa	Rukmimi	Hindi	
2022	Rashtra	Aaisaheb	Marathi	
2022	Respect	Mrs. Pandit	Marathi	
2023	Kisi Ka Bhai Kisi Ki Jaan	Gundamaneni Pushpanjali	Hindi	
2023	Baipan Bhaari Deva	Jaya	Marathi	
2023	Operation Fryday	Taayee	Hindi	
2023	Error 500	Janaki	Hindi	
2023	Family Politics of Blood	Vasanti	Hindi	
2024	Aata Vel Zaali	Ranjana Lele	Marathi	
2024	The Family Star	Govardhan's grandmother	Telugu	
2025	Ata Thambaycha Naay!	Uday Kumar's Mother	Marathi	
2025	Aatli Baatmi Futli	Savita Wankhede	Marathi	
2026	Gandhi Talks	Boseman's mother	Marathi	
2026	Maya	Amu	Marathi	
2026	Super Duperr	Judge	Marathi	Special appearance
2026	Jayanti 2	Principal Saraswati Tilak	Marathi	
2026	Meethe Mein Kya Hai	Jai’s grandmother	Hindi	

=== Television ===
Year	Title	Role	Language
1986	Chhoti Badi Batein		Hindi
1987-1988	Ganadevta		Hindi
1997-1999	Thoda Hai Thode Ki Zaroorat Hai		Hindi
1998	Mahayagya	Vimla	Hindi
1999	Muskaan	Rahul's mother	Hindi
2001–2013	Char Divas Sasuche	Ashalata Deshmukh	Marathi
2009	Vahinisaheb	Shalini Bhosale	Marathi
2009	Ghar Ki Lakshmi Betiyann	Gayatri	Hindi
2011	Maayke Se Bandhi Dor	Lata	Hindi
2012	Chhal — Sheh Aur Maat	Astrologer	Hindi
2013-2016	Honar Soon Mi Hya Gharchi	Bhagirathi Gokhale (Aai Aaji)	Marathi
2017-2018	Tuza Maza Breakup	Aaji	Marathi
2020-2021	Doctor Don	Snehlata	Marathi
2020-2021	Sukhi Mansacha Sadara	Hansa	Marathi
2021	Moti Baa Ni Nani Vahu	Kaki Baa	Gujarati
2023	Yashoda – Goshta Shyamchya Aaichi	Rukmini Parchure	Marathi
2025–present	Tharala Tar Mag!	Purna Aaji	Marathi

== Marathi play career ==
Rohini Hattangadi has played a number of roles in Marathi and Hindi plays in her career. Some of the most popular plays are Aai Tula Mi Kuthe Theu and Charchaughi.

== Accolades ==
Year	Award	Work	Category	Result
1983	BAFTA Awards	Gandhi	Best Actress in a Supporting Role	Won (Note: Tied with Maureen Stapleton for Reds.)
1984	National Film Awards	Party	Best Supporting Actress	Won
1984	Filmfare Awards	Arth	Best Supporting Actress	Won
1985	Filmfare Awards	Saaransh	Best Actress	Nominated
1985	Filmfare Awards	Bhavna	Best Supporting Actress	Nominated
1991	Filmfare Awards	Agneepath	Best Supporting Actress	Won
2001	Screen Awards	Pukar	Best Comedian	Nominated
2004	Sangeet Natak Akademi Award			Honoured
2024	Maharashtra State Film Awards	Vitthal Smruti Special Contribution Award		Honoured
