= Bhairavi (film) =

- Directed by: Aruna Raje
- Starring: Ashwini Bhave; Sridhar
- Music by: Laxmikant-Pyarelal
- Release date: 1996
- Country: India
- Language: Hindi

Bhairavi is a 1996 Indian Hindi-language romantic film directed by Aruna Raje starring Ashwini Bhave and Sridhar. The film won the National Film Award for Best Lyrics.

== Plot ==
Ragini is a blind, but talented young woman, well versed in all household chores, and a golden voice. She lives with her mother Radha who is anxious to get her married. After the death of her parents, she is left to fend for herself, until Rajan Swamy enters and changes her life.

== Cast ==
- Ashwini Bhave as Ragini Sridhar
- Sridhar as Rajan Swamy
- Sulabha Deshpande
- Manohar Singh

== Music ==
1. " Ab Ke Saawan Mein" – Kavita Krishnamurthy
2. "Balam Kesariya" – Udit Narayan, Kavita Krishnamurthy
3. "Beech Bhanwar Se" – Kavita Krishnamurthy
4. "Chal Ri Pawan" – Kavita Krishnamurthy
5. "Kuchh Is Tarah" – Udit Narayan, Kavita Krishnamurthy
6. "Moh Maya" – Roop Kumar Rathod
7. "Om Namah Shivay" – Roop Kumar Rathod, Kavita Krishnamurthy
