= Tum?: A Dangerous Obsession =

2004 film directed by Aruna Raje

- DVD cover
- Directed by: Aruna Raje
- Written by: Manisha Korde (dialogue); Aruna Raje (screenplay)
- Produced by: Ratan Jain
- Starring: Karan Nath; Manisha Koirala; Rajat Kapoor; Natanya Singh; Deepti Daryanani; Ramesh Tekwani
- Cinematography: Mahesh Aney
- Edited by: Aruna Raje
- Music by: Himesh Reshammiya
- Production company: Venus Movies
- Distributed by: Venus Movies
- Release date: 20 February 2004
- Country: India
- Language: Hindi
- Budget: ₹3.75 crore
- Box office: ₹4.32 crore

Tum?: A Dangerous Obsession is a 2004 Indian Hindi-language thriller film directed by Aruna Raje, it stars Karan Nath, Manisha Koirala and Rajat Kapoor.

== Plot ==
Kamini Gupta and Vinod Gupta with their two children are a happy family. Vinod, a CEO of a multinational corporation is very busy and has no time for the family. He is unable to make it to his wedding anniversary, leaving Kamini all alone. A young photographer, Jatin Pandey (Karan Nath) gives her company. He takes her pictures, also introduces to AD film Director Ramesh Tekwani for some AD shoots. they dine and dance together. In the morning when she wakes up, she finds herself naked in Jatin's bed. Jatin now craves and burns for Kamini who is the forbidden fruit in his life, leading from passion to a dangerous obsession. Towards the end Jatin is found murdered. Inspector Yusuf Malik (Aman Verma) takes the bizarre case. A murder trail with obsession and passion.

== Cast ==
- Manisha Koirala as Kamini Gupta, Vinod's wife
- Karan Nath as Jatin Pandey
- Rajat Kapoor as Vinod Gupta, Kamini's husband
- Natanya Singh as Isha Malhotra
- Aman Verma as Inspector Yusuf Malik

== Music ==
Tum - A Dangerous Obsession

Soundtrack album by Himesh Reshammiya
- Released: 20 February 2004 (India)
- Recorded: 2003
- Venue: Mumbai
- Genre: Feature film soundtrack
- Producer: Himesh Reshammiya

Himesh Reshammiya chronology
Zameen (2003)	Tum - A Dangerous Obsession (2004)	Bardaasht (2004)

1. Rehna To Hai (duet)- Kumar Sanu, Alka Yagnik
2. Rehna To Hai (solo)- Roop Kumar Rathod
3. Rehna To Hai (Film version)- Alka Yagnik, Roop Kumar Rathod
4. Kyun Mera Dil- Adnan Sami
5. Dil To Udne Laga- Shreya Ghoshal
6. Sangdil Sanam- Udit Narayan, Anuradha Sriram, Kunal Ganjawala
7. Mera Dil Laile- Shaan
