= Taxi-Taxie =

Taxi Taxie
- Directed by: Irshad
- Music by: Hemant Bhosle; Majrooh Sultanpuri (lyrics)
- Release date: 1977
- Country: India
- Language: Hindi

Taxi Taxie is a 1977 Bollywood film directed by Irshad.

In 1976, Martin Scorsese came up with Taxi Driver, a movie that went on to be viewed as one of the best films ever. Starring Robert De Niro, the movie garnered tremendous critical acclaim and emerged as a cult classic. Over the years many directors have been inspired by its style and the way it went about constructing a psychological study of a man leading a life shrouded by disturbing elements, or rather deconstructing the psychological state of disturbed man finding it difficult to come to terms with his environs.

In India, a man called Irshaad made a movie titled Taxi Taxie, casting Amol Palekar in the lead as a taxi driver operating in the metropolis of Mumbai. This movie that came out in 1977 seems to be clearly inspired by the English classic that released a year before. The director/writer has been influenced by the idea of his famous contemporary from the west, and has created a completely different movie and completely different narrative of his own, which is quite unique.

I see Amol Palekar, known as "Hero" among his fellow taxi drivers in Mumbai as an honest man who spends most of his time driving passengers around the city. Despite Amol Palekar’s qualifications Amol Palekar struggles with memories of his past. When Amol Palekar unexpectedly meets a college friend, Amol Palekar’s decision to become a taxi driver raises questions. Amol Palekar explains that interacting with passengers makes Amol Palekar feel connected, to people and helps Amol Palekar avoid loneliness. Amol Palekar also hopes that driving through Mumbai might bring Amol Palekar face‑to‑face with a woman Amol Palekar once loved. As Amol Palekar travels through the city Amol Palekar continues to look for the face Amol Palekar longs to see again.

Hero makes a friendship with a hearted prostitute he sees often. Hero also meets a struggling playback singer who reminds Hero of a woman Hero hopes to meet. Meanwhile Hero has a relationship with his Christian landlady who gives Hero another friend. Through all these relationships Heros feelings, thoughts and inner struggles appear bit, by bit.

The city of Mumbai plays a crucial role in binding the narrative. People who have been to Mumbai will find it interesting to see all their favourite places from the town being given prominence in the film (without pushing the main context to the background). The film appears technically sound in spite of the apparent low budget.

== Cast ==
- Amol Palekar ... Dev / Hero
- Zaheera ... Jyoti Sharma
- Reena Roy ... Neelam
- Rama Vij ... Prostitute
- Jalal Agha ... RV
- Anjali Paigankar
- Asha Bhosle ... Singer
- Aruna Irani ... Zarina
- Mehmood Jr.
- Lalita Pawar ... Mrs. D'Sa
- Tun Tun ... Mother of 9 children (as Tuntun)
- Dinesh Hingoo ... passenger in taxi

Banner : Radha Mohan Arts Produced By Mrs. Pari A. V. Mohan Directed by Irshad

== Soundtrack ==
The music of the film was composed by Hemant Bhosle, while lyrics were written by Majrooh Sultanpuri.

1. "Jeevan Mein Hum Safar" - Kishore Kumar & Rama Vij
2. "Humein To Aaj Isi Baat Par" - Asha Bhosle
3. "Layi Kahan Hai Zindagi" - Lata Mangeshkar, Asha Bhosle & Chorus
4. "Bhawron Ki Gun Gun" - Asha Bhosle
5. "Jeevan Mein Hum Safar (Sad)" - Kishore Kumar
6. Title Song (Instrumental)
