= Ajit Varman =

Indian composer (1947–2016)

- Born: Ajit Singh Varman; 26 March 1947
- Origin: Kolkata, West Bengal, India
- Died: 15 December 2016 (aged 69)
- Occupation: Music Director
- Years active: 1975- 2016

Ajit Singh Varman (26 March 1947 – 15 December 2016), sometimes also credited as Ajit Verman, was an Indian film music composer. He started his career in the 1960s as a musician for the likes of Satyajit Ray, Mrinal Sen, Pankaj Mullick and Salil Chowdhury in Calcutta (now Kolkata) as well as Shankar Jaikishan and Laxmikant Pyarelal in the 1970s in Mumbai (then Bombay) till 1975 when he decided to make the transition to full-time music direction.

He worked on Govind Nihalani's Aakrosh (1980), Vijeta (1982) and Ardh Satya (1983), besides two of Mahesh Bhatt's early classics Saaransh (1984) and Janam (1985).

== Filmography ==
- Aakrosh (1980)
- Vijeta (1982)
- Ardh Satya (1983)
- Saaransh (1984)
- Misaal (1985)
- Janam (1985, TV Movie)
- Andha Yudh (1987)
- Karm Yodha (1992)
- Imtihaan (1995, TV show)
- Mohini (1995, Background Score)

== Bibliography ==
- Limbacher, James L.; Wright, H. Stephen (1991). Keeping score: film and television music, 1980-1988. Scarecrow Press. ISBN 978-0-8108-2453-9.
- Banerjee, Srivastava (2013). One Hundred Indian Feature Films: An Annotated Filmography. Routledge. ISBN 978-1-135-84098-3.
