= Sazaye Maut =

Sazā-ye Maut
- Directed by: Vidhu Vinod Chopra
- Written by: Vidhu Vinod Chopra
- Produced by: Vidhu Vinod Chopra
- Starring: Naseeruddin Shah; Dilip Dhawan
- Cinematography: Virendra Saini; Anand Vardhan
- Edited by: Renu Saluja; Sudhir Mishra
- Music by: Vanraj Bhatia; Kersi Lord
- Release date: 1981
- Country: India
- Language: Hindi

Sazā-ye Maut (English: Death Penalty) is 1981 Indian film directed and produced by Vidhu Vinod Chopra. The films was based on Chopra's diploma film at FTII, Murder at Monkey Hill (1976). He adapted that into a full-length feature, with Naseeruddin Shah and Radha Saluja, respectively, playing the roles that he and Anjali Paigankar had played in the short film.

== Cast ==
- Naseeruddin Shah as Uday Jagirdar / Omkar Puri
- Radha Saluja as Malika Modi
- Naresh Suri as Baldev
- Anjan Srivastav as Uday's lawyer
- Francis Menezes as Mr. Modi
- Dilip Dhawan as Anil Suri

== Plot ==
Malika Modi lives a very wealthy lifestyle with her widowed dad in India where they own vast acres of land and businesses. When Mr. Modi suddenly passes away, he leaves all the business's interests with his younger brother conditionally until Malika turns 25. Shortly before she turned 25, Malika is told by a young man, Uday Jagirdar, that she is about to get killed, and the person to kill her is none other than Uday himself. Malika disbelieves him and runs for her life. She finds out that Uday is not chasing her but another man, Anil Suri, an employee of her uncle's. Malika knows now that she has no choice but to seek help from Uday, her very own paid assailant. What Malika does not know is that Uday is not who he claims to be, but is actually a deranged former mental patient who is accused of murder.
