= Saagar (1985 film) =

- Directed by: Ramesh Sippy
- Written by: Javed Akhtar
- Produced by: G. P. Sippy
- Starring: Rishi Kapoor; Kamal Haasan; Dimple Kapadia; Nadira; Saeed Jaffrey; Satish Kaushik
- Cinematography: S.M. Anwar
- Edited by: M. S. Shinde
- Music by: R. D. Burman
- Production company: Sippy Films
- Release date: 9 August 1985
- Running time: 187 minutes
- Country: India
- Language: Hindi

Saagar (transl. Sea) is a 1985 Indian Hindi-language musical romantic drama film directed by Ramesh Sippy. The film stars Rishi Kapoor, Kamal Haasan, Dimple Kapadia (in her comeback feature) and Lissy in lead roles. The film featured lyrics, story and screenplay written by Javed Akhtar and music by R. D. Burman.

Released on 9 August 1985, Saagar was a moderate success at the box office and one of the highest-grossing films of the year. It gained recognition over the years through reruns on television channels.

At the 33rd Filmfare Awards, Saagar received a leading 10 nominations, including Best Film, Best Director (Sippy), Best Supporting Actor (Hassan), Best Supporting Actress (Madhur Jaffrey), and won 4 awards, including Best Actor (Hassan), Best Actress (Kapadia) and Best Male Playback Singer (Kishore Kumar for "Saagar Kinare"). At the ceremony, Hassan was nominated for both Best Actor and Best Supporting Actor for his performance in the film, eventually winning the former, his first and only win in the category.

== Plot ==
Mona (Dimple Kapadia) runs a small restaurant in Goa. Raja (Kamal Haasan), who lives close by, is a good friend. He is in love with her but is unable to profess his feelings. Ravi (Rishi Kapoor) is from a rich industrialist family who moves to Goa from the USA. Mona and Ravi fall in love of which Raja knows nothing. Ravi's grandmother, Kamladevi (Madhur Jaffrey), is opposed to their love because of class differences. In the end, Raja sacrifices his love and life for Mona and Ravi.

== Cast ==
- Rishi Kapoor as Ravi
- Kamal Haasan as Raja
- Dimple Kapadia as Mona D'Silva
- Nadira as Miss Joseph
- Saeed Jaffrey as Mr. D'Silva
- Madhur Jaffrey as Kamladevi, Ravi's grandmother
- Lissy as Rosy, Raja's fiancé
- A. K. Hangal as Baba (in the lighthouse)
- Sharat Saxena as Tatya, fisherman
- Shafi Inamdar as Vikram
- Satish Kaushik as Batuk Laal
- Kiran Vairale as Maria
- Lilliput as Cheena
- Goga Kapoor as Thekedaar
- Balu Gaikwad as Bhikari

== Soundtrack ==
Saagar

Soundtrack album by R. D. Burman
- Released: 1985
- Genre: Feature film soundtrack
- Language: Hindi
- Label: Music India Ltd.
- Producer: R. D. Burman
External audio
- Audio Jukebox on YouTube

The music was composed by R. D. Burman and the lyrics were by Javed Akhtar. Kishore Kumar bagged his 8th Filmfare Award for the song "Sagar Kinare", Other singers include Lata Mangeshkar, Asha Bhosle, S. P. Balasubrahmanyam & Shailendra Singh.

R. D. Burman for song "Saagar Kinare" used one of his old song tune "Hume Raaston Ki Zaroorat Nahin Hai" from film Naram Garam released in 1981.

The song Jaane Do Na was recreated by composer Arko Pravo Mukherjee for the 2015 film Kuch Kuch Locha Hai.

The song Sach Mere Yaar Hai was reused in the 2021 TV Series The Family Man Season 2, as a tribute to the singer S. P. Balasubrahmanyam and to the fictional NIA agent character Millind in the series.

No.	Title	Lyrics	Singer(s)	Length
1.	"Saagar Kinare"	Javed Akhtar	Kishore Kumar, Lata Mangeshkar
2.	"Chehra Hai Ya Chand Khila Hai" (Saagar Jaisi Aankhonwali)	Javed Akhtar	Kishore Kumar
3.	"Yunhi Gate Raho"	Javed Akhtar	Kishore Kumar, S. P. Balasubrahmanyam
4.	"O Maria"	Javed Akhtar	Asha Bhosle, S. P. Balasubrahmanyam
5.	"Saagar Kinare" (Sad)	Javed Akhtar	Lata Mangeshkar
6.	"Sach Mere Yaar Hai"	Javed Akhtar	S. P. Balasubrahmanyam
7.	"Jaane Do Naa"	Javed Akhtar	Asha Bhosle, Shailendra Singh

== Release ==
Saagar was released on 9 August 1985. Apart from receiving critical acclaim, the movie was a major box office success. It gained recognition over the years through re-runs on television channels and is now regarded as a classic and a cult film. In 2015, Saagar was screened at the Habitat Film Festival.

=== Critical reception ===
According to Asiaweek, "Saagar offers a skimpy eternal-triangle plot, but it is remarkable for its polished narration and masterly technique. The romance is subdued, symbolised by waves gently caressing the shore." It further praised the performances, calling Kapadia "a delight" and claiming that Hassan "steals the show with his subtle performance," and the direction by Sippy, who "has succeeded in injecting vitality, beauty and deep insight into a gossamer-thin story." India Today wrote, "Like Sholay, and only like Sholay, Saagar is purely a director's film."

== Awards ==
List of awards and nominations
Ceremony	Category	Nominee(s)	Result	Ref.
33rd Filmfare Awards (1986)	Best Film	G. P. Sippy	Nominated	
33rd Filmfare Awards (1986)	Best Director	Ramesh Sippy	Nominated	
33rd Filmfare Awards (1986)	Best Actress	Dimple Kapadia	Won	
33rd Filmfare Awards (1986)	Best Actor	Kamal Haasan	Won	
33rd Filmfare Awards (1986)	Best Supporting Actor	Kamal Haasan	Nominated	
33rd Filmfare Awards (1986)	Best Supporting Actress	Madhur Jaffrey	Nominated	
33rd Filmfare Awards (1986)	Best Music Director	R. D. Burman	Nominated	
33rd Filmfare Awards (1986)	Best Lyricist	Javed Akhtar for "Saagar Kinare"	Nominated	
33rd Filmfare Awards (1986)	Best Male Playback Singer	Kishore Kumar for "Saagar Kinare"	Won	
33rd Filmfare Awards (1986)	Best Cinematography	S. M. Anwar	Won	
1986 Bengal Film Journalists' Association Awards (BFJA Awards)	Best Supporting Actor	Kamal Haasan	Won	

== See also ==
- List of submissions to the 58th Academy Awards for Best Foreign Language Film
- List of Indian submissions for the Academy Award for Best International Feature Film
