= Raja Rani Ko Chahiye Pasina =

- Directed by: Sulabha Deshpande
- Starring: Suyash Singh Rajput, Keenu, Jasraj and Tripathi and Joshi
- Release date: 1978
- Country: India
- Language: Hindi

Raja Rani Ko Chahiye Pasina is a 1978 Bollywood film directed by Sulabha Deshpande. The film stars Sushant Ray, Durga, Jasraj.
