= Duniya (1984 film) =

- Poster
- Directed by: Ramesh Talwar
- Written by: Javed Akhtar (dialogue)
- Screenplay by: Javed Akhtar
- Produced by: Yash Johar
- Starring: Ashok Kumar; Dilip Kumar; Rishi Kapoor; Amrita Singh
- Cinematography: Jehangir Choudhary; Jal Mistry
- Edited by: Waman Bhonsle; Gurudutt Shirali
- Music by: R. D. Burman
- Production company: Dharma Productions
- Release date: 28 September 1984
- Country: India
- Language: Hindi

Duniya (transl. The World) is a 1984 Indian Hindi-language action film directed by Ramesh Talwar, starring Ashok Kumar, Dilip Kumar, Rishi Kapoor, Amrita Singh in lead roles. The music was composed by R. D. Burman. Saira Banu made a special appearance opposite her husband Dilip Kumar, marking her final film appearance and the last time they appeared together on screen.

== Plot ==
Mohan Kumar is an honest and conscientious man working as the General Manager of a shipping company owned by his friend, Dinesh. Dinesh is a widower and his daughter, Roma is attached to Mohan Kumar, his wife Sumitra and young son Ravi. Jugal Kishore, Bhandari and Balwant, who work under Mohan Kumar, are into smuggling. When Mohan Kumar learns of their activities, the three men murder Dinesh and deviously frame Mohan Kumar for it. Mohan Kumar is helpless. Unable to prove his innocence in court, he is sentenced to a 14-year jail term. Around the same time his wife gets killed in an accident.

After serving the jail term Mohan Kumar takes help from Puri whose life he had saved in prison, to take revenge on the three villains. Puri has connections with the underworld. While Mohan Kumar is also unable to trace his son Ravi, he comes across Roma who lives with her wayward uncle Jagdish, a mean alcoholic. Unknown to Mohan Kumar, his lost son Ravi has joined Jugal Kishore and his gang. By a turn of circumstances, Ravi meets Roma and saves the life of Mohan Kumar. Mohan Kumar feels an unexplained affection for Ravi. Roma and Ravi fall in love.

When Mohan Kumar plans Bhandari's death, Jugal Kishore and Balwant assign Ravi to kill Mohan Kumar. Unable to do so, Ravi falls off the roof and is ironically saved by Mohan Kumar. Kabir, one of Puri's henchmen finds Ravi's gun. Suspicious, he spies on Ravi and finds out his connection to JK and Balwant. Mohan Kumar is enraged.

Balwant tries to kill Mohan Kumar, but fails. Mohan Kumar chases him and hit by a truck, Balwant dies. Enraged by the deaths of Bhandari and Balwant, JK kidnaps Ravi and Roma. Having found out that Ravi is Mohan Kumar's son, he demands a huge ransom to release him. In the ensuing fight, Mohan and Ravi collaborate to get JK killed.

== Cast ==
- Ashok Kumar as R.D. Puri
- Dilip Kumar as Mohan Kumar
- Rishi Kapoor as Ravi Kumar
- Amrita Singh as Roma Verma
- Prem Chopra as Prakash Chandra Bhandari
- Amrish Puri as Balwant Singh Kalra
- Pran as Jugal Kishore Ahuja "J.K."
- Pradeep Kumar as Dinesh Verma
- Kulbhushan Kharbanda as Teja
- Om Puri as Vasudev
- Saira Banu as Sumitra Kumar
- Sulabha Deshpande as Mary
- Dhumal as Pascal
- Satyen Kappu as Jagdish
- Mac Mohan as Kabir
- Javed Khan Amrohi as Tony
- Arvind Deshpande as Albert Pinto
- Anjan Srivastav as Stranger
- Manik Irani as Manik
- Master Rinku as junior Ravi Kumar
- Punnapra Appachan as Police Inspector

== Soundtrack ==
Lyrics: Javed Akhtar

| Song | Singer |
|---|---|
| "Main Aur Meri Awaargi" | Kishore Kumar |
| "Duniya Bahut Hi Kamaal" | Kishore Kumar |
| "Chand Nagar Ki Shehzadi" | Kishore Kumar |
| "Gehre Halke Halke Gehre Chhaye Sham Ke Saaye" | Kishore Kumar, Lata Mangeshkar |
| "Jhumti Raat Jawan, Jagmagata Hai Jahan, Do Ghadi Ka Hai Sama" | Kishore Kumar, Mahendra Kapoor, Asha Bhosle |
| "Teri Meri Zindagi" | Lata Mangeshkar |
