= Arvind Desai Ki Ajeeb Dastaan =

1978 film

- Directed by: Saeed Akhtar Mirza
- Written by: Cyrus Mistry; Saeed Akhtar Mirza Vijay Tendulkar
- Starring: Dilip Dhawan; Anjali Paigankar; Shriram Lagoo; Om Puri; Sulabha Deshpande; Rohini Hattangadi
- Cinematography: Virendra Saini
- Edited by: Ashok Tyagi, K Mundal
- Music by: Bhaskar Chandavarkar
- Release date: 5 May 1978
- Running time: 110 minutes
- Country: India
- Language: Hindi

Arvind Desai Ki Ajeeb Dastaan is a 1978 Hindi Language film, directed by Saeed Akhtar Mirza and starring Dilip Dhawan, Anjali Paigankar, Sriram Lagoo, Rohini Hattangadi, Satish Shah and Om Puri. The Film explores the life of a guy born with a silver spoon, but no talent as his businessman father.

== Plot ==
Arvind Desai (Dilip Dhawan) is the only son of a rich businessman (Shriram Lagoo), who deals in luxury handicrafts and products. His feelings for his father are mixed. While he hates the latter's dominating nature, he admires his power and lack of scruples. He has long discussions on art and politics with a Marxist friend Rajan (Om Puri), is seeing his father's secretary Alice (Anjali Paigankar) and sometimes he visits a prostitute, Fatima. Much against his wishes, his marriage is arranged to a girl from a high-class family that has just returned from Paris, much to the dismay of Alice's mother, who realizes that Alice was a pastime for Arvind and nothing more. Suresh Oberoi has done a cameo in this movie.

Arvind has no goal; throughout he's searching for something and is severely dissatisfied.

The film ends with the craftsman making carpets.

== Awards ==
1979 Filmfare Award Best Film - Critics Saeed Akhtar Mirza
