= Sulabha Deshpande =

Indian actress and theatre director (1937–2016)

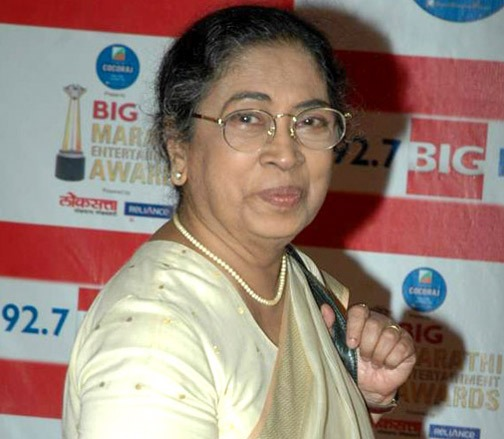
- Born: 21 February 1937; Bombay, Bombay Presidency, British India
- Died: 4 June 2016 (aged 79); Mumbai, Maharashtra, India
- Occupations: Actress; director
- Years active: 1960s–2016
- Spouse: Arvind Deshpande (m. 1960; died 1987)
- Awards: Maharashtra State Film Award for Best Actress; Sangeet Natak Akademi Award (1987)

Sulabha Deshpande (21 February 1937 – 4 June 2016) was an Indian actress and theatre director. Apart from Marathi theatre and Hindi theatre in Mumbai, she acted in over 73 mainstream Bollywood films. She also performed in art house cinema such as Bhumika (1977), Arvind Desai Ki Ajeeb Dastaan (1978), and Gaman (1978) as a character actor, along with numerous TV series and plays. A leading figure in the experimental theatre movement of the 1960s, she was associated with Rangayan, and personalities like Vijay Tendulkar, Vijaya Mehta, and Satyadev Dubey. In 1971, she co-founded the theatre group Awishkar with her husband Arvind Deshpande, and also started its children's wing, Chandrashala, which continues to perform professional children's theatre. In later years, she acted in serials such as Jee Ley Zara, Ek Packet Umeed, Asmita and in films such as English Vinglish (2012).

She was awarded Maharashtra State Film Award for Best Actress for the film Shantata! Court Chalu Aahe, and Sangeet Natak Akademi Award in 1987.

== Early life ==
She was born and brought up in Mumbai, where she studied at Siddhartha College in Fort, Mumbai, and later received a degree in education.

== Career ==
Deshpande started her career as a teacher at Chhabildas Boys' High School in Dadar, Mumbai. While working there she asked noted playwright, Vijay Tendulkar to write a few plays for her students. This started her association with theatre, and in time made her one of the pioneers in the experimental theatre movement of the 1960s, as she joined the group Rangayan, which was founded by Vijaya Mehta, Vijay Tendulkar, Arvind Deshpande and Shriram Lagoo. Soon, she started her acting career, though she first received acclaim when she won state-level competitions for her plays like Madhlya Bhintee and Sasaa Ani Kasav. After Rangayan dispersed, she along with her husband Arvind Deshpande, and Arun Kakade formed the theatre group, Awishkar in 1971. Having played the lead role of Leela Benare in Vijay Tendulkar's noted play Shantata! Court Chalu Ahe in 1967 she established her caliber. Later she reprised her role in the 1971 film version of the play directed by Satyadev Dubey, which turned out to be breakthrough role in feature films. Thereafter she went on to work extensively both in Hindi cinema as well as Marathi cinema, and directors like Shyam Benegal, through the height of Indian new wave cinema, in the 1970s and 1980s.

Awishkar was housed in the Chhabildas Hall at the Chhabildas Boys' High School, Mumbai, and thus gave rise to Chabildas theatre movement of amateur theatre. It also holds adult education workshops and trains young adults. Soon, she established the Chandrashala, the children's theatre wing of Awishkar, and directed plays like Baba Harvale Ahet, Raja Ranila Ghaam Hava and Pandit Pandit Tujhi Akkal Shendit and notably the Sangeet Natak, Durga jhali Gauri (Durga Became Gauri) in 1982, a dance drama with a cast of seventy children. She later directed the Hindi film version of the play Raja Ranila Ghaam Hava in 1978. After nearly 18 years of its establishment, Awishkar's association with Chhabildas school ended and the group restarted at the Mahim Municipal School, where it continues to hold its theatre productions, workshops and annual school production of Durga jhali Gauri performed by a new cast each year. Notable Bollywood actors Nana Patekar and Urmila Matondkar have been students of Chandrashala. She was playing the role of Grandmother-in-law in Zee Marathi's Serial Asmita.

== Personal life ==
She was married to noted theatre actor-director, Arvind Deshpande, who died in 1987.

== Death ==
Sulabha Deshpande died on 4 June 2016 in Mumbai, after a prolonged illness. She was cremated the next day.

== Filmography ==
=== Films ===
- All films are in Hindi, unless otherwise noted.

As actor
Year	Title	Role	Note(s)
1971	Shantata! Court Chalu Aahe	Leela Benare	Marathi film
1974	Jadu Ka Shankh	Sulbha	
1975	Zindagi Aur Toofan	Perin	
1977	Jait Re Jait	Nagya's mother	Marathi film
1977	Bhumika	Shanta	
1978	Arvind Desai Ki Ajeeb Dastaan	Mrs. D'costa	
1978	Kondura	Kanthamma	Hindi / Telugu film
1978	Gaman	Vasu's mother	
1979	Dooriyan	Maid	
1979	Aapli Manse		Marathi film
1980	Albert Pinto Ko Gussa Kyoon Aata Hai	Albert's mother	
1980	Kasturi	Kasturi's mother	
1980	Yeh Kaisa Insaf	Madhu's mother	
1981	Chirutha	Chirutha's mother	
1982	Vijeta	Sulbha	
1982	Sitam	Meenakshi's mother	
1982	Bheegi Palkein	Janki Kishan Acharya	
1982	Bazaar	Shabnam's mother	
1982	Ramnagari	Sita	
1984	Duniya	Mary	
1984	Hech Maza Maher	Ganga	Marathi film
1984	Lorie	Shanti	
1984	Tarang	Khalajaan	
1984	Kamla	Kamlabai	
1985	Bahu Ki Awaaz	Shobha Shrivastava	
1985	Ghar Dwaar	Ketan 's mother	
1985	Janu	Shanta Tai	
1985	Sur Sangam	Sulbha	
1985	Mahananda	Babul's Mami	
1987	Ijaazat	Parvati	
1987	Besahara	Nanda's mother	
1987	Rajlakshmi	Jamuna's mother	
1988	Tamacha	Shanti Singh	
1988	Salaam Bombay!	Social Worker at Welfare Centre	
1988	Khoon Bhari Maang	Leela	
1988	Tezaab	Munna's mother	
1989	Tridev	Tara Maasi	
1989	Balache Baap Brahmachari	Saku Mavshi	Marathi film
1989	Kalat Nakalat	Uma's mother	Marathi film
1990	Ghar Ho To Aisa	Dipti Naval's Mother	
1990	Krodh	Missing girl child's mother	Cameo
1990	Ghar Ho To Aisa	Devki	
1991	Shankara	Shankara's mother	
1991	Dushman Devta	Mrs. Dinanath	
1991	Chaukat Raja	Durga Mavshi	Marathi film
1991	Ek Full Chaar Half	Yashoda Mai	Marathi film
1991	Hafta Bandh	Bajrang's mother	
1991	Baat Hai Pyaar Ki	Damyanti	
1992	Dhaar	Sulu	
1992	Dil Aashna Hai	Lady in the orphanage	Cameo appearance
1992	Humlaa	Seema's mother	
1992	Jaan Tere Naam	Sunil's mother	
1992	Nargis	Maai	
1992	Angaar	Jaggu's mother	
1992	Lambu Dada	Mrs. Disa	
1992	Jagavegli Paij	Mavshi	Marathi film
1992	Hach Sunbaicha Bhau	Savitribai	Marathi film
1992	Anuradha	Aai	Marathi film
1993	Aadmi Khilona Hai	Buaa	
1993	Bala Jo Jo Re	Mrs. Naik	Marathi film
1993	Meharbaan	Ravi's mother	
1993	Baarish	Maria's mother	
1994	Chouraha	Jerry's mother	
1994	The Gentleman	Vijay's mother	
1994	Akka	Aatyabai	Marathi film
1995	Ab Insaf Hoga	Kashibai	
1995	Daughters of This Century	Hemlata	
1995	Yaraana	Mrs. D'Souza	
1996	Badalte Rishte	Alka	
1996	Bhishma	Paro's mother	
1996	Bhairavi	Buaji	
1997	Virasat	Bali's mother	
1997	Tamanna	Kaushalya	
1997	Ek Phool Teen Kante	Vikas 's mother	
1997	Common Man	Dadiji	
1997	Raja Ki Aayegi Baraat	Kaushalya	
1997	Ghulam-E-Mustafa	Kavita 's mother	
1998	Yugpurush	Simran	
1999	Gair	Kaushalya	
1999	Sawai Hawaldar	Ashok's mother	Marathi film
1999	Nirmala Macchindra Kamble	D. Gaekwad	Marathi film
2000	Karobaar	Ratnabai	
2001	Moksha	Eye witness	Cameo appearance
2005	The Film	Mrs. Braganza	
2005	Darpan Ke Piche	Dadi	
2006	Savita Bano	Savita	Short
2009	Vihir	Bau Aaji	Marathi film
2010	Haapus	Aajibai	Marathi film
2010	Aaji Aani Naat	Sumitra	Marathi film
2010	Bumm Bumm Bole	Kuhu's grandmother	
2011	Mala Aai Vhhaychy!	Sindhutai	Marathi film
2012	English Vinglish	Mrs. Godbole	
2013	Investment	Aai	Marathi film
2014	Nagrik	Nani	Marathi film
2014	Avatarachi Goshta	Kaustubh's grandmother	Marathi film
2017	Braveheart	Aaji Karkhanis	Marathi film

As director
Year	Title	Language	Notes
1978	Raja Rani Ko Chahiye Pasina	Hindi	Children's film

=== Television ===
As actor
Year	Title	Language	Channel
1986	Chhoti Badi Baatein	Hindi	
	Rishtey (Season 1); Episode: Jeeya Jaaye Naa...	Hindi	Zee TV
	Rishtey (Season 2); Episode: Chhaaya	Hindi	Zee TV
1995	Aahat Season 1 1995-2001 episode 116-117 Tasveer	Hindi	SET
1996	Badalte Rishte	Hindi	
1997–1999	Tanha	Hindi	StarPlus
1998	Woh	Hindi	Zee TV
1998	Alpviram	Hindi	SET
2004	Kumkum - Ek Pyara Sa Bandhan	Hindi	Star Plus
2006	Resham Dankh	Hindi	STAR One
2008	Ek Packet Umeed	Hindi	NDTV Imagine
2008-2010	Kulvadhu	Marathi	Zee Marathi
2009	Kunku	Marathi	Zee Marathi
2011	Mrs. Tendulkar	Hindi	Sony SAB
2013	Kehta Hai Dil Jee Le Zara	Hindi	SET
2014-2016	Asmita	Marathi	Zee Marathi

=== Theatre ===
Title	Language	Notes
Shantata! Court Chalu Aahe	Marathi	
Raja Ranila Ghaam Hava	Marathi	
Sakharam Binder	Marathi	
Durga Zaali Gauri	Marathi	
Baba Harvale Ahet	Marathi	
Pandit Pandit Tujhi Akkal Shendit	Marathi	

== Awards ==
She was awarded the Sangeet Natak Akademi Award for theatre acting in Marathi and Hindi theatre in 1987, the award is given by the Sangeet Natak Akademi, India's National Academy of Music, Dance & Drama. It is the highest Indian recognition given to practising artists. She also received the award, Tanveer Sanman in 2010. She has also been honoured by various other awards like Nanasaheb Phatak Puraskar, Ganpatrao Joshi Puraskar, Vasantrao Kanetkar Puraskar, Kusumagraj Puraskar, Rangabhoomi Jeevan Gaurav Puraskar and Sarvashrestha Kalagaurav Puraskar by Sanskruti Kaladarpan.
