= Rahi Masoom Raza =

Urdu and Hindi poet (1927 – 1992)

- Born: 1 September 1927; Ganguali, United Provinces, British India (present-day Uttar Pradesh, India)
- Died: 15 March 1992 (aged 64); Bombay, Maharashtra, India
- Occupations: Novelist, Urdu poet, and film songs lyricist
- Relatives: Parvati Khan (daughter-in-law)
- Writing career
- Years active: 1945 – 1992
- Notable awards: Won 3 Filmfare Award for Best Dialogue

Rahi Masoom Raza (1 September 1927 – 15 March 1992) was an Indian Urdu and Hindi poet, writer and Bollywood lyricist.

He won the Filmfare Award for Best Dialogue three times, for his work in Main Tulsi Tere Aangan Ki (1979), Tawaif (1985) and Lamhe (1991). He is best known for writing the screenplay and dialogues for the television series Mahabharat, which was based on the Sanskrit epic, the Mahabharata from ancient India.

== Early life and education ==
Raza was born on 1 September 1927 into a Muslim family in the village of Gangauli, located in the Ghazipur district of Uttar Pradesh. He was the younger brother of educationist Moonis Raza and scholar Mehdi Raza.

Raza completed his early education in Ghazipur district before pursuing higher education at Aligarh Muslim University, where his academic focus was centered on Muslim theology. He earned a doctorate in Hindustani Literature and embarked on a literary career. He married Nayyar Jahan who had been previously married. Raza was told by many of his friends to break off ties with her. But he remained firm in his resolve and they were married, which led to a controversy that made Raza quit the Aligarh Muslim University job as a lecturer. Then the married couple decided to move to Bombay where Raza would work in films in 1967.

Writing under the pseudonym Shahid Akhtar, he contributed novels to the Urdu magazine Rumani Duniya from Allahabad. Raza later became a lecturer in Urdu at Aligarh Muslim University before relocating to Bombay (now Mumbai).

== Career ==
Raza's career in Hindi films began with the romantic drama Mili (1975), directed by Hrishikesh Mukherjee. His dialogues in the film were praised, marking the beginning of his career in the Hindi film industry.

He won his first Filmfare Award for Best Dialogue for Raj Khosla's drama Main Tulsi Tere Aangan Ki (1978), which dealt with themes of love, sacrifice, and societal expectations. His dialogues were instrumental in conveying the emotional depth and complexity of the film.

After working for various successful films like Gol Maal (1979), Karz (1980), Judaai (1980) and Disco Dancer (1982), Raza's next prominent venture was the romantic drama Tawaif (1985), directed by B. R. Chopra. Showcasing the life and dilemmas of the life of a courtesan, his dialogues were instrumental in humanizing the characters and conveying the emotional depth of the narrative, contributing significantly to the film's critical acclaim. His work on the film earned him his second Filmfare Award for Best Dialogue.

He gained recognition on Hindi television for writing the screenplay and dialogues for the television serial Mahabharat, which was based on the ancient Indian epic, the Mahabharata. The serial became one of the most popular TV shows in India, achieving a peak television rating of approximately 86%.

Raza then collaborated with Honey Irani to write the screenplay and dialogues for Yash Chopra's musical romantic drama Lamhe (1991), which was a pioneering film that explored unconventional themes of love across generations. Raza's dialogues, which were pivotal in conveying Lamhe's complex emotions and progressive themes, earned widespread critical acclaim upon the film's release. At the 37th Filmfare Awards, the film won a leading 5 awards, including a third Filmfare Award for Best Dialogue for Raza. Lamhe was Raza's final film to release in his lifetime, and over the years, it has been hailed as an all-time classic and the finest film of Chopra, Irani and Raza's careers.

== Death and legacy ==
Rahi Masoom Raza died on 15 March 1992 at age 62. After his death, Raza's dialogues were featured in two more of Yash Chopra's productions, Parampara (1992) and Aaina (1993).

According to Indian Cinema Heritage Foundation (Cinemaazi.com) website:

"Regarded as nothing less than a national treasure, 'a scholar who strayed into Bollywood', his contributions to literature, poetry and films remains enormous".

== Works ==
His works include:

=== Novels ===
  - Aadha Gaon (The Divided Village)
  - Dil Ek Saada Kaghaz
  - Topi Shukla
  - Os Ki Boond
  - Katra Bi Arzoo
  - Scene No. 75

=== Poetry ===
  - Mauz-e-ghul mauz-e-saba (Urdu)
  - Ajnabee shahar: ajnabee raste (Urdu)
  - Main ek Feriwala (Hindi)
  - Sheeshe ke Makaan Wale (Hindi)

=== Autobiography ===
  - Chotey aadmi ki badee kahaani ("Big Story of a Small Man")

=== Movie and TV scripts ===
  - Neem ka Ped – novel and TV serial of the same name
  - Kissi Se Na Kehna
  - Main Tulsi Tere Aangan Ki (1978)
  - Disco Dancer (1982)
  - Mahabharat (1988)

=== Movie dialogues ===
  - Mili (1975)
  - Alaap (1977)
  - Main Tulsi Tere Aangan Ki (1978)
  - Gol Maal (1979)
  - Karz (1980)
  - Judaai (1980)
  - Hum Paanch (1980)
  - Jeevan Dhaara (1982)
  - Aaj Ka M.L.A. Ram Avtar (1984 film)
  - Tawaif (1985)
  - Dosti Dushmani (1986)
  - Anokha Rishta (1986)
  - Baat Ban Jaye (1986)
  - Naache Mayuri (1986)
  - Awam (1987)
  - Lamhe (1991)
  - Parampara (1993)
  - Aaina (1993)

=== Movie Lyrics ===
  - Alaap (1977)
  - Des Mein Nikla Hoga Chand (Jagjit Singh & Chitra Singh)

== Awards ==
Year	Award	Category	Film	Result	Ref.
1979	26th Filmfare Awards	Best Dialogue	Main Tulsi Tere Aangan Ki	Won	
1986	33rd Filmfare Awards	Best Dialogue	Tawaif	Won	
1992	37th Filmfare Awards	Best Dialogue	Lamhe	Won	
