= Situm (film) =

- poster
- Directed by: Aruna-Vikas
- Produced by: Vikram
- Starring: Naseeruddin Shah, Smita Patil, Vikram, Asrani
- Edited by: Aruna-Vikas
- Release date: 1982
- Country: India
- Language: Hindi

Situm is a 1982 Hindi film directed by Aruna Raje and Vikas Desai starring Naseeruddin Shah, Smita Patil, Vikram and Asrani among others. The then husband-wife duo worked together in the name of Aruna-Vikas jointly, before Aruna went her separate way. The rights of this film are now owned by Glamour Eyes Films.

== Plot ==
Inder, a star football player of a team thinks himself guilty of killing another football player Subhash who dies after the impact of football hit on his head which is kicked by Inder. He tries to ask for forgiveness from Meenakshi, Subhash's wife. He also gets affectionate with Subhash and Meenakshi's son. But, Meenakshi insults him and calls him killer and the person who has ruined her life. This has deep impact on Inder who is now bedridden, unstable and mentally ill, in Dr. Gindes Hospital. He starts showing signs of recovery when Meenakshi starts meeting him after she realises that Inder's illness is caused by her. In their regular meetings, Inder starts taking an interest in her, it becomes challenging for Meenakshi to reciprocate his affections. The dilemma before her is that if she spurns him he risks losing all signs of recovery.

== Cast ==
- Naseeruddin Shah as Subhash
- Smita Patil as Meenakshi
- Vikram as Inder
- Asrani
- Arun Sarnaik
- Keith Stevenson
- Vikas Desai
- Seema Deo
- Sulabha Deshpande as Meenakshi's mother

== Music ==
All songs were composed by Jagjit Singh and Chitra Singh.

Song title	Singer
"Saans Leti Hui" (version 1)	Asha Bhosle
"Saans Leti Hui" (version 2)	Asha Bhosle
"Kaun Gali Se Nikloo"	Asha Bhosle
"Kaun Gali Se Nikloo"	Ravindra Sathe
"Sitam Parody"	Mohammed Rafi
"Mumbai Konachi Re"	Hariharan, Abhijeet Bhattacharya, Vinod Sehgal, Subhash Gill
