= Aruna Raje =

Indian film director and editor (born 17 October1946)

- Born: 1946 (age 79–80); Pune, India
- Occupations: Director, Editor
- Spouse: Vikas Desai (divorced)
- Awards: Six National Awards

Aruna Raje (born 1946) is an Indian film director and editor known for her works in Hindi cinema.

== Early life ==
Aruna Raje was born on 17 October in 1946 in Pune, India.

== Education and career ==
Aruna enrolled initially at Grant Medical College in Pune to study medicine but later quit to join the Film and Television Institute of India (FTII). She passed out of FTII with a gold medal in 1969 becoming the first trained woman technician in the industry.

At the beginning of her career Aruna Raje worked jointly with her ex-husband Vikas Desai in the name of Aruna-Vikas. She co-edited acclaimed films like Giddh and Masoom. The duo later took to direction making films like Shaque, Gehrayee and Sitam. After separating from her husband she began independent film-direction, making hard hitting feminist movies.

She has also made national award-winning documentaries on the well-known classical dancer Mallika Sarabhai and special children, The New Paradigm.

She has won 6 National Awards for her films.

== Personal life ==
Aruna was married to Vikas Desai. They had a son and a daughter. The daughter aged nine died of cancer. The couple later divorced.

== Filmography ==
=== Writer ===
- 2009 Red Alert: The War Within (story)
- 2004 Tum?: A Dangerous Obsession (screenplay and story)
- 1996 Bhairavi (screenplay)
- 1988 Rihaee (screenplay and story)
- 1982 Sitam (co-written)
- 1980 Gehrayee (script)(co-written)
- 1976 Shaque (script)(co-written)

=== Director ===
- 2019 Firebrand
- 2004 Tum?: A Dangerous Obsession
- 1996 Bhairavi
- 1993 Shadi Ya... (TV Series)
- 1992 Patit Pawan
- 1988 Rihaee
- 1982 Sitam (co-directed)
- 1980 Gehrayee (co-directed)
- 1976 Shaque (co-directed)

=== Editor ===
- 2004 Tum?: A Dangerous Obsession
- 1996 Bhairavi
- 1988 Rihaee
- 1984 Giddh (co-edited)
- 1984 Masoom (co-edited)
- 1982 Sitam (co-edited)
- 1980 Gehrayee (co-edited)
- 1976 Shaque (co-edited)
