= 33rd Filmfare Awards =

1987 awards for Hindi cinema

- Date: January 28, 1987

Highlights
- Best Film: Ram Teri Ganga Maili
- Critics Award for Best Film: Aghaat
- Most awards: Ram Teri Ganga Maili (5)
- Most nominations: Ram Teri Ganga Maili & Saagar (10)

The 33rd Filmfare Awards were held in 1987, in Mumbai, India, recognising the Hindi-language films released in the year 1985.

Ram Teri Ganga Maili and Saagar led the ceremony with 10 nominations each, followed by Meri Jung and Tawaif with 7 nominations each.

Ram Teri Ganga Maili won 5 awards, including Best Film and Best Director (for Raj Kapoor), thus becoming the most-awarded film at the ceremony.

== Main awards ==
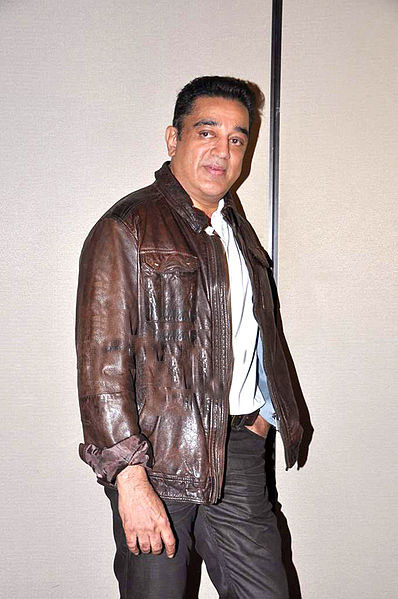
Kamal Haasan — Best Actor winner for Saagar

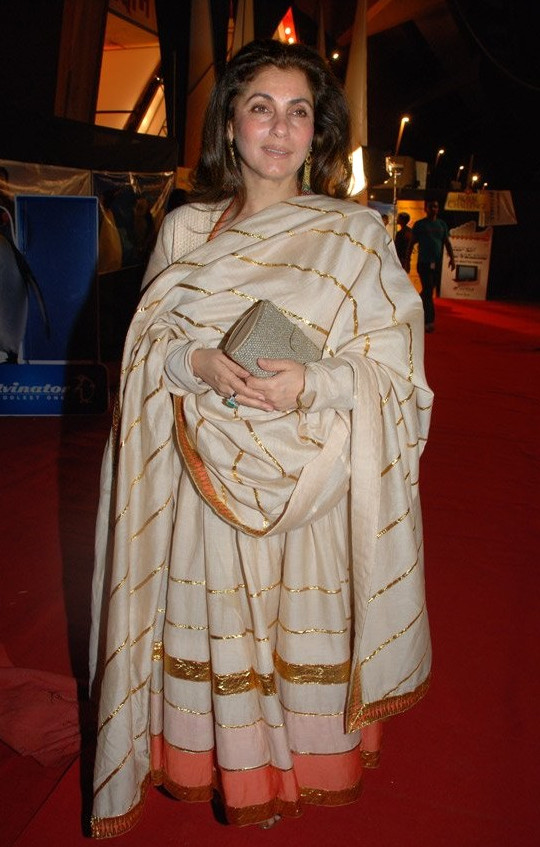
Dimple Kapadia — Best Actress winner for Saagar

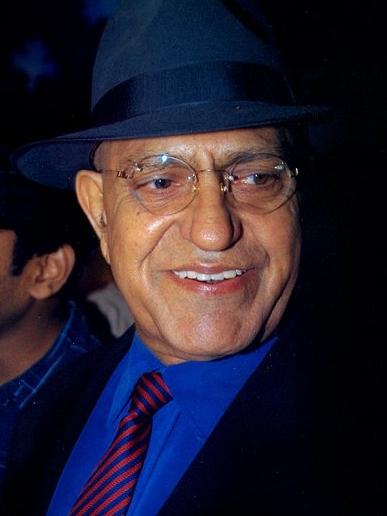
Amrish Puri — Best Supporting Actor winner for Meri Jung

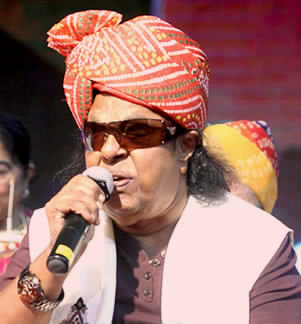
Ravindra Jain — Best Music Director winner for Ram Teri Ganga Maili

=== Best Film ===
Ram Teri Ganga Maili

- Arjun
- Ghulami
- Meri Jung
- Saagar
- Tawaif

=== Best Director ===
Raj Kapoor – Ram Teri Ganga Maili

- Mahesh Bhatt – Janam
- Rahul Rawail – Arjun
- Ramesh Sippy – Saagar
- Subhash Ghai – Meri Jung

=== Best Actor ===
Kamal Haasan – Saagar

- Amitabh Bachchan – Mard
- Anil Kapoor – Meri Jung
- Kumar Gaurav – Janam
- Rishi Kapoor – Tawaif

=== Best Actress ===
Dimple Kapadia – Saagar

- Jaya Prada – Sanjog
- Mandakini – Ram Teri Ganga Maili
- Padmini Kolhapure – Pyaar Jhukta Nahin
- Rati Agnihotri – Tawaif

=== Best Supporting Actor ===
Amrish Puri – Meri Jung

- Anupam Kher – Janam
- Kamal Haasan – Saagar
- Kulbhushan Kharbanda – Ghulami
- Saeed Jaffrey – Ram Teri Ganga Maili
- Utpal Dutt – Saaheb

=== Best Supporting Actress ===
Nutan – Meri Jung

- Anita Kanwar – Janam
- Madhur Jaffrey – Saagar
- Raakhee – Saaheb
- Sushma Seth – Tawaif
- Tanvi Azmi – Pyari Behna

=== Best Comic Actor ===
Amjad Khan – Maa Kasam

- Amjad Khan – Utsav
- Annu Kapoor – Utsav
- Deven Verma – Saaheb
- Kader Khan – Aaj Ka Daur

=== Best Story ===
Tawaif – Dr. Aleem Masroor

- Ankahee – C. T. Khanolkar
- Arjun – Javed Akhtar
- Janam – Mahesh Bhatt
- Ram Teri Ganga Maili – K. K. Singh
- Saaheb – Rajan Roy

=== Best Screenplay ===
Paar – Goutam Ghose and Partho Mukherjee

=== Best Dialogue ===
Tawaif – Rahi Masoom Raza

=== Best Music Director ===
Ram Teri Ganga Maili – Ravindra Jain

- Meri Jung – Laxmikant–Pyarelal
- Pyaar Jhukta Nahin – Laxmikant–Pyarelal
- Saagar – R.D. Burman
- Sur Sangam – Laxmikant–Pyarelal

=== Best Lyricist ===
Utsav – Vasant Dev for Mann Kyun Behka

- Meri Jung – Anand Bakshi for Zindagi Har Kadam
- Ram Teri Ganga Maili – Hasrat Jaipuri for Sun Sahiba Sun
- Saagar – Javed Akhtar for Saagar Kinare
- Saaheb – Anjaan for Yaar Bina Chain Kahaan Re
- Tawaif – Hasan Kamal for Bohot Der Se

=== Best Playback Singer, Male ===
Saagar – Kishore Kumar for Saagar Kinare

- Pyaar Jhukta Nahin – Shabbir Kumar for Tum Se Milkar Naa Jaane Kyun
- Ram Teri Ganga Maili – Suresh Wadkar for Main Hi Main Hoon

=== Best Playback Singer, Female ===
Utsav – Anuradha Paudwal for Mere Mann Bajo Mridang

- Pyaar Jhukta Nahin – Kavita Krishnamurthy for Tum Se Milkar Naa Jaane Kyun
- Saaheb – S. Janaki for Yaar Bina Chain Kahaan Re

=== Best Art Direction ===
Ram Teri Ganga Maili – Suresh J. Sawant

=== Best Cinematography ===
Saagar – S. M Anwar

=== Best Editing ===
Ram Teri Ganga Maili – Raj Kapoor

=== Best Sound ===
Shiva Ka Insaaf – A RadhaSwami

== Critics' awards ==
=== Best Film ===
Aaghat

=== Best Documentary ===
Bombay – Our City

== Most Wins ==
- Ram Teri Ganga Maili – 5/10
- Saagar – 4/10
- Tawaif – 3/7
- Utsav – 2/4
- Meri Jung – 2/7

== See also ==
- 32nd Filmfare Awards
- 34th Filmfare Awards
- Filmfare Awards
