= Tawaif (film) =

1985 film

- Film poster
- Directed by: B. R. Chopra
- Written by: Dr. Rahi Masoom Reza; Aleem Masrur; Satish Bhatnagar; C. J. Pavri
- Produced by: R. C. Kumar
- Starring: Rishi Kapoor; Rati Agnihotri; Poonam Dhillon; Deepak Parashar
- Cinematography: Dharam Chopra
- Edited by: S. B. Mane
- Music by: Ravi
- Distributed by: Sunshine Productions
- Release date: 6 September 1985
- Running time: 142 minutes
- Country: India
- Language: Hindi

Tawaif is a 1985 Indian Hindi-language drama genre film. It was produced by R. C. Kumar and directed by B. R. Chopra.

It stars Rishi Kapoor, Rati Agnihotri, Poonam Dhillon, Deepak Parashar in lead roles, with Ashok Kumar, Kader Khan, Asrani, Iftekhar, Shashikala, Sushma Seth in other important roles.

== Plot ==
Dawood Mohammed Ali Khan Yusufzai (Rishi Kapoor) is an orphan and lives at a community home owned by Ameena Bai (Sushma Seth) who treats Dawood as her son. Dawood works at a publishing house "Kitaab Gher" owned by Mr. Nigam (Ashok Kumar). One day he finds a manuscript in a bus which has name and address of the writer. He reached the address to meet the writer Kaynat Mirza (Poonam Dhillon), who is a young and beautiful girl. He sets a meeting of Kainat with Sulaiman (Deepak Parashar) the editor of the publishing house.

One night he hears a distraught knock at his door. As he opens the door, a mafia lord Rahim Shaikh (Kader Khan) rushed in along with a bejeweled woman. He asks Dawood to let the woman stay there the night or he will kill him. Next morning Ameena and rest of the people assume the woman of be Dawood's wife and arrange a feast for them. Dawood is angry at the women who tells him his story. The woman, Sultana (Rati Agnihotri) is a courtesan purchased by Rahim Shaikh to be resold to the highest bidder. However, police arrived before the bidding process is complete and Rahim runs away with Sultana. Rahim is arrested and his goons warn both Sultana and Dawood to stay together till Rahim gets out and claims Sultana.

Word of Dawood's marriage gets to his office and his colleague push for a feast. Sultana arranges for the feast by selling her jewels. Rahim gets released but Sultana strikes a deal with him that she will return in couple of days. Meanwhile, Sultana rescues a neighbor girl from a con man while tried to sell her, her gesture finally earns her Dawood's respect. Kainat's novel gets published after which Dawood and Kainat confess their love to each other. Sulaiman sends Dawood to Kainat's home to fix his marriage with her. Kainat refuses but she is told about the first wife of Dawood.

Devastated Kainat goes to see Sultana. Sultana clarifies the situation with Kainat and her mother. Next morning after sending Dawood to office, she says goodbye to Ameena Bai and rest of the neighborhood under the pretense of visit to sick mother. She tries to escape by is apprehended by Rahim Shaikh, Kainat witnesses that and followed her. Kainat makes Dawood realize that he actually loves Sultana and encourages him to bring Sultana back.

Dawood tried to rescue Sultana but is beaten by Rahim Shaikh who questions Dawood if the society will accept Sultana, a courtesan, as his wife. Ameena bai walks in along with whole neighborhood and Mr Nigam to assure their acceptance of Sultana. Rahim is arrested and Sultana finally weds Dawood.

== Cast ==
- Ashok Kumar as Mr. Nigam
- Rishi Kapoor as Dawood Mohammed Ali Khan Yusufzai
- Rati Agnihotri as Sultana
- Poonam Dhillon as Kaynat Mirza
- Deepak Parashar as Sulaiman
- Kader Khan as Rahim Shaikh
- Asrani as Constable Pandya
- Iftekhar as Lala Fakirchand
- Shashikala as Bilquis Bai
- Sushma Seth as Ameena Bai

== Soundtrack ==
The music for all the songs were composed by Ravi and penned by Hasan Kamaal.

No.	Title	Singer(s)	Length
1.	"Ae Khuda-E-Pak"	Mahendra Kapoor
2.	"Tere Pyar Ki Tamanna"	Mahendra Kapoor
3.	"Mera Shauhar Bada Sharmeela, Baitha Hai Dekho"	Mahendra Kapoor, Asha Bhosle
4.	"Joban Anmol Balma"	Asha Bhosle
5.	"Bahut Der Kar Di"	Asha Bhosle
6.	"Aaj Ki Sham"	Asha Bhosle

== Awards ==
33rd Filmfare Awards:

Won

- Best Story – Dr. Aleem Masroor
- Best Dialogue – Rahi Masoom Raza

Nominated

- Best Film – R. C. Kumar
- Best Actor – Rishi Kapoor
- Best Actress – Rati Agnihotri
- Best Supporting Actress – Sushma Seth
- Best Lyricist – Hasan Kamal for "Bohot Der Se"
