= Saaransh =

- Film poster
- Directed by: Mahesh Bhatt
- Written by: Mahesh Bhatt (screenplay & dialogue); Sujit Sen (screenplay & dialogue); Amit Khanna (dialogue)
- Story by: Mahesh Bhatt
- Produced by: Tarachand Barjatya
- Starring: Anupam Kher; Rohini Hattangadi; Soni Razdan; Madan Jain; Nilu Phule
- Cinematography: Adeep Tandon
- Edited by: David Dhawan
- Music by: Ajit Verman
- Distributed by: Rajshri
- Release date: 25 May 1984
- Running time: 137 minutes
- Country: India
- Language: Hindi

Saaransh (English: The Gist ) is a 1984 Indian Hindi drama film directed by Mahesh Bhatt, starring Anupam Kher, Rohini Hattangadi, Madan Jain, Nilu Phule, Suhas Bhalekar and Soni Razdan. It is about an elderly Maharashtrian couple living in Mumbai who come to terms with the loss of their only son. This was the screen debut of Anupam Kher. The film had music by Ajit Verman and lyrics by Vasant Dev. It was produced and distributed by Rajshri Productions. It was chosen as India's official entry for the 1985 Academy Award for Best Foreign Language Film and was not nominated.

== Plot ==
The film begins with B.V. Pradhan waking up early in the morning to write a letter to his son, Ajay, who lives in New York. Midway through the letter, Pradhan remembers the tragic reality: Pradhan received a call from a friend of Ajay's that Ajay has been killed in a mugging in New York. Pradhan's best friend, Vishwanath, and Pradhan's wife, Parvati are both worried that even though it has been 3 months, Pradhan has yet to fully come to terms with the loss of his only son. Pradhan confesses to Vishwanath that after the loss of his son, he no longer has any will left to live.

Due to the death of their son, Pradhan has no source of income, so they rent out a room of their Shivaji Park (Mumbai) apartment to a budding Bollywood actress, Sujata Suman. Sujata is romantically involved with Vilas (Madan Jain), the only son of an influential politician Gajanan Chitre. Vilas wishes to marry Sujata, but he does not tell his father about Sujata out of cowardice and keeps postponing their marriage plans.

Meanwhile, Pradhan receives a registered letter that his son's ashes and a few other belongings (a TV, VCR, a refrigerator etc.) have arrived from USA to India. When Pradhan goes to the customs office to collect them, he is disrespected and gets no help from the Public Relations Officer. An emotionally disturbed and enraged Pradhan forcibly enters the office of the main head of the customs department and explains that he has come only to pick up his son's ashes and not any other material possessions. Pradhan demands that his son's ashes be handed to him immediately and breaks down to tears, upon which the officer consoles Pradhan and relents to his request. The officer apologises for the inconvenience and assures Pradhan that the remaining items will be transferred to Pradhan as soon as possible.

Pradhan, an atheist, gives his son's ashes to Parvati, who takes his ashes to a Pandit. The Pandit tells Pradhan and Parvati that Ajay will soon be reincarnated, in the form of a baby, near them. Disillusioned, Pradhan takes some of Ajay's ashes and spreads them near a park bench in the nearby kids park. Realising the futility of his painful life, Pradhan tries to commit suicide by diving under a speeding car, albeit unsuccessfully. Parvati implores him to change his mind, but Pradhan does not relent. Finally, they both decide to end their lives by consuming poison together.

Just as Pradhan and Parvati are about to commit suicide, Sujata informs Vilas that she's pregnant. When Vilas still shows indecisiveness in marrying Sujata, she calls him a coward and throws him out. When Pradhan finds out, he offers to take Sujata to meet Gajanan with the hope that he will permit Sujata and Vilas to get married. When Vilas refuses to accept that Sujata is carrying his baby, Gajanan, despite knowing that Vilas is lying, refuses their proposal and threatens Pradhan and Sujata with dire consequences if Sujata does not abort the child and move away to another town. However, Pradhan, out of principle, refuses to let a helpless Sujata leave and provides her a safe haven in his house. Parvati, upon hearing that Sujata is with a baby, starts believing that the baby in Sujata's womb is, in fact, going to be the reincarnation of Ajay. She starts caring for Sujata and her beliefs about Ajay being reincarnated get even more firmly entrenched in her mind.

Gajanan tries all the tricks of the trade to dissuade Sujata from having the baby: his goons try to bribe Pradhan, they harass Pradhan by cutting off the electricity to his house and beat up Vishwanath (thereby preventing him from supplying milk to Pradhan's house) and his goons even throw ignited crackers into Pradhan's house. Gajanan himself persuades a local doctor to illegally carry out the abortion of Sujata's baby in his clinic (where Sujata is scheduled for a checkup). When all else fails, Gajanan, through Vilas (who is unaware of his father's intentions) traps Pradhan in a fake scam of aiding and abetting a prostitution ring (involving illegally marked bills). Pradhan tries to call the Commissioner of Police for help, but is prevented due to red-tapism. Exasperated, Pradhan storms into the Mantralaya, the office of the Chief Minister of Maharashtra. The C.M. turns out to be one of Pradhan's former students, Shashikant. The C.M. immediately calls up the Commissioner of Police, the Remand Home where Sujata is being held in custody and demands Gajanan Chitre be produced to ensure that justice is rightfully served.

Pradhan realises that Parvati's adamant belief that Ajay will be reincarnated as Sujata's baby will cause problems to them and Sujata and Vilas, so he asks them both to leave the city in the wee hours of the night and go live their lives happily elsewhere. He gifts them Ajay's belongings that have finally been handed over to Pradhan by the customs office. Sujata, however, requests to see Parvati one last time. When Parvati refuses to let Vilas and Sujata leave, Pradhan controls her and makes them leave. Parvati is shocked and heartbroken, but Pradhan helps her realise that Ajay has died and will never come back. When Parvati says that they should both consume poison together, Pradhan refuses, saying that he has realised that the Saaransh of his life is in her beautiful wrinkles, and they have both done a good deed in helping Sujata's baby survive despite the problems she faced.

The movie ends with Pradhan taking Parvati for an early morning walk to the nearby kids park. There, they see that beautiful flowers have sprouted where Pradhan once scattered some of Ajay's ashes. Pradhan then tells Parvati that the real beauty of life is that we all are mortal, but life goes on.

== Cast ==
- Anupam Kher as B.V. Pradhan
- Rohini Hattangadi as Parvati Pradhan
- Soni Razdan as Sujata Suman
- Madan Jain as Vilas Chitre
- Suhas Bhalekar as Vishwanath
- Alok Nath as Pandit / Astrologer
- Akash Khurana as Chief Minister Shashikant (as Aakash Khurana)
- Vijay Kashyap as Dr. Bhatt
- Kishore Jariwala
- Suresh Chatwal as Police Inspector
- Salim Ghouse as Gajanan Chitre's Goon (with acid)
- Arun Bakshi as Gajanan Chitre's Goon
- Haidar Ali
- Nilu Phule as Gajanan Chitre

== Production ==
Made after his critically acclaimed Arth (1982), this film carried forward his venturing into the genre of confessional cinema. It was inspired by the death of a young son of Mahesh Bhatt's spiritual guru, U. G. Krishnamurti of cancer, and later by a Maharashtrian couple whose only son was murdered in New York.

Initially Anupam Kher, originally from Shimla and a National School of Drama alumnus, was chosen to play the lead role. Later producers Rajshri Productions insisted in taking an established actor, Sanjeev Kumar for the role. Thus, a fortnight before the principal photography was to commence, Kher, who had been preparing for almost sixth months for his debut, got the news. When Bhatt confirmed the change, he packed his bags and left town. However, before leaving, he met Bhatt and expressed his frustration. Subsequently, Bhatt kept him as the lead, and the producers agreed.

The film began on 1 January 1984 with very first scene of Pradhan played by Kher, receiving the phone call from New York. Kher was only 28 years old, when he played the role of a retired stubborn old man. For the pivotal scene, where he had to haggle with customs officials to recover his son's ashes. Kher had no reference of such a situation and tapped into all his hardships as struggling actor in Mumbai to reach the emotional point. The scene was shot at an office space in Film City, Mumbai, and was completed in a single take, without rehearsals or use of glycerine. He went on to win Filmfare Award for Best Actor for his performance. Rohini Hattangadi was only 28 years old at the time but her performance as the 60-plus housewife is still etched in everyone’s memory.

== Themes ==
Saaransh explores how the couple copes with the loneliness and anxieties of old age and the utter aimlessness of life after the death of their only son, a victim of arbitrary violence. While the headmaster's wife seeks refuge in religion and faith, the headmaster remains stoic and becomes obsessive about the memories of his son. In his efforts to reach out to his dead son, he starts writing letters to him every day, only to tear them up. It also focuses on the importance of finding new meaning and purpose in life, no matter the age.

Other themes it touches on are through Pradhan's interactions with custom officials and police — corruption, politics-crime nexus and bureaucratic delay, rampant bribery and red-tapism.

== Music ==
The music was given by Ajit Varman and the lyrics by Vasant Dev.

- "Andhiyara Gehraya Suna Pan Phir Aaya" – Bhupinder Singh
- "Har Ghadi Dhal Rahi Sham Hai Zindagi" – Amit Kumar

== Reception ==
The lead pair, Anupam Kher and Rohini Hattangadi, were praised for their portrayals, described by The Tribune as "immortal performances". Chander Uday Singh of India Today wrote ″Although Bhatt has used artistes with little cinematic experience (barring Hattangady and Phule) he draws superb performances from them. Kher stops short of being brilliant only because he occasionally lapses into a vigour out of keeping with the ageing and broken Pradhan. Hattangady, fresh from the success of Gandhi, remains convincing in the difficult role of Parvati.″ In a retrospective review on films 30th anniversary in 2014, Sukanya Verma of Rediff.com wrote, "Bhatt’s finest film, which celebrates its 30th anniversary on May 25, isn’t comfort cinema. Devoid of cheer and falsehoods, Saaransh is armed with a leading man like Anupam Kher who single-handedly enriches its story into an experience so personal, poignant and profound, only the callous can stay unmoved."

Saaransh was included in the Panorama section of the 1984 International Film Festival of India (IFFI). It was India's official submission for the Academy Award for Best Foreign Language Film, though it did not make it to the final run. Among other awards, Bhatt received a special prize at the 14th Moscow International Film Festival, and was a nominee for the Golden Prize.

Coming after the success of Arth (1982), the critical acclaim of Saaransh established Bhatt as a director of repute. Even today, it remains one of the few stand out in "middle-of-the-road" films of the 1980s decade Hindi cinema, which is retrospectively seen as a decade of decline of content in the mainstream cinema. Encyclopædia Britannica's "Encyclopedia of Hindi Cinema" described Saaransh as Mahesh Bhatt's "finest film – moving, mellow, and mature – as the viewer feels the pain and despair of an elderly couple..." In 2016, on the occasion of India celebrating its 70th Independence day, news agency NDTV compiled a list called "70 Years, 70 Great Films" and Saaransh was among those chosen.

== Awards ==
32nd National Film Awards:

- Best Lyrics – Vasant Dev

32nd Filmfare Awards:

Won

- Best Actor – Anupam Kher
- Best Story – Mahesh Bhatt
- Best Art Direction – Madhukar Shinde

Nominated

- Best Film – Tarachand Barjatya
- Best Director– Mahesh Bhatt
- Best Actress – Rohini Hattangadi
- Best Supporting Actress – Soni Razdan

== Bibliography ==
- DIFF (1985). Indian Cinema. Directorate of Film Festivals, Ministry of Information and Broadcasting.
- Garga, Bhagwan Das (1996). So many cinemas: the motion picture in India. Eminence Designs. ISBN 978-81-900602-1-9.
- Spinelli, Italo (2002). Indian Summer: Films, Filmmakers and Stars Between Ray and Bollywood. Edizioni Oliveras. ISBN 9788885982680.
- Chandrasekhar, Indira; Seel, Peter C. (2003). Body city: siting contemporary culture in India. Haus Der Kulturen Der Welt. ISBN 978-81-85229-76-8.
- Gulzar; Nihalani, Govind; Chatterjee, Saibal (2003). Encyclopaedia of Hindi Cinema. Popular Prakashan. ISBN 978-81-7991-066-5.
- Ray, Bibekananda; Joshi, Naveen (2005). Conscience of the race: India's offbeat cinema. Publications Division, Ministry of Information and Broadcasting, Government of India. ISBN 978-81-230-1298-8.
- Sommaya, Bhawana; Kothari, Jigna; Madangarli, Supriya (2013). Mother Maiden Mistress. HarperCollins Publishers. ISBN 978-93-5029-485-7.
- Dasgupta, Koral (2014). Power of a Common Man Connecting with Consumers The SRK Way. Westland. ISBN 978-93-84030-15-5.
- Bajaj, J.K. (2014). On & Behind the Indian Cinema. Diamond Pocket Books Pvt Ltd. ISBN 978-93-5083-621-7.
