= Dilip Dhawan =

Indian actor

- Born: 1955
- Died: 15 February 2000 (aged 44–45); Mumbai, Maharashtra, India
- Occupation: Actor
- Years active: 1968–2000

Dilip Dhawan (1955 – 15 February 2000) was an Indian film and television actor.

He started his career as a child in Sangharsh (1968), featuring Dilip Kumar. Dhawan acted in over 50 films.

== Career ==
He acted as the lead in the film Arvind Desai Ki Ajeeb Dastaan in 1978. He is known for his role as "Guru" in the television serial Nukkad. Dhawan also acted in serials such as Janam, Deewar and Tere Mere Sapne. He also acted in films like Ek Baar Kaho (1980), Albert Pinto Ko Gussa Kyon Ata Hai (1980), Sazaye Maut (1981), Saaheb (1985), Dak Bangla (1987), Hero Hiralal (1988), Swarg (1990), Izzatdaar (1990), Heena (1991), Madhosh (1994), Yash (1996), Virasat (1997), Hum Saath-Saath Hain: We Stand United (1999) and Raja Ko Rani Se Pyar Ho Gaya (2000).

He was also the producer of the film Saath Saath, in 1982.

== Personal life ==
He was the son of character actor Krishan Dhawan. He died on 15 February 2000, in Mumbai, at the age of 45, of a heart attack.

== Filmography ==
=== Films ===
Year	Film	Role	Notes
1968	Sangharsh		Child artist
1976	Murder at Monkey Hill	Woodcutter	Cameo appearance
1978	Arvind Desai Ki Ajeeb Dastaan	Arvind Desai	
1980	Albert Pinto Ko Gussa Kyon Ata Hai	Dominic Pinto	
1980	Ek Baar Kaho		
1981	Sazaye Maut	Anil Suri	
1982	Aagman		
1982	Meri Kahani		
1983	Bade Dilwala	Dr Ali Khan	
1983	Do Gulab		
1984	Pratibha		
1985	Saaheb		
1985	Khoon Aur Sazaa		
1987	Dak Bangla		
1988	Hero Hiralal	Robin – Autorickshaw driver	
1989	Shiva	Shiva's brother	
1989	Doosra Kanoon		Television movie
1990	Chhottur Pratishodh		Bengali film
1990	Swarg	Ravi	
1990	Izzatdaar	Tony	
1991	Henna	Razzak	
1992	Geet Milan Ke Gaate Rahenge		
1992	Tahalka	Captain Wilson D'Costa	
1993	Hum Hain Kamaal Ke	Manish	
1994	Madhosh		
1994	Chauraha	Raman	
1996	Aurat Aurat Aurat		
1996	Yash	Balraj Sahay	
1997	Virasat	Shakti's brother	
1998	Badmash		
1999	Kabhi Paas Kabhi Fail		
1999	Hum Saath-Saath Hain	Anurag	
1999	Rasmon Ki Zanjeer		
2000	Raja Ko Rani Se Pyar Ho Gaya	Rohit Kumar	Posthumous release

=== Television ===
Year	Serial	Role	Channel	Notes
1986–87	Nukkad	Guru	DD National	
1992–1993	Pukar			
1993	Log Kya Kahengay			
1993–94	Naya Nukkad	Guru		Sequel to Nukkad
1993–94	Dillagi	GM of office	Zee TV	
1998	One 2 ka 4		Zee TV	
