= Anjali Paigankar =

Indian actress

- Occupation: Actress

Anjali Paigankar is a Hindi and Marathi film actress.

A graduate of Film and Television Institute of India (FTII), Pune, Anjali appeared in Murder at Monkey Hill, Vidhu Vinod Chopra’s diploma film as a final year student there in 1976. The short film was noticed in parallel cinema circles earning work for many of the students involved in the film. The previous year she had already appeared in a short role in Shyam Benegal’s Charandas Chor. In 1977, she appeared in Amol Palekar starrer Taxi-Taxie but the film flopped.

Anjali went on to act in a Marathi film Sarvasakshi and a Hindi film Dillagi, both released in 1978. The same year she appeared as a main female lead in the film Arvind Desai Ki Ajeeb Dastaan. She also acted in Chakra and Albert Pinto Ko Gussa Kyon Ata Hai after that.

== Filmography ==
| Year | Film | Role | Other notes |
|---|---|---|---|
| 1975 | Charandas Chor | | |
| 1976 | Murder at Monkey Hill | | |
| 1977 | Taxi Taxie | | |
| 1978 | Sarvasakshi | Rekha | |
| 1978 | Arvind Desai Ki Ajeeb Dastaan | Alice D'Costa | |
| 1978 | Dillagi | Shobha | |
| 1980 | Albert Pinto Ko Gussa Kyon Ata Hai | | |
| 1981 | Chakra | Chenna | |
| 1984 | Mohan Joshi Hazir Ho! | Joshi's son's girlfriend | |
