= Albert Pinto Ko Gussa Kyoon Aata Hai? (1980 film) =

Albert Pinto Ko Gussa Kyoon Aata Hai
- Film poster
- Directed by: Saeed Akhtar Mirza
- Story by: Saeed Akhtar Mirza
- Produced by: Saeed Akhtar Mirza
- Starring: Naseeruddin Shah; Shabana Azmi; Smita Patil; Om Puri
- Cinematography: Virendra Saini
- Edited by: Renu Saluja
- Music by: Bhaskar Chandavarkar; Manas Mukherjee
- Release date: 1980
- Running time: 110 mins
- Country: India
- Language: Hindi

Albert Pinto Ko Gussa Kyoon Aata Hai (transl. What Makes Albert Pinto Angry?) is a 1980 Indian Hindi-language drama film directed and written by Saeed Akhtar Mirza. The film stars Naseeruddin Shah, Shabana Azmi and Smita Patil.

It won the 1981 Filmfare Critics Award for Best Movie.

== Synopsis ==
The film captures the anger of a worker, in Mumbai exemplified by a young Christian car mechanic, Albert Pinto (Naseeruddin Shah), who is under the illusion that if he works hard and emulates the rich, one day he can also be successful. He makes friendly relations with his customers, who are usually the rich of the city and who keep telling him that good workers do not go on strike, and that strikes are the handiwork of low-class elements. Pinto gets angry with the supposedly wrong attitudes of the workers who he assumes go on strike under any pretext. However, when Pinto's father, a mill worker, is abused by goons hired by the mill owners, he realizes that it is not the workers, but the capitalists who should be blamed for the plight of the workers. He also realizes the legitimacy of strikes. Towards the end of the movie, Pinto still remains an angry man; but now his anger is directed against the capitalists, not the striking workers.

== Cast ==
- Naseeruddin Shah as Albert Pinto
- Shabana Azmi as Stella D'Costa
- Smita Patil as Joan Pinto
- Dilip Dhawan as Dominic Pinto
- Sulabha Deshpande as Mrs. Pinto, Albert's mother
- Arvind Deshpande as Mr. Pinto, Albert's father
- Rohini Hattangadi as Vivek's wife
- Achyut Potdar as Chandumal Potdar (mill owner)
- Mushtaq Khan as The Lecherous Shopper tying to flirt with Joan Pinto
- Anjali Paigankar
- Om Puri as Madhu (mechanic)
- Satish Shah
- Avtar Gill
- Utpal Dutt
- Naresh Suri
- Nitin Sethi

== Awards and nominations ==
Year	Nominee / work	Award	Result
1981	Saeed Akhtar Mirza	Filmfare Critics Award for Best Movie	Won

== Remake ==
In 2019, the film was remade with the same title. With a cast of Manav Kaul, Nandita Das and Saurabh Shukla, the official remake was directed by Soumitra Ranade. It was premiered at 1st edition of Singapore South Asian Film Festival held from 1 to 10 September 2017. It was released in theaters on 12 April 2019.
