= Janam (1985 film) =

- Screenplay by: Mahesh Bhatt; Suraj Sanim (Dialogues)
- Directed by: Mahesh Bhatt
- Starring: Kumar Gaurav; Anupam Kher; Anita Kanwar; Shernaz Patel
- Music by: Ajit Verman
- Country of origin: India
- Original language: Hindi

Production
- Producer: Mudra Videotech
- Cinematography: Pravin Bhatt
- Editor: Renu Saluja
- Running time: 109 minutes

Original release
- Network: DD National
- Release: 4 December 1985

Janam ("Birth") is a 1985 Indian television film directed and written by Mahesh Bhatt. It is one of the autobiographical films Bhatt created in the early part of his career. The film was remade in Telugu as Aakasamantha. The film premiered on 4 December 1985 on DD National.

== Plot ==
Rahul is a struggling filmmaker who spends his nights in empty theatres and his friend Asghar's restaurant. Asghar tries to convince many financers and producers to invest in Rahul's script. He mostly roams around the city and avoids going home because of his tumultuous relationship with his father, Virendra Desai, who is a fading filmmaker. Rahul is Virendra's illegitimate son and always argues with his mother, Nalini about the insults he faces from Virendra's family whenever he visits Virendra's home. He also falls in love with an orphan Rohini. When Virendra's mother dies, Nalini forces Rahul to visit their house, but Vilas Virendra's legitimate son insults and heckles him out, Fed up of being insulted he asks Nalini that why is she putting up with Virendra's double life, She explains that Virendra fell in love with her. Being a small junior artist, Virendra's mother opposed Nalini and Virendra's marriage and forced him to marry a girl of her choice. After this revelation Rahul angrily goes to Virendra's house to take him to Nalini's house but Virendra refuses to come and says that Rahul is illegitimate for him and Vilas will light the funeral pyre if he dies. Enraged by this decision Rahul leaves the house and tries to stay at Rohini's hostel but is caught by the hostel authorities. Rohini is expelled from the hostel and now Rahul brings Rohini into their house to stay with him, but Virendra being present there gets into an argument with Rahul and Rahul is thrown away from the house along with Rohini. After that incident they marry and settle in a house provided by Asghar. To meet the house expenses, Rohini gets a job. When Rahul decides to narrate a script to a producer he sees Virendra there. Virendra chides Rahul for living on his wife's salary and dissuades him from taking up filmmaking since Virendra's films of late have not been successful. Irritated by the constant insults Rahul behaves rudely with Rohini the following night. Rohini not taking offense motivates Rahul to be more focused on his work. Asghar finally convinces a producer to finance Rahul's film. When Rahul reads his old script he decides not to make a film on it. He decides to make a film on his hardships and struggles as an illegitimate child. This news spreads like wildfire and Virendra fearing for his reputation tries to stop Rahul's film by pressuring him and threatening him with defamation cases. Virendra also influences Rahul's producer to drop the finance in between the making, While shooting for the film he notices his step-sister Varsha being mishandled by Vilas's friends. Angry at him, Rahul saves Varsha's life since Vilas is drunk and chides Virendra to handle his legitimate son's life. Struggling again Asghar decides to sell his restaurant without telling Rahul to arrange the film's budget. The film releases and becomes a commercial and a critical success, with Rahul winning awards for his work. At an awards show Virendra decides to arrest Rahul with the help of police but is moved by Rahul's speech at the show where in he understands Rahul's love for him, with Rahul requesting Virendra to give him the award. Virendra realizing his mistakes accepts Nalini as his wife and Rahul as his son.The film ends when Virendra and Rahul embrace each other publicly.

== Cast ==
- Kumar Gaurav as Rahul Desai
- Anupam Kher as Virendra Desai
- Shernaz Patel as Rohini Rahul Desai
- Kitu Gidwani
- Anita Kanwar as Nalini
- Akash Khurana as Asghar Ali
- Madan Jain as Vilas Desai

== Awards ==
33rd Filmfare Awards:

Nominated

- Best Director – Mahesh Bhatt
- Best Actor – Kumar Gaurav
- Best Supporting Actor – Anupam Kher
- Best Supporting Actress – Anita Kanwar
- Best Story – Mahesh Bhatt
