= Vasant Dev =

Indian writer and academic

Vasant Dev (1929–1996) was an Indian writer, lyricist and screenwriter and a Hindi academic at Parle College (now known as Sathaye College) in Mumbai. He worked in Hindi parallel cinema through the 1980s, working with directors like Shyam Benegal, Govind Nihalani and Mahesh Bhatt as a dialogue writer and lyricist. He is best known for "Saanjh Dhale Gagan Tale" sung by Suresh Wadkar, and "Mann Kyun Behka", a Lata Mangeshkar and Asha Bhosle duet in Utsav (1984) directed by Girish Karnad. He wrote plays and poetry in Marathi and was a prolific Marathi-to-Hindi translator who translated many plays by Vijay Tendulkar and G.P. Deshpande.

At the 32nd National Film Awards, he won the National Film Award for Best Lyrics for Saaransh (1984), "Andhiyara Gehraya Suna Pan Phir Aaya". Subsequently, at the 33rd Filmfare Awards, he won the Filmfare Award for Best Lyricist for song, "Mann Kyun Behka" in Utsav. In 1980s, for the television serial ‘’Bharat Ek Khoj’’ (Discovery of India), director Shyam Benegal asked Vasant Deo to translate Sanskrit hymns from Rigveda in Hindi. They were set to music by Vanraj Bhatia.

== Filmography ==
=== Dialogue ===
- Umbartha (1982)
- Ardh Satya (1983)
- Party (1984, assistant dialogue)
- Kamla (1984)
- Nasoor (1985)
- Sur Sangham (1985)
- Andha Yudh (1987)
- Bharat Ek Khoj (TV series) (1988)

=== Lyricist ===
- Bhumika (1977)
- Aakrosh (1980)
- Saaransh (1984)
- Giddh (1984)
- Utsav (1984)
- Sur Sangham (1985)
- Ramayana: The Legend of Prince Rama (1992) Sanskrit songs

== Translation Works in Hindi ==
- Ja Hi Puchho Sadhu ki (Play). Org play by Vijay Tendulkar. Rajkamal Prakashan, 2024. ISBN 9788126721214.
- Ghasiram Kotwal (Play). Org play by Vijay Tendulkar. Rajkamal Prakashan, 2025 (11th ed.). ISBN 9788126713455.
- Kanyadan (Play). Org play by Vijay Tendulkar. Vani Prakashan, 2024 (2nd ed.). ISBN 9387409287.
- Giddh (Play). Org play by Vijay Tendulkar. Vani Prakashan, 2018 (1st ed.). ASIN B07HMDVQ7X.
- Kamla (Play). Org play by Vijay Tendulkar. Rajkamal Prakashan, 2023 (2nd ed.). ISBN 9788119159352.
- Meeta Ki Kahani (Play). Org play by Vijay Tendulkar. Vani Prakashan, 2018. ISBN 9387409325.
- Beby (Play). Org play by Vijay Tendulkar. Vani Prakashan, 2025 (2nd ed.). ISBN 9387409147.
- Mrityunjaya (Novel). Novel by Shivaji Sawant. Vani Prakashan (2nd ed.). ISBN 9789362879127.
