= Haji Ismail Yusuf =

Indian businessman (c. 1870 - 1915)

Ismail Yusuf (also known as Haji Ismail Yusuf) c. 1870 - 1915, was an early 20th century Indian businessman and the proprietor of Bombay Steam Navigation Company. The Yusuf family own vast amounts of land in Mumbai and in the vicinity as is one of the ten largest private landowners in Mumbai.

== Life and family ==
Ismail Yusuf was the son of Haji Hasham (Haji Ismail Hasham) and the father of Sir Mohamed Yusuf, born into an influential Kutchi Memon family who trace their origins to the modern Gujarat. He was the proprietor of Bombay Steam Navigation company, a shipping company which was founded by his father, Haji Hasham. It was the first Indian owned shipping company. Later he went on to establish a Marine College at Rashid Mansion, Worli Point, Bombay, as a charitable institution in debt of gratitude to the mercantile seafaring community who had served bravely and loyally on the Company's ships.

He died in 1915 and is buried in a mausoleum in the family estate at Samandar mahal, Mumbai, beside the grave of Ma Hajiani.

== Legacy ==
- Sir Mohamed Yusuf Seamen Welfare Foundation (founded 1910)
- Training Ship Rahaman (Nhava, India)
- Ismail Yusuf College (Andheri, Mumbai, India)
