= Bhai: Vyakti Ki Valli 2 =

- Promotional release poster
- Directed by: Mahesh Manjrekar
- Written by: Ganesh Matkari; Ratnakar Matkari
- Produced by: Mahesh Manjrekar; Avinash Ahaley; Vaibhav Pandit; Mahesh Patel; Virendra Updhye
- Starring: Sagar Deshmukh; Iravati Harshe
- Cinematography: Karan B. Rawat
- Production companies: Viacom18 Motion Pictures; Mahesh Manjrekar Movies
- Release date: 8 February 2019
- Running time: 111 minutes
- Country: India
- Language: Marathi

Bhai: Vyakti Ki Valli Uttarrardh is an Indian Marathi-language biographical drama film based on Purushottam Laxman Deshpande, a sequel of Bhai: Vyakti Ki Valli. It is directed by Mahesh Manjrekar and produced by Viacom18 Motion Pictures. Sagar Deshmukh and Iravati Harshe played lead roles. It was theatrically released on 8 February 2019.

== Cast ==
- Sagar Deshmukh as Bhai Purushottam Laxman Deshpande
  - Vijay Kenkre as Bhai (old) Purushottam Laxman Deshpande
- Iravati Harshe as Sunita Thakur
- Padmanabh Bind as Vasantarao Deshpande
- Swanand Kirkire as Kumar Gandharva
- Sunil Barve as Jabbar Patel
- Neena Kulkarni as Vijaya Mehta
- Ajay Purkar as Bhimsen Joshi
- Kshitij Date as Satish Dubhashi
- Umesh Jagtap as Ram Gabale
- Sanjay Khapre as Baba Amte
- Deepti Lele as Bhakti Barve
- Vikram Gaikwad as Vijay Tendulkar
- Dalip Tahil as Jawaharlal Nehru
- Abhijeet Chavan as Pralhad Keshav Atre
- Sarang Sathaye as Bal Thackeray
- Shailesh Datar as Manohar Joshi
- Dhananjay Mandrekar as Gopinath Munde
- Bharat Ganeshpure as Khasdar
- Mahesh Manjrekar as Nandu Kamat
- Medha Manjrekar as Sadhna Amte
- Satish Alekar as Ramakant
- Pooja Sawant as Jaymala
- Girish Kulkarni as Barkya
- Ashwini Giri as Bhai's mother
- Veena Jamkar as Champutai
- Sagar Karande as Vasanta
- Shrikant Kharade as politician

== Release ==
=== Theatrical ===
It was theatrically released on 8 February 2019.

=== Home media ===
The digital streaming rights of the film is acquired by Netflix.

== Reception ==
=== Critical reception ===
Shalmesh More of Koimoi rates 4 stars out of 5 praised performances, editing as well as balanced mixture of fun and emotion. Ajay Parchure of Lokmat rates 4 out of 5 stars And said that the second part of the franchise is more interesting and fast-paced than the first part. Sachin Patil also reviewed for TV9 Marathi that the second part is interesting. Loksatta wrote "The life events of the brothers were shown together while showing the biographies. But even that does not fully reveal the personality of Pul. Overall, it can be said that this effort of director Mahesh Manjrekar was not so successful." Ibrahim Afghan of The Times of India gave 2.5 rating out of 5.
