= Hamid Dalwai =

Indian social reformer

- Born: 29 September 1932; Mirjoli, Bombay Presidency, British India
- Died: 3 May 1977 (aged 44); Bombay, Maharashtra, India
- Education: Ismail Yusuf College; Ruparel College
- Occupations: Journalist; social reformer; author; activist; essayist; writer
- Known for: Founder of Muslim Satyashodhak Mandal and Indian Secular Society
- Notable work: Muslim Politics in Secular India (1968)
- Spouse: Meherunissa Dalwai (m. 1956)
- Children: 2
- Relatives: Husain Dalwai (Brother)

Hamid Umar Dalwai (29 September 1932 – 3 May 1977) was an Indian journalist, social reformer, thinker, activist, author, writer and the founder of Muslim Satyashodhak Mandal and Indian Secular Society. Despite being an atheist, he attempted and advocated for several modernistic and liberal reforms within the Indian Muslim community, most notably being his futile agitation against the practice of triple talaq and polygyny during the 1960s. He has also authored several books, including Muslim Politics in Secular India (1968).

== Early life and education ==
Dalwai was born to a Marathi-speaking Muslim family on September 29, 1932 in Mirjoli village of Bombay Presidency (now Maharashtra) during the British Raj. He received secondary education at Chiplun. After his matriculation in 1951, he attended Ismail Yusuf College and Ruparel College in Mumbai. Between mid-1950s and early 1960s, he was introduced to the Samajwadi Party's political and cultural wing, Rashtra Seva Dal. He began writing short stories in magazines like Mauj, Satyakatha, and Vasudha.

== Career ==
Dalwai joined the Indian Socialist Party of Jai Prakash Narayan in his early adulthood, but left it to devote himself to social reforms in the Muslim community, especially regarding women's rights. Despite living in a period when most people were staunchly religious and orthodox, Hamid Dalwai was one among the few religiously secular people. He strove towards a uniform civil code rather than religion specific laws, and fought to abolish Triple talaq in India.

To create a platform for his views and work, he established the Muslim Satyashodhak Mandal (Muslim Truth Seeking Society) in Pune on 22 March 1970. Through the medium of this Society, Hamid worked towards reforming bad practices in the Muslim community especially towards women. He helped many Muslim women who were victimised to get justice. He campaigned for encouraging Muslims in acquiring education in the State language rather than Urdu, their mother tongue. He also tried to make adoption an acceptable practice in the Indian Muslim community.

He also established the Indian Secular Society. He organised many public meetings, gatherings, conventions and conferences to campaign for better social practices. He was also a great Marathi litterateur. He wrote Indhan (Fuel) - a novel, Laat (Wave) - a collection of short stories and Muslim Politics in Secular India - a thought provoking book. He used the medium of his writing for social reform.

An unprecedented event in his social work was the Muslim women’s march that he organised on the Mantralaya (the administrative headquarters of Maharashtra in South Mumbai, built in 1955) to fight for their rights. Hamid Dalwai dealt with opposition with tremendous equanimity and worked towards social reform without getting discouraged at the slow rate of success. It is because of these traits that the great Marathi genius P. L. Aka PuLa Deshpande described him as a great social reformer and put him in the same bracket as the great Indian leaders Mahatma Jyotiba Phule and Ambedkar.

He died of progressive kidney failure on 3 May 1977, at the age of 44.

== Literary works ==
Dalwai worked as a journalist. His works include Lat (The Wave) and Indhan (Fuel) in Marathi, and Muslim Politics In Secular India in English, Islamche Bhartiya Chitra (Islam's Indian story) in Marathi, Rashtriya Ekatmata aani Bhartiya Musalman (National Unity and Indian Muslim) in Marathi.He also has written a short story namely "10 rupayachi goshta" which was later published in "Dhanurdhara" magazine.

== Family ==
Dalwai's brother Husain Dalwai is a Congress leader in Maharashtra. He was a member of Parliament upper house - Rajya Sabha. He also served as a Congress spokesperson in Maharashtra.

== Works ==
- Muslim politics in India. Nachiketa Publications, 1969

== In popular culture ==
In 2017 a documentary about Hamid Dalwai was made by actress Jyoti Subhash.

== Legacy ==
Muslim Satyashodhak Mandal continue to organize various social events in Maharashtra, to propagate the ideas of Hamid Dalwai and create awareness amongst masses about equality, women empowerment and Hindu-Muslim brotherhood. The trust also felicitates eminent personalities with Satyshodak Award. In 2019, noted humanist Ms Zeenat Shaukat Ali and acclaimed Lavani writer- poet Lokshahir Bashir Momin Kavathekar were conferred with 'Satyshodak Award'.
