= Govind Talwalkar =

Indian journalist and author (1925–2017)

- Born: 22 July 1925; Dombivali, Bombay presidency
- Died: 21 March 2017 (aged 91); Cleveland
- Occupation: Journalist
- Years active: 1948 – 2017

Govind Shripad Talwalkar (22 July 1925 – 21 March 2017), also known honorifically as Govindrao Talwalkar) was an Indian journalist, the editor of Maharashtra Times, historian, scholar, intellectual with liberal views, social reformer and author of 32 books. He received the Lokmanya Tilak Award from the Government of Maharashtra, India and also the B. D. Goenka Award, Durga Ratan Award, Agarkar Award & Bhalerao Award for excellence in journalism and Ramshastri award for social justice. He received Maharashtra Government Award for his book - Navroji te Nehru; and N.C. Kelkar Award and Sahitya Paishad Award for his four volume book - Soviet Samrajyacha Uday ani Asta; and Damani Award for his book - Badalta Europe.

== Early life ==
Talwalkar was born on 22 July 1925 in Dombivali, in the Indian state of Maharashtra. His grandfather entered this birthdate when he enrolled him in the school; however, the real birthdate might have been 23 July 1925.

Coming from a family with limited means, Talwalkar graduated from the university of Mumbai while doing odd jobs at the same time to pay for his fees. Talwalkar's family has a special place in Maharashtra. Talwalkar's uncle Gopinath Talwalkar was a well-known poet and writer. His other uncle Sharad Talwalkar was a famous actor in Marathi films and on stage.

== Career ==
=== Editing Loksatta ===
After getting a degree, Talwalkar joined an intellectual magazine, Navbharat. After that, he was invited by Mr. H.R. Mahajani, the then editor of Loksatta, a Marathi daily of the Indian Express Group, to join as a sub-editor. The work was not clearly defined. Talwalkar started writing editorials in the daily and the weekly edition of the paper. In fact, he wrote an editorial the first day he joined Loksatta at the age 24. He was greatly influenced by the writings of Lokmanya Tilak, M.N. Roy, and other intellectuals. From 1950 to 1962 he served as assistant editor of Loksatta.

=== Editor of the Maharashtra Times ===
Talwalkar worked as associate editor of the Maharashtra Times, a new Marathi daily launched by the Times of India group for almost six years. He became acting chief editor in 1967 and the chief editor in 1968, remaining in that role for 27 years until he retired in 1996. He also established a record as the longest serving editor in Bennett Coleman and Co. which owns the Times of India Group. The company is more than 150 years old. In Loksatta & Maharashtra Times he wrote around 8000 editorials during his tenure, which is a record in itself. In addition, he wrote articles on diverse subjects of national and international importance and educated his readers. The newspaper acquired the status of a legend during his tenure. In the impact that his writings had on Maharashtrian society, Talwalkar has been compared to Bal Gangadhar Tilak. In the history of Marathi journalism, there have been two great epochs, the Age of Tilak and the Age of Talwalkar Such was his influence on the social, political, economic, educational, cultural and intellectual life of Maharashtra. Several readers acknowledge that they learnt what to read and how to think rationally because of him. He was a visionary editor, a man of ideas, who gave a new direction to Marathi journalism. He believed that the pursuit of knowledge and science, public service and moral foundation were the key to achieving greatness for a national. He edited his paper with this agenda and encouraged his readers to follow these principles.

Talwalkar is best known for his editorials and articles. According to Raj Thackeray, "Talwalkar justified being recognized as Agralekhancha Badshah (the emperor of editorials)". Late famous Marathi writer, journalist and intellectual, S. M. Mate. admiringly remarked that Talwalkar had a felicity of pen, while poet G. D. Madgulkar used to call him "DnyanMurti" and "DnyanGunSagar". In the tradition of Lokmanya Tilak & the Maharashtrian saint Samarth Ramdas, he used simple Marathi to make difficult subjects easily understandable to ordinary readers, while at the same time making all salient points with notable gravitas. Several of his editorials and articles are collected in his books, including Agralekh, Bahar, Pushpanjali, Lal gulag ('Red Gulag'), Niyatishi karar.

Shri Govind Talwalkar had been a Guiding Light for three generations of Maharashtrians. He had the greatest influence over the literary, political, educational, social, cultural and intellectual fabric of post-independence Maharashtra over fifty years. As an editor, he made his mark as an intellectual, interested in diverse subjects. He educated his readers. In the words of famous economist Nani Palkhiwala, he was an institution. Poet Kusumagraj noted that Talwalkar was doing a great public service by educating the masses through his newspaper and setting an example in excellence, promoting good reading, writing and diverse and original ideas.

He was best known for his editorials, which appealed to the reason. His hard-hitting editorials were feared but respected by the politicians and people in powerful places; and immensely admired by the masses and the scholars. In this he followed the tradition of Lokmanya Tilak. He did so selflessly, without expecting any Padma award, a seat on Rajya Sabha or anything for that matter.

He had no party affiliation. He was admired by his readers across the ideological spectrum, and feared by politicians across the ideological spectrum as well. He set the tone of discussion in Maharashtra and his writings addressed topics including the land-less labour, famine conditions, dams, agriculture, banking, economic reforms, refugee problem and problems facing the universities, need to abolish superstition, need for social justice for the downtrodden and many important issues. He wrote in support of secularism. He exposed corruption in politics, universities, hospitals, social and public matters. Under his editorship Maharashtra Times was rightly regarded as a broad intellectual forum. Talwalkar was in high esteem for his honesty, integrity, courage and intellectual contribution to the society. To him goes a large share of credit for nourishing Maharashtrians' moral universe and keeping politicians on a tight leash. He stood for credibility. It is said that some politicians have blocked giving him PadmaVibhushan award, while honouring many undeserving people.

Though proud of his mother-tongue, Marathi, Talwalkar thought that his readers should know the best literature in various languages. He started a popular column introducing books in English, writing under the pseudonym Vachaspati. They were not just book reviews. He wrote a critical essay on the book and that subject, thereby enlightening the readers on that subject matter, and encouraging them to read and widening their intellectual horizon. His articles on books have been published as collections – Vachta vachta, Granthasangati, Sourabh.

On his retirement in 1996, Talwalkar and his wife Shakuntala settled with their daughters in the United States, but continued to write critical articles and essays in Marathi and English on world politics, economics, history, social issues and books. He died on 21 March 2017 at the age of 91.

He helped generously to people in need and donated for public causes over the years. He donated his precious collection of 5000 books to the Bhandarkar Oriental Research Institute in Pune, where they are placed in a special memorial hall named after him on his first birth anniversary in 2017. He had previously donated several thousand other books to libraries.

== Author of books on modern history of India and the world ==
Talwalkar was a scholar as well as a writer. His books were based on deep research. He has written several books on the modern history of India. His book on the constitutional aspects of transfer of power in India - Sattantar:1947, vol 1,2,3 - is now in its third edition. This book as well as his other books Naoroji te Nehru, Niyatishi Karar, Gandhi Parva (vol 1 and 2) encompass the freedom movement of India, for the transfer of power from the British, with the historical, economic and cultural perspective and lucid analysis. They are considered very important for the study of that period for scholars as well as general public.

Many of Talwalkar's books are on the leaders of India's freedom movement : Justice Ranade, Tilak, Gopal Krishna Gokhale. Like Gokhale, Talwalkar was a social reformer and a patriot. The books Naoroji te Nehru; Virat dnyani:Nyaymurti Ranade; Tilak darshan; Bal Gangadhar Tilak received various awards. He translated his Marathi book Nek Namdar Gokhale into English, entitled, Gopal Krishna Gokhale: Life and Times, published by Rupa and Co. The Tribune's review of Gopal Krishna Gokhale: Life and Times praises Talwalkar as "a versatile journalist", and describes the book as a "comprehensive study" with a "lucid and straightforward" narrative. Talwalkar made further changes to this book in English. This new book entitled Gopal Krishna Gokhale:Gandhi's Political Guru was published by the Pentagon Press. The Hindu's review of Gopal Krishna Gokhale:Gandhi's political guru notes that in addition to being a classic biography of Gokhale, it is also an in-depth study of the country's freedom struggle in the early stages; and skillfully locates Gokhale's work in the context of his times.

Talwalkar's book Bharat Ani Jag is a scholarly analysis of India's foreign policy and economic and political situation in the post-independence era (i.e. since 1947). It is a valuable reference book.

Talwalkar was the author of books on the wars in Iraq & Afghanistan – Iraqdahan, Agnikand.

== Freethinker, writer on the Soviet empire, China and communism ==
From the 1950s, India sought economic and technological help from the Soviet Union. When it was fashionable to be a communist, Talwalkar remained an independent and wrote against the totalitarianism of the Right as well as the Left. He was steeped in the humanist thoughts of M. N. Roy, George Orwell, Karl Pauper, Arthur Koestler, and Kolakowsky. In fact, he had predicted the fall of Soviet Union long before other experts.

After the collapse of the Soviet Union, Talwalkar toured Eastern Europe and wrote journalistic essays on the changing scene. These are collected in his book – Badalta Europe. He was a scholar of Russian studies. He wrote a four volume book in Marathi on the rise and fall of the Soviet empire: Soviet Samrajyacha Uday Ani Asta, winning the Kelkar prize. His book Lal Gulag is a collection of his articles on communist Russia and China.

== Journalist ==
Talwalkar contributed articles in English to newspapers including The Times of India, The Telegraph (of Calcutta), The Illustrated Weekly of India, Frontline magazine, The Mainstream and the Deccan Herald, The Tribune (Chandigarh), Outlookindia and Asian Age .

He regularly wrote articles in Marathi for a literary magazine Lalit. After retirement he wrote a regular column – Saurabh – in Lalit each month on books & other topics such as 400th anniversary of saint Ramdas Swami. These articles are published by Majestic prakashan under the title Sourabh, vol. 1 & 2. Grantha Sangati is another collection of his book reviews published by Popular Prakashan.

He has received the Durga Ratan and B.D. Goenka Awards for excellence in journalism, and the Ramshatri Award for social justice.

After retirement, Talwalkar wrote regularly for the daily, Divya Marathi and weekly Sadhana and occasionally for Maharashtra Times and other Marathi newspapers, and in English for The Tribune (Chandigarh), The Asian Age.

Talwalkar continued original research right till the end. In 2016 he obtained original papers from Japan and Russia and proved that the freedom fighter Subhas Chandra Bose did die in the aeroplane crash. He wrote articles in the Tribune (Chandigarh) which finally put to rest the controversy surrounding Subhas Babu's death. Bose's grand nephew Ashis Ray uploaded this very important information on the website he specially created and devoted to Subhas Bose.

Bibliography

- Doctor Ziwagocha Itihas Marathi article in Monthly Lalit, Diwali issue, 2015.
- Subhash babuncha Kaavya-shastra-vinod:Marathi article in Mauj Diwali issue, 2015
- Govind Talwalkar. Gopal Krishna Gokhale: his life and times. Rupa and co, 2006. ISBN 978-81-291-0877-7 Exotic India (bookshop) Rupa and co (publishers)
- Gopal Krishna Gokhale : Gandhi's Political Guru. Pentagon Press, 2015
- Govind Talwalkar. Bāḷa Gaṅgādhara Ṭiḷaka. Mumbaī: Mǎjestika Buka Stǎla, 1977. WorldCat
- Open Library (LISTING of 11 books published by Talwalkar)

== Books in Marathi ==
He has written 32 books in Marathi. Some are collection of his articles.

- Tilak Darshan;
- Bal Gangadhar Tilak,
- Vachta Vachta;
- Navroji te Nehru, S
- Sattantar:1947, vol 1-3,
- Niyatishi Karar;
- Agralekh;
- Parikrama; V
- Virat Dnyani Nyaymurti Ranade;
- Abhijat;
- Granthasangati,
- Sourabh,
- Badalta Europe;
- Prasangik;
- Pushpanjali vol 1 & 2;
- Akshay;
- Bahar;
- Manthan,
- Vyakti ani Vangmay;
- Badalta Europe;
- Soviet samrajyacha uday ani asta, vol 1–4;
- Lal gulag;
- Agnikand;
- Iraqdahan;
- Nek namdar Gokhale;
- Bharat ani jag;
- Vaicharik vyaspeethe,
- Dickens ani Trollope;
- Madhughat,
- Gandhiparva vol 1 & 2;
- Yashwantrao Chavan: Vyaktitva v kartutva;
- Paramarsh (in press)

== Books in English ==
- Gopal Krishna Gokhale: Life and Times;
- Gopal Krishna Gokhale: Gandhi's political guru ;
- Y.B. Chavan:Life and Times
- He contributed articles on Lokmanya Tilak, Dinshaw Wacha, Pherojshah Mehta, Dr. B.R. Ambedkar for the respective centenary volumes on them in English.

== Book on Govind Talwalkar (In Marathi) ==
Dnyanmurti Govind Talwalkar

== Philanthropy ==
- Donation to various charities, social causes
- Helping people affected by famine, flood, riots etc.
- Donation to Bhandarkar Oriental Research Institute, Pune for digitization of ancient books
- Donation to Sadhana Publication, Pune
- Donation to support education of students
- Donation to Muslim Satyashodhak Mandal, Pune
- Donation to Ferguson College, Pune
- Donation to charity to help women
- Donation to orphanage
