= Bhai: Vyakti Ki Valli =

- Theatrical release poster
- Directed by: Mahesh Manjrekar
- Written by: Ganesh Matkari
- Produced by: Mahesh Manjrekar; Avinash Ahaley; Vaibhav Pandit; Mahesh Patel; Virendra Upadhye
- Starring: Sagar Deshmukh; Iravati Harshe; Mrunmayee Deshpande; Saksham Kulkarni; Satish Alekar; Neena Kulkarni
- Cinematography: Karan B. Rawat
- Edited by: Abhijeet Deshpande
- Music by: Ajit Parab
- Production companies: Viacom18 Motion Pictures; Mahesh Manjrekar Movies
- Release date: 4 January 2019
- Running time: 108 minutes
- Country: India
- Language: Marathi

Bhai: Vyakti Ki Valli is a Marathi Biographical film directed by Mahesh Manjrekar. The title role of Purushottam Laxman Deshpande is played by Sagar Deshmukh. The film was released on 4 January 2019. A sequel, Bhai: Vyakti Ki Valli 2, was released on 8 February 2019.

== Plot ==
The film is biography on the famous writer Purushottam Laxman Deshpande. The details about his life are also taken from the book "Aaahe Manohar Tari" written by his wife Sunita Deshpande. The film has been created into two parts looking at the work Pu La Deshpande did. The 1st half was released on 4 January 2019, all over India. The 2nd half was released on 8 February 2019.

== Cast ==
The film casts more than 80 important characters.

- Sagar Deshmukh as Middle age Pu La Deshpande
  - Vijay Kenkre as old Pu La Deshpande
    - Saksham Kulkarni as Young Pu La Deshpande
- Mrunmayee Deshpande as Sundar (Pu La's first wife)
- Iravati Harshe as Sunita Deshpande
  - Shubhangi Damle as Old Sunita Deshpande
- Neena Kulkarni as Vijaya Mehta
  - Madhura Velankar as young Vijaya Mehta
- Sunil Barve as Jabbar Patel
- Swanand Kirkire as Kumar Gandharva
- Ajay Purkar as Bhimsen Joshi
- Sujay Dahake as Babasaheb Purandare
- Dilip Tahil as Jawaharlal Nehru
- Padmanabh Bind as Vasantrao Deshpande
- Sagar Talashikar as G. D. Madgulkar
- Umesh Jagtap as Ram Gabale
- Mahesh Manjrekar as Nandu
- Satish Alekar as Ramakant Deshpande (Pu La's brother)
- Ashwini Giri as Pu La's mother
- Vidyadhar Joshi as Anna Karve
- Sagar Karande as Vasanta
- Veena Jamkar as Champu Tai
- Prem Dharmadhikari as child Bal Thackeray
- Sachin Khedekar As Pu La's father Lakshman Deshpande
- Ganesh Yadav as Chintamanrao Kolhatkar
- Kedar Soman as Prof. B. C. Mardhekar

== Reception ==
The movie was criticized for taking unnecessary cinematic liberty, defaming many well known, well respected, and prominent personalities along with Pu La himself; and distortion of facts from the descriptions in books by Pu La himself and Sunitabai's book Aahe Manohar Tari.

== See also ==
- Purushottam Laxman Deshpande
