= Dattatray Ramachandra Bhat =

Indian actor

- Born: Nashik
- Other names: Datta Bhat
- Occupation: Stage/Film Actor

Dattatray Ramachandra Bhat popularly known as Datta Bhat was an Indian film and theatre actor, in Hindi and Marathi.

== Stage career ==
Bhat played the role of Natsamrat in noted Marathi playwright Kusumagraj’s iconic & milestone Marathi play "Natsamrat" after Dr. Shriram Lagoo. He has worked with many eminent theatre directors including Madhukar Phatak, Vishnu Pant Godbole, Damu Kenkre and Vijaya Mehta. He is known for his contribution to the traditional narrative Aakhyan form.

== Movie career ==
Bhat is an actor, known for Marathi movies like Sarvasakshi (1978), Sinhasan (1979) and Maaficha Sakshidar (1986). He has also worked in Hindi movies in Comedy film Damaad (1978) and Murder Mystery film Hanste Khelte (1984).

== Awards ==
For his eminence in the field of theatre and his contribution to its enrichment, Shri Dattatray Ramchandra Bhat received the Sangeet Natak Akademi Award for Acting for 1983.
