= Natsamrat (2018 film) =

- Movie poster
- Gujarati: નટસમ્રાટ
- Directed by: Jayant Gilatar
- Written by: Pravin Solanki
- Screenplay by: Pravin Solanki
- Based on: Natsamrat (drama) by V. V. Shirwadkar
- Produced by: Rahul Sughand; Jugal Sughand; Ravindra Tendulkar; Ajay Bagdai
- Starring: Siddharth Randeria; Deepika Chikhalia; Manoj Joshi; Samvedna Suwalka
- Cinematography: Shreedhar Bhatt
- Edited by: Deepak Wirkund; Vilas Ranade; Tushar Parekh
- Music by: Alap Desai
- Production companies: Sughand Films; Vivid Productions; Shyam Purohit
- Distributed by: Sughand Films
- Release date: 30 August 2018 (India)
- Running time: 130 minutes
- Country: India
- Language: Gujarati
- Box office: est. ₹2 crore (US$210,000)

Natsamrat (transl. The King of Theater or The Emperor of Actors) is a 2018 Indian Gujarati-language drama film starring Siddharth Randeria and Deepika Chikhalia in the leading role. The film is the remake of Marathi film of the same name starring Nana Patekar, which is based on Marathi play by V. V. Shirwadkar. Before making it to the big screen, Randeria has adopted the screen play to a Gujarati-language stage play named Amari Duniya, Tamari Duniya in 2007, with many known faces of Gujarati theatre including Randeria himself, Jimmit Trivedi, and Disha Savla-Upadhyay. The story of the film is about an actor who has reached many heights in his career, but has to retire from acting at the peak.

== Cast ==
- Siddharth Randeria as Harindra Pathak
- Deepika Chikhalia as Mangala Pathak
- Manoj Joshi as Madhav
- Samvedna Suwalka as Neha
- Tasneem Sheikh as Jigna
- Hemang Vyas as Makrand

== Release ==
This film was released in theatres on 30 August 2018.

== Reception ==
The Times of India gave this movie 4 out of 5 stars. As per the ticket booking site Bookmyshow, the film earned around ₹2 crore (US$210,000).

== See also ==
- Natsamrat (Marathi)
