= List of ship launches in 1933 =

The list of ship launches in 1933 includes a chronological list of some ships launched in 1933.

| Date | Ship | Class | Builder | Location | Country | Notes |
|---|---|---|---|---|---|---|
| 25 February | Ranger | Unique aircraft carrier | Newport News Shipbuilding | Newport News, Virginia | United States | |
| 9 March | San Francisco | New Orleans-class cruiser | Mare Island Navy Yard | Vallejo, California | United States | |
| 1 April | Admiral Scheer | Deutschland-class cruiser | Reichsmarinewerft Wilhelmshaven | Wilhelmshaven | Germany | |
| 12 April | New Orleans | New Orleans-class cruiser | New York Navy Yard | Brooklyn, New York | United States | |
| 12 April | Brittany | Ferry | William Denny & Bros Ltd | Dumbarton, Scotland | United Kingdom | For Southern Railway |
| 3 May | Gorch Fock | Gorch Fock-class barque | Blohm + Voss | Hamburg | Germany | For Reichsmarine |
| 4 July | Chandravati | Ferry | Harland & Wolff | Belfast | United Kingdom | For Bombay Steam Navigation Co. |
| July | Carl Röver | Fishing trawler | Deschimag Seebeckwerft | Wesermünde | Germany | For Nordsee Deutsche Hochseefischerei Bremen-Cuxhaven AG |
| July | R. Walther Darré | Fishing trawler | Deschimag Seebeckwerft | Wesermünde | Germany | For Nordsee Deutsche Hochseefischerei Bremen-Cuxhaven AG |
| 9 August | Baron Dunmore | Cargo ship | Harland & Wolff | Belfast | United Kingdom | For H. Hogarth & Sons. |
| 17 August | Prabhavati | Ferry | Harland & Wolff | Belfast | United Kingdom | For Bombay Steam Navigation Co. |
| 6 September | Baron Elgin | Cargo ship | Harland & Wolff | Belfast | United Kingdom | For H. Hogarth & Sons. |
| 6 September | Minneapolis | New Orleans-class cruiser | Philadelphia Navy Yard | Philadelphia, Pennsylvania | United States | |
| 7 September | Stettin | Steam icebreaker | Stettiner Oderwerke | Stettin | Germany | For Stettin Chamber of Commerce |
| 15 November | Tuscaloosa | New Orleans-class cruiser | New York Shipbuilding Corporation | Camden, New Jersey | United States | |
| 16 December | Astoria | New Orleans-class cruiser | Puget Sound Navy Yard | Bremerton, Washington | United States | |
| 20 December | Halcyon | Halcyon-class minesweeper | John Brown & Company | Clydebank, Scotland | United Kingdom | for Royal Navy |
| Date unknown | Acklam Cross | Tug | Hall, Russell & Co. Ltd. | Aberdeen | United Kingdom | For Robinson & Crosthwaite. |
| Date unknown | Alabama | Dredger | Alabama Drydock and Shipbuilding Company | Mobile, Alabama | United States | For McWilliams Dredging Co. |
| Date unknown | Pass of Balmaha | Coastal tanker | | | United Kingdom | For Bulk Oil Steamship Co. |
| Date unknown | Sam Houston | Dredger | Alabama Drydock and Shipbuilding Company | Mobile, Alabama | United States | For Atlantic Gulf and Pacific Steamship Corporation. |
| Date unknown | Superman | Tug | Cochrane & Son Ltd. | Selby | United Kingdom | For United Towing Co. Ltd. |
