= Sinhasan =

1979 Indian Marathi-language political drama film

- Film poster
- Directed by: Jabbar Patel
- Written by: Arun Sadhoo
- Screenplay by: Vijay Tendulkar
- Story by: Arun Sadhoo
- Based on: Sinhasan by Arun Sadhoo Mumbai Dinank by Arun Sadhu
- Starring: Nilu Phule; Shriram Lagoo; Mohan Agashe; Nana Patekar; Satish Dubhashi; Jairam Hardikar
- Cinematography: Suryakant Lavande
- Edited by: N. S. Vaidya
- Music by: Hridaynath Mangeshkar
- Release date: 1979
- Country: India
- Language: Marathi

Sinhasan (transl. Throne) is 1979 Indian Marathi-language political drama film directed by Jabbar Patel and written by journalist Arun Sadhu. The film is based on two novels - one of the same name and the other named Mumbai Dinank by writer and freelance journalist Arun Sadhu. The film starring Nilu Phule, Arun Sarnaik, Shriram Lagoo, Mohan Agashe, Reema Lagoo, Nana Patekar, Usha Nadkarni, Datta Bhatt and Satish Dubhashi. Film Won National Film Award for Best Marathi Feature Film at 27th National Film Awards.

== Plot ==
The movie draws a parallel with the political turmoil in India.

The main character is a journalist named Digu Tipnis (Nilu Phule) who uncovers a network of telephone tapping, relations between trade unions and politicians, etc. The plot addresses Maharashtra's political corruption linked with Mumbai's entrepreneurial sector. The movie starts with an assembly session where Chief Minister (Arun Sarnaik) has to leave the heated discussion to attend an urgent call. The caller (claiming to be a well-wisher and informer) informs the CM that some of the members from his own party are secretly planning to remove him from his chair. The phone call changes the political scenario in the state, and many activities start taking place behind the curtains. CM obviously doubts the finance minister of the state (Shriram Lagoo) who has started gathering the support of MLAs for trying to pose himself as a better candidate for a Chief Ministerial Post. In this chaos, certain factors like Media (Nilu Phule – Digambar - A journalist), a Union Leader named D’casta who has decided to take head on with smugglers (see a young Nana Patekar – a small time criminal) gain high bargaining power. The struggle for power reaches its peak when CM deals with issues like hunger strikes, workers' strikes, famine, and deaths due to malnutrition. Digambar (who is already troubled in his personal life) observes all these negotiations, compromises and horse-trading that are happening in the political arena. The Union leader announces a conference where he is going to reveal some secrets, FM almost manages to gather the required numbers, and CM tries to judge who is on which side. And as a last nail in the coffin, one of the confidants in the Police informs CM that the Police is about to arrest his (CM's) brother-in-law on the charges of smuggling. The FM faction is about to start the celebrations, and suddenly some news strikes that shocks everyone involved. What is that news? Is it really true? What impact would it have on the political scene? The future events are very fast and unimaginable.

The movie has lot of scenes in between including extra marital affairs of Digambars maid with others, her husband (Nana Patekar), also the affair of the Finance Minister Sriram Lagoo with his daughter in law (Reema Lagoo), once such scene is quiet enticing in the movie in which Digambar goes to a saloon for haircut, and when the barber probes him about the future of Maharashtra CM, he bluntly tells him "whosoever becomes the CM, how will that make any changes in your life as a common man?" In short this is a very touchy, emotional, dramatic as well as realistic movie. Especially the song "Usha kaal hota hota" is heart wrenching. Towards the end, Digu Tipnis becomes insane after being frustrated with the corrupt political system. The movie outlines the effect of the selfish and voracious behaviour of white collars and politicians on the common man. During one session in Vidhan Sabha (State Legislative Assembly), Arun Sarnaik as the chief minister, whose mental and physical health is disturbed by an anonymous phone call warning him of a conspiracy to dislodge him. The vultures in Jivajirao's party, including ministers played by Madhukar Toradmal and Shriram Lagoo, swoop down on him after a bout of stress-induced illness. They advise Jivajirao to “take it easy”, but he ignores the unsubtle hints and instead plays his own game of thrones, working the phone lines to pit one cabinet minister against the other.

== Cast ==
- Nilu Phule as Digu Tipnis
- Arun Sarnaik as Chief Minister Jivajirao Shinde (Aaba)
- Shriram Lagoo as Finance Minister Vishwasrao Dabhade
- Mohan Agashe as MLA Bhudhaji
- Reema Lagoo as Kamal Dabhade; Dabhade's daughter-in-law
- Nana Patekar as Smuggler
- Usha Nadkarni as Shanti
- Datta Bhat as MLA Manikrao Patil
- Madhukar Toradmal as Daulatrao Patil
- Shrikant Moghe as Anandrao Topale
- Satish Dubhashi as Sabastian Dicasta
- Jairam Hardikar as Panitkar
- Rekha Kamat as Chief Minister's wife
- Lalan Sarang as Mrs. Chandrapure
- Shekhar Navre as Vasant Dabhade
- Irshad Hashmi as Metha Sheth
- Madhav Watve as Nanasaheb Gupte
- Ravindra Bapat as Doctor
- Ravi Patwardhan

== Music ==
The movie became quite famous for the song "Ushakkal hota hota". The song was based on poem written by poet Suresh Bhat. The music was composed by Hridaynath Mangeshkar. The song is fiery as well as heart touching. It showed the misery of common man in a corrupt social and political environment.

== Accolades ==
- 1980 - National Film Award for Best Marathi Feature Film.
- 1980 - Maharashtra State Film Award for Best Second Feature Film.
- 1980 - Maharashtra State Film Award for Best Second Director.
