= Mohamed Yusuf =

Indian businessman and philanthropist

Mohamed Yusuf (Sindhi: محمد يوسف, also known as Sir Mohammed Yusuf – Sindhi: سر محمد يوسف; 1876– 15 September 1965), was an early 20th century Indian businessman and philanthropist. He was the proprietor of Bombay Steam Navigation Company. The Yusuf family own vast amounts of land in Mumbai and the vicinity and is one of the ten largest private landowners in Mumbai.

== Life and family ==
Mohamed Yusuf belonged to a Kutchi Memon family which trace his roots to modern Gujarat, and was the only son of Haji Ismail Hasham. In 1894, at the age of 18, he joined his father's company. The Bombay Steam Navigation Company was engaged in trade along the Konkan coast, and Mohammed Yusuf helped his father expand these activities.

In 1910, he obtained Nhava island and subsequently estates in Jogeshwari (Mumbai) from the then British Indian government, on a 999-year lease and established a nautical college (Training Ship Rahaman – 1910), girls' school, dispensary and an educational institute (Ismail Yusuf college – 1923). He founded a school for the sons and orphans of seafarers at Worli in 1910: it was reopened as Lady Khatun Marium School in 1990.

He was knighted in 1914.

He supported the swadeshi movement; was a patron of the Gandharva Mahavidyalaya and was a close friend of its founder Pandit Vishnu Digambar Paluskar. He also collected many books in English, Persian and Urdu on philosophy, literature and the arts in English, Persian and Urdu.

Mohamed Yusuf was married to Khatun Marium and the couple had two sons of whom Abdul Rahaman Yusuf (Sindhi: عبدالرحمان يوسف) was the eldest.

Mohamed Yusuf died on 15 September 1965. He is buried at the family mausoleum at the family house and estate Samandar mahal (Jahaz point, Worli). Ever year, on his death anniversary, a ceremony is performed by the cadets of Training Ship Rahaman at his mausoleum.

== Legacy ==
- Sir Mohamed Yusuf Seamen Welfare Foundation (founded 1910)
- Sir Mohamed Yusuf Trust (1929)
- Training Ship Rahaman (Nhava, India)
- Ismail Yusuf College (Jogeshwari, Mumbai, India)
