= Sunil K. Pandya =

- Born: Sunilkumar Krishnalal Pandya; 1940
- Died: 17 December 2024 (aged 83–84)
- Occupation: Neurosurgeon
- Known for: Head of the Department of Neurosurgery at King Edward Memorial Hospital (KEM) and Seth GS Medical College; Founding member Indian Journal of Medical Ethics

Academic background
- Education: Grant Medical College
- Influences: Homi Minocher Dastur

Academic work
- Institutions: Institute of Neurology, London; KEM and Seth GS Medical College, Mumbai; Jaslok Hospital, Mumbai

Sunil K. Pandya (1940 - 17 December 2024) was an Indian neurosurgeon, ethicist, and medical historian, known for being the head of the Department of Neurosurgery at King Edward Memorial Hospital (KEM) and Seth GS Medical College, Mumbai, and founding the Indian Journal of Medical Ethics.

== Early life and education ==
Sunil K. Pandya was born Sunilkumar Krishnalal Pandya in Santacruz, Mumbai, on 11 February 1940. In 1961 he graduated in medicine from Grant Medical College, where he also completed his internship, residency, and Master of Surgery in 1965.

== Career ==
In 1974, with a Commonwealth medical scholarship, Pandya trained under Valentine Logue at the Institute of Neurology in London, where he was also taught by Majid Samii and Gazi Yaşargil. He returned to India after a year to take up a post at the King Edward Memorial Hospital (KEM), Mumbai, in 1975. There, commonly known as Dr SKP, he worked for a few years with Homi Minocher Dastur, and remained there for 23 years. His contributions to neurosurgery included microneurosurgery in general and vascular surgery. He was appointed KEM's chair of Medical Humanities, a post created following the death of KEM's head of anatomy, Manu Kothari.

Pandya co-founded the journal Issues in Medical Ethics, a precursor of the Indian Journal of Medical Ethics, which he edited for several years. He was also on the editorial boards of the National Medical Journal of India and the Men's Sana Monographs. His interest in history of medicine was influenced by KEM's Ashok Vaidya and Samuel J. Aptekar of the Gokuldas Tejpal Hospital. This interest made him a follower of the works of Sir William Osler. He later contributed to an encyclopaedia on Osler.

After retiring from KEM in 1998, Pandya joined Jaslok Hospital. His book Human Behaviour looks at what shapes how people act, explaining normal and unusual behaviour through a mix of genetics and life experiences.

== Death ==
Pandya died from interstitial lung disease on 17 December 2024. He was survived by his wife Subha, an electrophysiologist, and two children.

== Selected publications ==
- Pandya, Sunilk (January 2011). "Understanding brain, mind and soul: contributions from neurology and neurosurgery". Mens Sana Monographs. 9 (1): 129–149. doi:10.4103/0973-1229.77431 (inactive 1 July 2025). ISSN 1998-4014. PMC 3115284. PMID 21694966.
- Pandya, Sunil K. (1 April 2014). "The Medical Council of India: need for a total overhaul". Indian Journal of Medical Ethics. 11 (2): 68–71. doi:10.20529/IJME.2014.020. ISSN 0974-8466. PMID 24727616.
- Pandya, S. (2015). "As I approach the end of my life…". Journal of Postgraduate Medicine. 61 (4): 217–220. doi:10.4103/0022-3859.166507. ISSN 0022-3859. PMC 4943372. PMID 26440389.
- Pandya, Sunil K. (1 May 2015). "Dr Charles Morehead MD (Edinburgh), FRCP (1807–1882): Pioneer in medical education". Journal of Medical Biography. 23 (2): 73–83. doi:10.1177/0967772013506821. ISSN 0967-7720. PMID 24585609.
- Pandya, Sunil K. (26 December 2024). "Dr Pranjivandas Manekchand Mehta MD, MS, FCPS 1889–1981 and Caraka Samhita (1949)". Journal of Medical Biography 09677720241304740. doi:10.1177/09677720241304740. ISSN 0967-7720. PMID 39726131. (Biographical account of Pranjivandas Manekchand Mehta)
