= P.L. Deshpande garden =

P.L. Deshpande garden is a project initiated by the Pune Municipal Corporation. It covers 12 acres of land, and is also known as the Japanese Garden. It is located on Sinhgad Road, in Pune, Maharashtra.

== See also ==
- Pune-Okayama Friendship Garden
