= Husain Dalwai =

Indian politician

Member of Parliament of Rajya Sabha
- In office 3 April 2014 – 2 April 2020
- Succeeded by: Rajiv Satav
- In office 2011–2014
- Preceded by: Prithviraj Chavan
- Constituency: Maharashtra

Minister of Labour, Waqf and Minor Ports, Government of Maharashtra
- In office Oct. 1999 – March 2001

Member of Maharashtra Legislative Council
- In office June 2010 – Aug. 2011
- In office Jan. 1998 – Dec. 2003

Personal details
- Born: 15 February 1943 (age 83) Mirjoli, Bombay Presidency, British India
- Party: Indian National Congress
- Spouse: Shama Dalwai
- Relations: Hamid Dalwai (Brother)
- Parent(s): Shrimati Hafija Umar Dalwai and Shri Umar Khan Dalwai
- Education: MA (Sociology)
- Alma mater: University of Mumbai
- Occupation: Industrial Worker, Trade Unionist, Journalist, Writer, Political and Social Worker

Husain Dalwai (born 15 February 1943) is an Indian politician from Indian National Congress party.

Dalwai is a trade unionist, journalist and writer by profession. He represented Congress Party in Maharashtra Legislative Council from 1998 to 2003. During this term, he was also a minister from Oct 1999 to March 2001. In June 2010 he was again elected to Maharashtra Legislative Council from Indian National Congress; his term lasted until August 2011. He was elected from Maharashtra to the Rajya Sabha, the upper house of the Parliament from 2011 to 2014. He was elected to Rajya Sabha for second term from Maharashtra, from April 2014 to April 2020.

His brother was Hamid Dalwai.

== Positions held ==
In Parliament, Mr. Dalwai served on the following committees:

- Member, Committee on Rural Development (Aug. 2011- Aug. 2012)
- Member, Central Advisory Committee for the National Cadet Corps (Dec. 2011 - Dec. 2013)
- Member, Committee on Railways (Aug. 2012 - May 2014)
- Member, Committee on Petitions April 2014 (May 2013 - Sept. 2014)
- Member, Committee on Urban Development (Sept. 2014 – present)
- Member, Committee on Government Assurances (Sept. 2014 – present)
