= Marathi Language Day =

Day honouring the language

Marathi Language Day is either of the two popular days being celebrated in the Indian state of Maharashtra where Marathi language is primarily spoken.

- 1 May - "Marathi Official Language Day" (मराठी राजभाषा दिन)
- 27 February - "Marathi Language Pride Day" (मराठी भाषा गौरव दिन)

== 1 May ==
On 1 May 1960, the erstwhile Bombay State was divided into the current states of Maharashtra and Gujarat based on primary spoken languages as Marathi and Gujarati. The day is hence also celebrated in Maharashtra as Maharashtra Day (महाराष्ट्र दिन) and is observed as state holiday. Marathi thus became the "Official Language" of the state from 1 May 1960. The Government of Maharashtra issued notice on 5 July 1960 establishing Directorate of Languages. As per "Maharashtra Official Language Act 1964", Marathi language officially received the status of Official Language. From 1 May 1966, the Marathi Official Language Act was implemented in all government affairs in the state. Book title Introduction to Raj Bhasha was also published for non-Marathi speaking government officials. However, in due course of time, due to the fanfare celebrations of Maharashtra Day and Labour Day; both being observed on 1 May, the Marathi Official Language Day celebrations had reduced and also being ignored by government bodies. On 10 April 1977, the government issued another circular about reminder of this day and its observances. In the revived events, various functions and competitions were encouraged to be arranged on local levels from 28 April to 30 April with conclusion ceremonies held on 1 May.

== 27 February ==
Vishnu Vaman Shirwadkar, popularly known by his pen name, Kusumagraj, was a celebrated Marathi author who was honoured with Jnanpith Award in 1987. He made significant contribution in the cultural field of Maharashtra and tireless efforts to make Marathi the language of knowledge. On 21 January 2013, Maharashtra Government issued circular to celebrate 27 February, birthday of Kusumagraj, as "Marathi Language Pride Day".

== Celebrations ==
Essay competitions and seminars are arranged in Schools and Colleges. Government officials are asked to conduct various events.
