= Satish Dubhashi =

Indian actor

- Occupations: Stage and film actor

Satish Dubhashi (सतीश दुभाषी) was an Indian actor known for his roles in the Marathi language movies and Marathi theatre.

== Stage career ==
Dubhashi acted in the role of Natsamrat in noted Marathi playwright Kusumagraj’s iconic & milestone Marathi play "Natsamrat" after Dr. Shriram Lagoo. In the play written by P. L. Deshpande "Ti Phulrani" which had become very popular during 70s, Bhakti Barve had performed the title role opposite Satish Dubhashi.

== Film career ==
Dubhashi's notable movie roles include the one of pragmatic union leader D’Costa (reportedly based on George Fernandes) in the 1979 Marathi political drama movie Sinhasan directed by Jabbar Patel. He also acted in the 1973 English movie "Birbal My Brother".

=== Films ===
- Sinhasan सिंहासन (1979)
- Bala Gau Kashi Angai बाळा गाऊ कशी अंगाई
- Birbal my brother (1973)
- Chandoba chandoba bhaglas ka चांदोबा चांदोबा भागलास का

== Personal life ==
Dubhashi was the maternal cousin of the veteran Marathi writer and humorist P.L.Deshpande. His paternal grandfather, Vaman Mangesh Dubhashi, was a poet and connoisseur of literature, who was also the founder of Hindu High School located in Karwar.
