= Dipika Chikhlia =

Indian television actress (born 1965)

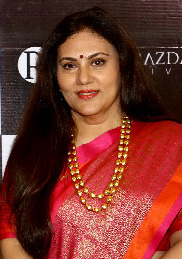
- Chikhlia in 2021

Member of Parliament, Lok Sabha
- In office 1991–1996
- Preceded by: Prakash Brahmbhatt
- Succeeded by: Satyajitsinh Gaekwad
- Constituency: Baroda, Gujarat

Personal details
- Born: 29 April 1965 (age 61) Bombay, Maharashtra, India
- Party: Bharatiya Janata Party
- Spouse: Hemant Topiwala (m. 1991)
- Children: Nidhi Topiwala (daughter); Juhi Topiwala (daughter)
- Parent: Rajesh Chikhalia (father)
- Occupation: Actress; politician

Dipika Chikhlia Topiwala (born 29 April 1965) is an Indian actress and politician best known for playing Sita in Ramanand Sagar's 1987 television series Ramayan. She made her debut with Sun Meri Laila (1983), opposite Raj Kiran. She made three Hindi films with Rajesh Khanna, Rupaye Dus Karod, Ghar Ka Chiraag and Khudai.

She did one Malayalam film Ithile Iniyum Varu (1986), with Mammootty, her Kannada hits were Hosa Jeevana (1990) with Shankar Nag and Indrajith (1989) with Ambareesh. She had one Tamil hit film, Naangal (1992), with Prabhu, and one Bengali hit film, Asha O Bhalobasha (1989), opposite Prosenjit Chatterjee.

== Career ==
=== Early career ===
Chikhlia made her debut as lead actress in Sun Meri Laila (1983), opposite Raj Kiran. She was part of the television serial Dada Daadi Ki Kahani in 1985. She also did supporting roles in hit films like Bhagwan Dada (1986), Kala Dhanda Goray Log (1986) and Doorie (1989) and played lead heroine in the horror film Cheekh (1986) and Raat Ke Andhere Mein (1987).

=== Success (1987-95) ===
Later in 1987, Chikhlia played the female lead role of Sita in Ramanand Sagar's television series Ramayan. Before starring in Ramayan, she was the part of Ramanand Sagar's Vikram Aur Betaal. She continued getting lead roles in hit TV serials like The Sword of Tipu Sultan and Luv Kush (both in 1989). Her only hits in Hindi films were Ghar Ka Chiraag (1989) and Rupaye Dus Karod (1991), both of which had Rajesh Khanna in the lead. She got more footage in the film Khudai, but the film was a commercial failure in 1994. She played the romantic lead of Rajesh Khanna in two films, Ghar Ka Chiraag and Khudai. Her Kannada film, Hosa Jeevana, as the lead heroine opposite Shankar Nag was a box office hit in 1990 and her Bengali films Asha O Bhalobasha (1989), opposite Prosenjit Chatterjee and Tamil film Naangal (1992) opposite Prabhu were box office hits. She also got a supporting role in a Malayalam movie, Ithile Iniyum Varu (1986), which had Mammootty in the lead. She met with limited success in Hindi films after 1992, as Sanam Aap Ki Khatir (1992) flopped, which had her as main lead heroine, she only got supporting roles in Hindi films.

=== Later career ===
Chikhlia was also seen in the TV serial Chutta Chheda (2017) on Colors Gujarati channel. The Gujarati film Natsamrat (2018 film) was released in 2018.

She was last seen in the movie Bala as Pari's (Yami Gautam) mother. In 2020, she was in talks to play the freedom fighter Sarojini Naidu.

In August 2023, she has turned producer with the TV show Dhartiputra Nandini.

== Politics ==
Dipika Chikhlia Topiwala followed up her television and film career with a move into politics, becoming a Member of Parliament in the Indian Lok Sabha from Baroda constituency in 1991 as a Bharatiya Janata Party candidate.

== Personal life ==
On 23 November 1991, Dipika married Hemant Topiwala, owner of Shingar Bindi and Tips and Toes Cosmetics. They have two daughters: Nidhi Topiwala and Juhi Topiwala.

== Filmography ==
=== Film ===
| Year | Film | Language | Role | Notes |
|---|---|---|---|---|
| 1983 | Sun Meri Laila | Hindi | | |
| 1985 | Paththar | Hindi | Chameli | |
| 1986 | Cheekh | Hindi | | |
| 1986 | Bhagwaan Dada | Hindi | Shanti | |
| 1986 | Ghar Sansar | Hindi | | |
| 1986 | Ithile Iniyum Varu | Malayalam | Priya | |
| 1987 | Raat Ke Andhere Mein | Hindi | | |
| 1987 | Sajanwa Bairi Bhaile Hamar | Bhojpuri | | |
| 1989 | Indrajith | Kannada | Usha | |
| 1989 | Ghar Ka Chiraag | Hindi | Asha | |
| 1989 | Asha O Bhalobasha | Bengali | Rupa | |
| 1989 | Yamapasam | Telugu | | |
| 1990 | Hosa Jeevana | Kannada | Sita as wife of Shankarnag | |
| 1990 | Periya Idathu Pillai | Tamil | | |
| 1991 | Kaala Chakra | Kannada | | |
| 1991 | Brahmarshi Viswamitra | Telugu | | |
| 1991 | Rupaye Dus Karod | Hindi | Ravi's secretary/Hastinapur Ki Rani | |
| 1992 | Naangal | Tamil | | |
| 1994 | Mayor Prabhakar | Kannada | | |
| 1994 | Khudai | Hindi | Padmini Raj Anand | |
| 1989 | Jode Rahejo Raj | Gujarati | | |
| 1992 | Laju Lakhan | Gujarati | | |
| 2018 | Gaalib | Hindi | | |
| 2018 | Natsamrat | Gujarati | | |
| 2019 | Bala | Hindi | Susheela Mishra (Pari's Mother) | |
| 2022 | Hindutva Chapter One - Main Hindu Hoon | Hindi | Guru Maa | |
| 2026 | Veer Murarbaji | Marathi; Hindi | Jijabai | |

=== Television ===
| Year | Show | Role | Notes | ref. |
|---|---|---|---|---|
| 1985 | Vikram Betal | Episodic Roles | | |
| 1987 | Ramayan | Devi Lakshmi | | |
| 1987–1988 | Ramayan | Sita | | |
| 1988–1989 | Luv Kush | Sita | | |
| 1990 | The Sword of Tipu Sultan | Fatima Fakhrun Nisa | Tipu Sultan's mother | |
| 2023–2024 | Dhartiputra Nandini | Sumitra Bharadwaj | | |
Special Appearance
| 2020 | The Kapil Sharma Show | Herself | as guest | |
| 2020 | India's Best Dancer season 1 | Herself | as guest | |
| 2022 | Jhalak Dikhhla Jaa 10 | Herself | as guest | |
