= Benaam Badsha =

- Poster
- Directed by: K. Ravi Shankar
- Screenplay by: Iqbal Durrani
- Based on: Pudhea Paadhai by R. Parthiban
- Produced by: A. Krishnamoorthi (presenter); K. Ramji
- Starring: Anil Kapoor; Juhi Chawla; Shilpa Shirodkar
- Cinematography: K.V. Ramanna
- Edited by: Waman Bhonsle; Gurudutt Shirali
- Music by: Laxmikant–Pyarelal
- Production company: Tina Films International
- Release date: 19 April 1991
- Country: India
- Language: Hindi

Benaam Badsha (transl. The Nameless Emperor) is a 1991 Indian Hindi-language crime drama film directed by K. Ravi Shankar, produced by K. Ramji and story by R Parthiban. It stars Anil Kapoor, Juhi Chawla and Shilpa Shirodkar in pivotal roles. The film was a moderate critical and commercial success, and the fourteenth highest grossing Indian film of 1991. This was a remake of the Tamil film Pudhea Paadhai.

== Plot ==
Found in a garbage bin, abandoned by his biological parents, a young man grows up to be a paid assassin, kidnapper, and rapist. One of his rape victims is Jyoti, who is raped on the day of her marriage to a doctor groom. Her life ruined, unwed, she decides to convince her rapist to marry her, and goes to live in his neighborhood. Her rapist will not marry her but, she continues to pursue her goal, and after feigning a pregnancy, she does convince him to allow her to move in with him – amongst ruins, without a roof. She soon starts to transform him, with considerable success. She names him Deepak, so that he has a name others can call him by. Deepak receives a contract to kill Kaameshwari by Jaikal. Deepak refuses to take this contract, and shortly thereafter, he is arrested by the police for Kaameshwari's death. With a background such as his, will he be able to convince the authorities that he was not involved in her death, and that he was framed for it?

== Cast ==
- Anil Kapoor ... Deepak
- Juhi Chawla ... Jyoti
- Shilpa Shirodkar ... Bijli
- Amrish Puri ... Minister Jaikal
- Rohini Hattangadi ... Kaameshwari
- Sudhir Pandey ... Abhinandan Tiwari
- Viju Khote ... Hotel Security Guard
- Ashok Saraf ... Vinay Chandra 'VCR' Rathod
- Yunus Parvez....Munshi of Jaikaal
- Mahavir Shah ... Inspector Satyaprakash Verma
- Satish Shah....Ganpat
- Rakesh Bedi ... Kaushik ,Ganpat's nephew
- Ravindra Kapoor..... Jyoti's Dad
- Shashi Puri ... as Doctor/Jyoti's Groom
- Seema Deo ... Savitri Maa

== Soundtrack ==
Song	Singer
"Duja Koi Roye Use"	Mohammed Aziz
"O Mata Ke Ladle Soja"	S. P. Balasubrahmanyam, Kavita Krishnamurthy
"O Moochwale"	Kavita Krishnamurthy
"Mera Kunwara Padosi Sota Nahin"	Kavita Krishnamurthy, Amit Kumar
"Aish Karo"	Amit Kumar
