= Indrajith (1989 film) =

- Directed by: K. V. Raju
- Written by: K. V. Raju
- Produced by: Sudheer Kamath; Doulat Bhatia
- Starring: Ambareesh; Deepika Chikhalia; Devaraj
- Cinematography: J. G. Krishna
- Edited by: S. Manohar
- Music by: Hamsalekha
- Production company: Manthralaya Chitra
- Release date: 12 June 1989
- Running time: 134 minutes
- Country: India
- Language: Kannada

Indrajith is a 1989 Indian Kannada-language film directed and written by K. V. Raju. The film stars Ambareesh and Deepika, with Devaraj, Shashikumar and Keerthi in supporting roles. The music and lyrics of the film were composed and written by Hamsalekha.

== Plot ==
Indrajith, an honest cop, is betrayed, accused of bribery and thrown behind bars when he investigates a high-profile case related to an influential gangster. Upon release, he reunites with his wife and his son (who has been brought up by an old friend). He teams up with Fernandez, a handicapped police informant and a betrayed ex-cop, and develops an army of youngsters to battle corruption and seek revenge.

== Cast ==
- Ambareesh as Indrajith
- Deepika
- Devaraj as Fernandis
- Shashikumar
- Mukhyamantri Chandru
- Doddanna
- Lohitashwa
- Keerthi
- Disco Shanti
- Sathyajith
- Rama murthy
- Rajaram. H. S.

== Production ==
Actor Devaraj explained in a later interview that, while the first three films in which he had roles were never released, his role as a police officer in the film Indrajith paved the way for his career in later films.

== Soundtrack ==
The music was composed and lyrics written by Hamsalekha. The love duet song "Belli Rathadali" was immensely popular and considered one of the evergreen songs.

Track listing
No.	Title	Lyrics	Singer(s)	Length
1.	"Belli Rathadali Surya"	Hamsalekha and KV Raju	S. P. Balasubrahmanyam, B. R. Chaya
2.	"Kadaligu Ondu Kone Ide"	Hamsalekha	S. P. Balasubrahmanyam, Chandrika Gururaj
3.	"O Sundari"	Hamsalekha	S. P. Balasubrahmanyam, P. Susheela
4.	"Baari Suddiyallide"	Hamsalekha	Manjula Gururaj
5.	"Baaro Nanna Geleya"	Hamsalekha	S. P. Balasubrahmanyam
