= Hosa Jeevana =

- VCD cover
- Directed by: H. R. Bhargava
- Written by: Kunigal Nagabhushan {dialogues}
- Screenplay by: H. R. Bhargava
- Story by: R. Parthiban
- Based on: Pudhea Paadhai (Tamil)(1989) by R. Parthiban
- Produced by: S. Shailendra Babu
- Starring: Shankar Nag; Deepika Chikhalia; Ramesh Bhat; Sudheer
- Cinematography: Mallikarjuna
- Edited by: Victor Yadav
- Music by: Hamsalekha
- Production company: Shruthi Enterprises
- Distributed by: Shruthi Enterprises
- Release date: 26 July 1990
- Running time: 145 minutes
- Country: India
- Language: Kannada

Hosa Jeevana (transl. New Life) is a 1990 Indian Kannada film, directed by H. R. Bhargava and produced by S. Shailendra Babu. The film stars Shankar Nag, Deepika, Ramesh Bhat and Sudheer. The film has a musical score composed by Hamsalekha. The film was a remake of 1989 Tamil film Pudhea Paadhai.

== Plot synopsis ==
A ruthless ruffian rapes an innocent woman, which traumatizes her. However, due to that rape victim, he gets reformed into a better human being.

== Cast ==
- Shankar Nag as Seetharam
- Deepika Chikhalia as Sita
- Ramesh Bhat
- Sudheer
- Mukhyamantri Chandru as Subbayya
- Rajanand
- Kunigal Nagabhushan
- Mysore Lokesh as Nayak
- Bangalore Nagesh
- M. S. Karanth as police inspector
- Shani Mahadevappa as postman
- M. S. Umesh as Mahadeva
- B. K. Shankar
- Negro Johnny
- Vaishali Kasaravalli as Rukku
- Sathyapriya
- Sumathishree
- Sarvamangala
- Sheela
- Radha
- Srishaila
- Chikkanna
- Rathnakar
- Bank Janardhan as traffic cop
- Ramachandra
- Kuyili
- Master Ravindra KC as Hanuma
- Master Anand
- Master Vishwas

== Soundtrack ==
All songs composed and written by Hamsalekha.

- Chaaku Chainu – S.P. Balasubrahmanyam
- Byadve Byadve – S.P. Balasubrahmanyam & Manjula Gururaj
- Laali Laali – S.P. Balasubrahmanyam & Manjula Gururaj
- Anatha Maguvaade – K. J. Yesudas & Chandrika Gururaj
