= Muslim Satyashodhak Mandal =

Muslim Satyashodhak Mandal is an organization founded on 22 March 1970 by Hamid Dalwai (1932–1977) during a meeting of Muslim youth in Pune, India. The organization was created to foster social awareness and reform within the Indian Muslim community. Following the founder's death, his wife, Mehrunnisa Dalwai, continued his work in Bombay.

== Objectives ==
The organization primarily focuses on social reform within the Muslim community. Its key objectives include promoting secular values, national integration, and a scientific outlook; eradicating superstition and curbing separatist tendencies; and lastly, securing equal rights for women. The organization derives its inspiration from the ideas of social reformers Mahatma Phule, Gopal Ganesh Agarkar, and Maharshi Karve.

== Activities and initiatives ==
While the organization focuses significantly on issues affecting divorced Muslim women, it also campaigns for the implementation of a Uniform Civil Code, advocates for education in regional languages for Muslims, and promotes family planning. To achieve its goals, the group utilizes petitions, demonstrations, seminars, conferences, conventions, camps, and resolutions, as well as public protests, marches, and distributions of leaflets.

Notable events and initiatives by the organization include:

- 1971: Convened the "All India Forward-Looking Muslim Conference" in Delhi, featuring representatives from Maharashtra, Andhra Pradesh, West Bengal, and Delhi. A resolution requesting a Uniform Civil Code was passed during this event.
- 1973: Passed a resolution at the Muslim Education Conference in Kolhapur advocating that Muslims receive education in their respective regional languages.
- 1975: Launched the "Jihad-e-Talaq" movement under General Secretary Sayyadbhai, demanding legal protection for divorced women and their children.
- 23 November 1975: Organized a conference in Pune specifically for divorced Muslim women.
- 1980: Established a hostel in Kolhapur for the children of divorced women, initiated by Hussein Jamaddar.
- 1982: Opened the Muslim Women's Help Centre in Pune.
- 1984: Conducted family planning camps in Amravati under the leadership of activist Shaikh Wajir Patel, leading to approximately 5,000 surgical procedures.
- July 1984: Activist Akhtarunnisa Sayyid submitted a petition to the Supreme Court regarding adoption matters.

The group has provided livelihood support to needy and divorced Muslim women. Additionally, member Raziya Patel led a protest movement against bans imposed on women viewing films by conservative elements. The organization also welcomed the Indian Central Government's proposal to establish family courts and recommended extending those services to Muslim women.

== Founder ==
The founder of the organization, Hamid Dalwai, was a Marathi author who wrote literary works alongside analytical and ideological books, including the 1970 English book Muslim Politics in Secular India.

In 1966, Dalwai led a march of Muslim women in Mumbai to protest against oral divorce (jabani talaq) and polygamy. He was involved in establishing the Indian Secular Society in 1968. In 1976, he attended the World Unity Conference in the United States as a representative, during which he also visited England, France, and Germany.

== Branches ==
As of 1999, the organization operates primarily in the state of Maharashtra, maintaining branches in Pune, Mumbai, Kolhapur, Solapur, Ahmednagar, Shrigonda, Phaltan, Amravati, Achalpur, Paratwada and Chhatrapati Sambhajinagar (Aurangabad).
