= Pudhea Paadhai =

1989 film by R. Parthiepan

- Theatrical release poster
- Directed by: R. Parthiban
- Written by: R. Parthiban
- Produced by: A. Sundaram
- Starring: R. Parthiban; Seetha
- Cinematography: A. Rajpreet
- Edited by: M. N. Raja
- Music by: Chandrabose
- Production company: Vivekchitra
- Release date: 14 April 1989
- Running time: 116 minutes
- Country: India
- Language: Tamil
- Budget: ₹3.8 million

Pudhea Paadhai (transl. New Path) is a 1989 Indian Tamil-language crime drama film written and directed by R. Parthiban in his directorial debut. The film stars Parthiban as an inhumane ruffian who gets reformed by his rape victim (Seetha), while V. K. Ramasamy, Manorama, Nassar, Sridhar, Kuyili and Sathyapriya appear in supporting roles.

Pudhea Paadhai was released on 14 April 1989 and emerged a box-office success, while also winning several accolades including two National Film Awards, and two Tamil Nadu State Film Awards. It was remade in Kannada in 1990 as Hosa Jeevana, in Hindi in 1991 as Benaam Badsha, in 1991 in Telugu as Rowdy Gaari Pellam and in 1996 in Malayalam as Swarnakireedam.

== Plot ==
An unnamed orphan who was abandoned on a garbage heap soon after his birth, grows up to be a ruffian who would do anything for money. On one occasion, he rapes Seetha, a bride-to-be, on the eve of her wedding at the instruction of Annapoorani, who had been arrested after Seetha had earlier exposed her malpractices in running an orphanage. Though the sympathetic bridegroom offers to marry Seetha, she declines his offer. Instead, she takes residence in the house of Aaya, who lives in the same slum as the ruffian. She attempts to develop the ruffian's acquaintance, much to everyone's disbelief. Their constant confrontations bring about a chemistry in their relationship. She narrates to the people in the area how he molested her and the sequences which forced her to leave her father and live in the slum. They sympathise with her and everyone feels that the ruffian has to accept her as he is responsible for her present pitiable condition. Consequently, Seetha moves into his house. Her tender love and affection eventually leads to their marriage. Seetha advises him to shed the path of violence and reform himself. He is named Seetharaman.

Seetharaman slowly changes and tries to work hard in a righteous way to run his family. Seetha later gives birth to his son. However, Seetharaman's past sins do not spare him. Thoguthi, for whom Seetharaman previously worked, kills Annapoorani when she demands her share from his illegal gains. Seetharaman is arrested as he was working for Thoguthi earlier. To get exonerated, he is forced to become an approver and report Thoguthi's activities. Thoguthi decides to kill Seetharaman to halt his appearance in court. He plants a bomb in a lunchbox (identical to the one sent by Seetha to Seetharaman) and replaces it with the original. The bomb is planted in such a way that it would explode immediately when the lunchbox is opened. Seetharaman, busy working for extra money to buy a gift for Seetha and their wedding anniversary, does not have lunch. He returns with the lunchbox and leaves to visit the temple with Seetha. When Seetha returns home to take her child's feeding bottle which she had forgotten, she opens the lunchbox out of curiosity, expecting a gift from her husband, and dies in the ensuing explosion. Enraged, Seetharaman attacks and almost kills Thoguthi, but his child's cries remind him of his responsibilities, so he spares Thoguthi's life. Thoguthi chases Seetharaman, but is struck to death by a vehicle. Seetharaman leaves with his child and brings him up.

== Cast ==
- R. Parthiban as Seetharaman
- Seetha as Seetha
- V. K. Ramasamy
- Manorama as Aaya
- Nassar as Thoguthi
- Sridhar as Doctor
- Kuyili as Kuyili
- Sathyapriya as Annapoorani
- Vennira Aadai Moorthy
- Idichapuli Selvaraj
- Theni Kunjarammal

== Production ==
Parthiban, an erstwhile assistant of K. Bhagyaraj made his directorial debut with this film. The film was initially titled as Kelvikkuri with Babji of Hemnag films producing it. However, after shooting for three days, it was stopped. Babji advised Parthiban to tell the story to A. Sundaram, a popular distributor. Sundaram liked the script and decided to produce the film. They went to Rajinikanth, who suggested Parthiban to play the hero. Though Parthiban was keen on choosing another actor (Arjun or Sathyaraj) for the leading role, Sundaram wanted him to play the role considering what Rajinikanth said and the budget. Sundaram wanted a different title, he then selected Pudhea Paadhai from the 50 titles shortlisted. The film was made on a budget of ₹38 lakh (worth ₹11 crore in 2021 prices) and filming was completed within 50 days. Parthiban initially approached Khushbu to portray the lead actress, but the producer did not accept as she was not fluent in Tamil at the time; the role went to Seetha. Cinematography was handled by A. Rajpreet, and editing by M. N. Raja.

== Soundtrack ==
The soundtrack was composed by Chandrabose, and all songs were penned by Vairamuthu.

Track listing
No.	Title	Singer(s)	Length
1.	"Yarappathiyum"	S. P. Balasubrahmanyam	3:36
2.	"Appan Yaru"	K. J. Yesudas	4:36
3.	"Thalaiva"	S. P. Balasubrahmanyam, Vani Jairam	5:06
4.	"Pachaippulla"	S. P. Balasubrahmanyam, Vani Jairam	4.26
5.	"Kannadicha"	S. P. Balasubrahmanyam, S. P. Sailaja	4:34
Total length:			22:18

== Release and reception ==
Pudhea Paadhai was released on 14 April 1989, Puthandu. Despite facing competition from other Puthandu releases such as Apoorva Sagodharargal, En Rathathin Rathame and Pillaikkaga, the film became a commercial success. P. S. S. of Kalki positively reviewed the film, particularly for Parthiban and Chandrabose's contributions.

== Accolades ==
Event	Category	Recipient	Ref.
Tamil Nadu State Film Awards	Best Film	A. Sundaram	
Tamil Nadu State Film Awards	Best Story Writer	R. Parthiban	
National Film Awards	Best Tamil Feature Film	A. Sundaram	
National Film Awards	Best Actress in a Supporting Role	Manorama	

== Remakes ==
The film was remade in Kannada as Hosa Jeevana (1990), in Hindi as Benaam Badsha (1991), in Telugu as Rowdy Gaari Pellam (1991), and in Malayalam as Swarnakireedam (1996).

== Bibliography ==
- Arunachalam, Param (2019). BollySwar: 1991–2000. Mavrix Infotech. ISBN 9788193848210.
- Dhananjayan, G. (2014). Pride of Tamil Cinema: 1931–2013. Blue Ocean Publishers. OCLC 898765509.
