= Rupaye Dus Karod =

- Promotional Poster
- Directed by: Sikander Bharti
- Produced by: Waman K. Dehsmukh
- Starring: Rajesh Khanna; Chunky Pandey; Amrita Singh; Sonu Walia
- Music by: Bappi Lahiri
- Release date: 29 November 1991
- Country: India
- Language: Hindi

Rupaye Dus Karod is a 1991 Indian Hindi-language thriller film directed by Sikander Bharti, produced by Waman K. Deshmukh and written by Shabdh Kumar. The film was made in the style of formula-based potboilers and was a hit. It stars Rajesh Khanna in the lead role and the supporting cast includes Chunky Pandey, Amrita Singh, Sonu Walia, Avinash Wadhavan, Deepika Chikhalia, Kiran Kumar, Sadashiv Amrapurkar. It was the 11th highest-grossing film of the year 1991.

Rupaye Dus Karod (ten crores of rupees) is the story of a detective novelist (writing in Hindi) - Ravi Varma (Rajesh Khanna), whose father had to flee from India in his childhood because of a conspiracy masterminded by his wicked business partners and later Ravi finds himself in mystery murder and another plot that tried to earn 10 crores by fraudulent means.

== Plot ==
Chamanlal and Aatmaram were partners with Jamuna Das and Babubhai, but when Atmaram discovers that the core business is selling women abroad for prostitution, he breaks away from this partnership and tells the wife of Chamanlal. Chamanlal's wife confronts him, but Chamanlal is steadfast and decides not to leave the business. In an extreme reaction, his wife leaves the house along with her son and clothes to start a living on her own. Chamanlal keeps thinking about this matter and decides to meet his other two partners to convey that he feels this business is unethical, that he cares for his family's sentiments more and asks for his final share before parting ways. But because of a conspiracy masterminded by his wicked business partners, Chamanlal presumes he killed Babubhai and the prime witness to this supposed murder - Vakil Jamuna Das, asks Chamanlal to flee, but at the same time informs the police to search for him. Chamanlal searches for his wife and son, but cannot locate them and so he informs Atmaram that now he has reformed and that he needs to search for his son and wife who have left him. He also tells Atmaram that he is innocent and wants to escape. Meanwhile, after reading in newspapers about police searching for Chamanlal and that Chamanalal has died in an accident, his wife considers herself a widower and brings up her only child by tailoring.

20 years later, Vakil Jamuna Das learns that Chamanlal is alive, has made it big in Singapore, has made investments abroad and plans to transfer them to his wife and son, after searching for them extensively in India. Chamanlal decides to transfer 10 crores to RBI in such an arrangement that only his own family members will get an access to the fund. Brought up by his mother, Ravi obtains a law degree and becomes a very successful famous criminal lawyer. But after few years, he stops and instead writes Hindi novels of the crime detective genre. His novels achieve popularity within a few years.

Aarthi Saxena has huge crush on Ravi Varma all because of his suspense novels. Aarthi is naive and keeps thinking that all crime cases can be solved in the manner in which Ravi Verma's novels move forward. Ravi Verma's face was never disclosed to the public in the last few years since his novels hit the stores. A media conference is arranged in which his face would be disclosed and a function is arranged where the chief guest is DIG Sharma. In fact, at this function she meets Ravi for the very first time with a toy gun in her hands and shocks the people gathered around Ravi Verma, saying she would kill him if she does not do what she wants. Then she later discloses that she did this only to get an autograph from him. Media and public are shocked to know that famous Lawyer Ravi Verma is the one who writes suspense novels as well. Later, Aarthi becomes friends with Ravi, takes him to their home and introduces him to her father Aatmaram and her brother Vicky. There, Ravi learns that Vicky and his father do not get along well as they keep fighting over Vicky's money spending habits.

Chamanlal's ex-business partners are interested in usurping this huge sum of 10 crores. They are well aware of the talent of Ravi Varma and therefore, they hire his services to draw a scheme so that this money could be usurped by them. For compelling him to do this job for them, they kidnap his mother and threaten to kill her, not knowing that both Ravi and his mother are related to Chamanlal. Ravi agrees to work for them, but at the same time devises a scheme such that he saves his mother and ensures that the money does not get into the hands of the unscrupulous people. First, he decides to appoint a trusted friend, who is looking for a job, as his secretary (Deepika Chikhalia).

Ravi's first target is following the life of the son of Babubhai – Suraj (Chunky Pandey) - who keeps on chasing skirts and fooling girls, saying he loves them. Suraj keeps a bet with his friends (Paintal and others) that he will make Poonam (Sonu Walia), a club dancer, fall in love with them. He makes Poonam trust her and acts as if he is in love with her. Ravi asks Babubhai, as a part of his plan, to not give pocket expenses to his son Suraj. Later, Ravi ensures Suraj becomes aware of a plan where Suraj can earn 10 crores if Suraj works for a client of Ravi, the Queen of Hastinapur (Deepika Chikalia). Suraj jumps on this offer and agrees to go as per the plan made by Ravi. Meanwhile, Ravi asks his secretary (Deepika Chikalia) to also fall in love with Vicky. Later, Aatmaram finds that Vicky has fallen in love with a prostitute's daughter and this leads to a fight between Vicky and Aatmaram, leading to Vicky leaving the house and Atmaram changing his will and transferring the whole of the properties presently in his name to his daughter Aarthi alone. Vicky is angry at his father, but is not interested in a share of the property. Meanwhile, Ravi asks Suraj to act as if he loves Aarthi and to marry her later so that now that Vicky has been debarred by Aatmaram, the whole of the property of Aatmram would be in the name of Aarthi alone and by this way, by becoming Aarthi's trusted husband, Suraj can later become the proud owner of Atmaram's property. Meanwhile, while trying to woo Aarthi, Suraj starts ignoring Poonam, but Poonam, who is not aware of 2 facts that Suraj never ever fell in love with him and that presently he is also trying to make Aarthi trust him blindly, invites Suraj to her room in the hotel where she dances to celebrate her birthday. But the same night she gets murdered. Aarthi, who is very keen and enthusiastic to become a detective herself is put on an operation by Ravi to provide evidence that Suraj is involved in the murder of Poonam and to start collecting evidence, but convinces Aarthi to not inform DIG Sharma or any police inspector about this.

The 4 youngsters Suraj, Aarthi, Vicky and the secretary to Ravi trust the Lawyer-cum-Novelist Mr. Ravi, so much that they blindly follow his dictates. But this leads to Suraj being accused in the murder of Poonam, and Vicky being suspected of kidnapping or being responsible for Atmaram missing. The rest of the story is about whether Ravi is a mastermind involved in all these events, or is innocent. The story is about unfolding the mystery as to how the things he made the 4 youngsters do, will help in ensuring that Chamanlal's 10 Crores does not go to Vakil Jamuna Das and Babubhai, but to the right person and in ensuring that his own mother does not get into trouble. Who are the real culprits?

== Cast ==
- Rajesh Khanna as Ravi Verma
- Chunky Pandey as Suraj Mehta
- Amrita Singh as Aarti Saxena
- Sonu Walia as Poonam
- Deepika Chikhalia as Rashmi
- Sadashiv Amrapurkar as Advocate Jamnadas
- Avinash Wadhavan as Vikram "Vicky" Saxena
- Kiran Kumar as Babubhai Mehta
- Om Shivpuri as Atmaram
- Sudhir Dalvi as Chamanlal Verma
- Satyen Kappu as IGP Sharma
- Amita Nangia as Dancer in song "Ram Kare Toot Jaaye Rail Gaadi"

== Music ==
Lyrics: Sikandar Bharti

1. "Bandh Khidki Hai" - Chunky Pandey, Sapna Mukherjee
2. "Namak Tere Chehre Ka" - Alka Yagnik, Shabbir Kumar
3. "Jhatka O Haay Jhatka" - Asha Bhosle, Sudesh Bhosle
4. "Namasteji Kahiye Kya Hal Chal Ha" - Anuradha Paudwal, Amit Kumar
5. "Ram Kare Toot Jaaye Rail Gaadi" - Asha Bhosle
