= Sarvasakshi =

- Poster
- Directed by: Ramdas Phutane
- Written by: Ramdas Phutane
- Starring: Smita Patil; Jairam Hardikar; Anjali Paigankar
- Cinematography: Sharad Navle
- Music by: Bhaskar Chandavarkar
- Release date: 1978
- Running time: 135 minutes
- Country: India
- Language: Marathi

Sarvasakshi (transl. Omniscient) is a 1978 Indian Marathi-language film directed by Ramdas Phutane with Smita Patil, Anjali Paigankar and Jairam Hardikar in the lead roles. The black-and-white film was a debut feature of Phutane, a former journalist, art teacher, poet and actor, inaugurating New Indian Cinema productions in Marathi. The film deals with the theme of superstitions of the old India colliding with the medical advancements of the modern world.

== Plot ==
Ravi, a progressive schoolteacher in a small village helps fight an epidemic by getting his students inoculated. He incurs the wrath of local witchdoctor in the process. The witchdoctor gets his chance for revenge when Rekha, the pregnant wife of Ravi comes to him after the death of their child. He demands a human sacrifice. While Rekha dies in childbirth, Ravi is accused of superstitious activity and is ostracized by the villagers. He is, eventually cleared, however.

== Cast ==
- Smita Patil as Sujatha
- Jairam Hardikar as Ravi
- Anjali Paigankar as Rekha
- Nilu Phule
- Shankar Nag as Sujatha's husband (special appearance in the song "Bandhale Mee Bandhale")
- Dilip Kulkarni
- Vijay Joshi Vijay Joshi
- Datta Bhat
- Vilas Rakte Vilas Rakte
- Ram Nagarkar
- Leela Gandhi
- Kamimi Bhatia
