= Hanste Khelte (1984 film) =

- Directed by: Dayanand
- Produced by: Mohan Chitra
- Starring: Mithun Chakraborty; Rakesh Roshan; Zarina Wahab; Raza Murad; Vijayendra Ghatge
- Music by: Govind Naresh
- Release date: 9 March 1984
- Running time: 135 minutes
- Language: Bengali

Haashte Khelte is a 1984 Indian Bengali-language thriller drama film directed by Dayanand, starring Mithun Chakraborty, Rakesh Roshan, Zarina Wahab, Raza Murad and Vijayendra Ghatge.

== Plot ==
It is a murder mystery where misfit buddies who get involve. Three friends suspended from college go to the College dean's residence to treat him a lession. But when they arrive there, they found that someone has already killed the dean. They entangles into the murder mystery.

== Cast ==
- Mithun Chakraborty
- Rakesh Roshan
- Zarina Wahab
- Raza Murad
- Vijayendra Ghatge
- Jagdeep
- Keshto Mukherjee
- Iftekhar
- Shriram Lagoo
- Datta Bhat
- Asha Sachdev
- Asit Sen

== Soundtrack ==
1. "Arre Pyaar Kiya Hai Karenge" - Kishore Kumar, Sulakshana Pandit
2. "Hai Jung Ki Raat Yehi" - Bhupinder Singh
3. "Hanste Khelte Hanste Khelte" - Kishore Kumar, Amit Kumar, Suresh Wadkar, Bhupinder Singh, Usha Mangeshkar
4. "Itna Bhi Mann Aazaad" - Bhupinder Singh
5. "Pyaar Ho Gaya Hai Dil Kho Gaya Hai" - Sulakshana Pandit
6. "Pyaar Kiya Hai Karenge Saath Jiyenge Marenge" - Kusum Chauhan
