= Rowdy Gaari Pellam =

- Poster
- Directed by: K. S. Prakash Rao
- Story by: Parthiban
- Based on: Pudhea Paadhai (Tamil)
- Produced by: Mohan Babu
- Starring: Mohan Babu; Shobana
- Cinematography: K. S. Prakash Rao
- Music by: Bappi Lahiri
- Production company: Sree Lakshmi Prasanna Pictures
- Release date: 2 October 1991
- Running time: 129 minutes
- Country: India
- Language: Telugu

Rowdy Gaari Pellam (transl. Rowdy's wife) is a 1991 Indian Telugu-language film directed by K. S. Prakash Rao and produced by Mohan Babu. The film stars Mohan Babu and Shobana. The film was a remake of the 1989 Tamil film Pudhea Paadhai.

== Plot ==
Mohan Babu is a street thug doing petty crimes for a local corrupt politician. The film is about how the street thug (rowdy) ends up being a good samaritan because of his "wife", who he marries after raping her for money offered by villains.

== Cast ==
- Mohan Babu as Rambabu
- Shobana as Janaki
- Narra Venkateswara Rao
- Kota Srinivasa Rao as Kothagiri
- Prasad Babu as Anjali's elder brother
- Annapoorna
- Brahmanandam as Murthy
- Babu Mohan
- Ananth Babu
- Chidathala Appa Rao
- K. K. Sharma
- Chandramouli
- Kakarala
- Jenny
- Rajitha as Indira
- Hema
- Siva Parvathi
- Jayalalita in song Yama Ranju

== Soundtrack ==
Rowdy Gari Pellam

Soundtrack album by Bappi Lahiri
- Released: 1991
- Genre: Telugu
- Length: 25:00
- Producer: Bappi Lahiri

Bappi Lahiri chronology
Rowdy Alludu (1991)	Rowdy Gari Pellam (1991)	Zindagi Ek Jua (1992)

The music was composed by Bappi Lahiri.

No.	Title	Lyrics	Singer(s)	Length
1.	"Yama Ranju"	Gurucharan	S. P. Balasubrahmanyam, K. S. Chithra	5:00
2.	"Kunti Kumari"	Jaladi Raja Rao	K. J. Yesudas	5:00
3.	"A Aale Raanattu"	Sirivennela Seetharama Sastry	S. P. Balasubrahmanyam, K. S. Chithra	5:00
4.	"Boyavani Vetuku"	Gurucharan	K. J. Yesudas	5:04
5.	"Aakundaa Vakkistaa"	Rasaraju	S. P. Balasubrahmanyam, K. S. Chithra	4:56
6.	"Boyavani Vetuku (Sad)"	Gurucharan	K. J. Yesudas
Total length:				25:00
