= Vaman Mangesh Dubhashi =

Marathi writer

- Occupations: Poet, Writer
- Relatives: P.L.Deshpande (grandson); Satish Dubhashi (grandson)

Vaman Mangesh Dubhashi, with the pen name "Rigvedi" or as "Rugvedi" was a Marathi poet and writer from Karwar, India.

== Famous works ==
Dubhashi had translated Rabindranath Tagore's Gitanjali into Marathi under the title "Abhang Gitanjali".

== Hindu High School ==
Dubhashi was the founder and headmaster of Hindu High School located in Karwar.

== Personal life ==
His maternal grandson was veteran Marathi writer and humorist P.L.Deshpande while his paternal grandson was Indian actor Satish Dubhashi.
