= Johnny Bakshi =

Indian film director (1932–2020)

Johnny Bakshi (2 January 1932 – 5 September 2020) was an Indian film director and producer, born in Lahore, Punjab Province, British India.

== Career ==
Bakshi is known for his contribution to the Indian film industry, mainly as a producer. He has produced several popular movies in Bollywood like the 1974 movie Manzilein Aur Bhi Hain, Vishwasghat which released in 1977, 1984's Raavan, Mera Dost Mera Dushman in 1984, Bhairavi in 1996 and Himesh Reshammiya starrer Kajraare in 2010. As a director, he released the 1994 movie Khudai starring Rajesh Khanna and the 1984 film Ravaan.

== Death ==
In early September 2020, Bakshi was admitted to a hospital in Mumbai after he complained of breathlessness. Here, he was diagnosed with pneumonia and tested positive for COVID-19. On 5 September 2020, Bakshi suffered a heart attack and died at the scene, at the age of 88.
