= Naangal =

- Theatrical release poster
- Directed by: Hassan
- Screenplay by: Mahendran
- Story by: Hassan
- Produced by: T. Ajmal Hassan
- Starring: Sivaji Ganesan; Prabhu; Dipika Chikhlia
- Cinematography: J. Williams
- Edited by: K. Sankunni
- Music by: Ilaiyaraaja
- Production company: Arifa Productions
- Release date: 13 March 1992
- Running time: 140 minutes
- Country: India
- Language: Tamil

Naangal (transl. We) is a 1992 Indian Tamil-language film directed by Hassan and written by Mahendran, from a story by the former. The film stars Sivaji Ganesan, Prabhu and Dipika Chikhlia. It was released on 13 March 1992.

== Plot ==
Keerthi, an honest police officer, is charged to solve a double murder case. Keerthi faces up to another police officer Naveen Kumar. Naveen Kumar who hungers for a promotion wants to take charge of this affair. Keerthi and Naveen Kumar finally fight, and the matter is taken up in court. Keerthi hires the lawyer Chaturvedi, a senior lawyer who has never lost a case. Later, Chaturvedi has a heart attack, and the doctor Mona takes care of him. He really likes the way she took care of him, and he now considered her like his own daughter. The doctors Rajasekhar and Mona suspect the hospital running by the doctor Johnson for doing illegal activities. Rajasekhar is later killed by someone, the presumed guilty is Mona according to the fingerprint on the murder weapon. Keerthi and Chaturvedi come to her rescue.

== Cast ==
- Sivaji Ganesan as Chaturvedi
- Prabhu as Keerthi
- Janagaraj as Sundaram
- Deepika Chikhalia as Mona
- Srividya as Lakshmi
- Sarath Babu as Rajasekhar
- Nassar as Johnson
- Captain Raju as Naveen Kumar
- Rajan P. Dev as Rathnaswamy
- Mohan Raj as Maruthi
- Kumarimuthu
- Neelu
- Sivaraman as Senthamizh Nithyanandam
- Sachu
- Sharmili
- Manjupriya
- Aasha
- Rajeshwari
- Ponnambalam
- Sangita as Gayathri
- Oneal Sabu (child actor)

== Soundtrack ==
The music was composed by Ilaiyaraaja.

Song	Singer(s)	Lyrics	Duration
"Maanay Theney"	S. Janaki, Arunmozhi	Vaali	5:13
"Namma Bossu"	Ilaiyaraaja, Malaysia Vasudevan	Vaali	4:37
"Paaradi Kuyile" (Male)	Ilaiyaraaja	Vaali	4:28
"Paaradi Kuyile" (Female)	Swarnalatha	Vaali	4:32
"Paarthathenna Paarvai"	K. S. Chithra, S. P. Balasubrahmanyam	Gangai Amaran	4:51

== Reception ==
N. Krishnaswamy of The Indian Express said, "As the film's script is free from some of the cliches that constantly besiege Tamil films, Naangal is not without its merits as 'time passing' fare".
