= Raavan (1984 film) =

- Directed by: Johnny Bakshi
- Produced by: Johnny Bakshi
- Starring: Smita Patil; Gulshan Arora; Om Puri
- Cinematography: Pravin Bhatt
- Music by: Jagjit Singh, Chitra Singh
- Release date: 1984
- Country: India
- Language: Hindi

Raavan is a 1984 Indian Hindi film produced and directed by Johnny Bakshi. It was one of the first on screen depictions of Ravana.

== Plot synopsis ==
In the Indian epic Ramayana, Vishnu assumes the human form of Rama to end the rule of demon king Ravana, an occasion celebrated among the Hindus as Vijayadashami to mark the triumph of good over evil, and burn giant effigies of Ravana, his son Meghnad (also known as Indrajit after he defeated the king of the gods, Indra), and brother Kumbhakarna. In the distant village of Agar, the villagers gather together to burn the effigies of only Indrajit and Kumbhakarna and let Ravana's alone. The elder of the village explains this unique custom to a news reporter about the love of a woman Ganga (Smita Patil) for a cruel man named Ravana (Gulshan Arora), and how she went about to change this Ravana into a Ram.

== Cast ==
- Smita Patil as Ganga – The resolute protagonist determined to reform a cruel man.
- Gulshan Arora as Raavan – The tyrannical and cruel man feared by the village.
- Vikram Makandar as Nandu
- Om Puri as Samant - the Station Master
