= Jairam Hardikar =

Indian actor

- Died: 5 April 1980
- Occupation: Film Actor

Jairam Hardikar was an Indian actor known for his roles in the Marathi language movies.

== Film career ==
Hardikar's notable movie role was in the 1979 Marathi political drama movie Sinhasan directed by Jabbar Patel. He also acted in the 1978 Marathi movie "Sarvasakshi" opposite the late Smita Patil.
