= Khudai =

- Directed by: Johnny Bakshi
- Story by: Johnny Bakshi
- Produced by: Usman Khan
- Starring: Rajesh Khanna; Madhavi; Deepika Chikhalia
- Music by: Jagjit Singh
- Release date: 1994
- Country: India
- Language: Hindi

Khudai is a 1994 film starring Rajesh Khanna in the main lead. Both Madhavi and Deepika Chikhalia are paired opposite Rajesh Khanna. Other cast includes Gulshan Grover, Arun Bakshi, Avtar Gill.

== Plot ==
Raj Anand is the director of many popular hit movies of Hindi Cinema and lives in India with his wife Padmini and his 22-year-old son Varun. Raj decides to launch Varun in a film named "Nagar Vadhu" (Prostitute) and pair him opposite actress Sakhi. Recently, most of Raj Anand's movies starring actress Sakhi Swami have been declared as epic films. Raj Anand considers Sakhi Swami as one of his best finds and believes that his find can do any role offered to her. In return, even Sakhi is very grateful to Raj Anand and respects Raj and treats him as her Guru. But the media portrays the relation between the director-actress as a man deeply in love with his muse. The age difference between the handsome director and the actress is above 20. It has been the wish of Raj Anand for years that his son Varun should become an actor and that his debut film will be directed by Raj Anand himself. But Varun dislikes acting and therefore Raj persuades Varun to take up acting as a profession. During the making of the debut film of Varun, Sakhi and Varun both fall in love with each other. Reading the rumors of an affair between Raj Anand and Sakhi disturbs Varun, but Padmini has strong faith in her husband and is very confident that her husband does not have any affair with his find and thus their relation remains strong as ever. Padmini gives roses to her husband daily as a ritual whenever Raj leaves for shooting location from home. So the couple's relation never gets spoiled. But after getting to know that his son Varun wants to marry Sakhi, Raj Anand stops the shooting of the film Nagar Vadhu. It's then that Varun comes to believe that his father has been having an illicit relationship with Sakhi for years now and this results in misunderstandings between the father-son duo. The rest of the story is about what happens to Raj and Varun's relationship and whether Sakhi and Varun ever get together and how Raj Anand's career and life and the making of the debut film gets affected due to all these incidents.

== Cast ==
- Rajesh Khanna as Raj Anand
- Madhavi as Sakhi Swami
- Deepika Chikhalia as Padmini Anand
- Gulshan Grover as Bengali Babu

== Music ==
- "Kis Mausam Mein" - - Kumar Sanu
- "Din Aa Gaye Shabab Ke" - Jagjit Singh
- "Ulfat Ka Jab Kisis Ne Liya Naam" - Jagjit Singh
- "Ye Sheeshe Ye Rishte" - Jagjit Singh
- "Hayere Ye Kismat" - Asha Bhosle
- "Kisi Gaav Mein Ek Hasina Thi Koi" - Asha Bhosle
