= Natsamrat =

Natasamrat
- Theatrical release poster
- Directed by: Mahesh Manjrekar
- Written by: Kiran Yadnopavit
- Screenplay by: Mahesh Manjrekar, Abhijeet Deshpande and Kiran Yadnopavit
- Story by: V. V. Shirwadkar
- Based on: Natasamrat by V. V. Shirwadkar
- Produced by: Nana Patekar; Vishwas Joshi
- Starring: Nana Patekar; Medha Manjrekar; Vikram Gokhale; Mrunmayee Deshpande; Sunil Barve; Ajit Parab
- Cinematography: Ajith V. Reddy
- Edited by: Paresh Manjrekar
- Music by: Ajit Parab
- Production companies: Fincraft Media and Entertainment Pvt. Ltd.; Gajanan Chitra; Great Maratha Entertainment
- Distributed by: Zee Studios
- Release date: 1 January 2016 (India)
- Running time: 166 minutes
- Country: India
- Language: Marathi
- Budget: est.₹7 crore
- Box office: est.₹50 crore

Natasamrat (transl. The King of Theater or The Emperor of Actors) is a 2016 Indian Marathi-language drama film starring Nana Patekar in the leading role. Based on a play of the same name written by playwright Kusumagraj, the film depicts the tragic family life of a stage actor who has retired from acting but is unable to forget his fond memories of theatre and the stage.

It is directed by Mahesh Manjrekar and produced by Nana Patekar and Vishwas Joshi under the banner of Great Maratha Entertainment, Gajanan Chitra and Fincraft Media and Entertainment Pvt. Ltd. The film was officially released in India on 1 January 2016 and became the highest-grossing Marathi film at the time, until Sairat occupied that place. The film was remade in Gujarati in 2018 as Natsamrat, and in Telugu in 2023 as Rangamarthanda.

== Plot ==
Ganpat Ramchandra Belwalkar aka Appa, an acclaimed veteran theatre actor, has earned immense fortune, fame, and the prestigious title of Natsamrat (transl. The Emperor of Actors). Following his retirement, he bequeaths his entire wealth and property to his children, keeping nothing for himself. Appa's outspoken nature and frequent use of expletives to express himself alienate his son, Makrand, and daughter-in-law, Neha. After Makrand's daughter performs a folk dance taught by Appa at a school function, Neha expresses her embarrassment and resentment towards Appa, demanding household separation. Recognizing her intent, Appa voluntarily moves out with his wife, Kaveri.

The couple relocates to the home of their daughter, Vidya, and her supportive engineer husband, Rahul. While Rahul tolerates Appa's erratic behaviour and appreciates his recitals, his alcoholism and unfiltered nature irk Vidya. Meanwhile, Appa visits his close friend Rambhau, who is hospitalised and devastated following the death of his wife, Kumud. Rambhau lashes out at Appa for abandoning him in his final days. While lying on his hospital bed, Rambhau enacts a heart-touching conversation between Karna and Krishna, with Appa performing alongside him, and urges Appa to end his pain. Upon returning home, Kaveri informs Appa about Rambhau's death, and he quietly admits to supplying the sleeping pills to assist in his friend's mercy killing.

After Appa insults the son of Rahul's boss over a weak theatrical adaption of Othello, an embarrassed Vidya moves her parents to an outhouse on the property. Later, she misplaces a sum of money and falsely accuses her parents of theft. Though she finds the misplaced cash and apologizes, a deeply hurt Appa and Kaveri leave during the night for their ancestral village. En route, they take shelter in a small village, where Kaveri succumbs to a severe fever.

Devastated by Kaveri's demise, Appa drifts into poverty and mental decline. He befriends Raja, a homeless shoe shiner living under a bridge. To survive, Appa takes a job serving tea at a local tea stall, where he occasionally entertains the customers with dramatic monologues. A young theatre enthusiast named Siddharth recognizes Appa and relentlessly follows him, though Appa denies his identity.

Upon reading that his favourite theatre has been destroyed in a fire, Appa rushes to the site, shattered to find it reduced to ashes. Siddharth, along with Appa's estranged family and Raja, arrives at the ruins to find him. Appa finally acknowledges his true identity to Siddharth and refuses his family's pleas to return home. Delusional, he steps on the burnt stage, delivers a passionate monologue about the burden of existence and the essence of acting before suddenly collapsing and dying on the stage.

== Cast ==
- Nana Patekar as Ganpat Ramchandra Belwalkar/ Natsamrat/ Appa /Baba
- Medha Manjrekar as Kaveri Ganpat Belwalkar/Sarkar
- Vikram Gokhale as Rambhau
- Mrunmayee Deshpande as Vidya Ganpat Belwalkar/Vidya Rahul Barve, Ganpat's daughter
- Ajit Parab as Makrand Ganpat Belwalkar, Ganpat's son
- Neha Pendse as Neha Makrand Belwalkar
- Sunil Barve as Rahul Barve / Vidya's husband
- Sarang Sathaye as Siddharth
- Pranjal Parab
- Sarita Malpekar
- Vidya Patwardhan
- Jaywant Wadkar
- Nilesh Divekar
- Sandeep Pathak
- Jitendra Joshi guest appearance
- Aniket Vishwasrao guest appearance
- Pooja Sawant guest appearance
- Neha Mahajan guest appearance

== Synopsis ==
The film is the screen adaptation of noted Marathi playwright Kusumagraj’s iconic Marathi play "Natsamrat" which was first staged in 1970. Dr. Shriram Lagoo has acted in the Marathi play in the role of Natsamrat for a very long time.

== Soundtrack ==
Music for this film is composed by Ajit Parab. Lyrics are by V.V. Shirwadkar a.k.a. Kusumagraj and Guru Thakur.

No.	Title	Singer(s)	Length
1.	"Mituni Lochane"	Vijay Prakash	04:07
2.	"Natyaasa Naav Apulya"	Vibhavari Apte Joshi	04:32
Total length:			08:39

== Release ==
The film was released on 1 January 2016, which is also the birthday of Nana Patekar. Apart from Maharashtra, Natsamrat released in Gujarat, Goa, Madhya Pradesh, Karnataka, Delhi, Telangana and West Bengal with nearly 1,600 shows across more than 400 screens in the country daily. It also had special screenings in countries like UK, Singapore, Canada, USA till March 2016. Even in its 6th week it was running successfully in 174 theaters with 2,225 daily shows all over Maharashtra.

== Reception ==
The film received praise for its portrayal of the angst of an aged veteran theater actor. Film critics praised the movie for acting skills, direction, cinematography and script. The film received overwhelming response at the box office, and ran for more than 50 days across Maharashtra.

== Box office ==
Natsamrat collected ₹10.25 Crore in first weekend and ₹16.50 Crore in 1st week. It collected ₹22 Crore in 10 days, ₹36 Crore till the 4th week and became the highest-grossing film in Marathi, by collecting ₹40 Crore in 15 weeks. The film grossed over ₹39 Crore in India and ₹48 Crore worldwide.

== Accolades ==
Best Marathi Film Award

- Best Marathi Film-

Filmfare Marathi Awards

- Nana Patekar – Best Actor – Won
- Medha Manjrekar – Best Actress – Nominated.
- Vikram Gokhale – Best Supporting Actor - Won
- Mahesh Manjrekar - Critics Best Film - Won

Zee Gaurav Puraskar

- Best Director – Mahesh Manjrekar
- Best Actor – Nana Patekar

== See also ==
- Highest grossing Marathi films
- Natsamrat, 2018 Gujarati film
- Ranga Maarthaanda, Telugu film
