= Indian Journal of Medical Ethics =

- Discipline: Medical ethics
- Language: English
- Edited by: Amar Jesani

Publication details
- Former name: Medical Ethics
- History: 1993–present
- Publisher: Forum for Medical Ethics Society (India)
- Frequency: Quarterly
- Open access: Yes
- License: CC BY-NC-ND 4.0

Standard abbreviations
- ISO 4: Indian J. Med. Ethics

Indexing
- ISSN: 0974-8466 (print); 0975-5691 (web)
- LCCN: 2003323692
- OCLC no.: 920393894

Links
- Journal homepage; Online archive

The Indian Journal of Medical Ethics is a quarterly peer-reviewed academic journal covering medical ethics and bioethics. It was established in 1993 by the Forum for Medical Ethics Society, an activist group campaigning to reform the Maharashtra Medical Council. The journal was originally entitled Medical Ethics, and its first issue was published in August 1993. It obtained its current title in January 2004. The editor-in-chief is Amar Jesani. The online version of the journal is open-access, the printed version is subscription-based; there are no article processing charges.

== Fraudulent paper ==
In May 2018, the journal attracted criticism when it was revealed that it had published a paper attributed to "Lars Andersson", whose affiliation was listed as the Karolinska Institute. In fact, the real name of the author of the paper was not Lars Andersson, and he did not have any affiliation with the Karolinska. The journal initially responded by issuing a statement describing the author's deception as "unacceptable", but refusing to retract the paper. Instead, editor-in-chief Amar Jesani removed the author's name and affiliation from the paper on the journal's website. Later that month, the journal retracted the paper, writing in a statement that "...we have concluded that tolerating the author's deception and retaining the article was an error of judgment.

== Abstracting and indexing ==
The journal is abstracted and indexed in:

- Embase
- Index Medicus/MEDLINE/PubMed
- Scopus
