= Homi Minocher Dastur =

Homi Minocher Dastur (16 August 1926 - 2022) was an Indian professor of neurosurgery at King Edward Memorial Hospital (KEM), Mumbai.
