= Pune-Okayama Friendship Garden =

Public park in Pune, India

Pu La Deshpande Garden, Pune
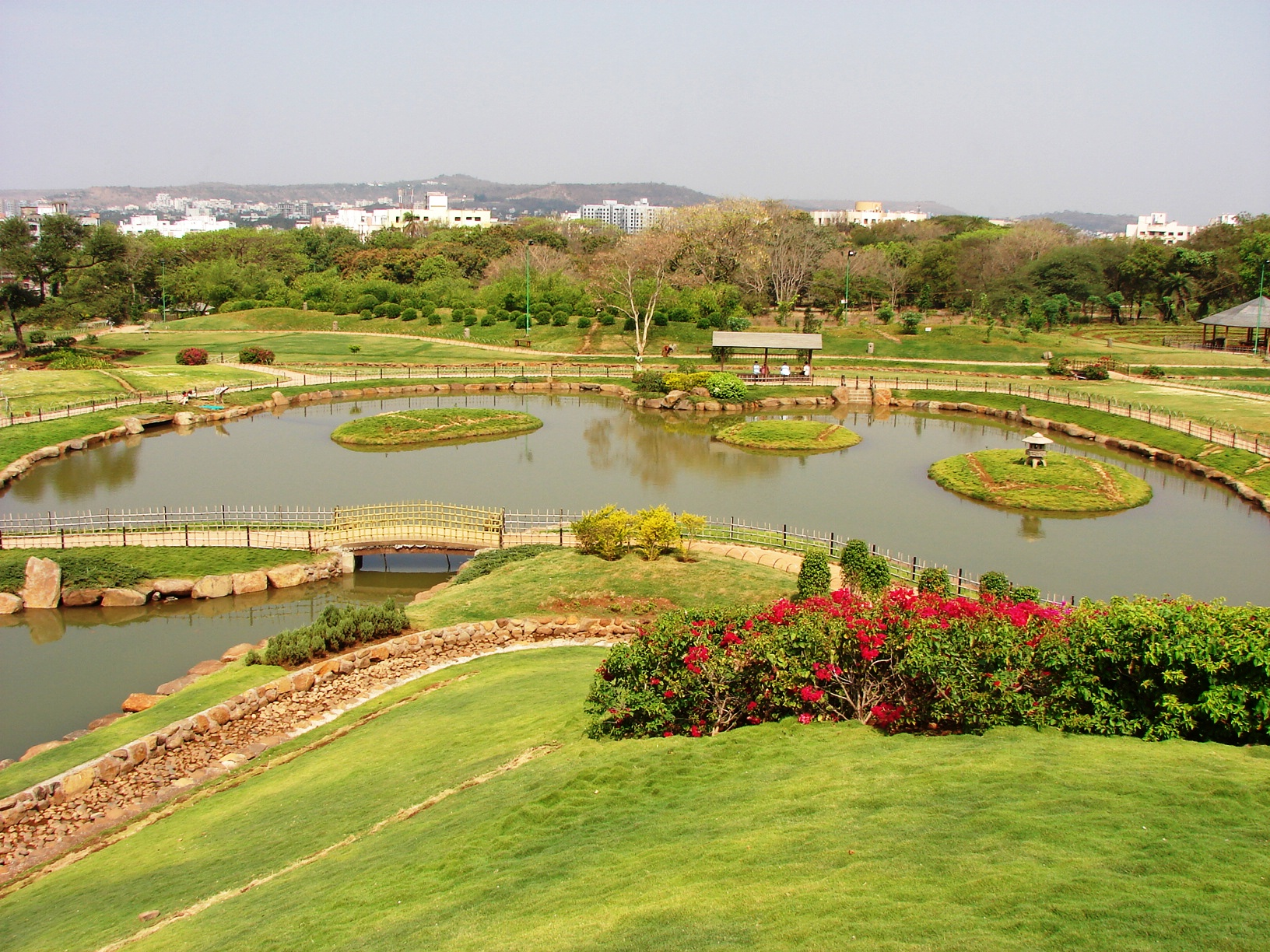
- Interactive map of Pu La Deshpande Garden, Pune
- Type: Public park
- Location: Pune, Maharashtra, India

Pune-Okayama Friendship Garden or Pu La Deshpande Udyan is one of the largest gardens in Pune located on Tanaji Malusare road (Sinhgad road) in Pune, Maharashtra, India.

== Details ==
The garden was inspired by the 300-year-old Kōraku-en Garden in Okayama, so it is also called the Pune-Okayama Friendship Garden. The garden has naturally flowing water from a canal, and this flow has been spread across the garden. The garden is well maintained, and walking on the lawn is not allowed. The garden is built across 10 acres. The style is devised in such a way that people can take a walk through a garden enjoying the landscape, which changes along the garden paths. Visitors can see colourful fish from on top of a small bridge in the center of garden. This Japanese garden has been named after Pu La Deshpande, a well known Marathi writer from Maharashtra, India.

=== Pune-Okayama Friendship Garden - Phase II ===
The phase 2 of this garden is known as Mughal Garden and is a replica of the Mughal garden in Rashtrapati Bhavan, New Delhi. BJP corporator took up project to install Surya Namaskar statues and those have been opened to public on 19 June 2017 by Mukta Tilak.

== Events ==
Well known film shootings have taken place at this garden such as the shoot for popular Bollywood actor Salman Khan's song "I Love you" from the movie "Bodyguard"

== Transport ==
The garden is located at Sinhagad road and can be reached by bus, taxi or auto rickshaw. This garden is a busy place during the weekends and school holidays.
