= A. B. Shah =

A. B. Shah (1920–1981) was the founder-president of the Indian Secular Society. The organization had its headquarters in Pune in Shah's lifetime but has now shifted to Mumbai. Until his death, A. B. Shah was the editor of The Secularist, a journal published by the Indian Secular Society (ISS). He also the edited the New Quest published by the Indian Association for Cultural Freedom. Shah took much interest in the problems of Indian Muslims. Shah's writings include What Ails our Muslims? and Religion and Society in India. Shah also edited Jayaprakash Narayan's Prison Diary, written by the prominent Indian leader in jail during the Emergency of 1975. Professor Shah was a mathematician and a scholar, who became interested in comparative religion and social reform, leading to founding Indian Secular Society.

== Biography ==
A. B. Shah was born in 1920 in a Digambar Jain family in Gujarat. As a result, he was an atheist even in his childhood. However, till the age of seventeen he was to some extent a practising Jain. Ernst Haeckel's The Riddle of the Universe and Hyman Levy's The Universe of Science convinced Shah that not only God but even soul did not exist. Jainism believes in the existence of soul. Shah was also influenced by M. N. Roy. Hamid Dalwai, the author of Muslim Politics in India was a friend of A. B. Shah. Shah started taking interest in Islam only after meeting Dalwai. Dalwai co-operated with Shah in founding Indian Secular Society and Muslim Satyashodhak Mandal. In 1973 Shah was one of the signers of the Humanist Manifesto. He was the Director of the Institute for the Study on Indian Traditions in Pune, Maharashtra at the time of his death in 1981.

== Indian Secular Society ==
The Indian Secular Society is a non-political organisation, which works for promoting secular human values in Indian Society. Shah has paid much attention to Islam and to the problems of Indian Muslims in his works. Hamid Dalwai played an important role in the formation of the organization. The foundation-conference of ISS was presided by Prof. G.D. Parikh, who was an associate of M. N. Roy, a prominent Indian humanist of Twentieth Century. As elaborated by A.B. Shah himself, the Indian Secular Society works mainly at the level of ideas and communication. It has tried to document and discuss secularist and obscurantist trends in Indian society. Shah was also opposed to Hindu communalism. The ISS stands for the spirit of the Indian Constitution and the United Nations Charter of Human Rights. The organisation has published several books and booklets in English including those written by Shah himself.

== Muslim Satyashodhak Mandal ==
In 1970, Hamid Dalwai and A.B. Shah, founded Muslim Satyashodhak Mandal in co-operation with the Indian Secular Society. This organisation provided a forum for secular Muslims for reforming and modernising Muslims in India. Dalwai was opposed to the notion that religion could help in encouraging modernisation and secularism. He considered "religious reformation" as an anachronistic concept. He wanted religion to be confined to its "proper sphere", that is, the personal relationship between the individual and his God. According to Dalwai, trying to justify social reform in the name of religion was counterproductive and would only strengthen those who were in a position to claim traditional authority to interpret the scriptures. Hence, Dalwai was in favour of making a clear distinction between religious revivalism camouflaged as a reform movement, and a renaissance based on reason and knowledge. Both Shah and Dalwai faced threats from conservative Hindus and Muslims for the reform-work they were doing.

== Some publications of the Indian Secular Society ==
A. B. Shah, Religion and Society in India

A. B. Shah, What Ails Our Muslims?

Narsingh Narain, A Commonsense Humanism and other Essays

V. K. Sinha (ed.), The Reason Case

Jawaharlal Nehru, What is Religion?

Bertrand Russell, Why I am not a Christian

A. Solomon, Rationalism and the Humanist Outlook

Paul Kurtz (ed.), A Secular Humanist Declaration

Finngeir Hiorth, Introduction to Humanism

Finngeir Hiorth, Atheism in India

Finngeir Hiorth, Introduction to Atheism

Finngeir Hiorth, Ethics for Atheists

== Books by A. B. Shah ==
Scientific Method (Bombay: Allied Publishers Pvt. Ltd.,1964)

Religion and Society in India (Pune: Indian Secular Society, 1981)

What Ails our Muslims? (Pune: Indian Secular Society, 1981)

Challenges to Secularism Planning for Democracy and Other Essays
