= Bombay Steam Navigation Company =

Indian shipping company

The House flag of Bombay Steam Navigation Co. Ltd.

Bombay Steam Navigation Company was the first Indian-owned shipping company. It was founded by Ismail Hasham, a Kutchi Memon.

The company operated passenger ferry and cargo services along the Konkan coast of India. In 1952, it was amalgamated with The Scindia Steam Navigation Company Limited.

== Ships ==
At various times, Bombay Steam Navigation Company owned and operated the following ships-

- SS Mandovi (An 1886 built 218 Gross registered tons cargo ship, she was lost in the English channel in the same year as her built)
- SS Bhima (A Cargo steamship of 1,194 GRT, Built by Earles Ship building UK in 1864. The Bhima was lost in 1866 on a voyage from Bombay to Suez)
- SS Brahmani (Built by Aisa shipbuilding Scotland in 1891, the Brahmani was a steam cargo ship of 1015 GRT. In 1900, she sank following a collision near Karwar, en route from Mangalore to Bombay)
- SS Godavari (A 182 GRT 1884 built cargo ship, the Godavari ran aground in 1910)
- SS Mozaffari (The Mozaffari was among the first Indian registered ships of Bombay steam navigation. Built in 1882 by Schlesinger Davis & Co. - Wallsend, the Mozaffari was acquired by the company in 1896. She ran aground and was wrecked in 1910 when entering Mozambique on a voyage from ports in East Africa to Bombay)
- MV Dipavati (A diesel propelled passenger ship of 840 GRT, built in 1936 in Scotland, she capsized while at anchor off Bombay in 1948)

== List of proprietors ==
In chronological order:

- Ismail Hasham (founder)
- Ismail Yusuf (son of Ismail Hasham)
- (Sir) Mohamed Yusuf (son of Ismail Yusuf)
- Abdul Rahaman Yusuf (eldest son of Mohamed Yusuf)
