= Ismail Yusuf College =

College of Mumbai, India

- Ismail Yusuf College
- Motto: "Sā vidyā yā vimuktaye"
- Type: Govt. College
- Established: 1930; 96 years ago
- Affiliations: UGC, NAAC, University of Mumbai
- Principal: Swati Wavhal
- Undergraduates: BSc, B.Com, BA
- Location: Mumbai, Maharashtra, India; 19.13334°N 72.854022°E
- Campus: Urban, Jogeshwari, 54 acres (220,000 m^{2})
- Nickname: IY College
- Website: ismailyusufcollege.ac.in

Ismail Yusuf College is the fourth oldest college of Mumbai, India. "I Y college", as it is popularly known, is managed by the Government of Maharashtra. It is the oldest college in North Mumbai. It was established in 1930 with a large donation from Sir Mohammed Yusuf Ismail, K.T. on Jogeshwari Hill. The foundation stone was laid by Leslie Orme Wilson, Governor of Bombay in 1924.

In April 2025, The Times of India reported that Ismail Yusuf College did not yet have a college development committee (CDC) and could get fined.

== Alumni ==
- Kantilal Mardia, Mathematician and statistician
- A. R. Antulay, former Chief Minister of Maharashtra State
- Rafiq Zakaria, Islamic scholar and former Minister of Maharashtra State
- P. L. Deshpande, Marathi playwright
- Kader Khan, film artist
- Habib Wali Mohammad, ghazal singer
- Amroz Siddiqui, Maths scholar, teacher
- Hamid Dalwai, social reformer
- Shankar Vaidya, Marathi poet and former Marathi Professor of I Y College
- Sunil K. Pandya, Neurosurgeon, historian, author
