= Ismail Hasham =

Indian businessman

Ismail Hasham (also known as Haji Ismail Hasham) was a late 19th-century Indian businessman and the founder of Bombay Steam Navigation Company, the first Indian owned shipping company. The Yusuf family owned large parts of land in Mumbai. Hasham had one son, Ismail Yusuf.
