= Purushottam Laxman Deshpande =

Indian writer and humorist (1919–2000)

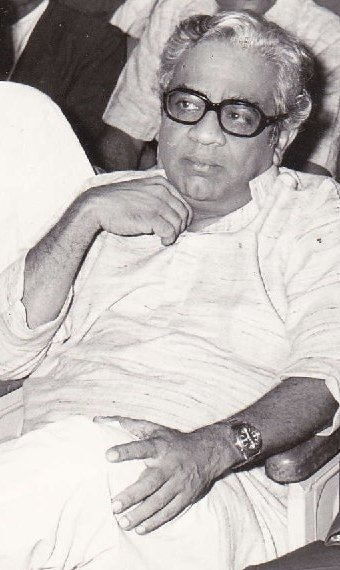
- Deshpande, c. 1974
- Born: 8 November 1919; Bombay, Bombay Presidency, British India
- Died: 12 June 2000 (aged 80); Pune, Maharashtra, India
- Other names: Pu. La. Deshpande; Bhai
- Occupation: Writer
- Spouse: Sunita Deshpande (m. 1946)
- Relatives: Vaman Mangesh Dubhashi (maternal grandfather); Satish Dubhashi (cousin brother); Dinesh Thakur (nephew)
- Website: puladeshpande.net

Signature
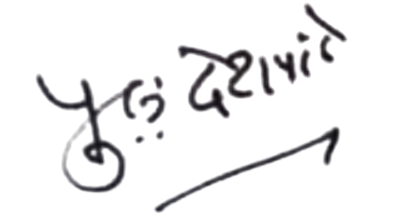

Purushottam Laxman Deshpande (alternatively written as Pu La Deshpande; 8 November 1919 – 12 June 2000) was a Marathi writer and humorist from Maharashtra. He was also an accomplished film and stage actor, script writer, author, composer, musician, singer and orator. He was often referred to as "महाराष्ट्राचे लाडके व्यक्तिमत्व", "Maharashtra's beloved personality".

Deshpande's works have been translated into several languages including English and Kannada.

== Early life ==
Purushottam Laxman Deshpande was born in Gamdevi Street, Chowpati, Mumbai in a Gaud Saraswat Brahmin (GSB) family to Laxman Trimbak Deshpande and Laxmibai Laxman Deshpande. His maternal grandfather, Vaman Mangesh Dubhashi, was a Marathi poet and writer. He had translated Rabindranath Tagore's Gitanjali into Marathi, with the title, "Abhang Gitanjali".

The family used to stay at Kenway House, Procter Road in the Grant Road locality in Mumbai. His family then moved to Jogeshwari. His first 8 years at the newly formed Saraswati Baug Colony are described in the story titled 'Balpanicha Kaal Sukhacha' or Bālpaṇicā Kāḷ Sukhācā (translation: the happy days of childhood) in his book Purchundi. The family then moved to Vile Parle.

== Education ==
Deshpande studied at Parle Tilak Vidyalaya. He attended Ismail Yusuf College after high school and then Fergusson College in Pune for BA. Later, he attended Government Law College, Mumbai for LLB. He completed Bachelor of Arts (BA) degree in 1950 and then a Master of Arts (MA) degree from Willingdon College, Sangli. He also took lessons in playing the harmonium from Dattopant Rajopadhye of Bhaskar Sangitalaya.

== Personal life ==
His first wife, Sundar Divadkar, died soon after their wedding. On 12 June 1946, Deshpande married his colleague, Sunita Thakur. She (Sunita Deshpande) was to go on to become an accomplished writer in her own right. The couple did not have any children of their own. They raised Sunitabai's nephew, Dinesh Thakur as their own son. Pu La wrote on Dinesh in his book Gangot.

== Professional life ==
=== Educator ===
Both Deshpande and his wife served as teachers in Orient High School, Mumbai. He also worked for some years as a college professor in Rani Parvati Devi College, Belgaum in Karnataka and Kirti College in Mumbai.

=== Television ===
He also worked for Doordarshan, the state-owned TV channel. He was the first person to interview the then Prime Minister, Jawaharlal Nehru, on Indian television. He was seconded to the BBC for a year-long training. After this, he spent some time in France and West Germany. It was this specific period and stays in these countries that his later travelogue "Apoorvai" was to be based upon. His other travelogues are "Poorvaranga" and "Jave Tyanchya Desha".

=== Film and music ===
Deshpande was a man of many talents. Apart from writing, the talents he used in filmmaking included writing screenplays, directing, acting, composing music, and singing. He was instrumental in establishing the iconic Bal Gandharva Ranga Mandir in Pune. He was a proficient in Hindustani classical music.He composed music for many marathi films of 1940s and '50s including 'Amaldar', 'Gulacha Ganapati', 'Ghardhani', 'Chokhamela', 'Dudhbhat', 'Dev Pavla', 'Devbappa', 'Navrabayako', 'Nave Birhad', 'Manache Paan' and 'Mothi Manase'. He was also the composer for many popular non-film songs in the "bhavegeet" genre sung by singers such as Jyotsna Bhole, Manik Varma and Asha Bhosale.

== Death ==
Deshpande died in Pune, Maharashtra, on 12 June 2000, due to complications from Parkinson's disease. He was aged 80. He died on the couple's 54th wedding anniversary.

== Bibliography ==
Most of Deshpande's literary contributions are in the Marathi language. Although he wrote across several genres, he was particularly well known for his works of humor. He also adapted prominent works from other languages into screenplays - scripts - for films in the Marathi. Prominent examples include:

- The 1952 film अंमलदार (Ammaldar), based on Nikolai Gogol's Inspector General,
- The 1962 book काय वाट्टेल ते होईल (Kay Wattel Te Hoeel), based on the translation of Helen and George Papashvily's script of Anything Can Happen.
- Teen paishyacha tamasha based on The Threepenny Opera (Die Dreigroschenoper) by Bertolt Brecht

The Marathi book eka koliyane ( एका कोळीयानें ) is a translation ( भावानुवाद ) of Ernest Hemingway's book old man and the sea.

He referred to his adaptations as भावानुवाद (Bhawanuwad or paraphrasing) instead of as conventional "translation"s or "adaptation"s.

== Filmography ==
- कुबेर (Kuber) – 1947: actor and playback singer
- भाग्यरेखा (Bhagyarekha) – 1948: actor and playback singer
- वंदेमातरम् (Wandemataram) – 1948: actor and playback singer
- जागा भाड्याने देणे आहे (Jaga Bhadyane Dene ahe) – 1949: screenplay and dialogues
- मानाचे पान (Manache Pan) – 1949: – story, screenplay, and dialogues; co-music director in collaboration with Ga Di Madgulkar
- मोठी माणसे (Mothi Manase) – 1949: music director
- गोकुळचा राजा (Gokulacha Raja) – 1950: Writer of Story, Screenplay, and Dialogues
- जरा जपून (Jara Japoon) – 1950: Writer of Screenplay and Dialogues
- जोहार मायबाप (Johar Maybap) – 1950: Actor
- नवरा बायको (Nawara Bayako) – 1950: Music Director and Writer of Story, Screenplay, and Dialogues
- ही वाट पंढरीची (Hi Wat Pandharichi) – 1950: Actor
- पुढचे पाऊल (Pudhache Paool) – 1950: Actor and Writer of Screenplay and Dialogues in collaboration with Ga Di Madgulkar
- वर पाहिजे (Var Pahije) – 1950: Actor and Writer of Screenplay and Dialogues in collaboration with Achyut Ranade
- देव पावला (Dewa Pawala) – 1950: Music Director
- दूध भात (Doodh Bhat) – 1952: Music Director and Writer of Story, Screenplay, Dialogues, and Lyrics
- घरधनी (Ghardhani) – 1952: Music Director and Writer of Screenplay, Dialogues, and Lyrics
- नवे बिर्हाड (Nawe Birhad) – 1952: Writer of Story and Screenplay
- माईसाहेब (Maisaheb) – 1952: Music Director and Writer of Screenplay and Dialogues
- संदेश (Sandesh) [in Hindi] – 1952: Writer of Story, Screenplay, and Dialogues (translated by Mir Asgar Ali)
- देवबाप्पा (Dewabappa) – 1952: Music Director and Writer of Story, Screenplay, Dialogues, and Lyrics
- गुळाचा गणपती (Gulacha Ganapati) – 1953: Director, music director, actor, and Writer of Story, Screenplay, Dialogues, and Lyrics
- फूल और कलियाँ (Phool Aur Kaliyan) [in Hindi] – 1960: Story writer –
- सुंदर मी होणार (This novel was adopted to make Hindi movie Aaj aur Kal) [in Hindi] – 1966: Story writer –
- चिमणराव गुंड्याभाऊ (Chimanarao Gundyabhau) – : Narrator
- एक होता विदूषक (Ek Hota Vidushak) – 1993: Screenplay and Dialogues

== Awards and recognition ==
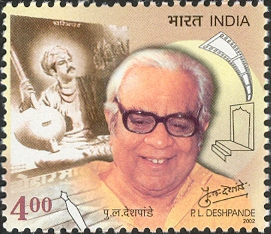
Deshpande on a 2002 stamp of India

- Punyabhushan – 1993
- Padma Bhushan – 1990
- Maharashtra Gaurav (Bahurupi) Award
- Padma Shri – 1966
- Sahitya Akademi Award (Marathi for Vyakti Ani Valli) – 1965
- Sangeet Natak Akademi Award – 1967
- Sangeet Natak Akademi Fellowship – 1979
- Maharashtra Bhushan Award – 1996
- Kalidas Samman – 1987
- Honorary Doctor of Literature Degrees from Rabindra Bharati University (1979), University of Pune (1980) and Tilak Maharashtra University (1993)
- First interviewer to interview Pandit Jawaharlal Nehru, the first Prime Minister of India, for the then newly founded Doordarshan
- The "P. L. Deshpande Maharashtra Kala Academy" was established by the Government of Maharashtra in Mumbai to honour his contributions to Marathi literature – 2002
- A garden, Pu. La. Deshpande Udyan (also known as "Pune-Okayama Friendship Garden"), in Pune was named after him in commemoration
- On 8 November 2020 (his 101st birth anniversary), Google honoured him with a Google Doodle
- A computer font titled PuLa 100, which mimicked his handwriting, was made available in 2020

== Social work ==
Pu La Deshpande donated and participated in several social and philanthropic causes.

- Seed donation to Muktangan Deaddiction and Rehabilitation Center
- Donation to IUCAA Muktangan Vidnyan Shodhika
- Donation to Neehar, a hostel for the children of sex workers
- Donation for closed-door auditorium and an open theatre for the blind students at Baba Amte's Anandvan
- Supporter of Andhashraddha Nirmoolan Samiti (Committee for Eradication of blind Superstitions), promoting cultivation of scientific temperament

Pu. La. Deshpande's wife, Sunita Deshpande, donated Rs.25 lakhs to IUCAA towards Muktangan Vidnyan Shodhika, a building aptly named as "PULASTYA" (a name of a star and memory of PULA.) After the demise of Sunita deshpande, the copyrights of most of Pu. La's books were given to IUCAA and the royalties received from Pu La's works is used to spread Science awareness among young kids by IUCAA.

== In popular culture ==
=== Films and television ===
- Gola Berij, a 2012 Indian Marathi-language film directed by Kshitij Zarapkar, presents a fictionaized account of his life.
- Bhai: Vyakti Ki Valli is the film released on 4 January 2019 on P L Deshpande directed by Mahesh Manjrekar. The film was criticized by many for taking cinematic liberty. A sequel Bhai - Vyakti Ki Valli 2 was released a month later.
- Namune, a television serial on Sony SAB based on Deshpande's literature, has the actor Sanjay Mone play the role of Deshpande. Along with Sanjay Mone, there are various actors from the Hindi and Marathi film industry.

=== Documentaries ===
Documentary on Pu. La. Deshpande: This is a Govt. of India Films Division documentary, in which Pu La himself reveals his life journey. It was filmed on the occasion of his 60th birthday. There are two other documentaries made on Pu La:

- One by Mukta Rajadhyakshya and Sudhir Moghe called Ya Sama Haa on his 75th birthday and
- Pu La Vruttant, made by Jabbar Patel, in which Pu La himself talks about his life.

== See also ==
- List of Indian writers
- Pralhad Keshav Atre

Preceded by Gajanan Digambar Madgulkar	Marathi Sahitya Sammelan – President; 1974 Ichalkaranji	Succeeded by Durga Bhagwat
