= Arun Sadhu =

Indian writer and journalist

- Born: June 17, 1941; Paratwada, Amravati, India
- Died: September 25, 2017 (aged 76)
- Occupations: Writer, journalist

Arun Sadhu (17 June 1941 – 25 September 2017) was a writer and a freelance journalist from Maharashtra, India. He has written in Marathi, Hindi, and English. He is better known for his novel "Simhasan" and "Mumbai Dinank".

== Early life ==
He was born and brought up in Achalpur (twin town of Paratwada) in Amravati District of Vidarbha region in Maharashtra.

== Career ==
In his earlier career, Sadhu worked in different capacities on the staff of a few national English newspapers and then served for six years as a professor and the head of the Department of Communication and Journalism at Pune University. As a political reporter, he started his journalistic career at Marathi daily ‘Kesari’ in Pune in the 1960s. In his three-decade- long journalistic career, he worked for the Statesman, The Times of India, The Indian Express and the Free Press Journal in Mumbai and was a stronger for Time magazine.

Sadhu has won several awards for his literary work. He presided over Marathi Sahitya Sammelan at Nagpur in 2007. He depicted through his writings on China, Russia to a story on a small boot polish boy in city. His writings give insight on international, national affairs.

He has also worked as a script writer in some films. He was a co-script writer of the movie Dr. Babasaheb Ambedkar (2000) along with Sooni Taraporevala and Daya Pawar.

=== 2008 Sammelan ===
Sadhu, the outgoing president of 2008 Marathi Sahitya Sammelan held in Sangli left its inaugural function, protesting that Marathi writers who were sitting on the Sammelan platform along with some politicians were being "overshadowed" by the politicians by way of curtailment of time slots in the inaugural schedule for the writers on the platform through presidential protocol.

== Authorship ==
Sadhu has written several novels, collections of his short stories, and a few books on contemporary history as well as written editorials opposing violence. The following is a partial list of his books.

- Maharashtra
- Kakasaheb Gadgil (In English and Hindi)
- Fidel, Che Ani Kranti
- Dragon Jaga Jhalyawar
- Mukhawata
- Simhasan
- Mumbai Dinank (1973) (and also its Hindi version Bambai Dinank)
- Padgam (a play) (1988)
- Shodhyatra
- Sphot
- Shapit
- Bahishkrut
- Trishanku
- Glanirbhavati Bharat (short stories)
- Tisari Kranti
- The pioneer in English and sahakaradhurin in Marathi - a biopic of Padmashree Vitthalrao Vikhepatil who pioneered the movement of cooperative sugar mills and started it in 1950.
- Mantrajagar collection of shortstories
- Ziparya
- Prarambh bus stop ani itar 3 ekankika collection of one act plays
- Visaralelya aathvaninchi Katha collection of short stories

Along with Sooni Taraporevala and Daya Pawar, Sadhu was a co-script writer of the movie Dr. Babasaheb Ambedkar (2000).

== Awards ==
1. Sahitya Akademi Award
2. Bharatiya Bhasha Parishad award
3. N C Kelkaraward
4. Acharya Atre awards
5. Janasthan awards
6. Rachna award

== Death ==
Arun Sadhu died on Monday at 4 am in Mumbai on 25 September 2017. He was admitted to Sion Hospital, where he was suffering from cardiomyopathy. On his death, Maharashtra Chief Minister Devendra Fadnavis said, “Arun Sadhu’s novel Sinhasan and Mumbai Dinank are landmark in Marathi literature. He wrote on contemporary issues, problems of metropolitan life very effectively. He guided generations of journalists. His demise is sad. I offer my deep condolences and share the sorrow of his family and friends,”
