= Mirjoli =

Village in Maharashtra, India

- a Village
- Location in Maharashtra, India
- Coordinates: 17.53°N 73.52°E
- Country: India
- State: Maharashtra
- District: Ratnagiri
- Established: 4000 BC

Government
  - Type: Gram Panchayat

Languages
- Time zone: UTC+5:30 (IST)
- PIN: 415605
- Telephone code: 02355
- Vehicle registration: MH-08

Mirjoli is a small village on the banks of the Vashishti River in the mandal of Chiplun, Ratnagiri district, Maharashtra.
