= Sunita Deshpande =

Indian writer (1926–2009)

- Born: Sunita Thakur; 3 July 1926
- Died: 7 November 2009 (aged 83); Pune, Maharashtra, India
- Occupation: Writer
- Spouse: Purushottam Laxman Deshpande (m. 1946)

Sunita Deshpande (née Thakur; 3 July 1926 – 7 November 2009) was an Indian writer. She was fondly called "Sunitabai".

== Career ==
Deshpande began writing late in her life. She published her memoir Aahe Manohar Tari (आहे मनोहर तरी) in 1990. The book has been translated into Gujarati ("Manohar chhe pan" by Suresh Dalal, SNDT, Mumbai 1992), Hindi ("Hai Sabse madhur phir bhi" by Rekha Deshpande, Orient Longman 1996), Kannada ("Balu Sogasadaru", by Uma Kulkarni, Mahila Sahitya, Hubli) and English ("..And Pine For What Is Not", by Gauri Deshpande, Orient Longman, 1995).

She was also a prolific correspondent. Her book "प्रिय जी.ए." (translation: Dear G.A.), a collection of correspondence with Marathi writer G. A. Kulkarni, won her the first "G A Kulkarni Award" for remarkable literary contributions and influence in 2008.

She acted in Marathi movie, "Vande Maataram" based on India's freedom struggle in which she had participated herself, and plays such as "Sunder mee honaar", "Raajemaster", and "Rajamaataa Jijaabai" (a solo show)

== Personal life ==
In 1945, she met Pu La Deshpande and they were married the next year on 12 June 1946. She was a native of Ratnagiri district.

== Death ==
She died in Pune on 7 November 2009 due to age. She was 83 years old. Her death occurred a day before her husband's 90th birth anniversary.

== Selected works ==
- आहे मनोहर तरी... (Ahe Manohar Tari...) (Mauj Pub., Mumbai 1990)
- प्रिय जी.ए. (Priya G. A. : Collection of letters written in Marathi to writer G. A. Kulkarni)(Mauj Pub., Mumbai 2003)
- मण्यांची माळ (Mauj Pub., Mumbai 2002)
- मनातलं अवकाश (Mauj Pub., Mumbai 2006)
- सोयरे सकळ (Mauj Pub., Mumbai 1998)
- समांतर जीवन ("Sammantar Jeevan") (Sun Pub., 1992)
