= Kusumagraj =

Indian writer and poet (1912–1999)

Kusumāgraj Vishnu Vaman Shirwadkar
- Portrait of Kusumāgraj
- Born: 27 February 1912; Poona, Bombay Presidency, British India (present day Pune, Maharashtra, India)
- Died: 10 March 1999 (aged 87); Shirwade Wani, Nashik, Maharashtra, India
- Occupations: Poet, playwright, novelist, short story writer, humanist
- Notable work: Vishakha; Natsamrat
- Awards: Padma Bhushan (1991); Jnanpith Award (1987); Sahitya Akademi Award (1974)
- Website: kusumagraj.org

Vishnū Vāman Shirwādkar (27 February 1912 – 10 March 1999), popularly known by his pen name, Kusumāgraj, was a Marathi poet, playwright, novelist and short story writer, who wrote of freedom, justice and emancipation of the deprived.

In a career spanning five decades starting in India's pre-independence era, he wrote 16 volumes of poems, three novels, eight volumes of short stories, seven volumes of essays, 18 plays and six one-act plays. His works like the Vishākhā (1942), a collection of lyrics, inspired a generation into the Indian freedom movement, and is today considered one of the masterpieces of Indian literature.

He was the recipient of the 1974 Sahitya Akademi Award in Marathi for Natsamrat, Padma Bhushan (1991) and the Jnanapith Award in 1987.

He also served as the President of the Akhil Bharatiya Marathi Sahitya Sammelan held at Margao(Madgaon) in 1964.

== Early life and education ==
Kusumagraj was born into a Deshastha Brahmin family on 27 February 1912 in Pune as Gajanan Ranganath Shirwadkar. He even published some of his poetry under this name in 1930s. Upon being adopted somewhat late in life in 1930s, his name was changed to Vishnu Waman Shirwadkar. He later adopted the sobriquet 'Kusumagraj'. He pursued his primary education in Pimpalgaon and high school education in the New English School of Nashik, which is now called J.S. Rungtha High School of Nashik. He passed matriculation from Mumbai University.In 1934,Shirwadkar obtained a Bachelor of Arts degree in Marathi and English languages, from the H. P. T. College in Nashik.. In 1944, he married Manorama (née : Gangubai Sonawani); she died in 1972). He was associated with Rajaram College, Kolhapur. Noted critic Keshav Rangnath Shirwadkar (1926-2018) was his younger brother.

== Career ==
While Shirwadkar was at the H. P. T. Arts College in Nashik, his poems were published in the Ratnakar (रत्नाकर) magazine. In 1932, at the age of 20, Shirwadkar participated in a satyagraha to support the demand for allowing the entry of the untouchables in the Kalaram Temple at Nashik.

In 1933, Shirwadkar established the Dhruv Mandal (ध्रुव मंडळ ) and started writing in a newspaper called Nava Manu (नवा मनू). In the same year, his first collection of poems, Jeevanlahari (जीवन लहरी), was published..

Shirwadkar joined Godavari Cinetone Ltd. in 1936 and wrote the screenplay for the movie Sati Sulochana (सती सुलोचना). He also acted in the movie as Lord Lakshmana. However, the film failed to be a success.

He later worked as a journalist. He wrote in periodicals such as Saptahik Prabha (साप्ताहिक प्रभा), Dainik Prabhat (दैनिक प्रभात), Saarathi (सारथी), Dhanurdari (धनुर्धारी), and Navayug (नवयुग). 1942 was a turning point in the career of Kusumagraj, as the father-figure of Marathi literature, Vishnu Sakharam Khandekar, published Kusumgraj's compilation of poetry, Vishakha (विशाखा) at his own expense, and in his preface describing Kusumagraj as a poet of humanity, wrote, "His words manifest the social discontent but retain the optimistic conviction that the old world was giving way to a new one." Its publication coincided with the Quit India Movement, and carried the message of freedom and stood against slavery, and soon its words became popular with young men and women; in time it was to become his lasting legacy to Indian literature.

After 1943, he started adapting the plays by literary giants like Oscar Wilde, Moliere, Maurice Maeterlinck and Shakespeare, especially his tragedies, and which played an important role in boosting Marathi theatre of the period. This continued into the 1970s when his masterpiece Natsamrat, styled after Shakespeare's play King Lear, was first staged in 1970, with Sriram Lagoo as the lead. In 1946, he wrote his first novel Vaishnav (वैष्णव) and his first play Doorche Dive (दूरचे दिवे). From 1946 to 1948, he also edited a weekly called Swadesh (स्वदेश).

While temperamentally he ranged from reclusive to exclusive, he had a keen social sense and championed the cause of the downtrodden without involving himself in ground level activities. In 1950, he founded the Lokahitawādi Mandal (लोकहितवादी; organisation for social good) in Nashik which is still in existence. He also edited certain academic textbooks for school students.

However, Kusumagraj's main claim to fame was as a poet and writer. In 1954, he adapted Shakespeare's Macbeth as Rajmukut (राजमुकुट), 'The Royal Crown' to Marathi. It starred Nanasaheb Phatak and Durga Khote (Lady Macbeth). He also adapted Othello in 1960. He also worked as a lyricist in Marathi cinema.

His work reflected the changing social milieu, from being the reflection of national uprising during Indian freedom struggle and in the post-independence era it got steeped into rising social-consciousness amongst Marathi writers, which marked the advent of modern Dalit literature.

Shirwadkar was also an active participant in the Samyukta Maharashtra Movement.

== Awards and recognition ==
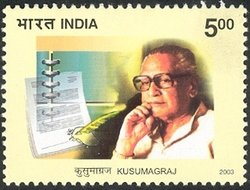
Kusumagraj Stamp of India - 2003

To honour his work in Marathi Literature, every year the birthday of Kusumagraj, 27 February, is celebrated as "Marathi Bhasha Din" (मराठी भाषा गौरव दिन) (transl. Marathi Language Day).

- 1961- President of Mumbai Marathi Granth Sangrahalay annual function
- 1960 - State Govt. for Marathi Mati 'मराठी माती' (काव्यसंग्रह)
- 1962 - State Govt. for Swagat 'स्वगत' (काव्यसंग्रह)
- 1964 - State Govt. for Himresha 'हिमरेषा' (काव्यसंग्रह)
- 1964 - President of Akhil Bharatiya Marathi Sahitya Sammelan, Margao, Goa
- 1965 - Ram Ganesh Gadkari Award 1965 by All India Nātya Parishad
- 1966 - State Govt. for the play Yayati ani Devyani 'ययाति आणि देवयानी'
- 1967 - State Govt. for the play Vij mhanali Dhartila 'वीज म्हणाली धरतीला'
- 1970 - President of Marathi Natya Sammelan, Kolhapur
- 1971 - State Govt. for the play Natsamrat 'नटससम्राट'
- 1974 - Sahitya Akademi Award 1974 for his writing of the play Natsamrat, an adaptation of King Lear
- 1985 - Ram Ganesh Gadkari Award from Akhil Bhatiya Natya Parishad
- 1986 - The honorary degree of D.Litt. by Pune University
- 1987 - Jnanpith Award — a prestigious literary award in India, in recognition of his literary achievements
- 1988 - Sangeet Nātya Lekhan Award
- 1989 - President — Jagtik Marathi Parishad, Mumbai
- 1991 - Padmabhushan award in the field of Literature & Education by the then President of India - R. Venkataraman
- 1996 - A star named as "Kusumagraj" in the galaxy

== Death ==
He died on 10 March 1999 in Nashik, where his home also served as the office of the Kusumāgraj Pratishthān.

== Writings ==
Collections of poems

- Vishākhā (1942)
- Himāreshā (1964)
- Chhandomayi (1982)
- Jeewanalahari (1933)
- Jaicha Kunja (1936)
- Samidhā (1947)
- Kana (1952)
- Marāthi Māti (1960)
- Wadāwel (1969)
- Rasyātrā (1969)
- Muktāyan (1985)
- Shrawan (1985)
- Prawāsi Pakshi (1989)
- Patheya (1989)
- Meghdoot (1956 Marāthi translation of Kālidās' Meghdoot, which is in Sanskrit)
- Swāgat (1962)
- Bālbodh Mevyātil Kusumāgraj (1989)

Edited collections of poems

- Kāwyawāhini
- Sāhityasuwarna
- Pimpalapān
- Chandanawel
- Rasyātrā, poems chosen by Shankar Vaidya and Poet Borkar, and with a long scholarly introduction by Vaidya

Collections of stories

- Phulawāli
- Chhote Āni Mothe
- Satāriche Bol Āni Iter Kathā
- Kāhi Wruddha, Kāhi Tarun
- Prem Āni Mānjar
- Appointment
- Āhe Āni Nāhi
- Wirāmachinhe
- Pratisād
- Ekāki Tārā
- Wātewaralyā Sāwalyā
- Shakespearechyā Shodhāt
- Roopareshā
- Kusumāgrajānchyā Bārā Kathā
- Jādoochi Hodi (for children)

Plays

- Yayāti Āni Dewayāni
- Weeja Mhanāli Dharateelā
- Natsamrāt
- Doorche Diwe
- Dusarā Peshwā
- Waijayanti
- Kounteya
- Rājmukut
- Āmche Nāw Bāburāo
- Widushak
- Ek Hoti Wāghin
- Ānand
- Mukhyamantri
- Chandra Jithe Ugawat Nāhi
- Mahant
- Kaikeyi
- Becket (translation of The Honour of God by Jean Anouilh)

One-act plays

- Diwāni Dāwā
- Dewāche Ghar
- Prakāshi Dāre
- Sangharsh
- Bet
- Nātak Basat Āhe Āni Itar Ekānkikā

Novels

- Waishnawa
- Jānhawi
- Kalpanechyā Teerāwar

== Works in translation ==
- The Saint in the Cellar: selected poems. Tr. by S. A. Virkar. New Native Pressure, 2003. ISBN 1-883197-18-X.

== Visualisation of works of Kusumagraj ==
The translation of Meghadūta by Kusumagraj was visualised by watercolour artist Nana Joshi. These visualisations were published in the Menaka Diwali issue in 1979. Natsamrat, a play written by V.V. Shirwadkar for which he won several accolades, was also adapted on screen by director Mahesh Manjrekar with veteran actor Nana Patekar as Natsamrat (2016), after successful runs of the play's theatre adaptations.

== See also ==
- Marathi Language Day
- List of Indian writers
