= Haidar Ali (actor) =

Indian actor

Haidar Ali (born 16 February 1948), also credited as Hyder Ali and Haider Ali, is an Indian film and television actor and screenwriter. He acted in an early Doordarshan TV Serial Nukkad (1986–87) as Raja. Later, Haidar Ali wrote the story of Ashutosh Gowarikar's historic film, Jodhaa Akbar (2008). He also had a cameo in the movie song Khwaja Mere Khwaja.

== Personal life ==
Haidar Ali is the youngest son of actress and model Pramila (Esther Victoria Abraham) and actor Kumar (real name Syed Hasan Ali Zaidi, who appeared in Mughal-e-Azam, Shri 420, and Watan). Pramila acted in 30 films, including Ulti Ganga, Bijli, Basant and Jungle King and also became the first major woman film producer, with 16 films under her Silver Productions banner.

== Career ==
Ali made his television debut with Nukkad in 1986 in the role of Raja. The series was by Kundan Shah and Saeed Akhtar Mirza. This was followed by Circus (1989), directed by Aziz Mirza, where he played the role of Ringmaster. Also acting in the series were actor Shahrukh Khan and director Ashutosh Gowariker. Over the years, he has worked as a character actor, with director Aziz Mirza in Phir Bhi Dil Hai Hindustani (2000), Chalte Chalte (2003) and Kismat Konnection (2008); With Sudhir Mishra in Main Zinda Hoon (1988) and Khoya Khoya Chand (2007); and with his former co-actor Gowariker in Baazi (1995) and Jodhaa Akbar (2008), in the latter he was also the writer of the film and co-screenplay writer, and had a cameo role in the song Khwaja Mere Khwaja.

== Filmography ==
=== Films ===
- Akriet (1981) (Marathi film)
- Saaransh (1984)
- Aaj (1987)
- Main Zinda Hoon (1988)
- Salim Langde Pe Mat Ro (1989) as Nathu Seth
- Lapandav (1993) (Marathi film) as Pawandutt
- Baazi (1995) as Inspector Damji
- Daayraa (1996) as Garage Owner
- Sarkarnama (1998) (Marathi film) as Srivastav, Govt Office employee
- Khoobsurat (1999)
- Phir Bhi Dil Hai Hindustani (2000) as Shahrukh's Father
- Love Ke Liye Kuch Bhi Karega (2001) as Dance master
- Chalte Chalte (2003) as Postman
- Khoya Khoya Chand (2007) as Michael
- Kismat Konnection (2008) as Mr. Bakshi
- Shortkut (2009) as Film Director
- Trump Card (2009)
- File 25 (2010)

=== Television ===
- Nukkad (1986–87) as Raja
- Circus (1989) as Ringmaster
- Filmi Chakkar (1993) as RameshBhai, Director, (Episode No 8) Guest Role
- Aahat (1995) Season 1(1995–2001)- Episode 92–93 The Call, Episode 116–117 Tasveer- Painter Vidhyadhar
