= 37th National Film Awards =

1990 Indian film award

- Awarded for: Best of Indian cinema in 1989
- Awarded by: Directorate of Film Festivals
- Presented by: R. Venkataraman (President of India)
- Announced on: 4 April 1990
- Presented on: May 1990
- Official website: dff.nic.in

Highlights
- Best Feature Film: Bagh Bahadur
- Best Non-Feature Film: Aar Koto Din
- Best Book: • Shataranj Ke Khiladi • Cinema, Kannakkum Kavithayum
- Best Film Critic: K. N. T. Sastry
- Dadasaheb Phalke Award: Lata Mangeshkar
- Most awards: • Mathilukal • Oru Vadakkan Veeragatha (4)

The 37th National Film Awards were presented by Directorate of Film Festivals, an organisation set up by Ministry of Information and Broadcasting, India to felicitate the best of Indian Cinema released in the year 1989. Ceremony took place in May 1990 and awards were presented by then President of India, R. Venkataraman.

Starting with 37th National Film Awards, a new award in the feature films section was introduced for Environment Conservation/Preservation as National Film Award for Best Film on Environment Conservation/Preservation and awarded with Rajat Kamal (Silver Lotus) for producer and director of the film. Another new award was introduced for National Film Award for Best First Non-Feature Film of a Director, but not given for 37th National Film Awards.

Also, National Film Award for Best Book on Cinema has been promoted to Swarna Kamal (Golden Lotus) Award.

== Awards ==
Awards were divided into feature films, non-feature films and books written on Indian cinema.

=== Lifetime Achievement Award ===
Name of Award	Image	Awardee(s)	Awarded As	Awards
Dadasaheb Phalke Award		Lata Mangeshkar	Playback singer	Swarna Kamal, ₹ 100,000 and a Shawl

=== Feature films ===
Feature films were awarded at All India as well as regional level. For 37th National Film Awards, a Bengali film, Bagh Bahadur won the National Film Award for Best Feature Film whereas two Malayalam films, Mathilukal and Oru Vadakkan Veeragatha won the maximum number of awards (4). Following were the awards given in each category:

==== Juries ====
A committee headed by Atma Ram was appointed to evaluate the feature films awards. Following were the jury members:

- Jury Members
  - Atma Ram (Chairperson) • Basu Bhattacharya • Iqbal Masood • K. G. George • Sitakant Misra • Mahendran • A. Pundarikakshayya • Kundan Shah • Aribam Syam Sharma • Dilip Kumar Hazarika • Bhimsen • R. Lakshman • Valampuri Somanathan • Saikat Bhattacharya • Sreekumaran Thampi • D. V. Narasa Raju

==== All India Award ====
Following were the awards given:

===== Golden Lotus Award =====
Official Name: Swarna Kamal

All the awardees are awarded with 'Golden Lotus Award (Swarna Kamal)', a certificate and cash prize.

Name of Award	Name of Film	Language	Awardee(s)	Cash prize
Best Feature Film	Bagh Bahadur	Bengali	Producer: Buddhadeb Dasgupta	₹ 50,000/-
Best Feature Film	Bagh Bahadur	Bengali	director: Buddhadeb Dasgupta	₹ 25,000/-
Best Feature Film	Citation: For its portrayal of the steady destruction of rural folk traditions at the hands of a cheap and showy urban culture in the form a cinematically vibrant and heroic classical tragedy.			
Best Debut Film of a Director	Wosobipo	Karbi	Producer: Karbi Anglong District Council; Director: Gautam Bora	₹ 25,000/- Each
Best Debut Film of a Director	Citation: For its fresh and original evocation of the collective unconscious of a hill tribe whose way of life has been disintegrating over the last four decades, as seen through the eyes of a boy growing up into the responsibilities of manhood.			
Best Popular Film Providing Wholesome Entertainment	Chandni	Hindi	Producer: Yash Raj Films	₹ 40,000/-
Best Popular Film Providing Wholesome Entertainment	Chandni	Hindi	Director: Yash Chopra	₹ 20,000/-
Best Popular Film Providing Wholesome Entertainment	Citation: For providing clean and romantic entertainment illuminated with smooth performances and fresh lyrics in folk form.			
Best Popular Film Providing Wholesome Entertainment	Geethanjali	Telugu	Producer: M/s Bhagyalakshmi Enterprises	₹ 40,000/-
Best Popular Film Providing Wholesome Entertainment	Geethanjali	Telugu	Director: Mani Ratnam	₹ 20,000/-
Best Popular Film Providing Wholesome Entertainment	Citation: For its innovative approach in depicting youthful passion.			
Best Children's Film	Ankur Maina Aur Kabootar	Hindi	Producer: Children's Film Society	₹ 30,000/-
Best Children's Film	Ankur Maina Aur Kabootar	Hindi	Director: Madan Bawaria	₹ 15,000/-
Best Children's Film	Citation: For its involvement of children in the fight for preservation of wildlife in the exotically shot isle of Mauritius.			
Best Children's Film	Jamboo Savari	Kannada	Producer: K. S. L. Swame (Lalitha Ravee)	₹ 30,000/-
Best Children's Film	Jamboo Savari	Kannada	Director: K. S. L. Swame (Lalitha Ravee)	₹ 15,000/-
Best Children's Film	Citation: For the way in which it establishes the conflict between a child's instinctive love for a wild animal and the reality of man-animal relationships in the modern world, along with the resolution of that conflict.			
Best Direction	Mathilukal	Malayalam	Adoor Gopalakrishnan	₹ 50,000/-
Best Direction	Citation: For successfully capturing the spirit of the short story on his prison days by the celebrated writer Vaikkom Mohammed Basheer.			

===== Silver Lotus Award =====
Official Name: Rajat Kamal

All the awardees are awarded with 'Silver Lotus Award (Rajat Kamal)', a certificate and cash prize.

Name of Award	Name of Film	Language	Awardee(s)	Cash prize
Second Best Feature Film	Parshuramer Kuthar	Bengali	Producer: Dhurjati Prasad Mukherji	₹30,000/-
Second Best Feature Film	Parshuramer Kuthar	Bengali	Director: Nabyendu Chatterjee	₹15,000/-
Second Best Feature Film	Citation: For the moving fashion in which it elaborates the political and social hypocrisy of a town's middle class and its exploitation of a woman who is both the object of desire and the prey.			
Best Feature Film on National Integration	Santha Shishunala Sharifa	Kannada	Producer: M/s Yajaman Enterprises	₹ 30,000/-
Best Feature Film on National Integration	Santha Shishunala Sharifa	Kannada	Director: T. S. Nagabharana	₹ 15,000/-
Best Feature Film on National Integration	Citation: For its depiction of unity of religions at the popular mystical level illustrated by the life and lyrics of a famous Muslim saint who has a Hindu guru.			
Best Film on Family Welfare	Sandhya Raagam	Tamil	Producer: Balu Mahendra (A Doordarshan production)	₹ 30,000/-
Best Film on Family Welfare	Sandhya Raagam	Tamil	Director: Balu Mahendra	₹ 15,000/-
Best Film on Family Welfare	Citation: For the humanity with which it traces a character coming to terms with the problem of old age through suffering, resolution and understanding.			
Best Film on Other Social Issues	Unnikuttant Joli Kitty	Malayalam	Producer: V. R. Gopinath	₹ 30,000/-
Best Film on Other Social Issues	Unnikuttant Joli Kitty	Malayalam	Director: V. R. Gopinath	₹ 15,000/-
Best Film on Other Social Issues	Citation: For its bleak narration of an unemployed youth becoming an unemployable due to callous social attitudes.			
Best Film on Environment Conservation / Preservation	Bonani	Assamese	Producer: M/s Purbanchal Film Co-operative Society Ltd.	₹ 30,000/-
Best Film on Environment Conservation / Preservation	Bonani	Assamese	Director: Jahnu Barua	₹ 15,000/-
Best Film on Environment Conservation / Preservation	Citation: For its delicate and nuanced description of a forest official's struggle against mercenary and bureaucratic despoilation of forests.			
Best Actor	• Mathilukal • Oru Vadakkan Veeragatha	Malayalam	Mammootty	₹ 10,000/-
Best Actor	Citation: For successfully portraying the multifaceted roles.			
Best Actress	Parshuramer Kuthar	Bengali	Sreelekha Mukherji	₹ 10,000/-
Best Actress	Citation: For bringing out the agony and pain of a helpless woman forced by society to live an ignoble life.			
Best Supporting Actor	Parinda	Hindi	Nana Patekar	₹ 10,000/-
Best Supporting Actor	Citation: For his unique portrayal of a psychotic character.			
Best Supporting Actress	Pudhea Paadhai	Tamil	Manorama	₹ 10,000/-
Best Supporting Actress	Citation: For the versatility shown.			
Best Child Artist	Kalat Nakalat	Marathi	Mrinmayee Chandorkar	₹ 5,000/-
Best Child Artist	Citation: For her innocent and spontaneous portrayal.			
Best Male Playback Singer	Chhandaneer	Bengali	Ajoy Chakrabarty	₹ 10,000/-
Best Male Playback Singer	Citation: For bringing the rare depth of emotion, adomed by his command on the classical idiom.			
Best Female Playback Singer	Kalat Nakalat ("Hey Ek Reshami Gharate")	Marathi	Anuradha Paudwal	₹ 10,000/-
Best Female Playback Singer	Citation: For her clear and mellifluous rendering of the song.			
Best Cinematography	Salim Langde Pe Mat Ro	Hindi	Camera operator: Virendra Saini; Laboratory processing: M/s Ad-labs	₹ 10,000/- Each
Best Cinematography	Citation: For the high technical skills shown in evoking the special ethos of the film.			
Best Screenplay	Oru Vadakkan Veeragatha	Malayalam	M. T. Vasudevan Nair	₹ 10,000/-
Best Screenplay	Citation: For the gripping plot, clearly etched characterisations and the brilliant portrayal of life in Kerala a few hundred years ago.			
Best Audiography	Mathilukal	Malayalam	Harikumar	₹ 10,000/-
Best Audiography	Citation: For perfection noticeable throughout the in creatively helping the director to capture the mood and sustain interest within the enclosed walls of a jail.			
Best Editing	Parinda	Hindi	Renu Saluja	₹ 10,000/-
Best Editing	Citation: For her brisk and precise cutting and the creative heights to which she has taken the film with her intelligent and intuitive knowledge of her art.			
Best Art Direction	Oru Vadakkan Veeragatha	Malayalam	P. Krishnamoorthy	₹ 10,000/-
Best Art Direction	Citation: For adding to the aesthetic value of the film as a whole by carefully recreating the essence of the reality of a bygone era in Kerala with minute attention to details of pros and decor.			
Best Costume Design	Oru Vadakkan Veeragatha	Malayalam	P. Krishnamoorthy	₹ 10,000/-
Best Costume Design	Citation: For his intimate knowledge, artistic competence and the brilliant execution of the costumes of a bygone era, recreating the reality of life in the past as few films have done.			
Best Music Direction	Wosobipo	Karbi	Sher Chowdhary	₹ 10,000/-
Best Music Direction	Citation: For depicting life in interior Assam with a unique background score.			
Best Lyrics	Chhandaneer	Bengali	Satarupa Sanyal	₹ 10,000/-
Best Lyrics	Citation: For rare poetic heights reached in all the lyrics for the film.			
Special Jury Award	Kaal Abhirati	Bengali	Amitabh Chakraborty	₹ 10,000/-
Special Jury Award	Citation: For having had the courage of his convictions in making this experimental film which sets out to explore new horizons in the realm of film making.			
Special Mention	Daddy	Hindi	Anupam Kher	Certificate Only
Special Mention	Citation: For having played with great finesse and an unequalled range, the role of a gifted artiste hurt by unfortunate personal relationships.			Certificate Only
Special Mention	Kireedam	Malayalam	Mohanlal	Certificate Only
Special Mention	Citation: For portraying young man's agony and pain marvellously and in unique style.			Certificate Only

==== Regional Awards ====
The award is given to best film in the regional languages in India.

Name of Award	Name of Film	Awardee(s)	Cash prize
Best Feature Film in Bengali	Ganashatru	Producer: NFDC	₹ 20,000/-
Best Feature Film in Bengali	Ganashatru	Director: Satyajit Ray	₹ 10,000/-
Best Feature Film in Bengali	Citation: For its brilliant adaptation of Ibsen's "An Enemy of the People" to highlight the dangers of current revivalism.		
Best Feature Film in Gujarati	Percy	Producer: NFDC	₹ 20,000/-
Best Feature Film in Gujarati	Percy	Director: Pervez Merwanji	₹ 10,000/-
Best Feature Film in Gujarati	Citation: For its searing exploration of the neuroses and the claustrophobic embrace of an ingrown familial culture.		
Best Feature Film in Hindi	Salim Langde Pe Mat Ro	Producer: NFDC	₹ 20,000/-
Best Feature Film in Hindi	Salim Langde Pe Mat Ro	Director: Saeed Akhtar Mirza	₹ 10,000/-
Best Feature Film in Hindi	Citation: For its novel examination of the nexus between urban lumpen life, crime and religious revivalism.		
Best Feature Film in Kannada	Mane	Producer: Apoorva Chitra	₹ 20,000/-
Best Feature Film in Kannada	Mane	Director: Girish Kasaravalli	₹ 10,000/-
Best Feature Film in Kannada	Citation: For setting out the contradictions in the urban middle class search, both for moral legitimacy and security, in a corrupt social structure.		
Best Feature Film in Malayalam	Mathilukal	Producer: Adoor Gopalakrishnan	₹ 20,000/-
Best Feature Film in Malayalam	Mathilukal	Director: Adoor Gopalakrishnan	₹ 10,000/-
Best Feature Film in Malayalam	Citation: For its remarkable creation of an imprisoned writer's mind hovering between the pain of confinement, existential apprehension of death and the hallucinatory "reality" of sensual love.		
Best Feature Film in Marathi	Kalat Nakalat	Producer: Smita Talwalkar	₹ 20,000/-
Best Feature Film in Marathi	Kalat Nakalat	Director: Kanchan Nayak	₹ 10,000/-
Best Feature Film in Marathi	Citation: For its delicate description of the tension of love in various facets – wife, mistress and children – and the resolution of tensions in favour of keeping a family together.		
Best Feature Film in Oriya	Andha Diganta	Producer: Vox Visuals Pvt. Ltd.	₹ 20,000/-
Best Feature Film in Oriya	Andha Diganta	Director: Manmohan Mahapatra	₹ 10,000/-
Best Feature Film in Oriya	Citation: For its unemotional description of the increasing misery of a peasant who discovers his inadequacy in fighting his economic servitude and his own bourgeois attitude towards his wife's past.		
Best Feature Film in Punjabi	Marhi Da Deeva	Producer: NFDC	₹ 20,000/-
Best Feature Film in Punjabi	Marhi Da Deeva	Director: Surinder Singh	₹ 10,000/-
Best Feature Film in Punjabi	Citation: For its depiction of the pain and tragedy involved in the transformation of feaudalism into capitalism, which entails destruction and degradation of normal human relationships like friendship and love.		
Best Feature Film in Tamil	Pudhea Paadhai	Producer: A. Sundaram	₹ 20,000/-
Best Feature Film in Tamil	Pudhea Paadhai	Director: R. Parthiepan	₹ 10,000/-
Best Feature Film in Tamil	Citation: For its depiction of the transforming effects of a woman's courage and devotion on her husband.		
Best Feature Film in Telugu	Suthradharulu	Producer: Sudhakar Reddy and C. Karunakar Rao	₹ 20,000/-
Best Feature Film in Telugu	Suthradharulu	Director: K. Viswanath	₹ 10,000/-
Best Feature Film in Telugu	Citation: For the way it charts the conquest of social oppression by spiritual understanding and peace.		

=== Non-Feature Films ===
Short Films made in any Indian language and certified by the Central Board of Film Certification as a documentary/newsreel/fiction are eligible for non-feature film section.

==== Juries ====
A committee headed by Jagat Murari was appointed to evaluate the non-feature films awards. Following were the jury members:

- Jury Members
  - Jagat Murari (Chairperson) • Tapan K. Bose • Santosh Sivan • Ghanashyam Mahapatra • Paresh Mehta

==== Golden Lotus Award ====
Official Name: Swarna Kamal

All the awardees are awarded with 'Golden Lotus Award (Swarna Kamal)', a certificate and cash prize.

Name of Award	Name of Film	Language	Awardee(s)	Cash prize
Best Non-Feature Film	Aar Koto Din	Bengali	Producer: Department of Information and Cultural Affairs India, Government of West Bengal; Director: Shashi Anand	₹ 15,000/- Each
Best Non-Feature Film	Citation: For a brilliant cinematic exposition of deep anguish and helplessness at the fate of large section of the children of our country.			

==== Silver Lotus Award ====
Official Name: Rajat Kamal

All the awardees are awarded with 'Silver Lotus Award (Rajat Kamal)' and cash prize.

Name of Award	Name of Film	Language	Awardee(s)	Cash prize
Best Anthropological / Ethnographic Film	Baiga	Hindi	Producer: Madhya Pradesh Madhyam; Director: Rajendra Janglay	₹ 10,000/- Each
Best Anthropological / Ethnographic Film	Citation: For its well researched portrayal of life, culture and customs of tribal community.			
Best Biographical Film	C. V. Raman: The Scientist and His Legacy	English	Producer: N. K. Saigal; Director: Nandan Kudhyadi	₹ 10,000/- Each
Best Biographical Film	Citation: For being an innovative and sensitive biography of a great scientist, C. V. Raman, portraying his achievements, trials and tribulations.			
Best Arts / Cultural Film	Siddheshwari	Hindi	Producer: Mani Kaul; Director: Mani Kaul	₹ 10,000/- Each
Best Arts / Cultural Film	Citation: For its innovative and stylised interpretation of a singer's work and her milieu.			
Best Scientific Film (including Environment and Ecology)	Neuropathic Foot in Leprosy	English	Producer: Jal Mehta; Director: Vishram Revankar	₹ 10,000/- Each
Best Scientific Film (including Environment and Ecology)	Citation: For a well made specialised film effectively communicating the course of treatment in a serious disease.			
Best Environment / Conservation / Preservation Film	The Deer on the Lake	English	Producer: Aribam Syam Sharma; Director: Aribam Syam Sharma	₹ 10,000/- Each
Best Environment / Conservation / Preservation Film	Citation: For the creative use of the cinematic medium in explaining the complexities of the ecosystem of the Loktak lake, its floating islands and the greed of man that led to the near extinction of the Sangai, the Deer of Manipur.			
Best Promotional Film	Tuna: The Chicken of the Sea	English	Producer: D. Gautaman; Director: K. Jagajivan Ram	₹ 10,000/- Each
Best Promotional Film	Citation: For being competent and engaging depiction of the Tuna fishing industry.			
Best Agricultural Film	Integrated Pest Management in Cotton	English	Producer: D. Gautaman; Director: K. Jagajivan Ram	₹ 10,000/- Each
Best Agricultural Film	Citation: For its efforts towards generating awareness regarding the importance of bio-control in integrated pest management.			
Best Historical Reconstruction / Compilation Film	Chhapakhanar Bangla Haraf	Bengali	Producer: Shreemati Chatterjee and Chandrika Bhattacharjee; Director: Abhijit Chattopadhyay	₹ 10,000/- Each
Best Historical Reconstruction / Compilation Film	Citation: For achieving a creative blend of research and imagination in depicting the history of Bengali printing.			₹ 10,000/- Each
Best Historical Reconstruction / Compilation Film	Kathni Karni Eksi (Jamanalal Bajaj)	Hindi	Producer: M/s Climb Films; Director: Bhim Sain	₹ 10,000/- Each
Best Historical Reconstruction / Compilation Film	Citation: For its authentic recreation of the life and times of the late Shri Jamnalal Bajaj.			₹ 10,000/- Each
Best Film on Social Issues	The Limp in the Niche	English	Producer: Girish Karnad; Director: Girish Karnad	₹ 10,000/- Each
Best Film on Social Issues	Citation: For being illuminating exposition of a very humane philosophy, preaching universal brotherhood, harmony and equality of all living beings.			
Best Educational / Motivational / Instructional Film	Ser Alang	Karbi	Producer: Horticulturist, Karbi Anglong; Director: Indrajit Narayan Deb	₹ 10,000/- Each
Best Educational / Motivational / Instructional Film	Yun Sikhlayen Akhar	Hindi	Producer: M/s Ramesh Asher Films; Director: Ramesh Asher	₹ 10,000/- Each
Best Educational / Motivational / Instructional Film	Citation: For their sensitive handling of motivational messages through the medium of cinema.			₹ 10,000/- Each
Best Animation Film	My Tree		Producer: Vijay B. Chandra; Director: B. R. Shendge and R. R. Swamy; Animator: R. R. Swamy and V. S. Shankardas	₹ 10,000/- Each
Best Animation Film	Citation: For effectively communicating man's alienation from nature.			
Best Short Fiction Film	Behula	Bengali	Producer: Raja Mitra; Director: Raja Mitra	₹ 10,000/- Each
Best Short Fiction Film	Citation: For a story well told.			
Best Film on Family Welfare	Boy or Girl – How?	Hindi	Producer: B. R. Shendge; Director: R. R. Swamy	₹ 10,000/- Each
Best Film on Family Welfare	Citation: For effectively communicating an important message.			
Special Jury Award	Kalamandalam Krishnankutty Poduval	Malayalam	K. R. Mohanan (director)	₹ 5,000/-
Special Jury Award	Citation: For excellence in the use of cinema in projecting the intricate relationship between the drummer and the dancer in Kathakali.			

=== Best Writing on Cinema ===
The awards aim at encouraging study and appreciation of cinema as an art form and dissemination of information and critical appreciation of this art-form through publication of books, articles, reviews etc.

==== Juries ====
A committee headed by Mrinal Pande was appointed to evaluate the writing on Indian cinema. Following were the jury members:

- Jury Members
  - Mrinal Pande (Chairperson) • Firooze Rangoonwala • C. Radhakrishnan

==== Golden Lotus Award ====
Official Name: Swarna Kamal

All the awardees are awarded with 'Golden Lotus Award (Swarna Kamal)' and cash prize.

Name of Award	Name of Book	Language	Awardee(s)	Cash prize
Best Book on Cinema	Shataranj Ke Khiladi	Hindi	Author: Surendranath Tiwari; Publisher: Madhya Pradesh Film Development Corporation	₹ 10,000/- Each
Best Book on Cinema	Citation: For painstakingly analysing and delineating the interrelationship between a literary masterpiece and its film version, created by a master of cinema, without overlooking the salient characteristics of each art form.			
Best Book on Cinema	Cinema, Kannakkum Kavithayum	Malayalam	Author: Sreekumaran Thampi; Publisher: Sahithya Pravarthaka Co-op Society Ltd.	₹ 10,000/- Each
Best Book on Cinema	Citation: For portraying the development of the medium poetically by blending its ethos and technique.			

==== Silver Lotus Award ====
Official Name: Rajat Kamal

All the awardees are awarded with 'Silver Lotus Award (Rajat Kamal)' and cash prize.

Name of Award	Language	Awardee(s)	Cash prize
Best Film Critic	Telugu	K. N. T. Sastry	₹ 5,000/-
Best Film Critic	Citation: For combining the rare ability to comprehend the quintessential beauty of the bygone era and for reflecting the contemporary trends in cinema. The Jury also appreciates the wide range of topics covered by him.		

=== Awards not given ===
Following were the awards not given as no film was found to be suitable for the award:

- Best Feature Film in Assamese
- Best Feature Film in English
- Best Feature Film in Manipuri
- Best First Non-Feature Film
- National Film Award for Best Non-Feature Film Direction
- Best Exploration / Adventure Film
