= Esther Victoria Abraham =

Indian model and actress (1916-2006)

Pramila
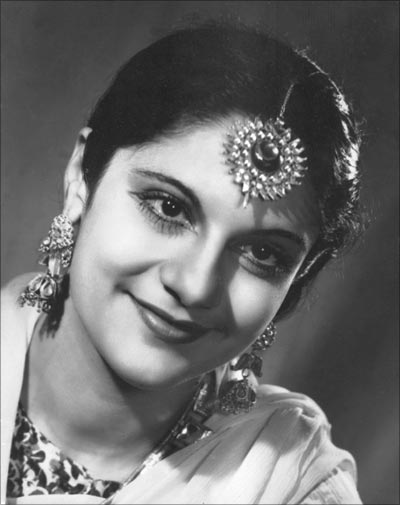
- Born: Esther Victoria Abraham; 30 December 1916; Calcutta, Bengal Presidency, British India
- Died: 6 August 2006 (aged 89); Mumbai, Maharashtra, India
- Occupations: Model; Actress
- Children: Haidar Ali

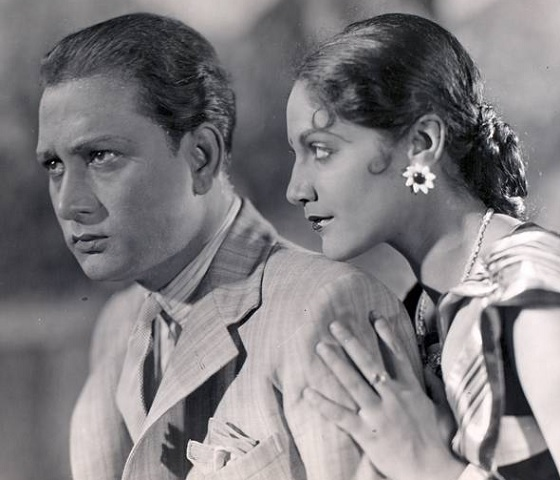
Pramila in the 1936 film Hamari Betiya

Esther Victoria Abraham (30 December 1916 – 6 August 2006), better known by her stage name Pramila, was an Indian actress, model, and beauty pageant titleholder. She is the first woman film producer in the Hindi film industry. She is also well known for winning the first Miss India pageant in 1947.

== Personal life ==
Pramila was born in 1916 in Calcutta (now Kolkata) to a Baghdadi Jewish family. She was the daughter of Reuben Abraham, a Jewish businessman from Kolkata, by his second wife Matilda Isaac, a Jewish lady from Karachi. Pramila had three older half-siblings from her father's first marriage to a certain Leah, and six (or five) siblings from her own parents' marriage.

Pramila was married twice, once at age 16 and then in 1939, Pramila married again, becoming the second wife of her second husband. This was the small-time actor Syed Hasan Ali Zaidi, a practicing Shia Muslim whose stage name was "Kumar." Among Zaidi's more noticeable roles was that of the sculptor in Mughal-e-Azam. Pramila had to abandon Judaism and convert to Islam in order to marry Zaidi, and this happened when antisemitism was at its height in Europe. Pramila and Zaidi had four children together. In 1963, shortly after the release of Mughal-E-Azam, Zaidi chose to leave Pramila and their children and move to Pakistan. Pramila remained in India, where she acted in some more films, and also produced a few films.

Pramila's youngest son, Haidar Ali, has pursued a career in films and television. He acted in the TV serial Nukkad and more recently, the song Khwaja Mere Khwaja in the film Jodhaa Akbar (2008) was picturized with him playing the main singer. Pramila's daughter Naqi Jahan was crowned Eve's Weekly Miss India in 1967, making them the only mother-daughter pair to have won the Miss India title. Naqi Jehan also represented India at the Queen of the Pacific Quest beauty pageant in Australia.

Pramila died on 6 August 2006 aged nearly 90.

== Career ==
Pramila was the winner of the first Miss India pageant, in 1947 and at the age of 31. Her first job in the entertainment industry was as a dancer for a Parsi theatre company, dancing during the 15 minutes pause while the reel projector was changed. Pramila acted as a fearless stunt star in 30 films, including Ulti Ganga, Bijli, Basant (film) and Jungle King. She also became the first major woman film producer in India, with 16 films under her banner Silver Productions. Morarji Desai, the then Chief Minister of Bombay, had her were arrested because she was suspected of spying for Pakistan, due to her constant travels to that country. However, it was later proven that she travelled to promote her films.

Besides her career in film, she was also a graduate of the University of Cambridge, and became a teacher. She also designed her own film costumes and jewelry.

=== Silver Films ===
In 1942, her husband, actor M. Kumar, who was working for the Ranjit studio, was dismissed. Together with Chandramohan, he founded the Silver Films production company, with which Pramila became associated as an actress and producer. Together with Mr. Kumar and Chandramohan, she starred in Jhankar, the new company's first film, of which her husband was officially the producer.

However, she was credited as a producer in many of the subsequent films made by Silver Films or its subsidiaries. She also acted in almost all her own productions, often in secondary roles, and sometimes even strayed from the Silver Films fold, as in Beqasoor (1950) with Durga Khote, or Hamari Beti (1950) with actress Shobhna Samarth, which helped launch Nutan's career.

From the mid-1940s onwards, Pramila and Kumar set up other production companies such as Shama Productions to promote young talent, Kumar Studios Limited for films directed by Kumar and later, United Artists to launch their children into the world of cinema. But production did not go smoothly. For example, Aap Beeti (1948), about relations between India and Pakistan, was banned from the screen and never presented to the public. In all, she produced or co-produced thirteen films, but none of them caught on with audiences.

== Filmography ==
- Return of the Toofan Mail, directed by R.S. Chaudhary (1935)
- Bhikaran, directed by P.K. Atharti (1935)
- Mahamaya, directed by Gunjal (1936)
- Hamari Betiya / Our Darling Daughters, directed by R.S. Chaudhary (1936)
- Saria, directed by Shanti Dave (1936)
- Mere Lai, directed by Gunjal (1937)
- Mother India, directed by Dada Gunjal (1938)
- Bijlee, directed by Balwant Bhatt (1939)
- Hukum Ka Ekka, directed by Shanti Dave (1939)
- Jungle King, directed by Nari Ghadialli (1939)
- Kahan Hai Manzil Ten, directed by S.M. Yussuf (1939)
- Sardar, directed by Dwarka Khosla (1940)
- Kanchan, directed by Leela Chitnis (1941)
- Shahzaadi, directed by J.P. Advani (1941)
- Basant, directed by Amiya Chakrabarty (1942)
- Jhankar, directed by S. Khalil (1942)
- Saheli, directed by S.M. Yussuf (1942)
- Ulti Ganga, directed by K. Dhaiber (1942)
- Bade Nawab Saheb, directed by B.D. Vedi (1944)
- Naseeb, directed by B.D. Vedi (1945)
- Devar, directed by S.M. Yussuf (1946)
- Nehle Pe Dehla, directed by S.M. Yussuf (1946)
- Sal Gira, directed by K.S. Dariani (1946)
- Shalimar, directed by Roop K. Shorey (1946)
- Doosri Shaadi, directed by Ram Dariani (1947)
- Aap Beeti, directed by M. Kumar (1948)
- Beqasoor, directed by K. Amamath (1950)
- Hamari Beti, directed by Shobhna Samarth (1950)
- Dhoon, directed by M. Kumar (1953)
- Majboori / Choti Bahen, directed by Ram Dariani (1954)
- Badal Aur Bijlee, directed by Maurice Abraham (1956)
- Fighting Queen, directed by Nari Ghadiali (1956)
- Jungle King, directed by Masud (1959)
- Bahana, directed by M. Kumar (1960)
- Murad, directed by Nari Ghadiali (1961)
- Quest, directed by Amol Palekar (2006)
