= Mohan Joshi Hazir Ho! =

- Directed by: Saeed Akhtar Mirza
- Written by: Yusuf Mehta (Screenplay); Saeed Akhtar Mirza (Story); Sudhir Mishra (Dialogue)
- Produced by: Saeed Akhtar Mirza
- Starring: Naseeruddin Shah; Deepti Naval; Bhisham Sahni; Dina Pathak
- Cinematography: Virendra Saini
- Edited by: Renu Saluja
- Music by: Vanraj Bhatia
- Release date: 1984
- Running time: 130 minutes
- Country: India
- Language: Hindi

Mohan Joshi Hazir Ho! (transl. "Mohan Joshi, please present yourself in court" or "Let Mohan Joshi be present".) is a 1984 Indian Hindi-language film, directed by Saeed Akhtar Mirza, based on his own story.

The film is a comic satire on a judicial system, where cases drag on for decades, where plaintiffs either die or lose hope and money, while the corrupt run scot free, thanks to their nexus with corrupt lawyers.

It won the 1984 National Film Award for Best Film on Family Welfare.

== Plot ==
An elderly couple, Mohan Joshi and his wife, sue their landlord for not maintaining their 'collapsing' apartment building. For this, they hire two cunning lawyers.

The court case drags on for years and the lawyers milk the old couple dry, while they become rich. Back home in the society, the old couple is ridiculed for fighting the landlord, but they fight on nevertheless.

In the end, when the judge comes to check the condition of the chawl, the landlord's men prop up the place, thus convincing the judge that all is well. Finally, Joshi gathers all his strength and pulls down the temporary supports put up by the men causing the building to collapse on himself.

== Cast ==
- Naseeruddin Shah as Advocate Malkani
- Bhisham Sahni as Mohan Joshi
- Dina Pathak as Rohini Joshi
- Deepti Naval as Asha Joshi
- Mohan Gokhale as Sudhir Joshi
- Rohini Hattangadi as Advocate Rani
- Pankaj Kapur as Promoter 1
- Amjad Khan as Kundan Kapadia, landlord
- Satish Shah as Advocate Gokhale
- Salim Ghouse as Promoter 2
- Anjali Paigankar as Mala
- Deepak Qazir as Advocate Desai
- Arvind Deshpande as Khandke
