= Anil Chaudhary =

Anil Chaudhary may refer to:

- Anil Chaudhary (umpire)
- Anil Chaudhary (politician)
- Anil Chaudhary (filmmaker)
