= 35th Filmfare Awards South =

Award ceremony for South Indian films

- Date: August 14, 1988
- Site: Chennai

The 35th Filmfare Awards South ceremony, honoring the winners of the best of South Indian cinema in 1987, was held at Madras music academy, on August 14, 1988. Filmfare regional south Indian films awards winners were announced on July 15, 1988.The Chief guests of the function is the governor of Tamilnadu Dr. Alexander & Mr. Krishnamurthy (executive secretary & director of Bennet, Coleman & co.).

== Jury ==
Telugu & Kannada	Tamil & Malayalam
Justice P. K. Sethuraman; Ajit B. Mantagani; G. Dwarkanathan; A. S. Ravi Prakash; A. D. Vittal Rao	Justice P. Bhaskaran; Smt. Akila Sivaraman; S. Viswanathan; Smt. Lakshmi Krishnamurthy; Smt. Radha Balakrishnan

== Awards ==
=== Kannada cinema ===
Best Film	Best Director
Pushpaka Vimana - Shringar Nagaraj	Singeetam Srinivasa Rao - Pushpaka Vimana
Best Actor	Best Actress
Kamal Haasan - Pushpaka Vimana	Geetha - Shruthi Seridaaga

=== Malayalam cinema ===
Best Film	Best Director
Thaniyavarthanam - V. Nandakumar	Prathap K. Pothan - Rithubhedam
Best Actor	Best Actress
Nedumudi Venu - Oru Minnaminunginte Nurunguvettam	Sharada - Oru Minnaminunginte Nurunguvettam

=== Tamil cinema ===
Best Film	Best Director
Vedham Pudhithu - Bharathiraja	Bharathiraja - Vedham Pudhithu
Best Actor	Best Actress
Sathyaraj - Vedham Pudhithu	Radhika - Neethikku Thandanai

=== Telugu cinema ===
Best Film	Best Director
Padamati Sandhya Ragam - G.Subbarao	K. Viswanath - Sruthilayalu
Best Actor	Best Actress
Akkineni Nageswara Rao - Aatma Bandhuvulu	Vijayashanti - Swayam Krushi

== Awards presentation ==
- Sarada (Best Actress Malayalam) received award from Akkineni Nageswara Rao
- Prathap Pothan (Best Director Malayalam) received award from Radhika
- Bharathi Raja (Best Director Tamil) received award from L. V. Prasad
- Kamal Haasan (Best Actor Kannada) received award from M. Saravanan
- Sathyaraj (Best Actor Tamil) received award from Saritha
