= Sameer Khakhar =

Indian Hindi television and movie actor

- Born: 9 August 1952
- Died: 15 March 2023 (aged 70)
- Occupation: Actor
- Years active: 1984–1998; 2013–2023

Sameer Khakhar (9 August 1952 – 15 March 2023) was an Indian film and television actor in Bollywood. Some of Sameer Khakhar's notable work was in TV shows Nukkad, Circus and Shrimaan Shrimati, and films such as Pushpaka Vimana, Parinda and Jai Ho.

== Life and career ==
Khakhar's notable TV serial roles include that of the drunken character Khopdi from yesteryears milestone TV serial Nukkad in 1986, directed by Kundan Shah and Saeed Akhtar Mirza. His most memorable film role was in the dialogue-free Pushpaka Vimana (1987) of the alcoholic businessman who gets kidnapped by the hero – Kamal Haasan.

Khakhar died from multiple organ failure on 15 March 2023, at the age of 71.

== Filmography ==
=== Films ===
- 1985 Chhun Chhun Karti Aayee Chidiya (Video)
- 1987 Jawab Hum Denge – Kulkarni
- 1987 Pushpaka Vimana (Silent film) – Rich man (as Samir Khakhar)
- 1988 Mere Baad
- 1988 Mera Shikar
- 1988 Shahenshah
- 1989 Guru - Sameer
- 1989 Nafrat Ki Aandhi
- 1989 Parinda – Iqbal
- 1989 Rakhwaala – Drunk
- 1989 Shehzaade – Suraj's friend
- 1989 Vardi – Havaldar
- 1989 Jurrat – Makkhan Singh
- 1990 Awwal Number – Rao – Terrorist
- 1991 Baarish
- 1992 Pyar Deewana Hota Hain
- 1993 Dhartiputra – Orphanage Manager
- 1993 Hum Hain Kamaal Ke – Constable Panna (as Sameer Kakad)
- 1993 Kirdaar (TV Series) – Dhelisa Singh – Mukhbir
- 1993 Tahqiqaat – Salim
- 1994 Dilbar – Drunk (as Sameer Khakad)
- 1994 Dilwale – Orderly (as Samir Khakhar)
- 1994 Eena Meena Deeka – Eena's Neighbour (uncredited)
- 1994 Insaaf Apne Lahoo Se – Rani's Father (as Sameer Khakkad)
- 1994 Prem Shakti – Kewalchand
- 1994 Raja Babu – Amavas
- 1995 Aatank Hi Aatank (as Samir Khakkar)
- 1995 Police Lockup – Havaldar
- 1995 Takkar (as Sameer Khakkar)
- 1995 Teen Chor (Short)
- 1996 Return of Jewel Thief – Cameraman (as Sameer Khakkar)
- 1997 Agni Morcha
- 1998 Chal Aati Hai Kya Khandala (TV Movie)
- 1998 Khote Sikkey (as Sameer Khakar)
- 2014 Hasee Toh Phasee – Alpesh Bhai
- 2014 Jai Ho – Drunken Man
- 2017 Patel Ki Punjabi Shaadi
- 2017 Wassup! Zindagi – Rehaan's Father
- 2018 Patakha (vaidhya)

=== Television ===
Year	Title	Role	Channel
1986–1987	Nukkad	Khopdi	DD National
1987	Manoranjan		
1989	Circus	Chintamani	DD National
1993	Naya Nukkad		
1994	Shrimaan Shrimati	Toto, the film director	DD Metro
2009-2010	Bandini	Saurabh Bhai aka Baapuji	Imagine TV
2013	Adaalat	Sishpal Shastri	
2019-2020	Sanjivani	Guddu Mathur	StarPlus

=== Web series ===
Year	Title	Role	Platform	Notes
2021	Sunflower	Mr. Tondon	Zee5	
2023	Farzi		Prime Video	

=== Short films ===
Year	Title	Role	Channel
2018	Purana Pyaar	Pandurang	YouTube
