= Pushpaka Vimana (1987 film) =

1987 film by Singeetham Srinivasa Rao

- Theatrical release poster in Kannada
- Directed by: Singeetham Srinivasa Rao
- Written by: Singeetham Srinivasa Rao
- Produced by: Shringar Nagaraj; Singeetam Srinivasa Rao
- Starring: Kamal Haasan
- Cinematography: B. C. Gowrishankar
- Edited by: D. Vasu
- Music by: L. Vaidyanathan
- Production company: Mandakini Chitra
- Release date: 27 November 1987
- Running time: 131 minutes
- Country: India
- Budget: ₹ 15–35 lakh
- Box office: ₹ 1 crore

Pushpaka Vimana (transl. The Flower Chariot) is a 1987 Indian black comedy "silent" film written and directed by Singeetham Srinivasa Rao, who co-produced it with Shringar Nagaraj. The film, which has no dialogue, stars Kamal Haasan leading an ensemble cast that includes Samir Khakhar, Tinu Anand, K. S. Ramesh, Amala, Farida Jalal, Pratap Potan, Lokanath, P. L. Narayana and Ramya. It revolves around an unemployed graduate who encounters a drunk rich man unconscious and takes over his lifestyle after keeping him prisoner. However, he does not realise the dangers he has brought upon himself because a hired killer believes him to be his target.

Srinivasa Rao's desire to make a dialogue-less film came when he was working as an assistant director in a film where a character had to emote fear without dialogue in a scene. Once the idea for Pushpaka Vimana materialised, Srinivasa Rao wrote the screenplay within two weeks. The film was the only one produced by Nagaraj. Due to the lack of dialogue, Srinivasa Rao was able to cast actors from different parts of India. The cinematography was handled by B. C. Gowrishankar, editing by D. Vasu, art direction by Thota Tharani, and the background score was composed by L. Vaidyanathan. The film was shot in Bengaluru, Karnataka.

The film was released on 27 November 1987 with different titles for different linguistic regions: its original title Pushpaka Vimana in Karnataka (Kannada), Pushpaka Vimanam in Andhra Pradesh (Telugu), Pushpak (transl. Flower) in Hindi-speaking regions, Pesum Padam (transl. Talking Picture) in Tamil Nadu (Tamil), and Pushpakvimanam in Kerala (Malayalam). It received critical acclaim and became a commercial success, with a 35-week theatrical run in Bengaluru. The film won the National Film Award for Best Popular Film Providing Wholesome Entertainment as a Kannada entry and in three categories at the 35th Filmfare Awards South in the Kannada branch: Best Film, Best Director (Srinivasa Rao) and Best Actor (Haasan).

== Plot ==
An unemployed graduate living in the ramshackle Anand Bhavan dreams of wealth. While trying to impress a roadside beggar with his meagre money, he is humbled to learn that the beggar has accumulated more. Window shopping leads him to an emporium, where he advises a young woman on earrings. He later encounters her while queuing for job vacancies; she mistakes the expensive car he is leaning against for his, and he allows her to believe it. He is pleased to see her wearing the earrings he recommended.

One night, the graduate finds a wealthy man unconscious by the roadside. Discovering a key to a suite at the luxurious "Pushpak" hotel in the man's pocket, he kidnaps and imprisons him at Anand Bhavan, then assumes his identity and lifestyle at Pushpak.

The rich man's wife is having an extramarital affair with his friend, who secretly hires a contract killer to murder him. Given only money and the suite number, the killer mistakes the graduate for his target. Meanwhile, the graduate discovers the young woman staying in the suite opposite his balcony. She is the daughter of a magician performing at the hotel. After she slaps him, mistakenly believing he has played a prank on her, they reconcile when she learns that a boy was responsible. They later grow closer while paying tribute at the hotel owner's funeral and begin a romantic relationship.

The killer repeatedly attempts to murder the graduate with ice daggers, but fails, while the graduate remains unaware of the danger. Eventually, he realises that the killer is at the hotel to murder someone. The killer enters his suite and nearly dies of electrocution while attempting to stab him. The graduate leaves the unconscious killer in his suite. After recovering, the killer goes to the rich man's wife's lover to report his failure; the graduate follows and discovers the truth. The wife, learning of her lover's betrayal, leaves him.

A montage about the hotel owner reveals that he was once poor like the graduate but built his fortune honestly. The graduate begins to regret his deception. After seeing the roadside beggar's corpse abandoned by municipality workers who discover and fight over his money, he resolves to change. He frees the rich man and explains everything in a letter. The man reunites with his wife and gives up drinking.

The graduate then confesses the truth to the magician's daughter in a letter. Although her family is leaving Pushpak, she forgives him. As she departs, she indicates through signs that her home is far away, writes something on paper, and drops a rose wrapped in it from her car window. The graduate retrieves the rose, but the wind blows the paper into a gutter. Later, he is once again shown queuing for job vacancies.

== Cast ==
- Kamal Haasan as the unemployed graduate
- Samir Khakhar as the rich man
- Tinu Anand as the killer
- K. S. Ramesh as the magician
- Amala as the magician's daughter
- Farida Jalal as the magician's wife
- Pratap Potan as the lover
- Lokanath as the hotel owner
- P. L. Narayana as the beggar
- Ramya as the rich man's wife

== Production ==
=== Development ===
Singeetham Srinivasa Rao was assisting director K. V. Reddy in a film where there was a scene requiring a character to emote fear without dialogues. Srinivasa Rao wondered if he could make an entire film that way for a long time, but did not have an idea for the story. The idea for the film that would become Pushpaka Vimana came to Srinivasa Rao when he was in a shower, after which he wrote the screenplay within two weeks. Kamal Haasan agreed to work on the film after being impressed by the script. According to him, the story was originally a tragedy, but after being inspired by Charlie Chaplin, he and Srinivasa Rao decided to change it to a tragicomedy. Pushpaka Vimana thus became the first full-length dialogue-less film in India after the "silent era" of cinema.

The film struggled to find a producer, prompting Srinivasa Rao to take over production himself. When Kannada actor Shringar Nagaraj, a relative of Kannada matinee idol Rajkumar with whom Srinivasa Rao was working at that time, heard that Srinivasa Rao was producing a film on his own, he asked about the subject. Srinivasa Rao narrated Pushpaka Vimana, Nagaraj showed excitement and joined as co-producer, with the film being produced under Mandakani Chitra, a company based in Bengaluru, Karnataka. Pushpaka Vimana was the only film Nagaraj had produced in his entire career. Cinematography was handled by B. C. Gowrishankar, editing by D. Vasu, and art direction by Thota Tharani, who had worked with Srinivasa Rao on Raja Paarvai (1981).

=== Casting ===
Since the film had no dialogue, Srinivasa Rao chose to cast actors from different parts of India. Haasan, a native of Tamil Nadu, was cast as the protagonist, an unemployed graduate. He had to shave his signature moustache for the role. Srinivasa Rao initially wanted Neelam Kothari to be the female lead, but she wanted to wear "glittering costumes" like in Bollywood films; hence, Srinivasa Rao did not cast her. After seeing Amala compere an awards function in Madras, enquiring about her and getting to know about her Kalakshetra background, he approached her and she accepted. Srinivasa Rao decided to cast Samir Khakhar as the drunk rich man, inspired by his drunkard character Khopdi from the Hindi television series Nukkad.

Srinivasa Rao initially approached Amrish Puri to portray the contract killer, but he could not accept the offer due to unavailability of dates. Haasan's then-wife Sarika showed a photograph of Tinu Anand and successfully recommended him for the role. Pratap Potan, then known mainly for portraying dark characters, played a comical character, the illicit lover of Ramya's character. Srinivasa Rao initially wanted Bengali magician P. C. Sorcar Jr. to portray the female lead's magician father, but ultimately chose K. S. Ramesh after seeing his performance in a magic show on television in Bengaluru, where the story is set. Farida Jalal, who was then visiting Bengaluru, was cast as the female lead's mother. According to Srinivasa Rao, P. L. Narayana proved the "ideal choice" for playing the beggar.

=== Filming ===
Thota Tharani constructed a street set for the film beside the Hyland Hotel in Bengaluru. The ramshackle room where the graduate lives, and the building itself, was constructed above the hotel. Most of the shooting was done in the Windsor Manor hotel in Bengaluru. The management of Windsor Manor were not initially willing to let the film be shot there, but after Nagaraj told them that "the entire world will know about this hotel after the film", they agreed. The scenes where the graduate meets the beggar were shot at a bridge near Windsor Manor. According to Anand, Srinivasa Rao wanted the entire cast to be present at all times, regardless of whether they were filming scenes or not.

As Ramesh was not as old as his character, Srinivasa Rao "made him look old". The killer's signature weapon is an ice dagger. For this reason, every night, an ice mould in the shape of a dagger was kept in the freezer; however, the ice dagger would often melt soon by morning because of the strong density lights being used in the shooting. Srinivasa Rao ultimately decided to use an acrylic dagger, which looked like an ice dagger. To capture background and ambient noise accurately, sequences were shot twice.

=== Music ===
The film had no songs, only background score. Srinivasa Rao wanted a composer who could work as per his demands and requirements for the scenes, for this L. Vaidyanathan was chosen to compose the score. Sitar exponent Janardhan Mitta contributed to the re-recording using two other instruments apart from minimal orchestration. L. V. Ganesan also worked on the film's re-recording. Haasan has stated that filmmaker Satyajit Ray was considered to compose the background score, and regretted not approaching him.

== Themes ==
Srinivasa Rao called Pushpaka Vimana a personal film because "that's the life I lead. I don't want to amass wealth. At the same time, I am not a person who romanticises poverty. Money is important, but that is not everything." Anjana Shekar of The News Minute said the film satirises unemployment, an issue that was prevalent in India in the 1980s. She compared it to Mark Twain's novel The Prince and the Pauper because of the concept of identity switching, with the difference being that in Pushpaka Vimana the switching is not mutually agreed upon and the two men do not look alike. Anjana said that the climax in which the graduate is shown standing in a long queue of job seekers indicates that nothing has changed for him "except that now, he's willing to take the metaphorical stairs to succeed in life." Historian Bhagwan Das Garga noted similarities between the graduate and Walter Mitty, because of how the former "fantasises about riches". Srinivasa Rao named The Inspector General (1949), where a civil servant is mistaken for a high-ranking inspector, as an inspiration on Pushpaka Vimana, and also took inspiration from his personal experiences in the 1950s.

Writing for India Today, Madhu Jain described Pushpaka Vimana as "the story of the modern Indian male Cinderella. But with a different end – and moral: Money is not everything though pursuing it is entertaining." She noted the contrast in the name of the graduate's lodge, Anand Bhavan (Abode of Bliss). Film critic Naman Ramachandran said the film gives the message that "money is the root of much evil and honesty is the best policy". Ravi Balakrishnan of The Economic Times said that though it eschews formulaic Indian cinema conventions like songs and dialogue, it has "all the elements that make a great mainstream entertainer – a love story, a crime caper, a thriller and a comedy – with plotlines blending together seamlessly", while comparing its primary narrative to Charlie Chaplin's City Lights (1931), and the graduate to Chaplin's character The Tramp.

== Release ==
Pushpaka Vimana was released on 27 November 1987. The film was released under different titles for different linguistic regions: its original title Pushpaka Vimana in Karnataka (in the Kannada language), Pushpaka Vimanam in Andhra Pradesh (Telugu), Pushpak (transl. Flower) in Hindi-speaking regions, Pesum Padam (transl. Talking Picture) in Tamil Nadu (Tamil), and Pushpakvimanam in Kerala (Malayalam). In Andhra Pradesh, it was distributed by Sravanthi Ravi Kishore, in Mumbai by actor Rajendra Kumar, and in Madras by Editor Mohan. The film was featured in the Indian Panorama section at the 12th International Film Festival of India. Retrospectively it was featured in the Shanghai International Film Festival, and Whistling Woods Film Festival.

=== Reception ===
The film received critical acclaim for its creativity, making and the cast performances. Reviewing Pesum Padam, the magazine Ananda Vikatan said that to make a silent film needs a lot of courage and the filmmaker needs to be congratulated for that, rating it 50 out of 100. N. Krishnaswamy of The Indian Express said, "For [Kamal Haasan], the film is yet another achievement. For Singeetam, always the bold experimenter [...] Pesum Padam should provide both critical and commercial mileage. It is music director L. Vaidyanathan's task to provide the 'silent' film a worthy musical foil to match its varied moods and needs: this he does with panache." Jayamanmadhan of the magazine Kalki appreciated virtually every aspect of the film, calling it a must watch.

Satyajit Ray applauded the film and told Srinivasa Rao, "You have created a love scene around a dead body", referring to the scene where the graduate and the magician's daughter walk around the hotel owner's dead body during his funeral several times just to spend some time together. Bombay: The City Magazine's critic wrote, "Pushpak is a bold and timely reminder that verbal diarrhoea drowns out meaning. Silence is not only golden but eloquent." Though no-one expected the film to succeed, it was a sleeper hit, completing a 35-week theatrical run in Bengaluru, and grossing around ₹1 crore according to estimates by Madhu Jain and Garga.

== Accolades ==
Event	Award	Recipient(s)	Ref.
35th National Film Awards	Best Popular Film Providing Wholesome Entertainment	Singeetham Srinivasa Rao and Shringar Nagaraj	
35th Filmfare Awards South	Best Film – Kannada	Shringar Nagaraj	
35th Filmfare Awards South	Best Director – Kannada	Singeetham Srinivasa Rao	
35th Filmfare Awards South	Best Actor – Kannada	Kamal Haasan	
1987–88 Karnataka State Film Awards	Best Editor	D. Vasu	
1987–88 Karnataka State Film Awards	Best Music Director	L. Vaidyanathan	
1987–88 Karnataka State Film Awards	Karnataka State Jury's Special Award	Singeetham Srinivasa Rao	

== Legacy ==
Pushpaka Vimana became a landmark of Indian cinema. According to film theorists Ashish Rajadhyaksha and Paul Willemen, it "opened up a new dimension in art-house entertainment", and "helped change [Kamal Haasan's] screen image". Srinivasa Rao has stated that after the film's success, many people wanted him to make more dialogue-less films, but he was uninterested. Amala listed it along with Vedham Pudhithu (1987), Agni Natchathiram (1988), Siva (1989) and Karpoora Mullai (1991) as her most memorable films. The film is listed among News18's "hundred greatest Indian films of all time". It was also listed by Rediff.com in its list "Singeetham's gems before Christ". On Haasan's birthday, 7 November 2015, Latha Srinivasan of Daily News and Analysis considered Pushpaka Vimanam to be one of the "films you must watch to grasp the breadth of Kamal Haasan's repertoire".

== Bibliography ==
- Garga, Bhagwan Das (1996). So many cinemas: the motion picture in India. Mumbai: Eminence Designs. ISBN 9788190060219. OCLC 645262299.
- Ghose, Vijaya, ed. (2003). Limca Book of Records. Gurgaon: Bisleri Beverages Limited. ISBN 9788190114868. OCLC 449524954.
- Puri, Amrish; Sabharwal, Jyoti (2006). The Act of Life. Stellar Publishers. ISBN 9788190224741. OCLC 608443071.
- Rajadhyaksha, Ashish; Willemen, Paul (1998) [1994]. Encyclopaedia of Indian Cinema. British Film Institute and Oxford University Press. ISBN 0-19-563579-5.
