= 5th Filmfare Awards =

1958 awards for Hindi cinema

- Date: 1958
- Site: Bombay

Highlights
- Best Film: Mother India
- Best Actor: Dilip Kumar for Naya Daur
- Best Actress: Nargis for Mother India
- Most awards: Mother India (5)
- Most nominations: Mother India (5)

The 5th Filmfare Awards were held in 1958.

Mother India led this edition of the awards with 5 nominations, followed by Naya Daur with 4 nominations and Sharada with 3 nominations.

Mother India won 5 awards, including Best Film, Best Director (for Mehboob Khan) and Best Actress (for Nargis), thus becoming the most-awarded film at the ceremony.

== Main awards ==
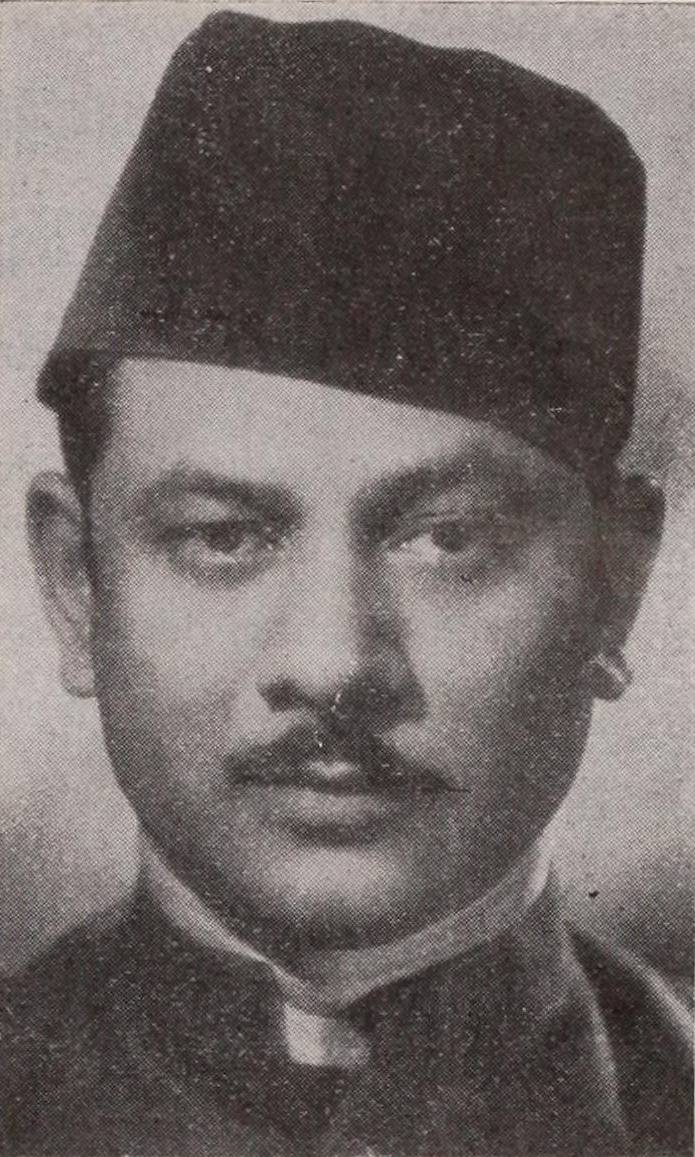
Mehboob Khan, Best Director

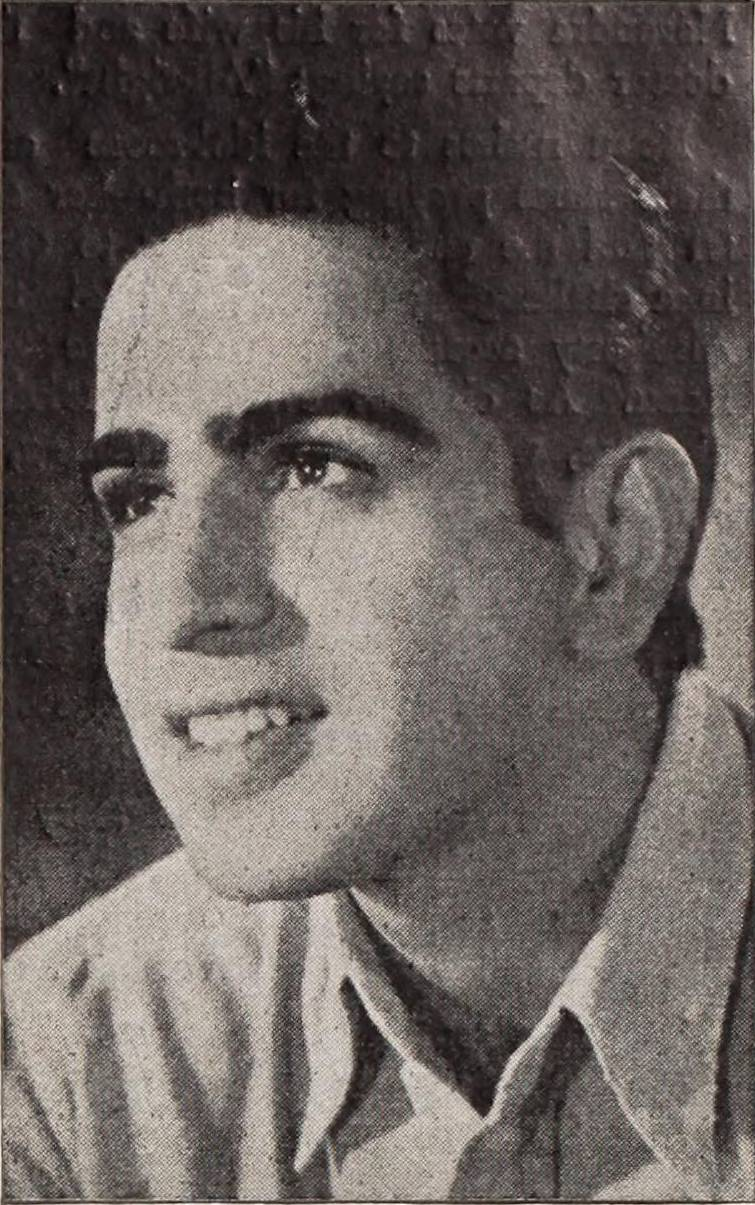
Dilip Kumar, Best Actor

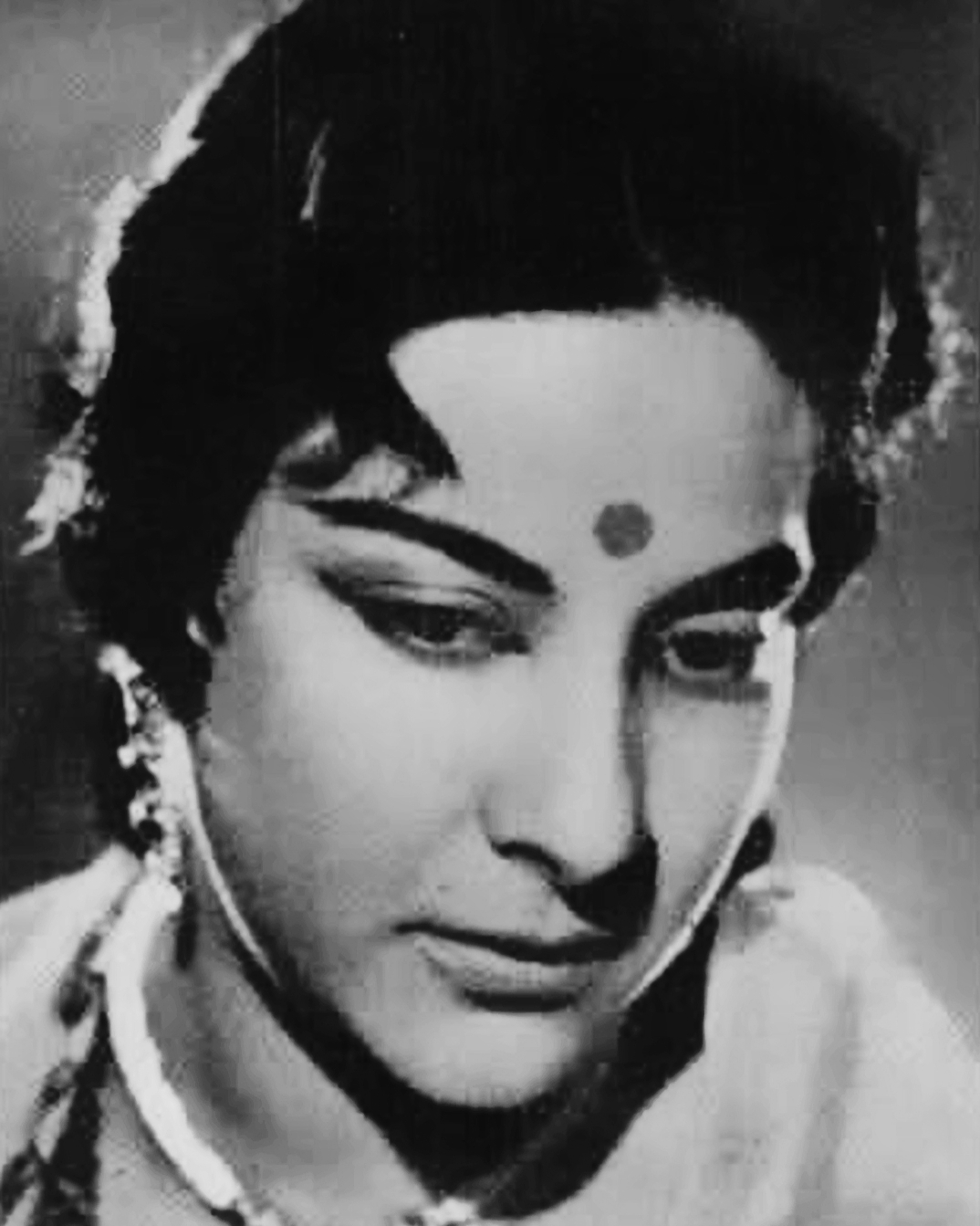
Nargis Dutt, Best Actress

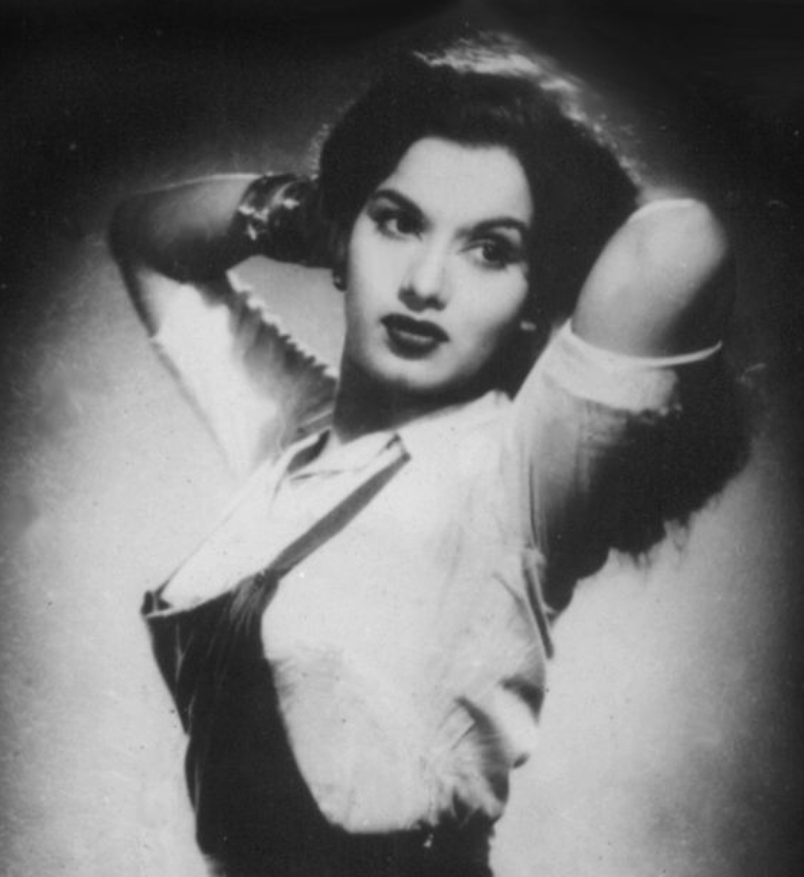
Shyama, Best Supporting Actress

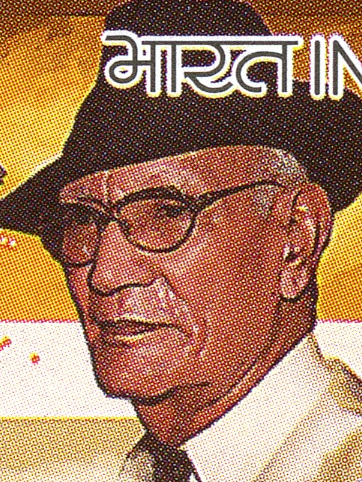
O. P. Nayyar, Best Music Director

| Best Film | Best Director |
|---|---|
| Mother India – Mehboob Productions | Mehboob Khan – Mother India |
| Best Actor | Best Actress |
| Dilip Kumar – Naya Daur as Shankar | Nargis – Mother India as Radha |
| Best Supporting Actor | Best Supporting Actress |
| Raj Mehra – Sharada as Kashiram; Ajit – Naya Daur as Krishna | Shyama – Sharada as Chanchal; Nanda – Bhabhi as Lata |
| Best Story | Best Music Director |
| Akhtar Mirza – Naya Daur | O. P. Nayyar – Naya Daur |

== Technical Awards ==
| Best Cinematography | Best Sound Recordist |
|---|---|
| Faredoon A. Irani – Mother India | R. Kaushik – Mother India |
| Best Art Direction | Best Editor |
| M. R. Acharekar – Pardesi | Shivaji Awdhut – Sharada |

== Superlatives ==
The following films had multiple wins and nominations

| Movie | Awards | Nominations |
|---|---|---|
| Mother India | 5 | 5 |
| Naya Daur | 3 | 4 |
| Sharada | 3 | 3 |

== See also ==
- Filmfare Awards
