= Jaswinder Singh (singer) =

Indian ghazal singer

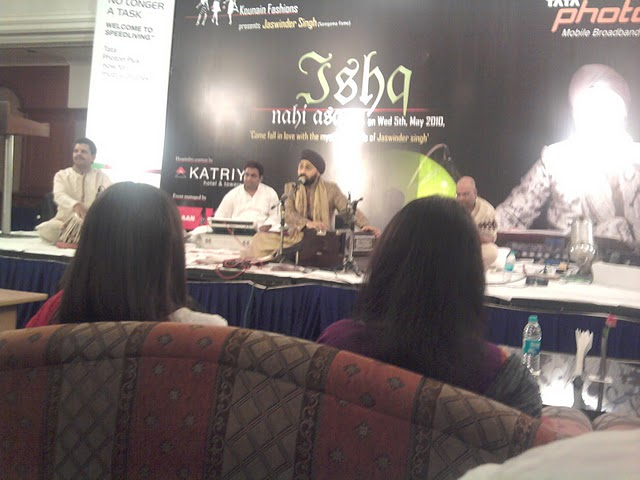
- Singh in Hyderabad, India (May 2010)

Background information
- Origin: Mumbai, India
- Genre: Ghazals
- Occupation: Singer
- Years active: 1993–present
- Labels: Tips, Saregama

Jaswinder Singh is an Indian ghazal singer. Saregama, an Indian music archive, released his music album Ishq Nahin Asaan. Earlier, he released "Yours Truly" and "Dilkash" by Tips Music.

Jaswinder Singh has played concerts in USA, Canada, UK, Australia, Malaysia, Singapore, Dubai and Muscat. He has performed over 300 live concerts. Jaswinder Singh specialises in several Sufi and Punjabi songs, usually performed toward the end of his concerts.

== Early life ==
Jaswinder Singh was born in Mumbai. He is the son of Kuldeep Singh, composer of ghazals such as "Tumko dekha to ye khayal aaya" from the movie Saath Saath and "Itni Shakti Hame De Na Daata" from Ankush. He was trained in classical singing by Dr Sushila Pohankar and Pt. Ajay Pohankar, and the ghazal singer Jagjit Singh.

== Career ==
Singh got his training in classical singing from Sushilabai and Ajay Pohankar. He was chosen to sing for the play Kaifi Aur Main, an epistolary-style play dealing with the life and times of the lyricist and poet Kaifi Azmi. The lead actors Javed Akhtar and Shabana Azmi share anecdotes from the poet's life while Singh performs ghazals and songs written by Kaifi Azmi.

He performed in Ghalibnaama, a conceptual show based on the prose and poetry of Mirza Ghalib. In July 2012, Singh sang "Bahut Yaad Aate Ho Tum" for an episode of Aamir Khan's TV series Satyamev Jayate.

== Awards ==
He was awarded ‘The young Ghazal Maestro’ by Indian Music Academy. The title was presented by Hariprasad Chaurasia in the presence of A. P. J. Abdul Kalam.

Year	Category	Nominated Song	Film	Result	Ref(s)
Mirchi Music Awards
2016	Upcoming Male Vocalist of The Year	"Tumhe Bhi Meri Yaad"	30 Minutes	Nominated	

== Recordings ==
- "Ishq nahin aasaan" released by Saregama.
- "Dilkash" released by Tips
- "Yours Truly" released by Tips
- "Eternal" released by Artistaloud / Hungama
