= Akhtar Mirza =

Indian screenwriter

- Occupation: Screenwriter
- Children: Saeed Akhtar Mirza; Aziz Mirza

Akhtar Mirza was an Indian screenwriter and director for Bollywood films. He won the Filmfare Award for Best Story, for the 1965 film Waqt.

He is the father of National Award-winning director Saeed Akhtar Mirza and film-maker Aziz Mirza, who was responsible for launching the career of Shah Rukh Khan.

== Filmography ==
=== As writer ===
- 1989 Salim Langde Pe Mat Ro (script consultant)
- 1973 Joshila (screenplay)
- 1973 Dhund (story & screenplay)
- 1965 Waqt (story / as F.A. Mirza)
- 1965 Mohabbat Isko Kahete Hain (screenplay)
- 1957 Ab Dilli Dur Nahin (screenplay / story)
- 1957 Naya Daur (screenplay/story)
- 1950 Bawre Nain (story)

=== As director ===
- 1965 Mohabbat Isko Kahete Hain
