= Phatichar =

- Written by: Anil Chaudhary
- Directed by: Anil Chaudhary
- Starring: Pankaj Kapur
- Music by: Sharang Dev
- Original language: Hindi
- No. of seasons: 1

Production
- Producer: Indu Prakash
- Cinematography: Sunil Sharma
- Editor: Gajendra Singh

Original release
- Network: DD National
- Release: 1991

Phatichar (translation: poor, wearing tattered clothes) is an Indian television series on Doordarshan in 1991, starring Pankaj Kapur in the title role. His character lived in a cement pipe and the show portrayed, in a bitter-sweet manner, the life of the disadvantaged living on the margins.

This is a black humor telecast as TV series in Doordarshan, written and directed by Anil Chaudhary. Sharang Dev was the music director. The catch phrase of the show was "Arre yaar phatichar, tu itna emotional kyun hain?"

== Plot ==
Writer Ajit Vachhani (Character has the same name of the actor) gets a project from the renowned publisher Paul to write his biography. But before he could finish the writing the character runs away from the unfinished novel. The character got the name "Phatichar" given by a bell boy in a hotel. By accident Phatichar gets involved with a poor family of a blind sister, a dwarf brother and their drunkard uncle. He started living in a water pipe of municipality. While living with this family he becomes familiar with harsh reality of the common man's life. He becomes concerned and worried about this despondency of poor people. He tries to solve these in his candid but comical way.

== Cast and crew ==
=== Cast ===
- Pankaj Kapoor as Phatichar
- Ajit Vachhani as Writer Ajit Vachhani
- Nina Gupta as Sapna
- Avtar Gill as Banke
- Preeti Khare as Mala
- Rajesh Puri as chacha
- Anupam Kher in a cameo role

=== Crew ===
- Writer and Director: Anil Chaudhary
- Cinematographer: Sunil Sharma
- Music Director: Sharang Dev
- Producer: Indu Prakash
- Editor: Gajendra Singh
