= Ammi: Letter to a Democratic Mother =

Novel by Saeed Akhtar Mirza

- Author: Saeed Akhtar Mirza
- Genre: Epistolary
- Publication date: 2008
- Publication place: India

Ammi: Letter to a Democratic Mother is 2008 a debut novel by Indian director and script writer Saeed Akhtar Mirza. It takes the form of a letter written by Mirza to his late mother.
