= The Monk, the Moor & Moses Ben Jalloun =

2012 novel by Saeed Akhtar Mirza

The Monk, the Moor and Moses Ben Jalloun
- First edition
- Author: Saeed Akhtar Mirza
- Language: English
- Genre: Literary Fiction
- Publisher: Fourth Estate
- Publication date: 2012
- Publication place: India
- Pages: 247
- ISBN: 978-93-5029-206-8

The Monk, the Moor and Moses Ben Jalloun is a 2012 novel by Saeed Akhtar Mirza. The book was published by HarperCollins, and follows four students as they discover themselves by learning about the past.

== Plot ==
The novel centers on four students attending an American university and studying history. The book particularly focuses on the tale of the eleventh century Iranian Rehana, a woman with a zest for learning. As the students study the past, they begin to learn more about themselves and how actions in the past can affect them in the present and future.

== Reception ==
Critical reception for the book was positive, with the Deccan Chronicle calling it a "lovely work". The Hindu mostly praised the novel, but stated that an index or a bibliography would have been useful. IBN Live also gave a positive review, calling it "a great addition to any bookcase".
