= Joshila =

- Hindi-language Film poster
- Directed by: Yash Chopra
- Written by: Akhtar ul-Iman; Akhtar Mirza; Gulshan Nanda; C. J. Pavri
- Produced by: Gulshan Rai
- Starring: Dev Anand; Hema Malini; Pran; Bindu; Raakhee
- Cinematography: Fali Mistry
- Edited by: Pran Mehra
- Music by: R. D. Burman
- Production companies: Chandivali Studio; Filmistan Studios; Rajkamal Studios
- Distributed by: Trimurti Films
- Release date: 19 October 1973
- Country: India
- Language: Hindi

Joshila (English: Spirited) is a 1973 Hindi-language action thriller film directed by Yash Chopra. The film stars Dev Anand, Hema Malini and Raakhee. Most outdoor parts of the movie were shot in Darjeeling, West Bengal. The film is loosely inspired by James Hadley Chase's 1959 novel, Shock Treatment.

== Cast ==
- Dev Anand - Amar / Madanlal Dogra (Fake)
- Hema Malini - Shalini
- Raakhee - Sapna
- Pran - Thakur Rajpal Singh
- Bindu - Rani
- Madan Puri - Madanlal Dogra
- Manmohan Krishna - Jailor
- Padma Khanna - Manju
- A. K. Hangal - Lala Gulzarilal
- Sulochana Latkar - Mrs. Gulzarilal
- Sudhir - Kundan
- Hercules - Sher Singh
- Master Satyajeet - Ravi
- I. S. Johar - Raunaq Singh
- Vikas Anand - Manohar
- Roopesh Kumar - Dinesh (Sapna's Brother)
- Iftekhar - Inspector Manjit
- Jagdish Raj - (as Jagdishraj)
- Mahendra Sandhu
- Uma Dutt - Solicitor

== Plot ==
Jailor Manmohan Krishan is responsible for looking after convicts undergoing sentences of rigorous imprisonment. His daughter's friend a young, beautiful and captivating hema malini named Shalini is visiting and staying in the jailors home which is located in the jail complex.Shalini is a poet, one day while reciting her poetry, she meets with a young man, who introduces himself as Amar, who also happens to be a poet himself. The two of them spend beautiful moments together and finds themselves attracted to each other. Shalini wants to find out why Amar is in jail. She is told in no uncertain terms that Amar is in jail for murder - for killing the brother of his former lover, Sapna. She also found out that this is not true and would strive to the best of her merit to get Amar release from jail because she is in love with him and would like to marry him. Later after his release he found his mother in a very poor condition, he also found his sister as a dancer in a nightclub, where Madanlal Dogra an old friend from his prisoners day came to him, and assured to help him. Later Madanlal murdered by some of his rivals. Amar decided to go for the job as Madanlal Dogra, where he finds Shalini in Darjeeling Station. Amar joined as an estate manager in Thakur Rajpal Singh's estate. In some days he realised that Thakur's wife was intended to kill her husband. Shalini later came as Thakur Rajpal Singh's daughter. After police vigorously search for the murderer of Dogra they found the name of Amer. Knowing the truth Amer's mother rush for Darjeeling, where she was kidnapped by Kundan with her family. At last Amer saves Thakur Rajpal Singh and his family after a fight, married Shalini and they started to live in Darjeeling, with his family.

== Crew ==
- Director - Yash Chopra
- Story - Gulshan Nanda
- Screenplay - Akhtar Mirza, C. J. Pavri
- Dialogue - Akhtar-Ul-Iman
- Producer - Gulshan Rai
- Editor - Pran Mehra
- Cinematographer - Fali Mistry
- Art Director - R. G. Gaekwad
- Assistant Director - Ramesh Talwar (chief), Vasudev Dheer, Dilip Naik
- Assistant Editor - T. R. Mangeshkar (chief), Achyut Y. Gupte (color consultant)
- Assistant Art Director - Sudhir Gaekwad
- Stunts - Ravi Khanna, M. B. Shetty
- Makeup - Pandhari Juker
- Production Manager - R. L. Bajaj, Devdutt Bharti
- Costume and Wardrobe - Meeta Hassan, Wilmary Ventura, Suresh Bhatt, P. L. Raj
- Original Music - R. D. Burman
- Music Assistant - Manohari Singh
- Lyricist - Sahir Ludhianvi
- Playback Singers - Asha Bhosle, Kishore Kumar, Lata Mangeshkar

== Music ==
All songs written by Sahir Ludhianvi and composed by Rahul Dev Burman.

Song	Singer
"Kiska Rasta Dekhe"	Kishore Kumar
"Kuch Bhi Kar Lo, Ek Din Tumko Meri Hona Hoga"	Kishore Kumar, Lata Mangeshkar
"Dil Mein Jo Baatein Hain, Aaj Chalo Hum Kehde"	Kishore Kumar, Asha Bhosle
"Jo Baat Ishaaron Mein Kahi"	Lata Mangeshkar
"Mehfil Mein Chhupaane Pade"	Lata Mangeshkar
"Sharma Na Yun"	Asha Bhosle
"Kaanp Rahi Main"	Asha Bhosle
"Sona Rupa Laayo Re"	Asha Bhosle
