= Mahayagya =

Mahayagya (transl. Major sacrifice or a ritual) is an Indian television show broadcast on Sony TV in 1997–1998. Written, produced and directed by Anil Chaudhary, the political drama starred Manohar Singh, Rohini Hattangadi, Goving Namdeo, supported by Ananya Khare, Murali Sharma, Kumud Mishra and others.

== Premise ==
Set in the small central-Indian town, the story unfolds with an average, politically inexperienced but practical and shrewd woman, Vimla Pandey (Rohini Hattangadi) winning the Parliamentary election, defeating seasoned politician Thakur Bhanu Pratap Singh (Manohar Singh). Vimla Pandey is on the warpath to settle old dues with the Thakur.

== Cast ==
- Manohar Singh as Thakur Bhanu Pratap Singh
- Govind Namdeo as Chhote Thakur
- Rohini Hattangadi as Vimla Pandey
- Ananya Khare (credited as Preeti Khare)
- Murali Sharma
- Kumud Mishra
- Kanika Shivpuri as Chief Minister
