= National Film Award for Best Film on Family Welfare =

Indian film award

- National award for contributions to Indian Cinema
- Sponsored by: Directorate of Film Festivals
- Rewards: Rajat Kamal (Silver Lotus); ₹50,000
- First award: 1968
- Final award: 2008
- Most recent winner: Little Zizou

Highlights
- Total awarded: 21
- First winner: Anchal Ke Phool
- Last winner: Little Zizou

The National Film Award for Best Film on Family Welfare was one of the National Film Awards presented annually by the Directorate of Film Festivals, the organisation set up by Ministry of Information and Broadcasting, India. It was one of several awards presented for feature films and awarded with Rajat Kamal (Silver Lotus). At the 70th National Film Awards, the category was discontinued and combined with Best Film on Environment Conservation/Preservation, Best Film on National Integration and Best Film on Other Social Issues. The new award is named as Best Feature Film Promoting National, Social and Environmental Values.

The award was instituted in 1968, at 16th National Film Awards and awarded annually for films produced in the year across the country, in all Indian languages Hindi (7 Awards), Bengali (4 Awards), Malayalam (5 awards), Tamil (3 awards), Kannada, English and Gujarati (1 each).

== Winners ==
Indicates a joint award for that year

Award includes 'Rajat Kamal' (Silver Lotus) and cash prize. Following are the award winners over the years:

List of films, showing the year (award ceremony), language(s), producer(s) and director(s)
Year	Film(s)	Language(s)	Producer(s)	Director(s)	Refs.
1968 (16th)	Anchal Ke Phool	Hindi	M. R. Seth	Karunesh Thakur	
1969 (17th)	No Award				
1970 (18th)	No Award				
1971 (19th)					
1972 (20th)	No Award				
1973 (21st)	No Award				
1974 (22nd)	No Award				
1975 (23rd)	No Award				
1976 (24th)					
1977 (25th)	No Award				
1978 (26th)	No Award				
1979 (27th)					
1980 (28th)	No Award				
1981 (29th)	No Award				
1982 (30th)	Spandan	Hindi	• Satyanarayanan Misra • Abdul Majid • Durga Nanda	Biplab Roy Chowdhary	
1983 (31st)	No Award				
1984 (32nd)	Mohan Joshi Hazir Ho!	Hindi	Saeed Akhtar Mirza	Saeed Akhtar Mirza	
1985 (33rd)	No Award				
1986 (34th)	No Award				
1987 (35th)	No Award				
1988 (36th)	No Award				
1989 (37th)	Sandhya Raagam	Tamil	Balu Mahendra (A Doordarshan production)	Balu Mahendra	
1990 (38th)	No Award				
1991 (39th)	Durga	Hindi	NFDC	Basu Chatterjee	
1992 (40th)	Shwet Paatharer Thala	Bengali	Shankar Gope	Prabhat Roy	
1993 (41st)	Akashadoothu	Malayalam	Anupama Cinema	Siby Malayil	
1994 (42nd)	Karuththamma	Tamil	Vetrivel Art Creations	Bharathiraja	
1995 (43rd)	Mini	Malayalam	Madhu	P. Chandrakumar	
1996 (44th)	Lathi	Bengali	Robin Agarwal	Prabhat Roy	
1997 (45th)	Samaantharangal	Malayalam	Balachandra Menon	Balachandra Menon	
1998 (46th)	Atmiyo Swajan	Bengali	Dhatri Films	Raja Sen	
1999 (47th)	Hari-Bhari	Hindi	Government of India	Shyam Benegal	
2000 (48th)	Kal Kaa Aadmi	Hindi	Ministry of Health and Family Welfare	Amol Palekar	
2001 (49th)	No Award				
2002 (50th)	No Award				
2003 (51st)	Paadam Onnu: Oru Vilapam	Malayalam	Aryadan Shaukat	T. V. Chandran	
2004 (52nd)	Hasina	Kannada	Chiguru Chitra	Girish Kasaravalli	
2005 (53rd)	Thavamai Thavamirundhu	Tamil	P. Shanmugam	Cheran	
2006 (54th)	Karutha Pakshikal	Malayalam	• Kaladharan K. V. • Vallabhan K. G.	Kamal	
2006 (54th)	Faltu	Bengali	Arindam Chaudhuri	Anjan Das	
2007 (55th)	Taare Zameen Par	Hindi	Aamir Khan	Aamir Khan	
2008 (56th)	Little Zizou	• English • Gujarati	Jigri Dost Productions	Sooni Taraporevala	
