= Main Maa Punjab Dee =

Main Maa Punjab Dee is a 1998 Punjabi-language Indian film, written and directed by Balwant Dullat. The film starred Dara Singh, Manjeet Kullar, Bhagwant Mann, Deepak Saraf, Neeru Singh, Shavinder Mahal and Ravinder Mann. The music was by Kuldeep Singh. The film was critically acclaimed and received the National Film Award for Best Punjabi Feature Film. Manjeet Kullar considered her work in the film, "one of my best performances."

The film is an "exploration of a suffering mother who undergoes the trauma created by her own sons and discovers her creative talent and rehabilitates herself."
