= Kuldeep Singh (music director) =

Indian music director and theatre composer

Kuldeep Singh (also credited as Kuldip Singh)(born 1942) is an Indian music director and theatre composer. He is known for his work in Hindi theatre and films, including the film Saath Saath (1982), for which he composed the ghazal "Tumko Dekha To Ye Khayal Aaya", Ankush (1986), which included the prayer song "Itni Shakti Hamein Dena Daata" and National Film Award winner Main Maa Punjab Dee, directed by Balwant Dullat.

He has been associated with the Indian People's Theatre Association (IPTA), Mumbai Chapter for nearly 40 years and has composed music for numerous stage productions. He has composed for popular acts like Aakhiri Shama, Kaifi Aur Main, Girija Ke Sapne which are regularly featured in Mumbai and other parts of the country.

He received the Sangeet Natak Akademi Award for music for theatre in 2009 and the National Lata Mangeshkar Samman for 2018.

== Early life and training ==
Born as Kuldeep Singh Vig in Hasan Abdal, now in Pakistan, he began learning music at a young age from S. Joginder Singh Jogi of the Sham Chaurasia gharana under Lakshman Prasad Jaipurwale. Singh obtained a master's degree in psychology from the University of Bombay.

Ghazal singer Jasvinder Singh is his son.

== Career ==
Singh joined the Indian People's Theatre Association in Mumbai and apart from IPTA productions, he composed music for theatre productions for the next four decades. This includes for Mumbai theatre groups including Ekjute and Ank, and plays such as Bakri, Lok Katha, Moteram ka Satyagraha, Girija ke Sapne, Pencil Se Brush Tak, Azdak ka Insaf, Suman Aur Sana, Jis Lahore Nahin Dekhya, Agar Aur Magar, Ghalibnama, Kaifi Aur Main and M. S. Sathyu's IPTA production Girija Ke Sapne.. Besides this, he also composed music for television serials and films.

== Discography ==
=== Music director ===
- Saath Saath (1982)
- Ankush (1986)
- Nukkad (1986, TV Series)
- Circus (TV series, 1989)
- Doorie (1989)
- Train to Pakistan (1998)
- Main Maa Punjab Dee (1998)

== Awards ==
- He received the Sangeet Natak Akademi Award in 2009 for Music for Theatre in the Allied Theatre Arts category.
- In 2020, the government of Madhya Pradesh awarded him Lata Mangeshkar Award in recognition of his contribution to music.
