= Anil Chaudhary (filmmaker) =

Indian director, producer and screenwriter

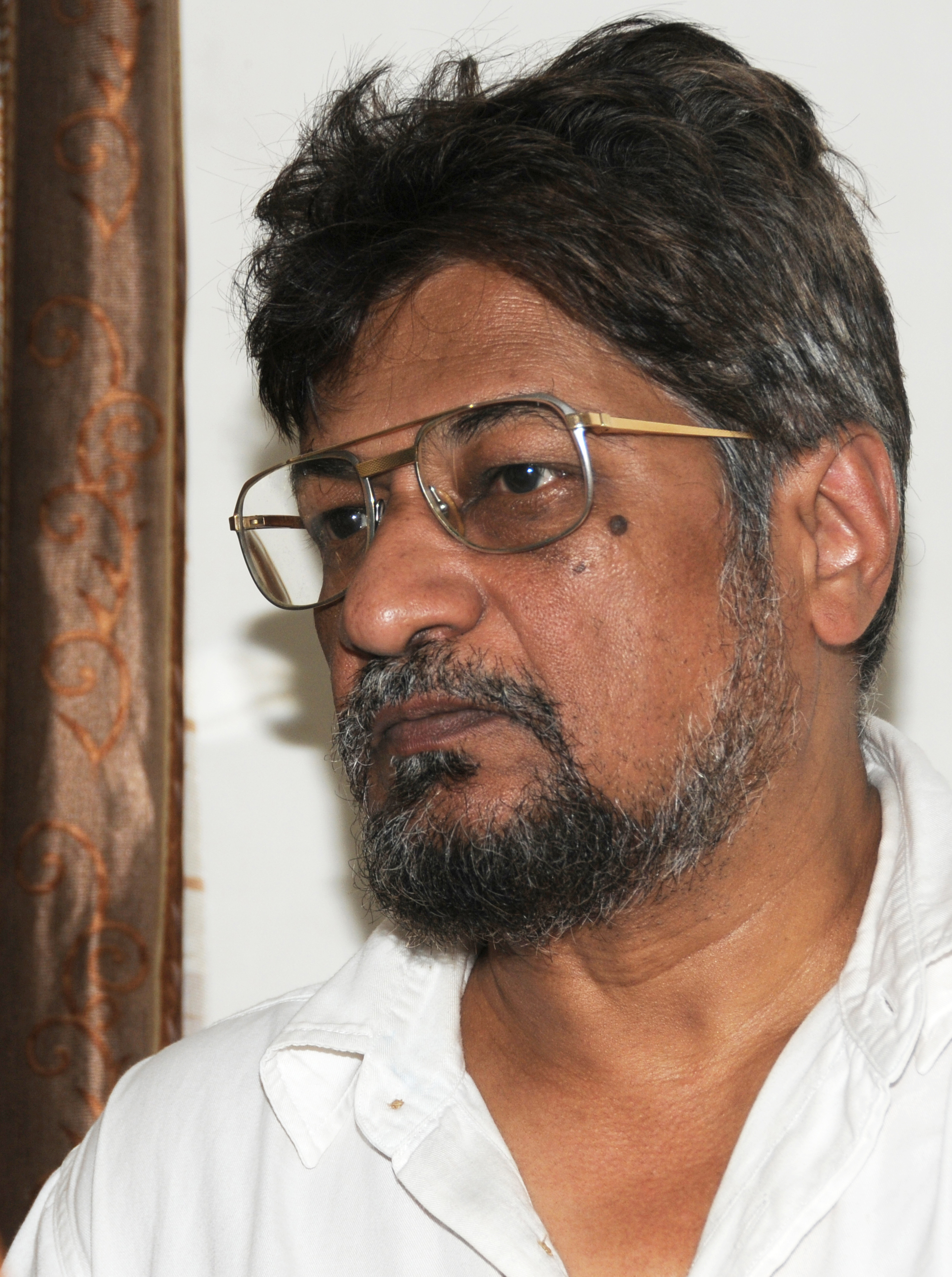
- Born: 1950; Dholpur, Rajasthan
- Occupations: Writer & Director
- Notable work: Kabeer, Mahayagya, Phatichar, Karamchand, Nukkad, Rajani
- Spouse: Atiya Chaudhary

Anil Chaudhary is an Indian director, producer and screenwriter. He is the maker of notable television shows such as Mahayagya (1997), Phatichar (1991), Kabeer (1986) and Gunwale Dulhania Le Jayenge (2009). He is credited with writing television shows such as Karamchand, Nukkad and Rajani. He also authored and directed numerous theatre plays one of which is 'Chopra Kamaal Naukar Jamal' that was adapted from Bertolt Brecht's play 'Mr. Puntila and his man Matti'.

== Personal life ==
Anil was born in 1950 in Dholpur, Rajasthan. After studying at Kishori Raman (P.G.) college in Mathura, Uttar Pradesh he moved to Delhi and attended the National School of Drama where he obtained a diploma in direction.

== Career ==
=== Films ===
Credited as the dialogue writer

- Amar Jyoti
- Rao Saheb
- Kabootar
- Lanka

=== TV serials ===
Title	Producer	Director	Writer	Ref.
Kabeer	Yes	Yes	Yes	
Mahayagya	Yes	Yes	Yes	
Gunwale Dulhania Le Jayenge		Yes	Yes	
Sab Chalta Hai - Take It Easy	Yes	Yes	Yes	
Kaal Kothri	Yes	Yes	Yes	
Nehru Ne Kaha Tha	Yes	Yes	Yes	
Chala Banuya Roadpati	Yes	Yes	Yes	
Phatichar		Yes	Yes	
Awaz - Dil Se Dil Tak		Yes	Yes	
Karamchand			Yes	
Rajani			Yes	
Yeh Jo Hai Zindagi			Yes	
Philips Top 10			Yes	
Nukkad			Yes	

=== Game shows ===
As writer

- Sawaal Dus Crore Ka

=== Theatre plays ===
- Chopra Kamaal Naukar Jamal
- Uddhwast Dharmashala
- Andhere Mein
- Nishachar
- Rustam Sohrab
- Nautanki – Laila Majnoo
- Inna
- Bakari
- Kaua Chala Hans Ki Chaal
