= Salim Langde Pe Mat Ro =

1989 film by Saeed Akhtar Mirza

- Poster
- Directed by: Saeed Akhtar Mirza
- Written by: Saeed Akhtar Mirza; Hriday Lani (dialogue)
- Produced by: NFDC
- Starring: Pavan Malhotra; Makrand Deshpande; Ashutosh Gowariker
- Cinematography: Virendra Saini
- Edited by: Javed Sayyed
- Music by: Sharang Dev
- Release date: 29 May 1989
- Running time: 120 minutes
- Country: India
- Language: Hindi

Salim Langde Pe Mat Ro (transl. Don't Cry for Salim, the Lame) is a 1989 Indian film directed by Saeed Akhtar Mirza, with Pavan Malhotra as lead. The film won Best Feature Film in Hindi and Best Cinematography at 37th National Film Awards.

== Plot ==
The film is set in the period of the 1980s. The story revolves around Salim Pasha, a man with a physical disability. He is involved in crimes like extortion and robbery with two of his friends Peera and Abdul. Salim is a carefree man. He lives with his parents and his younger sister. Salim's younger brother Javed Pasha (who has been a hard-working student all his life) dies because of an electric shock. His parents are keen to get his younger sister married to a proofreader of an Urdu newspaper named Aslam.

After watching a documentary film made on the communal riots of Bhiwandi, Salim is shaken from within. He wants to give up everything he does and start life afresh. Salim tries to look for a job and ends up with a job at a garage with the help of a restaurant owner. Salim happily goes to Aslam to tell about the way he would start up his new life. Salim is asked to stir up a riot for a huge sum of money. He refuses to do so and tells them how he is devastated since he has seen the outcome of Bhiwandi communal riots. On the day of his younger sister's engagement with Aslam, Salim is seen happily dancing with his friends. During the celebrations of his sister's engagement ceremony, he is killed by one of his rivals.

== Cast ==
- Pavan Malhotra as Salim, the Lame (Langda)
- Makrand Deshpande as Peera
- Ashutosh Gowariker as Abdul
- Rajendra Gupta as Aslam
- Neelima Azeem as Mumtaz
- Vikram Gokhale as Salim's father
- Surekha Sikri as Amina, Salim's mother
- Nishigandha Wad as Anees, Salim's Sister
- Haidar Ali as Nathu Seth
- Shakti Singh as Rajan
- Tom Alter as Johan
- Ajit Vachani as Rafiq bhai
- Neeraj Vora as Churan miya
- Naresh Suri as police inspector
- Achyut Potdar as Lala
- Ashok Banthia as Vilas Nakkashe

== Awards ==
- National Film Awards–1989
  - National Film Award for Best Feature Film in Hindi
  - National Film Award for Best Cinematography: Virendra Saini
- 1989

Tokyo International Film Festival
