= Shringar Nagaraj =

Indian film actor (1939–2013)

- Born: 16 July 1939; Bangalore, Karnataka, British Raj
- Died: 16 July 2013 (aged 74)
- Other name: Shringar Nagaraj
- Occupations: Actor; producer
- Children: 4, including Ramkumar
- Relatives: Rajkumar family

Gangolli Ramashet Nagaraj (16 July 1939 – 16 July 2013), popularly known as Shringar Nagaraj, was an Indian actor, cameraman, and producer in Kannada cinema. He is best known for the 1987 silent film Pushpaka Vimana, which won the National Film Award for Best Popular Film Providing Wholesome Entertainment.

He was bestowed with Kannada Rajyotsava, Filmfare Awards, International Houston Film Festival Award and a few others.

== Early life and education ==
Born in Bangalore on 16 July 1939, he graduated with a Bachelor of Commerce from MES College in Malleswaram and a Bachelor of Laws from the Government Law College in the 1960s.

== Career ==
Nagaraj renounced his traditional gold jewellery profession with the imposition of the Gold Control Act and took up photography. His creative talent made him a well-known photographer in Bangalore. He was popular amongst celebrities in the film industry as a photographer as well as a cameraman, which led him to take up acting in movies.

He got his first break in Kannada films in a supporting role with Rajkumar in Sipayi Ramu (1972). In 1973 he debuted as a hero opposite Kalpana in Kesarina Kamala. He has acted in almost 25 Kannada films such as Bangaradha Manushya, Katha Sangama, Ranganayaki, Haalu Jenu, Chalisuva Modagalu and Shabdavedi.

Nagaraj also owned a travel agency called Shringar Tours. He has travelled all over the world and photographed beautiful scenes in his travels, which will soon be published. His name to fame lies in the fact that he took up the challenge and produced the award-winning Pushpaka Vimana, a silent film, starring Kamal Haasan that won the National Film Award for Best Popular Film Providing Wholesome Entertainment, the President's Gold Medal, and a lot of critical acclaim.

== Personal life ==
He has two sons and two daughters including actor Ramkumar who is also the son-in-law of Rajkumar and Pranam who is blessed with psychic insight abilities.

== Death ==
He died on 16 July 2013.

== Awards ==
- Kannada Rajyotsava in 1999.
- Filmfare Awards in 1989.
- Screen Award.
