= Saath Saath (film) =

- Directed by: Raman Kumar
- Written by: Raman Kumar
- Produced by: Dilip Dhawan
- Starring: Farooq Sheikh; Deepti Naval; Rakesh Bedi; Neena Gupta
- Cinematography: Sunil Sharma filmed in Bombay
- Edited by: David Dhawan
- Music by: Kuldeep Singh
- Distributed by: Mr Talwar
- Release date: 4 March 1982
- Running time: 145 minutes
- Country: India
- Language: Hindi

Saath Saath (Together) is a 1982 Indian Hindi-language drama film written and directed by Raman Kumar and produced by Dilip Dhawan. It stars Farooque Sheikh and Deepti Naval in the lead roles, and was first released in India on 4 March 1982.

== Plot ==
Avinash Verma, an M.A. student, is an idealistic young man with socialist beliefs and strict principles. He is unaffected by his generation's materialism and is adamantly opposed to accumulating more wealth than is required. Although he is the son of a wealthy landowner, he has moved out of his father's home owing to philosophical disagreements. He earns a living as a freelance writer. His classmate Geetanjali Gupta, also known as Geeta, who is the daughter of a textile mill owner, develops a crush on him because of his worldview. Geeta also leaves her father's house, and they marry and are soon expecting a kid.To make both ends meet, Geeta takes up job of a teacher at a school and also starts taking private tuitions.Avinash's night shift job makes him difficult to meet Geeta even once in a day. Taking care of this family presents challenges for Avinash. He must work at the publishing company Satish Shah, a classmate, owns due to his precarious financial situation. He soon begins to adopt the traits of a ruthless businessman and travels the route he previously detested. Geeta is astonished by his change in principles and decides to leave him. Avinash admits his mistake, quits his job, and joins the publishing company of his former professor Choudhary.

== Cast ==
- Farooq Shaikh as Avinash Verma
- Deepti Naval as Gitanjali Gupta "Geeta"
- Satish Shah as Satish Shah
- Rakesh Bedi as Rakesh
- Neena Gupta as Neena
- Avtar Gill as Avtar
- A. K. Hangal as Professor Chaudhary
- Iftekhar as Mr. Gupta
- Javed Khan as Javed
- Yunus Parvez as Jagat Murari
- Gita Siddharth as Mrs Gupta (Voice)
- Anjan Srivastav as Dr. B. M. Acharya
- Helena as Helena
- Kiran Vairale as Kiran
- Sudha Chopra as Professor

== Soundtrack ==
All lyrics are written by Javed Akhtar; all music is composed by Kuldeep Singh.

Songs
No.	Title	Playback	Length
1.	"Yu Zindagi Ki Raah Mein"	Chitra Singh
2.	"Pyaar Mujh Se Jo Kiya Tumne Toh Kya Payogi"	Jagjit Singh
3.	"Tum Ko Dekha To Yeh Khayaal Aaya"	Jagjit Singh, Chitra Singh
4.	"Yeh Bata De Mujhe Zindagi"	Jagjit Singh, Chitra Singh
5.	"Ye Tera Ghar Ye Mera Ghar"	Jagjit Singh, Chitra Singh
6.	"Tum Ko Pata Hai (College Ka Ek Ladka)"	Pushpa, Ashok Khosla, Murli Dhar, Chorus
