= Naya Daur (1957 film) =

1957 film by B.R. Chopra

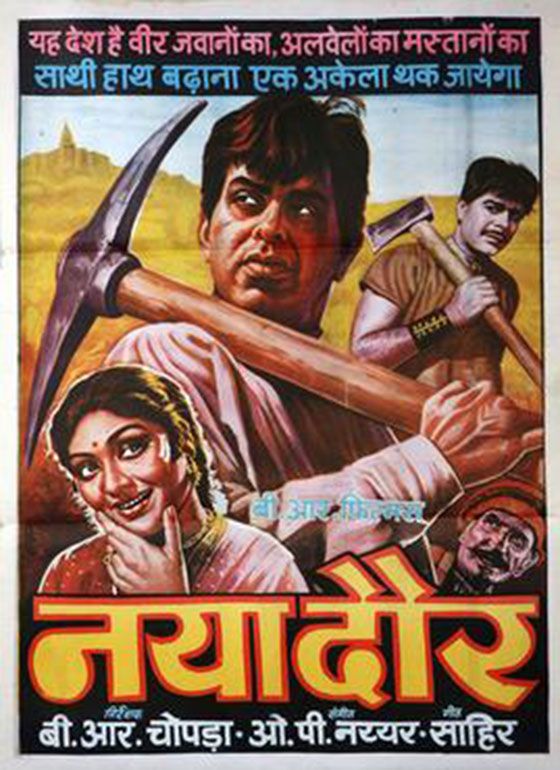
- Theatrical release poster
- Directed by: B. R. Chopra
- Written by: Kamil Rashid
- Screenplay by: Akhtar Mirza
- Story by: Akhtar Mirza
- Produced by: B. R. Chopra
- Starring: Dilip Kumar; Vyjayanthimala
- Cinematography: M.N. Malhotra
- Edited by: Pran Mehra
- Music by: O. P. Nayyar
- Distributed by: B. R. Films
- Release date: 15 August 1957
- Running time: 162 minutes
- Country: India
- Language: Hindi
- Budget: ₹14 lakh
- Box office: ₹5.4 crore (India)

Naya Daur (transl. The New Era) is a 1957 Indian Hindi-language social drama film directed and produced by B. R. Chopra. It was written by Akhtar Mirza. It stars Dilip Kumar, Vyjayanthimala in lead roles, along with Ajit, Jeevan, Johnny Walker, Chand Usmani, Nazir Hussain, Manmohan Krishna, Leela Chitnis, Pratima Devi, Daisy Irani, Radhakishan form an ensemble cast. The film narrates the story of Shankar and Krishna, two best friends who fall for the same woman, Rajni.

For this film, Dilip Kumar won the Filmfare Award for Best Actor for the third time in a row, being his fourth overall. The film was later dubbed in Tamil as Pattaliyin Sabatham (The Proletariat's Vow) in 1958. Naya Daur also inspired Aamir Khan's Academy Award nominated film Lagaan (2001).

Naya Daur was the second-highest grossing Indian film of the year 1957 and also the second-highest grossing Indian film of the decade, behind Mother India (1957). At the time of its release, it briefly became the highest grossing Indian film ever; later being surpassed by Mother India (1957). By many sources, it remains one of the top 10 highest-grossing Indian films of all time when adjusted for ticket-price inflation. It became the highest-grossing sports film ever at the time of its release and remains one of the highest ticket-selling sports film, despite its release only in India.

== Plot ==
The tongawala Shankar and the woodcutter Krishna are best friends in a poor village. At a train station, Shankar meets Rajni, who arrives there with her mother and brother. Shankar and Rajni fall in love with each other. At the same time, Krishna also sees Rajni and falls for her.

Kundan from the city arrives in the village and wants to modernize and mechanize the business which he does so by getting an electric saw thus making several workers at the mill lose their jobs. When Shankar and Krishna both come to know that they both love Rajni, they plan on deciding on who will marry her; if Rajni offers white flowers when she goes to the temple, she will marry Shankar and if she offers yellow flowers, she will marry Krishna. Manju, Shankar's sister who is in love with Krishna, hears the conversation and stealthily switches Rajni's yellow flowers with white flowers at the temple. Krishna, who sees Manju switching the flowers, thinks that Shankar has told her to do this and it leads Krishna and Shankar into a fight. The saddened Shankar tells Rajni that he would not have fallen for her if he had known that his friend also loved her. Rajni becomes heartbroken after hearing this and tells him that she can not change her feelings for him, but he can if he wants and goes away.

Kundan introduces a bus in the village thus taking away the tongawalas' livelihood. They ask him to remove it, but he refuses. Shankar says that what he has done is for the betterment of himself only. Kundan, however, tells Shankar that if he can drive his tonga faster than the bus then he will remove the latter. Shankar agrees to do it but the rest of the tongawalas tell him not to as the bus will be faster. Shankar consents to the race and asks for three months to prepare for the race. He makes a plan to build a road, which is six miles shorter than the road which leads to the temple. The disturbed villagers tell Shankar that he has gone mad with his stubbornness and do not support him in making the road, letting him do it alone.

Shankar starts to lose heart when he starts to build the road alone, but Rajni joins him, saying that she will always be with him, which makes Shankar happy. Soon, the rest of the tongawalas join them to build the road. Krishna joins Kundan's side and asks him to help to make sure that the road does not get completed. The villagers, all together, overcome difficulties along the way and finally finish the building. Krishna decides to take things into his own hands and breaks the bridge made by the villagers which was the most important path of the road. Manju sees him doing this and confronts Krishna and tells him that she changed the flowers on her own and not on the words of her brother as she loves him. Krishna on hearing this realises his mistake and starts repairing the bridge immediately with the help of Manju.

Finally, the race takes place with Shankar emerging as the victor. Krishna comes to congratulate Shankar and both friends make up with each other furthermore Shankar and Rajni unite while Krishna and Manju unite with each other.

== Cast ==
- Dilip Kumar as Shankar
- Vyjayanthimala as Rajni
- Ajit as Krishna
- Jeevan as Kundan
- Johnny Walker as Anjana
- Chand Usmani as Manju
- Nazir Hussain as Seth Maganlal
- Manmohan Krishna as Jumman Dada
- Leela Chitnis as Shankar & Manju's Mother
- Pratima Devi as Rajni's Mother
- Daisy Irani as Chiku Master
- Radhakishan as Narayan
- Moolchand as Railway Passenger asking for Horse Cart (Guest Appearance)
- Minoo Mumtaz as Dancer / Singer in the song "Reshmi Salwar, Kurta Jaali Ka"
- Kumkum as Dancer / Singer in the song "Reshmi Salwar, Kurta Jaali Ka"

== Production ==
Naya Daur was directed and produced by B. R. Chopra under his banner B. R. Films, which was established by him in 1955 and had produced the commercially and critically successful family drama Ek Hi Raasta, starring Meena Kumari and Sunil Dutt, in the next year.

During filming, the Naya Daur production was involved in a highly controversial and widely publicised court case. Initially, the actress Madhubala was cast as the female lead. An advance payment was given to her and shooting began and continued smoothly for 15 days. B.R. Chopra, the director, wanted the unit to travel to Bhopal for an extended outdoor shoot. Ataullah Khan, the father of Madhubala, objected to this and claimed that the entire Bhopal schedule was a ruse to give Dilip Kumar the opportunity to romance his daughter (Kumar and Madhubala were in a relationship at the time). With Madhubala no longer completing the film, Chopra sued for the cash advance she received from him. Madhubala supported her father, while Kumar testified against Madhubala and her father in favour of B.R. Chopra in open court. The case was lost by Madhubala and her father amid much negative publicity. During the case, the film was released and declared a success. Chopra eventually dropped the court case.

== Music ==
Naya Daur

Soundtrack album by O. P. Nayyar
- Released: 15 August 1957
- Genre: Feature film soundtrack
- Length: 69:37
- Language: Hindi
- Label: Saregama
- Producer: O. P. Nayyar

O. P. Nayyar chronology
| Mai Baap (1957) | Naya Daur (1957) | Tumsa Nahin Dekha (1957) |

All the songs were composed by O. P. Nayyar and the lyrics were penned by Sahir Ludhianvi, with playback by Mohammed Rafi, Asha Bhosle, Shamshad Begum and S. Balbir.

| Song | Singer | Raga |
|---|---|---|
| "Aana Hai To Aa" | Mohammed Rafi | |
| "Dil Leke Daga Denge" | Mohammed Rafi | |
| "Main Bambai Ka Babu" | Mohammed Rafi | |
| "Yeh Desh Hai Veer Jawanon Ka, Albelon Ka" | Mohammed Rafi, S. Balbir | |
| "Mangke Saath Tumhara, Maine Mang Liya Sansar" | Mohammed Rafi, Asha Bhosle | |
| "Uden Jab Jab Zulfen Teri, Kunwariyon Ka Dil Machle" | Mohammed Rafi, Asha Bhosle | |
| "Sathi Hath Badhana, Sathi Hath Badhana" | Mohammed Rafi, Asha Bhosle | Dhani (raga) |
| "Reshmi Salwar, Kurta Jaali Ka" | Shamshad Begum, Asha Bhosle | Bhairav (raga) |
| "Ek Deewana Aate Jate" | Asha Bhosle | |

- The lastly mentioned solo song by Asha Bhosle, is neither in the film, nor in the film soundtrack.

=== Tamil songs ===
All the songs in Tamil were composed by O. P. Nayyar and lyrics were penned by Kambadasan. Playback singers are T. M. Soundararajan, Seerkazhi Govindarajan, P. Susheela and T. V. Rathnam.

| Song | Singer |
|---|---|
| "Vaaraai Neeye, Vaa Potri Vaa" | Seerkazhi Govindarajan |
| "Dil Leke Daga Denge" | T. M. Soundararajan |
| "Naan Bambaaiyin Baabu" | T. M. Soundararajan |
| "Thaainaadu Idhe Veeram Migundhorkke" | T. M. Soundararajan, Seerkazhi Govindarajan |
| "Vaazhvil Un Korikkai Pole" | T. M. Soundararajan, P. Susheela |
| "O! Undhan Mugil Surul En Munkoondhal" | T. M. Soundararajan, P. Susheela |
| "Vaazhga Vaazhga Paattaaliye" | T. M. Soundararajan, P. Susheela |
| "Angiyodu Nijaar Anindhu Vandhaaye" | T. V. Rathnam, P. Susheela |

== Release ==
Naya Daur collected around ₹5.4 crore, becoming the second highest-grossing film of 1957 behind Mother India. This was equivalent to $11.34 million in 1957, (Note: 4.7619 Indian rupees per US dollar from 1951 to 1965) or $130 million (₹9.63 billion) adjusted for inflation.

== Critical reception ==
Naya Daur received positive reviews from critics, with the screenplay and performances gaining the most attention. On 13 September 1957, Filmfare wrote, "A powerful and vibrantly gripping picture, B. R. Films' Naya Daur is a distinctly successful combination of pertinent social education and moral and top-rate entertainment." The critic appreciated Kumar's performance and noted that he "[turns] in a portrayal which is utterly magnificent in every phase and mood". The Times of India called the film "a picture with a purposeful and distinctly impressive theme ... from almost the beginning to the end", saying that it "remains a brilliant, beautiful and very entertaining". Bombay (present-day Mumbai) newspaper Bharat Jyoti found the film to be "one of the most ambitious and unusual subjects ventured in India". Screen said that it was "one of the most important films made in this country" at the time. A critic from the magazine Eve's Weekly believed that it "truly a [Mahatma] Gandhi among films".

Amrita Bazar Patrika saw that Chopra "has delivered a commendable film" with Naya Daur, and found the film "combines ... purposeful and [picturesque] theme[s]". Reviewing it in Lucknow, the daily Pioneer described the film as "the straightforward natural drama [that] develops grip as the story unfolds itself and scales the very height of dramatic expression." The Hindu's critic felt that it implied Gandhi's quote, "There is no room for machinery that would displace human labor and concentrate power in a few hands." Sport and Pastime praised the film for "provides wholesome entertainment with a purpose", stating, "Naya Daur is a picture of which the industry should be proud of." The Indian Express noted, "What strikes one most in this film is its sense of mission and the remarkable, almost infectious enthusiasm of practically everybody in it ..."

== Awards ==
5th Filmfare Awards:

Won

- Best Actor – Dilip Kumar
- Best Music Director – O. P. Nayyar
- Best Story – Akhtar Mirza

== Re-release ==
Naya Daur was colourised and re-released in 2007, along with the re-release of another film starring Dilip Kumar, Mughal-e-Azam. However, this re-release failed commercially. Lack of extensive promotion was cited to be the major reason behind the commercial failure.

== Legacy ==
Aamir Khan's Academy Award nominated film Lagaan (2001) was inspired by Naya Daur.
