= Aziz Mirza =

Indian film director and producer (born 1947)

- Born: 1 January 1947 (age 78)
- Occupations: Film director; screenwriter; film producer
- Years active: 1985–2008
- Children: 2
- Father: Akhtar Mirza
- Relatives: Saeed Akhtar Mirza (brother)

Aziz Mirza (born 1 January 1947) is an Indian film director, producer and screenwriter, who is known for his works in Hindi films and television.

== Personal life ==
Mirza is the son of screenwriter Akhtar Mirza, and brother of filmmaker Saeed Mirza.

== Career ==
Mirza started his career in 1985 when he joined his brother Saeed Mirza and veteran director Kundan Shah to set a new production company called Iskra. He made his directional debut with the 1989 television serial Circus starring Ashutosh Gowariker and Shah Rukh Khan.

He made his film debut with Raju Ban Gaya Gentleman (1992) starring Khan and Chawla. The movie was inspired by Raj Kapoor's classic comedy Shree 420 (1955). His next project, Yes Boss (1997) starring Aditya Pancholi, Shah Rukh Khan and Juhi Chawla.

In 1999, Mirza set up the production company Dreamz Unlimited with Juhi Chawla and Shah Rukh Khan. Their first film Phir Bhi Dil Hai Hindustani (2000) was directed by Mirza himself. In 2003, Mirza directed his third venture under Dreamz Unlimited, titled Chalte Chalte starring Shah Rukh Khan and Rani Mukerji. The film was the first box office hit from the production house. After this, he took a hiatus from film directing due to the death of his wife. In 2007, Mirza returned to directing and released his next film titled Kismat Konnection in 2008, starring Shahid Kapoor and Vidya Balan.

== Filmography ==
=== Film ===
Year	Title	Director	Screenwriter	Producer
1992	Raju Ban Gaya Gentleman	Yes	Yes	No
1997	Yes Boss	Yes	Yes	No
2000	Phir Bhi Dil Hai Hindustani	Yes	No	Yes
2003	Chalte Chalte	Yes	Yes	No
2008	Kismat Konnection	Yes	No	No

=== Television ===
Year	Film	Director
1987	Nukkad	Yes
1989	Circus	Yes
