= Philips Top 10 =

Indian show

- Created by: Zee TV
- Directed by: Shahab Shamsi
- Country of origin: India

Production
- Running time: 60 min

Original release
- Network: Zee TV
- Release: 1994 – 1999

Philips Top 10 is a Record chart show that aired on Zee TV. It was named so since it was sponsored by Philips India. The name later changed to Colgate Top 10.

This Indian TV countdown show started in 1994 and used chart ratings as collected by Music India Ltd., an association of music labels in India. It was shot in India, Nepal and Mauritius. With tongue in cheek humour and stylised spy vs spy format, it was hugely popular. It was on the lines of Chitrahaar, the international Billboard Chart and the famous Radio programme Cibaca Geetmala. Other popular countdown shows on other TV channels included Superhit Muqabla on Doordarshan, BPL Oye, on Channel V, Ek Se Badhkar Ek, on Doordarshan and Hum Aapke Hain Kountdown on Sony TV.

It garnered its highest television rating point (trp) of 48 during its run time.

== Cast ==
- Javed Jaffrey
- Baba Sehgal
- Bhavna Balsavar
- Viju Khote
- Satish Shah
- Pankaj Kapur as Nitu Singh
- Satish Kaushik as Noni Singh
- Saurabh Shukla
- Shakti Kapoor
- Farooque Shaikh
- Navneet Nishan
- Mohan Kapur
- Sonal Dabral
