= Circus (Indian TV series) =

Indian television series

- Genre: Drama
- Created by: Aziz Mirza; Kundan Shah
- Written by: V K Sharma
- Directed by: Aziz Mirza
- Starring: Shahrukh Khan; Sunil Shende; Rekha Sahay; Renuka Shahane; Sameer Khakhar; Ashutosh Gowariker
- Composer: Kuldeep Singh
- Country of origin: India
- Original language: Hindi
- No. of seasons: 1
- No. of episodes: 19

Production
- Camera setup: Multi-camera
- Running time: 25 minutes

Original release
- Network: DD National
- Release: 1989 – 1990

Circus is a 1989 Indian television series directed by Aziz Mirza and Kundan Shah, set in a circus troupe, starring Shahrukh Khan, Makarand Deshpande, Pavan Malhotra, Ashutosh Gowariker, Neeraj Vora, and Hyder Ali.

== Cast ==
- Shah Rukh Khan as Shekharan Rai
- Sunil Shendey as Sahdevan Rai a.k.a. Babuji, Shekharan' Father
- Sameer Khakhar as Chintamani
- Rekha Sahay as Valsamma
- Naeem Shah as Sultan
- Amrut Patel as Professor Bowkar
- Renuka Shahane as Maria
- Satish Kaul as Aditya
- Anita Sarin as Prabha
- Dimple Hirji as Minaz
- Naresh Suri as John Jonathan/Joe, Maria's Father
- Haidar Ali as Subroto, Ringmaster
- Somesh Agarwal as Gupta
- Pavan Malhotra as Rasik
- Ashutosh Gowariker as Vicky
- Makrand Deshpande as Kanti
- Neeraj Vora as Changu
- Sharad Bhagtani as Mangu
- Sidharth Basu as Circus Staff
- Sunil Advani as Swami
- Anil Kumar

=== Guest cast ===
- Rama Vij as Shyamli
- Puja Bhatkal as Bulbul

== Episodes ==
Animal seller, visits Apollo Circus and requests Babuji, who is the owner of the Circus, to purchase a Bear as it would be of great benefit for his Circus but Babuji refuses citing an ongoing financial crisis. Rao, the owner of Atlas Circus meets Babuji and offers to buy his Circus which infuriates Babuji as he has no intention of selling his Circus which he has been running for close to 25 years. In the evening Jonathan has a heated argument with Kanti and Vicky, fellow artists of the Circus, and Sultan has to interfere to cool things down. Kanti and Vicky are fed of Jonathan's regular habit of getting drunk and picking up fights with everyone and wonder why Babuji doesn't throw him out of the Circus, to which Sultan replies that Babuji would never do that because Jonathan has always been loyal to Apollo Circus and did not bother to join a new Circus despite being the best Trapeze artist of the country. Many years ago, Jonathan was one of the star artists of Apollo Circus but due to an accident he lost his leg and had to take an early retirement. Later in the day, Babuji receives a call from his son Shekharan who informs him that he will soon be returning to India. Out of sheer happiness Babuji decides to buy a new Bear from Singh for his Circus.

Episode	Title	Featured Character(s)	Directed by	Written by	Cinematographer
1	"Episode 1"	Apollo Circus	Aziz Mirza	V.K.Sharma	Rajesh Joshi
2	"Episode 2"	Shekharan	Aziz Mirza	Makhan Singh	Binod Pradhan
3	"Episode 3"	Shekharan & Babuji	Kundan Shah	V.K.Sharma	Rajesh Joshi
4	"Episode 4"	Shekharan & Babuji	Aziz Mirza	Inayat Akhtar	Binod Pradhan
5	"Episode 5"	Shekharan	Kundan Shah	Mohafiz Haider	Rajesh Joshi
6	"Episode 6"	Aditya, Shyamli & Subroto	Aziz Mirza	Pramod Sharma	Binod Pradhan
7	"Episode 7"	Aditya, Shyamli, Subroto & Bulbul	Aziz Mirza	Inayat Akhtar	Binod Pradhan
8	"Episode 8"	Changu, Mangu & Bowkar	Kundan Shah	Bharat Karia	Rajesh Joshi
9	"Episode 9"	Prabha	Aziz Mirza	Hriday Lani	Virendra Saini
Prabha's contract with Apollo Circus has come to an end and she's going back to her village to get married, but her departure gets delayed as her Uncle doesn't visit to take her on the day he had promised he would. A day later when Prabha finally goes away from the Circus with her Uncle, Valsamma narrates her story to Aditya and talks about how she too had returned home once from the Circus but had to come back after realizing that nothing much had changed in her house and the reasons that had forced her to join the Circus were still there. A week later, Prabha returns to Apollo Circus informing that her brother has lost his job and has joined a two year course after which he would get a new job, so for the time being she would like to re-join the Circus to manage her house.
10	"Episode 10"	Minaz, Kanti & Rasik	Pushkar Singh	Mohafiz Haider	Ajay Tandon
11	"Episode 11"	Joe & Maria	Aziz Mirza	Makhan Singh	Virendra Saini
12	"Episode 12"	Maria & Shekharan	Aziz Mirza	Makhan Singh	Virendra Saini
13	"Episode 13"	TBA	Aziz Mirza	Bharat Karia	Rajesh Joshi
14	"Episode 14"	Kanti, Rasik & Minaz	Manoj Lalwani	Sushil Doshi	Ajay Tandon
15	"Episode 15"	Vicky	Kundan Shah	Pramod Sharma	Rajesh Joshi
16	"Episode 16"	Kalandar	Pushkar Singh & Manoj Lalwani	Pramod Sharma	Ajay Tandon
17	"Episode 17"	Shyamli, Subroto & Bulbul	Kundan Shah	Inayat Akhtar	Ajay Tandon
18	"Episode 18"	Shekharan & Babuji	Aziz Mirza	Mukesh Sharma	Rajesh Joshi
19	"Episode 19"	Shekharan	Aziz Mirza	V.K.Sharma	Rajesh Joshi
