= Virendra Saini =

Virendra Saini is a double National Film Award winner; the first as a cinematographer, and the second as a director. He has done the cinematography for quite a few acclaimed filmmakers, including Saeed Mirza

== Awards and accolades ==
- National Film Award for Best Cinematography, Salim Langde Pe Mat Ro, 1990
- National Film Award for Best Children's film, Kabhi Paas Kabhi Fail, 1999

Virendra Saini is one of the 24 reputed filmmakers who returned their National Film Awards in protest against the government.

== Filmography ==
Cinematographer

- 2000 - Choo Lenge Akash
- 1995 - Naseem
- 1994 - Kabhi Haan Kabhi Naa
- 1989 - Salim Langde Pe Mat Ro
- 1986-1987 - Nukkad (TV Series)
- 1984 - Mohan Joshi Hazir Ho!
- 1983 - Dhrupad (Documentary)
- 1981 - Chasm Buddoor
- 1980 - Albert Pinto Ko Gussa Kyon Ata Hai
- 1980 - Satah Se Uthata Aadmi
- 1980 - Sparsh
- 1978 - Arvind Desai Ki Ajeeb Dustan

Director

- 2007 - Foto
- 2000 - Choo Lenge Akash
- 1999 - Kabhi Paas Kabhi Fail (debut film)
- 1991 - Goongi Tareekh (TV Series)

== Posts Held ==
- Former director of FTII
- Member of the Advisory Board - Kautik International Student Film Festival
