= Saeed Akhtar Mirza =

Indian screenwriter and director

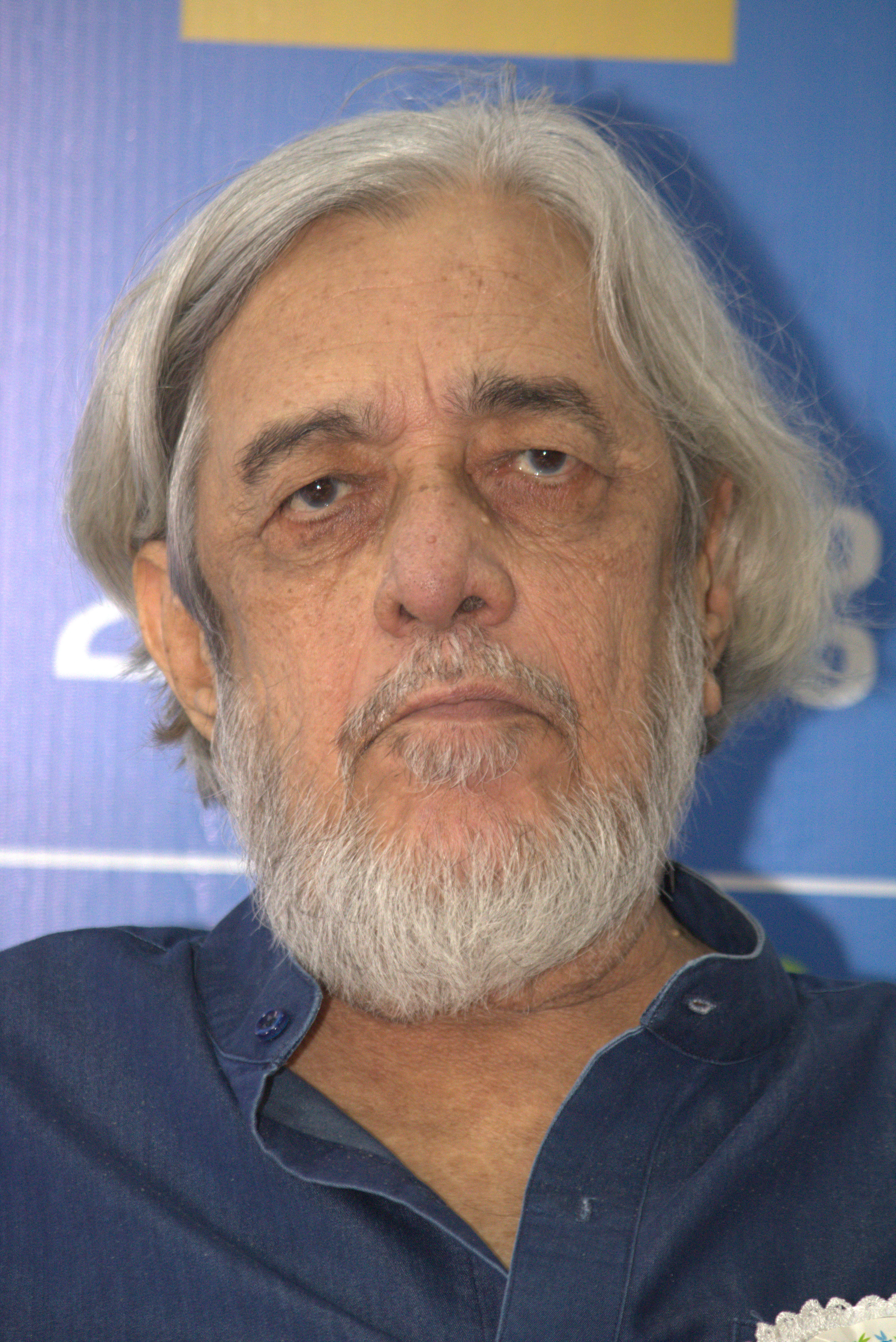
- Born: 30 June 1943 (age 83); Bombay, Bombay Province, British India
- Occupations: Film director, screenwriter
- Awards: National Film Award for Best Direction: Naseem (1995)

Saeed Akhtar Mirza (born 30 June 1943) is an Indian screenwriter and director in Hindi films and television. He is the maker of notable parallel films such as Mohan Joshi Hazir Ho! (1984), Albert Pinto Ko Gussa Kyoon Aata Hai (1980), Salim Langde Pe Mat Ro (1989) and Naseem (1995), which won two National Film Awards in 1996.

Saeed Mirza Was Honored with Lifetime Achievement Award at ICA – International Cultural Artifact Film Festival in 2020.

He is director of the TV serials Nukkad (Street Corner) (1986) and Intezaar (Wait) (1988), along with various documentary films on social welfare and cultural activism. He is also a trustee of ANHAD, a Delhi-based NGO working for communal harmony.

== Early life and education ==
Saeed was born on 30 June 1943, in Mumbai, Maharashtra to Akhtar Mirza, noted screenwriter himself in the 1960s.

After working in advertising for some time, Mirza joined the Film and Television Institute of India (FTII), Pune, India, from where he graduated in 1976, having specialized in film direction. Subsequently, later in his career, he also taught at the institute, going on to become chairman of the premier institute.

== Career ==
Saeed Akhtar Mirza started his career as a documentary film maker in 1976, graduating to films with the acclaimed Arvind Desai Ki Ajeeb Dastaan (1978), about the frustrations of an idealistic youth caught in the trap of a feudal money culture. It won the Filmfare Critics Award for Best Movie for the year. This was followed by Albert Pinto Ko Gussa Kyoon Aata Hai (1980), about an angry youth, in search of his class and ethnic identifications. This too won the Filmfare Critics Award for Best Movie. Next in this series of his films based on the urban middle class, came his satire on the Indian judicial system, Mohan Joshi Hazir Ho! (1984), an old couple which struggles for years in their legal case that runs for years under a corrupt judiciary, in nexus with real-estate developer. Set in the urban 'middle class', his film chronicled their struggles and search of identity in a rapidly changing landscape and economic conditions. Then finally in his angst-ridden movies came, Salim Langde Pe Mat Ro (1989), starring Pawan Malhotra, an archetypal Muslim youth caught in the circle of crime and recrimination, and their collective state amidst growing communalism, ghetto mentality, and a search for an ethnic identity which does not clash with a national identity.

Meanwhile, he directed and produced popular TV serials Nukkad (Street Corner) (1986) and Intezaar (Wait) (1988), the first was set in lower middle class of various communities, which meet at a street corner in Mumbai suburb, shared their struggle of everyday survival in a harsh world, and was a big hit. He has lectured widely on Indian cinema at universities in India and The US. He contributes regularly to Indian newspapers and magazines on current political debates and through film reviews.

His last film Naseem was released way in 1995 set in collapsing secular structure post Babri Masjid demolition era. The film was featured in Avijit Ghosh's book, 40 Retakes, Bollywood Classics you May Have Missed. After that as he put it, "The demolition of the Babri Masjid was the last straw. Naseem was almost like an epitaph. After the film, I had really nothing to say. I needed to regain my faith and retain my sanity. So I decided to travel around India and document it on a video camera".

Subsequently, he devoted his time to travelling, writing and making documentaries. Later started on his autobiographical work, finally released in 2008, as his maiden novel named Ammi: Letter to a Democratic Mother which is about the memories of his mother who died in 1990 and a series of vignettes comprising Sufi fables, childhood memories.

Saeed Akhtar Mirza is the life member of International Film And Television Club of Asian Academy of Film & Television. Currently he is making film, Ek Tho Chance.

Saeed reportedly says about his films:

"We made movies with a certain vision and integrity and prayed like hell that they would work. It wasn't intended for amorphous viewing, but they got collectively branded as parallel cinema. But we came from the same tradition as Mehboob Khan and Guru Dutt".

== Personal life ==
His father Akhtar Mirza was a noted film script writer, with credits like Naya Daur and Waqt. His brother is Aziz Mirza, the Bollywood director responsible for launching Shahrukh Khan, after directing the 1989 television serial Circus.

He lives in Mumbai and Goa with his wife Jennifer. His sons Safdar and Zahir live in New York and Dubai, respectively.

== Filmography ==
- Slum Eviction (1976)
- Murder (1976)
- Ghashiram Kotwal (1976) (This film explores Indira Gandhi's reign and the period of 'Emergency'
- An Actor Prepares (1976)
- Urban Housing (1977)
- Arvind Desai Ki Ajeeb Dastaan (1978)
- Albert Pinto Ko Gussa Kyoon Aata Hai (1980) (A peek into the life of the catholic community in Mumbai)
- Piparsod (1982)
- Mohan Joshi Hazir Ho! (1984)
- The Rickshaw Pullers of Jabalpur (1984) (V)
- Nukkad (1986) TV series
- Is Anybody Listening? (1987) (V)
- We Shall Overcome (1988) (V)
- Intezzar(1988) TV series
- Salim Langde Pe Mat Ro (1989)
- Ajanta and Ellora (1992)
- Naseem (1995)
- Ek Tho Chance (2009)

=== Writer ===
- Arvind Desai Ki Ajeeb Dastaan (1978) (story)
- Albert Pinto Ko Gussa Kyoon Aata Hai (1980)
- Mohan Joshi Hazir Ho! (1984) (screenplay and story)
- Salim Langde Pe Mat Ro (1989) (screenplay and story)
- Naseem (1995)
- Choo Lenge Akash (2001)
- Karma Cafe (short) (2018)

=== Producer ===
- Albert Pinto Ko Gussa Kyoon Aata Hai (1980)

Saeed Mirza: The Leftist Sufi (2016), a documentary film on Mirza and his works directed by Kireet Khurana and Padmakumar Narasimhamurthy, was released in 2016.

== Awards ==
- 1979 Filmfare Critics Award for Best Movie: Arvind Desai Ki Ajeeb Dastaan (1978)
- 1981 Filmfare Critics Award for Best Movie: Albert Pinto Ko Gussa Kyoon Aata Hai (1980)
- 1984 National Film Award for Best Film on Family Welfare: Mohan Joshi Hazir Ho! (1984)
- 1990 National Film Award for Best Feature Film in Hindi: Salim Langde Pe Mat Ro (1989)
- 1996 National Film Award for Best Direction: Naseem (1995)
- 1996 National Film Award for Best Screenplay: Naseem (1995)

== Novels ==
- Ammi: Letter to a Democratic Mother (2008)
- The Monk, the Moor & Moses Ben Jalloun (2012)
