= Ulti Ganga =

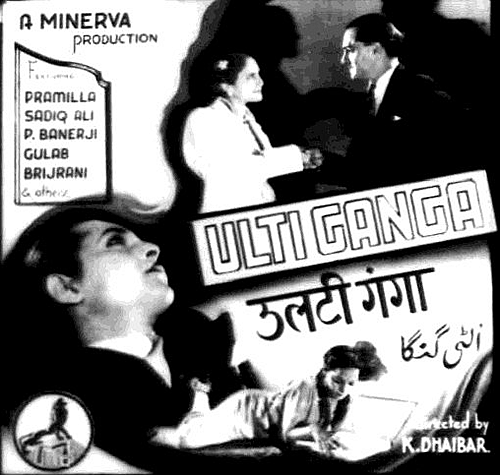
- poster
- Directed by: Keshavrao Dhaiber
- Starring: Gulab; Pramila
- Release date: 1942
- Country: India
- Language: Hindi

Ulti Ganga is a 1942 Bollywood film directed by Keshavrao Dhaiber.

== Plot ==
The film depicted that what happens when gender roles are reversed.

== Cast ==
- Pramila Devi
- Sadiq Ali
- Paresh Banerji
- Gulab
- Abu Bakar
- Eruch Tarapore
- Brijrani

== Production ==
The film was produced under banner of Minerva Movietone.
