= Nukkad =

- Genre: Comedy drama
- Written by: Prabodh Joshi; Anil Chaudhary
- Directed by: Saeed Akhtar Mirza; Kundan Shah
- Starring: see below
- Music by: Kuldeep Singh
- Country of origin: India
- Original language: Hindi
- No. of episodes: 40

Production
- Camera setup: Multi-camera
- Running time: 24 minutes

Original release
- Network: DD National
- Release: 1986 – 1987

Nukkad (transl. Street Corner) is an Indian Hindi-language television series that aired on DD National in 1986–87. It was directed by Kundan Shah, Aziz Mirza and Saeed Akhtar Mirza; it was written by Prabodh Joshi and Anil Chaudhary.

It starred Dilip Dhawan, Rama Vij, Pavan Malhotra, Sangeeta Naik, Avtar Gill in lead roles. The serial received a tremendous response from the viewers, and some of the characters such as Khopdi, Kaderbhai and Ghanshu Bhikari became household names. The first season of Nukkad, aired from 3 November 1986–87 had 40 episodes. A sequel series titled Naya Nukkad (transl. New Street Corner) premiered in 1993.

== Overview ==
Nukkad dealt with the struggles of the lower income labor class in cities.

== Cast ==
- Dilip Dhawan—Guru (a.k.a. Raghunath) is a small-time electrician and the de facto leader of the Nukkad gang. Helpful and impartial by nature, Guru is often useful in resolving petty quarrels between the Nukkad residents)
- Avtar Gill—Kaderbhai (a.k.a. Kader Kutty) owns a small dingy restaurant which often becomes a meeting point for other Nukkad members. He is generous and does not charge the poor Nukkad members for tea and snacks)
- Pavan Malhotra—Hari (a.k.a. Hari Mourya) is a humble hard working youth who owns a small shop for repairing bicycles and filling air in bicycle tyres. Hari is besotted with Madhu, the attractive, a.k.a. daughter of Gupta seth. However Gupta seth despises their romance and is always watchful of Hari & Madhu.)
- Sameer Khakhar—Khopdi (a.k.a. Gopal) is a chronic drunkard who is loved by all)
- Haidar Ali—Raja (a.k.a. Raja Patel) is a smooth talking vagabond who moves around smartly dressed in a suit and with an "I know it all" attitude)
- Somesh Agarwal— Kundu Mochi (the cobbler by the streetside)
- Javed Khan—Karim Hajaam. Karim is a barber and owns a small hair cutting salon.
- Sangeeta Naik—Radha (the domestic maid) works in the houses at Nukkad. She loves Hari and is annoyed that he does not reciprocate and instead loves Madhu.)
- Rama Vij—Teacherji (a.k.a. Maria) is a widow who lives alone. Guru and Maria both love each other, but do not explicitly confess their love.
- Ajay Wadhavkar—Ganpat Havaldar. Ganpat is the neighborhood havaldar often called in whenever there is trouble at Nukkad.
- Suresh Chatwal—Dukhiya shayar (a.k.a. Dukhiya Chandigarhi) is an unemployed "shayar" who lives for free with Guru. Dukhiya bores everybody with meaningless shayaris (couplets). He along with Khopdi and Raja form the unemployed trio who live off other's money.
- Suresh Bhagwat—Ghanshu Bhikari (a.k.a. Ghanshyam) is the beggar at Nukkad.
- Shreechand Makhija Chaurasia Paanwala. Chaurasia is a paanwala with a paan-beedi shop next to Kaderbhai's restaurant.
- Sankalp Dubey Thambi Waiter (waiter at Kaderbhai's restaurant)
- Masud Akhtar Dagdu Jamadar (municipality sweeper at Nukkad)
- Bengali Bandwala (an old trumpet player)
- Kalabaaz (a man who gathers paid people for political rallies)
- Kishore Bhatt - Gupta Seth (owner of grocery stores)
- Maniklal Seth (owner of a silverware shop)
- mamta - Madhu

Other characters included Madhu (Hari's love interest and daughter of Gupta seth), Suresh (rich spoilt son of Seth Maniklal) and the wives of Maniklal and Guptaji.
