= Gulzar filmography =

Filmography of Indian film director, lyricist and writer Gulzar

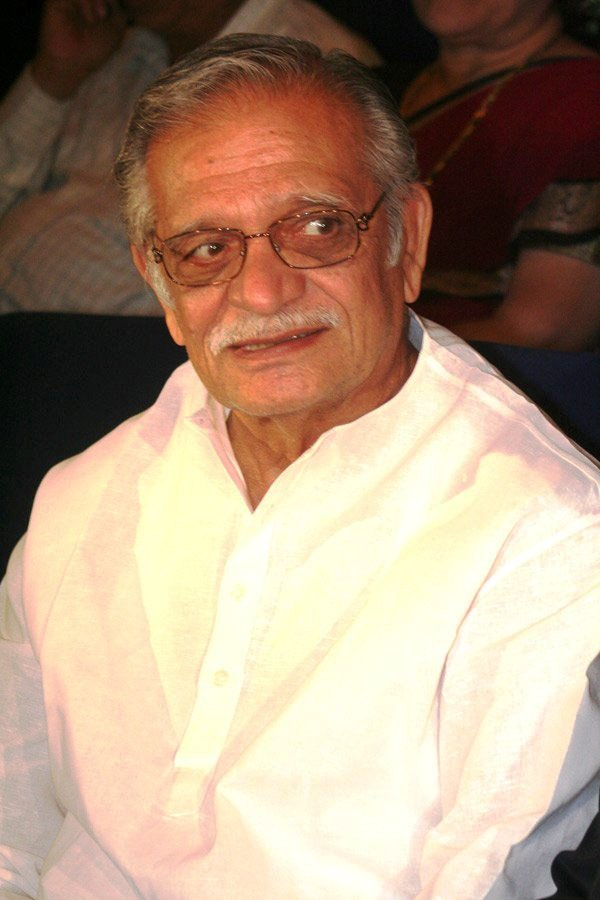
Gulzar in 2008

Sampooran Singh Kalra, better known as Gulzar, is an Indian poet, lyricist, screenwriter, film producer and director.

== Films ==
| Year | Film | Lyricist | Dialogue | Screenwriter | Director | Producer | Notes |
|---|---|---|---|---|---|---|---|
| 1960 | Shriman Satyawadi | Yes | | | | | |
| 1961 | Kabuliwala | Yes | | | | | |
| 1962 | Prem Patra | Yes | | | | | |
| 1963 | Bandini | Yes | | | | | |
| 1965 | Purnima | Yes | | | | | |
| 1966 | Biwi Aur Makan | Yes | | | | | |
| 1966 | Pinjre Ke Panchhi | Yes | | | | | |
| 1966 | Sannata | Yes | | | | | |
| 1968 | Aashirwad | Yes | Yes | | | | |
| 1968 | Sunghursh | | Yes | | | | |
| 1968 | Do Dooni Chaar | Yes | Yes | | | | |
| 1969 | Khamoshi | Yes | Yes | | | | |
| 1969 | Rahgir | Yes | | | | | |
| 1971 | Mehboob Ki Mehndi | | | Yes | | | |
| 1971 | Anand | Yes | Yes | Yes | | | |
| 1971 | Mere Apne | Yes | | | Yes | Yes | |
| 1971 | Guddi | Yes | Yes | Yes | | | |
| 1971 | Anubhav | Yes | | | | | |
| 1971 | Seema | Yes | | | | | |
| 1972 | Parichay | Yes | | | Yes | Yes | |
| 1972 | Koshish | Yes | | | Yes | Yes | |
| 1972 | Bawarchi | Yes | Yes | | | | |
| 1973 | Achanak | Yes | | Yes | Yes | Yes | |
| 1973 | Namak Haraam | | Yes | Yes | | | |
| 1974 | Doosri Sita | Yes | | | | | |
| 1975 | Aandhi | Yes | Yes | Yes | Yes | Yes | |
| 1975 | Khushboo | Yes | | | Yes | Yes | |
| 1975 | Chupke Chupke | | Yes | Yes | | | |
| 1975 | Faraar | | | Yes | | | |
| 1975 | Mausam | Yes | Yes | Yes | Yes | Yes | |
| 1976 | Shaque | Yes | | | | | |
| 1977 | Palkon Ki Chhaon Mein | Yes | | Yes | | | |
| 1977 | Gharaonda | Yes | | | | | |
| 1977 | Kinara | Yes | | Yes | Yes | Yes | |
| 1977 | Kitaab | Yes | | Yes | Yes | Yes | |
| 1978 | Ghar | Yes | | | | | |
| 1978 | Devata | Yes | | | | | |
| 1978 | Khatta Meetha | Yes | | | | | |
| 1979 | Griha Pravesh | Yes | Yes | Yes | | | |
| 1979 | Gol Maal | Yes | | | | | |
| 1979 | Meera | Yes | Yes | Yes | Yes | Yes | |
| 1979 | Ratnadeep | Yes | | | | | |
| 1980 | Sitara | Yes | | | | | |
| 1980 | Khubsoorat | Yes | | | | | |
| 1980 | Swayamvar | Yes | | | | | |
| 1980 | Thodisi Bewafaii | Yes | | | | | |
| 1981 | Naram Garam | Yes | | | | | |
| 1981 | Baseraa | Yes | Yes | Yes | | | |
| 1981 | Sannata | Yes | | | | | |
| 1982 | Angoor | Yes | Yes | Yes | Yes | Yes | |
| 1982 | Namkeen | Yes | Yes | | Yes | Yes | |
| 1983 | Masoom | Yes | | Yes | | | |
| 1983 | Sadma | Yes | | | | | |
| 1983 | Zara Si Zindagi | | Yes | | | | |
| 1984 | Situm | Yes | | | | | |
| 1984 | Tarang | Yes | | | | | |
| 1985 | Ghulami | Yes | | | | | |
| 1986 | Jeeva | Yes | | Yes | | | |
| 1986 | New Delhi Times | | | Yes | | | |
| 1987 | Ijaazat | Yes | Yes | Yes | Yes | Yes | |
| 1988 | Libaas | Yes | | | | Yes | |
| 1991 | Lekin... | Yes | | Yes | Yes | Yes | |
| 1993 | Rudaali | Yes | | | | | |
| 1993 | Maya Memsaab | Yes | | | | | |
| 1994 | Mammo | Yes | | | | | |
| 1996 | Maachis | Yes | | | Yes | Yes | |
| 1997 | Chachi 420 | Yes | Yes | | | | |
| 1997 | Aastha: In the Prison of Spring | Yes | | | | | |
| 1997 | Daayraa | Yes | | | | | |
| 1998 | Dil Se.. | Yes | | | | | |
| 1998 | Satya | Yes | | | | | |
| 1998 | Swami Vivekananda | Yes | | | | | |
| 1999 | Hu Tu Tu | Yes | | Yes | Yes | Yes | |
| 1999 | Jahan Tum Le Chalo | Yes | | | | | |
| 1999 | Rockford | Yes | | | | | |
| 1999 | Khoobsurat | Yes | | | | | |
| 2000 | Fiza | Yes | | | | | |
| 2000 | Zindagi Zindabad | Yes | | | | | |
| 2001 | Asoka | Yes | | | | | |
| 2001 | Aks | Yes | | | | | |
| 2002 | Filhaal... | Yes | | | | | |
| 2002 | Dil Vil Pyar Vyar | Yes | | | | | |
| 2002 | Lal Salam | Yes | | | | | |
| 2002 | Leela | Yes | | | | | |
| 2002 | Makdee | Yes | | | | | |
| 2002 | Saathiya | Yes | Yes | | | | |
| 2003 | Pinjar | Yes | | | | | |
| 2004 | Raincoat | Yes | | | | | |
| 2004 | Chupke Se | Yes | | | | | |
| 2004 | Maqbool | Yes | | | | | |
| 2005 | Yahaan | Yes | | | | | |
| 2005 | Paheli | Yes | | | | | |
| 2005 | Bunty Aur Babli | Yes | | | | | |
| 2006 | Jaan-E-Mann | Yes | | | | | |
| 2006 | Sabab | Yes | | | | | |
| 2006 | Omkara | Yes | | | | | |
| 2007 | Dum Kaata | Yes | | | | | |
| 2007 | No Smoking | Yes | | | | | |
| 2007 | Shafaq | Yes | | | | | |
| 2007 | Just Married | Yes | | | | | |
| 2007 | Jhoom Barabar Jhoom | Yes | | | | | |
| 2007 | Guru | Yes | | | | | |
| 2007 | The Blue Umbrella | Yes | | | | | |
| 2007 | Dus Kahaniyaan | | | Yes | | | Writer for the segment Gubbare |
| 2008 | Slumdog Millionaire | Yes | | | | | |
| 2008 | Yuvvraaj | Yes | | | | | |
| 2009 | Kaminey | Yes | | | | | |
| 2009 | Firaaq | Yes | | | | | |
| 2009 | Billu | Yes | | | | | |
| 2010 | Raavan | Yes | | | | | |
| 2010 | Striker | Yes | | | | | |
| 2010 | Ishqiya | Yes | | | | | |
| 2010 | Veer | Yes | | | | | |
| 2010 | Raajneeti | Yes | | | | | |
| 2010 | Dus Tola | Yes | | | | | |
| 2011 | Chala Mussaddi... Office Office | Yes | | | | | |
| 2011 | Teen Thay Bhai | Yes | | | | | |
| 2011 | Kashmakash (Dubbed) | Yes | | | | | |
| 2011 | 7 Khoon Maaf | Yes | | | | | |
| 2012 | Do Paise Ki Dhoop, Chaar Aane Ki Baarish | Yes | | | | | |
| 2012 | Jab Tak Hai Jaan | Yes | | | | | |
| 2013 | Shoebite | Yes | | | | | Unreleased |
| 2013 | Ek Thi Daayan | Yes | | | | | |
| 2013 | Matru Ki Bijlee Ka Mandola | Yes | | | | | |
| 2014 | Lingaa (Dubbed) | Yes | | | | | |
| 2014 | Kill Dil | Yes | | | | | |
| 2014 | Haider | Yes | | | | | |
| 2014 | Dedh Ishqiya | Yes | | | | | |
| 2014 | Kya Dilli Kya Lahore | Yes | | | | | |
| 2015 | Talvar | Yes | | | | | |
| 2015 | Drishyam | Yes | | | | | |
| 2016 | Mirzya | Yes | Yes | Yes | | | |
| 2016 | Motu Patlu: King of Kings | Yes | | | | | |
| 2017 | Ok Jaanu | Yes | | | | | |
| 2017 | Rangoon | Yes | | | | | |
| 2018 | Mohalla Assi | Yes | | | | | |
| 2018 | Pataakha | Yes | | | | | |
| 2018 | Soorma | Yes | | | | | |
| 2018 | Bioscopewala | Yes | | | | | |
| 2018 | Raazi | Yes | | | | | |
| 2019 | The Sky Is Pink | Yes | | | | | |
| 2019 | Mere Pyaare Prime Minister | Yes | | | | | |
| 2021 | 1232 KMS | Yes | | | | | Documentary |
| 2022 | Darlings | Yes | | | | | |
| 2022 | Sherdil: The Pilibhit Saga | Yes | | | | | |
| 2022 | Ponniyin Selvan:I (Dubbed) | Yes | | | | | |
| 2023 | Kuttey | Yes | | | | | |
| 2023 | Ponniyin Selvan:II (Dubbed) | Yes | | | | | |
| 2023 | Khufiya | Yes | | | | | |
| 2023 | Sam Bahadur | Yes | | | | | |
| 2025 | Crazxy | Yes | | | | | |
| 2025 | Gustaakh Ishq | Yes | | | | | |
| 2026 | O'Romeo | Yes | | | | | |

== Television ==
| Year | Series | Lyricist | Writer | Director | Producer | Notes |
|---|---|---|---|---|---|---|
| 1984 | Fushigi no Kuni no Alice | Yes | | | | Title track of the Hindi dubbed version |
| 1985 | Ek Akar, Documentary about (S.Sukhdev)Sukhdev Singh Sandhu | | Yes | | F.D.I (Films Division India) | |
| 1988 | Mirza Ghalib | Yes | Yes | Yes | | |
| 1988 | Denver, the Last Dinosaur | Yes | | | | Title track of the Hindi dubbed version |
| 1989 | The Jungle Book | Yes | | | | Title track of the Hindi dubbed version "Jungle Jungle Baat Chali Hai" released in 1993. |
| 1990 | Noopur | | Yes | | | |
| 1991 | Potli Baba Ki | Yes | Yes | Yes | | |
| 1993–1994 | Kirdaar | Yes | Yes | Yes | Yes | |
| 1994 | Daane Anaar Ke | Yes | | | | Title song Daane Anar Ke |
| 1995 | Hello Zindagi | Yes | | | | Title song Hai lau zindagi |
| 1999 | Pal Chhin | Yes | | | | Title song Koi atka hua hai pal shayad |
| 1999 | Gubbare | Yes | | | | Title song |
| 1999 | Saans | Yes | | | | Title song |
| 2000 | Siski | Yes | | | | Title song |
| 2000 | Son Pari | Yes | | | | Title song |
| 2004 | Tehreer Munshi Premchand Ki | | Yes | Yes | | |
| 2009 | Panaah | Yes | | | | Title song |
| 2012 | Motu Patlu | Yes | | | | Title song |
| 2017 | Gattu Battu | Yes | | | | Title song |

== Other work ==
| Year | Work | Notes |
|---|---|---|
| 1987 | Dil Padosi Hai | Lyrics; Music album with Asha Bhosle and Rahul Dev Burman |
| 1991 | Vadaa | Lyrics; Music album with Amjad Ali Khan, Sadhana Sargam and Roop Kumar Rathod |
| 1992 | Main Aur Mera Saaya | Translated Bhupen Hazarika's original Assamese folk-songs into Hindi, and gave a commentary. |
| 1999 | Marasim | Lyrics; Music album with Jagjit Singh |
| 2000 | Sunset Point | Lyrics; Music album with Vishal Bhardwaj, Bhupinder and K. S. Chithra |
| 2001 | Visaal | Lyrics; Music album with Ghulam Ali |
| 2002 | Udaas Pani | Lyrics; Music album with Abhishek Ray |
| 2002 | Kabir By Abida Parween | Recited |
| 2004 | Ishqa Ishqa | Lyrics; Music album with Vishal Bhardwaj |
| 2005 | Raat Chand Aur Main | Lyrics; Music album with Abhishek Ray |
| 2006 | Koi Baat Chale | Lyrics; Music album with Jagjit Singh songs written in Triveni |
| 2006 | Boodhe Pahadon Par | Lyrics; Music album with Suresh Wadkar and Vishal Bhardwaj |
| 2007 | Amrita Pritam | Recited in tribute to Amrita Pritam |
| 2011 | Barse Barse | Music album with Suresh Wadkar and Vishal Bhardwaj; Lyricist for songs "Aisa To Hota" and "Zindagi Sehle" |
| 2016 | Gulzar in conversation with Tagore | Translation of lyrics for Tagore's songs plus additional lyrics Music album with Shantanu Moitra, Shreya Ghoshal and Shaan |
| 2018 | Jai Hind India | Theme song for Hockey World Cup. Music composed by A. R. Rahman |
