= Shahid Kabir =

Indian poet (1932–2001)

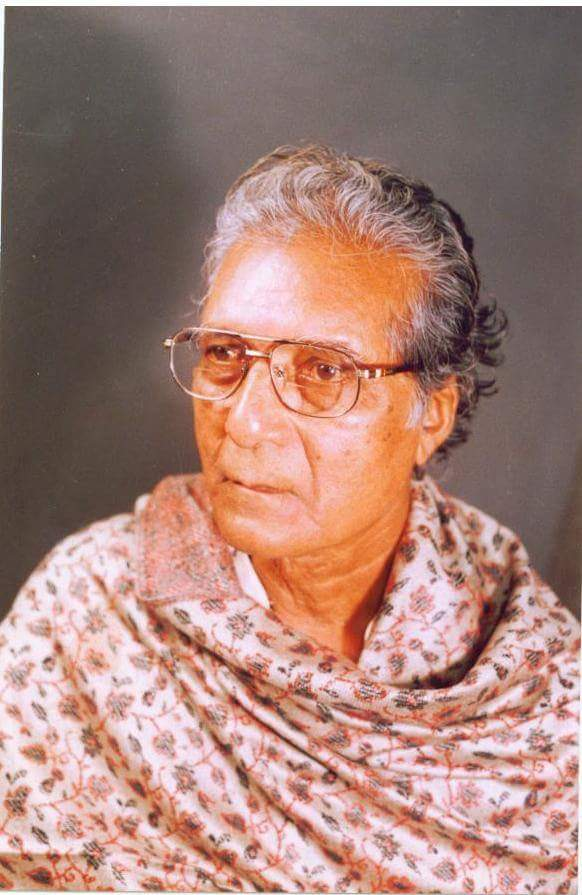
- Poet Shahid Kabir
- Born: Shahid Kabir Mohammad Israil; 1 May 1932; Nagpur, Central Provinces and Berar, British India
- Died: 11 May 2001 (aged 69)
- Education: Bachelor of Arts
- Occupations: poet, writer
- Spouse(s): Akhtar Kabir (1960-2001), his death
- Children: Seema Rehman (daughter); Khalid Kabir (son); Sajid Kabir (son); Faraz Kabir (son); Almas Javed (daughter); Sameer Kabeer (son); Shiraza Haque (daughter)
- Writing career
- Language: Urdu, Hindi
- Years active: 1952 - 2001
- Genres: Ghazal, Geet, Novel
- Notable works: Kachchi Deewaren (1958); Charon Aour (Urdu-1968); Mitti Ka Makan (Urdu-1979); Pehchaan (Urdu - 1999); Pehchaan (Devnagri-2002)

Signature
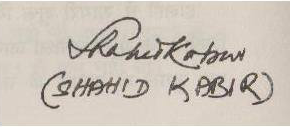

Shahid Kabir (1 May 1932 – 11 May 2001) was an Urdu language poet and writer from Maharashtra, India. He was an active writer from 1952, writing poetry, short stories and articles. He was well-known mainly for his ghazals. His significant works include Kachchi Deewaren (1958; Novel), Charon Aour (1968; Collection of ghazal) and Pehchaan (1999; Collection of ghazal). He was recognised by the Maharashtra State Urdu Academy. His ghazals have been sung by several Indian singers including Jagjit Singh, Chitra Singh, Hariharan, Chandan Dass, Munni Begum Shishir Parkhie and Sabri brothers.

== Life ==
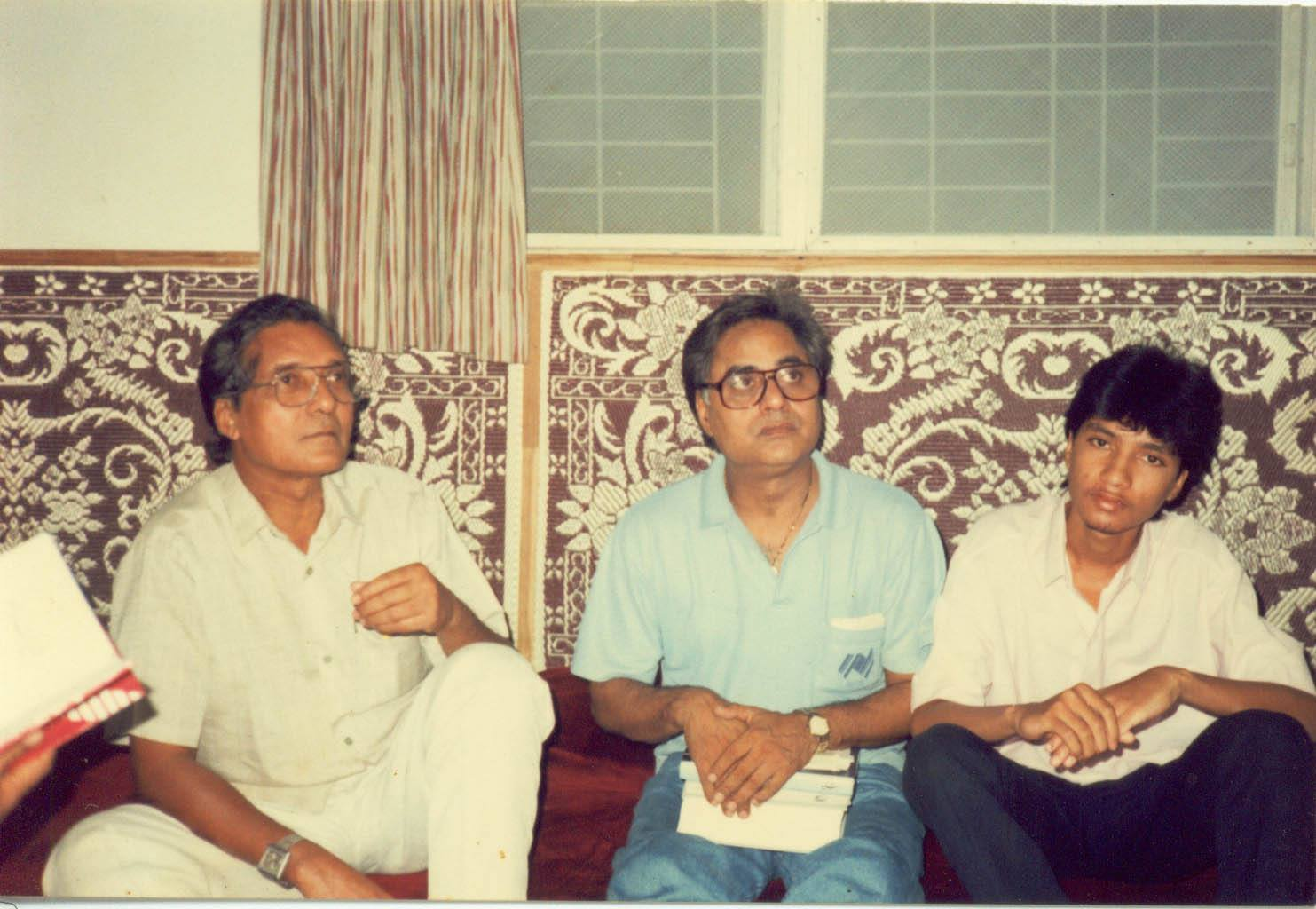
Shahid Kabir with Jagjit Singh and his son, Sameer Kabeer

Kabir was born on 1 May 1932 in Nagpur, in the western Indian state of Maharashtra, to Mohammad Israil and Khairun Nisa. He was educated at Anjuman High School. He completed his Bachelor of Arts at Junior College, Nagpur, with Urdu as one of his subjects. He married Akhtar Kabir in 1960, with whom he had three daughters; Seema, Almas and Shiraza; and four sons; Khalid, Sajid, Faraz and Sameer. His son Sameer Kabeer is also a poet.

== Career ==
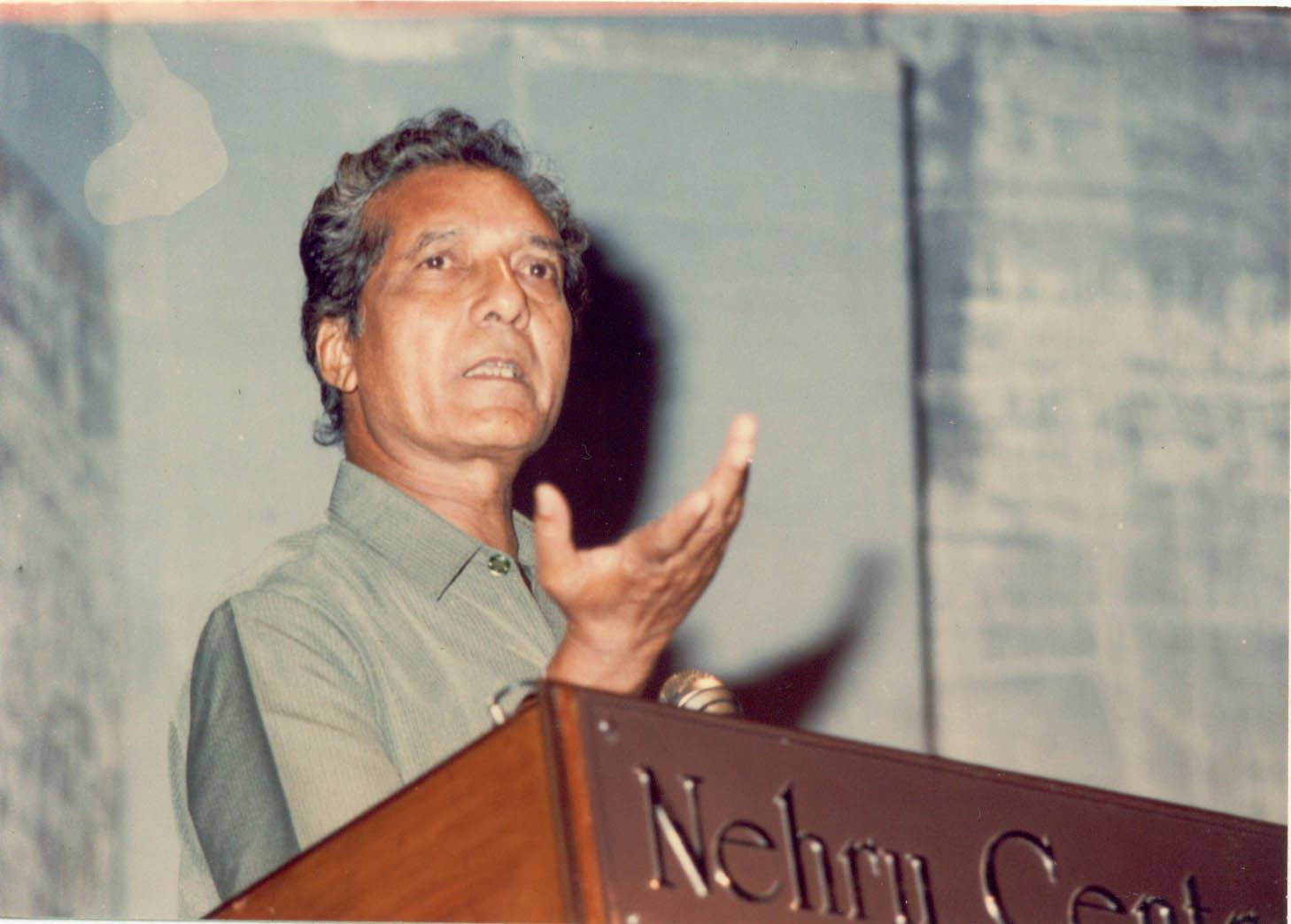
Poet Shahid Kabir at Nehru Centre, Mumbai - 1994

In 1950, Kabir worked in the Food and Marketing Department of the central government in Delhi, where he met other poets such as Ali Sardar Jafri, Zuber Rizvi and Naresh Kumar Shad. He was influenced by their work and started to write his own poems. Subsequently, he was transferred to Nagpur. The first of his poems to be set to music was a ghazal, Phoolon ki barsaat, which was sung in the Qawwali style by Hanif Agrawal. Over time, his ghazals were sung by other well-known singers such as Hariharan, Jagjit Singh, Chitra Singh, Lata Mangeshkar, Pankaj Udhas, Udit Narayan and Rahat Fateh Ali Khan. His ghazal, Uski gali mein phir mujhe ek baar len chalo, has been sung and popularised by many singers including Rais Khan, Munni Begum, Chandan Dass, Salman Alvi and the Sabri brothers. In 1957, Kabir was the Screenwriter for the drama Mirza Ghalib presented in the Fine Arts Drama Competition at Rastrapati Bhawan, New Delhi. He served as member of the Nagpur University Board of Studies for the Urdu language from 1991 to 1995.

== Works ==
Kachchi Deewaren, his first book (Novel), was published in 1958, followed by Charon Aour (1968; Collection of ghazals), Mitti Ka Makan (1979; Collection of ghazals) and Pehchaan (1999; Collection of ghazals). Pehchaan was also published in Devanagari script in 2002, compiled by his son Sameer Kabeer. A collection of his geet, ghazals and nazm, Us Ki Gali, was compiled by Sameer Kabeer in Devanagari and Urdu script and published in 2014. Kabir established the link between the Reevayati (old) shayari and the Jadid (new) shayari. His ghazal 'Thukrao ab ke pyar karo' featured in the 1999 album 'A Journey' by Jagjit Singh.

== Recognition ==
His collection of ghazals Mitti Ka Makan (1979) and Pehchaan (1999) were awarded prizes by the Maharashtra State Urdu Academy. His collection of modern ghazals Charon Aour was included in a course at Dr. Babasaheb Ambedkar Marathwada University. His poems have been included in Urdu textbooks in India's 12th standard curriculum as prescribed by the Maharashtra State Board of Education.

== See also ==
- List of Urdu-language writers
