= Rajindar Nath Rehbar =

Indian Urdu poet and Bollywood lyricist

Rajendar Nath Rehbar
- Born: Rajendar Nath; 5 November 1931; Shakargarh, Punjab, British India
- Died: 13 November 2022 (aged 91); New Delhi, India
- Citizenship: Indian
- Education: MA, LLB
- Alma mater: Punjab University
- Occupations: Urdu poet, lyricist
- Spouse: Kailash Sharma
- Children: 1
- Writing career
- Genres: Ghazal, Nazm, Geet
- Notable awards: Shiromani Sahityakaar Award

Rajendar Nath Rehbar (5 November 1931 - 13 November 2022) was an Indian Urdu-language poet and Bollywood lyricist. He is the writer of the nazm Teri Khushboo Me Base Khat sung by ghazal singer Jagjit Singh. He is a disciple of the Urdu poet Ratan Pandoravi.

== Early and personal life ==
Rajindar Nath Rehbar was born on 5 November 1931 in Shakargarh Punjab Province (British India) (modern day Punjab, Pakistan). After initial years of primary schooling in Shakargarh, he studied in Punjab University where he completed his post-graduation from Khalsa College and did LLB from Punjab University.

Rehbar died on 13 November 2022 at the age of 91.

== Literary career ==
Rajendar Nath Rehbar started writing poetry in his childhood. He has written in several genres of Urdu literature like Ghazal and Nazm.

He has performed at more than 2000 shows and kavi sammelans over the last four decades including in foreign countries.

== Books ==
Rajendar Nath Rehbar has written ten books in different genres of Urdu literature. Some of his books are:

- Teri khushboo me bsae khat
- Kalss (1962)
- Malhaar (1975)
- Aur shaam dhal gayi (1978)
- Zeb-e-Sukhan (1997)
- Tere Khushboo Mein Bsae Khat (2003)
- Yaad Aaunga (2006)
- Urdu Nazm Mein Panjab Ka Hissa (2017)
- Tere Khushboo Mein Bsae Khat (second edition, 2017)
- Shyar Hamare (2020)

== Awards ==
- Shiromani Sahityakaar Award
- Dr. C Narayan Reddy Literary Award
- Pt. Ratan Pandoravi Award
- Life Time Achievement Award
- Firaq Gorakhpuri Award
- Amrita Preetam Samriti Samman
- Dushyant Kumar Rajat Samman

== Film/Album ==
Film/Album	Song	Music	Singer
Arth	"Tere Khushboo Mein Bsae Khat"	Jagjit Singh	Jagjit Singh|
Inteha	"Aaina Samne Rakkhoge To Yaad Aaunga"	Jagjit Singh	Jagjit Singh|
Rubaru	"Shaam Kathin Hai"	Ghazal Srinivas	Ghazal Srinivas|
Huzoor	"Kys Aaj Unse Apni Mulaqat Ho Gayi"	Sanjaye Vatsal	
