= Arth (film) =

- Poster
- Directed by: Mahesh Bhatt
- Written by: Mahesh Bhatt
- Screenplay by: Mahesh Bhatt; Sujit Sen
- Story by: Mahesh Bhatt
- Produced by: Kuljit Pal
- Starring: Shabana Azmi; Kulbhushan Kharbanda; Smita Patil; Raj Kiran; Rohini Hattangadi
- Cinematography: Pravin Bhatt
- Edited by: Keshav Hirani
- Music by: Jagjit Singh; Chitra Singh; Kaifi Azmi (lyrics); Rajendar Nath Rehbar (lyrics)
- Release date: 3 December 1982 (India)
- Running time: 138 minutes
- Country: India
- Language: Hindi
- Budget: ₹1 crore
- Box office: ₹2 crore

Arth (transl. Meaning) is a 1982 Indian Hindi drama film directed by Mahesh Bhatt, starring Shabana Azmi and Kulbhushan Kharbanda in lead roles and Smita Patil, Raj Kiran and Rohini Hattangadi in supporting roles. It features soundtrack by Ghazal couple, Jagjit Singh and Chitra Singh.

The semi-autobiographical film was written by Mahesh Bhatt about his extramarital relationship with Parveen Babi. It was listed as one of the 25 Must See Bollywood Movies by Indiatimes Movies. The film was remade in Tamil as Marupadiyum (1993) by Balu Mahendra. In 2017, Pakistani actor and director Shaan Shahid released Arth 2 with Bhatt as a "mentor" during production.

== Plot ==
Pooja, who grew up as an orphan girl and always dreamt of owning a house, becomes insecure when she finds out that she and her husband, Inder, have to vacate the apartment they rent. The twist that occurred when Inder gives her the keys to a new house proves to be double-edged, when it is revealed that he is in love with another woman, Kavita, with whom he earned the money (in the film industry) for the new apartment. While previously giving advice to her maid cheated by her husband, now Pooja becomes involved in a similar situation. When Inder deserts Pooja for Kavita, she chooses to leave the apartment for a women's hostel with only ₹2000 that she had when she got married. She is helped by Raj to surpass the difficulties of life as a single person, to find a job and to rely morally on herself. Raj and Pooja become good friends. Gradually, Kavita's mental instability deepens her fears of insecurity, even after Inder requests Pooja to sign the divorce papers.

Raj falls in love with Pooja and proposes to her. She refuses saying she is empty and cannot give him anything. Raj tries to persuade her saying that she cannot spend the rest of her life feeling miserable about the past and that she should try to find a new life for herself. Pooja promises to think about it.

Pooja's maid, whose only aim in life is to secure a good education for her daughter, has saved ₹1000 towards her admission fees. She finds out that her drunk husband has stolen the money. Furious, she searches for him to find him in the arms of his lover after spending all the money. She kills him and goes to the police station and confesses to her crime. Worried about her daughter, she calls Pooja who promises to take care of her daughter.

After the insistence of Kavita's mother and her personal doctor, Pooja personally assures Kavita that she is not interested in Inder anymore. However, Pooja's attitude only convinces Kavita that breaking Pooja's marriage was a mistake. To escape from her feeling of guilt and insecurity, she breaks up with Inder. The latter tries to revive his relationship with Pooja but is rejected.

Pooja continues to live with her maid's daughter and refuses to marry Raj saying that she has found a new meaning to life in being independent and being a mother to the child and marrying Raj will only weaken her.

== Cast ==
- Shabana Azmi as Pooja Malhotra
- Kulbhushan Kharbanda as Inder Malhotra
- Smita Patil as Kavita Sanyal
- Raj Kiran as Raj
- Rohini Hattangadi as Pooja's maid
- Dina Pathak as Kavita's mother
- Om Shivpuri as Kavita's doctor
- Mazhar Khan as Harish
- Gulshan Grover as Gulshan
- Dalip Tahil as Dilip
- Gita Siddharth as Aparna
- Siddharth Kak as Anil
- Shammi as Mrs. Bhalla
- Chand Usmani as School Administrator
- Kiran Vairale as Pooja's Hostel Roommate

== Soundtrack ==
All music is composed by Jagjit Singh and Chitra Singh.

No.	Title	Lyrics	Singer(s)	Length
1.	"Jhuki Jhuki Si Nazar"	Kaifi Azmi	Jagjit Singh
2.	"Koi Yeh Kaise Bataye"	Kaifi Azmi	Jagjit Singh
3.	"Tere Khushboo Mein Base"	Rajindar Nath Rehbar	Jagjit Singh
4.	"Too Nahin To Zindagi Mein"	Iftikhar Imam Siddiqi	Chitra Singh
5.	"Tum Itna Jo Muskura Rahe"	Kaifi Azmi	Jagjit Singh

== Box-office ==
The film was made on a budget of ₹1 crore and grossed ₹2 crore at the box-office and was declared as "Super Hit" by the box-office.

== Awards ==
Year	Award	Category	Nominee(s)	Result
1982	National Film Awards	Best Actress	Shabana Azmi	Won
1982	National Film Awards	Best Editing	Keshav Hirani	Won
1983	Bengal Film Journalists' Association Awards	Best Art Director	Madhukar Shinde	Won
1984	Filmfare Awards	Best Film	Kuljit Pal	Nominated
1984	Filmfare Awards	Best Director	Mahesh Bhatt	Nominated
1984	Filmfare Awards	Best Story	Mahesh Bhatt	Nominated
1984	Filmfare Awards	Best Dialogue	Mahesh Bhatt	Won
1984	Filmfare Awards	Best Actress	Shabana Azmi	Won
1984	Filmfare Awards	Best Supporting Actress	Rohini Hattangadi	Won
1984	Filmfare Awards	Best Supporting Actress	Smita Patil	Nominated
