= Gulzar =

Indian Urdu poet, lyricist and author (born 1934)

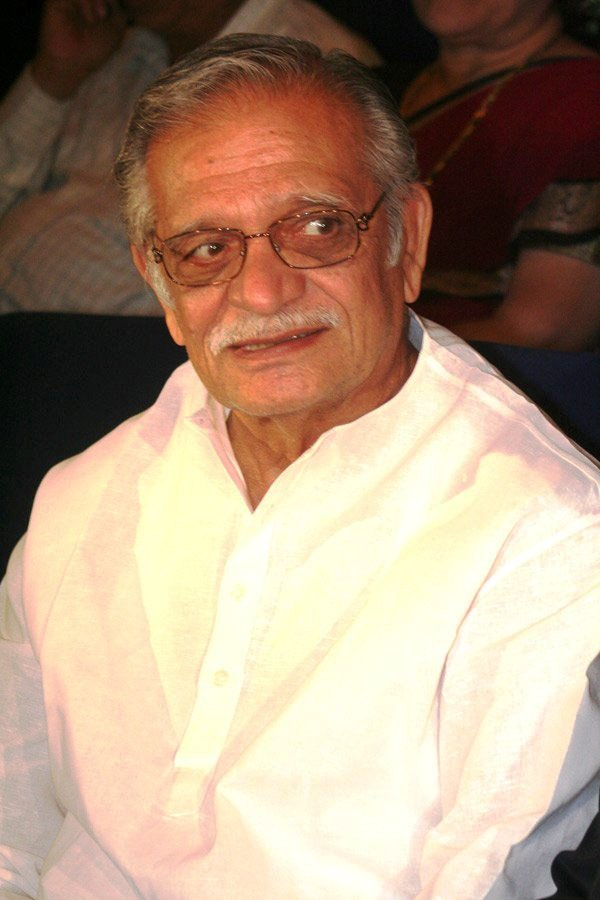
- Gulzar in 2008
- Pronunciation: [ɡʊlzɑːɾ]
- Born: Sampooran Singh Kalra; 18 August 1934 (age 92); Dina, Punjab, British India (present-day Punjab, Pakistan)
- Occupations: Lyricist; poet; author; screenwriter; film director; film producer
- Years active: 1956–present
- Works: Filmography; bibliography
- Spouse: Rakhee Gulzar (m. 1973; sep. 1974)
- Children: Meghna Gulzar (daughter)
- Awards: Sahitya Akademi Award (2002); Padma Bhushan (2004); Academy Award (2009); Grammy Award (2010); Dadasaheb Phalke Award (2013); Jnanpith Award (2024)

Gulzar (Note: Urdu pronunciation: [ɡʊlzɑːɾ].) (Urdu pronunciation: [ɡʊlzɑːɾ]; born Sampooran Singh Kalra; 18 August 1934) is an Indian Urdu poet, lyricist, author, screenwriter, and film director known for his works in Hindi cinema. He is regarded as an important Urdu poet of this era. He started his career with music director S.D. Burman as a lyricist in the 1963 film Bandini and worked with many music directors including R. D. Burman, Salil Chowdhury, Vishal Bhardwaj and A. R. Rahman. Gulzar also writes poetry, dialogues and scripts. He directed films such as Aandhi and Mausam during the 1970s and the TV series Mirza Ghalib in the 1980s. He also directed Kirdaar in 1993. He attended United Christian School Ludlow Castle Delhi. He indicated this in Rekhta Prog in an interview by Divya Dutta.

Gulzar has won 5 Indian National Film Awards; including 2 Best Lyrics, one Best Screenplay, one Second Best Feature Film (director), and one Best Popular Film (director); 22 Filmfare Awards; one Academy Award; and one Grammy Award. He was awarded the Sahitya Akademi Award - Hindi in 2002, the Padma Bhushan in 2004, the third-highest civilian award in India, and the Dadasaheb Phalke Award in 2013, the highest award in Indian cinema. In April 2013, Gulzar was appointed as the Chancellor of the Assam University. In 2024, Gulzar was awarded the Jnanpith, India's highest literary award.

== Early life ==
Gulzar was born in a Sikh Khatri family as Sampooran Singh Kalra, to Makhan Singh Kalra and Sujan Kaur, in Dina, Jhelum District, British India (present-day Pakistan). In school, he had read translations of the works of Tagore which he recounted as one of his life's many turning points. Due to the partition, his family split and he had to stop his studies and come to Mumbai (then called Bombay) to support his family. Sampooran took up many small jobs in Mumbai to eke out a living, including one at a garage at Vichare motors on Bellasis road (Mumbai). There he used to touch up accident-damaged cars by mixing shades of paint. He'd say, "I had a knack for colours". His father rebuked him for being a writer initially. He took the pen name Gulzar Deenvi and later simply Gulzar. In an interview with Rajyasabha TV, he recounted enjoying his work as a painter as it allowed him a lot of time to simultaneously read, write, attend college and be involved with the PWA (Progressive Writers Association).

== Career ==
=== Lyricist ===
It was during his interactions in the PWA Sunday meetings that Shailendra and Bimal Roy encouraged him to join films. Gulzar began his career under film directors Bimal Roy and Hrishikesh Mukherjee. His book Ravi Paar has a narrative of Bimal Roy and the agony of creation. He started his career as a songwriter with the music director for the movie Bandini (1963). In films, he found an environment associated with literature in the group he worked with, including Bimal Roy, most of whose films were based on literary works. Shailendra, who has penned the rest of the songs in the movie requested Gulzar to write the song "Mora Gora Ang Layle", sung by Lata Mangeshkar.

Directed and produced by Hrishikesh Mukherjee, the 1968 film Aashirwad had dialogues and lyrics written by Gulzar. Song lyrics and poems written by Gulzar gave the poetic attribute and the "much-needed additional dimension" to Ashok Kumar's role in the film. Ashok Kumar received the Best Actor at the Filmfare and at the National Film Awards for this role. Gulzar's lyrics, however, did not gain much attention until 1969's Khamoshi, where his song "Humne Dekhi Hai Un Aankhon Ki Mehekti Khushboo" (lit. 'I have seen the fragrance of those eyes') became popular. In his book Bollywood Melodies, Ganesh Anantharaman describes Gulzar's lyrics, with the purposeful mixing of the senses, to be "daringly defiant". (Note: Author Ganesh Anantharaman's book Bollywood Melodies won the Best Book on Cinema award at the 56th National Film Awards.) For the 1971 film Guddi, he penned two songs, of which "Humko Man Ki Shakti Dena" was a prayer which is still sung in many schools in India.

As a lyricist, Gulzar had a close association with the music director Rahul Dev Burman. He has also worked with Sachin Dev Burman, Shankar Jaikishan, Hemant Kumar, Laxmikant–Pyarelal, Madan Mohan, Rajesh Roshan, and Anu Malik. Gulzar worked with Salil Chowdhury in Anand (1971) and Mere Apne (1971); Madan Mohan in Mausam (1975), and more recently with Vishal Bhardwaj in Maachis (1996), Omkara (2006) and Kaminey (2009); A. R. Rahman in Dil Se.. (1998), Guru (2007), Slumdog Millionaire (2008) and Raavan (2010) and Shankar–Ehsaan–Loy in Bunty Aur Babli (2005). Gulzar took inspiration from Amir Khusrow's "Ay Sarbathe Aashiqui" to pen "Ay Hairathe Aashiqui" for Mani Ratnam's 2007 Hindi film Guru, which had music composed by A. R. Rahman. Another Ratnam-Rahman hit, "Chaiyya Chaiyya" from Dil Se.. also had lyrics written by Gulzar, based on the Sufi folk song "Thaiyya Thaiyya", with lyrics by poet Bulleh Shah. For another collaboration with Rahman for Danny Boyle's 2007 Hollywood film Slumdog Millionaire, Rahman and Gulzar won the Academy Award for Best Original Song for "Jai Ho" at the 81st Academy Awards. The song received international acclaim and won him a Grammy Award (shared with Rahman) in the category of Grammy Award for Best Song Written for a Motion Picture, Television or Other Visual Media. He also wrote a song for the Pakistani Drama Shehryar Shehzadi, and this song Teri Raza, has been sung by Rekha Bhardwaj and was composed by Vishal Bhardwaj.

=== Direction ===
After writing dialogues and screenplay for films such as Aashirwad, Anand and Khamoshi, Gulzar directed his first film Mere Apne (1971). The film was a remake of Tapan Sinha's Bengali film Apanjan (1969). Meena Kumari played the lead role of Anandi Devi, an old widow caught in between the local fights of unemployed and tormented youngsters. Anandi Devi's death in one of the fights makes them realise the futility of violence. The film was rated "Above Average" at the box office. He then directed Parichay and Koshish. Parichay was based on a Bengali novel, Rangeen Uttarain by Raj Kumar Maitra and inspired from the Hollywood film The Sound of Music. He wrote the story of Koshish based on the struggle faced by a deaf-dumb couple wherein Sanjeev Kumar won National Film Award for Best Actor. In 1973, he directed Achanak, inspired by the 1958 murder case KM Nanavati v State of Maharashtra, and the story writer Khwaja Ahmad Abbas earned a Filmfare nomination for Best Story. Later he directed Aandhi, based on the Hindi novel "Kaali Aandhi" by Kamleshwar. Along with various wins and nominations, the film also won Filmfare Critics Award for Best Movie. Although many believed the film was based on the life of former Indian Prime Minister Indira Gandhi, the film was actually based on the life of Bihari politician,Tarkeshwari Sinha. In the 1975's emergency, the film was banned from theatres. His next film Khushboo was based on Sharat Chandra Chattopadhyay's Pandit Mashay. His Mausam, which won the National Award for 2nd Best Feature Film, Filmfare Best Movie and Filmfare Best Director awards, along with other six Filmfare nominations, was loosely based on the story "Weather", from the novel, The Judas Tree, by A.J. Cronin. His 1982 film Angoor was based on Shakespeare's play The Comedy of Errors.

His films told stories of human relationships entangled in social issues. Libaas was a story of an extra-marital affair of an urban couple. Due to its objectionable subject, the film never got released in India. Mausam pictured a story of a father who tries to improve the life of his prostitute-daughter. In Maachis, a young Punjabi boy engages in terrorism to fight a bad situation only to realise its temporary nature. Hu Tu Tu dealt with corruption in India and how a man decides to fight it.

Gulzar uses "flashback" in the narration of his stories very effectively (Aandhi, Mausam, Ijaazat, Machis, Hu Tu Tu). He also has mutual partnerships with various actors and other crew. The Gulzar – Sanjeev Kumar partnership resulted in some fine films (Koshish, Aandhi, Mausam, Angoor, Namkeen) which represent Sanjeev Kumar's finest work as an actor. Actors like Jeetendra (Parichay, Khushboo, Kinara), Vinod Khanna (Achanak, Meera, Lekin) and Hema Malini (Khushboo, Kinara, Meera) worked with Gulzar to gain respectability as artists and delivered some of their best and most introspective works in film. R D Burman composed songs for almost all the movies directed by him in the 1970s and the 1980s (Parichay, Khushboo, Aandhi, Angoor, Ijaazat, Libaas). Many of their popular songs were sung by Kishore Kumar, Lata Mangeshkar and Asha Bhosle. These include "Musafir Hoon Yaron" (Parichay), "Tere Bina Zindagi Se Koi" (Aandhi), and "Mera Kuch Samaan" (Ijaazat).

In 1988, Gulzar directed an eponymous television serial Mirza Ghalib, starring Naseeruddin Shah and broadcast on Doordarshan. Later he also directed Tahreer Munshi Premchand Ki about the novels of Premchand.

=== Poetry ===
Gulzar primarily writes in Urdu and Punjabi; besides several other languages such as Braj Bhasha, Khariboli, Haryanvi and Marwari. His poetry is in the Triveni type of stanza. His poems are published in three compilations; Chand Pukhraaj Ka, Raat Pashminey Ki and Pandrah Paanch Pachattar. His short stories are published in Raavi-paar (also known as Dustkhat in Pakistan) and Dhuan (smoke).

For the peace campaign Aman ki Asha, jointly started by India's and Pakistan's leading media houses, Gulzar wrote the anthem "Nazar Main Rehte Ho", which was recorded by Shankar Mahadevan and Rahat Fateh Ali Khan. Gulzar has written ghazals for Ghazal Maestro Jagjit Singh's albums "Marasim" (1999) and "Koi Baat Chale" (2006).

=== Other contributions ===
Gulzar has written lyrics and dialogues for several Doordarshan TV series including Jungle Book, Alice in Wonderland, Hello Zindagi, Guchche and Potli Baba Ki with Vishal Bhardwaj. He has more recently written and narrated for the children's audiobook series Karadi Tales. Gulzar is also associated with Aarushi, Eklavya foundation, an NGO based in Bhopal, Madhya Pradesh working in the field of education. He has written stories and poetry for the magazine Chakmak. Gulzar has also worked in Bollywood movies like Anand, Mere Apne, Omkara and many more.

=== Academic ===
In April 2013, Gulzar was appointed as the Chancellor of the Assam University.

== Personal life ==
Gulzar is married to actress Raakhee. The couple has a daughter, Meghna Gulzar. Meghna Gulzar grew up with her mother and father and, after completing her graduation in filmmaking from New York University, went on to become a director of films such as Filhaal, Just Married, Dus Kahaniyaan, Talvar, Raazi, Sam Bahadur and Chhapaak (for which Gulzar wrote the lyrics) and authored the biography of her father Gulzar, in 2004.

== Awards and nominations ==
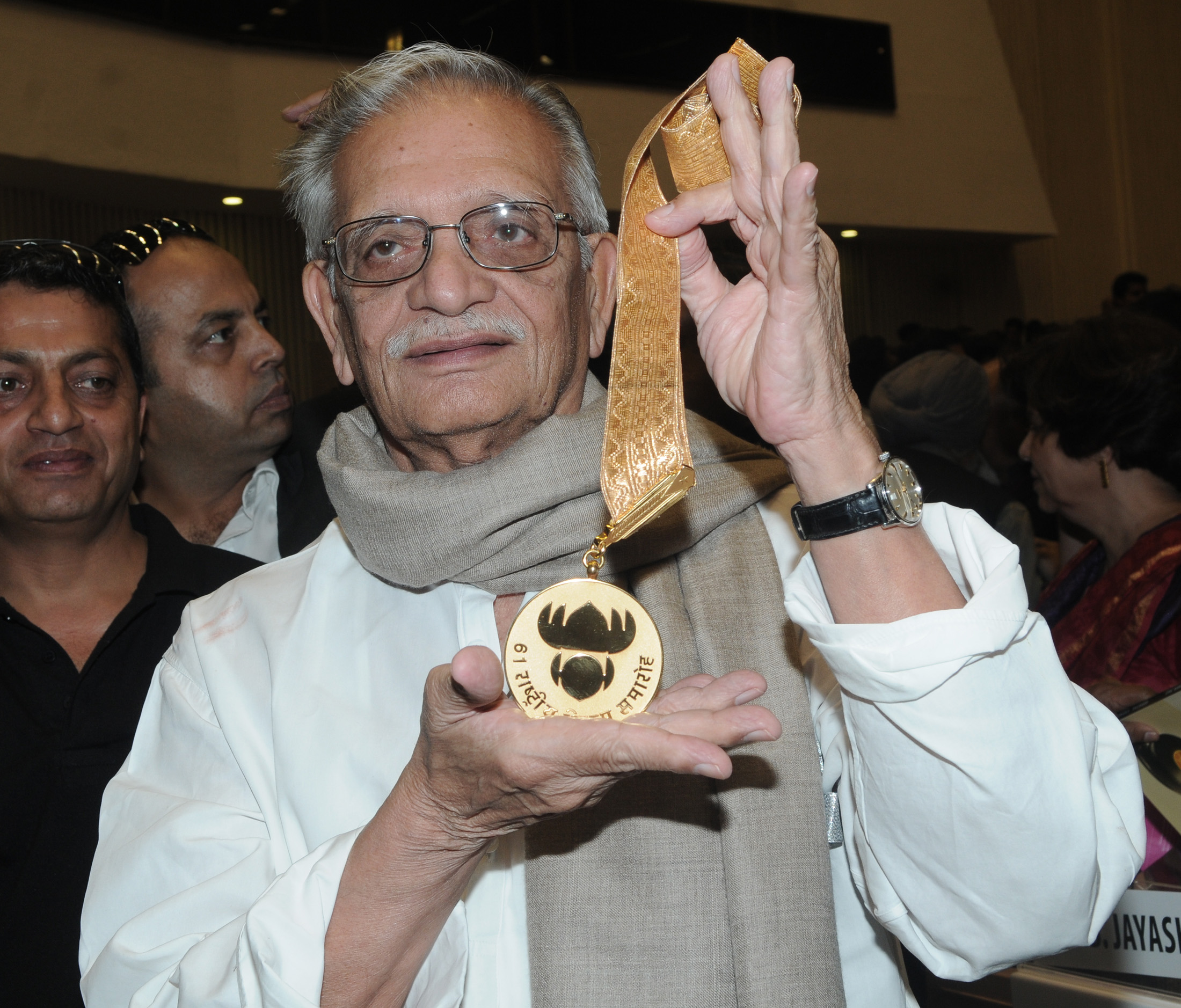
Gulzar received the Dadasaheb Phalke Award in 2013, presented by the President Pranab Mukherjee at the 61st National Film Awards

As on 2019, Gulzar has won a total of 36 awards and honours, including 5 National Film Awards, 22 Filmfare Awards, Rashtriya Kishore Kumar Samman from the Government of Madhya Pradesh for 1999–2000, 1 Academy Award for Best Original Song (2008), 1 Grammy Award (2010), 2002 Sahitya Akademi Award for Urdu, Padma Bhushan (2004), and 2013 Dadasaheb Phalke Award.

He received the Jnanpith Award in 2024.

== Works ==
Bibliography

- Gulzar (1999). Raavi Paar. Rupa & Co. ISBN 8171673899.
- Gulzar (2001). Dhuan. Sahitya Akademi Publications. ISBN 8126019360.
- Gulzar (2002). Raat Pashmine Ki. Rupa & Co. ISBN 8129102242.
- Gulzar (2003). Kharashein. Radhakrishna Prakashan. ISBN 9788171198498.
- Gulzar (2004). Meera. Radhakrishna Prakashan. ISBN 8171198813.
- Gulzar (2005). Pukhraj. Rupa & Co.
- Gulzar (2005). Triveni. Rupa & Co.
- Gulzar (2006). Autumn Moon. Rupa & Co. ISBN 8129109778.
- Gulzar (2008). Kuchh Aur Nazmein. Radhakrishna Prakashan. ISBN 978-8171198924.
- Gulzar (2010). Magical Wishes: The Adventures Of Goopy & Bagha. Scholastic. ISBN 978-8184778441.
- Gulzar (2011). Mirza Ghalib A Biographical Scenario. Rupa & Co. ISBN 978-8129117175.
- Gulzar (2012). Selected Poems. Penguin India. ISBN 978-0143418214.
- Gulzar (2013). Neglected Poems. Penguin India. ISBN 978-0143420293.
- Gulzar (2013). My Favourite Stories : Boskys Panchatantra. Rupa & Co. ISBN 978-8129121189.
- Gulzar (2013). Half a Rupee Stories. Penguin. ISBN 9780143068792.
- Gulzar (2013). Meelo Se Din. Rupa & Co. ISBN 978-8129120014.
- Gulzar (2014). Green Poems. Penguin Books India. ISBN 978-0143422822.
- Gulzar (2017). Suspected Poems. Penguin Books India. ISBN 978-0670089611.

Audiobooks

- Gulzar (2000). Rangeela Geedhad. Karadi Tales. ISBN 8186838422.
- Gulzar (2004). Parwaaz. Karadi Tales. ISBN 8181900413.

English novel

Two is Gulzar's debut novel released in English. It examines the status of refugees after partition. Two was originally written in Urdu.

Comics

Gulzar served as the Script Consultant for the Supremo comic book series by Pammi Bakshi.

Theatre

Chakkar Chalaaye Ghanchakkar

== Biographies ==
=== Books ===
- Kabir, Nasreen Munni (2018). Jiya Jale: The Stories of Songs. Speaking Tiger Books. ISBN 978-93-88070-95-9.
- Kabir, Nasreen Munni (2012). In the Company of a Poet. Rainlight Rupa. ISBN 978-81-291-2083-0.
- Chatterjee, Saibal (2007). Echoes and Eloquences. Rupa & Co. ISBN 978-81-291-1235-4.
- Gulzar, Meghna (2004). Because He is... Rupa & Co. ISBN 81-291-0364-8.

== See also ==
- List of Indian winners and nominees of the Academy Awards
- List of Indian poets
- List of Indian writers
