= Stories and Songs =

Stories and Songs may refer to:

- Stories & Songs (Mark Schultz album), 2003
- Stories & Songs (Jimmy Ibbotson album), 2000
- Stories and Songs (Franciscus Henri album), 1994
- Stories and Songs: The Adventures of Captain Feathersword the Friendly Pirate, a 1993 album from The Wiggles

== See also ==
- Songs & Stories, a 1991 LP by Dance House Children
- Jiya Jale: The Stories of Songs, 2018 book by Nasreen Munni Kabir about Indian lyricist Gulzar
