= Kanoon Ki Awaaz =

Kaanoon Ki Awaaz
- Directed by: R. Kumar
- Produced by: P. Chandrasekhara Reddy
- Starring: Shatrughan Sinha; Jaya Prada
- Music by: Jagjit Singh
- Release date: 1989
- Country: India
- Language: Hindi

Kaanoon Ki Awaaz is a 1989 Bollywood film directed by R. Kumar and starring Shatrughan Sinha, Jaya Prada in lead roles.

== Cast ==
- Shatrughan Sinha as Raghunath Prasad Rai
- Jaya Prada as Advocate / Judge Janki Rai
- Prem Chopra as Darshan Lal
- Aruna Irani as Havaldar Mrs. Banarasi
- Manik Irani as Havaldar Mr. Banarasi
- Asrani as Havaldar Bhoja Banarasi
- Shekhar Suman
- Menaka Babbar as Advocate Reshmi Mishra
- Bob Christo
- Leena Das
- Manmauji
- Gurbachan Singh

== Soundtrack ==
Song	Singer
"Sajan Mere Sajan"	Kumar Sanu, Chitra Singh
"Sindoor Ki Hove"	Lata Mangeshkar
"Aankhon Hi Aankhon Mein"	Asha Bhosle
"Peer Hundi Oye"	Shubha Joshi
