= Aaj (film) =

1987 Indian film directed by Mahesh Bhatt

- Directed by: Mahesh Bhatt
- Screenplay by: Sujit Kumar
- Story by: Anu Rita Pal
- Produced by: Kuljeet Pal; Mukesh Bhatt
- Starring: Smita Patil; Kumar Gaurav; Raj Babbar; Raj Kiran
- Cinematography: Pravin Bhatt
- Music by: Jagjit Singh, Chitra Singh
- Production company: Vishesh Films
- Release date: 27 November 1987 (India)
- Country: India
- Language: Hindi

Aaj (transl. Today) is a 1987 Indian Hindi-language film, directed by Mahesh Bhatt and produced by Kuljeet Pal. It stars Raj Babbar, Smita Patil, Kumar Gaurav, Marc Zuber, Anamika Pal and a then unknown Akshay Kumar in a small role. The film featured songs written by the Hindi poets Sudarshan Faakir and Madan Pal. Akshay Kumar made his first on screen appearance in the film under his birth name 'Rajiv Hari Om Bhatia', in a small role as a Karate Instructor. Kumar further stated that he later chose his official stage name Akshay Kumar, after actor Kumar Gaurav's character name in this film.

== Story ==
Akshay (Kumar Gaurav) is a young man, whose sister has been missing for a long time. Akshay often wanders around on the streets looking for her. One day he meets and befriends a girl named Anjali Bakshi (Anamika Pal), who helps him with his search for his sister. The movie traces their search and the twists that their own lives take during this search.

Aaj is about Anjali Bakshi, an independent natured, head-strong daughter of a rich industrialist, who leaves no stone unturned to see her happy always. Her father Arun is not very pleased to see his daughter enjoy her job of Rs. 600/- a month as a reporter with News of India. At the local police station where she goes to investigate, Anjali meets Akshay, a young boy with a low IQ, looking for his missing elder sister, Kavita. Akshay is not capable of doing anything except deliver flowers for a florist. Anjali gets interested in finding out more about Akshay's sister and Akshay clings to her for moral and emotional support. When researching for a feature on missing persons, Anjali unfolds a story closely linked with her family, and she is left with no choice but to rebel. Anjali is already engaged to be married to Sumit, who is not keen to have Akshay around. Sumit and his father who is a doctor, try their best to keep Akshay away from their lives. They seem to know a family secret.

== Cast ==
- Smita Patil as Kavita
- Kumar Gaurav as Akshay
- Raj Babbar as Press Editor Raj
- Raj Kiran as Sumit
- Marc Zuber as Arun Bakshi
- Anamika Pal as Anjali Bakshi
- Ila Arun as Bharti Bakshi
- Suresh Chatwal as Inspector Ghorpade
- Yusuf as Hitman
- Haidar Ali as Dr. J. J. Khosla
- Akshay Kumar as Karate Instructor

== Soundtrack ==
No.	Title	Singer(s)
1	"Phir Aaj Mujhe" lyricist by Sudarshan Faakir	Jagjit Singh
2	"Rishta Yeh kaisa Hai" lyricist by Madan Pal	Chitra Singh
3	"Woh Kagaz Ki Kashti" lyricist by Sudarshan Faakir	Jagjit Singh
4	"Zindagi Roz Naye Rang Main" lyrics by Madan Pal	Jagjit Singh, Chitra Singh, Vinod sehgal, Ghanshyam veswani, Ashok, Junid Akhtar
