= Jiya Jale: The Stories of Songs =

2018 book by Nasreen Munni Kabir

- Author: Nasreen Munni Kabir
- Language: English
- Subject: Gulzar
- Published: 10 November 2018
- Publisher: Speaking Tiger Books
- Publication place: India
- Media type: Print
- Pages: 200
- ISBN: 978-93-88070-95-9
- OCLC: 1080554601

Jiya Jale: The Stories of Songs is a book by the author and television documentary producer Nasreen Munni Kabir, containing her conversations with Gulzar (an Indian filmmaker, lyricist, and poet) taking place from early 2017 to April 2018. Her second book on the same subject after In the Company of a Poet in 2012, it details the development of several of his songs and features their English translations. The book was published by Speaking Tiger Books on 10 November 2018 and acclaimed by critics for its contents and format.

Kabir got the idea in 2016 when she was asked by the filmmaker Mani Ratnam to translate the dialogues from his 1998 Hindi-language romantic drama Dil Se..'s restored print to English. When she started working on the lyrics of the film's songs, she decided to meet the writer, Gulzar so she could get helps from him to guide her in the translation. Feeling it would be interesting if he could give more details about how he worked in lyrical composition, Kabir met him once more with the idea, which he agreed immediately. The book was done with fifteen 2 1/2-hour sessions of their discussions, while she was in London and he was in Mumbai.

== Summary ==
Jiya Jale: The Stories of Songs opens with the making of "Jiya Jale", a song from the romantic drama Dil Se.. (1998). Its lyrical writer, Gulzar, told the book's author Nasreen Munni Kabir about how he and the film's music director A. R. Rahman approached Lata Mangeshkar to sing it. Gulzar also talks on why he makes the chorus in Malayalam while the main lyrics are in Hindi; the book follows it by featuring the English translation of the entire song. The Stories of Songs also examines development for more than 40 of his songs—which Kabir considered to be memorable—from the 1960s to the 2010s as well as their translations in English and their critical analysis, such as "Mera Kuchh Saamaan" (from the 1987 film Ijaazat), "Chaiyya Chaiyya" (also from Dil Se..), "Kajra Re" (from the 2005 film Bunty Aur Babli), and "Jai Ho" (from the 2008 film Slumdog Millionaire).

== Development and writing ==
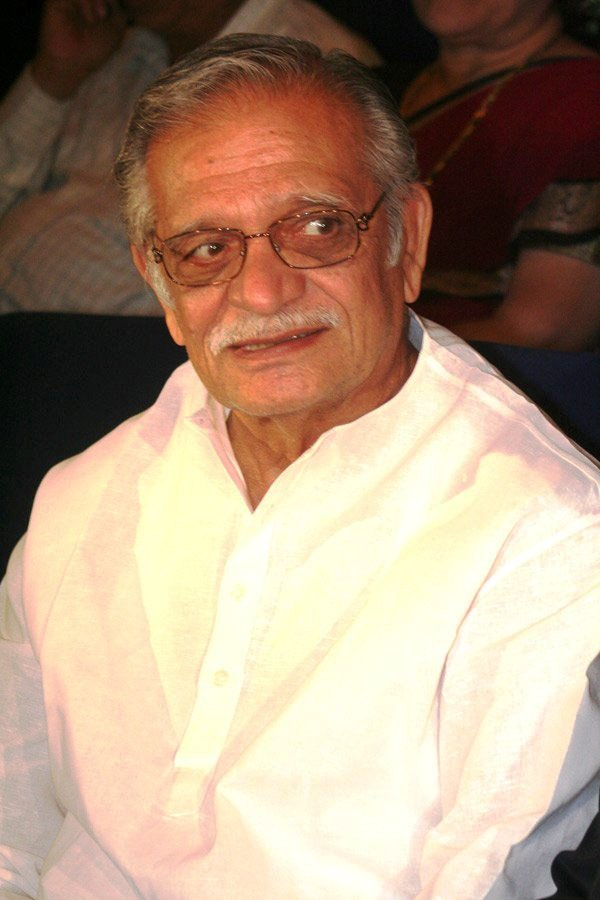
This marked Nasreen Munni Kabir's second book on Gulzar (pictured in 2008) after the 2012 biography In the Company of a Poet

Kabir came up with The Stories of Songs' ideas in early December 2016, when the filmmaker Mani Ratnam asked her to provide English subtitles for the restored print of his 1998 film Dil Se... Having subtitled for more than 500 films at the time, Kabir called the occupation challenging—especially on the songs. She said many forms of translations could be made but only one that is original, leading her to a meeting with Gulzar: "I thought it would be hugely instructive if Gulzar saab (boss), who had written the lyrics, could guide me in conveying the essence of his words." The rendezvous took place at his house in Mumbai, and the first song they worked on was "Chaiyya Chaiyya"; she said most translations she found on the Internet to be mediocre and disappointing. They finished translating all the film's songs in two hours.

The "Chaiyya Chaiyya" translation result was later published by The Hindu in its 18 January 2017 issue with the title of "Decoding the same ol' feeling in new words". In the article, she also expressed her commendation on the direction, the music, the lyrics, the performances from the actors, the cinematography, the choreography, and the playback singings. According to Kabir, this motivated her to know more about how song lyrics are made from the perspectives of the lyricists themselves. Kabir told Gulzar about the project and immediately got his approval; this became her second book on him after that of In the Company of a Poet (2012). While In the Company of a Poet is about Gulzar's life and career entirely, The Stories of Songs specifically focuses on how he lyricised songs that are considered to be memorable by Kabir.

They had online conversations from early 2017 to April 2018, while he was in Mumbai and she was in London. Finished within fifteen sessions, she estimated that each took at least 2 1/2 hours. While translating his songs, Kabir avoided rhyming the lyrics in English—believing that it "invariably leads to introducing new imagery into the lyrics". She recounted that, after the manuscript was being ready, they checked it for several times "to get the flow right and to make sure the book accurately captured the essence of our talks". Ravi Singh of Speaking Tiger Books released the book on Amazon Kindle, hardcover, and paperback on 10 November 2018.

== Critical reception ==
After being released, the book was critically praised for its focus on the topics and its question-and-answer format. Some of the reviewers also commended Kabir's English translation of Gulzar's songs and her effort to fill the book with new insights on his career. Manjula Narayan, who wrote for the Hindustan Times newspaper, called it an "excellent book that treats the Hindi film song with the seriousness and respect it deserves", adding that it marked the arrival of a new book genre—"the Hindi film songbook that combines anecdote, line translations, and serious discussion on craft and song vocabulary". Sumit Paul from The Free Press Journal took note of the book's format and appreciated Kabir for making such a magnificent work. Paul opined, "The whole narration ... bring out the honesty of Gulzar, who has been a witness to the very best in the past and has also seen the growing mediocrity in the tinsel-town. After reading this book, a discerning reader concludes that Gulzar is full of optimism. Never does one find even a streak of cynicism in him."

Deccan Herald's Latha Venkatraman called The Stories of Songs easy to understand and thought that it could be re-read for several times. She concluded, "For lovers of Hindi film music, especially those with a discerning interest in good poetry, this book is a must-read". Writing for The Tribune, Renu Sid Sinha shared similar thoughts, recommending it for Gulzar's fans and those who are interested in Bollywood and explaining that she "has endeavoured to provide a novel understanding and backdrop to the Indian film song. The book, quite like the man himself, is great repository of anecdotes about Hindi films and music." Jai Arjun Singh of the India Today magazine summarised, "It's a daunting canvas, and for her slim book of conversations with the writer-filmmaker about his songs, Nasreen Munni Kabir took a pragmatic approach: rather than trying to be comprehensive, she focused on a few iconic songs through the decades, and allowed the conversation to take detours."

== Publication history ==
Publication history of Jiya Jale: The Stories of Songs
| Region | Release date | Format | Publisher | Ref. |
|---|---|---|---|---|
| India | 10 November 2018 | Amazon Kindle | Speaking Tiger Books | |
| India | 10 November 2018 | Hardcover | Speaking Tiger Books | |
| India | 10 November 2018 | Paperback | Speaking Tiger Books | |

== Sources ==
- "Essential harmony". Pune Mirror. 22 November 2018. Archived from the original on 11 August 2021.
- Kabir, Nasreen Munni (18 January 2017). "Decoding the same ol' feeling in new words". The Hindu. Archived from the original on 9 August 2021.
- Kabir, Nasreen Munni (10 November 2018a). Jiya Jale. Speaking Tiger Books. ASIN B07KM485CJ.
- Kabir, Nasreen Munni (10 November 2018b). Jiya Jale. Speaking Tiger Books. ISBN 978-93-88070-95-9.
- Kabir, Nasreen Munni (10 November 2018c). Jiya Jale. Speaking Tiger Books. ISBN 978-93-88070-97-3.
- Narayan, Manjula (15 December 2018). "Review: Jiya Jale; Gulzar in conversation with Nasreen Munni Kabir". Hindustan Times. Archived from the original on 8 August 2021.
- Paul, Sumit (29 May 2019). "Jiya Jale, The Stories of Songs by Nasreen Munni Kabir: Review". The Free Press Journal. Archived from the original on 8 August 2021.
- Singh, Jai Arjun (18 January 2019). "Poet of the screen". India Today. Archived from the original on 8 August 2021.
- Sinha, Renu Sud (13 January 2019). "Song(s) of the renaissance man". The Tribune. Archived from the original on 8 August 2021.
- Venkatraman, Latha (17 March 2019). "Poetry through songs". Deccan Herald. Archived from the original on 8 August 2021.
