= Sudarshan Faakir =

Indian Urdu poet and lyricist (1934–2008)

- سدرشن فاکر
- Born: 1934; Jalandhar, Punjab, British India
- Died: 19 February 2008 (aged 73–74); Jalandhar, Punjab, India
- Occupations: Poet, lyricist

Sudarshan Faakir (19 December 1934 - 19 February 2008), better known by his takhallus Faakir, was an Indian Urdu poet and lyricist. His ghazals and nazms were sung by Begum Akhtar and Jagjit Singh. His son Manav Faakir is a Music Composer & lyricist.

== Early life ==
Sudarshan Faakir was born in Jalandhar in British Punjab in 1934. After completing high school, he moved to Jalandhar and completed B.A. from DAV College. During college, he was very active in dramatics and poetry.

He studied MA in political science and English from DAV College, Jalandhar. Active in dramatics and poetry right from his college days, he directed Mohan Rakesh’s play "Ashadh Ka Ek Din" in his youth.

He lent his voice to AIR, Jalandhar before he left for Bombay where he later wrote for music directorJaidev. His song ‘Zindagi, zindagi, mere ghar aana zindagi' from Bhim Sen’s 1979 film ‘Dooriyan’ as well as dialogues for the film ‘Yalgaar’ are popular till date. It is also claimed that the song, "Hum sab Bhartiya hain", which is sung at the NCC camps across the country, was penned by him.

== Career ==
Faakir belonged to the small and diminishing tribe of non-Muslim Urdu poets from East Punjab. Sudarshan Faakir is the first lyricist to have won a Filmfare Award for his very first song. Apart from the hits like Woh Kagaz Ki Kashti, he was famous for a religious number - Hey Ram... Hey Ram. He is the Writer of National NCC Song of India- Hum Sab Bhartiya Hain. Apart from Non-Film Music, Sudarshan Faakir has Penned Songs from various films also.

Sudarshan ‘Faakir’ was the favourite poet of ‘Mallika-e-ghazal’ Begum Akhtar in her last phase, She sang five of his ghazals. He was also the co-traveller of Jagjit Singh, an association that began with ‘Woh kagaz ki kishti, woh barish ka pani’ in 1982.

A perfectionist to the core, he laboured hard over his poetry. Faakir is perhaps one of the last of the tribe of vanishing poets who lived for poetry and it is noteworthy that he put together his poetry in an anthology and published his first ‘diwan’ only after he became a much-celebrated poet.

Sudarshan died on 18 February 2008, at a hospital in Jalandhar, at the age of 73, after a prolonged illness. He was cremated at Model town.

== Personal life and death ==
Sudarshan was married to Sudesh. The couple have a son Manav Faakir in Bollywood as Lyricist. He died in Jalandhar on 18 February 2008.

== Compositions ==
1. Agar ham kahe aur vo muskuraa
2. Teri Ankhon Mein Hamne Kya Dekha
3. Gam bade aate hain kaatil kii nigaahon kii tarah
4. Mere dukh kii koiii davaa na karo
5. Shaayad main zindagii kii sahar leke aa gayaa
6. Ye daulat bhi le lo, ye shoharat bhii le lo (used in the 1987 Hindi film Aaj)
7. Zindagii zindagii mere ghar aanaa, aanaa zindagi (used in the 1979 Hindi film Dooriyan)
8. Ho jaata hai kaise pyaar, na jaane koi (used in the 1992 Hindi film Yalgaar)
9. Bezubaani Zubaan Na Ho Jaaye (non-film)
10. Phir Aaj Mujhe Tumko Bas Itna Batana Hai (used in the 1987 Hindi film Aaj )
11. Zindagi Men Jab Tumhaare Gam Nahin The (used in the 1979 Hindi film Dooriyan)
12. Zindagi tujhko jiya hai koi afsos nahin, zahar khud maine piya hai koi afsos nahin
13. Shaayad Main Zindagi Ki Sahar Leke Aa Gayaa
14. Patthar ke khuda, patthar ke sanam Apanon Ke Sitam Ham Se Bataae Nahin Jaate
15. Aaj Ke Daur Me Ae Dost Ye Manzar Kyu Hai
16. "Barsaat Ke Mausam Mein" from Naajayaz[1995]
