= Sajda =

Sajda - An Offering of Ghazals.

Studio album by Jagjit Singh and Lata Mangeshkar
- Released: 1991
- Label: His Master's Voice
- Producer: Jagjit Singh

Sajda is a Ghazal album released by His Master's Voice and jointly collaborated by Jagjit Singh and Lata Mangeshkar. This album was released in 1991 shortly after the demise of Jagjit Singh's son Vivek. This album was released as a double album consisting of 16 tracks which was released in Compact Cassette and Compact Disc form.

== Ghazal tracks in Sajda ==
1. Dard Se Mera Daaman Bharde Ya Allah
2. Kabhi Yun Bhi Aa Meri Aankh Mein
3. Meri Tasveer Mein Rang Aur Kisika To Nahin
4. Gham Ka Khazana Tera Bhi Hai Mera Bhi
5. Kisko Qatil Main Kahoon
6. Tere Jalwe Ab Mujhe
7. Dhoop Mein Niklo Ghataon Mein Nahakar Dekho
8. Allah Jaanta Hai
9. Dhuan Banake Fiza Mein Uda Diya Mujhko
10. Mili Hawaon Mein Udne Ki Woh Saza Yaaro
11. Dil Mein Ab Dard-E-Mohabbat Ke Siva Kuchh Bhi Nahin
12. Mausam Ko Isharon Se Bula Kyon Nahin Lete
13. Tujhse Milne Ki Saza Denge
14. Har Taraf Har Jagah Beshumar Aadmi
15. Dil Hi Toh Hai
16. Aankh Se Door Na Ho
