= Pandori, Jalandhar =

Pandori
- Village
- Location in Punjab, India Pandori (India)
- Coordinates: 31.2490°N 75.8331°E
- Country: India
- State: Punjab
- District: Jalandhar

Languages
  - Official: Punjabi
- Time zone: UTC+5:30 (IST)
- PIN
- Vehicle registration: PB- 09

Pandori is a village in the Punjab state of India. It is located near the city of Sultanpur Lodhi in Kapurthala district. Pandori lies on the Sultanpur Lodhi – Phatu Dhinga road. The nearest railway station to Pandori is the Sultanpur railway station, which is 8 km (5.0 mi) away. Pandori's post code is 144401.

== See also ==
- Ratan Pandoravi
