= Triveni (poetry) =

- Author: Gulzar
- Language: Hindi
- Subject: Poetry
- Genre: Poetry
- Publisher: Rupa & Co.
- Publication date: 2005
- Publication place: India
- Media type: Paperback
- ISBN: 9788171675128
- OCLC: 470425235

Triveni is a form of Hindi/Urdu poetry initiated by the poet Gulzar. Unlike sher, a triveni consists of three "hemistichs" (misras). The first two are complete in themselves but the addition of the third misra gives a new dimension.

Rupa & Co. has published his poetry book Triveni. Sony Music has just released an album Koi Baat Chale which has a few of Gulzar's triveni sung by Jagjit Singh.

== Example ==
A beautiful example of Gulzar's Triveni:

ज़ुल्फ़ में यूँ चमक रही है बूँद
जैसे बेरी में तनहा एक जुगनू
क्या बुरा है जो छत टपकती है

Transliteration

Zulf mein yun chamak rahi hai boond,
Jaise beree mein tanhaa ik jugnoo
kyaa buraa hai jo chhat tapaktee hai !!

Translation

The (water) glitters so in (your) hair
As a lone firefly in (a) bush
What's so bad if the roof drips

The addition of the third line implies that the water drop in the hair is due to a dripping roof and since it creates a visage of such beauty, the poet is unperturbed by it.
