= Kahkashan =

Indian television series

- Directed by: Jalal Agha
- Starring: see below
- Opening theme: "Kahkashan" by Jagjit Singh
- Country of origin: India
- Original language: Hindi
- No. of episodes: Total 18

Production
- Producer: Ali Sardar Jafri
- Running time: approx. 25 minutes

Original release
- Network: DD National
- Release: 1991 – 1992

Kahkashan is an Indian television series about seven great masters of modern Urdu poetry: Hasrat Mohani, Jigar Moradabadi, Josh Malihabadi, Majaz Lucknawi, Firaq Gorakhpuri, Faiz Ahmad Faiz, and Makhdoom Mohiuddin. The serial was produced by Ali Sardar Jafri, who also wrote and scripted it. Directed by Jalal Agha, the show was telecast from 1991 to 1992.

Music was scored by Jagjit Singh, the famous ghazal singer of India. The series was also shown on TV Asia channel USA in 2006.

== Overview ==
It was Sardar Jafri's dream to make such a serial on Urdu writers as a tribute and also with the intent to popularize and expose the general Indian audience to the modern masters of Urdu poetry. The series was telecast in eighteen episodes in 1991–1992.

== Cast ==
- Parikshit Sahni as Josh Malihabadi
- Farooq Sheikh as Hasrat Mohani
- Deepti Naval
- Irfan Khan as Makhdoom Mohiuddin
- Raj Zutshi as Jigar Moradabadi
- Tanvi Azmi
- Rakesh Pandey as Majaz
- Manohar Singh as Firaq Gorakhpuri
- Fawad Sherani
- Tom Alter
- Amar Ghaffar
