= Mirza Ghalib (TV series) =

- Also known as: Mirza Galib
- Genre: Historical drama
- Written by: Gulzar
- Directed by: Gulzar
- Starring: Naseeruddin Shah; Tanvi Azmi; Neena Gupta
- Composers: Jagjit Singh & Chitra Singh
- Country of origin: India
- Original language: Urdu
- No. of seasons: 1

Production
- Producer: Gulzar

Original release
- Network: DD National
- Release: 1988

Mirza Ghalib is an Indian Historical drama television drama series written and produced by poet Gulzar. The series was aired on Doordarshan National in 1988. Naseeruddin Shah played the role of Mirza Ghalib, the famous classical Urdu and Persian poet from Mughal Empire during British colonial rule. The series featured ghazals sung and composed by Jagjit Singh and Chitra Singh.

== Cast ==
- Naseeruddin Shah as Mirza Ghalib
- Tanvi Azmi as Umrao Begum
- Neena Gupta - Nawab Jaan
- Shafi Inamdar as Sheikh Mohammad Ibrahim Zauq
- Sudhir Dalvi as Bahadur Shah Zafar
- Parikshit Sahni as Nawab Shams-ud-Din
- Javed Khan Amrohi as Fakir
- Mac Mohan as Nawab Jaan's servant

== Music ==
It included music and narration. The songs were sung by Jagjit Singh and Chitra Singh and narration by Gulzar.

List of Ghazals included in the TV Series

1. Dil hi to hai
2. Koi din gar zindagaani aur hai
3. Hazaaron khawahishein aisi
4. Har aik baat pe kehte ho tum
5. Bazeecha-e-atfal hai duniya mere aage
6. Aah ko chahiye ek umr
7. Hain aur bhi dunya mein
8. Ishq mujh ko nahin
9. Yeh na thi hamari qismat
10. Kisi ko de ke dil koi
