= Potli Baba Ki =

- Written by: Gulzar
- Directed by: Gulzar
- Opening theme: Aaya Re Baba
- Original language: Hindi
- No. of episodes: 20

Production
- Cinematography: Soumendu Roy

Original release
- Network: DD National
- Release: 1991

Potli Baba Ki (literally Baba's Bag, can be inferred as Baba's Tales) (1991) is an Indian children's puppet television series aired in India in 1991 on Doordarshan. It featured various fairy tales in simple language and used to give good moral messages to children. The title song "Aaya Re Baba" was sung by Vinod Sehgal and composed by Hindustani the poet and lyricist Gulzar, who was also the co-producer, director and writer of the show.

The series has two parts: "Ali Baba and the Forty Thieves" (ten episodes) and "Aladdin and the Magic Lamp" (ten episodes).

== Synopsis ==
The series has a story-teller in the form of an old man called as 'Baba' — who in his 'Potli' has various stories. The old story-teller, Chhenu ki Jhunnu ka Baba, living in Ghungar village, collects stories and fables which his mother has left hidden under rocks. Baba's peculiarity is that is growing younger day-by-day and once he will find all the stories he will be a child.
