= Ratan Pandoravi =

Indian poet and scholar (1907–1990)

Ratan Pandoravi رتن پنڈوروی
- Born: Rala Ram; 7 July 1907; Pandori, Kapurthala State, British India
- Died: 4 November 1990 (aged 83); Pathankot, Punjab, India
- Occupation: Darvish (Sufi aspirant)
- Known for: Nazms, Ghazals, Criticism, Historian, Translator

Rattan Pandoravi (Urdu: رتن پنڈوروی) as pen name born Rala Ram (Urdu: رالا رام) 7 July 1907 – 4 November 1990, was an Urdu poet and scholar from India.

== Biography ==
=== Early life ===
Rattan Pandoravi was born on 7 July 1907 in Pandori, District Kapurthala, India. He obtained his Munshi Fazil منشی فاضل and Adeeb Fazil ادیب فاضل diploma in Arabic and Persian. As an Urdu poet he firstly consulted Dil Shahjahanpuri, the renowned disciple of Amir Meenai, but later Josh Malsiyani became his mentor.

== Career ==
He has written several books of poetry collection, in which he speaks about the eternal sublime beauty that gives the entire universe its form, shape and cognisance, and the limitless universal love that keeps it firmly bound. The comprehensive appraisal of his life and works that has been published is Fars - i – nazar:Pandit Ratan Pandorvi ki dilkas nazmiyat.

== Bibliography ==
- Bahisht e Nazar
- Andaz e Nazar
- Rubaiyyat e Ratan
- Tahqiqi mabahis (1988)
- Hindi ke Musalman Shoara (1982)
- Sarmayah balaghat (1983)
- Sirre e Maghfarat translation of Bhagvad Gita (1987)

== See also ==
- List of Urdu language poets
