= Libaas =

- Movie Poster
- Directed by: Gulzar
- Written by: Gulzar
- Based on: Seema by Gulzar
- Produced by: Vikas Mohan
- Starring: Shabana Azmi; Naseeruddin Shah; Raj Babbar; Sushma Seth; Utpal Dutt
- Music by: R. D. Burman
- Release date: 1988
- Running time: 137 minutes
- Country: India
- Language: Hindi

Libaas (lit. 'clothing') is a 1988 Hindi drama film, written and directed by Gulzar. The film based on the short story Seema, published in collected stories in Raavi Paar. It is about married couples of urban India having extramarital relations and adultery. The film won critical acclaim in international film festivals, but has not been released in India to date. There had been only two public screening of Libaas in India, at the 23rd and 45th International Film Festival of India, in 1992 and 2014 respectively.

Azmi notably won the Best Actress Award at the 1992 Pyongyang International Film Festival.

== Synopsis ==
The story is based on Seema, a short story penned by Gulzar. Seema was married to a theatre artiste named Sudhir. Sudhir was a humorless workaholic, and Seema felt ignored and dissatisfied. She fell in love with Sudhir's vivacious friend T.K., and left her husband to marry him. However, she had lingering feelings for Sudhir. One day, Seema learns that Sudhir is unwell and impulsively visits her old home. The story ends when Seema hears a lady's laughter with Sudhir and quietly leaves.

== Cast ==
- Shabana Azmi as Seema Bhardwaj
- Naseeruddin Shah as Sudhir Bhardwaj
- Raj Babbar as T. K., Sudhir's friend
- Sushma Seth
- Utpal Dutt
- Annu Kapoor

== Soundtrack ==
The music was by R. D. Burman, with lyrics by Gulzar.

Song	Singer
"Phir Kisi Shakh Ne"	Lata Mangeshkar
"Sili Hawa Chhoo Gayi"	Lata Mangeshkar
"Kya Bura Hai, Kya Bhala, Ho Sake To Jala Dil Jala"	Lata Mangeshkar, R. D. Burman
"Khamosh Sa Afsana Pani Se Likha Hota"	Lata Mangeshkar, Suresh Wadkar
