= Hello Zindagi =

Social documenting series aired in 1995

Hello Zindagi (translation: Hello Life) is a social documenting series aired on Doordarshan in 1995 produced and anchored by Nalini Singh.

The format of the show was to show instances from people in real life on the week's topic, where the topics comprised a varied range from - notion of beauty, communication in Indian families, importance of marriage, child adoption, etc.

The topics would be introduced by Nalini Singh, interspersed with scenes and interviews done with people influenced or affected by it.

The title song of the show, sung by Jagjit Singh with lyrics by Gulzar - Hai lau zindagi, zindagi noor hai is a very popular ghazal.
