= In the Company of a Poet =

Book by Nasreen Munni Kabir

- Author: Nasreen Munni Kabir
- Language: English
- Subject: Gulzar
- Genre: Biography
- Published: 12 November 2012
- Publisher: Rupa Publications
- Publication place: India
- Media type: Print
- Pages: 208
- ISBN: 978-81-29120-83-0
- OCLC: 827489917

In the Company of a Poet is a 2012 book by the author and television documentary producer Nasreen Munni Kabir, containing her interview with Gulzar (an Indian filmmaker, lyricist, and poet). It details his early life, including his birth in 1934 in Dina, British India (now Pakistan), and his Sikh family background, his film and poetic career, and his marriage to the actress Rakhee in 1973, with whom he has a daughter, Meghna. In the Company of a Poet was published by Rupa Publications on 12 November 2012 and received mixed reviews from critics. Firstpost included the book in its listing of the Top 10 in Indian Non-fiction Books.

The book became the third written work on Gulzar, following his daughter's Because He is... (2004) and journalist Saibal Chatterjee's Echoes & Eloquences (2007). Kabir and Gulzar mainly discussed the latter's experiences as a lyricist, poet, and screenwriter, keeping their conversations focused on topics that their previous publications have done. The development of In the Company of a Poet was conducted through online discussions on the telecommunication application Skype between May and November 2011, followed by face-to-face conversations at the end of the same year.

== Synopsis ==
In the Company of a Poet features extensive conversations between its author, Nasreen Munni Kabir, and the filmmaker, lyricist, and poet Gulzar, relating to his life and career. Gulzar was born into a Sikh family as Sampooran Singh Kalra on 18 August 1934, in Dina, British India (now Pakistan). His father, Makhan Singh Kalra, was a Sardar and had married thrice (having a son and two daughters from a first marriage with Raaj) before his marriage to who later became Gulzar's mother, Sujaan Kaur. Gulzar said to Kabir that he is Kaur's only child, as his mother died several months after giving birth. The book later extensively chronicles his Bollywood cinematic—mostly that of lyricist—and Urdu-language poetic career. He particularly speaks about his poetry, noting that he wrote his first poem when he was ten and later began a career as a poet. In 1973, Gulzar married actress Raakhee, with whom he has a daughter named Meghna (who would also become a filmmaker).

== Development and writing ==
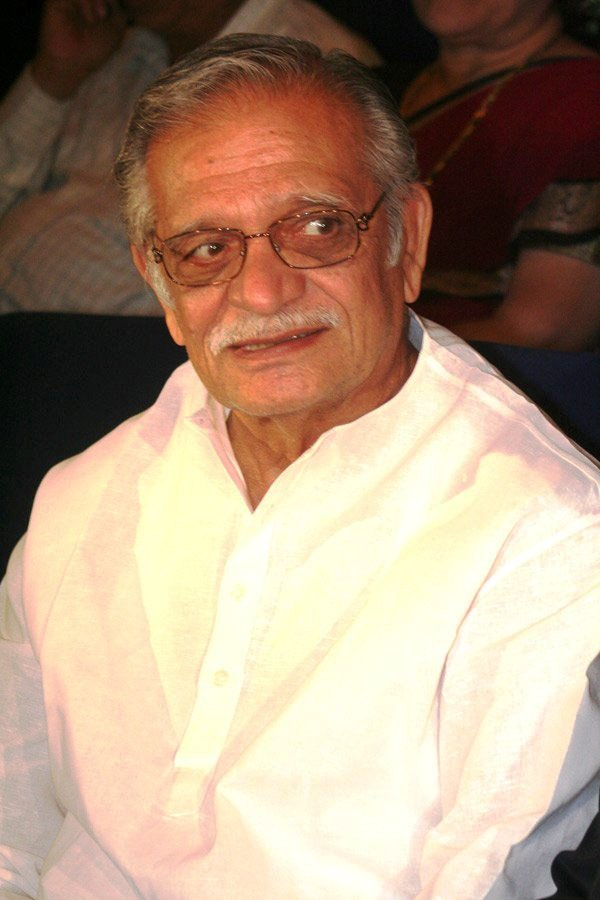
Gulzar's (pictured in 2008) first meeting with Nasreen Munni Kabir occurred in 1986, during the production of the latter's television documentary Movie Mahal

In 1986, during the production of Movie Mahal (a 49-part television documentary on Bollywood aired on Channel 4), Kabir asked for journalist Khalid Mohamed's help to invite people with "significant" contributions to Bollywood. One of the interviewees was Gulzar, with whom she discussed the history of Bollywood's lyricists. After agreeing to the offers, Mohamed and Kabir arrived at his one-story bungalow on Pali Hill, Mumbai, to start shooting. Their second meeting was four years later, when she was producing another documentary for the same channel, on playback singer Lata Mangeshkar. Kabir recounted that Gulzar provided insightful information about the singer, just as he had when interviewed about topics from their previous meetings. In later years, they would meet only at film festivals and private screenings.

Kabir wrote in In the Company of a Poet's foreword that she got the idea of the book "[preposterously] as this might sound" after having a dream in 2010, in which she was talking with Gulzar's contemporaries Sahir Ludhianvi and Shailendra; the lyricists told her to write a book in collaboration with Gulzar on their work. It consequently motivated her to make a call with Gulzar from London, "no matter how overly dramatic the whole thing might seem to him," using the telephone number she got when they met coincidentally in the city. His manager, whom she referred to as Mr. Kutty, answered the call and asked her to wait for a while. Gulzar came on the line a few minutes later, telling Kabir to phone him once more after she arrives in India. In late 2010, she returned to the country and subsequently received his approval.

Using the telecommunication application Skype, conversations took place from May to November 2011, with over twenty-five sessions (each lasting around one to two hours) in English, Hindi, and Urdu. Two other books have been written on him—his daughter Meghna's Because He is... (2004) and Saibal Chatterjee's Echoes & Eloquences (2007). They avoid discussing topics that the previous publications have already done. Kabir, who had returned to London by the end of 2010 following Gulzar's consent on the idea of the book, chose to focus mostly on his work as a lyricist, poet, and screenwriter. She added, "I also believed that even if we were to revisit events that were already known, [Gulzar] would shed new light on them from the perspective of who he is today." At the end of the following year, she went back to Mumbai and continued the conversations at Gulzar's office.

== Critical reception ==
In the Company of a Poet received mixed reviews from book critics. Bollywood Hungama gave the book a rating of two-and-a-half stars, concluding in its review, "If you haven't read any of the books centered on Gulzar yet, this one—though not the best of the lot—could still be your pick!" Although feeling ambivalent about the book, the critic said that it is suitable for those who want to have insights into Bollywood in the past decades from Gulzar's point of view. Lopamudra Ghatak of News18 praised Kabir for encouraging Gulzar to tell his personal life detailly and described the book as "a conversation with Kabir interrupting, interjecting and engaging her subject just enough, at the right moments". The Hindustan Times' journalist Deepa Gahlot believed that it gives "a glimpse of where he comes from and the influences that shaped his extraordinary imagination and felicity with words."

Suresh Kohli of The Tribune criticised the book for "[lacking] a pattern, therefore the relative inconsistency," explaining that Kabir "flips from films to individuals without a pause, from people to poetry with the finesse of a trapeze artiste." For instance, they were talking about his poem dedicated to Meghna when she was 18, but Kabir suddenly changed the topic to her birth. The New Indian Express complimented the book as interesting and filled with much new information on its subject. Writing for The Kashmir Walla, Atul K. Thakur stated, "Nasreen Munni Kabir, who is known for her authentic knowledge on cinema, has made another remarkable mark by infusing biographical elements in a long interview with a timeless phenomenon-Gulzar." The Deccan Herald noted that Gulzar discuss his life in a humorous way.

Ziya Us Salam found the book to be a "breezy reading." In The Indian Express, Suanshu Khurana felt that In the Company of a Poet has flawed narrative shifts and many questions from Kabir have little connection with her following questions. Khurana took an example when Gulzar was telling her the screenwriting of Mughal-e-Azam (1960) and its director K. Asif, but Kabir next asked about the author-cum-screenwriter Nabendu Ghosh—the critic opined these flaws could make the book's readers confused. Asif Noorani of Dawn commended Kabir's ability to "draw Gulzar into a lively conversation, enabling us to hear about many people, their fads and foibles," Jitesh Pillai, the editor of Filmfare, praised her for making such an "engaging book" with "delightful insights," and Ramya Sarma of The Hindu shared similar thoughts, appreciating it for its informativeness.

The book was included in Firstpost's end-of-year listing of the Top 10 in Indian Non-fiction Books.

== Publication history ==
Publication history of In the Company of a Poet
| Region | Release date | Format | Publisher | Ref. |
|---|---|---|---|---|
| India | 12 November 2012 | Amazon Kindle | Rupa Publications | |
| India | 12 November 2012 | Hardcover | Rupa Publications | |
| India | 1 December 2012 | Paperback | Rupa Publications | |

== Sources ==
- "Book Review – In the Company of a Poet – Gulzar". Bollywood Hungama. 21 January 2014. Archived from the original on 22 July 2021.
- "Book rack". Deccan Herald. 13 January 2013. Archived from the original on 21 January 2013.
- Gahlot, Deepa (29 June 2013). "The fabric of his life". Hindustan Times. Archived from the original on 22 July 2021.
- Ghatak, Lopamudra (4 February 2013). "'In the Company of a Poet' is a delightful read". News18. Archived from the original on 21 July 2021.
- Kabir, Nasreen Munni (12 November 2012). In the Company of a Poet. New Delhi, India: Rupa Publications. ASIN B015A9ZP5A.
- Kabir, Nasreen Munni (12 November 2012). In the Company of a Poet. New Delhi, India: Rupa Publications. ISBN 978-81-29120-83-0.
- Kabir, Nasreen Munni (1 December 2012). In the Company of a Poet. New Delhi, India: Rupa Publications. ISBN 978-81-29138-66-8.
- Kaul, Vivek (26 December 2012). "Top 10 in Indian non-fiction books: More reasons to skip Chetan Bhagat". Firstpost. Archived from the original on 2 October 2020.
- Khurana, Suanshu (23 February 2013). "Life in Verse". The Indian Express. Archived from the original on 22 July 2021.
- Kohli, Suresh (3 November 2013). "The spring sonata of a true poet". The Tribune. Archived from the original on 22 July 2021.
- Noorani, Asif (10 March 2013). "Review: A poet for all seasons". Dawn. Archived from the original on 22 July 2021.
- Pillai, Jitesh (25 January 2013). "Dil dhoondta hai..." Filmfare. Archived from the original on 22 July 2021.
- Salam, Ziya Us (4 January 2013). "Indelible memory". The Hindu. Archived from the original on 14 June 2014.
- Sarma, Ramya (1 April 2013). "Dreaming with eyes wide open". The Hindu. Archived from the original on 3 April 2013.
- "Talking life like a poem". The New Indian Express. 3 February 2013. Archived from the original on 22 July 2021.
- Thakur, Atul K. (27 January 2013). "Book Review: In the company of a poet". The Kashmir Walla. Archived from the original on 28 June 2021.
