= Speaking Tiger Books =

Indian publishing house

- Status: Active
- Founded: 2014
- Founder: Ravi Singh; Manas Saikia
- Country of origin: India
- Headquarters location: New Delhi, India
- Nonfiction topics: Memoir, sports, nature writing, travel writing
- Imprints: Talking Cub (Children's books)
- Official website: www.speakingtigerbooks.com

Speaking Tiger Books (informally Speaking Tiger) is an independent publishing and book distribution company based in New Delhi, India. It was founded in 2014 by Ravi Singh and Manas Saikia, former heads of Penguin India and Cambridge University Press India, respectively. The company focuses on maintaining a diversity of genres and publishes Indian and international literary fiction and non-fiction.
