= Jagjit Singh =

Indian singer (1941–2011)

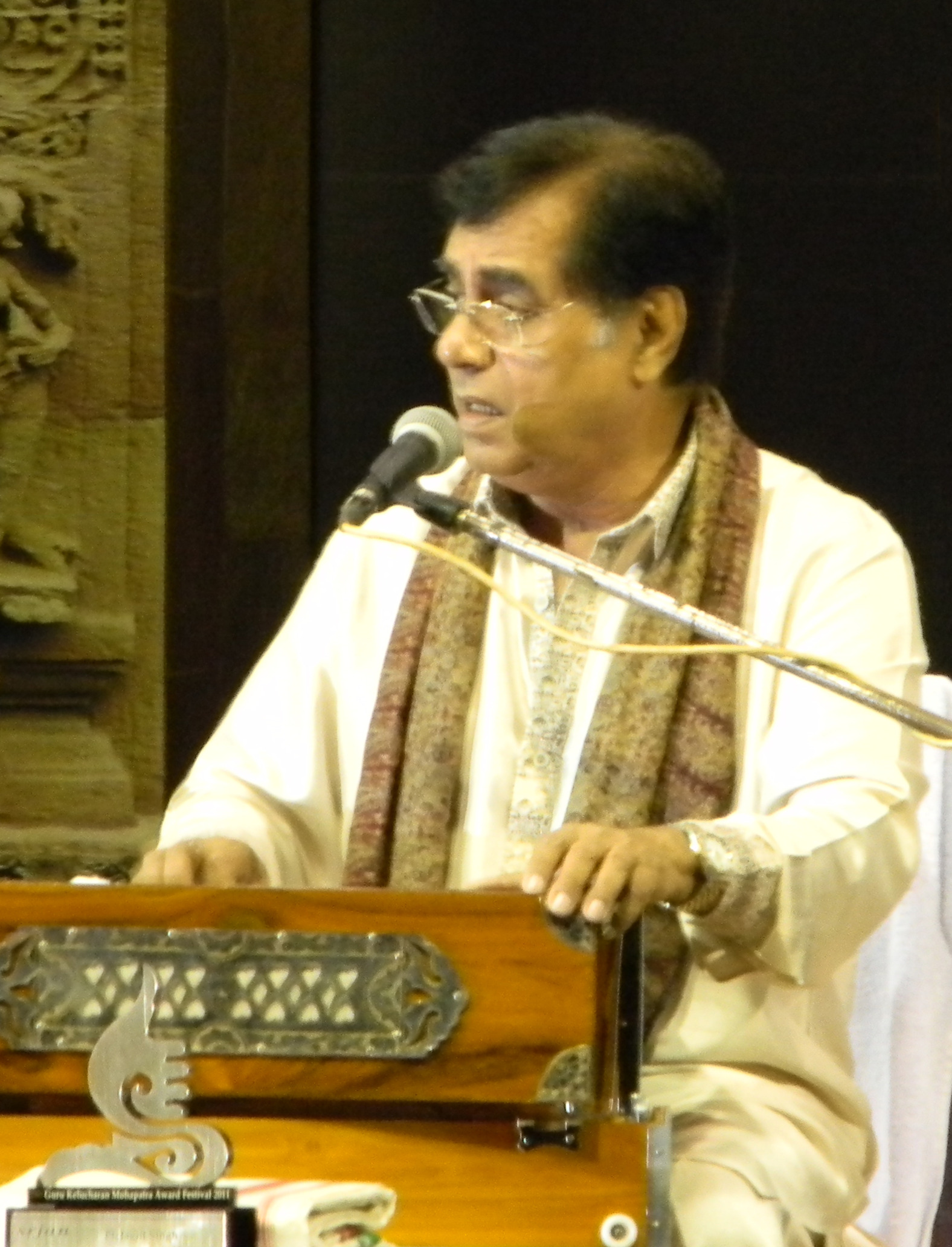
- Jagjit Singh performing at Rabindra Mandap, Bhubaneswar, on 7 September 2011
- Born: Jagmohan Singh Dhiman; 8 February 1941; Sri Ganganagar, Bikaner State, British India (present-day Rajasthan, India)
- Died: 10 October 2011 (aged 70); Mumbai, Maharashtra, India
- Occupations: Music director, composer, singer
- Spouse: Chitra Shome (m. 1969)
- Children: 2
- Musical career
- Genres: Ghazal, classical, devotional, folk, Bhajan
- Instruments: Vocals, harmonium, tanpura, piano, tabla
- Years active: 1960–2011
- Labels: EMI, His Master's Voice, Saregama, Universal, Sony BMG, CBS, Polydor, TIPS, Venus, T-Series, Magna Sound, Big, Times

Jagjit Singh (Punjabi: [ˈd͡ʒəgd͡ʒiːt sɪŋg]; born Jagmohan Singh Dhiman; 8 February 1941 – 10 October 2011) was an Indian composer, singer and musician. He composed and sang in numerous languages and is credited for the revival and popularity of ghazal, an Indian classical art form, by choosing poetry that was relevant to the masses and composing them in a way that laid more emphasis on the meaning of words and melody evoked by them. In terms of Indian classical music, his style of composing and gayaki (singing) is considered as Bol-pradhan, one that lays emphasis on words. He highlighted this in his music for films such as Prem Geet (1981), Arth (1982), and Saath Saath (1982), and TV serials Mirza Ghalib (1988) and Kahkashan (1991). Singh is considered to be among the most successful ghazal singers and composers of all time in terms of critical acclaim and commercial success. With a career spanning five decades and many albums, the range and breadth of his work has been regarded as genre-defining.

Born in Sri Ganganagar into a Punjabi family, he received his early education at Sri Ganganagar and Jalandhar; and higher education in Haryana. Throughout this time, Singh learned music particularly the Hindustani classical tradition. He has sung in Hindi-Urdu, Punjabi, Bengali, Nepali, Gujarati and Sindhi, among many other languages, throughout his 51-year career.

His 1987 album, Beyond Time, was the first digitally recorded release in India. He was regarded as one of India's most influential artists. With sitar player Ravi Shankar and other leading figures of Indian classical music and literature, Singh voiced his concerns over politicisation of arts and culture in India and lack of support experienced by the practitioners of India's traditional art forms, particularly folk artists and musicians. He lent active support to several philanthropic endeavours such as the library at St. Mary's School, Mumbai, Bombay Hospital, CRY, Save the Children and ALMA.

Singh was awarded the Padma Bhushan by the government of India in 2003 and in February 2014, the government released a set of two postal stamps in his honour.

== Early life and career ==
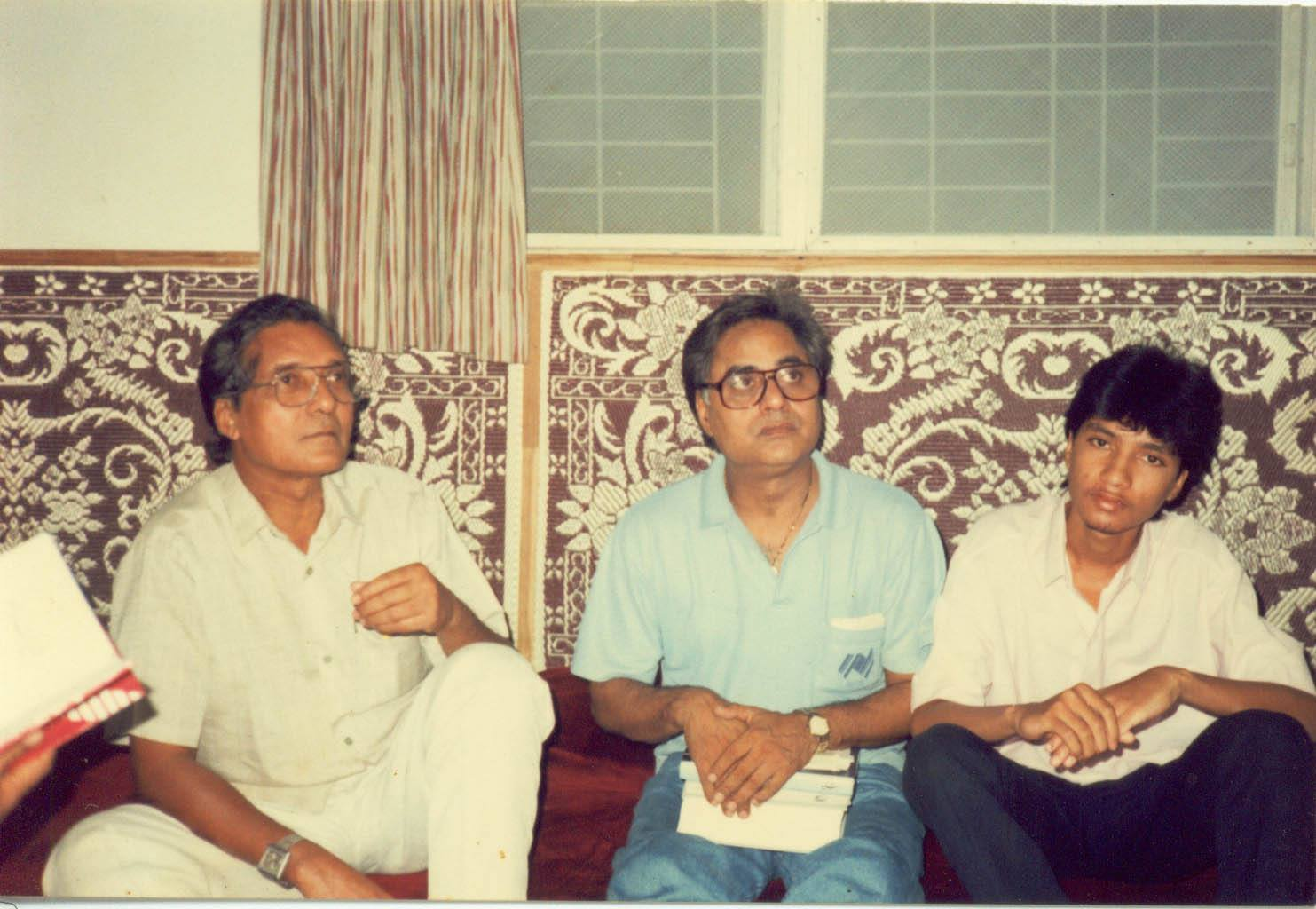
Jagjit Singh (middle) with poet Shahid Kabir and his son, Sameer Kabeer

Jagjit Singh Dhiman was born on 8 February 1941 in Sri Ganganagar, Rajasthan, India (then Bikaner State) into a Namdhari Sikh Punjabi family. His father, Sardar Amar Singh Dhiman, was a surveyor with the government's Public Works' Department and hailed from village Dalla in Ropar district of Punjab.

Educated initially at Khalsa High School and Government College in Sri Ganganagar, Singh obtained an arts degree from DAV College, Jalandhar. There, he began his professional career in 1961 by undertaking singing and composing assignments at All India Radio's (AIR) Jalandhar station. Later, he studied to obtain a post-graduate degree in history from Kurukshetra University in Haryana. Throughout this time, and as a consequence of a natural talent that was spotted by his father, Singh learned music initially from a visually impaired master of Indian classical music, Pandit Chagan Lal Sharma and later from Ustad Jamal Khan of Maihar gharana, who taught and trained him in all the prominent styles of Hindustani Classical vocal tradition such as Khayal, Dhrupad, Thumri and others. Throughout his teenage years, he performed on stage and composed music. Although his father, who was a government employee, had hoped that he would become an engineer, Singh pursued his passion for music relentlessly. Like all parents in Indian middle-class families, his father aspired for him to become a bureaucrat. However, he also encouraged Singh and his siblings to learn music.

In March 1965, and without the knowledge of his family, Singh moved to Bombay, where there were many opportunities for music artists because of the Hindi film industry. He obtained work initially as a singer of advertising jingles and later progressed to playback singing.

== Achievement ==
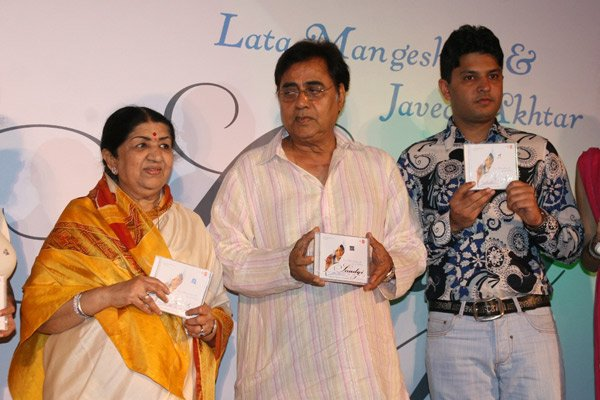
Singh with Lata Mangeshkar at the audio release of Saadgi

Singh was still struggling to make a living in 1967 when he met the Bengali-born Chitra Dutta. She divorced her husband and married Singh in December 1969. Following the birth of their son, Vivek, the couple performed as a singing duo but it was not until the 1977 release of the album The Unforgettable that they found significant, and surprising, success. In the interval, the primary difficulty for them had been that the ghazal music genre was dominated by Muslim artists and especially those from Pakistan.

The Unforgettable, which was the couple's first LP, was an unconventional recording and it turned them into stars. The song "Baat Niklegi" from the album achieved great popularity for the Singhs. The Independent described it in 2011 as "ground-breaking ... it became a transformative, before-and-after milestone in the history of Indian popular and ghazals music. It remains that." Using modern arrangements, it consists of ten tracks that include two on which they sang as a duo and the remainder equally split between Jagjit and Chitra singing the lead. The Independent further noted that "This format of solo and duet performances from the first commercially successful husband-and-wife team in Indian popular music proved astonishingly successful." Jagjit explained that "I was determined to polish up the genre and make it more acceptable to modern tastes, so chose simple poems and set them to simple tunes. I also introduced western instrumentation to make them livelier." Thereafter, the couple worked both on solo and joint musical projects and performed concerts worldwide. There was success from involvement with the film industry and they amassed considerable wealth.

Among their subsequent duo recordings of the 1970s were Shiv Kumar Batalvi – Birha da Sultan (1978), Live in Concert at Wembley (1979) and Come Alive (1979). Of those released in the 1980s, The Latest by Sudarshan Faakir was the best selling album with his lifetime hit "Woh Kagaz ki Kashti...Woh Baarish ka Paani". It was the first album by the duo with poetry of only one Poet. Ecstasies (1984) has also been described as "one of their finest". The joint projects ceased in 1990 when their 20-year-old son, Vivek, died in a road accident. Chitra felt unable to sing following these events. Monica, Chitra's daughter from her first marriage, committed suicide in 2009.

Although Jagjit continued to work and to have success after Chitra withdrew from public life he, too, was affected by the death of Vivek. The Guardian notes that he "suffered from deep depression and his anguish was often evident in his live performances." Aside from occupying himself with solo projects, which he performed in several languages, he collaborated with Lata Mangeshkar on an album titled Sajda, an Urdu word meaning "prostration".

Singh's work in film encompassed playback singing for productions such as Arth, Saath Saath and Premgeet. He composed all of the songs for the latter, as well as for the TV serial Mirza Ghalib that was based on the life of the eponymous poet, Mirza Ghalib.

On 10 May 2007, in the presence of numerous political and diplomatic luminaries at an event held in the Central Hall of the Parliament of India, Jagjit Singh rendered Bahadur Shah Zafar's famous ghazal "Lagta Nahin Hai Dil Mera" to commemorate the 150th anniversary of the Indian Rebellion of 1857.

== Albums ==
Release year	Album name	Tracklist
1982	The Latest	1. Woh Kaghaz Ki Kashti; 2. Shayad Main Zindagi Ki Sahar; 3. Zindagi Tujh Ko Jiya Hai; 4. Us Mod Se Shuroo Karen; 5. Jis Mod Par Kiye The; 6. Badi Haseen Raat Thi; 7. Teri Ankhon Mein Hamne Kya Dekha; 8. La Pila De Sharab Ai Saqi
1 December 1990	Someone Somewhere	1. Din Guzar Gaya; 2. Meri Zindagi Kisi Aur Ki; 3. Ab Ke Barsat Ki Rut; 4. Fasila To Hai; 5. Aadmi Aadmi Ko Kya Dega; 6. Mere Dukh Ki Koi Dawa Na Karo; 7. Koi Samjhega Kya Raz-E-Gulshan; 8. Dekha To Mera Saya Bhi; 9. Dil Hi To Hai
1 February 1996	Mirage	1. Apni marzi se 2. Dushman ko bhi seene se lagana 3. Ek barahman ne kaha hai 4. Koi chaudavi raat ka chaand 5. Main rahe meena rahe 6. Mujhe jeene do 7. Rishta kya hai tera mera 8. Zindagi se badi sazaa hi nahin
1998	Silsilay	1. Main Bhool Jaau; 2. Mere Dil Ne Kaha; 3. Jaate Jaate Woh Mujhe; 4. Dard Apnata Hain; 5. Mujhko Yaqeen Hain; 6. Sach Yeh Hain Bekaar; 7. Dard Ke Phool Bhi; 8. Kabhi Yu Bhi To
2000	Saher	1. Tere Baare Mein Jab Socha Nahi Tha; 2. Mujhse Bicchad Ke Khush Rehti Ho; 3. Tumne Dil Ki Baat Keh Di; 4. Mujhe Hosh Nahin; 5. Yeh Jo Zindagi Ki Kitaab Hai; 6. Yaad Nahin Kya Kya Dekha Tha; 7. Charage Ishq Jalaane Ki Raat Aaye Hai; 8. Tere Aane Ki Jab Khabar Mehke
2008	Samyog	1. Maile Khusi Didaithiye; 2. Jhulkeko Gham Sari; 3. Eakaichhina Ko Sanyog; 4. Tyo Din Tyo Raat; 5. Kasto Maya Dekhe; 6. Katha Mero Afnai; 7. Dil Chorera Badanam; 8. Kun Maya Sadar Bhyo

== Personal life ==
In 1990, Vivek Singh (Jagjit Singh and Chitra's son) died in a road accident at the age of 20. This came as a profound shock to Jagjit and Chitra Singh. They gave up music for a full year after the death. At the end of that period, Jagjit returned slowly to music, but Chitra announced her retirement and declared that she would not sing or record any more songs. In 2009, his step-daughter, Monica Chowdhary, aged 50, died by suicide.

Singh had suffered from numerous ailments like diabetes and hypertension during his later life, and had undergone two heart bypass surgeries in 1998 and 2007. A chain smoker for decades, he had stopped smoking after his first heart attack.

== Death ==
Singh turned 70 in February 2011. To celebrate his 70th birthday he committed 70 concerts in different parts of the world. He toured the UK, Singapore, Mauritius, inter alias, in 2011 and was due to perform with Ghulam Ali in Mumbai but suffered a brain haemorrhage on 23 September 2011. He was in a coma for over two weeks and died on 10 October at Lilavati Hospital, in Mumbai. He was cremated the following day at Chandanwadi Crematorium near Marine Lines in Mumbai.

A number of tributes have been paid to Singh after his death, and some tried to cash in on his popularity, which was criticised by his wife.

== Legacy ==
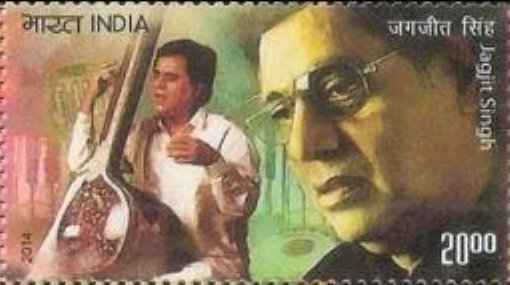
Indian Postage stamp, 2014

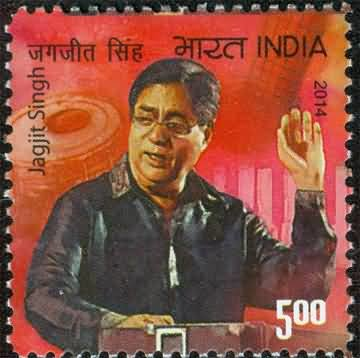

A biography of Singh, entitled Beyond Time based on about 40 hours of interviews with him, was released in 2012. It was transcribed and edited by Ashrani Mathur. A biopic documentary by the name of Kaagaz Ki Kashti has been made on the life journey of Jagjit Singh, who broke through the norms and revolutionised the Ghazal scenario. The film traces the struggle and stardom in his musical career, the love & loss in his personal life and the scope and limitations in the music scenario of the times. The film directed by Brahmanand S Singh is currently available on Amazon Prime Video in India and worldwide.

== Recognition ==
=== Civilian honour ===
- In 2003, Singh was awarded the Padma Bhushan, India's third highest civilian award, by the Government of India
- In 2012, the State Government of Rajasthan posthumously awarded Jagjit Singh its highest civilian award, the Rajasthan Ratna.

=== Other Awards ===
- In 2002 and 2005, Singh was awarded the Indian Telly Award for the best title singer for a TV show.
- In 1998, Jagjit Singh was awarded Sahitya Academy Award, a literary honour in India. He was awarded for popularising the work of Mirza Ghalib.
- Sahitya Kala Academy Award by Rajasthan government in 1998
- Ghalib Academy by Delhi Government in 2005
- Dayawati Modi Award in 1999.
- Lata Mangeshkar Samman in 1998 by Madhya Pradesh government.
- D.Litt. by Kurukshetra University, Haryana in 2003
- Teacher's Lifetime Achievement Award in 2006.8th Teacher's Achievement Awards.
- Google honoured Jagjit Singh with a doodle on his 72nd birthday on 8 February 2013.

== Film scores ==
Year	Film name	Details
1966	Bahuroopi	"Laagi Ram bhajan ni lagani"
1974	Avishkaar	"Babul Mora Naihar"
1979	Griha Pravesh	"Baat Niklegi Toh Phir"
1980	Ek Baar Kaho	"Raakh Ke Dher Ne", "Phir Pukara Hai"
1981	Prem Geet	"Hontho se chhoo lo tum"
1982	Arth	"Jhuki Jhuki Si Nazar", "Koi Yeh Kaise Bataye", "Tere Khushboo Mein Base Khat", "Too Nahin To Zindagi Mein Aur Kya Reha Jayega", "Tum Itna Jo Muskura Rahe Ho"
1982	Saath Saath	"Pyar Mujh Se Jo Kiya Tumne", "Tum Ko Dekha To Yeh Khayal Aaya", "Yeh Bata De Mujhe Zindagi", "Yeh Bata De Mujhe Zindagi", "Yeh Tera Ghar Yeh Mera Ghar", "Yun Zindagi Ki Raah Mein"
1982	Situm	
1983	Kalka	"Tarana", "Bidesiya", "Kaise Kaise Rang"
1983	Tum Laut Aao	"Aaj Tumse Bichhad Raha Hoon Main", "Ek Sapnon Ka Ghar", "Kadi Takreta Haal", "Title Music", "Tere Sapne Mere Sapne", "Zakhm Jo Aapki Inayat Hai", "Bichhadi Mori Saheliyan"
1983	Zulf Ke Saye Saye	"Nashili Raat Mein"
1984	Raavan	"Hum to Yun Apni Zindagi Se Mile", "Main Gar Mein Chunariya"
1984	Bhavna	"Mere Dil Mein Tu Hi Tu Hai"
1985	Phir Aayee Barsat	"Na Mohabbat Na Dosti Ke Liye"
1986	Aashiana	"Humsafar Ban Ke Hum"
1986	Long Da Lishkara	"Ishq Hai Loko", "Main Kandyali Thor Ve", "Sare Pindch Puare Paye"
1987	Abhishek	"Deewaron Pe Naqsh Banane Ka Hai Junoon", "Meri Ajab Hai Zindagi"
1987	Rahi	"Zindagi Mein Sada Muskurate Raho", "Dard Kaisa Bhi Ho"
1987	Aaj	"Rishta Ye Kaisa Hai", "Woh Kagaz Ki Kashti Part 1", "Woh Kagaz Ki Kashti Part 2, "Phir Aaj Mujhe", "Zindagi Roz Naye"
1988	Mirza Ghalib	TV serial directed by Gulzar
1989	Aakhri Kahani	
1989	Doosra Kanoon (TV)	"Hum Dosti Ehsaan Wafa Bhool Gaye Hain"
1989	Kaanoon Ki Awaaz	Music Director
1989	Billoo Badshah	"Yeh Jo Ghar Aangan Hai (Sad)"
1991	Kahkashan	TV serial directed by Jalal Agha, produced by Ali Sardar Jafri
1991	Diva Bale Sari Raat	"Boliyan", "Mitti Da Bawa", "Main Teri Aa", "Dama Dam Mast Kalandar", "Diva Bale Sari Raat"
1992	Nargis	"Dono Ke Dil Hai Majboor Pyar Se", "Main Kasie Kahoon Janeman"
1993	Khalnayak	"O Maa Tujhe Salaam"
1994	Neem Ka Ped	TV serial (Title song - Munh ki baat sune har koii)
1994	Khudai	"Din Aa Gaye Shabab Ke", "Ulfat Ka Jab Kisis Ne Liya Naam", "Ye Sheeshe Ye Rishte"
1994	Mammo	"Hazaar Baar Ruke Ham, Hazaar Baar Chale"
1994	Daraar	TV serial (Title song - Rishton Mein Daraar Aayee)
1995	Hello Zindagi	TV documentary (Title song - "Hai Lau Zindagi")
1996	Sailaab	TV serial (Title song - Apni Marzi Se, Rishta Kya Hai Tera Mera, Jeevan Kya Hai Chalta Phirta)
1996	Tejasvini	"Raat Ghataye Jaadu Khushboo"
1998	Dushman	"Chithi Na Koi Sandesh"
1999	Bhopal Express	"Is duniya mein rakha kya hai"
1999	Sarfarosh	"Hosh Walon Ko"
1999	Heena	TV serial (Title song - Koi Yeh Kaise Bataye)
1999	Pal Chhin	TV serial (Title song - Koi atka hua hai pal shayad)
2000	Tarkieb	"Kiska Chehra ab mai dekhun"
2000	Shaheed Udham Singh	"Sassi", "Gurbaani"
2001	Deham	"Yun To Guzar Raha Hai"
2001	Tum Bin	"Koi Fariyaad"
2002	Leela	"Dhuan Uttha Hai", "Jaag Ke Kati", "Jabse Kareeb Ho Ke Chale", "Tere Khayal Ki"
2002	Vadh	"Bahut Khoobsurat"
2003	Dhoop	"Benaam Sa Ye Dard", "Har Ek Ghar Mein Diya", "Teri Aankhon Se Hi"
2003	Joggers' Park	"Badi Nazuk Hai"
2003	Pinjar	"Haath choote"
2003	Aapko Pehle Bhi Kahin Dekha Hai	"Aisi Aankhen Nahin Dekhi"
2004	Veer-Zaara	"Tum Paas Aa Rahe Ho"
2004	STOP	"Dil Tarasta Hai"
2005	Aap Ko Dekh Kar Dekhta Reh Gaya	
2006	Umar	"Khumari Chaddh Ke Utar Gayi"
2006	Baabul	"Kehta Hain Baabul"
2007	Pyar Kare Dis: Feel the Power of Love	"O Saathi"
2010	Shahrukh Bola "Khoobsurat Hai Tu"	"Bhool Jaana"
2011	Gandhi to Hitler	"Har or tabahi ka manzar"
2011	Khap	"Tumse Bichhad Kar"
2013	Riwayat	"Aansu Kabhi Chhalke Nahi"

== Discography ==
- Arth (1982)
- Saath Saath (1982)
- Aaeena (2000)
- Aarogya Mantra (2008)
- Adaa (1992)
- Ae Mere Dil (1983)
- A Journey (2000)
- Akhand Ram Naam (2009)
- A Milestone (1980)
- Amritanjali (2009)
- An Evening With Jagjit & Chitra Singh (Live)
- A Sound Affair (1985)
- Awaaz (2007)
- Baba Sheikh Farid (Shabads & Shlokas- 2006)
- Beyond Time (1987)
- Best of Jagjit & Chitra Singh (2005)
- Bhajans (Lata-Jagjit −2004)
- Bhajan Uphar (2008)
- Biraha Da Sultan (1978)
- Chahat (2004)
- Chirag (Also known as Live in Trinidad – Islamic Devotional- 1993)
- Classics Forever (2000)
- Close to My Heart (2003)
- Come Alive in a Concert (1979)
- Cry For CRY (1995)
- Dard-E-Jigar (2011)
- Desires (1994)
- Different Strokes (2001)
- Dil- Jagjit, Asha & Lata (2002)
- Dil Kahin Hosh Kahin (1999)
- Do Dil Do Rahein (A Tribute To Mehdi Hasan- 2007)
- Echoes (1986)
- Ecstasies (1984)
- Emotions (1989)
- Encore
- Essential Chants of Shiva (2006)
- Eternity (1978)
- Face To Face (1994)
- Forever (2002)
- Forget Me Not (2002)
- Gayatri Mantra (2008)
- Ghalib Live in Concert (2014)
- Ghazal Greats Jagjit Singh And Ghulam Ali
- Ghazals from Films (1989)
- Golden Moments (1999)
- Govardhan Girdhari (2011)
- Guru Govind Singh (1998)
- Hare Krishna (Live)
- Hari Om Tatsat (2003)
- Harmony
- Hey Govind Hey Gopal (1991)
- Hey Ram (Ram Dhun)
- Hare Ram Hare Krishna (1999)
- Hope (1991)
- Kahkashan,Doordarshan TV Serial (1991–92)
- In Search (1992)
- In Sight (1994)
- In Sync- Jagjit Singh & Asha Bhonsle
- Inteha (2009)
- Jaam Utha(1999)
- Jai Raghunandan Jai Siyaram (2002)
- Jai Siya Ram (2000)
- Jazbaat (2008)
- Jeevan Kya Hai (2005)
- Jeevan Maran Chhe Ek (Gujrati)
- Kabir (2007)
- Karuna (2007)
- Keertan (Gurbani- 2000)
- Khamoshi (2002)
- Khumar
- Khwahish (2002)
- Krishna (1983)
- Krishna Bhajans (1998)
- Koi Baat Chale (2006)
- Krishna Bhajans And Music For Divine Meditation (2009)
- Krishna Dhun
- Live in Concert (1988)
- Live in Concert at the Wembley (1980)
- Live in Pakistan (1979)
- Live in Royal Albert Hall (1983)
- Live in Sydney (2006)
- Life Story (Live- 2001)
- Live With Jagjit & Chitra Singh
- Live With Jagjit Singh (1993)
- Love
- Love Is Blind (1998)
- Maa (1993)
- Madho Hum Aise Tu Aisa (2003)
- Madhusudana- Shree Krishna Dhun (2011)
- Magic Moments
- Main Aur Meri Tanhai (1981)
- Man Jeetey Jagjit (1990)
- Man Mein Ram Basa Le
- Marasim (1999)
- Mara Ghatma Shrinathji (2007)
- Mehfil (1990)
- Melodious Pair
- Memorable Concert (Live)
- Memorable Ghazals of Jagjit and Chitra (1990)
- Mirage (1995)
- Mirza Ghalib (T.V. Serial- 1988)
- Mitr Pyaare Nu (2005)
- Moksha (2005)
- Morning Prayers And Music For Divine Meditation (2009)
- Muntzir (2004)
- Nayi Disha (1999)
- Nivedan (2011)
- Om- The Divine Mantra (2007)
- Parwaaz (live at the Esplanade, Singapore- 2004)
- Passions (1987)
- Phaldata Ganesh: God Who Fulfills Wishes (2006)
- Playback Years
- Pray For India
- Punjabi Hits- Jagjit & Chitra Singh
- Radhey Krishna Radhey Shyam (2000)
- Radhey Krishna Dhun
- Rare Gems (1992)
- Rare Moments
- Ravayat
- Rishton Mein Darar Aayi
- Romance
- Masha alla
- Royal Salute
- Saanwara (2003)
- Saher (2000)
- Sai Dhun (2005)
- Sajda (1991)
- Samvedna (2002)
- Samyog (Nepali)
- Shabads Live in the UK (2014)
- Shiva (Dhuns and Bhajans- 2005)
- Shri Ganesha (2010)
- Shukrana (2011)
- Silsilay (1998)
- Solid Gold (2001)
- Someone Somewhere (1990)
- Soz (2001)
- Stolen Moments
- Tera Bayaan Ghalib (2012)
- The Inimitable Ghazals Composed by Jagjit Singh (1996)
- The Latest (1982)
- The Life And Times of Jagjit Singh (2011)
- The Master and His Magic (2012)
- The Unforgettables (1977)
- The Voice From Beyond (2013)
- Together
- Trishna (Bengali-2001)
- Tum Toh Nahin Ho (2005)
- Unique (1996)
- Vakratunda Mahakaya (2006)
- Visions (1992)
- Your Choice (1993)
- Black & White (2008) - "Yeh Hindustan Hai" (Part 1)

== See also ==
- Ghulam Ali
- Mehdi Hassan
- Aziz Mian
- Mirza Ghalib
