= Ali Sardar Jafri =

India writer (1913–2000)

- Born: 29 November 1913; Balrampur, United Provinces of Agra and Oudh, British India
- Died: 1 August 2000 (aged 89); Mumbai, Maharashtra, India
- Citizenship: Indian
- Education: Zakir Husain Delhi College; Aligarh Muslim University; Lucknow University
- Occupations: Writer, poet, critic, film lyricist
- Spouse: Sultana (m. 1948)
- Children: 2
- Writing career
- Language: Urdu
- Notable awards: Padma Shri (1967); Jawaharlal Nehru Fellowship (1971); Jnanpith Award (1997)

Ali Sardar Jafri (29 November 1913 – 1 August 2000) was an Indian writer of Urdu language. He was also a poet, critic and film lyricist.

== Biography ==
=== Early life and education ===
Ali Sardar Jafri was born in Balrampur (in present-day Uttar Pradesh), where he spent his formative years.

His early influences were Mir Anees and Josh Malihabadi. In 1933, he was admitted to Aligarh Muslim University (AMU) where he soon got exposed to Communist ideology and was expelled from the university in 1936 for 'political reasons'. However, he graduated in 1938 from Zakir Husain College (Delhi College), Delhi University, but his subsequent postgraduate studies at Lucknow University ended prematurely following his arrest during 1940–41 for writing anti-war poems, and for taking part in political activities organised by the Indian National Congress as Secretary of the university's Students' Union.

=== Literary career ===
Jafri embarked on his literary career in 1938 with the publication of his first collection of short stories called Manzil (Destination). His first collection of poems Parvaz (Flight) was published in 1944. In 1936, he presided over the first conference of the Progressive Writers' Movement in Lucknow. He also presided over their subsequent assemblies for the rest of his life. In 1939, he became co-editor of Naya Adab, a literary journal devoted to the Progressive Writers' Movement which continued to be published until 1949.

He was involved in several social, political and literary movements. On 20 January 1949, he was arrested at Bhiwandi, for organising a (then banned) Progressive Urdu writers' conference, despite warnings from Morarji Desai, the Chief Minister of Bombay State; three months later, he was rearrested.

His important works as a lyricist include Dharti Ke Lal (1946) and Pardesi (1957) . Between 1948 and 1978 he published eight poetry collections, which include, Nai Duniya Ko Salaam (Salute to the New World), (1948), Khoon Ki Lakeer, Amn Ka Sitara, Asia Jaag Utha (Asia Awakes) (1951), Patthar Ki Deewar (Stone Wall) (1953), Ek Khwab Aur (One More Dream), Pairahan-i-Sharar (The Robe of Sparks) (1965) and Lahu Pukarta Hai (The Blood Calls) (1965). These were followed by Awadh ki khak-i-haseen (Beautiful Land of Awadh), Subhe Farda (Tomorrow Morning), Mera Safar (My journey) and his last anthology entitled Sarhad (Frontier), which the then Prime Minister of India Atal Bihari Vajpayee carried with him on his bus journey to Lahore in 1999. The prime minister had invited Jafri to accompany him on this trip but ill health prevented him from doing so. Sarhad is also an audio album dedicated to Indo-Pakistan amity produced by Squadron Leader Anil Sehgal and composed and sung by "Bulbul-e-Kashmir" Seema Anil Sehgal. Atal Bihari Vajpayee made history when he presented Sarhad, as a national gift, to the then prime minister of Pakistan Nawaz Sharif, during the historic Lahore Summit, 20–21 February 1999. It was also a milestone in Jafri's life.

In the course of his literary career spanning five decades, Jafri also edited anthologies of Kabir, Mir, Ghalib and Meera Bai with his own introductions. He also wrote two plays for the Indian People's Theatre Association, produced a documentary film Kabir, Iqbal and Freedom and two television serials: the runaway success, the 18-part Kahkashan, based on the lives and works of six Urdu poets of the 20th century he had known personally viz. Firaq Gorakhpuri, Josh Malihabadi, Majaz, Hasrat Mohani, Makhdoom Mohiuddin and Jigar Moradabadi; and Mehfil-e-yaaran in which he interviewed people from different walks of life. Both serials had tremendous mass appeal. In addition, he published his autobiography. He was also the editor and publisher of Guftagu, one of the leading Urdu literary magazines of the Indian sub-continent.

Jafri died on 1 August 2000 in Mumbai, the capital of Maharashtra. To mark his first death anniversary, the book Ali Sardar Jafri: The Youthful Boatman of Joy, edited by Squadron Leader Anil Sehgal, a close associate, was published in 2001.

== Excerpts from poems ==
Ai watan khake watan woh bhi tujhe de denge
Bach raha hai jo lahoo abke fasaddat ke baad

Translation:

O my country, my beloved land we shall be most willing to sacrifice
Whatever blood is left in us after the bloodbath of riots

— Awadh ki Khak-i-Haseen

Ghareeb Sita ke ghar pe kab tak rahegi Ravan ki hukmrani
Draupadi ka libas uske badan se kab tak chhina karega
Shakuntala kab tak andhi taqdeer ke bhanwar mein phansi rahegi
Yeh Lakhnau ki shiguftagi maqbaron mein kab tak dabi rahegi

Translation:

How long will Ravan rule over the home of poor Sita
How long will Draupadi be deprived of her garment
How long will Shakuntala be enmeshed in the abyss of fate
How long will the freshness of Lucknow remain buried under the imposing tombs?

— Awadh ki Khak-i-Haseen

== Awards and honours ==
In 1998, Jafri became the third Urdu poet to receive the Jnanpith Award (for 1997), after Firaq Gorakhpuri (1969) and Qurratulain Hyder (1989). The Bharatiya Jnanpith said, "Jafri represents those who are fighting against injustice and oppression in society". He was also the recipient of several other significant awards and honours including Padma Shri (1967), Jawaharlal Nehru Fellowship (1969), the Gold medal from the Pakistan Government for Iqbal studies (1978), the Uttar Pradesh Urdu Academy Award for poetry, the Makhdoom Award, the Faiz Ahmad Faiz Award, the Iqbal Samman Award from the Madhya Pradesh government and the Sant Dyaneshwar Award from the Maharashtra government.

Aligarh Muslim University (AMU) conferred a doctorate (D.Litt.) on him in 1986, fifty years after he was expelled from the university. He was the fourth person to receive this honor, his predecessors being the notable Dr. Allama Iqbal, Mrs. Sarojni Naydu, and Hazarat Jigar Moradabadi. His works have been translated into many Indian and foreign languages.

== Personal life ==
Ali Sardar Jafri married Sultana in January 1948. They had two sons.
