= Chitra Singh =

Bengali Indian ghazal singer

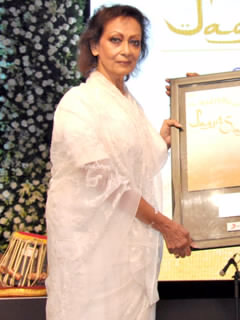
- Chitra Singh in 2012

Background information
- Also known as: Chitra Dutta
- Born: Chitra Shome; 11 April 1940 (age 86); Calcutta, Bengal Presidency, British India (present-day Kolkata, West Bengal, India)
- Genres: Ghazal, Classical, Devotional, Folk
- Occupation: Singer
- Instrument: Vocals
- Years active: 1970–1990
- Spouse(s): Debo Prasad Dutta (div. 1969) Jagjit Singh (m. 1969; died 2011)

Chitra Singh (née Shome; formerly known as Chitra Dutta) is an Indian ghazal singer. She, alongside her second husband, Jagjit Singh, popularised the ghazal genre. Respectfully known as the "king and queen of the Ghazal world," the husband and wife duo created some of the most successful Indian music of the 1970s and '80s.

== Personal life ==
Chitra was born as Chitra Shome into a Bengali kayastha family. After completing her education, she was married to Debo Prasad Dutta, an executive in a leading advertising agency. The wedding was held in the mid-1950s, and the couple had a daughter, Monica, in 1959.

While still married to Debo Prasad, Chitra met Jagjit Singh, at that time a struggling singer. Jagjit Singh was from a Punjabi Sikh Namdhari family and hailed from Sriganganagar in distant Rajasthan. They first met at a recording studio in 1967, by which time the marriage of the Duttas was already under strain for unknown reasons. Chitra found solace in Jagjit and says she was much taken by his "caring" personality. In 1968, Chitra left Prasad, taking their 9-year-old daughter with her. In 1969, she divorced her husband, secured custody of Monica, and married Jagjit Singh.

They welcomed their son Vivek Singh on 20 August 1970. In mid seventies, Chitra Singh and Jagjit Singh became famous for their ghazals and came to be known as the "King and Queen of Ghazals". Vivek died in a road accident on 27 July 1990. Chitra has never sung in public, or recorded any song, since the day her son died.

Monica first fell in love with Jehangir Chowdhary, an award-winning cinematographer. They were married in 1988 and became the parents of two sons. In 2005, Monica divorced Chowdhary and married British national Mark Houghton Roger Atkins, the managing director of a firm based in Vikhroli, Mumbai. In 2007, Monica filed a case of harassment against Atkins. In 2008, a magistrate issued a non-bailable warrant against him, but he had already fled the country. In 2009, Monica, aged 50, died by suicide. She was survived by her two sons, Armaan (17) and Umair (12). Two years after this incident, Jagjit Singh died of a brain haemorrhage in 2011. Chitra now lives with her two grandsons.

== Discography ==
- A Milestone (1976)
- The Unforgettables (1978)
- Gold Disc (1979)
- Ae mere dil (1980)
- The earliest recordings of Jagjit and Chitra Singh
- Live in concert with Jagjit Chitra Singh
- Live at Wembley
- Live at Royal Albert Hall
- The Latest
- Desires
- Arth/Saath Saath
- Chirag
- Live in Trinidad
- Main aur Meri Tanhaayee (1981)
- The Latest (1982)
- Ecstasies (1984)
- A Sound Affair (1985)
- Echoes (1985–86, Live Recordings)
- Beyond Time (1987)
- Mirza Ghalib (1988)
- Someone Somewhere (1990)
- H O P E (1991)
- "Hello World (2025)"
