= Manisha Koirala filmography =

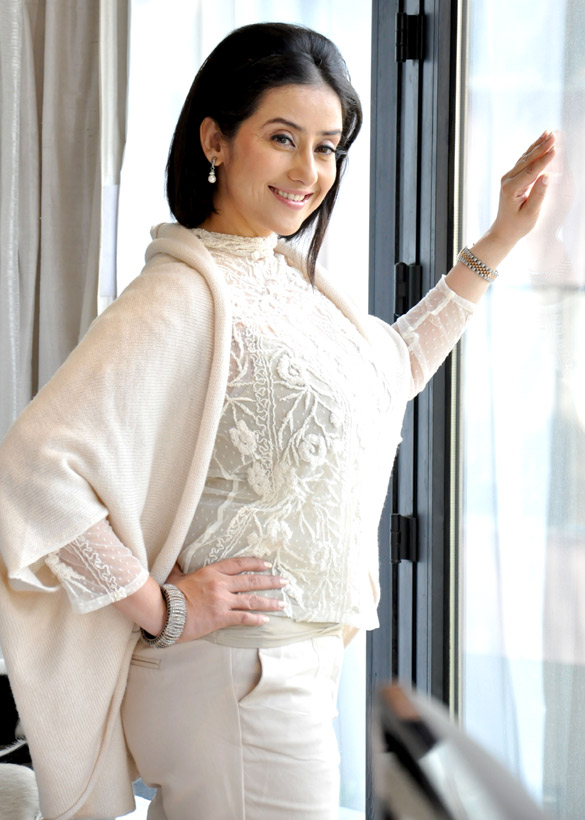
Koirala during the promotions of Bhoot Returns in 2012.

Manisha Koirala is a Nepalese actress known for her work in Hindi and Tamil films. Koirala's acting debut was in the Nepali film Pheri Bhetaula (1989). Two years later, she made her Bollywood debut in Subhash Ghai's Saudagar, which was a commercial success. However, she followed this by appearing in a series of films which performed poorly at the box office, including First Love Letter (1991), Anmol (1993), and Dhanwan (1993). Koirala's career had a turnaround when she starred as the daughter of a freedom fighter in Vidhu Vinod Chopra's 1942: A Love Story (1994). Her performance was critically acclaimed and she earned a nomination for the Filmfare Award for Best Actress. The following year, Koirala received the Filmfare Critics Award for Best Actress, and the Filmfare Award for Best Actress – Tamil for playing a Muslim married to a Hindu during the 1992–1993 Bombay riots in the Mani Ratnam-directed Tamil drama Bombay (1995).

For playing the daughter of a mute and deaf couple in Sanjay Leela Bhansali's Khamoshi: The Musical (1996), Koirala garnered a second consecutive Filmfare Critics Award for Best Actress. She followed this with leading roles in Agni Sakshi (1996) and Gupt: The Hidden Truth (1997), which were among the highest-grossing Indian films of their respective years. She played a terrorist opposite Shah Rukh Khan in Dil Se.. (1998), the first Indian film to reach the top ten in the United Kingdom box office. However, Koirala's roles in films which performed poorly at the box office, such as Dil Ke Jharokhe Mein (1997), and Achanak (1998), led to a decline in her film career. She made her television debut in 2000 as the co-host of the game show Sawaal Dus Crore Ka with Anupam Kher. The show's poor ratings led to both Kher and Koirala being fired. For her role as a gangster's girlfriend in Ram Gopal Varma's 2002 crime drama Company, she received her third Filmfare Critics Award for Best Actress. (Note: Koirala was tied in this category with Rani Mukherji for Saathiya.) Koirala also appeared in the controversial film Ek Chhotisi Love Story in which she played a woman secretly spied upon by a teenage voyeur. The following year, her portrayal of Bengali writer Sushmita Banerjee in the drama Escape from Taliban garnered her the Bengal Film Journalists' Association Award for Best Actress (Hindi).

Koirala's career continued to decline during mid 2000s, as she appeared in less mainstream films. In 2004, she made her debut as a producer with the film Paisa Vasool, which performed poorly at the box office. The following year, she portrayed Mughal princess Jahan Ara in the historical drama Taj Mahal: An Eternal Love Story. In 2008, Koirala starred in Rituparno Ghosh's Khela, where she played a woman in a troubled marriage. Two years later, she appeared as an adulterous wife in the Malayalam drama Elektra. The following year, she played a Kashmiri Muslim attempting to restore a childhood friendship in Onir's anthology film I Am (2011). In 2012, she appeared in Ram Gopal Varma's horror sequel Bhoot Returns as the mother of a possessed daughter. Later that year, she took a break from acting after being diagnosed with ovarian cancer. After six months of treatment, Koirala recovered from the condition. Three years later, she returned to acting with the psychological thriller Chehere: A Modern Day Classic (2015).

== Film ==
Key
| † | Denotes films that have not yet been released |

| Year | Title | Role(s) | Language(s) | Notes | Ref(s) |
|---|---|---|---|---|---|
| 1989 | Pheri Bhetaula | Unknown | Nepali | | |
| 1991 | Saudagar | Radha Singh Thakur | Hindi | | |
| 1991 | First Love Letter | Radha Singh | Hindi | | |
| 1992 | Yalgaar | Meghna Kumar | Hindi | | |
| 1993 | Insaaniyat Ke Devta | Nisha | Hindi | | |
| 1993 | Anmol | Anmol | Hindi | | |
| 1993 | Dhanwan | Imli | Hindi | | |
| 1994 | Yuhi Kabhi | Pooja | Hindi | | |
| 1994 | Milan | Priya | Hindi | | |
| 1994 | 1942: A Love Story | Rajeshwari Pathak | Hindi | Nominated—Filmfare Award for Best Actress | |
| 1994 | Criminal | Swetha | Telugu; Hindi | Bilingual film | |
| 1994 | Sangdil Sanam | Sanam | Hindi | | |
| 1995 | Criminal | Swetha | Hindi | | |
| 1995 | Bombay | Shaila Banu | Tamil | Filmfare Critics Award for Best Actress; Filmfare Award for Best Actress – Tamil | |
| 1995 | Anokha Andaaz | Reema | Hindi | | |
| 1995 | Guddu | Salina Gupta | Hindi | | |
| 1995 | Ram Shastra | Anjali Sinha | Hindi | | |
| 1995 | Akele Hum Akele Tum | Kiran Kumar | Hindi | Nominated—Filmfare Award for Best Actress | |
| 1995 | Dushmani: A Violent Love Story | Sapna Oberoi | Hindi | | |
| 1996 | Agni Sakshi | Shubhangi / Madhu (Note: Koirala played a character with two names in this film.) | Hindi | | |
| 1996 | Majhdhaar | Radha Rai | Hindi | | |
| 1996 | Indian | Aishwarya | Tamil | | |
| 1996 | Khamoshi: The Musical | Annie | Hindi | Filmfare Critics Award for Best Actress; Nominated—Filmfare Award for Best Actress | |
| 1997 | Sanam | Sanam | Hindi | | |
| 1997 | Gupt: The Hidden Truth | Sheetal Choudhry | Hindi | | |
| 1997 | Dil Ke Jharokhe Mein | Suman | Hindi | | |
| 1997 | Loha | Rachna | Hindi | Special appearance | |
| 1998 | Yugpurush | Sunita | Hindi | | |
| 1998 | Salaakhen | Cameo | Hindi | Special appearance in song "Pichhu Pade Hai" | |
| 1998 | Achanak | Pooja | Hindi | | |
| 1998 | Dil Se.. | Meghna / Moina | Hindi | Nominated—Filmfare Award for Best Actress | |
| 1998 | Maharaja | Shaili Mathur | Hindi | | |
| 1999 | Kachche Dhaage | Rukhsana | Hindi | | |
| 1999 | Lal Baadshah | Kiran | Hindi | | |
| 1999 | Laawaris | Anshu Mehra | Hindi | | |
| 1999 | Jai Hind | Sheetal | Hindi | | |
| 1999 | Mudhalvan | Thenmozhi | Tamil | | |
| 1999 | Kartoos | Manpreet Kaur (Mini) | Hindi | | |
| 1999 | Mann | Priya Verma | Hindi | | |
| 1999 | Hindustan Ki Kasam | Roshanaara | Hindi | | |
| 2000 | Khauff | Neha Verma | Hindi | | |
| 2000 | Baaghi | Rani | Hindi | | |
| 2000 | Raja Ko Rani Se Pyar Ho Gaya | Manisha | Hindi | | |
| 2000 | Champion | Sapna Khanna | Hindi | | |
| 2001 | Grahan | Parvati Shastri | Hindi | | |
| 2001 | Chhupa Rustam: A Musical Thriller | Nisha | Hindi | | |
| 2001 | Lajja | Vaidehi | Hindi | | |
| 2001 | Aalavandhan; Abhay | Sharmilee | Tamil; Hindi | Simultaneously shot and released in Hindi and Tamil | |
| 2001 | Moksha | Ritika Sanyal | Hindi | | |
| 2002 | Company | Saroja | Hindi | Filmfare Critics Award for Best Actress | |
| 2002 | Jaani Dushman: Ek Anokhi Kahani | Vasundhara; Divya | Hindi | | |
| 2002 | Ek Chotisi Love Story | The Woman | Hindi | | |
| 2002 | Baba | Chamundeswari | Tamil | | |
| 2003 | Escape from Taliban | Sushmita Bannerjee / Sayed Kamal | Hindi | | |
| 2003 | Calcutta Mail | Sanjana | Hindi | | |
| 2003 | Market | Muskaan Bano | Hindi | | |
| 2004 | Paisa Vasool | Maria | Hindi | Also producer | |
| 2004 | Tum?: A Dangerous Obsession | Kamini | Hindi | | |
| 2005 | Chaahat – Ek Nasha | Mallika Arora | Hindi | | |
| 2005 | Mumbai Xpress | Ahalya | Tamil | Simultaneously shot and released in Tamil and Hindi | |
| 2005 | Mumbai Xpress | Ahalya | Hindi | Simultaneously shot and released in Tamil and Hindi | |
| 2005 | Taj Mahal: An Eternal Love Story | Jahan Ara | Hindi | | |
| 2005 | Anjaane – The Unknown | Shivani | Hindi | | |
| 2006 | Darwaza Bandh Rakho | Julie | Hindi | | |
| 2007 | Anwar | Anita | Hindi | | |
| 2008 | Tulsi | Tulsi | Hindi | | |
| 2008 | Nagaram | Dancer | Telugu | Special appearance in song "Hoshiyare Hoshiyare" | |
| 2008 | Sirf....Life Looks Greener on the Other Side | Devika | Hindi | | |
| 2008 | Mehbooba | Varsha Mehra / Payal | Hindi | | |
| 2008 | Khela | Sheela | Bengali | | |
| 2009 | Do Paise Ki Dhoop, Chaar Aane Ki Baarish | Juhi | Hindi | | |
| 2010 | Ek Second... Jo Zindagi Badal De? | Rashi | Hindi | | |
| 2010 | Dharmaa | Gauri | Nepali | | |
| 2010 | Elektra | Diana | Malayalam | | |
| 2011 | Mappillai | Rajeswari | Tamil | Nominated—Filmfare Award for Best Supporting Actress (Tamil) | |
| 2011 | I Am | Rubaina | Hindi | | |
| 2012 | Bhoot Returns | Namrata | Hindi | | |
| 2015 | Chehere: A Modern Day Classic | Tarana | Hindi | | |
| 2016 | Game; Oru Melliya Kodu | Maya | Kannada | Simultaneously shot in Kannada and Tamil | |
| 2016 | Game; Oru Melliya Kodu | Maya | Tamil | Simultaneously shot in Kannada and Tamil | |
| 2016 | Edavappathy | Sumithra / Mathangi (Note: Koirala played two different characters in this film.) | Malayalam | | |
| 2017 | Dear Maya | Maya Devi | Hindi | | |
| 2018 | Lust Stories | Reena | Hindi | Anthology film | |
| 2018 | Sanju | Nargis | Hindi | | |
| 2019 | Prassthanam | Saroj Pratap Singh | Hindi | | |
| 2020 | Maska | Diana Irani | Hindi | | |
| 2021 | 99 Songs | Psychologist | Hindi | | |
| 2021 | India Sweets and Spices | Sheila Kapur | English | | |
| 2023 | Shehzada | Yashoda | Hindi | | |

== Television ==
| Year | Title | Role | Language | Notes | Ref. |
|---|---|---|---|---|---|
| 2000 | Sawaal Dus Crore Ka | Co-host | Hindi | | |
| 2003 | Larger Than Life | Herself | Hindi | Documentary | |
| 2015 | Femina Miss India 2015 | Judge | Hindi | | |
| 2024 | Heeramandi:The Diamond Bazaar | Malikajaan | Hindi | Netflix Original | |
