= Who Will Love My Children? =

1983 American biographical television film

- Print advertisement
- Genre: Drama
- Written by: Michael Bortman
- Directed by: John Erman
- Starring: Ann-Margret; Frederic Forrest
- Theme music composer: Laurence Rosenthal
- Country of origin: United States
- Original language: English

Production
- Producers: Paula Levenback; Wendy Riche
- Production locations: Sacramento, California; Elk Grove, California
- Cinematography: Thomas Del Ruth
- Editor: Jerrold L. Ludwig
- Running time: 95 minutes
- Production company: ABC Circle Films

Original release
- Network: ABC
- Release: February 14, 1983

Who Will Love My Children? is a 1983 American made-for-television biographical film based on the life of Lucile Fray. Lucile Fray was diagnosed with cancer in 1952 and wanted to find suitable homes for her ten children, since she felt her husband could not properly care for them. Prior to her death, she succeeded. The film was directed by John Erman, written by Michael Bortman, and starred Ann-Margret in her first television film. It was originally broadcast on ABC.

The same evening as its original broadcast, February 14, 1983, the children of Lucile Fray appeared on That's Incredible!, an ABC program. The film was remade in Turkish in 1984 as Yavrularım, in Malayalam in 1993 as Akashadoothu (which went on to be remade in Telugu as Matru Devo Bhava), in Kannada as Karulina Koogu, in Marathi as Chimani Pakhare, and in Hindi as Tulsi.

== Cast ==
- Ann-Margret as Lucile Fray
- Frederic Forrest as Ivan Fray
- Cathryn Damon as Hazel Anderson
- Donald Moffat as Dick Thomas
- Lonny Chapman as Milton Hammond
- Patricia Smith as Cleta Thomas
- Jess Osuna as Dr. Willis
- Christopher Allport as Kenneth Handy

=== The Fray children ===
- Patrick Brennan as Carl Fray
- Soleil Moon Frye as Linda Fray
- Tracey Gold as Pauline Fray
- Joel Graves as Warren Fray
- Rachel Jacobs as Joyce Fray
- Robby Kiger as Frank Fray
- Cady McClain as Virginia Fray
- Hallie Todd as Joann Fray
- Cory Yothers as Ivan Fray Jr.
- Kyle Chapman, Wade Chapman, and Brian Mazzanti as Stephen Fray

== Awards and nominations ==
1983 Emmy Awards
Outstanding Directing in a Limited Series Or A Special — John Erman

Nominated
Outstanding Achievement in Makeup — Zoltan Elek and Monty Westmore
Outstanding Achievement in Music Composition for a Limited Series or a Special (Dramatic Underscore) — Laurence Rosenthal
Outstanding Drama Special — Paula Levenback and Wendy Riche
Outstanding Film Editing for a Limited Series or a Special — Jerrold L. Ludwig
Outstanding Film Sound Editing for a Limited Series or a Special — Michael Hilkene, Rusty Tinsley, Bill Jackson, Joseph A. Mayer, Jill Taggart, and Ben Wong
Outstanding Lead Actress in a Limited Series or a Special — Ann-Margret
Outstanding Writing in a Limited Series or a Special — Michael Bortman

1984 American Cinema Editors Award
Best Edited Television Special — Jerrold L. Ludwig
1984 Directors Guild of America Awards
Outstanding Directorial Achievement in Dramatic Specials — John Erman (nominated)
1984 Golden Globe Awards
Golden Globe Award for Best Performance by an Actress In A Mini-series or Motion Picture Made for Television — Ann-Margret

Nominated
Best Mini-Series or Motion Picture Made for TV
