= Akashadoothu =

- Directed by: Sibi Malayil
- Written by: Dennis Joseph
- Produced by: Thomas Korah; Prem Prakash; Sajan Varghese
- Starring: Madhavi; Murali
- Cinematography: Anandakuttan
- Edited by: L. Bhoominathan
- Music by: Ouseppachan; O. N. V. Kurup (lyrics)
- Production company: Anupama Cinema
- Distributed by: Century Release
- Release date: 1993
- Country: India
- Language: Malayalam

Akashadoothu is a 1993 Indian Malayalam family drama film directed by Sibi Malayil and written by Dennis Joseph, with Madhavi and Murali in the lead roles. The film tells the tale of a woman suffering from leukemia. The plot of the film was inspired from the 1983 American film Who Will Love My Children?.

The film was critically acclaimed and became a blockbuster and was the highest grossing Malayalam film at the time of release. The film ran for over 365 days in theatres. One of the most influential melodramas of the 1990s in Malayalam, the film won the National Film Award for Best Film on Family Welfare. Madhavi won Kerala State Film Award for Second Best Actress and Filmfare Award for Best Actress. The film was remade in Telugu as Matrudevobhava, in Kannada as Karulina Koogu and in Hindi as Tulsi.

The film achieved cult status in the years following its release and regarded as one of the best emotional drama films in Malayalam cinema. A serial on Surya TV with the same name Akashadoothu was made as a sequel to the film.

== Plot ==
The story revolves around Johnny and Annie, a married couple who had both grown up together in an orphanage. They fell in love and got married. The couple have four children; the eldest being a teenage girl named Meenu, twin boys Rony and Tony, and the youngest Monu, a toddler. Rony and Tony are about 8 years old and are very close to each other. Rony is physically handicapped. Johnny is a jeep driver by profession and Annie a violin teacher. Though the family struggles to live and make ends meet, they lead a happy life together, except for the moments when Johnny, a recurrent alcoholic spends most of his daily earnings at the local toddy shop. During an altercation between Johnny and the local milk delivery man Keshavan, the latter is humiliated in front of his family. Keshavan therefore decides to take revenge on Johnny.

One day, he sees Johnny's son Tony riding a bicycle on his way home. Keshavan increases the speed of the van he is driving and knocks Tony off the road. Some bystanders bring the injured Tony to the hospital. Despite being in a not so critical condition, Tony has lost a lot of blood and requires blood transfusion. While looking for suitable donors, it is discovered that Annie's blood sample has some abnormal characteristics and she cannot donate her blood. After further analysis, it is revealed that Annie is suffering from a late stage of leukaemia and that she only has a couple of months to a year to live. The news shocks both Johnny and Annie. Johnny reforms from his alcoholic demeanor and becomes more responsible. However, as fate takes a turn, one day when Johnny is on his way home with medicine for Annie, he gets into a fight with Keshavan and is killed. Annie is devastated but remains strong willed to take care of the family. She deeply worries about the future of her children. She does not want her children to grow up in an orphanage like she and Johnny did, growing up with the label as orphans. She decides to give her children up for adoption. She lies to her kids that the money she gets out of her classes is not sufficient for them to live and therefore she is going to Germany very soon, so they have to go to new houses and there will be new parents to love and take care of them. By now Meenu has come to know about her mother's condition and asks her about it. Annie is totally broken down. Both of them keeps this a secret between them.

Annie, with the help of the priest of their church – Father Vattappara – makes arrangements for the adoption of the kids. Monu is adopted by a leading Doctor. Annie wishes that both her boys Rony and Tony live together forever and hence expects a couple to adopt both of them. But they find it difficult to get people ready to accept the disabled boy. Finally, Annie decides to give Tony to a wealthy businessman and his wife. Meenu decides not to go to a new house and be with her Mum, but Annie and Father Vattappara convince her for the same. She is taken by a rich old man and his wife to their home. The only one left is Rony, the handicapped child. Annie and father Vattappara try hard to find someone to take care of him. Mean time Annie's doctor give her a hint that days are counted for her. She wishes to celebrate Christmas at her home with her kids and makes arrangements for it. She writes a letter to Meenu asking her to always keep in touch with her brothers so that the bond between the siblings remains forever. On the day before Christmas, Annie dreams that all her children have come to see her. She wakes up and happily runs to the door, only to realise that was a dream. She starts bleeding from her nose and understands that there isn't much time left for her, she prays in front of the Crucifix begging for a day more to live so that she can see her kids for the last time. She finds real blood flowing from the wounds of Jesus in the Cross and realises that death has come for her. Later that night Rony finds her dead.

At her funeral, all her children and their newly adopted parents are there and after she is buried, the children and their families tearfully part ways, except for Rony who is about to be taken by Father Vattappara to the orphanage. The movie ends with Tony's adopted parents coming back, and Tony jumps out of the car and runs to Rony and the two embracing each other, as Tony's adopted father was moved during the farewell and agreed to take in Rony as well.

== Cast ==
- Madhavi as Annie (Voiced by Anandavally)
- Murali as Johnny
- Seena Antony as Meenu
- Ben K Alexander as Monu
- Martin Korah as Rony
- Joseph Antony as Tony
- Kuthiravattam Pappu as Chandy
- Prem Prakash as Doctor
- Subair as Dr. Stephen
- Nedumudi Venu as Fr. Vattappara
- Jagathy Sreekumar as Chemmachen
- Jose Prakash as Father Baby
- Aranmula Ponnamma as Annamma
- Thikkurissy Sukumaran Nair as Peelipose
- Suvarna Mathew as Mini
- KPAC Lalitha as Annamma's sister
- N. F. Varghese as Milkman Keshavan
- Jose Pellissery as Varghese
- Bindu Panicker as Marikunju
- Indrans as Driver Babu

== Production ==
Geetha was initially approached to play the lead female role. She rejected the role citing date conflicts and eventually Madhavi was finalised for the role.

== Soundtrack ==
The soundtrack of the film features 4 songs, written by O. N. V. Kurup and composed by Ouseppachan.

Sl no.	Song	Performer(s)
1	Kattile Mainaye	K. S. Chitra
2	Raapadee Kezhunnuvo	Yesudas
3	Shubhayatra Geethangal	Yesudas
4	Raapadee Kezhunnuvo	K.S. Chithra

== Reception ==
The film was both commercial and critical success. In 2019, Aradhya Kurup of The News Minute wrote, "After the first watch where I cried enough to get a headache, I never expected to have the same unsettling effect the second time round, that too after a few years. But I did. I howled for the same scenes – when the mom gives away her children, one by one, and their heart wrenching reactions to it. God help me!"

== Awards ==
National Film Awards

- Best Film on Family Welfare

Kerala State Film Awards

- Second Best Actress: Madhavi
- Best Singer: K. J. Yesudas
- Best Child Artist: Seena Antony

Filmfare Awards South

- Best Malayalam Actress: Madhavi
