= Aryan Vaid =

Indian model, actor, and male beauty pageant titleholder

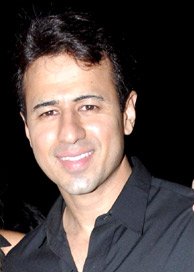
- Born: 4 July 1976 (age 50); Mumbai, Maharashtra, India
- Occupations: Model, actor
- Beauty pageant titleholder
- Years active: 2000–2019
- Major competitions: Mr. International 2000 (winner); Grasim Mister India 2000 (winner)

Aryan Vaid (born 4 July 1976) is an Indian model, who won the Graviera Mister India World modelling pageant in the year 2000. He also went on to win the Mister International Award in 2000. He was a contestant in the reality show Bigg Boss in 2006.

== Career ==
Vaid is a qualified chef and a lifestyle columnist with The Hindustan Times. He has been actively involved with theatre and has done a few street plays at the Prithvi theatre in Mumbai. It was during one of these plays that he was offered a role in the television serial, Campus. He has acted in a number of Bollywood movies. He started out his career in a small budget movie Market.

Subsequently, he had a series of small budget movies that did well at the box-office. His first big budget movie was Apne. Even though the movie had an average run, Vaid received decent reviews for his acting and physique. He then moved to the United States.

In 2006, Vaid was a housemate in the first season of Bigg Boss, the Indian version of Celebrity Big Brother, produced by Endemol India for Sony Entertainment Television. Vaid also appeared on Zee TV's show, Rab Se Sonha Ishq as Harry, a cab driver in London.

== Filmography ==
- Market (2003) – Babloo
- Film Star (2005) – Abhishek Sharma
- Chaahat – Ek Nasha (2005) – Rahul Kapoor
- Dubai Babu (2009) – Don (Kannada film)
- Fun – Can Be Dangerous Sometimes (2005) – Raj Solanki
- White Noise (2005)
- Naam Gum Jayega (2005) – Aryan Srivastav
- Sauda – The Deal (2005) – Sameer
- Ek Jind Ek Jaan (2006) (Punjabi) – Karamveer Singh
- Manoranjan (2006) – Rahul
- Aisa Kyon Hota Hai? (2006) – Raj
- Mr 100% – The Real Player (2006) – Rajesh
- Ghutan (2007) – Ravi Kapoor
- Apne (2007) – Gaurav Ghera
- Deshdrohi (2008) – Special Appearance
- Right Yaaa Wrong (2009)
- Veer (2010)
- Diary of a Butterfly (2012) – Ravi Bajaj
- Love U Crazy Girl (2014) – Akash Rathod (Police Inspector)
- Raja (2019) – Munna Singh (Bhojpuri film) Footpath Young Aryan Vaid Soorat pe teri

=== Television ===
- 2006: Bigg Boss 1
- 2008: Kahaani Hamaaray Mahaabhaarat Ki as Duryodhana
- 2013: Welcome – Baazi Mehmaan-Nawaazi Ki
- 2013: Rab Se Sohna Isshq as Harvinder
- 2014: Udaan as Kabir
- 2016-2017: Santoshi Maa as Indra Dev

Preceded by Nadir Nery Djiukich	Mister International; 2000	Succeeded by Alexander Aquino
