= Sushmita Banerjee =

Author

- Born: 1963; Calcutta, India (present-day Kolkata, India)
- Died: 4/5 September 2013 (aged 50); Paktika Province, Afghanistan
- Spouse: Janbaz Khan
- Writing career
- Notable works: Kabuliwalar Bangali Bou (A Kabuliwala's Bengali Wife)

Sushmita Banerjee, also known as Sushmita Bandhopadhyay and Sayeda Kamala (1963/1964 – 4/5 September 2013), was a writer and activist from India. Her works include the memoir Kabuliwalar Bangali Bou (A Kabuliwala's Bengali Wife; 1997) based on her experience of marrying an Afghan and her time in Afghanistan during Taliban rule. The story was used as the basis for the Bollywood film Escape from Taliban (2003). She was murdered at age 50 by suspected Taliban jihadists during the evening of 4 September or in the early morning hours of 5 September 2013, outside her home in Paktika Province, Afghanistan.

== Life ==
Sushmita Banerjee was born in Calcutta (present-day Kolkata, India) to a middle-class Bengali family. Her father worked in the civil defense department and her mother was a homemaker. She was the only sister to her three brothers. She first met her future husband Janbaz Khan, an Afghan businessman, at a theatre rehearsal in Calcutta and married him on 2 July 1988. The marriage took place secretly in Kolkata, as she feared her parents would object. When her parents tried to get them divorced, she fled to Afghanistan with Khan. She then discovered that her husband already had a wife, Gulguti. In her book, Gulguti is described as one of her brother-in-law's wives. Although shocked, she continued to live in Khan's ancestral house in Patiya village, with her three brothers-in-law, their wives, and children. Khan later returned to Kolkata to continue his business, but Banerjee could not return.

Banerjee made two abortive attempts to flee Afghanistan. She was caught and held under house arrest. A fatwa was issued against her and she was scheduled to die on 22 July 1995. With the help of the village headman, she finally fled. She reached Kabul, and took a flight back to Kolkata on 12 August 1995.

She lived in India until 2013, and published several books. She and her husband eventually reconciled, and began living together in India, before deciding to return to Afghanistan. After returning to Afghanistan, she worked as a health worker in Paktika Province in southeastern Afghanistan, and began filming the lives of local women.

== Murder ==
According to Afghan police, suspected Taliban forced entry into her house in Paktika on the night of 4 September 2013. They bound her husband and absconded with her. Her corpse was found early the next day on the outskirts of provincial capital Sharana. The body had 20 bullet hole marks. Police surmised she might have been targeted for various reasons. The Taliban denied involvement. Later, a spokesman for a renegade Taliban militia group announced it had killed Banerjee because they believed she was "an Indian spy".

== Books ==
Sushmita Banerjee wrote Kabuliwalar Bangali Bou ("A Kabuliwala's Bengali Wife") in 1995. In 2003, Escape from Taliban, a Bollywood film, starring Manisha Koirala was made based on the book. She authored Talibani Atyachar—Deshe o Bideshe (Taliban atrocities in Afghanistan and Abroad), Mullah Omar, Taliban O Ami (Mullah Omar, Taliban and I) (2000), Ek Borno Mithya Noi (Not a Word is a Lie) (2001) and Sabhyatar Sesh Punyabani (The Swansong of Civilisation).
