= Karulina Koogu =

- Directed by: D. Rajendra Babu
- Written by: D. Rajendra babu Richard Louis (Dialogues)
- Screenplay by: D. Rajendra babu
- Story by: Dennis Joseph
- Produced by: Vizag Raju
- Starring: Tiger Prabhakar; Vinaya Prasad; Srinath
- Cinematography: Ashok Kashyap
- Edited by: K. Balu
- Music by: Hamsalekha
- Production company: Aditya Movie Makers
- Release date: March 1994
- Running time: 142 minutes
- Country: India
- Language: Kannada

Karulina Koogu is a 1994 Indian Kannada-language drama film directed by D. Rajendra Babu and produced by vizag Raju. The film stars Prabhakar, Vinaya Prasad and Srinath. The film was widely popular for the songs composed and written by Hamsalekha upon release.

The film is a remake of Malayalam hit Akashadoothu (1993) directed by Sibi Malayil and was subsequently remade in Telugu as Mathrudevobhava (1993) and in Hindi as Tulsi. Both the Malayalam and Telugu versions had actress Madhavi in the lead role. However, in Kannada version, she was replaced by Vinaya Prasad. The original version was based on the 1983 American film Who Will Love My Children?.

== Plot ==
A Church-like Hindu order provides the spiritual context for this unusual story about the extinction of a lower-class alcoholic family. The drunkard Mohan (Tiger Prabhakar ) is married to Sharada (Vinaya Prasad), a cultured music teacher employed in a Hindu ashram, who tries to reform her husband. The villain in this allegory of a Hindu community is a Christian, Antony, who tries to rape Sharada and later kills Mohan shortly after Sharada is diagnosed as terminally ill with cancer. Sharada dies before she can find adoptive parents for her children, but the saintly head of the ashram (Srinath) does this for her. The film also has a few comic scenes, e.g. in a bar, where a series of jokes culminate in a song talking about the plight of Kannada speaking people in Bangalore city.

== Cast ==
- Tiger Prabhakar as Mohan
- Vinaya Prasad as Sharada
- Srinath as Swamiji
- Doddanna
- Ashalatha
- Shanthamma
- Umashree as Arrack shop owner Rukkamma
- Srinivasa Murthy
- Pramila Joshai
- Lakshman Rao
- M. S. Karanth
- Richard Louis
- Baby Roopa
- Bank Suresh

== Soundtrack ==
The music of the film was composed and lyrics written by Hamsalekha. All the songs in the soundtrack were received well upon release.

Track listing
No.	Title	Singer(s)	Length
1.	"Alabeda Magale"	S. P. Balasubrahmanyam
2.	"Naanu Badava"	Mano & K. S. Chithra
3.	"Hendkuduka Ratna"	Mano
4.	"Bidurina Kolalu"	K. S. Chithra
5.	"Raagavagi Naanu"	K. S. Chithra
