= Achanak (1998 film) =

- Directed by: Naresh Malhotra
- Written by: Sachin Bhowmick; Anwar Khan (dialogues)
- Produced by: Vijay Galani
- Starring: Govinda; Manisha Koirala; Farha Naaz; Rahul Roy; Paresh Rawal
- Cinematography: Raju Kaygee
- Edited by: Naresh Malhotra
- Music by: Dilip Sen-Sameer Sen
- Production company: Film Folks
- Release date: 12 June 1998
- Running time: 159 minutes
- Country: India
- Language: Hindi
- Budget: ₹4.25 crore
- Box office: ₹7.26 crore

Achanak (English: Suddenly) is a 1998 Indian action thriller film directed by Naresh Malhotra starring Govinda and Manisha Koirala. The film was a box office failure.

== Plot ==
Wealthy industrialist Yashpal Nanda is widowed and lives with his daughter, Nisha, and two sons, Vijay, and Arjun . He gets Nisha married to Nilesh, while Vijay marries Madhu, and Yashpal is on the look-out for a suitable bride for Arjun. Arjun lives a charmed life, surrounded by the family he loves and working at his family's thriving business. Then he meets Pooja, and his life gets even better. The two quickly fall in love. Yashpal is overjoyed and happy with Arjun's choice and cannot wait for them to get married. The Nanda family's world gets turned upside down when Nisha and then Vijay pass away suddenly, leaving the family devastated. Pooja is mistakenly convicted of murder, and Arjun must save her while he keeps up his family responsibilities, but his father soon meets a cruel end as well. The police arrive on the scene to arrest Arjun for murder. Now, on the run from both the police and the mysterious criminals, Arjun and Pooja work to expose the truth while evading a fate at the hands of either.

== Cast ==
- Govinda as Arjun Nanda
- Manisha Koirala as Pooja
- Farha Naaz as Madhu Nanda
- Rahul Roy as Vijay Nanda
- Johnny Lever as Joni / Moni / Toni Kapoor
- Pinky Singh as Nisha Nanda
- Saeed Jaffrey as Yashpal Nanda
- Paresh Rawal as Sagar Srivastav
- Dalip Tahil as Nilesh
- Tinnu Anand as Police Inspector Pandey
- Vishwajeet Pradhan as Jackson, Sagar Srivastav's henchman
- Navneet Nishan as Anjali
- Dinesh Hingoo as P.K Sharma
- Viju Khote as Veternity Dr. M.Dasturi
- Sanjay Dutt as Himself (Cameo)
- Shahrukh Khan as Himself (Cameo)
- Raj Babbar as Himself (Cameo)

== Soundtrack ==
Achanak

Soundtrack album by Dilip Sen-Sameer Sen
- Released: 11 May 1998
- Genre: Feature film soundtrack
- Label: Venus Records & Tapes

#	Songs	Singers
1	"Dil Le Gaya Chor Pakdo"	Abhijeet & Johnny Lever
2	"Duniya Bhulake"	Kumar Sanu, Alka Yagnik
3	"Ek Soni Kudi Dila De"	Abhijeet, Alka Yagnik
4	"Jaane Jaana"	Abhijeet, Alka Yagnik
5	"Na Koi Awaaz De Humko"	Hariharan, Alka Yagnik
6	"Oonchi Oonchi Deewaron Mein"	Hariharan, Alka Yagnik
7	"Jhoomle"	Abhijeet, Kavita Krishnamurthy
