= Chaahat – Ek Nasha =

2005 film by Jai Prakash

Chaahat - Ek Nasha
- Movie poster
- Directed by: Jai Prakash
- Written by: Meeraq Mirza
- Produced by: Umesh Chouhan
- Starring: Manisha Koirala; Aryan Vaid; Preeti Jhangiani; Sharad Kapoor; Govind Namdev; Sayaji Shinde; Brijesh Tiwari
- Cinematography: Yogesh Jani
- Edited by: Sanjay Sankla
- Music by: Anand Raj Anand
- Distributed by: Chamunda Films
- Release date: 11 February 2005
- Running time: 140 minutes
- Country: India
- Language: Hindi
- Budget: ₹2,25 crore
- Box office: ₹1,53 crore

Chaahat – Ek Nasha is a 2005 Indian Hindi-language romantic drama film directed by Jai Prakash. It premiered on 11 February 2005. The film stars Manisha Koirala, Aryan Vaid, Preeti Jhangiani and Sharad Kapoor.

== Plot ==
Mallika Arora, a pop star, falls in love with Rahul Kapoor, the owner of RK Music World. He thinks of her as his best friend only. Though she is physically attracted to Rahul, she does not want to tie the knot. Rahul and Mallika have had physical relations. However, when he proposes to her, she politely turns him down, saying that she does not believe in wedlock. She is strongly of the view that the instant a couple gets married, love and attraction slip away.

The story takes a new turn with the downfall of Mallika, as all of her albums are flopping and she is becoming a fading star. Rahul launches a newcomer, Rashmi Jaitly, in his new music video. Rashmi's debut music video is a big hit, and she becomes a star overnight. Rahul falls in love with her, and Rashmi reciprocates his feelings. Rahul decides to marry her.

When this reality of Rahul's falling in love with Rashmi dawns upon Mallika, she is shattered. She gets drunk and orders her personal bodyguard, Jaidev, to kill Rahul. However, the next morning, when her alcoholic intoxication vanishes, Mallika realizes her mistake and calls up Jaidev in order to stop him from killing Rahul.

But Jaidev, who is in one-sided love with Mallika, is all set to eliminate Rahul. A dangerous game has begun, in which Mallika wants to save her love at any cost.

== Cast ==
- Manisha Koirala as Mallika Arora
- Aryan Vaid as Rahul Kapoor
- Preeti Jhangiani as Rashmi
- Sharad Kapoor as Jaidev
- Govind Namdev as Dr. Sanjeev Jaitley
- Sayaji Shinde as Manmohan Rangeela

== Music ==
Chaahat - Ek Nasha

Studio album by Anand Raj Anand
- Released: 24 January 2005
- Genre: Feature film soundtrack
- Label: Venus Records & Tapes
- Producer: Anand Raj Anand

Anand Raj Anand chronology
Bullet - Ek Dhamaka (2005)	Chaahat - Ek Nasha (2005)	Jurm (2005)

The soundtrack of the film contains six songs composed by Anand Raj Anand.

Song	Singer(s)
Chura Liya	Vinod Rathod, Shreya Ghoshal
Dil Ki Baatein	Babul Supriyo, Sunidhi Chauhan, Shreya Ghoshal, Vinod Rathod
Dilbar	Tarranum
Ishq Ki Raat	Sunidhi Chauhan, Shreya Ghoshal, Sonu Nigam
Mallika	Sunidhi Chauhan
Yeh Chehra	Udit Narayan, Alka Yagnik
