= Market (2003 film) =

- Poster
- Directed by: Jay Prakash
- Written by: Miraq Mirza (screenplay); Arshad Sidhiqi (story)
- Produced by: Rama Adhikari; Atif Khan
- Starring: Manisha Koirala; Suman Ranganathan; Aryan Vaid
- Cinematography: Thomas A. Xavier
- Edited by: Shabbir Ahmad Khan
- Music by: Jani Babu; Vaishno Deva; Altaf Raja
- Release date: 12 September 2003
- Running time: 160 minutes
- Country: India
- Language: Hindi
- Budget: ₹ 2 crore
- Box office: ₹ 4,27 crore

Market is a 2003 Indian crime film directed by Jay Prakash, starring Manisha Koirala. The film follows the story of Muskaan Bano (Manisha Koirala) from her life in Indian brothels after being sold there by her Arab husband to her attempts at revenge later in life. The film garnered a decent opening and was a surprise success of the year. It was declared "Semihit" at the box office.

== Plot ==
Muskaan Bano, a young woman brimming with life and dreams in a small Andhra Pradesh village, found her world shattered when her parents, manipulated by greed, married her off to a wealthy Arab man. Her hopes for a happy marriage were quickly extinguished. Instead, she endured exploitation and was discarded within a week through a swift divorce. Her father committed suicide on seeing her humiliation. Determined to fight for justice, Muskaan and her family embarked on a long legal battle against this man who had so callously used her, for eight long years, but this battle ended in disappointment when the man's lawyer bribed the judge, leading to his acquittal and further shattering Muskaan's faith in justice.

Crushed by this betrayal of the legal system and the weight of her circumstances, Muskaan was trapped in the brutal reality of Mehndi bazaar - the red-light district of Hyderabad, where she had to take to prostitution and face the dehumanizing realities of the sex trade. Every day was a struggle, a testament to the cruelty she had endured. The red light district was vacated and shut based on government orders with the passing time and she moved to Mumbai. In Mumbai she was caught in a raid, However, fate intervened when a compassionate police officer, Sawant, noticed Muskaan's spirit. He introduced her to Juicy, a shrewd pimp who managed a network of high-class escorts. Juicy took Muskaan under her wing, changing her name to Mallika and, with the help of Lisa and Isha, helped transform her into a sophisticated and sought-after call girl.

As Mallika, Muskaan experienced a different side of the same world. She met Babloo, a criminal, who was captivated by her, but love was not her priority. Her world took another turn when she witnessed the violent murder of Isha, her friend in the trade. Following the events of the tragedy, she and Lisa were summoned to Dubai by Yashwant Anna, a powerful don, setting the stage for a fateful confrontation with the man who had wronged her years ago - her ex-Arab husband. With her old wounds ripped open, Mallika's desire for revenge grew, hardening her resolve to not only survive but to seek vengeance on those who had caused her so much pain. Now, the fight wasn't just for her survival but also to settle scores.

== Cast ==
- Manisha Koirala as Muskaan Bano/Mallika
- Aryan Vaid as Bablu Pandey
- Suman Ranganathan as Lisa
- Pratima Kazmi as Khaala
- Shweta Menon as Isha
- Johnny Lever
- Makrand Deshpande as Anthony
- Govind Namdeo as Anna
- Sayaji Shinde

== Music ==
Title	Singer(s)
"Aaj To Madhur Milan Hoga"	Alka Yagnik
"Hum Pyar Jo Tera Payenge (Duet)"	Alka Yagnik, Kumar Sanu
"Hum Pyar Jo Tera Payenge (Solo)"	Kumar Sanu
"Meri Gali Mein Tera Aana"	Sunidhi Chauhan, Chorus
"Meri Gali Mein Tera Aana- Male"	Altaf Raja, Chorus
"Khalliwali Khalliwali"	Hema Sardesai, Sunidhi Chauhan, Chorus
"Khalliwali Khalliwali- Male"	Altaf Raja, Chorus
