= Paisa Vasool (2004 film) =

- Poster
- Directed by: Srinivas Bhashyam
- Written by: Srinivas Bhashyam; Anurag Kashyap
- Produced by: Manisha Koirala; Siddharth Koirala
- Starring: Manisha Koirala; Sushmita Sen; Sushant Singh
- Cinematography: Nirav Shah
- Edited by: Shirish Kunder
- Music by: Bapi–Tutul
- Release date: 9 January 2004
- Running time: 139 minutes
- Country: India
- Language: Hindi
- Budget: ₹3 crore
- Box office: ₹69 lakh

Paisa Vasool is a 2004 Indian Hindi-language crime comedy film written and directed by Srinivas Bhashyam. The film stars Manisha Koirala, Sushmita Sen and Sushant Singh.

== Synopsis ==
After a chance encounter at a club, the struggling actress Baby decides to move in with Maria, a withdrawn divorcee who is having financial troubles and run-ins with the mafia. By accident, the two women overhear a conversation in which a man confesses committing robbery to his girlfriend. The two women decide to blackmail him for a piece of the action. Unfortunately, the robbers have no intention of sharing the loot, nor are they too thrilled about anyone knowing their secret.

== Cast ==
- Manisha Koirala as Maria Mhatre
- Sushmita Sen as Baby
- Sushant Singh as Johnny Rozario
- Tinnu Anand as Uncle Ji
- Makrand Deshpande as Biryani
- Rajkumar Kanojia as Shetty
- Ashok Kumar Beniwal as Inspector
- Lokesh Pandit as Goon
- Rakhi Sawant as dancer in the item song 'Maine Saiyan Ki Demand'

== Soundtrack ==
Paisa Vasool

Soundtrack album by Bapi-Tutul
- Released: November 2003
- Genre: Film soundtrack
- Label: Times Music

The soundtrack is composed by Bapi–Tutul with lyrics penned by Sandeep Nath.

No.	Title	Singer(s)	Length
1.	"Paisa Vasool"	Sunidhi Chauhan	04.18
2.	"Maine Saiyan Ki Demand"	Ila Arun	03.03
3.	"Rukte Chalte"	Shankar Mahadevan	04.44
4.	"Bindas"	Vasundhara Das	04.07
5.	"Paisa Vasool – Male"	Hamza Farooqui	04.16
6.	"Helen’s Dance"	Pandit Sukhdev Chaturvedi, Swastika	06.40
7.	"Yaadon Mein Aksar Aate Rahe"	Shaan, Shreya Ghoshal	03.25
8.	"Sabse Bada Rupayya"	Shaan, Shreya Ghoshal	04.42
9.	"Hai Re Hai Tera Ghungta"	Kunal Ganjanwala, Soumya Rao	05.11

== Reception ==
Taran Adarsh of IndiaFM gave the film 0.5 stars out of 5, writing ″Director Srinivas Bhashyam is saddled with an uninspiring screenplay and he needs to partner the blame partly. He may be a sound technician, but a director ought to be a good story teller.″

Ronjita Kulkarni of Rediff.com gave a positive review, writing ″It must have taken guts for Koirala to make her production debut with a film like this. Her efforts are commendable. Paisa Vasool may not tell a unique story, but it definitely lives up to its name″.
