= Bhoot Returns =

- Theatrical release poster
- Directed by: Ram Gopal Varma
- Story by: Ravi Shankar
- Produced by: Jitendra Jain
- Starring: Manisha Koirala; J. D. Chakravarthy; Madhu Shalini; Alayana Sharma
- Cinematography: Harshraj Shroff; M. Ravichandran Thevar
- Edited by: Sunil M. Wadhwani
- Music by: Sandeep Chowtha
- Production company: Alumbra Entertainment
- Distributed by: Eros International
- Release date: 12 October 2012
- Running time: 85 minutes
- Country: India
- Language: Hindi
- Budget: ₹7.50 crore ~USD789,096.00
- Box office: ₹6.39 crore ~USD672,086.78

Bhoot Returns (lit. 'Ghost Returns') is a 2012 Indian Hindi-language 3D horror film directed by Ram Gopal Varma and written by Ravi Shankar. The film was released on 12 October 2012 to mixed reviews.

The film stars Manisha Koirala, J. D. Chakravarthy, Madhu Shalini and Alayana Sharma in the lead role. Although advertised as a sequel to the 2003 film Bhoot, also directed by Varma, the two film's do not have any connection with one another and have complete different plots.

== Plot ==
Tarun, an architect, moves into a luxurious bungalow with his wife, Namrata, and their children, 10-year-old Taman and 6-year-old Nimmi. During an exploration of the house, Nimmi finds a doll and includes someone named 'Shabbu' in all her activities. The family mistakes Nimmi's new doll for Shabbu, but is surprised when Nimmi points to an empty space and introduces her invisible friend as Shabbu. Her parents suspect that her wild imagination is the reason for her new 'friend'.

Soon, Tarun's younger sister, Pooja, surprises the family with a visit. As Tarun, Namrata and Pooja discuss Nimmi's fixation on Shabbu, the family servant, Laxman, is certain that there is a spirit's presence in the house. Laxman's worries receive a strong backlash from Tarun, an ardent sceptic. Soon, each night at the bungalow seems to turn for the worse, with knocks at unearthly hours, demonic sounds and eerie movements. Tarun suspects Laxman of being the mischief-maker, trying to prove his point. As Nimmi's fixation on Shabbu increases, the family decides to consult a psychiatrist. The psychiatrist explains Nimmi's imaginary friend as the result of her loneliness and describes it as a common technique used by children to seek attention.

Laxman's sudden disappearance and Pooja's growing curiosity about the ongoing activity lead her to install wireless cameras at various places in the house, which record Nimmi playing with what seems like a ghostly apparition. Tarun's mind starts reeling as he sees the captured footage; it is proof enough for the disturbed family to finally decide to leave the house. But the house has other plans: Nimmi is found missing the next morning. The police are called in to investigate, but they consider the family delusional and take little interest in the matter.

Tarun receives a mysterious phone call, with Nimmi's voice coming from the upper floor, after which they find Laxman murdered. The house seems to be on lockdown, and the phones are jammed. Taman is mysteriously killed. Nimmi appears to be possessed by the spirit and tries to kill both her parents, until she is finally burned and defeated with Pooja's help, as the remaining family flees, bloody and injured. Nimmi comes out of the building at a low angle, then introduces herself as Shabbu to the neighbourhood children.

== Cast ==
- Manisha Koirala as Namrata Awasthi
- J. D. Chakravarthy as Tarun Awasthi
- Madhu Shalini as Pooja
- Alayana Sharma as Nimmi
- Bharat Ganeshpure as Police Inspector
- Nitin Jadhav as Laxman
- Kushank Thacker as Taman

== Marketing ==
The first-look poster was released September 2012. It depicts a girl with four eyes and two noses in an optical illusion-styled photograph. The poster, however, was termed as a "blatant copy" and a rip-off of a campaign poster made by a Mumbai-based ad agency to spread awareness against drunken driving.

=== Official trailer ===
The first trailer premiered in theaters with the release of Raaz 3. It features a little girl playing with a spirit in the living room, the scene being captured on webcam. The trailer was certified an "A" rating from the Censor Board of India.

== Critical reception ==
Professional ratings
Review scores
Source	Rating
DNA India	1.5/5 stars
The Times of India	2/5 stars
Bollywood Hungama	1.5/5 stars
Independent Bollywood	1.5/5 stars
Rediff	2.5/5 stars

The film received to mixed to negative reviews. Rajeev Masand of CNN-IBN said the film is time-pass entertainment, as Varma succeeds in keeping you on the edge, and the film does deliver a few good scares in 3D. Madhureeta Mukherjee of Times of India gave it 2 stars. "We did leave with one horrifying thought though – of this Bhoot returning (in a third instalment). Hellllppp!!!" said ToI. Rediff Movies said "Bhoot Returns has quite a few nail-biting moments but ends abruptly" and gave it 2.5 star. Taran Adarsh of Bollywood Hungama gave it 1.5 stars. Kanika Sikka of DNA gave it 1.5 stars. Rohan J.Tambe of Independent Bollywood gave it 1.5 stars and said "Save your money and time by skipping this movie.The film was then given a U/A certificate"

== Title rights ==
Karan Johar's Dharma Productions acquired the title rights of the Bhoot film series from Ram Gopal Varma to make their own franchise, the first part of a planned trilogy Bhoot – Part One: The Haunted Ship starring Vicky Kaushal, Ashutosh Rana, and Bhumi Pednekar, directed by Bhanu Pratap Singh was released in 2020.
