= I Am (2010 Indian film) =

2010 Indian anthology film

- Theatrical release poster
- Directed by: Onir
- Screenplay by: Onir; Urmi Juvekar; Merle Kroeger
- Story by: Onir; Urmi Juvekar; Merle Kroeger
- Produced by: Sanjay Suri; Onir; Rajesh Kumar Jain (Co Producer)
- Starring: Juhi Chawla; Manisha Koirala; Rahul Bose; Nandita Das; Arjun Mathur; Pooja Gandhi; Sanjay Suri; Anurag Kashyap; Purab Kohli; Shernaz Patel; Radhika Apte; Manav Kaul; Abhimanyu Singh
- Cinematography: Arvind Kannabiran
- Edited by: Onir; Irene Dhar Malik
- Music by: Amit Trivedi; Vivek Phillip; Rajiv Bhalla
- Distributed by: Anticlock Films
- Release dates: 18 September 2010 (I View Film Festival); 29 April 2011 (India)
- Running time: 110 minutes
- Country: India
- Language: Hindi
- Budget: ₹1.75 crore
- Box office: ₹67 lakh

I Am is a 2010 Indian Hindi-language anthology film by Onir. It consists of four short films: "Omar", "Afia", "Abhimanyu", and "Megha". Each film shares the common theme of fear, and is based on real-life stories. The film was financed by donations from more than 400 people worldwide, many of whom donated through social networking sites like Facebook. There are four stories but the characters are interwoven with each story. "Abhimanyu" is based on child abuse, "Omar" on gay rights, "Megha" is about Kashmiri Pandits and "Afia" deals with sperm donation & IVF. I Am was released with subtitles in all regions as six different languages are spoken in the film: Hindi, English, Kannada, Marathi, Bengali and Kashmiri.

== Plot ==
Each film shares the common theme of fear, and each film is based on real-life stories. They are:

- "Afia" - A single woman Afia (Nandita Das) decides to become a mother using a sperm donor. She is a web designer by profession. She had been pushing her husband Manav (Manav Kaul) for a child but Manav left her for another woman. She then decides to have a child on her own, through a IVF. She visits Doctor Basu's (Anurag Basu) clinic and asks the doctor to provide her more details of the Donor. She meets Suraj (Purab Kohli) and asks him a few questions wherein Suraj feels awkward. Later, she goes ahead with the insemination and offers Suraj reward as a thank you gift. Suraj politely declines but gives her his phone number. In the last scene, they show a smiling Afiaa tearing the note on which Suraj's phone number is written.
- "Megha" - Almost 20 years after leaving Kashmir, Kashmiri Pandit Megha (Juhi Chawla) returns home on a business trip to find her childhood Muslim friend Rubina (Manisha Koirala) has suffered too. Megha is angry at the people who made her leave along with her family in the middle of the night, also killed her uncle Vikas but in the end she realises that she was the lucky one to have left and lived a prosperous life whereas people in Kashmir are still paying the price. "Megha" is inspired by Sanjay Suri's real life experiences in Kashmir.
- "Abhimanyu" - Abhimanyu (Sanjay Suri), a successful director, is haunted by memories of sexual abuse as a child. He must deal with his dark memories even as he struggles with his sexual identity. Initially his girlfriend accuses him of cheating on her but once they get news of his stepdad's demise, he finally reveals to her that his stepdad sexually abused him since his childhood. He tells the same to his mother who refuses to accept the truth. "Abhimanyu" is based on the experiences of fashion designer Ganesh Nallari and gay rights activist Harish Iyer.
- "Omar" - Jay Gowda (Rahul Bose), from Bangalore, meets Omar, a struggling actor in Mumbai, (Arjun Mathur). They flirt and have dinner together and then have sex in a public place. A policeman (Abhimanyu Singh) manhandles them both and threatens Jay to turn him in under Section 377 of the Indian Penal Code and blackmails him into giving 100,000 Rupees as bribe. Omar goes with Jay's ATM card to draw money; meanwhile the policeman rapes Jay. Omar returns with 50,000 Rupees, which the policeman takes along with both Jay and Omar's cellphones. Then he takes Omar along with him against protests of Jay. (A hint of the policeman intending to rape Omar.) Later on, Jay meets Omar again in a hotel and tells him that later that night, Jay had gone and woke up a big lawyer and went with him to the police station to get Omar released only to find that Omar was never there. Then he realized that Omar was a part of the plot to extort money from Jay. "Omar" is inspired by stories and research material provided by the online portal Gay Bombay.

== Cast ==
=== Afia ===
- Nandita Das as Afiaa Kidwai
- Purab Kohli as Suraj
- Anurag Basu as Doctor Basu
- Manav Kaul as Manav in a special appearance

=== Megha ===
- Juhi Chawla as Megha
- Manisha Koirala as Rubina
- Rushad Rana as Rubina's brother
- Madhu Sagar as Ami (Rubina's mother)
- Behram Rana as Abu (Rubina's father)
- Faisal Burza as the lawyer
- Fayeem Shah as Rubina's cousin
- Mushtaq Kak as Beig Shab (shop keeper)

=== Abhimanyu ===
- Sanjay Suri as Abhimanyu "Abhi"
- Radhika Apte as Natasha/Nats
- Shernaz Patel as Asha (mother)
- Anurag Kashyap as Vinay (step-father)
- Pooja Gandhi as Aparna

=== Omar ===
- Rahul Bose as Jay Gowda
- Arjun Mathur as Omar
- Abhimanyu Singh as Policeman

== Production ==
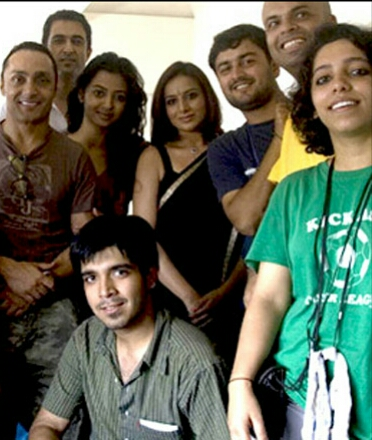
Artists on the set of the film in 2010.

Onir first developed an idea for a short film while in Berlin, Germany. He later decided to make four shorts as he had too many ideas to fit into only one film. "Abhinmanyu" was originally written as a full-length film starring Karisma Kapoor in her comeback, but after she pulled out Onir changed the main character to a male and turned it into a short film. The shorts were shot on location in Srinagar ("Megha"), Mumbai ("Omar"), Bangalore ("Abhimanyu") and Kolkata ("Afia"). The "Afia" segment was originally intended to explore corruption in NGOs, but Onir decided to focus on sperm donation instead. During location shooting in Srinagar for the "Megha" segment, the crew was attacked by rocks and received terror threats and had to shift to Karan Nagar. Onir returned later under the guise of a documentary filmmaker to capture additional footage.

=== Sponsorships through social media ===
Onir raised financing from not only the film's stars, but also from members of the general public from around the world. Using Twitter and Facebook, Onir offered backers co-production credit in the film and a share in the profits. People who donated more than Rs. 100,000 became co-producers with a share in profits while those who contributed less than Rs. 100,000 received a mention in the credits. People have sent their contributions from Austria, the US, Nigeria and Australia. I Am is the first mainstream Hindi film that is crowd-sourced through social networking sites. Over 400 people from 45 cities across the world made this film happen by volunteering or contributing financially.

=== Celebrity contribution ===
Many of the participants in the film worked for free; Juhi Chawla, Manisha Koirala and Anurag Kashyap did not draw salaries and Manish Malhotra designed the film's costumes for free. Fashion designers like Manish Arora and Aki Narula have made costumes available for free, while actors and his friends Juhi Chawla and Sanjay Suri, and director Anurag Kashyap have supported him with ideas. Juhi Chawla and Purab Kohli also financially contributed to the stories in the movie.

== Release ==
I Am had its world premiere at the I View Film Festival in New York City. It screened at several other film festivals like the International Film Festival of Kerala and the Vancouver International Film Festival. I Am was originally scheduled for theatrical release in India and Australia on 22 April 2011, but Onir changed it to 29 April. To promote the release of the film, Onir has started a script writing contest where the authors of the 10 best scripts will win a meeting with him to pitch their screenplays. I Am will have a staggered release internationally beginning in New Zealand, and then moving to the US, Canada and Europe.

=== Home media ===
The DVD of I Am released on 31 May.

== Reception ==
=== Critical response ===
I Am received mainly positive reviews from critics. The Times of India called it "an important and intelligent film" and The Film Street Journal named it "a must watch". Taran Adarsh gave the film three and a half stars and named it "a motion picture of major significance" and "a landmark film". Rajeev Masand praised I Am for "fine performances and its inherent honesty". Critics particularly praised Abhimanyu Singh and Nandita Das for their performances. On the other hand, Shilpa Jamkhandikar of Reuters called I Am "painfully rehearsed" and "oversimplified".

=== Box office ===
In its opening weekend I Am released on 67 screens in India and 7 in Australia, but failed to make an impact at the box office. It was fourth in overall weekend collections, ranking ahead of only Zokkomon. The Times of India blamed the poor collections on the film's depiction of social issues, saying it was "restricted only to discerning audience".

== Soundtrack ==
I Am

Soundtrack album by Amit Trivedi, Rajiv Bhalla, Vivek Phillip
- Released: 8 April 2011
- Genre: Film soundtrack
- Length: 39:31
- Label: Sony Music

Professional ratings
Review scores
Source	Rating
Bollywood Hungama	link

The soundtrack for I Am was released on 8 April 2011 on Sony Music. The songs are composed by Amit Trivedi, Rajiv Bhalla and Vivek Phillip with lyrics by Amitabh Verma and Amitabh Bhattacharya.

No.	Title	Music	Artist(s)	Length
1.	"Baangur"	Amit Trivedi	Mame Khan, Kavita Seth	4:32
2.	"Issi Baat Pe (Agar Zindagi)"	Amit Trivedi	Krishnakumar Kunnath	4:23
3.	"Bhojhal Se"	Rajiv Bhalla	Krishnakumar Kunnath	4:49
4.	"Aankhein"	Vivek Phillip	Karthik	4:24
5.	"Saye Saye"	Amit Trivedi	Rekha Bhardwaj, Mohan	5:08
6.	"Wundoo Yeredoo"	Rajiv Bhalla	Rajiv Bhalla	3:53
7.	"Bhojhal Se" (Remix)	Rajiv Bhalla	Krishnakumar Kunnath	4:21
8.	"Issi Baat Pe" (The Bombay Bounce Club Mix)	Amit Trivedi	Krishnakumar Kunnath	2:58
9.	"Baangur" (Remix by DJ Suketu feat PaVaN)	Amit Trivedi	Mame Khan, Kavita Seth	4:24

== Accolades ==
In 2012 I Am won the National Film Awards for Best Hindi Film and Best Lyrics.

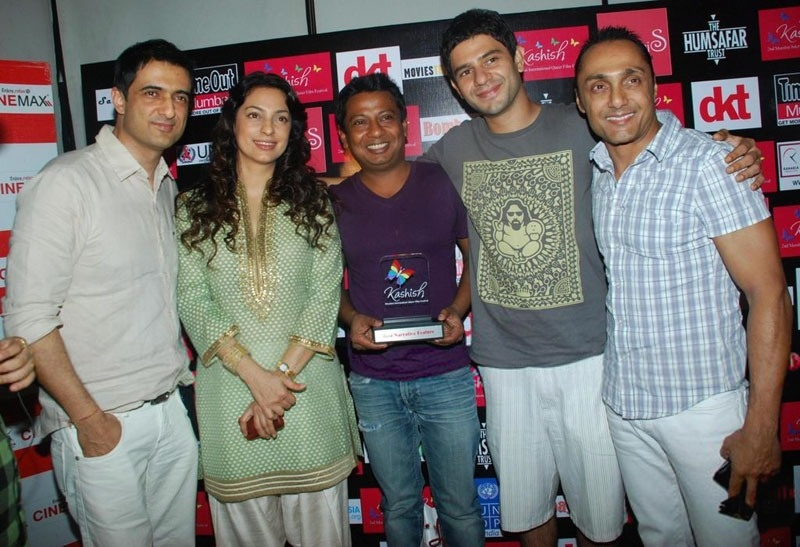
The cast of I Am at the 2011 Mumbai Queer Film Festival where the film won Best Narrative Feature. Left to right: Sanjay Suri, Juhi Chawla, Onir, Arjun Mathur, Rahul Bose.

The scripts for "Abhimanyu" and "Omar" were nominated for Triangle Media Group (TMG) Global Awards. I Am also won the Audience Award at the 2010 River to River. Florence Indian Film Festival, the Best Asian Film Award at the International Film Festival of Kerala, and the I-VIEW Film Festival's Engendered Award for Human Rights.

- Triangle Media Group's David Flint Honorary Award for Promoting Human Rights The Triangle Media Group, Biennial Global Awards felicitated Sanjay Suri and Onir for their upcoming film I Am. The award was for Media for Social Justice. Onir was in Nottingham to receive the award from Lord Mayor of Nottingham Jeannie Packer and Vernon Coaker, MP Minister of State for Schools and Learners.

Year	Award
2010	NETPAC Award for the Best in Asian Cinema at the International Film Festival of Kerala
2010	Special Mention by the International Jury at the International Film Festival of Kerala
2010	The Engendered Award for Human Rights at the IView Film Festival
2010	Audience Choice Award for Best Film at the River to River. Florence Indian Film Festival
2010	Sanjay Suri and Onir, Media for Social Justice Award at the Biennial Global Awards
2011	Best Film Award at the London Asian Film Festival
2011	Juhi Chawla, Best Actress Award at the London Asian Film Festival
2011	Best Narrative Feature Film at the Kashish-Mumbai Queer Film Festival
2011	Onir, Best Director Award at Dainik Jagran Film Festival, New Delhi
2012	Onir, Best Director Award at IRDS Film awards for social concern
2012	Filmfare Best Supporting Actress-Juhi Chawla-Nominated
2012	Asiavision Movie Awards-Juhi Chawla-Excellence in Hindi Cinema Award
2012	Asiavision Movie Awards-Onir-Excellence in Hindi Cinema-Creative

Official Selection

Year	Film Festival
2010	Winner of I-View 2010s Engendered Award for Outstanding Contribution (Opening Film)
2010	Vancouver International Film Festival (Canadian Premiere)
2010	International Film Festival of Kerala
2010	Hamburg QIFF
2010	River to River Film Festival, Florence (Audience Choice Award, Best Film)
2010	Chennai International Film Festival
2010	Guggenheim Berlin
2011	Kandy International Film Festival, Sri Lanka
2011	Durban International Film Festival
2011	Human Rights Film Festival, Syracuse, New York

I Am has also been opening or a closing film for the following festivals

- Opening Film London Asian Film Festival, 2011
- Closing Film Australian Indian Film Festival, 2011
- Opening Film New Zealand Indian Film Festival, 2011
- Opening The Silk Screen Film Festival, Pittsburgh (US), 2011
- Closing Film Seattle South Asian Film Festival, 2011
