= Dharmaa =

Dharma
- Directed by: Dipendra K. Khanal
- Written by: Ugesh Raimajhi
- Produced by: Durga Pokharel
- Starring: Rajesh Hamal; Manisha Koirala
- Release date: 2010
- Country: Nepal
- Language: Nepali

Dharma is a 2010 Nepali film directed by Dipendra K. Khanal starring Rajesh Hamal and Manisha Koirala in her second Nepali film after 22 years, who had been busy with Indian films. The film was released to mixed reviews and was considered commercially successful at the box office.

== Cast ==
- Rajesh Hamal
- Manisha Koirala as Gauri
- Nikhil Upreti
- Rejina Upreti

== Production ==
The film was originally named Rajniti. The film was shot in Kathmandu for 51 days and in Pokhara for 4 days. An argument ensued while filming a scene in which Manisha Koirala had to cry. Koirala told Dipendra K Khanal to take the scene based on how she was crying and that she couldn't cry the way the director wanted.

== See also ==
- List of Nepalese films
