= Escape from Taliban =

- DVD cover
- Directed by: Ujjwal Chatterjee
- Written by: Sushmita Banerjee (book A Kabuliwala's Bengali Wife); Ujjwal Chatterjee (screenplay); Shubhrajyoti (dialogue)
- Produced by: Ashok Khemka; Vijay Nopany
- Starring: Manisha Koirala; Nawab Shah
- Cinematography: Vivek Banerjee
- Edited by: Ujjal Nandi
- Music by: Songs: Babul Bose; Score: Vanraj Bhatia
- Release date: 14 February 2003
- Running time: 166 minutes
- Country: India
- Languages: Hindi; Urdu; English
- Budget: ₹ 3.50 crore
- Box office: ₹ 1.44 crore

Escape from Taliban is a 2003 Indian film directed by Ujjwal Chatterjee. The film is based on the story A Kabuliwala's Bengali Wife by Sushmita Banerjee, who fled Afghanistan in 1995 after six years of living there with her Afghan husband.

Banerjee, whose book inspired this movie, was shot dead by suspected Taliban militants in Afghanistan in September 2013, because they believed she was "an Indian spy".

== Plot ==
The story is based on the life of Sushmita Bannerjee, a Bengali Hindu woman who was married to an Afghan businessman in 1989. She moved to Afghanistan in the same year and fled back to India in 1995 to escape the Taliban, who issued a death sentence for her because she refused to abide by their rule on converting to Islam.

== Cast ==
- Manisha Koirala as Sushmita Banerjee / Sayed Kamal
- Nawab Shah as Jaanbaaz
- Vineeta Malik as Abu
- Prithvi Zutshi as Dranai Chacha
- Alyy Khan as Abdul Malik
- Yusuf Hussain as Colonel Banerjee

== Production ==
The film was shot in Jaisalmer, Hyderabad, Mumbai and Ladakh.

== Music ==
Lyrics were penned by Mehboob.

Song	Singer
"Ae Jaan-E-Jaan"	Udit Narayan, Kavita Krishnamurthy
"Titli Si Ud Chali"	Alka Yagnik
"Jeete Hain Yahan"	Kumar Sanu
"Jeete Hain Yahan" (Arabic)	Chorus
"Kahan Se Aate Hain"	Asha Bhosle, Sunidhi Chauhan
"Rimil Baba"	Sadhana Sargam, Babul Supriyo, Sonu Nigam
