= Chehere: A Modern Day Classic =

Chehere
- Film poster
- Directed by: Rohit Kaushik
- Written by: Rohit Kaushik
- Produced by: Inderjit Singh Daheley
- Starring: Jackie Shroff; Manisha Koirala; Gulshan Grover; Divya Dutta; Hrishita Bhatt; Aarya Babbar; Rakesh Bedi
- Production company: AM Movies UK Ltd
- Distributed by: Rich Juniors Entertainment
- Release date: 28 August 2015 (Theatrical)
- Country: India
- Language: Hindi

Chehere: A Modern Day Classic, is a 2015 Indian psychological thriller film written and directed by Rohit Kaushik. Chehere stands for "faces" in English. The film stars Jackie Shroff, Manisha Koirala, Gulshan Grover, Divya Dutta, Hrishita Bhatt, Aarya Babbar, Bob Brahmbhatt, Rakesh Bedi, and Geeta Vij. Chehere was released on 28 August 2015.

== Plot ==
Chehere is a period drama set in the 1950s that revolves around the life of a retired silent era actor played by Manisha Koirala. The actress in the film has a bitter relationship with her sister (played by Divya Dutta), a poet. There is clash of ideas and perspectives and what follows is mystery.

== Cast ==
- Jackie Shroff
- Manisha Koirala
- Gulshan Grover
- Divya Dutta
- Hrishita Bhatt
- Aarya Babbar
- Bob Brahmbhatt
- Rakesh Bedi
- Geeta Vij

== Soundtrack ==
Song title	Singer
"Jo Ab Ja Chuke"	Shaan, Shilpa Rao and Mahalaxmi Iyer
"Chaand Baadal Me"	Shreya Ghoshal and Kunal Ganjawala
"Kabhi Khud Se Kam"	Sunidhi Chauhan, Shilpa Rao and Mahalaxmi Iyer
"Zindagi"	Shankar Mahadevan and Zila Khan
