= Do Paise Ki Dhoop, Chaar Aane Ki Baarish =

- Film Poster
- Directed by: Deepti Naval
- Written by: Deepti Naval
- Produced by: Kite Films
- Starring: Manisha Koirala; Rajit Kapur; Sanaj Naval
- Cinematography: Kiran Deohans
- Music by: Sandesh Shandilya
- Release dates: 22 May 2009 (Cannes); 22 September 2019
- Running time: 122 minutes
- Country: India
- Language: Hindi

Do Paise Ki Dhoop, Chaar Aane Ki Baarish is a 2009 Indian film written and directed by Deepti Naval, starring Manisha Koirala, Rajit Kapur and Sanaj Naval.

== Plot ==
Juhi is an aging prostitute whose son Kaku requires a wheelchair. She finds it challenging to take care of him with the limited number of customers that now find her attractive. Debu, a not-so-successful lyricist, is dumped by his boyfriend, and is out on streets. These characters, in need of money and love, bump into each other, after which their lives take a similar direction. Their relationships, born out of mutual needs, change their perceptions about each other, which in turn brings a change in them—finally, a sunny day after days of merciless downpour.

== Cast ==
- Manisha Koirala as Juhi
- Rajit Kapur as Debu
- Sanaj Naval as Kaku
- Milind Soman
- Naseer Abdullah as Producer
- Alyy Khan as Ali (guest appearance)

== Release ==
This art film premiered at the market section of 2009 Cannes Film Festival. It was slated to release theatrically on 8 March 2012 in India but was postponed. The film was released worldwide on Netflix on 22 September 2019.

== Critical reception ==
The film got a positive response at 2009 Cannes Film Festival.

Gapers Block gave a moderate rating, calling the plot unoriginal, comparing it to an "elongated episode of Will & Grace". The representation of Debu, who is semi-closeted, was also criticised, for its stereotyped gay characteristics. Shoma A. Chatterji of The Citizen called the film "niche" while praising the performances of three principal characters stating, "But the cream and the cake go to the three actors".

=== Accolades ===
- 2010-Best Screenplay - The New York Indian Film Festival (MIAAC)
