= First Love Letter =

1991 Indian film by Shiva

- Poster
- Directed by: Shiva
- Written by: Ram Kelkar; Kamlesh Pandey
- Produced by: Pahlaj Nihalani
- Starring: Vivek Mushran; Manisha Koirala; Dalip Tahil
- Cinematography: Baldev Singh
- Edited by: Nand Kumar
- Music by: Bappi Lahiri
- Release date: 13 September 1991 (India)
- Country: India
- Language: Hindi

First Love Letter is a 1991 Indian Hindi-language romance film directed by Shiva starring Vivek Mushran and Manisha Koirala.

== Plot ==
The story opens with Radha, wanting more from life than just being a rich heiress to her father Thakur Ajit Singh's, fortunes and wants to relocate from her home to the hilly locales of Palampur, where her father has a house. This is not liked by her father, but he has to relent due to the intervention of his younger brother Thakur Shrikant Singh, who has been a recluse since the murder of his lady love Kasturi.

In the hilly locales, Radha is mesmerized one day to the melodies of a flute, which she follows and meets Shyam, who also saves her life when she is about to fall in the deep gorges of the valleys. They meet again and slowly develop a bond of inseparable love, both being drawn to each other's youth and simplicity. Radha does not disclose her true identity, at first and when Shyam learns that she is the daughter of Thakur Ajit Singh, he feels cheated as he considers him to be a tyrant landlord. To top it, Thakur Ajit Singh also dislikes this growing intimacy between a local milk-seller, which is the profession of Shyam and his only daughter. So he fixes the marriage of his daughter to Thakur Ambar Singh.

Meanwhile, Radha is attacked by seasoned killer Bheema, who wants to molest her, but is timely saved by Thakur Ambar Singh, who also now falls in love with her. His mother, Uma Devi, makes him all the more happy when she tells him that Radha was the same girl that she has fixed his marriage with. This alliance when revealed to Radha by her father and mother, is rejected by her, but she is forcibly married to Thakur Ambar Singh. Radha on her part, leaves the marriage ceremony and tells Thakur Ambar Singh that she loved Shyam and had secretly married him.

Thakur Ajit Singh now gets Shyam embroiled in a false police case and gets him imprisoned from where he jail breaks with none other than the killer Bheema. Bheema is hired as a contract killer by Thakur Ajit Singh to kill Shyam. What follows is a bloody encounter with Thakur Ambar Singh, Bheema, Radha and Shyam, where like a true Rajput, Thakur Ambar Singh wants to leave Radha for Shyam, seeing their love, and is horribly wounded in the prospect. The end sees Thakur Ajit Singh realizing his mistake of separating the true lovers and unites them in matrimony.

== Cast ==
- Vivek Mushran as Shyam
- Manisha Koirala as Radha
- Chunky Pandey as Thakur Ambar Singh
- Danny Denzongpa as Thakur Ajit Singh
- Dalip Tahil as Thakur Shrikant Singh
- Gulshan Grover as Bheema
- Reema Lagoo as Shyam's Mother
- Beena Banerjee as Mrs. Ajit Singh
- Sushma Seth as Uma Singh
- Paintal as Sher Singh
- Harish Patel as Bahadur Singh

== Soundtrack ==
Song	Singer
"Jab Se Mile"	Lata Mangeshkar
"Deewani Deewani"	S. P. Balasubrahmanyam, Lata Mangeshkar
"Tota Tota, Sajan Se Kehna"	S. P. Balasubrahmanyam, Lata Mangeshkar
"Kambal Na Hatao"	S. P. Balasubrahmanyam, Asha Bhosle
"Jab Se Mile"	S. P. Balasubrahmanyam
"Kaatke Ungli"	S. P. Balasubrahmanyam
"Gajron Se"	Kavita Krishnamurthy

== Reception ==
India Today wrote, "Schmaltzy. It's Romeo in Krishna garb - flute and all. Can be ignored."
