= Sawaal Dus Crore Ka =

- Presented by: Anupam Kher; Manisha Koirala; Ashutosh Rana
- Country of origin: India
- Original language: Hindi
- No. of seasons: 1

Production
- Camera setup: Multi-camera
- Running time: Approx. 52 minutes

Original release
- Network: Zee TV
- Release: 26 October 2000

Sawaal Dus Crore Ka is an Indian Hindi-language television reality game show series that aired on Zee TV on 26 October 2000. The series was hosted by actors Anupam Kher and Manisha Koirala. The questions were devised by Derek O'Brien who earlier hosted Cadbury Bournvita Quiz Contest.

== Format ==
All episodes were shot at Chitrarth studio at Hiranandani Gardens Powai. In the first buzzer round, only 21 contestants are selected among all those who participated. Then 3 questions are asked to all these chosen contestants to select only 3 contestants for the second round, and whoever answers the questions right first moves to the next round.

In the second round, the three contestants are asked 3 questions again and whoever answers the qcompete with each other and whoever gets "two out of three" questions right will move into the rounds that follow; the others will be eliminated. This continues for the next 9 rounds.

The buzzer round gives the winner Rs 1. For each subsequent round, a zero is added to that figure. To win the magic figure of Rs 100 million he will have to go past nine rounds of questioning. If the contestant answers wrong in the eighth round, he/she will get only Rs. 1 million as the prize money.

The viewers could also win anywhere from Rs. 2,000 to Rs. 15,000. They need to have a copy of TV World, the Zee TV programming guide with them. Each copy of TV World will have a six digit number printed on its cover. During each show one number will be generated by a computer and announced. Should a viewer have a TV World copy with all six digits matching he stands to win Rs 200,000; if he/she has five digits matching the prize is Rs 15,000; if four, it is Rs 4,000.

== Controversy ==
The channel took Anupam Kher to the court due to breaking the contract and deserting the show without any prior notice. Anupam Kher stated that he "had to leave five or six films for the show and he had planned the film shooting schedules around SDCK." He was replaced by Ashutosh Rana.

== Hosts/anchors ==
- Anupam Kher
- Manisha Koirala
- Ashutosh Rana (replaced Anupam Kher)
