= Mehbooba (2008 film) =

2008 Indian film by Afzal Khan

- Film poster
- Directed by: Afzal Khan
- Written by: Rumi Jaffery; Javed Siddiqui; Afzal Khan
- Produced by: Shabina Khan
- Starring: Sanjay Dutt; Ajay Devgn; Manisha Koirala
- Cinematography: Ashok Mehta
- Edited by: Ballu Saluja
- Music by: Ismail Darbar
- Production company: Shabbo Arts
- Distributed by: Eros International
- Release date: 11 July 2008
- Running time: 170 minutes
- Country: India
- Language: Hindi
- Budget: ₹220 million
- Box office: ₹37.8 million

Mehbooba (transl. Beloved) is a 2008 Indian Hindi-language romantic drama film written, produced and directed by Afzal Khan. The story is based on a love triangle, with the lead protagonists being Sanjay Dutt, Manisha Koirala and Ajay Devgan. The music of the film was composed by Ismail Darbar. The film was shot in 2000 but released on 11 July 2008. It was a box-office bomb.

== Plot ==
The story follows a rich playboy businessman named Shravan. One day, he meets the beautiful and vivacious Varsha, whom he tries to woo and become friends with. After a while, he proposes marriage to Varsha, to which she eventually agrees. The two get engaged and go on a holiday together. However, while on holiday, Shravan tells Varsha that he faked his love for her and proposed only so that he could sleep with her. Heartbroken, Varsha leaves the country in an attempt to get away from Shravan and begins a new life under the name of Payal. Shravan returns to his home and tells his family that things did not go well with Varsha.

Ten years later, Payal meets a man named Karan, a young artist, who begins to follow her. He tells her that she is the woman he sees in his dreams, and they fall in love. Payal agrees to marry him, and they begin their wedding preparations. However, during the week of the wedding ceremony, Shravan, who is revealed to be Karan's brother, arrives in the village. Both Shravan and Payal are shocked when they recognize each other.

Gossip about the two begins to spread, and Karan, after finding out the truth, attempts suicide by coming in front of a moving train. Shravan tries to save Karan but gets hit by the train. He confesses to Karan that he had been cruel to Varsha/Payal. Shravan is hurt and struggles to make Karan promise to take care of Payal and not tell their family that Payal is Varsha. He tries to ask for forgiveness, but dies in Karan's arms.

== Cast ==
- Sanjay Dutt as Shravan Dhariwal
- Ajay Devgn as Karan Dhariwal
- Manisha Koirala as Varsha / Payal
- Asrani as Khairatlal
- Bindu as Mona, Karan's aunt
- Annu Kapoor as Hari Singh / Lal Singh
- Kader Khan as Advocate Shahid
- Mushtaq Khan as Parvez
- Razzak Khan as Godbole
- Reema Lagoo as Kamla, Shravan and Karan's mother
- Tirlok Malik as Mallik
- Suman Ranganathan as Suman
- Aasif Sheikh as Inder Kumar Saxena, Shravan's friend
- Himani Shivpuri as Razia
- Rajeev Verma as Gajanan Mehra
- Sanober Kabir as singer in the song "Babuji Bahut Dukhta Ha"

== Music ==
The soundtrack was composed by Ismail Darbar with lyrics by Anand Bakshi.

| | Song | Singer |
|---|---|---|
| 1 | "Tu Meri Mehbooba" | Udit Narayan |
| 2 | "Khwabon Ki Rani Hai" | Udit Narayan |
| 3 | "Dilruba" | Udit Narayan |
| 4 | "Yaar Tera Shukriya" | Alka Yagnik, Udit Narayan |
| 5 | "Deewana" | Sukhwinder Singh, Sonu Nigam |
| 6 | "Babuji Bahut Dukhta Hai" | Alka Yagnik |
| 7 | "Kuch Kar Lo" | Sonu Nigam |
| 8 | "Kuch Kar Lo" | Shankar Mahadevan, Kavita Krishnamurthy |
| 9 | "Kuch Kar Lo Kuch" | Kavita Krishnamurthy |
| 10 | "Achcha To Ab Main Chalta Hoon" | Sonu Nigam |
