= Anmol =

1993 film by Ketan Desai

- Poster
- Directed by: Ketan Desai
- Written by: Anil Nagrath; Sohel Don (dialogues)
- Screenplay by: Honey Irani
- Story by: Prayag Raj
- Based on: Cinderella
- Produced by: Manmohan Desai
- Starring: Rishi Kapoor; Manisha Koirala
- Cinematography: Jal Mistry
- Edited by: Anil Gandhi
- Music by: Raamlaxman
- Production company: MKD Films
- Release date: 27 August 1993
- Running time: 163 minutes
- Country: India
- Language: Hindi

Anmol (transl. Priceless) is a 1993 Indian film directed by Ketan Desai and produced by his father Manmohan Desai and starring Rishi Kapoor, Manisha Koirala in lead roles. This was the final film produced by Manmohan Desai before his death in 1994. The plot is loosely based on the fairytale Cinderella.

== Cast ==
- Rishi Kapoor as Prem
- Manisha Koirala as Anmol
- Sudha Chopra as Anmol's stepmother
- Gufi Paintal as Anmol's step-uncle
- Puneet Issar as Zafar
- Dara Singh as Zafar's father
- Saeed Jaffrey as Prem's father
- Jaya Mathur as Champa (Anmol's stepsister)
- Rubeina Khan as Chameli (Anmol's stepsister)
- Sujata Mehta as Geeta (Guest appearance)
- Anil Dhawan as Anmol's father (Guest appearance)
- Johnny Lever as Himself (Guest appearance)

== Soundtrack ==
Audio is available on CDs, LPs and Digital Downloads by Tips Industries. Music is conducted by Raamlaxman, arranged by Uttam Singh, and lyrics of songs written by Maya Govind, Dev Kohli, Rani Malik, Ravinder Rawal and Raamlaxman.

| Song | Singer |
|---|---|
| "Sun Sun Sun Mere Saathiya" | Lata Mangeshkar |
| "Dil Ki Lagi Kaahe Jaane Na" | Lata Mangeshkar |
| "Dil Lagane Ki Na Do Sazaa" | Lata Mangeshkar |
| "Batao Tum Kaun Ho, Khayalon Mein Jo Chha Gaye" | Lata Mangeshkar, Udit Narayan |
| "Aayegi Woh Aayegi, Daudi Chali Aayegi" (Happy) | Lata Mangeshkar, Udit Narayan |
| "Aayegi Woh Aayegi, Daudi Chali Aayegi" (Sad) | Lata Mangeshkar, Udit Narayan |
| "Paigham De Rahi Hai" | Udit Narayan |
| "Ke Main Hoon Kaun" | Kumar Sanu |
| "Koi Ishq Ka Rog Lagaye Na" | Parveen Sultana |
