= Khamoshi: The Musical =

1996 Hindi film by Sanjay Leela Bhansali

- Film poster
- Directed by: Sanjay Leela Bhansali
- Written by: Sanjay Leela Bhansali
- Dialogues by: Sutapa Sikdar
- Produced by: Sibte Hassan Rizvi
- Starring: Nana Patekar; Salman Khan; Manisha Koirala; Seema Biswas
- Cinematography: Anil Mehta
- Edited by: Bela Segal
- Music by: Songs: Jatin–Lalit; Remo Fernandes; Score: Babloo Chakravarty
- Production companies: PolyGram Filmed Entertainment; Tri-Star International
- Distributed by: Phaedra Cinema
- Release date: 9 August 1996
- Running time: 160 minutes
- Country: India
- Language: Hindi
- Budget: ₹6 crore
- Box office: ₹14.26 crore

Khamoshi: The Musical (transl. Silence: The Musical) is a 1996 Indian Hindi-language musical romantic drama film written and directed by Sanjay Leela Bhansali in his directorial debut. The film stars Nana Patekar, Salman Khan, Manisha Koirala, and Seema Biswas. The story is about Joseph and Flavy Braganza, a deaf couple in Goa. They have a baby girl, Annie, who is able to speak and hear. A few years later they have another baby, a boy named Sam, who also speaks and hears. Annie's life is divided into two worlds – one with her parents and the other of music, which she loves.

A box office failure when released, the film has over the years gained cult following.

Koirala's portrayal of Annie, a caring daughter of a deaf-mute couple, was critically praised, and is regarded as one of her finest performances. She won several awards for her performance, including the Screen Award for Best Actress and her second consecutive Filmfare Critics Award for Best Actress.

== Plot ==
The story is about Joseph and Flavy Braganza, a deaf couple in Goa. They have a baby girl, Annie, who is able to speak and hear. A few years later they have another baby, a boy named Sam, who also speaks and hears. Annie's life is divided into two worlds – one with her parents and the other of music, which she loves. Annie gets her musical inspirations from her grandmother, Maria Braganza.

A few years later, after the tragic death of Sam, Annie's life is shattered and music and singing fade away. When Annie grows up she gets in touch with music once again – with Raj whom she falls in love with. She starts singing again. When Annie gets pregnant, her father tells her to abort the baby because it will dishonor the family. Annie refuses to go against her church and religion. When Joseph learns this, he asks Annie to leave the house. Raj tries to convince Annie's father that he is a nice guy, but Joseph dislikes him mainly because he is a Hindu who doesn't live in Goa, so Annie would have to live far away from him.

Annie marries Raj and gives birth to a boy, whom they name Sam, after her brother. She, Raj, and Sam go to Joseph's house to reconcile with him. Joseph accepts Annie's boy and approves Raj as his son-in-law. Things are really beautiful until their life takes a drastic turn. Annie and Raj have a devastating accident; Annie is seriously injured and goes into a coma. Joseph, Flavy, and Raj try hard to revive her, even trying to stir her emotionally for the sake of Sam. The broken Raj, Joseph's moving mute "speech", and Flavy's love and hope bring Annie back to consciousness.

== Cast ==
- Nana Patekar as Joseph Braganza, Annie's father
- Salman Khan as Rajant "Raj" Kashyap
- Manisha Koirala as Annie Braganza Kashyap
  - Priya Parulekar as young Annie
- Pratik Gala as
  - Sam Braganza, Annie's deceased brother
  - Sam Kashyap, Raj and Annie's son
- Seema Biswas as Flavy J. Braganza, Annie's mother
- Raghubir Yadav as Willie
- Himani Shivpuri as Neelima Kashyap, Raj's mother
- Sunil Shende as Raj's father
- Anil Mehta as the Priest
- Helen as Maria Braganza, Joseph's mother and Annie's grandmother
- Ashok Lokhande as Fredericks, shop owner

== Soundtrack ==
Khamoshi: The Musical

Soundtrack album by Jatin–Lalit, Remo Fernandes
- Released: April 1996
- Genre: Feature film soundtrack
- Length: 59:30
- Label: Universal Music India
- Producer: Jatin–Lalit

Jatin–Lalit, Remo Fernandes chronology
Fareb (1996)	Khamoshi: The Musical (1996)	Return of Jewel Thief (1996)

The soundtrack was composed by Jatin–Lalit and Remo Fernandes. The lyrics were written by Majrooh Sultanpuri. The soundtrack topped the music charts in India, and was #97 on the list of "100 Greatest Bollywood Soundtracks of All Time", compiled by Planet Bollywood.

No.	Title	Singer(s)	Length
1.	"Bahon Ke Darmiyan"	Hariharan, Alka Yagnik
2.	"Aankhon Mein Kya"	Kumar Sanu
3.	"Gaate Thay Pehle Akele"	Kavita Krishnamurthy, Shraddha Pandit, Khusumum
4.	"Jaana Suno Hum Tum Pe Marte Hain"	Udit Narayan
5.	"Aaj Mein Upar"	Kavita Krishnamurthy, Kumar Sanu
6.	"Yeh Dil Sun Raha Hain"	Kavita Krishnamurthy
7.	"Saagar Kinare Bhi Do Dil Hain Pyaase"	Udita Narayan, Sulakshana Pandit
8.	"Mausam Ke Sargam Ko Sun"	Kavita Krishnamurthy, Shraddha Pandit
9.	"Shing-A-Linga"	Remo Fernandes
10.	"Huiya Ho"	Remo Fernandes

== Awards and nominations ==
=== 42nd Filmfare Awards ===
Won

- Best Film (Critics) – Sanjay Leela Bhansali
- Best Actress (Critics) – Manisha Koirala
- Best Female Playback Singer – Kavita Krishnamurthy for "Aaj Main Upar"
- Best Art Direction – Nitin Chandrakant Desai
- Best Sound Design – Jitendra Chowdhary

Nominated

- Best Film – Polygram Filmed Entertainment
- Best Actor – Nana Patekar
- Best Actress – Manisha Koirala
- Best Supporting Actress – Helen
- Best Supporting Actress – Seema Biswas
- Best Music Director – Jatin–Lalit
- Best Lyricist – Majrooh Sultanpuri for "Aaj Main Upar"
- Best Female Playback Singer – Alka Yagnik for "Baahon Ke Darmiyaan"

=== Star Screen Awards ===
Won

- Best Actress – Manisha Koirala
- Best Supporting Actress – Seema Biswas
- Best Lyricist – Majrooh Sultanpuri for "Aaj Main Upar"
- Best Female Playback Singer – Kavita Krishnamurthy for "Aaj Main Upar"

== Legacy ==
The film is considered ahead of its time and rated by many as best work of director Sanjay Leela Bhansali. The film features several autobiographical references to life of director Sanjay Leela Bhansali. In the Filmfare magazine Manisha Koirala's performance in the film was included on its Top 80 Iconic Performances list.

The 1996 German film Beyond Silence's narrative is similar to that of Khamoshi. Khamoshi was released on 9 August 1996 and Beyond Silence was released on 19 December 1996, more than four months later.
