= Game (2016 film) =

2016 Indian film by A. M. R. Ramesh

- Theatrical release poster in Kannada
- Directed by: A. M. R. Ramesh
- Written by: A. M. R. Ramesh
- Produced by: A. M. R. Ramesh; Roopa Deshraj
- Starring: Arjun; Shaam; Manisha Koirala
- Cinematography: Sethu Sriram
- Edited by: K. V. Krishna Reddy; C. M. Selvakumar
- Music by: Ilaiyaraaja
- Production company: Akshaya Creations
- Distributed by: Sapphire Movies
- Release dates: 26 February 2016 (Kannada); 1 July 2016 (Tamil)
- Running time: 125 minutes
- Country: India
- Languages: Kannada; Tamil

Game is a 2016 Indian mystery thriller film directed by A. M. R. Ramesh. Shot as a bilingual in Kannada and Tamil languages, the latter as Oru Melliya Kodu (transl. A thin line), it is a remake of the 2012 Spanish film The Body. It features Arjun Sarja, Shaam and Manisha Koirala in the lead roles. With music composed by Ilayaraaja, the Kannada version released first on 26 February 2016 while the Tamil version released on July 1, 2016.

== Plot ==
A man runs away in fear, looking over his shoulder, and is admitted to the hospital after an accident, and is in a coma. DCP Sharat Chandra (Shakthivel in Tamil) is called upon to investigate the matter, where it is found through the security cameras that the corpse of a high-profile businesswoman, Maya, is missing from the morgue. Meanwhile, Maya's husband Akshay is surrounded by family and friends offering condolences, but he drives them out, saying he wants to be left alone. Once they all leave, he drives to his girlfriend Bhoomi's house, where it is revealed that Akshay killed his wife and made it look like a heart attack. The cops call Akshay through his cell phone and ask him to come to the forensics lab and explain the issue. Akshay drinks a glass of wine offered by Bhoomi and leaves. At the lab, he is asked to stay there until they discover the corpse.

In a series of clues and flashbacks, Akshay is made to believe Maya is still alive and out for vengeance. He keeps in contact with Bhoomi until Sharat Chandra receives evidence that can allow him to arrest Akshay, in the form of a toxin BL-18 that can induce a heart attack. It is revealed that Akshay drugged a glass of red wine with BL-18 to kill Maya. Sharat Chandra interrogates Akshay, who reveals how he and Maya met. After being locked up in a room, Akshay calls Bhoomi up and realizes that Maya's lawyer Krishna Prasad is actually a private detective hired by Maya to spy on Akshay. He asks Bhoomi to run away, afraid that Maya is after her. When Bhoomi comes out of the building, a car speeds towards her, and Akshay fears the worst.

Akshay confesses everything to Sharat Chandra and repeatedly requests him to save Bhoomi. Sharat Chandra gets a call from Deva, who tells him that they found a body, revealed to be Maya. Sharat Chandra further confirms that there was no one named Bhoomi in the university and flat as mentioned by Akshay, and that Bhoomi was nonexistent. Akshay tries to escape, tailed by Sharat Chandra. Sharat Chandra then reveals that the car accident in which Sharat Chandra's wife had died was caused by a drunken Akshay and Maya. Although Sharat Chandra's daughter Amritha repeatedly calls for help, Maya tells Akshay to leave them, due to which his wife dies.

Amritha had been in a coma for two years, and when she woke up, she remembered the car license plate, which she tells Ranjith, who tracks them down. It is revealed that Bhoomi is actually Amritha, and it was an elaborate plan orchestrated by Sharat Chandra and Amritha, due to which Maya was killed. Sharat Chandra further reveals that the glass of wine Amritha had offered to Akshay before leaving contained BL-18, and it has been 8 hours since it entered his bloodstream. Akshay dies of a heart attack, and Sharat Chandra walks away from his dead body.

== Cast ==
- Arjun Sarja as Sharat Chandra (Kannada) / Shakthivel (Tamil)
- Shaam as Akshay
- Manisha Koirala as Maya
- Aqsa Bhatt as Bhoomika/Amritha
- Seetha as Dr. Brinda
- Neha Saxena as Sandhya
- A. M. R. Ramesh as Deva

== Production ==
Ramesh had narrated the story to Arjun, who agreed to work on the film and helped contact Manisha Koirala about playing the film's leading female role. Shaam was selected to play the film's main antagonist, a role initially planned to be played by the director himself. Arjun also helped the makers get in touch with composer Ilaiyaraaja to compose two songs for the film. The team shot in Chennai in February 2015, with Oru Melliya Kodu, a dialogue taken from Gautham Vasudev Menon's Yennai Arindhaal (2015), adapted as the film's Tamil title.

In April 2015, actress Khushbu was approached to play Arjun's wife in the film but turned down the offer. The actress later sought a public clarification from the team if the story was based on the death of Indian businesswoman, Sunanda Pushkar, and urged the team to narrate the story with sensitivity. Ramesh, however, refused to confirm Kushboo's allegations and turned down her request of divulging the film's plot to the media. During December 2015, the director revealed that production was complete and that postproduction and censoring works were ongoing.

== Soundtrack ==
Game

Soundtrack album by Ilaiyaraaja
- Released: 2016
- Recorded: Prasad Studios
- Genre: Film soundtrack
- Length: 12:50
- Label: Trend Music
- Producer: Ilaiyaraaja

Ilaiyaraaja chronology
| Oyee (2016) | Game (2016) | Ki & Ka (2016) |

Kannada track listing

All lyrics are written by V. Nagendra Prasad.

| No. | Title | Singer(s) | Length |
|---|---|---|---|
| 1. | "Hoovinda Hoovige Kavana" | Karthik, Priya Himesh | 5:35 |
| 2. | "Ondu Manjina Bindu" | Karthik, Ramya NSK | 5:50 |
| 3. | "Sogasu Sogasu" | Ilaiyaraaja | 1:25 |
| Total length: | | | 12:50 |

Tamil track listing

All lyrics are written by Pa. Vijay.

| No. | Title | Singer(s) | Length |
|---|---|---|---|
| 1. | "Yaar Indha Velvettu" | Karthik, Priya Himesh | 5:35 |
| 2. | "Oru Melliya Kodu" | Karthik, Ramya NSK | 5:50 |
| 3. | "Parandhu Parandhu" | Ilaiyaraaja | 1:25 |
| Total length: | | | 12:50 |

== Release ==
The film was dubbed and released in Telugu as Notuku Potu in 2017.

Kannada version

A critic from The Times of India wrote that "the film is engaging and makes for a good watch" and "This non-linear narrative holds the viewer gripped." A critic from The Hindu wrote "The slow paced narration, which is unusual for Kannada audience, uses sound and visuals to get the needed effect, with Ilayaraja's music score succeeding in creating the mood". A critic from Deccan Herald said that "The film, which boasts of a surprising twist in the climax and a subtle message, has all trademark Ramesh’s style of film making".

Tamil version

A critic from The Times of India wrote that "It is a pity that the film fails to cross that melliya kodu [thin line] between being 'not boring' and 'compelling enough'". A critic from Deccan Chronicle gave the film a rating of two-and-a-half stars and wrote that "Despite few glitches, OMK is worth a watch for its gripping making". A critic from The New Indian Express said that "Though not one of the best scripts to come out in the suspense-crime format, the film could be a one-time watch for lovers of the genre".
