= Khela =

- Directed by: Rituparno Ghosh
- Written by: Rituparno Ghosh
- Produced by: Rituparno Ghosh
- Starring: Prasenjit; Manisha Koirala; Raima Sen; Akashneel Dutta Mukhopadhyay
- Cinematography: Avik Mukhopadhyay
- Edited by: Arghyakamal Mitra
- Music by: Raja Narayan Deb; Sanjoy Das
- Distributed by: Saregama Films
- Release date: 11 July 2008
- Country: India
- Language: Bengali

Khela (Bengali: খেলা "Game") (2008) is a Bengali film by Rituparno Ghosh. The film is about an idealistic director's (Prosenjit Chatterjee) quest to make a film with a boy who he thinks is just perfect for the role. Khela also marks actress Manisha Koirala's foray into Bengali cinema.

== Plot ==
Khela is about an idealistic director's desire to make a film with a boy who he thinks is just perfect for the role. His wife wants a baby and the husband feels that the child will compromise the artiste in him. Here the aspiring but passionate film maker creates a bond with a superb rut of a child and who does feel that a child may spoil his career, started re-discovering a child within him. The film also deals with relationships and emotions but with a twist by adding up humor, adventure and edge-of-the-seat mystery.

== Cast ==
- Prosenjit Chatterjee as Raja
- Manisha Koirala as Sheela
- Raima Sen as Anjali
- Akashneel Dutt Mukherjee as Abhirup
- Bharat Kaul
- Roopa Ganguly (Cameo)

== Reception ==
The film received mixed reviews. The Telegraph(Calcutta) stated that it was "Rituparno’s conscious attempt to break away from the 'adult' tag of Antarmahal and Dosar, and re-connect with the Bangali family." While noted film critic Rajeev Masand said that the film is "Khela is not a bad film, but one that requires much patience on your part", he also appreciated the "fine performances from principals"
