= Tulsi (film) =

Tulsi: Mathrudevobhava
- Poster
- Directed by: K. Ajay Kumar
- Produced by: Padmavati C. H.
- Starring: Manisha Koirala; Irrfan Khan
- Narrated by: K. Ajay Kumar
- Cinematography: Ajay Vincent
- Music by: Nikhil-Vinay
- Distributed by: Sri Tirumala Tirupathi Venkateswara Films
- Release date: 18 January 2008 (India)
- Country: India
- Language: Hindi
- Budget: ₹1 crore
- Box office: ₹1,20 lakh

Tulsi: Mathrudevobhava is a 2008 Indian Hindi language drama film. The film is directed by K. Ajay Kumar and stars Manisha Koirala and Irrfan Khan. The film is a remake of the 1993 Malayalam movie Akashadoothu, which was also earlier remade in Telugu as Mathru Devo Bhava and in Kannada as Karulina Koogu.

== Plot ==
The titular character Tulsi is married to Suraj, a drunkard, and their four kids. One evening, while Suraj is away, his friends try to molest Tulsi. When Suraj gets to know of it, he beats Yashpal black and blue. A furious Yashpal swears revenge. Meanwhile, Tulsi is diagnosed with blood cancer. Yashpal attacks Suraj and murders him. A distraught Tulsi decides to have her kids adopted by different families before she dies.

== Cast ==
- Manisha Koirala as Tulsi
- Irrfan Khan as Suraj
- Sadashiv Amrapurkar as Annoying Foster Father
- Tinu Anand as Foster Father with Crooked Teeth
- Kulbhushan Kharbanda as The Guru
- Yashpal Sharma
- Anjana Mumtaz
- Sahila Chadha
- Arzoo Govitrikar as Dr.Anjali D'souza

== Soundtrack ==
1. "Aasmann Pe Rab Hoga" – Sonu Nigam
2. "Dena O Denewale (Nirbal Ko Bal)" – Shreya Ghoshal
3. "Chhoona Chhapaki" – Udit Narayan, Shreya Ghoshal
4. "Waqt Bewaqt Mausam Badalte" – Vinay-Tiwari
5. "Toote Gharonda Bikre Tinke" – Sonu Nigam
6. "Chale Re Kahaar Le Ke"

== Critical response ==
Taran Adarsh of IndiaFM gave the film 1 star out of 5, writing ″Direction [K. Ajay Kumar] could've been better. Music [Vinay Tiwari] is appealing, but the non-promotion makes the effort go waste. Cinematography [Ajayan Vincent] is first-rate. The lush-green locales are a visual treat. Manisha Koirala sinks her teeth in this role and delivers a fine performance. As always, Irrfan is efficient. Yashpal Sharma is getting typecast. Veteran Vikram does a fine job. Kulbhushan Kharbanda is wasted. The film also stars Sadashiv Amrapurkar, Anjana Mumtaz, Tinnu Anand and his wife and Sahil Chadha. On the whole, TULSI has dim chances. And lack of awareness will go against it!
