= Manisha Koirala =

Nepalese actress (born 1970)

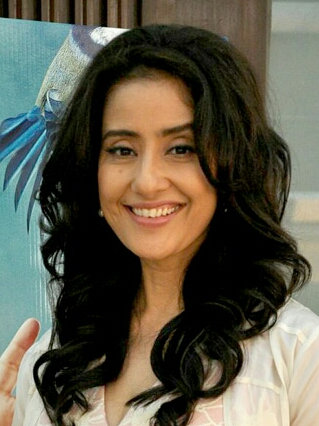
- Koirala in 2017
- Born: 16 August 1970 (age 56); Kathmandu, Nepal
- Occupation: Actress
- Years active: 1989–present
- Works: Full list
- Spouse: Samrat Dahal (m. 2010; div. 2012)
- Father: Prakash Koirala
- Family: Koirala family
- Awards: Full list

Manisha Koirala (born 16 August 1970) is a Nepalese actress who works in Indian cinema, predominantly in Hindi and Tamil films. Born into the politically prominent Koirala family, she is the daughter of Prakash Koirala and the granddaughter of B. P. Koirala. One of the most popular and highest-paid actresses of her time, she is the recipient several accolades, including three Filmfare Awards, one Filmfare Awards South and one Filmfare OTT Award. In 2001, the Government of Nepal awarded her with the Order of Gorkha Dakshina Bahu.

Manisha made her acting debut with the Nepali film Pheri Bhetaula (1989), and later debuted in Indian cinema with the Hindi drama Saudagar (1991). Following a brief setback, she established herself with commercial successes in both Bollywood and Kollywood films, including Bombay (1995), Agni Sakshi (1996), Indian (1996), Gupt: The Hidden Truth (1997), Kachche Dhaage (1999), Mudhalvan (1999) and Company (2002). She also received critical recognition for playing a naive girl in 1942: A Love Story (1994), an ambitious wife in Akele Hum Akele Tum (1995), the daughter of deaf-mute parents in Khamoshi: The Musical (1996), a terrorist in Dil Se.. (1998) and a mistreated woman in Lajja (2001).

Over the course of the next decade, she garnered praise for her performances in several unconventional and art-house films, such as the survival drama Escape From Taliban (2003), the Malayalam psychological drama Elektra (2010), and the anthology film I Am (2010). In 2012, Koirala took a break from acting after being diagnosed with last stage ovarian cancer and underwent an year-long treatment, making a successful recovery by mid-2014. She returned with the coming-of-age drama Dear Maya (2017), followed by her portrayal of actress Nargis in Sanju (2018). The same year Koirala featured in the Netflix production Lust Stories. She has since starred in the period drama series Heeramandi: The Diamond Bazaar (2024).

In addition to acting in films, Koirala was appointed as the Goodwill Ambassador for the United Nations Population Fund in 1999 for India and 2015 for Nepal, and was involved in the relief works after the April 2015 Nepal earthquake. She also contributed as an author to the novel Healed: How Cancer Gave Me a New Life; which is an account of her struggle with ovarian cancer.

== Early life ==
Manisha Koirala is a Hindu. She was born on 16 August 1970 into the politically prominent Koirala family, in Kathmandu, Nepal. Her father, Prakash Koirala, is a politician, former Cabinet minister and a former member of Nepal’s House of Representatives, while her mother, Sushma Koirala, is a homemaker. Koirala has one brother, Siddharth Koirala, who is also a Bollywood actor. Her grandfather, Bishweshwar Prasad Koirala, was the prime minister of Nepal during the late 1950s to the early 1960s, as were two of her great-uncles, Girija Prasad Koirala and Matrika Prasad Koirala.

Koirala spent her early life in India. She stayed in Varanasi at her maternal grandmother's home for some years and later in Delhi and Mumbai. While at home in Varanasi, she attended the Vasant Kanya Mahavidyalaya until Class X. Aspiring to become a doctor, she moved to Delhi and studied at the Army Public School (APS) of the Dhaula Kuan, New Delhi campus. In an interview, she said that living on her own in Delhi helped her become "strong and independent." Determined to pursue a career in acting, Koirala later moved to Mumbai for film roles.

== Career ==
=== Debut and breakthrough (1989–1994) ===
During a break after her class X board exams, Koirala acted in the 1989 Nepali film Pheri Bhetaula as an experiment. She also took on a few modeling assignments during her time in Delhi, but later shifted her focus toward acting. One of these was for a wool company.

In 1991, Koirala made her Hindi film debut with Subhash Ghai's directorial Saudagar, which emerged as a commercial success. According to Sukanya Verma of Rediff.com, "[C]ritics saw sparks in Manisha, even as she was constantly referred to as Madhuri Dixit's lookalike". Yalgaar (1992), did well at the box-office and was classified as a hit. However, this was trailed by a series of films that performed poorly at the box office, including First Love Letter (1991), Anmol and Dhanwan (both 1993), which led to Koirala being labeled "a jinx" by producers.

Koirala's career prospects improved after starring in Vidhu Vinod Chopra's romance film 1942: A Love Story (1994), set during the Indian independence movement. Chopra initially dismissed Koirala as a "terrible actress" after her first screen test, but was impressed with her performance for a second audition and decided to cast her in place of Madhuri Dixit. In the film, Koirala played Rajjo, the daughter of a freedom fighter who falls in love with Naren (Anil Kapoor), the apolitical son of a British colonial employee. The film featured the protagonists sharing a deep kiss; it was certified U/A (Parental guidance required) by the Central Board of Film Certification, becoming the first Indian film to receive the rating. Koirala's performance received positive reviews, with critics hailing her as "a sensitive performer". The film proved to be a box office flop. However, it fetched Koirala her first nomination for Best Actress at the annual Filmfare Awards ceremony.

=== Critical acclaim and mainstream recognition (1995–2002) ===
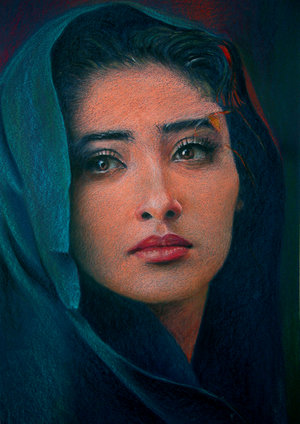
Koirala's portrait by an independent artist, inspired by her appearance in Bombay (1995)

In 1995, Koirala made her debut in Tamil cinema with the Mani Ratnam-directed political romance Bombay, starring alongside Arvind Swami. She took up the role on the insistence of her friend Ashok Mehta, at a time when other contemporaries urged her to not act in non Hindi film industries. It received critical acclaim, with American critic James Berardinelli writing, "Bombay recalls how forceful a motion picture can be. It also reminds us of the maxim that those who don't learn from history are doomed to repeat it". For playing a Muslim who marries a Hindu journalist against the backdrop of the Bombay riots in the eponymous film, at the 43rd Filmfare Awards South, she received her first Award in the Best Actress – Tamil category. Koirala's performances in 1942: A Love Story and Bombay proved to be milestones in her career, and marked her breakthrough in the film industry. The same year, she featured in the musical romance Akele Hum Akele Tum opposite Aamir Khan a remake of 1979 American film Kramer vs. Kramer starring Dustin Hoffman and Meryl Streep, and received her second nomination in the Best Actress category at the Filmfare Awards. Later in 1995, Koirala starred opposite Sunny Deol in the action love story Dushmani: A Violent Love Story and the film turned out to be an average grosser.

The following year, she played a battered wife on the run from her mentally-ill husband in the drama Agni Sakshi, a remake of the Julia Roberts-starrer Sleeping with the Enemy (1991), which begot her positive reviews for her performance. The film was released in close succession with two other remakes of the same film –Yaraana (1995) and Daraar (1996) and was a commercial success, emerging as the second highest-grossing film of the year in India. Later she featured opposite Salman Khan in the comedy Majhdhaar the same year, which was both a critical and commercial failure. She then played a starring role in S. Shankar's Indian (1996), which marked her second Tamil film. It was also dubbed and released in Hindi under the title Hindustani. Featuring Kamal Haasan in dual roles alongside Koirala, Urmila Matondkar and Sukanya, it was the most expensive Indian film at that time, with a budget of ₹150 million. Both Indian and Hindustani were commercial successes.

In her last release of 1996, she acted in the musical drama Khamoshi: The Musical, which marked Sanjay Leela Bhansali's directorial debut. Koirala played Annie, a caring daughter to her deaf-mute parents Joseph and Flavy, portrayed by Nana Patekar and Seema Biswas respectively; Salman Khan played Raj, her love interest. In preparation for her role, Koirala learned the Indian Sign Language. A critic from Channel 4 wrote, "Koirala in particular is in her element and demonstrates the full range of her acting ability, rather than playing against it as she has had to do in more traditional films". Despite receiving critical acclaim, Khamoshi: The Musical was a flop. Filmfare included her performance among a list of "80 Iconic Performances" of Indian cinema in 2011. In a box office roundup of the year, The Indian Express felt Koirala put up an "impressive show" with her successes. Her performance in Khamoshi earned her a second Filmfare Award for Best Performance and a nomination for Best Actress. She also received her only win for Best Actress at the Screen Awards. The following year, she played the leading role alongside Kajol and Bobby Deol in the thriller Gupt: The Hidden Truth, which was one of the biggest hits that year but her other films in the year were unsuccessful.

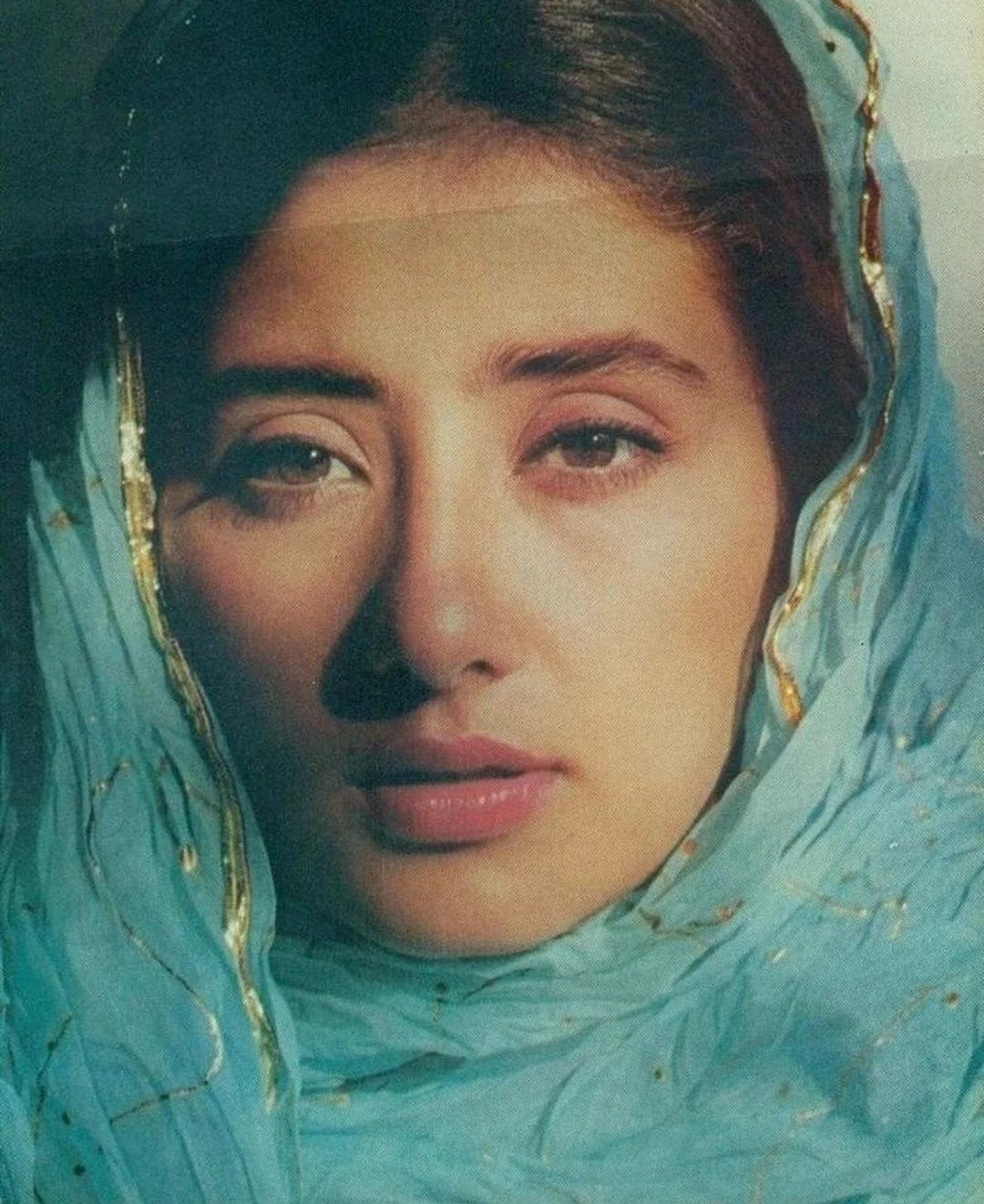
Koirala's photograph from Dil Se.. (1998)

In 1998, she went on to collaborate once again with the acclaimed director Mani Ratnam, and starred in his film Dil Se.. opposite Shah Rukh Khan. Her role received similarly good reviews and earned her several award nominations including the Filmfare Best Actress Award nomination. The film proved to be a hit overseas. The film became the first Indian film to enter the top 10 in the United Kingdom box office charts. Even months after its release in September 1998, the film was still screened on five screens, five times per day with an average of 3,000 spectators across all screens in the Cineworld complex in Feltham, West London. Koirala later played the leading role opposite to Govinda in the movie Maharaja.

In 1999, she starred in the successful Kachche Dhaage, which was followed by six more releases, the most notable of them being Indra Kumar's drama Mann, remake of 1957 Hollywood classic An Affair to Remember, which entered into the top five highest-grossing films of the year. Her performance in the film won her favourable reviews. Film critic M. Ali Ikram wrote about her performance: "If there is a respite for Manisha's innumerable fans of late, this flick is it. We may not care about hits and flops, but it is painful to watch this acting virtuoso in the innumerable side roles she has been seen in of late. Indra Kumar's decision to cast Manisha here is a case of perfect casting, and she never lets him or the audience down. This lady is truly the Meena Kumari of her generation. It is great fun watching Manisha and Aamir Khan's perfect chemistry opposite one another. The film's climax has both stars permanently molding a spot for themselves in Bollywood history, and it will have you shedding tears by the bucketful." It was a successful feature at the box office. While filming Laawaris (1999), Koirala began to get tired of her busy schedule and felt "the pressure getting to [her]"; she turned to alcohol for solace and developed anger issues. She also reunited with S.Shankar for Mudhalvan (1999) which went on to become one of the highest grossers of Tamil Nadu that year.

In 2000, Koirala starred in four films including action dramas Champion opposite Sunny Deol and Baaghi opposite Sanjay Dutt, but none of the films became major successes. The same year, she debuted on television and hosted the reality game show titled Sawaal Dus Crore Ka on Zee TV alongside Anupam Kher. Both anchors were later replaced due to poor performance of the show. Koirala was extremely hurt and upset for being made the scapegoat and blamed the poor production quality on the sets.

In 2001, she starred in the drama Grahan opposite Jackie Shroff. Her portrayal of a rape victim in the film who seeks justice was appreciated, but the film, which was a much-delayed project, was a major commercial failure. After starring in moderately successful Chhupa Rustam: A Musical Thriller she next played the protagonist in Rajkumar Santoshi's drama Lajja, along with an ensemble cast that included Rekha, Anil Kapoor and Madhuri Dixit. The film received a positive reception from critics, and so did Koirala's performance. Her last release of the year was Moksha, opposite Arjun Rampal, which was a failure at the box office.

In 2002, she starred opposite Ajay Devgan in Ram Gopal Verma's Company. The film was a critical success and she won her third Filmfare Critics' Best Actress Award. She was then seen as the main lead in Rajkumar Kohli's fantasy action-thriller Jaani Dushman: Ek Anokhi Kahani. The film opened to extremely negative reviews and was a box office flop. In that same year, Koirala also appeared in Ek Chotisi Love Story. The film, when released, generated good response at the box office, becoming one of the few successes of the year. The movie's release was stayed as she accused the director of the film, Shashilal Nair, of using her body double to shoot some love scenes in the film, and portraying her in bad light by shooting positions using another actress in her place, without her approval. A court finally decided to stay the release of the film.

=== Transiton to art-house cinema (2003–2010) ===
From 2003 onward, Koirala, known for balancing mainstream and offbeat roles, began gravitating more toward art-house cinema, marking a phase that, despite occasional critical recognition, proved largely unsuccessful at the box office. She appeared in films such as Escape From Taliban (2003), which earned her the BFJA Award for Best Actress, and Market (2003), which depicts the life of a young prostitute and performed moderately at the box office.

After receiving a diploma in filmmaking in New York in 2004, Koirala made her debut as a producer with the small-budget caper comedy Paisa Vasool, starring her alongside Sushmita Sen. In the same year, she also acted in the thriller Tum - A Dangerous Obsession, though both ventures failed at the box office. In the following year, Koirala then starred in various unsuccessful films such as the historical epic drama Taj Mahal: An Eternal Love Story, the horror film Anjaane – The Unknown and the black comedy Mumbai Express, which was simulaneously shot in both Hindi and Tamil and was also the first Indian censored film to be filmed in digital format.

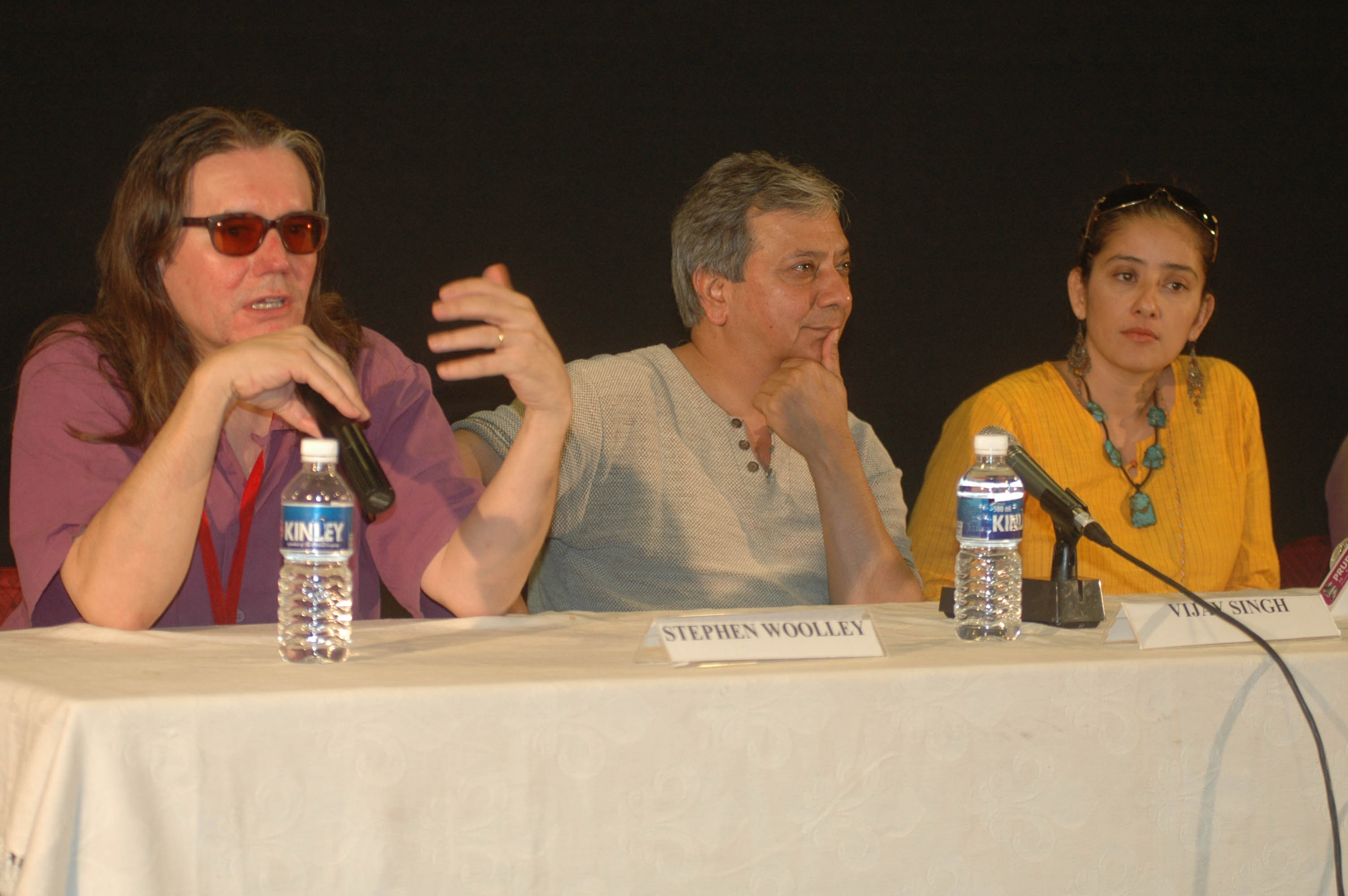
Koirala at the 37th International Film Festival of India in 2006.

Koirala’s setbacks continued in 2006 with the black comedy Darwaaza Bandh Rakho, in which she had a supporting role and which failed commercially. A year later, she appeared again in a supporting role in the romantic thriller Anwar, starring her brother Siddharth Koirala. Although the film was a commercial failure, its music became one of the most popular soundtracks of the year.

In 2008, Koirala starred opposite Irrfan Khan in the family drama Tulsi, in her first leading role since Mumbai Express (2005). Before its release, her role was described by the media as a "shocking comeback" but the film suffered from poor marketing. Although Koirala's performance as Tulsi, a young homemaker diagnosed with leukemia, was well received. Taran Adarsh from IndiaFM wrote: "Manisha Koirala sinks her teeth in this role and delivers a fine performance." She next starred in Sirf (2008) which was a critical and box office failure. The same year, she acted in her first Bengali film Khela, directed by Rituparno Ghosh, which released on the same day with her long-delayed Hindi film Mehbooba.

In 2009, Koirala starred in Deepti Naval's directorial debut Do Paise Ki Dhoop, Char Aane Ki Barish which premiered at the market section of the 2009 Cannes Film Festival to a positive response.

In 2010, Koirala made her foray into Malayalam cinema with Shyamaprasad's Elektra, a psycho-sensual drama based on Sophocles's ancient Greek tragic play Electra. She plays the antagonist in the film, which revolves around the concept of the Electra complex, which is a daughter's psychosexual competition with her mother for her father's affection. The film premiered at the International Film Festival of India, where it was well received. The same year, Koirala acted in her native Nepali-language film, Dharmaa, after a gap of 22 years since her first film.

In Hindi, she was seen in director Onir's critically acclaimed anthology film I Am, sharing the screen with Juhi Chawla, with its world premiere at the I View Film Festival in New York City. The film released theatrically worldwide a year later to positive reviews. Film critic Taran Adarsh noted, "It's a delight to watch Juhi and Manisha, after a hiatus. Both deliver striking performances – even getting the language right." Koirala was also seen in Partho Ghosh's Ek Second... Jo Zindagi Badal De? in the same year.

=== Intermittent work and hiatus (2011–2016) ===
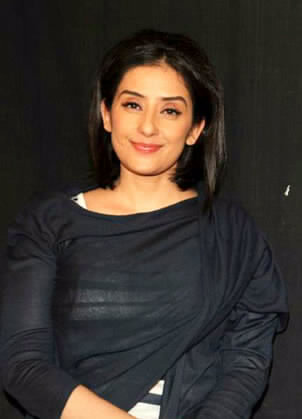
Koirala during the promotion of her film Bhoot Returns in 2012

In 2011, Koirala made her comeback to Tamil cinema after five years with Mappillai, a remake of the 1989 film of the same name. The film saw her reprising the role originally played by Srividya. Her performance earned her a nomination at the Filmfare Award for Best Supporting Actress – Tamil and the film was declared a hit.

In 2012, Koirala collaborated with director Ram Gopal Verma for his 3D horror film Bhoot Returns, a spiritual sequel to the 2003 hit Bhoot. It was deemed to be yet another comeback for Koirala, however she refused to call it a comeback because she had not been away from films for a long time. Despite the good initial response to its promos and trailers, the film turned out to be a critical and commercial failure.

Koirala then took a sabbatical due to her diagnosis and treatment for ovarian cancer. Her long-delayed psychological thriller Chehere: A Modern Day Classic, co-starring Divya Dutta, released theatrically in 2015 but failed to make any impact at the box office or with critics.

Three years later since Bhoot Returns, she appeared in the 2016 bilingual mystery thriller film Game, directed by A. M. R. Ramesh. The Kannada version released first in February, followed by its Tamil release in July of the same year. The film received mixed reviews in both markets and went largely unnoticed. She was also seen in the Malyalam film Edavappathy in the same year.

=== Renewed career and streaming projects (2017–present) ===
In 2017, Koirala returned to Bollywood with the drama Dear Maya. Directed by Sunaina Bhatnagar and co-starring Madiha Imam, her role was of a middle-aged lonely woman who embarks on a journey to find love when she receives love letters. The film received mixed reviews from critics with praise directed to Koirala's performance. Sweta Kaushal of Hindustan Times said: "Manisha Koirala shines like a diamond in a coal mine." Suhani Singh from India Today noted that she is the "star in this mawkish coming-of-age story", while Stutee Ghosh of The Quint wrote that "Manisha Koirala's grace makes it worth a watch."

In 2018, Koirala featured in one of the segments directed by Dibakar Banerjee in the Netflix anthology Lust Stories, where she played a middle-aged housewife, having an extra-marital affair with her husband's best friend. The film was nominated for International Emmy Award for Best TV Movie or Miniseries, and Koirala's performance was also appreciated. This was followed by an appearance in Sanju (2018), a biographical film directed by Rajkumar Hirani, based on the life of Koirala's frequent co-star Sanjay Dutt, with Ranbir Kapoor in the titular role. Koirala portrayed veteran actress Nargis, Dutt’s mother. The film emerged as the highest-grossing film of the year, with praises for Koirala's performance in the film.

In 2019, Koirala featured in Prasthanam, a Hindi remake of the Telugu language political thriller with the same title, in which she played Sanjay Dutt's wife. Her much delayed film Do Paise Ki Dhoop, Chaar Aane Ki Baarish also released on Netflix this year. She followed this by working in another Netflix original Maska, directed by Neeraj Udhwani. It started streaming on the platform during the COVID-19 pandemic in 2020.

In 2021, Koirala appeared in AR Rahman's romantic musical 99 Songs. She then starred in an American comedy film India Sweets and Spices, directed by Geeta Malik. The film is based on Geeta Malik's own script “Dinner With Friends” that won the 2016 Academy Nicholl Fellowships in screen-writing.

In 2023, Koirala appeared in the action-drama Shehzada, starring Kartik Aryan and Kriti Sanon. A remake of the Telugu film Ala Vaikunthapurramuloo (2020), Koirala played the role of Aryan’s mother, a role originally portrayed by Tabu in the original. Koirala's performance was appreciated, although the film was a commercial failure.

In 2024, Koirala played the chief courtesan Mallikajaan in Sanjay Leela Bhansali's web series Heeramandi, that streamed on Netflix. Nandini Ramnath of Scroll.in noted, "Manisha Koirala, sporting a deep voice and her nastiest manner, gives a near-parodic role her best shot. But she is hard-pressed to portray Mallikajaan’s campy tendencies." She won a Filmfare OTT award for Best Actor, Series (Female): Drama for the role.

== Off-screen work ==
=== Social and humanitarian work ===
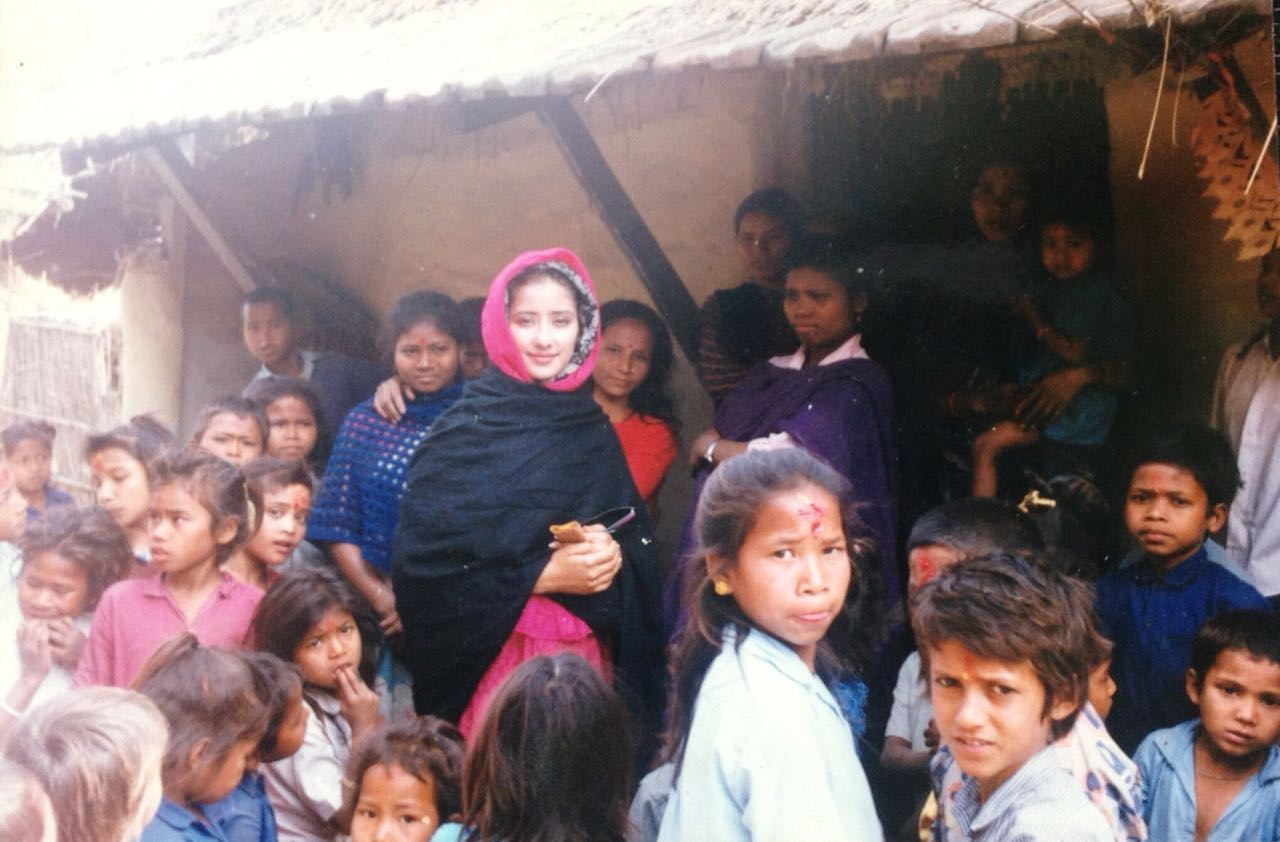
Koirala in 2015, as a UNFPA Goodwill Ambassador at a program in Nepal

Koirala is actively involved in social work, specifically working with organisations to promote women's rights, prevention of violence against women, and also to prevent the human trafficking of Nepali girls for prostitution. Her social activism and achievements in movies has made her one of the most famous Nepalis in the world.

In September 1999, she was appointed as a UNFPA Goodwill Ambassador for India. Years later, she was appointed as a UNFPA Goodwill Ambassador for Nepal in 2015 and was involved in the relief works after the Nepal earthquake 2015.

Over the years, Koirala has spoken as a motivational speaker, and given talks on various other topics at schools, hospitals and organisations. She gave speeches in 2016 on "Transformation" at Mercedes-Benz India in Pune, and on "Importance of Being Mindful Living" at Cipla in Goa. She has also advocated the need for an official Earth Anthem for the planet supporting the efforts of Indian poet-diplomat Abhay K in this direction. In 2017, she was appointed as Goodwill Ambassador by Nepal’s Ministry of Urban Development for Bagmati Cleanup Mega Campaign aimed at cleaning the Bagmati River.

In the 2022 Nepalese general election, she supported the pro-monarchy Rashtriya Prajatantra Party, citing the historic respect between her grandfather BP Koirala and the monarchy.

=== Cancer awareness ===
After overcoming cancer, Koirala has become actively involved in spreading awareness about the disease. In her first interview since undergoing cancer treatment in May 2013, she said, "All I want to do from now onwards is to be useful to people who could need a little advice," noting that she intended to use her celebrity and personal experience to inspire others battling the disease.

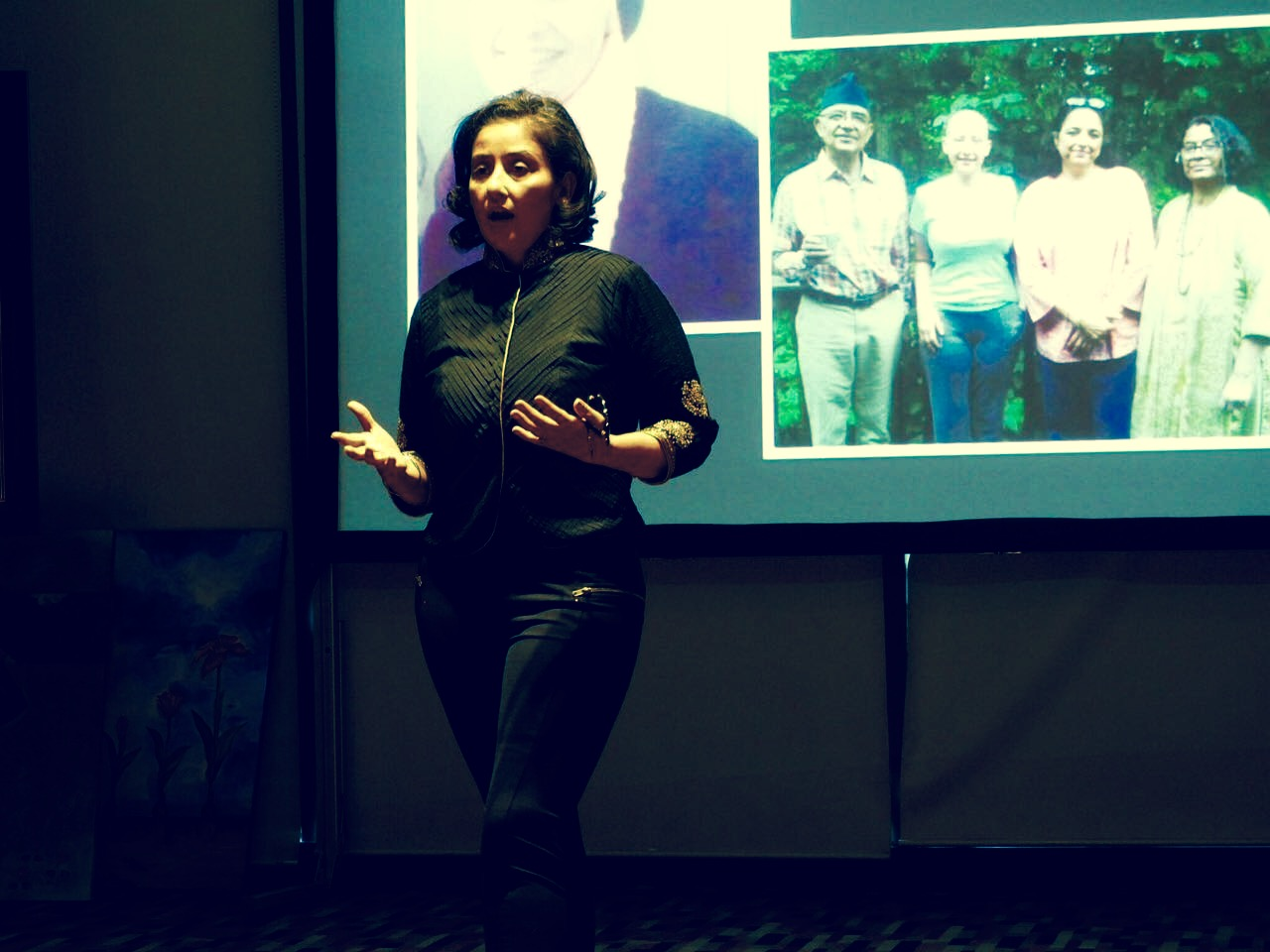
Koirala delivering a motivational speech at a private event in 2016, sharing her experience as a cancer survivor.

Koirala has spoken on "Health is Our Responsibility" at Sneh Foundation in February 2017; on "Cancer is Conquerable" at Apollo Hospitals in Hyderabad; and on "My Life's Lesson" at Shiv Nadar Foundation in Chennai; on "Why Celebrities Need Coaching" in Delhi; on "Woman Empowerment" at National Women's Parliament in Vijayawada; and on "Gifts of Cancer" at TEDx Jaipur.

In addition to actively advocating for cancer patients and survivors through events and talks, Koirala also authored the book "Healed: How Cancer Gave Me a New Life", documenting her journey through the disease and recovery. In her memoir, co-written with Neelam Kumar, Koirala delved into the painful memories of her illness. She stated that, "My book is a result of intense soul-searching. I have plunged deep into the dark, bottomless pit of painful memories and woven a story out of them."

In 2020, she launched "Manisha Koirala Cancer Education Fund" with the support of Global College International, Kathmandu to give educational scholarships to children of cancer victim or survivors with poor financial background.

== Personal life ==
During the production of Agni Sakshi (1996), Koirala allegedly began dating her co-star Nana Patekar; Patekar confirmed their relationship and eventual breakup in 2003.

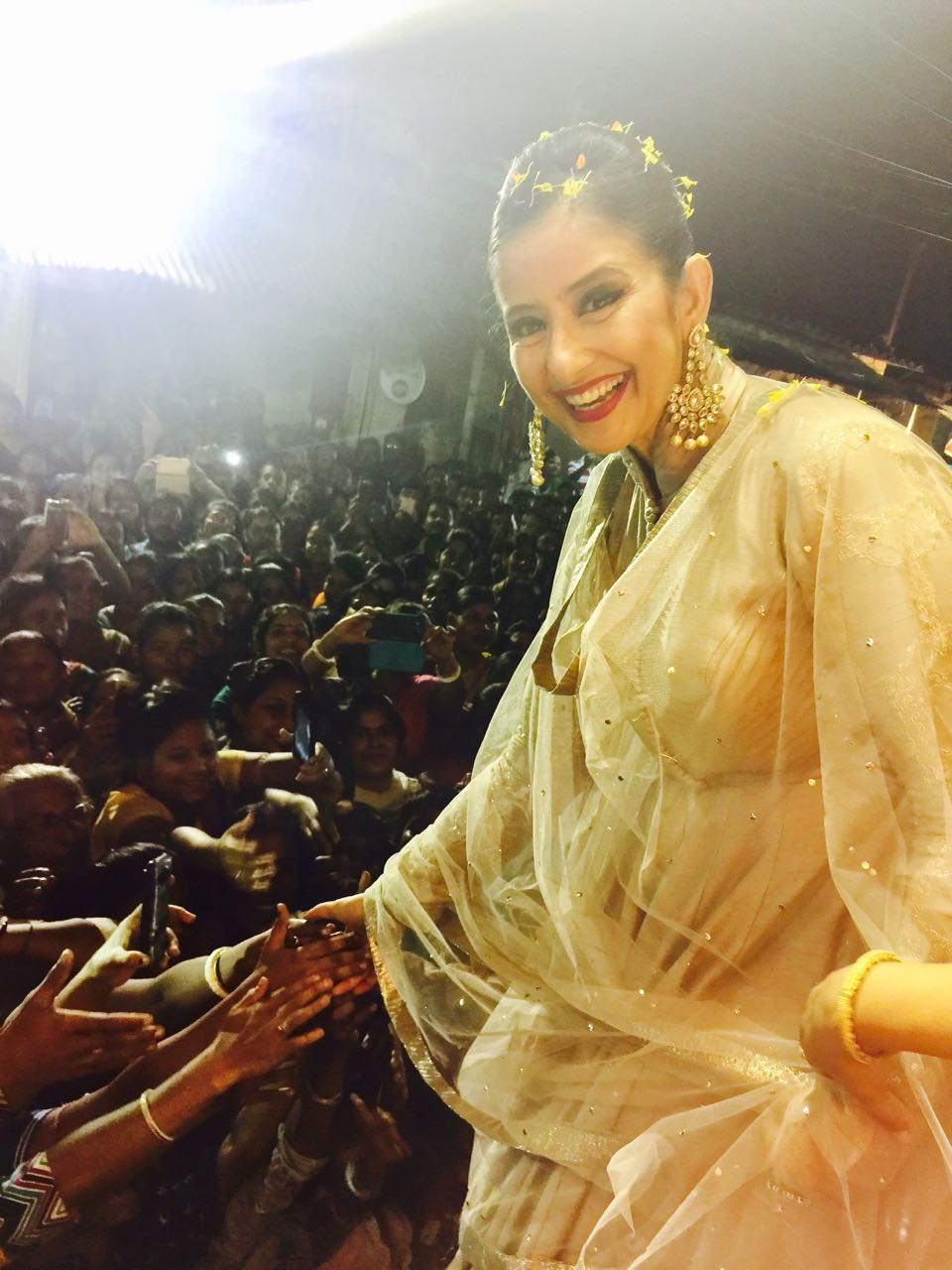
Koirala at an event in Nepal in 2016

In 2004, Koirala moved to New York City and earned a diploma in filmmaking from New York University. While living in New York, she became a member of an independent documentary filmmakers' society.

On 19 June 2010, Koirala married Samrat Dahal, a Nepali businessman, in a traditional ceremony held in Kathmandu. The couple spent their honeymoon in Finland. They met through the online social networking website Facebook. The couple divorced in 2012.

On 29 November 2012, media news reported that Koirala had been diagnosed with ovarian cancer. She had no clue about the disease until she felt weak, and went to a hospital in Kathmandu with her brother. She flew to India and was admitted to Jaslok Hospital in Mumbai. Koirala later flew to the United States for her treatment at the Memorial Sloan-Kettering Cancer Centre, however the exact ailment was not disclosed. On 10 December, she underwent surgery. The following day it was reported that the surgery had been successful. She had to undergo chemotherapy and spent months at the hospital in New York.

In May 2014, it was reported that Koirala had been cancer-free for a year, marking a significant milestone in her recovery. She documented her entire cancer battle in her book, Healed, that she co-authored.

Koirala also supports the restoration of a constitutional monarchy in Nepal.

== Accolades ==
=== Awards and nominations ===
Year	Award	Category	Work	Result	Ref.
1992	Filmfare Awards	Best Female Debut	Saudagar	Nominated	
1995	Filmfare Awards	Best Actress	1942: A Love Story	Nominated	
1996	Filmfare Awards	Best Actress	Akele Hum Akele Tum	Nominated	
1996	Filmfare Awards	Best Actress (Critics)	Bombay	Won	
1996	Filmfare Awards South	Best Actress - Tamil	Bombay	Won	
1996	Cinema Express Awards	Best Actress (Special Award)	Bombay	Won	
1997	Filmfare Awards	Best Actress (Critics)	Khamoshi: The Musical	Won	
1997	Filmfare Awards	Best Actress	Khamoshi: The Musical	Nominated	
1997	Screen Awards	Best Actress	Khamoshi: The Musical	Won	
1999	Screen Awards	Best Actress	Dil Se..	Nominated	
1999	Filmfare Awards	Best Actress	Dil Se..	Nominated	
2003	Filmfare Awards	Best Actress (Critics) (Note: Tied with Rani Mukerji for Saathiya)	Company	Won	
2004	BFJA awards	Best Actress	Escape From Taliban	Won	
2012	Filmfare Awards South	Best Supporting Actress - Tamil	Mappillai	Nominated	
2024	Filmfare OTT Awards	Best Actress (Drama Series)	Heeramandi: The Diamond Bazaar	Won	
2024	Indian Television Academy Awards	Best Actress - OTT (Popular)	Heeramandi: The Diamond Bazaar	Won	

=== Honours and recognition ===
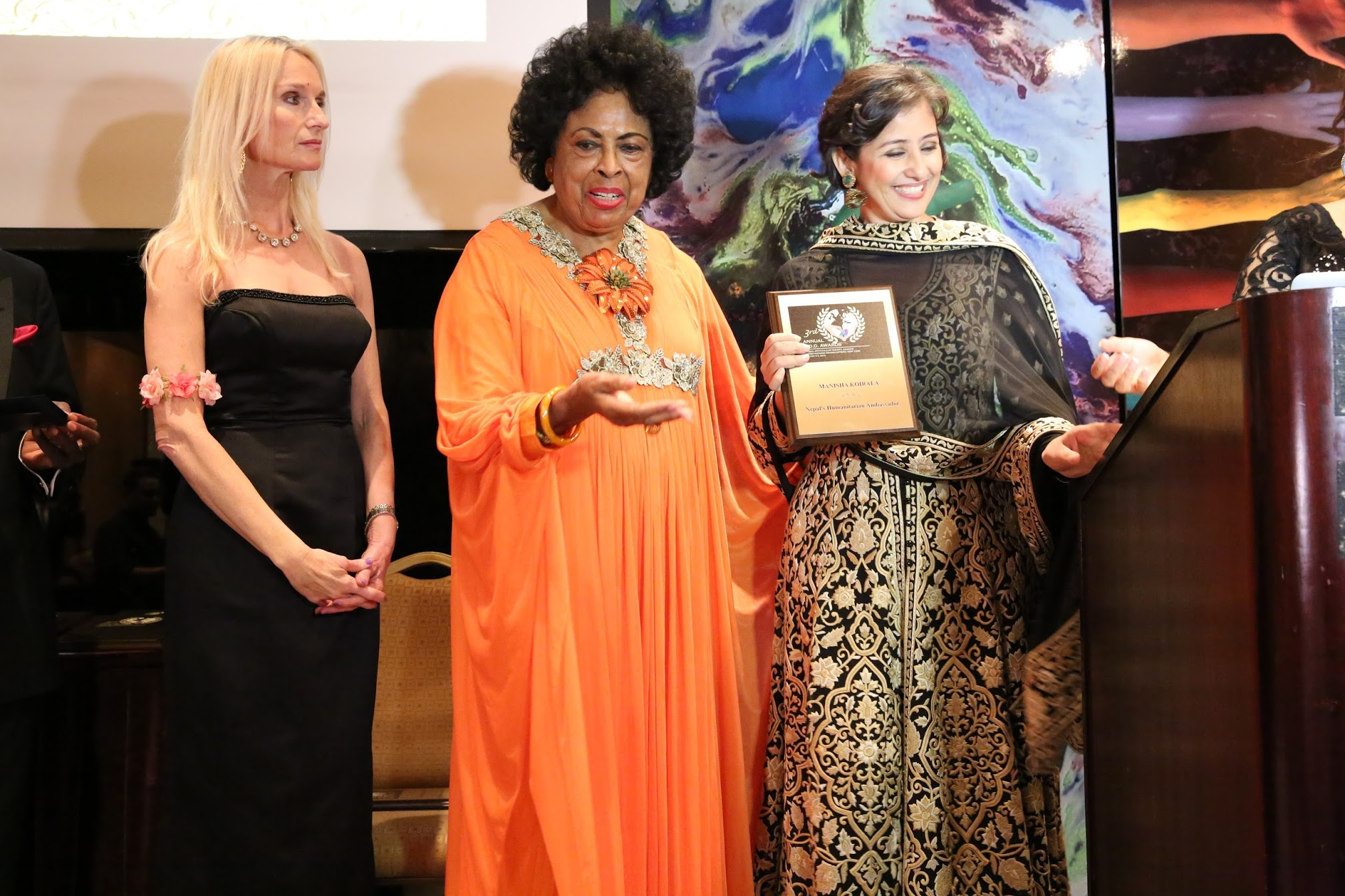
Koirala honored as 'Nepal's Humanitarian Ambassador' by Diane Watson (middle) at the Global Officials of Dignity Awards in 2015

- 1994, Priyadarshini Academy - Smita Patil Memorial Award
- 1999, United Nations Population Fund - Goodwill Ambassador for India
- 2001, Order of Gorkha Dakshina Bahu Honoured by the Government of Nepal for achievement in the Indian Film Industry
- 2003, 1st Non-Resident Nepali Conference, Kathmandu - Letter of Felicitation presented by King of Nepal
- 2006, World Hindu Federation - Letter of Appreciation
- 2014, India Today Woman Summit- Woman of the Year Award
- 2015, London Indian Film Festival - Spirit of Inspiration Award
- 2015, Global Officials of Dignity Award - Nepal's humanitarian ambassador
- 2015, United Nations Population Fund - Goodwill Ambassador for Nepal
- 2017, Navbharat Times Award for Contribution to Indian Cinema
- 2018, Muscat International Film Festival, Oman - Felicitation by Oman Film Society
- 2019, Mahindra Udaya Festival - Excellence in Social Cause
- 2019, Society Pride of India Honour
- 2022, Spandan Global Indo-Nepal Art Festival, Kathmandu - Lifetime Achievement Award
- 2022, Garhwal Post Silver Jubilee Awards - Lifetime Achievement Award presented by the governor of Maharashtra
- 2023, Honoured at a special function held at British Parliament for contribution to Bollywood and South Indian movies
- 2023, Kalinga Literary Festival, Nepal - Yasashwi Sahitya Samman
- 2024, Sanskriti Cultural Foundation, Chennai - Sanskriti Kalashree Award
- 2025, University of Bradford, United Kingdom bestowed on her an Honorary Doctorate degree.
