= Nana Patekar filmography =

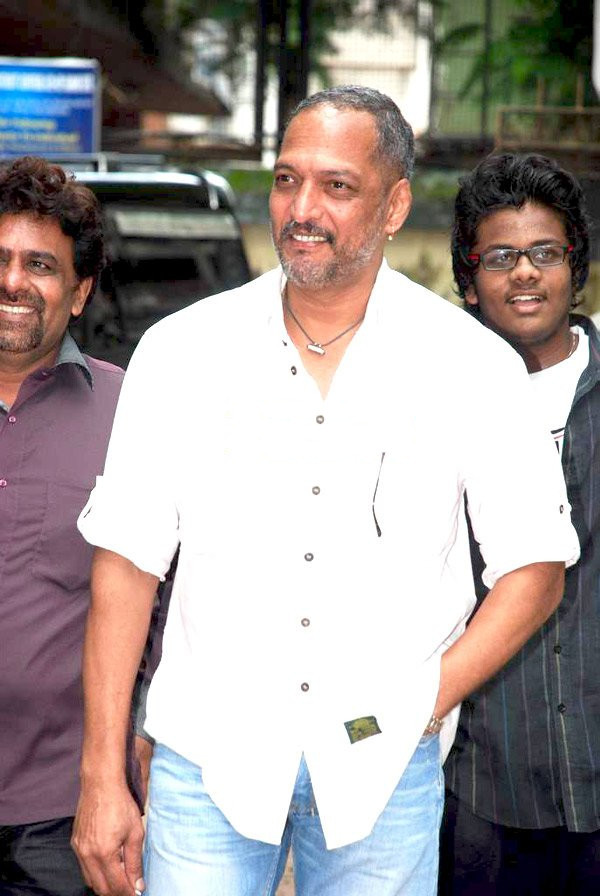
Patekar in 2011

Nana Patekar (1 January 1951 – 8 October 2026) was an Indian actor, writer, and film maker, mainly working in Hindi and Marathi cinema.

As an actor, he was best known for his role in the film Agni Sakshi, for which he won the National Film Award for Best Supporting Actor. He won another National Film Award for Best Supporting Actor, and the Filmfare Award for Best Supporting Actor, for his role in Parinda (1989). He then won the Filmfare Best Villain Award for his role in Angaar (1992). In 1995, he won the National Film Award for Best Actor as well as the Filmfare and the Screen awards for Best Actor for his role in Krantiveer (1994). He also won his second Filmfare Best Villain Award for his role in Apaharan (2005). In 2017 he won the Filmfare Marathi award for best actor for his performance in Natsamrat.

After making his acting debut in Bollywood with the 1978 drama Mimagaman, Patekar acted in a few Marathi films and some Bollywood films. After these roles, he achieved his breakthrough starring as a gangster in Parinda (1989), for which he won the National Film Award and the Filmfare Award for Best Supporting Actor. Later, he acted in and made his directorial debut with Prahaar: The Final Attack (1994). Patekar subsequently starred in and received critical acclaim for his performance in several commercially successful films of the 1990s, including Raju Ban Gaya Gentleman (1992); Angaar (1992), for which he won the Filmfare Award for Best Villain; Tirangaa (1993); Krantiveer (1994), for which he won the National Film Award and the Filmfare Award for Best Actor; Agni Sakshi (1996), for which he won his second National Film Award for Best Supporting Actor; and Khamoshi: The Musical (1996). During the early 2000s, he received praise for his performances in Shakti: The Power (2002) and Apaharan (2005); the latter earned him a second Best Villain award at Filmfare. Patekar's highest-grossing film releases came when he played a gangster in the comedy Welcome (2007) and its sequel Welcome Back (2015), and a politician in the political thriller Raajneeti (2010). In 2016, he starred in the Marathi film Natsamrat. He made his Tamil debut with the bilingual Bommalattam (2008) before starring in Kaala (2018).

== Films ==
Year	Title	Role	Language	Notes	Ref(s)
1978	Gaman	Vasu	Hindi		
1979	Sinhasan	Smuggler	Marathi	Supporting role	
1980	Bhalu	Rangarao	Marathi		
1982	Raghu Maina	Raghu	Marathi		
1983	Savitri	Baban	Marathi		
1984	Aaj Ki Awaaz	Jagmohandas	Hindi		
1984	Giddh	Veerappan	Hindi		
1985	Gad Jejuri Jejuri	Khandu	Marathi		
1986	Ankush	Ravindra Kelkar 'Ravi'	Hindi		
1986	Maaficha Sakshidar	Raghavendra	Marathi		
1986	Phansi Ka Phanda	Raghvendra	Hindi		
1987	Sheela	—N/a	Hindi		
1987	Sutradhar	Kumar	Hindi		
1987	Mohre	Abdul	Hindi		
1987	Andha Yudh	S.P. Suhas Dandekar	Hindi		
1987	Pratighaat	Ex-Constable Karamveer	Hindi		
1987	Awam	Colonel Mustafa Ali Zahidi	Hindi		
1988	Trishagni	Uchanda	Hindi		
1988	Sagar Sangam	Ramnath Shastri / Ramu Ustad	Hindi		
1988	Salaam Bombay!	Baba	Hindi		
1988	Aaj Ka Robin Hood	Ramdulaare S. Jadhav	Hindi		
1990	Parinda	Anna Seth	Hindi		
1990	Thodasa Roomani Ho Jaayen	Natwarlal	Hindi		
1990	Disha	Vasant D. Mandre	Hindi		
1991	Prahaar: The Final Attack	Major Chauhan	Hindi	Also director and screenwriter	
1991	Diksha	Koga Pandit	Hindi		
1992	Raju Ban Gaya Gentleman	Jai	Hindi		
1992	Angaar	Majid Khan	Hindi		
1993	Tirangaa	Shivajirao Wagle	Hindi		
1994	Krantiveer	Pratap Narayan Tilak	Hindi		
1994	Abhay	Ghost	Hindi		
1995	Hum Dono	Vishal Saigal	Hindi		
1996	Agni Sakshi	Vishwanath	Hindi		
1996	Khamoshi: The Musical	Joseph Braganza	Hindi		
1997	Ghulam-E-Mustafa	Ghulam-E-Mustafa	Hindi		
1997	Yeshwant	Yeshwant Lohar	Hindi		
1998	Yugpurush	Anirudh	Hindi		
1998	Wajood	Malhar Gopaldas Agnihotri/Col. Latti	Hindi		
1999	Hu Tu Tu	Bhau	Hindi		
1999	Kohram	Maj. Ajit Arya	Hindi		
2000	Gang	Abdul	Hindi		
2000	Tarkieb	CBI Inspector Jasraj Patel	Hindi		
2002	Vadh	Dr. Arjun Singh	Hindi		
2002	Shakti: The Power	Narasimha	Hindi		
2003	Bhoot	Inspector Liyaqat Qureshi	Hindi		
2003	Darna Mana Hai	John Rodrigues	Hindi	Segment: "Ghostly Lift"	
2003	Aanch	Mahadev	Hindi		
2004	Ab Tak Chhappan	Inspector Sadhu Agashe	Hindi		
2005	Apaharan	Tabrez Alam	Hindi		
2005	Pak Pak Pakaak	Bhutya	Marathi		
2005	Bluffmaster!	Chandru Parekh	Hindi		
2006	Phir Hera Pheri	—N/a	Hindi	Narrator	
2006	Taxi No. 9211	Raghav Shastri	Hindi		
2007	Hattrick	Doctor	Hindi		
2007	Dus Kahaniyaan	Man carrying balloons	Hindi	Segment: "Gubbare"	
2007	Welcome	Don Uday Shetty	Hindi		
2007	Yatra	Dasrath Joglekar	Hindi		
2007	The Pool	Bungalow Owner	Hindi		
2008	Ek: The Power of One	CBI Officer Rane	Hindi		
2008	Bommalattam	Rana	Tamil		
2010	Paathshaala	Principal Aditya Sahay	Hindi		
2010	Raajneeti	Brij Gopal	Hindi		
2010	Tum Milo Toh Sahi	Subramanium	Hindi		
2010	Yaksha	Police Officer	Kannada		
2011	Shagird	Hanumant Singh	Hindi		
2011	Deool	Bhau Galande	Marathi		
2012	Kamaal Dhamaal Malamaal	Kallu	Hindi		
2013	The Attacks of 26/11	Rakesh Maria	Hindi		
2014	Dr. Prakash Baba Amte: The Real Hero	Dr. Prakash Amte	Marathi		
2014	Yashwantrao Chavan– Bakhar Eka Vaadalaachi	Pratap Deshmukh	Marathi		
2015	Ab Tak Chhappan 2	Inspector Sadhu Agashe	Hindi		
2015	Welcome Back	Uday Shetty	Hindi		
2016	The Jungle Book	Shere Khan	English	Hindi dub	
2016	Natsamrat	Ganpatrao Ramchandra Belwalkar	Marathi	Also producer	
2016	Final Cut of Director	Rana	Hindi	partially reshot in Tamil as Bommalattam (2008)	
2017	Wedding Anniversary	Nagarjun	Hindi		
2017	Golmaal Again	Himself	Hindi	Cameo	
2018	Aapla Manus	Maruti Nagargoje/ Abba Gokhale	Marathi	Also producer	
2018	Kaala	Haridev Abhayankar	Tamil		
2020	It's My Life	Businessman	Hindi		
2022	Tadka	Tukaram Dalvi	Hindi		
2023	Gadar 2	—N/a	Hindi	Narrator	
2023	The Vaccine War	Dr. Balram Bhargava	Hindi		
2024	Ole Aale	Omkar Lele	Marathi		
2024	Vanvaas	Pratap Singhania, (Veer's Uncle)	Hindi		
2025	Housefull 5	Dhagdu Hulgund	Hindi		
2026	O'Romeo	Ismail Khan	Hindi		
2026	Subedaar	Nana Waghmare	Hindi	Special appearance	
2026	Eetha		Hindi	Posthumous release	
2027	Shakti Shalini	Tantric	Hindi	Posthumous release	

== Television ==
Year	Title	Role	Language	Notes	Ref.
1981	Apradhi Kaun	Unknown	Hindi		
1984	Shodh	Inspector	Hindi		
1986	Lord Mountbatten: The Last Viceroy	Nathuram Godse	English	British series	
1986	Man Vadhay Vadhay	Unknown	Marathi		
2018	Naamatra	Himself	Marathi	Documentary	
2026	Sankalp	Kanhaiya Lal	Hindi		
