= Raj Kapoor Special Contribution Award =

Maharashtra's highest contribution award

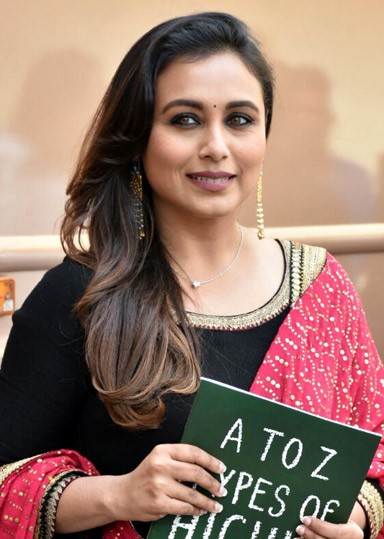
- Awarded for: Special Contribution in Indian cinema
- Location: Maharashtra
- Country: India
- Presented by: Government of Maharashtra
- First award: 2008
- Recent winner: Rani Mukerji

Highlights
- First winner: Aamir Khan

The Raj Kapoor Special Contribution Award is the highest contribution award in Hindi cinema, established by the Government of Maharashtra, India. It is presented annually by the Department of Cultural Affairs, Maharashtra in Maharashtra State Film Awards. Award instituted in 2008 to recognises individual for their "Special Contribution to Hindi cinema". The recipient is recognized for their exceptional contribution to the Indian cinema and is chosen by a panel of distinguished figures within the Indian film sector. The accolade includes a certificate, a shawl, and a monetary award of ₹3,00,000.

The Government of Maharashtra created the award to commemorate the contribution of Indian actor & filmmaker Raj Kapoor. Kapoor (1924–1988), who is popularly known as greatest and most influential actor and filmmaker of Indian cinema.

The first recipient of the award was filmmaker Aamir Khan, who was honoured at the Maharashtra State Film Awards in 2008. As of 2025, there have been 17 awardees.

== Recipients ==
List of award recipients
| Year | Image | Recipient | Field of Work | Notes | Ref. |
|---|---|---|---|---|---|
| 2008 | | Aamir Khan | Actor | Credited with redefining Hindi cinema through content-driven films that combined commercial success with socially relevant themes, including Lagaan, Taare Zameen Par and 3 Idiots. | |
| 2009 | | Ashutosh Gowariker | Director | Recognised for bringing epic scale and historical storytelling to Hindi cinema through Lagaan, Swades, and Jodhaa Akbar. | |
| 2010 | | Shabana Azmi | Actress | A leading figure of India’s parallel cinema, acclaimed for powerful performances in Ankur, Arth, Mandi, Masoom and Fire. | |
| 2011 | | Madhuri Dixit | Actress | A defining star of Hindi cinema’s 1980s and 1990s era, acclaimed for her acting and dance performances in Tezaab, Beta, Dil, Hum Aapke Hain Koun..!, Dil To Pagal Hai and Devdas. | |
| 2012 | | Nana Patekar | Actor | Known for bringing raw intensity and realism to Hindi cinema through powerful performances in Parinda, Krantiveer, & Yeshwant, etc. | |
| 2013 | | Madhur Bhandarkar | Director, writer | Noted for bringing socially provocative subjects into mainstream Hindi cinema such as Chandni Bar, Page 3 & Fashion, etc. | |
| 2014 | | Vidya Balan | Actress | Instrumental in expanding the scope of female-led Hindi cinema through acclaimed performances in The Dirty Picture, Kahaani, Tumhari Sulu, Shakuntala Devi and Sherni. | |
| 2015 | | Anil Kapoor | Actor | A versatile force in Hindi cinema, whose enduring stardom and acclaimed performances across genres include Mr. India, Tezaab, Ram Lakhan, Taal and Nayak. | |
| 2016 | | Jackie Shroff | Actor | A distinctive presence in Hindi cinema, recognised for his versatility across action, drama and character roles in Ram Lakhan, Parinda, Rangeela & Devdas. | |
| 2017 | | Rajkumar Hirani | Director | Credited with blending humour, emotion and social commentary in commercially successful Hindi films such as Munna Bhai M.B.B.S., Lage Raho Munna Bhai, 3 Idiots & PK. | |
| 2018 | | Paresh Rawal | Actor | Distinguished by his remarkable range across comedy, drama and negative roles, such as in Hera Pheri, OMG – Oh My God!, Sir & Tamanna. | |
| 2019 | | J. P. Dutta | Director | Known for establishing war dramas as a prominent genre in Hindi cinema through films such as Border, LOC: Kargil, Ghulami and Paltan. | |
| 2020 | | Sonu Nigam | Singer | Widely regarded in shaping the sound of contemporary Hindi film music through his versatile playback singing. | |
| 2021 | | Vidhu Vinod Chopra | Director, producer | Known for combining unconventional storytelling with acclaimed productions such as 1942: A Love Story, Parinda, Munna Bhai M.B.B.S., 3 Idiots and PK. | |
| 2022 | | N. Chandra | Director, producer, writer | Credited with bringing gritty, socially charged storytelling to mainstream Hindi cinema through films such as Ankush, Pratighaat, Tezaab, and Yeh Hai Mumbai Meri Jaan. | |
| 2023 | | Kajol | Actress | A defining leading lady of Hindi cinema, celebrated for her emotionally powerful performances in Baazigar, Dilwale Dulhania Le Jayenge, Kuch Kuch Hota Hai, Fanaa and My Name Is Khan. | |
| 2024 | | Rani Mukerji | Actress | Admired for expanding the range of female characters in mainstream Hindi cinema through performances in Hum Tum, Black, Hichki, Mardaani and Mrs. Chatterjee vs Norway. | |

== See also ==
- Dadasaheb Phalke Award
- Raj Kapoor Award
- V. Shantaram Lifetime Achievement Award
- V. Shantaram Special Contribution Award
