= List of Marathi films of 1986 =

A list of films produced by the Marathi language film industry based in Maharashtra in the year 1986.

== 1986 Releases ==
A list of Marathi films released in 1986.

Year	Film	Director	Cast	Release Date	Producer	Notes	Source
1986	Pudhcha Paool	Rajdutt	Ashalata, yashvant Dutt, Nilu Phule, Prashant Damle		Madhukar Rupji, Sudha A. Chitle, Vinay Newalkar	National Film Award for Best Feature Film in Marathi in 1985	
1986	Dhakti Soon	N. S. Vaidya	Savita Prabhune, Vasant Shinde, Laxmikant Berde, Leela Gandhi, Sharad talvalkar	22 May 1986	Amar Tulsani; Sharad Vartak		
1986	Dhondi Dhondi Paani De	Arun Vasudev Karnatki					
1986	Aai Tulzabhavani	Arun Vasudev Karnatki					
1986	Tu Saubhagyavati Ho	Murlidhar Kapdi	Smita Talvalkar				
1986	Gadbad Ghotala	Raja Bargir	Laxmikant Berde, Shekhar Navre, Savita Prabhani, Ashok Saraf, Smita Talwalkar, Manorama Wagle, Savita Prabhune				
1986	Mazhe Ghar Mazha Sansar	Rajdutt	Ajinkya Dev, Reema, Mugdha Chitnis, Shekar Tamhane, Yashwant Dutt			Based on Marathi novel 'Joul' by Ratnakar Matkari	
1986	Amhi Doghe Raja Rani	Kamalakar Torne	Vicky Bendre, Laxmikant Berde, Atmaram Bhende		Everest Entertainment		
1986	Maaficha Sakshidar	Rajdutt	Nana Patekar, Bindu, Mohan Gokhale, Avinash Kharshikar		Hem Hira Chitra	Based on true events of Joshi-Abhyankar serial murders which took place in Pune in mid 70s	
1986	Bijli	Anant Marathe	Master Bhagwan, Laxmi Chhaya, Dhumal		Vidya Films		
1986	Aaj Jhale Mukt Mi	Rajdutt	Bharati Achrekar, Snehlata Bhayande, Juhilee Dehuskar		Yashodeep Chitre		
