= Mohre =

- Poster
- Directed by: Raghuveer Kul
- Produced by: Appa Dandekar
- Starring: Nana Patekar; Madhuri Dixit; Sadashiv Amrapurkar; Anupam Kher; Aloknath
- Cinematography: Ishan Arya
- Edited by: Das Dhaimade
- Music by: Vanraj Bhatia
- Release date: 28 October 1988
- Country: India
- Language: Hindi

Mohre (transl. Pawns) is a 1988 Indian Hindi movie directed by Raghuveer Kul. It starred Nana Patekar and Madhuri Dixit in lead roles. The pair later worked together in Vidhu Vinod Chopra's Parinda, his own directorial debut, Prahaar, and the N. Chandra-directed Wajood. This film also starred Sadashiv Amrapurkar, Anupam Kher among others.

== Plot ==
Abdul is a truck driver plagued with severe alcoholism and depression that causes him to want to end his life. One day, another truck driver shows him a newspaper advertisement that offers help for suicide-ridden youth. Abdul decides to try them out and travels all the way to the countryside. Once there, he is joined by four other youths, including a printing press proof-reader, Prakash Raikar; a young woman, Maya, who had been molested and hates men, as well as two other males, including Sunil, who is gay. They meet with the person who placed the advertisement, a wheelchair-using former Indian Army Major, Vishwas Sawant, and his assistant, Vasu Mudaliar. The two are escaped convicts by the names of Jagga and Badri, who seek their patients' deaths.

== Cast ==
- Nana Patekar as Abdul
- Madhuri Dixit as Maya
- Sadashiv Amrapurkar as Badrinath Chawla "Badri" / Vasu Mudaliar
- Anupam Kher as Jagmohan Sharma "Jagga" / Major Vishwas Sawant
- Aloknath as Father Braganza
- Nilu Phule as Social Worker
- Shreechand Makhija as Mr. Makhija
- K. K. Raina as Prakash Raikar
- Jayshree T. as Courtesan

== Soundtrack ==
Song	Singer
"Shatranj Hai Yeh Duniya"	Manna Dey
"Ek Lamha To Bina Dard"	Kishore Kumar
"Dil Ki Raftaar Se, Lehrake Pyar Se Yaaron Ki Gaadi Chali"	Mahendra Kapoor, Shailendra Singh, Preeti Sagar
"Pehli Pehli Baar Jab"	Asha Bhosle
"Kali Hain Teri Zulfen"	Asha Bhosle
