= 38th Filmfare Awards =

1993 awards for Hindi cinema

- Date: 1993

Highlights
- Best Film: Jo Jeeta Wohi Sikandar
- Critics Award for Best Film: Idiot
- Most awards: Beta and Deewana (5)
- Most nominations: Beta, Deewana and Khuda Gawah (9)

The 38th Filmfare Awards were awards held in 1993 to honour Hindi-language films.

Beta, Deewana and Khuda Gawah led the ceremony with 9 nominations each, followed by Jo Jeeta Wohi Sikandar with 8 nominations.

Jo Jeeta Wohi Sikandar won Best Film without winning any other major awards, while Beta and Deewana won 5 awards each, with the former winning Best Actor (for Anil Kapoor), Best Actress (for Madhuri Dixit) and Best Supporting Actress (for Aruna Irani), and the latter winning Best Male Debut (for Shah Rukh Khan) and Best Female Debut (for Divya Bharti). thus become the most-awarded films at the ceremony.

== Main awards ==
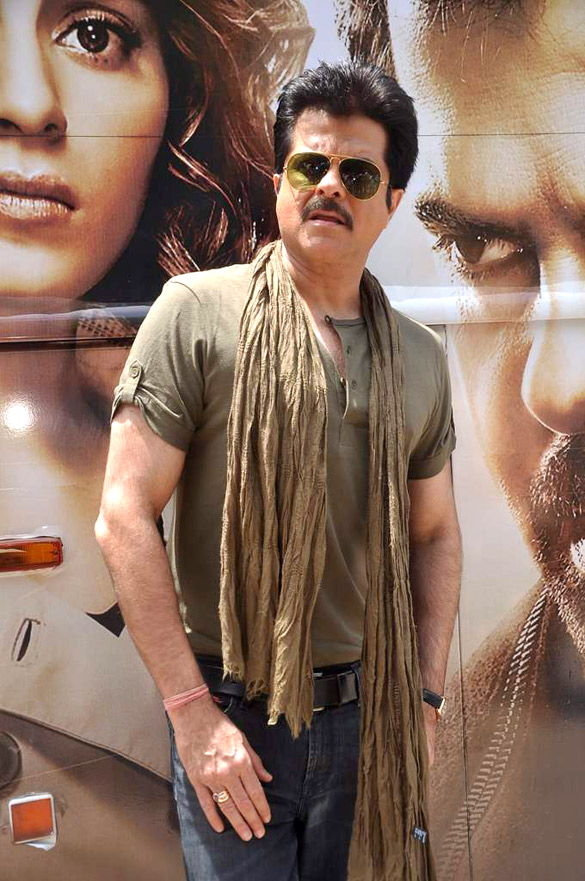
Anil Kapoor — Best Actor winner for Beta

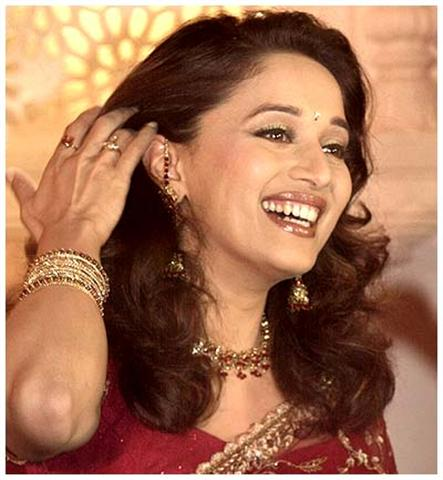
Madhuri Dixit — Best Actress winner for Beta

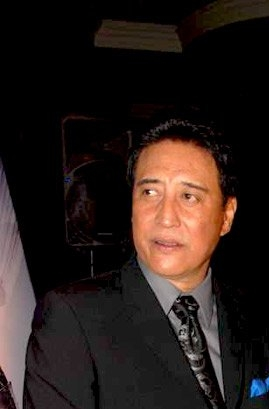
Danny Denzongpa — Best Supporting Actor winner for Khuda Gawah

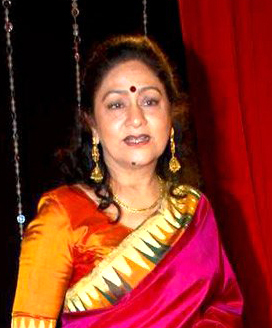
Aruna Irani — Best Supporting Actress winner for Beta

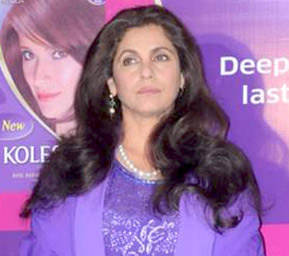
Dimple Kapadia — Best Actress Critics winner for Rudaali

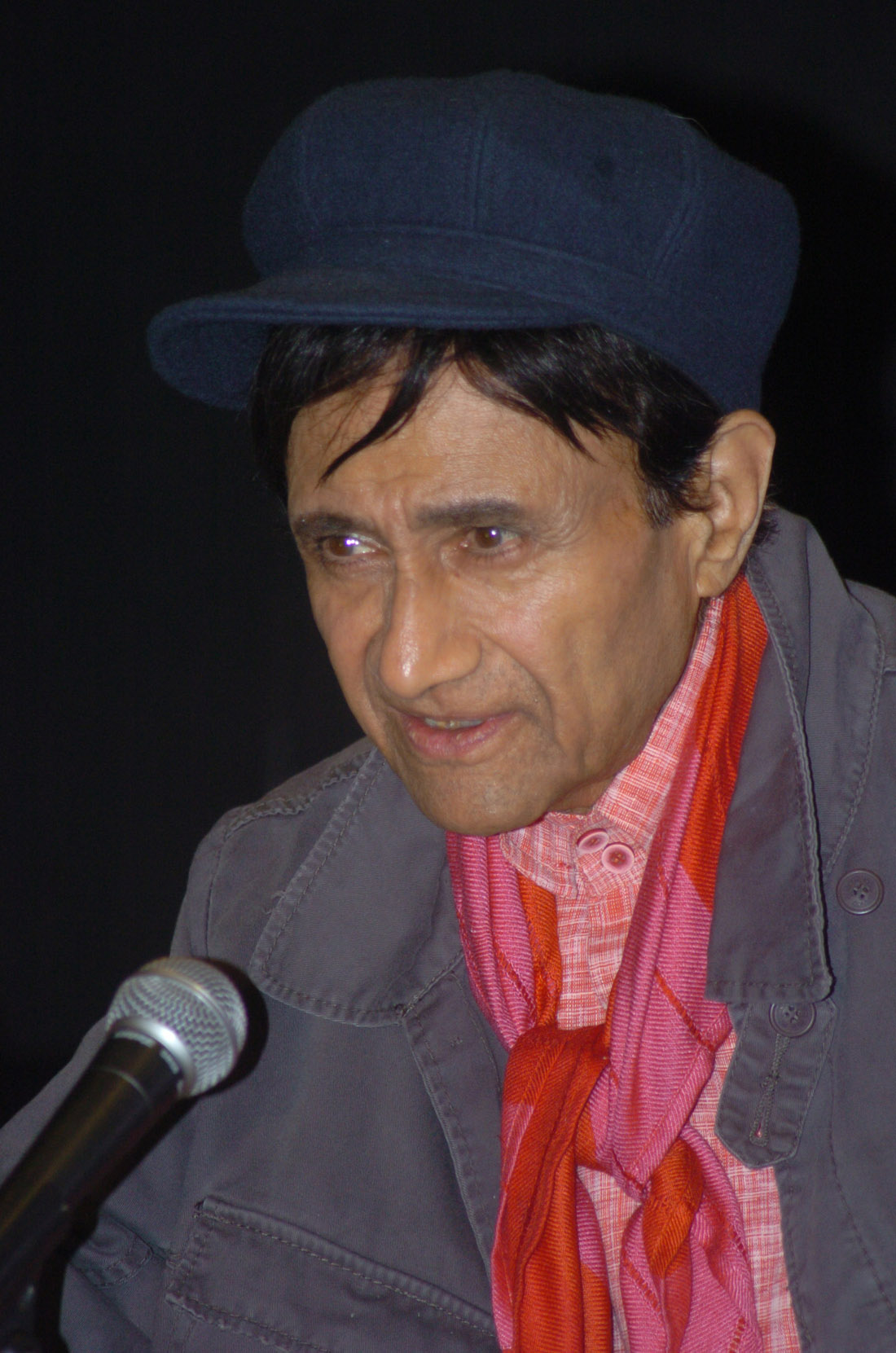
Dev Anand — Lifetime Achievement Awardee

=== Main awards ===
Best Film	Best Director
Jo Jeeta Wohi Sikandar; Beta; Khuda Gawah	Mukul Anand – Khuda Gawah; Indra Kumar – Beta; Mansoor Khan – Jo Jeeta Wohi Sikandar
Best Actor	Best Actress
Anil Kapoor – Beta; Aamir Khan – Jo Jeeta Wohi Sikandar; Amitabh Bachchan – Khuda Gawah	Madhuri Dixit – Beta; Juhi Chawla – Bol Radha Bol; Sridevi – Khuda Gawah
Best Supporting Actor	Best Supporting Actress
Danny Denzongpa – Khuda Gawah; Amrish Puri – Muskurahat; Nana Patekar – Raju Ban Gaya Gentleman	Aruna Irani – Beta; Pooja Bedi – Jo Jeeta Wohi Sikandar; Shilpa Shirodkar – Khuda Gawah
Best Comedian	Best Villain
Anupam Kher – Khel; Anupam Kher – Shola Aur Shabnam; Laxmikant Berde – Beta	Nana Patekar – Angaar; Amrish Puri – Tahalka; Kiran Kumar – Khuda Gawah
Best Male Debut	Best Female Debut
Shah Rukh Khan – Deewana	Divya Bharti – Deewana

=== Best Screenplay ===
Raju Ban Gaya Gentleman – Aziz Mirza and Manoj Lalwani

=== Best Dialogue ===
Angaar – Kader Khan

=== Best Music Director ===
Deewana – Nadeem-Shravan

- Beta – Anand–Milind
- Jo Jeeta Wohi Sikandar – Jatin–Lalit

=== Best Lyricist ===
Deewana – Sameer for Teri Umeed

- Deewana – Sameer for Aisi Deewangi
- Jo Jeeta Wohi Sikandar – Majrooh Sultanpuri for Woh Sikandar Hi Doston

=== Best Playback Singer, Male ===
Deewana – Kumar Sanu for Sochenge Tumhein

- Deewana – Vinod Rathod for Aisi Deewangi
- Jo Jeeta Wohi Sikandar – Udit Narayan for Pehla Nasha

=== Best Playback Singer, Female ===
Beta – Anuradha Paudwal for Dhak Dhak

- Deewana – Alka Yagnik for Aisi Deewangi
- Khuda Gawah – Kavita Krishnamurthy for Main Tujhe Kabool

=== Best Action ===
Khuda Gawah

=== Best Art Direction ===
Angaar

=== Best Choreography ===
Beta – Saroj Khan for Dhak Dhak Karne Laga

=== Best Cinematography ===
Muskurahat

=== Best Editing ===
Jo Jeeta Wohi Sikandar

=== Best Sound ===
Khuda Gawah

=== Lifetime Achievement Award ===
Dev Anand

== Critics' awards ==
=== Best Film ===
Idiot

=== Best Actress ===
Dimple Kapadia – Rudaali

=== Best Documentary ===
All in the Family

== Biggest Winners ==
- Beta – 5/9
- Deewana – 5/9
- Khuda Gawah – 4/9
- Angaar – 3/3
- Jo Jeeta Wohi Sikandar – 2/8

== See also ==
- 39th Filmfare Awards
- 40th Filmfare Awards
- Filmfare Awards
