= Raju Ban Gaya Gentleman =

1992 Indian film by Aziz Mirza

- Theatrical release poster
- Directed by: Aziz Mirza
- Written by: Manoj Lalwani; Aziz Mirza
- Dialogues by: Charandas Shokh
- Produced by: G. P. Sippy; Vivek Vaswani
- Starring: Shah Rukh Khan; Amrita Singh; Juhi Chawla; Nana Patekar
- Cinematography: Binod Pradhan
- Edited by: Javed Sayyed
- Music by: Jatin–Lalit
- Production company: Sippy Films
- Release date: 13 November 1992
- Running time: 152 minutes
- Country: India
- Language: Hindi
- Budget: ₹60 lakhs
- Box office: ₹3.44 crore (India)

Raju Ban Gaya Gentleman (transl. Raju became a Gentleman) is a 1992 Indian Hindi-language romantic comedy-drama film directed by Aziz Mirza (in his directorial debut). The film stars Shah Rukh Khan, Amrita Singh, Juhi Chawla and Nana Patekar. Raju, a young Diploma Holder in Civil Engineering from Darjeeling who comes to Bombay hoping to become a successful engineer. The plot of the film is loosely inspired by The Secret of My Success (1997), Shree 420 (1955) and Anari (1959).

At the 38th Filmfare Awards, Raju Ban Gaya Gentleman won Best Screenplay (Mirza and Lalwani), in addition to a Best Supporting Actor nomination for Patekar.

== Plot ==
Raj Mathur (Shah Rukh Khan), also known as Raju, is an ambitious young man from Darjeeling who moves to Bombay hoping to become a successful civil engineer. Upon arriving, he discovers that the acquaintance he intended to stay with has moved away, leaving him homeless and unemployed. He meets Jai (Nana Patekar), a street performer who offers him shelter and introduces him to the residents of Azad Nagar. Among them is Renu Singh (Juhi Chawla), an independent young woman with whom Raju initially has several disagreements. Despite his unsuccessful attempts to find engineering work, Raju refuses to accept menial employment until Renu persuades him to take a temporary job at a library. As they spend more time together, their friendship develops into romance.

Renu subsequently arranges an interview for Raju at Chhabria Constructions, where she works. Although the interviewers initially question his qualifications, Raju impresses them by identifying unnecessary expenditures in a previous construction project and proposing more economical alternatives. He is hired as an assistant engineer and celebrates his success with Renu, Jai, and his neighborhood friends. His confidence and technical abilities soon attract the attention of company chairman Lalkishan Chhabria (Navin Nischol) and his daughter Sapna (Amrita Singh). During a meeting concerning a proposed residential development, Raju questions the inclusion of expensive recreational facilities, arguing that schools, hospitals, and other essential amenities would better serve middle-income families. Impressed by his suggestions, the management promotes him, while Sapna begins developing romantic feelings for him.

Raju's rising influence creates resentment among senior employees Malhotra (Ajit Vachani) and his son Deepak (Sameer Chitre), who regard him as a threat to their positions. Meanwhile, Raju's professional commitments begin interfering with his relationship with Renu. After Sapna unexpectedly takes him to Delhi for an important business meeting, he helps secure a construction contract by identifying technical issues overlooked by competing contractors. His achievement earns him further recognition, while his growing closeness to Sapna causes Renu considerable discomfort.

Despite his success, Raju initially remains connected to Azad Nagar and arranges construction jobs for several unemployed residents, including Pandey and Chandu. However, his increasing wealth and prestige gradually change his behavior. He begins attending lavish parties, wearing expensive clothes, and enjoying the privileges of his position. Jai warns him against forgetting his humble beginnings, while Renu worries that his ambitions are becoming more important than their relationship. Sapna further strengthens her influence by providing Raju with a luxurious residence and arranging his promotion to chief engineer of a major bridge project.

As Raju becomes more involved in the company's operations, he discovers that Malhotra has been purchasing substandard construction materials. He also learns that Chhabria expects him to bribe officials to secure approvals for the bridge project. Although initially reluctant, Raju begins accepting the company's dishonest practices to protect his position. Renu confronts him over his changing values and warns him that his pursuit of wealth will eventually destroy his integrity. She also visits Sapna, asking her to stop interfering in their relationship, but Sapna insists that Raju deserves a more prosperous lifestyle. Disillusioned, Renu resigns from the company and gives Raju an ultimatum to abandon his dishonest activities. When he refuses, she ends their relationship.

Following their separation, Sapna attempts to console Raju and accompanies him to purchase an expensive car, fulfilling one of his longstanding ambitions. Meanwhile, Malhotra and Deepak conspire to undermine Raju by deliberately sabotaging the bridge construction. Their actions cause the structure to collapse, killing four workers, including Pandey and Chandu. Malhotra immediately blames Raju, who, as the project's chief engineer, is held responsible for the disaster. Fearing damage to his company's reputation, Chhabria instructs Raju to support a fabricated explanation that terrorists caused the collapse. At a press conference, Raju reluctantly confirms the company's account, despite knowing that the allegations are unsubstantiated.

His statements outrage the residents of Azad Nagar. Jai confronts Raju and takes him to meet the grieving families of the deceased workers, condemning him for betraying the people who supported him when he first arrived in Bombay. Overcome with guilt, Raju recognizes how far he has strayed from his principles. He attempts to reconcile with Renu, but she remains deeply hurt by his actions.

Raju eventually overhears Malhotra and Deepak discussing their involvement in the bridge collapse. Furious, he confronts Malhotra and forces him to provide a written confession. Raju presents the confession to Chhabria, expecting him to take action against those responsible. Instead, Chhabria destroys the evidence, insisting that protecting the company is more important than exposing the scandal. Disgusted, Raju announces his intention to testify in court, regardless of the consequences to his career.

Sapna attempts to persuade Raju to reconsider, warning that her father will never approve of their relationship if he proceeds. Raju finally admits that he has always loved Renu and never intended to pursue a romantic relationship with Sapna. Realizing that his ambition has cost him the people he values most, he returns the expensive gifts Sapna provided and leaves the company.

On his way to court, Raju is attacked by men hired to prevent his testimony, but Jai intervenes and helps him escape. Raju arrives at the hearing and publicly accuses Malhotra and Deepak of deliberately causing the bridge collapse. He also acknowledges his own involvement in the company's dishonest practices. However, Chhabria's employees provide fabricated testimony accusing Raju of negligence, corruption, and deliberately using inferior construction materials. The company's lawyer further alleges that Raju exploited Sapna to advance his career and assaulted her after she rejected his marriage proposal.

Unable to defend himself against the accusations, Raju appeals to Sapna to reveal the truth. After initially remaining silent, Sapna testifies that the allegations concerning their relationship are false, undermining the company's attempt to discredit him. The court subsequently orders a high-level investigation into the bridge collapse.

Following the hearing, Raju thanks Sapna for defending him, and she encourages him to reunite with Renu. However, ashamed of his mistakes and believing that he no longer deserves her love, Raju decides to leave Bombay and return to Darjeeling. As he departs, Renu and the residents of Azad Nagar gather to see him off. Jai encourages Raju to look back at Renu, believing that he will be unable to leave if he sees her. Raju eventually turns around, realizes that he cannot abandon the woman he loves, and returns to Renu. The two reconcile as their friends celebrate, with Raju having learned that honesty, loyalty, and love are more valuable than wealth and social status.

== Cast ==
- Shahrukh Khan as Raju "Raj" Mathur
- Amrita Singh as Sapna L. Chhabria, Lalkishan's daughter
- Juhi Chawla as Renu Singh
- Nana Patekar as Jai
- Navin Nischol as Lalkishan Chhabria, Sapna's father
- Ajit Vachani as Malhotra
- Anjan Srivastav as Saxena
- Sameer Chitre as Deepak Malhotra
- Lalit Tiwari as Rafique
- Vivek Vaswani as Lovechand Kukreja
- Achyut Potdar as Joshi
- Neeraj Vora as Abdul
- Amrit Patel as Gullu Dada
- Ravi Patwardhan as Prosecuting Lawyer
- Pramod Moutho

== Soundtrack ==
The soundtrack was composed by Jatin–Lalit. The film's soundtrack album sold 1.8 million units in India, making it the eleventh top-selling Bollywood music album of 1992. Most of the songs are sung by Kumar Sanu, with vocals by Alka Yagnik, Sudesh Bhonsle, Sadhana Sargam and Jolly Mukherjee.

#	Title	Singer(s)	Lyricist
1	"Kya Hua-Loveria Hua"	Kumar Sanu, Jolly Mukherjee, Alka Yagnik	Vinod Mahendra
2	"Dil Hai Mera Deewana"	Kumar Sanu	Dev Kohli
3	"Kehti Hai Dil Ki Lagi"	Kumar Sanu, Alka Yagnik	Vinod Mahendra
4	"Seene Mein Dil Hai"	Kumar Sanu, Alka Yagnik	Madan Pal
5	"Tu Mere Saath Saath"	Kumar Sanu, Alka Yagnik	Mahendra Dehlvi
6	"Raju Ban Gaya Gentleman"	Kumar Sanu, Jolly Mukherjee, Sudesh Bhonsle, Sadhana Sargam	Dev Kohli
7	"Tham Tham Tham"	Kumar Sanu, Alka Yagnik	Manoj Darpan
8	"Raju Ban Gaya Gentleman" (Sad)	Sadhana Sargam	Dev Kohli

== Production ==
G. P. Sippy initially preferred a more established actor for the male lead, as Shah Rukh Khan was a newcomer at the time. Aamir Khan and Vivek Mushran were among the actors considered for the role, however, co-producer Vivek Vaswani eventually persuaded Sippy to cast Khan, although Sippy capped the film's budget at only ₹60 lakhs. Vaswani subsequently persuaded Juhi Chawla, an established actress, to play the female lead by describing Khan as the "next Aamir Khan".

Khan married Gauri Khan during the making of the film. Struggling financially, he borrowed suits from the film's costume department for the wedding. Aziz Mirza and Vaswani attended the ceremony.

== Box office ==
In India, the film grossed ₹3.44 crore.

Raju Ban Gaya Gentleman was released in Japan on 17 May 1997. While Indian parallel cinema, including Satyajit Ray's Bengali films such as The Apu Trilogy, was known in Japan, Raju Ban Gaya Gentleman introduced the commercial masala film style, which was well received by Japanese audiences, with the film becoming a commercial success in the country. This sparked a short-lived boom in Indian films released in Japan, for the next two years, paving the way for the Japanese success of Rajinikanth's Muthu (1995) in 1998.

== Awards and nominations ==
=== 38th Filmfare Awards ===
Won

- Best Screenplay – Aziz Mirza and Manoj Lalwani

Nominated

- Best Supporting Actor – Nana Patekar
