= Reti (film) =

- Directed by: Suhas Bhosale
- Written by: Deven Kapadnis
- Produced by: Pramod Gore
- Starring: Chinmay Mandlekar; Kishor Kadam; Shashank Shende; Sanjay Khapare; Vidhyadhar Joshi; Gayatri Soham; Suhas Palshikar; Deepak Karanjikar; Mosami Tondwalkar; Bhagyashri Rane
- Music by: Shaan; Roshan Balu; Gaurav Deshgupta
- Production company: Atharva Movies
- Release date: 8 April 2016
- Country: India
- Language: Marathi

Reti is a 2016 Marathi-language film directed by Suhas Bhosale. It was the Marathi debut of Bollywood singer Shaan as a music director.

== Plot ==
The movie is based on the Sand mafia and is about government officials who prevent the uncontrollable theft of sand, which no government has been able to stop.

== Cast ==
- Chinmay Mandlekar as Shankarya
- Suhas Palshikar as Revenue Minister
- Kishor Kadam as Kisan
- Shashank Shende as Mhatre
- Swapnil Rajshekhar as Divisional Officer
- Gayatri Soham as Suli

== Soundtrack ==
Reeti

Soundtrack album by Shaan, Roshan Balu, Gaurav Deshgupta
- Released: February 2016

The film remarks the Marathi debut of Shaan as a composer. The soundtrack album contains 3 songs all songs are composed by Superbia.

No.	Title	Artist(s)	Length
1.	"Nimut Taryache"	Shaan, Nihira Joshi
2.	"Bagh Bagh"	Apeksha Dandekar
3.	"Reti" (Theme Song)	Shaan
