= Dhiruben Patel =

Indian writer (1926–2023)

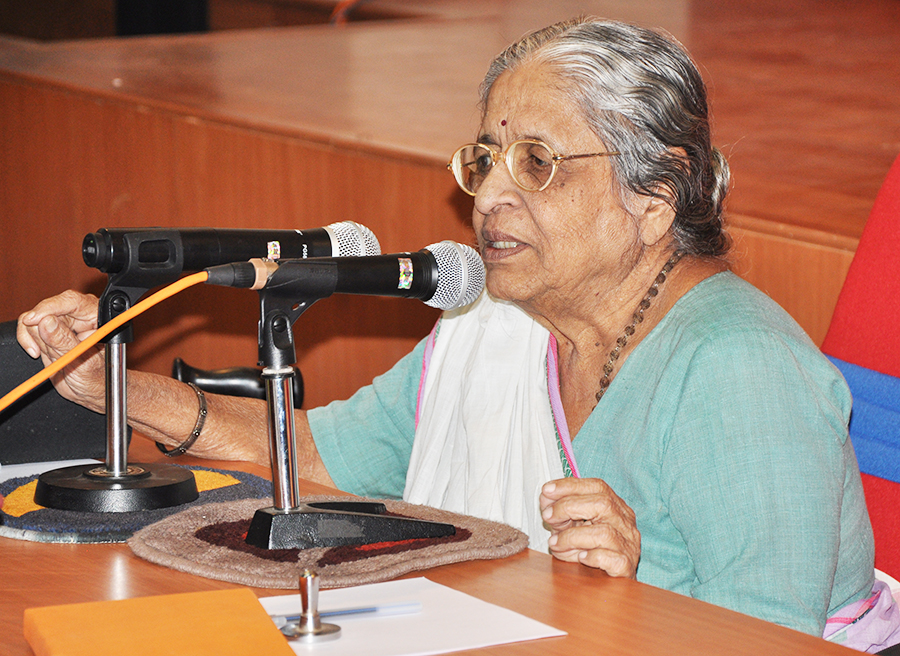
- Patel in 2013
- Born: 25 May 1926; Baroda, Baroda State, British Raj (now Vadodara)
- Died: 10 March 2023 (aged 96); Ahmedabad, Gujarat, India
- Citizenship: Indian
- Occupations: Novelist; Play writer; Film writer; Translator
- Writing career
- Language: Gujarati
- Notable works: Agantuk, Nirbandh Nibandho
- Notable awards: Ranjitram Suvarna Chandrak; Sahitya Akademi Award for Gujarati

Dhiruben Gordhanbhai Patel (25 May 1926 – 10 March 2023) was an Indian novelist, playwright, and translator.

== Life ==
Dhiruben Gordhanbhai Patel was born on 29 May 1926 in Baroda (now Vadodara, Gujarat) to Gordhanbhai Patel, a journalist with the Bombay Chronicle, and Gangaben Patel, a political activist and member of the All India Congress Committee. Her family belongs to Dharmaj village near Anand. She grew up and lived in Santacruz, a suburb of Mumbai. She was educated at the Poddar school in Mumbai. She completed higher education from Elphinstone College. She completed a B.A. in English in 1945 and an M.A. in 1949 from Bhavan's College. She taught English in college at Dahisar in 1963-64 and later taught English literature at the Bharatiya Vidya Bhavan.

Patel briefly worked with Anand Publishers. Subsequently, she founded Kalki Prakashan, a publishing house in 1963-64. From 1966 to 1975, she edited Sudha, a Gujarati journal. She later served as the President of the Gujarat Sahitya Sabha. She served as the President of the Gujarati Sahitya Parishad in 2003―2004, and one of her plays, Bhavni Bhavai, has been adapted into a film.

Patel died on 10 March 2023, at the age of 96.

== Works ==
Dhiruben Patel has written several collections of short stories and poetry as well as novels, radio plays, and stage plays. Her work was influenced by Gandhian ideals. Critics Susie Tharu and Ke Lalita have written, "Although Dhiruben does not consider herself a feminist, like the novelist Kundanika Kapadia, she believes that the root cause of women's inferior status lies in their own mental conditioning." Her early work in particular deals with the lives of women and their relationships, and what Tharu and Lalita have also described as the "quest for selfhood". Her later work has been primarily for children and young adults, and she advocated literature for children despite the easy availability of information on the internet.

Dhiruben Patel initially wrote in Gujarati. In 2011, her novel Agantuk was translated by Raj Supe into English as Rainbow at Noon. In an interview, Patel said she agreed to let Supe translate it because "... he would understand my hero and his struggles as he has travelled the same path." A recent collection of poetry, Kitchen Poems was written in English, and was first recited by her at the Neemrana Literary Festival in 2002. These were later published and then translated into German by Peter D O'Neil, and into Marathi by Usha Mehta. She then translated the same poems into Gujarati as Kitchen Poems (2016).

Her novels and novellas include:

- Vadavanal (1963)
- Vasno Ankur (1967)
- Vavantol (1970)
- Shimla Na Phool (1976)
- Ek Bhalo Manas (1979)
- Vamal (1980)
- Andhali Gali (1983)
- Gaganna Lagan (1984)
- Kadambarini Maa (1988)
- Ek Phool Gulabi Vat (1990)
- Ek Dal Mithi (1992)
- Hutashan (1993)
- Agantuk (1996).
- Sanshaybij (1998)
- Paying Guest (1998)
- Atitrag (2000)
- Andhali Gali (1983) is a psychological novel that gives insight into the life of a woman, named Kundan, who decides to marry at the age of forty-five.

Her short story collections are

- Adhuro Call (1955)
- Ek Lahar (1957)
- Vishrambhakatha (1966)
- Tadh (1976)
- Javal (2001).
- Dhiruben ni Tunki Vartao (2019)

Kitchen Poems (2011) is a collection of poems in English, translated by her into Gujarati in 2016

Her plays include Pahelun Inam (1955), Pankhino Malo (1956), Vinashna Panthe (1961), Manno Manelo (1959), and Akash Manch (2005). Namani Nagarvel (1961) and Mayapurush (1995) are collections of one-act plays and radio plays respectively.

Patel also wrote humour, including Pardukhbhanjak Pestonjee (1978), which is a collection of humorous adventure stories of character Pestonjee, Gaganna Lagan (1984), Kartik Ane Bija Badha (1988), a collection of her humorous essays, and Kartik Rang Katha (1990).

Patel contributed to children's literature. She wrote a collection of children's stories, Kishor Varta Sangrah (2002), and poetry for young children, Mitra Na Jodakna (1973). Anderi Ganderi Tipari Ten is her one of her famous and celebrated children's plays. She translated Mark Twain's novels The Adventures of Tom Sawyer in two parts (1960, 1966) and Adventures of Huckleberry Finn in 1967.

Dhiruben na Nirbandh Nibandho is a collection of essays, while Choras Tipu is a collection of stories for children including:

- Gaada ne paida jevda rotla ni vaat
- Kaku Maku ane puchhadi ni Panchat
- Kinu Kaankhajuro
- Minu ni Mojadi
- Doctor ni fee
- Budbudsalak ane Trimtramdhadak

== Awards ==
Patel received the Ranjitram Suvarna Chandrak award in 1980. She received the K. M. Munshi Suvarna Chandrak award in 1981 and the Sahitya Gaurav Puraskar award in 2002, both by Gujarat Sahitya Akademi. She received the Nandshankar Suvarna Chandrak award and the Darshak Award in 1996. She won the 2001 Sahitya Akademi Award for Gujarati language for her novel Agantuk.

== See also ==
- List of Gujarati-language writers

Awards
Preceded by Vinesh Antani	Recipient of the Sahitya Akademi Award winners for Gujarati; 2001	Succeeded by Dhruv Bhatt
