= Suhas Palshikar (actor) =

Indian actor

Suhas Palshikar is a Hindi and Marathi film and television actor from India.

== Career ==
Palshikar made his debut in a small role in the Richard Attenborough's Oscar-winning film Gandhi in 1982. He had received IIFA Award nomination for Best Performance in a Negative Role in the movie Chandni Bar in 2001. Among his memorable roles is that of Laliya in the movie Ankush.

== Filmography ==
=== Television ===
- 1997 Byomkesh Bakshi as Naresh Mandal in the episode Dhokadhari
- 2017 Rudram (TV series)
- 2019 Agnihotra 2 (TV series)

=== Films ===
- 2021 Basta (2021 film)
- 2018 Bhavesh Joshi Superhero – Barve
- 2018 Ani... Dr. Kashinath Ghanekar - Master Dattaram
- 2017 Sarkar 3 – CM Mohan Naik
- 2016 Barad – Shyamrao Patil (anna)
- 2016 Reti – Revenue minister
- 2015 Rangaa Patangaa
- 2015 Aabhraan – Gulabrao
- 2015 Bioscope
- 2014 Dhyaas – Circus owner
- 2013 Kuni Ghar Deta Ka Ghar
- 2013 Touring Talkies – Bapu Sheth
- 2013 Tuhya Dharma Koncha? – Gurudev
- 2012 Aik
- 2009 Hello! Gandhe Sir
- 2007 Dohaa – Vishnu
- 2006 Manthan: Ek Amrut Pyala
- 2001 Chandni Bar – Irfan Mamu (as Suhas Palsikar)
- 2001 Ashi hi Gyaneshwari
- 1995 Nirantharam
- 1992 Karm Yodha – Mahesh Desai's Henchmen
- 1987 Pratighaat
- 1986 Ankush – Laliya
- 1982 Gandhi – Hindu Youth in Calcutta Street
