= Tezaab =

1988 Indian film by N. Chandra

- Film poster
- Directed by: N. Chandra
- Written by: N. Chandra; Kamlesh Pandey (dialogues)
- Produced by: N. Chandra
- Starring: Anil Kapoor; Madhuri Dixit; Anupam Kher; Chunky Panday; Mandakini; Kiran Kumar; Suresh Oberoi
- Cinematography: Baba Azmi
- Music by: Laxmikant–Pyarelal
- Release date: 11 November 1988
- Running time: 173 mins
- Country: India
- Language: Hindi

Tezaab (transl. Acid) is a 1988 Indian Hindi-language romantic action drama film starring Anil Kapoor and Madhuri Dixit in lead roles. The film gave Dixit her first big break, making her an overnight star in addition to reaffirming Kapoor's superstar status, after a successful Mr. India (1987). The film was directed, produced, and co-written by N. Chandra. The music was composed by Laxmikant–Pyarelal.

Tezaab was released on 11 November 1988 and was a major commercial success at the box office, becoming the highest-grossing Indian film of the year. It ran in theatres for more than 50 weeks, becoming a golden jubilee success. With Tezaab, N. Chandra scored a box office hat-trick with his previous hits Ankush (1986) and Pratighaat (1987). The film is also popular for the song "Ek Do Teen", which was a chartbusting success. It received positive reviews from critics and viewers upon release, with praise for its story, screenplay, dialogues, soundtrack, and performances of the cast.

At the 34th Filmfare Awards, Tezaab received a leading 12 nominations, Best Film, Best Director (Chandra), Best Actress (Dixit) and Best Supporting Actor (Panday), and won 4 awards, including Best Actor (Kapoor), Best Female Playback Singer (Alka Yagnik) and Best Choreography (Saroj Khan), the latter two for the song "Ek, Do, Teen". At the ceremony, Kapoor scored his first Best Actor win, while Dixit garnered her first-ever Best Actress nomination.

== Plot ==
When Inspector Singh learns that a man named Munna is about to reach his region of jurisdiction, he checks Munna's record. Munna is identified as Cadet Mahesh Deshmukh, whom he first met at the scene of a bank robbery in Nashik a few years prior, where Mahesh's parents and numerous other bank employees had been brutally murdered by a gang of thieves.

Following the bank incident, Inspector Singh finds Munna, rekindles their connection, and inquires as to his whereabouts. Munna reveals that he and his sister Jyoti had relocated to Bombay, where they had met Mohini, a poor and miserable young woman who was compelled to dance in order to support her father, Shyamlal, a drunk man who does not want to marry Mohini off. He acted similarly against his wife, and when she disobeyed him, he attacked her with acid, resulting in her committing suicide.

In his youth, Shyamlal had taken a huge loan from Lotiya Pathan, a dreaded gangster, and the only way to repay it was to make Mohini dance. Shyamlal also has to deal with Chote Khan, the younger brother of Lotiya, who was involved in the robbery and the death of Mahesh's parents. Meanwhile, Mahesh and Mohini fall in love with each other while studying in the same college, where he joins a group of boys.

After being released on bail, Chote Khan attempts to rape Jyoti, but Mahesh kills him in self-defense. Mahesh is subsequently arrested and sentenced to one year in prison. After his release, Mahesh changes his name to Munna.

Upon learning Munna's backstory, Inspector Singh allows him to complete his mission under strict conditions. When Lotiya hears of Munna's return, he kidnaps Mohini. Shyamlal pleads with Munna to rescue her and insists that she be returned only to him. Munna successfully rescues Mohini, but although they are happy to reunite, Munna asks her to return to her father, leaving Mohini heartbroken. As promised, Munna surrenders to Inspector Singh, is tried in court, and sentenced to prison. After a retrial, Munna is acquitted and decides to start a new life in Goa. However, Jyoti convinces him not to abandon his love for Mohini. Munna sends his friends Guldasta and Baban to inform Mohini of his whereabouts. Shyamlal, overhearing Mohini's plans to escape, becomes enraged and attempts to stop her. In the ensuing conflict, Guldasta and Shyamlal are both killed, but Mohini manages to escape and reunites with Munna.

Meanwhile, Lotiya, enraged by Munna's acquittal, plans to kill him to avenge his brother's death. Munna's friend Baban learns of Lotiya's conspiracy and confronts him, leading to a fierce fight where Lotiya is defeated. In a moment of rage, Baban attempts to kill Lotiya, but Munna intervenes to prevent the murder. Lotiya regains his strength and attacks Munna with a club. Baban sacrifices himself to protect Munna. Munna then confronts Lotiya and is about to kill him when Inspector Singh arrives and stops him, urging Munna not to take the law into his own hands. However, when Lotiya attempts another attack on Munna, Inspector Singh shoots and kills him, bringing the conflict to an end.

Alternate ending

Baban does not die here; excluding this fact, the rest of the ending is exactly like the original.

== Cast ==
- Anil Kapoor as Mahesh "Munna" Deshmukh
- Madhuri Dixit as Mohini Dhanyekar
- Anupam Kher as Shyamlal Dhanyekar, Mohini's father
- Chunky Panday as Sushim "Baban" Choudhry, Munna's friend
- Aruna Irani as Chamkeeli Bai
- Suparna Anand as Jyoti Deshmukh, Munna's younger sister
- Kiran Kumar as Lotiya Pathan
- Annu Kapoor as Abbas Ali / Guldasta
- Suresh Oberoi as Inspector Gagan Singh
- Tej Sapru as Rantej Saxena
- Johnny Lever as Kainchee Singh, Munna's friend
- Mahavir Shah as Inspector Tarachand Gupta
- Salman Khan as Rookki
- Jack Gaud as Mukut Bihari
- Dinesh Hingoo as Marwadi Seth
- Achyut Potdar as Namrish Deshmukh, Munna's father
- Vijay Patkar as Chiraunji Surwadhre, Munna's friend
- Jaywant Wadkar as Aman Pratap Ahuja, Munna's friend
- Mandakini as Nikita Sharma (Special appearance)
- Suhasini Joshi as Sumira Dhanyekar, Mohini's mother (Cameo appearance)
- Ravi Patwardhan as Lawyer, Public Prosecutor

== Soundtrack ==
The film's music is composed by Laxmikant–Pyarelal.The song Ek Do Teen was inspired by the opening bars of an old popular song "Chanda Mama Door Ke" composed by the famous yesteryears music composer Ravi for the film Vachan (1955). The film's soundtrack album sold more than 8 million units, becoming the second best-selling Bollywood music album of 1988, behind only Qayamat Se Qayamat Tak.

All tracks are written by Javed Akhtar.

No.	Title	Singer(s)	Length
1.	"So Gaya Yeh Jahan"	Nitin Mukesh, Shabbir Kumar & Alka Yagnik	06:04
2.	"Ek Do Teen"	Amit Kumar, Alka Yagnik	06:15
3.	"Keh Do Ke Tum"	Amit Kumar, Anuradha Paudwal	07:57
4.	"Tum Ko Hum Dilbar"	Sudesh Bhosle, Anuradha Paudwal	06:43
5.	"Dandia Music" (Instrumental)		04:47

Ek Do Teen was subsequently recreated for another movie Baaghi 2 (2018), sung this time by Shreya Ghoshal and another version sung by Palak Muchhal.

So Gaya Yeh Jahan was also remade for another film. In 2013, this song was remade for Nautanki Saala!, sung by Nitin Mukesh with composer Laxmikant–Pyarelal. In 2019, this song was remade again for the movie Bypass Road, sung by Nitin Mukesh featuring Jubin Nautiyal and Saloni Thakkar with composer Raaj Aashoo.

== Production ==
Aditya Pancholi was originally cast as the male lead.

== Awards ==
34th Filmfare Awards:

Won

- Best Actor – Anil Kapoor
- Best Female Playback Singer – Alka Yagnik for "Ek Do Teen"
- Best Choreography – Saroj Khan for "Ek Do Teen"
- Best Dialogue – Kamlesh Pandey

Nominated

- Best Film – N. Chandra
- Best Director – N. Chandra
- Best Actress – Madhuri Dixit
- Best Supporting Actor – Chunky Panday
- Best Music Director – Laxmikant–Pyarelal
- Best Lyricist – Javed Akhtar for "Ek Do Teen"
- Best Male Playback Singer – Amit Kumar for "Ek Do Teen"
- Best Female Playback Singer – Anuradha Paudwal for "Keh Do Ke Tum"
