= Yugpurush =

- Movie poster
- Directed by: Partho Ghosh
- Written by: Pradeep Ghatak (screenplay); Hriday Lani (dialogue)
- Produced by: Vijay Mehta
- Starring: Nana Patekar; Jackie Shroff; Manisha Koirala; Mohnish Bahl
- Cinematography: K. V. Ramanna
- Edited by: R. Rajendran
- Music by: Amar Haldipur; Rajesh Roshan
- Production company: Prathima Films
- Distributed by: Eros International
- Release date: 27 March 1998 (India)
- Country: India
- Language: Hindi
- Budget: ₹5.25 crore
- Box office: ₹4.93 crore

Yugpurush is a 1998 Indian Drama film directed by Partho Ghosh and produced by Vijay Mehta. The film stars Nana Patekar, Jackie Shroff, Mohnish Bahl and Manisha Koirala in the title roles. It is an adaptation of the 1969 Bengali film Aparichita, which itself is based on Fyodor Dostoyevsky's novel The Idiot.

== Cast ==
- Nana Patekar as Anirudh
- Jackie Shroff as Ranjan
- Manisha Koirala as Sunita
- Mohnish Bahl as Mohnish
- Ashwini Bhave as Deepti
- Yashwant Dutt as Doctor
- Shivaji Satam as Paresh
- Mohan Joshi as Mohan
- Sulbha Deshpande as Mrs. Simran Mohan
- Ravi Patwardhan as Ranjan's Father
- Jayant Sawarkar as Mohnish's Father

== Plot ==
Anirudh is released from a facility that treats patients with mental ailments. Anirudh also happens to be an exceptional artist and does portraits of new people he meets. He come to live with Mr. Kapoor's family. Mrs Kapoor is his mother's friend. Kapoor's daughter Deepti silently loves Anirudh. As he struggles with adjusting with the "normal" world, he encounters Sunita, an escort and Ranjan, the son of a renowned politician. Ranjan, is madly in love with Sunita, but Sunita does not feel the same way about him. Anirudh is the only person to see beyond Sunita’s seemingly comfortable and affluent existence and knows that deep down she is extremely sad and alone. They develop a special bond of friendship despite their vastly different personalities and backgrounds. Anirudh also becomes good friends with Ranjan. Ranjan is a good-hearted but egotistical man who cannot bear even the thought of failure in any aspect of his life. Can he handle Sunita’s rejection? Can he deal with the fact that Sunita feels closer to Anirudh than him? Will Sunita find happiness? And, most importantly, will Anirudh survive in this "sane" world?

== Music ==
The music of the film was composed by Rajesh Roshan and Amar Parshuram Haldipur, while the sound mixing was done by Hitendra Ghosh and Buta Singh. The lyrics of the film were penned by Majrooh Sultanpuri under the music company T-Series.

=== Track listing ===
No.	Title	Singer(s)	Length
1.	"Bandhan Khula Panchhi Udaa"	Anuradha Sriram, Lehmber Hussainpuri	4:52
2.	"Chale Hum Do Jan Sair Ko"	Kumar Sanu, Hariharan	5:42
3.	"Yeh Jeevan Path Mera"	Ravindra Sathe	5:27
4.	"Koi Jaise Mere Dil Ka"	Asha Bhosle	5:11
5.	"Kanhaiya Se Kahiyo"	Ravindra Sathe	6:17
6.	"Hello Hello Aayee"	Alka Yagnik	7:03
7.	"Ae Meri Jaan Main"	Sonu Nigam, Kavita Paudwal	6:17
8.	"Aaya Tha Churane"	Anuradha Paudwal, Abhijeet	4:18
9.	"Phoolon Ke Sang Bhanware"	Anuradha Paudwal, M. M. Kreem	5:21
