= N. Chandra =

Indian producer, writer, and director

- Born: Chandrashekhar Narvekar; 4 April 1952 (age 74)
- Occupations: Film director, producer, screenwriter, editor
- Notable work: Ankush; Pratighaat; Tezaab; Narsimha

Chandrashekhar Narvekar (born 4 April 1952) is an Indian director, producer and writer, known for gritty realism, in his early dark and loud films. His most successful commercial films are Ankush (1986), Pratighaat (1987), Tezaab (1988) and Narsimha (1991).

Chandra also made moderately successful but critically scorned Humlaa, Style and its sequel Xcuse Me.

== Early life ==
He was born in Mumbai, Maharashtra, India. Chandra grew up in a middle-class neighbourhood in Worli Naka.

== Career ==
=== Breakthrough ===
After his schooling, he started his career as a film editor at Film Centre in Tardeo, Mumbai, where his father worked. He received his first break in the film industry, when in 1971, as a clapper boy in Gulzar's Parichay (1972). Gradually moving up as film editor and assistant director. He worked as an associate director and editor in Anil Kapoor starrer Woh 7 Din (1983).

Eventually, with Ankush, his directorial debut, in 1986, Chandra began his projection of the angry young man. Influenced by Gulzar's Mere Apne, he wrote, directed, produced and edited the film about four frustrated unemployed men who roam the streets of Bombay, which also starred Nana Patekar. Made at a budget of Rs 12 lakh, the film and grossed Rs 95 lakh to become surprise hit of 1986, the year when many blockbusters failed.

The following year he remade Telugu film, Pratighatana (1986) in Hindi as Pratighaat (1987), starring Sujata Mehta and Nana Patekar, a film on the gruesome reality of politics in India. It also brought the strong mental make-up of the Indian woman to the thoughts of the Indian youth.

In 1988, he made Tezaab, the film that effectively launched Madhuri Dixit's career. It was the beginning of the Bollywood diva's long and relatively successful pairing with Anil Kapoor, and her mastery of dancing through the song Ek Do Teen. With Tezaab, N Chandra scored a box office hat-trick at his previous hits, Ankush (1986) and Pratighaat (1987).

In 1991, his successful streak continued with Narsimha, his fourth consecutive hit at the box-office. He wrote, produced and directed the film, which starred Sunny Deol, Dimple Kapadia and Urmila Matondkar.

== Filmography ==
As a director:

Year	Film	Director	Producer	Editor	Writer	Lead cast
1986	Ankush	Yes	Yes	Yes	Yes	Madan Jain, Arjun Chakraborty, Nana Patekar, Nisha Singh, Suhas Palshikar
1987	Pratighaat	Yes		Yes	Yes	Sujata Mehta, Charan Raj
1988	Tezaab	Yes	Yes	Yes	Yes	Anil Kapoor, Madhuri Dixit, Chunky Pandey, Anupam Kher
1991	Narsimha	Yes	Yes	Yes	Yes	Sunny Deol, Dimple Kapadia, Urmila Matondkar, Om Puri
1992	Humlaa	Yes			Yes	Dharmendra, Anil Kapoor, Meenakshi Seshadri, Kimi Katkar
1993	Yugandhar	Yes			Yes	
1994	Tejaswini	Yes				
1996	Beqabu	Yes	Yes		Yes	
1998	Wajood	Yes	Yes		Yes	Madhuri Dixit, Nana Patekar, Mukul Dev
2000	Shikari	Yes				Govinda, Tabu, Karisma Kapoor
2001	Style	Yes	Yes		Yes	
2003	Xcuse Me	Yes	Yes			
2003	Kagaar: Life on the Edge	Yes				Om Puri, Nandita Das
2009	Y.M.I : Yeh Mera India	Yes	Yes		Yes	

As an editor only:

Year	Film
1983	Woh Saat Din
1984	Dharm Aur Qanoon
1985	Mohabbat
1986	Mera Dharam
