= Mohan Gokhale =

Indian actor (1953–1999)

- Born: 7 November 1953; Belgaum, Karnataka State, India
- Died: 29 April 1999 (aged 45); Chennai, Tamil Nadu, India
- Spouse: Shubhangi Gokhale (m. 1989)
- Children: Sakhi Gokhale (daughter)

Mohan Gokhale (7 November 1953 – 29 April 1999) was an Indian film, television and theater actor who has worked in art films such as Sparsh, Bhavni Bhavai and Mirch Masala. His father was a senior journalist and Editor of the weekly Swarajya and Assistant Editor of Sakal in Pune.

== Career ==
Mohan Gokhale was passionate about theatre since his childhood and had won many awards for the same during his college days and even at the state level. He founded the Theatre Academy at Pune and directed Nana Patekar's first Marathi play, Bhau Murarrao, which was written by Vijay Tendulkar. Gokhale's career in theatre began with Farari, which was directed by Ravindra Mankani. His work in Mahapur by Vijaya Mehta won him a state level award. His first play was Kasturimrug.

Gokhale debuted on television in the Marathi TV series, Shwetambara. Gokhale is best remembered for the popular comedy TV series, Mr. Yogi (1989), where he played the lead role of Yogesh Patel, an NRI from the United States who comes to India to get married and in the process meets 12 girls from 12 sun signs. That was later remade into a Hindi movie What's Your Raashee? directed by Ashutosh Gowarikar in 2009.

He has acted in many films in Marathi and Hindi, including Hech Maze Maher (alongside Reema Lagoo), Mirch Masala (alongside Smita Patil and Naseeruddin Shah) and Banya Bapu (by Govind Kulkarni in 1977). He portrayed Gandhi in Dr Babasaheb Ambedkar by Jabbar Patel in 2000. He began acting in films with the Marathi movie Maaficha Sakshidar, which was directed by Rajdutt and based on Pune's Joshi-Abhyankar serial murders. He also acted in Rajdutt's Aaj Zale Muksta Mee, alongside Madhu Kambikar. He even acted in Bharat Ek Khoj in various roles.

== Personal life ==
Mohan Gokhale was married to Shubhangi Gokhale. They performed together in Mr Yogi. Shubhangi took a break of around 10 years from television and plays after her marriage with Mohan Gokhale. They had a daughter. Their daughter Sakhi Gokhale is also an actress.

== Death ==
Gokhale died in his sleep of a heart attack in Chennai on 29 April 1999. He was working on Kamal Haasan's Hey Ram at the time, along with the TV shows Alpaviram, Zanjeerein and Aashirvad. Moksha (2001 film) was his last film.

== Filmography ==
=== Gujarati ===
- Bhavni Bhavai (1980)
- Hun Hunshi Hunshilal (1992)

=== Marathi ===
- Maaficha Sakshidar (1986) as Sunil
- Banya Bapu (1977)
- Aaj Jhale Mukt Mi (1986)
- Thakas Mahathak (1984)
- Hech Majhe Maher (1984)
- Jagavegali Prem Kahani (1984)
- Sansar pakhrancha (1983)

=== Hindi ===
- Sparsh (1980)
- Aadat Se Majboor (1981)
- Mohan Joshi Hazir Ho! (1984)
- Holi (1984) (uncredited)
- Mirch Masala (1985)
- Lekhu (1986)
- Hero Hiralal (1988)
- Aranyaka (1994)
- Ajeeb Itefaq (1989)
- Moksha (2001 film)

=== English ===
- Mississippi Masala (1991) as Pontiac
- Dr. Babasaheb Ambedkar (2000) as M. K. Gandhi

=== Television ===
- Yatra (1986)
- Aahat (1996-1998)
- Bharat Ek Khoj (1988)
- Mr Yogi (1989)
- Lekhu (1986)
- CID (1998-1999)
- Alpviram
- Yugantar
- Mitti Ke Rang
- Shwetambara
- Shaktimaan, as The Invisible Man

=== Marathi plays ===
- Kasturimruga
- Savitri
- Mahapoor
- Mickey and Memsaab
- Ghashiram Kotwal
- Sooryachi Pille
- Denaryache Haat Hajar
- Hurry Up Hari
- Gidhade
- Naru ani Janhavi
- Doctor Tumhisuddha
- Hasa phoolano hasa
- Mee kumar
- Baby
- Shortcut
- Serial Dekho Magar Pyarse
- Yatra
- Lekhu
- Dopahar ka theherav
- Bhanvar
- Junoon
- Jamir
- Ujale ki Aur
- Shaktimaan
- Duniya Rang Rangilee
- Maat
- Kaid
- Lift
- Tee yete
- Badam Rani Chaukat Gulam
