= Hum Dono (1995 film) =

- Promotional Poster
- Directed by: Shafi Inamdar
- Produced by: Ravi Malhotra
- Starring: Rishi Kapoor; Nana Patekar; Pooja Bhatt
- Music by: Anand–Milind
- Production company: R. M Films
- Release date: 11 August 1995
- Country: India
- Language: Hindi

Hum Dono (English: Two of us) is a 1995 Indian action thriller film starring Rishi Kapoor, Nana Patekar, Pooja Bhatt. The movie was the only directorial movie for actor Shafi Inamdar.

== Plot ==
Vishal's father Vikram Saigal made a will which shall be executed with the consonance of his step brother Raju. Vishal hates Raju and his lower class lifestyle but is forced to team up with Raju for the property. Raju has love interest with Priyanka and he needs Vishal's help.

== Cast ==
- Rishi Kapoor as Rajesh Saigal "Raju"
- Nana Patekar as Vishal Saigal
- Pooja Bhatt as Priyanka Gupta
- Mohnish Behl as Sameer Choudhury
- Mohan Joshi as Shreechand
- Aloknath as Vikram Saigal
- Mahavir Shah as Priyanka's Father
- Prashant Subhedar as Arjun Chaudhary AKA Bhaiji.
- Anant Mahadevan as Mahadevan.
- Jack Gaud as Shobhraj.

== Soundtrack ==
| # | Title | Singer(s) |
|---|---|---|
| 1 | "Ek Ladki Hai Deewani Si" | Kumar Sanu, Sadhana Sargam |
| 2 | "Meri Wafa Meri Dua" | Abhijeet, Sadhana Sargam |
| 3 | "Ambar Ki Chandni" | Udit Narayan, Ravindra Sathe |
| 4 | "Pyar Ki Gaadi" | Kumar Sanu, Poornima |
| 5 | "Aaya Mausam Hum Dono" | Udit Narayan, Alka Yagnik |
| 6 | "Kabhi Dushman" | Udit Narayan, Ravindra Sathe |
| 7 | "Aao Milke Ise Chalaayen" | Kumar Sanu, Udit Narayan |
