= Joshi-Abhyankar serial murders =

About serial murders in 1976 (Pune, India)

The Joshi-Abhyankar serial murders were ten murders committed by Rajendra Jakkal (25), Dilip Sutar (21), Shantaram Kanhoji Jagtap (23), and Munawar Harun Shah (21) of Pune, India, between January 1976 and March 1977. All the murderers were commercial art students at the Abhinav Kala Mahavidyalaya, Tilak Road, and were hanged for their crimes on 27 November 1983. The group had acquired a poor reputation on their college campus for robbery and drinking.

== Timeline ==
=== 16 January 1976 – Prakash Hegde ===
Prakash was a classmate of the killers at Abhinav. His father, Sundar Hegde, ran a small restaurant (Vishwa) behind Abhinav Kala Mahavidyalaya. The group hatched a plot to kidnap Prakash for ransom. On 15 January 1976, the foursome and classmate Suhas Chandak picked up Prakash under false pretence and took him to Jakkal's tin shed on Karve Road. They forced him to write a note to his father saying that he was leaving home. On the night of 16 January 1976, they gagged him, and took him to Peshwe Park, which is just meters from Hotel Vishwa. There they strangled him with a nylon rope, placed his body in an iron barrel, inserted some stones and dumped the barrel into the Park lake. The next day, they sent a ransom note to his father.

=== August 1976 – Kolhapur ===
The gang moved to the city of Kolhapur, but were unsuccessful when they targeted the house of a local businessman, Arvind Kashid. On the night of 8 August, they visited Kashid’s house under the pretext of discussing a business matter but were initially denied entry by his wife. They returned the following night and were allowed inside after Kashid arrived home. After assessing the situation, including Kashid’s physical build and the house’s location in a densely populated area, the gang abandoned the attempt and returned to Pune.

=== 31 October 1976 – Joshi ===
Achyut Joshi, from Vijaynagar colony, was attacked on the night of 31 October. The group, brandishing knives, forced their way into his house. Joshi and his wife Usha were the only ones at home. After tying the couple's hands and legs, the four strangled Joshi with nylon rope and suffocated his wife. When the Joshis' teenage son, Anand, arrived home, they stripped him naked and strangled him with nylon rope. The gang then stole several items, including a mangalsutra, a watch and several thousand rupees.

=== 22 November 1976 – Bafana ===
Yashomati Bafana's bungalow on Shankarseth Road was attacked on the evening of 22 November. However, Bafana and her two servants fought back and the assailants escaped by climbing a barbed-wire fence around the perimeter.

=== 1 December 1976 – Abhyankar ===
On 1 December 1976, at around 8 pm, the group attacked the Smriti bungalow on Bhandarkar Road belonging to the Abhyankars. There were five people in the house: noted Sanskrit scholar Kashinath Shastri Abhyankar (age 88); his wife Indirabai (age 76); their maid Sakubai Wagh (age 60), granddaughter Jui (age 20) and grandson Dhananjay (age 22). The four gained entrance by ringing the doorbell. When Dhananjay opened the door, they stuffed his mouth with a ball of cloth, tied his hands and told him to direct them inside the house. The men killed each person by stuffing their mouths with a ball of cloth, tying their hands and legs and then strangling them with a nylon rope. The granddaughter, Jui, was stripped naked and forced to direct them to the valuables in the house before she was killed.

=== 23 March 1977 – Anil Gokhale ===
Anil Gokhale was the younger brother of a college friend, Jayant Gokhale. On the evening of 23 March 1977, Anil was supposed to meet his brother at the Alka Talkies and was offered a ride home by Jakkal on his motorcycle. He was taken to Jakkal's shed and strangled with a nylon rope. His body was tied to an iron ladder, weighed down with boulders and dumped into the Mula-Mutha River near Bund Garden.

== Investigation ==
Assistant Commissioner of Police Madhusudan Hulyalkar led the investigation. On the evening of 24 March 1977, the body of Anil Gokhale surfaced near Yerwada. The police team, led by Police Inspector Manikrao Damame, noticed that the nylon ropes used to tie the body to the ladder were fastened in a manner identical to earlier murders. The police had initially thought the murders were a result of botched robberies but were soon faced with the fact that they were following a group of serial killers. Cases like these were rare at that time in India, and the police began an intensive investigation to prevent additional deaths. When questioned by police, the four men contradicted each other about their movements in the city over the previous week. Satish Gore (a colleague) cracked under questioning, leaking information about Prakash Hegde's murder and the location of his body. The signatures of strangulation with nylon rope and a specific knot also helped police zero in on the culprits. Further confessions were made by another classmate, Suhas Chandak, who was a witness to the Hegde killing. The killers were apprehended on 30 March 1977.

=== Court case ===
Shamrao G. Samant, a senior criminal lawyer who had conducted many successful prosecutions for the state government, was appointed special public prosecutor for the trial. The case began on 15 May 1978 in Pune district and lasted more than four months. On 28 September 1978, they were sentenced to death by Pune Sessions Court Judge Waman Narayan Bapat. Their sentences were confirmed by the Bombay High Court on 6 April 1979, and their special leave petitions against their convictions and sentences were dismissed by the Supreme Court on 17 November 1980.

=== Appeal and execution ===
After both the High Court and Supreme Court turned down their appeals, the accused approached the President of India for a pardon. The pardon was not granted, and the four were hanged at Yerwada Central Jail on 27 November 1983.

== In popular culture ==
The serial murders have had a lasting impact on popular culture in India, spanning several decades. Some of the more notable pieces to stem from these events are:

- Yes, I Am Guilty (1983) - A Marathi book written by Munawar Shah, one of the murderers. He was the youngest of the four members to commit the violent crimes, and wrote this autobiography while imprisoned.
- Maaficha Sakshidar (1986) - A Marathi film starring Nana Patekar and Mohan Gokhale. The film was based on the execution of the four students who were convicted of ten murders. Patekar played Rajendra Jakkal, in one of his earliest film roles.
- Paanch (2003) - A film directed by Anurag Kashyap. Kashyap's film is "loosely" based on the serial murders, and was never given a theatrical or home-video release. The Central Board of Film Certification objected to the film's violence, its depiction of drug abuse, and profanity. However, the film was later screened at several film festivals.
- November 27 (2020) - A play by actor-writer Naren Weiss. The play was later published in Deepak and Raj: Two Indian Plays, which went on to reach #1 on Amazon's playwriting list for 2020.

In addition to these books and films, the Joshi-Abhyankar serial murders have also been featured in episodes of true crime TV series such as Savdhaan India (2012) and Crime Patrol (2015).

== See also ==
- Auto Shankar
- Charles Shobraj
- Noida serial murders
- Raman Raghav
- Stoneman
