= Maaficha Sakshidar =

- Film poster
- Directed by: Rajdutt
- Based on: Joshi-Abhyankar serial murders
- Produced by: Hiralal M. Shah
- Starring: Nana Patekar; Mohan Gokhale; Avinash Kharshikar; Usha Naik
- Music by: Vishwanath More
- Release date: 1986
- Running time: 132 minutes
- Country: India
- Language: Marathi

Maaficha Sakshidar (lit. 'Witness to the prosecution') is a 1986 Indian Marathi film directed by Rajdutt, starring Nana Patekar, Mohan Gokhale, Avinash Kharshikar and Usha Naik. The film is based on the infamous Joshi-Abhyankar serial murders which took place in Pune during 1976-77.

== Plot ==
Based on a true story (the infamous Joshi-Abhyankar serial murders which took place in Pune in 1976-77), this movie deals with the execution of four commercial art students after they were convicted of ten murders. Later on, on this incident, Anurag Kashyap made his film Paanch.

== Cast ==
- Nana Patekar as Raghavendra "Raghava"
- Mohan Gokhale as Sunil "Sunya"
- Bipin Varti as Rakesh "Rocky"
- Kishore Jadhav as Manohar
- Avinash Kharshikar as Vilas Modak
- Usha Naik as Geeta, Sunil's girlfriend
- Jayram Kulkarni as College Professor
- Arun Sarnaik as Lawyer (Public Prosecutor)
- Kamlakar Sarang as Defence Lawyer
- Datta Bhat as Judge
- Ravi Patwardhan as Police Inspector Jadhav
- Ashalata Wabgaonkar as Sunil's mother
- Sumati Gupte as Raghavendra Mother
- Bindu as Dancer in Restaurant/Bar (Guest Appearance)
- Padma Khanna in a guest appearance in the song "Shama Ne Jab Aag"
- Irshad Hashmi as Commissioner
- Vasant Shinde as police constable

== Music ==
Music composed by Vishwanath More.

1. "Jeevan Mein Aayi Nasha"
2. "Rangale Nave Nave Swapna"
