= Ravi Patwardhan =

Indian actor (1937–2020)

- Born: 6 September 1937; Bombay Presidency, British India
- Died: 6 December 2020 (aged 83); Thane, Maharashtra, India
- Years active: 1964–2020

Ravi Patwardhan (6 September 1937 – 6 December 2020) was an Indian actor who appeared in Marathi-language and Hindi-language movies and TV serials and theater plays. He started his acting career in Marathi theatre, then pivoted to movies, and in the later part of career worked in TV shows. In the 80s and 90s, he was known for playing towering personalities as public prosecutor, judge, politician, and village Patil in films. This identity was further aided by his strong delivery and trademark handlebar moustache. Patwardhan acted in more than 200 films, 150 plays, and many TV serials.

== Early life ==
Patwardhan was born on September 6, 1937, during the British Raj. His first acting experience came at an early age of 6.5 years during the 1944 Marathi Natya Mahotsav.

== Career ==
Patwardhan initially worked at the Reserve Bank in Mumbai and took time off to work in experimental plays.

=== Theater ===
Patwardhan began his career with an experimental Marathi theatre and was a noted personality in the scene. His first theater gig came in 1964 when he played Mukund Pradhan in the Katha Kunachi Wyatha Kunala by Go Gam Parkhi.

In 1974, Patwardhan started gaining recognition for playing Dhritarashtra in a Ratnakar Matkari play named Aranyak. This play narrates the debilitation and despair of elderly constituents of Mahabharata epic in the aftermath of battle. He played the part of Dhritarashtra since the first play in 1974, as well as when it was revived in 2018.

In 1970s, he acted in Hridayaswamini directed by M.G. Ranganekar & Yashwant Pagar's Prapanch Karava Netka. He played Beckett in Kusumagraj's translation of Becket by Jean Anouilh. He played a major part in Pu La Deshpande's Tujha Aahe Tujhpashi. He adeptly handled the one-man show Swagat also written by Pu La (transl. of Prison Diary by Jayaprakash Narayan). Later, he got roles in plays such as Vij Mhanali Dhartila, Kaunteya, Anand. He later played the role of police in Vijaya Mehta’s plays based on Joshi-Abhyankar serial murders. He also worked with noted director Sombhu Mitra in Indian National Theatre's Kondi, the Marathi adaptation of An Enemy of the People by Norwegian playwright Henrik Ibsen.

=== Film ===
Patwardhans Marathi movie credits includes roles in Sinhasan (1979), Umbartha (1982), Bin Kamacha Navra (1984), Ashya Asawya Suna, and many more. His Hindi movie credits includes roles in Ankush (1986), Pratighat (1987), Tezaab (1988), Yeshwant (1997), Thakshak (1999), and Grahan (2001).

=== TV ===
Patwardhan gained fame all over Maharashtra for playing Vastad Patil in the Gappagoshti section of the Amchi Mati Amchi Manasa (transl. Our soil, Our people) show. This agriculture focused series was produced by Mansingh Pawar and aired on DD Sahyadri in the 90s.

Patwardhan's last role was in a Marathi TV show Aggabai Sasubai airing on Zee Marathi. His character Dattatray Kulkarni aka Ajoba was dear to many Marathi households and won him awards.

== Awards ==
Patwardhan received the Savarkar Smriti Award in 2018. In 2019, he won the Best father-in-law Award during the Zee Marathi Awards for his role in Aggabai Sasubai serial.

== Death ==
Patwardhan died of a heart attack on 6 December 2020 in Panchpakhadi, Thane and was cremated at Jawaharbagh Cemetery and many celebrities attended his funeral. He was survived by his wife, sons, daughter, daughters-in-law, son-in-law and grandchildren.
