= Yeshwant =

- Directed by: Anil Matto
- Written by: Anil Mattoo; Hriday Lani
- Story by: Shahab Shamsi
- Produced by: Narottam. V. Purohit; Vijay K. Ranglani
- Starring: Nana Patekar; Madhoo; Atul Agnihotri; Mohan Joshi; Shafi Inamdar
- Cinematography: Shankar Bardhan
- Edited by: Kuldip Mehan
- Music by: Anand–Milind
- Production company: Shalimar International
- Distributed by: Shalimar International
- Release date: 7 February 1997
- Language: Hindi
- Budget: ₹5.75 crore
- Box office: ₹19.10 crore

Yeshwant is a 1997 Indian action crime film directed by Anil Mattoo, produced by Vijay K. Ranglani. It stars Nana Patekar and Madhoo in pivotal roles. Also, it was the final film of Shafi Inamdar, who died a year before the release. The film was a success on the box office.

== Plot ==
Inspector Yeshwant Lohar is a plainclothes police detective. His wife is Ragini. Yeshwant wants her to concentrate on studies so that she may join the Indian Administrative Service (IAS).

Yeshwant goes undercover as a beggar to catch a drug dealer, Salim Shaikh. Salim is sent to prison, and Lohar is ostensibly praised by his superior, Chopra. However, Chopra is corrupt, and in actuality, is in Salim's pay. Chopra frames Lohar for murder and gets him sent to prison as well.

Meanwhile, Ragini is selected as an IAS, and joins as a Deputy Collector. She suspects Salim of framing her husband, and lets Salim know that she is watching him closely. Salim becomes alarmed and tries to silence Ragini. She rejects his bribe offers and escapes the thugs hired by Salim to intimidate her.

Salim plots to defame Ragini. She has been attacked, so he assigns John Frank, an old friend of Ragini, as her police guard. Salim then spreads allegations of a love affair between them, supported by faked pictures of Frank and Ragini in a compromising position. The minister, who is a womaniser, scolds her and also tries to hug her. Salim shows the pictures to Yeshwant, who avoids Ragini during conjugal visits, and releases them to the press, discrediting her with the public.

Yeshwant is released from prison, and confronts Ragini. She pleads with him to believe she is faithful. Yeshwant is enraged, and goes on a killing spree. He kills Salim's accomplices, and then kills Salim himself while he is engaged in an illegal drug deal. With Salim's crimes revealed, Yeshwant is vindicated.

== Cast ==
- Nana Patekar as Inspector Yashwant Lohar
- Madhoo as Ragini Yashwant Lohar, IAS Deputy Collector
- Atul Agnihotri as Sub Inspector John Frank
- Shafi Inamdar as Adv. Vikram
- Mohan Joshi as Salim Shaikh
- Shivaji Satam as Inspector Joshi
- Ravi Patwardhan as Police Commissioner
- Achyut Potdar as Kale, IAS Collector
- Vikas Anand as Dr. Godbole
- Razak Khan as dancer
- Gavin Packard as Salim's Goon
- Ashok Shinde as Chief Minister's Son
- Usha Nadkarni as Slum dweller Women who saves Ragini from goons (Special Appearance)
- Kishore Nandlaskar as Slum dweller Women Usha Nadkarni Husband (Special Appearance)
- Makarand Anaspure as Eye Witness
- Pramod Pawar as Press Reporter

== Soundtrack ==
One of the dialogs in the film "Ek Machchar" was released as a song with background female vocals. The dialogue's popularity contributed to the success of the film.

#	Title	Singer(s)
1	"Ambar Se Noor Liya"	Kumar Sanu
2	"Badi Mushkil Mein"	Suresh Wadkar, Sadhana Sargam
3	"Ek Machhar"	Nana Patekar
4	"Jai Jai Jagdambe Kaali"	Ravindra Sathe
5	"Saanware Aai Jaiyo"	Ravindra Sathe
6	"Tum Samne Baitho"	Kumar Sanu
7	"Kadak Laxmi Aali"	Ravindra Sathe
