= Pratighaat (1987 film) =

- Poster
- Directed by: N. Chandra
- Screenplay by: T. Krishna; N. Chandra; Jalees (dialogue)
- Story by: T. Krishna
- Based on: Pratighatana by T. Krishna
- Produced by: Ramoji Rao
- Starring: Sujata Mehta; Rohini Hattangadi; Charan Raj; Arvind Kumar
- Cinematography: H. Laxminarayan
- Edited by: N. Chandra
- Music by: Ravindra Jain
- Production company: Ushakiran Movies
- Release date: 17 March 1987
- Running time: 164 minutes
- Country: India
- Language: Hindi

Pratighaat (transl. The Backlash (repercussion)) is a 1987 Hindi feminist drama film directed by N. Chandra, starring Sujata Mehta in the lead. It is a remake of the Telugu film Pratighatana (1985), directed by T. Krishna, with Vijayshanti in the lead.

Made on a low budget, and with no big stars, it went on to become a hit, making Rs. 8 crore at the box office. It became part of the hat-trick of hit films by N. Chandra, Ankush (1986), Pratighaat and Tezaab (1988).

== Plot ==
The film deals with politics-criminal nexus and a college lecturer who takes them on, even after she faces public disrobing. She finally takes the law into her own hands to avenge her insult.

== Cast ==
- Sujata Mehta as Laxmi S. Joshi
- Arvind Kumar as Advocate Satyaprakash Joshi
- Charan Raj as Kali Prasad
- Rohini Hattangadi as Durga
- Gyan Shivpuri as Durga's Husband
- Mohan Bhandari as Police Inspector Ajay Srivastav
- Ashok Saraf as Lawyer, assistant to Kali
- Nana Patekar as Ex-Constable Karamveer
- Subbiraj as Laxmi's father
- Usha Nadkarni as Laxmi's mother-in-Law
- Kota Srinivasa Rao
- Ravi Patwardhan

== Music ==
Lyrics: Ravindra Jain

1. "Tere Sar Pe Mere" – S. Janaki, S. P. Balasubrahmanyam
2. "Hamre Balma Beimaan" – S. P. Balasubrahmanyam
3. "Likhungi Mahabharat Naya" – S. Janaki
4. "Sara Nagar Aap Hi Ke Saath Hai" – Guru Dutt, Mohammad Aziz
