= Angaar (1992 film) =

- Poster
- Directed by: Shashilal K. Nair
- Written by: Kader Khan; Sujit Sen
- Produced by: Shashilal K. Nair; S.M. Arif
- Starring: Jackie Shroff; Dimple Kapadia; Nana Patekar
- Cinematography: Ishwar R. Bidri
- Edited by: Waman B. Bhosle; Gurudutt Shirali
- Music by: Laxmikant–Pyarelal
- Release date: 11 September 1992
- Country: India
- Language: Hindi

Angaar (transl. Embers (Live coal)) is a 1992 Indian Hindi-language crime drama film directed by Shashilal K. Nair. The film stars Jackie Shroff, Dimple Kapadia in lead roles, along with Nana Patekar, Om Puri, Kader Khan, Kiran Kumar in supporting roles. The film was speculated to have been based on the life of Karim Lala.

== Plot ==
Unemployed and branded a troublemaker, Jaikishan lives a poor lifestyle in a slum-area called Asha Colony, very near Andheri's Lokhandwala Complex, Mumbai along with his sister, Seema, mom and dad. He comes to the rescue of a homeless orphan, Mili, who suffers from a deep inferiority complex, and permits her to live with his family. Brutally outspoken, he believes that India should be awarded unlimited gold medals for corruption at all levels, fully aware that these beliefs portray him as a "revolutionary" and prevent him from securing any gainful employment. His life will be turned upside down when he refuses to go along with the plans of the Khan family - consisting of builder, Majid, his goon brother, Farid, and their seemingly benevolent father, Jahangir. His family will also be traumatized after the Police arrest him for the alleged broad-daylight murder of Farid.

== Cast ==
- Jackie Shroff as Jaikishan "Jaggu"
- Dimple Kapadia as Mili
- Nana Patekar as Majid Khan
- Om Puri as Parvez Hussain
- Kader Khan as Jahangir Khan
- Kiran Kumar as Anwar Khan
- Mazhar Khan as Farid Khan
- Achyut Potdar as Jaggu's Father
- Sulbha Deshpande as Jaggu's Mother
- Neena Gupta as Majid's Wife
- Firoz Irani as State Mental Asylum Doctor
- Anang Desai as State Mental Asylum Doctor
- Tom Alter as Public Prosecutor
- Chandrakant Gokhale as Defence Lawyer
- Virendra Saxena as Police Commissioner Sahni
- Ajit Vachani as Hirwani
- Lalit Mohan Tiwari as Psychiatrist
- Sudhir as Health Minister

== Reception ==
The film was the 9th highest-grossing film in India in 1992. The National Film Development Corporation of India described it as "an urban action film". The Times of India called it "one of the most engaging mafia films to have come out of Bollywood", attributed to it being "quite a dark film". According to The Hindu, Angaar "was, in a way, a first of its kind, in that the film gave us within the mainstream cinema framework a fairly authoritative account of the alleged nexus between the underworld and the politicians who manipulated the law and order machinery to suit their nefarious activities." It further mentioned that the film had a "deep concern for contemporary life" which gave it a "distinctive touch".

== Awards ==
- Filmfare Best Villain Award - Nana Patekar
- Filmfare Award for Best Dialogue - Kader Khan
- Filmfare Award for Best Art Direction - R. Verman Shetty
- National Film Award for Best Special Effects - Shashilal K. Nair
- Bengal Film Journalists' Association Awards - Best Supporting Actor (Hindi) - Nana Patekar

== Soundtrack ==
Song	Singer
"Idhar Dekho"	S. P. Balasubrahmanyam
"Mushkil Mein Hai"	S. P. Balasubrahmanyam
"Mushkil Mein Hai"	Lata Mangeshkar
"Kitni Jaldi Yeh Mulaqat Guzar Jati"	Lata Mangeshkar, Roop Kumar Rathod
"Chal Aage Aur Dekh Peechhe"	Kavita Krishnamurthy, Sudesh Bhosle
