= Wajood (1998 film) =

- Directed by: N. Chandra
- Written by: N. Chandra; Kamlesh Pandey(dialogues)
- Story by: N. Chandra
- Produced by: Jayashri N. Chandra; N. Chandra
- Starring: Nana Patekar; Madhuri Dixit; Mukul Dev; Ramya Krishnan
- Cinematography: W. B. Rao
- Edited by: Prashant Khedekar; Vinod Nayak
- Music by: Anu Malik
- Distributed by: Asian Video Wholesalers
- Release date: 11 December 1998
- Running time: 179 minutes
- Country: India
- Language: Hindi
- Box office: Rs. 9,75,00,000

Wajood (transl. Existence) is a 1998 Indian Hindi-language action film directed and produced by N. Chandra. The film features Nana Patekar and Madhuri Dixit in lead roles.

== Plot ==
Malhar, who is born to a poor typist clerk, is a versatile artist who wins trophies in dramas but is never appreciated by his father. While writing and directing dramas in college, he meets Apoorva, a rich girl, and falls madly in love with her. When she wins the Best Actress Award, she calls upon Malhar on stage and gives all the credit to him. Malhar misunderstands this gesture as Apoorva's love for him.

Meanwhile, Apoorva and Nihal fall in love with each other. Nihal's father, who is a wealthy bureaucrat, decides to get them married. Malhar assumes that this marriage is against Apoorva's will, and in his protest, Nihal's father accidentally gets killed, and Malhar is sent to jail. As Nihal loses his identity and status due to his father's death, Apoorva's father breaks off her engagement with Nihal. In jail, Malhar spends his days thinking of Apoorva, marrying her, having a child, and living happily with his father; all in one family.

Malhar escapes from jail and then starts making quick money in the wrong ways. He starts seducing rich women and then looting them. He finds an accomplice in Sofia, who helps him in these crimes. She falls madly in love with him, but he continues to love Apoorva. Nihal, a police officer now, happens to meet Apoorva, a journalist now, to solve the mystery of the "stranger murderer" in the city. The Police Commissioner is under great pressure from the local political leader and also the public to nab the culprit. He pressures Nihal to arrest Malhar within 24 hours; otherwise, he will suspend Nihal from the Police Force. On the other Hand, Malhar, who had allowed Nihal to live after his encounter with Apoorva, who clarified to Malhar, to his grave shock, that she had always loved Nihal from the Start. Malhar, realizing the consequences of his actions, tells Apoorva to come to the old theater, where they used to rehearse for One Last Play, for his old Father. On the other hand, when Sofia learns that Malhar does not love her but loves Apoorva, she is deeply disturbed and kills herself. Malhar watches her dead body in silence, then moves on to his final piece.

He goes to his father, makes him type an apology to himself, which is more like a eulogy applauding him (the son). He dresses his father in good clothes, takes him to a good restaurant, and then to the theatre. There with Apoorva, he enacts a realistic play, and uses a prop gun, unknown to Apoorva, who gets scared. Malhar challenges Apoorva to smile in the face of fear, a contrast to his first challenge, where he asked her to cry. Nihal, who had gotten the location of Malhar, thanks to a tip by a waiter at the hotel, appears at this exact moment. Fearing for the life of Apoorva, he shoots and kills Malhar, traumatizing Apoorva, who was just inches away from Malhar. He then goes to the stage, unintentionally stepping on a gun, revealing the fact to both of them, and both of them bitterly cry. Apoorva closes the eyes of Malhar's dead body, which still has a smile, a sign of Malhar's final lesson to Apoorva. Malhar's father finally appears on stage, who then accepts that Malhar was really a great actor, he coaxes Malhar to wake up and go with him, a sign of denial and profound grief felt by him.

The movie ends with a shot of Apoorva and Nihal sitting, crying and consoling each other at the stairs of the drama stage, while The Shadow of Malhar's head resting on his father's lap appears on the closed curtain.

== Cast ==
- Nana Patekar as Malhar Gopaldas Agnihotri / Col. Rathi
- Madhuri Dixit as Apurva Choudhury
- Mukul Dev as Nihal Joshi
- Ramya Krishnan as Shalini / Sofia / Amina
- Johnny Lever as Inspector Rahim Khan
- Dr. Hemu Adhikari as Gopaldas Raghavdas Agnihotri, Malhar's father
- Suhas Joshi as Mrs. Abhijeet Joshi
- Jagdeep as Bagh Singh
- Kunickaa Sadanand as Mrs. Chawla
- Sanjay Mishra as Kanchan (camera operator)
- Parikshit Sahni as Abhijeet Joshi, Nihal's father, in a special role
- Tej Sapru as Apoorva's boss
- Shivaji Satam as Police Commissioner of Mumbai
- Rajeev Verma as Mr. Choudhury, Apoorva's father
- Gulzar as himself (presenting the award) in a guest role

The film also features Rajdutt, Gick Grewal, Pushpa Verma, Geeta Shankar, Rajesh Singh, Paploo, Bhargava, Dhananjay, and Dilawar Khan.

== Soundtrack ==
Wajood

Soundtrack album by Anu Malik
- Released: 17 August 1998
- Genre: Feature film soundtrack
- Label: Saregama

All songs are composed by Anu Malik and penned by Javed Akhtar.

#	Title	Singer(s)
1	"Aur Hum Tum"	Kumar Sanu, Alka Yagnik
2	"Kaise Bataaoon Main"	Nana Patekar
3	"Ki Tut Gayi Tadak Karke"	Sapna Awasthi, Kavita Krishnamurthy
4	"Main Kya Karoon"	Alka Yagnik
5	"Main Sochta Hoon Tumhaari"	Kumar Sanu, Alka Yagnik
6	"Sanam Tum Hum Pe Marte Ho"	Udit Narayan, Kavita Krishnamurthy
