= Prahaar: The Final Attack =

1991 Indian film by Nana Patekar

Prahaar
- Poster
- Directed by: Nana Patekar
- Written by: Hriday Lani; Nana Patekar; Sujit Sen
- Screenplay by: Sujit Sen; Nana Patekar
- Produced by: Sudhakar Bokade
- Starring: Nana Patekar; Madhuri Dixit; Dimple Kapadia; Habib Tanvir; Gautam Joglekar
- Cinematography: Debu Deodhar
- Edited by: Afaque Husain
- Music by: Laxmikant–Pyarelal
- Distributed by: Divya Films Combines; Worldwide Entertainment Group
- Release date: 29 November 1991 (India)
- Running time: 168 mins
- Country: India
- Language: Hindi

Prahaar (transl. Attack) is a 1991 Indian Hindi-language action drama film, written and directed by Nana Patekar. The film was nominated for Best Story at the 37th Filmfare Awards of India.

== Plot ==
2nd Lt. Peter D'Souza is an Indian Army officer who wants to join his battalion's specialist commando platoon. His father John D'Souza wants Peter to run the family bakery after him, his fiancée Shirley wants him to marry her while his neighbour Kiran tells Peter to follow his heart. Peter leaves for commando training at the Maratha Light Infantry Regimental Centre.

Enter Major V.S. Chavan. Chavan is described as a nightmare for every aspiring cadet, and he proves that the "honour" is well deserved. Under his leadership, cadets get exhausted in commando training. He has a sordid past; his mother was a prostitute. That was the last time Chavan saw her. A classical song that his mother usually sang for practice, seems to dominate his memories of his mother and his own childhood.

The unit resents Chavan's attitude, but this same attitude moulds them into a formidable unit. Peter hates Chavan's approach and decides to leave. Chavan tells him that if he flees his training, he will be considered a coward in the eyes of the people and his girlfriend. This motivates Peter, and as a result, he completes the training and tops his class. During a rescue operation, he loses the use of his legs and is honourably discharged from the Army. One commando (Diganto, or 2-by-2) loses his life in the operation. Later, he writes to Chavan inviting him to his wedding.

When Chavan arrives at Peter's house in Mumbai for the wedding, he is informed by a neighbour that Peter is dead. Chavan learns many shocking truths of Peter's locality. Kiran tells him that a group of goons was extorting money from the people of the area. Peter, having taken over his father's bakery, refused to pay and challenged them. The gang killed Peter in front of the whole locality, while Peter fought like a soldier until his end. Chavan finds that not a single person, not even Peter's father, is willing to testify against them out of fear.

Chavan takes matters into his own hands and speaks to the police and the media in pursuit of justice. The police cite the need for eyewitnesses for filing a case while the media is disinterested. Chavan felt that the part of civil society became corrupted and spineless. Later when the gang harasses Kiran, Chavan vents his fury on them. He kills the goons single-handedly, avenging Peter's murder.

Chavan is arrested and tried for killing the goons. In court, Chavan is accused of abusing his powers and taking the law into his hands. An outraged Chavan fervently reminds the people present of all the hardships suffered by their forefathers and security personnel to keep them safe. He states that people have become too feeble to oppose injustice and, unless this changes, society is lost.

In the end, the judge sends him to a mental institution, keeping his military designations intact. Kiran and her son visit him there. The movie ends with a fantasy sequence of Major Chavan giving army training to hundreds of boys.

== Cast ==
- Nana Patekar as Major V. S. Chavan (Maratha Light Infantry)
- Dimple Kapadia as Kiran
- Gautam Joglekar as 2nd Lieutenant Peter D'Souza (Maratha Light Infantry)
- Habib Tanvir as Joe D'Souza, Peter's father
- Madhuri Dixit as Shirley
- Makrand Deshpande as Shirley's brother
- Sai Deodhar as Chiku, Kiran's son
- Achyut Potdar as Shirley's Father
- Shivkumar Subramaniam as 2nd Lieutenant Khandagle (Maratha Light Infantry)
- Vishwajeet Pradhan as Commando (Maratha Light Infantry)
- General Vijay Kumar Singh as Lieutenant Colonel V K Singh (cameo)
- Ragesh Asthana as Terrorist
- Jahangir Khan as Terrorist
- Cheetah Yagnesh Shetty as Local Goon
- Aadesh Shrivastava, who plays violin in the song "Dhadkan Zara Ruk Gayee Hain."

== Soundtrack ==
The music of the film was composed by Laxmikant–Pyarelal. The lyrics were written by Mangesh Kulkarni.

| No. | Title | Singers | Length |
|---|---|---|---|
| 1. | "Dhadkan Zara Ruk Gayee Hai" | Suresh Wadkar | 5:31 |
| 2. | "Hamari Hi Mutthi Mein 1" | Manna Dey | 4:36 |
| 3. | "Hamari Hi Mutthi Mein 2" | Kavita Krishnamurthy | 4:39 |
| 4. | "Hamari Hi Mutthi Mein (sad)" | Manna Dey | 2:51 |
| 5. | "Yaad Piya Ki Aaye" | Shobha Gurtu | 6:31 |
