= Ankush (1986 film) =

1986 film by N. Chandra

- Directed by: N. Chandra
- Written by: N. Chandra, Sayed Sultan
- Produced by: N. Chandra; Subhas R. Durgakar
- Starring: Nana Patekar; Madan Jain; Nisha Singh; Raja Bundela; Arjun Chakraborty
- Cinematography: H. Laxminarayan
- Edited by: N. Chandra
- Music by: Kuldeep Singh
- Release date: 21 July 1986
- Running time: 149 minutes
- Country: India
- Language: Hindi

Ankush is a 1986 Hindi action drama film starring Nana Patekar, which was written, directed, edited and co-produced by N. Chandra. Made on a modest budget of ₹12 lakh, the film grossed ₹95 lakh. It was remade in Kannada as Ravana Rajya and in Tamil as Kavithai Paada Neramillai.

== Synopsis ==
The film tells the story of four lower middle class unemployed young men in Mumbai who feel disconnected with society and are wasting their lives. Their new neighbours, a beautiful young girl Anita and her grandmother, change their perspective. The men change their attitude and are trying to blend in with the normal, honest and hard-working society of 1980s India. Anita is kidnapped, tied spread eagle to the bed and is gang raped at the hands of her employer and his four friends. However, the culprits are let off for lack of evidence and Anita commits suicide. Having lost faith in the law of the land, the men take revenge on each culprit, killing them brutally. They are later tried, with all four receiving capital punishment for doing what they thought was right all the while requesting for a stronger law that protects people, which cannot be broken ever again.

== Cast ==
- Nana Patekar as Ravindra Kelkar aka Ravi
- Nisha Singh as Anita
- Madan Jain as Shashi
- Arjun Chakraborty as Arjun
- Mahavir Shah as Arvind Gupta
- Raja Bundela as Saxena
- Dinesh Kaushik as Dave
- Rabia Amin as Manda
- Gajanan Bangera as Shashi's elder brother
- Ashalata Wabgaonkar as Anita's Grandmother
- Suhas Palshikar as Laalya
- Sathyajith as Subhlya
- Ravi Patwardhan – College Principal (Uncredited Role)
- Raj Zutshi as a gay man, who is perceived to be in love with Shashi (Uncredited Role)

== Production ==
Chandra started his career with Gulzar in 1971, and later also worked as an editor with him. Influenced by Gulzar's Mere Apne (1971) and bringing in his experiences growing up in Mumbai, Chandra wrote a story of four frustrated unemployed men who roam the streets of Mumbai. He even based the character Ravindra upon the role played by Vinod Khanna in the original. The role of Ravindra was written with leading actor of Marathi cinema, Ravindra Mahajani in mind. When Chandra couldn't afford him, Nana Patekar was eager to do the same role and signed on for Rs. 10,000.

== Soundtrack ==
| 1 | " Uparwala Kya Maangega Humse Koi Jawab" | Ashok Khosla, Ghanshyam Vaswani, Shekhar Sawkar |
| 2 | "Itani Shakti Hamen De Na Daataa" | Pushpa Pagdhare, Sushma Shreshta |
| 3 | "Aaya Maaza Dildara, Dil Hamara Na Aawara" | Ashok Khosla, Ghanshyam Vaswani, Shekhar Sawkar |

== Remakes ==
The film was remade in Tamil as Kavithai Paada Neramillai and in Kannada as Ravana Rajya.
