= Nana Patekar =

Indian actor and writer (1951–2026)

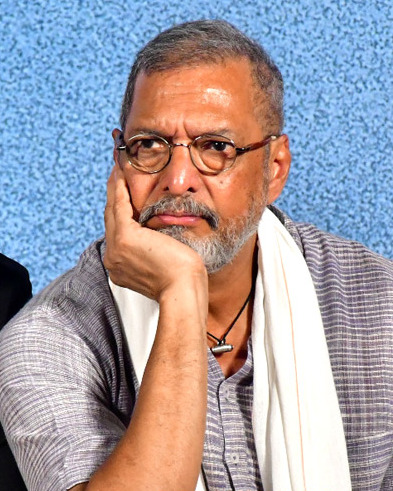
- Nana Patekar in 2025
- Born: Vishwanath Patekar; 1 January 1951; Murud-Janjira, Bombay State, India
- Died: 8 October 2026 (aged 75); Dona Paula, Goa, India
- Education: Sir J.J. Institute of Applied Arts
- Occupations: Actor; Screenwriter; Film maker; Army Officer
- Years active: 1978–2026
- Organisation: Naam Foundation
- Works: Full list
- Spouse: Neelkanti Patekar (m. 1978)
- Children: 2
- Awards: Padma Shri (2013)
- Military career
- Allegiance: India
- Branch: Indian Army
- Service years: 1990–2013
- Rank: Lieutenant Colonel (Hon.)
- Units: Territorial Army; Maratha Light Infantry
- Conflicts: Kargil War

Vishwanath "Nana" Patekar (1 January 1951 – 8 October 2026) was an Indian actor, writer, filmmaker, singer, soldier and shooter who mainly worked in Hindi and Marathi cinema. Widely regarded as one of the greatest and most influential actors in Indian Cinema, Patekar was recipient of the three National Film Awards, four Filmfare Awards, two Maharashtra State Film Awards and two Filmfare Awards Marathi for his acting performances. He was bestowed with the Padma Shri award in 2013 for his contribution to cinema and arts industry.

After making his acting debut in Bollywood with the 1978 drama Gaman, Patekar acted in a few Marathi films and some Bollywood films. After starring in the Academy Award-nominated Salaam Bombay in 1988, he won the National Film Award for Best Supporting Actor and the Filmfare Award for Best Supporting Actor for his performance in the crime drama Parinda (1989). He then starred in his directorial debut, Prahaar: The Final Attack (1991). Patekar starred in and received critical acclaim for his performance in several commercially successful films of the 1990s, including Raju Ban Gaya Gentleman (1992); Angaar (1992), for which he won the Filmfare Award for Best Villain; Tirangaa (1993) and Krantiveer (1994), for which he won the National Film Award for Best Actor and the Filmfare Award for Best Actor. Further acclaim came his way for Agni Sakshi (1996), for which he won his second National Film Award for Best Supporting Actor; and Khamoshi: The Musical (1996).

During the early 2000s, he received praise for his performances in Shakti: The Power (2002), Ab Tak Chhappan (2004) and Apaharan (2005); the latter of which earned him his second Filmfare Award for Best Villain, and Taxi No. 9211 (2006). Patekar received widespread praise for playing a good-hearted gangster Uday Shetty in the comedy Welcome (2007) and its sequel Welcome Back (2015), and a politician in the political thriller Raajneeti (2010). In 2016, he starred in the critically and commercially successful Marathi film Natsamrat, in which he portrayed a retired stage actor. He won the Filmfare Award for Best Actor for his performance in the film.

== Early life ==
Nana Patekar was born as Vishwanath Patekar, into a Marathi family in Murud-Janjira, in the present-day Raigad District, Maharashtra. He was an alumnus of the Sir J.J. Institute of Applied Art, Mumbai.

== Career ==
=== Early character roles (1978–1988) ===
Patekar made his debut with Gaman (1978), then did Maficha Sakshidar (Marathi 1986), after which he did several small roles in Marathi cinema. He portrayed Nathuram Godse in the British television series Lord Mountbatten: The Last Viceroy (1986). He also played notable roles in Aaj Ki Awaz (1984), Ankush (1986), Pratighaat (1987), Andha Yudh (1987), Mohre (1988), Trishagni (1988), Awam (1987) and Sagar Sangam (1988). His performance in Andha Yudh earned him his first nomination for the Filmfare Award for Best Supporting Actor.

=== Acclaimed actor (1989–2010) ===
During this period, his performance in Mira Nair's Salaam Bombay! (1988) earned him high praise. He also received widespread critical acclaim for his portrayal of a crime lord in the crime drama Parinda (1989), which earned him his first National Film Award for Best Supporting Actor and his first Filmfare Award for Best Supporting Actor.

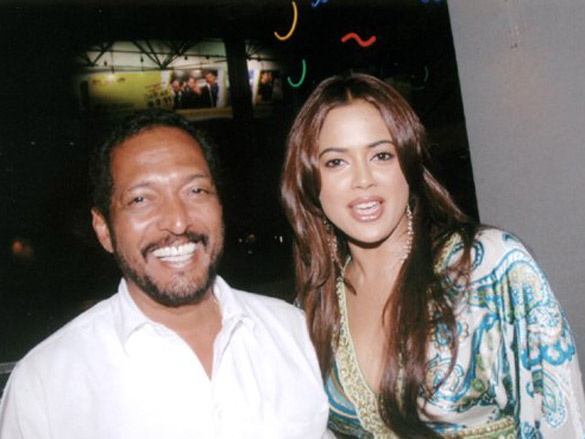
Patekar and Sameera Reddy at the premiere of Taxi No. 9211 in 2006.

Patekar then turned director for his film Prahaar: The Final Attack (1991), co-starring Dimple Kapadia and Madhuri Dixit, for which he underwent training for his role as an Indian Army officer. His role in Angaar (1992) earned him his first Filmfare Award for Best Villain. He co-starred alongside Shah Rukh Khan, Juhi Chawla and Amrita Singh in the romantic comedy Raju Ban Gaya Gentleman (1992) and alongside industry veteran Raaj Kumar in Tirangaa (1993), both of which earned him two consecutive nominations for the Filmfare Award for Best Supporting Actor. He played a truant, gambling son in Krantiveer (1994), for which he won the National Film Award for Best Actor, the Filmfare Award for Best Actor and the Screen Award for Best Actor. Patekar portrayed a ghost in the children's film Abhay (1994), post which he co-starred with Rishi Kapoor in Hum Dono (1995). He played a sadist husband in Agni Sakshi (1996), which earned him his second National Film Award for Best Supporting Actor, a deaf father to Manisha Koirala in Khamoshi: The Musical (1996), both of which earned him two nominations for the Filmfare Award for Best Actor, a gangster in Ghulam-E-Mustafa (1997), an honest, but maverick cop in Yeshwant (1997) and a schizophrenic in Wajood (1998). He co-starred with Amitabh Bachchan in Kohram (1999), where he played an undercover Indian Army intelligence officer chasing Bachchan's incognito. His other notable films of this decade were Yugpurush (1998) and Hu Tu Tu (1999).

He starred with Aditya Pancholi as the CBI director in the crime drama Tarkieb (2000). After a hiatus of a year he returned to acting in Shakti: The Power (2002) in which he played an extremely violent father, which earned him his second nomination for the Filmfare Award for Best Villain. In Ab Tak Chhappan (2004), he played a police officer who is an encounter specialist. His performance in Apaharan (2005) earned him his second Filmfare Award for Best Villain as well as the Screen Award for Best Villain. He played a taxi driver in Taxi No. 9211 (2006) opposite John Abraham. The film was a box office success, and both Patekar and Abraham were praised for their chemistry.

2007 was successful for Patekar. He starred in several comic roles, one being his highly praised performance in Welcome with Anil Kapoor, which saw him portray a powerful crime lord in Dubai who once desired to be an actor in films. He later acted in Sangeeth Sivan's film Ek (2009).

In 2010, he portrayed a school headmaster in Paathshaala (2010). He also starred in Prakash Jha's multi-starrer political drama Raajneeti (2010), which earned him his fifth nomination for the Filmfare Award for Best Supporting Actor.

=== Regional films and occasional mainstream work (2011–2026) ===
In 2011, he starred in the critically acclaimed Shagird and the Marathi film Deool. His next film was Ram Gopal Verma's The Attacks of 26/11 (2013) based on the events of the 2008 Mumbai Attacks in which he played Joint Commissioner of Police Rakesh Maria. In 2014, he starred in another Marathi film Dr. Prakash Baba Amte – The Real Hero. In 2015, he made two sequels reprising his roles in Ab Tak Chhappan 2, sequel of Ab Tak Chhappan and Welcome Back, the sequel of Welcome, pairing with Anil Kapoor again. While Ab Tak Chhappan 2 was not commercially successful, Welcome Back was a success.

In 2016, he starred as Ganpatrao "Appa" Belwalkar in the film adaptation of the drama Natsamrat which was a major critical and commercial success. He earned two Filmfare Awards for Best Actor – Marathi for Dr. Prakash Baba Amte – The Real Hero and Natsamrat. He lent his voice for Shere Khan in the Hindi version of The Jungle Book (2016). He played a supporting role in the Tamil language action film Kaala (2018), starring Rajnikanth. It was moderately successful at the box office.

After appearing in low budget films like It's My Life (2020) and Tadka (2022), in 2023, Patekar headlined Vivek Agnihotri directed The Vaccine War, which tells about the development of Covaxin during the COVID-19 pandemic in India. The film was a commercial and critical failure but Patekar's performance received high praise as Renuka Vyavahare of The Times of India wrote "Nana Patekar is outstanding but the film reduces itself to being a government mouthpiece parading as a medical drama."

Patekar played a supporting role in the ensemble comedy thriller Housefull 5. The film opened to poor reception, with Lachmi Deb Roy of Firstpost, publishing a negative review, but praising Patekar's "jolly good" role as one of the film's few redeeming qualities.

At the time of his death, Patekar had been working on the upcoming crime thriller The Confession of Mary (also known as The Confession); co-producer Subhash Kale said that Patekar was expected to return to Mumbai to complete the dubbing for the film, with one line of dubbing remaining.

=== Singing career ===
Patekar did some playback singing in the films Yeshwant (1997), Wajood (1998) and Aanch (2003). He also worked with Aarav H. Kondhiya in many notable works.

=== Shooting career ===
Nana Patekar was also a national-level rifle shooter who was awarded multiple medals. His passion for shooting began in his late 40s, when he underwent military training for his 1991 movie Prahaar. He began competing in around 2001 in the 300m big bore and the 50m rifle prone events. In the National Shooting Championships, he won the Silver Medal in the 300 metres big bore event as an individual in 2004 in Indore and the bronze medal as part of the Maharashtra team, scoring 549 out of 600 and ranked 12th individually, in 2007 at Mhow.The National Shooting Federation gave him the 'Renowned Shot' title. He also supported other athletes and sponsored Olympian Anjali Bhagwat's first air rifle.

=== Army Stint ===
Patekar joined the Territorial Army as a captain in 1988. He underwent a three-months training to prepare for the movie Prahaar, and worked with General V. K. Singh, who was a lieutenant colonel at that time and had a cameo appearance. During the Kargil War in 1999, Patekar served in the Maratha Light Infantry regiment as a major. He retired from the Territorial Army in 2013 as a lieutenant colonel.

== Personal life ==
Patekar married Neelkanti in 1978, and together they had two sons; one, Durvasa, died aged 2, due to illness. Patekar's father died of a heart attack when Patekar was 28. Patekar had two brothers.

He was a chain smoker until he quit at the age of 56. In an interview, he said that his father loved plays and encouraged him to watch them, developing Patekar's love for acting. Vijaya Mehta directed his first play. Patekar remained close with his mother, Nirmala Patekar, who lived with him, until her death on 29 January 2019 at the age of 99.

He was separated from his wife. As per an unsubstantiated story published on an entertainment news portal he had romantic relationships with Manisha Koirala and Ayesha Jhulka.

Patekar lived in Andheri, Mumbai, in a 1BHK apartment.

Tanushree Dutta allegation

In 2018, actress Tanushree Dutta alleged that Patekar behaved inappropriately with her during the 2008 shoot of the film Horn 'Ok' Pleassss. Patekar denied the allegations. In June 2019, Mumbai Police filed a "B Summary" closure report before a magistrate court, stating that they had found no evidence to prosecute. Dutta opposed the report and filed a protest petition seeking a further investigation.

In March 2025, a magistrate court in Mumbai declined to take cognisance of the complaint, ruling that it had been filed beyond the limitation period and that no explanation for the delay had been provided. The court did not examine the police report on its merits. Dutta has said she continues to stand by her allegations.

Following Patekar's death on 8 October 2026, Dutta initially said on Instagram that she would share her reaction once she had decided what it should be; the remarks drew criticism, including from the All Indian Cine Workers Association. In later remarks, Dutta said she doubted the authenticity of the reports of his death.

=== Death ===
In the early hours of 8 October 2026, Patekar experienced severe chest pains at his home in Goa. A medical team was then dispatched to his home, where he was found unconscious. After CPR was administered, he was taken to the Manipal Hospital in Goa, where he was declared dead at 5:20 a.m. due to cardiac arrest. He was 75. He was cremated in with full state honours at his farmhouse in Donje village near Pune, Maharashtra.

== Philanthropy ==
Patekar was known for his philanthropy. He contributed money towards rebuilding of the flood ravaged villages in Bihar through the charitable organisation Anubhuthi. All the monetary remuneration he obtained for his performance in the movie Paathshaala was donated by him to five different charitable organisations. When he was awarded the Raj Kapoor award, which carries a cash prize of Rs 1,000,000, he donated the entire amount towards drought relief activities in Maharashtra. He also provided financial aid to families of farmers who committed suicide due to indebtedness brought about by drought. He distributed cheques worth Rs 15,000 to 62 families of farmers from Vidarbha region in August 2015, and another 113 families from Latur and Dharashiv districts of Marathwada in September 2015.

In September 2015, Patekar established the Naam Foundation, with fellow Marathi actor Makarand Anaspure, which works to provide aid to farmers overcome by drought conditions in Maharashtra.

Using a Twitter campaign with the hashtag #IcareIsupport, Patekar was able to obtain funds to help Maharashtra drought victims.

== Awards and recognition ==
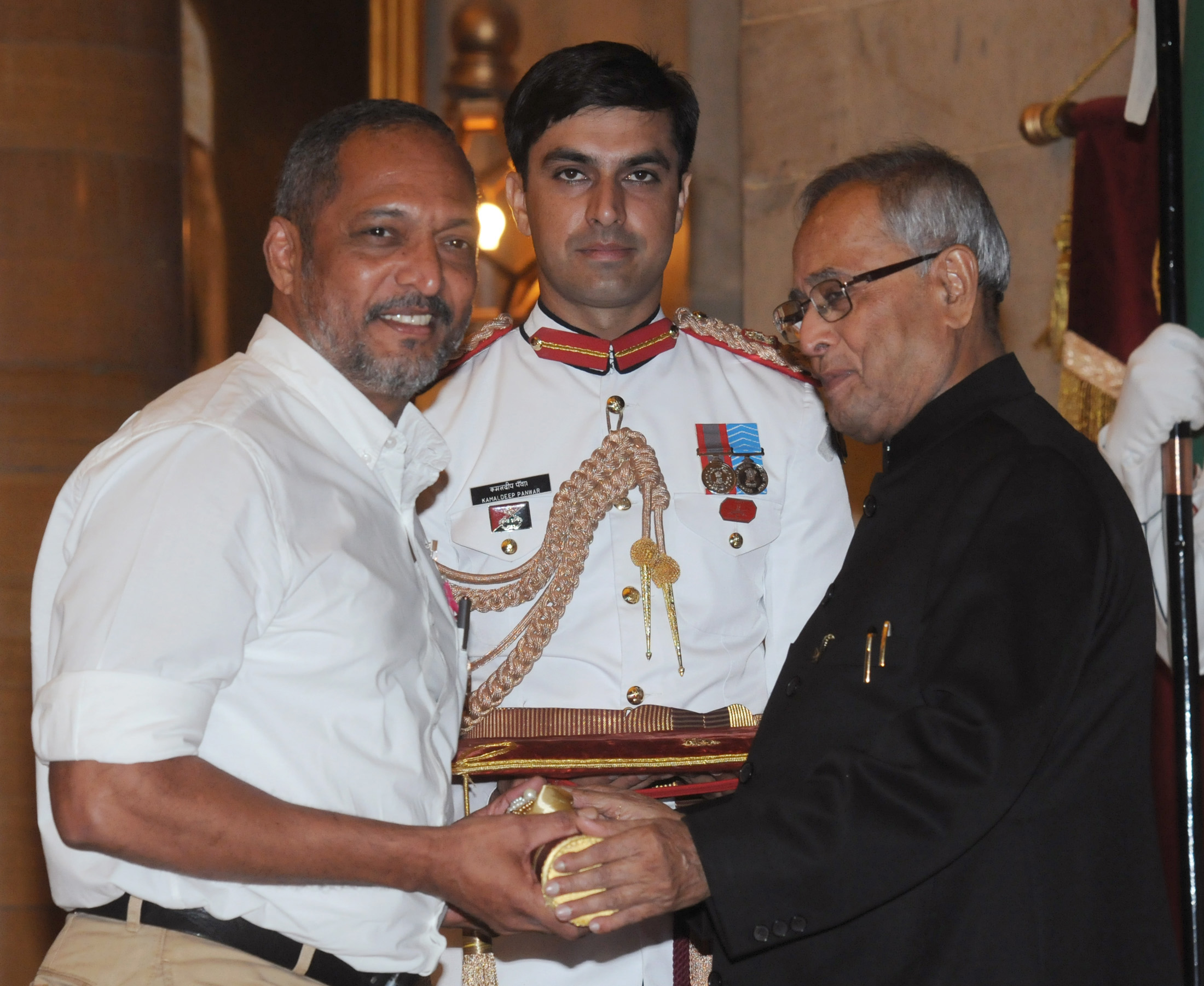
The President, Pranab Mukherjee presenting the Padma Shri Award to Patekar, at an Investiture Ceremony, at Rashtrapati Bhavan, in New Delhi on 20 April 2013

- Patekar was given the Padma Shri award for his dedication in the field of Films and Arts in 2013 on the eve of the 64th Republic Day.
- Patekar was given the Raj Kapoor Special Contribution Award in 2013 by the Government of Maharashtra.
- Patekar, along with Irrfan Khan, was among the only actors ever to win Filmfare Awards in the Best Actor, Best Supporting Actor and Best Villain categories.

Year	Award	Film	Status
National Film Awards
1989	Best Supporting Actor	Parinda	Won
1995	Best Actor	Krantiveer	Won
1997	Best Supporting Actor	Agni Sakshi	Won
Filmfare Awards
1989	Best Supporting Actor	Andha Yudh	Nominated
1990	Best Supporting Actor	Parinda	Won
1992	Best Story	Prahaar: The Final Attack	Nominated
1993	Best Villain	Angaar	Won
1993	Best Supporting Actor	Raju Ban Gaya Gentleman	Nominated
1994	Best Supporting Actor	Tirangaa	Nominated
1995	Best Actor	Krantiveer	Won
1997	Best Actor	Agni Sakshi	Nominated
1997	Best Actor	Khamoshi: The Musical	Nominated
2003	Best Villain	Shakti: The Power	Nominated
2006	Best Villain	Apaharan	Won
2011	Best Supporting Actor	Raajneeti	Nominated
Star Screen Awards
1995	Best Actor	Krantiveer	Won
2006	Best Villain	Apaharan	Won
Maharashtra State Film Awards
1983	Best Actor	Raghu Maina	Won
1986	Best Actor	Gad Jejuri Jejuri	Won
Filmfare Marathi Awards
2015	Best Actor	Dr. Prakash Baba Amte – The Real Hero	Won
2017	Best Actor	Natsamrat	Won
2025	Best Actor	Ole Aale	Nominated
International Indian Film Academy Awards
2005	Best Actor	Ab Tak Chhappan	Nominated
2006	Best Performance in a Negative Role	Apaharan	Won
2006	Best Performance in a Negative Role	Bluffmaster!	Nominated
Bengal Film Journalists' Association Awards
1993	Best Supporting Actor (Hindi)	Angaar	Won
2005	Best Actor (Hindi)	Ab Tak Chhappan	Won
Zee Cine Awards
2003	Best Villain	Shakti: The Power	Nominated
2006	Best Villain	Apaharan	Won
2008	Best Actor in a Comic Role	Welcome	Nominated
2011	Best Actor in a Supporting Role	Raajneeti	Nominated
2017	Best Actor (Marathi)	Natsamrat	Won
Producers Guild Film Awards
2006	Best Actor in a Supporting Role	Apaharan	Nominated
2009	Best Actor in a Comic Role	Welcome	Nominated
Bollywood Movie Awards
2018	Best Villain	Apaharan	Nominated
Ananda Vikatan Cinema Awards
2018	Best Villain – Male	Kaala	Won
Annual Central European Bollywood Awards
2006	Best Supporting Actor	Apaharan	Nominated
2007	Best Actor	Taxi No. 9211	Nominated
2008	Best Supporting Actor	Welcome	Nominated
2011	Best Supporting Actor	Raajneeti	Nominated
