= Madhuri Dixit filmography =

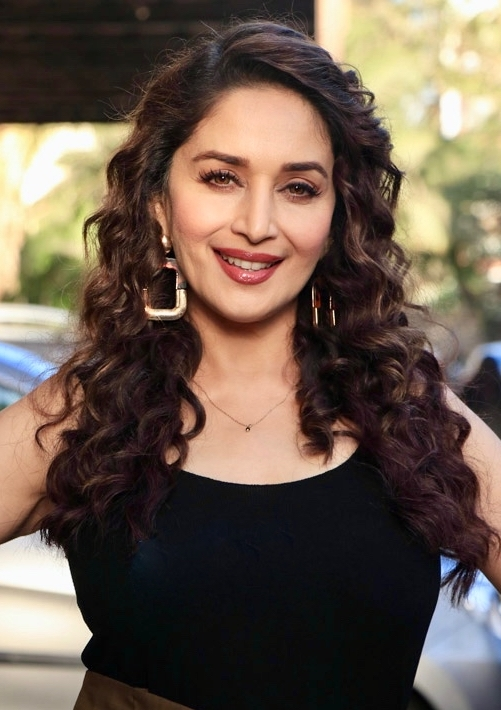
Dixit in 2019

Indian actress Madhuri Dixit made her acting debut in 1984 with Abodh where she portrayed a young bride. Dixit went on to appear in several films over the next three years, including the dramas Awara Baap (1985) and Swati (1986), though none of them garnered her much recognition. The role of Mohini in N. Chandra's action romance drama Tezaab (1988) proved to be a breakthrough for Dixit. The film went on to become the highest-grossing film of that year. For her performance, Dixit received a Best Actress nomination at Filmfare. She achieved further success by featuring as the female lead in several top-grossing action-dramas, including Ram Lakhan (1989) opposite Anil Kapoor, Tridev (1989) opposite Sunny Deol, and Kishen Kanhaiya (1990) opposite Anil Kapoor. The role of a wealthy brat in the 1990 romantic drama Dil earned Dixit her first Filmfare Award for Best Actress. The following year, she starred in another box-office hit Saajan, and won her second Best Actress award at Filmfare for portraying the role of a strong woman who rebels against her manipulative mother-in-law in the 1992 drama Beta.

She featured alongside Jackie Shroff and Sanjay Dutt in the action thriller Khalnayak (1993), one of the highest-grossing films of that year. Subsequently, she played an avenger in the drama Anjaam (1994) to positive reviews. Dixit's subsequent release was Sooraj Barjatya's Hum Aapke Hain Koun..! (1994), a family drama which emerged as the highest-grossing Bollywood film to that point. The following year, she featured in Raja (1995) which was a blockbuster film of that year and Yaraana in which she played a woman who attempts an escape from her abusive husband. Both of her releases in 1996—Rajkumar and Prem Granth—were financial failures. Dixit's portrayal of a headstrong dancer in Yash Chopra's 1997 romance Dil To Pagal Hai was a major success, earning her a fourth Filmfare Award for Best Actress. She garnered critical acclaim for her work in the dramas Mrityudand (1997), Wajood (1998) and Pukar (2000). She portrayed five roles in the experimental film Gaja Gamini (2000).

Dixit was praised for her supporting role as a woman fighting against gender discrimination in Lajja (2001), a drama on women's rights, which performed poorly at the box-office. The year 2002 saw Dixit starring in two romantic dramas, including Devdas opposite Shah Rukh Khan, in which she played the role of Chandramukhi, a courtesan in love with an alcoholic. For the film, she won a Filmfare Award in the Best Supporting Actress category. After a five-year absence from the screen, Dixit played a leading role in Anil Mehta's dance film Aaja Nachle (2007). Despite the film's failure at the box-office, her performance was praised. The widely praised role of a con woman Begum Para in Abhishek Chaubey's black comedy film Dedh Ishqiya (2014) marked her first acting role in seven years; she received her 14th Best Actress nomination at Filmfare for it. She followed it by playing the leader of a vigilante group in the action crime drama film Gulaab Gang. Her highest-grossing release came with the adventure comedy Total Dhamaal (2019) and the horror comedy movie Bhool Bhulaiyaa 3 (2024), the latter of which ranks among the highest-grossing Indian films of all time. On television, Dixit has served as a talent judge for the dance reality shows Jhalak Dikhhla Jaa (2010–2014, 2022) and Dance Deewane (2018–2021).

== Films ==
Key
| † | Denotes films that have not yet been released |

| Year | Title (Note: The films are listed in order of release date.) | Role(s) | Notes | Ref(s) |
|---|---|---|---|---|
| 1984 | Abodh | Gauri | | |
| 1985 | Awara Baap | Barkha | | |
| 1986 | Swati | Anandi | | |
| 1987 | Hifazat | Janki | | |
| 1987 | Uttar Dakshin | Chanda | | |
| 1987 | Mohre | Maya | | |
| 1988 | Khatron Ke Khiladi | Kavita | | |
| 1988 | Dayavan | Neelu Shakti | | |
| 1988 | Tezaab | Mohini | Nominated—Filmfare Award for Best Actress | |
| 1989 | Vardi | Jaya | | |
| 1989 | Ram Lakhan | Radha Shastri | | |
| 1989 | Prem Pratigyaa | Laxmi Rao | Nominated—Filmfare Award for Best Actress | |
| 1989 | Ilaaka | Vidya | | |
| 1989 | Mujrim | Sonia | | |
| 1989 | Tridev | Divya Mathur | | |
| 1989 | Kanoon Apna Apna | Bharathi | | |
| 1989 | Parinda | Paro | | |
| 1989 | Paap Ka Ant | Nisha | | |
| 1990 | Maha-Sangram | Jhumri | | |
| 1990 | Kishen Kanhaiya | Anju | | |
| 1990 | Izzatdaar | Mohini | | |
| 1990 | Dil | Madhu Mehra | Filmfare Award for Best Actress | |
| 1990 | Deewana Mujh Sa Nahin | Anita | | |
| 1990 | Jeevan Ek Sanghursh | Madhu Sen | | |
| 1990 | Sailaab | Dr. Sushma Malhotra | | |
| 1990 | Jamai Raja | Rekha | | |
| 1990 | Thanedaar | Chanda | | |
| 1991 | Pyar Ka Devta | Radha | | |
| 1991 | Khilaaf | Shweta | | |
| 1991 | 100 Days | Devi | | |
| 1991 | Pratikar | Madhu | | |
| 1991 | Saajan | Pooja | Nominated—Filmfare Award for Best Actress | |
| 1991 | Prahaar | Shirley | | |
| 1992 | Beta | Saraswati | Filmfare Award for Best Actress | |
| 1992 | Zindagi Ek Jua | Juhi | | |
| 1992 | Prem Deewane | Shivangi Mehra | | |
| 1992 | Khel | Seema, Jhari Bhuti | | |
| 1992 | Sangeet | Sangeeta, Nirmala | | |
| 1992 | Dharavi | Dreamgirl | | |
| 1993 | Sahibaan | Sahibaan | | |
| 1993 | Khalnayak | Ganga Gangotri Devi | Nominated—Filmfare Award for Best Actress | |
| 1993 | Phool | Guddi | | |
| 1993 | Dil Tera Aashiq | Savitri Devi, Sonia Khanna | | |
| 1993 | Aasoo Bane Angaarey | Usha, Madhu | | |
| 1994 | Anjaam | Shivani Dixit Chopra | Nominated—Filmfare Award for Best Actress | |
| 1994 | Hum Aapke Hain Koun..! | Nisha Choudhury | Filmfare Award for Best Actress | |
| 1995 | Raja | Madhu Garhwal | Nominated—Filmfare Award for Best Actress | |
| 1995 | Yaraana | Lalita/Shikha | Nominated—Filmfare Award for Best Actress | |
| 1995 | Paappi Devataa | Reshma | | |
| 1995 | Daughters of This Century | – | | |
| 1996 | Prem Granth | Kajri | | |
| 1996 | Rajkumar | Rajkumari Vishaka | | |
| 1997 | Koyla | Gauri | | |
| 1997 | Mahaanta | Jenny Pinto | | |
| 1997 | Mrityudand | Ketki | | |
| 1997 | Mohabbat | Shweta Sharma | | |
| 1997 | Dil To Pagal Hai | Pooja Nair | Filmfare Award for Best Actress | |
| 1998 | Bade Miyan Chote Miyan | Herself | Special appearance | |
| 1998 | Wajood | Apoorva Choudhury | | |
| 1999 | Aarzoo | Pooja | | |
| 2000 | Pukar | Anjali | Nominated—Filmfare Award for Best Actress | |
| 2000 | Gaja Gamini | Gaja Gamini, Sangita, Shakuntala, Monika, Mona Lisa | | |
| 2001 | Yeh Raaste Hain Pyaar Ke | Neha | | |
| 2001 | Lajja | Janaki | Nominated—Filmfare Award for Best Supporting Actress | |
| 2002 | Hum Tumhare Hain Sanam | Radha | | |
| 2002 | Devdas | Chandramukhi | Filmfare Award for Best Supporting Actress; Also playback singer for song "Kaahe Chhed" | |
| 2007 | Aaja Nachle | Dia | Nominated—Filmfare Award for Best Actress; Also playback singer for song "Soniye Mil Ja" | |
| 2013 | Bombay Talkies | Herself | Special appearance in the song "Apna Bombay Talkies" | |
| 2013 | Yeh Jawaani Hai Deewani | Mohini | Special appearance in the song "Ghagra" | |
| 2014 | Dedh Ishqiya | Begum Para | Nominated—Filmfare Award for Best Actress | |
| 2014 | Gulaab Gang | Rajjo | Also playback singer for the song "Rangi Saari Gulaabi" | |
| 2018 | Bucket List | Madhura Sane | Marathi film | |
| 2018 | Mowgli: Legend of the Jungle | Nisha | Voiceover in Hindi dubbed version | |
| 2019 | Total Dhamaal | Bindu Patel | | |
| 2019 | 15 August | – | Producer | |
| 2019 | Kalank | Bahaar Begum | Nominated—Filmfare Award for Best Supporting Actress | |
| 2022 | Maja Ma | Pallavi Patel | | |
| 2023 | Panchak | – | Producer | |
| 2024 | Bhool Bhulaiyaa 3 | Mandira, Anjulika | | |
| 2026 | Maa Behen | Rekha | Netflix film | |

== Television ==
| Year | Title | Role | Notes | Ref. |
|---|---|---|---|---|
| 1985 | Paying Guest | Neena | 1 episode | |
| 2002 | Kahin Na Kahin Koi Hai | Host | | |
| 2010–2022 | Jhalak Dikhhla Jaa | Judge | Season 4–7,10 | |
| 2011 | Food Food Maha Challenge | Host | Season 1 | |
| 2016 | So You Think You Can Dance | Judge | Season 1 | |
| 2018–present | Dance Deewane | Judge | Season 1–present | |
| 2022 | The Fame Game | Anamika Anand | Main role | |
| 2025 | Mrs. Deshpande | Seema Deshpande/Zeenat Fatima | Lead Role | |
| 2026 | Kon Honar Crorepati | Host | Season 8 | |

== See also ==
- List of awards and nominations received by Madhuri Dixit
