= List of awards and nominations received by Madhuri Dixit =

Madhuri Dixit awards and nominations
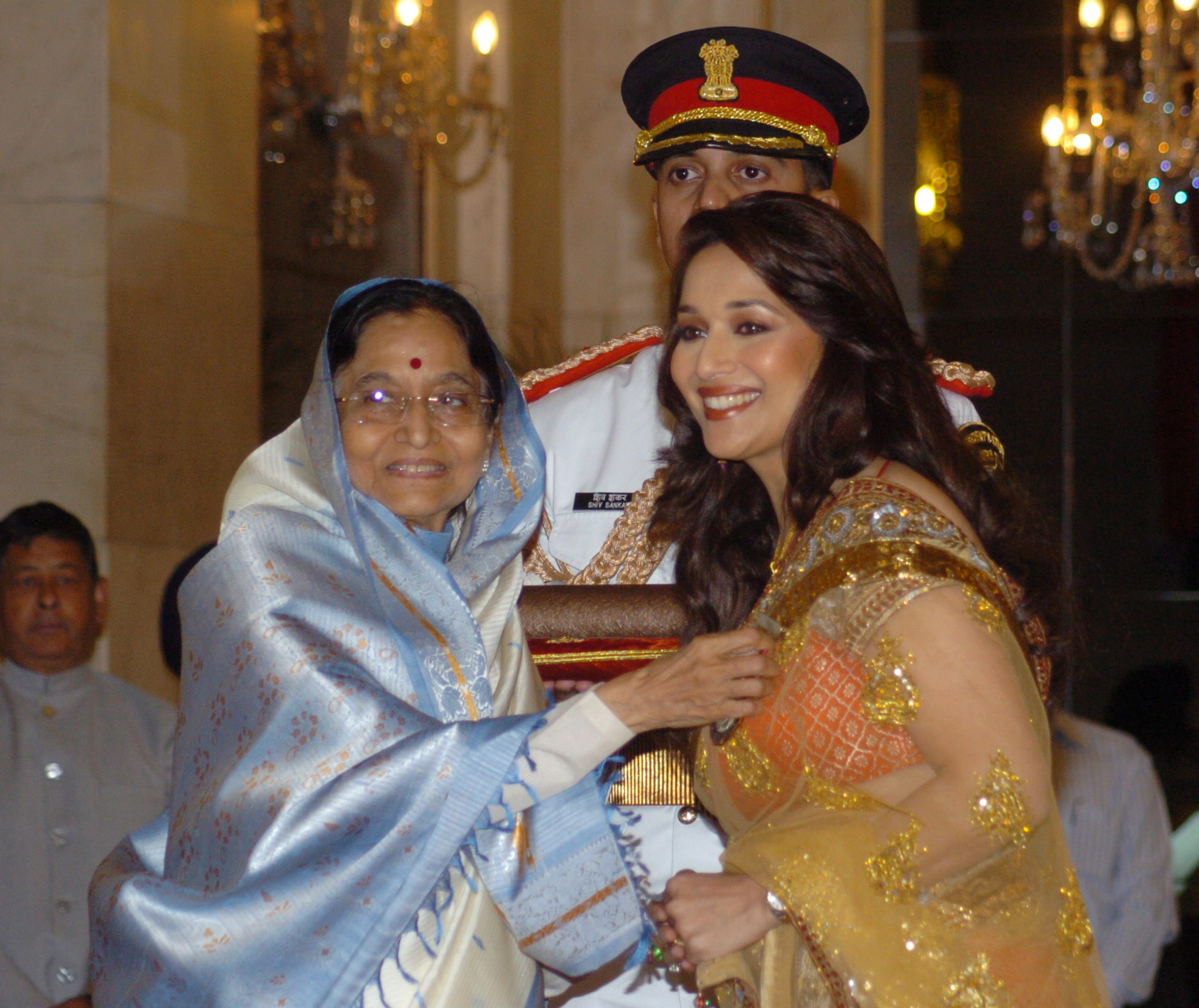
- Dixit receiving the Padma Shri from President Pratibha Patil in 2008
Awards and nominations
Award	Wins	Nominations
Filmfare Awards	6	17
IIFA Awards	0	2
Screen Awards	4	7
Stardust Awards	0	2
Zee Cine Awards	2	4
Giants International Award	1	1
Indian Film Festival of Los Angeles	1	1
India's Top Movie Stars	1	1
International Film Festival of India	1	1
Kalabhinetri Awards	1	1
Master Deenanath Mangeshkar Vishesh Award	1	1
National Citizen Award	1	1
Padma Shri	1	1
Platinum Diva Award	1	1
Raj Kapoor Special Contribution Award	1	1
Smita Patil Memorial Award	1	1
Star Foundation Network Award	1	1
Vogue Beauty Awards	1	1
Sahyog Foundation Aashirwad Awards	1	1

Totals (Note: Certain award groups do not simply award one winner. They acknowledge several different recipients, have runners-up, and have third place. Since this is a specific recognition and is different from losing an award, runner-up mentions are considered wins in this award tally. For simplification and to avoid errors, each award in this list has been presumed to have had a prior nomination.)
- Wins: 54
- Nominations: 62

Madhuri Dixit (born 15 May 1967) is an Indian actress, dancer, television personality, film producer and musical artist who appears in Bollywood films. She made her acting debut in Abodh (1984). Though the film failed commercially, Dixit continued acting in films and attained commercial success with Tezaab in 1988. The film earned her a Best Actress nomination at the 34th Filmfare Awards. Dixit starred in the 1990 romantic drama Dil, the biggest hit of the year and it won her a Filmfare Award for Best Actress.

She starred in a string of commercial successes and portrayed a variety of characters — the fan of a poet in Saajan (1991), a defiant daughter-in-law in Beta (1992), a determined police woman in Khalnayak (1993) and an avenging widow in Anjaam (1994)—all of them earning her nominations at the Filmfare awards, and winning her second trophy for Beta. Hum Aapke Hain Koun..! earned her a third Filmfare Award for Best Actress, as well as Screen Award for Best Actress.

Raja and Yaraana—both earned her Filmfare nominations and Screen Award wins. The following year, she was honoured with the Kalabhinetri award by the Government of Andhra Pradesh, as well as the Smita Patil Memorial Award, for her contribution to the film industry. In 1997, Dixit starred in the box-office blockbuster Dil To Pagal Hai, which earned her another Filmfare Award for Best Actress and a Zee Cine Award. In the 2000s, she starred in Pukar (2000), Lajja (2001) and Devdas (2002), all of them earned her Filmfare nominations, the latter earning a Filmfare Award for Best Supporting Actress. In 2003, she took a hiatus from acting and moved to Colorado.

Dixit returned to film acting with Aaja Nachle (2007) and then starred in Dedh Ishqiya (2014) both earning her nominations for the Filmfare Award for Best Actress. In 2008, she was honoured with the Padma Shri, India's fourth highest civilian award, by the Government of India. Dixit is considered one of the most popular and influential female stars of the Indian film industry and was listed by Forbes magazine in 2001 as the top-five highest paid Hindi film actors, till then. Dixit has also received achievement awards from a number of organizations; a Filmfare Special Award for completing 25 years in the Indian film industry and other recognitions including the Master Deenanath Mangeshkar Vishesh Award, the Platinum Diva Award, Raj Kapoor Special Contribution Award and the Vogue Beauty Awards for her contributions to art and cinema.

== Filmfare Awards ==
The Filmfare Awards are presented annually by The Times Group and Filmfare magazine to honour both artistic and technical excellence of professionals in the Hindi language film industry of India. The Filmfare ceremony is one of the oldest and most prominent film events given for Hindi films in India. Dixit has received seventeen nominations in the Filmfare Awards and has won six awards, including four in the Best Actress category and one in the Best Supporting Actress category. In 2011, Dixit was awarded the Filmfare Special Award for completing twenty-five years in the Indian film industry.

Competitive awards
Year	Category	Nominated work	Result
1989	Best Actress	Tezaab	Nominated
1990	Best Actress	Prem Pratigyaa	Nominated
1991	Best Actress	Dil	Won
1992	Best Actress	Saajan	Nominated
1993	Best Actress	Beta	Won
1994	Best Actress	Khalnayak	Nominated
1995	Best Actress	Anjaam	Nominated
1995	Best Actress	Hum Aapke Hain Koun..!	Won
1996	Best Actress	Raja	Nominated
1996	Best Actress	Yaraana	Nominated
1998	Best Actress	Dil To Pagal Hai	Won
2001	Best Actress	Pukar	Nominated
2002	Best Supporting Actress	Lajja	Nominated
2003	Best Supporting Actress	Devdas	Won
2008	Best Actress	Aaja Nachle	Nominated
2015	Best Actress	Dedh Ishqiya	Nominated
2020	Best Supporting Actress	Kalank	Nominated
2025	Best Supporting Actress	Bhool Bhulaiyaa 3	Nominated

Honorary award
Year	Category	Result
2011	Filmfare Special Award (For completing 25 years in the Indian film industry.)	Honored

FILMFARE OTT AWARDS
Year	Category	Result
2022	Filmfare Best Actor (Female) (The Fame Game)	Nominated

== International Indian Film Academy Awards ==
The International Indian Film Academy Awards (IIFA Awards) are presented annually by the International Indian Film Academy to honour both artistic and technical excellence of professionals in Bollywood, the Hindi language film industry. Dixit has received two nominations in the Best Actress category.

Year	Category	Nominated work	Result
2001	Best Actress	Pukar	Nominated
2003	Best Actress	Devdas	Nominated

== Sansui Viewer's Choice Awards ==
The Sansui Viewer's Choice Awards was an annual awards ceremony presented to the Bollywood film industry, which were boycotted by Shah Rukh Khan in 2005, now no longer held. Dixit has won two awards.

Year	Category	Nominated work	Result
1997	Best Actor – Female	Dil To Pagal Hai	Won
1998	Best Actor – Female	Mrityudand	Won

== Screen Awards ==
The Screen Awards is the only award ceremony in India to be involved with the executive director and the Governor of the Academy of Motion Picture Arts and Sciences (AMPAS). They are presented annually to honor professional excellence in the Hindi language film industry of India. Dixit has won three awards out of four nominations in the Best Actress category and one award in the Best Supporting Actress category. Overall, Dixit has won four awards out of seven nominations.

Year	Category	Nominated work	Result
1995	Best Actress	Hum Aapke Hain Koun..!	Won
1996	Best Actress	Raja	Won
1998	Best Actress	Mrityudand	Won
2001	Best Actress	Pukar	Nominated
2003	Best Supporting Actress	Devdas	Won
2015	Best Actress in a Negative Role	Dedh Ishqiya	Nominated
2020	Best Comedian	Total Dhamaal	Nominated

== Stardust Awards ==
The Stardust Awards is an award ceremony presented annually by Stardust magazine, honoring the best films, actors and technical categories of the year for Bollywood. In 2008, Dixit received a nomination in the Star of the Year – Female category.

Year	Category	Nominated work	Result
2008	Star of the Year – Female	Aaja Nachle	Nominated
2014	Best Actress in a Drama	Dedh Ishqiya	Nominated

== Zee Cine Awards ==
The Zee Cine Awards is an award ceremony for the Hindi film industry, where the awards are chosen by votes from the viewers. Dixit has received four nominations including three nominations in the Best Actor – Female category and one nomination in the Best Actor in a Supporting Role – Female category.

Year	Category	Nominated work	Result
1998	Best Actor – Female	Dil To Pagal Hai	Won
2000	Best Actor – Female	Pukar	Nominated
2002	Best Actor in a Supporting Role – Female	Lajja	Won
2025	Best Actor in a Supporting Role – Female	Bhool Bhulaiyaa 3	Won
2003	Best Actor – Female	Devdas	Nominated

== Giants International Awards ==
The Giants International Awards are given on 17 September of each year to recognize the achievements in various fields like Medicine, Selfless service to the poor, Excellence in art and cultural activities etc. In 2011, Dixit was given the Giants International Award.

Year	Category	Nominated work	Result
2011	Giants International Award	Cinematic Achievement	Won

== India's Top Movie Stars ==
In 2001, Forbes magazine listed out the top five most powerful Indian film stars, where Dixit was given the fifth rank. The power rankings in Forbes were based on a proprietary formula weighing salary, number of press clips returned on computer research service LexisNexis, and by gauging popularity from searches on Dow Jones Interactive and Google.com.

Year	Category	Nominated work	Result
2001	Forbes India's Top Movie Stars	Overall Contribution	Won

== International Film Festival of India ==
The International Film Festival of India (IFFI), founded in 1952, is one of the most significant film festivals in Asia and is held annually in the beach town of Goa, in the western coast of India. At the 42nd ceremony in 2011, Dixit was honored with a memento during the inauguration ceremony.

At the closing ceremony of 52nd Edition of the International Film Festival of India (IFFI) felicitating the Guest of Honor actor Madhuri Dixit Nene for her outstanding performances in Bollywood movies.

Year	Category	Nominated work	Result
2011	International Film Festival of India Special Memento	Overall contribution	Won
2021	International Film Festival of India	Outstanding Performances in Movies	Won
2023	54th International Film Festival of India	Special Recognition for Contribution to Bharatiya Cinema	Won

== Indian Film Festival of Los Angeles (IIFLA) ==
In 2008, the Indian Film Festival of Los Angeles (IFFLA) paid a tribute to Dixit, by screening of her films Mrityudand and Dil To Pagal Hai.

Year	Category	Nominated work	Result
2008	IFFLA Tribute	Dil To Pagal Hai and Mrityudand	Won

== Indian Academy Awards ==
Felicitated with the Certificate of Special Appreciation as Superstar Madhuri Dixit at Bay Area, Silicon Valley, California in Press Meeting of Indian Academy Awards 2017.

Year	Nominated work	Award	Result
2017	Overall Contribution	Certificate of Appreciation as Superstar Madhuri Dixit	Won

== Lokmat Maharashtrian Of The Year Awards ==
Year	Award	Nominated work	Result
2018	Best Actress	Bucket List	Nominated

== Lux Golden Rose Awards ==
Year	Award	Nominated work	Result
2017	Timeless Beauty	—N/a	Won
2018	Charismatic Beauty Of The Year	Bucket List	Won

== Master Deenanath Mangeshkar Vishesh Awards ==
The Deenanath Vishesh Awards are presented each year in memory of Indian singer Lata Mangeshkar's late father, Master Deenanath Mangeshkar. In 2012, Dixit was honoured with the Vishesh Award for her contribution to Indian Cinema; the award presented by Mangeshkar herself.

Year	Category	Nominated work	Result
2012	Master Dinanath Mangeshkar Vishesh Award	Overall Contribution	Won

== National Citizen Awards ==
The National Citizen Award was introduced in 1987, to honor and recognize excellence in various activities affecting the nation of India. In 2001, Dixit was honored with the National Citizen Award for contribution to Indian cinema.

Year	Category	Nominated work	Result
2001	National Citizen Award	Overall Contribution	Won

== Platinum Diva Award ==
The Platinum Diva Award is presented at Planman Media's Power Brands Hall of Fame awards. The awards constitute of a gamut of the most powerful brands of India, chosen by the Indian consumer through a pan Indian research, conducted by the Indian Council of Market Research. In 2012, Dixit was awarded the Platinum Diva Award in recognition of her brilliance in the field of acting.

Year	Category	Nominated work	Result
2012	Platinum Diva Award	Overall Contribution	Won

== Raj Kapoor Special Contribution Award ==
The Raj Kapoor Special Contribution Award is given by the Government of Maharashtra for "Incomparable contribution made to the Hindi cinema". In 2012, Dixit was honoured with the award, which constituted of a cash prize of ₹200,000, a citation and a memento.

Year	Category	Nominated work	Result
2012	Raj Kapoor Special Contribution Award	Overall Contribution	Won

== Smita Patil Memorial Awards ==
The Smita Patil Memorial Award is a biennial award, introduced in 1985 by Priyadarshni Academy to recognise an actress' contribution to the film industry. In 1996, Dixit was honored with the Smita Patil Memorial Award at the Priyadarshni Academy's 12th Anniversary Global Awards Function on 19 September 1996.

Year	Category	Nominated work	Result
1996	Smita Patil Memorial Award	Overall Contribution	Won

== Star Foundation Network Awards ==
The Star Foundation Network is a charitable organisation that provides people an opportunity to buy a star in the sky and gift it to anyone they want. In 2012, The Network honored Dixit by naming a star in the Orion constellation named after her. The award was initiated by Dixit's fan website, who made the effort and co-ordinated with the Star Foundation to get her the honor.

Year	Category	Nominated work	Result
2012	Star Foundation Celestial Star	Overall Contribution	Won

== Vogue Beauty Awards ==
In 2011, Dixit was honored by Vogue magazine, with the Bollywood Beauty Legend Award at the Vogue Beauty Awards.

Year	Category	Nominated work	Result
2011	Vogue Bollywood Beauty Legend Award	Overall Contribution	Won

== Sahyog Foundation Aashirwad Awards ==
In 1989, Madhuri Dixit felicitated with "Ashirwad Award" which presents by Sahyog Foundation for her outstanding performances for the movies Ram Lakhan and Tezaab. Dixit became the "Star of the Year (Female)" in 1989 and felicitated with the "Aashirwad Award" during 12th Aashirwaad Awards Nite on Thursday 21 September 1989 at Sanmukhananda Hall, Mumbai.

Year	Category	Nominated work	Result
1989	Star of the Year (Female) for Outstanding Performance	Ram Lakhan and Tezaab	Won

== Colors Golden Petal Awards ==
In 2012, Bollywood's Dhak Dhak girl Madhuri Dixit Nene added another accolade to her growing list of awards as she was named The Best Non-Fiction TV Judge for the latest season of Jhalak Dikhhla Jaa at the Golden Petal Awards 2012.

In 2013, Dhak Dhak girl added again as The Best Non-Fiction TV Judge Award for Jhalak Dikhhla Jaa in Colors Golden Petal Awards 2013.

Year	Category	Nominated Work	Result
2012	Best Non-Fiction TV Judge	Jhalak Dikhhla Jaa as Judge	Won
2013	Best Non-Fiction TV Judge	Jhalak Dikhhla Jaa as Judge	Won

== Indian Digital Media Awards ==
The Dancing Diva has also another award to her credit too. Her mobile application titled Madhuri Dixit has won the Silver Award at Indian Digital Media Awards 2013, under the mobile/tablets app category.Her app has been featured in the top five most downloaded apps on iOs in the Indian App store.

Year	Nominated work	Award	Result
2013	Five Most Downloaded Apps	Silver Award	Won

== Radio City Cine Awards Marathi ==
Natasamrat, Nana Patekar, Dancing diva, Madhuri Dixit Nene won the Best Actor and Best Actress respectively.Radio City by crowning the winners of the most endeared award of the year, City Cine Awards Marathi, Season 2. Amidst a glittery award night in Pune, attended by the stars and technicians of the Marathi film fraternity, Radio City applauded and awarded the winners across 12 categories with a grand trophy.

Year	Category	Nominated Work	Result
2018	Best Actress	Bucket List	Won

== Civilian Awards ==
- 2008 – Padma Shri, India's fourth highest civilian award from the Government of India

== Special honours ==
- 1997 – Kalabhinetri Award by the Government of Andhra Pradesh
- 1999 – Honored as a Chief Guest and also for her outstanding contribution to Indian Cinema with Sahyog Foundation Award
- 2001 – Young Achiever's Award at Indo-American Society
- 2008 – She was given a tribute at the Indian Film Festival in Los Angeles.
- 2011 – Wave Silver Screen Queen Honour at Pearls Wave Awards
- 2012 – Timeless Icon Award at the HELLO! Hall of Fame Awards
- 2013 – Lacchu Maharaj Award
- 2013 – Honoured the Most Inspirational Female Bollywood Icon at Bradford Inspirational Women Awards (BIWA)
- 2013 – Outstanding Contribution to the Entertainment Industry at the CNBC-TV18 India Business Leader Awards
- 2014 – Mirchi Queen of Hearts at The Royal Stag Mirchi Music Awards
- 2015 – Madhuri Dixit honored as a Marathi Taraka in Marathi Taraka Awards at 500.
- 2015 – Diva Madhuri Dixit honored with an award for the great achievements and as an inspiration in her field as she was present at the Set Beautiful Free launch of rehabilitation initiative of rescued girls by NGO One Foundation.
- 2015 – Honoured by Marrakech Film Festival for Contribution to the Entertainment Industry
- 2015 – Inspiring Icon of India from Sathyabama University
- 2015 – Timeless Glamour and Style Icon (Female) at the Filmfare Glamour & Style Awards
- 2016 – Felicitated with the 'Icon of India' Award at Asiavision Awards
- 2016 – Honored with the 'Idol of God' as a 'Chief Guest' at the book launch of Veteran Actress Nutan.
- 2018 – Mrs India at Femina Miss India
- 2019 – Influential Cinema Personality at Majha Sanman Puruskar
- 2019 – Honored with Global Excellence Awards as a Chief Guest in the 2nd Edition of Global Excellence Awards 2019.

== Media Honours ==
- 1993 – In 1993 Madhuri Dixit achieved No.1 position in a survey "Who is your favorite heroine" by a "Movie" magazine.
- 1995 – In 1995 Madhuri Dixit wins the Movie Magazine Poll by No.1 position in "The Best Performance (Female) of 1994 was"
- 1997 – In 1997 a survey done by Times of India found Dixit as "The Idol for all young woman"
- 2000 – Madhuri Dixit voted as the "Actress of Millenium" in 2000.
- 2000 – In Millenium Edition 2000, the Guinness World Records book featured her as the highest paid Indian actress.
- 2001 – Forbes placed her at fifth position in the list of "top five most powerful Indian film stars".
- 2002 – In 2002 Madhuri Dixit featured in Rediff's annual "Top Bollywood's Actresses" listing.
- 2003 – In 2003 Madhuri Dixit ruling by getting 1st position in ZeeNews "Best of India" poll.
- 2004 – In 2004 Madhuri Dixit featured in Rediff's list of "Bollywood's Most Beautiful Actresses"
- 2007 – In 2007 Madhuri Dixit voted No.1 as the "Best Bollywood Actress Ever" in a poll conducted by BBC.
- 2007 – On Women's International Day, Dixit ranked No.1 position RediffRediff's list of the Best Bollywood Actresses Ever.
- 2007 – Madhuri Dixit featured in "Top 10 Actresses who ruled the Bollywood" industry and holds 6th position in the list conducted by Bollywood Entertainment Australia.
- 2007 – In 2007 the UK magazine Eastern Eye ranked her as one of "World's Sexiest Asian Women" and holds 2nd position.
- 2009 – In 2009 Madhuri Dixit won the survey of "Best Bollywood Actress Ever" which is created by "Pinkvilla.com"
- 2010 – The Economic Times featured her in the list of 33 women who made India proud.
- 2011 – In 2011 Dixit voted as the most desirable Bollywood actress of 2011 in a poll conducted by HindiFilmNews.Com
- 2011 – Rediff.com listed her in the top 10 Readers Choice: The Greatest Actresses of all time.
- 2012 – Madhuri Dixit holds 2nd position in the list of "Top 25 Most Beautiful Indian Actresses" survey done by IMDb.
- 2012 – Madhuri Dixit holds 4th position jointly with Kajol in NDTV's mid-term poll of "Top 5 Greatest Actresses of all time".
- 2012 – Madhuri Dixit won the list by getting No.1 position in the list of "10 Iconic and Eternal Beauties of Bollywood" on the occasion of celebrating 100 years of Indian Cinema which is done by yahoo.com.
- 2012 – Madhuri Dixit ranked at the first position by NDTV poll in 2012, in the listing of "The most popular Bollywood actresses of all time" during celebration of Indian Cinema completes 100 glorious years.
- 2013 - Madhuri Dixit came out on top as "The Best Bollywood Actress" ever in the list of "Superstars of Bollywood: 100 years of Indian Cinema" the list generated by The Times of India.
- 2013 − In 2013 Madhuri Dixit voted No.1 "The Greatest Actor (Female) in 100 years of Indian cinema" in a poll conducted by History TV.
- 2013 – Madhuri Dixit ranked No.1 position during the survey of Rediff's "Top 10 Bollywood Actresses Of All Time" on the occasion of celebration of 100 years of Indian Cinema.
- 2013 – Ranked No.1 position in the survey among Bollywood's actresses and was placed fourth in the overall list in a UK poll celebrating 100 years of Indian cinema '100 Greatest Bollywood Stars' published by British Asian weekly newspaper 'Eastern Eye'.
- 2013 – Madhuri Dixit at No.1 in the list of "Top 100 all time Best Actresses of Bollywood" in the survey done by IMDb in 2013.
- 2013 – In a poll conducted by Filmfare celebrating 100 years of Indian Cinema, Madhuri Dixit stands second position behind Aishwarya Rai, as "Most Popular Actress in 100 years".
- 2013 – In a poll conducted by CNN-IBN on the occasion of the centenary of Indian cinema, Dixit was voted at the second position, behind Sridevi, as "India's Greatest Actress in 100 Years".
- 2013 – In 2013, Madhuri Dixit wins highest score for having the "Best Smile" of all in Bollywood, in a Yahoo poll.
- 2017 – In 2017, Dixit holds 1st position an India Today poll as "The Most popular actress of Hindi cinema till date".
- 2019 – Ranked no.3 among Actor (female) India's Most Trusted Personality by TRA Research.
- 2019 – In 2019, Madhuri Dixit and Anil Kapoor emerged as the Best Jodi at the "#BLBESTof3" poll by beating other strong bollywood contenders and got 33% votes.
- 2020 – Topped the list amongst the female personalities as India's Most Trusted Personality by TRA research, overall ranked no.6.
- 2020 – Madhuri Dixit featured in the list of "First Women of Indian Cinema: 7 Women Who Scripted History with Their Cinematic Achievements" by Yahoo.
- 2021 – Madhuri Dixit topped the list as "The Eternal Beauties of Bollywood" in the list of "Most Beautiful Actresses of Bollywood" by Zee5.
- 2022 – Madhuri Dixit got honoured by winning 1st position in "Bollywood Best Dancer: Top 10 Best Dancers in Bollywood of All Time"
- 2022 – Madhuri Dixit got honoured by holding 5th position and only one Indian Actress in "Top 10 Hottest Female Dancers in the World" and the survey done by Trendrr.
- 2022 – Madhuri Dixit got honored by getting 8th position in the list of "Top 10 Famous & Best Dancer In The World Of All Time" by ADM Desk.
