= Dinanath =

Dinanath or Deenanath is a name. People with the name include:

- Dinanath Bhargava
- Dinanath Sen
- Dinanath Bhaskar
- Dinanath Dalal
- Dinanath Ramnarine
- Dinanath Pandey
- Dinanath Pathy
- Dinanath Puthenchery
- Dinanath Kushwaha
- Dinanath Batra
- Dinanath Nadim
- Dinanath Gopal Tendulkar
- Dinanath Singh Yadav
- Dinanath Mishra
- Dinanath Batra
- Dinanath Dalal
- Dinanath Pathy
- Dinanath Atmaram Dalvi
- Deenanath Sewak
- Dinanath Puthenchery
- Narayan Dinanath Velkar
- Lata Dinanath Mangeshkar
- Ashalata Dinanath Mangeshkar

== See also ==
- Deenanath Mangeshkar Hospital
- Lata Mangeshkar Award (section Master Deenanath Mangeshkar Smriti Pratishthan)
- List of awards and nominations received by Madhuri Dixit (section Master Deenanath Mangeshkar Vishesh Awards)
- Deenanath grass
