= Madhuri Dixit =

Indian actress and host (born 1967)

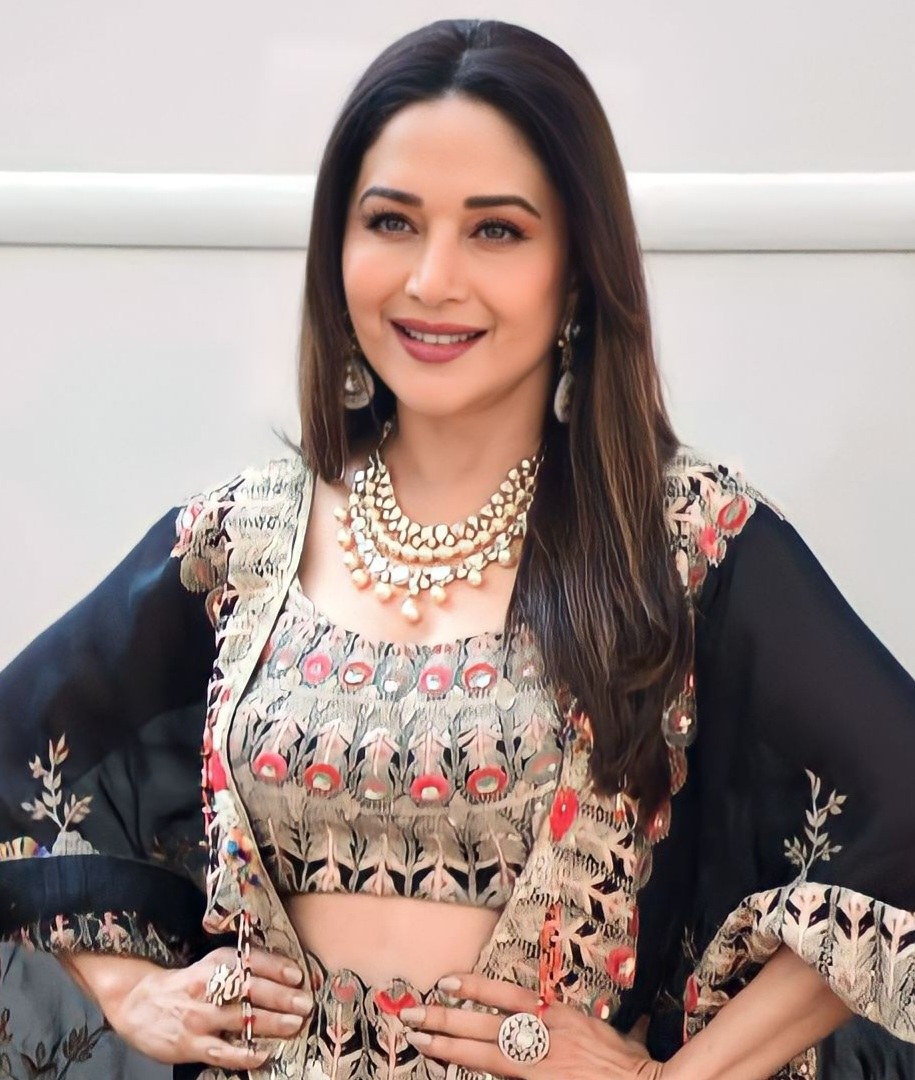
- Dixit in 2022
- Born: 15 May 1967 (age 59); Bombay, Maharashtra, India
- Other name: Madhuri Dixit Nene
- Occupations: Actress; television personality
- Years active: 1984–present
- Works: Full list
- Spouse: Shriram Madhav Nene (m. 1999)
- Children: 2
- Awards: Full list
- Honours: Padma Shri (2008)

Signature
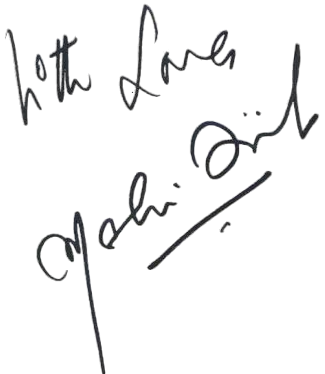

Madhuri Dixit Nene (née Dixit, pronounced [d̪iːkʂɪt̪]; born 15 May 1967) is an Indian actress and television personality. She has appeared in over 70 Hindi films, attaining nationwide stardom that influenced Indian popular culture. Noted by critics for her performances and dancing abilities, Dixit was credited for singularly paralleling her male contemporaries by leading star vehicles in a male-dominated industry. Her accolades include six Filmfare Awards from a record 17 nominations. In 2008, the Government of India awarded her with Padma Shri, the fourth-highest civilian honour of the country.

Born and raised in Mumbai, Dixit made her acting debut in 1984 with a leading role in the drama Abodh. After a few successive commercially failed films, she rose to prominence with the action drama Tezaab (1988), and established herself with starring roles in the top-grossing romantic dramas Dil (1990), Beta (1992), Hum Aapke Hain Koun..! (1994), and Dil To Pagal Hai (1997). She won four Filmfare Awards for Best Actress for her performances in them. Other commercially successful films during this period include Ram Lakhan, Tridev (both 1989), Thanedaar, Kishen Kanhaiya (both 1990), Saajan (1991), Khalnayak (1993), and Raja (1995).

Apart from Dixit's mainstream success, she earned appreciation from critics for her performances in Prem Pratigyaa, Parinda (both 1989), Anjaam (1994), Mrityudand (1997), Pukar (2000), and Lajja (2001). She received the Filmfare Award for Best Supporting Actress for playing Chandramukhi in Devdas (2002). Following a hiatus, Dixit made a brief comeback by starring in the musical Aaja Nachle (2007), and acted intermittently over the next decades. During this period, she primarily featured as a talent judge for dance reality shows, such as Jhalak Dikhhla Jaa (2010–2022) and Dance Deewane (since 2018). She continued to gain praise for starring in the black comedy Dedh Ishqiya (2014) and the Netflix drama series The Fame Game (2022), and had her highest-grossing releases in the comedies Total Dhamaal (2019) and Bhool Bhulaiyaa 3 (2024).

Dixit was among the country's highest-paid celebrities throughout the 1990s and early 2000s, and has featured in Forbes India's Celebrity 100 list since its inception in 2012. In addition to acting, she has been engaged in philanthropic activities. She has worked with UNICEF since 2014 to advocate the rights of children and prevent child labour, participates in concert tours and stage shows, and is the co-founder of the production company RnM Moving Pictures. Since 1999, she has been married to Shriram Nene, with whom she has two sons.

== Early life and background ==
Madhuri Dixit was born on 15 May 1967 into a Marathi Chitpavan Brahmin family in Bombay to Shankar and Snehlata Dixit. She has two elder sisters and an elder brother. She kindled an interest in dance at an early age of three, and went on to train in Kathak for eight years; later on becoming a professionally trained Kathak dancer.

I received a scholarship as a Kathak dancer when I was nine. I even remember that it was due to a dance performance that the first time my name had appeared in the paper. I was seven or eight years old at that time and had performed at the Guru Purnima festival. And there was a journalist who was there and he had written this article saying that 'this little girl stole the show' – something like that. I was over the moon. So dance gave me a sense of achievement. Of worth."

Dixit received her education at Divine Child High School in Andheri. Apart from her studies, she participated in extra-curricular activities, such as dramatics. Aspiring to become a microbiologist, Dixit enrolled at the Sathaye college in Vile Parle (Mumbai) where she studied microbiology as one of her subjects in BSc. However, six months after she had commenced her course, Dixit decided to discontinue studies and pursue a full-time career in films.

== Acting career ==
=== 1980s: Early roles and breakthrough ===
Dixit made her debut in film in 1984 with Rajshri Productions' drama Abodh, opposite Bengali actor, Tapas Paul. The film failed commercially but Dixit's performance earned her positive reviews from critics. Aakash Barvalia of Gomolo wrote, "Madhuri excels in her role as a young bride who acquits herself well as the naive village girl and does not realise what marriage actually entails." Her only release of 1985 – Awara Baap – flopped at the box office. During this time, a monochrome photograph of hers, shot by Gautam Rajadhyaksha was featured on the cover of the then-popular magazine Debonair and she appeared as the cover girl of Filmfare in April 1986.

Dixit's next four releases were the dramas Swati (1986), Manav Hatya (1986), Hifazat (1987) and Uttar Dakshin (1987). All films were critical and commercial failures. Hifazat marked Dixit's first of several collaborations with Anil Kapoor. In 1988, Dixit had film releases; two of them —Mohre, and Khatron Ke Khiladi —were commercial failures.

In 1988, Dixit acted in Dayavan, which was a commercially successful film. Her next release of the year was N. Chandra's action drama Tezaab, opposite Anil Kapoor. Dixit performance as Mohini, an impoverished and miserable woman compelled to perform dances in order to earn money for her father, earned her mainstream recognition. Tezaab went on to become the highest-grossing film of the year and Dixit received her first Filmfare Award for Best Actress nomination. The film's success established Dixit as a leading actress of Hindi cinema and marked a significant point in her career. Akshay Shah of Planet Bollywood wrote, "Madhuri Dixit also gives a fine tuned performance. Though she is more remembered for her crowd pleasing dance act 'Ek Do Teen', her acting needs to be noted, specially in the scenes where she is pitted against Anupam Kher."

Her first release of 1989, Vardi, did fairly well at the box office. She next re-united with Anil Kapoor for Subhash Ghai's Ram Lakhan. She played Radha Shastri, a girl who falls in love with her childhood friend, but finds it hard to convince her father. Ram Lakhan was the second highest-grossing Hindi-language film of the year. Dixit's next release was the romantic drama Prem Pratigyaa, opposite Mithun Chakraborty. Her portrayal of Laxmi Rao, a distraught woman who reforms a local underworld don, earned her a second nomination for the Filmfare Award for Best Actress. Madhuri Dixit was cast opposite Sunny Deol in Trimurti Films' multi-cast thriller film Tridev. It finished up as one of the biggest hits and the third highest-grossing film of the year.

Her next release of the year, Vidhu Vinod Chopra's drama Parinda, co-starring Anil Kapoor, Jackie Shroff and Nana Patekar was another box office hit. She played Paro, a schoolteacher who is killed on her wedding night along with Karan (played by Kapoor) by a gangster (played by Patekar). A major critical success, the film was included in News18's 2013 list of the "100 greatest Indian films of all time". It was selected as the official Indian submission for the 1990 Academy Award for Best Foreign Language Film but was not nominated. Rediff.com opined that Dixit added "touching vulnerability and soft focus appeal to the heavy duty proceedings". Also that year, after Prem Pratigyaa she starred in Ilaaka, Mujrim (both opposite Mithun Chakraborty) and all three were hits. Other films such as Paap Ka Ant (opposite Govinda) and Kanoon Apna Apna (opposite Sanjay Dutt) was an average grosser.

=== 1990s: Established actress ===
In 1990, Dixit appeared in nine films. Five of them—Maha-Sangram, Deewana Mujh Sa Nahin, Jeevan Ek Sanghursh, Sailaab and Jamai Raja—were commercially unsuccessful. Her next release that year was Rakesh Roshan's action comedy Kishen Kanhaiya (alongside Anil Kapoor and Shilpa Shirodkar). It tells the story of twin brothers who are separated at birth and re-unite in their youth. Dixit and Shirodkar played the love interests of Kapoor's characters. It was the fourth-highest-grossing film of the year in India. Dixit next played a strong-willed woman in the box-office average action drama Izzatdaar. She won her first Filmfare Award for Best Actress for portraying Madhu, a rich and arrogant girl who falls in love with a poorer boy, in Indra Kumar's romantic drama Dil opposite Aamir Khan. It emerged as the highest-grossing film of the year. Rediff.com hailed her performance, commenting "..she showed her range as a performer. She breathed fire as the rebellious lover defying her family, or the forlorn estranged wife longing to be with her ailing better half." Dixit's final release of the year was the action drama Thanedaar, opposite Dutt, which was another commercial hit.

In 1991, Dixit had five film releases, the first of which was the romance Pyar Ka Devta. She next starred alongside Jackie Shroff in the psychological thriller 100 Days. She played Devi, a clairvoyant woman who has a vision of a murder and sets out to uncover the truth. The film was a moderately successful. She next starred in Saajan opposite Dutt and Salman Khan. A major critical and commercial success, the film earned Dixit praise for her portrayal of Pooja Saxena, who is in love with her idol – Sagar. She received her fourth Best Actress nomination at Filmfare for her work in the film. T. Rama Rao's Pratikar and Nana Patekar's Prahaar were her other releases.

In 1992, Dixit starred in Sudhir Mishra's Dharavi starring Om Puri, Shabana Azmi and Anil Kapoor. Dixit appears in the film as part of the lead character's (played by Puri) escapist dreams, portraying the fictional version of herself. The film was a joint NFDC-Doordarshan production and went on to win the National Film Award for Best Feature Film in Hindi. Dixit's next release of the year was Kumar's drama Beta, co-starring Anil Kapoor and Aruna Irani. Dixit's portrayal of Saraswati, an educated woman who rebels against her manipulative mother-in-law, earned her critical acclaim. Sukanya Verma mentioned that Dixit delivered "a powerhouse performance against an equally lethal looking Irani, even as Kapoor was overshadowed between the ladies." The film finished up as the biggest hit of the year and won her a second Filmfare Award for Best Actress. Following the film's success, Dixit became famously known as the "Dhak Dhak Girl". Zindagi Ek Juaa, Prem Deewane, Khel and Sangeet were her other releases of the year.

In 1993, Dixit appeared in Ramesh Talwar's Sahibaan which was commercially successful. Dixit next reunited with Sanjay Dutt and Jackie Shroff in Subhash Ghai's crime drama Khalnayak. Her portrayal of Ganga, a police officer, who volunteers to go undercover, to trap an escaped criminal, garnered her critical acclaim. India Today wrote, "..she grinds and thrusts in her trademark dhak dhak style. The whistles grow deafening when she stares into the camera, looks at every man in the dark, and promises him her heart-and much more. In one Bangalore theatre, the police were kept on stand-by in case the crowds went berserk." Dixit's performance in Khalnayak earned her a sixth nomination for the Filmfare Award for Best Actress and became the second highest-grossing film of the year in India. Singeetam Srinivasa Rao's Phool and Lawrence D'Souza's Dil Tera Aashiq were her other releases of the year.

In 1994, Dixit starred in Rahul Rawail's psychological thriller Anjaam, which marked her first of many collaborations with Shah Rukh Khan. Dixit's portrayal of Shivani Chopra, a revenge-seeking wife and mother earned her a seventh nomination for the Filmfare Award for Best Actress. The film performed moderately well at the box office. Her next release was Rajshri Productions' family drama Hum Aapke Hain Koun..! opposite Salman Khan. The film emerged as one of the biggest hits of Hindi cinema and made ₹ 1.35 billion worldwide, breaking the record of the film Sholay (1975). It became the highest-grossing Hindi film after its theatrical run and held the record for 7 years. Dixit played Nisha, a witty and charming personality who falls in love with her sister's brother-in-law Prem (Khan), but their plans to be together are put in jeopardy when Nisha's sister dies, fetched her a third Filmfare Award for Best Actress and her first Screen Award for Best Actress. Critics believed the film to be "too sweet" but appreciated Dixit's performance. Tripat Narayanan of New Straits Times wrote "The Madhuri magic looms large throughout the film. As she emotes through dance, you simply cannot take your eyes off her." In a retrospect review, Rediff wrote, "Madhuri's Nisha was stunning, enthused, plucky and irresistible." Film critic K Hariharan noted, "She is seducing every person on screen, but does it in ways that are so graceful, there is a good balance between profanity and the sacred." The film won two National Film Awards, including the Best Popular Film Providing Wholesome Entertainment and in the Millennium Edition of the "Guinness Book of World Records", Hum Aapke Hain Koun became Bollywood's highest-grossing film.

Dixit achieved further success when she reunited with Indra Kumar for the romantic drama Raja opposite Sanjay Kapoor. She portrayed Madhu, a rich girl who falls for her childhood friend (played by Kapoor), however, she finds it tough to convince her two brothers of this relationship. It emerged as the third highest-grossing film of the year and its success was attributed to Dixit's immense popularity. She won a second Screen Award for Best Actress for her performance. Her next release was David Dhawan's Yaraana opposite Rishi Kapoor, in which she played Lalita, a dancer on the run from her abusive lover. The film underperformed at the box office. Both the films earned her nominations for the Filmfare Award for Best Actress.

The following year, both her films Prem Granth and Rajkumar flopped at the box office. In 1997, Dixit received critical acclaim for her portrayal of Ketki Singh, a village woman who struggles to confront and defeat the forces of oppression and male domination in Prakash Jha's Mrityudand alongside Shabana Azmi and Shilpa Shirodkar. In a review for India Today, Anupama Chopra wrote, " Dixit gives her career's best performance. Simply dressed, she looks stunning and acts even better. She is by turns romantic, vulnerable, angry – the perfect foil to Azmi's long-suffering 'badi bahu'." Screen magazine deemed her portrayal "fiery" and appreciated the lack of glamour in the part. For her performance, Dixit won a third Screen Award for Best Actress. She next starred in the dramas Koyla, Mahaanta and Mohabbat. With the exception of Koyla, none of these films performed well either critically or commercially.

Dixit's fifth and final release of 1997 was Yash Chopra's musical romantic drama Dil To Pagal Hai. Co-starring Shah Rukh Khan, Karisma Kapoor and Akshay Kumar, the film depicts the love stories of the dancers in a musical dance troupe. Her role of Pooja, a woman faced with a moral dilemma in a love quadrangle fetched her a fourth Filmfare Award for Best Actress and the Zee Cine Award for Best Actor – Female. Dil To Pagal Hai emerged as a blockbuster at the box office and emerged as the highest-grossing film of the year in India. At the 45th National Film Awards, the film won three awards, including the Best Popular Film Providing Wholesome Entertainment.

She next starred in the N.Chandra-directed drama Wajood (1998) opposite Nana Patekar and Mukul Dev. She played Apoorva, a very rich girl who is misunderstood by Malhar, played by Patekar. Suparn Verma of Rediff commented: "..She nevertheless shows that even a weak role cannot stifle her as she animates the screen like only she can. Truly, the coming together of Nana, Madhuri and Chandra in one film is a tour de force." The same year, she appeared in a cameo role in the comedy Bade Miyan Chote Miyan, once again playing herself onscreen after Dharavi. Her next and only release of 1999 was the romance Aarzoo (1999) opposite Akshay Kumar and Saif Ali Khan. Upon release, the film emerged commercially unsuccessful.

=== 2000s: Career slowdown and hiatus ===
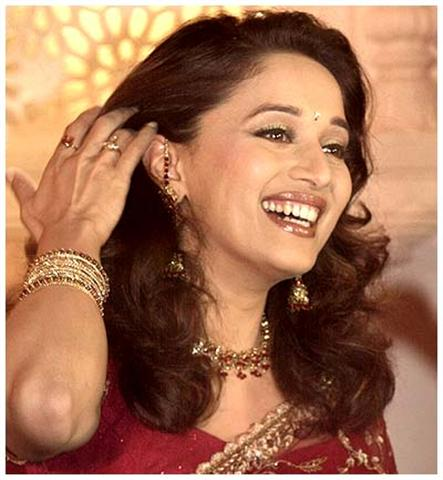
Dixit at a press meet for Yeh Raaste Hain Pyaar Ke in 2001

In 2000, Dixit starred in Rajkumar Santoshi's Pukar opposite Anil Kapoor. A love story based on the backdrop of the Indian Army, the film was shot over a course of 350 days. Dixit's portrayal of Anjali, a heartbroken and jealous woman who swears revenge on Jai (played by Kapoor) for rejecting her, garnered her several Best Actress nominations at various award ceremonies, including Filmfare and Screen. A review in Filmfare said that both "Anil Kapoor and Madhuri, veterans in their field, outdo themselves in the film". It won two National Film Awards, including the Nargis Dutt Award for Best Feature Film on National Integration. She then played the title character in Gaja Gamini, the first feature film directed by painter M. F. Husain. Hussain got fixated with Dixit, and watched her movie Hum Aapke Hain Koun..! several times, and was certain that he would make a film only with her. The film followed the story of Gaja Gamini, who appears in various incarnations as Mona Lisa, Shakuntala and others. Pukar was an average grosser, while the latter underperformed at the box office.

In 2001, Dixit starred in Deepak Shivdasani's love triangle Yeh Raaste Hain Pyaar Ke opposite Ajay Devgan and Preity Zinta. Upon release, the film met with largely negative reviews. Critic Gautam Buragohain, however, described her as "the saving grace of the film", adding that "she gives a delightful performance". Commercially too, the film failed to do well. Subsequently, Dixit reunited with Rajkumar Santoshi for the social drama Lajja (2001). Dealing with the issue of gender inequality, Dixit played Janki, a theatre actress who gets pre-maritally pregnant. Anita Bora of Rediff.com wrote: "Madhuri slips into her role as Janaki..with consummate ease..and..dazzles us with a class act." The film was a box-office failure in India but was an overseas success. Dixit's performance fetched her a Filmfare Award for Best Supporting Actress nomination and won her the Zee Cine Award for Best Actor in a Supporting Role – Female.

Dixit's first release of 2002 was the love triangle Hum Tumhare Hain Sanam opposite Shah Rukh Khan and Salman Khan, where she played Radha whose married life blemishes when she gets obsessed with the career of her friend. A remake of director K. S. Adhiyaman's own Tamil film Thotta Chinungi (1995), the film took six years in making, with huge sabbaticals in between shoots due to several production problems. The film emerged moderately successful at the Indian box office. Few critics noted that the delay made the film look outdated.

Dixit's next release was Sanjay Leela Bhansali's period romantic drama Devdas, co-starring Shah Rukh Khan and Aishwarya Rai. It was based on Sharat Chandra Chattopadhyay's novel of the same name. She portrayed Chandramukhi, a courtesan who is in love with the title character. Sita Menon of Rediff.com wrote: "The most understated role and perhaps the one that is most lingering, in terms of virtuosity, is that played by Madhuri Dixit. As Chandramukhi, she is simply stunning, lending passion, fire and gentleness with such consummate ease that watching her perform is sheer delight." The film was screened at the 2002 Cannes Film Festival and was featured by Time in their listing of the "10 Best Films of the Millennium". The film emerged as a major commercial success with revenues of over ₹530 million (US$5.7 million). Devdas was chosen as India's official entry for the Academy Award for Best Foreign Language Film and received a nomination for the BAFTA Award for Best Film Not in the English Language. At the 50th National Film Awards, the film won five awards, including the Best Popular Film Providing Wholesome Entertainment. Dixit eventually won the Filmfare Award for Best Supporting Actress and the Screen Award for Best Supporting Actress for her performance in the film. Post Devdas, Dixit took a break from actively working in films to focus on her married life in Denver, Colorado.

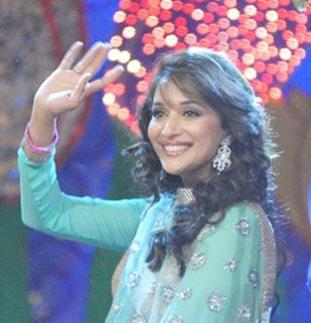
Dixit on the sets of Nach Baliye 3 during promotions of Aaja Nachle in 2007

In 2007, after a five-year hiatus from films, Dixit made her first comeback with a leading role in cinematographer Anil Mehta's dance film Aaja Nachle. She played Dia, a choreographer who returns to her town to save the endangered theatre where she learnt to dance. A box office failure, the film generated positive reviews for Dixit's portrayal. Rajeev Masand of CNN-IBN criticised the plot, while he wrote about Dixit's performance: "It's hard to take your eyes off the screen when she's up there, dazzling you with her spontaneity, her easy charm and her 100-watt smile." Her performance earned her another nomination for the Filmfare Award for Best Actress.

=== 2010s: Sporadic work ===
Dixit relocated to India with her family in 2011 and was felicitated by Filmfare with a special jury recognition for completing 25 years in the Indian film industry. In 2013, Dixit made a special appearance in the romantic comedy-drama Yeh Jawaani Hai Deewani. She appeared as Mohini, a callback to her character from the 1988 film Tezaab, in the song "Ghagra" alongside Ranbir Kapoor .

In 2014, Dixit first starred in the black comedy Dedh Ishqiya, a sequel to the 2010 film Ishqiya She played a con-woman, Begum Para, opposite Naseeruddin Shah, Arshad Warsi and Huma Qureshi and expressed that she agreed to do the film because of the "unapologetic way" director Abhishek Chaubey presented Vidya Balan's character in Ishqiya. The film opened to positive response from critics who called it "one of the year's most important releases". Anupama Chopra called Dixit "compelling", while Deepanjana Pal of Firstpost wrote "She's still capable of keeping an audience glued to their seats when the credits start rolling, all because she's dancing on screen.". The film earned Dixit her fourteenth nomination for the Filmfare Award for Best Actress. Dedh Ishqiya earned little at the box-office.

Her next release of the year was debutant director Soumik Sen's Gulaab Gang, alongside Juhi Chawla. Dixit portrayed Rajjo, the leader of a women's activist group, inspired by the real vigilante activist Sampat Pal Devi and her group Gulabi Gang. Pal filed a case against the film claiming that the makers did not take permission to make a film on her life, but the court later lifted the stay from the film. To prepare for her role, Dixit practised Shaolin Kung fu, stick training, and close combat. Gulaab Gang failed at the box office, earning mixed reviews. Subhash K. Jha labelled Dixit's performance and demeanour "inconsistent". However, Sampat Pal claimed that in Dixit's character she finds a "reflection of her own life so stark" that it makes her feel "it was she on screen". The film was a box-office failure.

Four years later, Dixit made her debut in Marathi Cinema with the comedy drama Bucket List. She played Madhura Sane, a middle aged housewife who takes the initiative to complete the bucket list of her deceased teenage heart donor. Dixit garnered critical acclaim for her portrayal; Mihir Bhanage of The Times of India wrote "Madhuri owns the film and sails through it with flying colours." Kunal Guha of Mumbai Mirror said, "Madhuri Dixit long-overdue debut in Marathi cinema is a comfort watch even if a tad predictable and sappy."

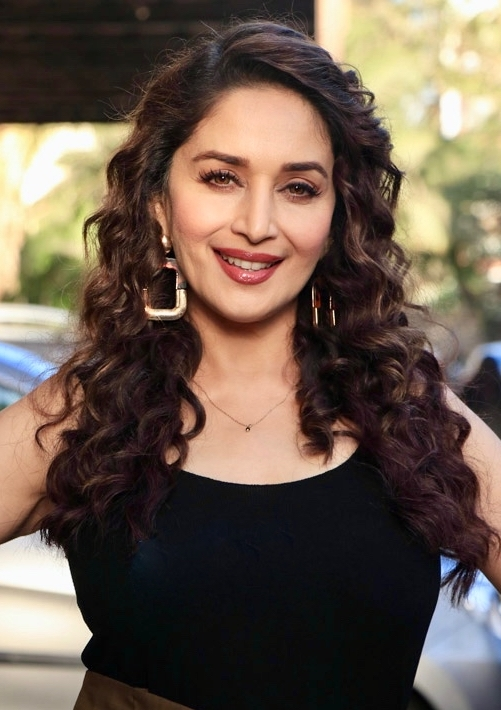
Dixit during promotions of Total Dhamaal in 2019.

Dixit reunited with Anil Kapoor and Ajay Devgn in Indra Kumar's adventure comedy Total Dhamaal (2019). She portrayed Bindu Patel, who along with a group of people learns about a hidden treasure and then races to claim it. The film received mixed to negative reviews, however, Dixit's performance received a mixed-to-positive reception. Lakshana N Palat of India Today wrote: "The little respite in this adventure-comedy is the pairing of Anil Kapoor and Madhuri Dixit, who prove that they still have the same impeccable chemistry and partnership almost two decades later." Total Dhamaal emerged as a major commercial success at the box office, grossing more than ₹200 crore (US$21 million) worldwide, and ranks as the ninth highest-grossing Hindi film of the year. Dixit produced the Marathi Netflix drama 15 August under her production company RnM Moving Pictures. In an interview with Scroll.in, Dixit said, "The film is about the freedom to love, the freedom to choose your career and the freedom to die".

She next starred in Abhishek Varman's period romantic drama Kalank, featuring an ensemble cast including Sonakshi Sinha, Alia Bhatt, Varun Dhawan, Aditya Roy Kapur and Sanjay Dutt. Set in the 1940s prior to the partition of India, the film featured her as Bahaar Begum, the madam of a brothel. Saibal Chatterjee of NDTV wrote, "In the blinding glow of Dixit's presence as a nautch girl who can turn on the magic at will, the younger cast members pale somewhat in comparison. She lights up the screen as only she can, pushing the others to strive harder." It did not perform well at the box office; however, she earned a third nomination for the Filmfare Award for Best Supporting Actress for her performance in the film.

=== 2020s: Streaming projects ===
Dixit was the lead actress in the 2022 Netflix family mystery series The Fame Game, where she played a high-profile actress. The same year, she portrayed a housewife struggling with her sexual identity in the Amazon Prime Video release Maja Ma. Rachana Dubey from The Times of India found Dixit to have delivered a "lived-in" performance.

After producing the Marathi-language comedy-drama Panchak in 2023, in 2024, she played a ghost in the horror comedy Bhool Bhulaiyaa 3, starring alongside Kartik Aaryan, Triptii Dimri, and Vidya Balan. The film emerged to be one of the highest-grossing Hindi films of the year.

In 2025, Dixit starred in the titular role in the JioHotstar web series Mrs. Deshpande, portraying a seemingly domesticated woman who hides a dark secret. Critics noted her restrained and nuanced performance, highlighting her ability to convey tension and complexity within the character.

In June 2026, Maa Behen, a black comedy thriller film directed by Suresh Triveni, with Dixit in the lead role was released.Along with Dixit, it stars Triptii Dimri, Dharna Durga, and Ravi Kishan. The film received mixed reviews, with some critics praising it while many chiding it.

== Other ventures ==
=== Television ===
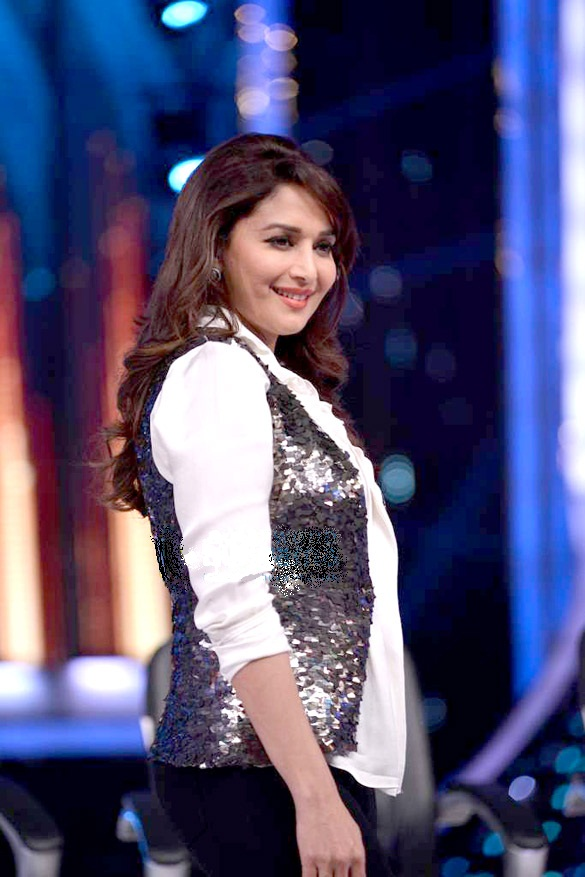
Dixit on the sets of Jhalak Dikhhla Jaa 6 in 2013.

In 1985, Dixit made her television debut in the Rajshri Production's series Paying Guest, in which she played Neena. In 2002, Dixit hosted Sony Entertainment's matrimonial show Kahi Na Kahi Koi Hai.

Since 2010, Dixit has featured as a talent judge for five seasons of the dance reality show Jhalak Dikhhla Jaa: alongside Remo D'Souza and Malaika Arora Khan for the fourth season, D'Souza and Karan Johar for the fifth, sixth, seventh seasons and alongside Johar and Nora Fatehi for the tenth season in 2022.

In 2011, she featured as an anchor to launch a new entertainment channel, Life OK. The same year, she hosted a competitive cooking game show, Food Food Maha Challenge along with Sanjeev Kapoor. In 2016, Dixit featured as one of the jury of So You Think You Can Dance (India), an officially licensed version of the So You Think You Can Dance franchise, based on the original American production created by Dick Clark Productions.

Since 2018, Dixit has co-judged four seasons of Colors TV's Dance Deewane, which gives an opportunity to contestants from three different generations.

=== Dancing and stage performances ===
Dixit has participated in several stage shows, concert tours and televised award ceremonies. Since the mid-1990s to early 2000s, she performed at the "Madhuri Dixit Live" concert in India, the Middle East and United States. In 2000, she performed at the Pepsi W2K Millennium Concert in Mumbai.

Between July and August 2008, Dixit and actors Abhishek Bachchan, Preity Zinta, Ritesh Deshmukh and Aishwarya Rai starred in Amitabh Bachchan's "Unforgettable World Tour" stage production in a 40-day show staged in 11 cities across North America, Europe and the Caribbean.

The same year, she joined the fourth instalment of "Temptation Reloaded" where she performed with Khan, Rani Mukerji, Fernandez and Meiyang Chang in Auckland, Perth, Sydney and Dubai; and in 2014 she performed in Malaysia with Khan, Mukerji and Arijit Singh. Dixit also performed in SLAM! The Tour which was held in the US, Canada, and London.

In 2015, Dixit participated in the show Fusion in Houston, along with Akshay Kumar, Sonakshi Sinha and Prabhu Deva. In 2018, she performed at the inaugural ceremony of Men's Hockey World Cup.

In 2013, Dixit launched her own online dance academy "Dance With Madhuri", where the users get an opportunity to learn to dance various dance styles and have one-on-one lessons.

=== Music ===
Dixit has sung small portions in a few songs from her films like "Kaahe Chhed" from Devdas and "Soniye Mil Ja" from Aaja Nachle, composed by Birju Maharaj and Salim–Sulaiman respectively. For her 2014 film Gulaab Gang, Dixit sang the traditional folk song "Rangi Sari Gulaabi Chunariya" alongside her mother Snehlata Dixit, composed and recreated for the film by its director Soumik Sen.

Dixit made her official singing debut in 2020 with an English single, "Candle", dedicating it to frontline workers fighting the COVID-19 pandemic. She released a second single, "Tu Hai Mera", in 2022.

== Social and humanitarian work ==
During her years in the film industry, Dixit has been actively involved in promoting children's education and the safety of women. She featured in a series of one-minute telespots on preventing AIDS for the Maharashtra State AIDS Control Society in 2000. In 2001, Dixit won ₹ 5,000,000 on Kaun Banega Crorepati, a game show then in its first season on the air. She donated her winnings for the welfare of the victims of 2001 Gujarat earthquake and to an orphanage in Pune.

In 2009, Dixit performed for NDTV Toyota Greenathon—India's first-ever nationwide campaign for saving the environment and creating awareness about environmental issues. NDTV organised India's first 24-hour live telethon, a fund-raising event that brings in people to donate money to support TERI's initiative—Lighting a Billion Lives which aims at providing solar power to villages without electricity.

On 3 February 2011, Dixit spent an evening with 75 orphanage kids of farmers at an ashram in Trimbakeshwar and participated in the birthdays of two children: Hrishikesh and Rani. "We artists are ready to help such children. People from the higher society should come forward and stand firmly behind them," she said on the occasion. Dixit is a Goodwill Ambassador and a patron for "Emeralds for Elephants" – a charity project for the conservation of Asian elephants and other endangered species. The project has been designed to create awareness and raise vital funds for the protection of the critically endangered Asian elephant. A collaborative project between the World Land Trust (a UK based nonprofit environmental organisation) and the Wildlife Trust of India that is creating protected wildlife corridors connecting National Parks and protected areas to others. Speaking about the issue she said: "Elephants are one of my favourite animals and I love them. So what we need to do today is to see how we can preserve our animals. I feel very strongly about this." Two years later, she made donations to the Uttarakhand flood relief.

In June 2013, while shooting for the sixth season of Jhalak Dikhhla Jaa, Dixit rescued seven puppies who were drenched in rain. Interrupting the shoot, Dixit, along with her husband Sriram Nene and the show's director Saahil Chhabria contacted PETA, waiting till the volunteers arrived. In response, Sachin Bangera of PETA India said, "It's been raining cats and dogs and many puppies and kittens are now in need of good homes. Madhuri Dixit, Dr Nene and Saahil Chhabria's kind deed will inspire many to come forward to help animals in distress."

In January 2014, Dixit and her husband, on behalf of PETA wrote letter to Kolhapur MLA Vinay Kore, requesting him to ensure relocation of the elephant Sunder to a sanctuary – "(Sunder) has scars on his legs and cowers in fear and pain because he is being beaten by his mahout," "He should live free from suffering, in the company of other elephants, and have the opportunity to roam vast distances".

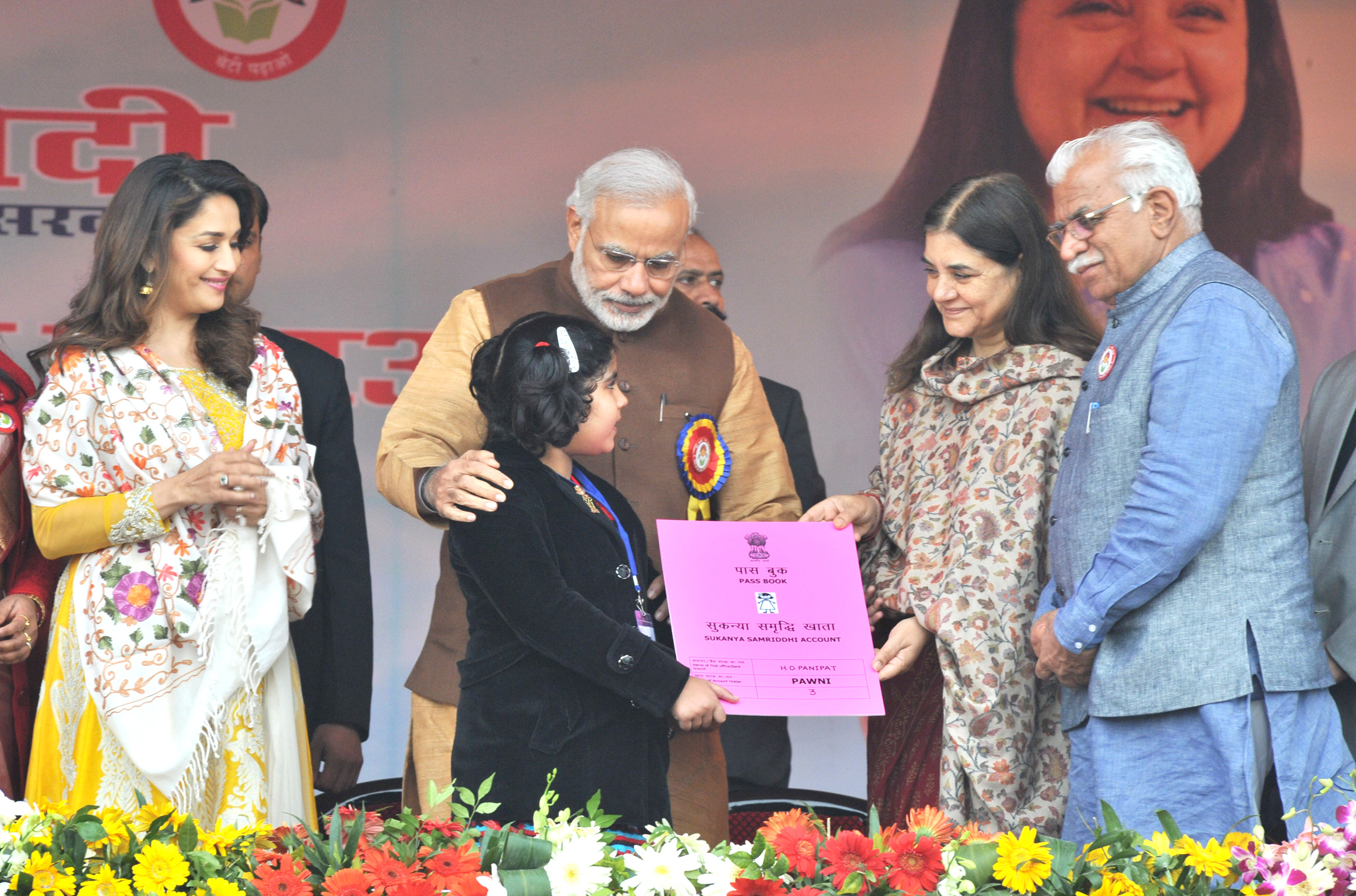
Dixit at the launch of "Beti Bachao Beti Padhao" campaign alongside PM Narendra Modi, Union Minister Maneka Gandhi and Haryana CM Manohar Lal Khattar in 2015

Since 2014, Dixit began working with UNICEF to advocate the rights of children and prevent child labour and child trafficking. She participated in a fashion show organised by Lilavati hospital, to support the 'Save & Empower the Girl Child' initiative by the organisation. The same year, the Government of Madhya Pradesh appointed her as the brand ambassador for its Mamta Abhiyaan (maternal and child health) campaign. Dixit collaborated with Vogue for its Vogue Empower series on a short film on gender policing, 'Boys don't cry', directed by Vinil Mathew. She was appointed as the brand ambassador for the Beti Bachao Beti Padhao campaign, by the Government of India in 2015, that aims to generate awareness and improve the efficiency of welfare services intended for girls. She lent her voice for narrating the story of one of the eight girls who featured in Girl Rising: Woh Padhegi, Woh Udegi, a film on the education and empowerment of girls. Dixit was appointed the brand ambassador and launched MAA (Mothers Absolute Affection), a flagship programme to ensure adequate awareness is generated on the benefits of breastfeeding.

Additionally, Dixit has made public appearances to support charities and causes. On 4 February 2012, Madhuri Dixit interacted with Cancer affected children on World Cancer Day which was organised by Pawan Hans Helicopters Ltd at Juhu, Mumbai. In 2013, she launched Sanofi India's campaign on World Diabetes Day (WDD), that encourages people to take proactive steps to effectively prevent, manage and control diabetes. A year later, on 24 February 2014, she visited a school in Andheri, Mumbai to support the "Support My School" campaign. She participated in 'Set Beautiful Free'– an event by One Foundation to provide home, education, food and healthcare to the daughters of trafficking victims. In 2018, she attended a charity event by 'Nanhi Kali' NGO.

On 17 March 2019, Dixit and her family adopted an abandoned puppy rescued by PETA India. She said, "Abandoning a companion dog or cat is the cruelest thing to do. I'm happy we will be able to give this pup a new lease of life,".

In March 2021, Dixit along with other Bollywood actors John Abraham, Shilpa Shetty and Sunny Leone joined PETA India for its 20th anniversary. In the virtual party, awards were given to those who have been championing animal rights. Dixit recalling joining the organisation to help elephants recalled, "From there on it was the beginning of a beautiful friendship. Two years ago, my family adopted Carmelo, a cherished dog, from PETA India. Since then, I urge everyone I see to adopt a dog or a cat from the shelter or from the street."

False representation in endorsements

In May–June 2015 the Tamil Nadu Consumer's Forum sent her notices for "false representation" in advertisements of Maggi, a noodle brand in which toxic levels of lead were found. She continued endorsing the safety of the product on Twitter, even when food regulators had already found more than 17 times the permissible limits of lead and the product was banned.

== Reception and legacy ==
=== Artistry ===
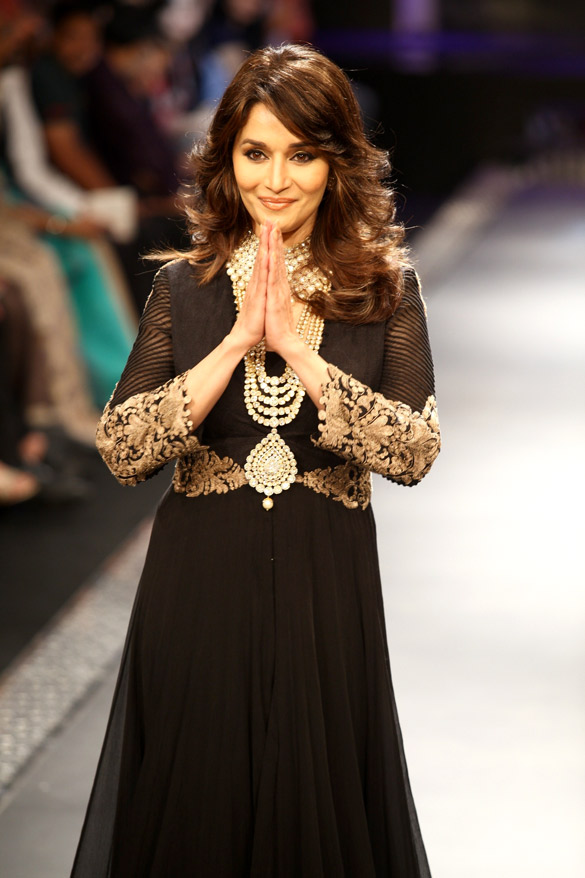
Dixit on the ramp for PC Jeweller at the grand finale of India International Jewellery Week 2012

Dixit is regarded as one of the most accomplished and influential actresses of Indian cinema. Throughout the late 1980s, the 1990s and the early 2000s, Dixit was among the highest-paid actresses in the Indian entertainment industry. In 2000, the Guinness World Records book featured her as the highest-paid Indian actress. Dixit was placed at the first position by NDTV in 2012, in the listing of "The most popular Bollywood actresses of all time". The next year, she was placed at the fourth position, behind Amitabh Bachchan, Dilip Kumar and Shah Rukh Khan and topped among female actors as the greatest Bollywood star in a UK poll celebrating 100 years of Indian cinema. The same year, in a national poll conducted by CNN-IBN on the occasion of the centenary of Indian cinema, Dixit was voted at the second position, behind Sridevi, as "India's Greatest Actress in 100 Years". In 2017, Dixit topped an India Today poll as the most popular actress of Hindi cinema till date.

Dixit has a significant following in the South Asian diaspora. While analysing her career, Reuters published, "In her prime, Dixit was the undisputed queen of Bollywood, the world's largest film industry by audience size, and her popularity and fees rivaled even the biggest male stars." Throughout her career, Dixit has played roles in both mainstream productions and independent films, and appeared in a range of film genres, with Saibal Chatterjee of Outlook crediting Hum Aapke Hain Koun..! as metamorphosing Dixit into a "subcontinental icon". The New York Times called Dixit, "India's biggest female star".

Discussing her performances, Baradwaj Rangan labelled her as "the last of the all-in-one female stars who could do drama and comedy and dance" and Firstpost called her, "one of the last superstars of Hindi cinema", praising her performances in Lajja, Devdas and Dedh Ishqiya. In 2010, Filmfare Magazine included her performance from Mrityudand in its list of "80 Iconic Performances". Dixit is credited in the media for her versatility and achieving a "balance of critical acclaim and commercial success."

In addition to acting, she has been noted for her skills as a dancer. Kathak dancer Pandit Birju Maharaj, who choreographed Dixit in Devdas, calls her "the best Bollywood dancer" due to her versatility. Saroj Khan, who has collaborated with her on numerous occasions, calls her a "choreographer's delight". Hindustan Times attributed her for giving a 'technical twist' to dance sequences in Hindi films. Dixit was the muse for Indian painter M. F. Husain. He got fascinated by Dixit's performance in Hum Aapke Hain Koun..!; watching the film 67 times, and booked an entire theatre to see her comeback Aaja Nachle. He made a series of paintings of her, and in 2000 directed Gaja Gamini starring her, which was intended as a tribute to Dixit herself.

=== Media image ===
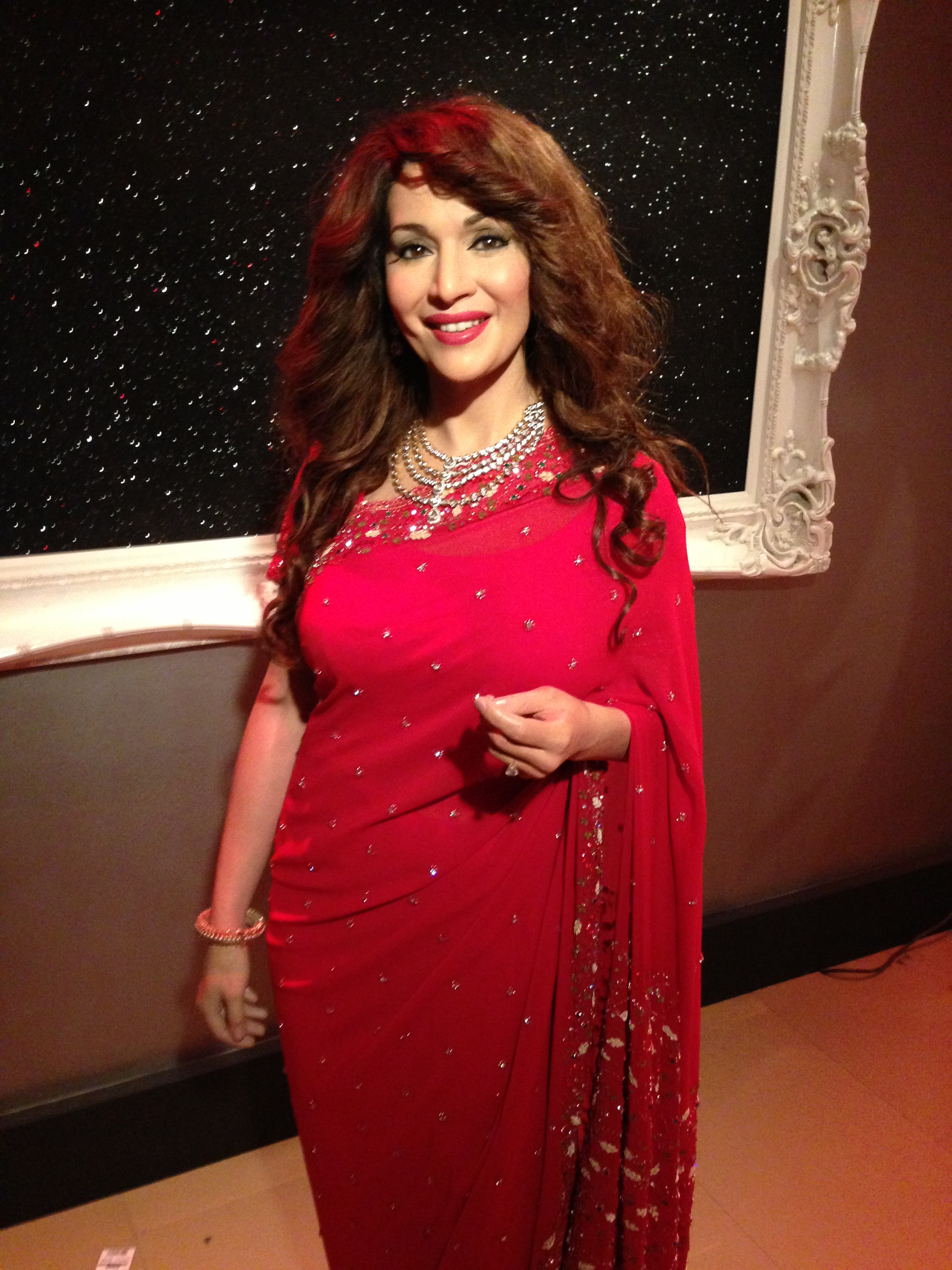
Dixit's wax statue at Madame Tussauds, London

Dixit featured in Box Office India's Top Actresses list for ten consecutive years (1988–1997). In 2001, Forbes placed her at fifth position in the list of "top five most powerful Indian film stars". In 2002 and 2014, Dixit featured in Rediff's annual "Top Bollywood Actresses" listing. She has been featured frequently on other Rediff lists, including "Bollywood's Most Beautiful Actresses", "Bollywood's Best Actresses Ever" and "Top 10 Bollywood Actresses of all Time". The Economic Times featured her in the list of "33 women who made India proud" in 2010. In 1997, the Government of Andhra Pradesh honoured her with the "Kalabhinetri Award". In 2001, Dixit was awarded the National Citizens' Award for her work and contribution to Indian cinema. In 2008, the Government of India honoured her with the Padma Shri for her contribution to Indian Cinema. The Sathyabama University honoured her as the "Inspiring Icon of India" in 2015. An unauthorised biography of her named Madhuri Dixit, written by professor Nandana Bose was released in 2019.

Dixit is frequently referred to as one of the most attractive Indian celebrities and has been described as a sex symbol. Her eyes, sex appeal and urban looks have been cited by the media as her distinctive features; her smile being identified as her trademark. She featured in The Times of India's list of 50 Beautiful Faces of cinema and Hindustan Times called her "a classic Indian beauty". Her look and performances have established her as a style icon. In 2007, 2013–16 and 2018, the UK magazine Eastern Eye ranked her as one of "World's Sexiest Asian Women".

Sangetsar Tso lake in Arunachal Pradesh was renamed Madhuri Lake after her, where a song from Koyla was picturised. She has a star named after her in the Orion constellation. In March 2012, a wax figure of Dixit was put on display in London's Madame Tussaud's wax museum. In 2017, two other figures were displayed at Madame Tussaud's Museum in Singapore and Delhi. Every year since its inception in 2012, Dixit has featured on Forbes India's "Celebrity 100," a list based on the income and popularity of India's celebrities with the exception of 2017. In 2018, she was among the twenty Indians invited for the Oscar Academy's Class of 2018.

== Personal life ==
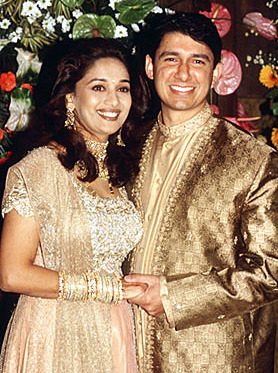
Dixit with husband Shriram Nene, at their reception in 1999

Amidst media speculation on her personal life, Dixit married Shriram Madhav Nene, a cardiovascular surgeon from Los Angeles, California on 17 October 1999, in a traditional ceremony held at the residence of Dixit's elder brother in Southern California. Nene had never seen any of her films, and was unaware of her celebrity status. Dixit explained their relationship by saying, "It was very important that he didn't know me as an actress because then he would know me as a person first. When people have seen you as an actress, they have pre-conceived notions... None of it was there here with him. I found the right person, I wanted to get married and I did." Dixit and Nene's wedding reception in Mumbai was attended by several prominent Indian personalities, including then Chief Minister of Maharashtra Vilasrao Deshmukh, Shivsena chief Bal Thackeray, Dilip Kumar, Saira Banu, Yash Chopra, Sridevi, and many others.

Following her marriage, Dixit relocated to Denver, Colorado, for over a decade. On 17 March 2003, Dixit gave birth to a son, Arin. Two years later, on 8 March 2005, she gave birth to another son, Ryan. She described motherhood as "amazing" and added that her kids kept "the child in her alive".

Dixit moved back to Mumbai with her family in October 2011. Speaking about it, Dixit said, "I always love being here. I have grown up here in Mumbai so for me it is like coming back home. It was a different phase in my life, where I wanted to have a home, family, husband and children... everything that I had dreamt of."

In 2018, Dixit along with her husband, founded the production company, RnM Moving Pictures. They both also together earned orange belts in taekwondo.

== Accolades ==
Dixit has received six Filmfare Awards from a record seventeen nominations, including four Best Actress awards for Dil (1990), Beta (1992), Hum Aapke Hain Kaun! (1994) and Dil To Pagal Hai (1997), and a Filmfare Award for Best Supporting Actress for Devdas (2002). She earned a Filmfare Special Award for completing 25 years in the Indian film industry. In 2008, she was awarded the Padma Shri, the fourth-highest Indian civilian award, by the Government of India for her contributions to the arts. In 2023, she was awarded the Special Recognition for Contribution to Bharatiya Cinema Award at the 54th IFFI.

== In popular culture ==
- In a popular scene from the 1994 cult comedy Andaz Apna Apna, Dixit's photo appears on the cover of a film magazine. Amar (played by Aamir Khan) jokingly teases Prem (played by Salman Khan), implying he was once engaged to Dixit — pointing to her photo as part of the gag.
- In the song "Maine Kal Ek Sapna Dekha" from the 1997 film Sanam, Dixit's name is playfully referenced in the final line. The song, featuring Sanjay Dutt dreaming about various Bollywood actresses, ends with the declaration: “Banegi Madhuri Meri Dulhan” ("Madhuri will become my bride").
- In the hit song "Tan Tana Tan Tan" from the 1997 comedy Judwaa, Dixit's name is mentioned alongside Govinda's in a playful lyric. The song was later recreated for the film's 2017 remake, but the line referencing the two stars was omitted.
- In 1997, the television serial Mrs. Madhuri Dixit was named after Dixit. It aired on Zee TV and starred Renuka Shahane — Dixit’s co-star from her 1994 blockbuster Hum Aapke Hain Koun..!.
- In the 1998 romantic comedy-drama Kuch Kuch Hota Hai, Dixit’s name is humorously referenced during a summer camp scene where characters play Dumb Charades. Rahul (played by Shah Rukh Khan) guesses the film by exclaiming, “Mummy, Madhuri Dixit!” before naming Hum Aapke Hain Koun..!, in a nod to Dixit’s iconic role in that film.
- In the 1999 Pulitzer Prize-winning short story collection Interpreter of Maladies mentioned Dixit in the short story "Sexy." When the character Miranda asks Dev what his wife looked like, he states his wife resembled Dixit.
- In the mystery thriller Ajnabee (2001), there's a comedic moment where the character L.P. (played by Narendra Bedi) tells C.D. (played by Amita Nangia) that she's not Champa Devi (C.D.) but "M.D." — to which she coyly responds by calling herself "Madhuri Dixit."
- In 2003, the film Main Madhuri Dixit Banna Chahti Hoon was released, starring Antara Mali as a small-town woman who dreams of becoming the next Madhuri Dixit. Produced by Ram Gopal Varma, the film was a tribute to Dixit and was dedicated to her.
- In 2008, the episode "The Bad Fish Paradigm" of the American sitcom The Big Bang Theory (originally aired on CBS) featured a scene in which the characters Raj Koothrapali (played by Kunal Nayyar) and Sheldon Cooper (played by Jim Parsons) are shown to be arguing over Dixit and actress Aishwarya Rai. In March 2023, political analyst Mithun Vijay Kumar filed a court case in Mumbai against Netflix for insulting Dixit in the episode.
- The 2012 film Shirin Farhad Ki Toh Nikal Padi featured a song that paid homage to some iconic Bollywood films of the 1990s. Dixit herself unveiled the film’s first look, which showed the leads Farah Khan and Boman Irani in costumes paying tribute to Dixit and Salman Khan's iconic looks from the song "Didi Tera Devar Deewana".
- Before the release of Sanju (2018), a biopic on Sanjay Dutt, it was speculated in the media that television actress Karishma Tanna would be portraying Madhuri Dixit in the film. However, the film did not feature any direct reference to Dixit.

== See also ==
- List of dancers
- List of Indian film actresses
