= Hifazat (1987 film) =

- Directed by: Prayag Raj
- Written by: Kader Khan (dialogue); K. K. Shukla (screenplay); Prayag Raj (story)
- Produced by: A. Suryanarayana
- Starring: Anil Kapoor; Madhuri Dixit
- Cinematography: Anwar Siraj
- Edited by: A. Paul Duraisingam
- Music by: R. D. Burman
- Production company: Satyachitra International
- Distributed by: Goldmines Telefilms
- Release date: 18 September 1987
- Country: India
- Language: Hindi

Hifazat (Safeguarding) is a 1987 Bollywood drama film directed by Prayag Raj. It stars Anil Kapoor, Madhuri Dixit in pivotal roles. The music of the film was composed by R. D. Burman. The film was a commercial failure. Later this movie was partially remade in Telugu as Bobbili Raja.

== Plot ==
After Laxmi has had three stillbirths, her husband, Satyaprakash, and his mother are afraid she will not be able to have any more children, and therefore there will be no one to carry the name of the family forward. So they propose that Satyaprakash gets married for a second time, to which Laxmi consents and as such he marries Rukmani. After this marriage, Laxmi gets pregnant and gives birth to a son, Raj Kumar, and shortly thereafter Rukmani too gives birth to a son, Lakhan. Raj Kumar is abducted and disappears from their lives. Thereafter, Satyaprakash is arrested for the murder of a contractor and sentenced to prison. Rukmani and her brother, Buddhiram, take over running the household and inflict abuse on Laxmi. Years later, a young man appears claiming to be the missing son of Laxmi and Satyaprakash, and he attempts to bring some sense and honor for poor Laxmi. But this does not last for long. When Satyaprakash is released from prison, he recognizes the young man as his fellow prison inmate, and much to the shock and dismay of Laxmi, asks him to leave the house, little knowing that he has now thrown open the door for Buddhiram to kill him and Laxmi.

== Cast ==
- Ashok Kumar as Kailashnath
- Nutan as Laxmi
- Anil Kapoor as Raj Kumar / Ram
- Madhuri Dixit as Janki
- Lalita Pawar
- Pran as Thakur Satyaprakash
- Bindu as Rukmini
- Kader Khan as Buddhiram
- Shakti Kapoor as Lakhan
- Gulshan Grover as Gullu
- Sharat Saxena as Shambhu Dada
- Shubha Khote as Ganga
- Bharat Bhushan as Special Appearance In Song "Ram Ki Baaten Ram Hi Jaane"

== Music ==
The songs were written by Anand Bakshi and music was composed by R. D. Burman.

Song	Singer
"Ajooba Ajooba"	R. D. Burman
"Dil Ka Darwajja"	Asha Bhosle
"Mohabbat Hai Kya"	Asha Bhosle, Suresh Wadkar
"Ram Ki Baaten, Ram Hi Jaane"	Anuradha Paudwal, Mohammed Aziz
"Batata Vada, Batata Vada"	S. P. Balasubrahmanyam, S. Janaki
