= Deewana Mujh Sa Nahin =

- Poster
- Directed by: Y. Nageshwar Rao
- Written by: M. Parvez
- Produced by: Aji
- Starring: Aamir Khan; Madhuri Dixit; Jainendra
- Cinematography: Ashok Behal; Nadeem Khan
- Edited by: K. A. Martano
- Music by: Anand–Milind
- Production company: Vandana Productions
- Release date: 20 July 1990
- Running time: 130 minutes
- Language: Hindi

Deewana Mujh Sa Nahin (transl. No One's As Crazy As Me) is a 1990 Indian romantic action film directed by Y. Nageshwar Rao and starring Aamir Khan, Madhuri Dixit and Jainendra.

It's a remake of the 1986 Pakistani movie Beyqaraar.

== Plot ==
Ajay Sharma (Aamir Khan) is a photographer, Anita (Madhuri Dixit) is a model, and both of them work for the same agency. Ajay has fallen in love with Anita, and thinks that she is also in love with him. But Anita only takes him for a friend. She gets engaged to Vikram (Jainendra), and the marriage is to take place soon. Ajay still believes that Anita loves him, and he also starts making preparations for his marriage to Anita. Anita must now take appropriate steps to stop Ajay's obsession with her before the matter gets out of hand. However, Anita realizes the person she is marrying does not love her, and through certain circumstances, also realizes Ajay's true love for her, and the film ends on a happy note.

== Cast ==
- Aamir Khan as Ajay Sharma
- Madhuri Dixit as Anita
- Jainendra as Vikram
- Khushbu as Sonu
- Satyendra Kapoor as Nandkishore Sharma
- Beena Banerjee as Mrs. Sharma
- Dinesh Hingoo as Bholaram Bokade
- Narendra Nath as Anita's uncle
- Deven Verma as Mamaji, Ajay's uncle
- Yunus Parvez as Police Inspector
- Babbanlal Yadav as Sharma
- Ranjeeta Kaur as Anita's sister

== Soundtrack ==
The music for Deewana Mujh Sa Nahin was composed by Anand–Milind with lyrics by Sameer.

#	Title	Singer(s)
1	"Main Sehra Bandh Ke"	Udit Narayan
2	"Deewana Mujh Sa Nahin"	Udit Narayan
3	"Saare Ladkon Ki"	Kavita Krishnamurthy
4	"Hum Tum Se Mohabat"	Amit Kumar, Sadhana Sargam
5	"Mehendi Mehendi"	Aparna Mayekar
6	"Khadi Raho Baith Jao"	Udit Narayan, Sadhana Sargam
