= Anjaam =

1994 Indian film by Rahul Rawail

- Theatrical release poster
- Directed by: Rahul Rawail
- Written by: Rumi Jaffery
- Story by: Sutanu Gupta; Gautam Rajadhyaksha
- Produced by: Maharukh Johki; Rita Rawail
- Starring: Madhuri Dixit; Shah Rukh Khan
- Cinematography: Sameer Arya
- Edited by: Suresh Chaturvedi
- Music by: Anand–Milind
- Production company: Shiv-Bharat films
- Release date: 22 April 1994
- Running time: 171 mins
- Country: India
- Language: Hindi
- Budget: ₹2.65 crore
- Box office: est.₹9.66 crore

Anjaam (transl. Consequence) is a 1994 Indian Hindi-language psychological crime thriller film directed by Rahul Rawail. It stars Madhuri Dixit and Shah Rukh Khan in lead roles with an ensemble supporting cast including Sudha Chandran, Tinnu Anand, Johnny Lever, Beena Banerjee, Kiran Kumar, Kalpana Iyer and Himani Shivpuri, with Deepak Tijori in a guest appearance. This was the first time that Dixit and Khan were paired together. The film's music was composed by Anand–Milind, with lyrics written by Sameer. Dixit plays the protagonist and Khan plays the antagonist.

At the 40th Filmfare Awards, Anjaam won Khan the Best Villain award for his performance, after having failed to win the award the previous year for his performance in Yash Chopra's Darr. Moreover, the film also earned Dixit her 7th nomination for Best Actress, but she instead won the award for Hum Aapke Hain Koun..! Khan has bought the rights to this film under his banner, Red Chillies Entertainment.

== Plot ==
Shivani Chopra is an air hostess for Air India. She lives with her sister Padmisha and her brother-in-law Mohanlal, who is a drunkard and bets all the money he can find on horse races. Shivani meets Vijay Agnihotri, a wealthy industrialist who is instantly infatuated with her, but she shows no interest in him. Vijay is the owner of his family industries; he first tries to get Shivani to model for them, but she does not even consider it. He continues to pursue her to be her lover, but is rejected every time. Vijay informs his mother, Padma, that he will only marry Shivani.

When they approach Shivani's family for her hand in marriage, they see that Shivani is marrying Ashok Chopra, an Air India pilot. Vijay is heartbroken, shocked, and disappointed, while Shivani and Ashok get posted right after their wedding and move to America.

Four years later, Vijay cannot forget Shivani and turns down all the marriage proposals brought by his mother. Shivani and Ashok have a daughter, Pinky. Shivani left her job as an air hostess and began volunteering at a hospital for the mentally and physically disabled. Vijay befriends Ashok in hopes of getting closer to Shivani. He plans to start his own airline, where he hires Ashok as a general manager with a high salary. Unaware of Vijay's intentions, Ashok doesn't believe Shivani who tries to convince him of Vijay's true colours.

Vijay gives Shivani and Ashok a new company home. After moving in, Shivani finds out she is pregnant. She shares the news with her husband, but Vijay interrupts, revealing that he's used Shivani's photos as advertisements for the new airline. This enrages Shivani, who demands that Vijay leave and then insists that Ashok quit his job as well as the new house, and that she will work to support the family instead. Insulted and angered, Ashok slaps and disowns Shivani, who leaves the house, much to his great regret.

Vijay witnessing this has an episode and severely beats Ashok. When he is hospitalized, Vijay removes Ashok's oxygen mask in the presence of Shivani thereby killing him. She attempts to convince the police that Vijay is responsible for Ashok's death. However, Vijay bribes his friend, Inspector Arjun Singh, to provide an alibi and is not charged. Despite Arjun telling him that what he did was wrong, Vijay refuses to stop thinking about Shivani and giving up. All this while, he visits and begs Shivani to say she loves him. As she refuses, he beats her up and frames her for his attempted murder. She is sentenced to 3 years in prison as she could not prove her innocence. Pinky is placed in the care of Padmisha and Mohanlal. Mohanlal mistreats his wife and calls Pinky a burden.

Shivani meets Nisha, her cellmate who was wrongly accused of murder in a case of dowry. They share their pain in prison under the watch of a brutal prison warden, who would force the prison inmates into prostitution for political leaders at night. One day, Shivani vomits during a politician's visit to take a prisoner for the night. In an attempt to escape from prison, she makes a complaint about the brutality of her prison guard but her plea is ignored. Instead, Inspector Arjun reveals to the warden that it was Shivani who filed a complaint against her illegal activities. The prison guard learns that Shivani is pregnant from the visit, and gives her a severe beating and throws her into a dark isolation cell, which causes her to have a miscarriage.

Mohanlal forces Padmisha to disown Pinky, but she refuses. In response, he kicks both Padmisha and Pinky out. Vijay visits Shivani in prison with the promise of freeing her, as well as news about his alleged relationship with another woman who bears her name, but Shivani still refuses. A depressed Vijay then accidentally kills Shivani's sister and daughter by running his car over them. Shivani learns about their deaths and realizes Vijay is the one who killed them. With all of her loved ones dead, Shivani, now hardended with hatred, only has a motive to live now with exacting revenge on all the people who wronged her.

She begins with the prison guard by planning a night-long worship event at the jail, staging an alibi for herself. Shivani sneaks away and kills the prison warden by dragging her to the gallows and hanging her. As there is no evidence, Shivani is not convicted.

Three years later, Shivani is released from prison. First, she kills Mohanlal by choking him with rupee notes and chewing off a significant amount of flesh from his arm. Inspector Arjun suspects Shivani of the murder. While Shivani is mourning her daughter at her grave, Inspector Arjun steps right on her grave to rudely intercept her. He chases her and tries to rape her in a barn. However, Shivani overpowers him and sets the barn on fire, leaving him to die.

Shivani visits Vijay's home but learns that Vijay and his mother moved out of there two years ago. She decides to dedicate her life to serving the disabled at the hospital she used to volunteer at. The doctor there suggested she stay at their new sanatorium in Tikamgarh. When she gets there, she finds out that the sanatorium was built by Vijay's mother. Shivani finds Vijay in a paralyzed state at the sanatorium, losing his ability to move due to the car accident which killed Shivani's sister and daughter. She volunteers to rehabilitate him.

Vijay gets cured with Shivani's love and attention. Vijay tells Shivani once again to say she loves him and to marry him, as she has no other options in life. Shivani embraces him before stabbing him. She confesses that she nursed him to health for one purpose: to kill him, as it is a sin to kill an incapacitated person who cannot defend himself. In their scuffle, they end up dangling from a cliff with Vijay hanging onto Shivani's foot. Vijay says that if he falls to his death, he shall take Shivani with him. Deciding that it is more important for Vijay to die than for her to live, Shivani lets go, causing them both to fall to their deaths.

== Cast ==
- Madhuri Dixit as Shivani Chopra
- Shahrukh Khan as Vijay Agnihotri-The Main Antagonist
- Tinnu Anand as Mohanlal Singh, Shivani's brother-in-law and Padmisha's husband.secondary antagonist
- Sudha Chandran as Padmisha Singh, Shivani's sister and Mohanlal's wife.
- Johnny Lever as Champa Chameli
- Beena Banerjee as Padma Agnihotri, Vijay's mother.
- Kiran Kumar as Inspector Arjun Singh,third antagonist
- Kalpana Iyer as Prison Warden
- Dinesh Hingoo as Minister
- Baby Gazala as Pinky Chopra, Ashok and Shivani's daughter.
- Shriram Lagoo as Finance
- Himani Shivpuri as Nisha, Shivani's friend.

Guest appearance

- Deepak Tijori as Ashok Chopra, Shivani's late husband.

== Production ==
Anjaam marked the first of many collaborations between Dixit and Khan.

== Soundtrack ==
=== Track listing ===
No.	Title	Singer(s)	Length
1.	"Badi Mushkil Hai"	Abhijeet Bhattacharya	5:30
2.	"Channe Ke Khet Mein"	Poornima Shrestha	6:03
3.	"Tu Saamne Jab Aata Hai"	Udit Narayan, Alka Yagnik	6:00
4.	"Barson Ke Baad"	Alka Yagnik	4:14
5.	"Sunn Meri Banno"	Alka Yagnik	5:56
6.	"Kolhapur Se Aayi"	Sadhana Sargam	5:08
7.	"Pratighat Ki Jwala"	Sapna Awasthi	1:50
Total length:			34:41
