= Mrityudand =

1997 Indian film by Prakash Jha

- Theatrical release poster
- Directed by: Prakash Jha
- Screenplay by: Prakash Jha
- Produced by: Prakash Jha
- Starring: Madhuri Dixit; Shabana Azmi; Ayub Khan; Mohan Agashe; Om Puri; Mohan Joshi
- Cinematography: Rajan Kinagi; Rajan Kothari
- Edited by: Prakash Jha
- Music by: Anand–Milind
- Release date: 11 July 1997
- Running time: 161 minutes
- Country: India
- Language: Hindi
- Budget: ₹50 million
- Box office: ₹80 million

Mrityudand (transl. Death penalty) is an Indian Hindi drama film released in 1997. It was directed and produced by Prakash Jha and stars Madhuri Dixit, Shabana Azmi, Ayub Khan, Mohan Agashe and Om Puri.

The film is a commentary on social and gender injustice. As with his other movies, Jha focuses on the social problems of his native state of Bihar, and Mrityudand straddles the boundary between artistic and commercial films. It includes semi-classical music, tuned by Anand–Milind and Raghunath Seth and worded by Javed Akhtar. The film was critically acclaimed and is considered to be one of Dixit's best performances.

== Synopsis ==
The movie is set in the village of Bilaspur, part of Bihar in 1996. A mob kills two defenseless women, orchestrated by vested interests, and this incident sets the tone for much of the rest of the movie, which shows how powerful individuals evade inquiries into the crime.

The central characters are a young couple, Vinay (Ayub Khan) and Ketki (Madhuri Dixit). They become involved in the machinations of several powerful and unscrupulous villagers. Foremost among them is contractor Tirpat Singh (Mohan Joshi), a powerful, corrupt and ruthless man who oppresses poor people and especially women with impunity. Vinay becomes influenced by Tirpat, leading to domestic abuse, alcoholism, and a selfishness that alienates his loving wife and tears apart the whole family, despite her best efforts to fight this.

The rest of the movie deals with their efforts to break out of their situation, both within and outside of their relationship, and Vinay's and especially Ketki's bloody struggle to confront and defeat the forces of oppression and male domination in the village.

== Cast ==
- Madhuri Dixit as Ketki Singh
- Shabana Azmi as Chandravati
- Ayub Khan as Vinay Singh
- Om Puri as Rambaran Mahto
- Shilpa Shirodkar as Kanti
- Mohan Joshi as Tirpat Singh
- Mohan Agashe as Abhay Singh
- Harish Patel as MLA Durga Pandey
- Achyut Potdar as Ketki's father (Special Appearance)
- Mona Ambegaonkar in a Special Appearance

== Soundtrack ==
1. "Keh Do Ek Bar Sajana Itna Kyu Pyar Sajna" – Udit Narayan, Alka Yagnik
2. "Raat Maheke To Yun Bhi Hota Hai Chand" – Sadhana Sargam, Hariharan
3. "Itani Hai Mori Kahani Ke Raja Mai To Ho Gayi Tori Diwani" – Sadhana Sargam
4. "Kab Se Main Hun Khadi Beech Dhare, Dur Nadiya Ke" – Sadhana Sargam
5. "Tum Bin Man Ki Bat Adhuri, Din Hai Adhure" – Kumar Sanu, Sadhana Sargam

== Release ==
The film was released on 11 July 1997. It was declared tax-free in theatres of Mumbai.

Mrityudand was invited for the gala premiere at BFI London Film Festival in 1997.

== Reception ==
Anupama Chopra of India Today wrote: "Mrityudand is not a great film but it is a good one. It can't match the power of a Thelma & Louise or Mirch Masala but it packs a solid wallop. And in these dumb and dumber times, it is a refreshing change."

The reviewer for Screen called the film "a superbly crafted web of intrigue that gets darker and murkier till it reaches horrifying proportions of cruelty and ferociousness". Noting it to be "passionate, highly articulate, and never confused", they stated that the film "questions the limited definition of woman merely as a wife or a mother, and goes on to show strong women who define themselves as individuals." The reviewer praised the acting performances as well as Jha's creation of a film which "not only has something to say, but says it well. There are no hysterical histrionics. There is no hypocrisy and false rhetoric which one finds so often in films which profess to be socially progressive for women. The songs are situational and elegant."

=== Accolades ===
List of awards and nominations
Award	Ceremony	Category	Recipient(s)	Result	Ref(s)
Screen Awards	4th Screen Awards	Screen Award for Best Actress	Madhuri Dixit	Won	
Screen Awards	4th Screen Awards	Screen Award for Best Supporting Actress	Shabana Azmi	Won	
Screen Awards	4th Screen Awards	Screen Award for Best Actor in a Negative Role	Mohan Joshi	Won	
