= Aaja Nachle =

2007 film by Anil Mehta

- Theatrical release poster
- Directed by: Anil Mehta
- Written by: Jaideep Sahni
- Story by: Aditya Chopra
- Produced by: Aditya Chopra
- Starring: Madhuri Dixit; Konkona Sen Sharma; Jugal Hansraj; Kunal Kapoor
- Cinematography: K. U. Mohanan
- Edited by: Ritesh Soni
- Music by: Salim–Sulaiman
- Production company: Yash Raj Films
- Distributed by: Yash Raj Films
- Release date: 30 November 2007
- Running time: 146 minutes
- Country: India
- Language: Hindi

Aaja Nachle (transl. Come, let's dance) is a 2007 Indian Hindi-language dance film directed by Anil Mehta in his directorial debut, and produced by Aditya Chopra under the banner of Yash Raj Films. The film stars Madhuri Dixit in her first acting role since Devdas (2002), alongside Konkona Sen Sharma, Jugal Hansraj, and Kunal Kapoor.

Aaja Nachle was released theatrically in India and the United States on 30 November 2007. It received mixed reviews from critics and was declared a "flop" by Box Office India.

At the 53rd Filmfare Awards, Aaja Nachle received two nominations: Best Actress (Dixit) and Best Female Playback Singer (Sunidhi Chauhan for "Aaja Nachle").

== Plot ==
A dancer from New York, Dia returns to her hometown Shamli after learning that her former dance teacher, Makarand "Masterji" Shukla, is seriously ill. She arrives after his death and discovers that the Ajanta Theatre, where Masterji trained local performers, is threatened with demolition. The local authorities consider the theatre a waste of valuable land.

With the help of Doctor, the caretaker of Ajanta, Dia decides to save the theatre by staging a theatrical production there. She is given two months to prove that the theatre is still important to the community, and all the performers must come from Shamli. The residents initially respond with mistrust and ridicule because Dia had left the town years earlier.

Dia recruits a group of inexperienced local performers, including Imran, a low-level enforcer; Anokhi, a local tomboy; Chaudhary Om Singh, a former MLA; Mohan Sharma, a tea-stall owner; Mr. Chojar, a government official; Sanjeev Mehta, an insurance agent; and Dhankuber, a town vagabond. The group must learn to work together despite their different personalities and backgrounds.

During rehearsals, the performers struggle with the production and frequently argue with one another. Dia faces opposition from local political figures and a powerful contractor who want the theatre demolished. She must also overcome the townspeople’s cynicism and regain their trust.

As rehearsals continue, the performers gradually gain confidence and discipline. The production brings together residents from different social backgrounds and revives interest in the abandoned theatre. Dia also confronts the memories and relationships connected to her past in Shamli.

On the night of the performance, the troupe stages the completed production at the Ajanta Theatre. The townspeople gather to watch the show, and the performers demonstrate that the theatre remains an important part of the community. Their performance helps Dia prevent the demolition of Ajanta and restore its place as a centre of local culture.

== Cast ==
- Madhuri Dixit as Dia Srivastav
- Konkona Sen Sharma as Anokhi Anokhelal / "Laila"
- Kunal Kapoor as Imran Pathan / "Majnu"
- Jugal Hansraj as Sanjay Mehra / "Tabrez" (Laila's brother)
- Divya Dutta as Najma, Dia's best friend / "Laila's mother"
- Ranvir Shorey as Mohan Sharma
- Akhilendra Mishra as Chaudhary Om Singh
- Vinay Pathak as Mr. Chojar
- Sushmita Mukherjee as Mrs. Chojar
- Yashpal Sharma as Inspector Sahib
- Nawazuddin Siddiqui as Dhan Kuber
- Raghubir Yadav as Doctor Sa'ab
- Asha Sachdev as Bindu
- Akshaye Khanna as MP Raja Uday Singh
- Irrfan Khan as Farooque, Najma's husband
- Darshan Jariwala as Guru Makarand
- Felix D'Alviella as Steve, Dia's love interest
- Dalai as Radha, Dia's daughter
- Vinod Nagpal as Mr. Srivastav
- Uttara Baokar as Mrs. Srivastav
- Divyendu Sharma as MLA's son

== Controversy ==
Upon its release, Aaja Nachle faced controversy over a line in the film's title song. The lyric, "Bole mochi bhi khud ko sunar hai" (Even the cobbler calls himself a goldsmith) sparked anger from Dalit groups who viewed the song as comparing lower-class communities with high-class communities.

The film was subsequently removed from screening in Uttar Pradesh, Haryana and Punjab and the leader of the Indian Justice Party, Udit Raj, held a demonstration in New Delhi. Eventually, Yash Raj Films apologized and deleted the lyrics.

== Music ==
Aaja Nachle

Studio album by Salim–Sulaiman
- Released: 16 August 2007 (India)
- Genre: Film soundtrack
- Length: 38:45
- Label: YRF Music
- Producer: Aditya Chopra

Salim–Sulaiman chronology
| Chak De India (2007) | Aaja Nachle (2007) | Roadside Romeo (2008) |

The film's music was composed by Salim–Sulaiman, with lyrics written by Jaideep Sahni and Piyush Mishra. It was released on 1 January 2004 by YRF Music.

The album debuted at number nine on Indian music charts in its opening week.

Track listing
| No. | Title | Lyrics | Singer(s) | Length |
|---|---|---|---|---|
| 1. | "Aaja Nachle" | Piyush Mishra | Sunidhi Chauhan | 5:04 |
| 2. | "Ishq Hua" | Jaideep Sahni | Sonu Nigam, Shreya Ghoshal | 4:24 |
| 3. | "Show Me Your Jalwa" | Jaideep Sahni | Kailash Kher, Richa Sharma, Salim Merchant | 4:13 |
| 4. | "O Re Piya" | Jaideep Sahni | Rahat Fateh Ali Khan, Sadhana Sargam | 6:20 |
| 5. | "Soniye Mil Ja" | Piyush Mishra | Sukhwinder Singh, Sunidhi Chauhan, Madhuri Dixit | 3:37 |
| 6. | "Is Pal" | Piyush Mishra | Sonu Nigam, Shreya Ghoshal | 3:59 |
| 7. | "Koi Patthar Se Na Maare" | Piyush Mishra | Sonu Nigam, Shreya Ghoshal, Sunidhi Chauhan | 4:04 |
| 8. | "Dance With Me" | Jaideep Sahni | Sonia Saigal | 3:39 |
| 9. | "Aaje Nachle (Reprise)" | Piyush Mishra | Sunidhi Chauhan, Marianne D'Cruz | 3:28 |

== Reception ==
=== Box office ===
Aaja Nachle opened to mixed responses. It collected ₹2.5 million (equivalent to ₹630 million or US$7.4 million in 2023) and was declared a commercial failure by Box Office India.

=== Critical reception ===
Rotten Tomatoes gives Aaja Nachle an approval rating of 67% based on 6 critic reviews.

Taran Adarsh of Bollywood Hungama wrote that the film was below mediocre doesn't meet up to expectations and called it "one of the major disappointments of the year". Hindustan Times film critic Khalid Mohamed said the film was "scripted with more potholes than you could find on a post-monsoon road". Raja Sen of Rediff.com called Aaje Nachle "a tragically half-baked film".

Rachel Saltz for the The New York Times described the character Dia as interesting but lacking the screenplay to "fully address or dramatize them".

Derek Elley wrote for Variety that the film was "not so much a comeback as a one-off special appearance".

== Accolades ==
| Award | Date of the ceremony | Category | Recipients | Result | Ref. |
|---|---|---|---|---|---|
| Stardust Awards | 26 January 2008 | Actor of the Year – Female | Madhuri Dixit | Nominated | |
| Stardust Awards | 26 January 2008 | Best Supporting Actor | Akshaye Khanna | Nominated | |
| Filmfare Awards | 16 February 2008 | Best Actress | Madhuri Dixit | Nominated | |
| Filmfare Awards | 16 February 2008 | Best Female Playback Singer | Sunidhi Chauhan (for "Aaja Nachle") | Nominated | |
| Annual Central European Bollywood Awards | 8 March 2008 | Best Actress | Madhuri Dixit | Nominated | |
| Producers Guild Film Awards | 30 March 2008 | Best Female Playback Singer | Sunidhi Chauhan (for "Aaja Nachle") | Nominated | |
| IIFA Awards | 6–8 June 2008 | Best Female Playback Singer | Sunidhi Chauhan (for "Aaja Nachle") | Nominated | |
| IIFA Awards | 6–8 June 2008 | Best Choreography | Vaibhavi Merchant (for "Aaja Nachle") | Won | |
