= Yaraana (1995 film) =

1995 Indian film by David Dhawan

- Poster
- Directed by: David Dhawan
- Written by: Reema Rakesh Nath
- Produced by: Yusuf Bhatt; Reema Rakesh Nath
- Starring: Rishi Kapoor; Madhuri Dixit; Raj Babbar
- Cinematography: Rajan Kinagi
- Edited by: A. Muthu
- Music by: Anu Malik
- Distributed by: Samna Films
- Release date: 20 October 1995
- Running time: 126 mins
- Country: India
- Language: Hindi
- Budget: ₹4.75 crore
- Box office: ₹9.08 crore

Yaraana (transl. "Friendship") is a 1995 Bollywood romantic thriller film directed by David Dhawan and starring Rishi Kapoor, Madhuri Dixit, Raj Babbar, Shakti Kapoor, Kader Khan. It is loosely based on the American film Sleeping with the Enemy, starring Julia Roberts. The film is known for the song "Mera Piya Ghar Aaya".

At the 41st Filmfare Awards, Yaraana won Best Female Playback Singer for Kavita Krishnamurthy (for "Mera Piya Ghar Aaya"), in addition to a Best Actress nomination for Madhuri Dixit.

== Plot ==
Lalita catches the eye of JB and he immediately falls in love with her and decides that he must have her. Her uncle Madhi arranges for them to get married but he is only doing this because JB is paying him to. When she refuses the matrimonial alliance, JB kidnaps her and keeps her at his home until the day of the wedding. She is literally watched over by JB every day in case she tries to escape. On the day of the wedding, Lalita faints and uses this to escape. She also moves her mother away and barely escapes JB who assumes that she has been killed after he saw her being hit by a car. In fact, Lalita swapped her wedding attire with another woman, so the lady that JB saw being hit by the car was not Lalita.

Lalita escapes the city and meets Raj who at first she uses as a cover but they both fall in love with each other. She uses the name Shikha instead of her name. Raj's grandfather, Rai Saheb is happy that his grandson wants to marry Shikha and he arranges their wedding. Unfortunately, JB finds out that Lalita is still alive through her mother and quickly traces her. JB tells Raj and his grandfather who Lalita really is with the help of her devious uncle. Lalita is taken away and is forced to be a dutiful wife, which in JB's terms means that she has to stay with him forever. In the end Raj kills JB when the latter trying to kill Lalita and both Raj and Lalita get married and they live happily ever after.

== Cast ==
- Rishi Kapoor as Raj
- Madhuri Dixit as Lalita / Shikha
- Raj Babbar as JB / Inspector Pradhan
- Shakti Kapoor as Banke
- Kader Khan as Rai Sahib
- Tej Sapru as Madanlal "Madhi"
- Anil Dhawan as Dr. Rashid
- Satish Kaul as Inspector
- Vikas Anand as Sheru, Father of Girl Who Dies In Accident
- Brij Gopal as Man Who Brought Mangoes for JB
- Dina Pathak as Durga
- Sulabha Deshpande as Mrs. D'Souza
- Sadashiv Amrapurkar as Beggar / Mungerilal (Special appearance)
- Himani Shivpuri as Beggar / Champa (Special appearance)
- David Dhawan as Cyclist in Jadoo Jadoo song (Uncredited)

== Awards ==
41st Filmfare Awards:

Won

- Best Female Playback Singer – Kavita Krishnamurthy for "Mera Piya Ghar Aaya"

Nominated

- Best Actress – Madhuri Dixit

== Soundtrack ==
Yaraana

Soundtrack album by Anu Malik
- Released: 20 October 1995
- Recorded: 1995
- Genre: Feature film soundtrack
- Length: 43:06
- Language: Hindi
- Label: Zee Music Company

Official audio
- Yaraana- Full Album on YouTube

The music was composed by Anu Malik with lyrics written by Rahat Indori, Anwar Sagar, Rani Malik & Maya Govind. The songs are sung by Kavita Krishnamurthy, Udit Narayan, Sapna Mukherjee, Vinod Rathod.

Song	Singer
"Aaja Aaja Maahi"	Kavita Krishnamurthy
"Noorani Chehrewale"	Kavita Krishnamurthy
"Mera Piya Ghar Aaya"	Kavita Krishnamurthy
"Jane Woh Kaisa Chor"	Kavita Krishnamurthy
"Mohabbat Ke Nazar-E-Karam Chahta Hoon"	Kavita Krishnamurthy, Vinod Rathod
"Rabbi Re Ralli, Gulaab Ki Kali Dil Churake Mera"	Kavita Krishnamurthy, Udit Narayan
"Jaadu Jaadu Jaadu"	Sapna Mukherjee, Udit Narayan
