= Raja (1995 film) =

1995 Indian film by Indra Kumar

- Promotional Poster
- Directed by: Indra Kumar
- Written by: Tanveer Khan (dialogues)
- Screenplay by: Rajeev Kaul; Praful Parekh
- Story by: Naushir Khatau (story advisor)
- Produced by: Indra Kumar; Ashok Thakeria
- Starring: Madhuri Dixit; Sanjay Kapoor; Paresh Rawal
- Cinematography: Baba Azmi
- Edited by: Hussain A. Burmawala
- Music by: Nadeem-Shravan
- Production company: Maruti International
- Release date: 2 June 1995 (India)
- Running time: 168 minutes
- Country: India
- Language: Hindi
- Budget: ₹ 4.25 crore
- Box office: ₹ 34.68 crore

Raja (transl. King) is a 1995 Indian Hindi-language action romantic drama film directed and co-produced by Indra Kumar and starring Madhuri Dixit and Sanjay Kapoor, Paresh Rawal, Mukesh Khanna, Dalip Tahil, Rita Bhaduri and Himani Shivpuri appear in supporting roles. The film was released on 2 June 1995 and was a commercial blockbuster.

The huge success of the film was attributed to Dixit for her performance, earning her the Screen Award for Best Actress. At the 41st Filmfare Awards, the film received 11 nominations, including Best Film, Best Director (Kumar), Best Actress (Dixit), Best Supporting Actor (Rawal) and Best Supporting Actress (Bhaduri). The film was remade into Bengali in Bangladesh in 2002 as Chorom Opoman starring Manna and Eka.

== Plot ==
The Garewal brothers, Rana Mahendra and Vishwa, are good friends with the rich Birju Patangwala, and arrange their 9-year-old sister Madhu's marriage with Birju's 10-year-old brother Raja; both become friends. As Birju loses all his wealth in a fire at his factory, Rana and Vishwa break the marriage. Shocked, Birju tries to stop them but is electrocuted by accident. He stays on the city outskirts with Raja, caring for him by doing petty jobs.

=== 15 years later ===
Grown-up, Madhu meets and falls in love with Raja. Their love for each other deepens when Madhu learns that Raja is, in fact, her own childhood friend. Vishwa and Rana are determined to keep them away. Rana pretends to accept him and invites Birju to stay with him, getting one of their assistants dressed up like Birju. The assistant enters Madhu's room at night, trying to rape her. She duly screams that Birju is trying to rape her. The assistant quickly escapes; the room is dimly lit before Madhu can see his face.

Raja returns and is asked to believe Madhu or Birju. He believes Birju and breaks up with Madhu. Later, Raja gets hold of the assistant and extracts a confession. But he gets critically injured in an accident. Rana's wife, Sumitra, reveals the truth about Birju's innocence to Madhu. Shocked that her own brothers set up her rape, Madhu leaves to go to Raja. Rana realizes his mistakes and begs forgiveness, but Vishwa attacks them. Raja comes and saves them, marrying Madhu in front of everybody. Vishwa too feels sorry for his deeds. Raja and Madhu will forgive all only if they bless their marriage.

== Cast ==
- Sanjay Kapoor as Raja Patangwala, Birju's younger brother.
- Madhuri Dixit as Madhu Garewal
- Paresh Rawal as Brijnath "Birju" Patangwala, Raja's elder brother.
- Rita Bhaduri as Sumitra Garewal
- Mukesh Khanna as Rana Mahendra Pratap Garewal
- Dalip Tahil as Vishwa Garewal
- Tiku Talsania as Shantipati
- Himani Shivpuri as Kaki
- Dinesh Hingoo as Rongala
- Veeru Krishnan as neighbour
- Mushtaq Khan as Banwarilal
- Adi Irani as Abhishek Sanyal
- Sudhir as Police Inspector
- Maqsood as Party Guest
- Sunil Dhawan as Anti-Corruption Officer
- Surendra Rahi as Party guest
- Kedarnath Saigal as in the crowd
- Yasmin as a party guest
- Chacha Chaudhary as the old man trying to kiss Madhu
- Chhaya as a party guest
- Harjeet Walia as Natwar, the impostor who frames Birju

== Soundtrack ==
The songs were composed by Nadeem-Shravan, while the lyrics were penned by Sameer. The album went on to become the second most sold Bollywood album of 1995. Nadeem-Shravan, for this album also received the Special Award London (UK). The song "Nazrein Mili Dil Dhadka" was inspired by the Come September theme song performed by Billy Vaughan and his orchestra. The tune of "Akhiyan Milaoon" was inspired from the Bangladeshi song "Ami Tomay Bhalobashi" from Andha Prem (1993), composed by Ahmed Imtiaz Bulbul. According to the Indian trade website Box Office India, with around 35,00,000 units sold the soundtrack became the second highest-selling album of the year.

#	Title	Singer(s)	Length
1.	"Akhiyaan Milaoon Kabhi"	Udit Narayan, Alka Yagnik	06:16
2.	"Kisi Din Banoongi Main"	Udit Narayan, Alka Yagnik	07:20
3.	"Phool Maangu Na Bahaar"	Udit Narayan, Alka Yagnik	05:21
4.	"Nazrein Mili Dil Dhadka"	Udit Narayan, Alka Yagnik	05:32
5.	"Tumne Agar Pyar Se"	Alka Yagnik	05:43
6.	"Aankh Milate Darr Lagta Hai"	Udit Narayan, Alka Yagnik	07:20
7.	"Ja Sajna Tujhko Bhula"	Udit Narayan, Alka Yagnik	06:15
8.	"Aankh Teri Chalke Toh"	Udit Narayan, Alka Yagnik	07:10
9.	"Tumne Agar Pyar Se" (Male)	Udit Narayan	05:43
10.	"Vada Jo Kiya"	Roop Kumar Rathod	02:10

== Awards and nominations ==
41st Filmfare Awards:

Category	Nominees	Results
Best Film	Indra Kumar	Nominated
Best Director	Indra Kumar	Nominated
Best Actress	Madhuri Dixit	Nominated
Best Supporting Actor	Paresh Rawal	Nominated
Best Supporting Actress	Rita Bhaduri	Nominated
Best Music Director	Nadeem-Shravan	Nominated
Best Female Playback Singer	Alka Yagnik for "Akhiyaan Milaun Kabhi"	Nominated

1996 Screen Awards:

Category	Nominees	Results
Best Actress	Madhuri Dixit	Won
Best Supporting Actor	Paresh Rawal	Won
