= Prem Pratigyaa =

- Promotional Poster
- Directed by: Bapu
- Written by: Jainendra Jain
- Based on: Vandichakkaram (Tamil) by K. Vijayan
- Produced by: B. Loganathan
- Starring: Mithun Chakraborty; Madhuri Dixit
- Cinematography: Baba Azmi
- Edited by: Anil Malnad
- Music by: Bappi Lahiri
- Release date: 19 May 1989
- Country: India
- Language: Hindi

Prem Pratigyaa (transl. Promise of Love) is a 1989 Indian Hindi-language romantic drama film starring Mithun Chakraborty and Madhuri Dixit. The film is directed by Bapu and written by Jainendra Jain. The film was a remake of the Tamil film Vandichakkaram and was a commercial success.

At the 35th Filmfare Awards, Dixit received a nomination for Best Actress for her performance in the film.

== Plot ==
Raja and his friend Charan come to a city to make a living. After failing to secure a job, one day, they are teased and ragged by Kallu Dada. The quarrel gets physical, and Raja wins. As a result, Raja becomes the local underworld don and starts collecting protection money from shopkeepers. He also becomes an alcoholic. Raja meets with Laxmi and is attracted to her. He comes to her assistance when her father, Mohan, passes away by helping to cremate him; he comes to her aid again when Kallu and his goons attempt to molest her; and when the municipality tears down her hut, he decides to let her live with him. Due to her influence, he gives up his bad habits. As things go well, they both decide to get married. But on the wedding day, Laxmi's old beau, a Professor, shows up and proposes marriage to her. Meanwhile, Raja went chaotic by thinking he needs to sacrifice Laxmi. Raja is also arrested and held for killing Kallu. The court sentences Raja to 5 years' imprisonment. At the end of 5 years, Raja exits the jail. He finds Professor Laxmi and Charan waiting for him. He gestures to Laxmi, asking if she is married to the Professor. She slaps him lightly, then kisses him, and they reunite.

== Cast ==
- Mithun Chakraborty as Raja
- Madhuri Dixit as Laxmi
- Vinod Mehra as Professor
- Satish Kaushik as Charan
- Deven Verma as Hair Oil Salesman / Burglar
- Aruna Irani as Thief
- Ranjeet as Kallu Dada
- Nilu Phule as Mohan "Daddu"

== Soundtrack ==
The music of the film is composed by Bappi Lahiri on lyrics written by Indeevar.

Song	Singer
"Sheeshe Ki Umar Pyale Ki"	Kishore Kumar
"Bahon Mein Botal, Botal Mein Daru, Daru Mein Meri Nasha"	Kishore Kumar, Asha Bhosle
"Na Janun Ram"	Asha Bhosle
"Pyar Kabhi Kam Nahi Karna, Koi Sitam Kar Lena"	Asha Bhosle, Bappi Lahiri
"Chalna Hai Tera Kaam" (Happy)	Bappi Lahiri
"Chalna Hai Tera Kaam" (Sad)	Bappi Lahiri

== Awards ==
35th Filmfare Awards:

Nominated

- Best Actress – Madhuri Dixit
