= A Film by Aravind =

2005 film by Sekhar Suri

- Directed by: Sekhar Suri
- Written by: Story & Screenplay: Sekhar Suri; Dialogues: Surendra Krishna
- Produced by: Maroju Sridhar Rao; K. S. Rama Rao (Presenter)
- Starring: Rajiv Kanakala; Rishi; Sherlyn Chopra; Ghazal Srinivas
- Cinematography: Ramesh Krishna
- Music by: Vijay Kurakula
- Distributed by: Sridhar Cinema
- Release date: 9 July 2005
- Country: India
- Language: Telugu
- Budget: ₹1.8 crore

A Film by Aravind is a 2005 Indian Telugu-language horror thriller film written and directed by Sekhar Suri. The film features Rajeev Kanakala, Rishi, Sherlyn Chopra, and Ghazal Srinivas in key roles. The story follows Aravind, a filmmaker, and his childhood friend Rishi, a movie star, on a road trip to a remote guesthouse to finish an unfinished script. Things take a dark turn when they meet a mysterious woman, and events from the script start happening in real life, blurring fiction and reality.

A Film by Aravind received positive reviews and was a commercial success. It was also dubbed into Hindi as Bhayanak: A Murder Mystery. The film was followed by a spiritual sequel, Aravind 2, released in 2013.

== Plot ==
Childhood friends Aravind and Rishi, both passionate about filmmaking, initially struggle to gain recognition in the industry. Their breakthrough arrives when Aravind directs two blockbuster films starring Rishi, cementing their success. For their next project, Aravind seeks a fresh concept and invites submissions from new writers. While reviewing the scripts, one catches his eye—a script by a new writer, though smudged with ink after the 60th page. Intrigued, Aravind asks his assistant to track down the writer. Motivated by the story, Aravind and Rishi go on a road trip to a remote guesthouse, hoping to find inspiration to finish the script for their third film.

During the journey, Aravind and Rishi encounter Nirupama, a young woman, and rescue her from a group of goons. While traveling together, Nirupama asks Rishi to overtake a "black car" ahead of them. Rishi complies, speeding past the vehicle, unaware that it is later struck by a truck. Oblivious to the accident, they continue their journey. As they stay at a cottage, Rishi begins to fall for Nirupama, only for Aravind to develop feelings for her as well. They soon realise that the events unfolding closely resemble the plot of the partially read script, which foretells two friends clashing over a woman—a prophecy that begins to come true.

Aravind calls the scriptwriter to the woods and urges him to finish the story. The writer reveals that the woman the friends are fighting over is a psychopath and will kill one of them. Fearing for their lives, Aravind warns Rishi to stay away from Nirupama, but Rishi dismisses his concerns, determined to elope with her. Soon after, Aravind learns of a psychopath in the area, which reinforces his suspicion that Nirupama may be the one he was warned about.

Aravind plans to kill Nirupama to save Rishi, but the scriptwriter unexpectedly alters the story's climax, turning it from a thriller to a romantic tale. As the script changes, reality shifts as well, with Rishi surviving, but Aravind being killed by the psychopath (the one mentioned in the news earlier). It is revealed that the psychopath was in the "black car" that collided with a truck during the race. She blamed Rishi and his friends for the accident and sought revenge. After witnessing his friend's death, Rishi confronts the psychopath and ultimately kills her.

== Cast ==
- Rajeev Kanakala as Aravind
- Rishi as Rishi
- Sherlyn Chopra as Nirupama "Niru"
- Ghazal Srinivas as Satyam
- Mallikarjuna Rao as Dhaba Owner
- Madhu as Housekeeper
- Mansoor Markhand

== Production ==
A Film by Aravind was directed by Sekhar Suri, who had previously helmed Adrustam (2004), which faced commercial failure. Undeterred, Suri sought to make his mark in the slasher-thriller genre with A Film by Aravind.

The film was produced by M. Sridhar Rao and presented by K. S. Rama Rao. Suri took on a central role in the film, contributing to the story, screenplay, and direction. His vision for the film was to create a unique horror-thriller experience, deviating from the typical commercial norms of Telugu cinema and expanding the genre's boundaries. The film was made on a budget of ₹1.8 crore.

== Music ==
The background score for A Film by Aravind was composed by Vijay Kurakula. The audio was released 40 days after the film's theatrical release, on 21 August 2005, at a Music World outlet in Hyderabad. Actor Rajasekhar launched the audio and presented the first cassette to K. S. Rama Rao. Aditya Music acquired the audio rights for the film.

The soundtrack consists of only one song, with the rest being instrumental tracks.

== Reception ==
=== Critical response ===
Jeevi of Idlebrain.com rated A Film by Aravind 3/5, praising the director's grip on the screenplay and the first half's intriguing pace, but critiquing the film's second half and the unconvincing climax. Jalapathy Gudelli of Telugucinema.com commended the film's technical aspects, including strong cinematography and re-recording, but found the plot illogical, the climax weak, and the scare tactics forced. Malini Mannath of Chennai Online reviewed the Tamil dubbed version as an engaging thriller with suspenseful twists, strong performances, and a captivating narrative.

=== Box office ===
The film was a commercial success. A 100-day function was held at the Film Nagar Cultural Club in Hyderabad on the night of 6 November 2005.
