= Prateeksha =

1993 film by Lawrence D'Souza

- Theatrical release poster
- Directed by: Lawrence D'Souza
- Written by: Talat Rekhi; Indeevar; Prayag Raaj (lyrics)
- Produced by: S. Ramanathan
- Starring: Jeetendra; Moushumi Chatterjee; Govinda; Shilpa Shirodkar
- Cinematography: Lawrence D'Souza
- Edited by: A. Paul Durai Singham
- Music by: Rajesh Roshan
- Production company: Raam Raj Kala Mandhir
- Release date: 7 May 1993
- Running time: 132 mins
- Country: India
- Language: Hindi

Prateeksha (transl. Waiting) is a 1993 Indian Hindi-language drama film, produced by S. Ramanathan and directed by Lawrence D'Souza. A remake of Chiranjeet Chakraborty starrer Bengali film Sindoor (1991), it stars Jeetendra, Moushumi Chatterjee, Govinda, and Shilpa Shirodkar with music composed by Rajesh Roshan.

== Plot ==
Vijay is a very talented dancer who conducts programs along with his wife Laxmi and buddy Tom D’Costa. A malignant businessman Dinesh Khanna organizes Vijay’s show in London and tries to molest Laxmi. Fortunately, Vijay returns but gets killed by Dinesh while protecting Laxmi. Tom becomes crippled. Laxmi is sent to prison for a crime.

Years roll by. Raja uses the skill gifted by his parents and becomes a street dancer. Laxmi is released from prison. They find Tom who is a street beggar and restart their troupe. An organizer spots Raja and enrolls him in a competition that he wins. Raja challenges a naughty girl (Renu) and it develops into mutual love. Renu is the daughter of Dinesh. Laxmi does not reveal past identities fearing for Raja's safety. Dinesh discovers Raja is Vijay's son and conspires to eliminate him. Tom tragically dies while guarding Raja. Laxmi finally reveals the past. Raja goes after Dinesh. The movie ends on a happy note with Raja continuing his musical journey.

== Cast ==
- Jeetendra as Vijay Kumar
- Moushumi Chatterjee as Laxmi V Kumar
- Govinda as Raja V Kumar
- Shilpa Shirodkar as Renu Khanna
- Vinod Mehra as Tom D'Costa
- Danny Denzongpa as Dinesh Khanna
- Tej Sapru as Pratap
- Vikas Anand as Anand
- Master Bunty as Young Raja

== Soundtrack ==
#	Title	Singer(s)
1	"Aao Duniya Ke Paar Chalein"	Mohammad Aziz, Sadhna Sargam
2	"Are Naachein Aaj To"	Kumar Sanu
3	"O Meri Maa"	Amit Kumar
4	"Meet Mere Mere Ye Geet"	Mohammad Aziz
5	"Sukh Hai To Gana Hai"	Mohammad Aziz, Anuradha Paudwal, Boney
6	"Doston Aaj Sur Aur Taal"	Kumar Sanu, Boney, Govinda
7	"Om Shanti Om"	Anwar
8	"Hua Haseen Ho Tohfa"	Anuradha Paudwal, Sudesh Bhonsle
9	"Sukh Hai To Gana Hai" (Sad)	Mohammad Aziz
