= Sekhar Suri =

Indian film director

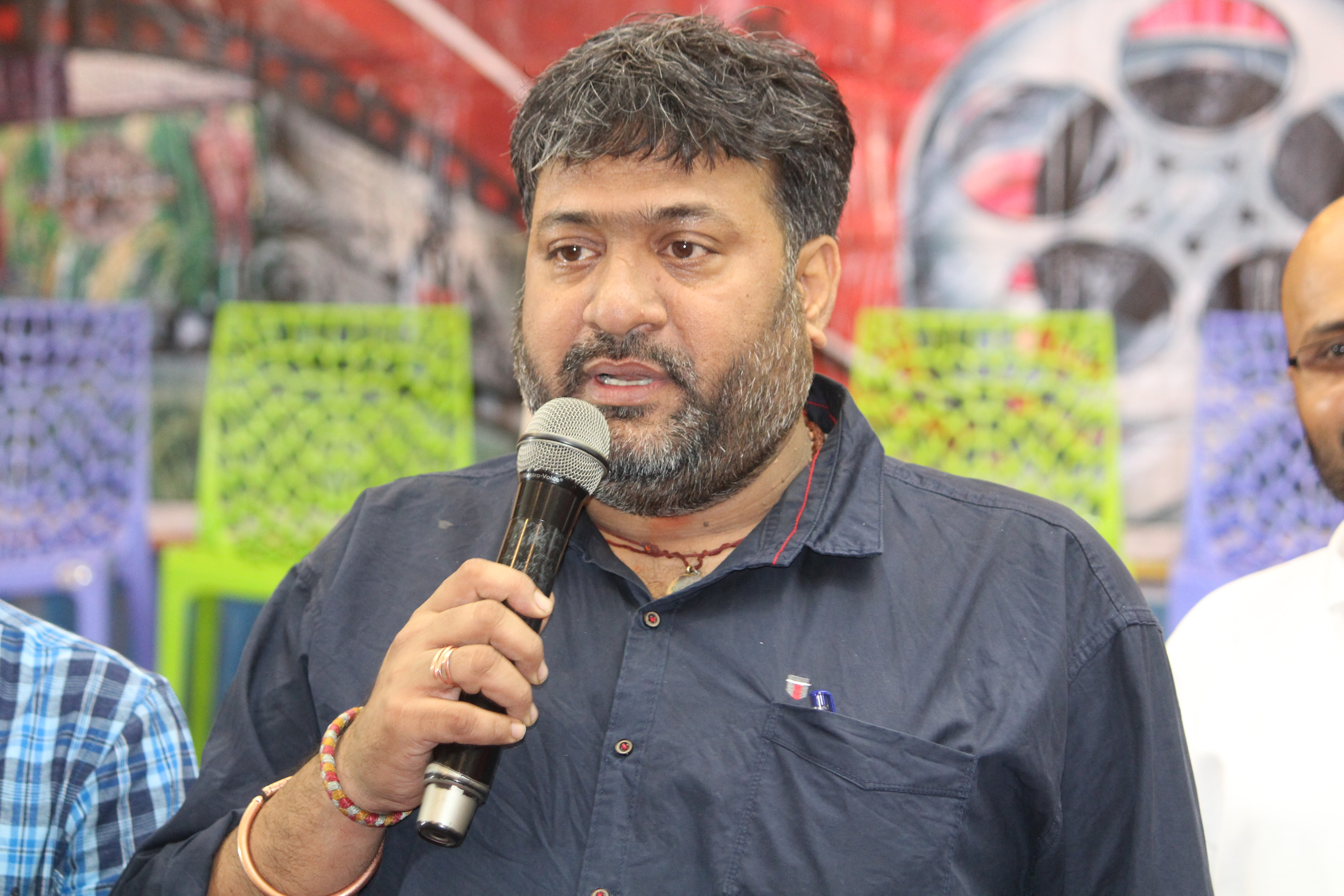
- Suri in Cinivaram
- Born: SS Chandra Sekhar; Tanuku, West Godavari district, Andhra Pradesh
- Occupation: Film director
- Relatives: Mohana Krishna Indraganti (cousin)

S. S. Chandra Shekhar, popularly known as Sekhar Suri, is an Indian film director primarily working in Telugu cinema. Best known for the thriller A Film by Aravind (2005), he has directed four Telugu films and one Hindi film, all of which prominently feature elements of suspense and intrigue.

== Personal life ==
Sekhar was born in Tanuku, West Godavari district of Andhra Pradesh. He used to watch a lot of TV series as a kid. God father was his favorite series on Doordarshan. This obsession continued till his graduation. He spent most of his early life in Hyderabad. He discontinued his degree in commerce to become a film maker.

His original name is SS Chandra Sekhar. Since Chandra Sekhar is a very common name in the film industry, he changed his name to Sekhar Suri. Telugu film director Mohana Krishna Indraganti is his cousin.

== Career ==
He happened to meet actor Tarun on an occasion with the help of his friend. With the help of Tarun, he got a chance to meet the owner of Super Good Films. This way he got a chance to direct Tarun for the film Adrustam. The script of the film was loosely based on Roman Holiday. However, the film did not do well at the box office.

Later he prepared the script on his own and made it into a film A Film by Aravind starring Rajeev Kanakala, Richard Rishi, and Mona Chopra in the lead roles. This film became a hit. Rishi had bagged seven films after this film. Next he made a psychological thriller film Three which was a real life incident happened in Hyderabad. This film received critical response. Next he made a film Aravind 2 starring Srinivas Avasarala, Kamal Kamaraju and others.

He worked on the Hindi film Guns of Banaras with Karan Nath.

== Filmography ==
- Adrustam (2002)
- A Film by Aravind (2005)
- Three (2008)
- Aravind 2 (2013)
- Dr Charkravarthy (2017)
- Guns of Banaras (2020) (Hindi)
