= Sudhakar Bokade =

Indian film producer

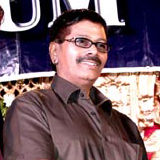
- Bokade in 2013
- Died: 7 July 2013 (aged 57); Mumbai, Maharashtra, India
- Occupation: Film producer
- Years active: 1990–1996, 2013
- Children: 3

Sudhakar Bokade was an Indian film producer predominantly working in Bollywood film industry. He produced popular films like Prahaar (1991), Saajan (1991), Dhanwaan (1993) and more. He was considered as a "big name" in mid-1990s in the Bollywood film industry.

== Personal life ==
On 6 July 2013, he was admitted to Kokilaben Dhirubhai Ambani Hospital for breathing problems. He died the next day after suffering a heart attack. He has two daughters and one son.

== Career ==
Starting his career in 1990, Bokade produced various Hindi films. In 1990, two films produced by him, Izzatdaar and Nyay Anyay were released. The films had a budget of ₹ 20 million and ₹ 10 million respectively, but they both flopped at the box office. Izzatdaar had actors Govinda, Dilip Kumar and Madhuri Dixit playing the lead roles.

In 1991, he produced the romantic drama film Saajan with Sanjay Dutt, Salman Khan and Madhuri Dixit playing the main roles. The film proved to be the highest grosser of the year at the box office and was declared a "Super Hit". It also ranked in top 10 grossers of the years 1990 to 1994. Along with commercial success, the film also won 2 Filmfare Awards at the 37th Filmfare Awards among 11 nominations. As the producer, he was nominated for the Best Film award, but did not win. After the commercial success of the film, he produced the film Prahaar. Directed by Nana Patekar, the film had Patekar, Madhuri Dixit and Dimple Kapadia playing lead roles. In 1992, he produced Sapne Sajan Ke directed by Lawrence D'Souza, who had previously directed Saajan. But the film failed to achieve the success that their previous project did. His many successful films gave him a "big name" as a Bollywood film producer.

Later Bokade went on to produce various films, including some Marathi also. His project titled Kalinga, a multistarrer film directed by Dilip Kumar remained incomplete due to financial problems that he faced then. The film was Kumar's first directorial venture. At the time of his death in July 2013, Bokade was returning to the film industry, after a hiatus of 15 years, with a film titled Supermodel starring Rajeev Khandelwal, Veena Malik and Ashmit Patel.

== Filmography ==
Year	Title	Notes
1990	Izzatdaar	
1990	Nyay Anyay	
1991	Saajan	Nominated – Filmfare Award for Best Film
1991	Prahaar: The Final Attack	
1991	Patli Re Patli	Marathi film
1992	Sapne Sajan Ke	
1993	Dhanwaan	
1993	Kanyadaan	
1995	Sauda	
	Mailek	Marathi film
	Padkaar	Marathi film
1996	Kalinga	Incomplete
2000	Yeh Pyaar Hi Toh Hai	
2009	Sanam Teri Kasam	Delayed release
	Supermodel	Under production
