= Jividha Sharma =

Indian film and television actress

- Born: Delhi, India
- Occupation: Actress
- Years active: 1998–2019
- Known for: Tum Bin Jaaoon Kahaan

Jividha Sharma is an Indian actress known for her work in Hindi and Punjabi film industries.

== Biography ==
Born to a Delhi-based Punjabi family, Sharma made her film debut in the Tamil language romance Kaadhale Nimmadhi (1998). The next year, she played a supporting role in Subhash Ghai's musical drama Taal (1999). Her breakthrough came with the romantic action film Yeh Dil Aashiqanaa (2002). Directed by Kuku Kohli, it featured Sharma playing a terrorist's sister opposite Karan Nath. Rediff.com's reviewer wrote that she had "done a good job". That same year she played the lead role in Telugu film Yuva Rathna. A critic wrote for The Hindu that except the last few scenes, Sharma was "lifeless throughout". Full Hyderabad's reviewer noted that she was "one of those assembly-line heroines for Tollywood". A Hindi film Sila with her in the lead role was announced but never completed.

Mini Punjab (2009) marked Sharma's debut in Punjabi films and she was paired with Gurdas Maan. She followed this with The Lion of Punjab (2011), Yaar Annmulle (2011), Dil Sada Luteya Gaya (2013) and Dil Le Gayi Kudi Punjab Di (2015). The latter, a romantic film had her paired opposite Ashmit Patel.

Aruna Irani, the producer of Yeh Dil Aashiqanaa, cast Sharma for her TV serials Tum Bin Jaaoon Kahaan and Zameen Se Aasman Tak. The former was well received and dealt with the topic of life after death.

== Filmography ==
Year	Film	Role	Language
1998	Kaadhale Nimmadhi	Kavita	Tamil
1999	Taal	Ilavati Manhuja	Hindi
2002	Yeh Dil Aashiqanaa	Pooja Verma	Hindi
2002	Yuva Rathna	Sandhya	Telugu
2009	Mini Punjab	Simran	Punjabi
2011	The Lion of Punjab	Jassi	Punjabi
2011	Yaar Annmulle	Simarpreet Dhillon	Punjabi
2013	Dil Sada Luteya Gaya		Punjabi
2016	Mohenjo Daro	Rami	Hindi
2019	Phir Ussi Mod Par	Naaz	Hindi

=== Television ===
Year	Serial	Role
2003	Tum Bin Jaaoon Kahaan	Muskaan Mathur
2004	Zameen Se Aassman Tak	
2008	Doli Saja Ke	Diya
