= Aarzoo =

- DVD cover
- Directed by: Lawrence D'Souza
- Story by: Reema Rakesh Nath
- Produced by: Vikas Mohan
- Starring: Akshay Kumar; Madhuri Dixit; Saif Ali Khan; Paresh Rawal; Amrish Puri
- Cinematography: Lawrence D'Souza
- Edited by: R Rajendran
- Music by: Songs: Anu Malik; Background Score: Surinder Sodhi
- Production company: Dayavanti Pictures
- Release date: 19 March 1999
- Country: India
- Language: Hindi
- Budget: ₹5 crore
- Box office: ₹9 crore

Aarzoo (transl. Desire) is a 1999 Indian Hindi-language romantic action film directed by Lawrence D'Souza starring Akshay Kumar, Madhuri Dixit, Saif Ali Khan, Amrish Puri, Paresh Rawal and Reema Lagoo. The film was primarily filmed in Mumbai, but some scenes were filmed in London and Edinburgh. The film was remade in Bengali as O Priya Tumi Kothay (2002).

== Plot ==
Dayashankar (Amrish Puri) is a wealthy NRI living in London with his wife Parvati and daughter Pooja (Madhuri Dixit), who is the apple of his eye. Dayashankar also takes care of his deceased best friend's son Amar (Saif Ali Khan), who he regards as a surrogate son, and has always wished that he eventually marry Pooja. Studying in Edinburgh, Amar is overjoyed when he is invited to stay with Dayashankar's family in London. He eagerly prepares for his meeting with Pooja, with whom he has shared his childhood, and plans to ask her father for her hand in marriage as soon as possible.

However, Pooja has other plans – she has fallen in love with Vijay Khanna (Akshay Kumar), a pilot and plans to marry him. This bitterly disappoints Dayashankar, as he has already tacitly promised Amar that he would marry Pooja. After some convincing from Parvati and Amar, who have decided to give up on marrying Pooja, Dayashankar agrees to his daughter's wishes. Though heartbroken, Amar puts on a brave face during Vijay and Pooja's engagement and subsequent marriage.

However, tragedy strikes soon afterward as Vijay is declared dead in an aviation accident. Consequently, Pooja becomes a widow and becomes severely depressed; to make matters worse, she finds out she is pregnant with Vijay's child. Her father tells her to abort the child, with the fear of society looking down upon their family, and claims they will call her son a "bastard". Amar then tells Pooja he will take the responsibility to marry her and give the child his name. Amar willingly accepts this marriage and takes on the role of father to Pooja's baby boy. When Pooja realises that Amar has always loved her, she begins to reciprocate his feelings.

In a twist of fate, after a few years, the police reveal that Vijay is very much alive, and after his recovery, he goes back to the UK to reclaim Pooja. Pooja is overjoyed to see him, but when Vijay sees that Pooja is happily married to Amar, he misunderstands the situation and believes societal rumours about Amar – that he had planned Vijay's aviation accident so that he could marry Pooja. Vijay becomes so hostile towards Amar that he gangs up with Kailashnath, an old enemy of Amar's father who had killed him, and sets out for revenge by setting fire to Amar's factories and kidnapping Pooja's son, not knowing that the boy is his own son. Even though Pooja attempts to explain that she married Amar in order to give her child a father figure, Vijay continues to believe in the rumours about Amar. Dayashankar reveals that he plotted the murder of Vijay to Pooja and Amar, who are extremely shocked.

Vijay, Dayashankar, and Amar cook up a plan to protect the safety of Vijay's son, Rahul, from Kailashnath. When they all finally get near Kailashnath and his gang, Kailashnath shoots Amar multiple times, but Amar uses his body as a shield to protect the child, whereupon Dayashankar intervenes to shoot Kailashnath to death. Amar slowly passes away, surrounded by a sobbing Pooja, a regretful Vijay, their rescued son, and a saddened Dayashankar. Pooja and Vijay reconcile and honour Amar after his death.

== Cast ==
- Madhuri Dixit as Pooja
- Akshay Kumar as Vijay Khanna
- Saif Ali Khan as Amar
- Amrish Puri as Dayashankar (Pooja’s father)
- Paresh Rawal as Kailashnath
- Aruna Irani as Lucy (Vijay’s adopted mother)
- Reema Lagoo as Parvati (Pooja's mother)
- Laxmikant Berde as Laxmi Tripathi
- Tej Sapru as Balraj Nath
- Mukesh Rishi as CL Mishra
- Mohan Joshi as Rajpal
- Yunus Parvez as Fisherman Saxena
- Anil Nagarth as Naidu Nath

== Soundtrack ==
Aarzoo

Soundtrack album by Anu Malik
- Released: 10 December 1998
- Genre: Feature film soundtrack
- Label: Saregama

The music was composed by Anu Malik, and the lyrics were penned by Anand Bakshi.

=== Track listing ===
No.	Title	Lyrics	Singer(s)	Length
1.	"Ab Tere Dil Mein To"	Anand Bakshi	Kumar Sanu & Alka Yagnik	8:20
2.	"Sajan Sajan Teri Dulhan"	Anand Bakshi	Alka Yagnik	7:20
3.	"Mil Jaate Hain"	Anand Bakshi	Kumar Sanu & Alka Yagnik	7:13
4.	"Main Aa Rahan Hoon Wapas"	Anand Bakshi	Udit Narayan	6:27
5.	"Rabba Rabba I Love You"	Anand Bakshi	Sonu Nigam	6:26
6.	"Jai Mata Di"	Anand Bakshi	Sonu Nigam	8:46
7.	"Dosti Karte Nahin"	Anand Bakshi	Kumar Sanu, Udit Narayan & Alka Yagnik	6:43
8.	"Tu Soni Kudi"	Anand Bakshi	Udit Narayan & Anu Malik	6:21

== Reception ==
K. N. Vijiyan of New Straits Times wrote that "The attraction in this movie is definitely the stars, exotic scenery and the songs, not the story".
