= Ghazal Srinivas =

Indian singer

Kesiraju Srinivas
- Also known as: Gazal Srinivas
- Born: Kesiraju Srinivas; 14 October 1966 (age 60)
- Genre: Ghazal
- Occupations: Singer, activist
- Instruments: Vocals, frame drum
- Website: ghazalsrinivas.com

Kesiraju Srinivas (born 14 October 1966), popularly known as Ghazal Srinivas, is a Ghazal singer, actor, activist, and frame drum player from Hyderabad, India. He holds the Guinness World Record for most languages sung. He did pioneering work in Telugu Ghazals. He also sings Ghazals in Hindi and Urdu languages. He gave performances in many countries across the world. As part of his peace mission he traveled to war-hit countries like Afghanistan, Pakistan, Iraq, etc. to spread the non-violence movement preached by Mahatma Gandhi. In 2005, he started Ghazal Charitable Trust to promote Ghazals and world peace.

Srinivas, a native of Palakol in West Godavari District, was born in Tekkali, Srikakulam district, Andhra Pradesh. He worked as a librarian at Bharatiya Vidya Bhavan, Bhimavaram and Sainik School, Korukonda, for a decade. He started singing Telugu ghazals in 1986. He uses a frame drum as his only accompaniment.

== Life ==
Srinivas was born in Tekkali, Srikakulam district of Andhra Pradesh. His grandfather Kesiraju Venkata Narasimham Pantulu was a freedom fighter. His father Narasimharao got settled in Palakollu as part of his job. His mother Rathnavali is a housewife. He got attracted towards music right from his childhood. He used to sing film songs on various stages. Despite his interest in music, his parents initially were not very keen on pursuing a career in Music. In 1980, he received an award in Light music from the prestigious Tyagaraja Gana Sabha. After this incident, his parents realized his talent in music and sent him to Pandit Hare Ram to learn Carnatic music. He did BA in political science from Andhra University. He also completed Bachelor of Library Science from University of Madras in 1989. Before turning into a full time Ghazal singer, he worked as a librarian in Bharatiya Vidya Bhavan, Bhimavaram, Korukonda Sainik school.

== Career ==
He mostly used to sing film songs from his childhood. In 1986, he happened to listen Ghazals written and composed by C. Narayana Reddy. Then he decided to make his unique style by experimenting with Ghazals. Narayana Reddy also encouraged him by penning lyrics suited for his singing. He also taught him tricks of the trade while singing Ghazals. He has a unique style of singing Ghazals as he uses only one instrument kanjeera (tambourine) as his accompaniment. He sings the ghazals written by noted Telugu poet C. Narayana Reddy, and himself along with others.

He gave his first Ghazal performance in 1986. 1993 Rotary club sponsored his trip to USA to sing Ghazals to spread the national pride of India. After returning from that 60-day trip, he wanted to revolutionize the art of Ghazal singing, and started spending more time on it.

In 2005, he took part in 1538 km peace march from Delhi to Multan along with Ramon Magsaysay Award winner Sandeep Pandey and more than 40 distinguished people from different fields. He composed an album Shanti Yatra (peace march) to promote healthy relationship between India and Pakistan. This album was released by Abdul Kalam in New Delhi, who was the president of India at that time. They distributed the music CDs to Pakistan citizens during their visit. In 2006, he participated in world peace conclave held in Lahore to oppose the development of atomic weapons. He observed two-day fast to support this cause.

In 2016, he played a vital role in the restoration of Pinakini Satygraha Ashramam at Pallepadu of Nellore District, Andhra Pradesh which was founded in 1921 by Mahatma Gandhi. He was felicitated with Peace Award for his Album Salam-Bogo by Afghan Olympic Association. He performed in the places like prisons in Warangal, Vizag, Vijayawada. In 2017 he sang the songs in Hebrew, English and Hindi languages in Israel Parliament. He also promotes talent in the youth to express poetical skills through Ghazals.

He raised funds for the new Ram Mandir being built in Ayodhya, Uttar Pradesh by performing Ghazal concerts across various places.

His Ghazal Charitable Trust along with North America Telugu Society (NATS) unveiled the statue of noted musician M. Balamuralikrishna in his native village Sankaraguptam in March 2020.

As part of Azadi Ka Amrita Mahotsav he has composed a song on the Telugu freedom fighter Alluri Sitarama Raju when the prime minister Narendra Modi visited Bheemavaram in Andhra Pradesh in July 2022. He conducted JPL - Jaihind Premier League in Vizag on 26 October 2022, a first of its kind cricket tournament to promote Sanatana Dharma, and patriotism. The teams are named after the famous freedom fighters.

His audio of the recitation of 108 selected poems from Andhra Mahabharatam is released by Kanchi seer, Vijayendra Saraswati on 12 December 2022 in Peruru of East Godavari district.

His Telugu audio compositions from Ramayana, Mahabharata, and Bhagavatam are released by Avimukteshwarananda Saraswati Swami of Thiruvananthapuram, Kerala in October 2024.

=== Films ===
Srinivas has been part of a few films. He entered into the Telugu films as a lead actor in the film Vichitram directed by Jandhyala. This was the last film directed by Jandhyala. He also played a guest role in 2005 Telugu thriller, A Film by Aravind. In 2015, he acted in a film Anushtanam which is based on a story written by Gudipati Venkatachalam in the 1950s.

=== Filmography ===
Title	Year	Role	Language(s)	Note	Ref.
Vichitram	1999	Dasarathi	Telugu		
A Film by Aravind	2005	Satyam	Telugu		
Anushtanam	2016	Kesava Rao	Telugu		

== Awards ==
He received an honorary doctorate from Cosmopolitan University, Missouri, USA in the field of performing arts in 2005. He also received D.Lit (Doctor of letters) from Acharya Nagarjuna University in 2008. Government of Andhra Pradesh conferred him with Kalaratna award in 2011. This award is presented every year to the people who have contributed greatly towards the field of arts and culture. NATS (North America Telugu Society) conferred him with the title Gaana Kalaa Vachaspati in 2012.

He received Lata Mangeshkar Memorial award on the occasion of her birthday celebrations in Pune on 18 September 2022. He performed some Hindi and Urdu Ghazals in her memory. He is also awarded INR 21,000.

He was conferred with Sant Kabir Sufi Gayaka award on April 30, 2023, in Indore, Madhya Pradesh as part of a festival commemorating Santh Kabir. The award is presented to him by Santosh Agnihotri, director of Akash Vani, Indore.

== World Records ==
He entered into the Guinness Book of World Records for the first time in 2008 when he sang 100 songs in 100 languages. In 2009, he again set a new world record by singing 125 songs in 125 languages. He set the third world record by performing maximum number of concerts (55) in 24 hours in 2010.

== Positions held ==
He served as an honorary adviser for rural development from 2005 to 2008 when Y. S. Rajasekhar Reddy was the chief minister of united Andhra Pradesh.

After Andhra Pradesh was bifurcated, Andhra Saraswata Parishath, a cultural organization which is dedicated to promote Telugu literature was renamed to Telangana Saraswata Parishath. A new organization is formed with the previous name with Ghazal Srinivas as its chairman in 2017. He organized international Telugu celebrations from 6th to 8th in January 2022.

He was the brand ambassador for Save Temples Mission organized by savetemples.org and Global Hindu Heritage foundation.

As part of the Save Temples mission, he raised awareness of protecting old temples by conducting concerts and bringing the plight of some old temples to government's notice.

== Sexual misconduct allegations ==
A woman complained that Srinivas was harassed for months. The police registered the case on Tuesday, 2 January 2018 after validating the evidence furnished by the victim, who lodged a two-page complaint with the Punjagutta police on 29 December 2017. Police said Srinivas had forced the woman to do body massage including private parts. "Under the veil he is living in, under the 'save the temples' disguise he's wearing like a thick blanket, neither my friends nor my mother will believe that he's such a sex pervert," said the woman.

Srinivas was taken into custody on charges of sexually harassing a woman, working as jockey for a web radio 'Alayavani' of 'Save Temples' organization. The police presented Ghazal Srinivas in court and he was remanded to judicial custody for 10 days. The singer was shifted to Chanchalguda Central Jail.

SaveTemples Organization suspended Dr. Ghazal Srinivas as Brand Ambassador where these allegations were reported.
