= D. K. Sapru =

Indian film actor

- Born: Daya Kishan Sapru; 16 March 1916; Jammu and Kashmir, British India
- Died: 20 October 1979 (aged 63); Bombay, Maharashtra, India
- Occupation: Actor
- Years active: 1944–1979
- Spouse: Hemawati Sapru
- Children: Reema Rakesh Nath (daughter); Tej Sapru (son); Priti Sapru (daughter)

Daya Kishan Sapru (16 March 1916 – 20 October 1979), was an Indian actor famed for a variety of character roles in Hindi cinema, particularly villains, judges and aristocrats in crime thrillers and dramas. His most notable performances were in Bollywood productions of between the late 1950s and early 1970s, including Sahib Bibi Aur Ghulam, Heer Raanjha, Pakeezah, Kala Pani, Dooj Ka Chand, Tere Mere Sapne, Humjoli, Jewel Thief, and Deewar.

Born to Kashmiri Pandit parents in 1916, Sapru made his Bollywood debut in Chand (1944), starring Prem Adib, another Kashmiri Pandit actor. By the early 1970s, Sapru had risen to prominence as a villain in crime thrillers. Although he died in 1979, he continued to appear in several films that were released in the 1980s, including Krodhi (1981).

His son Tej Sapru and younger daughter Preeti Sapru are actors in Punjabi and Hindi films. His elder daughter Reema Rakesh Nath is a scriptwriter and director, and her son, actor Karan Nath, is Sapru's only grandson.

== Selected filmography ==
Year	Film	Role	Credited as
1981	Kudrat	Janak Singh's Father	Sapru
1981	Krodhi	Zamindar (Raja's Dad)	
1980	Jyoti Bane Jwala		
1978	Chor Ke Ghar Chor	Thakur	Sapru
1978	Naya Daur (1978 film)	Hotel Manager	Sapru
1978	Vishwanath	Judge	Sapru
1978	Phaansi	Chhaya's Father	Sapru
1978	Ram Kasam		
1977	Rangaa Aur Raja		
1977	Mukti	Mr. Verma	Sapru
1977	Guru Manio Granth	Chandu Seth	
1977	Chhaila Babu	Ramesh Verma	Uncredited
1977	Alibaba Marjinaa	Badshah	
1977	Dharam Veer	Badshah	Sapru
1977	Dream Girl	Sindhi Groom's Dad	Sapru
1977	Gayatri Mahima		
1977	Jai Ambe Maa		
1976	Charas	Watson	Sapru
1976	Adalat	Judge	
1975	Faraar	Defence Lawyer	Sapru
1975	Pratigya (1975 film)	Purohit	
1975	Rafoo Chakkar	#6 Duo	Sapru
1975	Deewaar	Mr. Agarwal	Sapru
1975	Lafange	Dhanraj	
1974	Majboor	Neelu's Dad	Sapru
1974	Benaam	Mr. Sharma	
1974	Haath Ki Safai	Baba Sheikh	Sapru
1974	Resham Ki Dori	Anupama's Grandfather	Sapru
1974	Patthar Aur Payal	Rai Bahadur Shiv Narayan Sinha	Sapru
1974	5 Rifles	Maharaja	Sapru
1974	Kasauti	Hariram	Sapru
1974	Do Chattane	Dhaniram	
1974	Imtihaan	College Chairman	
1974	Chowkidaar	Thakur Ranvir Singh	
1974	Dukh Bhanjan Tera Naam	as Raja Duni Chand	Punjabi Movie
1974	Paise Ki Gudiya	Raja Saheb (Madhavi's Patron)	Sapru
1974	Prem Shastra	Judge	
1974	Shaitan	Police Commissioner	Sapru
1973	Zanjeer	Patil	Sapru
1972	Bhai Ho To Aisa	Thakur Vikram Singh	Sapru
1972	Pakeezah	Hakim Saab	Sapru
1971	Gambler	Ganga Ram	Sapru
1971	Shri Krishna Leela	Raja Kansa	Sapru
1970	Prem Pujari	Military Judge	Sapru
1970	Heer Ranjha		Sapru
1969	Sajan	manoj Kumar father	
1969	Satyakam	Diwan Bajridhar Talwar	Sapru
1968	Humsaya	Mr. Sen	Sapru
1967	Hare Kanch Ki Chooriyan	Amarchand Mehra	Sapru
1967	Jewel Thief	Seth Vishambhar Nath	Sapru
1966	Dil Diya Dard Liya	Thakur	Sapru
1965	Johar-Mehmood in Goa	Hakim	
1965	Shaheed	Sardar Kishan Singh	Sapru
1964	Leader	King of Shahgarh	Sapru
1963	Mujhe Jeene Do	Zamindar	Sapru
1962	Sahib Bibi Aur Ghulam	Chaudhary (Majhle Sarkar)	Sapru
1962	Sangeet Samrat Tansen	Raja Ramchandra	Sapru
1960	Hum Hindustani	Judge	
1958	Kalapani	Diwan Sardarilal	Sapru
1955	Waman Avtar	Mahabali	Sapru
1953	Jhansi Ki Rani	General Sir Hugh Rose	Sapru
1948	Lal Dupatta	Manager	Sapru
1947	Romeo and Juliet		
1944	Chand		
