= Izzatdaar =

- Theatrical release poster
- Directed by: K. Bapaiah
- Written by: Shafiq Ansari
- Produced by: Sudhakar Bokade
- Starring: Dilip Kumar; Govinda; Madhuri Dixit; Raghuvaran
- Cinematography: A. Venkatesh
- Edited by: Waman Bhonsle
- Music by: Laxmikant–Pyarelal
- Production company: Divya Films International
- Distributed by: Eros International
- Release date: 16 March 1990
- Running time: 173 mins
- Country: India
- Language: Hindi

Izzatdaar (transl. honourable) is a 1990 Indian Hindi-language film starring Dilip Kumar, Govinda, Madhuri Dixit, Bharathi, Anupam Kher, Shafi Inamdar and South Indian actor Raghuvaran in his Bollywood film debut. The film, one of K. Bapaiah’s last directorial efforts, was described as ”an attempt to capture the painful moral decline in society vis-à-vis the unshakeable ethics of a few strong-willed individuals.”

== Synopsis ==
Brahm Dutt (Dilip Kumar) is framed for murder and jailed by his scheming son-in-law Indrajeet (Raghuvaran). His daughter Sonu (Swapna) also gets killed at the hands of Indrajeet. When Mohini (Madhuri) confronts him about his evil deeds Indrajeet tries to molest her. Brahm Dutt must find a way to avenge the death of his daughter and the years spent in prison. Vijay (Govinda) works for the underworld after he is shot as a child. After finding love with Mohini, Vijay changes his ways and joins up with Brahm Dutt to take revenge, as he too has been wronged by the same group of villains.

== Music ==
The music was composed by Laxmikant-Pyarelal, and the songs were written by Anand Bakshi.

Song	Singer
"Ek Rasgulla Kahin Phat Gaya"	Amit Kumar; Alka Yagnik
"Tumko Dekhke Jhoom Gaya"	Amit Kumar; Alka Yagnik
"Kis Kisko Main Kiss Karoon"	Amit Kumar; Alka Yagnik
"Yaad Rakhiyo Yeh Chaar Akshar Pyaar Ke"	Mohammed Aziz; Alka Yagnik
"Dulhan Bani Meri Bitiya Rani"	Mohammed Aziz; Sudesh Bhosle

== Cast ==
- Dilip Kumar as Brahm Dutt
- Govinda as Vijay
- Madhuri Dixit as Mohini
- Bharathi as Sujata
- Raghuvaran as Indrajeet Sabharwal
- Swapna as Sonu
- Shakti Kapoor as Jetha Shankar
- Anupam Kher as Jailor Mushtaque Ali
- Shafi Inamdar as Premchand
- Asrani as Constable Khairatlal
- Yunus Parvez as Announcer Saxena
- Shiva Rindani as Shiva
- Tej Sapru as Kubba
- Guddi Maruti as Mrs. Jetha Shankar
- Vikas Anand as Doctor Mohandas Adhikari
- Dilip Dhawan as Tony
- Jack Gaud as Chhagan
- Mukri
