= Anokha Andaaz =

Anokha Andaaz अनोखा अंदाज़
- Directed by: Lawrence D'Souza
- Written by: Jalees Sherwani
- Produced by: Daulat Fulwadhya
- Starring: Manish Kumar; Manisha Koirala
- Cinematography: Lawrence D'Souza
- Edited by: R. Rajendran
- Music by: Songs: Nadeem-Shravan; Score: Amar
- Release date: 12 May 1995
- Running time: 148 minutes
- Country: India
- Language: Hindi

Anokha Andaaz is a 1995 Indian Bollywood romantic film directed by Lawrence D'Souza and produced by Daulat Fulwadhya. It stars Manish Kumar and Manisha Koirala in pivotal roles. Cast also includes Kader Khan, Asrani and Dalip Tahil.

== Cast ==
- Manish Kumar - Manish Khanna
- Manisha Koirala - Reema
- Kader Khan - B. S. Khanna (Father of Manish Khanna)
- Dalip Tahil - Mehta
- Annu Kapoor - Charlie
- Asrani - Nazakat Ali
- Anand Balraj - Shiva
- Tej Sapru - Ramesh
- Bindu Desai
- Dinesh Hingoo

== Soundtrack ==
The music of this movie was composed by Nadeem–Shravan, while the lyrics were written by Sameer Anjaan except Mehfil Mein Sitaron Ki by Surendra Saathi. The songs were released on Ultra Series. The songs were rendered by Kumar Sanu, Alka Yagnik, Vinod Rathod, Sapna Mukherjee and Babul Supriyo.

| # | Title | Singer(s) |
|---|---|---|
| 1. | "Dil Tod Ke Mat Jaiyo" | Sapna Mukherjee |
| 2. | "Mousam Aashiqana Hai" | Kumar Sanu & Alka Yagnik |
| 3. | "Mehfil Mein Sitaron Ki" | Kumar Sanu |
| 4. | "Tu Deewana Paagal" | Kumar Sanu & Alka Yagnik |
| 5. | "Aap Se Pehle" | Vinod Rathod & Alka Yagnik |
| 6. | "Barsaat Ka Mousam Hai" | Babul Supriyo & Sapna Mukherjee |
