= Yeh Dil Aashiqanaa =

- Movie Poster
- Directed by: Kuku Kohli
- Written by: Kuku Kohli; Tanveer Khan (dialogues)
- Produced by: Aruna Irani
- Starring: Karan Nath; Jividha Sharma; Rajat Bedi; Aditya Pancholi
- Cinematography: Baba Azmi
- Edited by: Sanjay Jaiswal
- Music by: Nadeem–Shravan
- Production company: AK Films
- Release date: 18 January 2002
- Country: India
- Language: Hindi
- Budget: ₹4.25 crore
- Box office: ₹10.57 crore

Yeh Dil Aashiqanaa (transl. This heart's lover) is a 2002 Indian Hindi-language romantic action thriller film directed by Kuku Kohli and produced by Aruna Irani. The film stars Karan Nath and Jividha Sharma.

== Plot ==
Karan Malhotra and Pooja study at the same college in Pune. They fall in love, and everything seems to be going well until one day, while visiting her brother in Mumbai, Pooja's flight is hijacked by a group of terrorists following the arrest of their leader, Ashraf-ul-Haq Malik.

The hijacking has been orchestrated by Pooja's brother, Vijay Varma, who is in league with the terrorist leader Akhmash Jalal. Vijay is unaware that his sister is on the flight. When he realises this, he is unable to do anything, as Akhmash forbids him from jeopardising their mission.

Karan risks his life to rescue Pooja and the other passengers, eliminating all the hijackers on the plane in the process, thereby incurring the wrath of Akhmash and Vijay. Akhmash then sets out to kill Karan. Meanwhile, Vijay puts his foot down when Pooja reveals her intention to marry Karan.

Pooja and Karan decide to escape, but they are pursued and captured by Akhmash and his men, who hold them captive in his den. Akhmash then attempts to blackmail the Indian government by demanding the release of his leader, Ashraf-ul-Haq Mallik, in exchange for the lives of Karan and Pooja. The Indian government agrees to release Ashraf-ul-Haq Mallik to save them. In the final scene, Karan fights the terrorists, and all the villains are killed, including Ashraf-ul-Haq Mallik. Karan and Pooja are finally reunited.

== Cast ==
- Karan Nath as Karan Malhotra, Pooja's love interest.
- Jividha Sharma as Pooja Verma, Karan's love interest.
- Aditya Pancholi as Akmash Jalaal
- Rajat Bedi as Vijay Verma, Pooja's brother.
- Aruna Irani as Karan's mother
- Vishal Khanna as Ashraf-ul-Haq Malik
- Arun Bakshi as Airport Patrolling Staff
- Johnny Lever as Professor

== Soundtrack ==
Yeh Dil Aashiqanaa

Soundtrack album by Nadeem–Shravan
- Released: 2001
- Genre: Feature film soundtrack
- Length: 50:12
- Label: Tips Official

The soundtrack was composed by the music duo Nadeem–Shravan with lyrics written by Sameer. According to the Indian trade website Box Office India, with around 16,00,000 units sold, this film's soundtrack album was the year's twelfth highest-selling.

#	Song	Singer
1.	"Yeh Dil Aashiqana"	Kumar Sanu, Alka Yagnik
2.	"Utha Le Jaoonga"	Kumar Sanu, Anuradha Paudwal
3.	"I Am In Love"	Kumar Sanu, Alka Yagnik
4.	"Jab Se Main"	Kumar Sanu
5.	"College Ki Ladkiyan"	Udit Narayan
6.	"Dhak Chik Dana"	Kumar Sanu, Anuradha Paudwal
7.	"Jab Se Dil"	Sarika Kapoor
8.	"Allah Allah" (Qawali)	Sabri Brothers, Sonu Nigam, Alka Yagnik & Tauseef Akhtar
9	"Yeh Dil Aashiqana" (Remix)	Shaan, Jividha Sharma

== Reception ==
Anna M. M. Vetticad of India Today wrote, "Nath shows some spark. Jividha doesn't. Despite laughable improbabilities, a watchable film." Ronjita Kulkarni of Rediff.com wrote, "What does Yeh Dil Aashiqanaa offer? Well, apart from the usual masala and drama, nothing out of the ordinary. The music is jarring and too many. Though the action sequences are well executed and quite enjoyable."

Released on 18 January 2002, the film opened to ₹47 lakh on 160 screens in India and did a lifetime business of ₹10.57 crore.
