= Kaadhale Nimmadhi =

1998 film by Indhran

- Theatrical release poster
- Directed by: Indhran
- Written by: Indhran
- Produced by: Sivasakthi Pandian
- Starring: Murali; Suriya; Jeevitha Sharma; Sangeetha
- Cinematography: Thangar Bachan
- Edited by: B. Lenin; V. T. Vijayan
- Music by: Deva
- Production company: Sivasakthi Movie Makers
- Release date: 14 January 1998
- Country: India
- Language: Tamil

Kaadhale Nimmadhi (Note: Spelt as Kathaley Nimmadhi and Kathaley Nimmathi on the CBFC certificate and the title card, respectively.) (transl. Love itself is peace) is a 1998 Indian Tamil-language romantic drama film directed by Indhran (in his directoral debut). The film stars Murali, Suriya, Jeevitha Sharma (credited as Kavitha) and Sangeetha (credited as Rasika). Radhika, Manivannan and Nassar also play significant roles in the film, while Deva composed the soundtrack. The film was released on 14 January 1998.

== Plot ==
Kavitha, who is part of a large family, is to be married to Chandramohan, a lawyer. Once as Kavita is playing with a little girl, Chandru is seen capturing photos of statues. Kavitha's brother (Nassar), who wrongly assumes both of them to be in love with each other, starts hitting Chandru. The whole family suspects Kavitha of falling in love and refuses to believe her explanation.

When Kavitha disappears from home, her family assumes Chandru abducted her and gets him arrested. Chandramohan fights on behalf of Chandru with Kavitha revealing the actual reason. Chandramohan advises Kavitha's family to get her married to Chandru, to which they accept.

== Cast ==
- Murali as Chandramohan
- Suriya as Chandru
- Jividha Sharma as Kavitha (Credited as Kavitha)
- Sangeetha as Swapna (Credited as Rasika)
- Charuhasan as Kavitha's father
- Bharathi Vishnuvardhan as Kavitha's mother
- Nassar as Prakash, Kavitha's brother
- Geetha as Parvathi, Prakash wife
- Manivannan as Velayudham
- Radhika as Bhagyam, Chandru's mother
- Vivek as Panchu
- Ramji as Prabhu
- Thalaivasal Vijay as Singer
- Sathyan as Akash
- Thenkachi Ko. Swaminathan as Judge
- Omakuchi Narasimhan as Arokiya Samy
- Vaiyapuri as Beggar
- Shanthi Williams
- Pandu as Dandayudham
- Crane Manohar
- V. Gowthaman as Servant
- K. S. Jayalakshmi
- B. Lenin (cameo appearance in song "Kandhan Irukkum")
- Harikumar as a dancer in "Kaadhale Nimmathi"

== Production ==
After the success of Kadhal Kottai (1996) and Kaalamellam Kadhal Vaazhga (1997), producer Sivasakthi Pandian announced he was set to make another love story Kaadhale Nimmadhi, written and directed by Rajan, director of Solaikuyil (1989) and Malai Chaaral (1991). Pandian gave him the stage name of Indhran. Prashanth had initially been signed on to portray the lead role, but opted out post the success of Jeans (1998), and was replaced by Suriya. The débutante lead actress, Jeevitha Sharma, a fifteen-year-old at the time, was noticed by Pandian in his search for a new heroine for the film. Pandian also opened a contest in Kumudam magazine to rename Sharma and give her a stage name to suit Tamil tastes and traditions. She was later christened as Kavitha by the producer before the film's release.

== Soundtrack ==
Soundtrack was composed by Deva. His daughter, Sangita, sang her first film song "Indha Devathaikku" in the album.

S.No	Song	Singers	Lyrics	Length
1	"Gangai Nathiye" (Female)	Swarnalatha	Ponniyin Selvan	05:30
2	"Gangai Nathiye" (Male)	S. P. Balasubrahmanyam	Ponniyin Selvan	05:32
3	"Indha Devathaikku"	Sangita	Arivumathi	04:28
4	"Kaalaiyil"	Hariharan, K. S. Chithra	Arivumathi	05:22
5	"Kandhan Irukkum"	Sabesh	Palani Bharathi	05:23
6	"Vidha Vidhama"	Deva	Deva	04:56

== Reception ==
D. S. Ramanujam of The Hindu wrote, "There is a new line of thinking in the core of the plot based on suspicion but the situations that go to build on that issue are inadequate. What started as an engrossing fare slowly peters out [...] Director Indran who has written the story and screenplay runs out of ideas and meekly resorts to the comedy of Vivek and Manivannan". Ji of Kalki wrote despite being suited for their respective characters, acting of Suriya and Kavitha should have been better while Murali's character stays in mind and called lack of duets and lack of scope for actors not to influence the plot as notable points.

== Post-release ==
Soon after the release of the film, director Indhran teamed up with Murali for a film titled Thamirabharani co-starring Rambha in a lead role. Despite progressing through production and changing the title to Thendralai Thoodhu Viddu, the film did not have a theatrical release.
