= Aravind 2 =

- Poster
- Directed by: Sekhar Suri
- Written by: Surendra Krishna
- Produced by: G. Phanindra; G. Vijay Choudary
- Starring: Mangam Srinivas; Kamal Kamaraju; Srinivas Avasarala; Adonika; Sri Reddy; Pokiri Vijay; Bala Prasad
- Cinematography: K. Rajendra Babu
- Edited by: Bhimreddy Tirupathi Reddy
- Music by: Vijay Kuravkula
- Production company: Sri Vijayabheri Productions
- Release date: 29 March 2013
- Running time: 152 minutes
- Country: India
- Language: Telugu

Aravind 2 is a 2013 Indian Telugu-language thriller film directed by Sekhar Suri starring Sri, Maadhavi Latha, Kamal Kamaraju, Srinivas Avasarala and Adonica. It is a sequel to the 2005 movie, A Film by Aravind. G. Phanindra and G. Vijay Choudary produced the film for Sri Vijayabheri Productions while Vijay Kurakula provided the music. It was released on 29 March 2013.

== Plot ==
The story revolves around a struggling filmmaker named Aravind (played by Sri) who is looking for a breakthrough in the film industry. Frustrated with his unsuccessful attempts, Aravind decides to make a documentary on haunted places, hoping that it will bring him recognition and success. Aravind, along with his cameraman Rishi (played by Kamal Kamaraju) and production manager Harsha (played by Srinivas Avasarala), embarks on a journey to explore a supposedly haunted house located in a remote village. They set up their equipment and begin filming, determined to capture paranormal activities and prove the existence of ghosts.

As the crew starts their investigation, strange and unexplained events occur within the house. They experience eerie sounds, ghostly apparitions, and bizarre occurrences that shake them to the core. Gradually, the atmosphere in the house becomes increasingly terrifying, and the crew realizes that they have stumbled upon something much more sinister than they anticipated. Amidst the supernatural occurrences, Aravind also learns about the dark history of the haunted house. He discovers that a notorious serial killer, who was responsible for several brutal murders in the past, used to reside there. The spirit of the killer is believed to haunt the house, seeking revenge on anyone who enters.

As the crew members get entangled in the web of horror, they find themselves fighting for their lives. They try to unravel the mysteries surrounding the house and the malevolent spirit that lurks within. In their desperate attempts to survive, they encounter spine-chilling encounters, psychological torment, and disturbing revelations. Throughout the film, Aravind's sanity is tested, and he becomes increasingly obsessed with capturing evidence of the supernatural. The line between reality and illusion blurs, and the crew faces numerous challenges that push them to their limits.

Without revealing too much, the climax of the movie reveals shocking twists and turns that expose the true nature of the haunting and the identity of the vengeful spirit. Aravind and his crew must find a way to confront the evil force and escape from the clutches of the haunted house before it consumes them completely.

== Cast ==
- Mangam Srinivas as Aravind
- Maadhavi Latha as Priya
- Kamal Kamaraju as Rishi
- Adonica
- Sri Reddy
- Srinivas Avasarala as Film director
- Banerjee
- Surya as Sudarshan, Priya's father
- Pokiri Vijay
- Bala Prasad as Co-director

== Reception ==
Pasupulate of The Times of India rated the film two stars out of five, saying, "Being a sequel of the 2006 cult thriller, A Film by Aravind, we can't help but compare it to the original – this one isn't a patch on the original. We're afraid it's all sound – background score, we mean – and no substance". Vishnupriya Bhandaram of The Hindu wrote, "Aravind 2 gives you the promise of a Jason Voorhees (reckon Friday the 13th) but bails on you right in the beginning. It isn't because the storyline isn't strong enough but simply because the filmmakers deem it all right to include crass elements and characters, to give it unnecessary padding".
