= Mohabbat (1997 film) =

- Directed by: Reema Rakesh Nath
- Written by: Reema Rakesh Nath
- Produced by: Rakesh Nath
- Starring: Madhuri Dixit; Akshaye Khanna; Sanjay Kapoor
- Cinematography: Rajan Kinagi
- Edited by: Waman Bhonsle
- Music by: Songs: Nadeem-Shravan; Score: Surindher Sodhi
- Release date: 19 September 1997
- Running time: 180 minutes
- Country: India
- Language: Hindi
- Budget: ₹4.75 crore
- Box office: ₹9.76 crore

Mohabbat (translation: Love/Romance) is a 1997 Indian Hindi-language romantic drama film directed by Reema Nath, starring Madhuri Dixit, Sanjay Kapoor, and Akshaye Khanna. The film was released on 19 September 1997.

== Plot ==
The wealthy Kapoor family consists of Madanlal, his wife Geeta, daughter Roshni, and son Gaurav. One day, while Gaurav is returning home from a bank, he is attacked by a group of henchmen led by Shiva, but a young man named Rohit Malhotra comes to his rescue. Gaurav hires Rohit in his firm, and they become fast and inseparable friends. Both fall in love with the same woman, Shweta Sharma, but Gaurav finds out and decides to step away.

Shweta and Rohit are in love and want to get married. Then, Shiva attacks Rohit is enraged when throws him off a cliff. Believing him to be dead, a shocked and devastated Shweta loses her voice. The Kapoors find out that Gaurav loves Shweta, and they approach her brother, Shekhar, and arrange their marriage. They get engaged, but Gaurav finds that he has a brain tumour, and he wants to bring back the long-lost happiness of Shweta. He finds a lookalike of Rohit, who is Tony Braganza.

What Gaurav doesn't know is whether or not Tony is Rohit. Thus begins a merry-go-round of love, emotions, and sacrifice, which is 'Mohabbat'. In the last scene, it is revealed that Rohit has planned his murder after knowing the fact that the secret admirer of Shweta is none other than Gaurav, and he's in love with her. Soon, he decided to sacrifice his love for friendship.

However, Gaurav finally gets partner to know that Tony is Rohit and Gaurav asks him to go back to Shweta. Lastly, Gaurav dies due to his tumour, and Shweta gets her voice back due to shock.

== Cast ==
- Sanjay Kapoor as Gaurav Kapoor
- Madhuri Dixit as Shweta Sharma
- Akshaye Khanna as Rohit Malhotra / Tony Briganza
- Farooq Sheikh as Shekhar Sharma, Shweta's brother.
- Farida Jalal as Geeta Kapoor
- Saeed Jaffrey as Madanlal Kapoor "Madan"
- Tej Sapru as Dr. R.C. Goyal
- Shiva Rindani as Shiva
- M.F. Husain as himself (special appearance)
- Kishore Bhanushali as Mechanic
- Guddi Maruti as Khalajaan, Lady in black burqah
- Sulabha Arya as Mrs. Malhotra
- Dimple Ghosh as Roshni Kapoor, Gaurav Sister
- Ashwin Kaushal as Virendra "Viren" Gupta
- Bob Brahmbhatt as Aslam
- Babbanlal Yadav as Mr.Ramaswamy, Madrasi clerk
- Raj Kamal as Doctor
- Ghanshyam Rohera as Malhotra's landlord
- Gurmeet as Office Clerk
- Parnav Chowdhary as Staffer
- Praveen Kumar as Mr.Sabharwal
- Ranjan Kaushal as Kidnapper
- Dinesh Hingoo as Shweta's fan
- Beena Banerjee

== Soundtrack ==
The music was composed by Nadeem-Shravan, with lyrics penned by Sameer and Reema Rakesh Nath (for the song Pyar Kiya Hai).

The song "O Baby Dont Break My Heart" was based on Stereo Nation's "Don't Break My Heart" (1994).

According to the Indian trade website Box Office India, it sold 2 million units and became India's eleventh best-selling album of 1997.

| # | Title | Singer |
|---|---|---|
| 1. | "Trishuli Tell" | Kavita Krishnamurthy |
| 2. | "O Baby Dont Break My Heart" | Kavita Krishnamurthy & Abhijeet |
| 3. | "Aaina Bataa Kaise" | Vinod Rathod & Sonu Nigam |
| 4. | "Pyar Kiya Hai" (Duet) | Kavita Krishnamurthy & Vinod Rathod |
| 5. | "Chori Chori Chup Chup" (Part 1) | Kavita Krishnamurthy |
| 6. | "Mumbai Chi Pori" | Kavita Krishnamurthy |
| 7. | "Main Hoon Akela" | Kavita Krishnamurthy & Abhijeet |
| 8. | "Chori Chori Chup Chup" (Part 2) | Kavita Krishnamurthy |
| 9. | "Pyar Kiya Hai" (Sad) | Vinod Rathod |
| 10. | "Dil Ki Dhadkan" | Kavita Krishnamurthy & Udit Narayan |
