= Maahir =

- Poster
- Directed by: Lawrence D'Souza
- Written by: Talat Rakhi
- Produced by: Harish Barot; Shailaish Agarwaal
- Starring: Hema Malini; Govinda; Farha Naaz; Raj Babbar; Anupam Kher
- Cinematography: Lawrence D'Souza
- Edited by: A.R. Rajendran
- Music by: Bappi Lahiri
- Production company: Monang Films International
- Distributed by: Monang Films
- Release date: 26 July 1996 (India)
- Running time: 129 minutes
- Country: India
- Language: Hindi

Maahir is a 1996 Indian Hindi-language action drama film written by Talat Rakhi and directed by Lawrence D'Souza for Monang Films International. The film stars Govinda and Farah Naaz in lead roles.

== Cast ==
- Hema Malini as Mrs. Kamini Rai
- Govinda as Bhola / Police Inspector Shankar
- Farha Naaz as Paro
- Raj Babbar as Jabbar Khan alias J.K.
- Manjeet Kullar
- Anupam Kher as Balwant Rai
- Ranjeet as Bob
- Alok Nath as Amar Rai
- Tej Sapru as Vicky Rai
- Dinesh Hingoo as Constable
- Aruna Irani as Nurse
- Mac Mohan as Murarilal
- Reema Lagoo as Asha
- Kader Khan as Jailor
- Master Bhagwan as Dancer in bar
- Vikas Anand as Corrupt Inspector
- Gopal Shetty

== Music ==
Soundtrack:

1. "Deewanapan Hai Yeh" - Mohammed Aziz, Kavita Krishnamurthy
2. "O Ganga Maiya" - Bappi Lahiri
3. "Raja Raja Ab To Main Hoon" - Sudesh Bhosale, Nitin Mukesh
4. "Roz Roz Rozi Ki Daru Piyo" - Sudesh Bhosale, Usha Mangeshkar
5. "Tukda Main Tere Dil Ka Maa" - Kumar Sanu
6. "Tukda Main Tere Dil Ka Maa" (sad) - Alka Yagnik
7. "Vaada Karke Jaate Ho Tum" - Kumar Sanu, Alka Yagnik
