= Phir Ussi Mod Par =

Indian film

- Directed by: Lekh Tandon
- Written by: Story: Pt. Revati Sharan Sharma; Screenplay & Dialogues: Lekh Tandon
- Produced by: KMPL production. Kanika, Anshula and Trinetra Bajpai.
- Starring: Nadira Babbar; Kanwaljeet Singh; Parmeet Sethi; Jividha Sharma; Kanika Bajpai; Rajeev Verma; Govind Namdev; Smita Jaykar
- Cinematography: Jahangir Chaudhary
- Edited by: Awadh Narayan Singh
- Music by: Shankar Jaikishan; Trinetra Bajpai; Agnel; Faizan
- Production company: Kanika Multiscope Pvt Ltd
- Release date: March 8, 2019
- Running time: 134 minutes
- Country: India
- Language: Hindi

Phir Ussi Mod Par (English: "Back to Square One") is a 2019 Hindi drama film directed by Lekh Tandon. It was released after Tandon's death in 2017.

It was produced by Trinetra, Kanika, and Anshula Bajpai under their banner Kanika Multiscope Pvt Ltd (KMPL).

The film examines the practice of triple talaq, a tradition in Islam where a husband can legally divorce his wife by pronouncing three repudiations at once.

== Plot ==
Naaz (Jividha Sharma) is pregnant when her husband, Shaheed (Parmeet Sethi), divorces her by triple talaq. Shocked, Naaz attempts suicide but is rescued by Rasheed (Kanwaljeet Singh). Rasheed marries her, offering her a new beginning.

Later in life, Naaz encounters another's triple talaq, and she decides to confront it and stand up for the wife's rights.

== Cast ==
- Kanika Bajpai as Ruby Begum
- Nadira Babbar as Anchor
- Kanwaljeet Singh as Rasheed
- Govind Namdev as Zahid Khan
- Parmeet Sethi as Shaheed Khan
- Jividha Sharma as Naaz
- Shikha Iktaan as Shabnam
- S. M. Zaheer as Munshiji
- Smita Jaykar as Beghum
- Vineeta Malik as Ammi
- Rajeev Verma as ADV. Usman Shaikh
- Haider Ali as Sufi
- Sanjay Sharma as Maulvi
- Brij Bhooshan Sahani as ADV. Pandit
- Deepika Amin as Doctor
- Arun Bali
