= Jai Devaa =

- Promotional Poster
- Directed by: Lawrence D'Souza
- Written by: Reema Rakesh Nath
- Produced by: Rita D'Souza
- Starring: Mithun Chakraborty; Sanjay Dutt; Madhuri Dixit; Danny Denzongpa; Laxmikant Berde
- Cinematography: Lawrence D'Souza
- Music by: Nadeem–Shravan
- Running time: 112 min.
- Language: Hindi

Jai Devaa is an unreleased Indian Hindi-language film directed by Lawrence D'Souza, starring Sanjay Dutt, Madhuri Dixit and Mithun Chakraborty.

The film was expected to get released in 1993.

== Plot ==
Jai Devaa is a violent triangular love story.

== Cast ==
- Mithun Chakraborty as Shankar / Ravi
- Sanjay Dutt as Vikram Verma "Vicky"
- Madhuri Dixit as Pooja
- Danny Denzongpa as Dinesh
- Laxmikant Berde as Ramlakhan
