= Paagalpan =

2001 film by Joy Augustine

Pagalpan
- Poster
- Directed by: Joy Augustine
- Written by: Joy Augustine
- Produced by: Ravi Doddi; Rajiv Shah
- Starring: Karan Nath; Aarti Agarwal; Bharat Dabholkar; Joy Fernandes
- Cinematography: Hari Nair
- Edited by: Adesh Verma
- Music by: Raju Singh
- Release date: 8 June 2001
- Country: India
- Language: Hindi

Paagalpan (transl. Madness) is a 2001 Indian Hindi language action-romance film starring Karan Nath and Aarti Agarwal.

== Synopsis ==
Aarti Agarwal and Karan Nath star as Roma Pinto and Sameer Malhotra. Roma Pinto, a beautiful young teenager, is the pride and joy of her five doting brothers, Arun, Jack, Sunny, Harry and Bunty.

Roma falls in love with the dashing and wealthy Sameer Malhotra, the heir to his father's millions. Although her brothers are initially opposed, he wins them over, only for matters to take a turn for the worse when one of Sameer's father's ships sink, killing people from Roma's home town.

One of her brothers finds out about this, but is killed by the police and with Roma's family blaming Sameer for this death, the two young lovers are forced to elope.

== Cast ==
- Karan Nath - Sameer Malhotra
- Aarti Agarwal - Roma Pinto
- Vilas Ujawane - Arun Pinto
- Bharat Dabholkar - Jack Pinto
- Joy Fernandes - Sunny Pinto
- Farhan Khan - Bunny Pinto
- Harvey Rosemeyer - Harry Pinto
- Talat Rekhi - Mr. Malhotra
- Sambhavna Seth - Deepa Malhotra
- Prema Kiran - Macchiwali
- Premendra Sharma - Chief Accountant
- Bakul Thakker - Inspector Vasant
- Raj Nair - Inspector Wagh
- Iqbal Dosani - Insurance Lawyer
- Ramakrishna - Clerk
- Darshan Jariwala - Malpani
- Rajat Nath - Lawyer
- Sunil Kocharekar - Young Arun Pinto
- Priyanka- Young Roma Pinto
- Rahul Dhanani - Young Jack Pinto
- Sparsh Agrawat - Young Sunny Pinto

== Soundtrack ==
The music for the film was composed by Raju Singh and lyrics were penned by Sameer. The album consists of 8 songs. A critic from Rediff.com wrote that "Paagalpan is a complete album. Fresh vocals, melodious music, catchy rhythms and great use of every possible musical instrument".

=== Track listing ===
- "Kahin Na Kahin Hai" - Alka Yagnik, Kumar Sanu
- "Dil Hai Deewana" - Alka Yagnik, Udit Narayan
- "Mera Dil" - Srinivas, K. S. Chithra
- "Dekhte Dekhte" - Srinivas, K.S.Chithra
- "Paagalpan" - Raymond George
- "A Ding Dang Do" - Sunidhi Chauhan, Udit Narayan
- "Jhoote The Vaade" - Alka Yagnik, Kumar Sanu
- "Loota" - Swastik

== Reception ==
A critic from Rediff.com wrote that "All in all, watching Paagalpan is like seeing two films for the price of one: A breezy entertainer and a violent bloodfest". Taran Adarsh of IndiaFM wrote that "On the whole, PAAGALPAN is targeted at the youth, who will like the second half for the performances and intensity in the goings-on".
