= Three (2008 film) =

1. REDRIECT Sekhar Suri
