= Reema Rakesh Nath =

Bollywood writer, director and producer

Reema Rakeshnath
- Occupations: Writer, director
- Spouse: Rakesh Nath
- Children: Karan Nath
- Parent(s): D. K. Sapru; Hemvati
- Relatives: Tej Sapru (brother); Priti Sapru (sister)

Reema Rakesh Nath is a Bollywood film writer, director, and producer best known for scripting the golden jubilee film Saajan, (1991) it was the highest grossing film that year and other films Aarzoo and Hum Tumhare Hain Sanam. she also directed film Mohabbat (1997).

== Personal life ==
She is the daughter of actors D. K. Sapru and Hemvati. Her brother Tej Sapru and sister Priti Sapru are both actors. Reema is married to Producer Rakesh Nath and their son is Bollywood actor Karan Nath.

== Filmography ==
As writer

- Sailaab - Screenplay
- Saajan - Story, Screenplay and Dialogue
- Dil Tera Aashiq - Story
- Jai Devaa - Story, Screenplay and Dialogues
- Yaraana (1995) - Story, Screenplay and Dialogue
- Aarzoo - Writer
- Hum Tumhare Hain Sanam - Dialogue

As Producer

- Yaraana

As Director

- Mohabbat
