= Guns of Banaras =

2020 film diirecred by Sekhar Suri

- Theatrical release poster
- Directed by: Sekhar Suri
- Story by: Vetrimaaran
- Based on: Polladhavan (Tamil)
- Produced by: Shaina Nath; Ashok Munshi
- Starring: Karan Nath; Nathalia; Abhimanyu Singh; Ganesh Venkatraman; Shilpa Shirodkar; Zarina Wahab; Mohan Agashe
- Cinematography: K. K. Rao
- Edited by: Bunty Nagi
- Music by: Songs: Sohail Sen; Background Score: Amar Mohile
- Production company: Dashaka Cinema Co Production
- Distributed by: UFO Moviez
- Release date: 28 February 2020 (India)
- Running time: 132 minutes
- Language: Hindi

Guns of Banaras is an Indian Hindi-language action film directed by Sekhar Suri. It is a remake of the 2007 Tamil film Polladhavan. The film stars Karan Nath and Nathalia in leading roles and Zarina Wahab, Vinod Khanna, Shilpa Shirodkar, Abhimanyu Singh and Tej Sapru in supporting roles.

The film was shot and completed in 2014 but delayed for unknown reasons and released six years later on 28 February 2020.

The film marked the comeback of Karan Nath after 11 years and Shilpa Shirodkar after 20 years. It also marked the final film appearance of Vinod Khanna who died in 2017.

== Cast ==
- Karan Nath as Guddu
- Nathalia as Hema
- Vinod Khanna as Guddu's father
- Zarina Wahab as Guddu's mother
- Ganesh Venkatraman as Vikram Singh
- Abhimanyu Singh as Brijesh Singh
- Shilpa Shirodkar as Brijesh Singh's wife
- Tanvi Rao as Guddu's sister
- Mohan Agashe as Triloki
- Tej Sapru as Hema's father
- Gireesh Sahdev as STF officer
- Salim Baig as Tiwari
- Ashok Pathak as Suleman

== Soundtrack ==
Guns of Banaras

Soundtrack album by Sohail Sen
- Released: 24 February 2020
- Genre: Feature film soundtrack
- Length: 16:30
- Language: Hindi
- Label: Zee Music Company
External audio
- Official Audio Jukebox on YouTube

Its songs are written by Sameer Anjaan and composed by Sohail Sen.

Track listing
No.	Title	Singer(s)	Length
1.	"Band Bajega"	Shahid Mallaya	4:50
2.	"Dheere Dheere Se"	Mohit Chauhan, Pawni Pandey	4:24
3.	"Bande Hai Shankar Ke"	Sohail Sen	2:28
4.	"Pagal Hai Mera Dil"	Sohail Sen, Palak Muchhal	4:48
Total length:			16:30

== Reception ==
The Times of India gave the film two out of five stars and wrote that "What Guns of Banaras primarily lacks is a convincing motive for the protagonist to sail through. So, save yourself from this unpleasant ride."
