= Rajeev Verma =

Indian actor (born 1949)

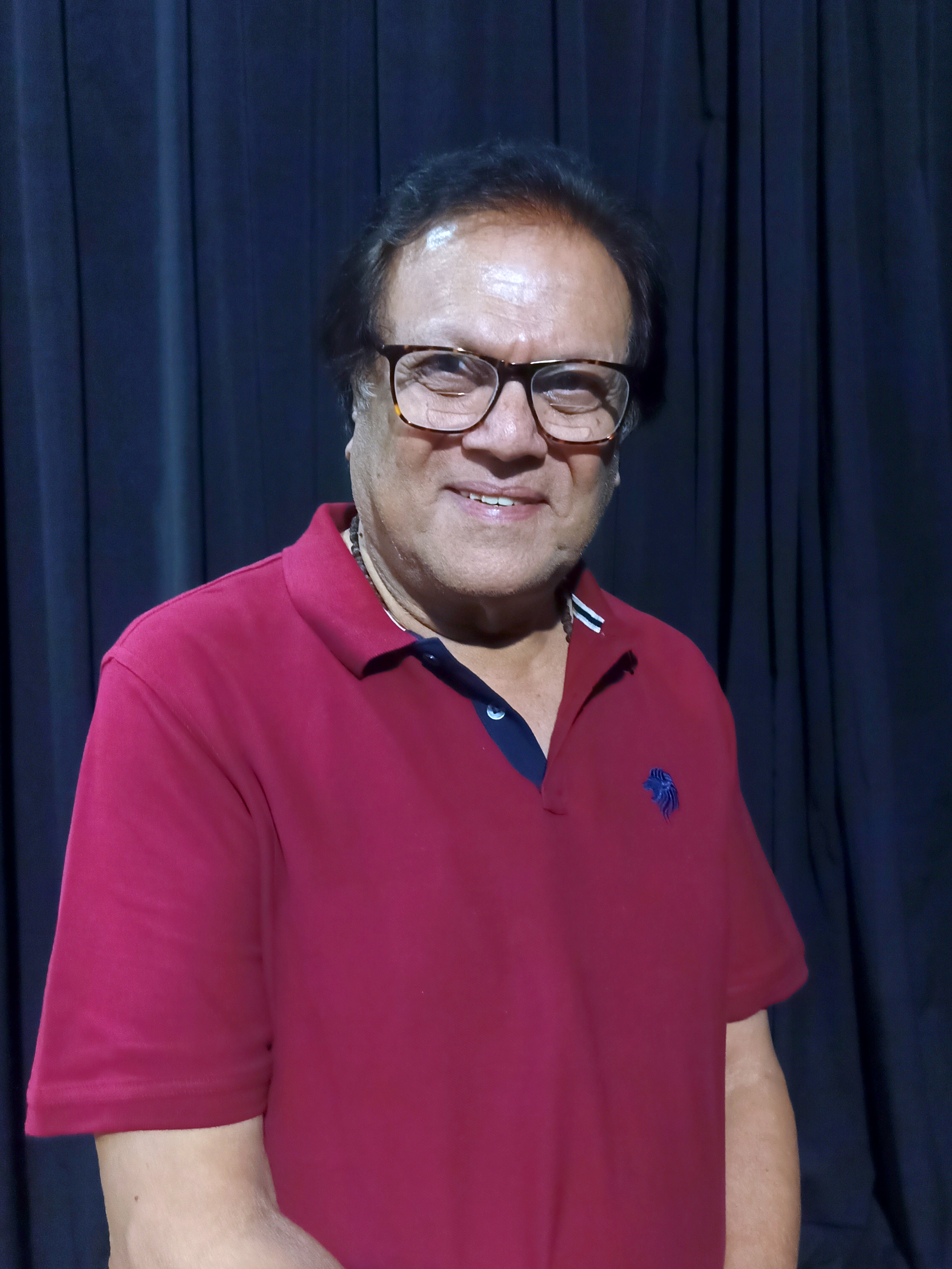
- Rajeev Verma in September 2024
- Born: 28 June 1949 (age 76); Hoshangabad, Central Provinces and Berar, India
- Occupations: Actor, Director, Architect
- Years active: 1987–present
- Spouse: Rita Bhaduri verma (Bhopal)
- Children: Shiladitya Verma (artist and dramatist), Tathagat Verma (software engineer)
- Parent: Babulal Verma (freedom fighter)

Rajeev Verma (born 28 June 1949) is an Indian actor. He has worked in film and television.

== Early life ==
Rajeev Verma is a veteran Indian actor, who works mainly in film and television.

Verma was born in Narmadapuram, Madhya Pradesh, India. He obtained his Architectural Degree from Maulana Azad National Institute of Technology. Later, he earned a master's degree in Urban Design from Delhi's School of Planning and Architecture.

== Personal life ==
Rajeev is married to Rita Bhaduri, younger sister of Jaya Bachchan and thus related to the Bachchan Family. Rita is an educationist based in their hometown Bhopal, and is also a theater actress, who runs the Bhopal Theaters group. She is sometimes mistaken for film and television actress Rita Bhaduri.

== Filmography ==
Year	Film	Role	Notes	Co–Star
1989	Maine Pyar Kiya	Kishan Kumar Chaudhary	Supporting Role	Reema Lagoo
1992	Nishchaiy	Manohar Singh	Negative Role	Moushumi Chatterjee
1992	Deedar	Kailashnath Malhotra	Supporting Role	Anjana Mumtaz
1995	Prem			
1995	Taaqat			
1996	Yeh Majhdhaar	Mr. Rai		
1996	Bal Bramhachari			
1998	Pardesi Babu	Mr. Chopra	Negative Role	
1998	Himmatwala	Durgesh Maheshwari	Negative Role	Beena Banerjee
1999	Hum Dil De Chuke Sanam	Advocate Vikramjeet		
2012	90 Minutes			
2015	Benaras 1918			
2003	Koi Mil Gaya	Nisha's father		
1985	Rehguzar		Supporting Role	
1973	Dhamkee		Supporting Role	
2004	Woh Tera Naam Tha		Supporting Role	
2003	Andaaz	Ishwar Singhania		
2001	Yeh Raaste Hain Pyaar Ke	Dr. Ashok		
1999	Hum Saath Saath Hain	Adarsh Sharma		
1999	Kachche Dhaage	Justice Nariman Sorabhji		
1999	Biwi No.1	Pooja's Father		
1996	Jeet			
2003	Chalte Chalte	Priya's Father		
2004	Madhoshi	Mr. Rajeev Kaul (Anupama's Father)		
2000	Har Dil Jo Pyar Karega	Bharat Oberoi		
2006	Madhubaala	Raj Malhotra's Father		
2000	Kya Kehna	Rahul's Father		
2016	Beiimaan Love			
2011	Aarakshan	Damodar Seth	Sushant's father	
2011	Bbuddah... Hoga Terra Baap	Mirchi Baba		
2014	Bazaar E Husn			
2019	Phir Ussi Mod Par	ADV. Usman Shaikh		
2006	Deadline: Sirf 24 Ghante	Police Commissioner Rana		
2014	Ebn-e-Batuta	Dr. Vashisht		
2006	Jaana... Let's Fall in Love	Shankarnath 'Nath' Sukhani		
2016	Wah Taj	Judge		
2014	Bazaar E Husn			
2006	Aatma	Suman's Husband		
1988	Be-Lagaam		Supporting Role	
2002	Karz: The Burden of Truth	Balwant Singh (Suraj's Adoptive Father)		
1996	Majhdhaar	Rai Sahaab		
1994	Zid	Devendranath Modi	Negative Role	
2015	Jazbaa	Binnu		
