= Tera Kya Hoga Johnny =

Tera Kya Hoga Johny?
- Promotional poster
- Directed by: Sudhir Mishra
- Written by: Sudhir Mishra; Pankaj Kapoor; Joydeep Sarkar
- Produced by: Sudhir Mishra; Manu Kumaran; Titu J Sharma; Co-producer; Karan Arora
- Starring: Karan Nath; Soha Ali Khan; Neil Nitin Mukesh; Kay Kay Menon; Anurag Kashyap; Shahana Goswami Sikandar Agarwal
- Cinematography: Sachin K. Krishn
- Edited by: Archit Damodar Rastogi
- Music by: Pankaj Awasthi; Abhishek Ray; Ali Azmat
- Release dates: 28 December 2008 (Dubai Film Festival); 31 December 2010 (India)
- Country: India
- Language: Hindi

Tera Kya Hoga Johny (transl. What's gonna happen to you, Johny) is a 2008 Indian Hindi-language film directed by Sudhir Mishra, starring Karan Nath, Soha Ali Khan and Neil Nitin Mukesh. It also stars two filmmakers, Anurag Kashyap and Aditya Bhattacharya.

It was supposed to be released in 2008 but was delayed, it was then set for an early 2010 release but in January 2010 it was further delayed because parts of the film were leaked on YouTube while still undergoing post-production work. Mishra (the director) filed an FIR for the police to investigate the source of the leak. Finally it was released on 31 December 2010.

The film is about the city of Mumbai and a child who sells tea on its streets. In the words of Mishra, "It's set at a time when Mumbai wants to be Shanghai." He has also stated that he wants to make a sequel to the film.

== Cast ==
- Karan Nath as Vishal Bhargav
- Soha Ali Khan as Preeti
- Kay Kay Menon as Chiple
- Neil Nitin Mukesh as Parvez
- Saurabh Shukla as Begum
- Vijay Maurya as Chutta
- Shahana Goswami
- Makrand Deshpande
- Manoj Joshi
- Virendra Saxena
- Ashoke Pandit
- Sikandar Agarwal as Johney
- Gagan Mudgal
- Anurag Kashyap as Kashyap (cameo)
- Aditya Bhattacharya
- Abhay Deol Special appearance in song 'Shaher Ki Rani'

== Music ==
1. "Shab Ko Roz Jaga Deta Hai" – Pankaj Awasthi
2. "Tore Naina Naina Le Gaye Chaina" – Ali Azmat
3. "Lehron Ne Kaha Kood Jara" – Pankaj Awasthi
4. "Mai Hu Shehar Ki Rani" – Shreya Ghoshal
5. "Peeche Peeche Ranjhe Ne Hajar Heeriye" – Pankaj Awasthi, Labh Janjua
6. "Tera Kya Hoga Johny" – Sukhwinder Singh
7. "Teri Parchhaiyan" – Ali Azmat

== Controversy ==
In January 2010, the film faced controversy, when a major chunk of the film was released online in 5-6 parts over the online video sharing website, YouTube.
