= Karan Nath =

Indian film actor

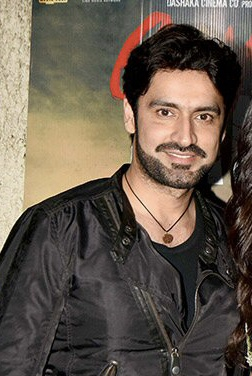
- Nath in 2020
- Born: Mumbai, Maharashtra, India
- Occupation: Actor
- Years active: 1987–2021
- Mother: Reema Rakesh Nath
- Relatives: D. K. Sapru (grandfather)

Karan Nath is an Indian actor. He is best known for his role as the romantic hero in Yeh Dil Aashiqanaa in 2002. In 2021, he participated in Bigg Boss OTT 1.

== Career ==
Karan worked as a child artist in Mr India (1987). He made his debut as a leading actor in the 2001 film Paagalpan opposite Aarti Agarwal. In 2002, he starred in the film Yeh Dil Aashiqanaa. He also starred in the thriller Tum - A Dangerous Obsession and the horror thriller Sssshhh..., for which he was nominated in the Stardust Awards 2004. In 2009, Nath appeared in Tera Kya Hoga Johnny.

After a 11 year hiatus, he next appeared in Guns of Banaras, released on 28 February 2020.

In 2021, he participated in Bigg Boss OTT and got evicted after 20 days along with Ridhima Pandit.

== Personal life ==
Karan Nath's father Rakesh Nath is a Punjabi. Rakesh produced the film Dil Tera Aashiq, and many more.Karan nath is married and has a daughter miraya who was born in 2025.

Karan Nath's mother Reema Rakesh Nath is a Kashmiri, and a screenwriter known for popular film Saajan. His grandfather D. K. Sapru was a well known actor and acted in more than 300 films like Pakeezah, Sahib Bibi Aur Ghulam, Heer Raanjha, to name a few.

== Filmography ==
=== Films ===
Year	Title	Role
1987	Mr India	Child artist
2001	Paagalpan	Sameer
2002	Yeh Dil Aashiqanaa	Karan
2003	Sssshhh...	Suraj Rai
2003	LOC Kargil	Major Rajesh Singh Adhikari
2004	Tum?: A Dangerous Obsession	Jatin
2008	Tera Kya Hoga Johnny	Vishal
2020	Guns of Banaras	Guddu

=== Television ===
Year	Title	Role	Notes
2021	Bigg Boss OTT	Contestant	Evicted on Day 13
