= Adrustam =

2002 Telugu film by Sekhar Suri

- Directed by: Sekhar Suri
- Written by: Sekhar Suri
- Produced by: Mansoor Ahmed; Paras Jain; Vakada Anjan Kumar; R. B. Choudary (Presenter)
- Starring: Tarun; Reema Sen; Gajala
- Cinematography: Shyam K. Naidu
- Edited by: Thirupathi Reddy
- Music by: Dhina
- Production company: Super Good Productions
- Release date: 6 June 2002
- Country: India
- Language: Telugu

Adrustam (transl. Luck) is a 2002 Indian Telugu-language film written and directed by debutant Sekhar Suri. The film stars Tarun, Gajala, and Reema Sen with supporting roles played by Shiju, Sivaji, Prakash Raj, Asha Saini, and Jeeva. Adrustam was released to negative reviews and was a box office disaster. It was later dubbed into Tamil as Ivan Yaaro.

== Plot ==
Tarun is an orphan and a postgraduate, but he is unemployed. He faces constant pressure from his landlord, Valmiki, who demands overdue rent payments. In an attempt to make a living, Tarun takes a job as a bar manager, where he insults Magadha, a local goon, prompting Magadha to seek revenge.

While grappling with these troubles, Tarun comes across an advertisement for a "Swayamvaram" event organized by the wealthy Dhanaraj family, where their daughter Keerthi Dhanaraj is to choose a suitor. Attending the event, which is broadcast live, Tarun becomes infatuated with Keerthi and impulsively kisses her on live television, shocking the viewers and infuriating Keerthi. This action leads to the wrath of Keerthi's cross-cousin, Pawan, who is deeply in love with her but despised by Keerthi. In retaliation for Tarun's bold act, Pawan embarks on a mission to find him. Mrs. Dhanaraj, Keerthi’s mother, announces a cash reward for anyone who captures Tarun.

Meanwhile, Asha is in a troubled relationship with Robin. On the day of their wedding, she has a change of heart and flees, becoming a runaway bride. During her escape, she crosses paths with Tarun, who is also on the run. As both are pursued by various individuals—including Pawan, Magadha, Valmiki, and the police—Tarun and Asha develop feelings for each other. The rest of the film unfolds as Tarun must decide whether to marry Asha or return to Keerthi.

== Cast ==
- Tarun as Tarun
- Gajala as Keerthi Dhanaraj
- Reema Sen as Asha (voice dubbed by Savitha Reddy)
- Shiju as Robin
- Sivaji as Pawan
- Prakash Raj as Police Officer
- Asha Saini as Smita / Pinky
- Brahmanandam as Valmiki
- Venu Madhav as Tarun's friend
- Jeeva as Magadha
- M. S. Narayana as Smita's husband
- Raghu Kunche as a groom in Keerthi's Swayamvaram
- Narsing Yadav as Valmiki's henchman
- Jayachitra as Mrs. Dhanaraj, Keerthi's mother
- Raghunatha Reddy as Dhanaraj, Keerthi's father
- Subbaraya Sharma as Astrologer

== Production ==
Adrustam marked the directorial debut of Sekhar Suri, a Telugu native who had previously worked as a ghostwriter in Mumbai. The film was inspired by the classic Roman Holiday (1953), with Suri aiming to create a story in which an ordinary man falls in love with a princess. The narrative was further influenced by a real-life incident in 1980 when actress Padmini Kolhapure kissed Prince Charles during his visit to India, which sparked widespread media attention. Suri reimagined this event by crafting a storyline in which a common man kisses a princess, forming the basis of Adrustam.

The film was produced by Super Good Productions, with Tarun playing a significant role in securing the production deal. Although Suri intended to keep the focus of the film on the narrative, avoiding the inclusion of songs, industry pressures led to the addition of several musical numbers, which deviated from his original vision. Reflecting on the experience, Suri later remarked, “My failure was due to the fact that I couldn’t do the film in my way. I was never wrong in the selection of the subject. I did not want songs in that film, but I had to succumb to a lot of pressures.”

== Music ==
Adrustam

Soundtrack album by Dhina
- Released: 2002
- Recorded: 2002
- Genre: Soundtrack
- Length: 29:21
- Label: Aditya Music
- Producer: Dhina

Dhina chronology
King (2002)	Adrustam (2002)	Dhanush (2003)

The music for Adrustam was composed by Dhina and was released by Aditya Music. The song "Vayasa Vayasa" is based on Dhina's own tune "Uyire," which he originally composed for the Tamil telefilm Siragugal (1999).

Track list
No.	Title	Lyrics	Singer(s)	Length
1.	"Sairo Sairo"	Viswa	Kiran, Devan	5:09
2.	"Manassa"	Sahithi	Swarnalatha	5:05
3.	"Hollywood Handsome"	Chirravuri Vijay Kumar	Vasundhara Das, Karthik	4:46
4.	"Run Run"	Viswa	Shankar Mahadevan	3:18
5.	"Moraakko"	Chirravuri Vijay Kumar	Sukhwinder Singh, Harini	5:21
6.	"Vayasa Vayasa"	Kulasekhar	Sujatha Mohan, P. Unnikrishnan	5:42
Total length:				29:21

== Reception ==
Jeevi of Idlebrain.com rated the film 1.5 out of 5 and wrote, "Making this film is a colossal misuse of producer's funds and watching this film is sheer waste of money. Watch this film at your own risk". A critic from Sify wrote, "Adrustam is another heartless love story from the teenage love story factory that cannot be sold even as seconds in a discount sale!" A critic for The Hindu wrote, "It is an intelligent, subtle and funny film about a young man's life, shadowed by a decision he hardly knows he has made". Andhra Today wrote, "This movie may simply be an addition to Tarun's list of flops (Uncle, Chirujallu). It can truly test the patience of the audience and throw a damper on their appreciation. The idea of 'Swayamvaram' in this times appears very old fashioned and speaks poorly of the taste of director and the story writer. The mega bucks spent on the movie appears to serve no purpose".
