= Tej Sapru =

Indian film and television actor (born 1955)

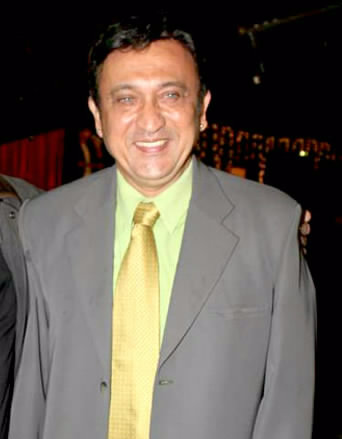
- Tej Sapru in 2011
- Born: 5 April 1955 (age 71); Bombay, Bombay State, India
- Occupation: Actor
- Years active: 1979–present
- Spouse: Dhanlaxmi Sapru
- Father: D. K. Sapru
- Relatives: Priti Sapru (sister); Reema Rakesh Nath (sister); Rekha (sister-in-law)

Tej Sapru (born 5 April 1955) is an Indian actor who mainly works in Hindi films. Born to actors D. K. Sapru and Hemvati Sapru, he has appeared in a number of Bollywood films between the 1980s and 2010s, including Tridev, Vishwatma, Tezaab, Gupt, Mohra, Sirf Tum, Saajan and Aarzoo. He is also known for his roles in popular television series such as Qubool Hai, Saat Phere – Saloni Ka Safar, Yahan Main Ghar Ghar Kheli and Zee Horror Show.

== Personal life ==
Tej's sisters, the actress Priti Sapru and the screenwriter Reema Rakesh Nath, are well-known names in Punjabi and Hindi cinema. His wife Dhanlaxmi is a maternal half-sister of actress Rekha.

== Filmography ==
=== Hindi films ===
Year	Film	Role	Notes
1965	Shaheed		
1979	Surakksha	Jackson 'Jackie'	
1980	Cobra	Kamaljeet	
1981	Pyar To Hona Hi Tha		
1981	Ehsaan Aap Ka		
1981	Laparwah	Veeru	
1981	Kalkut		
1982	Rajput	Jaipal Singh's Nephew	
1982	Sumbandh	Shakti Singh	
1982	Jeeo Aur Jeene Do	Madhav 'Micky' Singh	
1983	Dard-E-Dil	Banke	
1983	Hum Se Hai Zamana	Gambler	
1983	Faraib	College Student	
1983	Bekaraar	Joginder	
1984	Laal Chooda	Jagirdar Jarnail P. Singh	
1985	Patthar Dil	Mahendra Singh	
1985	Aandhi-Toofan	Balbir's man	
1985	Karm Yudh	Rakesh Saxena	
1985	Yudh	Goga (Danny's man)	
1985	Insaaf Main Karoonga	Captain Yunus	
1986	Insaaf Ki Awaaz		
1986	Anjaam	Amar	
1986	Main Balwaan	CBi Inspector Ranjit Kapoor	
1987	Aag Hi Aag	Jeeva	
1987	Sitapur Ki Geeta	Teju	
1988	Tezaab		
1988	Kanwarlal	Jhaanga	
1988	Paap Ko Jalaa Kar Raakh Kar Doonga	Tejinder	
1988	Aakhri Muqabla		
1989	Main Tera Dushman	Kaalu	
1989	Sachai Ki Taqat	Tony Fernandes	
1989	Kahan Hai Kanoon	Bakya	
1989	Purani Haveli	Vikram	
1989	Mujrim	Lucky	
1989	Jung Baaz	Tej	
1989	Tridev	Goga	
1989	Paanch Paapi	Dheeraj Singh	
1989	Kanoon Apna Apna	Prakash K. Kanhaiyalal	
1989	Kasam Vardi Ki	Inspector Rakesh Mehra	
1990	Naag Nagin	Vikram	
1990	Majboor	Tejaa	
1990	Izzatdaar	Kubba	
1990	Kali Ganga	Jagga	
1990	Aaj Ke Shahenshah	Police Inspector	
1990	Zimmedaaar	Jagpal	
1990	Thanedaar	Peter	
1990	Muqaddar Ka Badshaah	Manik Singh	
1991	Ajooba	Prince Udham Singh	
1991	Karz Chukana Hai	Kailash	
1991	Pratikar	Raghu Srivastav	
1991	Kaun Kare Kurbanie	Tej Singh	
1991	Saajan	Veera	
1992	Saatwan Aasman	Mahesh	
1992	Inteha Pyar Ki	Raja	
1992	Insaan Bana Shaitaan	Mahesh	
1992	Vishwatma	Bada Nilu	
1992	Raat	Inspector	
1992	Adharm	Pratap Verma	
1992	Isi Ka Naam Zindagi	Vijay	
1992	Jeena Marna Tere Sang	Gulati	
1993	Muqabla	Police Inspector Waghmare	
1993	Sangram	Jagdish Singh Rana	
1993	Kundan	Tej Singh	
1993	Police Wala		
1993	Jeevan Ki Shatranj	Babu	
1993	Gurudev	Moti Pandey	
1993	Gardish	Billa's Henchman	
1993	Chandra Mukhi	Ghunga	
1994	Fauj	Nagraj	
1994	Dulaara	Professor Akash Verma	
1994	Andaz	Bhola	
1994	Saajan Ka Ghar	Teja	
1994	Ekka Raja Rani	Aslam Billa	
1994	Mohra	Irfan	
1995	Haathkadi	Police Inspector Prabhakar	
1995	Kismat	Dara	
1995	Anokha Andaaz	Ramesh	
1995	Ravan Raaj: A True Story	Madanlal	
1995	Jallad	Police Inspector	
1996	Apne Dam Par	Pandeyji	
1996	Maahir		
1996	Chhote Sarkar		
1997	Gupt: The Hidden Truth	Jailor	
1997	Lahoo Ke Do Rang	Chinnu Shikari	
1997	Kaalia	Inspector Vikram	
1997	Tarazu	Inspector Kulkarni	
1997	Daadagiri	Rangeela Ratan	
1997	Hameshaa	Banwari	
1997	Mohabbat	Dr R.C. Goyal	
1998	Doli Saja Ke Rakhna	Inspector Prithvi Sinha	
1998	Do Numbri		
1998	Sher-E-Hindustan	2nd son of Choudhary	
1998	Badmaash	Dilip	
1998	Mafia Raaj	Police Inspector Ghag	
1999	Sirf Tum	Nirmal	
2000	Rahasya		
2000	Sultaan	Police Inspector V V Rokade	
2000	Baaghi	Randir Kanojia	
2000	Billa No. 786	Kaalu Ragda	
2000	Gaja Gamini	Tansen	
2001	Officer	Police Officer Pradhan	
2001	Khatron Ke Khiladi	Vishnu Pratap Singh	
2002	Inth Ka Jawab Patthar	Inspector Pratap	
2002	Kranti	John	
2002	Waah! Tera Kya Kehna	Defence lawyer	
2002	Onnaman	Gulab Chand Shah	
2003	Raja Bhaiya	Forest Officer	
2004	Suno Sasurjee	Shera's younger brother	
2004	Asambhav	General	
2005	Dhadkanein		
2006	Alag	Dr. Manke	
2008	Pehli Nazar Ka Pyaar		
2009	Team: The Force		
2011	Jihne Mera Dil Luteya	Pritpal Singh	
2012	Ghost	Mr. Singh	
2013	Rangeelay		
2020	Guns of Banaras	Hema's father	
2023	Kisi Ka Bhai Kisi Ki Jaan	Inspector	

=== Other language films ===
Year	Film	Role	Language
1994	Kashmeeram	Abbas Qureshi	Malayalam
1995	Savyasachi		Kannada
1995	Aksharam	Ramji	Malayalam
1995	Kattumarakaran	Raja Rajamanikkam	Tamil
1996	Rajaputhran	Masood Ali Malabari	Malayalam
1996	Rangoli		Kannada
2002	Onnaman	Gulab Chand Shah	Malayalam
2012	Rebel	Nanu	Telugu
2018	NOTA	Swamiji	Tamil
2024	Razakar – Silent Genocide of Hyderabad	Sardar Vallabhbhai Patel	Telugu
2025	They Call Him OG	Vardhaman Mirajkar	Telugu

== Television career ==
Sapru has acted in several daily soaps like Qubool Hai, Saat Phere – Saloni Ka Safar, Tumhari Pakhi, Yahan Main Ghar Ghar Kheli and Palampur Express. He is known for his portrayal of Amatya Rakshas in the Dangal TV/Imagine TV historical series Chandragupta Maurya, which depicts the life of Indian emperor Chandragupta Maurya. He also played the role of Greek king Seleucus I Nicator in the Colors TV serial Chakravartin Ashoka Samrat. and the role of Chanakya in ABP News TV series Bharatvarsh in 2016. He also portrayed as Md. Ali jinnah in the television series - Pradhanmantri.

=== TV serials ===
Year	Serial	Role	Channel	Notes
1997	Aahat	Inspector	Sony Entertainment Television	
2004	Hatim	Pasha	Star Plus	
2007	Chandramukhi		DD National	
2007–2008	Saat Phere – Saloni Ka Safar	Gajpratap Singh	Zee TV	
2007–2012	Kesariya Balam Aavo Hamare Des	Bhanvar Singh	Sahara One	
2009	Palampur Express	MLA	Sony Entertainment Television	
2011–2012	Chandragupta Maurya	Amatya Rakshas	Imagine TV	
2012–2014	Qubool Hai	Gafoor Ahmed Siddiqui	Zee TV	
2013–2014	Pradhanmantri	Muhammad Ali Jinnah	ABP News	
2013–2014	Tumhari Paakhi	Rakshit Rana	Life OK	
2015–2016	Chakravartin Ashoka Samrat	Seleucus I Nicator	Colors TV	
2016	Bharatvarsh	Chanakya	ABP News	
2017–2018	Dil Se Dil Tak	Purushotham Bhanushali	Colors TV	
2022	Baal Shiv – Mahadev Ki Andekhi Gatha	Maharaj Daksha	And TV	
2022	Harphoul Mohini	Balwant Singh Choudhary	Colors TV	

=== Web series ===
Year	Title	Role	Channel	Notes
2022	Undekhi	Arjan Singh	SonyLIV	Season 2

== See also ==
- List of Indian film actors
- Bollywood
