= Saajan =

1991 Indian film by Lawrence D'Souza

- Theatrical release poster
- Directed by: Lawrence D'Souza
- Written by: Reema Rakesh Nath
- Based on: Cyrano de Bergerac (1897) by Edmond Rostand
- Produced by: Sudhakar Bokade
- Starring: Sanjay Dutt; Madhuri Dixit; Salman Khan
- Cinematography: Lawrence D'Souza
- Edited by: A. R. Rajendran
- Music by: Nadeem-Shravan; Sameer (lyrics)
- Distributed by: Eros Entertainment; Goldmines Telefilms; Divya Films International
- Release date: 30 August 1991
- Running time: 193 minutes
- Country: India
- Language: Hindi
- Box office: ₹18.35 crore (US$8.09 million)

Saajan (lit. 'Beloved') is a 1991 Indian Hindi-language romantic drama film directed by Lawrence D'Souza and produced by Sudhakar Bokade. The film is a remake of Bengali film Apan Amar Apan. Loosely based on the classic French play Cyrano de Bergerac (1897), it stars Sanjay Dutt, Madhuri Dixit, and Salman Khan in lead roles, with Kader Khan, Reema Lagoo and Laxmikant Berde in supporting roles. Nadeem–Shravan composed the film's music whereas Sameer wrote the lyrics of the songs.

Saajan was released on 30 August 1991, and grossed ₹18.35 crore worldwide, thus becoming the highest-grossing Indian film of 1991.

At the 37th Filmfare Awards, Saajan received a leading 11 nominations, including Best Film, Best Director (D'Souza), Best Actor (Dutt) and Best Actress (Dixit), and won 2 awards – Best Music Director (Nadeem–Shravan) and Best Male Playback Singer (Kumar Sanu for "Mera Dil Bhi Kitna Pagal Hai").

== Plot ==
Rajiv Verma, a wealthy businessman, lives with his wife, Kamla, and their young son, Aakash. While visiting an orphanage, Aakash meets Aman, a boy with a physical disability, and the two quickly forge a deep friendship. Touched by their bond, Rajiv decides to legally adopt Aman. Both Kamla and Aakash wholeheartedly embrace Aman into the household as their elder son and brother, raising the two boys with equal affection.

Twelve years later, Aakash and Aman have grown into adulthood, maintaining an inseparable relationship despite their contrasting personalities. Aakash is charismatic, carefree, and socially outgoing, often dedicating his time to community service and social work. In contrast, Aman is introspective and quiet, channeling his emotions into poetry and shayari. Under the pen name "Sagar," Aman's work achieves massive critical and commercial success, garnering him a passionate following. Unknown to anyone outside his immediate circle, Aman keeps his literary identity strictly confidential. Among his most ardent admirers is Pooja Saxena, a spirited bookstore owner who regularly sends heartfelt letters to Sagar, developing an emotional connection with the unseen poet.

Aman travels to the hill station of Ooty to oversee a corporate project, where he crosses paths with Pooja. Recognizing her from her letters, Aman befriends her, though Pooja remains unaware that he is her beloved poet Sagar. As they spend time together, Aman begins falling in love with her and resolves to reveal his true identity. However, when local goons accost Pooja, Aman intervenes to defend her but is overpowered due to his physical disability. A police officer arrives in time to defuse the altercation, but bluntly remarks that Aman’s physical limitations made him incapable of protecting her. Devastated and plagued by an acute sense of inadequacy, Aman concludes that he is unworthy of Pooja and chooses to keep his identity as Sagar a secret.

Shortly afterward, Aakash arrives in Ooty to visit Aman and unexpectedly meets Pooja, falling in love with her at first sight. Aakash confides his feelings to Aman, unaware of Aman's secret identity as Sagar or his affection for Pooja. Prioritizing his brother's happiness over his own, Aman convinces Aakash to pose as the poet Sagar to win Pooja’s heart. When Aman introduces Aakash to Pooja as the celebrated writer, she is overjoyed to finally meet the man behind the poetry, and the two begin courting.

Over time, Aakash grows exhausted and guilt-ridden living a lie, finding it increasingly difficult to pretend to be an intellectual poet. His suspicion leads him to uncover Aman's manuscripts, discovering that Aman is the actual Sagar and that he harbors deep feelings for Pooja. Realizing the magnitude of Aman's sacrifice, a furious and emotional Aakash confronts his brother for prioritizing fraternal affection over his own heart.

Determined to right the wrong, Aakash brings Pooja to Aman and reveals the entire deception. Pooja is initially heartbroken and expresses hurt that Aman hid the truth, remarking that she would have loved him for who he was had he been honest from the start. Aakash gracefully steps aside, relinquishing his claim for the sake of the two people he loves most. Recognizing the depth of Aman’s devotion and acknowledging her genuine love for the soul behind the poetry, Pooja embraces Aman, uniting the lovers as Aakash watches on with quiet contentment.

== Cast ==
- Sanjay Dutt as Aman/Sagar
- Madhuri Dixit as Pooja Saxena
- Salman Khan as Aakash Verma
- Kader Khan as Rajiv Verma
- Reema Lagoo as Kamla Verma
- Ekta Sohini as Menaka
- Laxmikant Berde as Laxminandan
- Anjana Mumtaz as Manyata Saxena
- Dinesh Hingoo as Lalchand
- Yunus Parvez as Anees
- Raju Shrestha as Yashvant Saxena
- Tej Sapru as Veera
- Vikas Anand as Inspector Dilip
- Raja Duggal
- Pankaj Udhas (Cameo in the song Jiyen to Jiyen Kaise)
- Lawrence D'Souza (Cameo in the song Dekha Hai Pehli Baar)

== Production ==
Aamir Khan was offered Aman's role but refused as he did not connect with the role. Sanjay Dutt was finalised after this.

== Reception ==
The film was a blockbuster and The film was the highest-grossing Bollywood film of 1991.

== Soundtrack ==
The music was composed by Nadeem-Shravan, with lyrics by Sameer and Faiz Anwar (for "Pehli Bar Mile Hain"). The album was the year's top seller, with around 7 million copies sold. Vocals are supplied by S. P. Balasubrahmanyam Salman Khan, Kumar Sanu for Sanjay Dutt, and Anuradha Paudwal and Alka Yagnik both for Madhuri Dixit. Pankaj Udhas sang another version of Jeeye Toh Jeeye.

The soundtrack of the film fetched Nadeem-Shravan their second consecutive Filmfare Award for Best Music Director. Sanu won his second Filmfare Award for Best Male Playback Singer for the song "Mera Dil Bhi Kitna Pagal Hai". All the singers were nominated for Filmfare Awards. The Composition of this song "Bahut Pyar Karte Hai" was copied from the song "Bahut khubsurat Hai" from Abshar (1978), which was sung by Mehdi Hassan. The soundtrack was #16 on the list of "100 Greatest Bollywood Soundtracks of All Time", as compiled by Planet Bollywood.

Saajan

Soundtrack album by Nadeem Shravan
- Released: 1991
- Genre: Feature film soundtrack
- Length: 47:00
- Label: Venus Records & Tapes
- Producer: Nadeem Shravan

Nadeem Shravan chronology
Dil Hai Ki Manta Nahin (1991)	Saajan (1991)	Saathi (1991)

Professional ratings
Review scores
Source	Rating
Planet Bollywood	8/10 stars

Track listing
No.	Title	Singer(s)	Length
1.	"Mera Dil Bhi Kitna Pagal Hai"	Kumar Sanu & Alka Yagnik	05:25
2.	"Bahut Pyar Karte Hai (Male)"	S. P. Balasubrahmanyam	03:05
3.	"Dekha Hai Pehli Baar (Darbari)"	S. P. Balasubrahmanyam & Alka Yagnik	06:13
4.	"Jeeye To Jeeye Kaise"	Kumar Sanu, S. P. Balasubrahmanyam & Anuradha Paudwal	06:38
5.	"Bahut Pyar Karte Hain (Female)"	Anuradha Paudwal	04:25
6.	"Tumse Milne Ki Tamanna Hai"	S. P. Balasubrahmanyam	05:30
7.	"Tu Shayar Hai Main Teri Shayari"	Alka Yagnik	06:30
8.	"Jeeye To Jeeye Kaise (Solo)"	Pankaj Udhas	03:30
9.	"Pehli Baar Mile Hain"	S. P. Balasubrahmanyam	06:16
Total length:			47:00

== Awards ==
Award	Category	Recipients and nominees	Results
37th Filmfare Awards	Best Music Director	Nadeem-Shravan	Won
37th Filmfare Awards	Best Male Playback Singer	Kumar Sanu for "Mera Dil Bhi Kitna Paagal Hai"	Won
37th Filmfare Awards	Best Film	Sudhakar Bokade	Nominated
37th Filmfare Awards	Best Director	Lawrence D'Souza	Nominated
37th Filmfare Awards	Best Actor	Sanjay Dutt	Nominated
37th Filmfare Awards	Best Actress	Madhuri Dixit	Nominated
37th Filmfare Awards	Best Lyricist	Sameer for "Mera Dil Bhi Kitna Paagal Hai"	Nominated
37th Filmfare Awards	Best Male Playback Singer	Pankaj Udhas for "Jiye To Jiye Kaise"	Nominated
37th Filmfare Awards	Best Male Playback Singer	S. P. Balasubrahmanyam for "Tumse Milne Ki Tamanna Hai"	Nominated
37th Filmfare Awards	Best Female Playback Singer	Alka Yagnik for "Dekha Hai Pehli Baar"	Nominated
37th Filmfare Awards	Best Female Playback Singer	Anuradha Paudwal for "Bahut Pyar Karte Hai"	Nominated
