= Lawrence D'Souza =

Indian film director and cinematographer

- Occupations: Director, Cinematographer
- Years active: 1984–2009
- Children: Andria D'Souza

Lawrence D'Souza is an Indian film director and cinematographer known for his Hindi films of the 1990s.

== Filmography ==
=== As cinematographer and director ===
Year	Film	Credited as		Note	Ref
Year	Film	Cinematographer	Director	Note	Ref
1984	Aaradhane	✓	✗	Kannada language	
1985	Yaar Kasam	✓	✗		
1987	Sabu Mayare Baya	✓	✗	Assistant cameraman	
1987	Madadgaar	✓	✗	Assistant cameraman	
1988	Hatya	✓	✗		
1989	Gair Kaanooni	✓	✗		
1990	Nyay Anyay	✗	✓		
1991	Saajan	✓	✓		
1992	Maarg	✓	✗		
1992	Jai Kaali	✓	✗		
1992	Dil Ka Kya Kasoor	✓	✓		
1992	Sapne Sajan Ke	✓	✓		
1993	Balmaa	✓	✓		
1993	Dil Tera Aashiq	✓	✓		
1993	Sangram	✓	✓		
1993	Prateeksha	✓	✓		
Unreleased	Jai Devaa	✓	✓		
1995	Anokha Andaaz	✓	✓		
1995	Fauji	✓	✓		
1996	Maahir	✓	✓		
1996	Papi Gudia	✓	✓		
1996	Dil Tera Deewana	✓	✓		
1999	Aarzoo	✓	✓		
2003	Indian Babu	✓	✓		
2009	Sanam Teri Kasam	✓	✓		
